= 1938 Detroit Lions season =

NFL team season

- Head coach: Dutch Clark
- Home stadium: Titans Stadium and Briggs Stadium

Results
- Record: 7–4
- Division place: 2nd NFL Western
- Playoffs: Did not qualify

The 1938 Detroit Lions season marked their ninth year in the National Football League (NFL). The team matched their previous season's output of 7–4. They failed to qualify for the playoffs for the third consecutive season.

== Offseason ==
=== Draft ===
1938 Detroit Lions draft
Round	Pick	Player	Position	College	Notes
1	6	Alex Wojciechowicz ^{†}	C	Fordham	
3	21	Pete Smith	E	Oklahoma	
5	36	Andy Bershak	E	North Carolina	
6	46	Karl Schleckman	T	Utah	
7	56	Paul Szakash	E	Montana	
8	66	Dick Nardi	B	Ohio State	
9	76	Jim Sirtosky	G	Indiana	
10	86	Ralph Wolf	C	Ohio State	
11	96	Clarence Douglass	B	Kansas	
12	106	Clint Frank	B	Yale	1937 Heisman Trophy winner
Made roster † Pro Football Hall of Fame

== Schedule ==
Game	Date	Opponent	Result	Record	Venue	Attendance	Recap	Sources
1	September 9	Pittsburgh Pirates	**W** 16–7	1–0	University of Detroit Stadium	18,000	Recap	
—	22 day bye							
2	October 2	at **Cleveland Rams**	**L** 17–21	1–1	Shaw Stadium	8,012	Recap	
3	October 9	at **Green Bay Packers**	**W** 17–7	2–1	City Stadium	21,968	Recap	
4	October 16	Washington Redskins	**L** 5–7	2–2	Briggs Stadium	42,855	Recap	
5	October 23	**Chicago Cardinals**	**W** 10–0	3–2	Briggs Stadium	17,917	Recap	
6	October 30	at **Chicago Bears**	**W** 13–7	4–2	Wrigley Field	24,346	Recap	
7	November 6	**Cleveland Rams**	**W** 6–0	5–2	Briggs Stadium	31,140	Recap	
8	November 13	**Green Bay Packers**	**L** 7–28	5–3	Briggs Stadium	45,139	Recap	
9	November 20	at **Chicago Cardinals**	**W** 7–3	6–3	Comiskey Park	8,279	Recap	
10	November 24	**Chicago Bears**	**W** 14–7	7–3	Briggs Stadium	26,278	Recap	
11	December 4	Philadelphia Eagles	**L** 7–21	7–4	Briggs Stadium	18,985	Recap	
Notes: Intra-conference opponents are in **bold** text. Thursday, November 24 was Thanksgiving.

== Roster ==
1938 Detroit Lions final roster
Backs: 1 Ernie Caddel RB/CB; 3 Lloyd Cardwell RB/CB; 7 Dutch Clark RB/S/K; 5 Ace Gutowsky FB/LB; 6 Vern Huffman RB/S; 20 Jim McDonald RB/CB; 4 Dick Nardi RB/CB; 2 Kent Ryan RB/CB/S; 9 Bill Shepherd RB/S/K; 8 Paul Szakash FB/LB; 22 Fred Vanzo RB/CB	Linemen/Linebackers: 14 George Christensen T/DT; 26 Bill Feldhaus G/DG; 23 Les Graham G/DG; 16 Jack Johnson T/DT; 27 Tony Matisi T/DT; 19 Regis Monahan G/DG/K; 28 Bill Radovich G/DG; 24 Bob Reynolds T/DT; 18 Bill Rogers T/DT; 17 Dixie Stokes C/LB; 15 Sid Wagner G/DG; 30 Alex Wojciechowicz C/LB	Ends/Receivers: 12 Chuck Hanneman; 10 Ed Klewicki; 13 Butch Morse; 11 Monk Moscrip K; 21 Maury Patt; rookies in italics

== Standings ==
NFL Western Division
	W	L	T	PCT	DIV	PF	PA	STK
Green Bay Packers	8	3	0	.727	6–2	223	118	L1
Detroit Lions	7	4	0	.636	6–2	119	108	L1
Chicago Bears	6	5	0	.545	3–5	194	148	L1
Cleveland Rams	4	7	0	.364	3–5	131	215	W1
Chicago Cardinals	2	9	0	.182	2–6	111	168	W1

Note: Tie games were not officially counted in the standings until 1972.

NFL Eastern Division
	W	L	T	PCT	DIV	PF	PA	STK
New York Giants	8	2	1	.800	5–2–1	194	79	W1
Washington Redskins	6	3	2	.667	4–2–2	148	154	L1
Brooklyn Dodgers	4	4	3	.500	3–2–3	131	161	T1
Philadelphia Eagles	5	6	0	.455	3–5	154	164	W2
Pittsburgh Pirates	2	9	0	.182	2–6	79	169	L6

Note: Tie games were not officially counted in the standings until 1972.
