= 1938 NFL draft =

National Football League Draft held in 1937

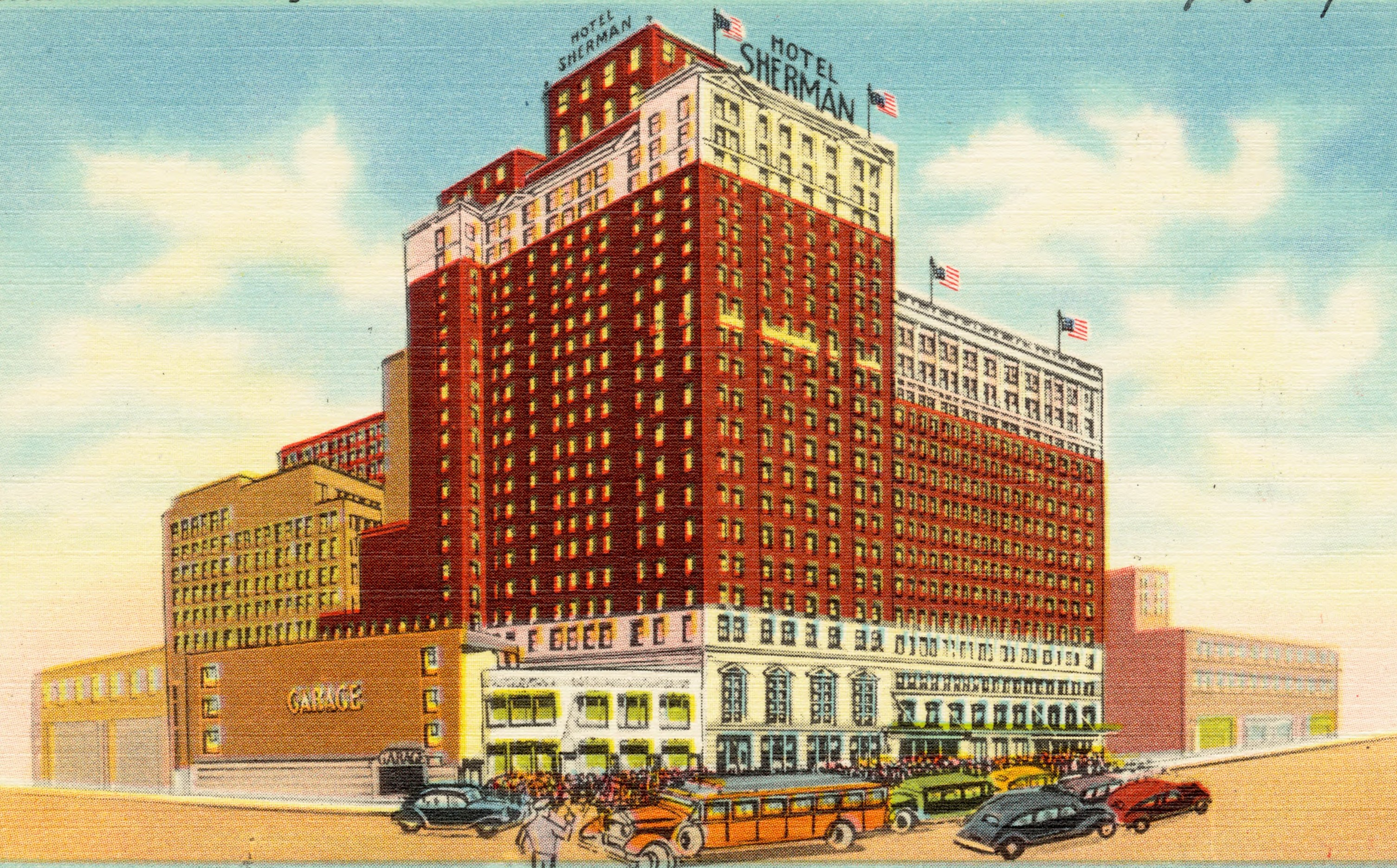
- Illustration of the Sherman House Hotel (location of the draft)

General information
- Date: December 12, 1937
- Location: Sherman House Hotel, in Chicago, IL

Overview
- 110 total selections in 12 rounds
- League: NFL
- First selection: Corbett Davis, FB; Cleveland Rams
- Most selections (12): Brooklyn Dodgers, Chicago Cardinals, Cleveland Rams, Philadelphia Eagles, Pittsburgh Pirates
- Fewest selections (10): Chicago Bears; Detroit Lions; Green Bay Packers; New York Giants; Washington Redskins
- Hall of Famers: 2: C Alex Wojciechowicz; OT Frank Kinard

The 1938 NFL draft was held on December 12, 1937, at the Sherman House Hotel in Chicago, Illinois. The draft consisted of 12 rounds and 110 player selections. It began with the Cleveland Rams using the first overall pick of the draft to select Corbett Davis.

== Player selections ==
| ‡ | = Hall of Famer (Note: Players are identified as a Hall of Famer if they have been inducted into the Pro Football Hall of Fame.) |
| † | = Pro Bowler (Note: Players are identified as a Pro Bowler if they were selected for the Pro Bowl at any time in their career.) |

| Rnd. | Pick | Team | Player | Pos. | College | Notes |
|---|---|---|---|---|---|---|
| 1 | 1 | Cleveland Rams | Corbett Davis | RB | Indiana | |
| 1 | 2 | Philadelphia Eagles | James Allen McDonald | B | Ohio State | |
| 1 | 3 | Brooklyn Dodgers | Boyd Brumbaugh | B | Duquesne | |
| 1 | 4 | Pittsburgh Pirates | Byron White | B | Colorado | Future supreme court justice |
| 1 | 5 | Chicago Cardinals | Jack Robbins | B | Arkansas | |
| 1 | 6 | Detroit Lions | Alex Wojciechowicz^{‡} | C | Fordham | |
| 1 | 7 | Green Bay Packers | Cecil Isbell ^{†} | B | Purdue | |
| 1 | 8 | New York Giants | George Karamatic | B | Gonzaga | |
| 1 | 9 | Washington Redskins | Andy Farkas ^{†} | B | Detroit | |
| 1 | 10 | Chicago Bears | Joe Gray | B | Oregon State | |
| 2 | 11 | Cleveland Rams | Jim Benton ^{†} | E | Arkansas | |
| 2 | 12 | Philadelphia Eagles | Dick Riffle ^{†} | B | Albright | |
| 2 | 13 | Brooklyn Dodgers | Joe Kilgrow | B | Alabama | |
| 2 | 14 | Pittsburgh Pirates | Frank Filchock ^{†} | B | Indiana | |
| 2 | 15 | Chicago Cardinals | Milt Popovich | B | Montana | |
| 3 | 16 | Cleveland Rams | Joe Routt | G | Texas A&M | |
| 3 | 17 | Philadelphia Eagles | Joe Bukant | B | Washington University | |
| 3 | 18 | Brooklyn Dodgers | Frank Kinard^{‡} | T | Ole Miss | |
| 3 | 19 | Pittsburgh Pirates | Hugh Wolfe ^{†} | B | Texas | |
| 3 | 20 | Chicago Cardinals | Frank Patrick | B | Pittsburgh | |
| 3 | 21 | Detroit Lions | Pete Smith | E | Oklahoma | |
| 3 | 22 | Green Bay Packers | Marty Schreyer | T | Purdue | |
| 3 | 23 | New York Giants | Fred Vanzo ^{†} | B | Northwestern | |
| 3 | 24 | Washington Redskins | Sam Chapman | B | California | |
| 3 | 25 | Chicago Bears | Gary Famiglietti ^{†} | B | Boston University | |
| 4 | 26 | Cleveland Rams | Vic Markov | T | Washington | |
| 4 | 27 | Philadelphia Eagles | John Meek | B | California | |
| 4 | 28 | Brooklyn Dodgers | Gene Moore | C | Colorado | |
| 4 | 29 | Pittsburgh Pirates | Tony Matisi | T | Pittsburgh | |
| 4 | 30 | Chicago Cardinals | Bob Herwig | C | California | |
| 5 | 31 | Cleveland Rams | Ed Franco | G | Fordham | |
| 5 | 32 | Philadelphia Eagles | Fred Shirey | T | Nebraska | |
| 5 | 33 | Brooklyn Dodgers | Ed Merlin | G | Vanderbilt | |
| 5 | 34 | Pittsburgh Pirates | Lou Midler | T | Minnesota | |
| 5 | 35 | Chicago Cardinals | Al Babartsky | T | Fordham | |
| 5 | 36 | Detroit Lions | Andy Bershak | E | North Carolina | |
| 5 | 37 | Green Bay Packers | Chuck Sweeney | E | Notre Dame | |
| 5 | 38 | New York Giants | Marion Konemann | B | Georgia Tech | |
| 5 | 39 | Washington Redskins | Dave Price | C | Mississippi State | |
| 5 | 40 | Chicago Bears | Gust Zarnas ^{†} | G | Ohio State | |
| 6 | 41 | Cleveland Rams | Ray Hamilton | G | Arkansas | |
| 6 | 42 | Philadelphia Eagles | Herschel Ramsey | E | Texas Tech | |
| 6 | 43 | Brooklyn Dodgers | Perry Schwartz ^{†} | E | California | |
| 6 | 44 | Pittsburgh Pirates | George Platukis | E | Duquesne | |
| 6 | 45 | Chicago Cardinals | Joe Brunansky | T | Duke | |
| 6 | 46 | Detroit Lions | Karl Schleckman | T | Utah | |
| 6 | 47 | Green Bay Packers | Andy Uram ^{†} | B | Minnesota | |
| 6 | 48 | New York Giants | Frank Souchak | E | Pittsburgh | |
| 6 | 49 | Washington Redskins | Elmer Dohrmann | E | Nebraska | |
| 6 | 50 | Chicago Bears | Bob Masterson ^{†} | E | Miami (FL) | |
| 7 | 51 | Cleveland Rams | Marcel Chesbro | G | Colgate | |
| 7 | 52 | Philadelphia Eagles | Bob Lannon | E | Iowa | |
| 7 | 53 | Brooklyn Dodgers | Leroy Monsky | G | Alabama | |
| 7 | 54 | Pittsburgh Pirates | Ray King | E | Minnesota | |
| 7 | 55 | Chicago Cardinals | Ed Cherry | B | Hardin–Simmons | |
| 7 | 56 | Detroit Lions | Paul Szakash | E | Montana | |
| 7 | 57 | Green Bay Packers | Johnny Kovatch | E | Northwestern | |
| 7 | 58 | New York Giants | Kelly Moan | HB | West Virginia | |
| 7 | 59 | Washington Redskins | Roy Young | G | Texas A&M | |
| 7 | 60 | Chicago Bears | Frank Ramsey | T | Oregon State | |
| 8 | 61 | Cleveland Rams | Walter Mayberry | B | Florida | |
| 8 | 62 | Philadelphia Eagles | Clem Woltman | G | Purdue | |
| 8 | 63 | Brooklyn Dodgers | Len Noyes | G | Montana | |
| 8 | 64 | Pittsburgh Pirates | Tom Burnette | HB | North Carolina | |
| 8 | 65 | Chicago Cardinals | Leon Lavington | E | Colorado | |
| 8 | 66 | Detroit Lions | Richard Nardi | HB | Ohio State | |
| 8 | 67 | Green Bay Packers | Phil Ragazzo | G | Western Reserve | |
| 8 | 68 | New York Giants | Ted Doyle | B | Nebraska | |
| 8 | 69 | Washington Redskins | Bill Hartman | FB | Georgia | |
| 8 | 70 | Chicago Bears | Fletcher Sims | B | Georgia Tech | |
| 9 | 71 | Cleveland Rams | Charles Ream | E | Ohio State | |
| 9 | 72 | Philadelphia Eagles | Elmer Kolberg | B | Oregon State | |
| 9 | 73 | Brooklyn Dodgers | John Stringham | B | BYU | |
| 9 | 74 | Pittsburgh Pirates | Paul McDonough | E | Utah | |
| 9 | 75 | Chicago Cardinals | Phil Dougherty ^{†} | C | Santa Clara | |
| 9 | 76 | Detroit Lions | Jim Sirtoskty | G | Indiana | |
| 9 | 77 | Green Bay Packers | John Howell | HB | Nebraska | |
| 9 | 78 | New York Giants | John Mellus ^{†} | T | Villanova | |
| 9 | 79 | Washington Redskins | Ed Parks | C | Oklahoma | |
| 9 | 80 | Chicago Bears | Alex Schwarz | T | San Francisco | |
| 10 | 81 | Cleveland Rams | Joe Maras | C | Duquesne | |
| 10 | 82 | Philadelphia Eagles | Emmett Kriel | G | Baylor | |
| 10 | 83 | Brooklyn Dodgers | Jim Sivell ^{†} | G | Auburn | |
| 10 | 84 | Pittsburgh Pirates | Pat McCarty | C | Notre Dame | |
| 10 | 85 | Chicago Cardinals | Dwight Sloan | FB | Arkansas | |
| 10 | 86 | Detroit Lions | Ralph Wolf | C | Ohio State | |
| 10 | 87 | Green Bay Packers | Frank Barnhart | G | Colorado State–Greeley | |
| 10 | 88 | New York Giants | Bob Grimstead | T | Washington State | |
| 10 | 89 | Washington Redskins | Jack Abbott | B | Elon | |
| 10 | 90 | Chicago Bears | John Weger | T | Butler | |
| 11 | 91 | Cleveland Rams | Al Hoptowit | G | Washington State | |
| 11 | 92 | Philadelphia Eagles | Carl Hinkle | C | Vanderbilt | |
| 11 | 93 | Brooklyn Dodgers | Johnny Druze | E | Fordham | |
| 11 | 94 | Pittsburgh Pirates | Bill Krause | G | Baldwin Wallace | |
| 11 | 95 | Chicago Cardinals | Bob Kenderdine | E | Indiana | |
| 11 | 96 | Detroit Lions | Clarence Douglass | B | Kansas | |
| 11 | 97 | Green Bay Packers | Pete Tinsley ^{†} | B | Georgia | |
| 11 | 98 | New York Giants | Doug Oldershaw ^{†} | E | Santa Barbara State | |
| 11 | 99 | Washington Redskins | Dick Johnston | E | Washington | |
| 11 | 100 | Chicago Bears | Ray Mickovsky | B | Case | |
| 12 | 101 | Cleveland Rams | Vic Spadaccini ^{†} | HB | Minnesota | |
| 12 | 102 | Philadelphia Eagles | John Michelosen | B | Pittsburgh | |
| 12 | 103 | Brooklyn Dodgers | Lou Mark | B | NC State | |
| 12 | 104 | Pittsburgh Pirates | Joe Kuharich ^{†} | G | Notre Dame | |
| 12 | 105 | Chicago Cardinals | Bob Mautner | C | Holy Cross | |
| 12 | 106 | Detroit Lions | Clint Frank | HB | Yale | 1937 Heisman Trophy winner |
| 12 | 107 | Green Bay Packers | Tony Falkenstein | B | Saint Mary's | |
| 12 | 108 | New York Giants | Elmore Hackney | FB | Duke | |
| 12 | 109 | Washington Redskins | Hank Bartos | G | North Carolina | |
| 12 | 110 | Chicago Bears | Fred Dreher | E | Denver | |

== Hall of Famers ==
- Alex Wojciechowicz, center from Fordham, taken 1st round 6th overall by the Detroit Lions.

Inducted: Professional Football Hall of Fame class of 1968.

- Frank “Bruiser” Kinard, offensive tackle from Ole Miss, taken 3rd round 18th overall by the Brooklyn Dodgers.

Inducted: Professional Football Hall of Fame class of 1971.

== Notable undrafted players ==
| † | = Pro Bowler |

| Original NFL team | Player | Pos. | College | Notes |
|---|---|---|---|---|
| Green Bay Packers | Carl Mulleneaux ^{†} | E | Utah State | |
| Green Bay Packers | Baby Ray ^{†} | T | Vanderbilt | |
| New York Giants | Enio Conti ^{†} | G | Fordham | |
| New York Giants | Frank Cope ^{†} | T | Santa Clara | |
| Washington Redskins | Willie Wilkin ^{†} | T | Saint Mary's (CA) | |
