= 1938 Cleveland Rams season =

NFL team season

- Head coach: Hugo Bezdek; Art Lewis
- Home stadium: Shaw Stadium

Results
- Record: 4–7
- Division place: 4th NFL Western
- Playoffs: Did not qualify

The 1938 Cleveland Rams season was the team's second year with the National Football League and the third season in Cleveland.

== Schedule ==
| Game | Date | Opponent | Result | Record | Venue | Attendance | Recap | Sources |
|---|---|---|---|---|---|---|---|---|
| 1 | September 11 | at **Green Bay Packers** | **L** 17–26 | 0–1 | City Stadium | 8,247 | Recap | |
| 2 | September 17 | **Chicago Cardinals** | **L** 6–7 | 0–2 | Shaw Stadium | 7,500 | Recap | |
| 3 | September 25 | at Washington Redskins | **L** 13–37 | 0–3 | Griffith Stadium | 25,000 | Recap | |
| 4 | October 2 | **Detroit Lions** | **W** 21–17 | 1–3 | Shaw Stadium | 8,012 | Recap | |
| 5 | October 9 | **Chicago Bears** | **W** 14–7 | 2–3 | Shaw Stadium | 8,024 | Recap | |
| — | October 16 | Open date | | | | | | |
| 6 | October 23 | at **Chicago Bears** | **W** 23–21 | 3–3 | Wrigley Field | 18,705 | Recap | |
| 7 | October 30 | **Green Bay Packers** | **L** 7–28 | 3–4 | League Park | 18,483 | Recap | |
| 8 | November 6 | at **Detroit Lions** | **L** 0–6 | 3–5 | Briggs Stadium | 30,140 | Recap | |
| 9 | November 13 | at New York Giants | **L** 0–28 | 3–6 | Polo Grounds | 25,000 | Recap | |
| — | November 20 | Open date | | | | | | |
| 10 | November 27 | at **Chicago Cardinals** | **L** 17–31 | 3–7 | Wrigley Field | 10,000 | Recap | |
| 11 | December 4 | at Pittsburgh Pirates | **W** 13–7 | 4–7 | Tulane Stadium | 7,500 | Recap | |
Note: Intra-division opponents in **bold** text.

== Roster ==
1938 Cleveland Rams final roster
| Backs: 29 Julie Alfonse RB/CB; 18 Carl Brazell RB/S; 32 Corby Davis FB/LB; 14 Johnny Drake FB/LB; 28 Ed Goddard RB/CB; 34 Carl Littlefield RB/CB; 15 Stan Pincura RB/S; 13 Bob Snyder RB/CB/K; 33 Vic Spadaccini FB/LB | Linemen/Linebackers: 21 Chuck Cherundolo C/LB; 35 Red Chesbro G/DG; 17 Gerry Conlee G/DG; 22 Tom Hupke G/DG; 23 Art Lewis G/DG; 31 Ted Livingston T/DT; 12 Vic Markov T/DT; 24 Jack May C/LB; 36 Phil Ragazzo G/DG; 39 Charles Ream T/DT; 19 Jack Robinson G/DG; 20 Dick Zoll T/DT | Ends/Receivers: 26 Jim Benton; 27 Ray Hamilton; 16 Johnny Kovatch; 30 Dale Prather; 25 Johnny Stephens; Reserve: Al Hoptowit T/DT (DNR); rookies in italics |

== Standings ==
NFL Western Division
| | W | L | T | PCT | DIV | PF | PA | STK |
|---|---|---|---|---|---|---|---|---|
| Green Bay Packers | 8 | 3 | 0 | .727 | 6–2 | 223 | 118 | L1 |
| Detroit Lions | 7 | 4 | 0 | .636 | 6–2 | 119 | 108 | L1 |
| Chicago Bears | 6 | 5 | 0 | .545 | 3–5 | 194 | 148 | L1 |
| Cleveland Rams | 4 | 7 | 0 | .364 | 3–5 | 131 | 215 | W1 |
| Chicago Cardinals | 2 | 9 | 0 | .182 | 2–6 | 111 | 168 | W1 |

Note: Tie games were not officially counted in the standings until 1972.

NFL Eastern Division
| | W | L | T | PCT | DIV | PF | PA | STK |
|---|---|---|---|---|---|---|---|---|
| New York Giants | 8 | 2 | 1 | .800 | 5–2–1 | 194 | 79 | W1 |
| Washington Redskins | 6 | 3 | 2 | .667 | 4–2–2 | 148 | 154 | L1 |
| Brooklyn Dodgers | 4 | 4 | 3 | .500 | 3–2–3 | 131 | 161 | T1 |
| Philadelphia Eagles | 5 | 6 | 0 | .455 | 3–5 | 154 | 164 | W2 |
| Pittsburgh Pirates | 2 | 9 | 0 | .182 | 2–6 | 79 | 169 | L6 |

Note: Tie games were not officially counted in the standings until 1972.
