= 1938 Green Bay Packers season =

NFL team season

- Head coach: Curly Lambeau
- Home stadium: City Stadium; Wisconsin State Fair Park

Results
- Record: 8–3
- Division place: 1st NFL Western
- Playoffs: Lost NFL Championship (at Giants) 17–23

The 1938 Green Bay Packers season was their 20th season overall and their 18th season in the National Football League. The team finished with an 8–3 record in 1938 under head coach Curly Lambeau, earning them a first-place finish in the Western Division.

In the championship game at the Polo Grounds, the Packers lost to the New York Giants 23–17, the first of only three losses the Packers have in 13 world championship games. The two teams met again in the title game the following year at Wisconsin State Fair Park, with different results.

This season marked the last Packers' win in Buffalo (where they defeated the Chicago Cardinals by two points on a late field goal on a Wednesday night). Since then, they are winless in six attempts against the Buffalo Bills in western New York, the latest on October 30, 2022.

== Schedule ==
Week	Date	Opponent	Result	Record	Venue	Attendance	Recap	Sources
1	September 11	**Cleveland Rams**	**W** 26–17	1–0	City Stadium	8,247	Recap	
2	September 18	at **Chicago Bears**	**L** 0–2	1–1	City Stadium	15,172	Recap	
3	September 25	**Chicago Cardinals**	**W** 28–7	2–1	Wisconsin State Fair Park	18,000	Recap	
4	September 28	v. **Chicago Cardinals** †	**W** 24–22	3–1	Buffalo Civic Stadium	10,687	Recap	
5	October 9	**Detroit Lions**	**L** 7–17	3–2	City Stadium	21,968	Recap	
6	October 16	Brooklyn Dodgers	**W** 35–7	4–2	Wisconsin State Fair Park	11,892	Recap	
7	October 23	Pittsburgh Pirates	**W** 20–0	5–2	City Stadium	12,142	Recap	
8	October 30	at **Cleveland Rams**	**W** 28–7	6–2	League Park	18,843	Recap	
9	November 6	at **Chicago Bears**	**W** 24–17	7–2	Wrigley Field	40,208	Recap	
10	November 13	at **Detroit Lions**	**W** 28–7	8–2	Briggs Stadium	45,139	Recap	
11	November 20	at New York Giants	**L** 3–15	8–3	Polo Grounds	48,279	Recap	
Note: Intra-division opponents in **bold.** • † - Played at Buffalo, New York, on Wednesday night.

== Post-season ==
Week	Date	Opponent	Result	Venue	Attendance	Recap	Sources
Championship	December 11	at New York Giants	L 17–23	Polo Grounds	48,120	Recap	

== Roster ==
1938 Green Bay Packers final roster
Backs: 5 Hank Bruder RB/S; 38 Arnie Herber RB/CB; 30 Clarke Hinkle FB/LB/K; 49 John Howell RB/CB; 17 Cecil Isbell RB/CB; 7 Eddie Jankowski FB/LB; 15 Swede Johnston RB/S; 24 Joe Laws RB/CB; 3 Paul Miller RB/CB/S; 50 Bob Monnett RB/CB/K; 51 Herm Schneidman RB/S; 8 Andy Uram RB/CB; 33 Dick Weisgerber FB/LB	Linemen/Linebackers: 35 Frank Butler T/DT; 34 Tiny Engebretsen G/DG/K; 43 Buckets Goldenberg G/DG; 11 Leo Katalinas T/DT; 40 Bill Lee T/DT; 29 Darrell Lester C/LB; 46 Russ Letlow G/DG; 48 Ookie Miller C/LB; 18 Lee Mulleneaux C/LB; 44 Baby Ray T/DT; 41 Champ Seibold T/DT; 21 Pete Tinsley G/DG	Ends/Receivers: 32 Wayland Becker; 22 Milt Gantenbein; 14 Don Hutson K; 19 Carl Mulleneaux; 36 Bernie Scherer; Rookies in italics

== Standings ==
NFL Western Division
	W	L	T	PCT	DIV	PF	PA	STK
Green Bay Packers	8	3	0	.727	6–2	223	118	L1
Detroit Lions	7	4	0	.636	6–2	119	108	L1
Chicago Bears	6	5	0	.545	3–5	194	148	L1
Cleveland Rams	4	7	0	.364	3–5	131	215	W1
Chicago Cardinals	2	9	0	.182	2–6	111	168	W1

Note: Tie games were not officially counted in the standings until 1972.
