= Cecil Isbell =

American football player and coach (1915–1985)

- Isbell, circa 1937

No. 17
- Position: Tailback

Personal information
- Born: July 11, 1915; Houston, Texas, U.S.
- Died: June 23, 1985 (aged 69); Hammond, Indiana, U.S.
- Listed height: 6 ft 1 in (1.85 m)
- Listed weight: 190 lb (86 kg)

Career information
- High school: Sam Houston (Houston)
- College: Purdue (1935–1937)
- NFL draft: 1938: 1st round, 7th overall pick

Career history

Playing
- Green Bay Packers (1938–1942)

Coaching
- Purdue (1943); Assistant coach; Purdue (1944–1946); Head coach; Baltimore Colts (1947–1949); Head coach; Chicago Cardinals (1950–1951); Offensive coordinator, quarterbacks & running backs coach; Chicago Cardinals (1951); Interim head coach; Dallas Texans (1952); Backfield coach; LSU (1953); Backfield coach

Awards and highlights
- NFL champion (1939); First-team All-Pro (1941); 4× Second-team All-Pro (1938–1941, 1942); 4× Pro Bowl (1938, 1939, 1941, 1942); 2× NFL passing touchdowns leader (1941, 1942); 2× NFL passing yards leader (1941, 1942); NFL 1930s All-Decade Team; Green Bay Packers Hall of Fame; Second-team All-American (1936); Third-team All-American (1937); 2× First-team All-Big Ten (1936, 1937)

Career NFL statistics
- Passing attempts: 818
- Passing completions: 411
- Completion percentage: 50.2%
- TD–INT: 61–52
- Passing yards: 5,945
- Passer rating: 72.6
- Rushing yards: 1,522
- Rushing touchdowns: 10
- Stats at Pro Football Reference

Head coaching record
- Regular season: 10–23–1 (.309)
- Postseason: 0–1 (.000)
- Career: NCAA: 14–14–1 (.500); NFL: 10–24–1 (.300)
- Coaching profile at Pro Football Reference
- College Football Hall of Fame

Cecil Frank Isbell (July 11, 1915 – June 23, 1985) was an American professional football player and coach. He played five seasons as a quarterback in the National Football League (NFL) with the Green Bay Packers, leading them to the NFL Championship in 1939. He retired after the 1942 season to become an assistant coach at his alma mater, Purdue University, and the following year became its head coach for three seasons.

Isbell was the head coach of the Baltimore Colts of the All-America Football Conference from 1947 to 1949, resigning after four winless games. He then became an assistant under former head coach Curly Lambeau, now with the Chicago Cardinals. When Lambeau resigned late in the 1951 season, Isbell was the interim head coach for the final two games, which they split. Isbell's pro head coaching record was 10–23–1.

Isbell was inducted into the College Football Hall of Fame in 1967 and the Green Bay Packers Hall of Fame in 1972.

== Early life and college playing career ==
Cecil Isbell was born in Houston, Texas, the second son of Adger and Sarah Isbell. His older brother Cody was also a football player for Purdue and his two younger brothers also played college football — William Adger "Dub" Isbell Jr. at Rice Institute and Larry Isbell at Baylor University.

Isbell attended Sam Houston High School in Houston, then went to Purdue, where played from 1935 through 1937. Playing tailback (American football) in the single wing formation, Isbell was regarded as an effective runner and a top-level passer during his collegiate career, helping Purdue to a 13–9–2 record during his three varsity years.

During his 1936 junior year, Isbell was involved in 15 of 23 touchdowns for Purdue, either as a runner or a passer. He similarly starred during his senior season, being voted as the Boilermakers' most valuable player for the 1937 season.

In the summer of 1938, he led the College All-Stars to victory over the defending NFL champion Washington Redskins at Soldier Field in Chicago, throwing a 39-yard touchdown pass as part of his team's 28–16 victory. He was afterwards awarded the series' first All-Star Trophy, awarded to the game's outstanding collegian.

== NFL playing career ==
Isbell was selected in the first round of the 1938 NFL draft by the Green Bay Packers, the seventh overall pick. When he arrived in Green Bay, the Packers already had an All-Pro tailback, Arnie Herber, who had led the Packers to the NFL championship in 1936. Coach Curly Lambeau alternated Isbell and Herber and occasionally used them in the same backfield, with Isbell at halfback. This "platooning" allowed Isbell to learn Lambeau's offense, the Notre Dame Box. Isbell was a very accurate passer and a good runner and he led the Packers in rushing and passing in his rookie year.

Single-wing tailback Isbell broke his own NFL record for single season passing yards in 1942, throwing for 2,021 yards.

The Packers came in first in the West and faced the New York Giants in the championship game at the Polo Grounds. Isbell rushed 11 times for 20 yards and was 3 of 5 passing for 91 yards, but the Giants prevailed, 23–17. In 1939, the Packers used the same attack and again Isbell led the team in rushing while catching 9 passes as well. The Packers again won the Western division and faced New York in a rematch from the year before. This time the game was played in Milwaukee and Green Bay crushed the Giants, 27–0, with Isbell throwing a 27-yard touchdown pass.

From 1940 to 1942, the Packers finished second in the West to the Chicago Bears each year. Isbell became a more accomplished passer during this time, connecting regularly with Don Hutson in record-setting frequency. In 1941, Isbell set an NFL record for yards passing with 1,479 and led the league in completion percentage (56.8%) and touchdown passes with 15 (10 to Hutson). The Packers finished the season tied with Chicago, but lost to the Bears in a divisional tiebreaker playoff, 33–14. In 1942, Isbell surpassed his own record with 2,021 yards passing and set a new record with 24 touchdown passes. Hutson also set NFL records with 74 receptions, 1,211 yards receiving and 17 touchdowns (Hutson's touchdown mark was matched by Elroy Hirsch in 1951 and stood until 1984). Still, the Packers finished second to Chicago, who were 11–0 in the regular season.

After the 1942 season, Isbell retired from playing in the NFL after just 5 years. He finished with 5,945 yards passing, 61 touchdowns, and 52 interceptions. According to Isbell, he retired because he'd been offered a coaching job and he thought it was too good an offer to pass up. He later admitted that accepting the coaching job was a mistake, saying, "If it means anything to anyone, I should've kept playing."

Former NFL & Green Bay Packers record

- Held the NFL record for most consecutive games with a touchdown pass with 23 games from 1940 to 1942. (These were the last 23 games of Isbell's career.) The record was later surpassed by Johnny Unitas in 1957 before Drew Brees eclipsed it in 2012. He held the Green Bay Packer record until it was later surpassed by Brett Favre in 2003.
- First player to pass for 2,000 yards in a season in 1942.

The Professional Football Researchers Association named Isbell to the PRFA Hall of Very Good Class of 2008. Isbell is one of ten players that were named to the National Football League 1930s All-Decade Team that have not been inducted into the Pro Football Hall of Fame. He was inducted into the Green Bay Packers Hall of Fame in 1972.

== Coaching career ==
Isbell started out at Purdue as an assistant coach in 1943 and took over as head coach in 1944. He coached there for three years with a 14–14–1 record.

In 1947, he became coach at the professional level, becoming the second head coach of the Baltimore Colts of the All-America Football Conference. As Colts' chief he became the first professional head coach of Y. A. Tittle, a future member of the Pro Football Hall of Fame. He remained at the helm of the Colts through his resignation after four games of the 1949 season.

In 1950 he took a position as backfield coach for the Chicago Cardinals of the NFL, serving in that capacity through the end of the 1951 campaign. In 1952 he became backfield coach for the Dallas Texans.

Isbell returned to the college ranks in 1953, taking a position as backfield coach of the Louisiana State University Tigers. After the 1953 season he quit football to pursue a career in business.

== Honors and death ==
Isbell was elected to the College Football Hall of Fame in 1967 and to the Green Bay Packers Hall of Fame in 1972.

On June 23, 1985, Isbell died in Hammond, Indiana. His tombstone gives his name as Cecil Fay Isbell.

== NFL career statistics ==
Legend
| | Won NFL Championship |
| | Led the league |
| **Bold** | Career high |

=== Regular season ===
| Year | Team | Games | | Passing | | | | | | | | | Rushing | | | | |
| Year | Team | GP | GS | Cmp | Att | Pct | Yds | Avg | Lng | TD | Int | Rtg | Att | Yds | Avg | Lng | TD |
|---|---|---|---|---|---|---|---|---|---|---|---|---|---|---|---|---|---|
| 1938 | GB | **11** | 4 | 37 | 91 | 40.7 | 659 | 7.2 | 53 | 8 | 10 | 55.9 | 85 | **445** | **5.2** | – | 2 |
| 1939 | GB | **11** | 5 | 43 | 103 | 41.7 | 749 | 7.3 | 51 | 6 | 5 | 66.4 | **132** | 407 | 3.1 | – | 2 |
| 1940 | GB | 10 | 5 | 68 | 150 | 45.3 | 1,037 | 6.9 | 47 | 8 | 12 | 53.1 | 97 | 270 | 2.8 | – | **4** |
| 1941 | GB | **11** | 4 | 117 | 206 | **56.8** | 1,479 | 7.2 | 56 | 15 | 11 | 81.4 | 72 | 317 | 4.4 | 24 | 1 |
| 1942 | GB | **11** | 6 | **146** | **268** | 54.5 | **2,021** | **7.5** | **73** | **24** | **14** | **87.0** | 36 | 83 | 2.3 | **32** | 1 |
| Career | | 54 | 24 | 411 | 818 | 50.2 | 5,945 | 7.3 | 73 | 61 | 52 | 72.6 | 422 | 1,522 | 3.6 | 32 | 10 |

== Head coaching record ==
=== College ===
| Year | Team | Overall | Conference | Standing | Bowl/playoffs |
|---|---|---|---|---|---|
**Purdue Boilermakers** (Big Ten Conference) (1944–1946)
| 1944 | Purdue | 5–5 | 4–2 | 3rd | |
| 1945 | Purdue | 7–3 | 3–3 | T–4th | |
| 1946 | Purdue | 2–6–1 | 0–5–1 | 9th | |
| Purdue: | | 14–14–1 | 7–10–1 | | |
| Total: | | 14–14–1 | | | |

=== Pro ===
| Team | League | Year | Regular season | | | | | Postseason | | | |
| Team | League | Year | Won | Lost | Ties | Win % | Finish | Won | Lost | Win % | Result |
|---|---|---|---|---|---|---|---|---|---|---|---|
| BCL | AAFC | 1947 | 2 | 11 | 1 | .154 | 4th in AAFC East | – | – | – | – |
| BCL | AAFC | 1948 | 7 | 7 | 0 | .500 | T–1st in AAFC East | 0 | 1 | .000 | **Lost to Buffalo Bills in Division Playoff.** |
| BCL | AAFC | 1949 | 0 | 4 | 0 | .000 | 6th in AAFC | – | – | – | – |
| CRD | NFL | 1951 | 1 | 1 | 0 | .500 | 6th in NFL | – | – | – | – |
| BCL total | | | 9 | 22 | 1 | .290 | | 0 | 1 | .000 | – |
| Total | | | 10 | 23 | 1 | .303 | | 0 | 1 | .000 | – |
