= Spadaccini =

Spadaccini is an Italian surname meaning 'Swordsman' or 'Sword maker'. Notable people with the surname include:

- Vic Spadaccini (1916–1981), Italian-American football player
