= Ferd Dreher =

American football player (1913–1996)

No. 20
- Position: End

Personal information
- Born: February 23, 1913; Jonesboro, Arkansas, U.S.
- Died: December 28, 1996 (aged 83); Jonesboro, Arkansas, U.S.
- Listed height: 6 ft 3 in (1.91 m)
- Listed weight: 205 lb (93 kg)

Career information
- High school: Jonesboro
- College: Denver (1934–1937)
- NFL draft: 1938: 12th round, 110th overall pick

Career history
- Chicago Bears (1938); St. Louis Gunners (1938–1939)

Career NFL statistics
- Receptions: 3
- Receiving yards: 69
- Receiving touchdowns: 1
- Stats at Pro Football Reference

Ferdinand "Ferd" Adolphus Dreher (February 23, 1913 – December 28, 1996) was an American professional football end who played one season with the Chicago Bears of the National Football League (NFL). He was selected by the Bears in the twelfth round of the 1938 NFL draft. He played college football at the University of Denver.

== Early life ==
Dreher attended Jonesboro High School in Jonesboro, Arkansas.

== College career ==
Dreher lettered in football for the Denver Pioneers from 1936 to 1937, earning two first-team all-conference awards. He recorded a team-high 30 points in 1936 and a second-best 35 points in 1937. He played basketball for the Pioneers from 1937 to 1938, helping the 1937 team to a 14–6 record while earning All-Rocky Mountain Conference honorable mention honors and also garnering third-team All-Skyline Conference accolades in 1938. Dreher also participated in track and field, winning the conference championships in the discus and shot put in 1937 and 1938. He played baseball in 1937. He earned seven letters as a Pioneer, two each in football, basketball and track while also earning one in baseball. Dreher was named the University of Denver Athlete of the Decade for the 1930s in May 1966. He was inducted into the University of Denver Athletics Hall of Fame in 2003.

== Professional career ==
Dreher was selected by the Chicago Bears of the NFL with the 110th (and final) pick in the 1938 NFL draft. He played in three games for the Bears during the 1938 season, recording 69 yards and one touchdown on three receptions.
