= Leo Katalinas =

American football player (1914–1977)

No. 11, 25, 14
- Position: Tackle

Personal information
- Born: February 4, 1915; Shenandoah, Pennsylvania, U.S.
- Died: July 8, 1977 (aged 62); Newark, New Jersey, U.S.
- Listed height: 6 ft 2 in (1.88 m)
- Listed weight: 240 lb (109 kg)

Career information
- High school: J. W. Cooper (PA)
- College: Catholic University (1934–1937)
- NFL draft: 1938: undrafted

Career history

Playing
- Green Bay Packers (1938); Paterson Panthers (1939–1942, 1946)

Coaching
- Paterson Panthers (1940) Line coach

Career NFL statistics
- Games played: 8 or 9 (Note: Pro-Football-Reference.com and Pro Football Archives conflict.)
- Stats at Pro Football Reference

Leo John Katalinas (February 4, 1915 – July 8, 1977) was an American professional football tackle and boxer. He played college football and boxed for the Catholic University Cardinals, being the runner-up in the NCAA Boxing Championship as a senior. He was not selected in the National Football League Draft but nonetheless signed with the Green Bay Packers in 1938, playing one season with them. He later played from 1939 to 1942, then in 1946 with the Paterson Panthers of the American Association (AA).

== Early life and education ==
Katalinas was born on February 4, 1915, in Shenandoah, Pennsylvania, and was of Finnish descent. He was the second-youngest of four brothers who played football; two of his brothers—Ed and Joe—each played at Georgetown, with Joe continuing on to play professionally. The youngest, John, played football at least through high school. He was nicknamed "Kats" or "Katz"; both Ed and Joe also were given the same nickname. Leo Katalinas attended J. W. Cooper High School in Shenandoah and is their only alumnus to play in the NFL.

=== College football ===
After graduating from J. W. Cooper, Katalinas began attending the Catholic University of America in 1934. He was a standout player on the freshman squad in his first year at the school. As a sophomore, he made the varsity team and became the backup to Ed Karpowich at tackle. He filled in at several points for Karpowich and received "high praise" for his play, with the Republican and Herald noting that the line functioned just as well with Katalinas as they had with Karpowich. He became a starter at tackle as a junior in 1936, earning his second varsity letter.

Katalinas remained a starter as a senior in 1937, being called a "star lineman." He placed second in voting and was thus selected to the Eastern College All-Star team, which played the Philadelphia Eagles in August 1938. He was the largest player on the All-Star team and received the nickname "Thor" (the German god of thunder) for his size (6 ft 2 in, 230 lb). Katalinas ended up sitting out the game after tearing a ligament in his knee 10 days prior.

=== College boxing ===
Katalinas also took up boxing as a sophomore at Catholic University, earning a knockout in his first match against Johnny Birkland while in the heavyweight category. A reporter for The Washington Herald noted afterwards that Katalinas so outclassed his opponent that

Birkland was forced to go through with a fight that might have maimed him for life. Smashed to the floor seven times, his face beaten lopsided in a bloody smear ... Katalinas, this towering giant, came rushing forward, taunted into a frenzy by Birkland's harmless blows, throwing terrific punches hard enough to kill a man less rugged and courageous ... Finally, with Birkland beaten to a pulp, his legs instinctively trying to regain the floor, a towel came from Maryland's corner.

Katalinas finished his first season with a record of 6–1, losing only one bout by decision. He was very successful in his collegiate boxing career and was described as a "sensation" in the ring; by midway through his senior season, he had not been knocked out a single time. His first defeat of 1938 came in his final collegiate match, losing by decision in the national championship to Ashby Dickerson of Virginia. The Washington Herald sportswriter Dick O'Brien called the fight "one of the greatest collegiate heavyweight battles ever witnessed in Virginia's memorial gymnasium."

== Professional career ==
Prior to finishing his college football career, Katalinas had been contacted by the NFL's New York Giants about a future tryout. He was not selected in the 1938 NFL draft but immediately after was signed by the Green Bay Packers as an undrafted free agent. He made the final roster as their third-string tackle and made his NFL debut in their season-opening win over the Cleveland Rams. Katalinas appeared in eight or nine games, all as a backup, and helped the Packers reach the 1938 NFL Championship Game, where they lost to the Giants by one score.

Katalinas was released by the Packers in August 1939. Shortly afterwards, he joined the Paterson Panthers of the minor league American Association. He appeared in 11 games, 10 as a starter, for the 1939 Panthers, helping them win the divisional championship. He continued playing for them through 1942, additionally serving as line coach in 1940, and appeared in 33 games for the team across his first four seasons, 27 of which he started. Following a stint in the United States Marine Corps during World War II, Katalinas returned to Paterson for a final season in 1946, playing nine games, eight of which he started. He finished his football career having played eight or nine games in the NFL and 42 games with Paterson.

== Later life and death ==
Katalinas later lived in Teaneck, New Jersey. He died on July 8, 1977, at the age of 62, due to injuries he sustained in a car crash on June 30.
