= List of Butler Bulldogs in the NFL draft =

This is a list of Butler Bulldogs players in the NFL draft.

== Key ==
B	Back	K	Kicker	NT	Nose tackle
C	Center	LB	Linebacker	FB	Fullback
DB	Defensive back	P	Punter	HB	Halfback
DE	Defensive end	QB	Quarterback	WR	Wide receiver
DT	Defensive tackle	RB	Running back	G	Guard
E	End	T	Offensive tackle	TE	Tight end

= Pro Bowler
= Hall of Famer

== Selections ==
Year	Round	Pick	Player	Team	Position
1938	10	90	John Wager	Chicago Bears	OT
1957	20	230	Leroy Thompson	Philadelphia Eagles	B
