= Johnny Blood =

American football player and coach (1903–1985)

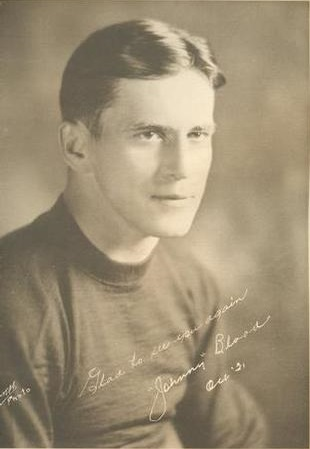
- McNally in 1932

No. 57, 1, 24, 20, 14, 10, 26, 55, 15
- Position: Halfback

Personal information
- Born: November 27, 1903; New Richmond, Wisconsin, U.S.
- Died: November 28, 1985 (aged 82); Palm Springs, California, U.S.
- Listed height: 6 ft 1 in (1.85 m)
- Listed weight: 188 lb (85 kg)

Career information
- High school: New Richmond
- College: Saint John's (MN); Notre Dame

Career history

Playing
- Milwaukee Badgers (1925–1926); Duluth Eskimos (1926–1927); Pottsville Maroons (1928); Green Bay Packers (1929–1933); Pittsburgh Pirates (1934); Green Bay Packers (1935–1936); Pittsburgh Pirates (1937–1938); Buffalo Tigers (1941)

Coaching
- Pittsburgh Pirates (1937–1939); Kenosha Cardinals (1940–1941); Saint John's (MN) (1950–1952)

Awards and highlights
- 4× NFL champion (1929, 1930, 1931, 1936); NFL receiving touchdowns co-leader (1933); NFL 1930s All-Decade Team; Green Bay Packers Hall of Fame (1970); Pittsburgh Steelers Hall of Honor (2017)
- Military career
- Allegiance: United States
- Branch: U.S. Army Air Corps
- Service years: 1941–1945
- Conflicts: World War II; India Theater
- Coaching profile at Pro Football Reference
- Stats at Pro Football Reference
- Pro Football Hall of Fame

John Victor McNally Jr. (November 27, 1903 – November 28, 1985), best known by his playing alias Johnny Blood, was an American professional football player and coach. McNally was named a member of the NFL 1930s All-Decade Team and was inducted into the Pro Football Hall of Fame as a player in 1963, as one of the Hall of Fame's 17 charter members.

McNally played for six different teams between 1925 and 1941, with his longest tenure being with the Green Bay Packers, first from 1929 to 1933 and then from 1935 to 1936. McNally served in the United States Army Air Corps during World War II. Following the war he attempted to return to football in 1945, but an injury ended his playing career.

McNally held the record for receiving touchdowns by a half back/running back, with 37, until his record was broken by Christian McCaffrey in 2026.

== Early life ==
John Victor McNally Jr. was born as the fourth of six surviving children to parents, Mary and John McNally Sr. Mary was the daughter of two Irish immigrants. A native of New Richmond, Wisconsin, McNally graduated from high school at age 14. He never played high school sports, but earned letters in football, baseball, basketball, and track at Saint John's University in Collegeville, Minnesota. McNally transferred to Notre Dame in 1926, but never played a down for the Fighting Irish, and left school to play semi-professional football. He did not earn his degree until 1946 after retiring from the game.

== Professional career ==
In 1922, while working for a newspaper in Minneapolis and still answering to the name John McNally, he and a friend, Ralph Hanson, heard they could make extra money by playing football for a semipro football team in the city. They decided to try out under fake names, which would protect McNally's amateur standing in case Notre Dame agreed to take McNally back someday after having been kicked out. They headed over to the team's practice field on McNally's motorcycle. "On the way there", McNally said, "we passed a theater on Hennepin Avenue, and up on the marquee I saw the name of the movie that was playing, Blood and Sand with Rudolph Valentino. Ralph was behind me on the motorcycle, and I turned my head and shouted, 'That's it. I'll be Blood and you be Sand.'" McNally made the team, but it was a few years before he made football history while playing with the Green Bay Packers and five other NFL teams.

Starting in 1925, McNally made a tour of pro football franchises—the Milwaukee Badgers (1925–26), Duluth Eskimos (1926–27), Pottsville Maroons (1928), Green Bay Packers (1929–33), Pittsburgh Pirates (1934), the Packers again (1935–36), and the Pirates again as player-coach (1937–39).

McNally played in the National Football League for 14 seasons, with five different teams. In his prime, McNally was 6'1" and 188 lbs., known for his speed, agility, and pass-catching ability. He got his professional start in 1925 with the Milwaukee Badgers, where he became famous as the "Vagabond Halfback" for his off-the-field behavior and spontaneity. In 1926 and 1927 he played for the Duluth Eskimos, with fellow Pro Football Hall of Famer, Ernie Nevers.

In 1928 McNally switched teams and came to Pottsville along with Walt Kiesling, another Pro Football Hall of Famer-to-be. On November 25, 1928, the NFL's Pottsville Maroons played the visiting Green Bay Packers at Minersville Park in a driving snow storm. In a 26–0 lopsided win over the Packers, McNally scored the last two touchdowns of the game; his second coming on a 65-yard run after an interception. Although no one at Minersville Park knew it at the time, that touchdown would be the last Pottsville would ever score in the NFL.

After the Maroons folded in 1928, McNally went to the team against which he scored Pottsville's last NFL touchdowns: the Green Bay Packers. When coach Curly Lambeau first negotiated a contract with McNally to play for the Packers he offered him a $110 a week if he wouldn't drink after Wednesday and $100 a week if he did. McNally allegedly took the $100, although a later story said Lambeau said he would give him the $110 and let him drink on Wednesday for being so honest about it. Between 1929 and 1933, 1935–1936, McNally played with the Packers where he helped them win four championships. He helped lead the Packers to three championships in a row: 1929–1931, as well as in 1936. He wore several different uniform numbers during his Packers career, including 14 (1933–34), 20 (1931–32), 24 (1929–30), 26 (1935), and 55 (1936).

In 1937, McNally moved on to the Pittsburgh Steelers (then called the Pirates), where on his first play he ran back a kick 92 yards for a touchdown. He ended his NFL career in 1939 as the head coach of the Pirates. One day in 1941, McNally took a day off from his coaching duties for the Kenosha Cardinals minor league football team and played one game with the Buffalo Tigers of the third American Football League.

== Coaching career ==
The Pittsburgh's President Art Rooney hired McNally for the 1937 season to be both a player and a coach for the NFL's Pirates. In his first season as coach, McNally's team was able to muster only a 4–7 record, which was still good enough for 3rd place in the NFL Eastern conference. McNally and his squad fared worse in 1938, however, posting only a 2–9 record. They finished 5th out of six teams in the NFL Eastern conference.

During the 1938 season, which would be McNally's last full season as coach, the Pirates were set to play the rival Philadelphia Eagles at Laidley Field in Charleston, West Virginia on November 20, but McNally was nowhere to be seen. As the story is often told, McNally was instead attending a football game at the Rose Bowl in Los Angeles. Friends in the press box questioned McNally as to why he was on the West Coast and he replied that the Pirates had an open date. The scoreboard, however, proved otherwise. Pittsburgh was on the road playing without its boss present. "I was going to fire him", Rooney later said, "But the players loved him. So I told him, 'John, you have to make the games.'"

McNally began the Pirates' 1939 season as head coach, but following a 32–0 loss to the Chicago Bears at Forbes Field, and the third consecutive loss to start the season, McNally tendered his resignation to Rooney. The Pirates went 7–25–1 (.318) in his three seasons before being replaced by Walt Kiesling in 1939.

Rooney later called McNally the most memorable character he knew during his career. "Nobody would even believe some of the things he did", said Rooney. "As one of our veterans once said, 'This is the only team I've been on where the players worry about the coach instead of the other way around.'"

For the 1940 and 1941 seasons, McNally took over the coaching position with the Kenosha Cardinals, an independent pro team that had formerly played in the American Professional Football Association of 1939. For two games, he and two of his players loaned themselves to the Buffalo Tigers of the American Football League (1940), with McNally playing in one of the games. (By doing so, McNally became the only alumnus of the 1940 AFL to eventually reach the Hall of Fame.)

McNally coached football again at St. John's University (Minnesota) from 1950 to 1952 where he amassed 13–9 record during his three-year stint. When leaving Saint John's he told incoming head coach John Gagliardi that "nobody can win at Saint John's." Gagliardi went on to become the winningest head coach in college football regardless of division and coached at St. John's from 1953 until his retirement after the 2012 season.

== Legendary antics ==
McNally earned a reputation for extracurricular exploits both on and off the football field that contributed to the legend of the man; it is generally accepted that some of McNally's exploits were tall tales. The exploits of McNally that can be substantiated include:

- Jumping across a narrow ledge six stories from the ground to gain access to a Los Angeles hotel room.
- Fleeing a towel fight with Packers end Lavvie Dilweg by climbing on top of a fast-moving train and crawling across car tops. After clinching the 1931 league championship, the Packers celebrated on the train ride back to Green Bay from New York with a party, which included an impromptu towel fight. During the towel fight, McNally angered the towering Dilweg, who chased McNally through the railroad cars and trapped him on the rear platform. McNally then hoisted himself on top of the car and made his way across the top of the moving train until he reached the engine compartment, where he spent the remainder of the trip.
- Playing almost an entire game with a collapsed kidney.
- Having to be rescued by teammates while attempting chin-ups on the stern's flagpole of the ocean liner SS Mariposa (1931) while traveling across the Pacific Ocean for a barnstorming game in Hawaii.
- Riding the blinds between trains on the way to training camp to avoid having to pay a fare, which earned him the nickname "the Vagabond Halfback."
- Once ran 50 yards for a touchdown on a lateral from quarterback Red Dunn. When Dunn called the same play later in the game, McNally simply smiled and lateraled the ball back to him.
- Climbing down the face of a hotel in downtown Chicago to avoid curfew and recite poetry to the swooning women below.
- McNally was famous for perching on hotel ledges and the tops of bar tables as he sang the song Galway Bay.
- He once passed up an opportunity to purchase an NFL franchise for $1200.
- Alan Robinson of the Associated Press recalled that McNally "once pulled his car directly into the path of the team train that he'd missed during a late night of wine, women and song. He wasn't even fined, or suspended—after all, he was the coach."
- Augie Ratner, a perfectly healthy ex-featherweight boxer, advertised his own funeral in a Minneapolis paper in 1971, to which McNally wrote, "I'll be sad when you are dead." McNally then offered a bet on which of them would live longest; he wrote, "The one who goes first loses a grand to the one who survives. The loser won't miss the money, and it will console the winner for the loss of a friend. May I live a long time and you forever." Ratner accepted the proposal; both men had the $1,000 bequest put into their wills. McNally, who survived six years after Ratner's death, won the bet.

== Later life ==
The day after Pearl Harbor was attacked in the Second World War, McNally enlisted in the United States Army Air Corps and served in India as a cryptographer. After the war McNally attempted to rejoin the Packers in 1945 but was injured by two tacklers while returning a punt in an exhibition game and retired permanently from professional football.

Returning to St. John's, McNally earned a degree in 1946 and stayed a few years as a teacher and a coach for several different sports. Later he would return to his hometown of New Richmond, Wisconsin to run an employment agency. In 1958 McNally was an unsuccessful candidate for county sheriff running on a platform promising "honest wrestling."

McNally also entered the University of Minnesota at the age of 50, where he later earned his master's degree in economics.

When the Pro Football Hall of Fame was founded in 1963, McNally was among the 17-member inaugural class, which included Curly Lambeau, Jim Thorpe, Sammy Baugh, and Bronko Nagurski. Then in 1970, when the Green Bay Packers Hall of Fame was founded, McNally was among its first eight inductees. He was also an inaugural member of the Pittsburgh Steelers Hall of Honor in 2017.

== Personal life ==
McNally was married twice; first to Marguerite Streater, whom he married in the 1940s, and then to Catherine Kopp, whom he married in 1966.

On November 28, 1985, McNally died from the complications of a stroke in Palm Springs, California. He was 82. A marker for McNally is placed at Immaculate Conception Cemetery in New Richmond, Wisconsin.

== Head coaching record ==
=== NFL ===
Team	Year	Regular season					Postseason			
Team	Year	Won	Lost	Ties	Win %	Finish	Won	Lost	Win %	Result
PIT	1937	4	7	0	.364	3rd in Eastern Division	-	-	-	-
PIT	1938	2	9	0	.182	5th in Eastern Division	-	-	-	-
PIT	1939	0	3	0	.000	(Resigned)	-	-	-	-
Total		6	19	0	.240		-	-	-	-

=== College ===
Year	Team	Overall	Conference	Standing	Bowl/playoffs
Saint John's Johnnies (Minnesota Intercollegiate Athletic Conference) (1950–1952)
1950	Saint John's	4–3	3–3	T–5th	
1951	Saint John's	4–3	4–1	4th	
1952	Saint John's	5–3	3–3	T–4th	
Saint John's:		13–9	10–7		
Total:		13–9			
