= Joseph T. Maras =

American football player and coach (1916–1990)

Joe Maras
No. 14
- Position: Center

Personal information
- Born: January 19, 1916; Hibbing, Minnesota, U.S.
- Died: September 17, 1990 (aged 74); Schenectady, New York, U.S.
- Listed height: 6 ft 1 in (1.85 m)
- Listed weight: 203 lb (92 kg)

Career information
- High school: Hibbing
- College: Duquesne (1937)
- NFL draft: 1938: 10th round, 81st overall pick

Career history

Playing
- Boston Shamrocks (1938); Pittsburgh Steelers (1938–1940)

Coaching
- Columbia (1957–1959) Line coach; Union (NY) (1960–1963) Head coach

Career NFL statistics
- Games played: 17
- Stats at Pro Football Reference

Head coaching record
- Career: 8–23–1 (.266)

Joseph Thomas Maras (January 19, 1916 – September 17, 1990) was an American football player and coach. He played for three seasons for the Pittsburgh Steelers organization of the National Football League (NFL) from 1938 to 1940. Maras served as the head football coach at Union University in Schenectady, New York from 1960 to 1963, compiling a record of 8–23–1. He played college football at Duquesne University in Pittsburgh and was selected in the tenth round of the 1938 NFL draft by the Cleveland Rams.

== Head coaching record ==
Year	Team	Overall	Conference	Standing	Bowl/playoffs
Union Dutchmen (NCAA College Division independent) (1960–1963)
1960	Union	2–5–1			
1961	Union	3–5			
1962	Union	1–7			
1963	Union	2–6			
Union:		8–23–1			
Total:		8–23–1			
