= 1938 Pittsburgh Pirates (NFL) season =

NFL team season

1938 Pittsburgh Pirates season
- Owner: Art Rooney
- Head coach: Johnny Blood
- Home stadium: Forbes Field

Results
- Record: 2–9
- Division place: 5th NFL Eastern
- Playoffs: Did not qualify
- Pro Bowlers: Stu Smith; Byron Gentry

The 1938 Pittsburgh Pirates season was their sixth as a professional football club in the National Football League (NFL). The '38 Pirates welcomed back Johnny Blood as head coach after finishing with a 4–10 record the previous year. Blood coached the team's second 2-win season in 3 years, as they placed last in the NFL Eastern Division.

The '38 team welcomed one of the Steelers' best players during their tenure as "the Pirates" (1933-1940). Art Rooney signed college phenom Byron "Whizzer" White for one season and was given a huge contract. White led the league in rushing that year, and became the first player to do so whilst playing for a losing team. He left the team the next year to pursue his studies overseas, he did however return as a Lion in 1940.

== Preseason ==
- September 3, 1938: at St. Rosalia Preps of Wilkinsburg, Pennsylvania: win 54–0
- September 4, 1938: at Modern Athletic Club of Jeannette, Pennsylvania: win 46–0

=== 1938 NFL draft ===
Pittsburgh Pirates 1938 NFL Draft selections
| Draft order | | | Player name | Position | College | Notes |
| Round | Choice | Overall | Player name | Position | College | Notes |
|---|---|---|---|---|---|---|
| 1 | 4 | 4 | Byron White | Back | Colorado | Played 1 season with Pirates in 1938 |
| 2 | 4 | 14 | Frank Filchock | Back | Indiana | Played 1 season for Pirates in 1938 |
| 3 | 4 | 19 | Hugh Wolfe | Back | Texas | Played for Giants |
| 4 | 4 | 29 | Tony Matisi | Tackle | Pittsburgh | Played for Lions |
| 5 | 4 | 34 | Lou Midler | Tackle | Minnesota | Played 2 seasons for Pirates |
| 6 | 4 | 44 | George Platukis | End | Duquesne | Played 4 season for Pirates/Steelers |
| 7 | 4 | 54 | Ray King | End | Minnesota | |
| 8 | 4 | 64 | Tom Burnette | Halfback | North Carolina | |
| 9 | 4 | 74 | Paul McDonough | End | Utah | Played 1 season for Pirates in 1938 |
| 10 | 4 | 84 | Paul McCarty | Center | Notre Dame | |
| 11 | 4 | 94 | Bill Krause | Guard | Baldwin–Wallace | |
| 12 | 4 | 104 | Joe Kuharich | Guard | Notre Dame | Never played for Pirates |

The Pirates selected one of their best draft picks of that era in Byron "Whizzer" White from Colorado. He was given a large $15,000 contract to play in 1938. White finished the season with 152 rushes for 567 yards, 4 TD, and 7 catches for 88 yards. After the season, he continued his studies overseas. He did return and play for the Detroit Lions in 1940 and 1941.

== Regular season ==
=== Schedule ===
| Week | Date | Opponent | Result | Record |
|---|---|---|---|---|
| 1 | September 9 | at Detroit Lions | L 7–16 | 0–1 |
| 2 | September 11 | New York Giants | L 14–27 | 0–2 |
| 3 | September 16 | Philadelphia Eagles | L 7–27 | 0–3 |
| 4 | September 23 | at Brooklyn Dodgers | W 17–3 | 1–3 |
| 5 | October 3 | at New York Giants | W 13–10 | 2–3 |
| 6 | October 9 | Brooklyn Dodgers | L 7–17 | 2–4 |
| 7 | October 23 | at Green Bay Packers | L 0–20 | 2–5 |
| 8 | November 6 | Washington Redskins | L 0–7 | 2–6 |
| 9 | November 20 | at Philadelphia Eagles | L 7–14 | 2–7 |
| 10 | November 27 | at Washington Redskins | L 0–15 | 2–8 |
| 11 | December 4 | Cleveland Rams | L 7–13 | 2–9 |

=== Game summaries ===
==== Week 1 (Friday September 9, 1938): Detroit Lions ====
| | 1 | 2 | 3 | 4 | Total |
|---|---|---|---|---|---|
| Pirates | 0 | 0 | 0 | 7 | 7 |
| Lions | 9 | 7 | 0 | 0 | 16 |

at Titan Stadium, Detroit, Michigan

- Game time:
- Game weather:
- Game attendance: 17,000
- Referee:

Scoring Drives:

- Detroit – FG Shepherd 27
- Detroit – Caddel 5 run (kick failed)
- Detroit – Cardwell 5 run (Moscrip kick)
- Pittsburgh – White 3 run (Niccolai kick)

==== Week 2 (Sunday, September 11, 1938): New York Giants ====
| | 1 | 2 | 3 | 4 | Total |
|---|---|---|---|---|---|
| Giants | 6 | 14 | 0 | 7 | 27 |
| Pirates | 7 | 7 | 0 | 0 | 14 |

at Forbes Field, Pittsburgh, Pennsylvania

- Game time:
- Game weather:
- Game attendance: 17,340
- Referee:

Scoring Drives:

- Pittsburgh – White 4 run (Niccolai kick)
- New York – Leemans 1 run (kick blocked)
- Pittsburgh – Manske 23 pass from Filchock (Niccolai kick)
- New York – Shaffer 3 pass from Danowski (Soar kick)
- New York – Shaffer 11 pass from Danowski (Cuff kick)
- New York – Soar 1 run (Soar kick)

==== Week 3 (Friday September 16, 1938): Philadelphia Eagles ====
| | 1 | 2 | 3 | 4 | Total |
|---|---|---|---|---|---|
| Eagles | 7 | 13 | 7 | 0 | 27 |
| Pirates | 0 | 0 | 0 | 7 | 7 |

at Civic Stadium, Buffalo, New York

- Game time:
- Game weather:
- Game attendance: 19,749
- Referee: Tommie Hughitt

Scoring Drives:

- Philadelphia – Arnold 20 fumble run (Smukler kick)
- Philadelphia – Arnold 34 pass from Riffle (Reese kick)
- Philadelphia – Arnold 23 interception (kick failed)
- Philadelphia – Riffle 44 run (Smukler kick)
- Pittsburgh – White 1 run (Niccolai kick)

==== Week 4 (Friday September 23, 1938): Brooklyn Dodgers ====
| | 1 | 2 | 3 | 4 | Total |
|---|---|---|---|---|---|
| Pirates | 0 | 0 | 7 | 10 | 17 |
| Dodgers | 3 | 0 | 0 | 0 | 3 |

at Ebbets Field, Brooklyn, New York

- Game time:
- Game weather:
- Game attendance: 21,494
- Referee:

Scoring Drives:

- Brooklyn – FG Reissig 18
- Pittsburgh – Manske 27 fumble run (Niccolai kick)
- Pittsburgh – Thompson 5 run (Niccolai kick)
- Pittsburgh – FG Niccolai 18

==== Week 5 (Monday October 3, 1938): New York Giants ====
Prior to this game, the Pirates played an exhibition against the Boston Shamrocks, winning 16–6.

| | 1 | 2 | 3 | 4 | Total |
|---|---|---|---|---|---|
| Pirates | 0 | 7 | 0 | 6 | 13 |
| Giants | 7 | 0 | 3 | 0 | 10 |

at Polo Grounds, New York, NY

- Game time:
- Game weather:
- Game attendance: 18,805
- Referee:

Scoring Drives:

- New York – Cuff 18 pass from Danowski (Cuff kick)
- Pittsburgh – Sortet 24 pass from Filchock (Niccolai kick)
- New York – FG Cuff 10
- Pittsburgh – Sortet 13 pass from Filchock (kick failed)

==== Week 6 (Sunday October 9, 1938): Brooklyn Dodgers ====
| | 1 | 2 | 3 | 4 | Total |
|---|---|---|---|---|---|
| Dodgers | 0 | 10 | 0 | 7 | 17 |
| Pirates | 0 | 7 | 0 | 0 | 7 |

at Forbes Field, Pittsburgh, Pennsylvania

- Game time:
- Game weather:
- Game attendance:
- Referee:

Scoring Drives:

- Brooklyn – FG Kercheval 34
- Pittsburgh – Sortet 50 pass from White (Niccolai kick)
- Brooklyn – Barreturnt 54 pass from Parker (Kercheval kick)
- Brooklyn – Parker 77 run (Parker kick)

==== Week 7 (Sunday October 23, 1938): Green Bay Packers ====
| | 1 | 2 | 3 | 4 | Total |
|---|---|---|---|---|---|
| Pirates | 0 | 0 | 0 | 0 | 0 |
| Packers | 7 | 0 | 6 | 7 | 20 |

at Forbes Field, Pittsburgh, Pennsylvania

- Game time:
- Game weather:
- Game attendance: 12,142
- Referee:

Scoring Drives:

- Green Bay – Isbell 38 run (Hinkle kick)
- Green Bay – Laws 38 interception (kick failed)
- Green Bay – Mullenaux 19 pass from Monnett (Monnett kick)

==== Week 8: Bye week ====
During their bye week, the Pirates scheduled two exhibition games, both wins against the Warren Redjackets (23–0 on Sunday, October 30) and McKeesport Olympics (21–6 on Monday, October 31).

==== Week 9 (Sunday November 6, 1938): Washington Redskins ====
| | 1 | 2 | 3 | 4 | Total |
|---|---|---|---|---|---|
| Redskins | 0 | 0 | 0 | 7 | 7 |
| Pirates | 0 | 0 | 0 | 0 | 0 |

at Forbes Field, Pittsburgh, Pennsylvania

- Game time:
- Game weather:
- Game attendance: 12,910
- Referee:

Scoring Drives:

- Washington – Karamatic 39 pass from Baugh (Manton kick)

==== Week 10: Bye week ====
During a second bye week, the Pirates scheduled a two-legged tie against the Los Angeles Bulldogs. The first game, an Armistice Day special, was held at Will Rogers Memorial Stadium in Colorado Springs, Colorado (in Pirates star Byron White's home state) on November 11. The Pirates lost that game, 17–6, in front of a crowd of 15,000 fans. The second leg of the series was held at the Bulldogs' home field, Gilmore Stadium, at which the Pirates and Bulldogs played to a 14–14 draw in front of 18,000 fans.

==== Week 11 (Sunday November 20, 1938): Philadelphia Eagles ====
| | 1 | 2 | 3 | 4 | Total |
|---|---|---|---|---|---|
| Pirates | 0 | 0 | 7 | 0 | 7 |
| Eagles | 7 | 0 | 0 | 7 | 14 |

at Laidley Field, Charleston, West Virginia

- Game time:
- Game weather:
- Game attendance: 6,500
- Referee:

Scoring Drives:

- Philadelphia – Hewitt pass from Smukler (Smukler kick)
- Pittsburgh – White 79 run (Niccolai kick)
- Philadelphia – Carter 11 pas from Smukler (Reese kick)

==== Week 12 (Sunday November 27, 1938): Washington Redskins ====
| | 1 | 2 | 3 | 4 | Total |
|---|---|---|---|---|---|
| Pirates | 0 | 0 | 0 | 0 | 0 |
| Redskins | 3 | 0 | 0 | 12 | 15 |

at Griffith Stadium, Washington, DC

- Game time:
- Game weather:
- Game attendance: 22,000
- Referee:

Scoring Drives:

- Washington – FG Manton 23
- Washington – Millner pass from Baugh
- Washington – McChesney 52 pass from Baugh (kick failed)

==== Week 13 (Tuesday December 4, 1938): Cleveland Rams ====
| | 1 | 2 | 3 | 4 | Total |
|---|---|---|---|---|---|
| Rams | 7 | 0 | 6 | 0 | 13 |
| Pirates | 0 | 0 | 0 | 7 | 7 |

at Tulane Stadium, New Orleans, Louisiana

- Game time:
- Game weather:
- Game attendance: 7,500
- Referee:

Scoring Drives:

- Cleveland – Benton 28 pass from Snyder (Snyder kick)
- Cleveland – Benton 11 pass from Snyder (kick failed)
- Pittsburgh – Sortet 8 pass from White (Niccolai kick)

== Standings ==
NFL Eastern Division
| | W | L | T | PCT | DIV | PF | PA | STK |
|---|---|---|---|---|---|---|---|---|
| New York Giants | 8 | 2 | 1 | .800 | 5–2–1 | 194 | 79 | W1 |
| Washington Redskins | 6 | 3 | 2 | .667 | 4–2–2 | 148 | 154 | L1 |
| Brooklyn Dodgers | 4 | 4 | 3 | .500 | 3–2–3 | 131 | 161 | T1 |
| Philadelphia Eagles | 5 | 6 | 0 | .455 | 3–5 | 154 | 164 | W2 |
| Pittsburgh Pirates | 2 | 9 | 0 | .182 | 2–6 | 79 | 169 | L6 |

Note: Tie games were not officially counted in the standings until 1972.
