= Pete Tinsley =

American football player (1913–1995)

No. 21
- Position: Guard

Personal information
- Born: March 16, 1913; Sumter, South Carolina, U.S.
- Died: May 11, 1995 (aged 82); Iron Mountain, Michigan, U.S.
- Listed height: 5 ft 8 in (1.73 m)
- Listed weight: 205 lb (93 kg)

Career information
- High school: Spartanburg (SC)
- College: Georgia (1934-1937)
- NFL draft: 1938: 11th round, 97th overall pick

Career history
- Green Bay Packers (1938–1945)

Awards and highlights
- 2× NFL champion (1939, 1944); Pro Bowl (1939); Green Bay Packers Hall of Fame

Career NFL statistics
- Games played: 76
- Games started: 31
- Interceptions: 4
- Stats at Pro Football Reference

Elijah Pope "Pete" Tinsley (March 16, 1913 – May 11, 1995) was a professional football player, born in Sumter, South Carolina. He was drafted in the 11th round of the 1938 NFL Draft. He played guard, defense and offense for eight seasons for the Green Bay Packers. He was inducted into the Green Bay Packers Hall of Fame in 1979.
