= Richard Nardi =

American football player (1915–1965)

No. 4, 5, 10
- Position: Back

Personal information
- Born: September 25, 1915; Cleveland, Ohio, U.S.
- Died: January 28, 1965 (aged 49); East Cleveland, Ohio, U.S.
- Listed height: 5 ft 10 in (1.78 m)
- Listed weight: 200 lb (91 kg)

Career information
- High school: Collinwood (OH)
- College: Ohio State
- NFL draft: 1938: 8th round, 66th overall pick

Career history
- Detroit Lions (1938); Pittsburgh Pirates (1939); Brooklyn Dodgers (1939)

Career NFL statistics
- Rushing yards: 124
- Rushing average: 4.1
- Receptions: 1
- Receiving yards: 3
- Stats at Pro Football Reference

Richard Louis Nardi (September 25, 1915 – January 28, 1965) was an American professional football player who played in 14 career games for the Detroit Lions, Brooklyn Dodgers and Pittsburgh Pirates of the National Football League (NFL) from 1938 to 1939. He was selected in the eighth round of the 1938 NFL draft.
