= Ray Hamilton (defensive end) =

American football and basketball player (1916–1995)

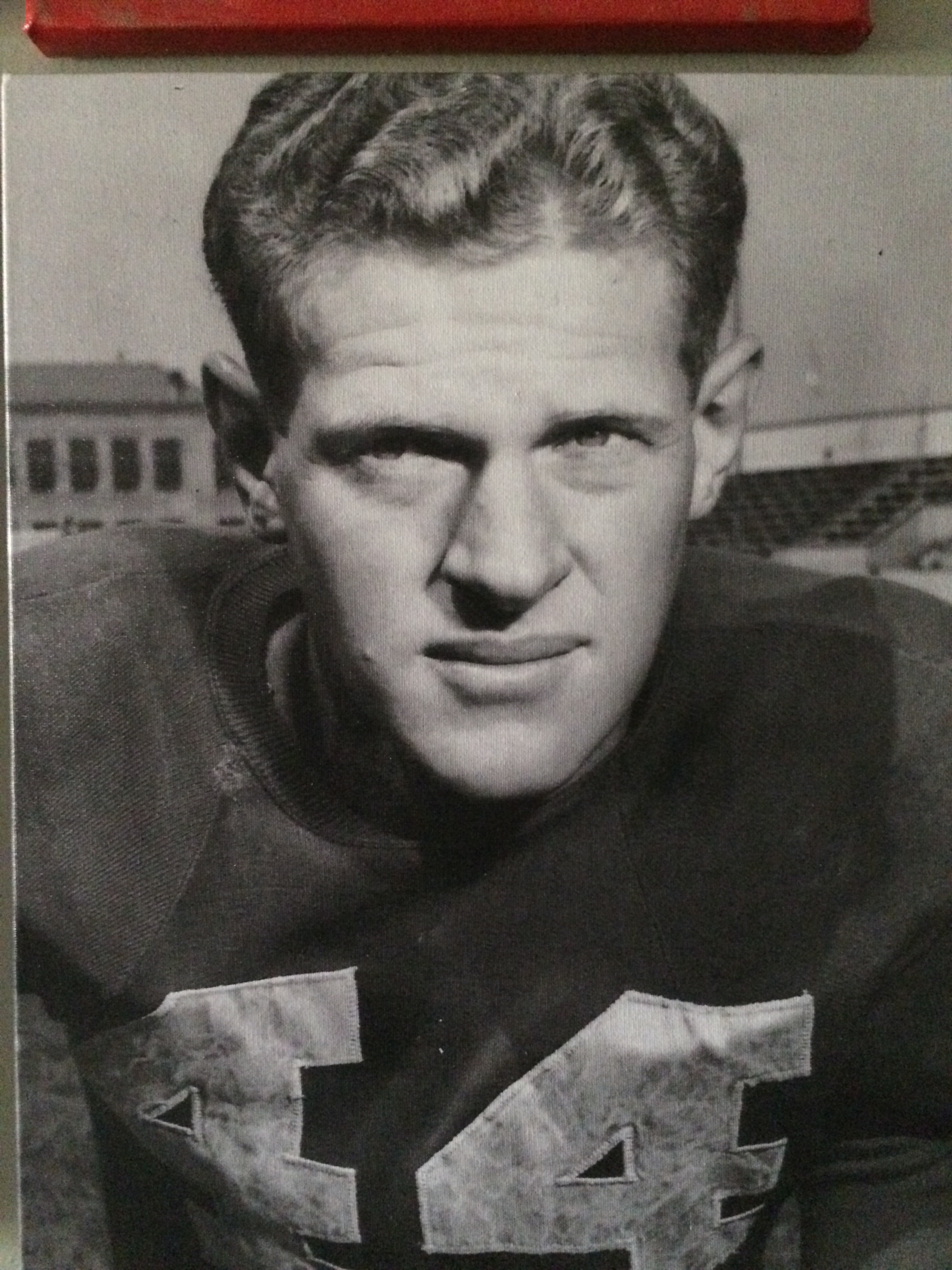
- Ray Hamilton as a Cleveland Ram

No. 27, 42, 44
- Positions: Defensive end, End

Personal information
- Born: January 21, 1916; Sheridan, Arkansas, U.S.
- Died: February 13, 1995 (aged 79)
- Listed height: 6 ft 4 in (1.93 m)
- Listed weight: 212 lb (96 kg)

Career information
- High school: Sheridan
- College: Arkansas (1934-1937)
- NFL draft: 1938: 6th round, 41st overall pick

Career history
- Cleveland Rams (1938); Detroit Lions (1939); Cleveland / Los Angeles Rams (1944–1947)

Awards and highlights
- NFL champion (1945); Arkansas Sports Hall of Fame (1973)

Career NFL statistics
- Receptions: 40
- Receiving yards: 688
- Touchdowns: 2
- Fumble recoveries: 6
- Stats at Pro Football Reference

Raymond Hamilton (June 6, 1916 – February 13, 1995) was a standout football and basketball player for the University of Arkansas and a professional football player in the National Football League (NFL), where he played for the Cleveland / Los Angeles Rams and the Detroit Lions.

== College career ==
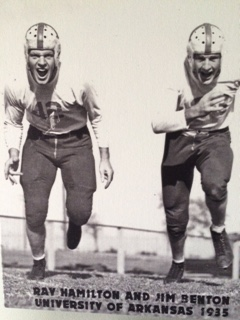
Ray Hamilton and Jim Benton, Arkansas Razorbacks, 1935

A member of the Arkansas Razorbacks 1930's All-Decade Team, he lettered in football in 1935, 1936, and 1937. In 1936, Hamilton played both sides of the ball playing a key role in defeating the Texas Longhorns 6–0 to win their first ever Southwest Conference Championship. He also lettered in basketball in 1936, 1937, and 1938.

== Professional career ==
In 1938, he was drafted by the Cleveland Rams joining his college teammate Jim Benton. In 1939, Hamilton played for the Detroit Lions playing both ways shifting from offensive end to defensive end. In 1940, Hamilton joined the United States Army where he worked himself up to the rank of Army Intelligence captain. After spending time on an Alaskan base, he received his release from the Army in 1943. In 1944 and 1945, he went back to the Cleveland Rams winning an NFL championship in 1945 defeating the Washington Redskins 15–14. With the Rams moving to Los Angeles, Hamilton finished his NFL career with the L.A. Rams in 1946 and 1947.

== Hall of Fame ==
On January 19, 1973, former college and pro teammate Jim Benton introduced Ray Hamilton as he was inducted into the Arkansas Sports Hall of Fame. On November 15, 2002, he was inducted into the University of Arkansas Sports Hall of Honor.
