= Red Chesbro =

American football player (1914–1970)

No. 35
- Positions: Tackle, guard

Personal information
- Born: August 22, 1914; Brookfield, New York, U.S.
- Died: April 11, 1970 (aged 55); Hamilton, New York, U.S.
- Listed height: 5 ft 11 in (1.80 m)
- Listed weight: 190 lb (86 kg)

Career information
- High school: Hamilton (NY)
- College: Colgate
- NFL draft: 1938: 7th round, 51st overall pick

Career history
- Cleveland Rams (1938)

Awards and highlights
- First-team All-American (1936)

Career NFL statistics
- Games played: 8
- Games started: 2
- Stats at Pro Football Reference

Marcel Marcus "Red" Chesbro (August 22, 1914 – April 11, 1970) was an American professional football player. A native of New York, Chesbro attended Colgate University. He played college football for the Colgate Red Raiders football team and was selected by Liberty magazine as a first-team tackle on the 1936 College Football All-America Team. He was drafted in the seventh round of the 1938 NFL Draft. He played professional football as a guard for the Cleveland Rams during the 1938 NFL season. He later became an executive with Eastner Rock Products Co. of Oriskany Falls, New York.
