= 1938 Philadelphia Eagles season =

NFL team season

- Owner: Bert Bell
- Head coach: Bert Bell
- Home stadium: Philadelphia Municipal Stadium

Results
- Record: 5–6
- Division place: 4th NFL Eastern
- Playoffs: Did not qualify

The 1938 Philadelphia Eagles season was the franchise's 6th season in the National Football League (NFL). The team improved on their previous output of 2–8–1, winning five games. The team failed to qualify for the playoffs for the sixth consecutive season.

== Off Season ==
=== NFL draft ===
The 1938 NFL draft was held on December 12, 1937. The draft consisted of 12 rounds. The Eagles got the second pick in each round, as the expansion Cleveland Rams got the first pick. With the pick they chose Corbett Davis, a back from Indiana University.

=== Player selections ===
The table shows the Eagles' selections, what picks they had that were traded away, and the team that ended up with that pick. It is possible the Eagles' pick ended up with this team via another team that the Eagles made a trade with. Not shown are acquired picks that the Eagles traded away.

= Pro Bowler	= Hall of Famer

Rd	Pick #	Player	Position	College
1	2	Jim McDonald	Back	Ohio State
2	12	Dick Riffle	Back	Albright
3	17	Joe Bukant	Back	Washington (St. Louis)
4	27	John Meek	Back	California
5	32	Fred Shirey	Tackle	Nebraska
6	42	Herschel Ramsey	End	Texas Tech
7	52	Bob Lannon	End	Iowa
8	62	Clem Woltman	Guard	Purdue
9	72	Elmer Kolberg	Back	Oregon State
10	82	Emmett Kriel	Guard	Baylor
11	92	Carl Hinkle	Center	Vanderbilt
12	102	John Michelosen	Back	Pittsburgh

== Preseason ==
The Eagles opened preseason training camp on July 25, 1938 on the campus of West Chester State Teachers' College. On August 24, 1938, the Eagles defeated the Eastern College All-Stars 14 to 7 in front of 35,000 fans at Temple Stadium.

== Regular season ==
The Eagles faced the Pittsburgh Pirates on September 16, 1938 at Buffalo's Civic Stadium. The stadium had opened the previous year and 19,749 fans saw the Eagles defeat Pittsburgh which featured 1937 All-American and first round draft choice Byron White by the score of 27 to 7.

=== Schedule ===
Week	Date	Opponent	Result	Record	Attendance
1	September 11	**Washington Redskins**	**L** 23–26	0–1	20,000
2	September 16	at Pittsburgh Pirates	**W** 27–7	1–1	19,749
3	September 25	**New York Giants**	**W** 14–10	2–1	20,000
4	October 2	Chicago Bears	**L** 6–28	2–2	22,246
5	October 16	at **New York Giants**	**L** 7–17	2–3	33,187
6	October 23	at **Washington Redskins**	**L** 14–20	2–4	3,000
7	October 26	Chicago Cardinals	**W** 7–0	3–4	15,000
8	November 6	**Brooklyn Dodgers**	**L** 7–10	3–5	12,000
9	November 13	at **Brooklyn Dodgers**	**L** 14–32	3–6	13,052
10	November 20	**Pittsburgh Pirates**	**W** 14–7	4–6	6,500
11	December 4	at Detroit Lions	**W** 21–7	5–6	19,000

Note: Intra-division opponents are in bold text.

== Standings ==
NFL Eastern Division
	W	L	T	PCT	DIV	PF	PA	STK
New York Giants	8	2	1	.800	5–2–1	194	79	W1
Washington Redskins	6	3	2	.667	4–2–2	148	154	L1
Brooklyn Dodgers	4	4	3	.500	3–2–3	131	161	T1
Philadelphia Eagles	5	6	0	.455	3–5	154	164	W2
Pittsburgh Pirates	2	9	0	.182	2–6	79	169	L6

Note: Tie games were not officially counted in the standings until 1972.

== Playoffs ==
The Eagles had a 5–6–0 record and failed to make it to the 1938 NFL Championship Game. The game was on December 11, 1938, at Polo Grounds in New York City. The game attendance was 48,120, a record crowd for a title game.

The game matched the champions of the Eastern Division, New York Giants (8–2–1) against the Western Division champion Green Bay Packers (8–3–0). The Giants won 23–17.

== Roster ==
(All time List of Philadelphia Eagles players in franchise history)

= 1938 Pro All Star

As in the 1937 roster, this year's team is mostly rookies and players with one or two years' NFL experience.

NO.	Player	AGE	POS	GP	GS	WT	HT	YRS	College
	Bert Bell	42	Coach	_{1938 record} 5–6	_{NFL-Eagles Lifetime} 8–25			3rd	Pennsylvania
	Jay Arnold	26	HB-WB-DB-BB	11	11	210	6–1	1	Texas
	Joe Bukant	23	Back	11	1	216	6–0	Rookie	Washington (MO)
	Tom Burnette	23	BB	8	0	194	6–1	Rookie	North Carolina
	Joe Carter*	28	E	11	11	201	6–1	5	_{Austin College and SMU}
	John Cole	0	FB	11	0	197	5–9	Rookie	St. Joseph's (PA)
	Woody Dow	22	BB-FB	10	10	195	6–0	Rookie	West Texas A&M
	Drew Ellis	24	T	11	10	215	6–1	Rookie	TCU
	Fritz Ferko	26	T	2	0	242	6–1	1	_{Mount State Mary's and West Chester}
	Bill Fiedler	24	G	1	0	200	5–9	Rookie	Pennsylvania
	Wimpy Giddens	24	T	9	0	220	6–2	Rookie	Louisiana Tech
	Maurice Harper	28	Cen	11	9	227	6–4	1	Austin
	Bill Hewitt+	29	E-DE	11	11	190	5–9	6	Michigan
	Bill Hughes	23	G-C	11	6	226	6–1	1	Texas
	Ray Keeling	23	T-G	9	3	242	6–3	Rookie	Texas
	Rabbit Keen	24	QB	1	0	170	5–9	1	Arkansas
	John Kusko	24	B	1	0	194	5–11	2	Temple
	Bernie Lee	26	QB	1	0	190	5–11	Rookie	Villanova
	Bob Masters	27	HB	1	1	200	5–11	1	Baylor
	Emmett Mortell	22	B	11	7	181	6–1	1	_{Notre Dame and Wisconsin}
	Bob Pylman	25	T	11	1	214	6–4	Rookie	South Dakota State
	George Rado	26	G-DE	10	6	194	5–9	3	Duquesne
	Red Ramsey	27	E	11	0	196	6–0	Rookie	Texas Tech
	Hank Reese	29	C-G	11	2	214	5–11	5	Temple
	Dick Riffle	23	B	11	4	200	6–1	Rookie	Albright
	Theodore Schmitt	22	G	11	2	219	5–11	Rookie	Pittsburgh
	Dave Smukler	24	FB-LB	11	10	226	6–1	2	_{Missouri and Temple}
	Mule Stockton	25	G	11	8	214	6–1	1	McMurry
	Billy Wilson	27	E	1	0	184	5–10	3	Gonzaga
	Clem Woltman	24	T	10	8	214	6–1	Rookie	Purdue
	29 players Team average	24.1		11		206.4	6–0.1	1.2	

== Awards and honors ==
- Dave Smukler finished 2nd in TD passes with 7.
- Joe Carter finished 2nd in receiving TDs with 7.
- Dave Smukler returned the only kickoff for a TD this year in the NFL.
- Jay Arnold was one of 10 players to return an interception for a TD.
- Joe Carter was named to Pro All-Star team.
- Bill Hewitt was named to Pro All-Star team as a starter.
