= Art Lewis =

American football player and coach (1911–1962)

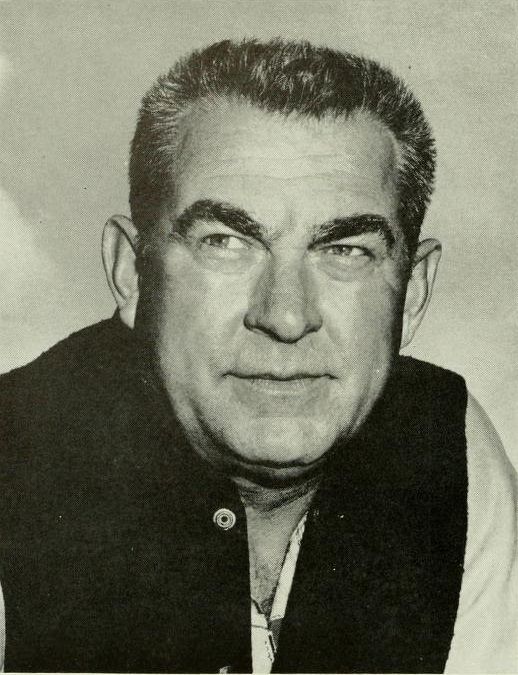
- Lewis pictured in The 1960 Monticola, West Virginia yearbook

No. 23, 11
- Positions: Tackle, Guard

Personal information
- Born: February 9, 1911; Pomeroy, Ohio, U.S.
- Died: June 13, 1962 (aged 51); Pittsburgh, Pennsylvania, U.S.
- Listed height: 6 ft 3 in (1.91 m)
- Listed weight: 226 lb (103 kg)

Career information
- High school: Middleport (Middleport, Ohio)
- College: Ohio (1932–1935)
- NFL draft: 1936: 1st round, 9th overall pick

Career history

Playing
- New York Giants (1936); Cleveland Rams (1938–1939)

Coaching
- Ohio Wesleyan (1937) Assistant coach; Cleveland Rams (1938) Interim head coach; Washington and Lee (1946–1948) Head coach; Mississippi State (1949) Line coach; West Virginia (1950–1959) Head coach

Awards and highlights
- As a player: First-team Little All-American (1935); As a coach: 5× SoCon champion (1953–1956, 1958)

Career NFL statistics
- Games played: 28
- Games started: 17
- Touchdowns: 1
- Stats at Pro Football Reference

Head coaching record
- Postseason: 0–1 (.000) (Bowl)
- Career: 69–55–2 (.556) (college); 4–4 (.500) (NFL)
- Coaching profile at Pro Football Reference

Arthur Everett "Pappy" Lewis (February 9, 1911 – June 13, 1962) was an American professional football player and coach. He played college football as a lineman at Ohio University from 1932 to 1935 and then in the National Football League (NFL) being a first-round draft choice by the New York Giants in 1936 and the Cleveland Rams from 1938 to 1939. Lewis also served as the interim head coach for the Rams for the last eight games of the 1938 season becoming the youngest head coach in NFL history. He was the head football coach at Washington and Lee University from 1946 to 1948 and at West Virginia University from 1950 to 1959, compiling a career college football record of 69–55–2. At West Virginia, Lewis led the Mountaineers to five Southern Conference titles and an appearance in the 1954 Sugar Bowl.

== Early life and college career ==
Born February 18, 1911, in Pomeroy, Ohio, Lewis was a standout tackle at Middleport High School in Middleport, Ohio. At the age of 21, he enrolled at Ohio University, where he played tackle from 1932 to 1935 and earned All-American honors his senior year. He capped off his college football career appearing in the 1935 East-West Shrine Game. It was in college that he got his nickname "Pappy".

== Professional career ==
Lewis was drafted by the New York Giants in the first round (ninth overall) of the 1936 NFL draft. After playing one year, Lewis left to coach at Ohio Wesleyan University but left a year later to join the Cleveland Rams as an assistant coach/player. He became the interim head coach mid season. This made him the youngest head coach in NFL history at the age of 27. He coached the team to a 4–4 record and stayed with the team as a player for the 1939 season.

== Collegiate coaching ==
After serving in the United States Navy during World War II, Lewis became the head coach of Washington and Lee University. Here he found his talent as a recruiter but his overall record was 11–17. He coached one year as an assistant at Mississippi State University and then was appointed the head coach at West Virginia University. His first couple seasons were rather lackluster but the team turned around during the 1952 season going 7–2 and finishing second in conference play The 1953 season was his greatest season at West Virginia. The team went 8–1 in the regular season, captured the Southern Conference title and started a three-year winning streak against arch-rival Penn State. The tenth ranked Mountaineers then journeyed to the Sugar Bowl to face eighth ranked Georgia Tech where they lost 42–19. Under Lewis, the Mountaineers continued to dominate the Southern Conference winning the conference title four more times. Much of his success as a coach was credited to his recruiting abilities. He was able to attract such players as Sam Huff, Chuck Howley, Joe Marconi and others. The 1958 and 1959 seasons saw a major drop off and Lewis resigned as head coach.

== Later life ==
After leaving West Virginia, Lewis accepted a position with the Pittsburgh Steelers as a talent scout and stayed with them until his death. Lewis died of a heart attack on June 13, 1962, at the age of 51. He is considered one of the greatest coaches in West Virginia history and was inducted into the West Virginia Sports Hall of Fame in 1966. He has ten great-grandchildren, Caroline, Grace, and young Michael, Drew, Taylor, Sydney, Rissa, Molly, Casey and Tessa.

== Head coaching record ==
=== NFL ===
Team	Year	Regular season					Postseason			
Team	Year	Won	Lost	Ties	Win %	Finish	Won	Lost	Win %	Result
CLE	1938	4	4	0	.500	4th in NFL Western	–	–	–	–
CLE Total		4	4	0	.500		–	–	–	–
NFL Total		4	4	0	.500		–	–	–	–
Total		4	4	0	.500		–	–	–	–

=== College ===
Year	Team	Overall	Conference	Standing	Bowl/playoffs	Coaches^{#}	AP^{°}
Washington and Lee Generals (Southern Conference) (1946–1948)
1946	Washington and Lee	2–6	1–4	T–13th			
1947	Washington and Lee	5–5	3–2	5th			
1948	Washington and Lee	4–6	2–2	T–8th			
Washington and Lee:		11–17	6–8				
West Virginia Mountaineers (Southern Conference) (1950–1959)
1950	West Virginia	2–8	1–3	14th			
1951	West Virginia	5–5	2–3	9th			
1952	West Virginia	7–2	5–1	2nd			
1953	West Virginia	8–2	4–0	1st	L Sugar	13	10
1954	West Virginia	8–1	3–0	1st			12
1955	West Virginia	8–2	4–0	1st		17	19
1956	West Virginia	6–4	5–0	1st			
1957	West Virginia	7–2–1	3–0	2nd			
1958	West Virginia	4–5–1	4–0	1st			
1959	West Virginia	3–7	2–2	6th			
West Virginia:		58–38–2	33–9				
Total:		69–55–2					
National championship Conference title Conference division title or championship game berth
^{#}Rankings from final Coaches Poll.; ^{°}Rankings from final AP Poll.
