= 1938 Washington Redskins season =

NFL team season

- Owner: George Preston Marshall
- General manager: Jack Espey
- Head coach: Ray Flaherty
- Home stadium: Griffith Stadium

Results
- Record: 6–3–2
- Division place: 2nd NFL Eastern
- Playoffs: Did not qualify

The 1938 Washington Redskins season was the franchise's 7th season in the National Football League (NFL) and their 2nd in Washington, D.C. The team began trying to defend their championship and improve on their 8–3 record from 1937, but failed and missed the playoffs and finished 6–3–2.

== Draft ==
1938 Washington Redskins draft
Round	Pick	Player	Position	College	Notes
1	9	Andy Farkas *	Back	Detroit	
3	24	Sam Chapman	Back	California	
5	39	Dave Price	Center	Mississippi State	
6	49	Elmer Dohrmann	End	Nebraska	
7	59	Roy Young	Guard	Texas A&M	
8	69	Bill Hartman	Fullback	Georgia	
9	79	Ed Parks	Center	Oklahoma	
10	89	Jack Abbott	Back	Elon	
11	99	Dick Johnston	End	Washington	
12	109	Hank Bartos	Guard	North Carolina	
Made roster † Pro Football Hall of Fame * Made at least one Pro Bowl during career

== Schedule ==
Game	Date	Opponent	Result	Record	Venue	Attendance	Recap	Sources
1	September 11	at **Philadelphia Eagles**	**W** 26–23	1–0	Philadelphia Municipal Stadium	20,000	Recap	
2	September 18	**Brooklyn Dodgers**	**T** 16–16	1–0–1	Griffith Stadium	23,000	Recap	
3	September 25	Cleveland Rams	**W** 37–13	2–0–1	Griffith Stadium	27,000	Recap	
4	October 9	**New York Giants**	**L** 7–10	2–1–1	Griffith Stadium	37,500	Recap	
5	October 16	at Detroit Lions	**W** 7–5	3–1–1	Briggs Stadium	42,855	Recap	
6	October 23	**Philadelphia Eagles**	**W** 20–14	4–1–1	Griffith Stadium	3,000	Recap	
7	October 30	at **Brooklyn Dodgers**	**T** 6–6	4–1–2	Ebbets Field	29,913	Recap	
8	November 6	at **Pittsburgh Pirates**	**W** 7–0	5–1–2	Forbes Field	12,910	Recap	
9	November 13	at Chicago Bears	**L** 7–31	5–2–2	Wrigley Field	21,817	Recap	
10	November 27	**Pittsburgh Pirates**	**W** 15–0	6–2–2	Griffith Stadium	12,910	Recap	
11	December 4	at **New York Giants**	**L** 0–36	6–3–2	Polo Grounds	57,461	Recap	
—	January 16, 1938	at Pacific Coast All-Stars	**L** 0–36	—	Kezar Stadium	5,000	—	
Note: Intra-division opponents are in **bold** text.

== Roster ==
1938 Washington Redskins final roster
Backs: 33 Sammy Baugh RB/CB; 44 Andy Farkas FB/LB; 30 Frank Filchock RB/CB; 34 Bill Hartman RB/CB; 23 Don Irwin RB/CB; 13 Ed Justice RB/CB; 20 George Karamatic RB/CB/K; 25 Max Krause FB/LB; 14 Tillie Manton RB/S/K; 11 Erny Pinckert RB/CB; 35 Riley Smith RB/S/K; 24 Jay Turner RB/CB/S	Linemen/Linebackers: 15 Jim Barber T/DT; 22 Chuck Bond T/DT; 26 Vic Carroll C/LB; 17 Turk Edwards T/DT; 18 Bud Ericksen C/LB; 29 Jim Karcher G/DG; 41 Henry Krause C/LB; 21 Les Olsson G/DG; 27 Mickey Parks C/LB; 39 Clem Stralka G/DG; 36 Willie Wilkin T/DT; 37 Bill Young G/DG; 46 Roy Young G/DG	Ends/Receivers: 38 Hal Bradley; 19 Charley Malone; 28 Bob Masterson; 32 Bob McChesney; 40 Wayne Millner; Reserve: Frank Walton G/DG (inactive); rookies in italics

== Standings ==
NFL Eastern Division
	W	L	T	PCT	DIV	PF	PA	STK
New York Giants	8	2	1	.800	5–2–1	194	79	W1
Washington Redskins	6	3	2	.667	4–2–2	148	154	L1
Brooklyn Dodgers	4	4	3	.500	3–2–3	131	161	T1
Philadelphia Eagles	5	6	0	.455	3–5	154	164	W2
Pittsburgh Pirates	2	9	0	.182	2–6	79	169	L6

Note: Tie games were not officially counted in the standings until 1972.
