= Hank Bartos =

American football player (1913–1987)

No. 18
- Position: Guard

Personal information
- Born: May 20, 1913; Brooklyn, New York, U.S.
- Died: December 28, 1987 (aged 74)
- Listed height: 6 ft 1 in (1.85 m)
- Listed weight: 220 lb (100 kg)

Career information
- College: North Carolina
- NFL draft: 1938: 12th round, 109th overall pick

Career history
- Washington Redskins (1938)

Career NFL statistics
- Games played: 7
- Stats at Pro Football Reference

Henry Bartos (May 20, 1913 – December 28, 1987) was an American professional football guard in the National Football League (NFL) for the Washington Redskins. He played college football at the University of North Carolina and was drafted in the twelfth round of the 1938 NFL draft. Bartos coached the line at the University of South Carolina under three different head coaches from 1946 to 1964.
