= Charles Ream =

American football player (1913–2010)

- Ream, circa 1936

No. 39
- Position: Tackle

Personal information
- Born: December 12, 1913; Youngstown, Ohio, U.S.
- Died: August 21, 2010 (aged 96); Bexley, Ohio, U.S.
- Listed height: 6 ft 2 in (1.88 m)
- Listed weight: 225 lb (102 kg)

Career information
- High school: Navarre (Navarre, Ohio)
- College: Ohio State
- NFL draft: 1938: 9th round, 71st overall pick

Career history
- Cleveland Rams (1938)
- Stats at Pro Football Reference

Charles Daniel Ream (December 12, 1913 – August 21, 2010) was an American professional football tackle who played for the Cleveland Rams of the National Football League (NFL). He played college football for the Ohio State Buckeyes and was selected by the Rams in the ninth round of the 1938 NFL draft.

== Early life ==
Charles Daniel Ream was born on December 12, 1913, in Youngstown, Ohio. He attended Navarre High School in Navarre, Ohio.

== College career ==
Ream enrolled at Ohio State University to play college football for the Buckeyes. He was on the freshmen team in 1934 and was a three-year varsity letterman from 1935 to 1937. Before the start of the 1937 season, he was moved from tackle to end. Ream earned United Press honorable mention All-Big Ten Conference honors at end in 1937.

== Professional career ==
Ream was selected by the Cleveland Rams in the ninth round, with the 71st overall pick, of the 1938 NFL draft. He signed with the team on January 21, 1938. He played in ten games, starting three, for the Rams during the 1938 season as a tackle.

== Personal life ==
Ream was an assistant football coach at Hobart College from 1939 to 1941. He was a lieutenant in the United States Navy in the South Pacific during World War II. He was a buyer for F&R Lazarus for 30 years until retiring. Ream died on August 21, 2010, in Bexley, Ohio.
