= Frank Butler (American football) =

American football player (1909–1979)

No. 26, 35
- Positions: Center, tackle

Personal information
- Born: May 3, 1909; Bloomington, Illinois, U.S.
- Died: October 30, 1979 (aged 70); Cook County, Illinois, U.S.

Career information
- High school: Tilden (Chicago, Illinois)
- College: Michigan State

Career history
- Green Bay Packers (1934–1936, 1938)

Awards and highlights
- NFL champion (1936)

Career statistics
- Games played: 26
- Games started: 11
- Stats at Pro Football Reference

Frank John Butler (May 3, 1909 – October 30, 1979) was an American professional football player who was a center and tackle for four seasons in the National Football League (NFL) with the Green Bay Packers. He was a member of the Packers' 1936 NFL Championship team. Prior to his professional football career, Butler played college football for the Michigan State Spartans.

== Early life and college ==
Frank Butler was born May 3, 1909, in Bloomington, Illinois. He graduated from Tilden High School in Chicago before attending the University of Notre Dame and Michigan State University. During his time at Michigan State, he played for the football team.

== Career ==
Butler joined the Green Bay Packers prior to the 1934 NFL season as a center, with the Green Bay Press-Gazette noting his large size at six feet, two inches tall and 224 pounds. In his first season with the Packers, he played the first four games of the year. However, he informed head coach Curly Lambeau that he had to resign his spot on the team after he accepted a government job as an inspector surveying and researching harbors. Lambeau refused Butler's offer to just play with the team on Sundays, asserting his desire for players to participate in practices during the week. Butler signed with the Packers again prior to the 1935 NFL season after securing a leave of absence from his government job. During the 1935 season, Butler suffered a severe shoulder injury. He would continue playing for the Packers in the 1936 and 1938 NFL seasons, although he missed all of 1937. Butler was on the 1936 team that beat the Boston Redskins in the NFL Championship game. In total, he played in 26 games for the Packers, 11 of those as a starter.

== Personal life ==
Butler married his wife, Rita, on June 27, 1936, in Chicago. The marriage produced seven children. Butler died on October 30, 1979, at the age of 70.
