= 1938 Chicago Cardinals season =

American football team season

- Head coach: Milan Creighton
- Home stadium: Wrigley Field

Results
- Record: 2–9
- Division place: 5th NFL Western
- Playoffs: Did not qualify

The 1938 Chicago Cardinals season was their 19th in the league. The team failed to improve on their previous output of 5–5–1, winning only two games. They played seven of their eleven games on the road and failed to qualify for the playoffs for the 13th consecutive season. This would be the last team to allow 10 points or less in 3 consecutive games and lose them all until the 2023 New England Patriots team.

== Schedule ==
Week	Date	Opponent	Result	Record	Venue
1	September 11	at Chicago Bears	L 13–16	0–1	Soldier Field
2	September 17	at Cleveland Rams	W 7–6	1–1	Shaw Stadium
3	September 25	at Green Bay Packers	L 7–28	1–2	Wisconsin State Fair Park
3	September 28	Green Bay Packers	L 22–24	1–3	Civic Stadium
4	October 2	at Brooklyn Dodgers	L 0–13	1–4	Ebbets Field
5	Bye				
6	October 16	Chicago Bears	L 28–34	1–5	Wrigley Field
7	October 23	at Detroit Lions	L 0–10	1–6	Briggs Stadium
7	October 26	at Philadelphia Eagles	L 0–7	1–7	Erie Stadium
9	November 6	at New York Giants	L 0–6	1–8	Polo Grounds
10	Bye				
11	November 20	Detroit Lions	L 3–7	1–9	Comiskey Park
12	November 27	Cleveland Rams	W 31–17	2–9	Comiskey Park

== Standings ==
NFL Western Division
	W	L	T	PCT	DIV	PF	PA	STK
Green Bay Packers	8	3	0	.727	6–2	223	118	L1
Detroit Lions	7	4	0	.636	6–2	119	108	L1
Chicago Bears	6	5	0	.545	3–5	194	148	L1
Cleveland Rams	4	7	0	.364	3–5	131	215	W1
Chicago Cardinals	2	9	0	.182	2–6	111	168	W1

Note: Tie games were not officially counted in the standings until 1972.
