= John Howell (halfback) =

American football player (1915–1946)

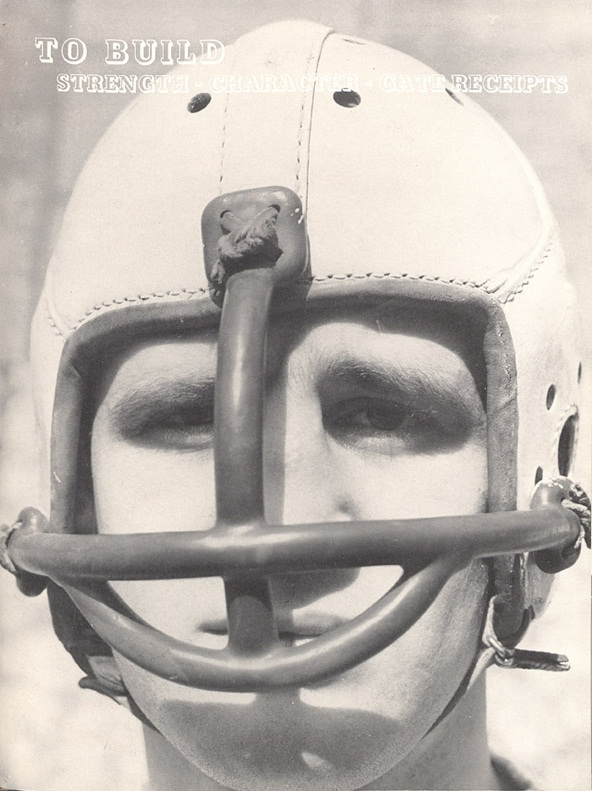
- Howell, 1937, Nebraska quarterback

No. 49
- Position: Halfback

Personal information
- Born: December 4, 1915; Omaha, Nebraska, U.S.
- Died: June 28, 1946 (aged 30); Scottsbluff, Nebraska, U.S.
- Listed height: 5 ft 10 in (1.78 m)
- Listed weight: 185 lb (84 kg)

Career information
- High school: Central (Omaha)
- College: Nebraska (1934-1937)
- NFL draft: 1938: 9th round, 77th overall pick

Career history
- Green Bay Packers (1938)

Awards and highlights
- First-team All-Big Six (1937)

Career NFL statistics
- Rushing yards: 7
- Rushing average: 1
- Stats at Pro Football Reference

John Searl Howell (December 4, 1915 – June 28, 1946) was a halfback in the National Football League (NFL).

== Biography ==
Howell was born on December 4, 1915, in Omaha, Nebraska. He was struck and killed by lightning on June 28, 1946, in Scottsbluff, Nebraska.

== Career ==
Howell was drafted by the Green Bay Packers in the ninth round of the 1938 NFL draft and played that season with the team. He played at the collegiate level at the University of Nebraska.
