= Paul Szakash =

American football player (1913–1984)

No. 8, 84, 22
- Positions: End, Fullback

Personal information
- Born: May 5, 1913; Chicago, Illinois, U.S.
- Died: October 24, 1984 (aged 71); Missoula, Montana, U.S.
- Listed height: 6 ft 0 in (1.83 m)
- Listed weight: 213 lb (97 kg)

Career information
- High school: Fenger (Chicago)
- College: Montana (1934-1937)
- NFL draft: 1938: 7th round, 56th overall pick

Career history

Playing
- Detroit Lions (1938–1942)

Coaching
- Montana (1946–1950) Line coach

Career NFL statistics
- Rushing yards: 66
- Rushing average: 2.9
- Receptions: 9
- Receiving yards: 130
- Stats at Pro Football Reference

Paul Michael "Socko" Szakash (May 5, 1913 – October 24, 1984) was an American professional football player.

Szakash was born in Chicago in 1913. He attended Fenger High School in Chicago. He played football at Fenger in 1929 and 1930 and then for the Gano Athletic Club from 1934 to 1937.

He next attended the University of Montana and played college football as a fullback and place-kicker for the Montana Grizzlies football team. After playing every minute of every game in 1935, he missed the 1936 season after sustaining a ruptured appendix. During his recovery, he helped coach the freshmen. He returned to the team as a player in 1937.

He was selected in the seventh round by the Detroit Lions with the 56th pick in the 1938 NFL draft. During his first training camp with the Lions, the Detroit Free Press reported that he "showed more drive in plunging than any other young man who ever came to the Detroit camp." He played four seasons with the Lions, appearing in 38 games, 13 as a starter, from 1938 to 1939 and 1941 to 1942. He played at the end and fullback positions. He carried the ball 23 times for 66 yards and caught nine passes for 130 yards.

Szakash also played baseball as a catcher for the Missoula club for several years. He missed the 1940 NFL season with a fractured ankle sustained while playing baseball in Montana.

In March 1945, Szakash enlisted in the United States Marine Corps. He fought at the Battle of Iwo Jima. He also saw action at the Battle of Okinawa.

Szakash served as the line coach at the University of Montana from 1946 to 1950.

Szakash later operated a frozen food business. He died in 1984 at Missoula, Montana.
