= 1938 Chicago Bears season =

NFL team season

- Head coach: George Halas
- Home stadium: Wrigley Field

Results
- Record: 6–5
- Division place: 3rd NFL Western
- Playoffs: Did not qualify

The 1938 Chicago Bears season was their 19th regular season completed in the National Football League. They finished third in the Western Division and did not make the championship game. The Bears started the season well, winning 4 of their first 5 games. However, two upset losses to the Cleveland Rams, two losses to the Detroit Lions, and a loss to Green Bay prevented the Bears from competing in the West.

== Season highlights ==
The Bears could not repeat their success of 1937. Although their attack was basically the same, except at running back. Bronko Nagurski and Keith Molesworth retired and the rushing attack was not as effective. Joe Maniaci, a back acquired from Brooklyn, joined the team and led the squad in rushing with 345 yards but his low 3.6 average yards per carry was emblematic of the Bears problems running the ball. Bill Karr again led the team in receiving, catching 14 passes for 253 yards and 4 touchdowns. Les McDonald played well at end and second year end Dick Plasman also contributed. The Bears "vertical" passing attack, led again by Bernie Masterson and Ray Buivid, had a league best 17.0 yards per reception, but the club's quarterbacks only had a 36.5 completion percentage. The Bear defense did not play as well as in 1937 either, giving up 14 or more points five times, or the same number of times as in the past two season combined. The biggest disappointment, overall, were the two losses to Cleveland. Cleveland only won 4 games all year, two against the Bears, and had the worst defense in the league, allowing 215 points for the year. In the first Cleveland game, the Bears were totally outplayed, falling behind 14–0 and failing to mount a serious comeback. The second loss was a back and forth affair, with the lead changing hands 7 times. The Bears gave up a 21–16 fourth quarter lead, losing 23–21 at home. As the only team in the league running the T-formation, it is no surprise the other teams kept using the Single Wing and its variants. Lacking a complete T-formation quarterback, the Bears offense was inconsistent and, at times, quite unimpressive.

== Schedule ==
Game	Date	Opponent	Result	Record	Venue	Attendance	Recap	Sources
1	September 11	**Chicago Cardinals**	**W** 16–13	1–0	Soldier Field	20,000	Recap	
2	September 18	at **Green Bay Packers**	**W** 2–0	2–0	City Stadium	15,172	Recap	
—	September 23	Colored All-Stars	**W** 51–0	—	Soldier Field	6,000	—	
3	October 2	at Philadelphia Eagles	**W** 28–6	3–0	Municipal Stadium	22,246	Recap	
4	October 9	at **Cleveland Rams**	**L** 7–14	3–1	Shaw Stadium	8,000	Recap	
5	October 16	at **Chicago Cardinals**	**W** 34–28	4–1	Wrigley Field	21,614	Recap	
6	October 23	**Cleveland Rams**	**L** 21–23	4–2	Wrigley Field	18,705	Recap	
7	October 30	**Detroit Lions**	**L** 7–13	4–3	Wrigley Field	24,346	Recap	
8	November 6	at **Green Bay Packers**	**L** 17–24	4–4	City Stadium	40,208	Recap	
9	November 13	Washington Redskins	**W** 31–7	5–4	Wrigley Field	21,817	Recap	
10	November 20	at Brooklyn Dodgers	**W** 24–6	6–4	Ebbets Field	26,416	Recap	
11	November 24	at **Detroit Lions**	**L** 7–14	6–5	Briggs Stadium	26,287	Recap	
Note: Intra-division opponents are in **bold** text. Non-league game in italics.

== Standings ==
NFL Western Division
	W	L	T	PCT	DIV	PF	PA	STK
Green Bay Packers	8	3	0	.727	6–2	223	118	L1
Detroit Lions	7	4	0	.636	6–2	119	108	L1
Chicago Bears	6	5	0	.545	3–5	194	148	L1
Cleveland Rams	4	7	0	.364	3–5	131	215	W1
Chicago Cardinals	2	9	0	.182	2–6	111	168	W1

Note: Tie games were not officially counted in the standings until 1972.

== Roster ==
1938 Chicago Bears final roster
Quarterbacks: 9 Ray Buivid RB/CB/S; 5 George Corbett S; 33 Bernie Masterson S; 6 Gene Ronzani S; Ends/Receivers: 22 Bill Karr; 76 Les McDonald; 14 Dick Plasman; 30 George Wilson	Linemen/Linebackers: 35 Dick Bassi G/DG; 24 Frank Bausch C/LB; 82 Del Bjork T/DT; 47 Red Conkright C/LB; 21 Dan Fortmann G/DG; 16 George Musso G/DG; 13 Joe Stydahar T/DT; 12 Frank Sullivan C/LB; 29 Russ Thompson T/DT; 27 Milt Trost T/DT; 28 Gust Zarnas G/DG; 17 Joe Zeller G/DG	Backs: 2 Gary Famiglietti FB/LB; 38 Sam Francis FB/LB; 3 Bert Johnson FB/LB/P; 10 Jack Manders RB/CB/K; 11 Joe Maniaci RB/CB/K; 25 Ray Nolting RB/CB; 31 Dick Schweidler RB/S; 48 Bob Swisher RB/CB; Rookies in italics

=== Future Hall of Fame players ===
- Dan Fortmann, guard
- George Musso, guard
- Joe Stydahar, tackle

=== Players departed from 1937 ===
- Keith Molesworth, halfback (retired)
- Bronko Nagurski, fullback (retired)
