= Ray Keeling =

American football player (1915–1996)

No. 28
- Positions: Offensive guard, offensive tackle

Personal information
- Born: August 24, 1915; Dallas, Texas
- Died: April 1, 1996 (aged 80); Littlefield, Texas
- Listed height: 6 ft 3 in (1.91 m)
- Listed weight: 242 lb (110 kg)

Career information
- College: Texas

Career history
- Philadelphia Eagles (1938-1939)

Career statistics
- Games Played: 18
- Games Started: 3
- Stats at Pro Football Reference

Raymond Grigsby Keeling (August 24, 1915 - April 1, 1996) was an American football offensive guard and tackle who played two seasons for the Philadelphia Eagles of the NFL. He played nine games in both years.
