= Paul McDonough (American football) =

American football player (1916–1960)

No. 21, 19
- Position: End

Personal information
- Born: December 14, 1916; Salt Lake City, Utah, U.S.
- Died: August 11, 1960 (aged 43); Salt Lake City, Utah, U.S.
- Listed height: 6 ft 4 in (1.93 m)
- Listed weight: 222 lb (101 kg)

Career information
- High school: East (Salt Lake City)
- College: Utah
- NFL draft: 1938: 9th round, 74th overall pick

Career history
- Pittsburgh Pirates (1938); Cleveland Rams (1939–1941)

Career NFL statistics
- Receptions: 40
- Receiving yards: 672
- Touchdowns: 4
- Stats at Pro Football Reference

Paul Roy McDonough (December 14, 1916 – August 11, 1960) was an American professional football player who was an end for four seasons for the Pittsburgh Pirates and the Cleveland Rams. He was selected in the ninth round of the 1938 NFL draft.
