= Carl Mulleneaux =

American football player (1914–1995)

No. 19, 7
- Position: End

Personal information
- Born: September 16, 1914; Phoenix, Arizona, U.S.
- Died: January 23, 1995 (aged 80); Chico, California, U.S.
- Listed height: 6 ft 3 in (1.91 m)
- Listed weight: 209 lb (95 kg)

Career information
- High school: Phoenix Union
- College: Utah State (1933-1936)
- NFL draft: 1938: undrafted

Career history

Playing
- Green Bay Packers (1938–1941); Great Lakes Navy (1942); Bainbridge (c. 1943); Los Angeles Bulldogs (1945); Green Bay Packers (1945–1946)

Coaching
- Football: Great Lakes Navy (1942) Ends coach; Bainbridge (c. 1943) Assistant coach; Saint Louis (1947) Ends coach; Arizona (1948–1949) Line coach; Texas Tech (1950) Line coach; Fullerton (1953) Ends coach; Santa Monica (1954–?) Backfield coach; Golf: Santa Monica (1954–?) Head coach

Awards and highlights
- NFL champion (1939); 2× Pro Bowl (1939, 1940); Green Bay Packers Hall of Fame (1983)

Career NFL statistics
- Receptions: 44
- Receiving yards: 850
- Receiving touchdowns: 11
- Stats at Pro Football Reference

Carl Kenneth "Moose" Mulleneaux (September 16, 1914 – January 23, 1995) was an American professional football player and coach. He played professionally as an end in the National Football League (NFL) for six seasons with the Green Bay Packers, from 1938 to 1941 and 1945 to 1946). He was inducted into the Green Bay Packers Hall of Fame in 1983. Mulleneaux's brother Lee Mulleneaux also played briefly for the Packers.

After retiring from the Packers in 1946 due to injuries, in particular a vicious hit delivered by John Schiechl during a punt return, Mulleneaux coached football at Saint Louis University, Texas Tech University, the University of Arizona, Fullerton College, and Santa Monica College. Mulleneaux was part of the coaching staff that took the 1958 Santa Monica Corsairs football team to an undefeated season and a victory in the Junior Rose Bowl. Mulleneaux also served as the golf coach at Santa Monica College for many years.

After retiring from coaching, Mulleneaux returned to the Phoenix, Arizona area and was active in National Football League Alumni charity functions.
