= Alex Wojciechowicz =

American football player (1915–1992)

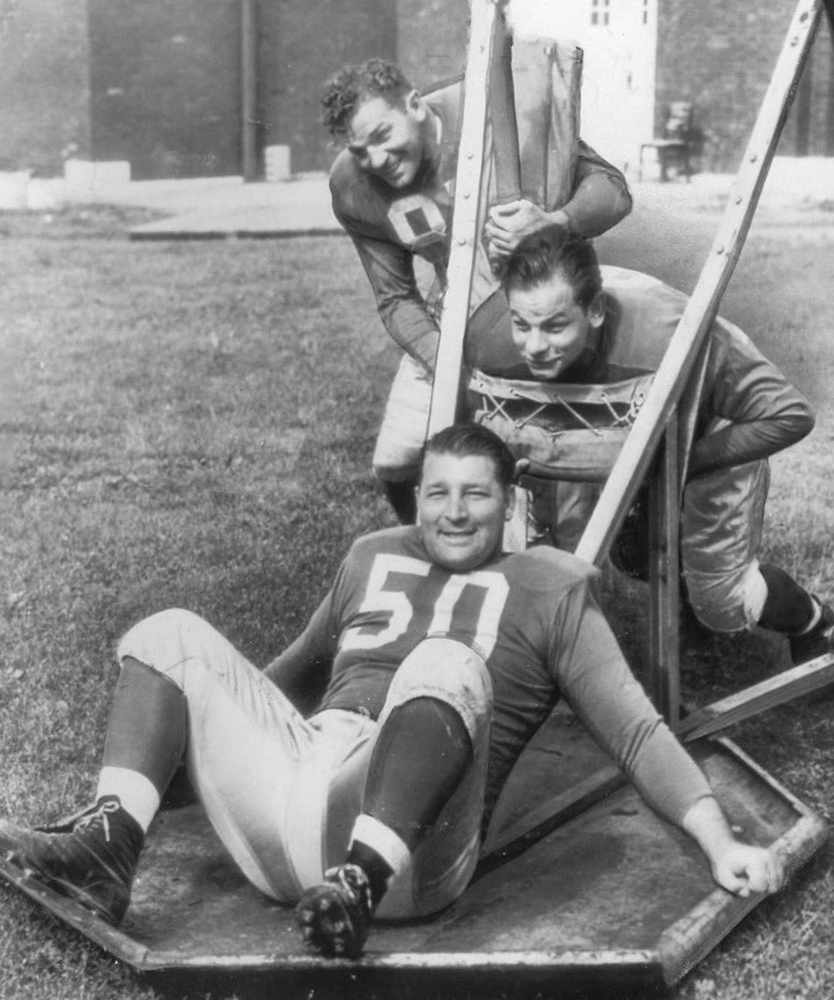
- Wojciechowicz (bottom) in 1946

No. 30, 50, 53
- Positions: Center, linebacker, end

Personal information
- Born: August 12, 1915; South River, New Jersey, U.S.
- Died: July 13, 1992 (aged 76); Forked River, New Jersey, U.S.
- Listed height: 5 ft 11 in (1.80 m)
- Listed weight: 217 lb (98 kg)

Career information
- High school: South River
- College: Fordham (1935–1937)
- NFL draft: 1938: 1st round, 6th overall pick

Career history

Playing
- Detroit Lions (1938–1946); Philadelphia Eagles (1946-1950)

Coaching
- Newark Bears (1963) Assistant coach; Newark Bears (1964) Head defensive / defensive line coach; Newark Bears (1965) Assistant coach

Awards and highlights
- 2× NFL champion (1948, 1949); 2× First-team All-Pro (1939, 1944); NFL 1940s All-Decade Team; Pride of the Lions; Detroit Lions 75th Anniversary Team; Detroit Lions All-Time Team; Philadelphia Eagles Hall of Fame; Philadelphia Eagles 75th Anniversary Team; Order of the Leather Helmet (1982); 2× Consensus All-American (1936, 1937); First-team All-Eastern (1937)

Career NFL statistics
- Games played: 134
- Games started: 77
- Interceptions: 19
- Interception yards: 162
- Fumble recoveries: 7
- Defensive touchdowns: 1
- Stats at Pro Football Reference
- Pro Football Hall of Fame
- College Football Hall of Fame

Alexander Francis "Wojie" Wojciechowicz (Note: In English /woʊdʒɪˈhoʊwɪts/ woh-jih-HOH-wits, in Polish [vɔjt͡ɕɛˈxɔvit͡ʂ].) (August 12, 1915 – July 13, 1992) was an American professional football player in the National Football League (NFL) from 1935 to 1950. He was a two-way player who played at center on offense and at linebacker on defense. He has been inducted into both the College and Pro Football Hall of Fame, was a founder and the first president of the NFL Alumni Association, and was the third player to receive the Order of the Leather Helmet.

Wojciechowicz played college football for the Fordham Rams from 1935 to 1937 and was a member of the line that became known as the "Seven Blocks of Granite". He was selected as the consensus first-team All-American center in both 1936 and 1937.

Wojciechowicz was selected by the Detroit Lions in the first round of the 1938 NFL draft and played for the Lions from 1938 to 1946. He was selected as a first-team All-NFL player in 1939 and 1944. In 1946, he was released by the Lions and then sold to the Philadelphia Eagles, for whom he played from 1946 to 1950. He won two NFL championships with the Eagles, in 1948 and 1949.

== Early life ==
Wojciechowicz was born in 1915 in South River, New Jersey. His father, Andrew Wojciechowicz (1890–1974), was a Polish immigrant and tailor.

According to Wojciechowicz, he began playing organized football in 1929 as a freshman at South River High School — beginning as a center and never moving away from the position over the subsequent two decades.

Wojciechowicz recalled that his real love as a boy was baseball, playing catcher and batting cleanup for his successful high school squad. However Wojciechowicz sought a college education and saw football as his natural path to academic possibilities and he consequently shifted his focus to the fall sport. He was torn between Villanova, Dartmouth, and Fordham, ultimately choosing the latter due to its location in New York City and Catholic orientation.

== College career ==
Wojciechowicz enrolled at Fordham in 1935 and played college football as the center for the Fordham Rams football team from 1935 to 1937. He was a member of the Fordham line, alongside guard Vince Lombardi, that became known as the "Seven Blocks of Granite". The undefeated 1937 Fordham team, with Wojciechowicz at center, compiled a 7–0–1 record, was ranked #3 in the final AP Poll, and gave up only 16 points all season. He was selected as the consensus first-team All-American center in both 1936 and 1937.

Fordham coach Jim Crowley called Wojciechowicz "one of the great defensive centers" and noted that he "seldom made a bad pass from center." He made a name for himself in the annual rivalry games with the Pittsburgh Panthers, resulting in three consecutive scoreless ties. The final tie was the only blemish on the record of the 1937 Pittsburgh team that won the national championship in the AP Poll. Wojciechowicz later cited the Pittsburgh games as his three biggest thrills in football, saying, "Pitt had the dream backfield, with all-America Marshall Goldberg, and we had the dream line. It was a stalemate for three years. Those three games proved what football is all about."

== Professional career ==
=== Detroit Lions ===
Wojciechowicz was selected by the Detroit Lions in the first round, sixth overall pick, of the 1938 NFL draft. He signed with the Lions in July 1938. For nine years, Wojciechowicz was a fixture in the Lions' lineup, a 60-minute player who played at center on offense and linebacker on defense. He was selected as a first-team All-NFL player in 1939 and 1944 and had seven interceptions in 1944, a Lions single-season record at the time. Between 1938 and 1946, he appeared in 86 games for the Lions, 61 of them as a starter. The Pro Football Hall of Fame, in its biography of Wojciechowicz, states: "On the field, ... he was all business, one of the last of the 'iron men' of football, a center on offense and a sure-tackling linebacker with unusually good range, on defense." In October 1946, after the Lions lost their season opener, Detroit coach Gus Dorais released four linemen, including Wojciechowicz. Wojciechowicz announced at the time that he would return to his business in New Jersey and added, "This day had to come, and I can't say I'm disappointed that it happened now."

=== Philadelphia Eagles ===
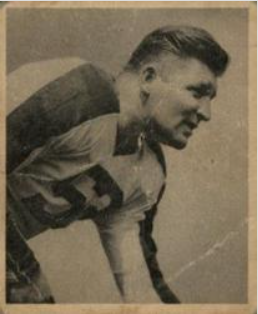
1948 Bowman card of Wojciechowicz for Philadelphia Eagles

Two days after the Lions announced his release, the Eagles purchased the Lions' rights to Wojciechowicz for an undisclosed sum. He appeared in seven games for the Eagles, only one as a starter, during the 1946 season.

In 1947, he became the Eagles' starting center, appearing in all 12 games for the club, 11 as a starter. The 1947 Eagles compiled an 8–4 record, finished in first place in the NFL East, but lost to the Cardinals in the 1947 NFL Championship Game.

In 1948, Wojciechowicz lost the starting center job to Vic Lindskog, but appeared in 10 games, mostly on defense, for the 1948 Eagles team that shut out the Cardinals in the 1948 NFL Championship Game. In 1949, he appeared in all 12 games, but only one as a starter, as Chuck Bednarik was the starting center for the 1949 Eagles team. That year, the Eagles won their second consecutive NFL championship, shutting out the Rams in the 1949 NFL Championship Game.

He was considered past his prime when he joined the Eagles, but head coach Greasy Neale used him principally as a linebacker, and he responded with quality defensive play. Teammate Jack Hinkle called Wojciechowicz the "toughest guy" on the Eagles' championship teams and added, "He looked like a big, shaggy dog. A sad-eyed St. Bernard. But he'd rip your head off."

In his final NFL season, Wojciechowicz appeared in nine games, none as a starter, and saw only limited action. In December 1950, he announced that he was retiring as a player.

== Family and later years ==
Wojciechowicz was married to Katherine Mallen, and they had three sons and a daughter.

For many years after retiring from the NFL, Wojciechowicz lived in Wanamassa, New Jersey, and worked as a real estate appraiser and broker.

Wojciechowicz was also one of the founders of the NFL Alumni Association, established to negotiate with the owners for the creation of a pension plan to benefit the game's early players, and was elected as its president in 1968. His son recalled: "He worked hard to establish the indigent players' fund and establish pensions."

Wojciechowicz died in 1992 at his home in Forked River, New Jersey at age 76.

== Honors ==
After retiring from football, Wojciechowicz received numerous honors including the following:

- In 1955, he was inducted to the College Football Hall of Fame.
- In 1968, he was inducted into the Pro Football Hall of Fame. At the time, Bill Daley wrote in The New York Times: "Fewer than a dozen men had the durability and continuing excellence to survive the rigors of smashing play for a longer period of time."
- In 1969, he was selected to the National Football League 1940s All-Decade Team.
- In 1970, he was one of the five inaugural inductees into the Fordham University Athletic Hall of Fame.
- In 1971, he was inducted into the New Jersey All Sports Hall of Fame.
- In 1975, he was inducted into the National Polish American Sports Hall of Fame.
- In 1982, he became the third player, after Bronko Nagurski and Red Grange, to receive the prestigious NFL Alumni Order of the Leather Helmet.
- In 1987, he was inducted into the Eagles Hall of Fame.
