= Manske =

Manske is a surname. Notable people with the surname include:

- Edgar Manske (1912–2002), American football player
- John T. Manske (born 1952), American politician
- Lou Manske (1884–1963), American baseball player
- Magnus Manske (born 1974), German software developer
