= Frank Sullivan (American football) =

American football player (1912–1956)

- Frank Sullivan, 1935

No. 12, 18
- Positions: Center, Linebacker

Personal information
- Born: September 16, 1912; Nashville, Tennessee, U.S.
- Died: June 14, 1956 (age 43); Louisville, Kentucky, U.S.
- Listed height: 6 ft 3 in (1.91 m)
- Listed weight: 206 lb (93 kg)

Career information
- High school: Father Ryan (TN)
- College: Loyola (LA)

Career history
- Chicago Bears (1935–1939); Pittsburgh Steelers (1940)
- Stats at Pro Football Reference

Frank Joseph Sullivan (August 16, 1912 – June 14, 1956) was an American football center and linebacker. He played college football for Loyola of New Orleans from 1931 to 1934 and professional football in the National Football League (NFL) for the Chicago Bears from 1935 to 1939. He concluded his playing career with the Pittsburgh Steelers in 1940. He appeared in between 49 and 51 NFL games.

== Early life ==
Sullivan was born in 1912 in Nashville, Tennessee. He attended that city's Father Ryan High School where he played for the football and basketball teams.

== Loyola ==
Sullivan then attended Loyola University New Orleans and played college football for Loyola Wolf Pack from 1931 to 1934. He was a 60-minute player who reportedly was never taken out of a game during his college career. He was selected as the center on Red Grange's All-America team as a senior. Clark Shaughnessy, who coached against Sullivan in college and recommended him to the Bears, said of him:

Sullivan is one of the greatest centers I have ever seen on collegiate gridirons. He has size and brains and best of all, the instinct of the game. his team spirit is excellent and he hasn't a fault either on offensive or defense. He is especially adept at forward pass defense. He's mighty tough and loves to play football.

Sullivan also competed in basketball for Loyola and won the New Orleans Golden Gloves heavyweight boxing championship.

== Professional football ==
Sullivan also played professional football in the National Football League (NFL) as a center and linebacker for the Chicago Bears from 1935 to 1939. He appeared in 41 games with the Bears.

In early August 1941, the Bears traded Sullivan to the Pittsburgh Steelers in exchange for the Steelr's fifth pick on that year's NFL draft. He appeared in between 10 games with the steelers.

== Later life ==
After retiring from football, Sullivan worked for E.I. duPont de Nemour's nitro-cellulose plant in Indiana. He suffered from diabetes and died in 1956 at age 43 after gall bladder surgery.
