= Al Hoptowit =

American football player and coach (1915–1981)

No. 26
- Position: Tackle

Personal information
- Born: September 17, 1915; Yakima, Washington, U.S.
- Died: April 6, 1981 (aged 65); Yakima, Washington, U.S.
- Listed height: 6 ft 1 in (1.85 m)
- Listed weight: 217 lb (98 kg)

Career information
- High school: Wapato (WA)
- College: Washington State
- NFL draft: 1938: 11th round, 91 (by the Cleveland Rams)th overall pick

Career history

Playing
- Chicago Bears (1941); Newark Bears (1941); Chicago Bears (1942–1945)

Coaching
- Akron Bears (1946) (Asst); Washington State Cougars (1947) (Asst)

Awards and highlights
- NFL champion (1943); Second-team All-PCC (1937)
- Stats at Pro Football Reference

Alphonse William Hoptowit (September 7, 1915 – April 6, 1981), nicknamed "Hoppy" and "Tonto", was an American football tackle who played four seasons with the Chicago Bears of the National Football League (NFL). He was drafted by the Cleveland Rams in the eleventh round of the 1938 NFL draft. He played college football at Washington State University and attended Wapato High School in Wapato, Washington. Hoptowit was also a member of the Newark Bears of the American Association.

== College career ==
Hoptowit played for the Washington State Cougars from 1933 to 1937. He earned Second-team All-PCC honors his senior year in 1937.

== Professional career ==
Hoptowit was selected by the Cleveland Rams with the 91st pick in the 1938 NFL draft. He played two seasons of rugby in Canada prior to joining the Chicago Bears.

He came up to the Chicago Bears in 1941 before playing for the Newark Bears of the American Association the same year. Newark was Chicago's farm team. Hoptowit later played in 41 games, starting nineteen, for the Chicago Bears from 1942 to 1945.

== Coaching career ==
Hoptowit served as an assistant coach for the Chicago Bears' farm team, the Akron Bears, in 1946. He was an assistant coach for the Washington State Cougars in 1947.

== Personal life ==
Hoptowit was a Native American.
