= Vic Spadaccini =

American football player (1916–1981)

No. 33
- Position: Fullback

Personal information
- Born: March 2, 1916; Keewatin, Minnesota, U.S.
- Died: April 28, 1981 (aged 65); West St. Paul, Minnesota, U.S.
- Listed height: 6 ft 0 in (1.83 m)
- Listed weight: 222 lb (101 kg)

Career information
- College: Minnesota
- NFL draft: 1938: 12th round, 101st overall pick

Career history
- Cleveland Rams (1938–1940); Columbus Bulls (1941)

Awards and highlights
- Pro Bowl (1940); National champion (1936)

Career NFL statistics
- Receptions: 62
- Receiving yards: 669
- Receiving touchdowns: 3
- Stats at Pro Football Reference

Victor Michael Spadaccini (March 2, 1916 – April 28, 1981) was a professional American football fullback in the National Football League (NFL). He was selected in the 12th round of the 1938 NFL draft. He played three seasons for the Cleveland Rams. A blocking back on offense, he was primary used as a blocker and pass-catcher out of the backfield. His best season was 1939 when he caught 32 passes (a high total for that era) for 292 yards and 1 touchdown. He also did some of the Rams' point-after-touchdown kicking, converting 17 PATs over two seasons. On defense, he played defensive back and recorded 3 interceptions for his career, all accomplished in 1940. He was selected to the Pro Bowl in 1940, his final season. Spadaccini was born and died in Minnesota and attended the University of Minnesota.
