= Tony Matisi =

American football player (1914–1969)

No. 27
- Position: Offensive tackle

Personal information
- Born: August 23, 1914; New York City, U.S.
- Died: August 26, 1969 (aged 55); Endicott, New York, U.S.
- Listed height: 6 ft 2 in (1.88 m)
- Listed weight: 230 lb (104 kg)

Career information
- High school: Union-Endicott
- College: Pittsburgh (1934-1937)
- NFL draft: 1938: 4th round, 29th overall pick

Career history
- Detroit Lions (1938)

Awards and highlights
- National champion (1937); Consensus All-American (1937); First-team All-Eastern (1937); Second-team All-Eastern (1936)

Career NFL statistics
- Games played: 5
- Games started: 1
- Stats at Pro Football Reference

Anthony Francis Matisi (August 23, 1914 – August 26, 1969) was an All-American football player.

Matisi was born in New York City in 1914 and graduated from Union High School in Endicott, New York.

He played college football for the University of Pittsburgh from 1934 to 1937. He helped lead the undefeated 1937 Pittsburgh Panthers football team to a national championship and was a consensus first-team pick at the tackle position on the 1937 All-America college football team. Matisi was six-feet, two-inches tall, and weighed 230 pounds.

Matisi was selected by the Pittsburgh Steelers in the fourth round (29th overall pick) of the 1938 NFL draft. He played for the Detroit Lions in 1938, appearing in five games.

Matisi later received a dental degree from the Baltimore College of Dental Surgery and worked as a dentist in Endicott and Oswego, New York. He died at age 55 in 1969 after a long illness at his home in Endicott.

He also spent time as a professional wrestler.

== See also ==
- List of gridiron football players who became professional wrestlers
