= Jay Turner (American football) =

American football player (1914–1960)

No. 24
- Position: Running back

Personal information
- Born: July 11, 1914; Springfield, Missouri
- Died: November 1960 (age 46)

Career information
- College: George Washington

Career history
- 1938–1939: Washington Redskins
- Stats at Pro Football Reference

Jay Lewis Turner (July 11, 1914 – November 1960) was an American football running back in the National Football League for the Washington Redskins. He attended George Washington University.
