= Bill Rogers (tackle) =

American football player (1913–1977)

Profile
- Position: Tackle

Personal information
- Born: June 24, 1913; Westborough, Massachusetts, U.S.
- Died: April 30, 1977 (aged 63); Northborough, Massachusetts, U.S.
- Listed height: 5 ft 11 in (1.80 m)
- Listed weight: 243 lb (110 kg)

Career information
- High school: Westborough (MA), Brighton Academy (ME)
- College: Villanova

Career history
- Detroit Lions (1938–1940, 1944)

Career NFL statistics
- Games: 25
- Stats at Pro Football Reference

William Curtis Rogers (June 24, 1913 – April 30, 1977) was an American football player.

A native of Westborough, Massachusetts, Rogers attended Westborough High School and Brighton Academy and then played college football at Villanova University.

He then played professional football in the National Football League (NFL) as a tackle for the Detroit Lions. He appeared in 25 games for the Lions from 1938 to 1940 and 1944.
