= Shaw Stadium =

Sports venue in Cleveland, Ohio, United States

- Location within Ohio Shaw Stadium (the United States)
- Interactive map of Shaw Stadium
- Address: 14305 Shaw Ave. East Cleveland, Ohio 44112
- Coordinates: 41°32′27″N 81°35′00″W
- Owner: East Cleveland City Schools

Construction
- Opened: 1923

Tenants
- Cleveland Rams (NFL) 1938; Case Tech Rough Riders (NCAA) 1939–1952; Western Reserve Red Cats (NCAA) 1942, 1946, 1950; Shaw Cardinals (OHSAA) 1923–present

Shaw Stadium is a stadium in East Cleveland, Ohio, United States, mainly used for high school football. The stadium was built in 1923 and is home to the Shaw High School Cardinals football team and marching band.

In 1938, the Cleveland Rams of the National Football League (NFL) played three of their four home games at Shaw, winning two and losing one. The Rams earned their first home NFL victory in franchise history with a defeat of the Detroit Lions, followed by a win over the Chicago Bears.

Both Case Institute of Technology and Western Reserve University, which later merged to create Case Western Reserve University, used Shaw Stadium at various times for their home football field. The Case Tech Rough Riders used Shaw for home football games from 1939 to 1952. Case had previously played at Shaw in the 1920s for games against rival Western Reserve, who were known as the Pioneers at the time, playing there in 1923, 1925, and 1926. Western Reserve University, later known as the Western Reserve Red Cats, held occasional games at Shaw, but used it as their home field for the 1942, 1946, and 1950 seasons.

| Preceded by Cleveland Municipal Stadium & League Park | Home of the Cleveland Rams; 1938 | Succeeded by Cleveland Municipal Stadium |
