= 1938 Brooklyn Dodgers (NFL) season =

National Football League team season

1938 Brooklyn Dodgers season
- Owner: Dan Topping
- Head coach: Potsy Clark
- Home stadium: Ebbets Field

Results
- Record: 4–4–3
- Division place: 3rd NFL Eastern
- Playoffs: Did not qualify

The 1938 Brooklyn Dodgers season was their ninth in the league. The team improved on their previous season's output of 3–7–1, winning four games. They failed to qualify for the playoffs for the seventh consecutive season.

== Schedule ==
Week	Date	Opponent	Result	Record	Venue
1	Bye				
2	September 18	at **Washington Redskins**	**T** 16–16	0–0–1	Griffith Stadium
3	September 23	**Pittsburgh Pirates**	**L** 3–17	0–1–1	Ebbets Field
4	October 2	Chicago Cardinals	**W** 13–0	1–1–1	Ebbets Field
5	October 9	at **Pittsburgh Pirates**	**W** 17–7	2–1–1	Forbes Field
6	October 16	at Green Bay Packers	**L** 7–35	2–2–1	Wisconsin State Fair Park
7	October 23	at **New York Giants**	**L** 14–28	2–3–1	Polo Grounds
8	October 30	**Washington Redskins**	**T** 6–6	2–3–2	Ebbets Field
9	November 6	at **Philadelphia Eagles**	**W** 10–7	3–3–2	Philadelphia Municipal Stadium
10	November 13	**Philadelphia Eagles**	**W** 32–14	4–3–2	Ebbets Field
11	November 20	Chicago Bears	**L** 6–24	4–4–2	Ebbets Field
12	November 24	**New York Giants**	**T** 7–7	4–4–3	Ebbets Field
Note: Intra-division opponents are in **bold** text.

== Roster ==
1938 Brooklyn Dodgers final roster
**Backs**: 4 Vannie Albanese RB/CB; 8 Boyd Brumbaugh FB/LB; 66 Wendell Butcher RB/CB; 10 Scrapper Farrell FB/LB; 48 Beattie Feathers RB/CB; 9 Tony Kaska RB/CB; 1 Ralph Kercheval RB/CB/K; 5 Stan Kosel FB/LB; 7 Ace Parker RB/S/K; 0 Bill Reissig RB/CB/K; **Ends/Receivers**: 19 Jim Austin; 11 Jeff Barrett; 3 Johnny Druze; 14 Harold Hill; 99 Perry Schwartz; 13 Bill Waller	**Linemen/Linebackers**: 23 Norm Cooper C/LB; 27 Leo Disend T/DT; 20 Ox Emerson G/DG; 17 John Golemgeske G/T/DG/DT; 25 Bruiser Kinard T/DT; 12 Lou Mark C/LB; 29 Ed Merlin G/DG; 22 Gene Moore C/LB; 28 Jim Sivell G/DG; 16 Jim Whatley T/DT; Rookies in italics

== Standings ==
NFL Eastern Division
	W	L	T	PCT	DIV	PF	PA	STK
New York Giants	8	2	1	.800	5–2–1	194	79	W1
Washington Redskins	6	3	2	.667	4–2–2	148	154	L1
Brooklyn Dodgers	4	4	3	.500	3–2–3	131	161	T1
Philadelphia Eagles	5	6	0	.455	3–5	154	164	W2
Pittsburgh Pirates	2	9	0	.182	2–6	79	169	L6

Note: Tie games were not officially counted in the standings until 1972.
