= 1938 NFL season =

American football season

Regular season
- Duration: September 9 – December 11, 1938
- East Champions: New York Giants
- West Champions: Green Bay Packers

Championship Game
- Champions: New York Giants

NFL teams: West, East

The 1938 NFL season was the 19th regular season of the National Football League. The season ended when the New York Giants defeated the Green Bay Packers in the NFL Championship Game.

== Draft ==
The 1938 NFL draft was held on December 12, 1937, at Chicago's Hotel Sherman. With the first pick, the Cleveland Rams selected fullback Corbett Davis from Indiana University Bloomington.

== Major rule changes ==
- A new 15-yard penalty for roughing the passer is enacted.
- If a kickoff goes out of bounds, the receiving team may opt to take possession of the ball at their own 45-yard line.
- The penalty for a second forward pass during a play is changed from 5 yards and a loss of down to just 5 yards.

== Division races ==
In Week Seven, the Bears lost at home to the Rams, 23–21, while the Packers beat the Pirates (the future Steelers) 20–0, giving Green Bay the lead for the first time. The Packers won their next three games to clinch the Western Division.

In the Eastern Division, the Redskins led until Week Ten, when they fell to the Bears, 31–7; the Giants' 28–0 win over the Rams gave New York the division lead on November 13. The division title still came down to the last day of the regular season, December 4, when 57,461 turned out at the Polo Grounds in New York to watch the 7–2–1 Giants host the 6–2–2 Redskins. A Washington win would have made them 7–2–2 and New York 7–3–1, with the Skins as division champs. New York needed only to win or tie, and did the former, five touchdowns en route to a 36–0 victory.

Four neutral-site games were held: two at Civic Stadium in Buffalo, New York, one in Erie, Pennsylvania, and one in Charleston, West Virginia. The Buffalo games marked the league's first return to Buffalo since the folding of the Bisons in 1929.

== Final standings ==
NFL Eastern Division
	W	L	T	PCT	DIV	PF	PA	STK
New York Giants	8	2	1	.800	5–2–1	194	79	W1
Washington Redskins	6	3	2	.667	4–2–2	148	154	L1
Brooklyn Dodgers	4	4	3	.500	3–2–3	131	161	T1
Philadelphia Eagles	5	6	0	.455	3–5	154	164	W2
Pittsburgh Pirates	2	9	0	.182	2–6	79	169	L6

Note: Tie games were not officially counted in the standings until 1972.

NFL Western Division
	W	L	T	PCT	DIV	PF	PA	STK
Green Bay Packers	8	3	0	.727	6–2	223	118	L1
Detroit Lions	7	4	0	.636	6–2	119	108	L1
Chicago Bears	6	5	0	.545	3–5	194	148	L1
Cleveland Rams	4	7	0	.364	3–5	131	215	W1
Chicago Cardinals	2	9	0	.182	2–6	111	168	W1

== NFL Championship Game ==
The New York Giants defeated the Green Bay Packers, 23–17, at the Polo Grounds in New York City on December 11, 1938, to win the Championship.

== All-Star game ==
After being crowned champion the Giants faced a team of "Pro All-Stars", an all-star team consisting mostly of NFL players but also including three players from the Los Angeles Bulldogs, in an exhibition game at Wrigley Field in Los Angeles on January 15, 1939. The game, which the Giants won 13–10, was the first of five annual NFL all-star games held under the format (but the only one to include non-NFL players) prior to the creation of the Pro Bowl in 1951.

== League leaders ==
Statistic	Name	Team	Yards
Passing	Ace Parker	Brooklyn	865
Rushing	Whizzer White	Pittsburgh	567
Receiving	Don Hutson	Green Bay	548

== Awards ==
Joe F. Carr Trophy (Most Valuable Player)	Mel Hein, Center, N.Y. Giants

== Coaching changes ==
- Cleveland Rams: Hugo Bezdek was released after three games in 1938. Art Lewis served as interim for the last eight.

== Stadium changes ==
- The Cleveland Rams moved to Shaw Stadium. They spent the previous 1937 season splitting their home games between Cleveland Municipal Stadium and League Park.
- The Detroit Lions started to split their home games between University of Detroit Stadium and Briggs Stadium.

== Sources ==
- NFL Record and Fact Book (ISBN 1-932994-36-X)
- NFL History 1931–1940 (Last accessed December 4, 2005)
- Total Football: The Official Encyclopedia of the National Football League (ISBN 0-06-270174-6)
