= 1938 in Michigan =

- Decades: 1910s; 1920s; 1930s; 1940s; 1950s
- See also: History of Michigan; Historical outline of Michigan; List of years in Michigan; 1938 in the United States

Events from the year 1938 in Michigan.

== Top stories ==
Major Michigan news stories during 1938 included:

- In a shift of the pendulum away from Franklin D. Roosevelt's New Deal, Michigan's Republican party dominated the November 8 elections, including Frank Fitzgerald's victory over incumbent Governor Frank Murphy, a sweep of state offices, and control of 23 of 32 seats in the State Senate and 74 of 100 seats in the lower house.
- Sit-down strikes, bombings, and labor unrest in multiple industries.
- The construction and October 8 opening of the Blue Water Bridge between Port Huron and Sarnia.
- A power struggle in the United Auto Workers (UAW) and accusations of Communist control and graft exchanged between factions loyal to union president Homer Martin, on the one hand, and vice presidents Richard Frankensteen and Wyndham Mortimer, on the other hand.
- The hanging by federal authorities of Tony Chebatoris at the Milan federal detention farm. Chabatoris is the only person to have been executed in Michigan since the state abolished the death penalty in 1846.
- As news intensifies of German repression of Jews, Father Charles Coughlin sparks controversy with anti-Semitic comments, and Detroiters attend a rally to protest Germany's actions.

Major sports stories included:

- The June 22 rematch of Joe Louis vs. Max Schmeling, with Detroit's "Brown Bomber" knocking out his German opponent in the first round.
- Detroit Tigers' first baseman Hank Greenberg threatened Babe Ruth's home run record and led the American League with 58 home runs and 143 runs scored.
- Mickey Cochrane retired as a player and was subsequently fired as manager of the Detroit Tigers. New manager Del Baker led a turnaround in the Tigers' season, as the team compiled a 37–19 record (.661) tunder its new manager.
- After four consecutive seasons in which the Michigan Wolverines football team had failed to compile a winning record, Fritz Crisler was hired as Michigan's football coach. Led by All-American guard Ralph Heikkinen, halfback Tom Harmon and quarterback Forest Evashevski, the 1938 Michigan team finished with a 6–1–1 record.

== Office holders ==
=== State office holders ===
- Governor of Michigan: Frank Murphy (Democrat)
- Lieutenant Governor of Michigan: Leo J. Nowicki (Democrat)
- Michigan Attorney General: Raymond Wesley Starr
- Michigan Secretary of State: Leon D. Case
- Speaker of the Michigan House of Representatives: George A. Schroeder (Democrat)
- Chief Justice, Michigan Supreme Court: Howard Wiest

=== Mayors of major cities ===
- Mayor of Detroit: Richard Reading
- Mayor of Grand Rapids: Tunis Johnson/George W. Welsh
- Mayor of Flint: Harold E. Bradshaw/Harry M. Comins
- Mayor of Dearborn: John Carey
- Mayor of Saginaw: Francis J. McDonald
- Mayor of Lansing: Max A. Templeton
- Mayor of Ann Arbor: Walter C. Sadler

=== Federal office holders ===
- U.S. Senator from Michigan: Prentiss M. Brown (Democrat)
- U.S. Senator from Michigan: Arthur Vandenberg (Republican)
- House District 1: George G. Sadowski (Democrat)
- House District 2: Earl C. Michener (Republican)
- House District 3: Paul W. Shafer (Republican)
- House District 4: Clare Hoffman (Republican)
- House District 5: Carl E. Mapes (Republican)
- House District 6: Andrew J. Transue (Democrat)
- House District 7: Jesse P. Wolcott (Republican)
- House District 8: Fred L. Crawford (Republican)
- House District 9: Albert J. Engel (Republican)
- House District 10: Roy O. Woodruff (Republican)
- House District 11: John F. Luecke (Democrat)
- House District 12: Frank Eugene Hook (Democrat)
- House District 13: George D. O'Brien (Republican)
- House District 14: Louis C. Rabaut (Democrat)
- House District 15: John D. Dingell Sr. (Democrat)
- House District 16: John Lesinski Sr. (Democrat)
- House District 17: George Anthony Dondero (Republican)

== Population ==
In the 1930 United States census, Michigan was recorded as having a population of 4,842,325, ranking as the seventh most populous state in the country. By 1940, Michigan's population had increased by 8.5% to 5,256,106.

=== Cities ===
The following is a list of cities in Michigan with a population of at least 20,000 based on 1930 U.S. Census data. Historic census data from 1920 and 1940 is included to reflect trends in population increases or decreases. Cities that are part of the Detroit metropolitan area are shaded in tan.

1930 Rank	City	County	1920 Pop.	1930 Pop.	1940 Pop.	Change 1930-40
1	Detroit	Wayne	993,678	1,568,662	1,623,452	3.5%
2	Grand Rapids	Kent	137,634	168,592	164,292	−2.6%
3	Flint	Genesee	91,599	156,492	151,543	−3.2%
4	Saginaw	Saginaw	61,903	80,715	82,794	2.6%
5	Lansing	Ingham	57,327	78,397	78,753	0.5%
6	Pontiac	Oakland	34,273	64,928	66,626	2.6%
7	Hamtramck	Wayne	48,615	56,268	49,839	−11.4%
8	Jackson	Jackson	48,374	55,187	49,656	−10.0%
9	Kalamazoo	Kalamazoo	48,487	54,786	54,097	−1.3%
10	Highland Park	Wayne	46,499	52,959	50,810	−4.1%
11	Dearborn	Wayne	2,470	50,358	63,589	26.3%
12	Bay City	Bay	47,554	47,355	47,956	1.3%
13	Battle Creek	Calhoun	36,164	45,573	43,453	−4.7%
14	Muskegon	Muskegon	36,570	41,390	47,697	15.2%
15	Port Huron	St. Clair	25,944	31,361	32,759	4.5%
16	Wyandotte	Wayne	13,851	28,368	30,618	7.9%
17	Ann Arbor	Washtenaw	19,516	26,944	29,815	10.7%
18	Royal Oak	Oakland	6,007	22,904	25,087	9.5%
19	Ferndale	Oakland	2,640	20,855	22,523	8.0%

=== Counties ===
The following is a list of counties in Michigan with populations of at least 50,000 based on 1930 U.S. Census data. Historic census data from 1920 and 1940 are included to reflect trends in population increases or decreases.

1930 Rank	County	Largest city	1920 Pop.	1930 Pop.	1940 Pop.	Change 1930-40
1	Wayne	Detroit	1,177,645	1,888,946	2,015,623	6.7%
2	Kent	Grand Rapids	183,041	240,511	246,338	2.4%
3	Genesee	Flint	125,668	211,641	227,944	7.7%
4	Oakland	Pontiac	90,050	211,251	254,068	20.3%
5	Saginaw	Saginaw	100,286	120,717	130,468	8.1%
6	Ingham	Lansing	81,554	116,587	130,616	12.0%
7	Jackson	Jackson	72,539	92,304	93,108	0.9%
8	Kalamazoo	Kalamazoo	71,225	91,368	100,085	9.5%
9	Calhoun	Battle Creek	72,918	87,043	94,206	8.2%
10	Muskegon	Muskegon	62,362	84,630	94,501	11.7%
11	Berrien	Benton Harbor	62,653	81,066	89,117	9.9%
12	Macomb	Warren	38,103	77,146	107,638	39.5%
13	Bay	Bay City	69,548	69,474	74,981	7.9%
14	St. Clair	Port Huron	58,009	67,563	76,222	12.8%
15	Washtenaw	Ann Arbor	49,520	65,530	80,810	23.3%
16	Ottawa	Holland	47,660	54,858	59,660	8.8%
17	Houghton	Houghton	71,930	52,851	47,631	−9.9%
18	Monroe	Monroe	37,115	52,485	58,620	11.7%
19	Lenawee	Adrian	47,767	49,849	53,110	6.5%

== Sports ==
=== Baseball ===
- 1938 Detroit Tigers season – Under managers Mickey Cochrane and Del Baker, the Tigers compiled an 84-70 record and finished in fourth place in the American League. First baseman Hank Greenberg led the league with 143 runs scored, 58 home runs, and 119 bases on balls. He also led the team with a 315 batting average, .438 on-base percentage, .683 slugging percentage, and 147 RBIs. Tommy Bridges led the pitching staff with 13 wins, and Al Benton led the staff with a 3.30 earned run average (ERA).
- 1938 Michigan Wolverines baseball season - Under head coach Ray Fisher, the Wolverines compiled a 14–12 record. Merle Kremer was the team captain.

=== American football ===
- 1938 Detroit Lions season – Under player-coach Dutch Clark, the Lions compiled a 7–4 record and placed second in the NFL's Western Division. The team's statistical leaders included Vern Huffman with 382 passing yards, Bill Shepherd with 455 rushing yards, and Lloyd Cardwell with 138 receiving yards and 30 points scored.
- 1938 Michigan Wolverines football team – In their first year under head coach Fritz Crisler, the Wolverines compiled a 6–1–1 record, tied for second place in the Big Ten Conference, and were ranked No. 16 in the final AP Poll.
- 1938 Michigan State Spartans football team – Under head coach Charlie Bachman, the Spartans compiled a 6–3 record. Halfback John Pingel was selected by the Associated Press and International News Service as a first-team All-American.
- 1938 Central Michigan Bearcats football team - Under head coach Ron Finch the Bercats compiled a 7–1 record.
- 1938 Michigan State Normal Hurons football team - Under head coach Elton Rynearson, the Hurons compiled a 6–1–1 record.
- 1938 Detroit Titans football team – The Titans compiled a 6–4 record under head coach Gus Dorais.
- 1938 Western State Hilltoppers football team - Under head coach Mike Gary, the Hilltoppers compiled a 4–3 record.
- 1938 Wayne Tartars football team – The Tartars compiled a 2–6 record under head coach Joe Gembis.

=== Basketball ===
- 1937–38 Detroit Titans men's basketball team – Under head coach Lloyd Brazil, the Titans compiled a 16–4 record. Sophomore Bob Calihan broke the school's scoring record with 196 points in 19 games. Callihan later served as the Titans' head basketball coach from 1948 to 1969.
- 1937–38 Wayne Tartars men's basketball team – Under coach Newman Ertell, Wayne compiled a 14–4 record.
- 1937–38 Michigan Wolverines men's basketball team – Under head coach Franklin Cappon, the Wolverines compiled a 12–8 record. John "Jake" Townsend broke Michigan's single-season scoring record with 226 points (81 field goals and 64 of 91 free throws) in 20 games.
- 1937–38 Michigan State Spartans men's basketball team – Under head coach Benjamin Van Alstyne, the Spartans compiled a 9–8 record.
- 1937–38 Western Michigan Broncos men's basketball team – Under head coach Buck Read, the Broncos compiled a 6–12 record.

=== Ice hockey ===
- 1937–38 Detroit Red Wings season – Under coach Jack Adams, the Red Wings compiled a 12–25–11 record and finished in fourth place in the National Hockey League (NHL) American Division. The team's statistical leaders included Carl Liscombe with 14 goals, Marty Barry with 20 assists, and Herbie Lewis with 31 points. Normie Smith was the team's goaltender.
- 1937–38 Michigan Wolverines men's ice hockey team – Under head coach Ed Lowrey, the Wolverines compiled a 13–6 record.
- 1937–38 Michigan Tech Huskies men's ice hockey team – Under head coach Joe Savini, the Huskies compiled a 4–11–1 record.

=== Other ===
- Port Huron to Mackinac Boat Race – Fred S. Field's Evening Star won the 14th annual yacht race, crossing the finish line on July 18 with a time of 49:49:29.
- Michigan Open - Marvin Stahl of Lansing won the Michigan Open golf championship on July 20 at the Cascade Hills Country Club in Grand Rapids.
- APBA Gold Cup – Count Theo Rossi won the Gold Cup powerboat race on the Detroit River on September 5.

== Chronology of events ==
=== January ===
- January 4 - Richard Reading took the oath as the new Mayor of Detroit.
- January 4 - Gertude Bennett, age 17 and the daughter of Ford personnel director Harry Bennett, disappeared, triggering a search. the next day, she was found to have eloped to be married in Indiana with a 21-year-old trap drummer and clog dancer.
- January 5 - The National Labor Relations Board rejected Ford Motor's request for a rehearing in its suit for unfair practices in violation of the Wagner Act.
- January 8 - Detroit automobile plants recalled 61,000 employees to work
- January 9 - Governor Frank Murphy proposed a state income tax
- January 13 - Deputies used tear gas to disperse 400 UAW pickets at the New Haven Foundry. Two Macomb County deputy sheriffs were injured when picketers hurled volleys of scrap iron and rocks.
- January 15 - The body of Detroit real estate broker Edna Mae Cummings was found in a field near Belleville, Michigan. Another real estate broker Julia Barker initially confessed to the killing and was arrested but later repudiated the confession, claiming that she acted in self defense after Cummings drew the gun and threatened to kill her. Both Cummings and Barker were under indictment in Kentucky for real estate fraud. On June 2, Barker was found guilty of murder. She was sentenced to 10–15 years in the Detroit House of Corrections.
- January 25 - Governor Murphy declared an emergency after the worst blizzard since the 1890s struck the Upper Peninsula where drifts were reported at 30 feet. On the morning of January 25, a fire fanned by high winds from the blizzard destroyed several business buildings in downtown Marquette.
- January 29 - Franco Ghione signed a three-year contract extending his tenure as music director and conductor of the Detroit Symphony Orchestra.

=== February ===
- February 2 - Former Michigan Attorney General Harry S. Toy announced his candidacy for the Republican gubernatorial nomination. He ultimately lost to former Governor Frank Fitzgerald.
- February 4 - Approximately 150,000 UAW members conducted a demonstration in Detroit
- February 6–7 - Heavy rains and melting snow in Kent, Mount Clemens, Saginaw, and Muskegon areas triggers flooding of homes and farmland, blocks highways, and washes out bridges.
- February 9 - Fritz Crisler was hired as the head football coach at the University of Michigan. Crisler compiled a 71–16–3 record in 10 years as Michigan's coach.
- February 14 - Flooding in Mount Clemens required evacuation of hundreds of homes
- February 16 - Mickey Cochrane announced his retirement as a player.
- February 18 - The board of trustees of the Ford Brotherhood of America repudiates a vote of affiliation with the UAW.
- February 20 - Two Owosso men drowned in an attempt to shoot the Shiawassee River falls in a canoe at the Parshall mill dam.

=== March ===
- March 1 - Detroit Police deploy 150 officers to eject 38 sit-down strikers from a Consolidated Brass Company plant.
- March 20 - The Detroit Red Wings concluded their season with a 4-3 win over the New York Rangers. A ceremony was held between periods honoring Larry Aurie in his final game. Aurie had played with the club since 1927. Aurie's jersey No. 6 was retired after the season, the first Detroit player to be so honored.
- March 26 - Gambling raids in Mount Clemens result in 271 arrests
- March 26 - A raid in Bay City results in seizure of more than $25,000 in marijuana and the arrests of 10 Mexicans.
- March 30 - A riot by striking workers at the Federal Screw Works in Detroit was triggered when police attempted to escort workers into the plant. The incident resulted in injuries to 40 persons, including 13 police officers.

=== April ===
- April 2 - Striking workers seized six utility plants in Jackson, Bay City, Flint, and Milwaukee. Governor Murphy urged the CIO leaders to withdraw from the plants.
- April 12 - Mr. and Mrs. Henry Ford celebrated their 50th wedding anniversary with 700 guests at Independence Hall, Greenfield Village.
- April 15 - Police seized $20,000 in marijuana in Muskegon and Maple Rapids.
- April 16 - The Wright Brothers home and bicycle shop opened at Greenfield Village in a ceremony attended by Orville Wright and Henry Ford.
- April 21 - Secretary of Agriculture Henry Wallace gave a speech at Michigan State College on the Nazis' racial theories.
- April 22 - The Detroit Tigers lost to the Cleveland Indians in the home opener at the newly-expanded Briggs Stadium. The crowd of 54,500 was the largest to attend a baseball game in Detroit to that time.
- April 23 - UAW workers at the Buick and Chevrolet plants voted to strike in protest against the use of preferred lists in laying off men

=== May ===
- May 2 - Mikhail Press, famed composer and Michigan State professor, confirmed that he had married a 23-year-old coed
- May 3 - CIO workers at the Bay City Chevrolet plant took possession of the plant.
- May 6 - A blackpowder bomb was detonated at the Cadillac Gingerale Co. plant at 9:40 p.m. on a Friday evening in downtown Detroit.
- May 12 - Two Newberry men were held on charges of robbing and murdering Charles Toy, a 67-year-old Chinese laundryman. Both were convicted and sentenced to death.
- May 23 - A chemical explosion at the Dow Chemical laboratory in Midland killed five persons who were showered with molten metal.
- May 28 - A celebration was held and broadcast coast to coast in recognition of the joining of the American and Canadian sides of the Blue Water Bridge between Port Huron and Sarnia.
- May 27 - Ford, GM, and Chrysler were indicted for alleged conspiracy to violate the Sherman Antitrust Act

=== June ===
- June 1 - 600 farmers protested in Adrian against reductions in their corn acreage allotments under a crop control program.
- June 2 - Pitcher Schoolboy Rowe, suffering from arm trouble, was released by the Detroit Tigers to a minor league team in Beaumont, Texas
- June 4 - Three men drowned at a bullfrog hunt in Cass County.
- June 21 - Homer Martin, president of the UAW, pledged to purge the union of Communists.
- June 22 - During a strike by workers at 350 Kroger grocery stores, bombs were thrown from cars at five Kroger stores on the west side of Detroit, all within 15 minutes shortly after midnight.
- June 22 - In the rematch of Joe Louis vs. Max Schmeling, Detroit's Brown Bomber knocked out his German opponent in the first round before a crowd of 80,000 at Yankee Stadium in New York City.

=== July ===
- July 5 - The Republican Party celebrated its 84th anniversary with a rally under the Jackson Oaks in Jackson, Michigan.
- July 8 - Tony Chebatoris, Detroit gangster and convicted murderer and bank robber, was hanged at the Milan federal detention farm, the only execution in Michigan since 1846.
- July 26 – August 6 - The UAW executive board conducted a trial of four suspended international officers at the union's headquarters in Detroit. The ouster of the four officers, and their trial, was led by UAW president Homer Martin who charged that Richard Frankensteen, Wyndham Mortimer, Ed Hall, and Walter Wells were in league with the Communist Party. Attorney Maurice Sugar represented the defendants. Sugar counter-charged that it was Martin's faction that was, in fact, under the control of former Communist Party leader Jay Lovestone. Each side also accused the other of graft in connection with a group insurance program. The trial ended on August 6 with the executive board expelling Frankensteen, Mortimer and Wells for attempting to turn the union over to the Communist Party.
- July 28 - Detroit's eight-story Imperial Hotel was rocked by a black powder bomb thrown through the window of the boiler room. John Anhut, president of the hotel, was a leader on behalf of local hotels in connection with labor disputes.
- July 30 - Henry Ford celebrated his 75th birthday on a day proclaimed as "Henry Ford Day". A banquet at the Masonic Temple capped a day of celebrations.

=== August ===
- August 2 - Dodge heir, Daniel Dodge, married the daughter of a Manitoulin Island tugboat captain. He drowned in Georgian Bay while on his honeymoon on August 16.
- August 6 - After five years as manager of the Detroit Tigers, Mickey Cochrane was fired by team owner Walter Briggs Sr. and replaced with Del Baker.
- August 20 - In the wake of the UAW expulsion of Richard Frankensteen, and grass roots efforts to reinstate him, Frankensteen's garage was damaged by the explosion of a black powder bomb.

=== September ===
- September 12 - 50,000 Michigan auto workers were called back to work in preparation for new model season.
- September 13 - In the Republican gubernatorial primary, Frank Fitzgerald defeated Harry Toy by almost 200,000 votes and a margin of approximately two-to-one.
- September 16 - A compromise plan between the warring factions of the UAW, brokered by John L. Lewis and other leaders of the CIO, was approved by the union's executive board. The CIO compromise plan was initially opposed by UAW president Homer Martin as an attack on the UAW's autonomy. The plan provided for a review of the August expulsion of four UAW officers.
- September 22 - Flint hosted its first Motor Festival. A crowd of 60,000 watched a Mardi Gras parade.
- September 27 - Hank Greenberg hit his 57th and 58th home runs of the season, leaving him two short of Babe Ruth's record with five games remaining in the season.
- September 30 - On the eve of the season's first football game, a crowd of approximately 1,200 University of Michigan students attempted to crash the gate at the Michigan Theater and then set fires in the streets of Ann Arbor. Ann Arbor police called in the State Police for assistance with the disturbance.

=== October ===
- October 1 - In the first game under new head coach Fritz Crisler, Michigan defeated Michigan State in football by a 14-0 score before a crowd of 82,500 in Ann Arbor. Michigan had lost five straight games to Michigan State prior to 1938.
- October 2 - On the final day of the baseball season, Hank Greenberg ended the season two short of Babe Ruth's home run record as Bob Feller struck out 18 Detroit batters to break his own new Major League record.
- October 4 - Four U.A.W. officers expelled in August, including Richard T. Frankensteen, Wyndham Mortimer, and Ed Hall were reinstated as part of the compromise settlement negotiated by the CIO.
- October 8 - Governor Frank Murphy and Ontario Premier Mitchell Hepburn dedicated the $3.25 million Blue Water Bridge connecting Port Huron and Sarnia, festivities included more than 30,000 pedestrians crossing the bridge, fireworks, banquets, an international boat parade, and a traditional parade in Port Huron
- October 8–15,000 workers walked off the job at the main Plymouth plant to protest to the decision to switch from a 32-hour workweek to a 40-hour workweek. The UAW sought the 32-hour workweek until all workers were recalled to work by the Big Three.
- October 12 - Ernest G. Liebold, Ford Motor executive fervent anti-Semite received the order of merit of the Supreme Court of the German Eagle by order of Chancellor Adolf Hitler.
- October 14 - Detroit Mayor Richard Reading ordered all departments to begin a search for Communists and to remove them from city jobs.
- October 17 - Fern Patricia Dull, blonde secretary and paramour, shot and killed former prosecuting attorney William Holbrook in front of the Benton Harbor municipal building She was convicted of manslaughter on December 21. She was sentenced to 14 to 15 years in the Detroit House of Corrections.
- October 17 - Two planes collided over a golf driving range near Detroit's Motor City airport, killing five persons.
- October 18 - GM Chairman Alfred Sloan announced the rehiring of 35,000 workers due to the improved business trend.
- October 19 - More than 200 forest fires raged in the lower peninsula
- October 23 - Mr. and Mrs. Wilfred Pichette, a couple from Dollar Bay, Michigan, killed their 19-year-old housekeeper in a purported effort to "cast out a devil". The husband choked the girl, breaking her neck, and beat her with a flatiron, while the wife struck the girl with a poker. The couple's seven-year-old daughter witnessed the slaying and helped remove the body. Both pled guilty to murder on November 16.
- October 30 - Orson Welles' radio dramatization of "The War of the Worlds" was broadcast over WJR radio in Detroit, spreading hysteria in the city and causing a deluge of calls to police stations and newspaper offices. An editorial in the Detroit Free Press condemned the broadcast as "childish smart aleckism", "evil sensationalism", and "a piece of inexcusable and unforgivable stupidity".

=== November ===
- November 1 - The Public Works Administration declared that the application for funding of a proposed Mackinac Straits bridge, estimated to cost $25-$30 million, was dead.
- November 8 - Republicans won their most sweeping victory in Michigan elections since 1930, including the following:

- Republican Frank Fitzgerald defeated Democratic incumbent Frank Murphy for Governor. (In March 1939, Fitzgerald died, just two month after taking the office.)
- Republican Luren Dickinson defeated Democratic incumbent Leo J. Nowicki for Lieutenant Governor.
- Republican Harry Kelly defeated Democratic incumbent Leon D. Case for Secretary of State.
- Republican Thomas Read defeated Democratic incumbent Raymond Wesley Starr for Attorney General.
- Three incumbent Democratic Congressman lost their seats to Republicans:

District 6: Republican William W. Blackney (55.0%) defeated Democratic incumbent Andrew J. Transue (45.0%)
District 11: Republican Frederick Van Ness Bradley (51.4%) defeated Democratic incumbent John F. Luecke (48.6%)
District 13: Republican Clarence J. McLeod (50.6%) defeated Democratic incumbent George D. O'Brien (48.9%)

- In elections for the Michigan Legislature, Republicans won 23 of 32 seats in the Senate and 74 of 100 seats in the lower house.
- A ballot measure, State Amendment No. 3, passed by a wide margin requiring all revenue raises from weight taxes and license plates to be earmarked for good roads.

- November 11 - The Detroit Automobile Show opened with 15,762 visitors in the first 12 hours.
- November 14 - General Motors Chairman Alfred Sloan announced two new benefits plans for 1939 designed to insure 60% of a full year's wages to 150,000 company employees.
- November 20 - Two weeks after Kristallnacht (the Nazi attack on German and Austrian Jews, their synagogues, and businesses), a protest meeting against Germany's persecution of Jews was held at the Detroit Naval Armory. Some 5,000 persons attended, including Governor Frank Murphy and labor leaders. A resolution was passed asking the United States to support resettlement of Jews and calling for a trade embargo against Germany until the persecution ended.
- November 20 - On his national radio broadcast, Father Charles Coughlin, referring to the millions of Christians killed by the Communists in Russia, said "Jewish persecution only followed after Christians first were persecuted." After this speech, some radio stations, including those in New York City and Chicago, began refusing to air Coughlin's speeches without subjecting his scripts to prior review and approval. In New York City, his programs were cancelled by WINS and WMCA, and Coughlin broadcast only on the Newark part-time station WHBI.
- November 25 - A sit-down strike by 150 workers at the Chevrolet Gear and Axle Plant in Detroit, leaving 3,500 workers at the plant out of work.
- November 30 - After meeting with Rabbi Leo M. Franklin, Henry Ford issued a public statement criticizing Nazi persecution of Jews and favoring admission of European Jews to the United States under a selective quota system. Father Coughlin claimed that Rabbi Franklin had written the statement and passed it off as that of Ford.

=== December ===
- December 1 - UAW president Homer Martin testified before the Dies Committee on Un-American Activities that virtually all strikes that slowed production in the automobile industry in the past two years were instigated by Communists.
- December 2 - The Southeastern Michigan Tourist and Publicity Association passed a resolution at its annual meeting advocating that Michigan be referred to as the Lake State rather than the Wolverine State, and describing the wolverine as "a cowardly, slothful and gluttonous beast".
- December 3 - Michigan guard Ralph Heikkinen and Michigan State halfback Johnny Pingel were named by the Associated Press to the All-America team.
- December 12 - The Public Works Administration rejected funding for a proposed $40 million subway system in Detroit.
- December 13 - Black Legion leader Roy Hepner was released from prison after two years for his activities in the white supremacist group.
- December 22 - The Department of Labor announced that the 2,975 plants in Michigan added 62,500 news jobs in November, an increase of 11.8% over the prior month.

== Births ==
- January 8 - Bob Eubanks, host of The Newlywed Game, in Flint, Michigan
- January 27 - Fred Julian, football player and coach, in Detroit
- February 4 - Donald W. Riegle, U.S. Senator (1976-1995), in Flint, Michigan
- March 2 - Lawrence Payton, original member of the Four Tops inducted into the Rock and Roll Hall of Fame as such, in Detroit
- March 8 - Pete Dawkins, winner of the 1958 Heisman Trophy, in Royal Oak, Michigan
- March 9 - Roy Brooks, jazz drummer, in Detroit
- March 13 - Erma Franklin, gospel and soul singer, in Shelby, Mississippi
- March 23 - Dave Pike, jazz vibraphone and marimba player, in Detroit
- March 23 - Emory Clark, rower and 1964 Olympic gold medalist, in Detroit
- April 15 - Marilyn Jean Kelly, Justice of the Michigan Supreme Court (1997-2013), in Detroit
- May 9 - Lovell Coleman, running back in the Canadian Football League (1960–70) and CFL's Most Outstanding Player Award in 1964, in Hamtramck, Michigan
- June 18 - Darrell Harper, American football halfback and placekicker, in Commerce Township, Michigan
- July 1 - John Glick, abstract expressionist ceramicist, in Detroit
- July 15 - Paul Rochester, defensive tackle in AFL/NFL (1960–69), in Lansing, Michigan
- August 27 - Napoleon Chagnon, anthropologist known for work with Amazon tribes, in Port Austin, Michigan
- September 15 - Sylvia Moy, Motown songwriter and producer ("Uptight (Everything's Alright)", "My Cherie Amour", "It Takes Two"), in Detroit
- September 20 - Tom Tresh, Major League Baseball player, in Detroit
- October 15 - Marv Johnson, R&B and soul singer for Tamla ("You Got What It Takes"), in Detroit
- October 25 - Don Davis, record producer ("You Don't Have to Be a Star (To Be in My Show)") and banker, in Detroit
- November 7 - Jim Kaat, Major League Baseball pitcher (1959–83) and 16× Gold Glove Award, in Zeeland, Michigan
- November 19 - Warren "Pete" Moore, bass singer for The Miracles inducted into the Rock and Roll Hall of Fame as such, in Detroit
- December 3 - Walker Evans, off-road driver and member of the Off-road Motorsports Hall of Fame, in Cedar Lake, Michigan
- December 10 - Grady Alderman, offensive tackle in the NFL (1960–74) and 6× Pro Bowl, in Detroit

=== Gallery of 1938 births ===
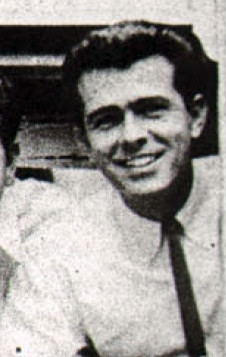
Bob Eubanks

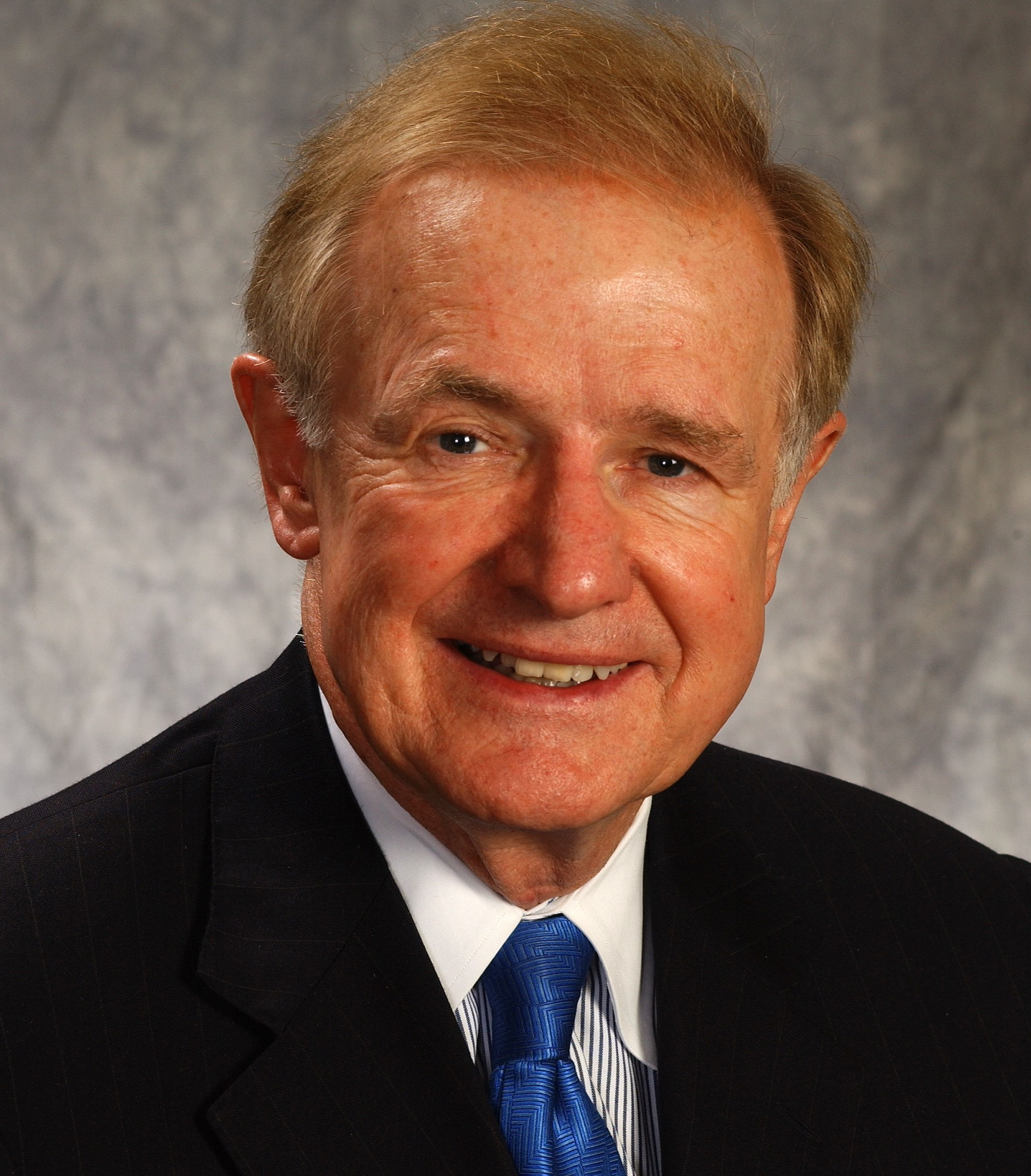
Donald W. Riegle Jr.

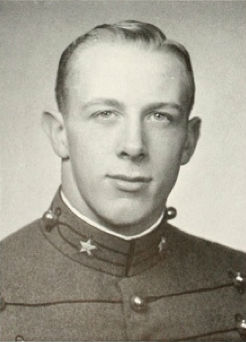
Pete Dawkins

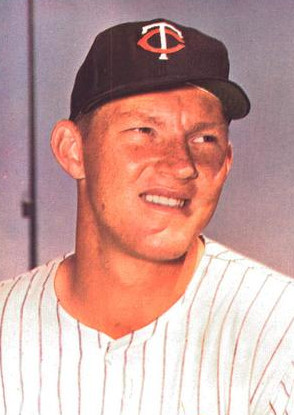
Jim Kaat

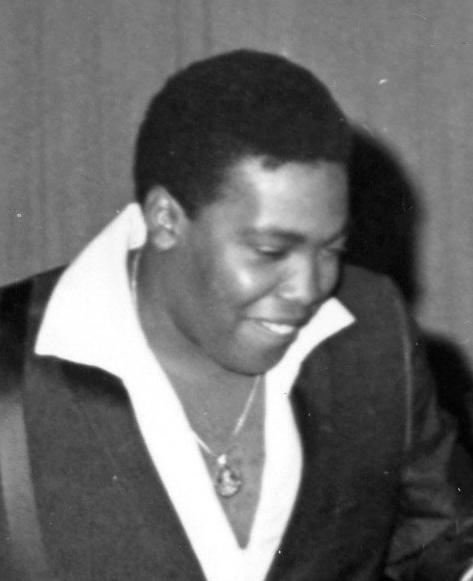
Lawrence Payton

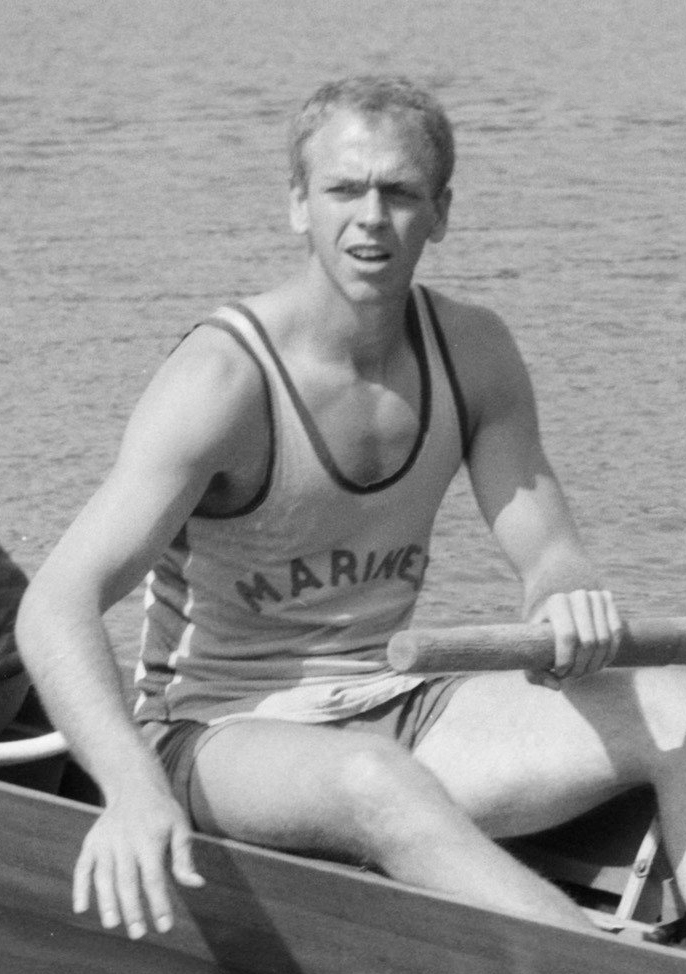
Emory Clark

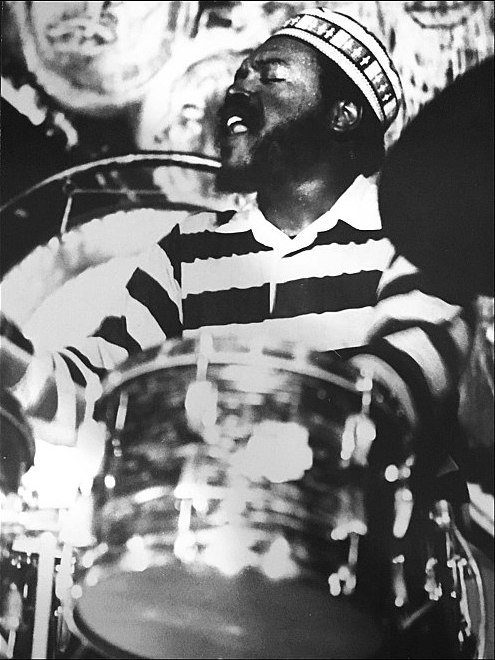
Roy Brooks

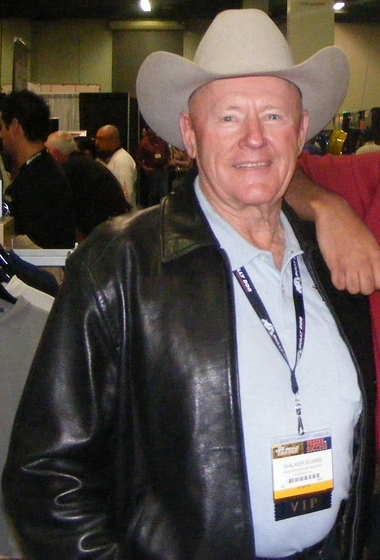
Walker Evans

Warren "Pete" Moore

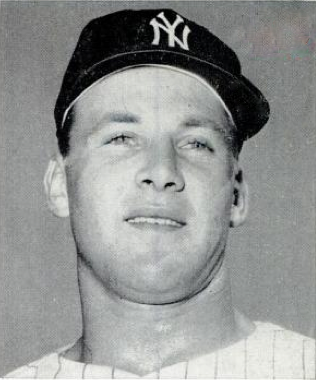
Tom Tresh

== Deaths ==
- February 13 - Francis Charles McMath, engineer, business executive and astronomer, at age 71 in Detroit
- February 19 - Richard A. Whiting, songwriter ("Hooray for Hollywood", "Ain't We Got Fun?", "On the Good Ship Lollipop") who grew up and began his career in Detroit, at age 46 in Beverly Hills, California
- March 20 - Bob Fothergill, outfielder for Detroit Tigers (1922–30) and career .325 hitter, of a stroke at age 40 in Detroit
- April 3 - Count Campau, Major League Baseball player (1888–94) and Detroit native, in New Orleans
- June 4 - Edward N. Hines, pioneer in good roads development, at age 68 in Detroit
- June 17 - Royal S. Copeland, mayor of Ann Arbor and later U.S. Senator from New York, at age 69 in Washington, D.C.
- June 26 - William P. Bradley, served 20 years on Detroit's city council, at age 70 in Detroit
- July 2 - Poet Douglas Malloch died from a heart attack in a Muskegon hospital at age 61
- July 8 - Tony Chebatoris, gangster and only person executed in Michigan since 1846, by hanging at age 40 in Milan, Michigan
- July 17 - Elizabeth Lennon Mahon, the first female to run for the Michigan Legislature, died of a heart attack in her Detroit apartment.
- July 27 - Ella Mae Backus, Assistant U.S. attorney in the Western District of Michigan for 35 years, in Grand Rapids at age 76
- August 8 - Mrs. Walter Chrysler, wife of the automobile manufacturer, at their home in Great Neck, New York, at age 62
- October 21 - Arnold H. Goss, co-founder of General Motors in 1906 and founder and first president of Kelvinator, at age 63 from a self-inflicted razor would at his home near Ann Arbor
- November 18 - Thomas A. E. Weadock, judge and Congressman, at age 88 in Detroit

=== Gallery of 1938 deaths ===
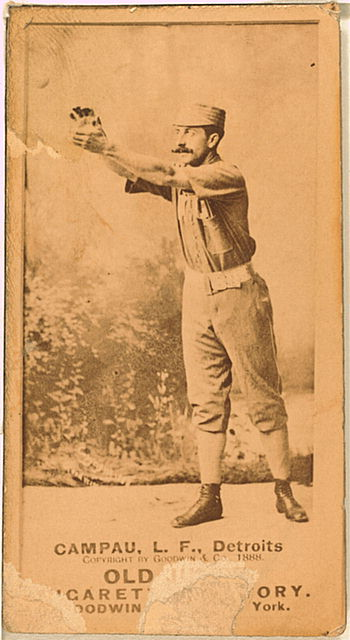
Count Campau

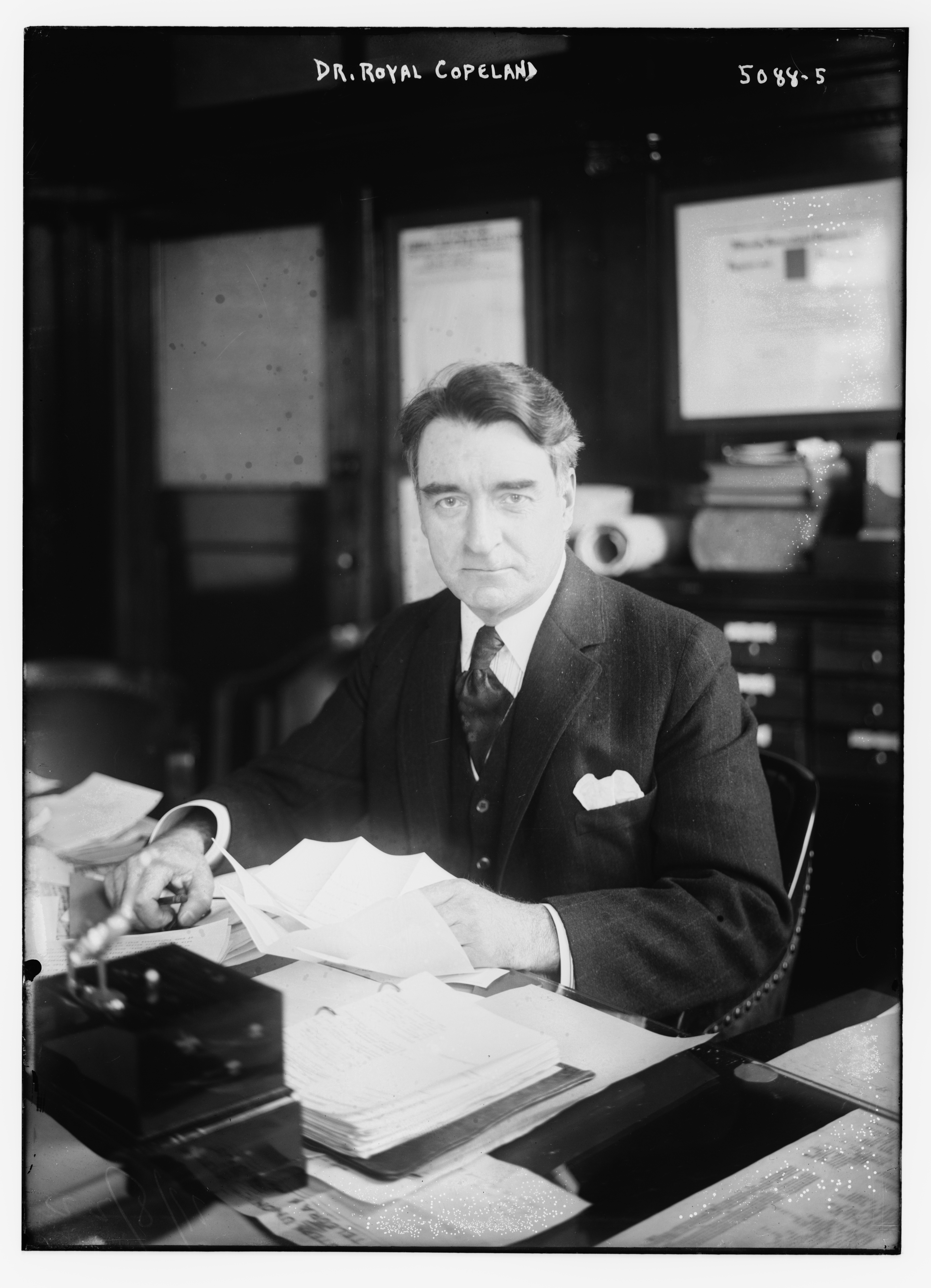
Royal S. Copeland

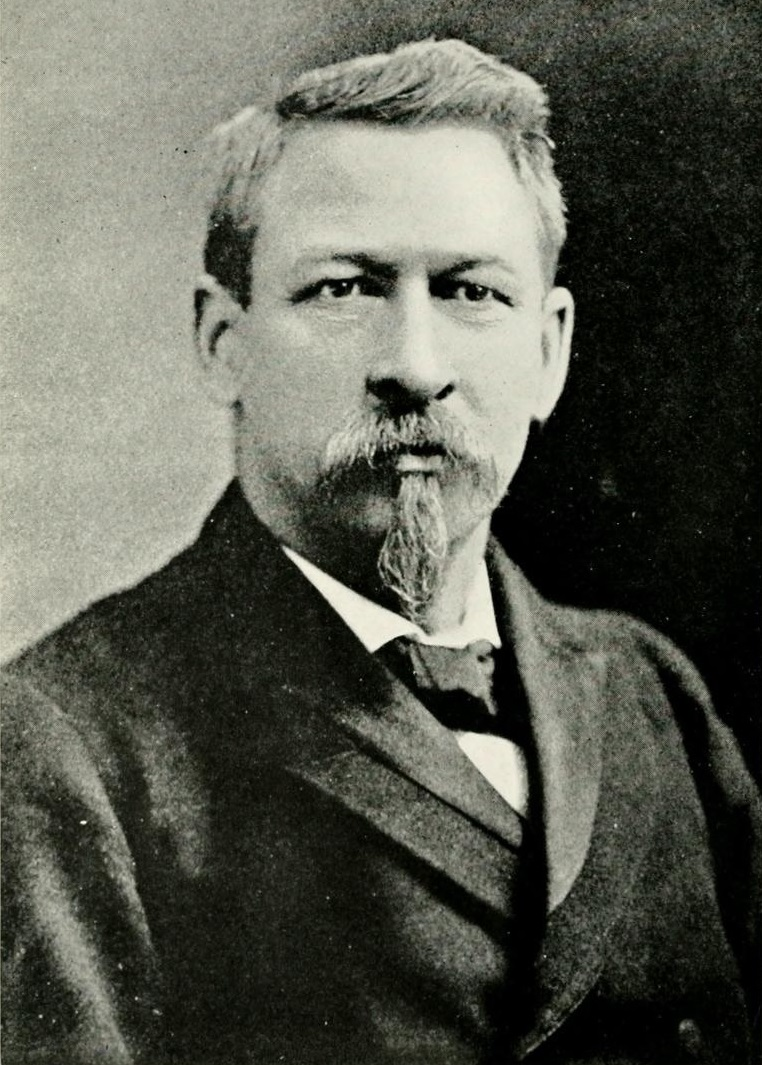
Thomas A.E. Weadock

== See also ==
- History of Michigan
- History of Detroit
