= 1938 Akron Zippers football team =

American college football season

1938 Akron Zippers football
- Conference: Independent
- Record: 6–3
- Head coach: Jim Aiken (3rd season)
- Captain: Walter Kominic
- Home stadium: Buchtel Field

1938 Midwestern college football independents records
	Conf.			Overall
Team	W	L	T	W		L		T
No. 5 Notre Dame		–		8	–	1	–	0
Central Michigan		–		7	–	1	–	0
Michigan State Normal		–		6	–	1	–	1
Xavier		–		7	–	2	–	0
Akron		–		6	–	3	–	0
Michigan State		–		6	–	3	–	0
Detroit Tech		–		6	–	3	–	0
Detroit		–		6	–	4	–	0
Western State Teachers		–		4	–	3	–	0
Cincinnati		–		4	–	5	–	0
Haskell		–		2	–	6	–	0
Wayne		–		2	–	6	–	0
DePaul		–		2	–	7	–	0
Michigan Tech		–		1	–	5	–	0
Marquette		–		1	–	7	–	0
Rankings from AP poll

The 1938 Akron Zippers football team was an American football team that represented the University of Akron as an independent during the 1938 college football season. In its third and final season under head coach Jim Aiken, the team compiled a 6–3 record and outscored opponents by a total of 117 to 94. Walter Kominic was the team captain.

Back Frank Zazula was the team's leading scorer with 44 points on seven touchdowns and two points after touchdown.

== Schedule ==
Date	Opponent	Site	Result	Attendance	Source
September 24	Wabash	Buchtel Field; Akron, OH	W 38–0		
October 1	at Wayne	Keyworth Stadium; Detroit, MI	L 0–16	5,000	
October 8	Xavier	Buchtel Field; Akron, OH	L 0–38		
October 15	Western State Teachers (MI)	Buchtel Field; Akron, OH	W 6–0		
October 22	at Baldwin–Wallace	Berea, OH	W 20–6		
October 29	No. 16 Carnegie Tech	Buchtel Field; Akron, OH	L 13–27	12,000	
November 5	Illinois Wesleyan	Buchtel Field; Akron, OH	W 21–0		
November 12	Toledo	Buchtel Field; Akron, OH	W 13–7		
November 19	John Carroll	Buchtel Field; Akron, OH	W 6–0		
Rankings from AP Poll released prior to the game

== Personnel ==
=== Players ===
- Al Abdulla, fullback, junior, No. 25
- Jack Fagan, center, junior, No. 26
- Michael Fisher, center, junior, No. 66
- Walter Kominic, fullback, junior, No. 38
- Fred Maligio, guard, junior, No. 57
- Richard McCarthy, tackle, junior, No. 42
- Marshall Meacham, halfback, junior, No. 33
- Dick Miller, guard, junior, No. 20
- Andrew Ondecker, halfback, sophomore, No. 29
- Dominic Patella, tackle, junior, No. 42
- Frank Simonetti, guard, junior, No. 37
- Jim Whitten, end, sophomore, No. 41
- Frank Zazula, quarterback, junior, No. 24

=== Staff ===
- Head coach - Jim Aiken
- Assistant coach - Paul Bixler
