= Bert Noblet =

Biographical details
- Born: March 22, 1897
- Died: November 26, 1984 (aged 87)

Playing career

Football
- 1919–1921: Michigan Agricultural
- Positions: Quarterback, halfback

Coaching career (HC unless noted)

Football
- 1929–1935: Michigan Tech

Ice hockey
- 1929–1937: Michigan Tech

Administrative career (AD unless noted)
- 1929: Michigan Tech

Head coaching record
- Overall: 15–16–3 (football); 51–61–11 (ice hockey)

Ubald J. "Bert" Noblet (March 22, 1897 – November 26, 1984) was an American college football player and coach, college ice hockey coach, and forestry professor.

== Michigan Agricultural College ==
Noblet attended Michigan State University–then known as Michigan Agricultural College, where he starred as a halfback and quarterback on the school's football team.

== Michigan Tech ==
Noblet began his career at Michigan Technological University in Houghton, Michigan in 1929. He served as the school's head football coach (1929–1935) and head men's ice hockey coach (1929–1937). He is also credited with starting the forestry department at Michigan Tech.

== Head coaching record ==
=== College football ===
Record table
Season	Team	Overall	Conference	Standing	Postseason
Michigan Tech Huskies (Independent) (1929–1935)
1929	Michigan Tech	2–2–1			
1930	Michigan Tech	1–5			
1931	Michigan Tech	3–2			
1932	Michigan Tech	4–1			
1933	Michigan Tech	2–2			
1934	Michigan Tech	1–2–1			
1935	Michigan Tech	2–2–1			
Michigan Tech:		15–16–3			
Total:		15–16–3			

=== Ice hockey ===
Record table
Season	Team	Overall	Conference	Standing	Postseason
Michigan Tech Huskies Independent (1929–1937)
1929–30	Michigan Tech	5–7–1			
1930–31	Michigan Tech	2–7–0			
1931–32	Michigan Tech	5–6–2			
1932–33	Michigan Tech	9–5–1			
1933–34	Michigan Tech	13–8–1			
1934–35	Michigan Tech	4–11–2			
1935–36	Michigan Tech	6–9–1			
1936–37	Michigan Tech	7–8–3			
Michigan Tech:		51–61–11			
Total:		51–61–11			
