= 1938 Detroit Tech Dynamics football team =

American college football season

1938 Detroit Tech Dynamics football
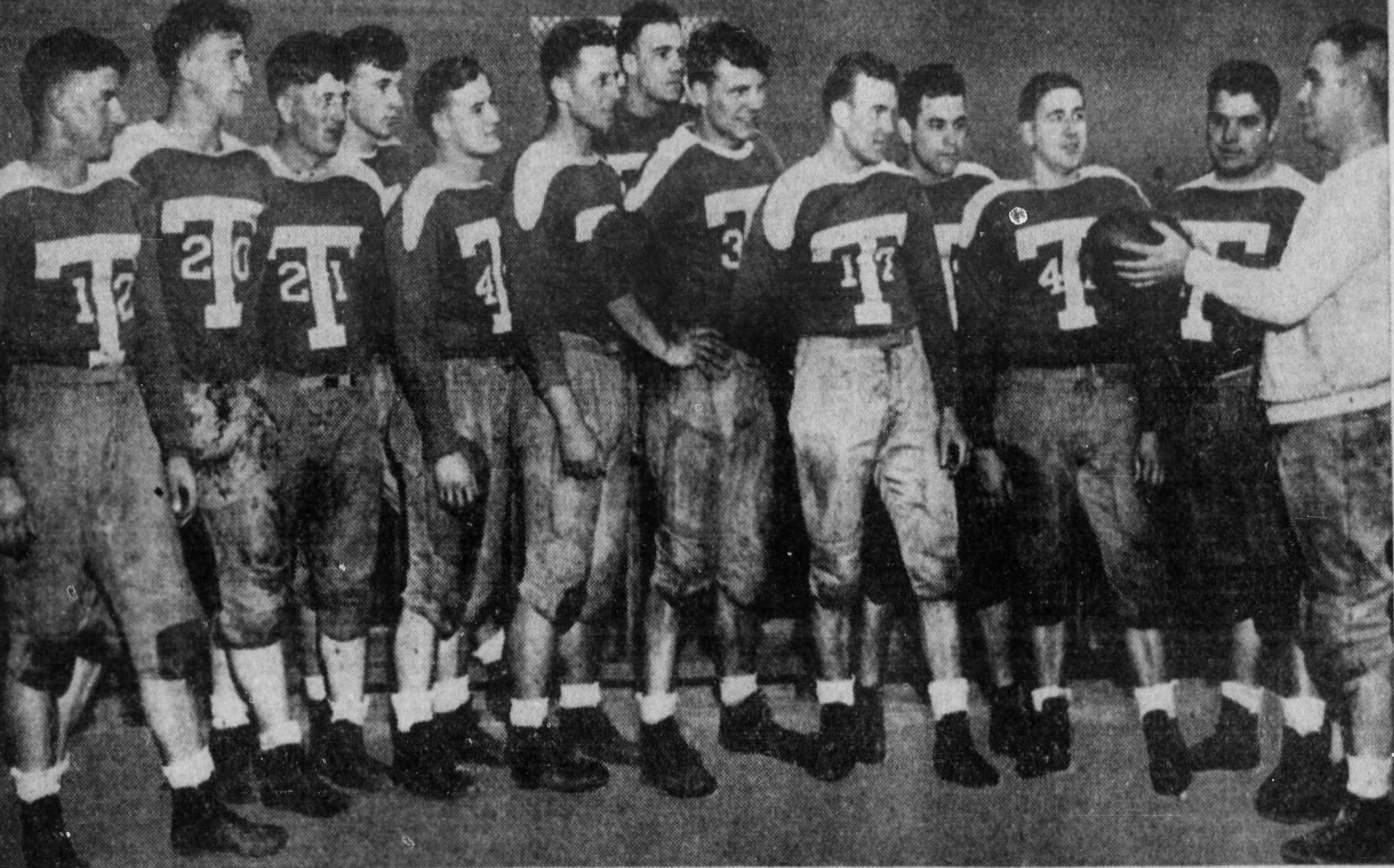
- Detroit Tech players with Hal Shields
- Conference: Independent
- Record: 6–3
- Head coach: Hal Shields (3rd season)
- Home stadium: Robinson Field

1938 Midwestern college football independents records
| | Conf. | | | Overall |
| Team | W | L | T | W | | L | | T |
|---|---|---|---|---|---|---|---|---|
| No. 5 Notre Dame | | – | | 8 | – | 1 | – | 0 |
| Central Michigan | | – | | 7 | – | 1 | – | 0 |
| Michigan State Normal | | – | | 6 | – | 1 | – | 1 |
| Xavier | | – | | 7 | – | 2 | – | 0 |
| Akron | | – | | 6 | – | 3 | – | 0 |
| Michigan State | | – | | 6 | – | 3 | – | 0 |
| Detroit Tech | | – | | 6 | – | 3 | – | 0 |
| Detroit | | – | | 6 | – | 4 | – | 0 |
| Western State Teachers | | – | | 4 | – | 3 | – | 0 |
| Cincinnati | | – | | 4 | – | 5 | – | 0 |
| Haskell | | – | | 2 | – | 6 | – | 0 |
| Wayne | | – | | 2 | – | 6 | – | 0 |
| DePaul | | – | | 2 | – | 7 | – | 0 |
| Michigan Tech | | – | | 1 | – | 5 | – | 0 |
| Marquette | | – | | 1 | – | 7 | – | 0 |
Rankings from AP poll

The 1938 Detroit Tech Dynamics football team represented the Detroit Institute of Technology as an independent during the 1938 college football season. In their third year under head coach Hal Shields, the Dynamics compiled a 6–3 record and outscored opponents by a total of 321 to 64. The team's schedule was considered the toughest in the school's history.

== Schedule ==
| Date | Opponent | Site | Result | Attendance | Source |
|---|---|---|---|---|---|
| September 23 | at John Carroll | Municipal Stadium; Cleveland, OH | L 0–19 | 8,000 | |
| October 1 | Defiance | Robinson Field; Detroit, MI | W 64–0 | | |
| October 8 | at Ferris Institute | Big Rapids, MI | W 47–0 | | |
| October 15 | at Michigan Tech | Houghton, MI | W 65–0 | | |
| October 22 | Grand Rapids | Robinson Field; Detroit, MI | W 47–0 | 2,500 | |
| October 29 | at Denison | Granville, OH | L 0–19 | | |
| November 5 | at Heidelberg | Tiffin, OH | W 54–0 | | |
| November 12 | Illinois College | Robinson Field; Detroit, MI | W 44–7 | | |
| November 19 | Youngstown | Robinson Field; Detroit, MI | L 0–19 | | |
