= 1938 Cincinnati Bearcats football team =

American college football season

1938 Cincinnati Bearcats football
- Conference: Independent
- Record: 4–5
- Head coach: Joseph A. Meyer (1st season)
- Captain: Harry Shelby
- Home stadium: Nippert Stadium

1938 Midwestern college football independents records
	Conf.			Overall
Team	W	L	T	W		L		T
No. 5 Notre Dame		–		8	–	1	–	0
Central Michigan		–		7	–	1	–	0
Michigan State Normal		–		6	–	1	–	1
Xavier		–		7	–	2	–	0
Akron		–		6	–	3	–	0
Michigan State		–		6	–	3	–	0
Detroit Tech		–		6	–	3	–	0
Detroit		–		6	–	4	–	0
Western State Teachers		–		4	–	3	–	0
Cincinnati		–		4	–	5	–	0
Haskell		–		2	–	6	–	0
Wayne		–		2	–	6	–	0
DePaul		–		2	–	7	–	0
Michigan Tech		–		1	–	5	–	0
Marquette		–		1	–	7	–	0
Rankings from AP poll

The 1938 Cincinnati Bearcats football team was an American football team that represented the University of Cincinnati as an independent during the 1938 college football season. The Bearcats were led by first-year head coach Joseph A. Meyer and compiled a 4–5 record.

== Schedule ==
Date	Opponent	Site	Result	Attendance	Source
September 24	Louisville	Nippert Stadium; Cincinnati, OH (rivalry)	W 19–9	8,500	
October 1	Illinois Wesleyan	Nippert Stadium; Cincinnati, OH	W 6–0		
October 8	Dayton	Nippert Stadium; Cincinnati, OH	L 6–26		
October 14	at Tampa	Phillips Field; Tampa, FL	W 7–6	3,000	
October 22	Western Reserve	Nippert Stadium; Cincinnati, OH	L 0–33		
October 29	at Ohio	Peden Stadium; Athens, OH	L 12–13		
November 5	Ohio Wesleyan^{†}	Nippert Stadium; Cincinnati, OH	W 14–7		
November 12	Marshall	Nippert Stadium; Cincinnati, OH	L 9–27		
November 24	Miami (OH)	Nippert Stadium; Cincinnati, OH (Victory Bell)	L 7–16	10,000	
^{†}Homecoming
