= 1938 Xavier Musketeers football team =

American college football season

1938 Xavier Musketeers football
- Conference: Independent
- Record: 7–2
- Head coach: Clem Crowe (4th season)
- Home stadium: Xavier Stadium

1938 Midwestern college football independents records
	Conf.			Overall
Team	W	L	T	W		L		T
No. 5 Notre Dame		–		8	–	1	–	0
Central Michigan		–		7	–	1	–	0
Michigan State Normal		–		6	–	1	–	1
Xavier		–		7	–	2	–	0
Akron		–		6	–	3	–	0
Michigan State		–		6	–	3	–	0
Detroit Tech		–		6	–	3	–	0
Detroit		–		6	–	4	–	0
Western State Teachers		–		4	–	3	–	0
Cincinnati		–		4	–	5	–	0
Haskell		–		2	–	6	–	0
Wayne		–		2	–	6	–	0
DePaul		–		2	–	7	–	0
Michigan Tech		–		1	–	5	–	0
Marquette		–		1	–	7	–	0
Rankings from AP poll

The 1938 Xavier Musketeers football team was an American football team that represented Xavier University as an independent during the 1938 college football season. In its fourth season under head coach Clem Crowe, the team compiled a 7–2 record and outscored opponents by a total of 200 to 47. The team played its home games at Xavier Stadium in Cincinnati.

== Schedule ==
Date	Opponent	Site	Result	Attendance	Source
September 24	South Carolina	Xavier Stadium; Cincinnati, OH	L 0–6	4,000	
September 30	Ohio	Xavier Stadium; Cincinnati, OH	L 12–14		
October 8	at Akron	Buchtel Field; Akron, OH	W 38–0		
October 15	Transylvania	Xavier Stadium; Cincinnati, OH	W 52–6	2,000	
October 22	Kentucky	Xavier Stadium; Cincinnati, OH	W 26–7	9,000	
October 30	Providence	Xavier Stadium; Cincinnati, OH	W 33–7	12,000	
November 5	at Dayton	UD Stadium; Dayton, OH	W 14–7	10,506	
November 19	Baldwin Wallace	Xavier Stadium; Cincinnati, OH	W 12–0		
November 24	Toledo	Xavier Stadium; Cincinnati, OH	W 13–0	7,000	
