= 1938 Haskell Indians football team =

American college football season

1938 Haskell Indians football
- Conference: Independent
- Record: 2–6
- Head coach: Jack Carmody (3rd season)
- Home stadium: Haskell Stadium

1938 Midwestern college football independents records
	Conf.			Overall
Team	W	L	T	W		L		T
No. 5 Notre Dame		–		8	–	1	–	0
Central Michigan		–		7	–	1	–	0
Michigan State Normal		–		6	–	1	–	1
Xavier		–		7	–	2	–	0
Akron		–		6	–	3	–	0
Michigan State		–		6	–	3	–	0
Detroit Tech		–		6	–	3	–	0
Detroit		–		6	–	4	–	0
Western State Teachers		–		4	–	3	–	0
Cincinnati		–		4	–	5	–	0
Haskell		–		2	–	6	–	0
Wayne		–		2	–	6	–	0
DePaul		–		2	–	7	–	0
Michigan Tech		–		1	–	5	–	0
Marquette		–		1	–	7	–	0
Rankings from AP poll

The 1938 Haskell Indians football team was an American football that represented the Haskell Institute—now known as Haskell Indian Nations University—as an independent during the 1938 college football season. Led by third-year head coach Jack Carmody, Haskell compiled a record of 2–6.

== Schedule ==
Date	Opponent	Site	Result	Source
September 23	at McPherson	McPherson, KS	W 3–0	
September 30	at Ottawa (KS)	Ottawa, KS	L 0–14	
October 7	at Sterling	Sterling, KS	L 9–14	
October 14	Kemper	Haskell Stadium; Lawrence, KS	L 6–19	
October 21	Midland	Lawrence, KS	L 6–34	
October 28	at Baker	Baker grounds; Baldwin City, KS	L 7–19	
November 4	Bethel (KS)		L 3–25	
November 11	at Central (MO)	Fayette, MO	W 12–7	
