= 1938 Michigan State Spartans football team =

American college football season

1938 Michigan State Spartans football
- Conference: Independent
- Record: 6–3
- Head coach: Charlie Bachman (6th season)
- Offensive scheme: Notre Dame Box
- MVP: John Pingel
- Captains: Allen O. Diebold; Dave Diehl
- Home stadium: Macklin Field

1938 Midwestern college football independents records
	Conf.			Overall
Team	W	L	T	W		L		T
No. 5 Notre Dame		–		8	–	1	–	0
Central Michigan		–		7	–	1	–	0
Michigan State Normal		–		6	–	1	–	1
Xavier		–		7	–	2	–	0
Akron		–		6	–	3	–	0
Michigan State		–		6	–	3	–	0
Detroit Tech		–		6	–	3	–	0
Detroit		–		6	–	4	–	0
Western State Teachers		–		4	–	3	–	0
Cincinnati		–		4	–	5	–	0
Haskell		–		2	–	6	–	0
Wayne		–		2	–	6	–	0
DePaul		–		2	–	7	–	0
Michigan Tech		–		1	–	5	–	0
Marquette		–		1	–	7	–	0
Rankings from AP poll

The 1938 Michigan State Spartans football team represented Michigan State College as an independent during the 1938 college football season. In their sixth season under head coach Charlie Bachman, the Spartans compiled a 6–3 record and lost their annual rivalry game with Michigan by a 14 to 0 score. In inter-sectional play, the team defeated West Virginia (26–0), Syracuse (19–12), and Temple (10–0), and lost to Santa Clara (7–6).

Halfback John Pingel was selected by the Associated Press (AP), International News Service (INS) and Detroit Times as a first-team player, on the 1938 College Football All-America Team. Pingel was later inducted into the College Football Hall of Fame.

== Schedule ==
Date	Opponent	Site	Result	Attendance	Source
September 24	Wayne	Macklin Field; East Lansing, MI	W 34–6	22,000	
October 1	at Michigan	Michigan Stadium; Ann Arbor, MI (rivalry)	L 0–14	82,500	
October 8	Illinois Wesleyan	Macklin Field; East Lansing, MI	W 18–0	12,000	
October 15	at West Virginia	Mountaineer Field; Morgantown, WV	W 26–0	9,000	
October 22	Syracuse^{†}	Macklin Field; East Lansing, MI	W 19–12	18,000	
October 29	Santa Clara	Macklin Field; East Lansing, MI	L 6–7	21,000	
November 5	at Missouri	Memorial Stadium; Columbia, MO	L 0–6	10,000	
November 12	at Marquette	Marquette Stadium; Milwaukee, WI	W 20–14	13,000	
November 19	Temple	Macklin Field; East Lansing, MI	W 10–0	12,000	
^{†}Homecoming

== Game summaries ==
=== Michigan ===
Michigan State at Michigan

Team	1	2	3	4	Total
Michigan State	0	0	0	0	0
• Michigan	0	7	0	7	14

- Date: October 1, 1938
- Location: Michigan Stadium
  Ann Arbor, MI
- Game attendance: 82,500
- Referee: J. S. Getschell (St. Thomas)

On October 1, 1938, the Spartans lost to Michigan by a 14 to 0 score. The game, the 33rd between the two programs, was played at Michigan Stadium before 82,500 spectators. Sophomore halfback Paul Kromer, appearing in his first game for the Wolverines, scored both touchdowns. Michigan's first points were scored after Fred Trosko intercepted a John Pingel pass at the end of the first quarter, giving Michigan possession at the Spartans' 47-yard line. Kromer scored the touchdown on fourth down from the two-yard line. Michigan's second touchdown was also set up by an interception, with Norm Purucker intercepting a Pingel pass. Kromer again scored on a two-yard run.
