= Michigan Tech Huskies football, 1930–1939 =

American college football seasons

1930–1939 Michigan Tech Huskies football
- Conference: Independent
- Head coach: Bert Noblet (1929–1935); Don Sherman (1936–1942)

The Michigan Tech Huskies football program, 1930–1939 represented the Michigan College of Mines and Technology (now known as Michigan Technological University) as an independent team during the 1930s.

Bert Noblet was the head football coach from 1929 to 1935. He also coached the school's ice hockey team and was a professor of forestry.

Don Sherman was the head football coach from 1936 to 1942. He was also the school's athletic director and a professor of economics.

== 1930 ==
1930 Michigan Tech Huskies football
- Conference: Independent
- Record: 1–5
- Head coach: Bert Noblet (2nd season)
- Home stadium: Engineer's field

1930 Midwestern college football independents records
	Conf.			Overall
Team	W	L	T	W		L		T
No. 1 Notre Dame		–		10	–	0	–	0
Marquette		–		8	–	0	–	1
Haskell		–		9	–	1	–	0
Michigan State		–		5	–	1	–	2
DePaul		–		4	–	2	–	1
Detroit		–		5	–	3	–	2
Kent State		–		3	–	3	–	1
Saint Louis		–		3	–	3	–	2
John Carroll		–		3	–	5	–	2
Loyola (IL)		–		2	–	6	–	1
Michigan Tech		–		1	–	5	–	0
Rankings from Dickinson System

The 1930 Michigan Tech Huskies football team represented Michigan Technological University as an independent in the 1930 college football season. Led by second-year head coach Bert Noblet, the Huskies compiled a record of 1–5.

=== Schedule ===
Date	Opponent	Site	Result	Source
October 4	Superior State	Houghton, MI	L 0–35	
October 11	at Northland (WI)	Ashland, WI	L 6–12	
October 18	at Northern State Teachers (MI)	Marquette, MI	L 0–18	
October 25	Duluth	Engineer's field; Houghton, MI	W 14–6	
November 1	Northern State Teachers (MI)^{†}		L 0–26	
November 11	at Billings Polytechnic	Billings, MT	L 7–13	
^{†}Homecoming

== 1931 ==
1931 Michigan Tech Huskies football
- Conference: Independent
- Record: 3–2
- Head coach: Bert Noblet (3rd season)
- Home stadium: Hubbell Field

1931 Midwestern college football independents records
	Conf.			Overall
Team	W	L	T	W		L		T
Wilberforce		–		8	–	0	–	0
Marquette		–		8	–	1	–	0
Saint Louis		–		8	–	1	–	0
Detroit		–		7	–	2	–	1
Western State Teachers		–		5	–	2	–	0
No. 11 Notre Dame		–		6	–	2	–	1
DePaul		–		6	–	3	–	0
Michigan State		–		5	–	3	–	1
Haskell		–		6	–	4	–	0
Michigan Tech		–		3	–	2	–	0
Michigan State Normal		–		3	–	2	–	1
Central State (MI)		–		4	–	3	–	0
John Carroll		–		4	–	4	–	2
Wittenberg		–		3	–	3	–	3
Kent State		–		3	–	4	–	0
Rankings from Dickinson System

The 1931 Michigan Tech Huskies football team represented Michigan Technological University as an independent during the 1931 college football season. The Huskies completed the season with a 3–2 record.

=== Schedule ===
Date	Opponent	Site	Result	Source
October 2	Superior State		L 0–43	
October 10	Northland (WI)		L 0–6	
October 17	Northern State Teachers (MI)		W 18–7	
October 31	at Northern State Teachers (MI)	Marquette, MI	W 7–0	
November 7	Legion All-Stars		W 38–0	

== 1932 ==
1932 Michigan Tech Huskies football
- Conference: Independent
- Record: 4–1
- Head coach: Bert Noblet (4th season)
- Home stadium: Hubbell Field

1932 Midwestern college football independents records
	Conf.			Overall
Team	W	L	T	W		L		T
Western State Teachers		–		6	–	0	–	1
Michigan State		–		7	–	1	–	0
Western Reserve		–		7	–	1	–	0
Detroit		–		8	–	2	–	0
Michigan Tech		–		4	–	1	–	0
No. 7 Notre Dame		–		7	–	2	–	0
DePaul		–		5	–	1	–	2
Michigan State Normal		–		5	–	2	–	0
Saint Louis		–		5	–	2	–	0
Marquette		–		4	–	3	–	1
Bowling Green		–		3	–	3	–	1
Central State (MI)		–		3	–	4	–	1
Haskell		–		2	–	5	–	1
Detroit City		–		1	–	6	–	0

The 1932 Michigan Tech Huskies football team represented Michigan Technological University as an independent during the 1932 college football season. The Huskies completed the season with a 4–1 record.

=== Schedule ===
Date	Opponent	Site	Result	Source
October 1	Copper Motor All-Stars		W 7–0	
October 8	at Northland (WI)	Ashland, WI	L 0–6	
October 15	Northern State Teachers (MI)		W 12–0	
October 22	Army Flyers	Houghton, MI	W 13–0	
October 29	at Northern State Teachers (MI)	Marquette, MI	W 6–0	

== 1933 ==
1933 Michigan Tech Huskies football
- Conference: Independent
- Record: 2–2
- Head coach: Bert Noblet (5th season)
- Home stadium: Hubbell Field

1933 Midwestern college football independents records
	Conf.			Overall
Team	W	L	T	W		L		T
DePaul		–		6	–	0	–	1
Detroit		–		7	–	1	–	0
Michigan State Normal		–		5	–	2	–	0
Saint Louis		–		6	–	3	–	0
Central State (MI)		–		5	–	2	–	1
Michigan State		–		4	–	2	–	2
Missouri Mines		–		4	–	3	–	0
Michigan Tech		–		2	–	2	–	0
Western State Teachers		–		3	–	3	–	1
Marquette		–		3	–	4	–	1
Notre Dame		–		3	–	5	–	1
Haskell		–		2	–	6	–	3
Detroit City		–		2	–	5	–	1

The 1933 Michigan Tech Huskies football team represented Michigan Technological University in the 1933 college football season. The Huskies completed the season with a 2–2 record.

=== Schedule ===
Date	Opponent	Site	Result
October 7	Northland (WI)		L 0–7
October 14	Northern State Normal (MI)		W 27–0
October 21	Jordan (MI)		L 6–15
October 28	Northern State Normal (MI)		W 7–0

== 1934 ==
1934 Michigan Tech Huskies football
- Conference: Independent
- Record: 1–2–1
- Head coach: Bert Noblet (6th season)

1934 Midwestern college football independents records
	Conf.			Overall
Team	W	L	T	W		L		T
Michigan State		–		8	–	1	–	0
Wayne		–		7	–	1	–	0
Western State Teachers (MI)		–		7	–	1	–	0
Michigan State Normal		–		5	–	2	–	0
Notre Dame		–		6	–	3	–	0
Central State (MI)		–		5	–	3	–	0
Detroit		–		5	–	3	–	1
DePaul		–		4	–	3	–	0
Saint Louis		–		3	–	3	–	2
Marquette		–		4	–	5	–	0
Michigan Tech		–		1	–	2	–	1
Haskell		–		3	–	6	–	1
Missouri Mines		–		2	–	6	–	0
Wittenberg		–		2	–	7	–	0

The 1934 Michigan Tech Huskies football team represented the Michigan College of Mines and Technology (now known as Michigan Technological University) as an independent during the 1934 college football season. In their sixth year under head coach Bert Noblet, the team compiled a 1–2–1 record.

=== Schedule ===
Date	Opponent	Site	Result	Source
October 6	at St. Norbert	Legion Park; De Pere, WI	T 0–0	
October 13	Northern State Teachers		L 0–6	
October 20	Jordan (MI)	Houghton, MI	L 0–6	
October 27	Northern State Teachers		W 9–0	

== 1935 ==
1935 Michigan Tech Huskies football
- Conference: Independent
- Record: 2–2–1
- Head coach: Bert Noblet (7th season)

1935 Midwestern college football independents records
	Conf.			Overall
Team	W	L	T	W		L		T
No. 23 Marquette		–		7	–	1	–	0
No. 8 Notre Dame		–		7	–	1	–	1
Michigan State		–		6	–	2	–	0
DePaul		–		5	–	2	–	1
Wayne		–		5	–	2	–	1
Detroit		–		6	–	3	–	0
Xavier		–		6	–	3	–	0
Michigan State Normal		–		4	–	2	–	2
Western State Teachers		–		5	–	3	–	0
Michigan Tech		–		2	–	2	–	1
Saint Louis		–		5	–	6	–	0
Central State (MI)		–		1	–	6	–	0
Haskell		–		0	–	7	–	1
Rankings from United Press

The 1935 Michigan Tech Huskies football team represented the Michigan College of Mines and Technology (now known as Michigan Technological University) as an independent during the 1935 college football season. In their seventh and final year under head coach Bert Noblet, the team compiled a 2–2–1 record.

=== Schedule ===
Date	Opponent	Site	Result	Source
October 5	St. Norbert		L 0–13	
October 12	Northern State Teachers	Houghton, MI	T 12–12	
October 19	Jordan (MI)		L 7–10	
October 26	at Northern State Teachers	Marquette, MI	W 18–0	
November 2	Northland (WI)	Houghton, MI	W 39–7	

== 1936 ==
1936 Michigan Tech Huskies football
- Conference: Independent
- Record: 2–3
- Head coach: Don Sherman (1st season)

1936 Midwestern college football independents records
	Conf.			Overall
Team	W	L	T	W		L		T
DePaul		–		7	–	2	–	0
No. 20 Marquette		–		7	–	2	–	0
Michigan State		–		6	–	1	–	2
Michigan State Normal		–		6	–	2	–	0
No. 8 Notre Dame		–		6	–	2	–	1
Wayne		–		5	–	2	–	1
Detroit		–		7	–	3	–	0
Xavier		–		6	–	4	–	0
Saint Louis		–		5	–	4	–	1
Central Michigan		–		3	–	4	–	1
Michigan Tech		–		2	–	3	–	0
Western State Teachers		–		2	–	5	–	0
Haskell		–		1	–	6	–	1
Rankings from AP Poll

The 1936 Michigan Tech Huskies football team represented the Michigan College of Mines and Technology (now known as Michigan Technological University) as an independent during the 1936 college football season. In their first year under head coach Don Sherman, the team compiled a 2–3 record.

=== Schedule ===
Date	Opponent	Site	Result	Source
October 3	St. Norbert	Houghton, MI	L 0–46	
October 10	at Northern State Teachers	Marquette, MI	L 6–13	
October 24	Northern State Teachers	Houghton, MI	W 12–6	
October 31	at Northland (WI)	Ashland, WI	W 7–6	
November 7	Lawrence Tech		W 6–0	

== 1937 ==
1937 Michigan Tech Huskies football
- Conference: Independent
- Record: 4–3
- Head coach: Don Sherman (2nd season)

1937 Midwestern college football independents records
	Conf.			Overall
Team	W	L	T	W		L		T
Michigan State		–		8	–	2	–	0
Akron		–		7	–	2	–	0
Central Michigan		–		6	–	2	–	0
DePaul		–		5	–	1	–	2
Wayne		–		6	–	2	–	0
No. T–9 Notre Dame		–		6	–	2	–	1
Detroit		–		7	–	3	–	0
Michigan State Normal		–		5	–	2	–	1
Western State Teachers		–		5	–	3	–	0
Michigan Tech		–		4	–	3	–	0
Xavier		–		4	–	5	–	1
Marquette		–		3	–	6	–	0
Haskell		–		2	–	7	–	0
Rankings from AP Poll

The 1937 Michigan Tech Huskies football team represented the Michigan College of Mines and Technology (now known as Michigan Technological University) as an independent during the 1937 college football season. In their second year under head coach Don Sherman, the team compiled a 4-3 record.

=== Schedule ===
Date	Opponent	Site	Result	Source
October 2	Northland (WI)	Houghton, MI	W 19–3	
October 9	Lawrence Tech	Houghton, MI	W 14–0	
October 16	Northern State Teachers^{†}	Houghton, MI	W 7–6	
October 23	at Northern State Teachers	Marquette, MI	L 0–9	
October 30	at River Falls State	River Falls, WI	L 0–9	
November 6	at Detroit Tech	Robinson Field; Detroit, MI	W 6–0	
November 13	St. Norbert	Legion Park; De Pere, WI	L 0–33	
^{†}Homecoming

== 1938 ==
1938 Michigan Tech Huskies football
- Conference: Independent
- Record: 1–5
- Head coach: Don Sherman (3rd season)

1938 Midwestern college football independents records
	Conf.			Overall
Team	W	L	T	W		L		T
No. 5 Notre Dame		–		8	–	1	–	0
Central Michigan		–		7	–	1	–	0
Michigan State Normal		–		6	–	1	–	1
Xavier		–		7	–	2	–	0
Akron		–		6	–	3	–	0
Michigan State		–		6	–	3	–	0
Detroit Tech		–		6	–	3	–	0
Detroit		–		6	–	4	–	0
Western State Teachers		–		4	–	3	–	0
Cincinnati		–		4	–	5	–	0
Haskell		–		2	–	6	–	0
Wayne		–		2	–	6	–	0
DePaul		–		2	–	7	–	0
Michigan Tech		–		1	–	5	–	0
Marquette		–		1	–	7	–	0
Rankings from AP poll

The 1938 Michigan Tech Huskies football team, also sometimes referred to as the Michigan Tech Engineers, represented the Michigan College of Mines and Technology (now known as Michigan Technological University) as an independent during the 1938 college football season. In their third year under head coach Don Sherman, the team compiled a 1–5 record.

=== Schedule ===
Date	Opponent	Site	Result	Source
October 1	St. Norbert	Houghton, MI	L 0–13	
October 8	at Northland (WI)	Ashland, WI	L 0–14	
October 15	Detroit Tech	Houghton, MI	L 0–65	
October 22	at Northern State Teachers	Marquette, MI	L 0–13	
October 29	River Falls State	Houghton, MI	L 0–32	
November 5	Northern State Teachers	Houghton, MI	W 27–3	

== 1939 ==
1939 Michigan Tech Huskies football
- Conference: Independent
- Record: 3–1–1
- Head coach: Don Sherman (4th season)
- Home stadium: Engineers field

1939 Midwestern college football independents records
	Conf.			Overall
Team	W	L	T	W		L		T
Central Michigan		–		8	–	1	–	0
No. 13 Notre Dame		–		7	–	2	–	0
Michigan Tech		–		3	–	1	–	1
Ohio		–		6	–	3	–	0
Detroit		–		5	–	3	–	1
Akron		–		5	–	4	–	0
Cincinnati		–		4	–	3	–	2
Ohio Wesleyan		–		5	–	4	–	1
Marquette		–		4	–	4	–	0
Michigan State		–		4	–	4	–	1
Dayton		–		4	–	4	–	1
Michigan State Normal		–		3	–	3	–	1
Wayne		–		4	–	5	–	0
Xavier		–		3	–	5	–	1
Western State Teachers		–		2	–	6	–	1
Miami (OH)		–		1	–	7	–	1
Rankings from AP Poll

The 1939 Michigan Tech Huskies football team, also sometimes referred to as the Michigan Tech Engineers, represented the Michigan College of Mines and Technology (now known as Michigan Technological University) as an independent during the 1939 college football season. In their fourth year under head coach Don Sherman, the team compiled a 3–1–1 record.

=== Schedule ===
Date	Time	Opponent	Site	Result	Attendance	Source
October 8		Northland (WI)	Houghton, MI	W 21–0		
October 14		Northern State Teachers^{†}	Engineers field; Houghton, MI	W 7–6	> 1,500	
October 21		at St. Norbert	J. R. Minahan Stadium; De Pere, WI	L 0–20		
October 28		at Northern State Teachers	Marquette, MI	T 0–0		
November 4	2:00 p.m.	at Grand Rapids	Godwin Heights field; Grand Rapids, MI	W 12–0		
^{†}Homecoming; All times are in Central time
