= Wayne Tartars football, 1930–1939 =

American college football seasons

The Wayne Tartars football teams (later known as the Wayne State Tartars) represented Wayne University (known as Detroit City College prior to 1934 later renamed Wayne State University) in American football from 1930 to 1939.

Highlights of the 1930s include the following:

- David L. Holmes stepped down as the school's head football coach after the 1928 season. He remained with the school as athletic director and track coach for several decades thereafter.
- After Holmes' departure, the teams failed to win a game in 1930 (0–9) and 1931 (0–6–1) under head coach Norman G. Wann.
- In 1932, Joe Gembis took over as head coach. He served 14 years as head coach, compiling a 42–51–8 record.

== 1930 ==
1930 Detroit City College Tartars football
- Conference: Michigan Collegiate Conference
- Record: 0–9 (0–3 MCC)
- Head coach: Norman G. Wann (2nd season)

1930 Michigan Collegiate Conference football standings
	Conf.					Overall
Team	W		L		T	W		L		T
Michigan State Normal $	3	–	0	–	0	6	–	1	–	0
Western State Teachers	2	–	1	–	0	5	–	1	–	1
Central State (MI)	1	–	2	–	0	6	–	2	–	0
Detroit City College	0	–	3	–	0	0	–	9	–	0
$ – Conference champion

The 1930 Detroit City College Tartars football team represented Detroit City College (later renamed Wayne State University) in the Michigan Collegiate Conference during the 1930 college football season. In its second season under head coach Norman G. Wann, the team compiled a 0–9 record.

=== Schedule ===
Date	Opponent	Site	Result	Source
October 4	Notre Dame "B"*	Detroit, MI	L 0–51	
October 11	at Michigan State Normal	Ypsilanti, MI	L 6–33	
October 18	at Hillsdale*	Hillsdale, MI	L 12–13	
October 25	Western State Teachers	Roosevelt Field; Detroit, MI	L 0–52	
November 1	at West Liberty*		L 0–39	
November 8	at Findlay*	Findlay, OH	L 12–32	
November 15	Bowling Green*	Detroit, MI	L 7–19	
November 22	at Toledo*	Detroit, MI	L 0–18	
November 27	Central State (MI)	Detroit, MI	L 0–13	
*Non-conference game

== 1931 ==
1931 Detroit City College Tartars football
- Conference: Independent
- Record: 0–6–1
- Head coach: Norman G. Wann (3rd season)
- Home stadium: Kelsey Field

1931 Midwestern college football independents records
	Conf.			Overall
Team	W	L	T	W		L		T
Wilberforce		–		8	–	0	–	0
Marquette		–		8	–	1	–	0
Saint Louis		–		8	–	1	–	0
Detroit		–		7	–	2	–	1
Western State Teachers		–		5	–	2	–	0
No. 11 Notre Dame		–		6	–	2	–	1
DePaul		–		6	–	3	–	0
Michigan State		–		5	–	3	–	1
Haskell		–		6	–	4	–	0
Michigan Tech		–		3	–	2	–	0
Michigan State Normal		–		3	–	2	–	1
Central State (MI)		–		4	–	3	–	0
John Carroll		–		4	–	4	–	2
Wittenberg		–		3	–	3	–	3
Kent State		–		3	–	4	–	0
Rankings from Dickinson System

The 1931 Detroit City College Tartars football team represented Detroit City College (later renamed Wayne State University) as an independent during the 1931 college football season. In its third and final season under head coach Norman G. Wann, the team compiled a 0–6–1 record.

In January 1932, Sy Berent, a member of the team, led a petition drive in support of coach Norman Wann. The petition asserted that the team's mediocre performance in recent years was the result of high academic standards, the school's lack of appeal as an athletic center, and "indifference and lack of support by the student body." Wann was nevertheless replaced as the head football coach by Joe Gembis. Wann remained on the school's faculty as a teacher of physical education.

=== Schedule ===
Date	Opponent	Site	Result	Source
October 3	Albion	Lysander Field; Detroit, MI	L 0–6	
October 16	at Bowling Green	Bowling Green, OH	L 0–13	
October 24	Findlay	Kelsey Field; Detroit, MI	L 0–13	
October 31	at Central State (MI)	Alumni Field; Mount Pleasant, MI	L 0–42	
November 7	Defiance	Kelsey Field; Detroit, MI	L 7–26	
November 14	Olivet	Kelsey Field; Detroit, MI	L 0–32	
November 21	Wilmington (OH)	Detroit, MI	T 0–0	

== 1932 ==
1932 Detroit City College Tartars football
- Conference: Independent
- Record: 1–6
- Head coach: Joe Gembis (1st season)
- Captain: Clarence Mumma
- Home stadium: Kelsey Field

1932 Midwestern college football independents records
	Conf.			Overall
Team	W	L	T	W		L		T
Western State Teachers		–		6	–	0	–	1
Michigan State		–		7	–	1	–	0
Western Reserve		–		7	–	1	–	0
Detroit		–		8	–	2	–	0
Michigan Tech		–		4	–	1	–	0
No. 7 Notre Dame		–		7	–	2	–	0
DePaul		–		5	–	1	–	2
Michigan State Normal		–		5	–	2	–	0
Saint Louis		–		5	–	2	–	0
Marquette		–		4	–	3	–	1
Bowling Green		–		3	–	3	–	1
Central State (MI)		–		3	–	4	–	1
Haskell		–		2	–	5	–	1
Detroit City		–		1	–	6	–	0

The 1932 Detroit City College Tartars football team represented Detroit City College (later renamed Wayne State University) as an independent during the 1932 college football season. The team compiled a 1–6 record and was outscored by its opponents by a combined total of 95 to 10.

Joe Gembis was hired as the team's head coach in July 1932. He succeeded Norman Wann as head coach. Gembis, a native of Vicksburg, Michigan, had played fullback for the Michigan Wolverines football team from 1927 to 1929; he coached Chesapeake High School in Chesapeake, Ohio, to a 14-4 record in 1931. Gembis agreed to coach the Detroit City College team in exchange for post graduate work.

On October 8, the Tartars defeated Toledo, 3–0, for their only victory of the 1932 season. Dan Dobbins, a substitute halfback, kicked a field goal in the last eight seconds.

During Gembis' 14-year tenure as the school's head football coach, the team began playing a higher caliber of opponents, including regular games against regular Michigan State, the University of Detroit, Central Michigan, Western Michigan, Eastern Michigan, Cincinnati, and Bowling Green. Gembis compiled an overall record of 42–51–8 at Detroit City College/Wayne University.

=== Schedule ===
Date	Opponent	Site	Result	Source
September 30	at Albion	Albion, MI	L 0–7	
October 8	at Toledo	Toledo, OH	W 3–0	
October 15	Valparaiso	Kelsey Field; Detroit, MI	L 0–27	
October 29	Central State (MI)	Kelsey Field; Detroit, MI	L 0–13	
November 5	Kalamazoo	Kelsey Field; Detroit, MI	L 0–3	
November 11	at Hope	Holland, MI	L 0–32	
November 19	Defiance	Kelsey Field; Detroit, MI	L 7–13	

== 1933 ==
1933 Detroit City College Tartars football
- Conference: Independent
- Record: 2–5–1
- Head coach: Joe Gembis (2nd season)
- Captain: None
- Home stadium: Kelsey Field

1933 Midwestern college football independents records
	Conf.			Overall
Team	W	L	T	W		L		T
DePaul		–		6	–	0	–	1
Detroit		–		7	–	1	–	0
Michigan State Normal		–		5	–	2	–	0
Saint Louis		–		6	–	3	–	0
Central State (MI)		–		5	–	2	–	1
Michigan State		–		4	–	2	–	2
Missouri Mines		–		4	–	3	–	0
Michigan Tech		–		2	–	2	–	0
Western State Teachers		–		3	–	3	–	1
Marquette		–		3	–	4	–	1
Notre Dame		–		3	–	5	–	1
Haskell		–		2	–	6	–	3
Detroit City		–		2	–	5	–	1

The 1933 Detroit City College Tartars football team represented Detroit City College (later renamed Wayne State University) as an independent during the 1933 college football season. In their second year under head coach Joe Gembis, the Tartars compiled a 2–5–1 record and were outscored opponents by a combined total of 130 to 56.

=== Schedule ===
Date	Opponent	Site	Result	Source
September 29	at Wittenberg	Springfield, OH	L 0–33	
October 7	Toledo	Kelsey Field; Detroit, MI	T 0–0	
October 14	at Findlay	Findlay, OH	L 7–12	
October 20	at Kalamazoo	Kalamazoo, MI	L 6–20	
October 28	at Central State (MI)	Alumni Field; Mount Pleasant, MI	L 14–26	
November 4	Hope	Kelsey Field; Detroit, MI	W 3–0	
November 11	Valparaiso	Valparaiso, IN	L 0–33	
November 18	Defiance	Kelsey Field; Detroit, MI	W 26–6	

== 1934 ==
1934 Wayne Tartars football
- Conference: Independent
- Record: 7–1
- Head coach: Joe Gembis (3rd season)
- Captain: None
- Home stadium: Kelsey Field

1934 Midwestern college football independents records
	Conf.			Overall
Team	W	L	T	W		L		T
Michigan State		–		8	–	1	–	0
Wayne		–		7	–	1	–	0
Western State Teachers (MI)		–		7	–	1	–	0
Michigan State Normal		–		5	–	2	–	0
Notre Dame		–		6	–	3	–	0
Central State (MI)		–		5	–	3	–	0
Detroit		–		5	–	3	–	1
DePaul		–		4	–	3	–	0
Saint Louis		–		3	–	3	–	2
Marquette		–		4	–	5	–	0
Michigan Tech		–		1	–	2	–	1
Haskell		–		3	–	6	–	1
Missouri Mines		–		2	–	6	–	0
Wittenberg		–		2	–	7	–	0

The 1934 Wayne Tartars football team represented Wayne University (later renamed Wayne State University) as an independent during the 1934 college football season. In their third year under head coach Joe Gembis, the Tartars compiled a 7–1 record, shut out five of eight opponents, and outscored all opponents by a combined total of 179 to 26. Jimmy Demaree was the quarterback and star player.

=== Schedule ===
Date	Opponent	Site	Result	Attendance	Source
September 29	St. Mary's (MI)	Kelsey Field; Detroit, MI	W 51–0		
October 6	Assumption (ON)	Kelsey Field; Detroit, MI	W 37–0		
October 13	Alma	Kelsey Field; Detroit, MI	W 20–0		
October 20	at Hillsdale	Hillsdale, MI	W 6–0		
October 27	Central State (MI)	Kelsey Field; Detroit, MI	L 7–13		
November 2	at Kalamazoo	Kalamazoo, MI	W 13–6		
November 10	at Hope	Holland, MI	W 12–7		
November 17	Albion	Kelsey Field; Detroit, MI	W 33–0	4,000	

== 1935 ==
1935 Wayne Tartars football
- Conference: Independent
- Record: 5–2–1
- Head coach: Joe Gembis (4th season)
- Captain: Fred Bens
- Home stadium: Kelsey Field

1935 Midwestern college football independents records
	Conf.			Overall
Team	W	L	T	W		L		T
No. 23 Marquette		–		7	–	1	–	0
No. 8 Notre Dame		–		7	–	1	–	1
Michigan State		–		6	–	2	–	0
DePaul		–		5	–	2	–	1
Wayne		–		5	–	2	–	1
Detroit		–		6	–	3	–	0
Xavier		–		6	–	3	–	0
Michigan State Normal		–		4	–	2	–	2
Western State Teachers		–		5	–	3	–	0
Michigan Tech		–		2	–	2	–	1
Saint Louis		–		5	–	6	–	0
Central State (MI)		–		1	–	6	–	0
Haskell		–		0	–	7	–	1
Rankings from United Press

The 1935 Wayne Tartars football team represented Wayne University (later renamed Wayne State University) as an independent during the 1935 college football season. In their fourth year under head coach Joe Gembis, the Tartars compiled a 5–2–1 record and shut out four of eight opponents.

Fred Bens was the team captain. The team played its four home games at Kelsey Field located at the corner of Fourth and Lysander in Detroit and used an old house for lockers, showers, equipment and training rooms.

=== Schedule ===
Date	Opponent	Site	Result	Source
September 28	at St. Mary's (MI)	Orchard Lake, MI	W 33–0	
October 5	Michigan State Normal	Kelsey Field; Detroit, MI	L 6–16	
October 12	at Central State (MI)	Alumni Field; Mount Pleasant, MI	W 13–6	
October 19	Hillsdale^{†}	Kelsey Field; Detroit, MI	L 6–9	
October 26	at Buffalo	Rotary Field; Buffalo, NY	W 14–0	
November 2	Kalamazoo	Kelsey Field; Detroit, MI	W 13–12	
November 9	Hope	Kelsey Field; Detroit, MI	W 16–0	
November 16	at Albion	Albion, MI	T 0–0	
^{†}Homecoming

== 1936 ==
1936 Wayne Tartars football
- Conference: Independent
- Record: 5–2–1
- Head coach: Joe Gembis (5th season)
- Captain: None
- Home stadium: Kelsey Field

1936 Midwestern college football independents records
	Conf.			Overall
Team	W	L	T	W		L		T
DePaul		–		7	–	2	–	0
No. 20 Marquette		–		7	–	2	–	0
Michigan State		–		6	–	1	–	2
Michigan State Normal		–		6	–	2	–	0
No. 8 Notre Dame		–		6	–	2	–	1
Wayne		–		5	–	2	–	1
Detroit		–		7	–	3	–	0
Xavier		–		6	–	4	–	0
Saint Louis		–		5	–	4	–	1
Central Michigan		–		3	–	4	–	1
Michigan Tech		–		2	–	3	–	0
Western State Teachers		–		2	–	5	–	0
Haskell		–		1	–	6	–	1
Rankings from AP Poll

The 1936 Wayne Tartars football team represented Wayne University (later renamed Wayne State University) as an independent during the 1936 college football season. In their fifth year under head coach Joe Gembis, the Tartars compiled a 5–2–1 record and shut out four of eight opponents.

=== Schedule ===
Date	Opponent	Site	Result	Attendance	Source
September 26	at Michigan State	Macklin Field; East Lansing, MI	L 0–27	17,000	
October 3	Bluffton	Kelsey Field; Detroit, MI	W 13–0		
October 10	Central State (MI)	Kelsey Field; Detroit, MI	T 0–0		
October 17	at Michigan State Normal	Normal Field; Ypsilanti, MI	W 8–0		
October 31	at Toledo	Toledo, OH	W 9–6		
November 7	at Baldwin–Wallace	Berea, OH	L 20–66	4,000	
November 14	Buffalo^{†}	Kelsey Field; Detroit, MI	W 14–6	3,000	
November 21	Muskingum	Kelsey Field; Detroit, MI	W 19–0		
^{†}Homecoming

== 1937 ==
1937 Wayne Tartars football
- Conference: Independent
- Record: 6–2
- Head coach: Joe Gembis (6th season)
- Captain: None
- Home stadium: Roosevelt Field

1937 Midwestern college football independents records
	Conf.			Overall
Team	W	L	T	W		L		T
Michigan State		–		8	–	2	–	0
Akron		–		7	–	2	–	0
Central Michigan		–		6	–	2	–	0
DePaul		–		5	–	1	–	2
Wayne		–		6	–	2	–	0
No. T–9 Notre Dame		–		6	–	2	–	1
Detroit		–		7	–	3	–	0
Michigan State Normal		–		5	–	2	–	1
Western State Teachers		–		5	–	3	–	0
Michigan Tech		–		4	–	3	–	0
Xavier		–		4	–	5	–	1
Marquette		–		3	–	6	–	0
Haskell		–		2	–	7	–	0
Rankings from AP Poll

The 1937 Wayne Tartars football team represented Wayne University (later renamed Wayne State University) as an independent during the 1937 college football season. In their sixth year under head coach Joe Gembis, the Tartars compiled a 6–2 record, shut out four of eight opponents, and outscored all opponents by a combined total of 183 to 77. The coach's younger brother, George Gembis, and Frank "Ace" Cudillo were the stars of the team.

=== Schedule ===
Date	Opponent	Site	Result	Attendance	Source
September 25	at Michigan State	Macklin Field; East Lansing, MI	L 0–19	18,000	
October 2	at Akron	Buchtel Field; Akron, OH	W 19–13		
October 9	Louisville	Roosevelt Field; Detroit, MI	W 32–0	2,500	
October 16	at Central Michigan	Alumni Field; Mount Pleasant, MI	W 18–0		
October 30	Toledo	Roosevelt Field; Detroit, MI	L 19–39	> 6,000	
November 6	Michigan State Normal^{†}	Roosevelt Field; Detroit, MI	W 7–0	4,000	
November 13	at Buffalo	Rotary Field; Buffalo, NY	W 23–6		
November 20	Hillsdale	Roosevelt Field; Detroit, MI	W 65–0	2,000	
^{†}Homecoming

== 1938 ==
1938 Wayne Tartars football
- Conference: Independent
- Record: 2–6
- Head coach: Joe Gembis (7th season)
- Captain: George Gembis
- Home stadium: Keyworth Stadium

1938 Midwestern college football independents records
	Conf.			Overall
Team	W	L	T	W		L		T
No. 5 Notre Dame		–		8	–	1	–	0
Central Michigan		–		7	–	1	–	0
Michigan State Normal		–		6	–	1	–	1
Xavier		–		7	–	2	–	0
Akron		–		6	–	3	–	0
Michigan State		–		6	–	3	–	0
Detroit Tech		–		6	–	3	–	0
Detroit		–		6	–	4	–	0
Western State Teachers		–		4	–	3	–	0
Cincinnati		–		4	–	5	–	0
Haskell		–		2	–	6	–	0
Wayne		–		2	–	6	–	0
DePaul		–		2	–	7	–	0
Michigan Tech		–		1	–	5	–	0
Marquette		–		1	–	7	–	0
Rankings from AP poll

The 1938 Wayne Tartars football team represented Wayne University (later renamed Wayne State University) as an independent during the 1938 college football season. In their seventh year under head coach Joe Gembis, the Tartars compiled a 2–6 record and were outscored by opponents, 179 to 106. team defeated Akron (16–0) and Buffalo (35–0), but lost to Michigan State (34–6), Louisville (14–12), Michigan State Normal (20–7), Ohio (52–7), Toledo (39–20), and Central Michigan (20–3).

The 1938 team captain, George Gembis, became the first Wayne player to be selected in the National Football League Draft. He was selected by the Brooklyn Dodgers with the 115th overall pick in the 1939 NFL draft.

=== Schedule ===
Date	Opponent	Site	Result	Attendance	Source
September 24	at Michigan State	Macklin Field; East Lansing, MI	L 6–34	22,000	
October 1	Akron	Keyworth Stadium; Detroit, MI	W 16–0	5,000	
October 7	at Louisville	Maxwell Field; Louisville, KY	L 12–14	> 3,500	
October 15	at Michigan State Normal	Briggs Field; Ypsilanti, MI	L 7–20	3,500	
October 22	at Ohio	Athens, OH	L 7–52		
October 29	Toledo^{†}	Keyworth Stadium; Detroit, MI	L 20–39		
November 5	Central Michigan	Keyworth Stadium; Detroit, MI	L 3–20	5,600	
November 12	Buffalo	Keyworth Stadium; Detroit, MI	W 35–0	6,500	
^{†}Homecoming

== 1939 ==
1939 Wayne Tartars football
- Conference: Independent
- Record: 4–5
- Head coach: Joe Gembis (8th season)
- Captain: Frank Cudillo
- Home stadium: Keyworth Stadium

1939 Midwestern college football independents records
	Conf.			Overall
Team	W	L	T	W		L		T
Central Michigan		–		8	–	1	–	0
No. 13 Notre Dame		–		7	–	2	–	0
Michigan Tech		–		3	–	1	–	1
Ohio		–		6	–	3	–	0
Detroit		–		5	–	3	–	1
Akron		–		5	–	4	–	0
Cincinnati		–		4	–	3	–	2
Ohio Wesleyan		–		5	–	4	–	1
Marquette		–		4	–	4	–	0
Michigan State		–		4	–	4	–	1
Dayton		–		4	–	4	–	1
Michigan State Normal		–		3	–	3	–	1
Wayne		–		4	–	5	–	0
Xavier		–		3	–	5	–	1
Western State Teachers		–		2	–	6	–	1
Miami (OH)		–		1	–	7	–	1
Rankings from AP Poll

The 1939 Wayne Tartars football team represented Wayne University (later renamed Wayne State University) as an independent during the 1939 college football season. In their eighth year under head coach Joe Gembis, the Tartars compiled a 4–5 record and were outscored by opponents, 117 to 66.

Wayne was ranked at No. 303 (out of 609 teams) in the final Litkenhous Ratings for 1939.

=== Schedule ===
Date	Opponent	Site	Result	Attendance	Source
September 30	at Michigan State	Macklin Field; East Lansing, MI	L 0–16	23,000	
October 7	at Bowling Green	Bowling Green, OH	L 0–9		
October 13	at Michigan State Normal	Briggs Field; Ypsilanti, MI	W 9–7		
October 21	Cincinnati	Keyworth Stadium; Hamtramck, MI	L 0–21	3,500	
October 28	at Akron	Buchtel Field; Akron, OH	W 18–12	5,402	
November 4	Michigan State Normal^{†}	Keyworth Stadium; Hamtramck, MI	L 6–13	5,000	
November 11	at Central Michigan	Alumni Field; Mount Pleasant, MI	L 6–33	5,500	
November 18	Buffalo	Keyworth Stadium; Hamtramck, MI	W 20–0	4,500	
November 23	Western State Teachers (MI)	Keyworth Stadium; Hamtramck, MI	W 7–6	6,000	
^{†}Homecoming
