= 1938 Marquette Golden Avalanche football team =

American college football season

1938 Marquette Golden Avalanche football
- Conference: Independent
- Record: 1–7
- Head coach: Paddy Driscoll (2nd season)
- Home stadium: Marquette Stadium

1938 Midwestern college football independents records
	Conf.			Overall
Team	W	L	T	W		L		T
No. 5 Notre Dame		–		8	–	1	–	0
Central Michigan		–		7	–	1	–	0
Michigan State Normal		–		6	–	1	–	1
Xavier		–		7	–	2	–	0
Akron		–		6	–	3	–	0
Michigan State		–		6	–	3	–	0
Detroit Tech		–		6	–	3	–	0
Detroit		–		6	–	4	–	0
Western State Teachers		–		4	–	3	–	0
Cincinnati		–		4	–	5	–	0
Haskell		–		2	–	6	–	0
Wayne		–		2	–	6	–	0
DePaul		–		2	–	7	–	0
Michigan Tech		–		1	–	5	–	0
Marquette		–		1	–	7	–	0
Rankings from AP poll

The 1938 Marquette Golden Avalanche football team was an American football team that represented Marquette University as an independent during the 1938 college football season. In its second season under head coach Paddy Driscoll, the team compiled a 1–7 record and was outscored by a total of 122 to 35. The team played its home games at Marquette Stadium in Milwaukee.

== Schedule ==
Date	Opponent	Site	Result	Attendance	Source
October 1	at Wisconsin	Camp Randall Stadium; Madison, WI	L 0–27	27,876	
October 7	vs. SMU	Soldier Field; Chicago, IL	W 7–0	25,000	
October 14	Kansas State	Marquette Stadium; Milwaukee, WI	L 0–6	13,000	
October 22	No. 7 TCU	Marquette Stadium; Milwaukee, WI	L 0–21		
October 29	Iowa State	Marquette Stadium; Milwaukee, WI	L 0–7	7,070	
November 12	Michigan State	Marquette Stadium; Milwaukee, WI	L 14–20	13,000	
November 19	at Arizona	Arizona Stadium; Tucson, AZ	L 12–20	10,000	
November 26	at No. 17 Texas Tech	Tech Field; Lubbock, TX	L 2–21	12,000	
Rankings from AP Poll released prior to the game
