= 1938 Notre Dame Fighting Irish football team =

American college football season

1938 Notre Dame Fighting Irish football

National champion (Dickinson)
- Conference: Independent

Ranking
- AP: No. 5
- Record: 8–1
- Head coach: Elmer Layden (5th season)
- Captain: Jim McGoldrick
- Home stadium: Notre Dame Stadium

1938 Midwestern college football independents records
	Conf.			Overall
Team	W	L	T	W		L		T
No. 5 Notre Dame		–		8	–	1	–	0
Central Michigan		–		7	–	1	–	0
Michigan State Normal		–		6	–	1	–	1
Xavier		–		7	–	2	–	0
Akron		–		6	–	3	–	0
Michigan State		–		6	–	3	–	0
Detroit Tech		–		6	–	3	–	0
Detroit		–		6	–	4	–	0
Western State Teachers		–		4	–	3	–	0
Cincinnati		–		4	–	5	–	0
Haskell		–		2	–	6	–	0
Wayne		–		2	–	6	–	0
DePaul		–		2	–	7	–	0
Michigan Tech		–		1	–	5	–	0
Marquette		–		1	–	7	–	0
Rankings from AP poll

The 1938 Notre Dame Fighting Irish football team was an American football team that represented the University of Notre Dame as an independent during the 1938 college football season. In their fifth year under head coach Elmer Layden, the Fighting Irish compiled an 8–1 record, outscored opponents by a total of 149 to 39, and were ranked No. 5 in the final AP poll. They won their first eight games and were ranked No. 1 in the AP poll, but lost to No. 8 USC in the final game of the season.

While the loss to USC dropped Notre Dame to No. 5 in the AP poll, and No. 4 in the Litkenhous Ratings, the Dickinson System ranked Notre Dame as the national champion, entitling the Irish to the Knute Rockne Memorial Trophy. Notre Dame does not claim a national championship for this season.

Tackle Ed Beinor, who also received All-America honors in 1937, was a unanimous first-team pick for the 1938 All-America college football team. End Earl Brown also received first-team honors from the All-America Board, the Walter Camp Football Foundation, and Liberty magazine. Jim McGoldrick was the team captain.

The team played its home games at Notre Dame Stadium in Notre Dame, Indiana.

== Schedule ==
Date	Opponent	Rank	Site	Result	Attendance	Source
October 1	Kansas		Notre Dame Stadium; Notre Dame, IN	W 52–0	25,615	
October 8	at Georgia Tech		Grant Field; Atlanta, GA (rivalry)	W 14–6	26,533	
October 15	Illinois		Notre Dame Stadium; Notre Dame, IN	W 14–6	29,142	
October 22	No. 13 Carnegie Tech	No. 5	Notre Dame Stadium; Notre Dame, IN	W 7–0	25,934	
October 29	vs. Army	No. 7	Yankee Stadium; Bronx, NY (rivalry)	W 19–7	76,338	
November 5	vs. Navy	No. 4	Municipal Stadium; Baltimore, MD (rivalry)	W 15–0	58,271	
November 12	No. 12 Minnesota	No. 2	Notre Dame Stadium; Notre Dame, IN	W 19–0	55,245	
November 19	at No. 16 Northwestern	No. 1	Dyche Stadium; Evanston, IL (rivalry)	W 9–7	46,348	
December 3	at No. 8 USC	No. 1	Los Angeles Memorial Coliseum; Los Angeles, CA (rivalry)	L 0–13	97,146	
Rankings from AP Poll released prior to the game; Source:
