= 1938 DePaul Blue Demons football team =

American college football season

1938 DePaul Blue Demons football
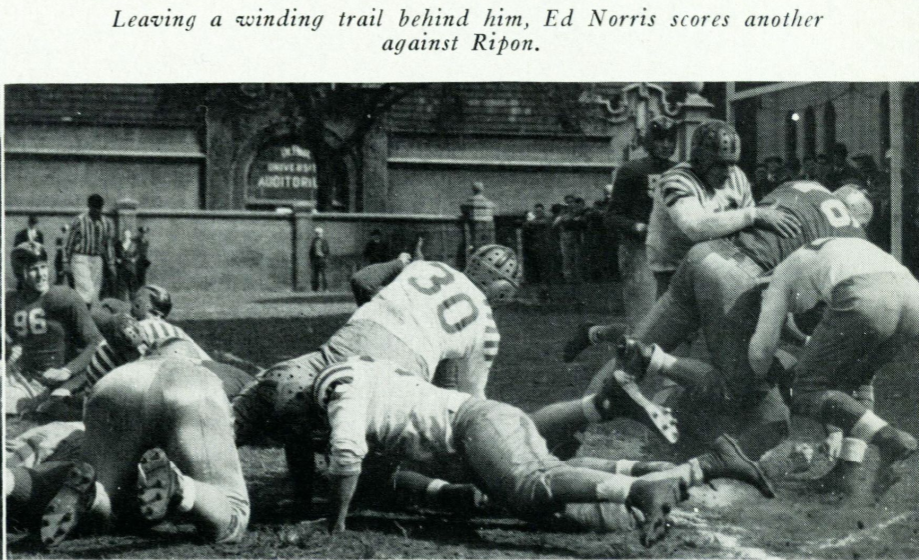
- The Blue Demons defeat Ripon in the program's final game at DePaul Field on September 24. "The Barn" can be seen in the background.
- Conference: Independent
- Record: 2–7
- Head coach: Ben Connor (4th season)
- Captain: Tom Roberts
- Home stadium: Wrigley Field, Mills Stadium

1938 Midwestern college football independents records
	Conf.			Overall
Team	W	L	T	W		L		T
No. 5 Notre Dame		–		8	–	1	–	0
Central Michigan		–		7	–	1	–	0
Michigan State Normal		–		6	–	1	–	1
Xavier		–		7	–	2	–	0
Akron		–		6	–	3	–	0
Michigan State		–		6	–	3	–	0
Detroit Tech		–		6	–	3	–	0
Detroit		–		6	–	4	–	0
Western State Teachers		–		4	–	3	–	0
Cincinnati		–		4	–	5	–	0
Haskell		–		2	–	6	–	0
Wayne		–		2	–	6	–	0
DePaul		–		2	–	7	–	0
Michigan Tech		–		1	–	5	–	0
Marquette		–		1	–	7	–	0
Rankings from AP poll

The 1938 DePaul Blue Demons football team was an American football team that represented DePaul University as an independent during the 1938 college football season. In its second season under head coach Ben Connor, the team compiled a 2–7 record and was outscored by a total of 198 to 118. The team played its home games at Wrigley Field and DePaul Field in Chicago.

In December 1938, DePaul announced that it was discontinuing its intercollegiate football program.

== Schedule ==
Date	Opponent	Site	Result	Attendance	Source
September 24	Ripon	De Paul Field; Chicago, IL	W 38–0		
October 1	at Illinois	Memorial Stadium; Champaign, IL	L 7–44	11,414	
October 8	at Montana	Dornblaser Field; Missoula, MT	L 6–7		
October 14	at North Dakota	Memorial Stadium; Grand Forks, ND	L 12–32		
October 22	Loyola (LA)	Wrigley Field; Chicago, IL	L 0–13		
November 5	Catholic University	Wrigley Field; Chicago, IL	L 13–14		
November 12	Saint Louis	Loyola Stadium; Chicago, IL	W 20–9		
November 19	at Centenary	Centenary Field; Shreveport, LA	L 0–48	6,000	
November 24	at Wichita	Shocker Stadium; Wichita, KS	L 13–31	5,000	
