= 1931 Superior State Yellowjackets football team =

American college football season

1931 Superior State Yellowjackets football
- Conference: Wisconsin State Teachers College Conference
- Record: 7–0 (3–0 WSTCC)
- Head coach: Ted Whereatt (2nd season)
- Captain: Joe Lesczynski
- Home stadium: Gates Field

1931 Wisconsin State Teachers College Conference football standings
	Conf.					Overall
Team	W		L		T	W		L		T
Milwaukee State $	4	–	0	–	0	5	–	2	–	0
Superior State	3	–	0	–	0	7	–	0	–	0
River Falls State	3	–	1	–	0	3	–	4	–	1
Whitewater State	3	–	1	–	0	6	–	1	–	0
La Crosse State	4	–	2	–	0	5	–	2	–	1
Oshkosh State	2	–	3	–	1	3	–	4	–	1
Platteville State	1	–	2	–	1	4	–	2	–	1
Eau Claire State	1	–	3	–	1	1	–	5	–	1
Stevens Point State	0	–	5	–	1	1	–	6	–	1
Stout Institute	0	–	4	–	0	2	–	6	–	0
$ – Conference champion

The 1931 Superior State Yellowjackets football team represented Superior State Teachers College (now known as University of Wisconsin–Superior) as a member of the Wisconsin State Teachers College Conference (WSTCC) during the 1931 college football season. In their second year under head coach Ted Whereatt, the Yellowjackets compiled a perfect 7–0 record (3–0 against WSTCC opponents), shut out five of seven opponents, and outscored all opponents by a total of 224 to 13.

The Yellowjackets returned to the WSTCC in 1931 after having been suspended in 1930 for using ineligible players. Despite its undefeated season, Superior was ineligible for the WSTCC championship as it did not fulfill the requirement of playing four games against conference opponents.

After the season, the conference coaches selected an all-conference team. Two Superior players, end Joe Lesczynski and halfback Clark Croft, were named to the first team. Guard Harry Erbeck was named to the second team.

The team played its home games at Gates Field in Superior, Wisconsin.

== Schedule ==
Date	Opponent	Site	Result	Source
October 2	Michigan Tech*	Gates Field; Superior, WI	W 43–0	
October 10	at Northern State Teachers (MI)*	Marquette, MI	W 57–0	
October 16	Eau Claire State	Gates Field; Superior, WI	W 46–0	
October 24	at Stout State	Menominie, WI	W 32–0	
October 30	Northern State Teachers (SD)*^{†}	Gates Field; Superior, WI	W 13–6	
November 6	Duluth Teachers*	Gates Field; Superior, WI	W 27–7	
November 13	at La Crosse State	La Crosse, WI	W 6–0	
*Non-conference game; ^{†}Homecoming

== Players ==
- "Long Jim" Barrett, end
- Fred Canady, tackle
- Louis Christianson, quarterback
- Clark Croft, halfback
- Harry Erbeck, guard
- Art Evered, center
- Larry Hogan, quarterback
- Irving Johnson, end
- Joe Lesczynski, end and captain
- Fred Proper, end
- Roy Reible, halfback
- Jerry Thune, fullback
- Dave Winer, quarterback/halfback
