= Dave Diehl =

American football player (1918–1994)

Profile
- Position: End

Personal information
- Born: September 30, 1918; Dansville, Michigan, U.S.
- Died: September 15, 1994 (age 75); Lansing, Michigan, U.S.
- Listed height: 6 ft 0 in (1.83 m)
- Listed weight: 195 lb (88 kg)

Career information
- High school: Dansville (MI)
- College: Michigan State University

Career history
- Detroit Lions (1939–1940, 1944–1945)
- Stats at Pro Football Reference

David Douglas Diehl (September 30, 1918 – September 15, 1994) was an American football player.

Diehl played college football for Michigan State College (later known as Michigan State University). He was co-captain of the 1938 Michigan State Spartans football team that compiled a 6–3 record.

He also played professional football in the National Football League for the Detroit Lions from 1939 to 1940 and 1944 to 1945. He also served as the Michigan State Spartans' ends coach in 1941. In 1944, he ranked third in the NFL with 426 receiving yards and led the league with an average of 23.7 yards per reception. He was also the first Lion to tally three touchdown receptions in a single game.

Diehl played a leadership role in the creation and administration of Lansing Community College. In 1958, he was a member of the committee that studied the establishment of the college. Upon its formation, he served as a trustee for 24 years from 1964 to 1989. He was involved in controversy in 1987 when he alleged directed racial slurs at another board member.

Diehl was also a farmer whose crops included corn, soybean, and wheat.

Diehl was inducted into the Greater Lansing Area Sports Hall of Fame in 1989. He died in 1994 at age 75.<ref name=obit/.
