= 1938 Western State Teachers Hilltoppers football team =

American college football season

1938 Western State Teachers Hilltoppers football
- Conference: Independent
- Record: 4–3
- Head coach: Mike Gary (10th season)
- Captains: Walter Oberlin; Dale Morris

1938 Midwestern college football independents records
	Conf.			Overall
Team	W	L	T	W		L		T
No. 5 Notre Dame		–		8	–	1	–	0
Central Michigan		–		7	–	1	–	0
Michigan State Normal		–		6	–	1	–	1
Xavier		–		7	–	2	–	0
Akron		–		6	–	3	–	0
Michigan State		–		6	–	3	–	0
Detroit Tech		–		6	–	3	–	0
Detroit		–		6	–	4	–	0
Western State Teachers		–		4	–	3	–	0
Cincinnati		–		4	–	5	–	0
Haskell		–		2	–	6	–	0
Wayne		–		2	–	6	–	0
DePaul		–		2	–	7	–	0
Michigan Tech		–		1	–	5	–	0
Marquette		–		1	–	7	–	0
Rankings from AP poll

The 1938 Western State Teachers Hilltoppers football team represented Western State Teachers College (later renamed Western Michigan University) as an independent during the 1938 college football season. In their 10th season under head coach Mike Gary, the Broncos compiled a 4–3 record and outscored their opponents, 102 to 26. Center Walter Oberlin and halfback Dale Morris were the team captains.

== Schedule ==
Date	Opponent	Site	Result	Attendance	Source
September 24	Illinois College	Western State Teachers College Field; Kalamazoo, MI	W 28–0		
September 30	at Detroit	University of Detroit Stadium; Detroit, MI	L 0–7	>18,000	
October 8	Iowa State Teachers	Western State Teachers College Field; Kalamazoo, MI	W 20–0		
October 15	at Akron	Buchtel Field; Akron, OH	L 0–6		
October 29	Western Kentucky State Teachers	Western State Teachers College Field; Kalamazoo, MI	L 6–13		
November 5	at Butler	Butler Bowl; Indianapolis, IN	W 13–0		
November 12	Central Michigan	Western State Teachers College Field; Kalamazoo, MI (rivalry)	W 35–0		
