= 1938 Michigan State Normal Hurons football team =

American college football season

1938 Michigan State Normal Hurons football
- Conference: Independent
- Record: 6–1–1
- Head coach: Elton Rynearson (17th season)
- Captains: George J. Miller; Fred J. Gruber
- Home stadium: Briggs Field

1938 Midwestern college football independents records
| | Conf. | | | Overall |
| Team | W | L | T | W | | L | | T |
|---|---|---|---|---|---|---|---|---|
| No. 5 Notre Dame | | – | | 8 | – | 1 | – | 0 |
| Central Michigan | | – | | 7 | – | 1 | – | 0 |
| Michigan State Normal | | – | | 6 | – | 1 | – | 1 |
| Xavier | | – | | 7 | – | 2 | – | 0 |
| Akron | | – | | 6 | – | 3 | – | 0 |
| Michigan State | | – | | 6 | – | 3 | – | 0 |
| Detroit Tech | | – | | 6 | – | 3 | – | 0 |
| Detroit | | – | | 6 | – | 4 | – | 0 |
| Western State Teachers | | – | | 4 | – | 3 | – | 0 |
| Cincinnati | | – | | 4 | – | 5 | – | 0 |
| Haskell | | – | | 2 | – | 6 | – | 0 |
| Wayne | | – | | 2 | – | 6 | – | 0 |
| DePaul | | – | | 2 | – | 7 | – | 0 |
| Michigan Tech | | – | | 1 | – | 5 | – | 0 |
| Marquette | | – | | 1 | – | 7 | – | 0 |
Rankings from AP poll

The 1938 Michigan State Normal Hurons football team represented Michigan State Normal College (later renamed Eastern Michigan University) as an independent during the 1938 college football season. In their 17th season under head coach Elton Rynearson, the Hurons compiled a record of 6–1–1 and outscored their opponents by a combined total of 166 to 36. George J. Miller and Fred J. Gruber were the team captains. The team played its home games at Briggs Field on the school's campus in Ypsilanti, Michigan.

== Schedule ==
| Date | Opponent | Site | Result | Attendance | Source |
|---|---|---|---|---|---|
| September 24 | at Indiana State | Terre Haute, IN | W 37–0 | | |
| September 30 | at Alma | Alma, MI | W 20–0 | | |
| October 7 | at Illinois State Normal | Normal, IL | W 12–6 | | |
| October 14 | Wayne^{†} | Briggs Field; Ypsilanti, MI | W 20–7 | 3,500 | |
| October 21 | at Central Michigan | Mount Pleasant, MI (rivalry) | L 6–7 | | |
| October 28 | at Bowling Green | Bowling Green, OH | T 7–7 | 3,000 | |
| November 4 | Kalamazoo | Briggs Field; Ypsilanti, MI | W 39–7 | | |
| November 11 | Northern Michigan | Briggs Field; Ypsilanti, MI | W 25–2 | | |
^{†}Homecoming
