= 1938 Central Michigan Bearcats football team =

American college football season

1938 Central Michigan Bearcats football
- Conference: Independent
- Record: 7–1
- Head coach: Ron Finch (2nd season)
- Home stadium: Alumni Field

1938 Midwestern college football independents records
	Conf.			Overall
Team	W	L	T	W		L		T
No. 5 Notre Dame		–		8	–	1	–	0
Central Michigan		–		7	–	1	–	0
Michigan State Normal		–		6	–	1	–	1
Xavier		–		7	–	2	–	0
Akron		–		6	–	3	–	0
Michigan State		–		6	–	3	–	0
Detroit Tech		–		6	–	3	–	0
Detroit		–		6	–	4	–	0
Western State Teachers		–		4	–	3	–	0
Cincinnati		–		4	–	5	–	0
Haskell		–		2	–	6	–	0
Wayne		–		2	–	6	–	0
DePaul		–		2	–	7	–	0
Michigan Tech		–		1	–	5	–	0
Marquette		–		1	–	7	–	0
Rankings from AP poll

The 1938 Central Michigan Bearcats football team represented Central Michigan College of Education, later renamed Central Michigan University, as an independent during the 1938 college football season. In their second season under head coach Ron Finch, the Bearcats compiled a 7–1 record, shut out five of eight opponents, held seven opponents to fewer than seven points, and outscored their opponents by a combined total of 270 to 44. The team's sole loss was by a 35–0 score to Western State Teachers.

== Schedule ==
Date	Opponent	Site	Result	Attendance	Source
September 23	Lawrence Tech	Alumni Field; Mount Pleasant, MI	W 44–0		
September 30	Ferris Institute	Alumni Field; Mount Pleasant, MI	W 68–0		
October 8	at Northern State Teachers	Marquette, MI	W 47–0		
October 15	Bluffton^{†}	Alumni Field; Mount Pleasant, MI	W 45–0		
October 21	Michigan State Normal	Alumni Field; Mount Pleasant, MI (rivalry)	W 7–6		
October 28	St. Mary's (MI)	Alumni Field; Mount Pleasant, MI	W 39–0		
November 5	at Wayne	Keyworth Stadium; Detroit, MI	W 20–3	5,600	
November 12	at Western State Teachers (MI)	Western State Teachers College Field; Kalamazoo, MI (rivalry)	L 0–35		
^{†}Homecoming
