= 1938 Detroit Titans football team =

American college football season

1938 Detroit Titans football
- Conference: Independent
- Record: 6–4
- Head coach: Gus Dorais (14th season)
- Captain: Alex Chesney
- Home stadium: University of Detroit Stadium

1938 Midwestern college football independents records
	Conf.			Overall
Team	W	L	T	W		L		T
No. 5 Notre Dame		–		8	–	1	–	0
Central Michigan		–		7	–	1	–	0
Michigan State Normal		–		6	–	1	–	1
Xavier		–		7	–	2	–	0
Akron		–		6	–	3	–	0
Michigan State		–		6	–	3	–	0
Detroit Tech		–		6	–	3	–	0
Detroit		–		6	–	4	–	0
Western State Teachers		–		4	–	3	–	0
Cincinnati		–		4	–	5	–	0
Haskell		–		2	–	6	–	0
Wayne		–		2	–	6	–	0
DePaul		–		2	–	7	–	0
Michigan Tech		–		1	–	5	–	0
Marquette		–		1	–	7	–	0
Rankings from AP poll

The 1938 Detroit Titans football team represented the University of Detroit in the 1938 college football season. In their 14th year under head coach Gus Dorais, the Titans compiled a 6–4 record and outscored opponents by a combined total of 148 to 42.

In addition to head coach Gus Dorais, the team's coaching staff included Lloyd Brazil (backfield coach), Bud Boeringer (line coach), and Michael H. "Dad" Butler (trainer). End Alex Chesney was the team captain.

== Schedule ==
Date	Time	Opponent	Site	Result	Attendance	Source
September 24		at Purdue	Ross–Ade Stadium; West Lafayette, IN	L 6–19	>24,000	
September 30		Western State Teachers	University of Detroit Stadium; Detroit, MI	W 7–0	>18,000	
October 7		Catholic University	University of Detroit Stadium; Detroit, MI	W 27–0		
October 12		at Boston College	Fenway Park; Boston, MA	L 6–9		
October 23		at No. 20 Villanova	Shibe Park; Philadelphia, PA	L 6–13	25,000	
October 28		at Duquesne	Forbes Field; Pittsburgh, PA	L 6–14	9,000	
November 5		North Dakota	University of Detroit Stadium; Detroit, MI	W 38–6		
November 12		at NC State	Riddick Stadium; Raleigh, NC	W 7–0	8,000	
November 19		Tulsa	University of Detroit Stadium; Detroit, MI	W 39–14	17,000	
November 27	5:00 p.m.	at No. 19 Santa Clara	Sacramento Stadium; Sacramento, CA	W 7–6	16,000	
Rankings from AP Poll released prior to the game; All times are in Eastern time
