= 1938 Toledo Rockets football team =

American college football season

1938 Toledo Rockets football
- Conference: Ohio Athletic Conference
- Record: 6–3–1 (0–0–1 OAC)
- Head coach: Clarence Spears (3rd season)
- Captain: Tony Popp

1938 Ohio Athletic Conference football standings
	Conf.					Overall
Team	W		L		T	W		L		T
Wooster $	5	–	0	–	2	5	–	0	–	3
John Carroll	4	–	0	–	2	6	–	2	–	1
Ohio Northern	6	–	1	–	1	6	–	1	–	1
Capital	5	–	1	–	1	6	–	1	–	1
Denison	5	–	2	–	0	7	–	2	–	0
Mount Union	4	–	2	–	0	5	–	3	–	0
Muskingum	4	–	2	–	1	5	–	3	–	1
Wittenberg	4	–	2	–	0	4	–	4	–	0
Baldwin–Wallace	2	–	1	–	0	3	–	5	–	0
Kent State	3	–	2	–	0	6	–	2	–	0
Toledo	0	–	0	–	1	6	–	3	–	1
Bowling Green	2	–	2	–	2	3	–	2	–	3
Case	2	–	2	–	1	2	–	4	–	2
Oberlin	1	–	4	–	0	3	–	4	–	1
Findlay	1	–	4	–	0	3	–	5	–	0
Kenyon	1	–	4	–	0	1	–	5	–	0
Marietta	1	–	4	–	0	1	–	6	–	0
Otterbein	1	–	5	–	0	2	–	6	–	0
Heidelberg	1	–	7	–	0	1	–	8	–	0
Ashland	0	–	7	–	0	0	–	7	–	0
$ – Conference champion

The 1938 Toledo Rockets football team was an American football team that represented Toledo University in the Ohio Athletic Conference (OAC) during the 1938 college football season. In their third season under head coach Clarence Spears, the Rockets compiled a 6–3–1 record.

== Schedule ==
Date	Opponent	Site	Result	Attendance	Source
September 24	West Liberty State Teachers*	University Stadium; Toledo, OH	W 13–0		
October 1	Saint Joseph's (IN)*	University Stadium; Toledo, OH	W 26–0		
October 8	Ohio Wesleyan*	University Stadium; Toledo, OH	W 26–0		
October 15	at Dayton*	Dayton, OH	L 13–17		
October 22	Marshall*	University Stadium; Toledo, OH	W 13–7		
October 29	at Wayne*	Keyworth Stadium; Detroit, MI	W 39–20		
November 5	John Carroll	University Stadium; Toledo, OH	T 6–6		
November 12	at Akron*	Buchtel Field; Akron, OH	L 7–13		
November 24	at Xavier*	Xavier Stadium; Cincinnati, OH	L 0–13	7,000	
December 2	at St. Mary's (TX)*	Eagle Field; San Antonio, TX	W 13–7		
*Non-conference game

== After the season ==
=== NFL draft ===
The 1939 NFL draft was held on December 9, 1938. The following Rocket was selected.

Round	Pick	Player	Position	NFL club
5	185	Tony Popp	End	Brooklyn Dodgers
