= Arnold and Gertrude Goss House =

- U.S. National Register of Historic Places
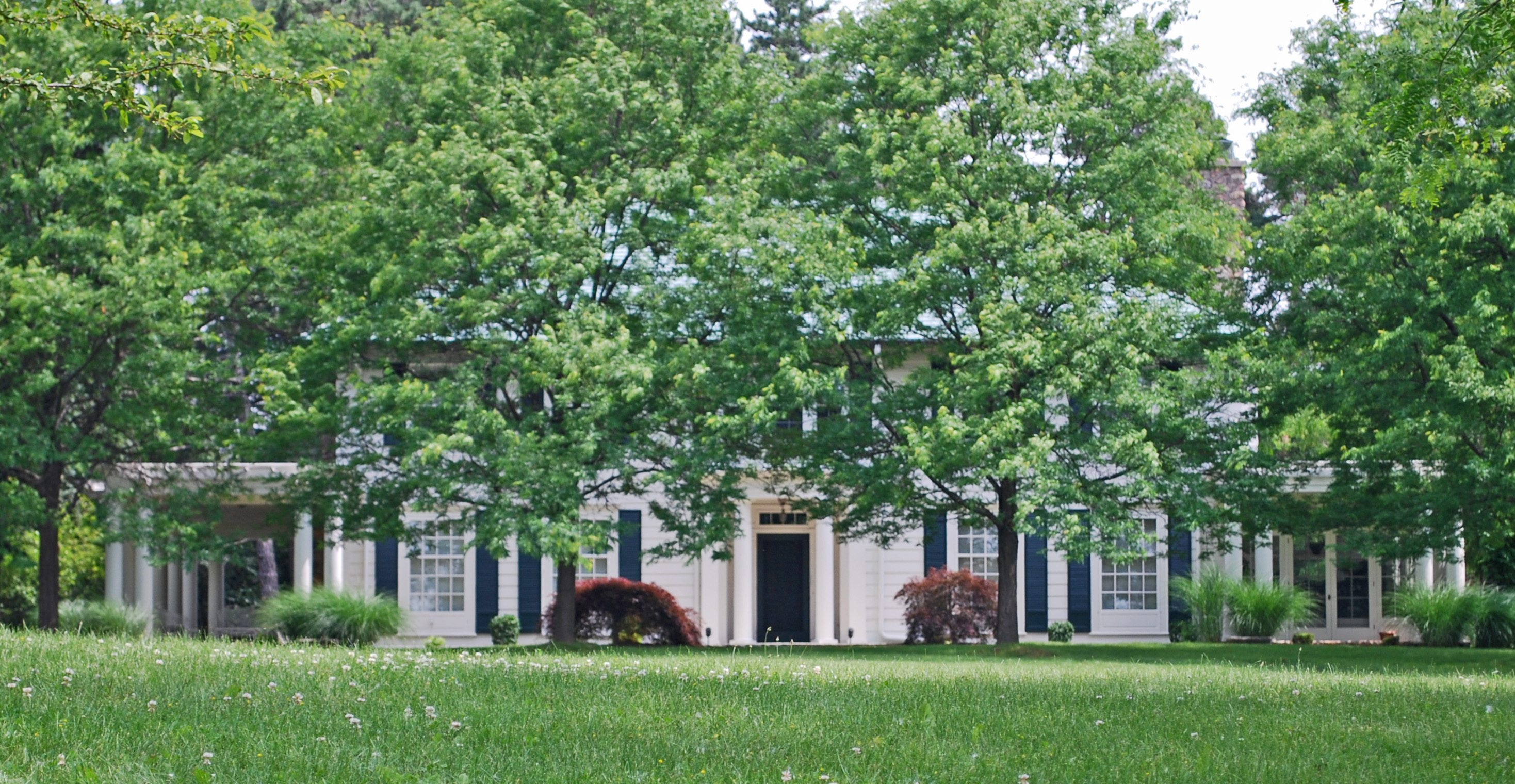

- Location within Michigan Location within the United States
- Interactive map
- Location: 3215 W. Dobson Place, Ann Arbor, Michigan
- Coordinates: 42°17′26″N 83°41′56″W
- Area: 5 acres (2.0 ha)
- Built: 1922
- Architect: George DeWitt Mason, Aubrey William Tealdi
- Architectural style: Colonial Revival, Classical Revival, et al.
- NRHP reference No.: 06000402
- Added to NRHP: May 17, 2006

The Arnold and Gertrude Goss House is a single-family home located at 3215 W. Dobson Place in Ann Arbor, Michigan. It was listed on the National Register of Historic Places in 2006.

== History ==
Arnold Goss was born in Laingsburg, Michigan in 1875 and graduated from Albion College. He apprenticed at a Bay City law firm and was admitted to the bar in 1905. He was an executive with William Durant when Durant founded Buick Motor Company and became secretary of the company in 1908. Goss negotiated several key financial deals for the company, including the 1909 acquisition of Cadillac. Goss left General Motors in 1914 and helped bankroll the development of Kelvinator, becoming president of that company when it went public in 1921.

In 1923, Goss purchased this 600-acre property near Ann Arbor, in part to develop a herd of Jersey cattle. He immediately had this house built, using plans by Detroit architect George DeWitt Mason. The estate grounds around the residence were designed by Italian landscape architect and director of the Nichols Arboretum, Aubrey Tealdi, in the 1920s. Goss continued to live here until his death in 1938. He was survived by his wife Gertrude and three children. His youngest son, Kelly, moved into the house in the 1960s with his family. Kelly sold off most of the acreage surrounding the house, with only 40 acres remaining by 1980. In 1985, the house and surrounding five acres were purchased by the Bund family.

== Description ==
The Goss House is a two-and-a half-story house clad with cypress clapboard, featuring elements of both Georgian Colonial Revival and Craftsman styles. It has a symmetrical five-bay facade and a hip roof with overhanging eaves. The house has a single-story sunroom attached on one side and a porch on the other. The central front door has classical sidelights and a transom, and a curved, Federal-style, entry portico. Two large 8-over-12 double-hung windows are on either side of the portico. Smaller 8-over-8 windows are located above.

On the interior, a large center hall runs from front to rear and contains a spiral staircase. Off the hall are a living room on one side and a dining room on the other. A library is behind the living room, and a sunroom is located off the dining room. To the rear is a large kitchen, formed by combining what were originally the kitchen, butler's pantry, and servant's dining room. The second floor features a wide hall, five bedrooms, a sewing room, and a bathroom.
