= Joe Gembis =

American football player and coach (1907–1969)

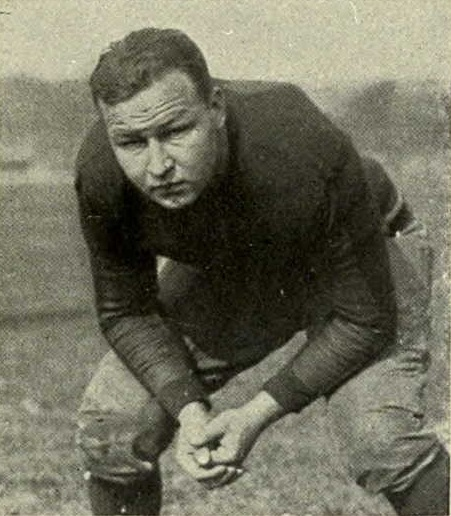
- Gembis from 1929 Michiganensian

Biographical details
- Born: September 29, 1907; Vicksburg, Michigan, U.S.
- Died: July 5, 1969 (aged 61); Mayfield, Michigan, U.S.

Playing career
- 1926–1929: Michigan
- 1930: Ironton Tanks
- Positions: Fullback, placekicker

Coaching career (HC unless noted)
- 1931: Chesapeake HS (OH)
- 1932–1945: Detroit City College / Wayne

Head coaching record
- Overall: 42–51–8 (college); 6–4–1 (high school)

Accomplishments and honors

Awards
- Second-team All-Big Ten (1929)

Joseph George Gembis (September 29, 1907 – July 5, 1969), sometimes known by the nickname "Dynamite Joe", was an American football player and coach. He played college football at the University of Michigan from 1926 to 1929 and professional football for the Ironton Tanks in 1930. He later served as the head football coach at Wayne State University for 14 years, from 1932 to 1945.

== Early years ==
Gembis was born in Vicksburg, Michigan, in 1907. He attended Vicksburg High School.

== Football player ==
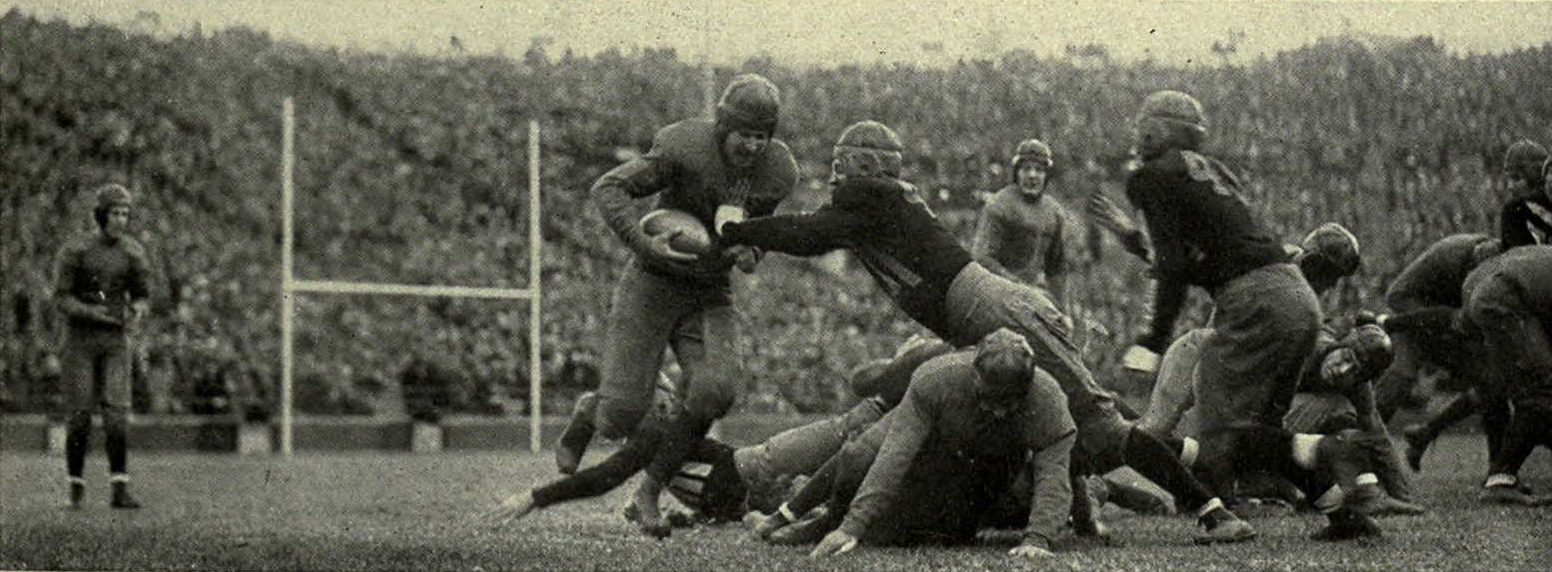
Gembis carrying ball against Iowa, 1928

Gembis played college football at the University of Michigan from 1927 to 1929 as a fullback and placekicker. Highlights of Gembis' playing career at Michigan included the following:

- On November 3, 1928, Gembis ended Illinois' undefeated season, kicking a field goal for the game's only points in a 3–0 Michigan victory. This was the first field goal kicked in Michigan Stadium history.
- On November 24, 1928, Gembis scored four points on a field goal and an extra point to lead Michigan to a 10–7 victory over Iowa.
- On October 5, 1929, Gembis scored 11 points on a touchdown run, field goal, and two extra points in a 17–0 victory over Michigan State.
- On November 9, 1929, Gembis' two extra points provided the winning margin in a 14–12 victory over Harvard.
- On November 16, 1929, Gembis was credited with playing a "whale of a game," and his extra point kick gave Michigan a 7–6 victory over Minnesota.

The Detroit Free Press in November 1929 noted: "Gembis' presence in the blue line up has been invaluable. His place kicking has been an indispensable factor in the Wolverine attack. Without the service of his productive toe, it is extremely doubtful if Michigan's record would be studded with any major victories." Gembis received his bachelor of arts degree from Michigan in 1930.

In 1930, Gembis played semi-professional football as a fullback and placekicker for the Ironton Tanks in Ironton, Ohio. The Cincinnati Enquirer in November 1930 wrote: "Dynamite Joe Gembis, Tank fullback, is without a doubt the finest line-smasher to ever show at Redland Field."

== Football coach ==
Gembis spent one year as a football coach at Chesapeake High School in Ohio. His 1931 Chesapeake team compiled a 6–4–1 record.

In July 1932, he was hired as the head coach at College of the City of Detroit (later renamed Wayne University in 1934 and later Wayne State University). He remained in that position for 14 years. His 1934 team compiled a 7–1 record, and from 1934 to 1937 his teams went 23–7. However, the program declined after 1937, winning only six games from 1941 to 1945. He was fired in April 1946. Gembis compiled a career record of 42–51–8 (.455) at Wayne State.

== Family and later years ==
Gembis was married to Florence Ruby Smith in June 1934. They had three children, Douglas (born March 1935), Ann, and Charles (born March 1946). In his later years, Gembis continued to work as an associate professor of health and physical education at Wayne State. He also operated the Haza Witka Summer Camp in Mayfield, Michigan. He died from a heart attack at the camp in July 1969 at age 61.

Gembis was posthumously inducted into the Wayne State University Hall of Fame in 1980.

== Head coaching record ==
=== College ===
Year	Team	Overall	Conference	Standing	Bowl/playoffs
Detroit City College / Wayne Tartars (Independent) (1932–1945)
1932	Detroit City College	1–6			
1933	Detroit City College	2–5–1			
1934	Wayne	7–1			
1935	Wayne	5–2–1			
1936	Wayne	5–2–1			
1937	Wayne	6–2			
1938	Wayne	2–6			
1939	Wayne	4–5			
1940	Wayne	4–1–3			
1941	Wayne	2–6			
1942	Wayne	1–6–1			
1943	Wayne	0–3			
1944	Wayne	1–1			
1945	Wayne	2–5–1			
Detroit City College / Wayne:		42–51–8			
Total:		42–51–8			
