= John Pingel =

American football player (1916–1999)

Johnny Pingel
No. 37
- Positions: Back, punter

Personal information
- Born: November 6, 1916; Mount Clemens, Michigan, U.S.
- Died: August 14, 1999 (aged 82); Palm Beach Gardens, Florida, U.S.
- Listed height: 6 ft 0 in (1.83 m)
- Listed weight: 175 lb (79 kg)

Career information
- High school: Mount Clemens
- College: Michigan State (1936–1938)
- NFL draft: 1939: 1st round, 7th overall pick

Career history
- Detroit Lions (1939)

Awards and highlights
- First-team All-American (1938); Second-team All-American (1937); Michigan State Football Ring of Honor (Inducted 2010) NCAA record: Most punting yards in a season: 4,138 (1938-2024)

Career NFL statistics
- Rushing yards: 301
- Rushing average: 4.1
- Rushing touchdowns: 1
- Passing yards: 343
- TD-INT: 3-4
- Punts: 32
- Punting yards: 1,368
- Stats at Pro Football Reference
- College Football Hall of Fame

John Spencer Pingel (November 6, 1916 – August 14, 1999) was an American professional football back and punter.

Pingel played college football at the Michigan State University and was selected as a first-team All-American in 1938 and second-team in 1937. He holds the all-time NCAA record for most punting yards in a season with 4,138 yards in 1938. Pingel was a triple-threat man who also ranked among the NCAA leaders in rushing (7th with an average of 5.0 yards per rush) and passing (7th win an average of 6 completions per game) during the 1938 season.

Pingel was selected by the Detroit Lions in the first round (7th overall pick) of the 1939 NFL draft. He signed with the Lions in May 1939 and played in nine games, eight as a starter for the 1939 Detroit Lions. After retiring from football, he had a career in advertising, and was the chief executive officer of the Ross Roy advertising agency. He was elected to the College Football Hall of Fame in 1968. Pingel died at age 82 in Palm Beach Gardens, Florida.
