= Rumble in the Rockies =

American college football rivalry

- Colorado Buffaloes Utah Utes
- First meeting: October 3, 1903; Colorado, 22–0
- Latest meeting: October 17, 2026; Utah, 27–24

Statistics
- Total meetings: 73
- All-time series: Utah, 37–33–3 (.527)
- Largest victory: Colorado: 54–0 (1951); Utah: 53–7 (2025)
- Longest win streak: Utah: 9 (1925–1933)
- Current win streak: Utah: 2 (2025–present)

Locations of Utah and Colorado

The Rumble in the Rockies, or Colorado–Utah football rivalry, is an American college football rivalry between the University of Colorado Buffaloes from Boulder and the University of Utah Utes of Salt Lake City. After nearly five decades of dormancy, the rivalry was revived in 2011, when both joined the Pac-12 Conference.

From 1903 until 1962, Utah and Colorado played each other nearly every year, a total of 57 games. At that time, it was the second-most played rivalry for both teams (Utah had played Utah State 62 times; Colorado had played Colorado State 61 times). After the 1962 meeting, a second consecutive win by Utah, the teams stopped playing each other in football.

As part of the 2010–13 NCAA conference realignment, both Utah and Colorado joined the Pac-12 in 2011 and were placed in its new South Division; they met that year on Black Friday in Salt Lake. The second game since the realignment was at Boulder and was the first Black Friday college football game to be telecast by the Fox Broadcasting Company.

Prior to the resumption of the rivalry, Colorado played Nebraska on Thanksgiving weekend since the formation of the Big 12 Conference in 1996 in front of a national television audience. Before 1996 in the Big Eight, Nebraska traditionally ended its regular season with rival Oklahoma, while CU often concluded with Kansas State or Iowa State. Utah traditionally played nearby rival BYU of Provo in the heated Holy War on Thanksgiving weekend; they have met every year since 1946 except 2014, and all but three years since 1922.

The Colorado–Nebraska football rivalry went on hold when Nebraska joined the Big Ten in 2011, while Utah's game with BYU was moved to mid-September. BYU left the Mountain West Conference to become a football independent in 2011, and joined the West Coast Conference for its other sports.

Despite the near half-century hiatus, the Colorado–Utah rivalry remains the fifth-most played rivalry in Utah's history, and the eighth-most played rivalry in Colorado's history.

== History ==
=== 1910–1947 ===
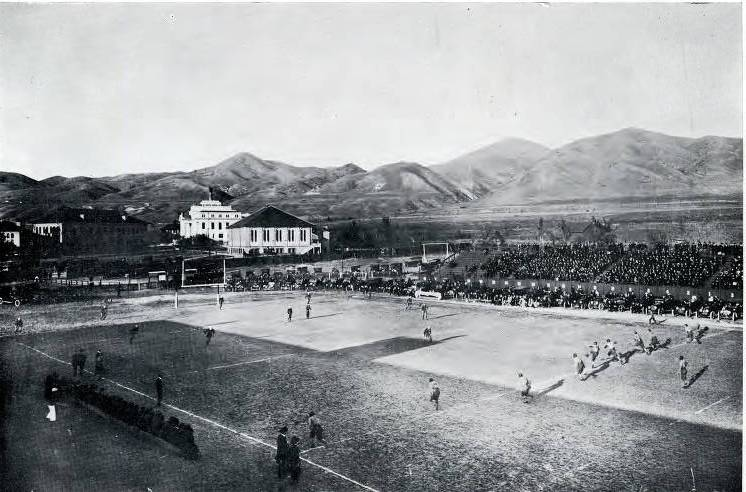
Kickoff during the 1916 Colorado – Utah game at Cummings Field in Salt Lake City

For 38 years, Utah and Colorado were members of the same conference. From 1910 to 1937, they both played in the Rocky Mountain Athletic Conference, and were both members of the Mountain States Athletic Conference from 1938 to 1947. Of those 38 seasons, either Utah or Colorado won at least a share of the conference title 27 times (Utah won 12 outright, and 3 shared; Colorado won 11 outright, and 2 shared). The two schools shared the Mountain States Conference title in 1942.

The most notable meetings during this era occurred in 1936 and 1937:

The 1936 match-up may have featured the greatest gridiron performance of Colorado halfback Byron "Whizzer" White. He ran for one touchdown from scrimmage that day, and threw for another. But the future Supreme Court justice was most dominant on special teams. As the punter, White kept Utah's offense backed up all game. And as a kick returner, he also returned one kickoff and two desperate Utah punts for touchdowns. Although Utah was favored to win, Colorado won 31–7. Utah's lone touchdown in the game was a kickoff return for a touchdown by Joseph Wirthlin.

In 1937, Colorado went into Salt Lake undefeated and unchallenged – having outscored opponents 162–6 en route to a 5–0 record. However, they found themselves trailing Utah at halftime 7–0. But from there, Whizzer White took control of the game. White first got CU on the board with a third-quarter field goal. Then, in the fourth quarter, White returned a Utah punt 95 yards for a touchdown (he also kicked the extra point). Moments later, White sealed the win with a 57-yard touchdown run from scrimmage (and again kicked the extra point). Final Score: Colorado 17, Utah 7. The Frontiersmen finished the regular season 8–0, but lost to Rice of Houston in the Cotton Bowl in Dallas. White was a runner-up on the Heisman Trophy ballot.

=== 1948–1962 ===
In 1948, Colorado left the Mountain States Conference to join the Big Eight Conference (then known as the Big Seven Conference). But for the next fourteen years, Utah and Colorado played each other nearly every year as part of the teams' non-conference schedules. It was during this time, Colorado began to dominate Utah, winning nine of the thirteen games played during this era, including eight in a row from 1949 to 1958.

The teams did not meet for two seasons and resumed in 1961 at Folsom Field in Boulder in perhaps the most noteworthy game of the series for two reasons: 1) the 1961 CU team was the most successful squad that either school had ever fielded; and 2) it was a monumental upset. #8 Colorado was the first to score, and they also added another touchdown in the final minutes. But Utah dominated the game in between Colorado's lone scores and won 21–12. Colorado finished the regular season with a 9–1 record, a #4 national ranking, a Big Eight title, and a berth in the Orange Bowl. Utah settled for the rivalry upset win and a 6–4 record.

Utah won again the following year 37–21 in Salt Lake, which was the last meeting for 49 years.

=== 2011–present ===
With both schools joining the Pac-12 in 2011, the rivalry resumed. The first matchup was a Black Friday game, a day in college football reserved for rivalry matchups; Colorado had a regular place on Black Friday since 1996, against then-division rival Nebraska. The conference realignments separated that rivalry and restarted the long-dormant Colorado–Utah series.

In the inaugural Pac-12 matchup in Salt Lake, Colorado won 17–14 at Rice–Eccles Stadium, ending Utah's chance at a possible berth in the first Pac-12 Championship Game. Had the Utes won, they would have represented the South Division against eventual conference champion Oregon. Utah got revenge the next year, beating Colorado 42–35 in Boulder in a close game.

Utah won again in 2013, defeating the Buffaloes 24–17 in Salt Lake City to ensure that Colorado finished last in the Pac-12 South. The 2014 game was another hard-fought game in Boulder swaying in the Utes' favor. Utah won 38–34, as Colorado went winless in conference play. In 2015, Utah won 20–14 in a hard-fought match in the snow, which led Utah to a co-championship of the South division. In 2016, Colorado experienced the greatest turnaround in the history of the Pac-12 Conference; the #9 Buffaloes defeated #21 Utah 27–22 to clinch an 8–1 conference record and south division title, a year after going 1–8 in conference play.

As Pac-12 members, Utah led the series 11–2 (.846); both joined the Big 12 in the summer of 2024.

== Game results ==
Colorado victories	Utah victories	Tie games

No.	Date	Location	Winner	Score
1	October 3, 1903	Boulder, CO	Colorado	22–0
2	October 1, 1904	Salt Lake City, UT	Colorado	33–6
3	November 4, 1905	Boulder, CO	Colorado	46–5
4	November 17, 1906	Salt Lake City, UT	Utah	10–0
5	November 16, 1907	Boulder, CO	Colorado	24–10
6	November 14, 1908	Salt Lake City, UT	Utah	21–14
7	October 29, 1910	Boulder, CO	Colorado	11–0
8	November 18, 1911	Salt Lake City, UT	Colorado	9–0
9	November 9, 1912	Denver, CO	Colorado	3–0
10	November 8, 1913	Salt Lake City, UT	Colorado	30–12
11	November 7, 1914	Boulder, CO	Colorado	33–0
12	October 30, 1915	Salt Lake City, UT	Utah	35–3
13	October 28, 1916	Salt Lake City, UT	Utah	28–0
14	November 10, 1917	Boulder, CO	Colorado	18–9
15	November 8, 1919	Salt Lake City, UT	Utah	7–0
16	November 6, 1920	Boulder, CO	Utah	7–0
17	November 12, 1921	Salt Lake City, UT	Tie	0–0
18	October 21, 1922	Boulder, CO	Utah	3–0
19	November 17, 1923	Salt Lake City, UT	Colorado	17–7
20	November 1, 1924	Boulder, CO	Colorado	3–0
21	October 24, 1925	Salt Lake City, UT	Utah	12–7
22	October 23, 1926	Boulder, CO	Utah	37–3
23	October 22, 1927	Salt Lake City, UT	Utah	20–13
24	October 27, 1928	Boulder, CO	Utah	25–6
25	October 19, 1929	Salt Lake City, UT	Utah	40–0
26	November 15, 1930	Boulder, CO	Utah	34–0
27	November 14, 1931	Salt Lake City, UT	Utah	32–0
28	November 5, 1932	Boulder, CO	Utah	14–0
29	November 11, 1933	Salt Lake City, UT	Utah	13–6
30	November 10, 1934	Boulder, CO	Colorado	7–6
31	November 9, 1935	Salt Lake City, UT	Colorado	14–0
32	November 7, 1936	Boulder, CO	Colorado	31–7
33	November 6, 1937	Salt Lake City, UT	Colorado	17–7
34	November 5, 1938	Boulder, CO	Tie	0–0
35	November 4, 1939	Salt Lake City, UT	Colorado	21–14
36	November 2, 1940	Boulder, CO	Utah	21–13
37	November 1, 1941	Salt Lake City, UT	Utah	46–6

No.	Date	Location	Winner	Score
38	November 7, 1942	Boulder, CO	Utah	13–0
39	October 9, 1943	Boulder, CO	Colorado	35–0
40	November 6, 1943	Salt Lake City, UT	Colorado	22–19
41	October 14, 1944	Salt Lake City, UT	Colorado	26–0
42	October 6, 1945	Boulder, CO	Colorado	18–13
43	November 2, 1946	Salt Lake City, UT	Utah	7–0
44	November 1, 1947	Boulder, CO	Utah	13–7
45	October 30, 1948	Salt Lake City, UT	Utah	14–12
46	October 29, 1949	Boulder, CO	Colorado	14–4
47	October 28, 1950	Salt Lake City, UT	Tie	20–20
48	November 10, 1951	Boulder, CO	Colorado	54–0
49	November 1, 1952	Salt Lake City, UT	Colorado	20–14
50	November 7, 1953	Boulder, CO	Colorado	21–0
51	November 13, 1954	Salt Lake City, UT	Colorado	20–7
52	November 5, 1955	Boulder, CO	Colorado	37–7
53	November 17, 1956	Salt Lake City, UT	Colorado	21–7
54	September 28, 1957	Boulder, CO	Colorado	30–24
55	November 15, 1958	Salt Lake City, UT	Colorado	7–0
56	November 11, 1961	Boulder, CO	Utah	21–12
57	September 22, 1962	Salt Lake City, UT	Utah	37–21
58	November 25, 2011	Salt Lake City, UT	Colorado	17–14
59	November 23, 2012	Boulder, CO	Utah	42–35
60	November 30, 2013	Salt Lake City, UT	Utah	24–17
61	November 29, 2014	Boulder, CO	#25 Utah	38–34
62	November 28, 2015	Salt Lake City, UT	#23 Utah	20–14
63	November 26, 2016	Boulder, CO	#9 Colorado	27–22
64	November 25, 2017	Salt Lake City, UT	Utah	34–13
65	November 17, 2018	Boulder, CO	#19 Utah	30–7
66	November 30, 2019	Salt Lake City, UT	#6 Utah	45–15
67	December 12, 2020	Boulder, CO	Utah	38–21
68	November 26, 2021	Salt Lake City, UT	#19 Utah	28–13
69	November 26, 2022	Boulder, CO	#14 Utah	63–21
70	November 25, 2023	Salt Lake City, UT	Utah	23–17
71	November 16, 2024	Boulder, CO	#17 Colorado	49–24
72	October 25, 2025	Salt Lake City, UT	Utah	53–7
73	October 17, 2026	Boulder, CO	#11 Utah	27–24
Series: Utah leads 37–33–3

== See also ==
- List of NCAA college football rivalry games
