= 1937 Akron Zippers football team =

American college football season

1937 Akron Zippers football
- Conference: Independent
- Record: 7–2
- Head coach: Jim Aiken (2nd season)
- Captain: William Sturgeon
- Home stadium: Buchtel Field

1937 Midwestern college football independents records
	Conf.			Overall
Team	W	L	T	W		L		T
Michigan State		–		8	–	2	–	0
Akron		–		7	–	2	–	0
Central Michigan		–		6	–	2	–	0
DePaul		–		5	–	1	–	2
Wayne		–		6	–	2	–	0
No. T–9 Notre Dame		–		6	–	2	–	1
Detroit		–		7	–	3	–	0
Michigan State Normal		–		5	–	2	–	1
Western State Teachers		–		5	–	3	–	0
Michigan Tech		–		4	–	3	–	0
Xavier		–		4	–	5	–	1
Marquette		–		3	–	6	–	0
Haskell		–		2	–	7	–	0
Rankings from AP Poll

The 1937 Akron Zippers football team was an American football team that represented the University of Akron as an independent during the 1937 college football season. In their second season under head coach Jim Aiken, the Zips compiled a 7–2 record and outscored opponents by a total of 139 to 53. William Sturgeon was the team captain.

== Schedule ==
Date	Opponent	Site	Result	Attendance	Source
September 25	West Liberty State	Buchtel Field; Akron, OH	W 40–7	5,200	
October 2	Wayne	Buchtel Field; Akron, OH	L 13–19		
October 9	Geneva	Buchtel Field; Akron, OH	W 7–0		
October 16	at Toledo	Glass Bowl; Toledo, OH	W 21–7		
October 23	Baldwin–Wallace	Buchtel Field; Akron, OH	W 7–0		
October 30	John Carroll	Buchtel Field; Akron, OH	W 6–0		
November 6	Davis & Elkins	Buchtel Field; Akron, OH	W 33–7		
November 13	Illinois Wesleyan	Buchtel Field; Akron, OH	W 12–7		
November 20	at Xavier	Corcoran Field; Cincinnati, OH	L 0–6		
