= 1937 Kansas State Wildcats football team =

American college football season

1937 Kansas State Wildcats football
- Conference: Big Six Conference
- Record: 4–5 (1–4 Big 6)
- Head coach: Wesley Fry (3rd season)
- Home stadium: Memorial Stadium

1937 Big Six Conference football standings
	Conf.					Overall
Team	W		L		T	W		L		T
No. 11 Nebraska $	3	–	0	–	2	6	–	1	–	2
Oklahoma	3	–	1	–	1	5	–	2	–	2
Kansas	2	–	1	–	2	3	–	4	–	2
Missouri	2	–	2	–	1	3	–	6	–	1
Iowa State	1	–	4	–	0	3	–	6	–	0
Kansas State	1	–	4	–	0	4	–	5	–	0
$ – Conference champion; Rankings from AP Poll

The 1937 Kansas State Wildcats football team represented Kansas State University in the 1937 college football season. The team's head football coach was Wesley Fry, in his third year at the helm of the Wildcats. The Wildcats played their home games at Memorial Stadium in Manhattan, Kansas.

Led by All-Conference back Elmer Hackney, Kansas State led the Big Six Conference in rushing offense and total offense in 1937. Nevertheless, the team finished the season with a 4–5 record and a 1–4 record in conference play, in a tie for last place. Despite a potent rushing game, the Wildcats scored only 76 points and gave up 84 points.

== Schedule ==
Date	Opponent	Site	Result	Attendance	Source
October 2	at Boston College*	Alumni Field; Chestnut Hill, MA	L 7–21	15,000	
October 9	at Missouri	Memorial Stadium; Columbia, MO	L 7–14		
October 16	Marquette*	Memorial Stadium; Manhattan, KS	W 13–0	3,500	
October 23	at Creighton*	Creighton Stadium; Omaha, NE	W 15–7	8,000	
October 30	Oklahoma^{†}	Memorial Stadium; Manhattan, KS	L 0–19	15,000	
November 6	Washburn*	Memorial Stadium; Manhattan, KS	W 20–7	5,000	
November 13	at Kansas	Memorial Stadium; Lawrence, KS (rivalry)	W 7–0	19,000	
November 20	at Iowa State	State Field; Ames, IA (rivalry)	L 7–13	3,157	
November 27	No. 11 Nebraska	Memorial Stadium; Manhattan, KS (rivalry)	L 0–3	5,000	
*Non-conference game; ^{†}Homecoming; Rankings from AP Poll released prior to the game
