= 1937 Central Michigan Bearcats football team =

American college football season

1937 Central Michigan Bearcats football
- Conference: Independent
- Record: 6–2
- Head coach: Ron Finch (1st season)
- Home stadium: Alumni Field

1937 Midwestern college football independents records
	Conf.			Overall
Team	W	L	T	W		L		T
Michigan State		–		8	–	2	–	0
Akron		–		7	–	2	–	0
Central Michigan		–		6	–	2	–	0
DePaul		–		5	–	1	–	2
Wayne		–		6	–	2	–	0
No. T–9 Notre Dame		–		6	–	2	–	1
Detroit		–		7	–	3	–	0
Michigan State Normal		–		5	–	2	–	1
Western State Teachers		–		5	–	3	–	0
Michigan Tech		–		4	–	3	–	0
Xavier		–		4	–	5	–	1
Marquette		–		3	–	6	–	0
Haskell		–		2	–	7	–	0
Rankings from AP Poll

The 1937 Central Michigan Bearcats football team represented Central Michigan College of Education, later renamed Central Michigan University, as an independent during the 1937 college football season. In their first season under head coach Ron Finch, the Bearcats compiled a 6–2 record, shut out four of eight opponents, held six opponents to seven or fewer points, and outscored their opponents by a combined total of 202 to 41. The team's sole losses were to Wayne State (0–18) and Western State (0–7).

Coach Finch was hired as the school's head coach in March 1937. He was a Central Michigan alumnus who had coached at high schools in Saginaw, St. Joseph, and Lowell, Michigan.

== Schedule ==
Date	Opponent	Site	Result	Source
September 25	Assumption (ON)	Alumni Field; Mount Pleasant, MI	W 52–0	
October 2	at Ferris Institute	Big Rapids, MI	W 21–7	
October 9	Northern State Teachers^{†}	Mount Pleasant, MI	W 32–0	
October 16	Wayne	Alumni Field; Mount Pleasant, MI	L 0–18	
October 23	at Michigan State Normal	Normal Field; Ypsilanti, MI (rivalry)	W 27–10	
October 30	at St. Mary's (MI)	Orchard Lake, MI	W 38–0	
November 6	Western State Teachers (MI)	Alumni Field; Mount Pleasant, MI (rivalry)	L 0–7	
November 13	at Kalamazoo	Kalamazoo, MI	W 30–0	
^{†}Homecoming
