= 1937 Iowa State Cyclones football team =

American college football season

1937 Iowa State Cyclones football
- Conference: Big Six Conference
- Record: 3–6 (1–4 Big 6)
- Head coach: James J. Yeager (1st season)
- Captain: Clarence Dee
- Home stadium: State Field

1937 Big Six Conference football standings
	Conf.					Overall
Team	W		L		T	W		L		T
No. 11 Nebraska $	3	–	0	–	2	6	–	1	–	2
Oklahoma	3	–	1	–	1	5	–	2	–	2
Kansas	2	–	1	–	2	3	–	4	–	2
Missouri	2	–	2	–	1	3	–	6	–	1
Iowa State	1	–	4	–	0	3	–	6	–	0
Kansas State	1	–	4	–	0	4	–	5	–	0
$ – Conference champion; Rankings from AP Poll

The 1937 Iowa State Cyclones football team represented Iowa State College of Agricultural and Mechanic Arts (later renamed Iowa State University) in the Big Six Conference during the 1937 college football season. In their first season under head coach James J. Yeager, the Cyclones compiled a 3–6 record (1–4 against conference opponents), tied for last place in the conference, and were outscored by opponents by a combined total of 161 to 50. They played their home games at State Field in Ames, Iowa.

Clarence Dee was the team captain. Two Iowa State players were selected as first-team all-conference players: guard Ed Bock and back Everett Kischer. Joe Truskowski and Cap Timm were the assistant coaches.

== Schedule ==
Date	Time	Opponent	Site	Result	Attendance	Source
September 25	2:00 pm	Iowa State Teachers*	State Field; Ames, IA	W 14–12	5,096	
October 2	2:00 pm	at Northwestern	Dyche Stadium; Evanston, IL	L 0–33	37,673	
October 9	2:00 pm	Nebraska	State Field; Ames, IA (rivalry)	L 7–20	7,756	
October 16	2:00 pm	at Kansas	Memorial Stadium; Lawrence, KS	L 6–14	7,000	
October 23	2:00 pm	at Drake*	Drake Stadium; Des Moines, IA	L 0–30	8,781	
October 30	2:00 pm	Missouri^{†}	State Field; Ames, IA (rivalry)	L 0–12	9,082	
November 6	2:00 pm	at Oklahoma	Oklahoma Memorial Stadium; Norman, OK	L 7–33	8,194	
November 13	2:00 pm	at Marquette*	Marquette Stadium; Milwaukee, WI	W 3–0	8,000	
November 20	2:00 pm	Kansas State	State Field; Ames, IA (rivalry)	W 13–7	3,157	
*Non-conference game; ^{†}Homecoming; All times are in Central time
