= 1937 Western State Teachers Hilltoppers football team =

American college football season

1937 Western State Teachers Hilltoppers football
- Conference: Independent
- Record: 5–3
- Head coach: Mike Gary (9th season)
- Captain: George Bond

1937 Midwestern college football independents records
	Conf.			Overall
Team	W	L	T	W		L		T
Michigan State		–		8	–	2	–	0
Akron		–		7	–	2	–	0
Central Michigan		–		6	–	2	–	0
DePaul		–		5	–	1	–	2
Wayne		–		6	–	2	–	0
No. T–9 Notre Dame		–		6	–	2	–	1
Detroit		–		7	–	3	–	0
Michigan State Normal		–		5	–	2	–	1
Western State Teachers		–		5	–	3	–	0
Michigan Tech		–		4	–	3	–	0
Xavier		–		4	–	5	–	1
Marquette		–		3	–	6	–	0
Haskell		–		2	–	7	–	0
Rankings from AP Poll

The 1937 Western State Teachers Hilltoppers football team represented Western State Teachers College (later renamed Western Michigan University) as an independent during the 1937 college football season. In their ninth season under head coach Mike Gary, the Broncos compiled a 5–3 record and outscored their opponents, 92 to 65. Quarterback George Bond was the team captain.

== Schedule ==
Date	Opponent	Site	Result	Attendance	Source
October 1	at Detroit	University of Detroit Stadium; Detroit, MI	L 7–20	14,000	
October 9	Illinois College	Western State Teachers College Field; Kalamazoo, MI	W 37–0		
October 16	at Iowa State Teachers	O. R. Latham Stadium; Cedar Falls, IA	W 7–0		
October 23	St. Viator	Western State Teachers College Field; Kalamazoo, MI	L 7–13		
October 30	Western Kentucky State Teachers	Western State Teachers College Field; Kalamazoo, MI	W 13–7		
November 6	at Central Michigan	Alumni Field; Mount Pleasant, MI (rivalry)	W 7–0		
November 13	at Butler	Butler Bowl; Indianapolis, IN	W 14–13		
November 20	DePaul	Western State Teachers College Field; Kalamazoo, MI	L 12–0		
