= 1937 South Dakota Coyotes football team =

American college football season

1937 South Dakota Coyotes football
- Conference: North Central Conference
- Record: 6–4 (4–1 NCC)
- Head coach: Harry Gamage (4th season)
- Home stadium: Inman Field

1937 North Central Conference football standings
	Conf.					Overall
Team	W		L		T	W		L		T
North Dakota $	3	–	0	–	0	4	–	4	–	0
South Dakota	4	–	1	–	0	6	–	4	–	0
Morningside	2	–	2	–	1	4	–	2	–	2
North Dakota Agricultural	2	–	2	–	0	5	–	4	–	0
Iowa State Teachers	2	–	2	–	1	2	–	4	–	3
South Dakota State	2	–	3	–	0	4	–	5	–	0
Omaha	0	–	5	–	0	2	–	6	–	0
$ – Conference champion

The 1937 South Dakota Coyotes football team was an American football team that represented the University of South Dakota in the North Central Conference (NCC) during the 1937 college football season. In its fourth season under head coach Harry Gamage, the team compiled a 6–4 record (4–1 against NCC opponents), finished in second place out of seven teams in the NCC, and outscored opponents by a total of 159 to 65. The team played its home games at Inman Field in Vermillion, South Dakota.

== Schedule ==
Date	Opponent	Site	Result	Attendance	Source
September 18	Buena Vista*	Inman Field; Vermillion, SD	W 48–7		
September 25	Wayne Teachers (NE)*	Inman Field; Vermillion, SD	W 25–7		
October 1	at North Dakota	Memorial Stadium; Grand Forks, ND (rivalry)	L 7–13		
October 8	at Marquette*	Marquette Stadium; Milwaukee, WI	L 6–7	8,000	
October 15	at Saint Louis*	Walsh Stadium; St. Louis, MO	L 0–9		
October 23	at Morningside	Yards Park; Sioux City, IA	W 16–0	4,000	
October 30	South Dakota State	Inman Field; Vermillion, SD (Dakota Day, rivalry)	W 12–2	5,000	
November 6	Omaha	Inman Field; Vermillion, SD	W 26–0	3,000	
November 13	Iowa State Teachers	Inman Field; Vermillion, SD	W 13–0		
November 25	at Louisiana Tech*	Tech Field; Ruston, LA	L 6–20	4,500	
*Non-conference game
