= 1938 Kent State Golden Flashes football team =

American college football season

1938 Kent State Golden Flashes football
- Conference: Ohio Athletic Conference
- Record: 6–2 (3–2 OAC)
- Head coach: Donald Starn (4th season)
- Home stadium: Rockwell Field

1938 Ohio Athletic Conference football standings
| | Conf. | | | | | Overall |
| Team | W | | L | | T | W | | L | | T |
|---|---|---|---|---|---|---|---|---|---|---|
| Wooster $ | 5 | – | 0 | – | 2 | 5 | – | 0 | – | 3 |
| John Carroll | 4 | – | 0 | – | 2 | 6 | – | 2 | – | 1 |
| Ohio Northern | 6 | – | 1 | – | 1 | 6 | – | 1 | – | 1 |
| Capital | 5 | – | 1 | – | 1 | 6 | – | 1 | – | 1 |
| Denison | 5 | – | 2 | – | 0 | 7 | – | 2 | – | 0 |
| Mount Union | 4 | – | 2 | – | 0 | 5 | – | 3 | – | 0 |
| Muskingum | 4 | – | 2 | – | 1 | 5 | – | 3 | – | 1 |
| Wittenberg | 4 | – | 2 | – | 0 | 4 | – | 4 | – | 0 |
| Baldwin–Wallace | 2 | – | 1 | – | 0 | 3 | – | 5 | – | 0 |
| Kent State | 3 | – | 2 | – | 0 | 6 | – | 2 | – | 0 |
| Toledo | 0 | – | 0 | – | 1 | 6 | – | 3 | – | 1 |
| Bowling Green | 2 | – | 2 | – | 2 | 3 | – | 2 | – | 3 |
| Case | 2 | – | 2 | – | 1 | 2 | – | 4 | – | 2 |
| Oberlin | 1 | – | 4 | – | 0 | 3 | – | 4 | – | 1 |
| Findlay | 1 | – | 4 | – | 0 | 3 | – | 5 | – | 0 |
| Kenyon | 1 | – | 4 | – | 0 | 1 | – | 5 | – | 0 |
| Marietta | 1 | – | 4 | – | 0 | 1 | – | 6 | – | 0 |
| Otterbein | 1 | – | 5 | – | 0 | 2 | – | 6 | – | 0 |
| Heidelberg | 1 | – | 7 | – | 0 | 1 | – | 8 | – | 0 |
| Ashland | 0 | – | 7 | – | 0 | 0 | – | 7 | – | 0 |
$ – Conference champion

The 1938 Kent State Golden Flashes football team was an American football team that represented Kent State University in the Ohio Athletic Conference (OAC) during the 1938 college football season. In its fourth season under head coach Donald Starn, Kent State compiled a 6–2 record (3–2 against OAC opponents) and outscored all opponents by a total of 174 to 69. The team opened the season with five consecutive victories, including back-to-back shutouts over Alfred Holbrook (49–0) and Buffalo (54–0). The team's 54 points scored against Buffalo was the most in school history to that point and also included a school record for most points in a quarter (27 points in the third quarter). The team then lost two of its last three games, including a 7–3 loss in the 10th match in its rivalry with Bowling Green.

== Schedule ==
| Date | Opponent | Site | Result | Attendance | Source |
|---|---|---|---|---|---|
| September 24 | Albion* | Rockwell Field; Kent, OH | W 17–0 | | |
| October 1 | at Heidelberg | Tiffin, OH | W 22–6 | | |
| October 7 | at Findlay | Findlay, OH | W 13–7 | | |
| October 15 | Alfred Holbrook* | Rockwell Field; Kent, OH | W 49–0 | | |
| October 22 | Buffalo* | Rockwell Field; Kent, OH | W 54–0 | | |
| October 28 | at John Carroll | Cleveland Stadium; Cleveland, Ohio | L 6–27 | | |
| November 5 | at Bowling Green | Bowling Green, OH (rivalry) | W 7–3 | 5,000 | |
| November 12 | Baldwin–Wallace | Bowers Field; Kent, OH | L 6–26 | | |
*Non-conference game
