= 1937 Haskell Indians football team =

American college football season

1937 Haskell Indians football
- Conference: Independent
- Record: 2–7
- Head coach: Jack Carmody (2nd season)
- Captain: Robert Summers

1937 Midwestern college football independents records
	Conf.			Overall
Team	W	L	T	W		L		T
Michigan State		–		8	–	2	–	0
Akron		–		7	–	2	–	0
Central Michigan		–		6	–	2	–	0
DePaul		–		5	–	1	–	2
Wayne		–		6	–	2	–	0
No. T–9 Notre Dame		–		6	–	2	–	1
Detroit		–		7	–	3	–	0
Michigan State Normal		–		5	–	2	–	1
Western State Teachers		–		5	–	3	–	0
Michigan Tech		–		4	–	3	–	0
Xavier		–		4	–	5	–	1
Marquette		–		3	–	6	–	0
Haskell		–		2	–	7	–	0
Rankings from AP Poll

The 1937 Haskell Indians football team was an American football that represented the Haskell Institute—now known as Haskell Indian Nations University—as an independent during the 1937 college football season. Led by second-year head coach Jack Carmody, Haskell compiled a record of 2–7.

== Schedule ==
Date	Opponent	Site	Result	Source
October 1	at Loras	Dubuque, IA	L 7–20	
October 7	at Kansas Wesleyan	Salina, KS	L 0–20	
October 16	at Omaha	Benson High School field; Omaha, NE	L 0–28	
October 22	Baker	Lawrence, KS	W 12–7	
October 29	at Midland	Fremont, NE	L 0–24	
November 6	at Southwestern (KS)	Winfield, KS	L 6–19	
November 11	at McPherson	McPherson, KS	W 7–0	
November 25	at Missouri Valley	Marshall, MO	L 0–44	
