= 1937 Notre Dame Fighting Irish football team =

American college football season

1937 Notre Dame Fighting Irish football
- Conference: Independent

Ranking
- AP: No. T–9
- Record: 6–2–1
- Head coach: Elmer Layden (4th season)
- Captain: Joe Zwers
- Home stadium: Notre Dame Stadium

1937 Midwestern college football independents records
	Conf.			Overall
Team	W	L	T	W		L		T
Michigan State		–		8	–	2	–	0
Akron		–		7	–	2	–	0
Central Michigan		–		6	–	2	–	0
DePaul		–		5	–	1	–	2
Wayne		–		6	–	2	–	0
No. T–9 Notre Dame		–		6	–	2	–	1
Detroit		–		7	–	3	–	0
Michigan State Normal		–		5	–	2	–	1
Western State Teachers		–		5	–	3	–	0
Michigan Tech		–		4	–	3	–	0
Xavier		–		4	–	5	–	1
Marquette		–		3	–	6	–	0
Haskell		–		2	–	7	–	0
Rankings from AP Poll

The 1937 Notre Dame Fighting Irish football team was an American football team that represented the University of Notre Dame as an independent during the 1937 college football season. In their fourth season under head coach Elmer Layden, the Irish compiled a 6–2–1 record, outscored opponents by a low-scoring total of 77 to 49, and were ranked No. 9 in the final AP poll. They opened the season with a disappointing 1–1–1 record, after tying Illini and losing to Carnegie Tech; they thereafter won five of the final six games, including victories over No. 4 Minnesota, Army, and USC, and a loss to No. 3 Pittsburgh.

End Chuck Sweeney, who returned a blocked punt for the game-winning touchdown against Northwestern, was a consensus first-team pick on the 1937 All-America college football team. Tackle Ed Beinor also received first-team All-America honors from the All-America Board and Newspaper Enterprise Association. Quarterback Andy Puplis and guard Joe Ruetz received third-team honors. End Joe Zwers was the team captain.

The team played its home games at Notre Dame Stadium in Notre Dame, Indiana.

== Schedule ==
Date	Opponent	Rank	Site	Result	Attendance	Source
October 2	Drake		Notre Dame Stadium; Notre Dame, IN	W 21–0	41,000	
October 9	at Illinois		Memorial Stadium; Champaign, IL	T 0–0	42,253–45,000	
October 16	at Carnegie Tech		Pittsburgh, PA	L 7–9	30,418–45,000	
October 23	Navy		Notre Dame Stadium; Notre Dame, IN (rivalry)	W 9–7	45,000	
October 30	at No. 4 Minnesota		Memorial Stadium; Minneapolis, MN	W 7–6	63,237–64,100	
November 6	No. 3 Pittsburgh	No. 12	Notre Dame Stadium; Notre Dame, IN (rivalry)	L 6–21	54,309	
November 13	vs. Army	No. 18	Yankee Stadium; Bronx, NY (rivalry)	W 7–0	76,359	
November 20	at Northwestern	No. 12	Dyche Stadium; Evanston, IL (rivalry)	W 7–0	42,573–45,000	
November 27	USC	No. 9	Notre Dame Stadium; Notre Dame, IN (rivalry)	W 13–6	28,920–40,000	
Rankings from AP Poll released prior to the game; Source:

== Personnel ==
=== Players ===
- Ed Beinor, left tackle
- Joe Kuharich, right guard
- McCarty, center
- Jack McCarthy, left halfback
- Pat McCarthy
- Bunny McCormick, right halfback
- Chuck O'Reilly
- Reinor, left tackle
- Andy Puplis, quarterback
- Joe Ruetz, left guard
- Alec Shellogg, right tackle
- Ed Simonich, fullback
- Len Skoglund, left end
- Chuck Sweeney, right end
- Joe Thesing, fullback
- Mario Tonelli, fullback
- Joseph B. "Red" Zwers, right end and captain

=== Coaching staff ===
- Head coach: Elmer Layden
- Athletic director: Elmer Layden
- Line coach: Joe Boland
- Ends coach Joe Benda
