= 1937 Kansas Jayhawks football team =

American college football season

1937 Kansas Jayhawks football
- Conference: Big Six Conference
- Record: 3–4–2 (2–1–2 Big 6)
- Head coach: Adrian Lindsey (6th season)
- Captain: George Stapleton
- Home stadium: Memorial Stadium

1937 Big Six Conference football standings
	Conf.					Overall
Team	W		L		T	W		L		T
No. 11 Nebraska $	3	–	0	–	2	6	–	1	–	2
Oklahoma	3	–	1	–	1	5	–	2	–	2
Kansas	2	–	1	–	2	3	–	4	–	2
Missouri	2	–	2	–	1	3	–	6	–	1
Iowa State	1	–	4	–	0	3	–	6	–	0
Kansas State	1	–	4	–	0	4	–	5	–	0
$ – Conference champion; Rankings from AP Poll

The 1937 Kansas Jayhawks football team represented the University of Kansas in the Big Six Conference during the 1937 college football season. In their sixth season under head coach Adrian Lindsey, the Jayhawks compiled a 3–4–2 record (2–1–2 against conference opponents), finished in third place in the conference, and were outscored by opponents by a combined total of 74 to 72. They played their home games at Memorial Stadium in Lawrence, Kansas.

The team's statistical leaders included Clarence Douglass with 376 rushing yards and 27 points scored (four touchdowns and three extra points), Lyman Diven with 207 passing yards, Max Replogle with 180 receiving yards. George Stapleton was the team captain.

== Schedule ==
Date	Opponent	Site	Result	Attendance	Source
October 1	at Washburn*	Moore Bowl; Topeka, KS	W 25–2		
October 9	at Wichita*	Wichita University Stadium; Wichita, KS	L 7–18	7,500	
October 16	Iowa State	Memorial Stadium; Lawrence, KS	W 14–6	7,000	
October 23	at Oklahoma	Owen Field; Norman, OK	W 6–3	5,000	
October 30	at Michigan State*	Macklin Field; East Lansing, MI	L 0–16	10,000	
November 6	at No. 6 Nebraska	Memorial Stadium; Lincoln, NE (rivalry)	T 13–13	35,000	
November 13	Kansas State	Memorial Stadium; Lawrence, KS (rivalry)	L 0–7	19,000	
November 20	at Arizona*	Arizona Stadium; Tucson, AZ	L 7–9	9,000	
November 25	Missouri^{†}	Memorial Stadium; Lawrence, KS (rivalry)	T 0–0	22,000–23,000	
*Non-conference game; ^{†}Homecoming; Rankings from AP Poll released prior to the game

== After the season ==
=== NFL draft ===
The following Jayhawk was selected in the 1938 NFL draft following the season.

Round	Pick	Player	Position	NFL club
9	76	Clarence Douglass	Back	Detroit Lions
