= 1938 Bowling Green Falcons football team =

American college football season

1938 Bowling Green Falcons football
- Conference: Ohio Athletic Conference
- Record: 3–2–3 (2–2–2 OAC)
- Head coach: Harry Ockerman (4th season)
- Captain: Wayne Stewart
- Home stadium: University Stadium

1938 Ohio Athletic Conference football standings
	Conf.					Overall
Team	W		L		T	W		L		T
Wooster $	5	–	0	–	2	5	–	0	–	3
John Carroll	4	–	0	–	2	6	–	2	–	1
Ohio Northern	6	–	1	–	1	6	–	1	–	1
Capital	5	–	1	–	1	6	–	1	–	1
Denison	5	–	2	–	0	7	–	2	–	0
Mount Union	4	–	2	–	0	5	–	3	–	0
Muskingum	4	–	2	–	1	5	–	3	–	1
Wittenberg	4	–	2	–	0	4	–	4	–	0
Baldwin–Wallace	2	–	1	–	0	3	–	5	–	0
Kent State	3	–	2	–	0	6	–	2	–	0
Toledo	0	–	0	–	1	6	–	3	–	1
Bowling Green	2	–	2	–	2	3	–	2	–	3
Case	2	–	2	–	1	2	–	4	–	2
Oberlin	1	–	4	–	0	3	–	4	–	1
Findlay	1	–	4	–	0	3	–	5	–	0
Kenyon	1	–	4	–	0	1	–	5	–	0
Marietta	1	–	4	–	0	1	–	6	–	0
Otterbein	1	–	5	–	0	2	–	6	–	0
Heidelberg	1	–	7	–	0	1	–	8	–	0
Ashland	0	–	7	–	0	0	–	7	–	0
$ – Conference champion

The 1938 Bowling Green Falcons football team was an American football team that represented Bowling Green State College (later renamed Bowling Green State University) in the Ohio Athletic Conference (OAC) during the 1938 college football season. In their fourth season under head coach Harry Ockerman, the Cardinals compiled a 3–2–3 record (2–2–2 against OAC opponents), finished in eleventh place out of 19 teams in the OAC, and outscored opponents by a total of 95 to 41. Wayne Stewart was the team captain. The team played its home games at University Stadium in Bowling Green, Ohio.

== Schedule ==
Date	Opponent	Site	Result	Attendance	Source
September 24	at Capital	Bexley, OH	T 0–0		
September 30	at John Carroll	Cleveland, OH	L 0–20	2,000	
October 8	Ashland	University Stadium; Bowling Green, OH	W 50–0	2,500	
October 15	Wittenberg	University Stadium; Bowling Green, OH	W 7–0	3,500	
October 22	at Ohio Northern	Ada, OH	T 0–0		
October 29	Michigan State Normal*	University Stadium; Bowling Green, OH	T 7–7	3,000	
November 5	Kent State	University Stadium; Bowling Green, OH (rivalry)	L 3–7	5,000	
November 12	at Hiram*	Hiram, OH	W 28–7		
*Non-conference game
