= 1937 Oklahoma A&M Cowboys football team =

American college football season

1937 Oklahoma A&M Cowboys football
- Conference: Missouri Valley Conference
- Record: 4–6 (2–2 MVC)
- Head coach: Ted Cox (2nd season)
- Home stadium: Lewis Field

1937 Missouri Valley Conference football standings
	Conf.					Overall
Team	W		L		T	W		L		T
Tulsa $	3	–	0	–	0	6	–	2	–	2
Drake	4	–	1	–	0	8	–	2	–	0
Saint Louis	2	–	1	–	0	7	–	2	–	1
Oklahoma A&M	2	–	2	–	0	4	–	6	–	0
Washington University	2	–	2	–	0	4	–	6	–	0
Grinnell	1	–	3	–	0	2	–	6	–	1
Creighton	1	–	3	–	0	2	–	7	–	0
Washburn	0	–	3	–	0	0	–	10	–	0
$ – Conference champion

The 1937 Oklahoma A&M Cowboys football team represented Oklahoma A&M College in the 1937 college football season. This was the 37th year of football at A&M and the second under Ted Cox. The Cowboys played their home games at Lewis Field in Stillwater, Oklahoma. They finished the season 4–6, 2–2 in the Missouri Valley Conference.

== Schedule ==
Date	Time	Opponent	Site	Result	Attendance	Source
September 25		at Wichita*	Wichita, KS	W 14–8		
October 1		Creighton	Lewis Field; Stillwater, OK	W 16–13		
October 9		vs. Arizona*	Phoenix Union High School; Phoenix, AZ	L 13–22	12,000	
October 15		at Washburn	Moore Bowl; Topeka, KS	W 25–3		
October 23		at Tulsa	Skelly Field; Tulsa, OK (rivalry)	L 0–27	17,000	
October 30		Texas Tech*	Lewis Field; Stillwater, MO	L 6–14	6,000	
November 5	8:15 p.m.	at Washington University	Francis Field; St. Louis, MO	L 0–12	5,000	
November 13		Oklahoma City*^{†}	Lewis Field; Stillwater, OK	W 27–7		
November 20	2:00 p.m.	at Oklahoma*	Memorial Stadium; Norman, OK (Bedlam Series)	L 0–16	15,000–16,000	
November 27		Centenary*	Lewis Field; Stillwater, OK	L 0–19		
*Non-conference game; ^{†}Homecoming; All times are in Central time
