= 1937 Baylor Bears football team =

American college football season

1937 Baylor Bears football
- Conference: Southwest Conference
- Record: 7–3 (3–3 SWC)
- Head coach: Morley Jennings (12th season)
- Captain: Carl Brazell
- Home stadium: Waco Stadium

1937 Southwest Conference football standings
	Conf.					Overall
Team	W		L		T	W		L		T
No. 18 Rice $	4	–	1	–	1	6	–	3	–	2
No. 16 TCU	3	–	1	–	2	4	–	4	–	2
No. T–14 Arkansas	3	–	2	–	1	6	–	2	–	2
Baylor	3	–	3	–	0	7	–	3	–	0
Texas A&M	2	–	2	–	2	5	–	2	–	2
SMU	2	–	4	–	0	5	–	6	–	0
Texas	1	–	5	–	0	2	–	6	–	1
$ – Conference champion; Rankings from AP Poll

The 1937 Baylor Bears football team season represented Baylor University in the Southwest Conference (SWC) during the 1937 college football season. In their 12th season under head coach Morley Jennings, the Bears compiled a 7–3 record (3–3 against conference opponents), were ranked No. 4 in the weekly AP Poll after winning their first six games, lost three of their last four games, finished in fourth place in the conference, and outscored opponents by a combined total of 178 to 64. They played their home games at Waco Stadium in Waco, Texas. Carl Brazell was the team captain.

== Schedule ==
Date	Opponent	Rank	Site	Result	Attendance	Source
September 25	Southwestern (TX)*		Waco Stadium; Waco, TX	W 39–2		
October 1	at Oklahoma City*		Taft Stadium; Oklahoma City, OK	W 33–0		
October 9	Arkansas		Waco Stadium; Waco, TX	W 20–14		
October 16	at Centenary*		Centenary Field; Shreveport, LA	W 20–0		
October 23	at No. 13 Texas A&M	No. 15	Kyle Field; College Station, TX	W 13–0	17,000	
October 30	TCU^{†}	No. 6	Waco Stadium; Waco, TX (rivalry)	W 6–0	17,000	
November 6	Texas	No. 4	Waco Stadium; Waco, TX (rivalry)	L 6–9		
November 13	at SMU	No. 13	Ownby Stadium; University Park, TX	L 7–13		
November 20	vs. Loyola (CA)		Magnolia Park; Beaumont, TX	W 27–13	5,500	
November 27	at Rice		Rice Field; Houston, TX	L 7–13	20,000	
*Non-conference game; ^{†}Homecoming; Rankings from AP Poll released prior to the game
