= 1937 Xavier Musketeers football team =

American college football season

1937 Xavier Musketeers football
- Conference: Independent
- Record: 4–5–1
- Head coach: Clem Crowe (3rd season)
- Home stadium: Corcoran Field

1937 Midwestern college football independents records
	Conf.			Overall
Team	W	L	T	W		L		T
Michigan State		–		8	–	2	–	0
Akron		–		7	–	2	–	0
Central Michigan		–		6	–	2	–	0
DePaul		–		5	–	1	–	2
Wayne		–		6	–	2	–	0
No. T–9 Notre Dame		–		6	–	2	–	1
Detroit		–		7	–	3	–	0
Michigan State Normal		–		5	–	2	–	1
Western State Teachers		–		5	–	3	–	0
Michigan Tech		–		4	–	3	–	0
Xavier		–		4	–	5	–	1
Marquette		–		3	–	6	–	0
Haskell		–		2	–	7	–	0
Rankings from AP Poll

The 1937 Xavier Musketeers football team was an American football team that represented Xavier University as an independent during the 1937 college football season. In their third year under head coach Clem Crowe, the Musketeers compiled a 4–5–1 record.

== Schedule ==
Date	Time	Opponent	Site	Result	Attendance	Source
September 25		Transylvania	Corcoran Field; Cincinnati, OH	W 43–0		
October 2		Kentucky	Corcoran Field; Cincinnati, OH	L 0–6		
October 8		at Providence	Cranston Stadium; Cranston, RI	L 6–7	8,000	
October 16		West Virginia	Corcoran Field; Cincinnati, OH	L 7–13	6,000	
October 24		at Canisius	Roesch Memorial Stadium; Buffalo, NY	T 0–0	2,600	
October 30	2:30 p.m.	Centre	Corcoran Field; Cincinnati, OH	L 0–21	5,000	
November 6		Creighton	Corcoran Field; Cincinnati, OH	W 19–0		
November 13		at Baldwin–Wallace	Baldwin–Wallace Stadium; Berea, OH	L 12–20	4,200	
November 20		Akron	Corcoran Field; Cincinnati, OH	W 6–0		
November 25		Toledo	Corcoran Field; Cincinnati, OH	W 8–6	8,500	
All times are in Eastern time
