= 1937 North Dakota Agricultural Bison football team =

American college football season

1937 North Dakota Agricultural Bison football
- Conference: North Central Conference
- Record: 5–4 (2–2 NCC)
- Head coach: Casey Finnegan (9th season)
- Captains: Forrest Stevens; Emil May
- Home stadium: Dacotah Field

1937 North Central Conference football standings
	Conf.					Overall
Team	W		L		T	W		L		T
North Dakota $	3	–	0	–	0	4	–	4	–	0
South Dakota	4	–	1	–	0	6	–	4	–	0
Morningside	2	–	2	–	1	4	–	2	–	2
North Dakota Agricultural	2	–	2	–	0	5	–	4	–	0
Iowa State Teachers	2	–	2	–	1	2	–	4	–	3
South Dakota State	2	–	3	–	0	4	–	5	–	0
Omaha	0	–	5	–	0	2	–	6	–	0
$ – Conference champion

The 1937 North Dakota Agricultural Bison football team was an American football team that represented North Dakota Agricultural College (now known as North Dakota State University) in the North Central Conference (NCC) during the 1937 college football season. In its ninth season under head coach Casey Finnegan, the team compiled a 5–4 record (2–2 against NCC opponents) and finished in fourth place out of seven teams in the NCC. The team played its home games at Dacotah Field in Fargo, North Dakota.

== Schedule ==
Date	Opponent	Site	Result	Attendance	Source
September 17	Omaha	Dacotah Field; Fargo, ND	W 34–7		
September 25	at Minnesota*	Memorial Stadium; Minneapolis, MN	L 7–69	47,492	
October 1	Morningside	Dacotah Field; Fargo, ND	W 33–6		
October 9	South Dakota State	Dacotah Field; Fargo, ND (rivalry)	L 6–13		
October 16	at Carleton*	Laird Field; Northfield, MN	W 6–0		
October 22	at Moorhead State*	Moorhead, MN	W 13–6		
October 30	at North Dakota	Memorial Stadium; Grand Forks, ND (rivalry)	L 0–27		
November 6	at Colorado State–Greeley*	Jackson Field; Greeley, CO	W 15–12		
November 13	at George Washington*	Griffith Stadium; Washington, DC	L 0–33		
*Non-conference game
