= 1937 TCU Horned Frogs football team =

American college football season

1937 TCU Horned Frogs football
- Conference: Southwest Conference

Ranking
- AP: No. 16
- Record: 4–4–2 (3–1–2 SWC)
- Head coach: Dutch Meyer (4th season)
- Offensive scheme: Meyer spread
- Home stadium: Amon G. Carter Stadium

1937 Southwest Conference football standings
	Conf.					Overall
Team	W		L		T	W		L		T
No. 18 Rice $	4	–	1	–	1	6	–	3	–	2
No. 16 TCU	3	–	1	–	2	4	–	4	–	2
No. T–14 Arkansas	3	–	2	–	1	6	–	2	–	2
Baylor	3	–	3	–	0	7	–	3	–	0
Texas A&M	2	–	2	–	2	5	–	2	–	2
SMU	2	–	4	–	0	5	–	6	–	0
Texas	1	–	5	–	0	2	–	6	–	1
$ – Conference champion; Rankings from AP Poll

The 1937 TCU Horned Frogs football team represented Texas Christian University (TCU) in the 1937 college football season. The team was coached by Dutch Meyer in his fourth year as head coach, finishing the season 4–4–2 (3–1–2 SWC). The offense scored 89 points while the defense allowed 72 points. The Frogs played their home games in Amon G. Carter Stadium, which is located on campus in Fort Worth, Texas.

== Schedule ==
Date	Opponent	Rank	Site	Result	Attendance	Source
September 25	at Ohio State*		Ohio Stadium; Columbus, OH	L 0–14	68,291	
October 2	at Arkansas		The Hill; Fayetteville, AR	T 7–7		
October 9	Tulsa*		Amon G. Carter Stadium; Ft. Worth, TX	W 20–13	7,500	
October 16	Texas A&M		Amon G. Carter Stadium; Fort Worth, TX	T 7–7	25,000	
October 23	at No. 9 Fordham*		Polo Grounds; New York, NY	L 6–7	25,000	
October 30	at No. 6 Baylor		Waco Stadium; Waco, TX (rivalry)	L 0–6	17,000	
November 6	at Centenary*		State Fair Stadium; Shreveport, LA	L 9–10	8,000	
November 13	at Texas		War Memorial Stadium; Austin, TX (rivalry)	W 14–0	17,000	
November 20	No. 15 Rice		Amon G. Carter Stadium; Fort Worth, TX	W 7–2		
November 27	SMU	No. 14	Amon G. Carter Stadium; Fort Worth, TX (rivalry)	W 3–0		
*Non-conference game; Rankings from AP Poll released prior to the game

== Team players drafted into the NFL ==
Ki Aldrich and Davey O'Brien were selected in the 1939 NFL draft.
