= 1937 Michigan State Normal Hurons football team =

American college football season

1937 Michigan State Normal Hurons football
- Conference: Independent
- Record: 5–2–1
- Head coach: Elton Rynearson (16th season)
- Captain: August R. DeFroscia
- Home stadium: Normal Field

1937 Midwestern college football independents records
	Conf.			Overall
Team	W	L	T	W		L		T
Michigan State		–		8	–	2	–	0
Akron		–		7	–	2	–	0
Central Michigan		–		6	–	2	–	0
DePaul		–		5	–	1	–	2
Wayne		–		6	–	2	–	0
No. T–9 Notre Dame		–		6	–	2	–	1
Detroit		–		7	–	3	–	0
Michigan State Normal		–		5	–	2	–	1
Western State Teachers		–		5	–	3	–	0
Michigan Tech		–		4	–	3	–	0
Xavier		–		4	–	5	–	1
Marquette		–		3	–	6	–	0
Haskell		–		2	–	7	–	0
Rankings from AP Poll

The 1937 Michigan State Normal Hurons football team represented Michigan State Normal College (later renamed Eastern Michigan University) as an independent during the 1937 college football season. In their 16th season under head coach Elton Rynearson, the Hurons compiled a record of 5–2–1 and outscored their opponents by a combined total of 156 to 69. August R. DeFroscia was the team captain. The team played its home games at Normal Field on the school's campus in Ypsilanti, Michigan.

In January 1937, Walter Briggs Sr., a native of Ypsilanti, agreed to donate an athletic plant to the school, consisting of a field house and football and baseball grandstands. The football field was called Walter O. Briggs Field in his honor. It opened in March 1938.

== Schedule ==
Date	Opponent	Site	Result
September 25	at Ball State	Muncie, IN	W 13–6
October 2	at Northern Michigan	Marquette, MI	W 44–0
October 9	Bowling Green	Normal Field; Ypsilanti, MI	W 25–0
October 15	at Alma	Alma, MI	T 12–12
October 23	Central Michigan^{†}	Normal Field; Ypsilanti, MI (rivalry)	L 10–27
October 30	at Hope	Holland, MI	W 19–0
November 6	at Wayne	Detroit, MI	L 0–7
November 13	Indiana State	Normal Field; Ypsilanti, MI	W 33–7
^{†}Homecoming
