= 1937 North Dakota Fighting Sioux football team =

American college football season

1937 North Dakota Fighting Sioux football

NCC champion
- Conference: North Central Conference
- Record: 4–4 (3–0 NCC)
- Head coach: Charles A. West (10th season)
- Home stadium: Memorial Stadium

1937 North Central Conference football standings
	Conf.					Overall
Team	W		L		T	W		L		T
North Dakota $	3	–	0	–	0	4	–	4	–	0
South Dakota	4	–	1	–	0	6	–	4	–	0
Morningside	2	–	2	–	1	4	–	2	–	2
North Dakota Agricultural	2	–	2	–	0	5	–	4	–	0
Iowa State Teachers	2	–	2	–	1	2	–	4	–	3
South Dakota State	2	–	3	–	0	4	–	5	–	0
Omaha	0	–	5	–	0	2	–	6	–	0
$ – Conference champion

The 1937 North Dakota Fighting Sioux football team, also known as the Nodaks, was an American football team that represented the University of North Dakota in the North Central Conference (NCC) during the 1937 college football season. In its tenth year under head coach Charles A. West, the team compiled a 4–4 record (3–0 against NCC opponents), won the conference championship, and outscored opponents by a total of 97 to 79.

== Schedule ==
Date	Opponent	Site	Result	Attendance	Source
September 24	St. Thomas (MN)*	Memorial Stadium; Grand Forks, ND	W 25–2		
October 1	South Dakota	Memorial Stadium; Grand Forks, ND (rivalry)	W 6–0		
October 9	at Iowa State Teachers*	Cedar Falls, IA	W 21–0		
October 15	DePaul*	Memorial Stadium; Grand Forks, ND	L 0–6		
October 23	at Winnipeg Blue Bombers*	Winnipeg, MB	L 8–10		
October 30	North Dakota Agricultural	Memorial Stadium; Grand Forks, ND (rivalry)	W 27–0		
November 13	at Detroit*	University of Detroit Stadium; Detroit, MI	L 0–40	10,000	
November 25	at Montana*	Dornblaser Field; Missoula, MT	L 3–14	6,000	
*Non-conference game
