= 1937 Missouri Tigers football team =

American college football season

1937 Missouri Tigers football
- Conference: Big Six Conference
- Record: 3–6–1 (2–2–1 Big 6)
- Head coach: Don Faurot (3rd season)
- Home stadium: Memorial Stadium

1937 Big Six Conference football standings
| | Conf. | | | | | Overall |
| Team | W | | L | | T | W | | L | | T |
|---|---|---|---|---|---|---|---|---|---|---|
| No. 11 Nebraska $ | 3 | – | 0 | – | 2 | 6 | – | 1 | – | 2 |
| Oklahoma | 3 | – | 1 | – | 1 | 5 | – | 2 | – | 2 |
| Kansas | 2 | – | 1 | – | 2 | 3 | – | 4 | – | 2 |
| Missouri | 2 | – | 2 | – | 1 | 3 | – | 6 | – | 1 |
| Iowa State | 1 | – | 4 | – | 0 | 3 | – | 6 | – | 0 |
| Kansas State | 1 | – | 4 | – | 0 | 4 | – | 5 | – | 0 |
$ – Conference champion; Rankings from AP Poll

The 1937 Missouri Tigers football team was an American football team that represented the University of Missouri in the Big Six Conference (Big 6) during the 1937 college football season. The team compiled a 3–6–1 record (2–2–1 against Big 6 opponents), finished in fourth place in the Big 6, and was outscored by all opponents by a combined total of 64 to 42. Don Faurot was the head coach for the third of 19 seasons. The team played its home games at Memorial Stadium in Columbia, Missouri.

The team's leading scorer was Henry Mahle with eight points.

== Schedule ==
| Date | Time | Opponent | Site | Result | Attendance | Source |
|---|---|---|---|---|---|---|
| October 2 | | at Colorado* | Colorado Stadium; Boulder, CO | L 6–14 | | |
| October 9 | | Kansas State | Memorial Stadium; Columbia, MO | W 14–7 | | |
| October 16 | | Michigan State* | Memorial Stadium; Columbia, MO | L 0–2 | 10,000 | |
| October 23 | | No. 8 Nebraska | Memorial Stadium; Columbia, MO (rivalry) | L 0–7 | | |
| October 30 | | at Iowa State | State Field; Ames, IA (rivalry) | W 12–0 | 9,082 | |
| November 6 | | at Saint Louis* | Walsh Stadium; St. Louis, MO | L 7–14 | 6,000 | |
| November 13 | | Oklahoma | Memorial Stadium; Columbia, MO (rivalry) | L 0–7 | | |
| November 20 | 2:00 p.m. | at Washington University* | Francis Field; St. Louis, MO | W 3–0 | 6,000 | |
| November 25 | | at Kansas | Memorial Stadium; Lawrence, KS (rivalry) | T 0–0 | 22,000–23,000 | |
| November 27 | | at UCLA* | Los Angeles Memorial Coliseum; Los Angeles, CA | L 0–13 | 20,000 | |
*Non-conference game; Rankings from Coaches' Poll released prior to the game; All times are in Central time
