= 1937 Washburn Ichabods football team =

American college football season

1937 Washburn Ichabods football
- Conference: Missouri Valley Conference
- Record: 0–10 (0–3 MVC)
- Head coach: Elmer Holm (2nd season)
- Home stadium: Moore Bowl

1937 Missouri Valley Conference football standings
	Conf.					Overall
Team	W		L		T	W		L		T
Tulsa $	3	–	0	–	0	6	–	2	–	2
Drake	4	–	1	–	0	8	–	2	–	0
Saint Louis	2	–	1	–	0	7	–	2	–	1
Oklahoma A&M	2	–	2	–	0	4	–	6	–	0
Washington University	2	–	2	–	0	4	–	6	–	0
Grinnell	1	–	3	–	0	2	–	6	–	1
Creighton	1	–	3	–	0	2	–	7	–	0
Washburn	0	–	3	–	0	0	–	10	–	0
$ – Conference champion

The 1937 Washburn Ichabods football team represented Washburn University during the 1937 college football season. Washburn played their home games at the Moore Bowl in Topeka, Kansas. In their second year under head coach Elmer Holm, the Ichabods compiled a 0–10 record and were 0–3 in the Missouri Valley Conference.

== Schedule ==
Date	Opponent	Site	Result	Source
September 24	Kansas State Teachers*	Moore Bowl; Topeka, KS (rivalry)	L 6–12	
October 1	Kansas*	Moore Bowl; Topeka, KS	L 2–25	
October 9	at Drake	Drake Stadium; Des Moines, IA	L 0–25	
October 16	Oklahoma A&M	Moore Bowl; Topeka, KS	L 3–25	
October 22	Grinnell	Moore Bowl; Topeka, KS	L 0–13	
October 29	Colorado College*	Moore Bowl; Topeka, KS	L 0–6	
November 6	at Kansas State*	Memorial Stadium; Manhattan, KS	L 7–20	
November 14	at St. Mary's (TX)*	San Antionio, TX	L 13–51	
November 20	St. Benedict's*	Moore Bowl; Topeka, KS	L 0–13	
November 25	at Wichita*	Moore Bowl; Topeka, KS	L 7–19	
*Non-conference game
