= 1937 Michigan State Spartans football team =

American college football season

1937 Michigan State Spartans football
- Conference: Independent
- Record: 8–2
- Head coach: Charlie Bachman (5th season)
- Offensive scheme: Notre Dame Box
- MVP: Harry Speelman
- Captain: Harry Speelman
- Home stadium: Macklin Field

1937 Midwestern college football independents records
	Conf.			Overall
Team	W	L	T	W		L		T
Michigan State		–		8	–	2	–	0
Akron		–		7	–	2	–	0
Central Michigan		–		6	–	2	–	0
DePaul		–		5	–	1	–	2
Wayne		–		6	–	2	–	0
No. T–9 Notre Dame		–		6	–	2	–	1
Detroit		–		7	–	3	–	0
Michigan State Normal		–		5	–	2	–	1
Western State Teachers		–		5	–	3	–	0
Michigan Tech		–		4	–	3	–	0
Xavier		–		4	–	5	–	1
Marquette		–		3	–	6	–	0
Haskell		–		2	–	7	–	0
Rankings from AP Poll

The 1937 Michigan State Spartans football team represented Michigan State College as an independent during the 1937 college football season. In their fifth season under head coach Charlie Bachman, the Spartans compiled an 8–2 record and won their annual rivalry game with Michigan by a 19 to 14 score. In inter-sectional play, the team defeated Kansas (16–0), Temple (13–6), Carnegie Tech (13–6), and San Francisco (14–0), but lost to Manhattan (3–0) and Auburn (6–0 in the 1938 Orange Bowl).

Halfback John Pingel was selected by the Associated Press (AP) as a second-team player, and by the International News Service (INS) and Central Press Association as a third-team player, on the 1937 College Football All-America Team. Pingel was later inducted into the College Football Hall of Fame.

== Schedule ==
Date	Opponent	Site	Result	Attendance	Source
September 25	Wayne	Macklin Field; East Lansing, MI	W 19–0	18,000	
October 2	at Michigan	Michigan Stadium; Ann Arbor, MI (rivalry)	W 19–14	71,200	
October 9	at Manhattan	Ebbets Field; Brooklyn, NY	L 0–3	8,000	
October 16	at Missouri	Memorial Stadium; Columbia, MO	W 2–0	10,000	
October 23	Marquette	Macklin Field; East Lansing, MI	W 21–7	15,000	
October 30	Kansas	Macklin Field; East Lansing, MI	W 16–0	10,000	
November 6	at Temple	Temple Stadium; Philadelphia, PA	W 13–6	12,000	
November 13	Carnegie Tech^{†}	Macklin Field; East Lansing, MI	W 13–6	20,000	
November 27	at San Francisco	Kezar Stadium; San Francisco, CA	W 14–0	20,000	
January 1, 1938	vs. Auburn	Burdine Stadium; Miami, FL (Orange Bowl)	L 0–6	18,000	
^{†}Homecoming
