= 1937 South Dakota State Jackrabbits football team =

American college football season

1937 South Dakota State Jackrabbits football
- Conference: North Central Conference
- Record: 4–5 (2–3 NCC)
- Head coach: Red Threlfall (4th season)
- Home stadium: State Field

1937 North Central Conference football standings
	Conf.					Overall
Team	W		L		T	W		L		T
North Dakota $	3	–	0	–	0	4	–	4	–	0
South Dakota	4	–	1	–	0	6	–	4	–	0
Morningside	2	–	2	–	1	4	–	2	–	2
North Dakota Agricultural	2	–	2	–	0	5	–	4	–	0
Iowa State Teachers	2	–	2	–	1	2	–	4	–	3
South Dakota State	2	–	3	–	0	4	–	5	–	0
Omaha	0	–	5	–	0	2	–	6	–	0
$ – Conference champion

The 1937 South Dakota State Jackrabbits football team was an American football team that represented South Dakota State University in the North Central Conference (NCC) during the 1937 college football season. In its fourth season under head coach Red Threlfall, the team compiled a 4–5 record and was outscored by a total of 147 to 102.

== Schedule ==
Date	Opponent	Site	Result	Attendance	Source
September 18	Mankato Teachers*	State Field; Brookings, SD	W 40–7		
September 25	at Wisconsin*	Camp Randall Stadium; Madison, WI	L 0–32		
October 1	Omaha	State Field; Brookings, SD	W 20–0		
October 9	at North Dakota Agricultural	Dacotah Field; Fargo, ND (rivalry)	W 13–6		
October 16	Morningside	State Field; Brookings, SD	L 0–7		
October 23	Wichita*	State Field; Brookings, SD	W 20–6		
October 30	at South Dakota	Inman Field; Vermillion, SD (Dakota Day, rivalry)	L 2–12	5,000	
November 6	at Iowa State Teachers	Cedar Falls, IA	L 0–33	4,000	
November 13	at DePaul*	Wrigley Field; Chicago, IL	L 7–44		
*Non-conference game
