= 1937 Tulsa Golden Hurricane football team =

American college football season

1937 Tulsa Golden Hurricane football

MVC champion
- Conference: Missouri Valley Conference
- Record: 6–2–2 (3–0 MVC)
- Head coach: Vic Hurt (2nd season)
- Home stadium: Skelly Field

1937 Missouri Valley Conference football standings
	Conf.					Overall
Team	W		L		T	W		L		T
Tulsa $	3	–	0	–	0	6	–	2	–	2
Drake	4	–	1	–	0	8	–	2	–	0
Saint Louis	2	–	1	–	0	7	–	2	–	1
Oklahoma A&M	2	–	2	–	0	4	–	6	–	0
Washington University	2	–	2	–	0	4	–	6	–	0
Grinnell	1	–	3	–	0	2	–	6	–	1
Creighton	1	–	3	–	0	2	–	7	–	0
Washburn	0	–	3	–	0	0	–	10	–	0
$ – Conference champion

The 1937 Tulsa Golden Hurricane football team represented the University of Tulsa during the 1937 college football season. In their second year under head coach Vic Hurt, the Golden Hurricane compiled a 6–2–2 record and won the Missouri Valley Conference championship. The team defeated Oklahoma (19–7) and Oklahoma A&M (27–0), but lost to No. 16 TCU (20–13) and No. 14 Arkansas (28–7) and tied No. 18 Rice (0–0).

== Schedule ==
Date	Time	Opponent	Rank	Site	Result	Attendance	Source
September 25		Oklahoma*		Skelly Field; Tulsa, OK	W 19–7	16,000	
October 2		Central State Teachers*		Skelly Field; Tulsa, OK	W 42–6	7,000	
October 9		at TCU*		Amon G. Carter Stadium; Fort Worth, TX	L 13–20	7,500	
October 16		at Rice*		Rice Field; Houston, TX	T 0–0	8,000–14,000	
October 23		Oklahoma A&M^{†}		Skelly Field; Tulsa, OK (rivalry)	W 27–0	17,000	
October 29		at George Washington*		Griffith Stadium; Washington, DC	W 14–13	10,000–13,000	
November 6		Drake		Skelly Field; Tulsa, OK	W 41–9	12,500	
November 13	2:00 p.m.	at Washington University		Francis Field; St. Louis, MO	W 32–7	6,500	
November 25		Arkansas*	No. 20	Skelly Field; Tulsa, OK	L 7–28	19,000	
December 4		Manhattan*		Skelly Field; Tulsa, OK	T 0–0	10,000	
*Non-conference game; ^{†}Homecoming; Rankings from AP Poll released prior to the game; All times are in Central time
