= Harry Speelman =

American football player (1916–1983)

Profile
- Position: Guard

Personal information
- Born: October 4, 1916; Detroit, Michigan, U.S.
- Died: April 1, 1983 (age 66); Pigeon, Michigan, U.S.
- Listed height: 5 ft 11 in (1.80 m)
- Listed weight: 220 lb (100 kg)

Career information
- High school: Central
- College: Michigan State University

Career history
- Detroit Lions (1940)
- Stats at Pro Football Reference

Harry E. Speelman (October 4, 1916 – April 1, 1983) was an American football player. He played college football for Michigan State University and professional football for the Detroit Lions.

== Early life ==
Speelman was born in Detroit in 1916. He attended Central High School in Lansing, Michigan.

== Michigan State ==
He played college football for Michigan State College (later known as Michigan State University) from 1935 to 1937. He was captain of the 1937 Michigan State Spartans football team that lost to Auburn in the 1938 Orange Bowl.

== Professional football ==
After graduating from Michigan State, Speelman was a coach at Redford Union High School. In August 1940, he signed with the Detroit Lions of National Football League. He appeared in three games as a guard for the Lions in 1940. He also played as a guard and tackle for the Jersey City Giants in 1951. He appeared in 10 games, seven as a starter, for the Giants.

== Later life ==
In 1943, he was hired as the football coach at St. Gregory High School in Detroit. He later worked as the director off attendance for the Detroit public school. He moved to Pigeon, Michigan, in 1977 and died there in 1983.
