= Harry Ockerman =

American sports athlete (1902–1979)

Biographical details
- Born: December 20, 1902; Gladwin, Michigan, U.S.
- Died: September 30, 1979 (aged 76); Sun City, Arizona, U.S.

Playing career

Football
- 1923–1926: Michigan State Normal

Basketball
- 1925–1927: Michigan State Normal

Baseball
- 1926–1928: Michigan State Normal
- Position: Tackle (football)

Coaching career (HC unless noted)

Football
- 1927–1934: Michigan State Normal (assistant)
- 1935–1940: Bowling Green
- 1949–1951: Michigan State Normal

Basketball
- 1932–1935: Michigan State Normal

Baseball
- 1929: Michigan State Normal
- 1932–1934: Michigan State Normal

Administrative career (AD unless noted)
- 1941–1942: Bowling Green

Head coaching record
- Overall: 27–38–9 (football); 34–16 (basketball); 18–12 (baseball)

Harry N. Ockerman (December 20, 1902 – September 30, 1979) was an American football, basketball, and baseball player and coach. He served as the head football coach at Bowling Green State University from 1935 to 1940 and at Michigan State Normal College—now known as Eastern Michigan University—from 1949 to 1951, compiling a career college football record of 27–38–9. Ockerman was also the head basketball coach at Michigan State Normal from 1932 to 1935, tallying a mark of 34–16, and the head baseball coach at the school in 1929 and from 1932 to 1934, amassing a record of 18–12.

== Head coach ==
=== Michigan State Normal football ===
In 1951, Ockerman's second, and final, year coaching the MSNC Hurons, the press reported rumors that the football players had been "doped" with novocain to allow them to play through injuries. Joseph McCulloch, in his fourth decade as MSNC's athletic director, denied the allegation, telling reporters, "We want to know who started these rumors."

== Late life and death ==
After retiring from coaching, Ockerman owned and operated a calendar and specialty advertising business in Baltimore. He died on September 30, 1979, at Boswell Hospital in Sun City, Arizona.

== Head coaching record ==
=== Football ===
| Year | Team | Overall | Conference | Standing | Bowl/playoffs |
|---|---|---|---|---|---|
Bowling Green Falcons (Ohio Athletic Conference) (1935–1940)
| 1935 | Bowling Green | 1–6 | 1–6 | T–19th | |
| 1936 | Bowling Green | 4–2–3 | 2–1–3 | T–10th | |
| 1937 | Bowling Green | 3–4–1 | 2–3–1 | 12th | |
| 1938 | Bowling Green | 3–2–3 | 2–2–2 | T–10th | |
| 1939 | Bowling Green | 6–1–1 | 3–1–1 | 7th | |
| 1940 | Bowling Green | 3–4–1 | 2–2–1 | T–9th | |
| Bowling Green: | | 20–19–9 | 12–15–8 | | |
Michigan State Normal Hurons (Independent) (1949)
| 1949 | Michigan State Normal | 0–8 | | | |
Michigan State Normal Hurons (Interstate Intercollegiate Athletic Conference) (1950–1951)
| 1950 | Michigan State Normal | 3–6 | 0–4 | 7th | |
| 1951 | Michigan State Normal | 4–5 | 2–4 | 5th | |
| Michigan State Normal: | | 7–19 | 2–8 | | |
| Total: | | 27–38–9 | | | |

=== Basketball ===
Record table
| Season | Team | Overall | Conference | Standing | Postseason |
|---|---|---|---|---|---|
Michigan State Normal Hurons (Independent) (1932–1935)
| 1932–33 | Michigan State Normal | 15–2 | | | |
| 1933–34 | Michigan State Normal | 11–7 | | | |
| 1934–35 | Michigan State Normal | 8–7 | | | |
| Michigan State Normal: | | 34–16 | | | |
| Total: | | 34–16 | | | |
