= 1937 Detroit Titans football team =

American college football season

1937 Detroit Titans football
- Conference: Independent
- Record: 7–3
- Head coach: Gus Dorais (13th season)
- Captain: Joe Cieslak
- Home stadium: University of Detroit Stadium

1937 Midwestern college football independents records
	Conf.			Overall
Team	W	L	T	W		L		T
Michigan State		–		8	–	2	–	0
Akron		–		7	–	2	–	0
Central Michigan		–		6	–	2	–	0
DePaul		–		5	–	1	–	2
Wayne		–		6	–	2	–	0
No. T–9 Notre Dame		–		6	–	2	–	1
Detroit		–		7	–	3	–	0
Michigan State Normal		–		5	–	2	–	1
Western State Teachers		–		5	–	3	–	0
Michigan Tech		–		4	–	3	–	0
Xavier		–		4	–	5	–	1
Marquette		–		3	–	6	–	0
Haskell		–		2	–	7	–	0
Rankings from AP Poll

The 1937 Detroit Titans football team represented the University of Detroit as an independent during the 1937 college football season. In their 13th year under head coach Gus Dorais, the Titans compiled a 7–3 record, shut out five opponents, was ranked No. 18 in the AP Poll after winning its first five games, and outscored all opponents by a combined total of 253 to 42. The Titans defeated Border Conference champion Texas Tech (34–0) and held the undefeated 1937 Villanova Wildcats football team to seven points.

In addition to head coach Gus Dorais, the team's coaching staff included Lloyd Brazil (backfield coach), Bud Boeringer (line coach), Eddie Barbour (freshman coach), William Pegan (assistant freshman coach), and Robert Burns (assistant freshman coach). Joe Cieslak was the team captain.

== Schedule ==
Date	Time	Opponent	Rank	Site	Result	Attendance	Source
September 24		Hillsdale		University of Detroit Stadium; Detroit, MI	W 60–0	12,850	
October 1		Western State Teachers (MI)		University of Detroit Stadium; Detroit, MI	W 20–7	14,000	
October 9		Texas Tech		University of Detroit Stadium; Detroit, MI	W 34–0	11,000	
October 15		at Catholic University		Griffith Stadium; Washington, DC	W 30–0		
October 23	2:30 p.m.	at Boston College		Alumni Field; Chestnut Hill, MA	W 14–0	7,000	
October 30		No. 16 Villanova	No. T–18	University of Detroit Stadium; Detroit, MI	L 0–7		
November 6		at Manhattan		Ebbets Field; Brooklyn, NY	L 0–7	12,000	
November 13		North Dakota		University of Detroit Stadium; Detroit, MI	W 40–0	10,000	
November 21		at Creighton		Creighton Stadium; Omaha, NE	W 48–7	6,000	
November 25		at Duquesne		Forbes Field; Pittsburgh, PA	L 7–14	10,800	
Rankings from AP Poll released prior to the game; All times are in Eastern time
