= Frank Steen =

American football player (1913–1998)

No. 36
- Position: End

Personal information
- Born: October 5, 1913; Longview, Texas, U.S.
- Died: April 2, 1998 (aged 84); Houston, Texas, U.S.
- Listed height: 6 ft 1 in (1.85 m)
- Listed weight: 190 lb (86 kg)

Career information
- High school: Forest Avenue (TX)
- College: Rice (1933–1937)
- NFL draft: 1938: undrafted

Career history
- Green Bay Packers (1939)

Awards and highlights
- NFL champion (1939)

Career NFL statistics
- Games played: 3
- Stats at Pro Football Reference

Frank William Steen (October 5, 1913 – April 2, 1998) was an American professional football end. He played college football for the Rice Owls. Although not selected in the National Football League draft, he signed with the Green Bay Packers for the 1939 season and played three games as they won the NFL championship.

== Early life ==
Frank William Steen was born on October 5, 1913, in Longview, Texas. He attended Forest Avenue High School (now known as James Madison High School) in Dallas, Texas, and is one of only five of their alumni to ever make it to the NFL, and the only one from when they were named Forest Avenue. He was an all-state choice as a senior, with the Fort Worth Star-Telegram noting that his selection was "almost unanimous." After graduating from high school, Steen began attending Rice University in 1933.

== College career ==
Steen was a three-sport athlete at Rice, playing basketball as a forward, football as an end, and baseball as a third baseman. He began seeing significant playing time in football as a sophomore in 1934, lettering while earning first-team all-conference honors from the Austin American-Statesman and helping Rice win the conference championship. The American-Statesman described him as an end "of the spectacular, slashing type who love[s] to wade full tilt into the opposing backfield. [His] reckless, colorful tactics please the crowd [and] annoy enemies no end."

However, late in 1934 Steen was placed on probation due to poor grades in the classroom and in December he was suspended until fall of 1935. He was not able to play in the 1935 season due to this. The Waco News-Tribune noted that he was "one of the most promising ends in the United States" and said that his loss was a "tough blow" for the 1935 Rice team, mentioning that "[h]e cannot be replaced without a loss of strength."

Steen was able to return to the Rice football team in 1936 and was described by his coach at the start of the season as a "clever, smashing end." He started at end for the team and The Campanile, Rice's yearbook, noted that he was one of "the outstanding ends in the conference" and that "his fiery aggressive play was one of the features of the Rice defense."

As a senior in 1937, Steen helped Rice compile an overall record of 6–3–2, win the conference championship, and earn a trip to the Cotton Bowl. In the team's rivalry game against Texas, he caught a pass to score the game-winning touchdown which was met with much controversy. Rice supporters argued that the ball had not touched the ground, while Texas supporters believed that it did; the referees ruled the play in Rice's favor, but were met with protest from Texas fans. At the end of the season, he was chosen second-team all-conference by the Fort Worth Star-Telegram. Steen graduated in 1938.

== Professional career ==
Steen was not selected in the 1938 NFL draft. He played no football that year and worked for an oil company; in the summer of 1939, he played for the Daytona Beach minor league baseball team as an outfielder. He was signed by the Green Bay Packers in January 1939, and measured at the time 6 ft 2 in and 200 pounds. He reportedly performed "sensational" in the team's preseason game against the Pittsburgh Pirates, catching several long passes. He made the final roster and appeared in three games, one as a starter, before being released at the start of October. The Packers went on to win the NFL championship that season. He did not play for any other professional team afterwards.

== Later life and death ==
Steen enlisted in the United States Armed Forces to serve in World War II the year after his stint with the Packers. He died on April 2, 1998, in Houston, Texas, at the age of 84.
