= Donald Starn =

- Starn in 1937

Biographical details
- Born: August 17, 1902; Orrville, Ohio, U.S.
- Died: August 1977 (aged 74–75); Sun City, California, U.S.

Playing career

Football
- 1922–1924: Wooster

Basketball
- c. 1924: Wooster

Baseball
- c. 1924: Wooster
- 1927: Cambridge Canners
- 1928: Jersey City Skeeters
- 1928: Bridgeport Bears
- 1929: Jersey City Skeeters
- 1929: Springfield Ponies
- Position: Pitcher (baseball)

Coaching career (HC unless noted)

Football
- 1927–1934: Ashland HS (OH)
- 1935–1942: Kent State

Basketball
- 1935–1942: Kent State

Baseball
- 1936–1938: Kent State

Administrative career (AD unless noted)
- 1935–1943: Kent State

Head coaching record
- Overall: 34–28–3 (college football); 111–96 (college basketball); 18–9 (college baseball)

George Donald "Rosy" Starn (August 17, 1902 – August 1977) was an American football, basketball, and baseball player and coach and college athletics administrator. He served as the head football coach at Kent State University from 1935 to 1942, compiling a record of 34–28–3. Starn coached at Ashland High School in Ashland, Ohio for eight years before he was hired at Kent State.

== Head coaching record ==
=== College football ===
Year	Team	Overall	Conference	Standing	Bowl/playoffs
Kent State Golden Flashes (Ohio Athletic Conference) (1935–1942)
1935	Kent State	3–5	3–5	16th	
1936	Kent State	4–4	4–3	11th	
1937	Kent State	3–4–1	3–3–1	T–7th	
1938	Kent State	6–2	3–2	10th	
1939	Kent State	3–4–1	1–3–1	T–16th	
1940	Kent State	8–1	4–0	2nd	
1941	Kent State	2–5–1	1–3	T–13th	
1942	Kent State	5–3	2–1	T–5th	
Kent State:		34–28–3	21–20–2		
Total:		34–28–3			
