= 1937 Arkansas Razorbacks football team =

American college football season

1937 Arkansas Razorbacks football
- Conference: Southwest Conference

Ranking
- AP: No. T–14
- Record: 6–2–2 (3–2–1 SWC)
- Head coach: Fred Thomsen (9th season)
- Captains: Jack Robbins; Jim Benton
- Home stadium: The Hill, Quigley Stadium

1937 Southwest Conference football standings
	Conf.					Overall
Team	W		L		T	W		L		T
No. 18 Rice $	4	–	1	–	1	6	–	3	–	2
No. 16 TCU	3	–	1	–	2	4	–	4	–	2
No. T–14 Arkansas	3	–	2	–	1	6	–	2	–	2
Baylor	3	–	3	–	0	7	–	3	–	0
Texas A&M	2	–	2	–	2	5	–	2	–	2
SMU	2	–	4	–	0	5	–	6	–	0
Texas	1	–	5	–	0	2	–	6	–	1
$ – Conference champion; Rankings from AP Poll

The 1937 Arkansas Razorbacks football team represented the University of Arkansas in the Southwest Conference (SWC) during the 1937 college football season. In their ninth year under head coach Fred Thomsen, the Razorbacks compiled a 6–2–2 record (3–2–1 against SWC opponents), finished in third place in the SWC, and outscored their opponents by a combined total of 186 to 89.

== Schedule ==
Date	Opponent	Rank	Site	Result	Attendance	Source
September 25	Central State Teachers*		The Hill; Fayetteville, AR	W 25–0		
October 2	TCU		The Hill; Fayetteville, AR	T 7–7		
October 9	at Baylor		Waco Stadium; Waco, TX	L 14–20		
October 16	at Texas		War Memorial Stadium; Austin, TX (rivalry)	W 21–10		
October 23	SMU		Grizzly Stadium; Fort Smith, AR	W 13–0	9,500	
October 30	Texas A&M^{†}	No. 20	The Hill; Fayetteville, AR (rivalry)	W 26–13	8,000	
November 6	at Rice	No. 16	Rice Field; Houston, TX	L 20–26		
November 13	vs. Ole Miss*	No. 20	Crump Stadium; Memphis, TN (rivalry)	W 32–6	15,000	
November 20	George Washington*		Quigley Stadium; Little Rock, AR	T 0–0	8,000	
November 25	at No. 20 Tulsa*		Skelly Field; Tulsa, OK	W 28–7	19,000	
*Non-conference game; ^{†}Homecoming; Rankings from AP Poll released prior to the game

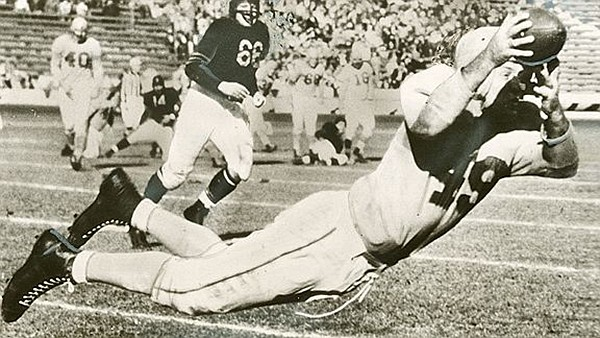
Jim Benton diving for a catch
