= 1937 Marquette Golden Avalanche football team =

American college football season

1937 Marquette Golden Avalanche football
- Conference: Independent
- Record: 3–6
- Head coach: Paddy Driscoll (1st season)
- Home stadium: Marquette Stadium

1937 Midwestern college football independents records
	Conf.			Overall
Team	W	L	T	W		L		T
Michigan State		–		8	–	2	–	0
Akron		–		7	–	2	–	0
Central Michigan		–		6	–	2	–	0
DePaul		–		5	–	1	–	2
Wayne		–		6	–	2	–	0
No. T–9 Notre Dame		–		6	–	2	–	1
Detroit		–		7	–	3	–	0
Michigan State Normal		–		5	–	2	–	1
Western State Teachers		–		5	–	3	–	0
Michigan Tech		–		4	–	3	–	0
Xavier		–		4	–	5	–	1
Marquette		–		3	–	6	–	0
Haskell		–		2	–	7	–	0
Rankings from AP Poll

The 1937 Marquette Golden Avalanche football team was an American football team that represented Marquette University as an independent during the 1937 college football season. In its first season under head coach Paddy Driscoll, the team compiled a 3–6 record and was outscored by a total of 124 to 48. The team played its home games at Marquette Stadium in Milwaukee.

In February 1937, Frank Murray resigned as Marquette's head football coach after 15 years in the position; Murray left to accept the same position at the University of Virginia. Three weeks later, Marquette hired Paddy Driscoll as its new coach. Driscoll had previously played both Major League Baseball and in the National Football League; he was later inducted into both the College and Pro Football Hall of Fames.

== Schedule ==
Date	Opponent	Site	Result	Attendance	Source
September 25	Ripon	Marquette Stadium; Milwaukee, WI	W 14–0		
October 2	at Wisconsin	Camp Randall Stadium; Madison, WI	L 0–12	30,942	
October 8	South Dakota	Marquette Stadium; Milwaukee, WI	W 7–6	8,000	
October 16	at Kansas State	Memorial Stadium; Manhattan, KS	L 0–13	3,500	
October 23	at Michigan State	Macklin Field; East Lansing, MI	L 7–21	15,000	
October 30	vs. No. 14 Santa Clara	Soldier Field; Chicago, IL	L 0–38	40,000	
November 6	at No. 13 Villanova	Shibe Park; Philadelphia, PA	L 7–25	12,000	
November 13	Iowa State	Marquette Stadium; Milwaukee, WI	L 0–3	8,000	
November 20	Duquesne	Marquette Stadium; Milwaukee, WI	W 13–6	7,000	
Rankings from AP Poll released prior to the game
