= 1937 Kent State Golden Flashes football team =

American college football season

1937 Kent State Golden Flashes football
- Conference: Ohio Athletic Conference
- Record: 3–4–1 (3–3–1 OAC)
- Head coach: Donald Starn (3rd season)
- Home stadium: Rockwell Field

1937 Ohio Athletic Conference football standings
| | Conf. | | | | | Overall |
| Team | W | | L | | T | W | | L | | T |
|---|---|---|---|---|---|---|---|---|---|---|
| Baldwin–Wallace $ | 4 | – | 0 | – | 0 | 6 | – | 2 | – | 0 |
| Denison | 5 | – | 1 | – | 1 | 6 | – | 1 | – | 1 |
| Case | 4 | – | 1 | – | 0 | 6 | – | 2 | – | 1 |
| Ohio Northern | 4 | – | 1 | – | 3 | 4 | – | 1 | – | 3 |
| Marietta | 4 | – | 1 | – | 0 | 4 | – | 4 | – | 0 |
| Wooster | 5 | – | 2 | – | 0 | 6 | – | 2 | – | 0 |
| Muskingum | 3 | – | 3 | – | 2 | 4 | – | 3 | – | 2 |
| Heidelberg | 4 | – | 4 | – | 1 | 4 | – | 4 | – | 1 |
| Kent State | 3 | – | 3 | – | 1 | 3 | – | 4 | – | 1 |
| Kenyon | 1 | – | 1 | – | 1 | 2 | – | 4 | – | 1 |
| Capital | 3 | – | 4 | – | 0 | 4 | – | 4 | – | 0 |
| Mount Union | 2 | – | 3 | – | 2 | 3 | – | 3 | – | 3 |
| Bowling Green | 2 | – | 3 | – | 1 | 3 | – | 4 | – | 1 |
| John Carroll | 1 | – | 2 | – | 0 | 3 | – | 5 | – | 0 |
| Oberlin | 1 | – | 3 | – | 1 | 2 | – | 3 | – | 3 |
| Ashland | 2 | – | 5 | – | 0 | 2 | – | 6 | – | 0 |
| Wittenberg | 2 | – | 5 | – | 0 | 2 | – | 7 | – | 0 |
| Findlay | 1 | – | 4 | – | 1 | 3 | – | 4 | – | 1 |
| Otterbein | 1 | – | 6 | – | 0 | 2 | – | 6 | – | 0 |
| Toledo | 0 | – | 0 | – | 0 | 6 | – | 3 | – | 0 |
$ – Conference champion

The 1937 Kent State Golden Flashes football team was an American football team that represented Kent State University in the Ohio Athletic Conference (OAC) during the 1937 college football season. In its third season under head coach Donald Starn, Kent State compiled a 3–4–1 record and outscored opponents by a total of 73 to 67.

== Schedule ==
| Date | Opponent | Site | Result | Source |
|---|---|---|---|---|
| September 25 | at Baldwin–Wallace | Berea, OH | L 0–13 | |
| October 2 | Heidelberg | Rockwell Field; Kent, OH | L 7–13 | |
| October 9 | Otterbein | Rockwell Field; Kent, OH | W 13–6 | |
| October 16 | at Wooster | Wooster, OH | L 6–15 | |
| October 23 | at Buffalo* | Rotary Field; Buffalo, NY | L 0–13 | |
| October 30 | Bowling Green | Rockwell Field; Kent, OH (rivalry) | T 13–13 | |
| November 6 | Findlay^{†} | Rockwell Field; Kent, OH | W 26–0 | |
| November 11 | at Ashland | Ashland, OH | W 14–0 | |
*Non-conference game; ^{†}Homecoming

== Gallery ==
Junior fullback Carmen Falcone (lead scorer)
