= 1937 Creighton Bluejays football team =

American college football season

1937 Creighton Bluejays football
- Conference: Missouri Valley Conference
- Record: 2–7 (1–3 MVC)
- Head coach: Marchmont Schwartz (3rd season)
- Home stadium: Creighton Stadium

1937 Missouri Valley Conference football standings
	Conf.					Overall
Team	W		L		T	W		L		T
Tulsa $	3	–	0	–	0	6	–	2	–	2
Drake	4	–	1	–	0	8	–	2	–	0
Saint Louis	2	–	1	–	0	7	–	2	–	1
Oklahoma A&M	2	–	2	–	0	4	–	6	–	0
Washington University	2	–	2	–	0	4	–	6	–	0
Grinnell	1	–	3	–	0	2	–	6	–	1
Creighton	1	–	3	–	0	2	–	7	–	0
Washburn	0	–	3	–	0	0	–	10	–	0
$ – Conference champion

The 1937 Creighton Bluejays football team was an American football team that represented Creighton University as a member of the Missouri Valley Conference (MVC) during the 1937 college football season. In its third season under head coach Marchmont Schwartz, the team compiled a 2–7 record (1–3 against MVC opponents) and was outscored by a total of 141 to 45. The team played its home games at Creighton Stadium in Omaha, Nebraska.

== Schedule ==
Date	Opponent	Site	Result	Attendance	Source
September 25	St. Benedict's*	Creighton Stadium; Omaha, NE	W 6–0		
October 2	at Oklahoma A&M	Lewis Field; Stillwater, OK	L 13–16		
October 8	Grinnell	Creighton Stadium; Omaha, NE	W 6–0		
October 15	Drake	Creighton Stadium; Omaha, NE	L 0–9		
October 23	Kansas State*	Creighton Stadium; Omaha, NE	L 7–15		
November 6	at Xavier*	Corcoran Stadium; Cincinnati, OH	L 0–19		
November 13	Saint Louis	Creighton Stadium; Omaha, NE	L 6–7		
November 21	Detroit*	Creighton Stadium; Omaha, NE	L 7–48	6,000	
November 25	at Texas Tech*	Tech Field; Lubbock, TX	L 0–27	7,000	
*Non-conference game
