= 1937 Texas A&M Aggies football team =

American college football season

1937 Texas A&M Aggies football
- Conference: Southwest Conference
- Record: 5–2–2 (2–2–2 SWC)
- Head coach: Homer Norton (4th season)
- Home stadium: Kyle Field

1937 Southwest Conference football standings
	Conf.					Overall
Team	W		L		T	W		L		T
No. 18 Rice $	4	–	1	–	1	6	–	3	–	2
No. 16 TCU	3	–	1	–	2	4	–	4	–	2
No. T–14 Arkansas	3	–	2	–	1	6	–	2	–	2
Baylor	3	–	3	–	0	7	–	3	–	0
Texas A&M	2	–	2	–	2	5	–	2	–	2
SMU	2	–	4	–	0	5	–	6	–	0
Texas	1	–	5	–	0	2	–	6	–	1
$ – Conference champion; Rankings from AP Poll

The 1937 Texas A&M Aggies football team represented the Agricultural and Mechanical College of Texas—now known as Texas A&M University—in the Southwest Conference (SWC) during the 1937 college football season. In its fourth season under head coach Homer Norton, the team compiled an overall record of 5–2–2, with a mark of 2–2–2 in conference play, and finished fifth in the SWC.

== Schedule ==
Date	Opponent	Rank	Site	Result	Attendance	Source
October 2	at Manhattan*		Polo Grounds; New York, NY	W 14–7	20,000	
October 9	vs. Mississippi State*		Lion Stadium; Tyler, TX	W 14–0	16,000	
October 16	at TCU		Amon G. Carter Stadium; Fort Worth, TX (rivalry)	T 7–7	25,000	
October 23	No. 15 Baylor	No. 13	Kyle Field; College Station, TX (rivalry)	L 0–13	17,000	
October 30	at No. 20 Arkansas		The Hill; Fayetteville, AR (rivalry)	L 13–26	8,000	
November 6	SMU		Kyle Field; College Station, TX	W 14–0	8,000	
November 13	at No. 15 Rice		Rice Field; Houston, TX	T 6–6	18,000	
November 25	Texas		Kyle Field; College Station, TX (rivalry)	W 7–0	32,000	
December 4	at San Francisco*		Kezar Stadium; San Francisco, CA	W 42–0	15,000	
*Non-conference game; Rankings from AP Poll released prior to the game
