= 1937 Southwestern Moundbuilders football team =

American college football season

1937 Southwestern Moundbuilders football
- Conference: Central Intercollegiate Conference
- Record: 3–5 (0–4 CIC)
- Head coach: Don Copper (1st season)
- Captains: Meredith Mayse; Ray Henry

1937 Central Intercollegiate Conference football standings
	Conf.					Overall
Team	W		L		T	W		L		T
Wichita $	4	–	0	–	0	7	–	3	–	0
Emporia State	3	–	1	–	0	5	–	2	–	2
Fort Hays State	2	–	2	–	0	6	–	2	–	1
Pittsburg State	1	–	3	–	0	2	–	7	–	0
Southwestern (KS)	0	–	4	–	0	3	–	5	–	0
$ – Conference champion

The 1937 Southwestern Moundbuilders football team represented Southwestern College as a member of the Central Intercollegiate Conference (CIC) during the 1937 college football season. Led byfirst-year head coach Don Copper, the Moundbuilers compiled an overall record of 3–5 with a mark of 0–4 in conference play, placing last out of five teams in the CIC.

== Schedule ==
Date	Time	Opponent	Site	Result	Source
		at Baker*	Baldwin City, KS	W 7–6	
		College of Emporia*	Winfield, KS	W 13–0	
October 9	7:30 p.m.	at Fort Hays State	Lewis Stadium; Hays, KS	L 0–28	
October 15		Wichita	Winfield, KS	L 0–26	
		Emporia State	Winfield, KS	L 0–34	
November 6		Haskell*	Winfield, KS	W 19–6	
November 11		at Arkansas Tech*	Russellville, AR	L 0–54	
November 19		at Pittsburg State	Brandenburg Stadium; Pittsburg, KS	L 6–26	
*Non-conference game; All times are in Central time
