= 1937 SMU Mustangs football team =

American college football season

1937 SMU Mustangs football
- Conference: Southwest Conference
- Record: 5–6 (2–4 SWC)
- Head coach: Matty Bell (3rd season)
- Captains: Ray Acker; Joe Gray; Keith Ranspot
- Home stadium: Ownby Stadium, Cotton Bowl

1937 Southwest Conference football standings
	Conf.					Overall
Team	W		L		T	W		L		T
No. 18 Rice $	4	–	1	–	1	6	–	3	–	2
No. 16 TCU	3	–	1	–	2	4	–	4	–	2
No. T–14 Arkansas	3	–	2	–	1	6	–	2	–	2
Baylor	3	–	3	–	0	7	–	3	–	0
Texas A&M	2	–	2	–	2	5	–	2	–	2
SMU	2	–	4	–	0	5	–	6	–	0
Texas	1	–	5	–	0	2	–	6	–	1
$ – Conference champion; Rankings from AP Poll

The 1937 SMU Mustangs football team was an American football team that represented Southern Methodist University (SMU) as a member of the Southwest Conference (SWC) during the 1937 college football season. In their third season under head coach Matty Bell, the Mustangs compiled a 5–6 record (2–4 against conference opponents) and outscored opponents by a total of 93 to 80. The team played its home games at Ownby Stadium in University Park, Texas, and the Cotton Bowl in Dallas.

Tackle Charles Sprague received first-team honors from the Associated Press on the 1937 All-Southwest Conference football team.

== Schedule ==
Date	Time	Opponent	Site	Result	Attendance	Source
September 25		North Texas State Teachers*	Ownby Stadium; University Park, TX (rivalry)	W 14–3		
October 2		Centenary*	Cotton Bowl; Dallas, TX	L 6–7		
October 9	2:30 p.m.	at Washington University*	Francis Field; St. Louis, MO	W 14–0	7,500	
October 16		Vanderbilt*	Cotton Bowl; Dallas, TX	L 0–6	7,000	
October 23		at Arkansas	Grizzly Stadium; Fort Smith, AR	L 0–13	9,500	
October 30		Texas	Ownby Stadium; University Park, TX	W 13–2		
November 6		at Texas A&M	Kyle Field; College Station, TX	L 0–14	8,000	
November 13		No. 13 Baylor	Ownby Stadium; University Park, TX	W 13–7		
November 20		at UCLA*	Los Angeles Memorial Coliseum; Los Angeles, CA	W 26–13	35,000	
November 27		at No. 14 TCU	Amon G. Carter Stadium; Ft. Worth, TX (rivalry)	L 0–3		
December 4		Rice	Ownby Stadium; University Park, TX (rivalry)	L 7–15		
*Non-conference game; Rankings from AP Poll released prior to the game; All times are in Central time
