= 1937 Oklahoma Sooners football team =

American college football season

1937 Oklahoma Sooners football
- Conference: Big Six Conference
- Record: 5–2–2 (3–1–1 Big 6)
- Head coach: Tom Stidham (1st season)
- Captain: Albert Corrotto
- Home stadium: Memorial Stadium

1937 Big Six Conference football standings
| | Conf. | | | | | Overall |
| Team | W | | L | | T | W | | L | | T |
|---|---|---|---|---|---|---|---|---|---|---|
| No. 11 Nebraska $ | 3 | – | 0 | – | 2 | 6 | – | 1 | – | 2 |
| Oklahoma | 3 | – | 1 | – | 1 | 5 | – | 2 | – | 2 |
| Kansas | 2 | – | 1 | – | 2 | 3 | – | 4 | – | 2 |
| Missouri | 2 | – | 2 | – | 1 | 3 | – | 6 | – | 1 |
| Iowa State | 1 | – | 4 | – | 0 | 3 | – | 6 | – | 0 |
| Kansas State | 1 | – | 4 | – | 0 | 4 | – | 5 | – | 0 |
$ – Conference champion; Rankings from AP Poll

The 1937 Oklahoma Sooners football team represented the University of Oklahoma in the 1937 college football season. In their first year under head coach Tom Stidham, the Sooners compiled a 5–2–2 record (3–1–1 against conference opponents), finished in second place in the Big Six Conference, and outscored their opponents by a combined total of 98 to 39.

End Pete Smith received All-America honors in 1937, and four Sooners received all-conference honors: Smith, back Jack Baer, center Mickey Parks, and end Waddy Young.

== Schedule ==
| Date | Time | Opponent | Site | Result | Attendance | Source |
|---|---|---|---|---|---|---|
| September 25 | | at Tulsa* | Skelly Field; Tulsa, OK | L 7–19 | 16,000 | |
| October 2 | | Rice* | Memorial Stadium; Norman, OK | W 6–0 | 8,000 | |
| October 9 | | vs. Texas* | Cotton Bowl; Dallas, TX (rivalry) | T 7–7 | 25,000 | |
| October 16 | | at Nebraska | Memorial Stadium; Lincoln, NE (rivalry) | T 0–0 | | |
| October 23 | | Kansas | Owen Field; Norman, OK | L 3–6 | 5,000 | |
| October 30 | | at Kansas State | Memorial Stadium; Manhattan, KS | W 19–0 | | |
| November 6 | | Iowa State | Memorial Stadium; Norman, OK | W 33–7 | 8,194 | |
| November 13 | | at Missouri | Memorial Stadium; Columbia, MO (rivalry) | W 7–0 | | |
| November 20 | 2:00 p.m. | Oklahoma A&M*^{†} | Memorial Stadium; Norman, OK (Bedlam) | W 16–0 | 15,000–16,000 | |
*Non-conference game; ^{†}Homecoming; All times are in Central time

== Media ==
This was the first season that all Sooner football games were radio broadcast over the air. The games were carried by WKY and Walter Cronkite was the announcer.

== NFL draft ==
The following Oklahoma players were selected in the 1938 NFL draft following the season.

| Round | Pick | Player | Position | NFL 5eam |
|---|---|---|---|---|
| 3 | 21 | Pete Smith | End | Detroit Lions |
| 9 | 79 | Ed Parks | Center | Washington Redskins |
