= 1937 Washington University Bears football team =

American college football season

1937 Washington University Bears football
- Conference: Missouri Valley Conference
- Record: 4–6 (2–2 MVC)
- Head coach: Jimmy Conzelman (6th season)
- Home stadium: Francis Field

1937 Missouri Valley Conference football standings
	Conf.					Overall
Team	W		L		T	W		L		T
Tulsa $	3	–	0	–	0	6	–	2	–	2
Drake	4	–	1	–	0	8	–	2	–	0
Saint Louis	2	–	1	–	0	7	–	2	–	1
Oklahoma A&M	2	–	2	–	0	4	–	6	–	0
Washington University	2	–	2	–	0	4	–	6	–	0
Grinnell	1	–	3	–	0	2	–	6	–	1
Creighton	1	–	3	–	0	2	–	7	–	0
Washburn	0	–	3	–	0	0	–	10	–	0
$ – Conference champion

The 1937 Washington University Bears football team represented Washington University in St. Louis as a member of the Missouri Valley Conference (MVC) during the 1937 college football season. Led by sixth-year head coach Jimmy Conzelman, the Bears compiled an overall record of 4–6 with a mark of 2–2 in conference play, tying for fourth place in the MVC. Washington University played home games at Francis Field in St. Louis.

== Schedule ==
Date	Time	Opponent	Site	Result	Attendance	Source
September 24	8:15 p.m.	at Drake	Drake Stadium; Des Moines, IA	L 2–32	4,000–6,000	
October 2	2:30 p.m.	William Jewell*	Francis Field; St. Louis, MO	W 45–0	3,000	
October 9	2:30 p.m.	SMU*	Francis Field; St. Louis, MO	L 0–14	7,500	
October 16		Bradley*	Francis Field; St. Louis, MO	W 13–7	5,000–5,500	
October 23		at Army*	Michie Stadium; West Point, NY	L 7–47	5,000	
October 30		Boston University*	Francis Field; St. Louis, MO	L 12–14	5,500	
November 5	8:15 p.m.	Oklahoma A&M	Francis Field; St. Louis, MO	W 12–0	5,000	
November 13	2:00 p.m.	Tulsa	Francis Field; St. Louis, MO	L 7–32	6,500	
November 20	2:00 p.m.	Missouri*^{†}	Francis Field; St. Louis, MO	L 0–3	6,000	
November 25	2:00 p.m.	Saint Louis	Francis Field; St. Louis, MO	W 6–0	16,247	
*Non-conference game; ^{†}Homecoming; All times are in Central time
