= 1937 Nebraska Cornhuskers football team =

American college football season

1937 Nebraska Cornhuskers football

Big 6 champion
- Conference: Big Six Conference

Ranking
- AP: No. 11
- Record: 6–1–2 (3–0–2 Big 6)
- Head coach: Biff Jones (1st season)
- Offensive scheme: Single-wing
- Home stadium: Memorial Stadium

1937 Big Six Conference football standings
| | Conf. | | | | | Overall |
| Team | W | | L | | T | W | | L | | T |
|---|---|---|---|---|---|---|---|---|---|---|
| No. 11 Nebraska $ | 3 | – | 0 | – | 2 | 6 | – | 1 | – | 2 |
| Oklahoma | 3 | – | 1 | – | 1 | 5 | – | 2 | – | 2 |
| Kansas | 2 | – | 1 | – | 2 | 3 | – | 4 | – | 2 |
| Missouri | 2 | – | 2 | – | 1 | 3 | – | 6 | – | 1 |
| Iowa State | 1 | – | 4 | – | 0 | 3 | – | 6 | – | 0 |
| Kansas State | 1 | – | 4 | – | 0 | 4 | – | 5 | – | 0 |
$ – Conference champion; Rankings from AP Poll

The 1937 Nebraska Cornhuskers football team was an American football team that represented the University of Nebraska in the Big Six Conference during the 1937 college football season. In its first season under head coach Biff Jones, the team compiled a 6–1–2 record (3–0–2 against conference opponents), won the Big Six championship, and outscored opponents by a total of 99 to 42. The team played its home games at Memorial Stadium in Lincoln, Nebraska.

== Before the season ==
After the record eight-year tenure held by previous head coach Dana X. Bible, new head coach Jones stepped in to take over and attempt to continue the dominating success Nebraska had enjoyed over the past decade. Jones had a long resume, having coached his alma mater Army, Louisiana State and most recently Big 6 foe Oklahoma, totaling nine seasons, before arriving in Lincoln. Chosen with input from Bible, Jones inherited a strong and experienced team that had no reason to doubt that they would continue to be the team to beat in the Big 6.

== Schedule ==
| Date | Time | Opponent | Rank | Site | Result | Attendance | Source |
|---|---|---|---|---|---|---|---|
| October 2 | 2:00 p.m. | Minnesota* | | Memorial Stadium; Lincoln, NE (rivalry) | W 14–9 | 36,000 | |
| October 9 | 2:00 p.m. | at Iowa State | | State Field; Ames, IA (rivalry) | W 20–7 | 7,756 | |
| October 16 | 2:00 p.m. | Oklahoma | | Memorial Stadium; Lincoln, NE (rivalry) | T 0–0 | | |
| October 23 | 2:00 p.m. | at Missouri | No. 8 | Memorial Stadium; Columbia, MO (rivalry) | W 7–0 | | |
| October 30 | 2:00 p.m. | Indiana* | No. 11 | Memorial Stadium; Lincoln, NE | W 7–0 | | |
| November 6 | 2:00 p.m. | Kansas^{†} | No. 6 | Memorial Stadium; Lincoln, NE (rivalry) | T 13–13 | 35,000 | |
| November 13 | 1:00 p.m. | at No. 1 Pittsburgh* | No. 11 | Pitt Stadium; Pittsburgh PA | L 7–13 | 71,267 | |
| November 20 | 2:00 p.m. | Iowa* | No. 11 | Memorial Stadium; Lincoln, NE (rivalry) | W 28–0 | | |
| November 27 | 2:00 p.m. | at Kansas State | No. 11 | Memorial Stadium; Manhattan, KS (rivalry) | W 3–0 | | |
*Non-conference game; ^{†}Homecoming; Rankings from AP Poll released prior to the game; All times are in Central time

== Roster ==
| Alfson, Warren #22 G Amen, Paul #33 E Andreson, William #32 QB; Andrews, Harris #21 HB; Ashburn, Jack #55 E Ball, Arthur #20 HB; Brock, Charles #47 C Burruss, Robert #49 C Callihan, William #34 FB; Cather, Bud #10 HB; Dobson, Adna #53 G Dodd, Edward #24 HB; Dohrmann, Elmer #36 E Doyle, Theodore #43 T English, Lowell #30 G Franks, Perry #27 G Griffin, Fred #23 E Grimm, Lloyd #44 E Herrmann, William #29 G Hitchcock, Richard #2 E Hoffman, Hugo #19 HB; Howell, John #13 QB | Kahler, Robert #35 E Kingery, Orville #48 T Klum, Arlo #51 G Mathers, James #12 HB; McIllravy, Eldon #25 FB; Mehring, Robert #11 G Mills, Robert #46 T Morris, Robert #39 HB; Neprud, Vernon #52 T Peters, Gus #42 G Petsch, Roy #37 QB; Pfeiff, William #50 G Phelps, Thurston #17 QB; Płock, Marvin #15 HB; Porter, George #18 HB; Ramey, Robert #16 C Richardson, John #31 E Schwartzkopf, Sam #54 T Shindo, Kenneth #28 E Shirey, Fred #45 T Strasheim, Herman #56 T Thompson, Theos #26 E |

== Coaching staff ==
| Name | Title | First year in this position | Years at Nebraska | Alma mater |
|---|---|---|---|---|
| Biff Jones | Head Coach | 1937 | 1937–1941 | Army |
| Henry Schulte | Lineman Coach | 1931 | 1919–1924, 1931–1937 | Michigan |
| Ed Weir | Freshmen Coach | 1929 | 1926, 1929–1937, 1943 | Nebraska |
| W. Harold Browne | Assistant Coach | 1930 | 1930–1940 | |
| Roy Lyman | | 1936 | 1936–1941 | |
| Adolph J. Lewandowski | | 1937 | 1937–1944 | Nebraska |
| Jerry Adams | | | 1937 | |
| Charles Armstrong | | 1937 | 1937–1942, 1944 | |

== Game summaries ==
=== Minnesota ===
Minnesota at Nebraska

| Team | 1 | 2 | Total |
|---|---|---|---|
| Minnesota | | | 9 |
| • Nebraska | | | 14 |

- Date: October 2
- Location: Memorial Stadium • Lincoln, Nebraska
- Game attendance: 36,000

Coach Jones entered the Nebraska record books in his first game with a statement victory over longtime rival Minnesota in Lincoln, keeping intact his record of never having lost a season-opening game. The Golden Gophers scored first in a bid to continue their string of victories over the Cornhuskers, but a chink in the armor appeared when they missed the point after. From then on out both teams exchanged the lead, thanks in part to a pair of crucial Minnesota fumbles recovered by Nebraska and converted to points on the board. Nebraska's winless streak against Minnesota was snapped at five games, but the Cornhuskers were still far behind in the series, at 3–14–2. Minnesota went on to finish their season 6–2–0 and ranked #5 by the AP.

=== Iowa State ===
Nebraska at Iowa State

| Team | 1 | 2 | Total |
|---|---|---|---|
| • Nebraska | | | 20 |
| Iowa State | | | 7 |

- Date: October 9
- Location: Clyde Williams Field • Ames, Iowa
- Game attendance: 7,756

The Cyclones presented Nebraska with some looks that took a while to figure out, managing to hold off the Cornhusker machine and go up 7–0 by the halftime break. Upon the return to the field, Nebraska applied the adjustments learned from the first half to run off 20 unanswered points for the win to extend their record series winning streak to 15 games, improving over Iowa State to 27–4–1.

=== Oklahoma ===
Oklahoma at Nebraska

| Team | 1 | 2 | 3 | 4 | Total |
|---|---|---|---|---|---|
| Oklahoma | 0 | 0 | 0 | 0 | 0 |
| Nebraska | 0 | 0 | 0 | 0 | 0 |

- Date: October 16
- Location: Memorial Stadium • Lincoln, Nebraska
- Game weather: Rain

The sloppy, rainy conditions made the passing game unmanageable for either team, and ground attacks proved equally ineffective. The day was spent passing possession back and forth by turnovers and punts until time expired with no points on the board. Oklahoma's winless streak against Nebraska was extended to seven games, and they stood at 2–12–3 against the Huskers all time. The Cornhuskers subsequently appeared in the AP Poll at #8.

=== Missouri ===
#8 Nebraska at Missouri

| Team | 1 | 2 | Total |
|---|---|---|---|
| • #8 Nebraska | | | 7 |
| Missouri | | | 0 |

- Date: October 23
- Location: Faurot Field • Columbia, Missouri

Missouri had not won against Nebraska for nearly a decade, failing to take home the Missouri-Nebraska Bell even once since the prize was established. The Tigers made a determined effort to end the futility, managing to hold back the Cornhuskers from the usual running up of points, but Nebraska's first half touchdown was all that was needed to carry the day. Missouri had now failed to take a game from the Cornhuskers in ten straight contests, and fell to 6–22–3 against Nebraska all time. Despite the win, Nebraska fell to #11.

=== Indiana ===
Indiana at #11 Nebraska

| Team | 1 | 2 | 3 | 4 | Total |
|---|---|---|---|---|---|
| Indiana | 0 | 0 | 0 | 0 | 0 |
| • #11 Nebraska | 7 | 0 | 0 | 0 | 7 |

- Date: October 30
- Location: Memorial Stadium • Lincoln, Nebraska

Indiana was stunned on the first play of the game as Nebraska went 65 yards on the ground to score at the opening of the contest. Those seven points ended up being the sum of the day's scoring between the teams in an evenly matched battle of the defenses. Nebraska remained perfect against the Hoosiers in both meetings of the squads. The victory moved Nebraska up to #6 in the AP Poll.

=== Kansas ===
Kansas at #6 Nebraska

| Team | 1 | 2 | Total |
|---|---|---|---|
| Kansas | | | 13 |
| #6 Nebraska | | | 13 |

- Date: November 6
- Location: Memorial Stadium • Lincoln, Nebraska

Kansas looked like it had finally been blessed by the football gods and was going to take down Nebraska after thirteen years of frustration. The Jayhawks scored early on, were matched by the Cornhuskers, and then scored again. It looked like the one touchdown lead might hold, but as the minutes ticked to the final gun, Nebraska put together an 80-yard march down the field to tie the game again and deny either team the win. Kansas had the moral victory, but still was without a win over Nebraska in fourteen straight tries, and was far back in their shared series at 9–32–3. Due to the tie, the Cornhuskers stumbled to #11 in the AP Poll.

=== Pittsburgh ===
#11 Nebraska at #1 Pittsburgh

| Team | 1 | 2 | Total |
|---|---|---|---|
| #11 Nebraska | | | 7 |
| • #1 Pittsburgh | | | 13 |

- Date: November 13
- Location: Pitt Stadium • Pittsburgh

Nebraska traveled to Pittsburgh to face the nemesis Panthers in the now well-established grudge match. Both teams prevented the other from scoring throughout the first half, yet not long after the teams returned, Nebraska scored and for a while it looked like victory was within reach. Pittsburgh returned the favor but missed the point after, leaving the Cornhuskers with a tenuous 1-point edge. Mistakes cannot be made in games like this by teams who want to win, however, and a crucial lost Cornhusker fumble was soon converted by Pittsburgh into seven points for the takeaway win. Pittsburgh's win streak over Nebraska was pushed to five, while the Huskers remained winless in the last eleven attempts and stood at 1–8–3 against the Panthers to date. Despite the loss, Nebraska held their #11 spot, and Pittsburgh went on to finish their season 9–0–1 and ranked #1 by the AP.

=== Iowa ===
Iowa at #11 Nebraska

| Team | 1 | 2 | Total |
|---|---|---|---|
| Iowa | | | 0 |
| • #11 Nebraska | | | 28 |

- Date: November 20
- Location: Memorial Stadium • Lincoln, Nebraska

After a two-year intermission, Iowa and Nebraska met again in a contest where the Hawkeyes bore the brunt of Nebraska's frustration from the previous week's loss to Pittsburgh. Iowa's first punt was blocked and then shortly after converted into a touchdown, and from there on out the day belonged to Nebraska. Iowa dropped its fifth straight to the Cornhuskers and was now 7–17–3 against Nebraska all time. The win over a weaker team did not move the Cornhuskers up from their #11 ranking.

=== Kansas State ===
#11 Nebraska at Kansas State

| Team | 1 | 2 | Total |
|---|---|---|---|
| • #11 Nebraska | | | 3 |
| Kansas State | | | 0 |

- Date: November 27
- Location: Memorial Stadium • Manhattan, Kansas
- Game weather: Rain

Kansas State was intent on revenge after the painful 40–0 drubbing handed them to close last year's slate by Nebraska, and indeed their efforts to hold Nebraska back succeeded for almost the entire game, though they could not produce points of their own. Finally in the second half, the Cornhuskers eked out a field goal, the three points being all that was necessary to deny the Wildcats a win, secure another Big 6 title for Nebraska, and move the Cornhuskers to 18–2–2 in their series against the Kansas State. The narrow margin win was not enough to move Nebraska up from their #11 spot in the final poll.

== After the season ==
Coach Jones finished his first year at Nebraska by bringing yet another Big 6 title to Lincoln, Nebraska's eighth league championship over the last ten years, and a postseason ranking of #11 in the AP Poll. While the Cornhusker offense was not as prolific as in years past, the defense was outstanding, allowing all opponents only 42 points on the season and shutting out five teams outright. In his first year, coach Jones helped Nebraska improve to 276–90–29 (.735) all time and 90–11–11 (.853) in conference history to date.

=== Awards ===
| Award | Name(s) |
|---|---|
| All American | Charles Brock, Fred Shirey |
