= 1937 Wichita Shockers football team =

American college football season

1937 Wichita Shockers football

CIC champion
- Conference: Central Intercollegiate Conference
- Record: 7–3 (4–0 CIC)
- Head coach: Al Gebert (8th season)

1937 Central Intercollegiate Conference football standings
	Conf.					Overall
Team	W		L		T	W		L		T
Wichita $	4	–	0	–	0	7	–	3	–	0
Emporia State	3	–	1	–	0	5	–	2	–	2
Fort Hays State	2	–	2	–	0	6	–	2	–	1
Pittsburg State	1	–	3	–	0	2	–	7	–	0
Southwestern (KS)	0	–	4	–	0	3	–	5	–	0
$ – Conference champion

The 1937 Wichita Shockers football team was an American football team that represented Wichita University (now known as Wichita State University) as a member of the Central Intercollegiate Conference (CIC) during the 1937 college football season. In its eighth season under head coach Al Gebert, the team compiled a 7–3 record.

== Schedule ==
Date	Opponent	Site	Result	Attendance	Source
September 25	Oklahoma A&M*	Wichita, KS	L 8–14		
October 1	Northwestern Oklahoma State*	Wichita, KS	W 55–0		
October 9	Kansas*	Wichita, KS	W 18–7	7,500	
October 15	at Southwestern (KS)	Winfield, KS	W 26–0		
October 23	at South Dakota State*	Brookings, SD	L 6–20		
October 30	Pittsburg State	Wichita, KS	W 33–0		
November 6	at DePaul*	Chicago, IL	L 7–31		
November 11	at Emporia State	Emporia, KS	W 13–0		
November 19	Fort Hays	Wichita, KS	W 13–0		
November 25	Washburn*	Wichita, KS	W 19–7		
*Non-conference game
