= 1937 DePaul Blue Demons football team =

American college football season

1937 DePaul Blue Demons football
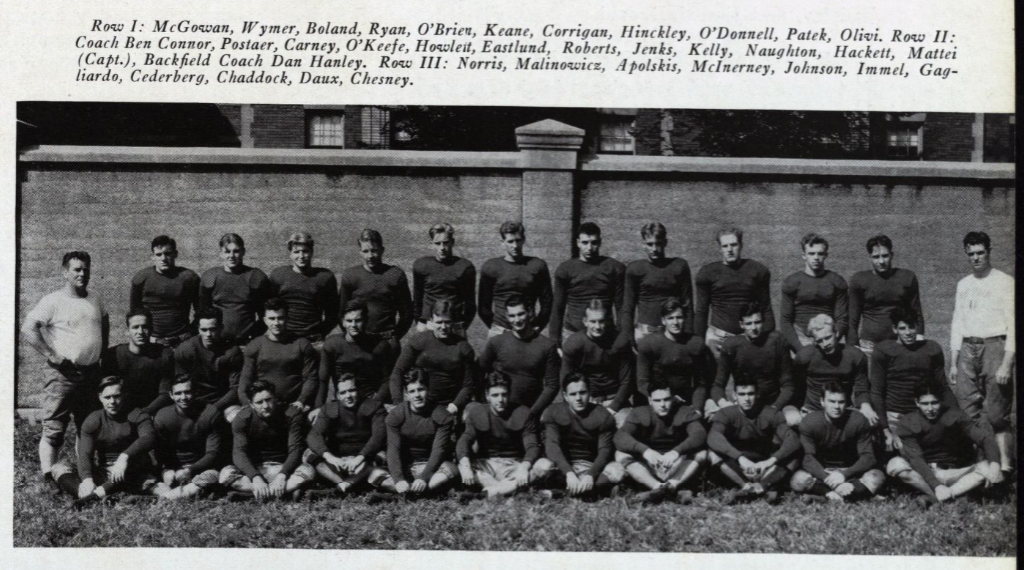
- Conference: Independent
- Record: 7–2
- Head coach: Ben Connor (3rd season)
- Home stadium: Wrigley Field, Mills Stadium

1937 Midwestern college football independents records
	Conf.			Overall
Team	W	L	T	W		L		T
Michigan State		–		8	–	2	–	0
Akron		–		7	–	2	–	0
Central Michigan		–		6	–	2	–	0
DePaul		–		5	–	1	–	2
Wayne		–		6	–	2	–	0
No. T–9 Notre Dame		–		6	–	2	–	1
Detroit		–		7	–	3	–	0
Michigan State Normal		–		5	–	2	–	1
Western State Teachers		–		5	–	3	–	0
Michigan Tech		–		4	–	3	–	0
Xavier		–		4	–	5	–	1
Marquette		–		3	–	6	–	0
Haskell		–		2	–	7	–	0
Rankings from AP Poll

The 1937 DePaul Blue Demons football team was an American football team that represented DePaul University as an independent during the 1937 college football season. The team compiled a 5–1–2 record and outscored all opponents by a total of 124 to 35. The team played its home games at Wrigley Field and Mills Stadium in Chicago. Ben Connor was the head coach.

== Schedule ==
Date	Opponent	Site	Result	Attendance	Source
October 2	at Illinois	Memorial Stadium; Champaign, IL	T 0–0		
October 9	Illinois Wesleyan	Mills Stadium; Chicago, IL	L 6–7		
October 15	at North Dakota	Memorial Stadium; Grand Forks, ND	W 6–0		
October 24	at Loyola (LA)	Loyola University Stadium; New Orleans, LA	W 18–7	18,000–20,000	
October 29	at Saint Louis	Walsh Stadium; St. Louis, MO	T 7–7	9,743	
November 6	Wichita	Wrigley Field; Chicago, IL	W 31–7		
November 13	South Dakota State	Wrigley Field; Chicago, IL	W 44–7		
November 20	at Western State Teachers (MI)	Western State Teachers College Field; Kalamazoo, MI	W 12–0		
