= 1937 Texas Longhorns football team =

American college football season

1937 Texas Longhorns football
- Conference: Southwest Conference
- Record: 2–6–1 (1–5 SWC)
- Head coach: Dana X. Bible (1st season)
- Captain: Game captains
- Home stadium: War Memorial Stadium

1937 Southwest Conference football standings
	Conf.					Overall
Team	W		L		T	W		L		T
No. 18 Rice $	4	–	1	–	1	6	–	3	–	2
No. 16 TCU	3	–	1	–	2	4	–	4	–	2
No. T–14 Arkansas	3	–	2	–	1	6	–	2	–	2
Baylor	3	–	3	–	0	7	–	3	–	0
Texas A&M	2	–	2	–	2	5	–	2	–	2
SMU	2	–	4	–	0	5	–	6	–	0
Texas	1	–	5	–	0	2	–	6	–	1
$ – Conference champion; Rankings from AP Poll

The 1937 Texas Longhorns football team was an American football team that represented the University of Texas (now known as the University of Texas at Austin) as a member of the Southwest Conference (SWC) during the 1937 college football season. In their first year under head coach Dana X. Bible, the Longhorns compiled an overall record of 2–6–1, with a mark of 1–5 in conference play, and finished seventh in the SWC.

== Schedule ==
Date	Opponent	Site	Result	Attendance	Source
September 25	Texas Tech*	War Memorial Stadium; Austin, TX (rivalry)	W 25–12	10,000	
October 2	at LSU*	Tiger Stadium; Baton Rouge, LA	L 0–9	10,000	
October 9	vs. Oklahoma*	Cotton Bowl; Dallas, TX (rivalry)	T 7–7	25,000	
October 16	Arkansas	War Memorial Stadium; Austin, TX (rivalry)	L 10–21		
October 23	Rice	War Memorial Stadium; Austin, TX (rivalry)	L 7–14	27,000	
October 30	at SMU	Ownby Stadium; University Park, TX	L 2–13		
November 6	No. 4 Baylor	War Memorial Stadium; Austin, TX (rivalry)	W 9–6		
November 13	TCU	War Memorial Stadium; Austin, TX (rivalry)	L 0–14	17,000	
November 25	at Texas A&M	Kyle Field; College Station, TX (rivalry)	L 0–7	32,000	
*Non-conference game; Rankings from AP Poll released prior to the game
