= 1937 Drake Bulldogs football team =

American college football season

1937 Drake Bulldogs football
- Conference: Missouri Valley Conference
- Record: 8–2 (4–1 MVC)
- Head coach: Vee Green (5th season)
- Home stadium: Drake Stadium

1937 Missouri Valley Conference football standings
	Conf.					Overall
Team	W		L		T	W		L		T
Tulsa $	3	–	0	–	0	6	–	2	–	2
Drake	4	–	1	–	0	8	–	2	–	0
Saint Louis	2	–	1	–	0	7	–	2	–	1
Oklahoma A&M	2	–	2	–	0	4	–	6	–	0
Washington University	2	–	2	–	0	4	–	6	–	0
Grinnell	1	–	3	–	0	2	–	6	–	1
Creighton	1	–	3	–	0	2	–	7	–	0
Washburn	0	–	3	–	0	0	–	10	–	0
$ – Conference champion

The 1937 Drake Bulldogs football team represented Drake University in the Missouri Valley Conference (MVC) during the 1937 college football season. In its fifth season under head coach Vee Green, the team compiled an 8–2 record (3–1 against MVC opponents), finished second in the MVC, and outscored all opponents by a total of 235 to 73.

== Schedule ==
Date	Time	Opponent	Site	Result	Attendance	Source
September 18		Central (IA)*	Drake Stadium; Des Moines, IA	W 47–0		
September 24	8:15 p.m.	Washington University	Drake Stadium; Des Moines, IA	W 32–2	4,000–6,000	
October 2		at Notre Dame*	Notre Dame Stadium; Notre Dame, IN	L 0–21	41,000	
October 9		Washburn	Drake Stadium; Des Moines, IA	W 25–0		
October 15		at Creighton	Creighton Stadium; Omaha, NE	W 9–0		
October 23		Iowa State*	Drake Stadium; Des Moines, IA	W 30–0	12,000	
October 29		Grinnell	Drake Stadium; Des Moines, IA	W 45–7		
November 6		at Tulsa	Skelly Field; Tulsa, OK	L 9–41	12,500	
November 13		Coe*	Drake Stadium; Des Moines, IA	W 31–2		
November 26		at Miami (FL)*	Burdine Stadium; Miami, FL	W 7–0	9,000	
*Non-conference game; All times are in Central time
