= 1937 Bowling Green Falcons football team =

American college football season

1937 Bowling Green Falcons football
- Conference: Ohio Athletic Conference
- Record: 3–4–1 (2–3–1 OAC)
- Head coach: Harry Ockerman (3rd season)
- Captain: Johnny Cheetwood
- Home stadium: Bowling Green University Stadium

1937 Ohio Athletic Conference football standings
	Conf.					Overall
Team	W		L		T	W		L		T
Baldwin–Wallace $	4	–	0	–	0	6	–	2	–	0
Denison	5	–	1	–	1	6	–	1	–	1
Case	4	–	1	–	0	6	–	2	–	1
Ohio Northern	4	–	1	–	3	4	–	1	–	3
Marietta	4	–	1	–	0	4	–	4	–	0
Wooster	5	–	2	–	0	6	–	2	–	0
Muskingum	3	–	3	–	2	4	–	3	–	2
Heidelberg	4	–	4	–	1	4	–	4	–	1
Kent State	3	–	3	–	1	3	–	4	–	1
Kenyon	1	–	1	–	1	2	–	4	–	1
Capital	3	–	4	–	0	4	–	4	–	0
Mount Union	2	–	3	–	2	3	–	3	–	3
Bowling Green	2	–	3	–	1	3	–	4	–	1
John Carroll	1	–	2	–	0	3	–	5	–	0
Oberlin	1	–	3	–	1	2	–	3	–	3
Ashland	2	–	5	–	0	2	–	6	–	0
Wittenberg	2	–	5	–	0	2	–	7	–	0
Findlay	1	–	4	–	1	3	–	4	–	1
Otterbein	1	–	6	–	0	2	–	6	–	0
Toledo	0	–	0	–	0	6	–	3	–	0
$ – Conference champion

The 1937 Bowling Green Falcons football team was an American football team that represented Bowling Green State College (later renamed Bowling Green State University) in the Ohio Athletic Conference (OAC) during the 1937 college football season. In their third season under head coach Harry Ockerman, the Falcons compiled a 3–4–1 record (2–3–1 against OAC opponents), finished in 12th place out of 19 teams in the OAC, and outscored opponents by a total of 80 to 56. John Cheetwood was the team captain.

The newly-constructed Bowling Green University Stadium was dedicated on October 16, 1937. The concrete structure had seating for 3,148 spectators and a pressbox for 35 reporters. It was built as a Works Progress Administration project at a cost of $50,000.

== Schedule ==
Date	Opponent	Site	Result	Attendance	Source
September 25	Hiram*	Bowling Green, OH	W 12–0		
October 2	at Baldwin–Wallace	Berea, OH	L 0–21		
October 9	at Michigan State Normal*	Briggs Field; Ypsilanti, MI	L 0–25		
October 16	Capital	Bowling Green University Stadium; Bowling Green, OH	W 12–0		
October 23	Ohio Northern	Bowling Green University Stadium; Bowling Green, OH	L 7–9		
October 30	at Kent State	Kent, OH (rivalry)	T 13–13		
November 6	Wittenberg	Bowling Green University Stadium; Bowling Green, OH	L 0–12	3,100	
November 11	at Heidelberg	Tiffin, OH	W 12–0		
*Non-conference game
