= 1937 Saint Louis Billikens football team =

American college football season

1937 Saint Louis Billikens football
- Conference: Missouri Valley Conference
- Record: 7–2–1 (2–1 MVC)
- Head coach: Cecil Muellerleile (4th season)
- Home stadium: Walsh Stadium

1937 Missouri Valley Conference football standings
	Conf.					Overall
Team	W		L		T	W		L		T
Tulsa $	3	–	0	–	0	6	–	2	–	2
Drake	4	–	1	–	0	8	–	2	–	0
Saint Louis	2	–	1	–	0	7	–	2	–	1
Oklahoma A&M	2	–	2	–	0	4	–	6	–	0
Washington University	2	–	2	–	0	4	–	6	–	0
Grinnell	1	–	3	–	0	2	–	6	–	1
Creighton	1	–	3	–	0	2	–	7	–	0
Washburn	0	–	3	–	0	0	–	10	–	0
$ – Conference champion

The 1937 Saint Louis Billikens football team was an American football team that represented Saint Louis University as a member of the Missouri Valley Conference (MVC) during the 1937 college football season. In its fourth season under head coach Cecil Muellerleile, the team compiled a 7–2–1 record (2–1 against MVC opponents) and outscored opponents by a total of 140 to 62. The team played its home games at Walsh Stadium in St. Louis.

== Schedule ==
Date	Time	Opponent	Site	Result	Attendance	Source
September 24		James Millikin*	Walsh Stadium; St. Louis, MO	W 37–0	< 2,000	
October 1		Missouri Mines*	Walsh Stadium; St. Louis, MO	W 32–6	8,245	
October 9		at Ole Miss*	Alumni Field; Oxford, MS	L 0–21	4,500	
October 15		at South Dakota*	Walsh Stadium; St. Louis, MO	W 9–0	6,742	
October 23		Catholic University*	Walsh Stadium; St. Louis, MO	W 7–2	4,494	
October 29		at DePaul*	Walsh Stadium; St. Louis, MO	T 7–7	9,743	
November 6		Missouri*	Walsh Stadium; St. Louis, MO	W 14–7	11,423	
November 13		at Creighton	Creighton Stadium; Omaha, NE	W 7–6	5,000	
November 20		at Grinnell	Grinnell, IA	W 27–7		
November 25	2:00 p.m.	at Washington University	Francis Field; St. Louis, MO	L 0–6	16,247	
*Non-conference game; All times are in Central time
