= 1938 Cotton Bowl Classic =

- 2nd Cotton Bowl Classic
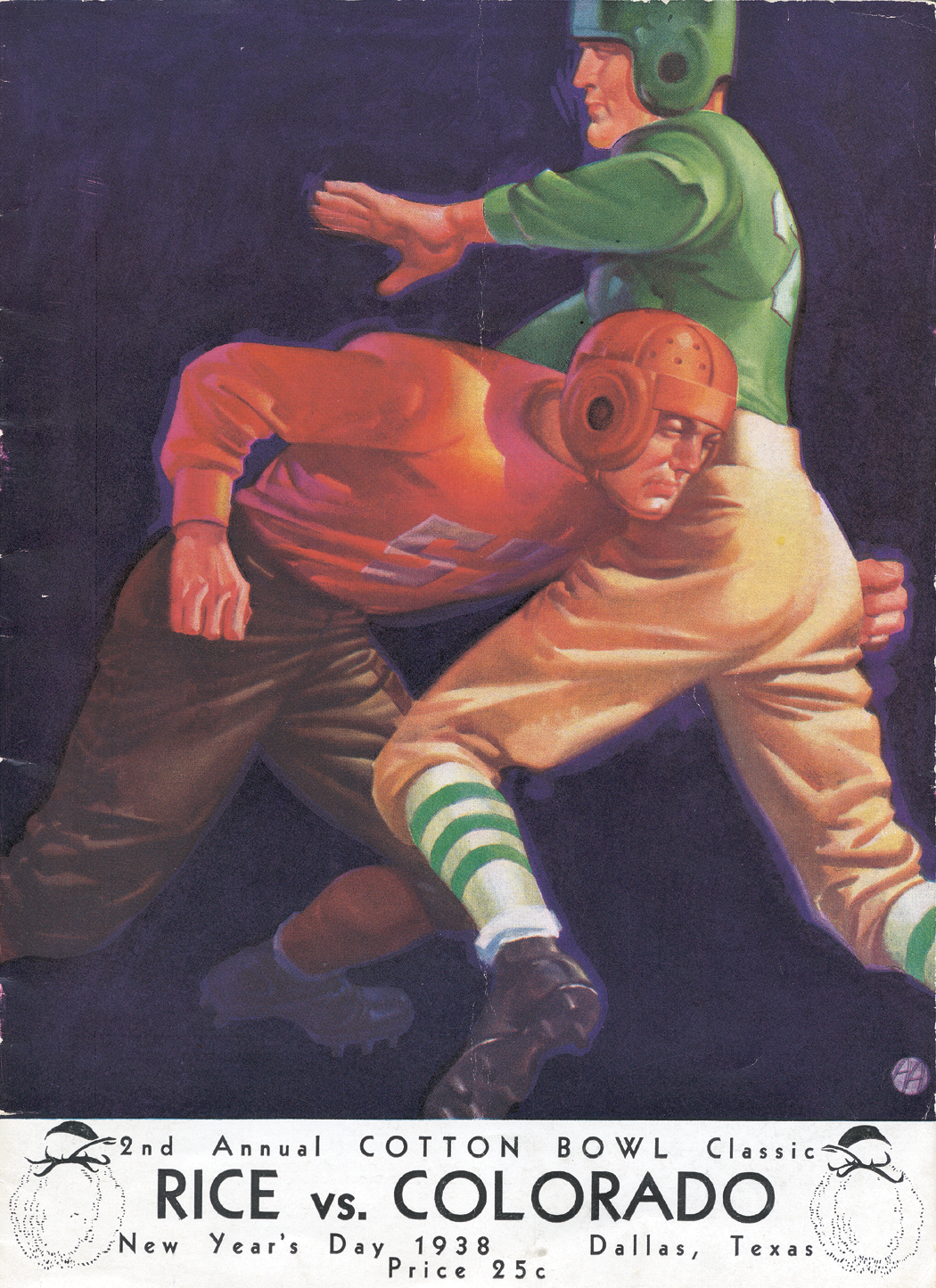
Colorado Buffaloes	Rice Owls
(8–0)	(5–3–2)
Rocky Mountain	SWC
14	28
Head coach: Bunny Oakes	Head coach: James Kitts
AP 17	AP 18
	1	2	3	4	Total
Colorado	14	0	0	0	14
Rice	0	21	7	0	28
- Date: January 1, 1938
- Season: 1937
- Stadium: Cotton Bowl
- Location: Dallas, Texas
- MVP: Byron White (Colorado); Ernie Lain (Rice)
- Referee: Alvin Bell
- Attendance: 37,000–38,000

The Cotton Bowl in Dallas, Texas, hosted the Cotton Bowl Classic.

The 1938 Cotton Bowl Classic was the second edition of the Cotton Bowl Classic, featuring the Colorado Buffaloes and the Rice Owls.

== Background ==
Senior halfback Byron "Whizzer" White was the highlight on a Colorado team that had an unbeaten regular season. A Rhodes Scholar and Heisman Trophy runner-up, the future Supreme Court justice was a consensus All-American who could defend, run, punt, and pass the ball.

Rice were led by sophomores, highlighted by Ernie Lain, dubbed by sportswriter Grantland Rice as "football’s greatest sophomore back." This was the first bowl game for both programs.

== Game summary ==
Colorado sprung up a 14–0 lead after the first quarter on a Joe Antonio touchdown catch and a White interception return for a touchdown. But Lain was determined; he threw two touchdown passes to Jake Schuehle and Ollie Cordill, and then ran for a touchdown to take a 21–14 lead into halftime.

Frank Steen caught a touchdown pass from Lain in the third quarter to seal the game for the Owls, who dominated the Buffaloes on defense for most of the game, who had less first downs than punts. Colorado's next appearance in the Cotton Bowl was in January 1996, while Rice returned in 1950, and went to two more in a span of eight years (1954, 1958).

== Statistics ==
Statistics	Rice	Colorado
First Downs	20	6
Yards Rushing	257	87
Yards Passing	158	8
Total yards	415	95
Punts–Average	4–38.0	9–41.0
Fumbles lost	2	2
Interceptions	1	2
Penalties–Yards	9–65	3–15

== Outstanding Players ==
Colorado

- Byron White (future NFL player and future Supreme Court Justice of the United States)
- Leon Lavington Jr. (future NFL player, Chicago Cardinals, son of Leon Lavington Sr., Colorado State Treasurer)

Rice

- Ernie Lain
