= 1937 Rice Owls football team =

American college football season

1937 Rice Owls football

SWC champion

Cotton Bowl Classic, W 28–14 vs. Colorado
- Conference: Southwest Conference

Ranking
- AP: No. 18
- Record: 6–3–2 (4–1–1 SWC)
- Head coach: Jimmy Kitts (4th season)
- Home stadium: Rice Field

1937 Southwest Conference football standings
| | Conf. | | | | | Overall |
| Team | W | | L | | T | W | | L | | T |
|---|---|---|---|---|---|---|---|---|---|---|
| No. 18 Rice $ | 4 | – | 1 | – | 1 | 6 | – | 3 | – | 2 |
| No. 16 TCU | 3 | – | 1 | – | 2 | 4 | – | 4 | – | 2 |
| No. T–14 Arkansas | 3 | – | 2 | – | 1 | 6 | – | 2 | – | 2 |
| Baylor | 3 | – | 3 | – | 0 | 7 | – | 3 | – | 0 |
| Texas A&M | 2 | – | 2 | – | 2 | 5 | – | 2 | – | 2 |
| SMU | 2 | – | 4 | – | 0 | 5 | – | 6 | – | 0 |
| Texas | 1 | – | 5 | – | 0 | 2 | – | 6 | – | 1 |
$ – Conference champion; Rankings from AP Poll

The 1937 Rice Owls football team was an American football team that represented Rice Institute as a member of the Southwest Conference (SWC) during the 1937 college football season. In its fourth season under head coach Jimmy Kitts, the team compiled a 6–3–2 record (4–1–1 against SWC opponents), won the conference championship, was ranked No. 18 in the final AP Poll, and outscored opponents by a total of 201 to 101.

== Schedule ==
| Date | Opponent | Rank | Site | Result | Attendance | Source |
|---|---|---|---|---|---|---|
| October 2 | at Oklahoma* | | Oklahoma Memorial Stadium; Norman, OK | L 0–6 | 8,000 | |
| October 9 | LSU* | | Rice Field; Houston, TX | L 0–13 | | |
| October 16 | Tulsa* | | Rice Field; Houston, TX | T 0–0 | 8,000 | |
| October 23 | at Texas | | War Memorial Stadium; Austin, TX (rivalry) | W 14–7 | 27,000 | |
| October 30 | No. 12 Auburn* | | Rice Field; Houston, TX | W 13–7 | | |
| November 6 | No. 16 Arkansas | | Rice Field; Houston, TX | W 26–20 | | |
| November 13 | Texas A&M^{†} | No. 15 | Rice Field; Houston, TX | T 6–6 | 18,000 | |
| November 20 | at TCU | No. 15 | Amon G. Carter Stadium; Ft. Worth, TX | L 2–7 | | |
| November 27 | Baylor | | Rice Field; Houston, TX | W 13–7 | 20,000 | |
| December 4 | at SMU | No. 18 | Ownby Stadium; University Park, TX (rivalry) | W 15–7 | | |
| January 1, 1938 | vs. No. 17 Colorado* | No. 18 | Cotton Bowl; Dallas, TX (Cotton Bowl) | W 28–14 | 37,000–38,000 | |
*Non-conference game; ^{†}Homecoming; Rankings from AP Poll released prior to the game
