= 1937 Toledo Rockets football team =

American college football season

1937 Toledo Rockets football
- Conference: Ohio Athletic Conference
- Record: 6–3 (0–0 OAC)
- Head coach: Clarence Spears (2nd season)
- Captain: Marty Slovak
- Home stadium: University Stadium

1937 Ohio Athletic Conference football standings
| | Conf. | | | | | Overall |
| Team | W | | L | | T | W | | L | | T |
|---|---|---|---|---|---|---|---|---|---|---|
| Baldwin–Wallace $ | 4 | – | 0 | – | 0 | 6 | – | 2 | – | 0 |
| Denison | 5 | – | 1 | – | 1 | 6 | – | 1 | – | 1 |
| Case | 4 | – | 1 | – | 0 | 6 | – | 2 | – | 1 |
| Ohio Northern | 4 | – | 1 | – | 3 | 4 | – | 1 | – | 3 |
| Marietta | 4 | – | 1 | – | 0 | 4 | – | 4 | – | 0 |
| Wooster | 5 | – | 2 | – | 0 | 6 | – | 2 | – | 0 |
| Muskingum | 3 | – | 3 | – | 2 | 4 | – | 3 | – | 2 |
| Heidelberg | 4 | – | 4 | – | 1 | 4 | – | 4 | – | 1 |
| Kent State | 3 | – | 3 | – | 1 | 3 | – | 4 | – | 1 |
| Kenyon | 1 | – | 1 | – | 1 | 2 | – | 4 | – | 1 |
| Capital | 3 | – | 4 | – | 0 | 4 | – | 4 | – | 0 |
| Mount Union | 2 | – | 3 | – | 2 | 3 | – | 3 | – | 3 |
| Bowling Green | 2 | – | 3 | – | 1 | 3 | – | 4 | – | 1 |
| John Carroll | 1 | – | 2 | – | 0 | 3 | – | 5 | – | 0 |
| Oberlin | 1 | – | 3 | – | 1 | 2 | – | 3 | – | 3 |
| Ashland | 2 | – | 5 | – | 0 | 2 | – | 6 | – | 0 |
| Wittenberg | 2 | – | 5 | – | 0 | 2 | – | 7 | – | 0 |
| Findlay | 1 | – | 4 | – | 1 | 3 | – | 4 | – | 1 |
| Otterbein | 1 | – | 6 | – | 0 | 2 | – | 6 | – | 0 |
| Toledo | 0 | – | 0 | – | 0 | 6 | – | 3 | – | 0 |
$ – Conference champion

The 1937 Toledo Rockets football team was an American football team that represented Toledo University in the Ohio Athletic Conference (OAC) during the 1937 college football season. In their second season under head coach Clarence Spears, the Rockets compiled a 6–3 record.

== Schedule ==
| Date | Opponent | Site | Result | Attendance | Source |
|---|---|---|---|---|---|
| September 27 | Bluffton* | University Stadium; Toledo, OH | W 26–0 | | |
| October 2 | Georgetown (KY)* | University Stadium; Toledo, OH | W 19–0 | | |
| October 9 | at Ohio Wesleyan* | Delaware, OH | W 6–0 | | |
| October 16 | Akron | University Stadium; Toledo, OH | L 7–21 | | |
| October 23 | Miami (OH)* | University Stadium; Toledo, OH | W 13–7 | | |
| October 30 | at Wayne* | Roosevelt Field; Detroit, MI | W 39–19 | > 6,000 | |
| November 6 | Dayton* | University Stadium; Toledo, OH | W 12–7 | | |
| November 13 | at West Virginia* | Mountaineer Field; Morgantown, WV | L 0–34 | 6,000 | |
| November 25 | at Xavier* | Corcoran Field; Cincinnati, OH | L 6–8 | 8,500 | |
*Non-conference game
