= 1937 Southeastern Conference football season =

- Sport: Football
- Duration: September 24, 1937 – January 1, 1938
- Teams: 13
- Champion: Alabama

SEC seasons
- ← 1936 1938 →

1937 Southeastern Conference football standings
	Conf.					Overall
Team		W		L			W		L
No. 4 Alabama $	6	–	0	–	0	9	–	1	–	0
No. 8 LSU	5	–	1	–	0	9	–	2	–	0
Auburn	4	–	1	–	2	6	–	2	–	3
Vanderbilt	4	–	2	–	0	7	–	2	–	0
Mississippi State	3	–	2	–	0	5	–	4	–	1
Georgia Tech	3	–	2	–	1	6	–	3	–	1
Tennessee	4	–	3	–	0	6	–	3	–	1
Florida	3	–	4	–	0	4	–	7	–	0
Tulane	2	–	3	–	1	5	–	4	–	1
Georgia	1	–	2	–	2	6	–	3	–	2
Ole Miss	0	–	4	–	0	4	–	5	–	1
Kentucky	0	–	5	–	0	4	–	6	–	0
Sewanee	0	–	6	–	0	2	–	7	–	0
$ – Conference champion

The 1937 Southeastern Conference football season was the fifth season of college football played by the member schools of the Southeastern Conference (SEC) and was a part of the 1937 college football season. Alabama compiled a 9–1 overall record, with a conference record of 6–0, and were SEC champion.

== Results and team statistics ==
Conf. rank	Team	Head coach	Overall record	Conf. record	AP final	PPG	PAG
1	Alabama	Frank Thomas	9–1–0 (.900)	6–0–0 (1.000)	No. 4	22.5	3.3
2	LSU	Bernie Moore	9–2–0 (.818)	5–1–0 (.833)	No. 8	21.3	3.0
3	Auburn	Jack Meagher	6–2–3 (.682)	4–1–2 (.714)		3.3	
4	Vanderbilt	Ray Morrison	7–2–0 (.778)	4–2–0 (.667)		13.4	4.7
5	Mississippi State	Ralph Sasse	5–4–1 (.550)	3–2–0 (.600)		11.9	11.7
6	Georgia Tech	William Alexander	6–3–1 (.650)	3–2–1 (.583)		17.7	5.4
7	Tennessee	Robert Neyland	6–3–1 (.650)	4–3–0 (.571)		18.9	4.7
8	Florida	Josh Cody	4–7–0 (.364)	3–4–0 (.429)		7.8	8.1
9	Tulane	Red Dawson	5–4–1 (.550)	2–3–1 (.417)		16.4	6.9
10	Georgia	Harry Mehre	6–3–2 (.636)	1–2–2 (.400)		13.7	5.8
11	Ole Miss	Ed Walker	4–5–1 (.450)	0–4–0 (.000)		12.7	10.6
12	Kentucky	Chet A. Wynne	4–6–0 (.400)	0–5–0 (.000)		9.3	13.0
13	Sewanee	Harry E. Clark	2–7–0 (.222)	0–6–0 (.000)		8.7	23.7

Key
AP final = Rankings from AP sports writers. See 1937 college football rankings
PPG = Average of points scored per game
PAG = Average of points allowed per game

== Schedule ==
Index to colors and formatting
SEC member won
SEC member lost
SEC member tie
SEC teams in **bold**

=== Week One ===
Date	Visiting team	Home team	Site	Result	Attendance	Ref.
September 24	Birmingham–Southern	Auburn	Cramton Bowl • Montgomery, AL	**W** 19–0	15,000	
September 24	Presbyterian	Georgia Tech	Grant Field • Atlanta, GA	**W** 59–0	12,000	
September 25	Howard (AL)	Alabama	Denny Stadium • Tuscaloosa, AL	**W** 41–0	7,500	
September 25	Delta State	Mississippi State	Scott Field • Starkville, MS	**W** 39–0		
September 25	Wake Forest	Tennessee	Shields–Watkins Field • Knoxville, TN	**W** 32–0	7,500	
September 25	Clemson	Tulane	Tulane Stadium • New Orleans, LA	**W** 7–0	15,000	
September 25	Oglethorpe	Georgia	Sanford Stadium • Athens, GA	**W** 60–0	5,000	
September 25	Louisiana Tech	Ole Miss	Hemingway Stadium • Oxford, MS	**W** 13–0		
September 25	Hiwassee	Sewanee	Hardee Field • Sewanee, TN	**W** 40–0		
September 25	**Florida**	LSU	Tiger Stadium • Baton Rouge, LA (rivalry)	**LSU** 19–0	15,000	
September 25	**Kentucky**	Vanderbilt	Dudley Field • Nashville, TN (rivalry)	**VAN** 12–0	5,000	

=== Week Two ===
Date	Visiting team	Home team	Site	Result	Attendance	Ref.
October 1	**Ole Miss**	Temple	Beury Stadium • Philadelphia, PA	**T** 0–0	15,000	
October 2	Texas	**LSU**	Tiger Stadium • Baton Rouge, LA	**W** 9–0	10,000	
October 2	Chicago	**Vanderbilt**	Dudley Field • Nashville, TN	**W** 18–0	5,000	
October 2	Howard (AL)	**Mississippi State**	Scott Field • Starkville, MS	**W** 38–0	4,000	
October 2	Mercer	**Georgia Tech**	Grant Field • Atlanta, GA	**W** 28–0		
October 2	VPI	**Tennessee**	Shields–Watkins Field • Knoxville, TN	**W** 27–0	10,000	
October 2	Stetson	**Florida**	Florida Field • Gainesville, FL	**W** 18–0	4,000	
October 2	South Carolina	**Georgia**	Columbia Municipal Stadium • Columbia, SC (rivalry)	**W** 13–7	15,000	
October 2	**Kentucky**	Xavier	Xavier Stadium • Cincinnati, OH	**W** 6–0		
October 2	**Sewanee**	**Alabama**	Legion Field • Birmingham, AL	**ALA** 65–0	7,000	
October 4	**Auburn**	**Tulane**	Tulane Stadium • New Orleans, LA (rivalry)	0–0		

=== Week Three ===
Date	Visiting team	Home team	Site	Result	Attendance	Ref.
October 8	Tennessee Wesleyan	**Sewanee**	Hardee Field • Sewanee, TN	**W** 25–0		
October 9	South Carolina	**Alabama**	Denny Stadium • Tuscaloosa, AL	**W** 20–0	9,000	
October 9	**LSU**	Rice	Rice Field • Houston, TX	**W** 13–0		
October 9	**Vanderbilt**	Southwestern (TN)	Crump Stadium • Memphis, TN	**W** 17–6	10,000	
October 9	Mississippi College	**Tulane**	Tulane Stadium • New Orleans, LA	**W** 84–0	12,000	
October 9	Clemson	**Georgia**	Sanford Stadium • Athens, GA (rivalry)	**W** 14–0	8,000	
October 9	Saint Louis	**Ole Miss**	Hemingway Stadium • Oxford, MS	**W** 21–0	4,500	
October 9	**Auburn**	Villanova	Shibe Park • Philadelphia, PA	**T** 0–0	15,000	
October 9	**Tennessee**	Duke	Duke Stadium • Durham, NC	**T** 0–0	39,000	
October 9	**Florida**	Temple	Beury Stadium • Philadelphia, PA	**L** 6–7	10,000	
October 9	**Mississippi State**	Texas A&M	Lion Stadium • Tyler, TX	**L** 0–14	16,000	
October 9	**Georgia Tech**	**Kentucky**	McLean Stadium • Lexington, KY	**GT** 32–0	7,500	

=== Week Four ===
Date	Visiting team	Home team	Site	Result	Attendance	Ref.
October 16	**Vanderbilt**	SMU	Cotton Bowl • Dallas, TX	**W** 6–0	7,000	
October 16	**Tulane**	Colgate	Roesch Memorial Stadium • Buffalo, NY	**W** 7–6	32,524	
October 16	Washington & Lee	**Kentucky**	McLean Stadium • Lexington, KY	**W** 41–6		
October 16	**Georgia**	Holy Cross	Fenway Park • Boston, MA	**L** 6–7		
October 16	Duke	**Georgia Tech**	Grant Field • Atlanta, GA	**L** 19–20	26,000	
October 16	**Alabama**	**Tennessee**	Shields–Watkins Field • Knoxville, TN (rivalry)	**ALA** 14–7	25,000	
October 16	**Ole Miss**	**LSU**	Tiger Stadium • Baton Rouge, LA (rivalry)	**LSU** 13–0	25,000	
October 16	**Mississippi State**	**Auburn**	Legion Field • Birmingham, AL	**AUB** 33–7	15,000	
October 16	**Sewanee**	**Florida**	Florida Field • Gainesville, FL	**FLA** 21–0	5,000	

=== Week Five ===
Date	Visiting team	Home team	Site	Result	Attendance	Ref.
October 23	No. 2 **Alabama**	George Washington	Griffith Stadium • Washington, DC	**W** 19–0	24,666	
October 23	Mercer	**Georgia**	Sanford Stadium • Athens, GA	**W** 19–0	5,000	
October 23	Ouachita Baptist	**Ole Miss**	Hemingway Stadium • Oxford, MS	**W** 46–0	2,500	
October 23	Manhattan	**Kentucky**	McLean Stadium • Lexington, KY	**W** 19–0	8,000	
October 23	**Tulane**	North Carolina	Kenan Memorial Stadium • Chapel Hill, NC	**L** 0–13		
October 23	No. 6 **LSU**	No. 20 **Vanderbilt**	Dudley Field • Nashville, TN	**VAN** 7–6	15,000	
October 23	No. 20 **Auburn**	**Georgia Tech**	Grant Field • Atlanta, GA	**AUB** 21–0	19,000	
October 23	**Florida**	**Mississippi State**	Scott Field • Starkville, MS	**MSS** 14–13	7,500	
October 23	**Sewanee**	**Tennessee**	Shields–Watkins Field • Knoxville, TN	**TEN** 32–0	4,000	
^{#}Rankings from AP Poll released prior to game.

=== Week Six ===
Date	Visiting team	Home team	Site	Result	Attendance	Ref.
October 30	Loyola (LA)	No. 17 **LSU**	Tiger Stadium • Baton Rouge, LA	**W** 52–6		
October 30	**Mississippi State**	Centenary	State Fair Stadium • Shreveport, LA	**T** 0–0	10,000	
October 30	No. 12 **Auburn**	Rice	Rice Field • Houston, TX	**L** 7–13		
October 30	**Florida**	Maryland	Byrd Stadium • College Park, MD	**L** 7–13	10,000	
October 30	Tennessee Tech	**Sewanee**	Hardee Field • Sewanee, TN	**L** 6–9		
October 30	**Kentucky**	No. 3 **Alabama**	Denny Stadium • Tuscaloosa, AL	**ALA** 41–0	13,000	
October 30	No. 7 **Vanderbilt**	**Georgia Tech**	Grant Field • Atlanta, GA	**GT** 14–0	20,000	
October 30	**Georgia**	**Tennessee**	Shields–Watkins Field • Knoxville, TN (rivalry)	**TEN** 32–0	17,000	
October 30	**Ole Miss**	**Tulane**	Tulane Stadium • New Orleans, LA (rivalry)	**TUL** 14–7	19,000	
^{#}Rankings from AP Poll released prior to game.

=== Week Seven ===
Date	Visiting team	Home team	Site	Result	Attendance	Ref.
November 5	**Ole Miss**	George Washington	Griffith Stadium • Washington, DC	**W** 27–6	11,800	
November 6	Clemson	**Georgia Tech**	Grant Field • Atlanta, GA (rivalry)	**W** 7–0	12,000	
November 6	South Carolina	**Kentucky**	McLean Stadium • Lexington, KY	**W** 27–7		
November 6	No. 2 **Alabama**	No. 19 **Tulane**	Tulane Stadium • New Orleans, LA	**ALA** 9–6	30,000	
November 6	**Mississippi State**	No. 18 **LSU**	Tiger Stadium • Baton Rouge, LA (rivalry)	**LSU** 41–0	20,000	
November 6	No. 15 **Tennessee**	**Auburn**	Legion Field • Birmingham, AL (rivalry)	**AUB** 20–7	18,000	
November 6	**Sewanee**	**Vanderbilt**	Dudley Field • Nashville, TN (rivalry)	**VAN** 41–0	6,500	
November 6	**Georgia**	**Florida**	Fairfield Stadium • Jacksonville, FL (rivalry)	**FLA** 6–0	20,000	
^{#}Rankings from AP Poll released prior to game.

=== Week Eight ===
Date	Visiting team	Home team	Site	Result	Attendance	Ref.
November 13	Clemson	**Florida**	Florida Field • Gainesville, FL	**L** 9–10	6,000	
November 13	Arkansas	**Ole Miss**	Crump Stadium • Memphis, TN (rivalry)	**L** 6–32	15,000	
November 13	**Kentucky**	Boston College	Fenway Park • Boston, MA	**L** 0–13	3,500	
November 13	**Georgia Tech**	No. 3 **Alabama**	Legion Field • Birmingham, AL (rivalry)	**ALA** 7–0	26,000	
November 13	No. 14 **Auburn**	No. 15 **LSU**	Tiger Stadium • Baton Rouge, LA (rivalry)	**LSU** 9–7	30,000	
November 13	**Tennessee**	**Vanderbilt**	Shields–Watkins Field • Knoxville, TN (rivalry)	**VAN** 13–7	23,000	
November 13	**Sewanee**	**Mississippi State**	Scott Field • Starkville, MS	**MSS** 12–0	6,000	
November 13	**Tulane**	**Georgia**	Sanford Stadium • Athens, GA	**UGA** 7–6	12,000	
^{#}Rankings from AP Poll released prior to game.

=== Week Nine ===
Date	Visiting team	Home team	Site	Result	Attendance	Ref.
November 20	Louisiana Normal	No. 8 **LSU**	Tiger Stadium • Baton Rouge, LA	**W** 52–0	5,000	
November 20	**Auburn**	**Georgia**	Memorial Stadium • Columbus, GA (rivalry)	0–0	16,000	
November 20	**Georgia Tech**	**Florida**	Florida Field • Gainesville, FL	**GT** 12–0	16,000	
November 20	**Sewanee**	**Tulane**	Tulane Stadium • New Orleans, LA	**TUL** 33–7	10,000	
^{#}Rankings from AP Poll released prior to game.

=== Week Ten ===
Date	Visiting team	Home team	Site	Result	Attendance	Ref.
November 25	No. 4 **Alabama**	No. 12 **Vanderbilt**	Dudley Field • Nashville, TN	**ALA** 9–7	22,000	
November 25	**Mississippi State**	**Ole Miss**	Hemingway Stadium • Oxford, MS (rivalry)	**MSS** 9–7	14,000	
November 25	**Tennessee**	**Kentucky**	McLean Stadium • Lexington, KY (rivalry)	**TEN** 13–0	15,000	
November 27	No. 10 **LSU**	**Tulane**	Tulane Stadium • New Orleans, LA (rivalry)	**LSU** 20–7		
November 27	**Auburn**	**Florida**	Fairfield Stadium • Jacksonville, FL (rivalry)	**AUB** 14–0		
November 27	**Georgia Tech**	**Georgia**	Grant Field • Atlanta, GA (rivalry)	6–6	28,000	
^{#}Rankings from AP Poll released prior to game.

=== Week Eleven ===
Date	Visiting team	Home team	Site	Result	Attendance	Ref.
December 4	Duquesne	**Mississippi State**	Scott Field • Starkville, MS	**L** 0–9	6,000	
December 4	**Tennessee**	**Ole Miss**	Crump Stadium • Memphis, TN	**TEN** 32–0	10,000	
December 4	**Kentucky**	**Florida**	Florida Field • Gainesville, FL	**FLA** 6–0		
December 10	**Georgia**	Miami (FL)	Burdine Stadium • Miami, FL	**W** 26–0	20,000	

=== Postseason ===
Date	Visiting team	Home team	Site	Result	Attendance	Ref.
January 1, 1938	No. 4 **Alabama**	No. 3 California	Rose Bowl • Pasadena, CA (Rose Bowl)	**L** 0–13	89,650	
January 1, 1938	No. 8 **LSU**	No. 9 Santa Clara	Tulane Stadium • New Orleans, LA (Sugar Bowl)	**L** 0–6	40,000	
January 1, 1938	Michigan State	**Auburn**	Burdine Stadium • Miami, FL (Orange Bowl)	**W** 6–0	18,970	
^{#}Rankings from AP Poll released prior to game.

== All-conference players ==
The following players were recognized as consensus first-team honors from the Associated Press (AP) and United Press (UP) on the 1937 All-SEC football team:

- Bill Jordan, End, Georgia Tech (AP-1, UP-1)
- Frank Kinard, Tackle, Ole Miss (AP-1, UP-1)
- Leroy Monsky, Guard, Alabama (AP-1, UP-1)
- Ralph Sivell, Guuard, Auburn (AP-1, UP-1)
- Carl Hinkle, Tackle, Vanderbilt (AP-1, UP-1)
- Fletcher Sims, Quarterback, Georgia Tech (AP-1, UP-1)
- Joe Kilgrow, Halfback, Alabama (AP-1, UP-1)
- Walter Mayberry, Halfback, Florida (AP-1, UP-1)

== All-Americans ==
One SEC player was a consensus first-team pick on the 1937 College Football All-America Team:

- Leroy Monsky, Guard, Alabama (AAB, AP, COL, LIB, SN)

Other SEC players receiving All-American honors from at least one selector were:

- Bill Jordan, End, Georgia Tech (AP-2; INS-2; NEA-3)
- Bruiser Kinard, Tackle, Ole Miss (AP-3; UP-1; INS-1; NEA-1; CE-1; SN)
- Jim Ryba, Tackle, Alabama (INS-3; CP-1)
- Eddie Gatto, Tackle, LSU (AP-3)
- Jim Tipton, Tackle, Alabama (UP-3)
- Jim Sivell, Guard, Auburn (AP-3; CP-2)
- Norman Buckner, Guard, Tulane (UP-3)
- Joe Kilgrow, Fullback, Alabama (UP-2 [hb]; INS-1; CP-2 [hb]; SN; NW; NEA-2 [hb])
- George "Pinky" Rohm, Fullback, LSU (INS-3)

== Head coaches ==
Records through the completion of the 1937 season

Team	Head coach	Years at school	Overall record	Record at school	SEC record
Alabama	Frank Thomas	7	83–16–4 (.825)	57–7–3 (.873)	27–2–2 (.903)
Auburn	Jack Meagher	4	49–40–5 (.548)	23–14–5 (.607)	14–10–3 (.574)
Florida	Josh Cody	2	47–43–1 (.522)	8–13–0 (.381)	4–9–0 (.308)
Georgia	Harry Mehre	10	59–34–6 (.626)	59–34–6 (.626)	12–12–2 (.500)
Georgia Tech	William Alexander	18	92–68–12 (.570)	92–68–12 (.570)	11–20–2 (.364)
Kentucky	Chet A. Wynne	4	81–60–9 (.570)	20–19–0 (.513)	5–14–0 (.263)
LSU	Bernie Moore	3	39–17–4 (.683)	27–5–1 (.833)	16–1–0 (.941)
Mississippi State	Ralph Sasse	3	45–15–4 (.734)	20–10–2 (.656)	8–7–0 (.533)
Ole Miss	Ed Walker	8	38–38–8 (.500)	38–38–8 (.500)	7–13–3 (.370)
Sewanee	Harry E. Clark	7	17–43–3 (.294)	17–43–3 (.294)	0–27–0 (.000)
Tennessee	Robert Neyland	11	88–14–8 (.836)	88–14–8 (.836)	17–7–2 (.692)
Tulane	Red Dawson	2	11–7–2 (.600)	11–7–2 (.600)	4–6–2 (.417)
Vanderbilt	Ray Morrison	4	105–56–23 (.633)	21–12–1 (.632)	10–6–1 (.618)

== 1938 NFL draft ==
The following SEC players were selected in the 1938 NFL draft:

Round	Overall pick	Player name	School	Position	NFL team
2	13	Joe Kilgrow	Alabama	Back	Brooklyn Dodgers
3	18	Frank Kinard	Ole Miss	Tackle	Brooklyn Dodgers
5	33	Ed Merlin	Vanderbilt	Offensive Guard	Brooklyn Dodgers
5	38	Marion Konemann	Georgia Tech	Back	New York Giants
5	39	Dave Price	Mississippi State	Center	Washington Redskins
7	53	Leroy Monsky	Alabama	Offensive Guard	Brooklyn Dodgers
8	61	Walter Mayberry	Florida	Back	Cleveland Rams
8	69	Bill Hartman	Georgia	Fullback	Washington Redskins
8	70	Fletcher Sims	Georgia Tech	Back	Chicago Bears
10	83	Jim Sivell	Auburn	Offensive Guard	Brooklyn Dodgers
11	92	Carl Hinkle	Vanderbilt	Center	Philadelphia Eagles
11	97	Pete Tinsley	Georgia	Back	Green Bay Packers
