= 1937–38 NCAA football bowl games =

College football postseason game series

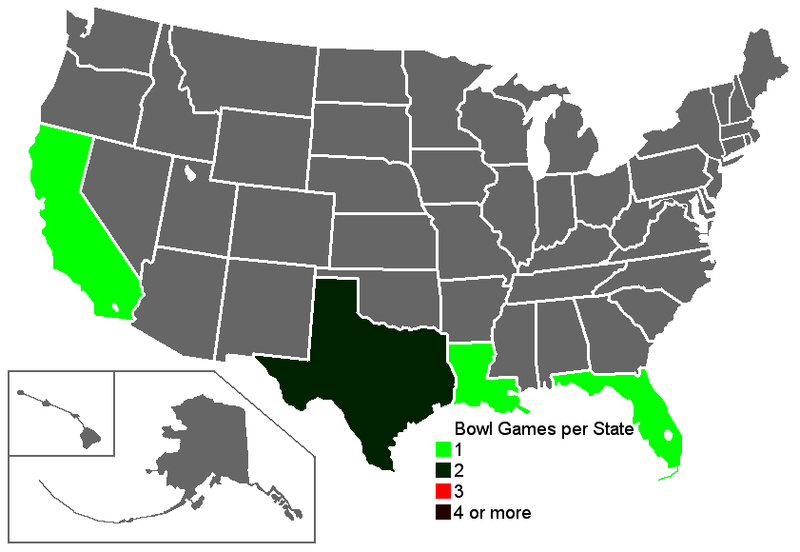
- Number of bowl games per state
- Season: 1937
- Number of bowls: 5
- All-star games: East–West Shrine Game
- Bowl games: January 1, 1938
- Champions: Pittsburgh Panthers (AP, Dickinson); California Golden Bears (Dunkel)
Bowl record by conference
Conference	Bowls	Record	Final AP poll
Independents	3	2–1 (0.667)	8
SEC	3	1–2 (0.333)	2
Pacific Coast	1	1–0 (1.000)	1
SWC	1	1–0 (1.000)	3
Border	1	0–1 (0.000)	0
Rocky Mountain	1	0–1 (0.000)	1
Big Six	0	0–0 (–)	1
Big Ten	0	0–0 (–)	2
Southern	0	0–0 (–)	2

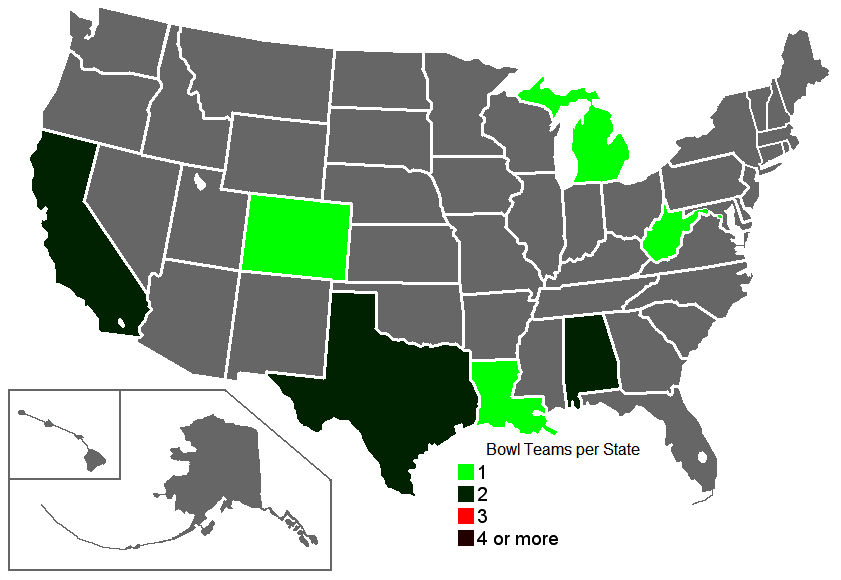
Number of bowl teams per state

The 1937–38 NCAA football bowl games were the final games of the National Collegiate Athletic Association (NCAA) 1937 college football season and featured five bowl games, down one from the prior season, as the Bacardi Bowl was not held. All five bowls were played on January 1, 1938. Notably, the Orange Bowl was first held in Burdine Stadium, which was later renamed for the bowl game itself in 1959. The national championship, according to recognized selectors, was split by Pittsburgh and California.

== Poll rankings ==
The below table lists top teams (per the AP poll taken after the completion of the regular season), their win–loss records (prior to bowl games), and the bowls they later played in.

AP	Team	W–L	Conf.	Bowl
1	Pittsburgh Panthers	9–0–1	Ind.	—
2	California Golden Bears	9–0–1	PCC	Rose Bowl
3	Fordham Rams	7–0–1	Ind.	—
4	Alabama Crimson Tide	9–0	SEC	Rose Bowl
5	Minnesota Golden Gophers	6–2	Big Ten	— †
6	Villanova Wildcats	8–0–1	Ind.	—
7	Dartmouth Indians	7–0–2	Ind.	—
8	LSU Tigers	9–1	SEC	Sugar Bowl
T9	Notre Dame Fighting Irish	6–2–1	Ind.	—
T9	Santa Clara Broncos	8–0	Ind.	Sugar Bowl
11	Nebraska Cornhuskers	6–1–2	Big Six	—
12	Yale Bulldogs	6–1–1	Ind.	—
13	Ohio State Buckeyes	6–2	Big Ten	— †
T14	Arkansas Razorbacks	6–2–2	SWC	—
T14	Holy Cross Crusaders	8–0–2	Ind.	—
16	TCU Horned Frogs	4–4–2	SWC	—
17	Colorado Buffaloes	8–0	RMAC	Cotton Bowl Classic
18	Rice Owls	4–3–2	SWC	Cotton Bowl Classic
19	North Carolina Tar Heels	7–1–1	Southern	—
20	Duke Blue Devils	7–2–1	Southern	—

† The Big Ten Conference did not allow its members to participate in bowl games until the 1947 Rose Bowl.

== Bowl schedule ==
Rankings are from the final regular season AP Poll.

Date	Game	Site	Teams	Affiliations	Results
Jan. 1	Rose Bowl	Rose Bowl; Pasadena, California	#2 California Golden Bears (9–0–1) #4 Alabama Crimson Tide (9–0)	PCC; SEC	California 13; Alabama 0
Jan. 1	Sugar Bowl	Tulane Stadium; New Orleans, Louisiana	#9 Santa Clara Broncos (8–0) #8 LSU Tigers (9–1)	Independent; SEC	Santa Clara 6 LSU 0
Jan. 1	Orange Bowl	Burdine Stadium; Miami, Florida	Auburn Tigers (5–2–3); Michigan State Spartans (8–1)	SEC; Independent	Auburn 6 Michigan State 0
Jan. 1	Sun Bowl	Kidd Field; El Paso, Texas	West Virginia Mountaineers (7–1–1); Texas Tech Red Raiders (8–3)	Independent; Border	West Virginia 7 Texas Tech 6
Jan. 1	Cotton Bowl Classic	Cotton Bowl; Dallas, Texas	#18 Rice Owls (5–3–2) #17 Colorado Buffaloes (8–0)	SWC; Rocky Mountain	Rice 28; Colorado 14

=== Conference performance in bowl games ===
Conference	Games	Record			Bowls	
Conference	Games	W	L	Pct.	Won	Lost
Independents	3	2	1	.667	Sugar, Sun	Orange
SEC	3	1	2	.333	Orange	Rose, Sugar
Pacific Coast	1	1	0	1.000	Rose	—
SWC	1	1	0	1.000	Cotton	—
Border	1	0	1	.000	—	Sun
Rocky Mountain	1	0	1	.000	—	Cotton

== See also ==
- Prairie View Bowl
