= Sandy Sanford =

American football player and coach (1916–2000)

No. 34
- Position: End

Personal information
- Born: June 15, 1916; Plainview, Arkansas, U.S.
- Died: March 25, 2000 (aged 83); Lubbock, Texas, U.S.
- Listed height: 6 ft 1 in (1.85 m)
- Listed weight: 210 lb (95 kg)

Career information
- College: Arkansas Tech; Alabama
- NFL draft: 1940: 15th round, 138th overall pick

Career history

Playing
- Washington Redskins (1940)

Coaching
- Paragould HS (AR) (1948–1950) Head coach; Tarleton State (1951–1959) Head coach

Operations
- Paragould HS (AR) (1948–1951) Athletic director; Tarleton State (?–1960) Athletic director

Career NFL statistics
- Receptions: 1
- Receiving yards: 13
- Stats at Pro Football Reference

Hayward Allen "Sandy" Sanford (June 15, 1916 – March 25, 2000) was an American professional football player and coach. He was selected 138th overall in the 15th round of the 1940 NFL draft. He played professionally as an end in the National Football League (NFL) for the Washington Redskins. Sanford played college football at the University of Alabama. He was recruited by Bear Bryant, an assistant at Alabama at the time. He was also a kicker and won two games by kicking field goals for the Crimson Tide during the 1937 season that put them in the 1938 Rose Bowl. Sanford left the NFL after one season to join the United States Navy and served as an officer during World War II. He was the head football coach at Tarleton State College—now known as Tarleton State University–from 1951 to 1959.

Sanford was the head football coach at athletic director at Paragould High School in Paragould, Arkansas from 1948 to 1951. He succeeded Willie Zapalac as head football coach at Tarleton State in 1951. Sanford was also the athletic director at Tarleton State until resigning in early 1960 to work for a sports goods company in Texas.

== Head coaching record ==
=== Junior college football ===
Year	Team	Overall	Conference	Standing	Bowl/playoffs
Tarleton State Plowboys (Pioneer Conference) (1951–1960)
1951	Tarleton State	3–5–1	1–2–1	T–3rd	
1952	Tarleton State	6–3	2–2	T–2nd	
1953	Tarleton State	3–6	2–2	T–2nd	
1954	Tarleton State	5–3–1	3–0–1	1st	
1955	Tarleton State	5–4	1–3	T–3rd	
1956	Tarleton State	7–1–1	3–1	T–1st	
1957	Tarleton State	2–7	1–3	4th	
1958	Tarleton State	1–9	0–6	7th	
1959	Tarleton State	1–8	0–5	6th	
Tarleton State:		33–46–3	13–24–2		
Total:		33–46–3			
National championship Conference title Conference division title or championship game berth
