= Bill Jordan (American football) =

American football player and coach

Playing career
- 1937: Georgia Tech
- Position(s): End

Coaching career (HC unless noted)
- 1938: Georgia Tech (ends)

Accomplishments and honors

Awards
- First-team All-SEC (1937)

William Jordan was a college football player and coach for the Georgia Tech Yellow Jackets. A prominent end, he was selected All-SEC in 1937. He was a key feature in the defeat of Vanderbilt. Jordan was selected for the All-Alexander era team, and the Tech athletics hall of fame. He later coached the ends for Tech.
