= Walter Mayberry =

American football player (1915–1944)

- "Tiger"

No. 64 – Florida Gators
- Position: Halfback

Personal information
- Born: March 14, 1915; Daytona Beach, Florida, U.S.
- Died: by March 5, 1944 (aged 28); Rabaul, New Britain
- Listed height: 5 ft 11 in (1.80 m)
- Listed weight: 172 lb (78 kg)

Career information
- High school: Mainland (Daytona Beach, Florida)
- College: Florida (1934–1937)

Awards and highlights
- First-team All-SEC (1937); Second-team All-SEC (1936); University of Florida Athletic Hall of Fame; Florida Sports Hall of Fame (1964)

Walter Thomas "Tiger" Mayberry (March 14, 1915 – by March 5, 1944) was an American college football player, and later a U.S. Marine Corps fighter pilot. Mayberry was a casualty of World War II; dying in a Japanese prisoner of war camp after his plane was shot down.

Mayberry was a prominent running back for the University of Florida's Florida Gators football team. A triple-threat man, he also passed and punted. When punting he excelled at placing balls in the "coffin corner." As was typical in the 1930s, he played both offense and defense, posting multiple school records for interceptions. Mayberry was selected as a sixth round pick of the 1938 NFL draft, but never played in the NFL. He was the first Gator drafted into the league.

== Early life ==
Mayberry was born on March 14, 1915, in Daytona Beach, Florida, and attended Mainland High School in his hometown. His father Tom operated a small grocery store. His mother was Helena Marie Murphy of Lewiston, Maine. He played for the Mainland Buccaneers high school football team, and suffered a broken neck while playing.

== University of Florida ==
In the fall of 1934, Mayberry enrolled as a freshman and attended the University of Florida in Gainesville, Florida. He was a member of the Sigma Phi Epsilon fraternity.

=== Football ===
After playing freshman football for a season, he played for the varsity Florida Gators football team from 1935 to 1937. His first coach head coach was Josh Cody, and his next was Dutch Stanley. Stanley called Mayberry the best player he ever saw. In three seasons of college football, he amassed 2,019 yards of total offense, including 713 yards passing and 1,306 yards rushing; on defense, he accumulated eleven interceptions. (Note: His eleven interceptions were a school record until it was broken by Bruce Bennett in 1965.)

As a junior in 1936 Mayberry played at halfback and substitute quarterback. He returned a kick for 75 yards for a touchdown in a victory over the Stetson Hatters. Mayberry also provided most of the yardage in an 18–7 win over the Sewanee Tigers. He earned second-team All-Southeastern Conference honors at the conclusion of the season.

Mayberry

As the senior team captain in 1937, Mayberry ranked second in the country with 818 rushing yards; only Byron White exceeded Mayberry's rushing total that year. (Note: White led the country with 1,121 rushing yards.) During the 1937 season, Mayberry also intercepted six passes when the Gators' opponents only threw 57 balls, and was a first-team All-SEC selection by the conference coaches and sportswriters on behalf of the Associated Press. The 1937 team defeated the Georgia Bulldogs in their annual rivalry game for the first time in eight years. Mayberry rushed for 83 yards against Georgia. He also starred in a close loss to coach Pop Warner's Temple Owls, keeping the 10,000 spectators "in an uproar for nearly three periods."

In fall 1937, scout Henry McLemore of the United Press wrote in a piece on Southern football: "And when the time comes to pick the outstanding players of the year it wouldn't be a bad idea to mention "Tiger" Mayberry, captain and halfback of Florida's team . . . given a stronger eleven to work with, and Mayberry would be in the headlines Saturday after Saturday." McLemore later added: "I have not seen a better back in six years than Mayberry . . . Wallace Wade, Bernie Moore, and Harry Mehre all told me that Mayberry was the best back in the South, one of the best they have seen in half a dozen years and certainly the best that Florida has produced in a decade." Another sportswriter quipped, "The south says: All-America scouts should keep an eye on "Tiger" Mayberry, Florida back ... The guy has it."

== NFL ==
In the 1938 NFL draft, Mayberry was taken with the 61st overall pick, the first of the eighth round, by the Cleveland Rams. He said he would play professional football if the Rams made him an offer he considered "worthwhile." He went on to say: "If the offer is right I will sign to play pro football next year." After entertaining an offer, and another for a potential coaching position at Florida, he declined both. During this same time he was a tire salesman and District Commissioner of the National semi-pro Baseball Congress.

== World War II ==
During the run-up to the United States' participation in World War II, Mayberry enlisted in the United States Navy Reserve at Atlanta on May 23, 1941, and was assigned to naval flight training. He transferred to Pensacola Naval Air Station as an aviation cadet near the end of 1941, and joined the United States Marine Corps Reserve as a fighter pilot on July 2, 1942. He was later sent to San Francisco, and from there to the Pacific Theater of Operations to fight against enemy Japanese forces. Mayberry served with Marine fighter squadron VMF-123, flying F4U Corsair fighter aircraft, and was credited with shooting down three Japanese planes in battle over Vella Lavella Island; some sources also say it was four, with a fifth as probable.

Mayberry last radioed as he piloted his aircraft over a stretch of water between two Solomon Islands, and was shot down near Bougainville Island on August 30. He was subsequently captured by Japanese forces, and died in a Japanese prisoner of war camp at Rabaul in New Britain of Papua New Guinea sometime after September 6, 1943. Japanese records indicate that he died in an Allied air raid on March 5, 1944, but other records suggest he was executed by the Japanese at an earlier date. He was buried at the Jefferson Barracks National Cemetery.

== Awards and decorations ==

Badge	Naval Aviator Badge		
1st row	Distinguished Flying Cross		Purple Heart
2nd row	Navy Presidential Unit Citation	Prisoner of War Medal	American Defense Service Medal
3rd row	American Campaign Medal	Asiatic–Pacific Campaign Medal with two bronze service stars	World War II Victory Medal

== Posthumous honors ==
Mayberry was inducted into the University of Florida Athletic Hall of Fame as a "Gator Great." He was also inducted into the Florida Sports Hall of Fame in 1964.

Gator alumni from Daytona Beach created an athletic scholarship in his honor.

== See also ==
- List of University of Florida Athletic Hall of Fame members

== Books ==
- Carlson, Norm (2007). University of Florida Football Vault: The History of the Florida Gators. Atlanta, Georgia: Whitman Publishing, LLC. ISBN 978-0-7948-2298-9.
- Cohen, Marty (1995). Gator Tales. Wichita Eagle. ISBN 9781880652459.
- Couch, Ernie (July 30, 2001). SEC Football Trivia. Thomas Nelson. ISBN 9781418571788.
- Gamble, Bruce (2013). Target: Rabaul: The Allied Siege of Japan's Most Infamous Stronghold. Quarto Publishing Group USA. ISBN 9781610589574.
- Martin, Buddy (2006). The Boys from Old Florida:Inside Gator Nation. Sports Publishing LLC. ISBN 9781582611730.
- MacCambridge, Michael (2005). ESPN College Football Encyclopedia.
- McEwen, Tom (1974). The Gators: A Story of Florida Football. Huntsville, Alabama: The Strode Publishers. ISBN 0-87397-025-X.
- University of Florida. 2016 Florida Football Media Guide (PDF). Gainesville, Florida: University Athletic Association. Archived from the original (PDF) on September 19, 2016.
