= Young Bussey =

American football player (1917–1945)

No. 37
- Position: Quarterback

Personal information
- Born: October 4, 1917; Timpson, Texas, U.S.
- Died: January 7, 1945 (aged 27); Lingayen Gulf, Philippines

Career information
- High school: San Jacinto (TX)
- College: LSU
- NFL draft: 1940: 20th round, 187th overall pick

Career history
- 1940: Newark Bears
- 1941: Chicago Bears

Awards and highlights
- NFL champion (1941); NFL All-Star (1941); Second-team All-SEC (1937)

Other information
- Military career
- Allegiance: United States
- Branch: U.S. Navy
- Service years: 1942–1945
- Rank: Lieutenant
- Conflicts: World War II: Pacific War; Battle of Guam; Gilbert and Marshall Islands campaign; Battle of Kwajalein; Mariana and Palau Islands campaign; Battle of Peleliu; Philippines campaign; Battle of Leyte; Battle of Luzon; Battle of Lingayen Gulf †

Ruey Young Bussey (October 4, 1917 – January 7, 1945) was a professional American football quarterback for the Chicago Bears of the National Football League (NFL). An all-star during his only season in the NFL, Bussey was killed in action during World War II. He was the only Bears player to die in the war.

== Biography ==
=== Early life ===
Ruey Young Bussey was born in Timpson, Texas, the youngest of Katherine Lee "Katie" Bussey (née Hughes) and Thomas Wade "Tom" Bussey's 13 children. The family later moved to Humble, located near Houston. Tom worked several odd jobs, before landing a supervisory position at a firm that manufactured train equipment. However, he abandoned the family in 1928, and later died in March 1935. When Katie became the head of the household, Young worked to help support his family by delivering milk, waking up at 3:00 AM to walk his delivery route.

Bussey excelled at sports, such as football, baseball, boxing, wrestling, swimming, diving, water polo, track and his favorite, basketball. By age 12, he had become so coordinated that his teacher had to “rig” the softball teams during recess in an attempt to prevent him from dominating the game. As a teenager, Bussey attended San Jacinto High School, where his athletic skills and brash antics drew large crowds at games and attracted the attention of local sports writers. His classmates at San Jacinto included Walter Cronkite and Denton Cooley.

=== College career ===
Bussey played football at LSU on a scholarship arranged by Senator Huey Long. While there, he became a team captain and led LSU in rushing in 1937, and in passing in both 1937 and 1938. He and teammate Ken Kavanaugh were also invited to try out for the Chicago Bears.

Despite the time constraints of playing a sport and continuing to support his family via his milk delivery route, Bussey still managed to graduate with top grades and a degree in petroleum engineering.

=== Professional career ===
Bussey was drafted by the Chicago Bears in the 20th round of the 1940 NFL draft. He quickly established a brazen reputation for himself, once telling Bears owner/coach George Halas that "he'd come to be a winner and the coach needed to either trade established quarterback Sid Luckman or keep him on as Bussey's backup." Teammate Bulldog Turner later opined that "[c]oaching Young was nearly impossible." Halas assigned Bussey to the American Association's Newark Bears, which Halas had recently purchased. Bussey excelled in Newark, becoming the AA's passing leader.

Bussey finally made the Bears' squad in 1941, as Luckman's backup. He scored his first points in the NFL on October 5, throwing two touchdowns in a 48-21 road victory over the Cleveland Rams. He repeated this feat on October 12, in a 53–7 home victory over the Chicago Cardinals. Bussey quickly became a favorite amongst Bears fans; as biographer Ralph Cushman wrote, "he had become the Bears' instant offense. The crowd quickly recognized his potential for electric action and screamed approval when he trotted into the arena. Actual records fail to define just how prolific Young was from the standpoint of points per minute of play...[he] often was sent in for a quick score and then was held in reserve as the Bears' defense dug in to preserve the lead."

Bussey appeared in 10 games during the 1941 regular season, completing 13 of 40 passes for 353 yards, five touchdowns, and three interceptions. He also tallied two interceptions while playing defense, as well as one 40-yard punt return. The final day of the season was December 7, the same day Pearl Harbor was bombed, and the playoffs continued even after the U.S. declared war on Japan. The Bears defeated the New York Giants, 37–9, in the 1941 NFL Championship Game on December 21; Bussey attempted just one pass, an 8-yard completion.

While waiting to be drafted, Bussey took a job building Liberty ships for the Houston Shipbuilding Corporation. He briefly attended the Bears' training camp in the summer of 1942, but Halas was committed to starting Luckman at quarterback. On August 28, Bussey played in the 1942 College All-Star Game in Chicago before a crowd of 101,103 spectators, throwing one touchdown in a 21–0 victory over the college players. Shortly after the game ended, he informed Halas of his intent to enlist. He did so the very next day, joining the Naval Reserve.

=== Military service and death ===
Bussey was sent to Officer Candidate School, attained the rank of lieutenant (junior grade), and was assigned to USS Warren (APA-53), an attack transport active in the Pacific Theater. He received a commendation from Admiral Raymond A. Spruance, commander of the U.S. Fifth Fleet, for his actions as an assistant beachmaster during the Battle of Guam in 1944. Bussey also saw action at Kwajalein, Peleliu, Leyte, and Luzon, participating in a total of 10 amphibious assaults. He was then named Warren's head beachmaster for the upcoming Invasion of Lingayen Gulf. By this point, Bussey had become pessimistic about his chances of survival; while home on leave shortly before the invasion, Bussey confessed to his older brother Keefer (himself a combat engineer in the Army) that he believed he "would not come out of his next landing alive," and gave Keefer his commemorative watch from the 1941 Championship Game. The night before General Walter Krueger's Sixth Army landed on the beaches of Lingayen Gulf, Bussey turned over his personal effects to Warren's chaplain, telling him, "Tomorrow I make my ascension. Will you see that my mother gets these?"

True to his prediction, Bussey was killed on January 7, 1945, when his landing craft took a direct hit from a Japanese mortar after getting stuck on a coral reef 75 yards (69 m) from the beach. The blast threw Bussey and most of the crew into the water; eyewitnesses reported that Bussey was struck in his left shoulder and chest, and that his left arm may have been completely blown off. He was last seen signalling his men with his right arm to take cover. Most of the crew of the landing craft were rescued, but Bussey was not among them, and his body was never recovered.
