= 1937 Kentucky Wildcats football team =

American college football season

1937 Kentucky Wildcats football
- Conference: Southeastern Conference
- Record: 4–6 (0–5 SEC)
- Head coach: Chet A. Wynne (4th season)
- Captain: Joe Hagan
- Home stadium: McLean Stadium

1937 Southeastern Conference football standings
	Conf.					Overall
Team		W		L			W		L
No. 4 Alabama $	6	–	0	–	0	9	–	1	–	0
No. 8 LSU	5	–	1	–	0	9	–	2	–	0
Auburn	4	–	1	–	2	6	–	2	–	3
Vanderbilt	4	–	2	–	0	7	–	2	–	0
Mississippi State	3	–	2	–	0	5	–	4	–	1
Georgia Tech	3	–	2	–	1	6	–	3	–	1
Tennessee	4	–	3	–	0	6	–	3	–	1
Florida	3	–	4	–	0	4	–	7	–	0
Tulane	2	–	3	–	1	5	–	4	–	1
Georgia	1	–	2	–	2	6	–	3	–	2
Ole Miss	0	–	4	–	0	4	–	5	–	1
Kentucky	0	–	5	–	0	4	–	6	–	0
Sewanee	0	–	6	–	0	2	–	7	–	0
$ – Conference champion

The 1937 Kentucky Wildcats football team was an American football team that represented the University of Kentucky as a member of the Southeastern Conference (SEC) during the 1937 college football season. In their fourth season under head coach Chet A. Wynne, the Wildcats compiled an overall record of 4–6 record with a mark of 0–5 against conference opponents, finished in 12th place in the SEC, and were outscored by a total of 130 to 93. The team played its home games at McLean Stadium in Lexington, Kentucky.

== Schedule ==
Date	Opponent	Site	Result	Attendance	Source
September 25	at Vanderbilt	Dudley Field; Nashville, TN (rivalry)	L 0–12	5,000	
October 2	at Xavier*	Xavier Stadium; Cincinnati, OH	W 6–0		
October 9	Georgia Tech	McLean Stadium; Lexington, KY	L 0–32	7,500	
October 16	Washington & Lee*	McLean Stadium; Lexington, KY	W 41–6		
October 23	Manhattan*	McLean Stadium; Lexington, KY	W 19–0	8,000	
October 30	at No. 3 Alabama	Denny Stadium; Tuscaloosa, AL	L 0–41	13,000	
November 6	South Carolina*	McLean Stadium; Lexington, KY	W 27–7		
November 13	at Boston College*	Fenway Park; Boston, MA	L 0–13	3,500	
November 25	Tennessee	McLean Stadium; Lexington, KY (rivalry)	L 0–13	15,000	
December 4	at Florida	Florida Field; Gainesville, FL (rivalry)	L 0–6		
*Non-conference game; Rankings from Coaches' Poll released prior to the game
