= Bill Hartman =

American football player (1915–2006)

No. 34
- Positions: Quarterback, running back

Personal information
- Born: March 17, 1915; Thomaston, Georgia, U.S.
- Died: March 16, 2006 (aged 90); Athens, Georgia, U.S.
- Listed height: 6 ft 0 in (1.83 m)
- Listed weight: 188 lb (85 kg)

Career information
- College: Georgia
- NFL draft: 1938: 8th round, 69th overall pick

Career history
- Washington Redskins (1938)

Awards and highlights
- First-team All-SEC (1937)

Career NFL statistics
- Passing attempts: 77
- Passing completions: 38
- Completion percentage: 49.4%
- TD–INT: 4–10
- Passing yards: 558
- Passer rating: 51.1
- Rushing yards: 195
- Stats at Pro Football Reference
- College Football Hall of Fame

William Coleman Hartman Jr. (March 17, 1915 – March 16, 2006) was an American professional football player who was a running back in the National Football League (NFL) for the Washington Redskins. He played college football for the Georgia Bulldogs.

== Football career ==
Hartman was born in Thomaston, Georgia, in 1915. He started playing football in Madison, Georgia, where his talents soon became evident. He played college football for the Georgia Bulldogs, starting in 1935. Hartman distinguished himself at both fullback and linebacker for the Bulldogs. His best game is considered to be his performance in a 7–7 tie against the Fordham Rams in 1936, which knocked Fordham out of contention for the Rose Bowl.

In his final year in 1937, Hartman was an All-American and All-SEC player. He also became a punter, kicking the ball 82 yards against the Tulane Green Wave. He was selected in the eighth round of the 1938 NFL draft. After graduation, he signed with the Washington Redskins, who wanted him as a backup to Sammy Baugh. However, Baugh was injured in the preseason and Hartman started for the first six games of the season. He threw the winning pass in a 24–22 win over the Philadelphia Eagles in his first game in the NFL.

Hartman completed two years in the NFL to work as an assistant coach to Wally Butts in a Bulldogs team that won both the Orange Bowl and Rose Bowl. Sports Illustrated named him as a member of the "Sports Illustrated Silver Anniversary All America Team" in 1962. He was further acknowledged by becoming a member of the Georgia Sports Hall of Fame in 1981 and the College Football Hall of Fame in 1984

== Subsequent career ==
He served in World War II in the United States Army Counter Intelligence Corps. After the war, he worked in the insurance business as well as coaching in 1956. He became an Athens, Georgia, community leader serving as the President of a number of community organisations including the Chamber of Commerce. He served on the Athens City Council between 1957 and 1960 including a short stint as Mayor Pro Tem in 1960.

Hartman became a leading supporter of the University of Georgia becoming a trustee and President of the Alumni Association. In 1960, he became chairman of the Georgia Student Educational Foundation which he held for many years. In 1992, the university announced the creation of the "Bill Hartman Award" for athletes who had distinguished themselves as alumni with recipients including Fran Tarkenton and Pierre Howard, who held the position of Lieutenant Governor of Georgia.

In the early 1970s, he returned as a volunteer to coach the kicking team. In this capacity, he coached a number of players including John Kasay, Bucky Dilts, Kevin Butler and Todd Peterson who went on to play in the NFL.

Hartman died of a short illness in Athens the day before his 91st birthday and was buried in that city's Oconee Hill Cemetery.
