= 1937 Tennessee Volunteers football team =

American college football season

1937 Tennessee Volunteers football
- Conference: Southeastern Conference
- Record: 6–3–1 (4–3 SEC)
- Head coach: Robert Neyland (11th season)
- Offensive scheme: Single-wing
- Home stadium: Shields–Watkins Field

1937 Southeastern Conference football standings
	Conf.					Overall
Team		W		L			W		L
No. 4 Alabama $	6	–	0	–	0	9	–	1	–	0
No. 8 LSU	5	–	1	–	0	9	–	2	–	0
Auburn	4	–	1	–	2	6	–	2	–	3
Vanderbilt	4	–	2	–	0	7	–	2	–	0
Mississippi State	3	–	2	–	0	5	–	4	–	1
Georgia Tech	3	–	2	–	1	6	–	3	–	1
Tennessee	4	–	3	–	0	6	–	3	–	1
Florida	3	–	4	–	0	4	–	7	–	0
Tulane	2	–	3	–	1	5	–	4	–	1
Georgia	1	–	2	–	2	6	–	3	–	2
Ole Miss	0	–	4	–	0	4	–	5	–	1
Kentucky	0	–	5	–	0	4	–	6	–	0
Sewanee	0	–	6	–	0	2	–	7	–	0
$ – Conference champion

The 1937 Tennessee Volunteers (variously Tennessee, UT, or the Vols) represented the University of Tennessee in the 1937 college football season. Playing as a member of the Southeastern Conference (SEC), the team was led by head coach Robert Neyland, in his 11th year, and played their home games at Shields–Watkins Field in Knoxville, Tennessee. They finished the season with a record of six wins, three losses and one tie (6–3–1 overall, 4–3 in the SEC). The team had the most ever punts per game of 13.9

== Schedule ==
Date	Opponent	Rank	Site	Result	Attendance	Source
September 25	Wake Forest*		Shields–Watkins Field; Knoxville, TN	W 32–0	7,500	
October 2	VPI*		Shields–Watkins Field; Knoxville, TN	W 27–0	10,000	
October 9	at Duke*		Duke Stadium; Durham, NC	T 0–0	39,000	
October 16	Alabama		Shields–Watkins Field; Knoxville, TN (rivalry)	L 7–14	25,000	
October 23	Sewanee		Shields–Watkins Field; Knoxville, TN	W 32–0	4,000	
October 30	Georgia		Shields–Watkins Field; Knoxville, TN (rivalry)	W 32–0	17,000	
November 6	at Auburn	No. 15	Legion Field; Birmingham, AL (rivalry)	L 7–20	18,000	
November 13	Vanderbilt^{†}		Shields–Watkins Field; Knoxville, TN (rivalry)	L 7–13	23,000	
November 25	at Kentucky		McLean Stadium; Lexington, KY (rivalry)	W 13–0	15,000	
December 4	vs. Ole Miss		Crump Stadium; Memphis, TN (rivalry)	W 32–0	10,000	
*Non-conference game; ^{†}Homecoming; Rankings from AP Poll released prior to the game
