= Leroy Monsky =

American football player (1916–1981)

Profile
- Position: Guard

Personal information
- Born: February 6, 1916; Montgomery, Alabama, U.S.
- Died: August 12, 1981 (aged 65); New York, New York, U.S.

Career information
- High school: Sidney Lanier (Montgomery)
- College: Alabama
- NFL draft: 1938: 7th round, 53rd overall pick

Awards and highlights
- Consensus All-American (1937); Jacobs Blocking Trophy (1937); First-team All-SEC (1937)

Leroy Gerald Monsky Sr. (April 12, 1916 – August 12, 1981) was an All-American football player.

Monsky was born in Montgomery, Alabama, in 1916. He was an All-State football player at Sidney Lanier High School.

After high school, Monsky enrolled at the University of Alabama where he played on the Crimson Tide football teams from 1935 to 1937. He was selected as a consensus All-American in 1937 at the guard position. He was the captain of the 1937 Alabama football team that played in the 1938 Rose Bowl. Noted sports writer Grantland Rice said of Monsky: "Leroy Monsky, amazingly fast for his size and power, was outstanding on both offense and defense and was a key man in the Alabama attack which specializes in the use of the guards . . . led many a charge that put Alabama in front after a strenuous tussle. His fighting courage was the deciding factor in most of these games." He was drafted in the seventh round of the 1938 NFL Draft.

Monsky was inducted into the Alabama Sports Hall of Fame in 1979.

After his football career ended, Monsky established a real estate business in Birmingham, Alabama. He died in New York City in 1981.

== See also ==
- 1937 College Football All-America Team
