= 1937 Mississippi State Maroons football team =

American college football season

1937 Mississippi State Maroons football
- Conference: Southeastern Conference
- Record: 5–4–1 (3–2 SEC)
- Head coach: Ralph Sasse (3rd season)
- Home stadium: Scott Field

1937 Southeastern Conference football standings
	Conf.					Overall
Team		W		L			W		L
No. 4 Alabama $	6	–	0	–	0	9	–	1	–	0
No. 8 LSU	5	–	1	–	0	9	–	2	–	0
Auburn	4	–	1	–	2	6	–	2	–	3
Vanderbilt	4	–	2	–	0	7	–	2	–	0
Mississippi State	3	–	2	–	0	5	–	4	–	1
Georgia Tech	3	–	2	–	1	6	–	3	–	1
Tennessee	4	–	3	–	0	6	–	3	–	1
Florida	3	–	4	–	0	4	–	7	–	0
Tulane	2	–	3	–	1	5	–	4	–	1
Georgia	1	–	2	–	2	6	–	3	–	2
Ole Miss	0	–	4	–	0	4	–	5	–	1
Kentucky	0	–	5	–	0	4	–	6	–	0
Sewanee	0	–	6	–	0	2	–	7	–	0
$ – Conference champion

The 1937 Mississippi State Maroons football team represented Mississippi State College during the 1937 college football season. At the end of the season, popular head coach Ralph Sasse shocked students and fans by resigning after a nervous breakdown. Sasse finished 20–10–2 in his three seasons at Mississippi State.

== Schedule ==
Date	Opponent	Site	Result	Attendance	Source
September 25	Delta State*	Scott Field; Starkville, MS	W 39–0		
October 2	Howard (AL)*	Scott Field; Starkville, MS	W 38–0	4,000	
October 9	vs. Texas A&M*	Lion Stadium; Tyler, TX	L 0–14	16,000	
October 16	at Auburn	Legion Field; Birmingham, AL	L 7–33	15,000	
October 23	Florida	Scott Field; Starkville, MS	W 14–13	7,500	
October 30	at Centenary*	State Fair Stadium; Shreveport, LA	T 0–0	10,000	
November 6	at No. 18 LSU	Tiger Stadium; Baton Rouge, LA (rivalry)	L 0–41	20,000	
November 13	Sewanee	Scott Field; Starkville, MS	W 12–0	6,000	
November 25	at Ole Miss	Hemingway Stadium; Oxford, MS (Egg Bowl)	W 9–7	14,000	
December 4	Duquesne*	Scott Field; Starkville, MS	L 0–9	6,000	
*Non-conference game; Rankings from AP Poll released prior to the game
