= 1937 Sewanee Tigers football team =

American college football season

1937 Sewanee Tigers football
- Conference: Southeastern Conference
- Record: 2–7 (0–6 SEC)
- Head coach: Harry E. Clark (7th season)
- Home stadium: Hardee Field

1937 Southeastern Conference football standings
	Conf.					Overall
Team		W		L			W		L
No. 4 Alabama $	6	–	0	–	0	9	–	1	–	0
No. 8 LSU	5	–	1	–	0	9	–	2	–	0
Auburn	4	–	1	–	2	6	–	2	–	3
Vanderbilt	4	–	2	–	0	7	–	2	–	0
Mississippi State	3	–	2	–	0	5	–	4	–	1
Georgia Tech	3	–	2	–	1	6	–	3	–	1
Tennessee	4	–	3	–	0	6	–	3	–	1
Florida	3	–	4	–	0	4	–	7	–	0
Tulane	2	–	3	–	1	5	–	4	–	1
Georgia	1	–	2	–	2	6	–	3	–	2
Ole Miss	0	–	4	–	0	4	–	5	–	1
Kentucky	0	–	5	–	0	4	–	6	–	0
Sewanee	0	–	6	–	0	2	–	7	–	0
$ – Conference champion

The 1937 Sewanee Tigers football team was an American football team that represented Sewanee: The University of the South as a member of the Southeastern Conference during the 1937 college football season. In their seventh season under head coach Harry E. Clark, Sewanee compiled a 2–7 record.

== Schedule ==
Date	Opponent	Site	Result	Attendance	Source
September 25	Hiwassee*	Hardee Field; Sewanee, TN	W 40–0		
October 2	at Alabama	Legion Field; Birmingham, AL	L 0–65	6,000	
October 8	Tennessee Wesleyan*	Hardee Field; Sewanee, TN	W 25–0		
October 16	at Florida	Florida Field; Gainesville, FL	L 0–21	5,000	
October 23	at Tennessee	Shields–Watkins Field; Knoxville, TN	L 0–32	4,000	
October 30	Tennessee Tech*	Hardee Field; Sewanee, TN	L 6–9		
November 6	at Vanderbilt	Dudley Field; Nashville, TN (rivalry)	L 0–41	6,500	
November 13	at Mississippi State	Scott Field; Starkville, MS	L 0–12	6,000	
November 20	at Tulane	Tulane Stadium; New Orleans, LA	L 7–33	10,000	
*Non-conference game
