= Butch Avinger =

American football player (1928–2008)

No. 91, 34
- Positions: Fullback, punter

Personal information
- Born: December 15, 1928; Beatrice, Alabama, U.S.
- Died: August 20, 2008 (aged 79); Birmingham, Alabama, U.S.
- Listed height: 6 ft 1 in (1.85 m)
- Listed weight: 215 lb (98 kg)

Career information
- High school: Sidney Lanier (Montgomery, Alabama)
- College: Alabama
- NFL draft: 1951: 1st round, 9th overall pick

Career history

Playing
- Pittsburgh Steelers (1951)*; Saskatchewan Roughriders (1952); New York Giants (1953)
- * Offseason or practice squad member only

Coaching
- Alabama (1954) Assistant freshmen coach; Alabama (1955) Backfield coach (Note: Coached the backfield alongside Happy Campbell and Joe Kilgrow.)

Awards and highlights
- WIFU All-Star (1952); 2× Jacobs Blocking Trophy (1949, 1950)

Career NFL statistics
- Punts: 42
- Punt yards: 1,597
- Longest punt: 69
- Stats at Pro Football Reference

Clarence Edmund "Butch" Avinger (December 15, 1928 – August 20, 2008) was an American professional football player and coach. He played college football for Alabama as a fullback and punter and professionally for the Pittsburgh Steelers and New York Giants of the National Football League (NFL) and the Saskatchewan Roughriders of the Canadian Football League (CFL). He also coached for Alabama.

Avinger was drafted in the first round with the ninth overall pick in the 1951 NFL draft to the Pittsburgh Steelers. He only saw action in 1953 when he played for the New York Giants.

After Avinger's playing career was over, he was hired as the assistant freshmen coach for his alma mater, Alabama. The following year, alongside Happy Campbell and Joe Kilgrow, Avinger assisted with the offensive backfield. After two seasons, he resigned to work for Allis-Chalmers in Gadsden, Alabama.
