= 1937 Ole Miss Rebels football team =

American college football season

1937 Ole Miss Rebels football
- Conference: Southeastern Conference
- Record: 4–5–1 (0–4 SEC)
- Head coach: Ed Walker (8th season)
- Home stadium: Hemingway Stadium

1937 Southeastern Conference football standings
	Conf.					Overall
Team		W		L			W		L
No. 4 Alabama $	6	–	0	–	0	9	–	1	–	0
No. 8 LSU	5	–	1	–	0	9	–	2	–	0
Auburn	4	–	1	–	2	6	–	2	–	3
Vanderbilt	4	–	2	–	0	7	–	2	–	0
Mississippi State	3	–	2	–	0	5	–	4	–	1
Georgia Tech	3	–	2	–	1	6	–	3	–	1
Tennessee	4	–	3	–	0	6	–	3	–	1
Florida	3	–	4	–	0	4	–	7	–	0
Tulane	2	–	3	–	1	5	–	4	–	1
Georgia	1	–	2	–	2	6	–	3	–	2
Ole Miss	0	–	4	–	0	4	–	5	–	1
Kentucky	0	–	5	–	0	4	–	6	–	0
Sewanee	0	–	6	–	0	2	–	7	–	0
$ – Conference champion

The 1937 Ole Miss Rebels football team was an American football team that represented the University of Mississippi in the Southeastern Conference during the 1937 college football season. In its eighth season under head coach Ed Walker, the team compiled a 4–5–1 record (0–4 against conference opponents) and outscored opponents by a total of 127 to 106. The team played its home games at Hemingway Stadium in Oxford, Mississippi.

== Schedule ==
Date	Opponent	Site	Result	Attendance	Source
September 25	Louisiana Tech*	Hemingway Stadium; Oxford, MS	W 13–0		
October 1	at Temple*	Temple Stadium; Philadelphia, PA	T 0–0	15,000	
October 9	Saint Louis*	Hemingway Stadium; Oxford, MS	W 21–0	4,500	
October 16	at LSU	Tiger Stadium; Baton Rouge, LA (rivalry)	L 0–13	25,000	
October 23	Ouachita Baptist*	Hemingway Stadium; Oxford, MS	W 46–0	2,500	
October 30	at Tulane	Tulane Stadium; New Orleans, LA (rivalry)	L 7–14	19,000	
November 5	at George Washington*	Griffith Stadium; Washington, DC	W 27–6	11,800	
November 13	vs. No. 20 Arkansas*	Crump Stadium; Memphis, TN (rivalry)	L 6–32	15,000	
November 25	Mississippi State	Hemingway Stadium; Oxford, MS (Egg Bowl)	L 7–9	14,000	
December 4	vs. Tennessee	Crump Stadium; Memphis, TN (rivalry)	L 0–32	10,000	
*Non-conference game; Rankings from AP Poll released prior to the game
