= 1937 Vanderbilt Commodores football team =

American college football season

1937 Vanderbilt Commodores football
- Conference: Southeastern Conference
- Record: 7–2 (4–2 SEC)
- Head coach: Ray Morrison (4th season)
- Captain: Carl Hinkle
- Home stadium: Dudley Field

1937 Southeastern Conference football standings
	Conf.					Overall
Team		W		L			W		L
No. 4 Alabama $	6	–	0	–	0	9	–	1	–	0
No. 8 LSU	5	–	1	–	0	9	–	2	–	0
Auburn	4	–	1	–	2	6	–	2	–	3
Vanderbilt	4	–	2	–	0	7	–	2	–	0
Mississippi State	3	–	2	–	0	5	–	4	–	1
Georgia Tech	3	–	2	–	1	6	–	3	–	1
Tennessee	4	–	3	–	0	6	–	3	–	1
Florida	3	–	4	–	0	4	–	7	–	0
Tulane	2	–	3	–	1	5	–	4	–	1
Georgia	1	–	2	–	2	6	–	3	–	2
Ole Miss	0	–	4	–	0	4	–	5	–	1
Kentucky	0	–	5	–	0	4	–	6	–	0
Sewanee	0	–	6	–	0	2	–	7	–	0
$ – Conference champion

The 1937 Vanderbilt Commodores football team represented Vanderbilt University during the 1937 college football season. The Commodores were led by Ray Morrison, who served in the third season of his second stint, and fourth overall, as head coach. Vanderbilt went 7–2 with losses to Georgia Tech and Alabama. Members of the Southeastern Conference, the Commodores went 4–2 in conference play. They played their five home games at Dudley Field in Nashville, Tennessee. A hidden ball trick helped Vanderbilt defeat LSU in its first-ever victory over a ranked opponent.

== Schedule ==
Date	Opponent	Rank	Site	Result	Attendance	Source
September 25	Kentucky		Dudley Field; Nashville, TN (rivalry)	W 12–0	5,000	
October 2	Chicago*		Dudley Field; Nashville, TN	W 18–0	5,000	
October 9	at Southwestern (TN)*		Crump Stadium; Memphis, TN	W 17–6	10,000	
October 16	at SMU*		Cotton Bowl; Dallas, TX	W 6–0	7,000	
October 23	No. 6 LSU	No. 20	Dudley Field; Nashville, TN	W 7–6	15,000	
October 30	at Georgia Tech	No. 7	Grant Field; Atlanta, GA (rivalry)	L 0–14	20,000	
November 6	Sewanee^{†}		Dudley Field; Nashville, TN (rivalry)	W 41–0	6,500	
November 13	at Tennessee		Shields–Watkins Field; Knoxville, TN (rivalry)	W 13–7	23,000	
November 25	No. 4 Alabama	No. 12	Dudley Field; Nashville, TN	L 7–9	22,000	
*Non-conference game; ^{†}Homecoming; Rankings from AP Poll released prior to the game
