= 1937 All-SEC football team =

American college football all-star team

The 1937 All-SEC football team consists of American football players selected to the All-Southeastern Conference (SEC) chosen by various selectors for the 1937 college football season. Alabama won the conference.

== All-SEC selections ==
=== Ends ===
- Bill Jordan, Georgia Tech (AP-1, UP-1)
- Tut Warren, Alabama (AP-1, UP-2)
- Perron Shoemaker, Alabama (AP-2, UP-1)
- Ralph Wenzel, Tulane (AP-2)
- Bob Kincade, Ole Miss (UP-2)
- Bowden Wyatt, Tennessee (College Football Hall of Fame) (AP-3)
- Ken Kavanaugh, LSU (College Football Hall of Fame) (AP-3)

=== Tackles ===
- Frank Kinard, Ole Miss (College Football Hall of Fame) (AP-1, UP-1)
- Eddie Gatto, LSU (AP-1, UP-2)
- Bo Russell, Auburn (AP-2, UP-1)
- Jim Ryba, Alabama (AP-3, UP-2)
- Baby Ray, Vanderbilt (AP-2)
- Ben Friend, LSU (AP-3)

=== Guards ===
- Leroy Monsky, Alabama (AP-1, UP-1)
- Ralph Sivell, Auburn (AP-1, UP-1)
- Ed Merlin, Vanderbilt (AP-2, UP-2)
- Ed Sydnor, Kentucky (AP-2)
- Norman Buckner, Tulane (UP-2)
- Norman Hall, Tulane (AP-3)
- Elijah Tinsley, Georgia (AP-3)

=== Centers ===
- Carl Hinkle, Vanderbilt (College Football Hall of Fame) (AP-1, UP-1)
- Quinton Lumpkin, Georgia (AP-2, UP-2)
- Jack Chivington, Georgia Tech (AP-3)

=== Quarterbacks ===
- Fletcher Sims, Georgia Tech (AP-1, UP-1)
- George Cafego, Tennessee (College Football Hall of Fame) (AP-2)
- Young Bussey, LSU (UP-2)
- Lunny Hollins, Vanderbilt (AP-3)

=== Halfbacks ===
- Joe Kilgrow, Alabama (AP-1, UP-1)
- Walter Mayberry, Florida (AP-1, UP-1)
- Charles Rohm, LSU (AP-2)
- Bob Davis, Kentucky (AP-2, UP-2)
- Bert Marshall, Vanderbilt (UP-2)
- Jimmy Fenton, Auburn (AP-3)
- Marlon "Dutch" Konemann, Georgia Tech (AP-3)

=== Fullbacks ===
- Bill Hartman, Georgia (College Football Hall of Fame) (AP-1)
- Jeff Milner, LSU (UP-1)
- Charlie Holm, Alabama (AP-2, UP-2)
- Guy Milner, LSU (AP-3)

== Key ==
AP = Associated Press.

UP = United Press

Bold = Consensus first-team selection by both AP and UP

== See also ==
- 1937 College Football All-America Team
