= 1937 Florida Gators football team =

American college football season

1937 Florida Gators football
- Conference: Southeastern Conference
- Record: 4–7 (3–4 SEC)
- Head coach: Josh Cody (2nd season)
- Captain: Walter Mayberry
- Home stadium: Florida Field

Uniform
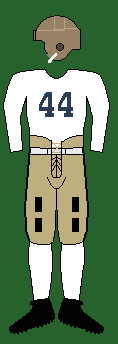

1937 Southeastern Conference football standings
	Conf.					Overall
Team		W		L			W		L
No. 4 Alabama $	6	–	0	–	0	9	–	1	–	0
No. 8 LSU	5	–	1	–	0	9	–	2	–	0
Auburn	4	–	1	–	2	6	–	2	–	3
Vanderbilt	4	–	2	–	0	7	–	2	–	0
Mississippi State	3	–	2	–	0	5	–	4	–	1
Georgia Tech	3	–	2	–	1	6	–	3	–	1
Tennessee	4	–	3	–	0	6	–	3	–	1
Florida	3	–	4	–	0	4	–	7	–	0
Tulane	2	–	3	–	1	5	–	4	–	1
Georgia	1	–	2	–	2	6	–	3	–	2
Ole Miss	0	–	4	–	0	4	–	5	–	1
Kentucky	0	–	5	–	0	4	–	6	–	0
Sewanee	0	–	6	–	0	2	–	7	–	0
$ – Conference champion

The 1937 Florida Gators football team represented the University of Florida during the 1937 college football season. The season was the second for Josh Cody as the head coach of the Florida Gators football team. The highlight of the season was the Gators' only 1930s win over the Georgia (6–0) in Jacksonville, Florida, but the season was mostly remembered for its disappointments—three one-point losses to Temple (7–6), Mississippi State (14–13), and Clemson (10–9). Cody's 1937 Florida Gators finished 4–7 overall and 3–4 in the Southeastern Conference (SEC), placing eighth of thirteen SEC teams in the conference standings.

== Schedule ==
Date	Opponent	Site	Result	Attendance	Source
September 25	at LSU	Tiger Stadium; Baton Rouge, LA (rivalry)	L 0–19	15,000	
October 2	Stetson*	Florida Field; Gainesville, FL	W 18–0	4,000	
October 9	at Temple*	Beury Stadium; Philadelphia, PA	L 6–7	10,000	
October 16	Sewanee	Florida Field; Gainesville, FL	W 21–0	5,000	
October 23	at Mississippi State	Scott Field; Starkville, MS	L 13–14	7,500	
October 30	at Maryland*	Byrd Stadium; College Park, MD	L 7–13	10,000	
November 6	vs. Georgia	Fairfield Stadium; Jacksonville, FL (rivalry)	W 6–0	20,000	
November 13	Clemson*	Florida Field; Gainesville, FL	L 9–10	6,000	
November 20	Georgia Tech^{†}	Florida Field; Gainesville, FL	L 0–12	16,000	
November 27	vs. Auburn	Fairfield Stadium; Jacksonville, FL (rivalry)	L 0–14		
December 4	Kentucky	Florida Field; Gainesville, FL (rivalry)	W 6–0		
*Non-conference game; ^{†}Homecoming

== Game summaries ==
=== Temple ===
Mayberry starred in a close loss to coach Pop Warner's Temple Owls, keeping the 10,000 spectators "in an uproar for nearly three periods."

=== Georgia ===
The 1937 team defeated the Georgia Bulldogs in the two teams' annual rivalry game for the first time in eight years.

== Postseason ==
Tiger Mayberry ranked second in the country with 818 rushing yards; only Byron White exceeded Mayberry's rushing total that year.

Mayberry also intercepted six passes when the Gators' opponents only threw 57 balls, and was a first-team All-SEC selection by the conference coaches and sportswriters on behalf of the Associated Press.
