= Bruiser Kinard =

American football player, coach, and athletic administrator (1905–1982)

- Kinard in 1940

No. 25, 44
- Position: Tackle

Personal information
- Born: October 23, 1914; Pelahatchie, Mississippi, U.S.
- Died: September 7, 1985 (aged 70); Jackson, Mississippi, U.S.
- Listed height: 6 ft 1 in (1.85 m)
- Listed weight: 216 lb (98 kg)

Career information
- High school: Central (Jackson)
- College: Ole Miss (1934-1937)
- NFL draft: 1938: 3rd round, 18th overall pick

Career history

Playing
- Brooklyn Dodgers / Tigers (1938–1944); Fleet City (1945); New York Yankees (1946–1947)

Coaching
- New York Yankees (1947) Assistant coach; Ole Miss (1948–1970) Line coach

Operations
- Ole Miss (1971–1973) Athletic director

Awards and highlights
- 6× First-team All-Pro (1938, 1940–1944); 5× NFL All-Star (1938–1942); First-team All-AAFC (1946); 2× First-team All-American (1936, 1937); 2× First-team All-SEC (1936, 1937)

Career NFL/AAFC statistics
- Games played: 101
- Games started: 89
- Stats at Pro Football Reference
- Pro Football Hall of Fame
- College Football Hall of Fame

Frank Manning "Bruiser" Kinard Sr. (October 23, 1914 – September 7, 1985) was an American football tackle and coach and university athletic administrator. He was inducted into the College Football Hall of Fame as a charter member in 1951 and into the Pro Football Hall of Fame in 1971.

A native of Pelahatchie, Mississippi, he played college football for Ole Miss from 1935 to 1937. He was the first player from any Mississippi school to receive first-team All-American honors, receiving those honors in both 1936 and 1937.

Kinard was drafted by the Brooklyn Dodgers in the third round of the 1938 NFL draft and played seven years in the National Football League (NFL) for the Dodgers/Tigers from 1938 to 1944. He was selected as a first-team All-Pro in six of his seven years in the NFL (1938, 1940–1944). After missing the 1945 NFL season due to wartime service in the United States Navy, he played two years in the All-America Football Conference (AAFC) for the New York Yankees from 1946 to 1947 and was selected as a first-team All-AAFC player in 1946.

Kinard also served as an assistant coach for New York Yankees in 1947 and for the Ole Miss football program from 1948 to 1970, as Ole Miss' athletic director from 1971 to 1973, and as its assistant dean of student personnel from 1974 until 1978.

== Early life ==
Kinard was born in Pelahatchie, Mississippi, in 1914. His father Major Henry Kinard and mother Pearl (Wooley) Kinard were both Mississippi natives. His father worked variously as a farmer, a laborer, and the proprietor of a lunch room in Utica, Mississippi.

Kinard began high school as a freshman at Rolling Fork High School and then played his sophomore through senior years at Central High School in Jackson, Mississippi. The sheriff of Hinds County reportedly recruited Kinard, already an excellent football player, to move to Jackson and offered his father a job as a jailer to facilitate the move. Kinard acquired the nickname "Bruiser" after tackling one of his teammates during a practice scrimmage at Central High School. He was the president of the senior class, ranked in the top third of his class, and graduated in 1933.

Kinard had four brothers and two sisters. Two of his younger brothers, George Kinard and Billy Kinard, also played professional football.

== College career ==
Kinard attended the University of Mississippi (Ole Miss), lettered for the Ole Miss Rebels from 1935 to 1937 and served as co-captain of the 1937 Ole Miss squad. During his three years at Ole Miss, Kinard appeared in all 34 games and averaged 55 minutes per game. During one season, he played all 60 minutes in nine games.

With Kinard playing tackle, the 1936 Ole Miss team compiled a 9–3 record and played in the school's first bowl game, a 20–19 loss to Catholic University in the 1936 Orange Bowl. During his junior and senior seasons, Ole Miss went 9–10–3, but Kinard nevertheless received recognition as follows:

- In 1936, Kinard was selected by the All-America Board and International News Service (INS) as a first-team tackle on the 1936 College Football All-America Team. He was the first player from Ole Miss (indeed, from any school in Mississippi) to receive first-team All-American honors. He was also selected by both the Associated Press (AP) and United Press (UP) as a first-team player on the 1936 All-SEC football team.
- In 1937, Kinard was selected by the UP, INS, Newspaper Enterprise Association, Collyer's Eye, and The Sporting News as a first-team All-American. He was also again a consensus pick by the AP and UP for the All-SEC team.
- Kinard also played in the 1938 Chicago College All-Star Game, the first Ole Miss player to receive that honor.

Kinard was an above-average student at Ole Miss, president of the sophomore class, and a member of Omicron Delta Kappa. He graduated from Ole Miss in 1938 with a Bachelor of Science degree in commerce.

== Professional and military career ==
=== Brooklyn Dodgers/Tigers ===
Kinard was selected by the Brooklyn Dodgers in the third round (18th overall pick) of the 1938 NFL draft. He made $1,974 as a rookie, a sum that Kinard recalled "was a lot of money back then." Even in 1938, Kinard was small for a lineman at 210 pounds, but he noted: "I had enough ability to offset my size. And my speed was a lot better than any of the linemen." He was a two-way player known for making "crushing blocks" on offense and as a "smothering, dominant tackler" who made "stops all over the field" on defense.

Joe Stydahar, a fellow Pro Football Hall of Fame inductee who played against Kinard, recalled: "The Brooklyn team used to have plays designed just for the blocking of Kinard. They'd get Frank out there against a defender and he'd just mow them down."

Kinard spent seven seasons with the Dodgers from 1938 to 1944 and developed a reputation as one of the toughest and most durable players in the NFL. According to his Pro Football Hall of Fame biography, he "rarely needed a rest and near-60-minute performances were the rule, rather than the exception." He appeared as a starter at tackle in every game for the Dodgers in 1938, 1939, 1941, 1942, 1943, and 1944. During his seven years in the NFL, he missed only two games, those coming in the 1940 season after an opposing player stepped on his hand and gangrene threatened amputation of the hand. Kinard was also a regular on the NFL's annual All-Pro teams receiving first-team recognition from one or more selectors in six of his seven years in the NFL: in 1938 from the Pro Football Writers Association (PFWA); in 1940 from the NFL, Associated Press (AP), United Press (UP), and International News Service (INS); in 1941 from the NFL and UP; in 1942 from the INS; and in 1943 and 1944 from the AP. He received second-team All-Pro honors in 1939 from the NFL, UP, and PFWA.

Although used principally as a tackle, Kinard scored 42 points for the Yankees, scoring touchdowns on receptions in 1943 and a fumble recovery in 1941, kicking a field goal in 1943, and converting 27 of 30 extra-point kicks.

With Jock Sutherland as head coach, the Dodgers ranked among the top teams in the NFL, finishing second in the NFL East with records of 8–3 in 1940 and 7–4 in 1941. Sutherland left the team in 1942, and the club dropped to 2–8 in 1943 and 0–10 in 1944.

=== Navy/Fleet City ===
After the Dodgers winless 1944 season, Kinard enlisted in the United States Navy in April 1945. He served until March 1946. Kinard and his brother, George, played at tackle and guard, respectively, for the Fleet City Bluejackets football team based at Camp Shoemaker in Dublin, California. Kinard was named to the All-Service football team selected by West Coast sports writers in December 1945.

=== New York Yankees ===
In January 1946, Dan Topping, owner of the New York Yankees of the newly-formed All-America Football Conference (AAFC), signed the Kinard brothers and four others from the Navy's Fleet City football team. Bruiser Kinard started all 14 games for Yankees in 1946, helping the team to a 10–3–1 record, good for first place in the AAFC's East Division. The team then lost in the AAFC championship game to the 1946 Cleveland Browns. At the end of the 1946 season, Kinard was selected by the AP, UP, and AAFC as a first-team All-AAFC player.

Kinard returned to the Yankees in 1947 and appeared in all 14 games, but in only three as a starter. Kinard was also an assistant coach for the Yankees during the 1947 season. He announced his retirement as a player in January 1948 at age 33.

=== Honors and awards ===
Kinard received numerous honors and awards for his accomplishments as a football player, notably including induction into the two major football halls of fame. He was inducted as a charter member into the College Football Hall of Fame in 1951, and in 1971 he was inducted into the Pro Football Hall of Fame. Other significant awards and honors include:

- In 1949, he was named to the All-America Board's all-time football team, receiving more votes than any other tackle.
- In 1950, the Mississippian, the Ole Miss campus newspaper selected Kinard as the greatest Ole Miss athlete of all time.
- In 1953, he was honored by Ole Miss with a "Bruiser Kinard Day" in celebration of Kinard's induction into the College Football Hall of Fame. The Governor of Mississippi also declared a "Frank M. (Bruiser) Kinard Day" throughout the State of Mississippi.
- In 1955, he was inducted into the Helms Athletic Foundation's Helms College Football Hall of Fame.
- In 1961, he was inducted as one of four charter members into the Mississippi Sports Hall of Fame (along with Edwin Hale, Dudy Noble, and Stanley L. Robinson).
- In 1969, as part of football's centennial celebration, the Football Writers Association of America selected an all-time All-America team covering the sport's modern era from 1920 to 1969. Kinard was selected at the tackle position.
- In 1971, inducted into the Pro Football Hall of Fame
- In 1986, Ole Miss inducted Kinard posthumously into the Ole Miss Athletic Hall of Fame and also named its men's athletic dormitory as Kinard Hall in his honor.
- In 1993, as part of Ole Miss' celebration of its first 100 years of football, the school named its Ole Miss Team of the Century. Kinard was included as a defensive lineman.
- In 1999, he was one of 83 college football players named to the Walter Camp Football Foundation's All-Century team.

== Coaching and administrative career ==
In February 1948, Kinard was hired as the line coach at Ole Miss under Johnny Vaught. He remained on Vaught's staff for 21 years. During the 12-year span from 1952 to 1963, Ole Miss won six SEC championships and was ranked in the top 11 of the final AP Poll 10 times, including No. 2 finishes in 1959 and 1960 and a No. 3 finish in 1962. Kinard had offers to become a head coach in the NFL for the Boston Patriots and New York Giants, but opted to stay at Ole Miss.

Kinard also served as acting head coach at Ole Miss for the last half of the 1970 season after Vaught suffered a heart attack on October 20. In six games under Kinard, the 1970 Rebels won three games and lost three, including losses to rivals Mississippi State and LSU and to Auburn in the 1971 Gator Bowl. However, Ole Miss credits the entire 1970 season to Vaught.

In January 1971, Ole Miss hired Kinard as its athletic director and his younger brother Billy Kinard as its head football coach. In 1971, the Kinards led the 1971 Ole Miss team to a 10–2 record and a No. 15 ranking in the final AP Poll. However, the team's fortunes declined in 1972 with a 5–5 record. In September 1973, after Ole Miss lost two of the first three games, the university fired Billy Kinard as head coach and relieved Bruiser of his duties as athletic director, with Vaught assuming both posts.

Bruiser remained employed by Ole Miss and was appointed assistant dean of student personnel in June 1974. He held that position until he retired in 1978.

== Family and later years ==
Kinard married Mildred Frances "Midge" Kirk (1915–2006) in 1933 while they were seniors in high school. They had two sons, Frank Jr. and John.

In 1982, Kinard and his wife moved from Oxford, Mississippi, to Jackson, Mississippi, where they lived until Kinard's death. Kinard suffered from Alzheimer's disease that eventually resulted in the near total loss of his memory. He died in 1985 at age 70 at the Veterans Administration Medical Center in Jackson. He was buried at Lakewood Memorial Park in Jackson.
