= 1937 Alabama Crimson Tide football team =

American college football season

1937 Alabama Crimson Tide football

SEC champion

Rose Bowl, L 0–13 vs. California
- Conference: Southeastern Conference

Ranking
- AP: No. 4
- Record: 9–1 (6–0 SEC)
- Head coach: Frank Thomas (7th season)
- Captain: Leroy Monsky
- Home stadium: Denny Stadium; Legion Field

1937 Southeastern Conference football standings
	Conf.					Overall
Team		W		L			W		L
No. 4 Alabama $	6	–	0	–	0	9	–	1	–	0
No. 8 LSU	5	–	1	–	0	9	–	2	–	0
Auburn	4	–	1	–	2	6	–	2	–	3
Vanderbilt	4	–	2	–	0	7	–	2	–	0
Mississippi State	3	–	2	–	0	5	–	4	–	1
Georgia Tech	3	–	2	–	1	6	–	3	–	1
Tennessee	4	–	3	–	0	6	–	3	–	1
Florida	3	–	4	–	0	4	–	7	–	0
Tulane	2	–	3	–	1	5	–	4	–	1
Georgia	1	–	2	–	2	6	–	3	–	2
Ole Miss	0	–	4	–	0	4	–	5	–	1
Kentucky	0	–	5	–	0	4	–	6	–	0
Sewanee	0	–	6	–	0	2	–	7	–	0
$ – Conference champion

The 1937 Alabama Crimson Tide football team (variously "Alabama", "UA" or "Bama") represented the University of Alabama in the 1937 college football season. It was the Crimson Tide's 44th overall and 5th season as a member of the Southeastern Conference (SEC). The team was led by head coach Frank Thomas, in his seventh year, and played their home games at Denny Stadium in Tuscaloosa and Legion Field in Birmingham, Alabama. They finished the season with a record of nine wins and one loss (9–1 overall, 6–0 in the SEC), as SEC champions and with a loss against California in the 1938 Rose Bowl.

The Crimson Tide opened the season with three consecutive shutouts against Howard, Sewanee and South Carolina. In their fourth game, Alabama surrendered their first points of the season on defense in their 14–7 victory over Tennessee. They then shutout their next two opponents, George Washington and Kentucky prior to their game at Tulane. Against the Green Wave, the Crimson Tide won 9–6 on a game-winning fourth-quarter field goal by Hayward Sanford. After their sixth shutout of the season against Georgia Tech, Alabama won their second game of the season on a fourth quarter Sanford field goal against Vanderbilt, and clinched the SEC championship with the win. With their undefeated regular season, Alabama accepted an invitation to play in the 1938 Rose Bowl where they lost 13–0 to California.

== Schedule ==
Date	Opponent	Rank	Site	Result	Attendance	Source
September 25	Howard (AL)*		Denny Stadium; Tuscaloosa, AL	W 41–0	7,500	
October 2	Sewanee		Legion Field; Birmingham, AL	W 65–0	7,000	
October 9	South Carolina*		Denny Stadium; Tuscaloosa, AL	W 20–0	9,000	
October 16	at Tennessee		Shields-Watkins Field; Knoxville, TN (rivalry)	W 14–7	25,000	
October 23	at George Washington*	No. 2	Griffith Stadium; Washington, DC	W 19–0	24,666	
October 30	Kentucky^{†}	No. 3	Denny Stadium; Tuscaloosa, AL	W 41–0	13,000	
November 6	at No. 19 Tulane	No. 2	Tulane Stadium; New Orleans, LA	W 9–6	30,000	
November 13	Georgia Tech	No. 3	Legion Field; Birmingham, AL (rivalry)	W 7–0	26,000	
November 25	at No. 12 Vanderbilt	No. 4	Dudley Field; Nashville, TN	W 9–7	22,000	
January 1, 1938	vs. No. 2 California*	No. 4	Rose Bowl; Pasadena, CA (Rose Bowl)	L 0–13	89,650	
*Non-conference game; ^{†}Homecoming; Rankings from AP Poll released prior to the game

== Before the season ==
After the 1936 season, the first expansion of Denny Stadium was undertaken. The stadium originally opened for the 1929 season, and the concrete stands had a seating capacity of 12,000. The 1937 expansion included the construction of a 6,000 seat eastern addition that was utilized primarily by students. Its construction was financed with a combination of funding from both the university ($140,000) and a grant from the Public Works Administration ($90,000). Designed after the Yale Bowl, at the time of this expansion the school envisioned a build-out of Denny Stadium at a capacity of 66,000.

== Game summaries ==
=== Howard (AL) ===
Team	1	2	3	4	Total
Howard	0	0	0	0	0
• Alabama	14	14	7	6	41

- Date: September 25
- Location: Denny Stadium
  Tuscaloosa, AL
- Game attendance: 7,500

To open the 1937 season, Alabama outgained Howard (now Samford University) in total yards 198 to 6, and defeated the Bulldogs 41–0 at Denny Stadium. The Crimson Tide scored a pair of touchdowns in each of the first two quarters to take a 28–0 halftime lead. First-quarter touchdowns were scored on a 21-yard Joe Kilgrow touchdown pass to George Zivich and on a Perron Shoemaker blocked punt returned 15-yards for the score. In the second, touchdowns were scored by Herschel Mosley on a 91-yard punt return and on a 10-yard Mosley to Bud Waites touchdown pass. The Crimson Tide then closed the game with a pair of second half touchdowns for the 41–0 victory. Charlie Holm scored on a four-yard run in the third and Alvin Davis scored on a 19-yard run in the fourth.

=== Sewanee ===
Team	1	2	3	4	Total
Sewanee	0	0	0	0	0
• Alabama	13	27	13	12	65

- Date: October 2
- Location: Legion Field
  Birmingham, AL
- Game attendance: 7,000

In the conference opener, Alabama defeated the Sewanee Tigers 65–0 at Legion Field in rainy conditions. In the game, Alabama outgained the Tigers 600 to 27 yards in total offense with both Charlie Holm and Joe Kilgrow each having gained over 100 yards rushing. The Crimson Tide also scored ten total touchdowns with Silas Beard, Kilgrow, Herschel Mosley and Billy Slemons each scoring two and both Holm and George Zivich each scoring one in the victory.

=== South Carolina ===
Team	1	2	3	4	Total
South Carolina	0	0	0	0	0
• Alabama	7	6	7	0	20

- Date: October 9
- Location: Denny Stadium
  Tuscaloosa, AL
- Game attendance: 9,000

Against the South Carolina Gamecocks of the Southern Conference Alabama won 20–0 at Denny Stadium in what was the first all-time meeting between the schools. Touchdowns were scored by Joe Kilgrow on a short run in the first, on a 33-yard Kilgrow pass to Silas Beard in the second and on a one-yard Hal Hughes run in the third.

=== Tennessee ===
Third Saturday in October

Team	1	2	3	4	Total
• Alabama	0	7	7	0	14
Tennessee	0	0	0	7	7

- Date: October 16
- Location: Shields-Watkins Field
  Knoxville, TN
- Game attendance: 25,000

In Knoxville, Alabama defeated rival Tennessee 14–7 at Shields-Watkins Field one year after their scoreless tie at Legion Field. The overflow crowd of 25,000 included Tennessee Governor Gordon Browning and Alabama Governor Frank M. Dixon. After a scoreless first quarter, the Crimson Tide took a 7–0 lead in the second quarter after a Carey Cox interception set up the scoring drive. The touchdown was scored by Vic Bradford on a two-yard quarterback sneak to complete a 60-yard drive. In the third, Alabama extended their lead to 14–0 after Hal Hughes scored on a one-yard quarterback sneak. The Volunteers responded in the fourth with their only points, a three-yard George Cafego touchdown pass to Edwin Duncan to complete an 85-yard drive. The Tennessee touchdown was the first points allowed by the Crimson Tide defense of the season.

=== George Washington ===
Team	1	2	3	4	Total
• #2 Alabama	0	13	6	0	19
George Washington	0	0	0	0	0

- Date: October 23
- Location: Griffith Stadium
  Washington, DC
- Game attendance: 24,666

As the entered their game against George Washington, Alabama was ranked No. 2 in the first AP Poll of the 1937 season. In the contest, the Crimson Tide defeated the Colonials 19–0 at Griffith Stadium. For the second week in a row, Alabama was held scoreless in the first quarter, however a pair of second-quarter touchdowns gave the Crimson Tide a 13–0 halftime lead. In the second, touchdowns were scored by Joe Kilgrow on a 35-yard pass to Perron Shoemaker and Kilgrow on a six-yard run. The final points of the game were scored by Charlie Holm in the third after he returned an interception 30-yards for a touchdown.

=== Kentucky ===
Team	1	2	3	4	Total
Kentucky	0	0	0	0	0
• #3 Alabama	6	21	7	7	41

- Date: October 30
- Location: Denny Stadium
  Tuscaloosa, AL
- Game attendance: 13,000

As Alabama entered their homecoming contest against Kentucky, they dropped one place to No. 3 in the weekly poll. In the game, the Crimson Tide defeated the Wildcats 41–0 before 13,000 at Denny Stadium. After Charlie Holm scored on a 27-yard touchdown run in the first, the Crimson Tide scored three second-quarter touchdowns for a 27–0 halftime lead. The second-quarter touchdowns were scored by Gene Blackwell on a six-yard run, Joe Kilgrow on a 20-yard run and on a ten-yard Herschel Mosley pass to Johnny Roberts. Alabama then closed the game with a pair one-yard touchdown runs in the second half for the 41–0 win. The first was scored by Billy Slemons in the third and the second by W. L. Waites in the fourth.

=== Tulane ===
Team	1	2	3	4	Total
• #2 Alabama	0	0	6	3	9
#19 Tulane	6	0	0	0	6

- Date: November 6
- Location: Tulane Stadium
  New Orleans, LA
- Game attendance: 30,000

After their victory over Kentucky, the Crimson Tide moved up one position and regained the No. 2 spot in the weekly poll. Tulane was ranked No. 19 in the poll after their victory over Ole Miss. In the contest, the Crimson Tide defeated the Green Wave 9–6 after they converted a game-winning field goal late in the fourth quarter. Tulane took a 6–0 lead in the first when John Andrews scored on a one-yard run three plays after William Kirchem blocked an Alabama punt to give the Greenies possession at the Tide's 18-yard line. Alabama did not score until early in the third when Vic Bradford completed an 87-yard drive with his one-yard touchdown run, and after a missed extra point the game was tied at six. With less than two minutes remaining in the fourth, Hayward Sanford kicked a 23-yard field goal to win the game.

=== Georgia Tech ===
Team	1	2	3	4	Total
Georgia Tech	0	0	0	0	0
• #3 Alabama	0	0	0	7	7

- Date: November 13
- Location: Legion Field
  Birmingham, AL
- Game attendance: 26,000

After their close victory over Tulane, the Crimson Tide dropped one position to the No. 3 spot in the weekly poll in spite of having more first-place voted than No. 2 California. In their game against Georgia Tech, the game remained scoreless before a fourth-quarter touchdown gave Alabama the 7–0 victory over the Yellow Jackets at Legion Field. In the fourth, Joe Kilgrow threw the game-winning two-yard touchdown pass to Erin Warren with only four minutes remaining in the game for the 7–0 win.

=== Vanderbilt ===
Team	1	2	3	4	Total
• #4 Alabama	0	6	0	3	9
#12 Vanderbilt	0	0	7	0	7

- Date: November 25
- Location: Dudley Field
  Nashville, TN
- Game attendance: 22,000

After their victory over Georgia Tech, Alabama had a bye week prior to their annual Thanksgiving Day game against Vanderbilt. Prior to their game, Alabama dropped to No. 4 and Vanderbilt moved up to No. 12 in the weekly AP Poll. In the game against the Commodores, Alabama won their second game of the season with a fourth quarter field goal in their 9–7 win at Dudley Field. After a scoreless first, the Crimson Tide took a 6–0 lead in the second quarter on a Joe Kilgrow touchdown pass to Erin Warren. The Commodores took a 7–6 lead in the third when Hardy Housman scored on a one-yard run and Joe Agee kicked the extra point. However, late in the fourth Hayward Sanford kicked the 27-yard game-winning field goal to give the Crimson Tide the 9–7 win. The victory clinched the SEC championship for the Crimson Tide.

=== California ===
1938 Rose Bowl

Team	1	2	3	4	Total
#4 Alabama	0	0	0	0	0
• #2 California	0	7	6	0	13

- Date: January 1, 1938
- Location: Rose Bowl
  Pasadena, CA
- Game attendance: 87,000

On November 30, Alabama accepted an invitation to play in the 1938 Rose Bowl against the California Golden Bears. In the game, the Crimson Tide were defeated in their only game of the season after their 13–0 shutout loss before 87,000 fans at Pasadena. Vic Bottari scored both touchdowns for the Golden Bears on runs of four-yards in the second and five-yards in the third. In the loss, the Crimson Tide turned the ball over eight times, on four fumbles and four interceptions. Alabama had two scoring opportunities end inside the California ten-yard line, one on a fumble at the one-yard line and another at the six-yard line. The loss was also Alabama's first in the Rose Bowl Game.

== After the season ==
=== Awards ===
After the season, Leroy Monsky was a consensus selection and both Joe Kilgrow and James Ryba were selected to various 1937 College Football All-America Teams.

=== NFL draft ===
Several players that were varsity lettermen from the 1937 squad were drafted into the National Football League (NFL) between the 1938 and 1940 drafts. These players included the following:

Year	Round	Overall	Player name	Position	NFL team
1938	2	13	Joe Kilgrow	Back	Brooklyn Dodgers
1938	7	53	Leroy Monsky	Guard	Brooklyn Dodgers
1939	3	23	Charley Holm	Back	Washington Redskins
1939	9	73	Lew Bostick	Guard	Cleveland Rams
1940	4	30	Bobby Wood	Tackle	Cleveland Rams
1940	5	34	Walt Merrill	Tackle	Brooklyn Dodgers
1940	11	93	Cary Cox	Center	Pittsburgh Steelers
1940	11	138	Hayward Sanford	End	Washington Redskins

== Personnel ==
=== Varsity letter winners ===
Player	Hometown	Position
Silas Beard	Guntersville, Alabama	Halfback
Gene Blackwell	Blytheville, Arkansas	End
Lewis Bostick	Birmingham, Alabama	Guard
Vic Bradford	Memphis, Tennessee	Quarterback
Henry Cochrane	Paducah, Kentucky	Quarterback
Carey Cox	Bainbridge, Georgia	Center
Alvin Davis	Green Forest, Arkansas	Fullback
Maurice Fletcher	Clarksdale, Mississippi	Quarterback
Jess Foshee	Clanton, Alabama	Guard
Grover Harkins	Gadsden, Alabama	Guard
Charlie Holm	Birmingham, Alabama	Halfback
Hal Hughes	Pine Bluff, Arkansas	Quarterback
Thomas Keller	Cullman, Alabama	End
Joe Kilgrow	Montgomery, Alabama	Halfback
Jack Machtolff	Sheffield, Alabama	Center
Walter Merrill	Andalusia, Alabama	Tackle
Leroy Monsky	Montgomery, Alabama	Guard
Herschel Mosley	Blytheville, Arkansas	Halfback
William Peters	Hammond, Indiana	Guard
Jake Redden	Vernon, Alabama	Guard
Johnny Roberts	Birmingham, Alabama	Fullback
Jim Ryba	Cicero, Illinois	Tackle
Hayward Sanford	Plainview, Arkansas	End
Perron Shoemaker	Birmingham, Alabama	End
Billy Slemons	Orlando, Florida	Halfback
Jim Tipton	Blytheville, Arkansas	Tackle
Erin Warren	Montgomery, Alabama	End
Bobby Wood	McComb, Mississippi	Tackle
George Zivich	East Chicago, Indiana	Halfback

=== Coaching staff ===
Name	Position	Seasons at Alabama	Alma mater
Frank Thomas	Head coach	7	Notre Dame (1923)
Bear Bryant	Assistant coach	2	Alabama (1935)
Paul Burnum	Assistant coach	8	Alabama (1922)
Tilden Campbell	Assistant coach	2	Alabama (1935)
Hank Crisp	Assistant coach	17	VPI (1920)
Harold Drew	Assistant coach	7	Bates (1916)
