= 1937 Tulane Green Wave football team =

American college football season

1937 Tulane Green Wave football
- Conference: Southeastern Conference
- Record: 5–4–1 (2–3–1 SEC)
- Head coach: Red Dawson (2nd season)
- Captains: Norman Buckner; Norman Hall
- Home stadium: Tulane Stadium

1937 Southeastern Conference football standings
	Conf.					Overall
Team		W		L			W		L
No. 4 Alabama $	6	–	0	–	0	9	–	1	–	0
No. 8 LSU	5	–	1	–	0	9	–	2	–	0
Auburn	4	–	1	–	2	6	–	2	–	3
Vanderbilt	4	–	2	–	0	7	–	2	–	0
Mississippi State	3	–	2	–	0	5	–	4	–	1
Georgia Tech	3	–	2	–	1	6	–	3	–	1
Tennessee	4	–	3	–	0	6	–	3	–	1
Florida	3	–	4	–	0	4	–	7	–	0
Tulane	2	–	3	–	1	5	–	4	–	1
Georgia	1	–	2	–	2	6	–	3	–	2
Ole Miss	0	–	4	–	0	4	–	5	–	1
Kentucky	0	–	5	–	0	4	–	6	–	0
Sewanee	0	–	6	–	0	2	–	7	–	0
$ – Conference champion

The 1937 Tulane Green Wave football team was an American football team that represented Tulane University as a member of the Southeastern Conference (SEC) during the 1937 college football season. In its second year under head coach Red Dawson, Tulane compiled a 5–4–1 record (2–3–1 in conference games), finished ninth in the SEC, and outscored opponents by a total of 164 to 69.

The Green Wave played its home games at Tulane Stadium in New Orleans.

== Schedule ==
Date	Opponent	Rank	Site	Result	Attendance	Source
September 25	Clemson*		Tulane Stadium; New Orleans, LA	W 7–0	15,000	
October 4	Auburn		Tulane Stadium; New Orleans, LA (rivalry)	T 0–0		
October 9	Mississippi College*		Tulane Stadium; New Orleans, LA	W 84–0	12,000	
October 16	vs. Colgate*		Roesch Memorial Stadium; Buffalo, NY	W 7–6	32,524	
October 23	at North Carolina*		Kenan Memorial Stadium; Chapel Hill, NC	L 0–13		
October 30	Ole Miss		Tulane Stadium; New Orleans, LA (rivalry)	W 14–7	19,000	
November 6	No. 2 Alabama	No. 19	Tulane Stadium; New Orleans, LA	L 6–9	31,000	
November 13	at Georgia		Sanford Stadium; Athens, GA	L 6–7	12,000	
November 20	Sewanee		Tulane Stadium; New Orleans, LA	W 33–7	10,000	
November 27	No. 10 LSU		Tulane Stadium; New Orleans, LA (Battle for the Rag)	L 7–20	40,000	
*Non-conference game; Rankings from AP Poll released prior to the game
