= Jack Meagher =

American athlete and coach (1894–1968)

Biographical details
- Born: July 5, 1894; Chicago, Illinois, U.S.
- Died: December 7, 1968 (aged 74); Miami, Florida, U.S.

Playing career

Football
- 1916: Notre Dame
- 1920: Chicago Tigers
- Position: End

Coaching career (HC unless noted)

Football
- 1921–1928: St. Edward's
- 1929–1933: Rice
- 1934–1942: Auburn
- 1944: Iowa Pre-Flight
- 1946: Miami Seahawks

Basketball
- 1921–1924: St. Edward's

Baseball
- 1922–1929: St. Edward's

Administrative career (AD unless noted)
- 1934–1942: Auburn

Head coaching record
- Overall: 21–7 (college basketball); 1–5 (AAFC)
- Bowls: 1–0–1

Accomplishments and honors

Awards
- Football; SEC Coach of the Year (1935)

John Francis Meagher (July 5, 1894 – December 7, 1968) was an American football player, coach of football, basketball, and baseball, and college athletics administrator.

Meagher played football for the University of Notre Dame in 1916, rising to a second-team end under then-assistant coach, Knute Rockne. He served with the United States Marines in France during World War I and played in four games with the Chicago Tigers in 1920, the first year of the National Football League (NFL).

Meagher embarked on a career in coaching in 1921 at St. Edward's University, where he served as head football coach from 1921 to 1928, compiling a record of 24–21–4, and as head basketball coach from 1921 to 1924. From 1929 to 1933, he coached football at Rice University, where he compiled a 26–26 record. From 1934 to 1942, he was the head football coach at Auburn University, where he compiled a 48–37–10 record. Shug Jordan was his assistant coach. During his nine seasons coaching the Auburn Tigers, they played in their first bowl game ever, the Bacardi Bowl. The game was held in Havana, Cuba. In 1935, Meagher was named the SEC Coach of the Year. He joined the Navy during World War II and served as a lieutenant commander in the United States Navy. Meagher also coached the Iowa Pre-Flight Seahawks football team in 1944 during World War II. In 1946, he coached the first six games of the season for the Miami Seahawks of the All-America Football Conference (AAFC), going 1–5.

Former players of Meagher at Auburn University were known as Meagher's Marauders because of their aggression on the football field, and most of the games they played were on the road. During Meagher's first 6 years at Auburn, his players played only 3 home games. Meagher was the driving force behind the building of Auburn's stadium. Auburn Stadium opened in 1939 and seated 7,500. Meagher's Marauders award a scholarship every year to an Auburn student during one of the fall games. In 2015, the Coach Jack Meagher Award (CJM) was awarded to Vincent "Bo" Jackson.

Meager died on December 7, 1968. He is buried at Hollywood Memorial Gardens East in Hollywood, Florida. Meagher was inducted into the St. Edward's University Athletics Hall of Fame in 1989.

== Head coaching record ==
=== College football ===
Year	Team	Overall	Conference	Standing	Bowl/playoffs	AP^{#}
St. Edward's Saints (Texas Intercollegiate Athletic Association) (1921–1926)
1921	St. Edward's					
1922	St. Edward's					
1923	St. Edward's					
1924	St. Edward's	6–2				
1925	St. Edward's	3–4–1	1–3–1	T–10th		
1926	St. Edward's	4–6	0–2	8th		
St. Edward's Saints (Texas Conference) (1927–1928)
1927	St. Edward's	3–3–3	1–1–1	4th		
1928	St. Edward's	6–5	3–1	2nd		
St. Edward's:						
Rice Owls (Southwest Conference) (1929–1933)
1929	Rice	2–7	0–5	7th		
1930	Rice	8–4	2–4	6th		
1931	Rice	6–4	3–3	4th		
1932	Rice	7–3	3–3	3rd		
1933	Rice	3–8	1–5	7th		
Rice:		26–26	9–20			
Auburn Tigers (Southeastern Conference) (1934–1942)
1934	Auburn	2–8	1–6	10th		
1935	Auburn	8–2	5–2	4th		
1936	Auburn	7–2–2	4–1–1	3rd	T Bacardi	
1937	Auburn	6–2–3	4–1–2	3rd	W Orange	
1938	Auburn	4–5–1	3–3–1	T–7th		
1939	Auburn	5–5–1	3–3–1	T–5th		
1940	Auburn	6–4–1	3–2–1	5th		
1941	Auburn	4–5–1	0–4–1	11th		
1942	Auburn	6–4–1	3–3	7th		16
Auburn:		48–37–10	26–25–7			
Iowa Pre-Flight Seahawks (Independent) (1944)
1944	Iowa Pre-Flight	10–1				6
Iowa Pre-Flight:		10–1				
Total:						
^{#}Rankings from final AP Poll.
