= 1937 Georgia Bulldogs football team =

American college football season

1937 Georgia Bulldogs football
- Conference: Southeastern Conference
- Record: 6–3–2 (1–2–2 SEC)
- Head coach: Harry Mehre (10th season)
- Home stadium: Sanford Stadium

1937 Southeastern Conference football standings
	Conf.					Overall
Team		W		L			W		L
No. 4 Alabama $	6	–	0	–	0	9	–	1	–	0
No. 8 LSU	5	–	1	–	0	9	–	2	–	0
Auburn	4	–	1	–	2	6	–	2	–	3
Vanderbilt	4	–	2	–	0	7	–	2	–	0
Mississippi State	3	–	2	–	0	5	–	4	–	1
Georgia Tech	3	–	2	–	1	6	–	3	–	1
Tennessee	4	–	3	–	0	6	–	3	–	1
Florida	3	–	4	–	0	4	–	7	–	0
Tulane	2	–	3	–	1	5	–	4	–	1
Georgia	1	–	2	–	2	6	–	3	–	2
Ole Miss	0	–	4	–	0	4	–	5	–	1
Kentucky	0	–	5	–	0	4	–	6	–	0
Sewanee	0	–	6	–	0	2	–	7	–	0
$ – Conference champion

The 1937 Georgia Bulldogs football team was an American football team that represented the University of Georgia as a member of the Southeastern Conference (SEC) during the 1937 college football season. In their 10th year under head coach Harry Mehre, the Bulldogs compiled an overall record of 6–3–2, with a conference record of 1–2–2, and finished 10th in the SEC.

== Schedule ==
Date	Time	Opponent	Site	Result	Attendance	Source
September 25		Oglethorpe*	Sanford Stadium; Athens, GA	W 60–0	5,000	
October 2		at South Carolina*	Columbia Municipal Stadium; Columbia, SC (rivalry)	W 13–7	15,000	
October 9		Clemson*	Sanford Stadium; Athens, GA (rivalry)	W 14–0	8,000	
October 16		at Holy Cross*	Fenway Park; Boston, MA	L 6–7		
October 23		Mercer*^{†}	Sanford Stadium; Athens, GA	W 19–0	5,000	
October 30		at Tennessee	Shields–Watkins Field; Knoxville, TN (rivalry)	L 0–32	17,000	
November 6		vs. Florida	Fairfield Stadium; Jacksonville, FL (rivalry)	L 0–6	20,000	
November 13		Tulane	Sanford Stadium; Athens, GA	W 7–6	12,000	
November 20		vs. Auburn	Memorial Stadium; Columbus, GA (rivalry)	T 0–0	16,000	
November 27		at Georgia Tech	Grant Field; Atlanta, GA (rivalry)	T 6–6	28,000	
December 10	8:15 p.m.	at Miami (FL)*	Burdine Stadium; Miami, FL	W 26–0	20,000	
*Non-conference game; ^{†}Homecoming; All times are in Eastern time
