= 1937 Georgia Tech Yellow Jackets football team =

American college football season

1937 Georgia Tech Yellow Jackets football
- Conference: Southeastern Conference
- Record: 6–3–1 (3–2–1 SEC)
- Head coach: William Alexander (18th season)
- Offensive scheme: Single-wing
- Captain: Fletcher Sims
- Home stadium: Grant Field

1937 Southeastern Conference football standings
	Conf.					Overall
Team		W		L			W		L
No. 4 Alabama $	6	–	0	–	0	9	–	1	–	0
No. 8 LSU	5	–	1	–	0	9	–	2	–	0
Auburn	4	–	1	–	2	6	–	2	–	3
Vanderbilt	4	–	2	–	0	7	–	2	–	0
Mississippi State	3	–	2	–	0	5	–	4	–	1
Georgia Tech	3	–	2	–	1	6	–	3	–	1
Tennessee	4	–	3	–	0	6	–	3	–	1
Florida	3	–	4	–	0	4	–	7	–	0
Tulane	2	–	3	–	1	5	–	4	–	1
Georgia	1	–	2	–	2	6	–	3	–	2
Ole Miss	0	–	4	–	0	4	–	5	–	1
Kentucky	0	–	5	–	0	4	–	6	–	0
Sewanee	0	–	6	–	0	2	–	7	–	0
$ – Conference champion

The 1937 Georgia Tech Yellow Jackets football team was an American football team that represented Georgia Tech as a member of the Southeastern Conference (SEC) during the 1937 college football season. In their 18th year under head coach William Alexander, the Yellow Jackets compiled an overall record of 6–3–1, with a conference record of 3–2–1, and finished sixth in the SEC.

== Schedule ==
Date	Opponent	Site	Result	Attendance	Source
September 24	Presbyterian*	Grant Field; Atlanta, GA	W 59–0	12,000	
October 2	Mercer*	Grant Field; Atlanta, GA	W 28–0		
October 9	at Kentucky	McLean Stadium; Lexington, KY	W 32–0	7,500	
October 16	Duke*	Grant Field; Atlanta, GA	L 19–20	26,000	
October 23	No. 20 Auburn	Grant Field; Atlanta, GA (rivalry)	L 0–21	19,000	
October 30	No. 7 Vanderbilt	Grant Field; Atlanta, GA (rivalry)	W 14–0	20,000	
November 6	Clemson*	Grant Field; Atlanta, GA (rivalry)	W 7–0	12,000	
November 13	at No. 3 Alabama	Legion Field; Birmingham, AL (rivalry)	L 0–7	26,000	
November 20	at Florida	Florida Field; Gainesville, FL	W 12–0	16,000	
November 27	Georgia	Grant Field; Atlanta, GA (rivalry)	T 6–6	28,000	
*Non-conference game; Rankings from AP Poll released prior to the game
