= 1937 Auburn Tigers football team =

American college football season

1937 Auburn Tigers football

Orange Bowl champion

Orange Bowl, W 6–0 vs. Michigan State
- Conference: Southeastern Conference
- Record: 6–2–3 (4–1–2 SEC)
- Head coach: Jack Meagher (4th season)
- Home stadium: Legion Field; Cramton Bowl

1937 Southeastern Conference football standings
	Conf.					Overall
Team		W		L			W		L
No. 4 Alabama $	6	–	0	–	0	9	–	1	–	0
No. 8 LSU	5	–	1	–	0	9	–	2	–	0
Auburn	4	–	1	–	2	6	–	2	–	3
Vanderbilt	4	–	2	–	0	7	–	2	–	0
Mississippi State	3	–	2	–	0	5	–	4	–	1
Georgia Tech	3	–	2	–	1	6	–	3	–	1
Tennessee	4	–	3	–	0	6	–	3	–	1
Florida	3	–	4	–	0	4	–	7	–	0
Tulane	2	–	3	–	1	5	–	4	–	1
Georgia	1	–	2	–	2	6	–	3	–	2
Ole Miss	0	–	4	–	0	4	–	5	–	1
Kentucky	0	–	5	–	0	4	–	6	–	0
Sewanee	0	–	6	–	0	2	–	7	–	0
$ – Conference champion

The 1937 Auburn Tigers football team represented Auburn University in the 1937 college football season. The Tigers' were led by head coach Jack Meagher in his fourth season and finished the season with a record of six wins, two losses and three ties (6–2–3 overall, 4–1–2 in the SEC).

== Schedule ==
Date	Opponent	Rank	Site	Result	Attendance	Source
September 24	Birmingham–Southern*		Cramton Bowl; Montgomery, AL	W 19–0	15,000	
October 4	at Tulane		Tulane Stadium; New Orleans, LA (rivalry)	T 0–0		
October 9	at Villanova*		Shibe Park; Philadelphia, PA	T 0–0	15,000	
October 16	Mississippi State		Legion Field; Birmingham, AL	W 33–7	15,000	
October 23	at Georgia Tech	No. 20	Grant Field; Atlanta, GA (rivalry)	W 21–0	19,000	
October 30	at Rice*	No. 12	Rice Field; Houston, TX	L 7–13		
November 6	No. 15 Tennessee		Legion Field; Birmingham, AL (rivalry)	W 20–7	18,000	
November 13	at No. 12 LSU	No. 14	Tiger Stadium; Baton Rouge, LA (rivalry)	L 7–9	30,000	
November 20	vs. Georgia		Memorial Stadium; Columbus, GA (rivalry)	T 0–0	16,000	
November 27	at Florida		Fairfield Stadium; Jacksonville, FL (rivalry)	W 14–0		
January 1, 1938	vs. Michigan State*		Burdine Stadium; Miami, FL (Orange Bowl)	W 6–0	18,970	
*Non-conference game; Rankings from AP Poll released prior to the game
