= Bernie Moore =

American college football coach (1895–1967)

Biographical details
- Born: April 30, 1895; Jonesborough, Tennessee, U.S.
- Died: November 6, 1967 (aged 72); Winchester, Tennessee, U.S.

Playing career

Football
- 1910s: Carson–Newman

Coaching career (HC unless noted)

Football
- 1923–1925: Sewanee (line)
- 1926–1928: Mercer
- 1929–1934: LSU (assistant)
- 1935–1947: LSU

Basketball
- 1926–1928: Mercer

Track and field
- 1930–1947: LSU

Administrative career (AD unless noted)
- 1926–1928: Mercer
- 1948–1966: SEC (commissioner)

Head coaching record
- Overall: 95–51–9 (football); 24–11 (basketball)
- Bowls: 1–3–1

Accomplishments and honors

Championships
- Football; 2 SEC (1935–1936)

Awards
- Amos Alonzo Stagg Award (1966); Corbett Award (1967); Louisiana Sports Hall of Fame; Tennessee Sports Hall of Fame
- College Football Hall of Fame; Inducted in 1952 (profile)

Bernie Hawthorne Moore (April 30, 1895 – November 6, 1967) was an American college football, basketball, track and field coach and college athletics administrator. He served as the head football coach at Mercer University (1926–1928) and Louisiana State University (LSU) (1935–1947). Moore was also the head basketball coach at Mercer (1926–1928) and the head track and field coach at LSU (1930–1947). He was then SEC commissioner from 1948 to 1966. He was inducted into the College Football Hall of Fame in 1952.

== Early life ==
Moore was the youngest of 14 children, the son of a Baptist minister. He graduated from Carson–Newman College in Jefferson City, Tennessee, where he played football and baseball.

== Career ==
=== Coach ===
Moore coached football, baseball, basketball, and track at Winchester and LaGrange high schools, and Allen Military Academy, before receiving the position of line coach for Sewanee.

==== Mercer ====
Moore coached the Mercer Bears from 1926 to 1928. Phoney Smith, Mercer's all-time leading scorer, was the first southern player to cross the goal line against the 1927 "dream and wonder" team of Georgia on a 95-yard kickoff return. Later Georgia coach Wally Butts was also one of Moore's players at Mercer.

==== LSU ====
Moore came to Louisiana State University in 1929 as an assistant coach for Russ Cohen's LSU Tigers football team. He became the coach of the LSU Tigers track and field team in 1930. His 1933 track team won the national championship.

Moore took over the LSU football head coaching job in 1935 after the resignation of Biff Jones, and was a popular choice among the football players. Moore's 1935 Tigers posted a 9–2 record and the school's first Southeastern Conference championship.

=== Commissioner ===
After ending his tenure at LSU, the longest of any coach at the university to that point, Moore became SEC Commissioner in 1948. In 1967, he won the inaugural James J. Corbett Memorial Award given by the National Association of Collegiate Directors of Athletics.

== Later life and legacy ==
Moore was inducted into the Louisiana Sports Hall of Fame in 1963 and the Tennessee Sports Hall of Fame in 1966. LSU's Bernie Moore Track Stadium is named in his honor. He died on November 6, 1967, in Winchester, Tennessee. Frank Rose, former University of Alabama president, said Moore's "energies, his demand for total integrity, and his devotion to clean sports and good academics have left their mark on the campuses of every SEC member. For that, we are grateful."

== Head coaching record ==
=== Football ===
Year	Team	Overall	Conference	Standing	Bowl/playoffs	AP^{#}
Mercer Bears (Southern Intercollegiate Athletic Association) (1926–1928)
1926	Mercer	4–3–2	3–1–1	T–4th		
1927	Mercer	5–4	2–2	10th		
1928	Mercer	3–5–1	2–2–1	15th		
Mercer:		12–12–3				
LSU Tigers (Southeastern Conference) (1935–1947)
1935	LSU	9–2	5–0	1st	L Sugar	
1936	LSU	9–1–1	6–0	1st	L Sugar	2
1937	LSU	9–2	5–1	2nd	L Sugar	8
1938	LSU	6–4	2–4	10th		
1939	LSU	4–5	1–5	10th		
1940	LSU	6–4	3–3	6th		
1941	LSU	4–4–2	2–2–2	7th		
1942	LSU	7–3	3–2	6th		
1943	LSU	6–3	2–2	2nd	W Orange	
1944	LSU	2–5–1	2–3–1	6th		
1945	LSU	7–2	5–2	3rd		15
1946	LSU	9–1–1	5–1	3rd	T Cotton	8
1947	LSU	5–3–1	2–3–1	8th		
LSU:		83–39–6	43–28–4			
Total:		95–51–9				
National championship Conference title Conference division title or championship game berth
^{#}Rankings from final AP Poll.
