= 1938 Sugar Bowl =

American college football game

- 4th Sugar Bowl
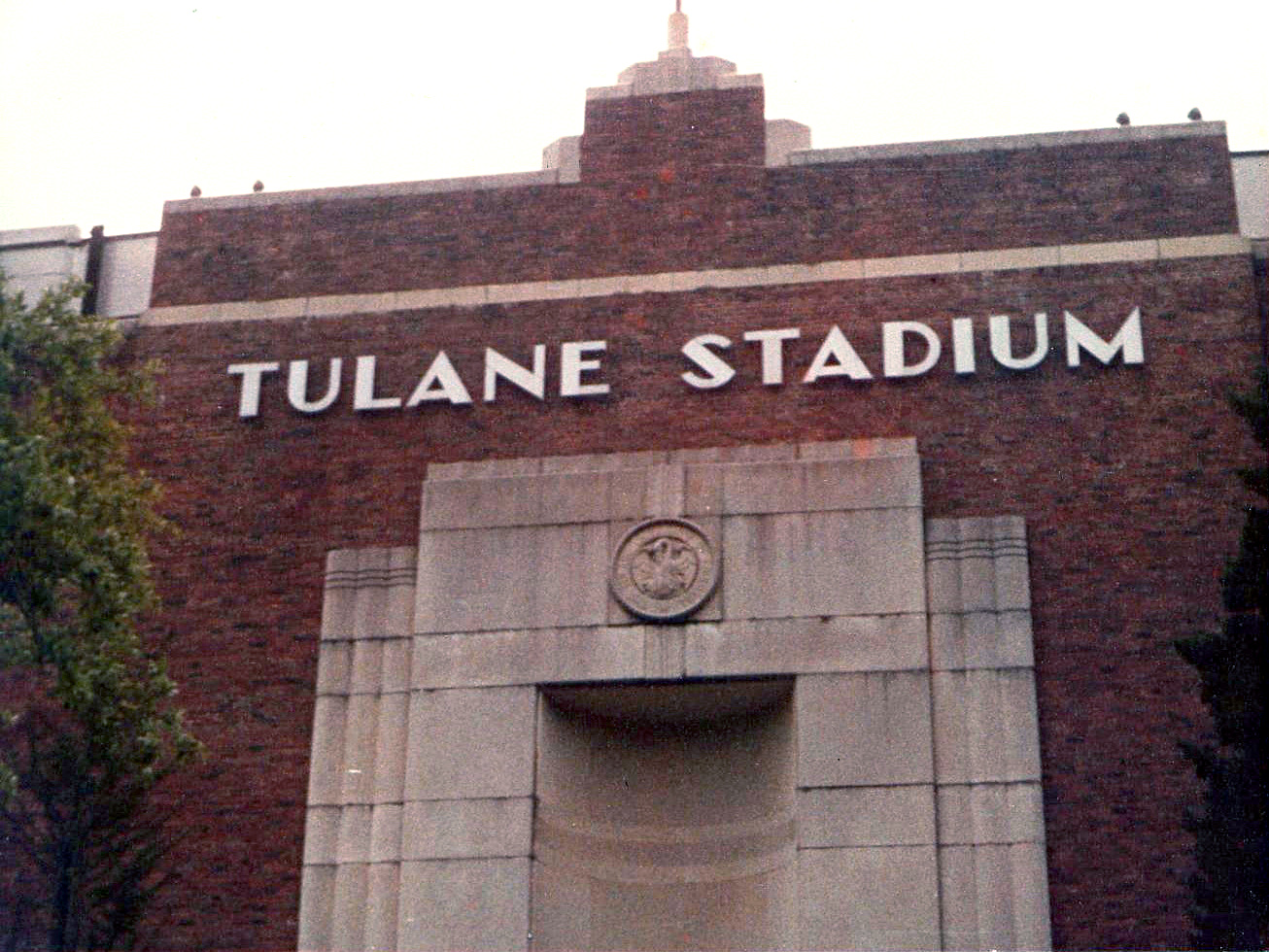
- Tulane Stadium in New Orleans, Louisiana, hosted the Sugar Bowl.
Santa Clara Broncos	LSU Tigers
(8–0)	(9–1)
Independent	SEC
6	0
Head coach: Buck Shaw	Head coach: Bernie Moore
AP 9	AP 8
	1	2	3	4	Total
Santa Clara	6	0	0	0	6
LSU	0	0	0	0	0
- Date: January 1, 1938
- Season: 1937
- Stadium: Tulane Stadium
- Location: New Orleans, Louisiana
- Favorite: LSU
- Referee: Lou Ervin
- Attendance: 40,000

The 1938 Sugar Bowl was the fourth edition of the Sugar Bowl and featured the LSU Tigers and the Santa Clara Broncos in a rematch of the previous year's game. It was played on Saturday, January 1, 1938, at Tulane Stadium in New Orleans, Louisiana.

== Background ==
LSU was invited to the Sugar Bowl for the third consecutive season, and was a slight favorite. The Broncos were undefeated on the season and as such were invited to the Sugar Bowl once again. In the final AP poll released in late November, LSU was eighth and Santa Clara was tied for ninth with Notre Dame.

== Game summary ==
In the rain, LSU failed to capitalize despite having fewer turnovers, more first downs, and more yards than the Broncos. At one point, Pinky Rohm tried to score from the Bronco 3, but he was stopped by Al Wolff as the Broncos went to work on a drive, culminating with a Jim Coughlan touchdown catch from Bruno Pellegrini. LSU kept trying to get on the scoreboard, but they kept turning it over on downs and were stopped at Santa Clara's 23 on the final play, as Santa Clara topped the Tigers for a second straight year.

== Aftermath ==
LSU had to wait five years to gain their first bowl win, at the Orange Bowl in Miami. Santa Clara's next (and final) bowl game appearance came after the 1949 season, a win at the Orange Bowl in over Kentucky.

== Statistics ==
Statistics	Santa Clara	LSU
First downs	4	10
Yards rushing	34	106
Yards passing	67	95
Total yards	101	201
Punts-Average	14–36	14–32
Fumbles lost	3	0
Interceptions	3	0
Penalty yards	30	35
