= Carl Hinkle =

American football player (1917–1992)

Profile
- Position: Center

Personal information
- Born: March 3, 1917; Hendersonville, Tennessee, U.S.
- Died: November 15, 1992 (aged 75); Little Rock, Arkansas, U.S.

Career information
- College: Vanderbilt University
- NFL draft: 1938: 11th round, 92nd overall pick

Awards and highlights
- First-team All-American (1937); SEC Player of the Year (1937); First-team All-SEC (1937)
- College Football Hall of Fame

Carl Columbus Hinkle Jr. (March 3, 1917 – November 15, 1992) was an American college football player who was a stand-out center for the Vanderbilt Commodores football team. He was elected to the College Football Hall of Fame in 1959. He was drafted in the 11th round of the 1938 NFL draft with the 92nd overall pick.
