= Joe Kilgrow =

American football player and coach (1917–1967)

Biographical details
- Born: August 30, 1917; Montgomery, Alabama, U.S.
- Died: July 21, 1967 (aged 49); Tuscaloosa, Alabama, U.S.
- Education: University of Alabama

Playing career
- 1935–1937: Alabama
- Position: Halfback

Coaching career (HC unless noted)
- 1938–1939: Alabama (freshmen backfield)
- 1940–1941: Mercer (backfield)
- 1946: Alabama (assistant backfield/freshmen)
- 1947–1954: Alabama (freshmen)
- 1955: Alabama (backfield) (Note: Coached the backfield alongside Butch Avinger and Tilden Campbell.)
- 1956–1957: Alabama (freshmen)

Accomplishments and honors

Awards
- First-team All-American (1937); First-team All-SEC (1937); Second-team All-SEC (1936); Alabama Sports Hall of Fame

Joseph Flinn Kilgrow (August 30, 1917 – July 21, 1967) was an American college football player and coach.

== Early years ==
Kilgrow was born August 30, 1917, in Montgomery, Alabama, to Montgomery city auditor Benedict A. Kilgrow and Bessie Flinn. He had one brother, Ben Jr. Kilgrow attended Sidney Lanier High School.

== Playing career ==
Kilgrow was a prominent halfback for the Alabama Crimson Tide football team of the University of Alabama.

In 1937, Kilgrow was selected a first-team All-American by the International News Service. In 1938, he finished 5th in the Heisman voting. He was drafted in the second round of the 1938 NFL draft.

== Coaching career ==
In 1938, Kilgore was hired as the freshmen backfield coach for his alma mater, Alabama. In 1940, he was hired as the backfield at Mercer before his career was interrupted by the war in 1942.

After four years in the service, Kilgrow returned to Alabama in 1946 as the assistant backfield coach and freshmen coach. He was promoted to a full-time coach in 1947, coaching the freshmen team only. In 1955, alongside Butch Avinger and Tilden Campbell, he assisted with the offensive backfield.

== Personal life, military career, and honors ==
During World War II, Kilgore served as an anti-aircraft gunner in Australia for the United States Coast Guard Auxiliary. He served as a lieutenant and participated in the New Guinea campaign. He was promoted for "outstanding leadership" after defending against a Japanese raid. Kilgrow's brother, Ben Jr., was captured by the German Army in 1944. Kilgrow returned from service in May 1945 with the rank of first lieutenant.

Kilgore died on July 21, 1967, at Druid City Hospital in Tuscaloosa, Alabama.

Kilgore was inducted into the Alabama Sports Hall of Fame in 1989.
