= 1938 Orange Bowl =

American college football game

- 4th Orange Bowl
- Burdine Stadium in Miami, Florida, hosted the Orange Bowl.
Auburn Tigers	Michigan State Spartans
(5–2–3)	(8–1)
SEC	Independent
6	0
Head coach: Jack Meagher	Head coach: Charlie Bachman
	1	2	3	4	Total
Auburn	0	6	0	0	6
Michigan State	0	0	0	0	0
- Date: January 1, 1938
- Season: 1937
- Stadium: Burdine Stadium
- Location: Miami, Florida
- Referee: Tom Thorp
- Attendance: 18,972

The 1938 Orange Bowl was a college football bowl game between the Auburn Tigers and Michigan State Spartans played at Burdine Stadium in Miami, Florida, on January 1, 1938. It was the fourth Orange Bowl, and the first held in the stadium. The Tigers won by a score of 6–0, with the game's only points coming in the second quarter on a two-yard touchdown run by Ralph O'Gwynne. The game holds the Orange Bowl record for the fewest points scored by both teams.

== Pre-game buildup ==
The 1938 Orange Bowl was the fourth game in the annual series. It was the first to be played at Burdine Stadium, which had been built at a cost of $360,000 after the first three games were held in Miami Stadium. A total of 18,972 people attended the contest, more than doubling the event's highest attendance to that point, in the stadium that in 1959 had its name changed to the Miami Orange Bowl.

At a meeting of college football coaches, 10 were asked by the Associated Press to pick winners of bowl games. Of the eight coaches who responded, all but one selected Auburn to win the Orange Bowl.

=== Michigan State ===
Michigan State, coached by Charlie Bachman, began the 1937 college football season with a 34–6 home victory over Wayne State. The Spartans, who were not members of an athletic conference, then traveled to Ann Arbor and defeated Michigan by a score of 19–14. One week later, the Spartans lost 3–0 to Manhattan in a game played in New York City. Michigan State then went on a six-game winning streak to end the regular season, which included victories against Missouri, Kansas, and Temple. Four of the Spartans' eight wins during the season were by a margin of at least 14 points. The Spartans were invited to the Orange Bowl, and agreed to participate on November 30.

=== Auburn ===
The Tigers—often nicknamed the "Plainsmen" by the media of the time—were coached by Jack Meagher. Auburn started the season by defeating Birmingham–Southern 45–0. That game was followed by consecutive scoreless ties against Tulane and Villanova. The Tigers then won in Birmingham against Mississippi State, 33–7, and at Georgia Tech, 21–0, to improve to 3–0–2 on the season. On October 30, the Tigers lost for the first time in 1937, falling 13–7 to Rice. In their remaining four games, Auburn defeated Tennessee 20–7, lost at LSU 9–7, tied 0–0 with Georgia, and won 14–0 over Florida. Auburn accepted its invitation six days after Michigan State, having gained permission from the rest of its conference, the Southeastern Conference (SEC). The Tigers needed a change in SEC rules to participate in the Orange Bowl because the conference had instituted a ban on postseason participation in games other than the Rose Bowl or Sugar Bowl earlier in 1937. On December 10, the SEC dropped its ban, provided that a majority of the conference's membership voted in favor of a team's bowl appearance.

== Game summary ==
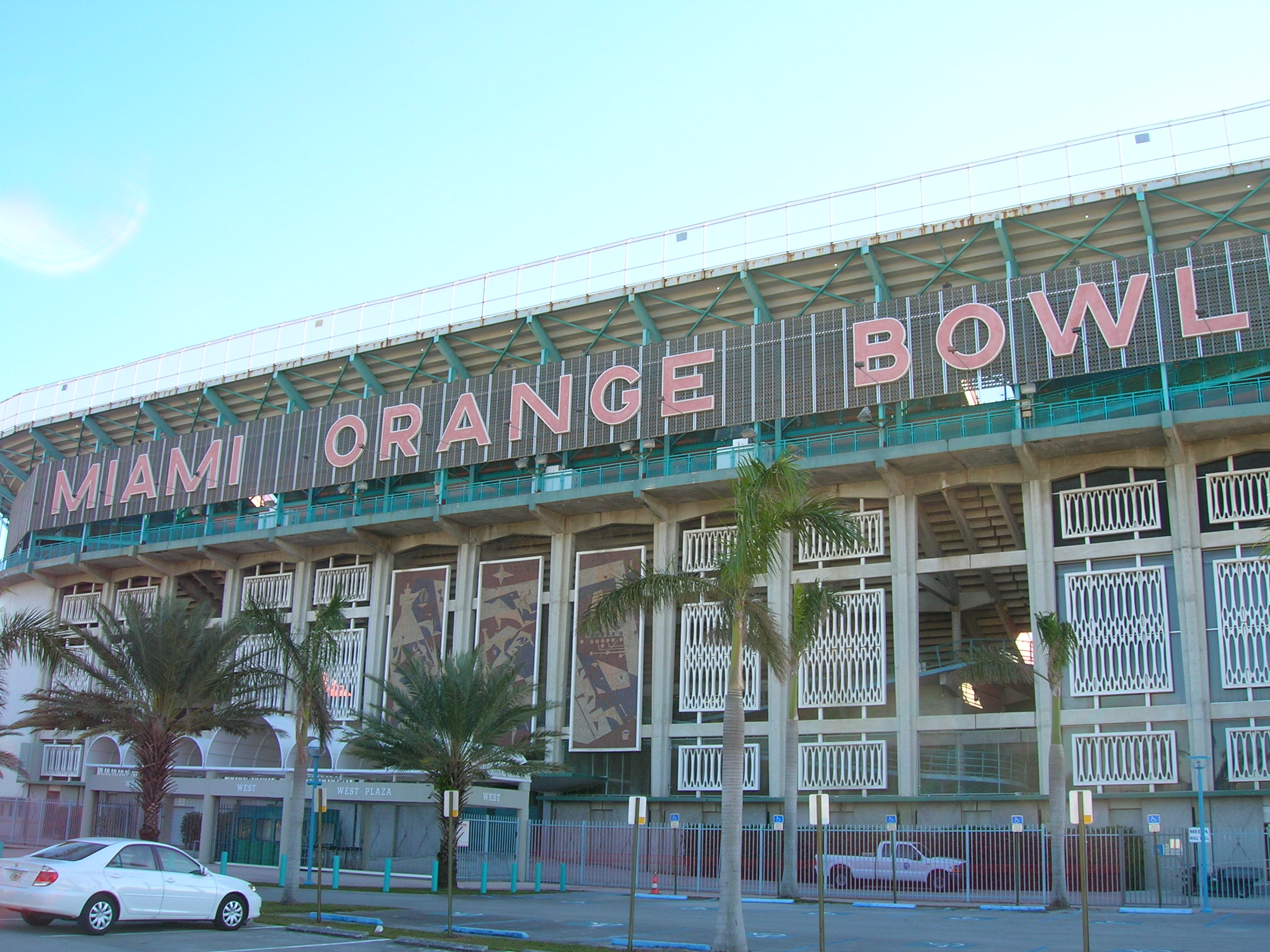
The Miami Orange Bowl stadium was the site of the 1938 Orange Bowl

In the first quarter, Auburn threatened twice to score the game's first points, but could not convert on either occasion. First, the Tigers used running plays by halfbacks Spec Kelly and Jimmy Fenton to go into Michigan State's half of the field, ultimately reaching the Spartans' 12-yard-line; the drive included a 25-yard rush by Fenton. Following three runs, the Tigers faced a fourth down play, and elected to go for a first down or touchdown. Fenton attempted a pass, but it was incomplete, and Auburn lost possession to Michigan State. The Spartans punted back to the Tigers, and John Pingel's kick went out of bounds at Auburn's 37-yard-line. Kelly picked up one first down with a 17-yard rush, and a second on a pass to Dutch Heath. Auburn, however, turned the ball over on a Tom McShannock interception of a Kelly pass attempt. McShannock returned the interception 29 yards downfield, but the Spartans were unable to gain a first down during the subsequent drive. Late in the quarter, Kelly gained 26 yards on a running play, giving the Tigers a field position advantage.

At the beginning of the second quarter, Meagher pulled Auburn's starters from the game, and inserted the team's backups. The Spartans took out their defensive starters as well. After Michigan State regained possession of the ball, the Spartans were forced to punt again. George Kenmore, who had been put into the game at quarterback, fielded the punt from Gene Ciolek and returned it to the Spartans' 36-yard-line. The Tigers ran a running play for Pelham Sitz; accounts of the game differ on how much yardage he gained, varying from five to nine yards. A penalty was called on Auburn for offside, followed by a Kenmore pass attempt, which he completed to Ralph O'Gwynne. The wide receiver caught the ball at the Spartans' 15, and was tackled inside the 10; the tackle location ranges in published reports from the two-to-five yard lines. Either two or three rushing attempts followed, which ended up short of the end zone. The following play was a run by O'Gwynne, who crossed the goal line for a touchdown while being tackled by Ed Pearce. The Orange Bowl's website credits O'Gwynne with a gain of two yards on the play. The Tigers took a 6–0 lead on the run, and the score remained unchanged when placekicker Garth Thorpe failed to convert an extra point attempt. There was no further scoring in the second quarter, and Auburn held its lead entering halftime.

During the third quarter, Pearce gained 29 yards on a rush, giving the Spartans their first first down of the game. The drive stalled with Michigan State unable to reach Auburn's half of the field. The Spartans prevented the Tigers' offense from scoring, and writer H. J. Aronstam commented that "The Spartans played their best in the third period." Near the end of the quarter, Michigan State had possession and Pingel attempted a pass to Ernie Bremer. Heath, however, intercepted the pass off a deflection. The Tigers quickly advanced down the field, and a 17-yard pass completion from Kenmore to Heath placed the ball in the Spartans' red zone. No points were scored on the drive, as a fourth-down pass into the end zone was unsuccessful.

Auburn entered the fourth quarter still leading 6–0. The team attempted to increase its lead with a 50-yard drive, which advanced the ball to the Spartans' 26-yard-line. Again, Michigan State's defense held, and the Tigers were unable to pad the lead. Auburn again threatened to score later in the quarter, moving the ball inside the Spartans' 30-yard-line, but was turned away once more without scoring. Meanwhile, the Spartans gained their second first down of the contest in the middle of the quarter when Pingel completed a 23-yard pass. Michigan State was later forced to punt once more without crossing the 50-yard-line. Aronstam wrote that "The Spartans opened a shoot-the-works offensive in the final quarter, but could not penetrate Auburn's stout line with any degree of consistency." The game ended without further scoring, resulting in a 6–0 victory for the Tigers.

== Statistical summary ==
Auburn gained 13 first downs during the game, 11 more than Michigan State, and had a large advantage in total offense, 278 yards to 65. The Tigers ran for 197 yards on the day; Fenton led the team with 76 yards rushing, and Kelly, Heath, and Sitz added 61, 37, and 31 yards respectively. O'Gwynne, who scored the game's only points with his second-quarter touchdown, had 13 rushing yards. For the Spartans, Pearce gained 29 of the team's 40 rushing yards. Pingel, who was named an All-America halfback for his performance during 1937, carried the ball seven times for 12 yards. In the passing game, the Tigers had the advantage in yards gained, 81–25. Both teams were unsuccessful on more than half their pass attempts. however, and there were nearly as many interceptions (five) as passes completed (six). The game's total of six points remains the fewest scored by both teams in an Orange Bowl. Auburn holds the Orange Bowl record for the fewest points scored by a winning team, and the Spartans were one of eight teams to be shut out in an Orange Bowl.

== Bibliography ==
- Capital One Orange Bowl 2016 Official Media Guide (PDF). Orange Bowl. 2016.
- ESPN College Football Encyclopedia: The Complete History Of The Game. New York City: ESPN Books. 2005. ISBN 1-4013-3703-1.
- Grasso, John (2013). Historical Dictionary of Football. Lanham, Maryland: Scarecrow Press. ISBN 978-0-8108-7857-0.
