= 1937 LSU Tigers football team =

American college football season

1937 LSU Tigers football

Sugar Bowl, L 0–6 vs. Santa Clara
- Conference: Southeastern Conference

Ranking
- AP: No. 8
- Record: 9–2 (5–1 SEC)
- Head coach: Bernie Moore (3rd season)
- Captain: Arthur Morton
- Home stadium: Tiger Stadium

1937 Southeastern Conference football standings
	Conf.					Overall
Team		W		L			W		L
No. 4 Alabama $	6	–	0	–	0	9	–	1	–	0
No. 8 LSU	5	–	1	–	0	9	–	2	–	0
Auburn	4	–	1	–	2	6	–	2	–	3
Vanderbilt	4	–	2	–	0	7	–	2	–	0
Mississippi State	3	–	2	–	0	5	–	4	–	1
Georgia Tech	3	–	2	–	1	6	–	3	–	1
Tennessee	4	–	3	–	0	6	–	3	–	1
Florida	3	–	4	–	0	4	–	7	–	0
Tulane	2	–	3	–	1	5	–	4	–	1
Georgia	1	–	2	–	2	6	–	3	–	2
Ole Miss	0	–	4	–	0	4	–	5	–	1
Kentucky	0	–	5	–	0	4	–	6	–	0
Sewanee	0	–	6	–	0	2	–	7	–	0
$ – Conference champion

The 1937 LSU Tigers football team was an American football team that represented Louisiana State University (LSU) as a member of the Southeastern Conference (SEC) during the 1937 college football season. In their third year under head coach Bernie Moore, the Tigers compiled an overall record of 9–2, with a conference record of 5–1, and finished second in the SEC.

== Schedule ==
Date	Opponent	Rank	Site	Result	Attendance	Source
September 25	Florida		Tiger Stadium; Baton Rouge, LA (rivalry)	W 19–0	15,000	
October 2	Texas*		Tiger Stadium; Baton Rouge, LA	W 9–0	10,000	
October 9	at Rice*		Rice Field; Houston, TX	W 13–0		
October 16	Ole Miss		Tiger Stadium; Baton Rouge, LA (rivalry)	W 13–0	25,000	
October 23	at No. 20 Vanderbilt	No. 6	Dudley Field; Nashville, TN	L 6–7	15,000	
October 30	Loyola (LA)*	No. 17	Tiger Stadium; Baton Rouge, LA	W 52–6		
November 6	Mississippi State^{†}	No. 18	Tiger Stadium; Baton Rouge, LA (rivalry)	W 41–0	20,000	
November 13	No. 14 Auburn	No. 15	Tiger Stadium; Baton Rouge, LA (rivalry)	W 9–7	30,000	
November 20	Louisiana Normal*	No. 8	Tiger Stadium; Baton Rouge, LA	W 52–0	5,000	
November 27	at Tulane	No. 10	Tulane Stadium; New Orleans, LA (Battle for the Rag)	W 20–7		
January 1, 1938	No. 9 Santa Clara	No. 8	Tulane Stadium; New Orleans, LA (Sugar Bowl)	L 0–6	40,000	
*Non-conference game; ^{†}Homecoming; Rankings from AP Poll released prior to the game
