= 1938 Rose Bowl =

American college football game

- 24th Rose Bowl Game
California Golden Bears	Alabama Crimson Tide
(9–0–1)	(9–0)
PCC	SEC
13	0
Head coach: Stub Allison	Head coach: Frank Thomas
AP 2	AP 4
	1	2	3	4	Total
California	0	7	6	0	13
Alabama	0	0	0	0	0
- Date: January 1, 1938
- Season: 1937
- Stadium: Rose Bowl
- Location: Pasadena, California
- MVP: Vic Bottari (California HB)
- Favorite: California by 10 to 13 points
- Referee: Tom Louttit
- Attendance: 89,650

The 1938 Rose Bowl was the 24th edition of the college football bowl game, played at the Rose Bowl in Pasadena, California, on Saturday, January 1. The game featured the second-ranked California Golden Bears of the Pacific Coast Conference (PCC) against the #4 Alabama Crimson Tide of the Southeastern Conference (SEC), two of the top teams from the 1937 college football season. This game was the fifth trip to Pasadena for the Tide, which had gone without a loss in the previous four.

== Game summary ==
The game was a Vic Bottari and Sam Chapman show, as the duo combined for all 13 points. It was Alabama's first loss in the Rose Bowl, which prompted former Los Angeles Examiner reporter Maxwell Stiles to write: “The Crimson Tide was at its ebb, Alabama at last had lost a Rose Bowl Game.”

=== Scoring ===
==== First quarter ====
No scoring

==== Second quarter ====
- Cal – Vic Bottari, 4-yard run (Sam Chapman kick good)

==== Third quarter ====
- Cal – Bottari, 5-yard run (Chapman kick failed)

==== Fourth quarter ====
No scoring

== Aftermath ==
California's record in the Rose Bowl improved to 2–1–1, but this remains their most recent victory, with four losses since. The Golden Bears' next appearance was eleven years away, and the most recent was 66 years ago in January 1959.

Alabama's record in Pasadena dropped to 3–1–1; their next Rose Bowl was a win in January 1946, the last edition prior to the exclusive agreement with the Big Nine (now Big Ten). The Tide played in three major bowls in between, with two wins.
