= 1933 Murray State Thoroughbreds football team =

American college football season

1933 Murray State Thoroughbreds football

SIAA champion
- Conference: Southern Intercollegiate Athletic Association
- Record: 9–0 (7–0 SIAA)
- Head coach: Roy Stewart (2nd season)

1933 Southern Intercollegiate Athletic Association football standings
	Conf.					Overall
Team	W		L		T	W		L		T
Murray State $	7	–	0	–	0	9	–	0	–	0
Howard (AL)	5	–	0	–	0	7	–	1	–	2
Centenary	3	–	0	–	0	8	–	0	–	4
Furman	4	–	0	–	1	6	–	1	–	2
Union (KY)	3	–	0	–	1	4	–	1	–	1
Miami (FL)	2	–	0	–	1	5	–	1	–	2
Western Kentucky State Teachers	5	–	1	–	0	6	–	2	–	0
Centre	3	–	1	–	0	7	–	3	–	0
Loyola (LA)	3	–	1	–	0	6	–	4	–	1
Rollins	2	–	1	–	0	6	–	2	–	0
SW Louisiana	3	–	2	–	0	6	–	3	–	0
Presbyterian	3	–	2	–	0	4	–	2	–	2
Millsaps	3	–	2	–	1	4	–	4	–	2
Newberry	2	–	2	–	1	6	–	3	–	1
Tennessee Tech	2	–	2	–	0	4	–	4	–	0
The Citadel	2	–	2	–	1	3	–	5	–	1
Louisiana Normal	2	–	3	–	0	6	–	3	–	0
Mississippi College	2	–	3	–	0	3	–	4	–	1
Georgetown (KY)	2	–	3	–	1	2	–	5	–	1
Mississippi State Teachers	2	–	4	–	1	3	–	5	–	2
Southwestern (TN)	1	–	2	–	0	3	–	4	–	2
Louisiana Tech	1	–	3	–	0	1	–	7	–	0
Louisiana College	1	–	4	–	0	3	–	4	–	0
Wofford	1	–	4	–	0	3	–	6	–	0
Transylvania	1	–	4	–	0	1	–	7	–	1
Erskine	1	–	5	–	0	2	–	7	–	0
Union (TN)	1	–	5	–	0	3	–	7	–	0
Louisville	1	–	6	–	0	1	–	7	–	0
Mercer	0	–	0	–	1	4	–	3	–	2
Stetson	0	–	0	–	1	3	–	3	–	1
Eastern Kentucky State Teachers	0	–	2	–	2	1	–	2	–	3
Middle Tennessee State Teachers	0	–	4	–	0	1	–	7	–	1
$ – Conference champion

The 1933 Murray State Thoroughbreds football team was an American football team that represented Murray State Teachers College—now known as Murray State University—as a member of the Southern Intercollegiate Athletic Association (SIAA) during the 1933 college football season. Led by second-year head coach Roy Stewart, the Thoroughbreds compiled an overall record of 9–0 with a mark of 7–0 in conference play, winning the SIAA title.

== Schedule ==
Date	Opponent	Site	Result	Source
September 29	Southern Illinois*	Murray, KY	W 13–0	
October 6	Union (KY)	Murray, KY	W 20–0	
October 14	at Western Kentucky State Teachers	Bowling Green, KY (rivalry)	W 20–6	
October 21	Lambuth*	Murray, KY	W 26–0	
October 28	Middle Tennessee State Teachers^{†}	Murray, KY	W 70–7	
November 4	at Louisville	Parkway Field; Louisville, KY	W 54–6	
November 11	Tennessee Tech	Cookeville, TN	W 9–6	
November 17	Millsaps	Murray, KY	W 13–0	
December 1	Mississippi State Teachers	Murray, KY	W 30–0	
*Non-conference game; ^{†}Homecoming
