= Roy Stewart (American football) =

American football coach and college athletics administrator

Biographical details
- Born: August 28, 1901
- Died: April 5, 1980 (aged 78); Murray, Kentucky, U.S.

Coaching career (HC unless noted)
- 1927–1930: Union (TN)
- 1931: Murray State (assistant)
- 1932–1940: Murray State
- 1942–1945: Murray State

Administrative career (AD unless noted)
- 1940–1966: Murray State

Head coaching record
- Overall: 71–54–14

Accomplishments and honors

Championships
- 2 SIAA (1933, 1937)

Roy Lee Stewart (August 28, 1901 – April 5, 1980) was an American football coach and college athletics administrator. He served as the head football coach at Union University in Jackson, Tennessee from 1927 to 1930 and Murray State Teachers College—now known as Murray State University—in Murray, Kentucky from 1932 to 1940 and again from 1942 to 1945. Stewart was also the athletic director at Murray State from 1940 to 1966 He came to Murray State in 1931 as an assistant coach. Stewart died on April 5, 1980, at Murray-Calloway County Hospital, in Murray, ten days after undergoing surgery.

== Head coaching record ==
Year	Team	Overall	Conference	Standing	Bowl/playoffs
Union (Tennessee) Bulldogs (Southern Intercollegiate Athletic Association) (1927–1930)
1927	Union (Tennessee)	6–4	2–3	T–13th	
1928	Union (Tennessee)	3–7	2–6	T–24th	
1929	Union (Tennessee)	1–5–1	0–5–1	T–29th	
1930	Union (Tennessee)	1–5–2	1–4	T–24th	
Union (Tennessee):		11–21–3	5–18–1		
Murray State Thoroughbreds (Southern Intercollegiate Athletic Association) (1932–1940)
1932	Murray State	4–2–3	3–2–1	T–12th	
1933	Murray State	9–0	7–0	1st	
1934	Murray State	6–3	5–2	10th	
1935	Murray State	3–5	2–4	T–22nd	
1936	Murray State	5–4	4–4	T–18th	
1937	Murray State	8–1–1	6–0–1	1st	
1938	Murray State	6–2–1	4–1	T–8th	
1939	Murray State	4–4–1	4–1–1	T–7th	
1940	Murray State	4–3–2	4–2–1	T–9th	
Murray State Thoroughbreds (Independent) (1942–1945)
1942	Murray State	1–5–2			
1943	No team—World War II				
1944	Murray State	5–2			
1945	Murray State	5–2–1			
Murray State:		60–33–11	39–16–4		
Total:		71–54–14			
National championship Conference title Conference division title or championship game berth
