= 1933 Centre Colonels football team =

American college football season

1933 Centre Colonels football
- Conference: Dixie Conference, Southern Intercollegiate Athletic Association
- Record: 7–3 (2–0 Dixie, 3–1 SIAA)
- Head coach: Ed Kubale (5th season)
- Home stadium: Cheek Field

1933 Dixie Conference football standings
	Conf.					Overall
Team	W		L		T	W		L		T
Howard (AL) $	4	–	0	–	1	7	–	1	–	2
Centre	2	–	0	–	0	7	–	3	–	0
Mercer	2	–	0	–	1	4	–	3	–	2
Birmingham–Southern	2	–	1	–	3	3	–	3	–	3
Mississippi College	1	–	1	–	1	3	–	4	–	1
Millsaps	1	–	1	–	1	4	–	4	–	2
Southwestern (TN)	1	–	3	–	1	3	–	4	–	2
Chattanooga	0	–	2	–	2	2	–	3	–	2
Spring Hill	0	–	5	–	0	0	–	7	–	1
$ – Conference champion

1933 Southern Intercollegiate Athletic Association football standings
	Conf.					Overall
Team	W		L		T	W		L		T
Murray State $	7	–	0	–	0	9	–	0	–	0
Howard (AL)	5	–	0	–	0	7	–	1	–	2
Centenary	3	–	0	–	0	8	–	0	–	4
Furman	4	–	0	–	1	6	–	1	–	2
Union (KY)	3	–	0	–	1	4	–	1	–	1
Miami (FL)	2	–	0	–	1	5	–	1	–	2
Western Kentucky State Teachers	5	–	1	–	0	6	–	2	–	0
Centre	3	–	1	–	0	7	–	3	–	0
Loyola (LA)	3	–	1	–	0	6	–	4	–	1
Rollins	2	–	1	–	0	6	–	2	–	0
SW Louisiana	3	–	2	–	0	6	–	3	–	0
Presbyterian	3	–	2	–	0	4	–	2	–	2
Millsaps	3	–	2	–	1	4	–	4	–	2
Newberry	2	–	2	–	1	6	–	3	–	1
Tennessee Tech	2	–	2	–	0	4	–	4	–	0
The Citadel	2	–	2	–	1	3	–	5	–	1
Louisiana Normal	2	–	3	–	0	6	–	3	–	0
Mississippi College	2	–	3	–	0	3	–	4	–	1
Georgetown (KY)	2	–	3	–	1	2	–	5	–	1
Mississippi State Teachers	2	–	4	–	1	3	–	5	–	2
Southwestern (TN)	1	–	2	–	0	3	–	4	–	2
Louisiana Tech	1	–	3	–	0	1	–	7	–	0
Louisiana College	1	–	4	–	0	3	–	4	–	0
Wofford	1	–	4	–	0	3	–	6	–	0
Transylvania	1	–	4	–	0	1	–	7	–	1
Erskine	1	–	5	–	0	2	–	7	–	0
Union (TN)	1	–	5	–	0	3	–	7	–	0
Louisville	1	–	6	–	0	1	–	7	–	0
Mercer	0	–	0	–	1	4	–	3	–	2
Stetson	0	–	0	–	1	3	–	3	–	1
Eastern Kentucky State Teachers	0	–	2	–	2	1	–	2	–	3
Middle Tennessee State Teachers	0	–	4	–	0	1	–	7	–	1
$ – Conference champion

The 1933 Centre Colonels football team represented Centre College as a member of the Dixie Conference and the Southern Intercollegiate Athletic Association (SIAA) in the 1933 college football season. Led by fifth-year head coach Ed Kubale, the Colonels compiled an overall record of 7–3 and with a mark of 2–0 in Dixie Conference play and 3–1 against SIAA competition. The team played home games at Cheek Field in Danville, Kentucky.

== Schedule ==
Date	Time	Opponent	Site	Result	Attendance	Source
September 30	2:15 p.m.	at Louisville	Parkway Field; Louisville, KY	W 30–0	8,000	
October 6	2:30 p.m.	at Transylvania	Thomas Field; Lexington, KY	W 36–0	3,000	
October 12	1:30 p.m.	at Boston College*	Alumni Field; Chestnut Hill, MA	L 0–6	15,000–20,000	
October 21	2:15 p.m.	Furman	Cheek Field; Danville, KY	L 6–7		
October 28	1:30 p.m.	at Xavier*	Corcoran Field; Cincinnati, OH	W 7–0	6,500	
November 4	1:30 p.m.	at Pittsburgh*	Pitt Stadium; Pittsburgh, PA	L 0–37	10,000	
November 11	2:15 p.m.	Birmingham–Southern	Cheek Field; Danville, KY	W 13–6	2,000	
November 18	2:00 p.m.	Washington and Lee*^{†}	Cheek Field; Danville, KY	W 12–0	8,000	
November 25		at Georgetown (KY)	Georgetown, KY	W 49–0		
November 30	2:00 p.m.	at Chattanooga	Chamberlain Field; Chattanooga, TN	W 13–6	2,500	
*Non-conference game; ^{†}Homecoming; All times are in Central time
