= 1933 Louisville Cardinals football team =

American college football season

1933 Louisville Cardinals football
- Conference: Southern Intercollegiate Athletic Association
- Record: 1–7 (1–6 SIAA)
- Head coach: Ben Cregor (1st season)
- Home stadium: Parkway Field

1933 Southern Intercollegiate Athletic Association football standings
	Conf.					Overall
Team	W		L		T	W		L		T
Murray State $	7	–	0	–	0	9	–	0	–	0
Howard (AL)	5	–	0	–	0	7	–	1	–	2
Centenary	3	–	0	–	0	8	–	0	–	4
Furman	4	–	0	–	1	6	–	1	–	2
Union (KY)	3	–	0	–	1	4	–	1	–	1
Miami (FL)	2	–	0	–	1	5	–	1	–	2
Western Kentucky State Teachers	5	–	1	–	0	6	–	2	–	0
Centre	3	–	1	–	0	7	–	3	–	0
Loyola (LA)	3	–	1	–	0	6	–	4	–	1
Rollins	2	–	1	–	0	6	–	2	–	0
SW Louisiana	3	–	2	–	0	6	–	3	–	0
Presbyterian	3	–	2	–	0	4	–	2	–	2
Millsaps	3	–	2	–	1	4	–	4	–	2
Newberry	2	–	2	–	1	6	–	3	–	1
Tennessee Tech	2	–	2	–	0	4	–	4	–	0
The Citadel	2	–	2	–	1	3	–	5	–	1
Louisiana Normal	2	–	3	–	0	6	–	3	–	0
Mississippi College	2	–	3	–	0	3	–	4	–	1
Georgetown (KY)	2	–	3	–	1	2	–	5	–	1
Mississippi State Teachers	2	–	4	–	1	3	–	5	–	2
Southwestern (TN)	1	–	2	–	0	3	–	4	–	2
Louisiana Tech	1	–	3	–	0	1	–	7	–	0
Louisiana College	1	–	4	–	0	3	–	4	–	0
Wofford	1	–	4	–	0	3	–	6	–	0
Transylvania	1	–	4	–	0	1	–	7	–	1
Erskine	1	–	5	–	0	2	–	7	–	0
Union (TN)	1	–	5	–	0	3	–	7	–	0
Louisville	1	–	6	–	0	1	–	7	–	0
Mercer	0	–	0	–	1	4	–	3	–	2
Stetson	0	–	0	–	1	3	–	3	–	1
Eastern Kentucky State Teachers	0	–	2	–	2	1	–	2	–	3
Middle Tennessee State Teachers	0	–	4	–	0	1	–	7	–	1
$ – Conference champion

The 1933 Louisville Cardinals football team was an American football team that represented the University of Louisville as a member of the Southern Intercollegiate Athletic Association (SIAA) during the 1933 college football season. In their first season under head coach Ben Cregor, the Cardinals compiled a 1–7 record.

Louisville's 1933 season was part of a 24-game losing streak dating back to October 2, 1931. The streak ended on November 18 with a 13–7 victory over Eastern Kentucky.

== Schedule ==
Date	Time	Opponent	Site	Result	Attendance	Source
September 30	2:15 p.m.	Centre	Parkway Field; Louisville, KY	L 0–30	8,000	
October 6		at Georgetown (KY)	Georgetown, KY	L 0–13		
October 13		at Union (KY)	Barbourville, KY	L 0–19		
October 21		Western Kentucky State Teachers^{†}	Parkway Field; Louisville, KY	L 0–45		
October 28		at Morehead State*	Morehead, KY	L 0–13		
November 4		Murray State	Parkway Field; Louisville, KY	L 6–54		
November 11		at Miami (FL)	Moore Park; Miami, FL (rivalry)	L 7–33		
November 18		Eastern Kentucky	Parkway Field; Louisville, KY	W 13–7		
*Non-conference game; ^{†}Homecoming; All times are in Central time
