= 1933 Southwestern Louisiana Bulldogs football team =

American college football season

1933 Southwestern Louisiana Bulldogs football
- Conference: Southern Intercollegiate Athletic Association
- Record: 6–3 (3–2 SIAA)
- Head coach: Truman F. Wilbanks (3rd season)
- Home stadium: Campus Athletic Field

1933 Southern Intercollegiate Athletic Association football standings
	Conf.					Overall
Team	W		L		T	W		L		T
Murray State $	7	–	0	–	0	9	–	0	–	0
Howard (AL)	5	–	0	–	0	7	–	1	–	2
Centenary	3	–	0	–	0	8	–	0	–	4
Furman	4	–	0	–	1	6	–	1	–	2
Union (KY)	3	–	0	–	1	4	–	1	–	1
Miami (FL)	2	–	0	–	1	5	–	1	–	2
Western Kentucky State Teachers	5	–	1	–	0	6	–	2	–	0
Centre	3	–	1	–	0	7	–	3	–	0
Loyola (LA)	3	–	1	–	0	6	–	4	–	1
Rollins	2	–	1	–	0	6	–	2	–	0
SW Louisiana	3	–	2	–	0	6	–	3	–	0
Presbyterian	3	–	2	–	0	4	–	2	–	2
Millsaps	3	–	2	–	1	4	–	4	–	2
Newberry	2	–	2	–	1	6	–	3	–	1
Tennessee Tech	2	–	2	–	0	4	–	4	–	0
The Citadel	2	–	2	–	1	3	–	5	–	1
Louisiana Normal	2	–	3	–	0	6	–	3	–	0
Mississippi College	2	–	3	–	0	3	–	4	–	1
Georgetown (KY)	2	–	3	–	1	2	–	5	–	1
Mississippi State Teachers	2	–	4	–	1	3	–	5	–	2
Southwestern (TN)	1	–	2	–	0	3	–	4	–	2
Louisiana Tech	1	–	3	–	0	1	–	7	–	0
Louisiana College	1	–	4	–	0	3	–	4	–	0
Wofford	1	–	4	–	0	3	–	6	–	0
Transylvania	1	–	4	–	0	1	–	7	–	1
Erskine	1	–	5	–	0	2	–	7	–	0
Union (TN)	1	–	5	–	0	3	–	7	–	0
Louisville	1	–	6	–	0	1	–	7	–	0
Mercer	0	–	0	–	1	4	–	3	–	2
Stetson	0	–	0	–	1	3	–	3	–	1
Eastern Kentucky State Teachers	0	–	2	–	2	1	–	2	–	3
Middle Tennessee State Teachers	0	–	4	–	0	1	–	7	–	1
$ – Conference champion

The 1933 Southwestern Louisiana Bulldogs football team was an American football team that represented the Southwestern Louisiana Institute of Liberal and Technical Learning (now known as the University of Louisiana at Lafayette) in the Southern Intercollegiate Athletic Association during the 1933 college football season. In their third year under head coach Truman F. Wilbanks, the team compiled a 6–3 record.

== Schedule ==
Date	Opponent	Site	Result	Source
September 22	Southeastern Louisiana*	Campus Athletic Field; Lafayette, LA (rivalry)	W 34–0	
September 29	at Loyola (LA)	Loyola University Stadium; New Orleans, LA	L 0–12	
October 6	Lamar*	Campus Athletic Field; Lafayette, LA (rivalry)	L 7–8	
October 14	at Louisiana Tech	Tech Stadium; Ruston, LA (rivalry)	W 13–7	
October 21	at Mississippi State Teachers	Faulkner Field; Hattiesburg, MS	L 0–6	
October 27	Spring Hill*	Campus Athletic Field; Lafayette, LA	W 21–0	
November 11	Louisiana College	Campus Athletic Field; Lafayette, LA	W 26–0	
November 17	at Stephen F. Austin*	Birdwell Field; Nacogdoches, TX	W 17–0	
November 30	at Louisiana Normal	Demon Stadium; Natchitoches, LA	W 10–2	
*Non-conference game
