= 1933 Mississippi College Choctaws football team =

American college football season

1933 Mississippi College Choctaws football
- Conference: Dixie Conference, Southern Intercollegiate Athletic Association
- Record: 3–4–1 (1–1–1 Dixie, 2–3 SIAA)
- Head coach: Stanley L. Robinson (9th season)
- Home stadium: Provine Field; Municipal Stadium

1933 Dixie Conference football standings
	Conf.					Overall
Team	W		L		T	W		L		T
Howard (AL) $	4	–	0	–	1	7	–	1	–	2
Centre	2	–	0	–	0	7	–	3	–	0
Mercer	2	–	0	–	1	4	–	3	–	2
Birmingham–Southern	2	–	1	–	3	3	–	3	–	3
Mississippi College	1	–	1	–	1	3	–	4	–	1
Millsaps	1	–	1	–	1	4	–	4	–	2
Southwestern (TN)	1	–	3	–	1	3	–	4	–	2
Chattanooga	0	–	2	–	2	2	–	3	–	2
Spring Hill	0	–	5	–	0	0	–	7	–	1
$ – Conference champion

1933 Southern Intercollegiate Athletic Association football standings
	Conf.					Overall
Team	W		L		T	W		L		T
Murray State $	7	–	0	–	0	9	–	0	–	0
Howard (AL)	5	–	0	–	0	7	–	1	–	2
Centenary	3	–	0	–	0	8	–	0	–	4
Furman	4	–	0	–	1	6	–	1	–	2
Union (KY)	3	–	0	–	1	4	–	1	–	1
Miami (FL)	2	–	0	–	1	5	–	1	–	2
Western Kentucky State Teachers	5	–	1	–	0	6	–	2	–	0
Centre	3	–	1	–	0	7	–	3	–	0
Loyola (LA)	3	–	1	–	0	6	–	4	–	1
Rollins	2	–	1	–	0	6	–	2	–	0
SW Louisiana	3	–	2	–	0	6	–	3	–	0
Presbyterian	3	–	2	–	0	4	–	2	–	2
Millsaps	3	–	2	–	1	4	–	4	–	2
Newberry	2	–	2	–	1	6	–	3	–	1
Tennessee Tech	2	–	2	–	0	4	–	4	–	0
The Citadel	2	–	2	–	1	3	–	5	–	1
Louisiana Normal	2	–	3	–	0	6	–	3	–	0
Mississippi College	2	–	3	–	0	3	–	4	–	1
Georgetown (KY)	2	–	3	–	1	2	–	5	–	1
Mississippi State Teachers	2	–	4	–	1	3	–	5	–	2
Southwestern (TN)	1	–	2	–	0	3	–	4	–	2
Louisiana Tech	1	–	3	–	0	1	–	7	–	0
Louisiana College	1	–	4	–	0	3	–	4	–	0
Wofford	1	–	4	–	0	3	–	6	–	0
Transylvania	1	–	4	–	0	1	–	7	–	1
Erskine	1	–	5	–	0	2	–	7	–	0
Union (TN)	1	–	5	–	0	3	–	7	–	0
Louisville	1	–	6	–	0	1	–	7	–	0
Mercer	0	–	0	–	1	4	–	3	–	2
Stetson	0	–	0	–	1	3	–	3	–	1
Eastern Kentucky State Teachers	0	–	2	–	2	1	–	2	–	3
Middle Tennessee State Teachers	0	–	4	–	0	1	–	7	–	1
$ – Conference champion

The 1933 Mississippi College Choctaws football team was an American football team that represented Mississippi College as a member of the Dixie Conference and the Southern Intercollegiate Athletic Association (SIAA) in the 1933 college football season. Led by Stanley L. Robinson in his ninth season as head coach, the team compiled an overall record of 3–4–1 and with a mark of 1–1–1 in Dixie Conference play and 2–3 against SIAA competition.

== Schedule ==
The Choctaws were originally scheduled to open their season on September 23 against the National Autonomous University of Mexico at the Century of Progress exposition in Chicago, but the game was cancelled by exposition officials. In a formal statement, Mississippi College athletic director Stanley L. Robinson said: "Mississippi college fears that neglect of exposition authorities in this matter will have a tendency to injure the cordial relations which have existed between the two schools for the past several years."

Date	Opponent	Site	Result	Attendance	Source
September 30	Louisiana College	Provine Field; Clinton, MS	W 33–7		
October 7	Mississippi State Teachers	Provine Field; Clinton, MS	W 33–7		
October 13	Spring Hill	State Fair Grounds; Jackson, MS	W 14–8	2,500	
October 28	at Chattanooga	Chamberlain Field; Chattanooga, TN	T 0–0		
November 3	at Mississippi State*	Scott Field; Starkville, MS	L 0–18		
November 10	at Loyola (LA)	Loyola Stadium; New Orleans, LA	L 0–38	6,000	
November 18	vs. Howard (AL)	Vicksburg Fairgrounds; Vicksburg, MS	L 0–20		
November 30	Millsaps	Municipal Stadium; Jackson, MS (rivalry)	L 0–2	5,000	
*Non-conference game
