= 1933 Mercer Bears football team =

American college football season

1933 Mercer Bears football
- Conference: Dixie Conference, Southern Intercollegiate Athletic Association
- Record: 4–3–2 (2–0–1 Dixie, 0–0–1 SIAA)
- Head coach: Lake Russell (5th season)
- Home stadium: Centennial Stadium

1933 Dixie Conference football standings
	Conf.					Overall
Team	W		L		T	W		L		T
Howard (AL) $	4	–	0	–	1	7	–	1	–	2
Centre	2	–	0	–	0	7	–	3	–	0
Mercer	2	–	0	–	1	4	–	3	–	2
Birmingham–Southern	2	–	1	–	3	3	–	3	–	3
Mississippi College	1	–	1	–	1	3	–	4	–	1
Millsaps	1	–	1	–	1	4	–	4	–	2
Southwestern (TN)	1	–	3	–	1	3	–	4	–	2
Chattanooga	0	–	2	–	2	2	–	3	–	2
Spring Hill	0	–	5	–	0	0	–	7	–	1
$ – Conference champion

1933 Southern Intercollegiate Athletic Association football standings
	Conf.					Overall
Team	W		L		T	W		L		T
Murray State $	7	–	0	–	0	9	–	0	–	0
Howard (AL)	5	–	0	–	0	7	–	1	–	2
Centenary	3	–	0	–	0	8	–	0	–	4
Furman	4	–	0	–	1	6	–	1	–	2
Union (KY)	3	–	0	–	1	4	–	1	–	1
Miami (FL)	2	–	0	–	1	5	–	1	–	2
Western Kentucky State Teachers	5	–	1	–	0	6	–	2	–	0
Centre	3	–	1	–	0	7	–	3	–	0
Loyola (LA)	3	–	1	–	0	6	–	4	–	1
Rollins	2	–	1	–	0	6	–	2	–	0
SW Louisiana	3	–	2	–	0	6	–	3	–	0
Presbyterian	3	–	2	–	0	4	–	2	–	2
Millsaps	3	–	2	–	1	4	–	4	–	2
Newberry	2	–	2	–	1	6	–	3	–	1
Tennessee Tech	2	–	2	–	0	4	–	4	–	0
The Citadel	2	–	2	–	1	3	–	5	–	1
Louisiana Normal	2	–	3	–	0	6	–	3	–	0
Mississippi College	2	–	3	–	0	3	–	4	–	1
Georgetown (KY)	2	–	3	–	1	2	–	5	–	1
Mississippi State Teachers	2	–	4	–	1	3	–	5	–	2
Southwestern (TN)	1	–	2	–	0	3	–	4	–	2
Louisiana Tech	1	–	3	–	0	1	–	7	–	0
Louisiana College	1	–	4	–	0	3	–	4	–	0
Wofford	1	–	4	–	0	3	–	6	–	0
Transylvania	1	–	4	–	0	1	–	7	–	1
Erskine	1	–	5	–	0	2	–	7	–	0
Union (TN)	1	–	5	–	0	3	–	7	–	0
Louisville	1	–	6	–	0	1	–	7	–	0
Mercer	0	–	0	–	1	4	–	3	–	2
Stetson	0	–	0	–	1	3	–	3	–	1
Eastern Kentucky State Teachers	0	–	2	–	2	1	–	2	–	3
Middle Tennessee State Teachers	0	–	4	–	0	1	–	7	–	1
$ – Conference champion

The 1933 Mercer Bears football team was an American football team that represented Mercer University as a member of both the Dixie Conference and the Southern Intercollegiate Athletic Association (SIAA) during the 1933 college football season. In their fifth year under head coach Lake Russell, the team compiled a 4–3–2 record.

== Schedule ==
Date	Opponent	Site	Result	Attendance	Source
September 23	Spring Hill	Centennial Stadium; Macon, GA	W 44–3	3,500	
September 30	at Army*	Michie Stadium; West Point, NY	L 6–19		
October 7	at Navy*	Thompson Stadium; Annapolis, MD	L 6–25	13,000	
October 14	at Birmingham–Southern	Legion Field; Birmingham, AL	T 0–0		
October 20	Georgia*	Centennial Stadium; Macon, GA	L 12–13	12,000	
October 28	at Furman	Manly Field; Greenville, SC	T 6–6	6,000	
November 11	at Chattanooga	Chamberlain Field; Chattanooga, TN	W 7–0	3,000	
November 18	vs. Clemson*	Municipal Stadium; Savannah, GA	W 13–0	6,000	
December 2	Oglethorpe*	Centennial Stadium; Macon, GA	W 31–0		
*Non-conference game
