= 1933 Furman Purple Hurricane football team =

American college football season

1933 Furman Purple Hurricane football
- Conference: Southern Intercollegiate Athletic Association
- Record: 6–1–2 (4–0–1 SIAA)
- Head coach: Dizzy McLeod (2nd season)
- Captain: Bob Smith
- Home stadium: Manly Field

1933 Southern Intercollegiate Athletic Association football standings
	Conf.					Overall
Team	W		L		T	W		L		T
Murray State $	7	–	0	–	0	9	–	0	–	0
Howard (AL)	5	–	0	–	0	7	–	1	–	2
Centenary	3	–	0	–	0	8	–	0	–	4
Furman	4	–	0	–	1	6	–	1	–	2
Union (KY)	3	–	0	–	1	4	–	1	–	1
Miami (FL)	2	–	0	–	1	5	–	1	–	2
Western Kentucky State Teachers	5	–	1	–	0	6	–	2	–	0
Centre	3	–	1	–	0	7	–	3	–	0
Loyola (LA)	3	–	1	–	0	6	–	4	–	1
Rollins	2	–	1	–	0	6	–	2	–	0
SW Louisiana	3	–	2	–	0	6	–	3	–	0
Presbyterian	3	–	2	–	0	4	–	2	–	2
Millsaps	3	–	2	–	1	4	–	4	–	2
Newberry	2	–	2	–	1	6	–	3	–	1
Tennessee Tech	2	–	2	–	0	4	–	4	–	0
The Citadel	2	–	2	–	1	3	–	5	–	1
Louisiana Normal	2	–	3	–	0	6	–	3	–	0
Mississippi College	2	–	3	–	0	3	–	4	–	1
Georgetown (KY)	2	–	3	–	1	2	–	5	–	1
Mississippi State Teachers	2	–	4	–	1	3	–	5	–	2
Southwestern (TN)	1	–	2	–	0	3	–	4	–	2
Louisiana Tech	1	–	3	–	0	1	–	7	–	0
Louisiana College	1	–	4	–	0	3	–	4	–	0
Wofford	1	–	4	–	0	3	–	6	–	0
Transylvania	1	–	4	–	0	1	–	7	–	1
Erskine	1	–	5	–	0	2	–	7	–	0
Union (TN)	1	–	5	–	0	3	–	7	–	0
Louisville	1	–	6	–	0	1	–	7	–	0
Mercer	0	–	0	–	1	4	–	3	–	2
Stetson	0	–	0	–	1	3	–	3	–	1
Eastern Kentucky State Teachers	0	–	2	–	2	1	–	2	–	3
Middle Tennessee State Teachers	0	–	4	–	0	1	–	7	–	1
$ – Conference champion

The 1933 Furman Purple Hurricane football team represented Furman University as a member of the Southern Intercollegiate Athletic Association (SIAA) during the 1933 college football season. Led by second-year head coach Dizzy McLeod, the Purple Hurricane compiled an overall record of 6–1–2, with a mark of 4–0–1 in conference play, and finished fourth in the SIAA.

== Schedule ==
Date	Time	Opponent	Site	Result	Attendance	Source
September 30		at Richmond*	City Stadium; Richmond, VA	W 14–6	3,000	
October 6		Erskine	Manly Field; Greenville, SC	W 33–0		
October 14		The Citadel	Manly Field; Greenville, SC (rivalry)	W 14–0	4,000	
October 21	3:15 p.m.	at Centre	Cheek Field; Danville, KY	W 7–6		
October 28		Mercer	Manly Field; Greenville, SC	T 6–6	6,000	
November 4		Wofford	Manly Field; Greenville, SC (rivalry)	W 38–0		
November 11		at Bucknell*	Memorial Stadium; Lewisburg, PA	L 0–12		
November 18		South Carolina*	State Fairgrounds; Columbia, SC	T 0–0	12,000	
November 30		Clemson*	Manly Field; Greenville, SC	W 6–0	13,000	
*Non-conference game; All times are in Eastern time
