= 1933 Louisiana Tech Bulldogs football team =

American college football season

1933 Louisiana Tech Bulldogs football
- Conference: Southern Intercollegiate Athletic Association
- Record: 1–7 (1–3 SIAA)
- Head coach: George Bohler (4th season)
- Captain: Jimmy Davis
- Home stadium: Tech Stadium

1933 Southern Intercollegiate Athletic Association football standings
	Conf.					Overall
Team	W		L		T	W		L		T
Murray State $	7	–	0	–	0	9	–	0	–	0
Howard (AL)	5	–	0	–	0	7	–	1	–	2
Centenary	3	–	0	–	0	8	–	0	–	4
Furman	4	–	0	–	1	6	–	1	–	2
Union (KY)	3	–	0	–	1	4	–	1	–	1
Miami (FL)	2	–	0	–	1	5	–	1	–	2
Western Kentucky State Teachers	5	–	1	–	0	6	–	2	–	0
Centre	3	–	1	–	0	7	–	3	–	0
Loyola (LA)	3	–	1	–	0	6	–	4	–	1
Rollins	2	–	1	–	0	6	–	2	–	0
SW Louisiana	3	–	2	–	0	6	–	3	–	0
Presbyterian	3	–	2	–	0	4	–	2	–	2
Millsaps	3	–	2	–	1	4	–	4	–	2
Newberry	2	–	2	–	1	6	–	3	–	1
Tennessee Tech	2	–	2	–	0	4	–	4	–	0
The Citadel	2	–	2	–	1	3	–	5	–	1
Louisiana Normal	2	–	3	–	0	6	–	3	–	0
Mississippi College	2	–	3	–	0	3	–	4	–	1
Georgetown (KY)	2	–	3	–	1	2	–	5	–	1
Mississippi State Teachers	2	–	4	–	1	3	–	5	–	2
Southwestern (TN)	1	–	2	–	0	3	–	4	–	2
Louisiana Tech	1	–	3	–	0	1	–	7	–	0
Louisiana College	1	–	4	–	0	3	–	4	–	0
Wofford	1	–	4	–	0	3	–	6	–	0
Transylvania	1	–	4	–	0	1	–	7	–	1
Erskine	1	–	5	–	0	2	–	7	–	0
Union (TN)	1	–	5	–	0	3	–	7	–	0
Louisville	1	–	6	–	0	1	–	7	–	0
Mercer	0	–	0	–	1	4	–	3	–	2
Stetson	0	–	0	–	1	3	–	3	–	1
Eastern Kentucky State Teachers	0	–	2	–	2	1	–	2	–	3
Middle Tennessee State Teachers	0	–	4	–	0	1	–	7	–	1
$ – Conference champion

The 1933 Louisiana Tech Bulldogs football team was an American football team that represented the Polytechnic Institute of University of Louisiana (now known as Louisiana Tech University) as a member of the Southern Intercollegiate Athletic Association during the 1933 college football season. In their fourth year under head coach George Bohler, the team compiled a 1–7 record.

== Schedule ==
Date	Opponent	Site	Result	Source
September 30	Copiah–Lincoln*	Tech Stadium; Ruston, LA	L 9–10	
October 7	Henderson State*	Tech Stadium; Ruston, LA	L 0–7	
October 14	Southwestern Louisiana^{†}	Tech Stadium; Ruston, LA (rivalry)	L 7–13	
October 20	at Texas Tech*	Tech Field; Lubbock, TX	L 10–40	
October 28	Louisiana Normal	Tech Stadium; Ruston, LA (rivalry)	W 6–0	
November 4	at Millsaps	Millsaps Field; Jackson, MS	L 0–3	
November 11	Ozarks (AR)*	Tech Stadium; Ruston, LA	L 0–40	
November 18	at Louisiana College	Alumni Field; Pineville, LA	L 0–30	
*Non-conference game; ^{†}Homecoming
