= 1933 The Citadel Bulldogs football team =

American college football season

1933 The Citadel Bulldogs football
- Conference: Southern Intercollegiate Athletic Association
- Record: 3–5–1 (2–2–1 SIAA)
- Head coach: Tatum Gressette (2nd season)
- Home stadium: Johnson Hagood Stadium

1933 Southern Intercollegiate Athletic Association football standings
	Conf.					Overall
Team	W		L		T	W		L		T
Murray State $	7	–	0	–	0	9	–	0	–	0
Howard (AL)	5	–	0	–	0	7	–	1	–	2
Centenary	3	–	0	–	0	8	–	0	–	4
Furman	4	–	0	–	1	6	–	1	–	2
Union (KY)	3	–	0	–	1	4	–	1	–	1
Miami (FL)	2	–	0	–	1	5	–	1	–	2
Western Kentucky State Teachers	5	–	1	–	0	6	–	2	–	0
Centre	3	–	1	–	0	7	–	3	–	0
Loyola (LA)	3	–	1	–	0	6	–	4	–	1
Rollins	2	–	1	–	0	6	–	2	–	0
SW Louisiana	3	–	2	–	0	6	–	3	–	0
Presbyterian	3	–	2	–	0	4	–	2	–	2
Millsaps	3	–	2	–	1	4	–	4	–	2
Newberry	2	–	2	–	1	6	–	3	–	1
Tennessee Tech	2	–	2	–	0	4	–	4	–	0
The Citadel	2	–	2	–	1	3	–	5	–	1
Louisiana Normal	2	–	3	–	0	6	–	3	–	0
Mississippi College	2	–	3	–	0	3	–	4	–	1
Georgetown (KY)	2	–	3	–	1	2	–	5	–	1
Mississippi State Teachers	2	–	4	–	1	3	–	5	–	2
Southwestern (TN)	1	–	2	–	0	3	–	4	–	2
Louisiana Tech	1	–	3	–	0	1	–	7	–	0
Louisiana College	1	–	4	–	0	3	–	4	–	0
Wofford	1	–	4	–	0	3	–	6	–	0
Transylvania	1	–	4	–	0	1	–	7	–	1
Erskine	1	–	5	–	0	2	–	7	–	0
Union (TN)	1	–	5	–	0	3	–	7	–	0
Louisville	1	–	6	–	0	1	–	7	–	0
Mercer	0	–	0	–	1	4	–	3	–	2
Stetson	0	–	0	–	1	3	–	3	–	1
Eastern Kentucky State Teachers	0	–	2	–	2	1	–	2	–	3
Middle Tennessee State Teachers	0	–	4	–	0	1	–	7	–	1
$ – Conference champion

The 1933 The Citadel Bulldogs football team represented The Citadel, The Military College of South Carolina as member of the Southern Intercollegiate Athletic Association (SIAA) in the 1933 college football season. Tatum Gressette served as head coach for the second season. The Bulldogs played home games at Johnson Hagood Stadium.

== Schedule ==
Date	Opponent	Site	Result	Attendance	Source
September 29	vs. Erskine	Memorial Field; Anderson, SC	W 25–0	2,500	
October 7	Newberry	Johnson Hagood Stadium; Charleston, SC	T 7–7		
October 14	at Furman	Manly Field; Greenville, SC (rivalry)	L 0–14	4,000	
October 26	vs. South Carolina*	County Fairgrounds; Orangeburg, SC	L 6–12	5,000	
November 4	Presbyterian^{†}	Johnson Hagood Stadium; Charleston, SC	L 6–7	5,000	
November 11	at Davidson*	Richardson Field; Davidson, NC	L 6–24		
November 18	vs. Oglethorpe*	Augusta, GA	W 13–0	5,000	
November 25	at Clemson*	Riggs Field; Calhoun, SC	L 0–7		
November 30	Wofford	Johnson Hagood Stadium; Charleston, SC (rivalry)	W 14–0		
*Non-conference game; ^{†}Homecoming
