= 1933 Centenary Gentlemen football team =

American college football season

1933 Centenary Gentlemen football

Dixie Classic, T 7–7 vs. Arkansas
- Conference: Southern Intercollegiate Athletic Association
- Record: 8–0–4 (3–0 SIAA)
- Head coach: Homer Norton (8th season)

1933 Southern Intercollegiate Athletic Association football standings
	Conf.					Overall
Team	W		L		T	W		L		T
Murray State $	7	–	0	–	0	9	–	0	–	0
Howard (AL)	5	–	0	–	0	7	–	1	–	2
Centenary	3	–	0	–	0	8	–	0	–	4
Furman	4	–	0	–	1	6	–	1	–	2
Union (KY)	3	–	0	–	1	4	–	1	–	1
Miami (FL)	2	–	0	–	1	5	–	1	–	2
Western Kentucky State Teachers	5	–	1	–	0	6	–	2	–	0
Centre	3	–	1	–	0	7	–	3	–	0
Loyola (LA)	3	–	1	–	0	6	–	4	–	1
Rollins	2	–	1	–	0	6	–	2	–	0
SW Louisiana	3	–	2	–	0	6	–	3	–	0
Presbyterian	3	–	2	–	0	4	–	2	–	2
Millsaps	3	–	2	–	1	4	–	4	–	2
Newberry	2	–	2	–	1	6	–	3	–	1
Tennessee Tech	2	–	2	–	0	4	–	4	–	0
The Citadel	2	–	2	–	1	3	–	5	–	1
Louisiana Normal	2	–	3	–	0	6	–	3	–	0
Mississippi College	2	–	3	–	0	3	–	4	–	1
Georgetown (KY)	2	–	3	–	1	2	–	5	–	1
Mississippi State Teachers	2	–	4	–	1	3	–	5	–	2
Southwestern (TN)	1	–	2	–	0	3	–	4	–	2
Louisiana Tech	1	–	3	–	0	1	–	7	–	0
Louisiana College	1	–	4	–	0	3	–	4	–	0
Wofford	1	–	4	–	0	3	–	6	–	0
Transylvania	1	–	4	–	0	1	–	7	–	1
Erskine	1	–	5	–	0	2	–	7	–	0
Union (TN)	1	–	5	–	0	3	–	7	–	0
Louisville	1	–	6	–	0	1	–	7	–	0
Mercer	0	–	0	–	1	4	–	3	–	2
Stetson	0	–	0	–	1	3	–	3	–	1
Eastern Kentucky State Teachers	0	–	2	–	2	1	–	2	–	3
Middle Tennessee State Teachers	0	–	4	–	0	1	–	7	–	1
$ – Conference champion

The 1933 Centenary Gentlemen football team represented the Centenary College of Louisiana during the 1933 college football season. Paul Geisler was a consensus All-American.

== Schedule ==
Date	Opponent	Site	Result	Attendance	Source
September 23	Louisiana Normal	Centenary College Stadium; Shreveport, LA	W 18–0	4,000	
September 30	Henderson State*	Centenary College Stadium; Shreveport, LA	W 27–0	3,500	
October 7	Baylor*	Centenary College Stadium; Shreveport, LA	W 19–0	5,000	
October 14	at LSU*	Tiger Stadium; Baton Rouge, LA	T 0–0	18,000	
October 21	vs. Texas*	Eagle Field; San Antonio, TX	T 0–0	10,000	
October 28	TCU*	State Fair Stadium; Shreveport, LA	T 0–0	7,000	
November 4	Texas A&M*	Centenary College Stadium; Shreveport, LA	W 20–0		
November 11	Union (TN)	Centenary College Stadium; Shreveport, LA	W 47–0		
November 18	SMU*	Centenary College Stadium; Shreveport, LA	W 7–0		
November 25	at Ole Miss*	Municipal Stadium; Jackson, MS	W 7–6		
November 30	at Loyola (LA)*	Loyola University Stadium; New Orleans, LA	W 28–12		
January 1	vs. Arkansas	Fair Park; Dallas, TX (Dixie Classic)	T 7–7	8,000	
*Non-conference game
