= 1933 Howard Bulldogs football team =

American college football season

1933 Howard Bulldogs football

Dixie champion
- Conference: Dixie Conference, Southern Intercollegiate Athletic Association
- Record: 7–1–2 (4–0–1 Dixie, 5–0 SIAA)
- Head coach: Eddie McLane (5th season)
- Home stadium: Legion Field

1933 Dixie Conference football standings
	Conf.					Overall
Team	W		L		T	W		L		T
Howard (AL) $	4	–	0	–	1	7	–	1	–	2
Centre	2	–	0	–	0	7	–	3	–	0
Mercer	2	–	0	–	1	4	–	3	–	2
Birmingham–Southern	2	–	1	–	3	3	–	3	–	3
Mississippi College	1	–	1	–	1	3	–	4	–	1
Millsaps	1	–	1	–	1	4	–	4	–	2
Southwestern (TN)	1	–	3	–	1	3	–	4	–	2
Chattanooga	0	–	2	–	2	2	–	3	–	2
Spring Hill	0	–	5	–	0	0	–	7	–	1
$ – Conference champion

1933 Southern Intercollegiate Athletic Association football standings
	Conf.					Overall
Team	W		L		T	W		L		T
Murray State $	7	–	0	–	0	9	–	0	–	0
Howard (AL)	5	–	0	–	0	7	–	1	–	2
Centenary	3	–	0	–	0	8	–	0	–	4
Furman	4	–	0	–	1	6	–	1	–	2
Union (KY)	3	–	0	–	1	4	–	1	–	1
Miami (FL)	2	–	0	–	1	5	–	1	–	2
Western Kentucky State Teachers	5	–	1	–	0	6	–	2	–	0
Centre	3	–	1	–	0	7	–	3	–	0
Loyola (LA)	3	–	1	–	0	6	–	4	–	1
Rollins	2	–	1	–	0	6	–	2	–	0
SW Louisiana	3	–	2	–	0	6	–	3	–	0
Presbyterian	3	–	2	–	0	4	–	2	–	2
Millsaps	3	–	2	–	1	4	–	4	–	2
Newberry	2	–	2	–	1	6	–	3	–	1
Tennessee Tech	2	–	2	–	0	4	–	4	–	0
The Citadel	2	–	2	–	1	3	–	5	–	1
Louisiana Normal	2	–	3	–	0	6	–	3	–	0
Mississippi College	2	–	3	–	0	3	–	4	–	1
Georgetown (KY)	2	–	3	–	1	2	–	5	–	1
Mississippi State Teachers	2	–	4	–	1	3	–	5	–	2
Southwestern (TN)	1	–	2	–	0	3	–	4	–	2
Louisiana Tech	1	–	3	–	0	1	–	7	–	0
Louisiana College	1	–	4	–	0	3	–	4	–	0
Wofford	1	–	4	–	0	3	–	6	–	0
Transylvania	1	–	4	–	0	1	–	7	–	1
Erskine	1	–	5	–	0	2	–	7	–	0
Union (TN)	1	–	5	–	0	3	–	7	–	0
Louisville	1	–	6	–	0	1	–	7	–	0
Mercer	0	–	0	–	1	4	–	3	–	2
Stetson	0	–	0	–	1	3	–	3	–	1
Eastern Kentucky State Teachers	0	–	2	–	2	1	–	2	–	3
Middle Tennessee State Teachers	0	–	4	–	0	1	–	7	–	1
$ – Conference champion

The 1933 Howard Bulldogs football team represented Howard College as a member of the Dixie Conference and the Southern Intercollegiate Athletic Association (SIAA) in the 1933 college football season. Led by fifth-year head coach Eddie McLane, the team comped an overall record of 7–1–2 and won the Dixie Conference title with a mark of 4–0–1.

== Schedule ==
Date	Time	Opponent	Site	Result	Attendance	Source
September 22		Jacksonville State*	Legion Field; Birmingham, AL	W 31–0		
September 29		Auburn*	Legion Field; Birmingham, AL	L 19–0		
October 6		at Presbyterian	Bailey Stadium; Clinton, SC	W 13–0		
October 13		Union (TN)	Legion Field; Birmingham, AL	W 51–0		
October 21		Southwestern (TN)	Legion Field; Birmingham, AL	W 26–7		
October 28		Millsaps	Legion Field; Birmingham, AL	W 27–7		
November 11		Spring Hill	Legion Field; Birmingham, AL	W 50–0		
November 18		vs. Mississippi College	Vicksburg Fairgrounds; Vicksburg, MS	W 20–0	3,500	
November 30		Birmingham–Southern	Legion Field; Birmingham, AL	T 7–7	20,000	
December 9	3:00 p.m.	at Tampa*	Plant Field; Tampa, FL	T 6–6		
*Non-conference game
