= 1933 Miami Hurricanes football team =

American college football season

1933 Miami Hurricanes football

Festival of Palms Bowl, L 7–33 vs. Duquesne
- Conference: Southern Intercollegiate Athletic Association
- Record: 5–1–2 (2–0–1 SIAA)
- Head coach: Tom McCann (2nd season)
- Home stadium: Moore Park

1933 Southern Intercollegiate Athletic Association football standings
	Conf.					Overall
Team	W		L		T	W		L		T
Murray State $	7	–	0	–	0	9	–	0	–	0
Howard (AL)	5	–	0	–	0	7	–	1	–	2
Centenary	3	–	0	–	0	8	–	0	–	4
Furman	4	–	0	–	1	6	–	1	–	2
Union (KY)	3	–	0	–	1	4	–	1	–	1
Miami (FL)	2	–	0	–	1	5	–	1	–	2
Western Kentucky State Teachers	5	–	1	–	0	6	–	2	–	0
Centre	3	–	1	–	0	7	–	3	–	0
Loyola (LA)	3	–	1	–	0	6	–	4	–	1
Rollins	2	–	1	–	0	6	–	2	–	0
SW Louisiana	3	–	2	–	0	6	–	3	–	0
Presbyterian	3	–	2	–	0	4	–	2	–	2
Millsaps	3	–	2	–	1	4	–	4	–	2
Newberry	2	–	2	–	1	6	–	3	–	1
Tennessee Tech	2	–	2	–	0	4	–	4	–	0
The Citadel	2	–	2	–	1	3	–	5	–	1
Louisiana Normal	2	–	3	–	0	6	–	3	–	0
Mississippi College	2	–	3	–	0	3	–	4	–	1
Georgetown (KY)	2	–	3	–	1	2	–	5	–	1
Mississippi State Teachers	2	–	4	–	1	3	–	5	–	2
Southwestern (TN)	1	–	2	–	0	3	–	4	–	2
Louisiana Tech	1	–	3	–	0	1	–	7	–	0
Louisiana College	1	–	4	–	0	3	–	4	–	0
Wofford	1	–	4	–	0	3	–	6	–	0
Transylvania	1	–	4	–	0	1	–	7	–	1
Erskine	1	–	5	–	0	2	–	7	–	0
Union (TN)	1	–	5	–	0	3	–	7	–	0
Louisville	1	–	6	–	0	1	–	7	–	0
Mercer	0	–	0	–	1	4	–	3	–	2
Stetson	0	–	0	–	1	3	–	3	–	1
Eastern Kentucky State Teachers	0	–	2	–	2	1	–	2	–	3
Middle Tennessee State Teachers	0	–	4	–	0	1	–	7	–	1
$ – Conference champion

The 1933 Miami Hurricanes football team represented the University of Miami as a member of the Southern Intercollegiate Athletic Association (SIAA) in the 1933 college football season. The Hurricanes played their home games at Moore Park in Miami, Florida. Led by third-year head coach Tom McCann, The Hurricanes finished their season 5–1–2 and were invited to the second annual edition of the Festival of Palms Bowl, where they lost to the Duquesne by a score of 33–7.

== Schedule ==
Date	Opponent	Site	Result	Attendance	Source
October 20	South Georgia*	Moore Park; Miami, FL	W 20–0		
October 27	Piedmont*	Moore Park; Miami, FL	W 71–6		
November 3	Bowdon College*	Moore Park; Miami, FL	W 48–0		
November 11	Louisville	Moore Park; Miami, FL (rivalry)	W 33–7		
November 17	Rollins	Moore Park; Miami, FL	W 18–0		
December 3	Stetson	Moore Park; Miami, FL	T 0–0		
December 15	Tampa*	Moore Park; Miami, FL	T 0–0		
January 1	Duquesne*	Moore Park; Miami, FL (Festival of Palms Bowl)	L 7–33	10,000	
*Non-conference game
