= 1933 Middle Tennessee State Teachers football team =

American college football season

1933 Middle Tennessee State Teachers football
- Conference: Southern Intercollegiate Athletic Association
- Record: 1–7–1 (0–4 SIAA)
- Head coach: E. M. Waller (1st season)
- Captain: Brownlow Sharpe

1933 Southern Intercollegiate Athletic Association football standings
	Conf.					Overall
Team	W		L		T	W		L		T
Murray State $	7	–	0	–	0	9	–	0	–	0
Howard (AL)	5	–	0	–	0	7	–	1	–	2
Centenary	3	–	0	–	0	8	–	0	–	4
Furman	4	–	0	–	1	6	–	1	–	2
Union (KY)	3	–	0	–	1	4	–	1	–	1
Miami (FL)	2	–	0	–	1	5	–	1	–	2
Western Kentucky State Teachers	5	–	1	–	0	6	–	2	–	0
Centre	3	–	1	–	0	7	–	3	–	0
Loyola (LA)	3	–	1	–	0	6	–	4	–	1
Rollins	2	–	1	–	0	6	–	2	–	0
SW Louisiana	3	–	2	–	0	6	–	3	–	0
Presbyterian	3	–	2	–	0	4	–	2	–	2
Millsaps	3	–	2	–	1	4	–	4	–	2
Newberry	2	–	2	–	1	6	–	3	–	1
Tennessee Tech	2	–	2	–	0	4	–	4	–	0
The Citadel	2	–	2	–	1	3	–	5	–	1
Louisiana Normal	2	–	3	–	0	6	–	3	–	0
Mississippi College	2	–	3	–	0	3	–	4	–	1
Georgetown (KY)	2	–	3	–	1	2	–	5	–	1
Mississippi State Teachers	2	–	4	–	1	3	–	5	–	2
Southwestern (TN)	1	–	2	–	0	3	–	4	–	2
Louisiana Tech	1	–	3	–	0	1	–	7	–	0
Louisiana College	1	–	4	–	0	3	–	4	–	0
Wofford	1	–	4	–	0	3	–	6	–	0
Transylvania	1	–	4	–	0	1	–	7	–	1
Erskine	1	–	5	–	0	2	–	7	–	0
Union (TN)	1	–	5	–	0	3	–	7	–	0
Louisville	1	–	6	–	0	1	–	7	–	0
Mercer	0	–	0	–	1	4	–	3	–	2
Stetson	0	–	0	–	1	3	–	3	–	1
Eastern Kentucky State Teachers	0	–	2	–	2	1	–	2	–	3
Middle Tennessee State Teachers	0	–	4	–	0	1	–	7	–	1
$ – Conference champion

The 1933 Middle Tennessee State Teachers football team represented the Middle Tennessee State Teachers College (now known as Middle Tennessee State University) as a member of the Southern Intercollegiate Athletic Association (SIAA) during the 1933 college football season. Led by first-year head coach E. M. Waller, Middle Tennessee State Teachers compiled an overall record of 1–7–1 with a mark of 0–4 in conference play. The team's captain was Brownlow Sharpe.

== Schedule ==
Date	Opponent	Site	Result	Attendance	Source
September 30	at Western Kentucky State Teachers	Bowling Green, KY (rivalry)	L 0–32		
October 7	at Chattanooga*	Chamberlain Field; Chattanooga, TN	L 0–46	2,000	
October 14	Jacksonville State*	Murfreesboro, TN	T 0–0		
October 21	Maryville (TN)*	Murfreesboro, TN	W 25–0		
October 28	at Murray State	Cutchin Stadium; Murray, KY	L 7–70		
November 3	West Tennessee State Teachers*	Murfreesboro, TN	L 6–21		
November 11	Cumberland (TN)*	Murfreesboro, TN	L 6–12		
November 17	Union (TN)	Murfreesboro, TN	L 0–7		
November 30	at Tennessee Tech	Cookeville, TN	L 0–6		
*Non-conference game
