= 1933 Southwestern Lynx football team =

American college football season

1933 Southwestern Lynx football
- Conference: Dixie Conference, Southern Intercollegiate Athletic Association
- Record: 3–4–2 (1–3–1 Dixie, 1–2 SIAA)
- Head coach: Jimmy R. Haygood (3rd season)
- Home stadium: Fargason Field

1933 Dixie Conference football standings
| | Conf. | | | | | Overall |
| Team | W | | L | | T | W | | L | | T |
|---|---|---|---|---|---|---|---|---|---|---|
| Howard (AL) $ | 4 | – | 0 | – | 1 | 7 | – | 1 | – | 2 |
| Centre | 2 | – | 0 | – | 0 | 7 | – | 3 | – | 0 |
| Mercer | 2 | – | 0 | – | 1 | 4 | – | 3 | – | 2 |
| Birmingham–Southern | 2 | – | 1 | – | 3 | 3 | – | 3 | – | 3 |
| Mississippi College | 1 | – | 1 | – | 1 | 3 | – | 4 | – | 1 |
| Millsaps | 1 | – | 1 | – | 1 | 4 | – | 4 | – | 2 |
| Southwestern (TN) | 1 | – | 3 | – | 1 | 3 | – | 4 | – | 2 |
| Chattanooga | 0 | – | 2 | – | 2 | 2 | – | 3 | – | 2 |
| Spring Hill | 0 | – | 5 | – | 0 | 0 | – | 7 | – | 1 |
$ – Conference champion

1933 Southern Intercollegiate Athletic Association football standings
| | Conf. | | | | | Overall |
| Team | W | | L | | T | W | | L | | T |
|---|---|---|---|---|---|---|---|---|---|---|
| Murray State $ | 7 | – | 0 | – | 0 | 9 | – | 0 | – | 0 |
| Howard (AL) | 5 | – | 0 | – | 0 | 7 | – | 1 | – | 2 |
| Centenary | 3 | – | 0 | – | 0 | 8 | – | 0 | – | 4 |
| Furman | 4 | – | 0 | – | 1 | 6 | – | 1 | – | 2 |
| Union (KY) | 3 | – | 0 | – | 1 | 4 | – | 1 | – | 1 |
| Miami (FL) | 2 | – | 0 | – | 1 | 5 | – | 1 | – | 2 |
| Western Kentucky State Teachers | 5 | – | 1 | – | 0 | 6 | – | 2 | – | 0 |
| Centre | 3 | – | 1 | – | 0 | 7 | – | 3 | – | 0 |
| Loyola (LA) | 3 | – | 1 | – | 0 | 6 | – | 4 | – | 1 |
| Rollins | 2 | – | 1 | – | 0 | 6 | – | 2 | – | 0 |
| SW Louisiana | 3 | – | 2 | – | 0 | 6 | – | 3 | – | 0 |
| Presbyterian | 3 | – | 2 | – | 0 | 4 | – | 2 | – | 2 |
| Millsaps | 3 | – | 2 | – | 1 | 4 | – | 4 | – | 2 |
| Newberry | 2 | – | 2 | – | 1 | 6 | – | 3 | – | 1 |
| Tennessee Tech | 2 | – | 2 | – | 0 | 4 | – | 4 | – | 0 |
| The Citadel | 2 | – | 2 | – | 1 | 3 | – | 5 | – | 1 |
| Louisiana Normal | 2 | – | 3 | – | 0 | 6 | – | 3 | – | 0 |
| Mississippi College | 2 | – | 3 | – | 0 | 3 | – | 4 | – | 1 |
| Georgetown (KY) | 2 | – | 3 | – | 1 | 2 | – | 5 | – | 1 |
| Mississippi State Teachers | 2 | – | 4 | – | 1 | 3 | – | 5 | – | 2 |
| Southwestern (TN) | 1 | – | 2 | – | 0 | 3 | – | 4 | – | 2 |
| Louisiana Tech | 1 | – | 3 | – | 0 | 1 | – | 7 | – | 0 |
| Louisiana College | 1 | – | 4 | – | 0 | 3 | – | 4 | – | 0 |
| Wofford | 1 | – | 4 | – | 0 | 3 | – | 6 | – | 0 |
| Transylvania | 1 | – | 4 | – | 0 | 1 | – | 7 | – | 1 |
| Erskine | 1 | – | 5 | – | 0 | 2 | – | 7 | – | 0 |
| Union (TN) | 1 | – | 5 | – | 0 | 3 | – | 7 | – | 0 |
| Louisville | 1 | – | 6 | – | 0 | 1 | – | 7 | – | 0 |
| Mercer | 0 | – | 0 | – | 1 | 4 | – | 3 | – | 2 |
| Stetson | 0 | – | 0 | – | 1 | 3 | – | 3 | – | 1 |
| Eastern Kentucky State Teachers | 0 | – | 2 | – | 2 | 1 | – | 2 | – | 3 |
| Middle Tennessee State Teachers | 0 | – | 4 | – | 0 | 1 | – | 7 | – | 1 |
$ – Conference champion

The 1933 Southwestern Lynx football team was an American football team that represented Southwestern, The College of the Mississippi Valley (now known as Rhodes College) as a member of the Dixie Conference and the Southern Intercollegiate Athletic Association (SIAA) in the 1933 college football season. Led by Jimmy R. Haygood in his third season as head coach, the team compiled an overall record of 3–4–2 and with a mark of 1–3–1 in Dixie Conference play and 1–2 against SIAA competition.

== Schedule ==
| Date | Opponent | Site | Result | Attendance | Source |
|---|---|---|---|---|---|
| September 23 | Ole Miss* | Fargason Field; Memphis, TN | T 6–6 | 4,000 | |
| September 29 | at Union (TN) | Athletic Field; Jackson, TN | W 18–0 | 3,000 | |
| October 7 | Birmingham–Southern | Fargason Field; Memphis, TN | L 0–20 | | |
| October 14 | Sewanee* | Fargason Field; Memphis, TN (rivalry) | L 7–12 | | |
| October 21 | at Howard (AL) | Legion Field; Birmingham, AL | L 7–26 | | |
| October 27 | at Mississippi State* | Scott Field; Starkville, MS | W 6–0 | | |
| November 11 | Millsaps | Fargason Field; Memphis, TN | L 0–6 | | |
| November 18 | Chattanooga | Faragason Field; Memphis, TN | T 0–0 | 1,200 | |
| November 30 | at Spring Hill | Mobile, AL | W 12–0 | | |
*Non-conference game
