= 1933 Loyola Wolf Pack football team =

American college football season

1933 Loyola Wolf Pack football
- Conference: Southern Intercollegiate Athletic Association
- Record: 7–2 (3–1 SIAA)
- Head coach: Robert Erskine (1st season)
- Home stadium: Loyola University Stadium

1933 Southern Intercollegiate Athletic Association football standings
	Conf.					Overall
Team	W		L		T	W		L		T
Murray State $	7	–	0	–	0	9	–	0	–	0
Howard (AL)	5	–	0	–	0	7	–	1	–	2
Centenary	3	–	0	–	0	8	–	0	–	4
Furman	4	–	0	–	1	6	–	1	–	2
Union (KY)	3	–	0	–	1	4	–	1	–	1
Miami (FL)	2	–	0	–	1	5	–	1	–	2
Western Kentucky State Teachers	5	–	1	–	0	6	–	2	–	0
Centre	3	–	1	–	0	7	–	3	–	0
Loyola (LA)	3	–	1	–	0	6	–	4	–	1
Rollins	2	–	1	–	0	6	–	2	–	0
SW Louisiana	3	–	2	–	0	6	–	3	–	0
Presbyterian	3	–	2	–	0	4	–	2	–	2
Millsaps	3	–	2	–	1	4	–	4	–	2
Newberry	2	–	2	–	1	6	–	3	–	1
Tennessee Tech	2	–	2	–	0	4	–	4	–	0
The Citadel	2	–	2	–	1	3	–	5	–	1
Louisiana Normal	2	–	3	–	0	6	–	3	–	0
Mississippi College	2	–	3	–	0	3	–	4	–	1
Georgetown (KY)	2	–	3	–	1	2	–	5	–	1
Mississippi State Teachers	2	–	4	–	1	3	–	5	–	2
Southwestern (TN)	1	–	2	–	0	3	–	4	–	2
Louisiana Tech	1	–	3	–	0	1	–	7	–	0
Louisiana College	1	–	4	–	0	3	–	4	–	0
Wofford	1	–	4	–	0	3	–	6	–	0
Transylvania	1	–	4	–	0	1	–	7	–	1
Erskine	1	–	5	–	0	2	–	7	–	0
Union (TN)	1	–	5	–	0	3	–	7	–	0
Louisville	1	–	6	–	0	1	–	7	–	0
Mercer	0	–	0	–	1	4	–	3	–	2
Stetson	0	–	0	–	1	3	–	3	–	1
Eastern Kentucky State Teachers	0	–	2	–	2	1	–	2	–	3
Middle Tennessee State Teachers	0	–	4	–	0	1	–	7	–	1
$ – Conference champion

The 1933 Loyola Wolf Pack football team was an American football team that represented Loyola College of New Orleans (now known as Loyola University New Orleans) as a member of the Southern Intercollegiate Athletic Association (SIAA) during the 1933 college football season. In its first season under head coach Robert Erskine, the team compiled a 7–2 record and outscored opponents by a total of 203 to 54. The team played its home games at Loyola University Stadium in New Orleans.

== Schedule ==
Date	Opponent	Site	Result	Attendance	Source
September 22	Mississippi State Teachers	Loyola Stadium; New Orleans, LA	W 47–0	8,000	
September 29	Southwestern Louisiana	Loyola Stadium; New Orleans, LA	W 12–0		
October 7	at Rice*	Rice Field; Houston, TX	L 0–13	5,000	
October 20	Spring Hill*	Loyola Stadium; New Orleans, LA	W 45–0		
October 27	at Saint Louis*	Walsh Stadium; St. Louis, MO	W 16–6	7,263	
November 3	Xavier*	Loyola Stadium; New Orleans, LA	W 7–0	9,000	
November 10	Mississippi College	Loyola Stadium; New Orleans, LA	W 38–0	6,000	
November 19	North Dakota*	Loyola Stadium; New Orleans, LA	W 26–7		
November 30	Centenary	Loyola Stadium; New Orleans, LA	L 12–28		
*Non-conference game
