= 1933 Mississippi State Teachers Yellow Jackets football team =

American college football season

1933 Mississippi State Teachers Yellow Jackets football
- Conference: Southern Intercollegiate Athletic Association
- Record: 3–5–2 (2–4–1 SIAA)
- Head coach: Pooley Hubert (3rd season)
- Home stadium: Faulkner Field

1933 Southern Intercollegiate Athletic Association football standings
	Conf.					Overall
Team	W		L		T	W		L		T
Murray State $	7	–	0	–	0	9	–	0	–	0
Howard (AL)	5	–	0	–	0	7	–	1	–	2
Centenary	3	–	0	–	0	8	–	0	–	4
Furman	4	–	0	–	1	6	–	1	–	2
Union (KY)	3	–	0	–	1	4	–	1	–	1
Miami (FL)	2	–	0	–	1	5	–	1	–	2
Western Kentucky State Teachers	5	–	1	–	0	6	–	2	–	0
Centre	3	–	1	–	0	7	–	3	–	0
Loyola (LA)	3	–	1	–	0	6	–	4	–	1
Rollins	2	–	1	–	0	6	–	2	–	0
SW Louisiana	3	–	2	–	0	6	–	3	–	0
Presbyterian	3	–	2	–	0	4	–	2	–	2
Millsaps	3	–	2	–	1	4	–	4	–	2
Newberry	2	–	2	–	1	6	–	3	–	1
Tennessee Tech	2	–	2	–	0	4	–	4	–	0
The Citadel	2	–	2	–	1	3	–	5	–	1
Louisiana Normal	2	–	3	–	0	6	–	3	–	0
Mississippi College	2	–	3	–	0	3	–	4	–	1
Georgetown (KY)	2	–	3	–	1	2	–	5	–	1
Mississippi State Teachers	2	–	4	–	1	3	–	5	–	2
Southwestern (TN)	1	–	2	–	0	3	–	4	–	2
Louisiana Tech	1	–	3	–	0	1	–	7	–	0
Louisiana College	1	–	4	–	0	3	–	4	–	0
Wofford	1	–	4	–	0	3	–	6	–	0
Transylvania	1	–	4	–	0	1	–	7	–	1
Erskine	1	–	5	–	0	2	–	7	–	0
Union (TN)	1	–	5	–	0	3	–	7	–	0
Louisville	1	–	6	–	0	1	–	7	–	0
Mercer	0	–	0	–	1	4	–	3	–	2
Stetson	0	–	0	–	1	3	–	3	–	1
Eastern Kentucky State Teachers	0	–	2	–	2	1	–	2	–	3
Middle Tennessee State Teachers	0	–	4	–	0	1	–	7	–	1
$ – Conference champion

The 1933 Mississippi State Teachers Yellow Jackets football team was an American football team that represented the Mississippi State Teachers College (now known as the University of Southern Mississippi) as a member of the Southern Intercollegiate Athletic Association during the 1933 college football season. In their third year under head coach Pooley Hubert, the team compiled a 3–5–2 record.

== Schedule ==
Date	Opponent	Site	Result	Source
September 22	at Loyola (LA)	Loyola University Stadium; New Orleans, LA	L 0–47	
September 30	at Ole Miss*	Hemingway Stadium; Oxford, MS	L 0–45	
October 7	at Mississippi College	Provine Field; Clinton, MS	L 7–33	
October 14	at Millsaps	Jackson, MS	T 0–0	
October 21	Southwestern Louisiana	Faulkner Field; Hattiesburg, MS	W 6–0	
October 28	at Louisiana College	Alumni Field; Pineville, LA	W 21–6	
November 4	at Spring Hill*	Mobile, AL	T 0–0	
November 11	Louisiana Normal^{†}	Faulkner Field; Hattiesburg, MS	L 0–13	
November 25	Delta State*	Faulkner Field; Hattiesburg, MS	L 33–6	
December 1	at Murray State	Murray, KY	L 0–30	
*Non-conference game; ^{†}Homecoming
