= 1933 Louisiana Normal Demons football team =

American college football season

1933 Louisiana Normal Demons football
- Conference: Southern Intercollegiate Athletic Association
- Record: 5–3–1 (2–3 SIAA)
- Head coach: H. Lee Prather (20th season)
- Home stadium: Demon Field

1933 Southern Intercollegiate Athletic Association football standings
| | Conf. | | | | | Overall |
| Team | W | | L | | T | W | | L | | T |
|---|---|---|---|---|---|---|---|---|---|---|
| Murray State $ | 7 | – | 0 | – | 0 | 9 | – | 0 | – | 0 |
| Howard (AL) | 5 | – | 0 | – | 0 | 7 | – | 1 | – | 2 |
| Centenary | 3 | – | 0 | – | 0 | 8 | – | 0 | – | 4 |
| Furman | 4 | – | 0 | – | 1 | 6 | – | 1 | – | 2 |
| Union (KY) | 3 | – | 0 | – | 1 | 4 | – | 1 | – | 1 |
| Miami (FL) | 2 | – | 0 | – | 1 | 5 | – | 1 | – | 2 |
| Western Kentucky State Teachers | 5 | – | 1 | – | 0 | 6 | – | 2 | – | 0 |
| Centre | 3 | – | 1 | – | 0 | 7 | – | 3 | – | 0 |
| Loyola (LA) | 3 | – | 1 | – | 0 | 6 | – | 4 | – | 1 |
| Rollins | 2 | – | 1 | – | 0 | 6 | – | 2 | – | 0 |
| SW Louisiana | 3 | – | 2 | – | 0 | 6 | – | 3 | – | 0 |
| Presbyterian | 3 | – | 2 | – | 0 | 4 | – | 2 | – | 2 |
| Millsaps | 3 | – | 2 | – | 1 | 4 | – | 4 | – | 2 |
| Newberry | 2 | – | 2 | – | 1 | 6 | – | 3 | – | 1 |
| Tennessee Tech | 2 | – | 2 | – | 0 | 4 | – | 4 | – | 0 |
| The Citadel | 2 | – | 2 | – | 1 | 3 | – | 5 | – | 1 |
| Louisiana Normal | 2 | – | 3 | – | 0 | 6 | – | 3 | – | 0 |
| Mississippi College | 2 | – | 3 | – | 0 | 3 | – | 4 | – | 1 |
| Georgetown (KY) | 2 | – | 3 | – | 1 | 2 | – | 5 | – | 1 |
| Mississippi State Teachers | 2 | – | 4 | – | 1 | 3 | – | 5 | – | 2 |
| Southwestern (TN) | 1 | – | 2 | – | 0 | 3 | – | 4 | – | 2 |
| Louisiana Tech | 1 | – | 3 | – | 0 | 1 | – | 7 | – | 0 |
| Louisiana College | 1 | – | 4 | – | 0 | 3 | – | 4 | – | 0 |
| Wofford | 1 | – | 4 | – | 0 | 3 | – | 6 | – | 0 |
| Transylvania | 1 | – | 4 | – | 0 | 1 | – | 7 | – | 1 |
| Erskine | 1 | – | 5 | – | 0 | 2 | – | 7 | – | 0 |
| Union (TN) | 1 | – | 5 | – | 0 | 3 | – | 7 | – | 0 |
| Louisville | 1 | – | 6 | – | 0 | 1 | – | 7 | – | 0 |
| Mercer | 0 | – | 0 | – | 1 | 4 | – | 3 | – | 2 |
| Stetson | 0 | – | 0 | – | 1 | 3 | – | 3 | – | 1 |
| Eastern Kentucky State Teachers | 0 | – | 2 | – | 2 | 1 | – | 2 | – | 3 |
| Middle Tennessee State Teachers | 0 | – | 4 | – | 0 | 1 | – | 7 | – | 1 |
$ – Conference champion

The 1933 Louisiana Normal Demons football team represented Louisiana State Normal College (now known as Northwestern State University) as a member the Southern Intercollegiate Athletic Association (SIAA) during the 1933 college football season. Led by 20th-year head coach H. Lee Prather, the Demons compiled an overall record of 6–3 with a mark of 2–3 in conference play.

== Schedule ==
| Date | Opponent | Site | Result | Attendance | Source |
|---|---|---|---|---|---|
| September 23 | at Centenary | Centenary Stadium; Shreveport, LA | L 0–18 | 4,000 | |
| September 29 | at East Texas State* | Commerce, TX | T 0–0 | | |
| October 6 | Delta State* | Demon Field; Natchitoches, LA | W 43–6 | | |
| October 13 | Louisiana College | Demon Field; Natchitoches, LA | W 25–0 | | |
| October 20 | Lon Morris* | Demon Field; Natchitoches, LA | W 19–9 | | |
| October 28 | at Louisiana Tech | Tech Stadium; Ruston, LA (rivalry) | L 0–6 | | |
| November 3 | Stephen F. Austin* | Demon Field; Natchitoches, LA (rivalry) | W 39–0 | | |
| November 11 | at Mississippi State Teachers | Faulkner Field; Hattiesburg, MS | W 13–0 | | |
| November 30 | Southwestern Louisiana | Demon Field; Natchitoches, LA | L 2–10 | | |
*Non-conference game
