= Parkway Field =

Baseball park in Louisville, Kentucky

- Parkway Field, August 15, 1923
- Interactive map of Parkway Field
- Address: Louisville, Kentucky
- Coordinates: 38°12′46.25″N 85°45′30.05″W

Tenants
- Louisville Colonels (AA) (1923–1950s); Louisville Black Caps (NNL/NSL) (1930-–1932); Louisville Buckeyes (NAL) (1949); University of Louisville baseball team (–1998)

Parkway Field is the name of a baseball park that stood in Louisville, Kentucky on the University of Louisville campus. It was home to college, minor league, and negro league teams, with the longest stints by the Louisville Colonels of the American Association from 1923 into the mid-1950s, and the University of Louisville baseball team for several decades until they abandoned it in 1998 in favor of Cardinal Stadium. The grandstand that allowed professional baseball to be played at the venue in the first half of the 20th century was torn down in 1961.

== Dimensions ==
In the Louisville Courier-Journal of August 16, 1936, p. 41, the dimensions were given as follows: home plate to left field 331 feet (101 m); center field 512 feet (156 m); right field 350 feet (110 m); backstop 60 feet (18 m). Later, signs were posted on the fences, stating left field 329, center 507, right 345. The Louisville Courier-Journal of June 10, 1944, p. 13, reported that the ballpark had been re-surveyed, and that centerfield (whose wall had been moved inward a few years earlier) was "only" 485 feet (148 m) from home plate; the foul line distances of 329 and 345 were confirmed.

== University of Louisville baseball ==
Prior to its demolition, Parkway Field had become a homerun haven for University of Louisville Cardinals head coach Gene Baker's "Over the Wall Gang." The Cardinals led NCAA Division I in homers in 1991 and 1992 while finishing second in 1995. The 1991 team featured six Cardinals who tallied at least 15 homeruns each, Richie Hawks, Rob Newman, Greg Gooding, Dan Kopriva, Charlie Allen, and Darren Oppel. The 1992 club also topped the nation in team batting average and team slugging percentage.

== Remnants ==
The ballpark site is south of Eastern Parkway and west of Brook Street, near the university campus. The field itself remains, and is still used for intramural football and soccer at the university. The stadium seating has long since been demolished. In the early 2000s there were still some visible remnants of the ballfield, including the poorly kept diamond, backstop, dugouts and outfield walls. Those have since been removed, leaving just a chain-link fenced, rectangular football/soccer field.

== See also ==
- Sports in Louisville, Kentucky
