= 1938 Southeastern Conference football season =

- Sport: Football
- Duration: September 23, 1938 – January 2, 1939
- Teams: 13
- Champion: Tennessee

SEC seasons
- ← 1937 1939 →

1938 Southeastern Conference football standings
	Conf.					Overall
Team		W		L			W		L
No. 2 Tennessee $	7	–	0	–	0	11	–	0	–	0
No. 13 Alabama	4	–	1	–	1	7	–	1	–	1
No. 19 Tulane	4	–	1	–	1	7	–	2	–	1
Ole Miss	3	–	2	–	0	9	–	2	–	0
Georgia Tech	2	–	1	–	3	3	–	4	–	3
Vanderbilt	4	–	3	–	0	6	–	3	–	0
Florida	2	–	2	–	1	4	–	6	–	1
Auburn	3	–	3	–	1	4	–	5	–	1
Georgia	1	–	2	–	1	5	–	4	–	1
LSU	2	–	4	–	0	6	–	4	–	0
Mississippi State	1	–	4	–	0	4	–	6	–	0
Kentucky	0	–	4	–	0	2	–	7	–	0
Sewanee	0	–	6	–	0	1	–	8	–	0
$ – Conference champion; Rankings from AP Poll

The 1938 Southeastern Conference football season was the sixth season of college football played by the member schools of the Southeastern Conference (SEC) and was a part of the 1938 college football season.Tennessee compiled an 11–0 overall record, with a conference record of 6–0, and were SEC champion. Tennessee was also named national champion by NCAA-designated major selectors of Berryman, Billingsley, Boand, Dunkel, College Football Researchers Association, Houlgate, Litkenhous, Poling, Sagarin, Sagarin (ELO-Chess)

== Results and team statistics ==
Conf. rank	Team	Head coach	Overall record	Conf. record	AP final	PPG	PAG
1	Tennessee	Robert Neyland	11–0–0 (1.000)	7–0–0 (1.000)	No. 2	26.6	1.5
T–2	Alabama	Frank Thomas	7–1–1 (.833)	4–1–1 (.750)	No 13	16.6	4.4
T–2	Tulane	Red Dawson	7–2–1 (.750)	4–1–1 (.750)	No. 19	21.1	5.3
4	Ole Miss	Harry Mehre	9–2–0 (.818)	3–2–0 (.600)		21.1	10.9
5	Georgia Tech	William Alexander	3–4–3 (.450)	2–1–3 (.583)		7.2	8.4
6	Vanderbilt	Ray Morrison	6–3–0 (.667)	4–3–0 (.571)		9.6	5.4
7	Florida	Josh Cody	4–6–1 (.409)	2–2–1 (.500)		10.2	13.5
8	Auburn	Jack Meagher	4–5–1 (.450)	3–3–1 (.500)		11.0	8.8
9	Georgia	Joel Hunt	5–4–1 (.550)	1–2–1 (.375)		14.5	14.3
10	LSU	Bernie Moore	6–4–0 (.600)	2–4–0 (.333)		16.0	8.9
11	Mississippi State	Spike Nelson	4–6–0 (.400)	1–4–0 (.200)		12.3	13.1
12	Kentucky	Albert D. Kirwan	2–7–0 (.222)	0–4–0 (.000)		16.7	17.8
13	Sewanee	Harry E. Clark	1–8–0 (.111)	0–6–0 (.000)		6.6	23.7

Key
AP final = Rankings from AP sports writers. See 1938 college football rankings
PPG = Average of points scored per game
PAG = Average of points allowed per game

== Schedule ==
Index to colors and formatting
SEC member won
SEC member lost
SEC member tie
SEC teams in **bold**

=== Week One ===
Date	Visiting team	Home team	Site	Result	Attendance	Ref.
September 23	Birmingham–Southern	**Auburn**	Cramton Bowl • Montgomery, AL	**W** 14–0		
September 24	**Alabama**	USC	Los Angeles Memorial Coliseum • Los Angeles, CA	**W** 19–7	70,000	
September 24	**Vanderbilt**	Washington University	Francis Field • St. Louis, MO	**W** 20–0	5,000	
September 24	The Citadel	**Georgia**	Sanford Stadium • Athens, GA	**W** 20–12	7,000	
September 24	Howard (AL)	**Mississippi State**	Scott Field • Starkville, MS	**W** 19–0		
September 24	Maryville (TN)	**Kentucky**	McLean Stadium • Lexington, KY	**W** 46–7		
September 24	Clemson	**Tulane**	Tulane Stadium • New Orleans, LA	**L** 10–13	12,000	
September 24	Stetson	**Florida**	Florida Field • Gainesville, FL	**L** 14–16	8,000	
September 24	**Sewanee**	**Tennessee**	Shields–Watkins Field • Knoxville, TN	**TEN** 26–3	15,000	
September 24	**Ole Miss**	**LSU**	Tiger Stadium • Baton Rouge, LA (rivalry)	**OM** 20–7	25,000	

=== Week Two ===
Date	Visiting team	Home team	Site	Result	Attendance	Ref.
October 1	Clemson	**Tennessee**	Shields–Watkins Field • Knoxville, TN	**W** 20–7	16,000	
October 1	Howard (AL)	**Alabama**	Denny Stadium • Tuscaloosa, AL	**W** 34–0	8,000	
October 1	Louisiana Tech	**Ole Miss**	Hemingway Stadium • Oxford, MS	**W** 27–7		
October 1	Mercer	**Georgia Tech**	Grant Field • Atlanta, GA	**W** 19–0	8,000	
October 1	Western Kentucky State Teachers	**Vanderbilt**	Dudley Field • Nashville, TN	**W** 12–0	7,000	
October 1	**Georgia**	South Carolina	Columbia Municipal Stadium • Columbia, SC (rivalry)	**W** 7–6	13,000	
October 1	Oglethorpe	**Kentucky**	McLean Stadium • Lexington, KY	**W** 66–0	7,000	
October 1	**Sewanee**	Southwestern (TN)	Crump Stadium • Memphis, TN (rivalry)	**L** 0–47		
October 1	**Auburn**	**Tulane**	Tulane Stadium • New Orleans, LA (rivalry)	**T** 0–0	18,000	
October 1	**Florida**	**Mississippi State**	Scott Field • Starkville, MS	**MSS** 22–0		
October 2	**LSU**	Texas	War Memorial Stadium • Austin, TX	**W** 20–0	17,000	

=== Week Three ===
Date	Visiting team	Home team	Site	Result	Attendance	Ref.
October 7	Furman	**Georgia**	Sanford Stadium • Athens, GA	**W** 38–7		
October 8	NC State	**Alabama**	Denny Stadium • Tuscaloosa, AL	**W** 14–0	10,000	
October 8	**Tulane**	North Carolina	Kenan Memorial Stadium • Chapel Hill, NC	**W** 17–14	22,000	
October 8	Mississippi State Teachers	**Ole Miss**	Hemingway Stadium • Oxford, MS	**W** 14–0		
October 8	Rice	**LSU**	Tiger Stadium • Baton Rouge, LA	**W** 3–0	40,000	
October 8	Louisiana Tech	**Mississippi State**	Scott Field • Starkville, MS	**W** 48–0	8,000	
October 8	Notre Dame	**Georgia Tech**	Grant Field • Atlanta, GA	**L** 6–14	26,533	
October 8	**Auburn**	**Tennessee**	Shields–Watkins Field • Knoxville, TN (rivalry)	**TEN** 7–0	18,000	
October 8	**Vanderbilt**	**Kentucky**	McLean Stadium • Lexington, KY (rivalry)	**VAN** 14–7	13,500	
October 8	**Sewanee**	**Florida**	Florida Field • Gainesville, FL	**FLA** 10–6	5,000	

=== Week Four ===
Date	Visiting team	Home team	Site	Result	Attendance	Ref.
October 14	Hiwassee	**Sewanee**	Hardee Field • Sewanee, TN	**W** 44–0		
October 14	**Mississippi State**	**Auburn**	Cramton Bowl • Montgomery, AL	**AUB** 20–6		
October 15	Rice	**Tulane**	Tulane Stadium • New Orleans, LA	**W** 26–17	24,000	
October 15	Mercer	**Georgia**	Sanford Stadium • Athens, GA	**W** 28–19		
October 15	Loyola (LA)	**LSU**	Tiger Stadium • Baton Rouge, LA	**W** 47–6	10,000	
October 15	**Georgia Tech**	Duke	Duke Stadium • Durham, NC	**L** 0–6	28,000	
October 15	Miami (FL)	**Florida**	Florida Field • Gainesville, FL (rivalry)	**L** 7–19	15,000	
October 15	Washington and Lee	**Kentucky**	McLean Stadium • Lexington, KY	**L** 0–8	10,000	
October 15	**Tennessee**	**Alabama**	Legion Field • Birmingham, AL (rivalry)	**TEN** 13–0	25,000	
October 15	**Ole Miss**	**Vanderbilt**	Dudley Field • Nashville, TN (rivalry)	**VAN** 13–7		

=== Week Five ===
Date	Visiting team	Home team	Site	Result	Attendance	Ref.
October 21	**Mississippi State**	Duquesne	Forbes Field • Pittsburgh, PA	**W** 12–7	12,000	
October 22	The Citadel	No. 8 **Tennessee**	Shields–Watkins Field • Knoxville, TN	**W** 44–0	8,000	
October 22	Mercer	**Tulane**	Tulane Stadium • New Orleans, LA	**W** 51–0	15,000	
October 22	Centenary	**Ole Miss**	Hemingway Stadium • Oxford, MS	**W** 47–14		
October 22	**Florida**	Tampa	Phillips Field • Tampa, FL	**W** 33–0	10,000	
October 22	**Georgia**	No. 14 Holy Cross	Fitton Field • Worcester, MA	**L** 6–29	24,000–25,000	
October 22	**Kentucky**	Xavier	Xavier Stadium • Cincinnati, OH	**L** 7–26	9,000	
October 22	**Sewanee**	No. 15 **Alabama**	Denny Stadium • Tuscaloosa, AL	**ALA** 32–0	5,000	
October 22	**Auburn**	**Georgia Tech**	Grant Field • Atlanta, GA (rivalry)	**GT** 7–6	20,000	
October 22	No. 16 **Vanderbilt**	**LSU**	Tiger Stadium • Baton Rouge, LA	**LSU** 7–0	35,000	
^{#}Rankings from AP Poll released prior to game.

=== Week Six ===
Date	Visiting team	Home team	Site	Result	Attendance	Ref.
October 29	**Ole Miss**	George Washington	Griffith Stadium • Washington, DC	**W** 25–0		
October 29	**Florida**	Boston College	Fenway Park • Boston, MA	**L** 0–33	10,000	
October 29	**Auburn**	Rice	Rice Field • Houston, TX	**L** 0–14		
October 29	Tennessee Tech	**Sewanee**	Hardee Field • Sewanee, TN	**L** 6–7		
October 29	**LSU**	No. 8 **Tennessee**	Shields–Watkins Field • Knoxville, TN	**TEN** 14–6	36,000	
October 29	No. 18 **Alabama**	**Kentucky**	McLean Stadium • Lexington, KY	**ALA** 26–6	15,000	
October 29	**Mississippi State**	**Tulane**	Tulane Stadium • New Orleans, LA	**TUL** 27–0	20,000	
October 29	**Georgia Tech**	**Vanderbilt**	Dudley Field • Nashville, TN (rivalry)	**VAN** 13–7	17,000	
^{#}Rankings from AP Poll released prior to game.

=== Week Seven ===
Date	Visiting team	Home team	Site	Result	Attendance	Ref.
November 5	Chattanooga	No. 6 **Tennessee**	Shields–Watkins Field • Knoxville, TN	**W** 45–0	7,500	
November 5	**Ole Miss**	Saint Louis	Walsh Stadium • St Louis, MO	**W** 14–12	8,429	
November 5	**Auburn**	Villanova	Shibe Park • Philadelphia, PA	**L** 12–25	17,000	
November 5	**Tulane**	No. 15 **Alabama**	Legion Field • Birmingham, AL	**ALA** 3–0	19,000	
November 5	**Kentucky**	**Georgia Tech**	Grant Field • Atlanta, GA	**GT** 19–18	10,000	
November 5	**Sewanee**	**Vanderbilt**	Dudley Field • Nashville, TN (rivalry)	**VAN** 14–0	7,000	
November 5	**Georgia**	**Florida**	Fairfield Stadium • Jacksonville, FL (rivalry)	**UGA** 19–6	17,000	
November 5	**Mississippi State**	**LSU**	Tiger Stadium • Baton Rouge, LA (rivalry)	**LSU** 32–7		
^{#}Rankings from AP Poll released prior to game.

=== Week Eight ===
Date	Visiting team	Home team	Site	Result	Attendance	Ref.
November 12	Maryland	Florida	Florida Field • Gainesville, FL	**W** 21–7	10,000	
November 12	Centenary	Mississippi State	Ray Stadium • Meridian, MS	**L** 0–19	5,000	
November 12	Clemson	Kentucky	McLean Stadium • Lexington, KY	**L** 0–14	6,000	
November 12	No. 4 **Tennessee**	Vanderbilt	Dudley Field • Nashville, TN (rivalry)	**TEN** 14–0	23,000	
November 12	No. 16 **Alabama**	Georgia Tech	Grant Field • Atlanta, GA (rivalry)	**T** 14–14	35,000	
November 12	**Georgia**	Tulane	Tulane Stadium • New Orleans, LA	**TUL** 28–6		
November 12	**Sewanee**	Ole Miss	Hemingway Stadium • Oxford, MS	**OM** 39–0		
November 12	**LSU**	Auburn	Legion Field • Birmingham, AL (rivalry)	**AUB** 28–6	14,000	
^{#}Rankings from AP Poll released prior to game.

=== Week Eight ===
Date	Visiting team	Home team	Site	Result	Attendance	Ref.
November 16	Arkansas	**Ole Miss**	Crump Stadium • Memphis, TN (rivalry)	**W** 20–14	12,000	
November 19	Southwestern Louisiana	**LSU**	Tiger Stadium • Baton Rouge, LA	**W** 32–0		
November 19	**Mississippi State**	Southwestern (TN)	Crump Stadium • Memphis, TN	**L** 3–7	12,000	
November 19	**Sewanee**	**Tulane**	Tulane Stadium • New Orleans, LA	**TUL** 38–0		
November 19	**Florida**	**Georgia Tech**	Grant Field • Atlanta, GA	**T** 0–0	5,000	
November 19	**Auburn**	**Georgia**	Memorial Stadium • Columbus, GA (rivalry)	**AUB** 23–14	12,000	
^{#}Rankings from AP Poll released prior to game.

=== Week Nine ===
Date	Visiting team	Home team	Site	Result	Attendance	Ref.
November 24	Kentucky	No. 4 **Tennessee**	Shields–Watkins Field • Knoxville, TN (rivalry)	**TEN** 46–0		
November 24	Vanderbilt	**Alabama**	Legion Field • Birmingham, AL	**ALA** 7–0	25,000	
November 26	Tulane	**LSU**	Tiger Stadium • Baton Rouge, LA (rivalry)	**TUL** 14–0	40,000	
November 26	Ole Miss	**Mississippi State**	Scott Field • Starkville, MS (rivalry)	**OM** 19–6	15,000	
November 26	Georgia Tech	**Georgia**	Sanford Stadium • Athens, GA (rivalry)	**T** 0–0	28,000	
November 26	Auburn	**Florida**	Fairfield Stadium • Jacksonville, FL (rivalry)	**FLA** 9–7	5,000	
^{#}Rankings from AP Poll released prior to game.

=== Week Ten ===
Date	Visiting team	Home team	Site	Result	Attendance	Ref.
December 2	**Georgia**	Miami (FL)	Burdine Stadium • Miami, FL	**L** 7–13	23,367	
December 3	Temple	**Florida**	Florida Field • Gainesville, FL	**L** 12–20		
December 3	**Ole Miss**	No. 4 **Tennessee**	Crump Stadium • Memphis, TN	**TEN** 47–0	21,000	
^{#}Rankings from AP Poll released prior to game.

=== Postseason ===
Date	Visiting team	Home team	Site	Result	Attendance	Ref.
December 26	**Georgia Tech**	No. 12 California	California Memorial Stadium • Berkeley, CA	**L** 0–13	40,000	
January 2, 1939	No. 4 Oklahoma	No. 2 **Tennessee**	Burdine Stadium • Miami, FL (Orange Bowl)	**W** 17–0	32,191	
^{#}Rankings from AP Poll released prior to game.

== All-conference players ==
The following players were recognized as consensus first-team honors from the Associated Press (AP) and United Press (UP) on the 1938 All-SEC football team:

- Bowden Wyatt, End, Tennessee (AP-1, UP-1)
- Eddie Gatto, Tackle, LSU (AP-1, UP-1)
- Bo Russell, Tackle, Auburn (AP-1, UP-1)
- Bob Suffridge, Guard, Tennessee (AP-1, UP-1)
- George Cafego, Quarterback, Tennessee (AP-1, UP-1)
- Parker Hall, Halfback, Ole Miss (AP-1, UP-1)
- Warren Brunner, Halfback, Tulane (AP-1, UP-1)
- Charlie Holm, Fullback, Alabama (AP-1, UP-1)

== All-Americans ==
Two SEC players were consensus first-team picks on the 1938 College Football All-America Team:

- Bowden Wyatt, End, Tennessee (AAB, CO)
- Parker Hall, Halfback, Ole Miss (AP, UP)

Other SEC players receiving All-American honors from at least one selector were:

- Bo Russell, Tackle, Auburn (AP-2)
- Eddie Gatto, Tackle, LSU (ID-2)
- Bob Suffridge, Guard, Tennessee (UP-1; NEA-2; AP-3)
- George Cafego, Quarterback, Tennessee (AP-2; CP-1; NEA-1; LIB; ID-1; DT; PW)
- Warren Brunner, Halfback, Tulane (AP-3)

== Head coaches ==
Records through the completion of the 1938 season

Team	Head coach	Years at school	Overall record	Record at school	SEC record
Alabama	Frank Thomas	8	90–17–5 (.826)	64–8–4 (.868)	31–3–3 (.878)
Auburn	Jack Meagher	5	53–45–1 (.540)	27–19–6 (.577)	17–13–4 (.559)
Florida	Josh Cody	3	51–49–2 (.510)	12–19–1 (.391)	6–11–1 (.361)
Georgia	Joel Hunt	1	5–4–1 (.550)	5–4–1 (.550)	1–2–1 (.375)
Georgia Tech	William Alexander	19	95–72–15 (.563)	95–72–15 (.563)	13–21–5 (.397)
Kentucky	Albert D. Kirwan	1	2–7–0 (.222)	2–7–0 (.222)	0–4–0 (.000)
LSU	Bernie Moore	4	45–21–4 (.671)	33–9–1 (.779)	18–5–0 (.783)
Mississippi State	Spike Nelson	1	4–6–0 (.400)	4–6–0 (.400)	1–4–0 (.200)
Ole Miss	Harry Mehre	1	68–36–6 (.645)	9–2–0 (.818)	15–14–2 (.516)
Sewanee	Harry E. Clark	8	18–51–3 (.271)	18–51–3 (.271)	0–33–0 (.000)
Tennessee	Robert Neyland	12	99–14–8 (.851)	99–14–8 (.851)	24–7–2 (.758)
Tulane	Red Dawson	3	18–9–3 (.650)	18–9–3 (.650)	8–7–3 (.528)
Vanderbilt	Ray Morrison	5	111–59–23 (.635)	27–15–1 (.640)	14–9–1 (.604)

== 1939 NFL draft ==
The following SEC players were selected in the 1939 NFL draft:

Round	Overall pick	Player name	School	Position	NFL team
1	3	Parker Hall	Ole Miss	Running back	Cleveland Rams
3	23	Charlie Holm	Alabama	Back	Washington Redskins
5	33	Eddie Gatto	LSU	Tackle	Cleveland Rams
7	58	Quinton Lumpkin	Georgia	Center	Washington Redskins
8	62	Sherm Hinkebein	Kentucky	Center	Chicago Cardinals
8	63	Warren "Bronco" Brunner	Tulane	Back	Cleveland Rams
8	68	Bo Russell	Auburn	Tackle	Washington Redskins
9	73	Lew Bostick	Alabama	Offensive guard	Cleveland Rams
10	85	Kimble Bradley	Ole Miss	Back	Brooklyn Dodgers
10	86	Walt Wood	Tennessee	Back	Chicago Bears
11	91	Bowden Wyatt	Tennessee	End	Chicago Cardinals
14	129	Bill Badgett	Georgia	Tackle	Green Bay Packers
15	133	Ben Friend	LSU	Tackle	Cleveland Rams
20	184	Dick Gormley	LSU	Center	Philadelphia Eagles
20	190	Lyle Smith	Tulane	Offensive guard	New York Giants
