= 1938–39 NCAA football bowl games =

College football postseason game series

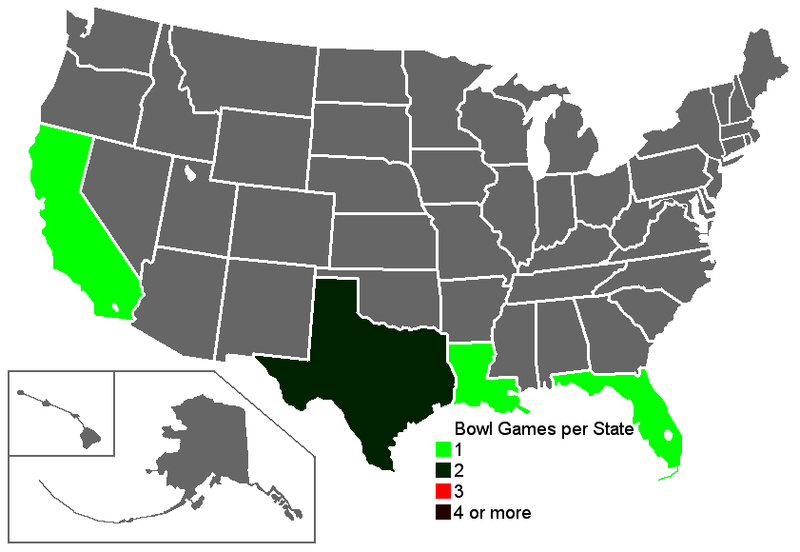
- Number of bowl games per state
- Season: 1938
- Number of bowls: 5
- All-star games: Blue–Gray Football Classic; East–West Shrine Game
- Bowl games: January 2, 1939
- Champions: TCU Horned Frogs (AP); Tennessee Volunteers (Dunkel); Notre Dame Fighting Irish (Dickinson)
Bowl record by conference
Conference	Bowls	Record	Final AP poll
Independents	2	1–1 (0.500)	8
Border	2	0–2 (0.000)	1
Mountain States	1	1–0 (1.000)	0
Pacific Coast	1	1–0 (1.000)	2
SEC	1	1–0 (1.000)	3
SWC	1	1–0 (1.000)	1
Big Six	1	0–1 (0.000)	1
Southern	1	0–1 (0.000)	1
Big Ten	0	0–0 (–)	3

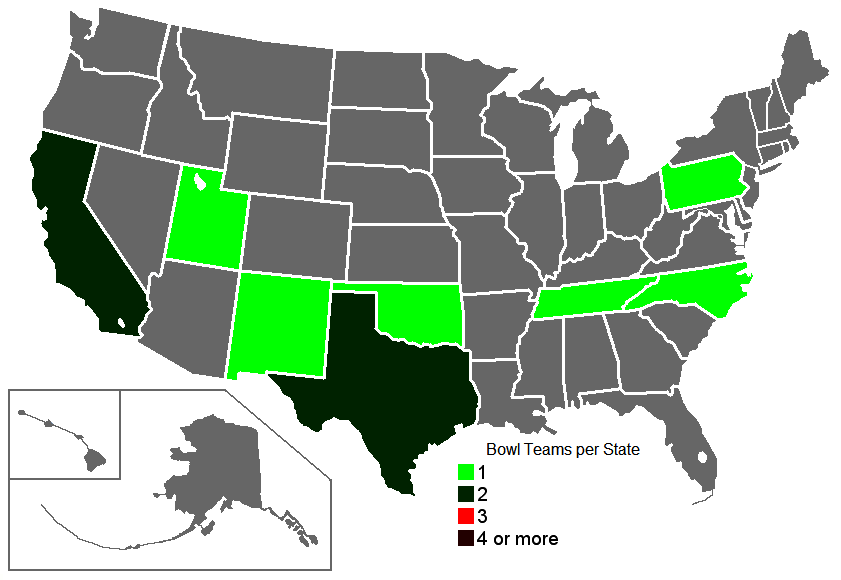
Number of bowl teams per state

The 1938–39 NCAA football bowl games were the final games of the National Collegiate Athletic Association (NCAA) 1938 college football season and featured five bowl games, each of which had been held the previous season. All five games were played on January 2, 1939, as New Year's Day fell on a Sunday. Contemporary polls selected different national champions, as the AP Poll named TCU, the Dunkel System chose Tennessee, and the Dickinson System designated Notre Dame.

== Poll rankings ==
The below table lists top teams (per the AP poll taken after the completion of the regular season), their win–loss records (prior to bowl games), and the bowls they later played in.

AP	Team	W–L	Conf.	Bowl
1	TCU Horned Frogs	10–0	SWC	Sugar Bowl
2	Tennessee Volunteers	10–0	SEC	Orange Bowl
3	Duke Blue Devils	9–0	Southern	Rose Bowl
4	Oklahoma Sooners	10–0	Big Six	Orange Bowl
5	Notre Dame Fighting Irish	8–1	Ind.	—
6	Carnegie Tech Tartans	6–1	Ind.	Sugar Bowl
7	USC Trojans	8–2	PCC	Rose Bowl
8	Pittsburgh Panthers	8–2	Ind.	—
9	Holy Cross Crusaders	8–1	Ind.	—
10	Minnesota Golden Gophers	6–2	Big Ten	— †
11	Texas Tech Red Raiders	10–0	Border	Cotton Bowl Classic
12	Cornell Big Red	5–1–1	Ind.	—
13	Alabama Crimson Tide	7–1–1	SEC	—
14	California Golden Bears	10–1	PCC	—
15	Fordham Rams	6–1–2	Ind.	—
16	Michigan Wolverines	6–1–1	Big Ten	— †
17	Northwestern Wildcats	4–2–2	Big Ten	— †
18	Villanova Wildcats	8–0–1	Ind.	—
19	Tulane Green Wave	7–2–1	SEC	—
20	Dartmouth Indians	7–2	Ind.	—

† The Big Ten Conference did not allow its members to participate in bowl games until the 1947 Rose Bowl.

== Bowl schedule ==
Rankings are from the final regular season AP Poll.

Date	Game	Site	Teams	Affiliations	Results
Jan. 2	Rose Bowl	Rose Bowl; Pasadena, California	#7 USC Trojans (8–2) #3 Duke Blue Devils (9–0)	PCC; Southern	USC 7 Duke 3
Jan. 2	Orange Bowl	Burdine Stadium; Miami, Florida	#2 Tennessee Volunteers (10–0) #4 Oklahoma Sooners (10–0)	SEC; Big Six	Tennessee 17; Oklahoma 0
Jan. 2	Sugar Bowl	Tulane Stadium; New Orleans, Louisiana	#1 TCU Horned Frogs (10–0) #6 Carnegie Tech Tartans (6–1)	SWC; Independent	TCU 15; Carnegie Tech 7
Jan. 2	Sun Bowl	Kidd Field; El Paso, Texas	Utah Utes (6–1–2); New Mexico Lobos (8–2)	Mountain States; Border	Utah 26; New Mexico 0
Jan. 2	Cotton Bowl Classic	Cotton Bowl; Dallas, Texas	Saint Mary's Gaels (5–2) #11 Texas Tech Red Raiders (10–0)	Independent; Border	Saint Mary's 20; Texas Tech 13

=== Conference performance in bowl games ===
Conference	Games	Record			Bowls	
Conference	Games	W	L	Pct.	Won	Lost
Independents	2	1	1	.500	Cotton	Sugar
Border	2	0	2	.000	—	Cotton, Sun
Mountain States	1	1	0	1.000	Sun	—
Pacific Coast	1	1	0	1.000	Rose	—
SEC	1	1	0	1.000	Orange	—
SWC	1	1	0	1.000	Sugar	—
Big Six	1	0	1	.000	—	Orange
Southern	1	0	1	.000	—	Rose

== Game recaps ==
NOTE: Rankings used are the final regular season AP Rankings whenever noted

=== Rose Bowl ===
	1	2	3	4	Total
#7 USC	0	0	0	7	7
#3 Duke	0	0	0	3	3

Qtr.	Team	Scoring play	Score
4	DUKE	Ruffa 23 yard FG	DUKE 3–0
4	USC	Krueger 19 yard pass from Nave, Gaspar kick good	USC 7–3

=== Orange Bowl ===
	1	2	3	4	Total
#2 Tennessee	7	3	0	7	17
#4 Oklahoma	0	0	0	0	0

Qtr.	Team	Scoring play	Score
1	TENN	Foxx 8 yard rush, Wyatt kick good	TENN 7–0
2	TENN	Wyatt 22 yard FG	TENN 10–0
4	TENN	Wood 19 yard rush, Foxx kick good	TENN 17–0

=== Sugar Bowl ===
	1	2	3	4	Total
#1 TCU	0	6	6	3	15
#6 Carnegie Tech	0	7	0	0	7

Qtr.	Team	Scoring play	Score
2	TCU	Sparks 1 yard rush, kick failed	TCU 6–0
2	CT	Muha 37 yard pass from Moroz, Muha kick	TECH 7–6
3	TCU	Horner 44 pass from O'Brien, kick failed	TCU 12–7
4	TCU	O'Brien 19 yard FG	TCU 15–7

=== Sun Bowl ===
	1	2	3	4	Total
Utah	14	6	0	6	26
New Mexico	0	0	0	0	0

Qtr.	Team	Scoring play	Score
1	UTAH	Pace 15 yard rush, McGarry kick	UTAH 7–0
1	UTAH	Peterson 64 yard interception return, McGarry kick	UTAH 14–0
2	UTAH	Peterson 9 yard rush, kick failed	UTAH 20–0
4	UTAH	Gehrke 10 yard rush, kick failed	UTAH 26–0

=== Cotton Bowl Classic ===
	1	2	3	4	Total
Saint Mary's	7	7	6	0	20
#11 Texas Tech	0	0	0	13	13

Qtr.	Team	Scoring play	Score
1	STM	Heffernan 9 yard rush, Perrie kick good	STM 7–0
2	STM	Klotovich 1 yard rush, Marefos kick good	STM 14–0
3	STM	Smith 24 yard interception return, kick failed	STM 20–0
4	TTU	Tarbox 33 yard pass from Barnett, Marek kick	STM 20–6
4	TTU	McKnight 31 yard pass from Barnett, kick failed	STM 20–13

== See also ==
- Prairie View Bowl
