= List of Alabama Crimson Tide starting quarterbacks =

College football list

This is a list of every Alabama Crimson Tide football team quarterback and the years they participated on the Alabama Crimson Tide football team. Alabama quarterbacks have played prominent roles in American society off the gridiron as well. Both Farley Moody and Charlie Joplin died while serving in the First World War.

== Starting quarterbacks ==
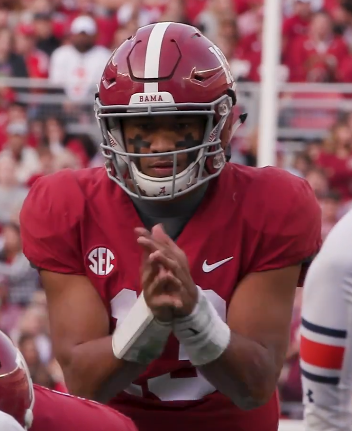
Tua Tagovailoa

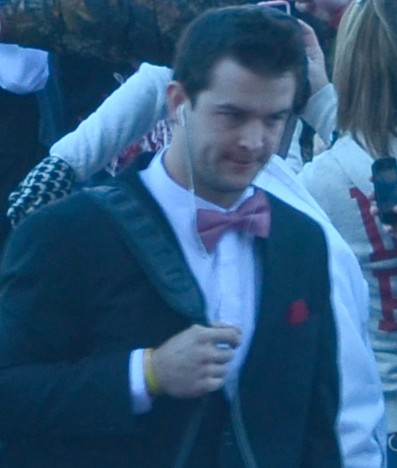
A. J. McCarron in 2012.

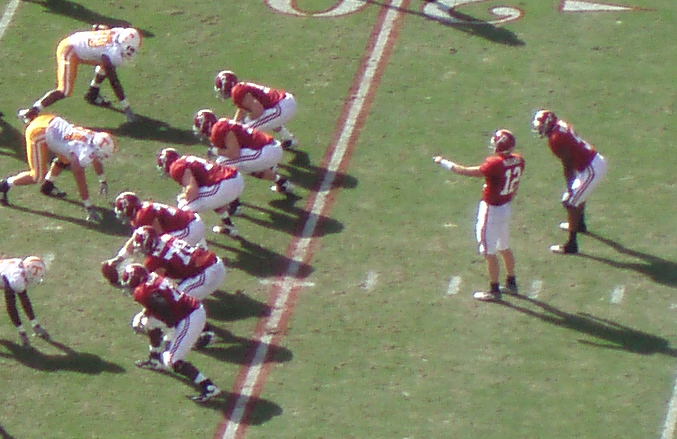
Greg McElroy in the shotgun versus Tennessee.

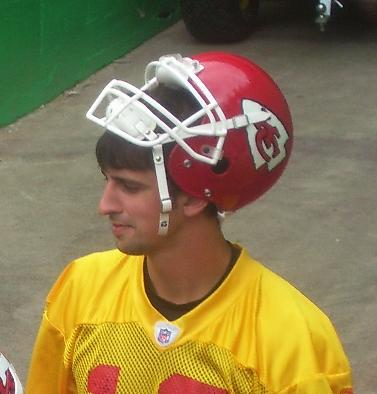
Brodie Croyle with the Chiefs.

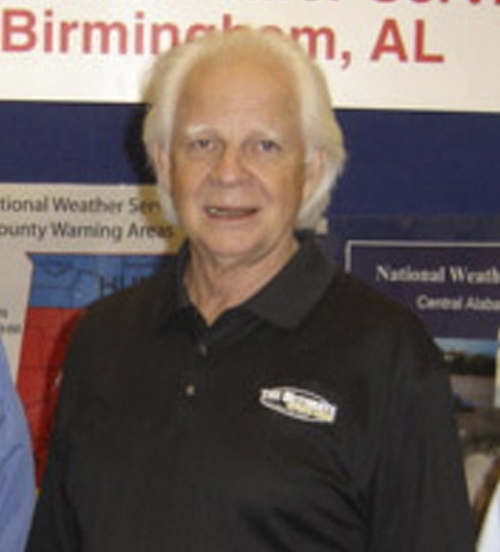
Ken Stabler

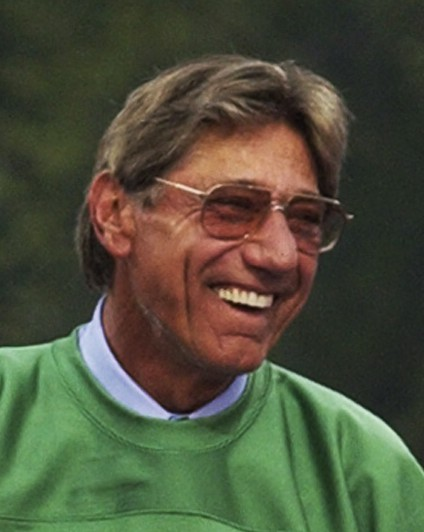
Joe Namath

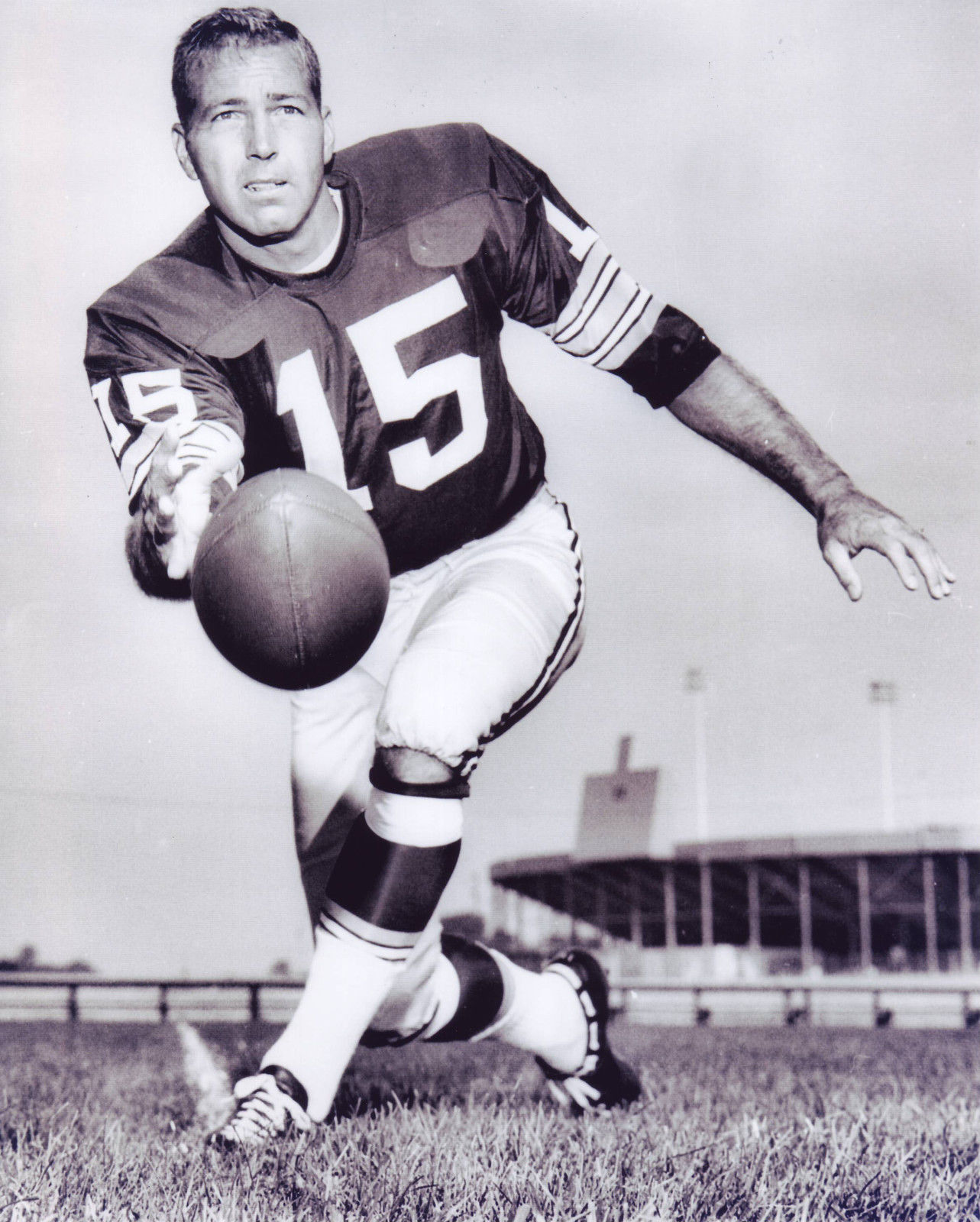
Bart Starr

=== 1933 to present ===
The following players were the starting quarterbacks for the Crimson Tide each season since joining the Southeastern Conference in 1933.

Name	Season(s) Started	Notability	References
Keelon Russell	2026		
Ty Simpson	2025	Simpson started every game of the 2025 season after having served as a backup for three seasons. He set the Alabama record for lowest interception percentage at 0.956 having thrown only five career interceptions in 523 pass attempts.	
Jalen Milroe	2022–2024	As a redshirt freshman in 2022, Milroe got the start against Texas A&M in place of an injured Bryce Young. Milroe would throw three touchdown passes in the Tide's 24–20 win.	
Tyler Buchner	2023	Buchner started one game in 2023 against South Florida after a loss to Texas in the previous week led the team to bench Jalen Milroe. He was replaced by Ty Simpson before halftime, and did not appear in any other games before entering the transfer portal as a lacrosse player at the end of the season.	
Bryce Young	2021–2022	As a sophomore in 2021, led the Tide to the SEC championship and a Cotton Bowl victory. Young became the first Alabama quarterback to win the Heisman Trophy.	
Mac Jones	2019–2020	Mac Jones became the starting quarterback the week after Tua Tagovailoa suffered a season-ending injury against Southeastern Conference rival Mississippi State on November 16, 2019. Jones led Alabama to win the College Football National Championship in 2020. Jones broke Alabama's single-season passing yards record (4,514) and broke the FBS single-season record for completion percentage (77.4%).	
Tua Tagovailoa	2018–2019	Tua Tagovailoa won critical acclaim for his 2nd half performance in the 2018 College Football Playoff National Championship where he led Alabama to a come-from-behind overtime win against the Georgia Bulldogs. Tagovailoa won the starting job in the 2018 off-season and started his first game on September 1 against the Louisville Cardinals	
Jalen Hurts	2016–2017	Hurts was the first freshman to start at QB for Nick Saban. He led Alabama to the 2017 College Football Playoff National Championship game, which Alabama lost to Clemson, 35–31. In the 2017 season, he led Alabama to the 2018 College Football Playoff National Championship, where he was replaced during the game by Tua Tagovailoa.	
Blake Barnett	2016	Barnett started the first game of the 2016 season against USC. He was replaced by Jalen Hurts, who became the starting quarterback. After limited playing time in the next few games, Barnett chose to leave the program and transfer to a junior college, and then to Arizona State where he was the backup QB behind Manny Wilkins. He was then the starting QB for the University of South Florida Bulls.	
Cooper Bateman	2015	Bateman made his first career start at quarterback September 19, 2015	
Jake Coker	2015	Coker led Alabama to the 2016 national championship, where they defeated Clemson, 45–40.	
Blake Sims	2014	Sims was named starting quarterback just prior to their season opener against West Virginia after he won a prolonged competition against Jake Coker. Against Florida, Sims set a school record for total offense in a single game with his 484 yards that included 39 total yards rushing. Sims threw for 3,487 yards (a single season record) with 28 touchdowns. He also added 7 rushing touchdowns and 350 yards on the ground. He led the Tide to win the 2014 SEC Championship, in which he was the game's MVP.	
A. J. McCarron	2011–2013	McCarron led the Crimson Tide to the 2011 and 2012 national championships and graduated as Alabama's career leader in passing yardage (9,019), completions (686) and touchdowns (77). He also holds the record for passing touchdowns (30) in a single season. He finished runner-up for the Heisman Trophy in the 2013 season. He was drafted by the Cincinnati Bengals in the 2014 NFL draft.	
Greg McElroy	2009–2010	McElroy led the Crimson Tide to the 2009 national championship and was named ESPN Academic All-American of the Year for the 2010 season. He was drafted by the New York Jets in the 2011 NFL draft.	
John Parker Wilson	2006–2008	Wilson graduated as the all-time leader in several categories that have since been eclipsed. He still holds the record for completions in a single-season (255). He went undrafted but played in the NFL for the Atlanta Falcons, Jacksonville Jaguars and Pittsburgh Steelers.	
Brodie Croyle	2002–2005	Croyle graduated as the all-time leader in several categories that have since been eclipsed. He was drafted by the Kansas City Chiefs in the 2006 NFL draft.	
Mark Guillon	2004	Guillon started a pair of games during the 2004 season after Brodie Croyle had a season-ending injury. He subsequently left the program in October 2006.	
Spencer Pennington	2003–2004	He made his first career start October 4, 2003. Pennington started the final seven games of the 2004 season after injuries to both Brodie Croyle and Mark Guillon. He left the program in January 2005 to focus only on his baseball career with the Crimson Tide.	
Brandon Avalos	2003	Avalos started against Southern Miss during the 2003 season due to injuries to both Brodie Croyle and Spencer Pennington. He left the program in January 2004.	
Tyler Watts	1999–2002		
Andrew Zow	1998–2001	Led Alabama to a SEC Championship in 1999 and finished his career as the all time passing yards leader (now 4th).	
John David Phillips	1998	As a fifth year senior, Phillips started the first four games of the season before being replaced by Andrew Zow for the year.	
Lance Tucker	1997		
Freddie Kitchens	1995–1997		
Brian Burgdorf	1993, 1995		
Jay Barker	1991–1994	All-SEC. Barker led Alabama the 1992 national championship. He was drafted by the Green Bay Packers in the fifth round of the 1995 NFL draft.	
Danny Woodson	1991		
Gary Hollingsworth	1989–1990		
David Smith	1987–1988		
Jeff Dunn	1987–1989		
Vince Sutton	1987–1988, 1984		
Mike Shula	1984–1986		
Walter Lewis	1981–1983	Lewis was the first black quarterback to start for the Crimson Tide and led Alabama during the final three seasons of the Bryant era.	
Alan Gray	1981		
Ken Coley	1981		
Don Jacobs	1980		
Steadman S. Shealy	1979	All-SEC. Shealy led the Crimson Tide to an undefeated season and the 1979 national championship.	
Jeff Rutledge	1976–1978		
Richard Todd	1974–1975	Todd was drafted by the New York Jets in the first round of the 1976 NFL draft.	
Gary Rutledge	1973	Rutledge was the first of two brothers to lead a national championship team. He led Alabama to the 1973 national championship and his brother Jeff Rutledge led Alabama to the 1978 national championship.	
Terry Davis	1971–1972		
Neb Hayden	1970		
Scott Hunter	1968–1970		
Wayne Trimble	1966		
Ken Stabler	1966–1967	All-SEC. Super Bowl XI Champion. Pro Football Hall of Fame.	
Steve Sloan	1962–1965		
Joe Namath	1962–1964	All-SEC. Pro Football Hall of Fame. Super Bowl III Champion.	
Pat Trammell	1959–1961		
Bobby Jackson	1958		
Bobby Smith	1956–1957		
Clay Walls	1956		
Bart Starr	1953–1955	Pro Football Hall of Fame. NFL 1960s All-Decade Team. Two-time Super Bowl Champion and MVP (Most Valuable Player). At Alabama, he also played punter.	
Clell Hobson	1951–1952		
Ed Salem	1948–1950		
Butch Avinger	1949–1950		
Jack Brown	1948		
Hugh Morrow	1947		
Hal Self	1945–1946		
Harry Gilmer	1944–1947	All-SEC	
Jim McWhorter	1941–1942	1941 team won Cotton Bowl and national championship. 1942 team won Orange Bowl. Drafted by Detroit Lions after WWII service.	
Chuck DeShane	1939–1940		
Hal Hughes	1937–1938		
Vic Bradford	1936–1938	Outfielder in Major League Baseball.	
Joe Riley	1936	All-SEC	
Riley Smith	1934–1935	All-SEC	
Tilden Campbell	1932–1934		

=== 1922 to 1932 ===
Red Barnes

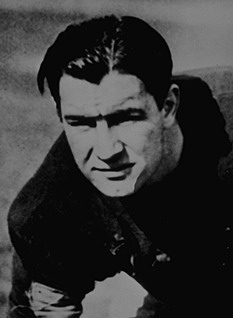
Pooley Hubert

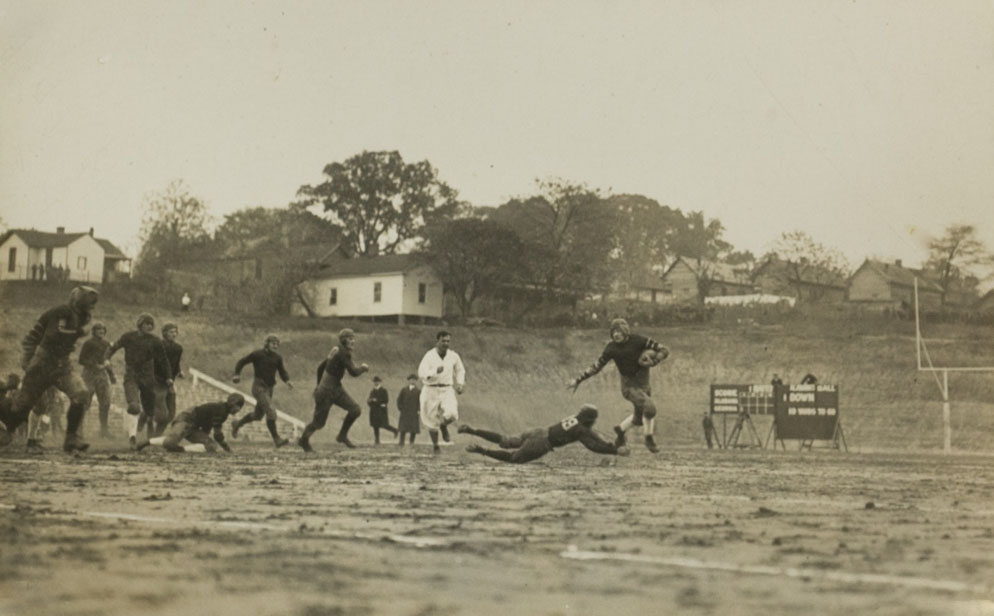
Charles Bartlett running vs. Georgia.

The following players were the predominant quarterbacks for the Crimson Tide each season after the establishment of the Southern Conference until the establishment of the Southeastern Conference.

Name	Years Started	Notability	References
John Campbell	1930–1931	A member of Wallace Wade's last national championship team in 1930.	
John Tucker	1930–1931	A member of Wallace Wade's last national championship team in 1930.	
Melvin Vines	1929		
Graham McClintock	1927–1928		
Davis Brasfield	1927		
Red Barnes	1925–1926	Barnes was a member of the first southern team to win the Rose Bowl, playing then as a halfback. Major League Baseball player for the Washington Senators.	
Allison Hubert	1924–1925	Hubert is the first quarterback for the Crimson Tide to win a national championship. He was All-Southern, a member of the first southern team to win the Rose Bowl, and inducted into the College Football Hall of Fame in 1964. Coach Wallace Wade called him "undoubtedly one of the greatest football players of all time."	
Grant Gillis	1923–1924	Gillis was the first quarterback under Wallace Wade, and so is the first quarterback for the Crimson Tide to win a conference championship, and the first to be selected composite All-Southern. He was later a Major League Baseball player.	
Charles Bartlett	1920–1922	Bartlett led the Tide to a 9–7 upset win over coach John Heisman's Penn team in 1922, one of the first times the Tide received national coverage in the newspapers. He was selected to some All-Southern teams, and received Walter Camp's All-America Honorable Mention.	

=== 1895 to 1921 ===
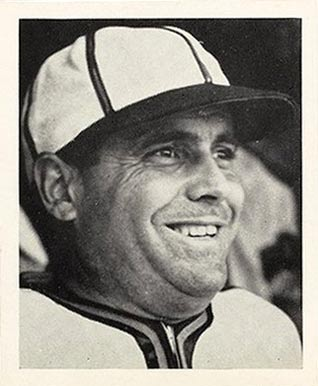
Luke Sewell with the St. Louis Browns.

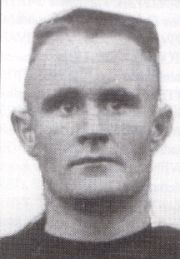
Mullie Lenoir

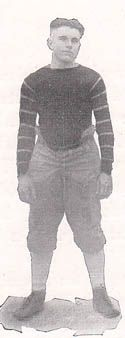
Cecil Creen

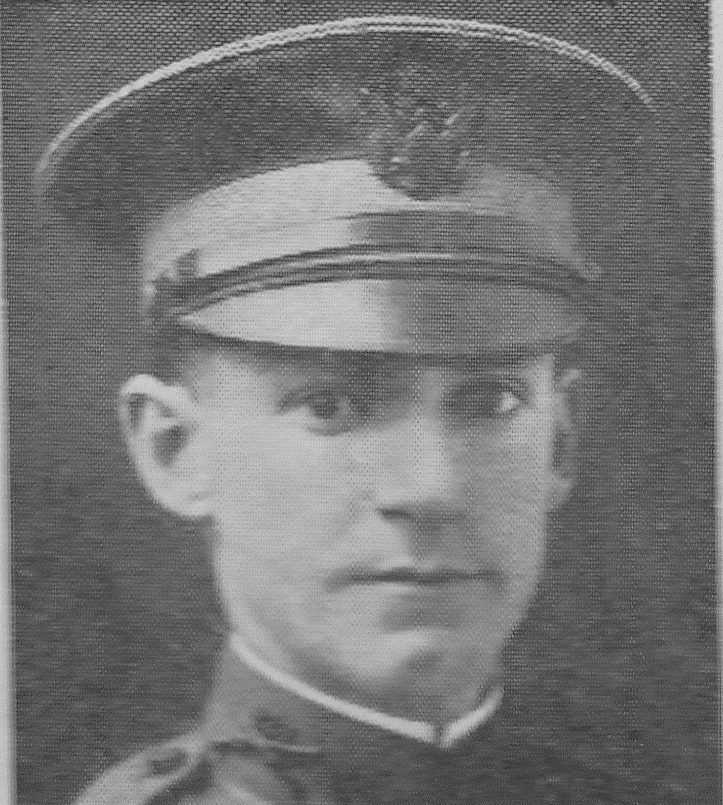
Farley Moody

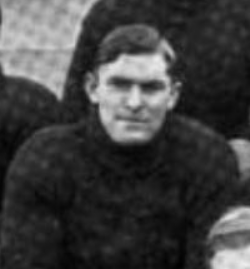
Tutwiler cropped from Virginia team picture

The following players were the predominant quarterbacks for the Crimson Tide each season after the establishment of the Southern Intercollegiate Athletic Association until the establishment of the Southern Conference.

Name	Years Started	Notability	References
Max Rosenfeld	1921	Major League Baseball player for the Brooklyn Dodgers.	
William C. Baty	1921		
Jack Hovater	1920	Captain of 1917 team.	
Luke Sewell	1919	Played in Major League Baseball as a catcher.	
Mullie Lenoir	1917	Was an All-Southern halfback in 1919 and 1920. Later coach at Bluefield.	
Dink Hagan	1913; 1917		
Cecil Creen	1916	Creen ran in the touchdown to defeat Mississippi College 13 to 7. All-Southern. Walter Camp gave him All-America honorable mention. He transferred to Washington & Lee.	
Griffin Harsh	1914–1915		
Charlie Joplin	1912;1914	Joplin was ruled ineligible because he refused to sign an affidavit stating that he had never played professional baseball. He was killed in the First World War.	
Farley Moody	1909–1912	He made the field goal to beat Tulane 5 to 3 in 1910. Moody scored two touchdowns, including a 40-yard punt return, and added four extra points in the 24 to 0 win over Howard in 1911. He coached the 1915 team with athletic director B. L. Noojin after coach Kelley was hospitalized with typhoid fever. Moody was killed in the First World War.	
Emory Peebles	1908–1910		
Emile Hannon	1906–1907	Nicknamed "Chick." Weighed just 120 pounds. Assistant coach for Bama c. 1913.	
Truman Smith	1905		
W. L. Ward	1904		
W. S. Wyatt	1902–1903	Later a doctor in Lexington, Kentucky	
Earl Drennen	1900–1901		
Forney Johnston	1899		
Ed Tutwiler	1897	Transferred to the University of Virginia. Son of Birmingham philanthropist and New Market cadet Edward Magruder Tutwiler and relative of reformer Julia Tutwiler who is the namesake of Tutwiler Hall. One account reads "Ed Tutwiler is one of the greatest stars that football in the south ever produced. He was a graduate of the University in the class of '98, and afterwards went to the University of Virginia. He was considered the pluckiest quarterback in the south, and was noted for head work and generalship."	
Borden Burr	1895–1896	Later a corporate lawyer.	

=== 1892 to 1894 ===
The following players were the predominant quarterbacks for the Crimson Tide each season the team was a non-conference independent, following the birth of Alabama football.

Name	Years Started	Notability	References
William Walker	1892–1894	Later a distinguished judge in Birmingham	
