= Charles Cary =

Charles Cary may refer to:

- Charles Cary, 9th Viscount Falkland (1768–1809), peer and Royal Navy captain
- Charles P. Cary (1856–1943), American educator
- Charles S. Cary (1827–1906), New York lawyer, politician and railroad executive
- Charles Allen Cary (1861–1935), American veterinarian
