= Thomas E. Stidham =

American football player, coach, and administrator (1905–1964)

Biographical details
- Born: March 25, 1905; Checotah, Oklahoma, U.S.
- Died: January 29, 1964 (aged 58); Milwaukee, Wisconsin, U.S.

Playing career
- 1924–1926: Haskell
- Position: Tackle

Coaching career (HC unless noted)
- 1927–1934: Northwestern (assistant)
- 1935–1936: Oklahoma (line)
- 1937–1940: Oklahoma
- 1941–1945: Marquette
- 1946: Buffalo Bills (AAFC) (line)
- 1947–1948: Baltimore Colts (AAFC) (line)
- 1949: Green Bay Packers (line)

Administrative career (AD unless noted)
- 1937–1941: Oklahoma

Head coaching record
- Overall: 47–30–5
- Bowls: 0–1

Accomplishments and honors

Championships
- 1 Big Six (1938)

Thomas E. Stidham (March 25, 1905 – January 29, 1964) was an American football player, coach, and college athletics administrator. He served as the head football coach at the University of Oklahoma from 1937 to 1940 and Marquette University from 1941 to 1945, compiling a career record of 47–30–5.

== Coaching career ==
Stidham was the head coach of the Oklahoma Sooners football program from 1937 to 1940. During his tenure there, he compiled a 27–8–3 (.750) record. His best season came in 1938, when his team went 10–1, losing only to Tennessee, 17–0, in the Orange Bowl.

Stidham was the 15th head football coach at Marquette University and he held that position for five seasons, from 1941 until 1945. His coaching record at Marquette was 20–22–2.

== Head coaching record ==
Year	Team	Overall	Conference	Standing	Bowl/playoffs	AP^{#}
Oklahoma Sooners (Big Six Conference) (1937–1940)
1937	Oklahoma	5–2–2	3–1–1	2nd		
1938	Oklahoma	10–1	5–0	1st	L Orange	4
1939	Oklahoma	6–2–1	3–2	3rd		19
1940	Oklahoma	6–3	4–1	2nd		
Oklahoma:		27–8–3	15–4–1			
Marquette Hilltoppers (Independent) (1941–1945)
1941	Marquette	4–5				
1942	Marquette	7–2				
1943	Marquette	4–5				
1944	Marquette	4–5				
1945	Marquette	4–5				
Marquette:		20–22–2				
Total:		47–30–5				
National championship Conference title Conference division title or championship game berth
^{#}Rankings from final AP Poll.
