= 1938 Alabama Crimson Tide football team =

American college football season

1938 Alabama Crimson Tide football
- Conference: Southeastern Conference

Ranking
- AP: No. 13
- Record: 7–1–1 (4–1–1 SEC)
- Head coach: Frank Thomas (8th season)
- Captain: Lew Bostick
- Home stadium: Denny Stadium; Legion Field

1938 Southeastern Conference football standings
	Conf.					Overall
Team		W		L			W		L
No. 2 Tennessee $	7	–	0	–	0	11	–	0	–	0
No. 13 Alabama	4	–	1	–	1	7	–	1	–	1
No. 19 Tulane	4	–	1	–	1	7	–	2	–	1
Ole Miss	3	–	2	–	0	9	–	2	–	0
Georgia Tech	2	–	1	–	3	3	–	4	–	3
Vanderbilt	4	–	3	–	0	6	–	3	–	0
Florida	2	–	2	–	1	4	–	6	–	1
Auburn	3	–	3	–	1	4	–	5	–	1
Georgia	1	–	2	–	1	5	–	4	–	1
LSU	2	–	4	–	0	6	–	4	–	0
Mississippi State	1	–	4	–	0	4	–	6	–	0
Kentucky	0	–	4	–	0	2	–	7	–	0
Sewanee	0	–	6	–	0	1	–	8	–	0
$ – Conference champion; Rankings from AP Poll

The 1938 Alabama Crimson Tide football team (variously "Alabama", "UA" or "Bama") represented the University of Alabama in the 1938 college football season. It was the Crimson Tide's 45th overall and 6th season as a member of the Southeastern Conference (SEC). The team was led by head coach Frank Thomas, in his eighth year, and played their home games at Denny Stadium in Tuscaloosa and Legion Field in Birmingham, Alabama. They finished the season with a record of seven wins, one loss and one tie (7–1–1 overall, 4–1–1 in the SEC).

The Crimson Tide opened the season with a 19–7 victory in an intersectional contest against USC at Los Angeles. They then followed up the win with consecutive shutouts, home victories over non-conference opponents Howard and NC State on homecoming. However, Alabama then was shut out 13–0 by Tennessee, their first loss against the Volunteers since 1932. The Crimson Tide then rebounded with victories against Sewanee, Kentucky and Tulane. After a 14–14 tie against Georgia Tech, Alabama defeated Vanderbilt in their season finale.

With a final record of 7–1–1, Alabama was ranked No. 13 in the final AP Poll of the season. Additionally, after the season the Associated Press recognized Alabama as having the best record (40–4–3) and highest winning percentage (.909) of any major college team for the five-year period between 1934 and 1938. Statistically, the defense was one of the most dominant in school history and still holds numerous defense records.

== Schedule ==
On December 5, 1937, Frank Thomas announced the 1938 schedule. The intersectional game against USC was announced in August 1937 and was the first between the two football powers. The remaining schedule included road games at Kentucky and Georgia Tech with the remaining three games split evenly between Denny Stadium and Legion Field.

Date	Opponent	Rank	Site	Result	Attendance	Source
September 24	at USC*		Los Angeles Memorial Coliseum; Los Angeles, CA	W 19–7	70,000	
October 1	Howard (AL)*		Denny Stadium; Tuscaloosa, AL	W 34–0	8,000	
October 8	NC State*^{†}		Denny Stadium; Tuscaloosa, AL	W 14–0	10,000	
October 15	Tennessee		Legion Field; Birmingham, AL (rivalry)	L 0–13	25,000	
October 22	Sewanee	No. 15	Denny Stadium; Tuscaloosa, AL	W 32–0	5,000	
October 29	at Kentucky	No. 18	McLean Stadium; Lexington, KY	W 26–6	15,000	
November 5	Tulane	No. 15	Legion Field; Birmingham, AL	W 3–0	19,000	
November 12	at Georgia Tech	No. 16	Grant Field; Atlanta, GA (rivalry)	T 14–14	35,000	
November 24	Vanderbilt		Legion Field; Birmingham, AL	W 7–0	25,000	
*Non-conference game; ^{†}Homecoming; Rankings from AP Poll released prior to the game

== Game summaries ==
=== USC ===
Team	1	2	3	4	Total
• Alabama	0	13	0	6	19
USC	0	0	0	7	7

- Date: September 24
- Location: Los Angeles Memorial Coliseum
  Los Angeles, California
- Game attendance: 70,000

In August 1937, university officials announced Alabama would open the 1938 season in Los Angeles against the University of Southern California (USC). Looking for "revenge" after their January loss in the Rose Bowl, their first loss on the West Coast, the Crimson Tide defeated the Trojans 19–7 at the Los Angeles Memorial Coliseum. After a scoreless first quarter, Alabama scored two touchdowns in the second quarter to take a 13–0 halftime lead. The scores came on a pair of Herschel Mosley touchdown passes, the first on a seven-yard pass to Billy Slemons and the second on an 18-yard pass to Gene Blackwell. The Trojans responded after the first Alabama touchdown with their deepest drive into Crimson Tide territory of the game. On the drive, Robert Peoples connected with Grenny Lansdell for a 36-yard gain to the Alabama 22. However, the Alabama defense held, and USC failed to score after they turned the ball over on downs at the Alabama 13-yard line.

After they held their 13–0 lead through the third quarter, Hal Hughes intercepted an Oliver Day pass and returned it 25-yards for an Alabama touchdown to make the score 19–0 after Vic Bradford missed his second extra point of the game. Later in the fourth, the Trojans scored their only points of the game. The one-yard Day touchdown run was set up after Al Krueger recovered Charley Boswell fumbled punt at the Alabama one-yard line. Over 6,000 fans greeted the team at the Alabama Great Southern Railroad station in downtown Tuscaloosa upon their arrival the following Tuesday to celebrate their victory.

=== Howard (AL) ===
Team	1	2	3	4	Total
Howard	0	0	0	0	0
• Alabama	7	13	7	7	34

- Date: October 1
- Location: Denny Stadium
  Tuscaloosa, Alabama
- Game attendance: 8,000

A week after their intersectional victory over USC to open the season, Alabama hosted Howard (now Samford University) in their home opener. In the game, the Crimson Tide outgained the Bulldogs in rushing yards 354 to 8 in their 34–0 shutout at Denny Stadium. Alabama scored their first touchdown on a 15-yard Billy Slemons run to take a 7–0 first quarter lead. In the second quarter touchdowns were scored by, George Zivich on a 43-yard run and by Alvin Davis on a 56-yard run to extend the Alabama lead to 20–0 at halftime. The Crimson Tide then closed the game with a pair of second half touchdowns for the 34–0 victory. Davis scored in the third on a two-yard run and Charlie Holm scored in the fourth on a three-yard run. Davis starred for Alabama in the game with his 153 yards rushing on 15 attempts with a pair of touchdowns.

=== NC State ===
Team	1	2	3	4	Total
NC State	0	0	0	0	0
• Alabama	0	14	0	0	14

- Date: October 8
- Location: Denny Stadium
  Tuscaloosa, Alabama
- Game attendance: 10,000

In their third and final non-conference game of the season, Alabama hosted North Carolina State University (NC State) in their annual homecoming contest. In the game, the Crimson Tide's two second touchdowns were enough in their defeat of the Wolfpack in their 14–0 shutout at Denny Stadium. After they were held without a first down in the opening quarter, Alabama scored the only points of the game with their two second-quarter touchdowns. The first was on a 28-yard Herschel Mosley pass to Erin Warren and the second on a seven-yard Mosley touchdown run. The Alabama defense dominated the Wolfpack offense and allowed negative rushing yardage (minus four) and zero yards passing. On offense, Mosley starred for the Crimson Tide with his 123 rushing yards on 15 attempts and one passing and rushing touchdown.

=== Tennessee ===
Third Saturday in October

Team	1	2	3	4	Total
• Tennessee	6	0	7	0	13
Alabama	0	0	0	0	0

- Date: October 15
- Location: Legion Field
  Birmingham, Alabama
- Game attendance: 25,000

In Birmingham, Alabama was upset by rival Tennessee 13–0 at Legion Field. Leonard Coffman scored both of the Volunteers' touchdowns on one-yard runs in the first and third quarters. George Cafego also starred for Tennessee with his 120 rushing yards on 17 attempts that included separate runs of 48 and 33 yards. The loss was Alabama's first against Tennessee since the 1932 season.

=== Sewanee ===
Team	1	2	3	4	Total
Sewanee	0	0	0	0	0
• #15 Alabama	0	7	6	19	32

- Date: October 22
- Location: Denny Stadium
  Tuscaloosa, Alabama
- Game attendance: 5,000

A week after their loss to Tennessee, Alabama defeated the Sewanee Tigers 32–0 at Denny Stadium. After a scoreless first quarter, Alabama took a 7–0 lead in the second after Vic Bradford scored on a one-yard quarterback sneak. Later in the quarter, a 51-yard Alvin Davis touchdown run was called back due to a holding penalty, and he Crimson Tide led 7–0 at the half. After Dallas Wicke scored on a one-yard run in the third, Alabama scored 19 fourth quarter points for the 32–0 win. In the fourth, Charley Boswell had a pair of rushing touchdowns and threw a third to Erin Warren in the win.

=== Kentucky ===
Team	1	2	3	4	Total
• #18 Alabama	14	0	6	6	26
Kentucky	0	6	0	0	6

- Date: October 29
- Location: McLean Stadium
  Lexington, Kentucky
- Game attendance: 15,000

As Alabama entered their contest against Kentucky, they entered the rankings at No. 18 in the weekly AP Poll. In the game, the Crimson Tide defeated the Wildcats 26–6 on homecoming at McLean Stadium. Alabama opened the game with a pair of touchdowns to take a 14–0 lead in the first quarter. Charlie Holm scored first on a one-yard run and Vic Bradford scored the second on a 31-yard touchdown reception from Herschel Mosley. Kentucky responded in the second with their only points on a 71-yard Dave Zoeller touchdown run to cut the Alabama lead to 14–6 at the half. The Crimson Tide then scored on a pair of Mosley touchdown passes in the second half. The first came on a six-yard pass to Bradford in the third and the second on a nine-yard pass to Erin Warren in the fourth.

=== Tulane ===
Team	1	2	3	4	Total
Tulane	0	0	0	0	0
• #15 Alabama	0	0	0	3	3

- Date: November 5
- Location: Legion Field
  Birmingham, Alabama
- Game attendance: 19,000

After their victory over Kentucky, the Crimson Tide moved up three positions to the No. 15 spot in the weekly poll. In the game, the Crimson Tide defeated the Tulane Green Wave 3–0 after Vic Bradford converted a game-winning, 17-yard field goal late in the fourth quarter.

=== Georgia Tech ===
Team	1	2	3	4	Total
#16 Alabama	0	0	7	7	14
Georgia Tech	14	0	0	0	14

- Date: November 12
- Location: Grant Field
  Atlanta
- Game attendance: 35,000

After their close victory over Tulane, the Crimson Tide dropped one position to the No. 16 spot in the weekly poll. In their game against Georgia Tech Alabama fell behind 14–0 after the first quarter, but a pair of second half touchdowns gave the Crimson Tide a 14–14 tie against the Yellow Jackets at Grant Field. Georgia Tech took an early 14–0 lead after W. C. Gibson threw a 16-yard touchdown pass to George Smith and W. H. Ector scored on a two-yard run. Still down 14–0 as they entered the third quarter, Alabama scored their first points of the game on a three-yard Alvin Davis touchdown run to cap a 57-yard drive. The Crimson Tide then tied the game in the fourth when they executed a hook and lateral play, with Davis crossing the endzone line for a 66-yard touchdown. Alabama was then in position to attempt a game-winning field goal from the Jackets' 15; however, time expired before they could get a play off which resulted in the 14–14 tie.

=== Vanderbilt ===
Team	1	2	3	4	Total
Vanderbilt	0	0	0	0	0
• Alabama	0	0	0	7	7

- Date: November 24
- Location: Legion Field
  Birmingham, Alabama
- Game attendance: 25,000

In their season finale against the Vanderbilt Commodores, Alabama won 7–0 at Legion Field on Thanksgiving Day. The only scoring drive began in the third and ended early in the fourth with a two-yard Vic Bradford touchdown run. Bradford's extra point was then blocked, but George Zivich recovered it and took it in for the point to give Alabama the 7–0 lead.

== After the season ==
After all of the regular season games were completed, the final AP Poll was released in early December. In the final poll, Alabama held the No. 13 position. Alabama was also recognized by the Associated Press for having the best record (40–4–3) and highest winning percentage (.909) of any major, college team for the five-year period between 1934 and 1938.

Statistically, the 1938 defense was one of the best in school history. The 1938 squad still holds numerous defensive records that include:

- Fewest total yards allowed in a season with 701
- Fewest total yards allowed per game with an average of 77.9
- Fewest total yards allowed per play with an average of 1.2
- Fewest first downs allowed in a season with 26
- Fewest rushing yards allowed in a season with 305
- Fewest rushing yards allowed per game with an average of 33.9
- Fewest rushing yards allowed per play with an average of 0.95
- Fewest passing attempts allowed per game with an average of 9.8
- Fewest passing completions allowed per game with an average of 3.4
- Fewest passing yards allowed in a season with 291
- Fewest passing yards allowed per game with an average of 32.7

=== NFL draft ===
Several players that were varsity lettermen from the 1938 squad were drafted into the National Football League (NFL) between the 1939 and 1941 drafts. These players included the following:

Year	Round	Overall	Player name	Position	NFL team
1939	3	23	Charlie Holm	Back	Washington Redskins
1939	9	73	Lew Bostick	Guard	Cleveland Rams
1940	4	30	Bobby Wood	Tackle	Cleveland Rams
1940	5	34	Walt Merrill	Tackle	Brooklyn Dodgers
1940	11	93	Cary Cox	Center	Pittsburgh Steelers
1940	11	138	Hayward Sanford	End	Washington Redskins
1941	3	25	Fred Davis	Tackle	Washington Redskins
1941	7	58	Hal Newman	End	Brooklyn Dodgers
1941	10	90	Ed Hickerson	Guard	Washington Redskins

== Personnel ==
=== Varsity letter winners ===
Player	Hometown	Position
Warren Averitte	Greenville, Mississippi	Center
Silas Beard	Guntersville, Alabama	Halfback
Gene Blackwell	Blytheville, Arkansas	End
Lewis Bostick	Birmingham, Alabama	Guard
Charley Boswell	Birmingham, Alabama	Halfback
Vic Bradford	Memphis, Tennessee	Quarterback
Carey Cox	Bainbridge, Georgia	Center
Alvin Davis	Green Forest, Arkansas	Fullback
Fred Davis	Louisville, Kentucky	Tackle
Jess Foshee	Clanton, Alabama	Guard
Jack Gornto	Valdosta, Georgia	End
Grover Harkins	Gadsden, Alabama	Guard
Ed Hickerson	Ventura, California	Guard
Charlie Holm	Birmingham, Alabama	Halfback
Hal Hughes	Pine Bluff, Arkansas	Quarterback
Walter Merrill	Andalusia, Alabama	Tackle
Herschel Mosley	Blytheville, Arkansas	Halfback
Hal Newman	Birmingham, Alabama	End
Jake Redden	Vernon, Alabama	Guard
Perron Shoemaker	Birmingham, Alabama	End
Billy Slemons	Orlando, Florida	Halfback
Joseph Sugg	Russellville, Alabama	Guard
W. L. Waites	Tuscaloosa, Alabama	Halfback
Erin Warren	Montgomery, Alabama	End
Dallas Wicke	Pensacola, Florida	Quarterback
Bobby Wood	McComb, Mississippi	Tackle
George Zivich	East Chicago, Indiana	Halfback

=== Coaching staff ===
Name	Position	Seasons at Alabama	Alma mater
Frank Thomas	Head coach	8	Notre Dame (1923)
Bear Bryant	Assistant coach	3	Alabama (1935)
Paul Burnum	Assistant coach	9	Alabama (1922)
Tilden Campbell	Assistant coach	3	Alabama (1935)
Hank Crisp	Assistant coach	18	VPI (1920)
Harold Drew	Assistant coach	8	Bates (1916)
Joe Kilgrow	Assistant coach	1	Alabama (1937)
