= 1938 All-SEC football team =

American college football all-star team

The 1938 All-SEC football team consists of American football players selected to the All-Southeastern Conference (SEC) chosen by various selectors for the 1938 college football season. Tennessee won the conference.

== All-SEC selections ==
=== Ends ===
- Bowden Wyatt, Tennessee (College Football Hall of Fame) (AP-1, UP-1)
- Ken Kavanaugh, LSU (College Football Hall of Fame) (AP-1, UP-2)
- Marvin Franklin, Vanderbilt (AP-2, UP-1)
- Ralph Wenzel, Tulane (AP-2, UP-2)

=== Tackles ===
- Eddie Gatto, LSU (AP-1, UP-1)
- Bo Russell, Auburn (AP-1, UP-1)
- Maurice Holdgraff, Vanderbilt (AP-2, UP-2)
- Ray Miller, Tulane (AP-2)
- Abe Shires, Tennessee (UP-2)

=== Guards ===
- Bob Suffridge, Tennessee (College Football Hall of Fame) (AP-1, UP-1)
- James L. Brooks, Georgia Tech (AP-1)
- Lou Bostick, Alabama (UP-1)
- John W. Goree, LSU (AP-2)
- Milton Howell, Auburn (AP-2)
- Ed Molinski, Tennessee (College Football Hall of Fame) (UP-2)
- Frank Koscis, Florida (UP-2)

=== Centers ===
- Jack Chivington, Georgia Tech (AP-2, UP-1)
- Quinton Lumpkin, Georgia (AP-1)
- Cary Cox, Alabama (UP-2)

=== Quarterbacks ===
- George Cafego, Tennessee (College Football Hall of Fame) (AP-1, UP-1)
- Vic Bradford, Alabama (AP-2)
- Bradley, Ole Miss (UP-2)

=== Halfbacks ===
- Parker Hall, Ole Miss (College Football Hall of Fame) (AP-1, UP-1)
- Warren Brunner, Tulane (AP-1, UP-1)
- Spec Kelly, Auburn (AP-2, UP-2)
- Dave Zoeller, Kentucky (AP-2)
- Howard Ector, Georgia Tech (UP-2)

=== Fullbacks ===
- Charlie Holm, Alabama (AP-1, UP-1)
- Len Coffman, Tennessee (AP-2)
- Fordham, Georgia (UP-2)

== Key ==
AP = Associated Press.

UP = United Press

Bold = Consensus first-team selection by both AP and UP

== See also ==
- 1938 College Football All-America Team
