= 1938 Vanderbilt Commodores football team =

American college football season

1938 Vanderbilt Commodores football
- Conference: Southeastern Conference
- Record: 6–3 (4–3 SEC)
- Head coach: Ray Morrison (5th season)
- Captain: Marvin Franklin
- Home stadium: Dudley Field

1938 Southeastern Conference football standings
| | Conf. | | | | | Overall |
| Team | | W | | L | | | W | | L |
|---|---|---|---|---|---|---|---|---|---|---|
| No. 2 Tennessee $ | 7 | – | 0 | – | 0 | 11 | – | 0 | – | 0 |
| No. 13 Alabama | 4 | – | 1 | – | 1 | 7 | – | 1 | – | 1 |
| No. 19 Tulane | 4 | – | 1 | – | 1 | 7 | – | 2 | – | 1 |
| Ole Miss | 3 | – | 2 | – | 0 | 9 | – | 2 | – | 0 |
| Georgia Tech | 2 | – | 1 | – | 3 | 3 | – | 4 | – | 3 |
| Vanderbilt | 4 | – | 3 | – | 0 | 6 | – | 3 | – | 0 |
| Florida | 2 | – | 2 | – | 1 | 4 | – | 6 | – | 1 |
| Auburn | 3 | – | 3 | – | 1 | 4 | – | 5 | – | 1 |
| Georgia | 1 | – | 2 | – | 1 | 5 | – | 4 | – | 1 |
| LSU | 2 | – | 4 | – | 0 | 6 | – | 4 | – | 0 |
| Mississippi State | 1 | – | 4 | – | 0 | 4 | – | 6 | – | 0 |
| Kentucky | 0 | – | 4 | – | 0 | 2 | – | 7 | – | 0 |
| Sewanee | 0 | – | 6 | – | 0 | 1 | – | 8 | – | 0 |
$ – Conference champion; Rankings from AP Poll

The 1938 Vanderbilt Commodores football team represented Vanderbilt University during the 1938 college football season. The Commodores were led by Ray Morrison, who served in the fourth season of his second stint, and fifth overall, as head coach. As a member of the Southeastern Conference, Vanderbilt went 6–3 overall and 4–3 in conference play.

== Schedule ==
| Date | Opponent | Rank | Site | Result | Attendance | Source |
|---|---|---|---|---|---|---|
| September 24 | at Washington University* | | Francis Field; St. Louis, MO | W 20–0 | 5,000 | |
| October 1 | Western Kentucky State Teachers* | | Dudley Field; Nashville, TN | W 12–0 | 7,000 | |
| October 8 | at Kentucky | | McLean Stadium; Lexington, KY (rivalry) | W 14–7 | 13,500 | |
| October 15 | Ole Miss | | Dudley Field; Nashville, TN (rivalry) | W 13–7 | 15,000 | |
| October 22 | at LSU | No. 16 | Tiger Stadium; Baton Rouge, LA | L 0–7 | 35,000 | |
| October 29 | Georgia Tech | | Dudley Field; Nashville, TN (rivalry) | W 13–7 | 17,000 | |
| November 5 | Sewanee | | Dudley Field; Nashville, TN (rivalry) | W 14–0 | 7,000 | |
| November 12 | No. 4 Tennessee | | Dudley Field; Nashville, TN (rivalry) | L 0–14 | 23,000 | |
| November 24 | Alabama | | Legion Field; Birmingham, AL | L 0–7 | 25,000 | |
*Non-conference game; Rankings from AP Poll released prior to the game
