= 1938 Ole Miss Rebels football team =

American college football season

1938 Ole Miss Rebels football
- Conference: Southeastern Conference
- Head coach: Harry Mehre (1st season)
- Home stadium: Hemingway Stadium

1938 Southeastern Conference football standings
	Conf.					Overall
Team		W		L			W		L
No. 2 Tennessee $	7	–	0	–	0	11	–	0	–	0
No. 13 Alabama	4	–	1	–	1	7	–	1	–	1
No. 19 Tulane	4	–	1	–	1	7	–	2	–	1
Ole Miss	3	–	2	–	0	9	–	2	–	0
Georgia Tech	2	–	1	–	3	3	–	4	–	3
Vanderbilt	4	–	3	–	0	6	–	3	–	0
Florida	2	–	2	–	1	4	–	6	–	1
Auburn	3	–	3	–	1	4	–	5	–	1
Georgia	1	–	2	–	1	5	–	4	–	1
LSU	2	–	4	–	0	6	–	4	–	0
Mississippi State	1	–	4	–	0	4	–	6	–	0
Kentucky	0	–	4	–	0	2	–	7	–	0
Sewanee	0	–	6	–	0	1	–	8	–	0
$ – Conference champion; Rankings from AP Poll

The 1938 Ole Miss Rebels football team was an American football team that represented the University of Mississippi (Ole Miss) as a member of the Southeastern Conference (SEC) during the 1938 college football season. In their first year under head coach Harry Mehre, the Rebels compiled an overall record of 9–2, with a conference record of 3–2, and finished fourth in the SEC.

== Schedule ==
Date	Opponent	Site	Result	Attendance	Source
September 24	at LSU	Tiger Stadium; Baton Rouge, LA (rivalry)	W 20–7	25,000	
October 1	Louisiana Tech*	Hemingway Stadium; Oxford, MS	W 27–7		
October 8	Mississippi State Teachers*	Hemingway Stadium; Oxford, MS	W 14–0		
October 15	at Vanderbilt	Dudley Field; Nashville, TN (rivalry)	L 7–13		
October 22	Centenary*	Hemingway Stadium; Oxford, MS	W 47–14		
October 29	at George Washington*	Griffith Stadium; Washington, DC	W 25–0		
November 5	at Saint Louis*	Walsh Stadium; St Louis, MO	W 14–12	8,429	
November 12	Sewanee	Hemingway Stadium; Oxford, MS	W 39–0		
November 16	vs. Arkansas*	Crump Stadium; Memphis, TN (rivalry)	W 20–14	12,000	
November 26	at Mississippi State	Scott Field; Starkville, MS (Egg Bowl)	W 19–6	15,000	
December 3	vs. No. 4 Tennessee	Crump Stadium; Memphis, TN (rivalry)	L 0–47		
*Non-conference game; Rankings from AP Poll released prior to the game
