= Alabama Hall of Fame =

The Alabama Hall of Fame was established by Act of Alabama No. 646 (1951) to recognize "worthy citizens of the state who rendered outstanding service or who won fame on account of their achievements as to make them exceptional in the history of Alabama". Its membership consists of people considered to be instrumental to the history of the state of Alabama, as selected by a nine-member board. The board was dissolved in 1990. The Hall of Fame plaques are located at the Alabama Department of Archives and History.

== Inductees ==
Name	Image	Birth–Death	Year	Area of achievement
Clement Comer Clay		(1789–1866)	1953	Statesman
Samuel Dale		(1772–1841)	1953	Pioneer frontiersman
William Crawford Gorgas		(1854–1920)	1953	Surgeon General of the United States Army
John Tyler Morgan		(1824–1927)	1953	United States Senator
Daniel Pratt		(1799–1873)	1953	Industrialist
Raphael Semmes		(1809–1877)	1953	Naval commander, captain of the CSS Alabama
James Marion Sims		(1813–1883)	1953	Pioneering gynecologist
Eugene Allen Smith		(1841–1927)	1953	Geologist
Julia Strudwick Tutwiler		(1841–1916)	1953	Educator, reformer
Joseph Wheeler		(1836–1906)	1953	Military commander, politician
Robert Lee Bullard		(1861–1947)	1954	World War I military commander
George Washington Stone		(1811–1894)	1954	Judge
John Allan Wyeth		(1845–1922)	1954	Physician, educator
Braxton Bragg Comer		(1848–1927)	1955	Industrialist, statesman
John Pelham		(1838–1863)	1955	Soldier
Booker Taliaferro Washington		(1856–1915)	1955	Educator, author
Charles Allen Cary		(1861–1935)	1957	Pioneer veterinarian
Walter L. Fleming		(1874–1932)	1957	Educator, historian
Oscar Wilder Underwood		(1862–1929)	1957	United States congressman
Evan Frank Allison		(1865–1937)	1961	Conservationist
Augusta Jane Evans Wilson		(1835–1909)	1961	Author
Jerome Cochrane		(1831–1896)	1961	Public health officer
William Luther Sibert		(1860–1935)	1961	Engineer, soldier
Peter Bryce		(1834–1892)	1965	Pioneer psychiatrist
Seale Harris		(1870–1957)	1965	Physician, medical journal editor
Charles A. Boswell		(1916–1995)	1972	World War II hero, blind golf champion

== See also ==
- Alabama Academy of Honor
