= Eddie Gatto =

American football player (1916–1944)

Profile
- Position: Tackle

Personal information
- Born: December 26, 1916; New Orleans, Louisiana, U.S.
- Died: June 9, 1944 (aged 27); Normandy, France †
- Listed height: 6 ft 0 in (1.83 m)
- Listed weight: 205 lb (93 kg)

Career information
- High school: S. J. Peters
- College: LSU (1935–1938)

Awards and highlights
- Third-team All-American (1937); 2× First-team All-SEC (1937, 1938)

Edward Thomas Gatto (December 26, 1916 – June 9, 1944) was an American football tackle who played for the LSU Tigers.

Gatto was born on December 26, 1916, in New Orleans, Louisiana. He attended high school at S. J. Peters before playing college football at LSU. While at LSU, he twice earned All-SEC and All-American honors. He also was the only player from the 1937 All-SEC team to earn a position on the 1938 squad. Mississippi State coach Spike Nelson described him as "one of the top notch tackles in the county" and Loyola coach Larry Mullins nominated him for the All-America team. Following his collegiate career, he was chosen as the 33rd pick in the 1939 NFL draft by the Cleveland Rams. He was LSU's fourth ever draft pick. He did not play with the Rams and was shortly afterwards drafted into the United States Army during World War II. He was part of the 4th Infantry Division, 22nd Infantry Regiment and the commander of "L" (Love) Company. He later achieved the rank of captain. Gatto partook in the D-Day invasion, landing on Omaha beach roughly 75 minutes after it began. Gatto was killed in action on June 9, 1944, in the Battle of Normandy. He was 27 at the time of his death.
