= 1938 Florida Gators football team =

American college football season

1938 Florida Gators football
- Conference: Southeastern Conference
- Record: 4–6–1 (2–2–1 SEC)
- Head coach: Josh Cody (3rd season)
- Captain: Frank Koscis
- Home stadium: Florida Field

Uniform
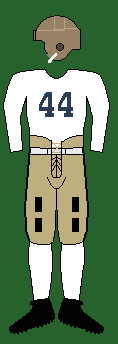

1938 Southeastern Conference football standings
| | Conf. | | | | | Overall |
| Team | | W | | L | | | W | | L |
|---|---|---|---|---|---|---|---|---|---|---|
| No. 2 Tennessee $ | 7 | – | 0 | – | 0 | 11 | – | 0 | – | 0 |
| No. 13 Alabama | 4 | – | 1 | – | 1 | 7 | – | 1 | – | 1 |
| No. 19 Tulane | 4 | – | 1 | – | 1 | 7 | – | 2 | – | 1 |
| Ole Miss | 3 | – | 2 | – | 0 | 9 | – | 2 | – | 0 |
| Georgia Tech | 2 | – | 1 | – | 3 | 3 | – | 4 | – | 3 |
| Vanderbilt | 4 | – | 3 | – | 0 | 6 | – | 3 | – | 0 |
| Florida | 2 | – | 2 | – | 1 | 4 | – | 6 | – | 1 |
| Auburn | 3 | – | 3 | – | 1 | 4 | – | 5 | – | 1 |
| Georgia | 1 | – | 2 | – | 1 | 5 | – | 4 | – | 1 |
| LSU | 2 | – | 4 | – | 0 | 6 | – | 4 | – | 0 |
| Mississippi State | 1 | – | 4 | – | 0 | 4 | – | 6 | – | 0 |
| Kentucky | 0 | – | 4 | – | 0 | 2 | – | 7 | – | 0 |
| Sewanee | 0 | – | 6 | – | 0 | 1 | – | 8 | – | 0 |
$ – Conference champion; Rankings from AP Poll

The 1938 Florida Gators football team represented the University of Florida during the 1938 college football season. The season was Josh Cody's third as the head coach of the Florida Gators football team. The highlights of the season included a 21–7 homecoming win over the Maryland Terrapins and a hard-fought 9–7 conference victory over the Auburn Tigers in Jacksonville, Florida, and the first-time meeting with the future in-state rival Miami Hurricanes. The season also included a 16–14 upset loss to Stetson in Gainesville. Cody's 1938 Florida Gators finished 4–6–1 overall and 2–2–1 in the Southeastern Conference (SEC), placing seventh of thirteen SEC teams in the conference standings—Cody's best finish in the SEC.

The season ended with a 20–12 loss to Temple, Pop Warner's last victory.

== Schedule ==
| Date | Time | Opponent | Site | Result | Attendance | Source |
|---|---|---|---|---|---|---|
| September 24 | 8:15 p.m. | Stetson* | Florida Field; Gainesville, FL | L 14–16 | 8,000 | |
| October 1 | | at Mississippi State | Scott Field; Starkville, MS | L 0–22 | | |
| October 8 | | Sewanee | Florida Field; Gainesville, FL | W 10–6 | 5,000 | |
| October 15 | | Miami (FL)* | Florida Field; Gainesville, FL (rivalry) | L 7–19 | 15,000 | |
| October 22 | | at Tampa* | Phillips Field; Tampa, FL | W 33–0 | 10,000 | |
| October 29 | | at Boston College* | Fenway Park; Boston, MA | L 0–33 | 10,000 | |
| November 5 | | vs. Georgia | Fairfield Stadium; Jacksonville, FL (rivalry) | L 6–19 | 17,000 | |
| November 12 | | Maryland*^{†} | Florida Field; Gainesville, FL | W 21–7 | 10,000 | |
| November 19 | | at Georgia Tech | Grant Field; Atlanta, GA | T 0–0 | 5,000 | |
| November 26 | | vs. Auburn | Fairfield Stadium; Jacksonville, FL (rivalry) | W 9–7 | 5,000 | |
| December 3 | | Temple* | Florida Field; Gainesville, FL | L 12–20 | | |
*Non-conference game; ^{†}Homecoming; All times are in Eastern time
