= Cary Cox =

American football player (1917–1991)

Profile
- Position: Center

Personal information
- Born: December 31, 1917; Bainbridge, Georgia, U.S.
- Died: December 27, 1991 (aged 73); Alexander City, Alabama, U.S.

Career information
- College: University of Alabama
- NFL draft: 1940: 11th round, 93rd overall pick

Career history
- 1937–1939: Alabama

Awards and highlights
- First-team All-American (1939); First-team All-SEC (1939); Second-team All-SEC (1938)

William Cary Cox (December 31, 1917 – December 27, 1991), sometimes listed as Cary Cox, was an American football player. Cox attended the University of Alabama where he played at the center position on the Alabama Crimson Tide football team. He was selected by Liberty magazine as a first-team player on the 1939 College Football All-America Team. During World War II, Cox commanded an infantry battalion in the European Theater. Cox later operated an automobile dealership in Alexander City, Alabama. He was inducted into the Alabama Sports Hall of Fame in 1988. He died in Alexander City in 1991.
