= 1938 Auburn Tigers football team =

American college football season

1938 Auburn Tigers football
- Conference: Southeastern Conference
- Record: 4–5–1 (3–3–1 SEC)
- Head coach: Jack Meagher (5th season)
- Home stadium: Legion Field; Cramton Bowl

1938 Southeastern Conference football standings
	Conf.					Overall
Team		W		L			W		L
No. 2 Tennessee $	7	–	0	–	0	11	–	0	–	0
No. 13 Alabama	4	–	1	–	1	7	–	1	–	1
No. 19 Tulane	4	–	1	–	1	7	–	2	–	1
Ole Miss	3	–	2	–	0	9	–	2	–	0
Georgia Tech	2	–	1	–	3	3	–	4	–	3
Vanderbilt	4	–	3	–	0	6	–	3	–	0
Florida	2	–	2	–	1	4	–	6	–	1
Auburn	3	–	3	–	1	4	–	5	–	1
Georgia	1	–	2	–	1	5	–	4	–	1
LSU	2	–	4	–	0	6	–	4	–	0
Mississippi State	1	–	4	–	0	4	–	6	–	0
Kentucky	0	–	4	–	0	2	–	7	–	0
Sewanee	0	–	6	–	0	1	–	8	–	0
$ – Conference champion; Rankings from AP Poll

The 1938 Auburn Tigers football team represented Auburn University in the 1938 college football season. The Tigers' were led by head coach Jack Meagher in his fifth season and finished the season with a record of four wins, five losses and one tie (4–5–1 overall, 3–3–1 in the SEC).

== Schedule ==
Date	Opponent	Site	Result	Attendance	Source
September 23	Birmingham–Southern*	Cramton Bowl; Montgomery, AL	W 14–0		
October 1	at Tulane	Tulane Stadium; New Orleans, LA (rivalry)	T 0–0	18,000	
October 8	at Tennessee	Shields–Watkins Field; Knoxville, TN (rivalry)	L 0–7	18,000	
October 14	Mississippi State	Cramton Bowl; Montgomery, AL	W 20–6		
October 22	at Georgia Tech	Grant Field; Atlanta, GA (rivalry)	L 6–7	20,000	
October 29	at Rice*	Rice Field; Houston, TX	L 0–14		
November 5	at Villanova*	Shibe Park; Philadelphia, PA	L 12–25	17,000	
November 12	LSU	Legion Field; Birmingham, AL (rivalry)	W 28–6	14,000	
November 19	vs. Georgia	Memorial Stadium; Columbus, GA (rivalry)	W 23–14	12,000	
November 26	vs. Florida	Fairfield Stadium; Jacksonville, FL (rivalry)	L 7–9	5,000	
*Non-conference game
