= 1938 Georgia Bulldogs football team =

American college football season

1938 Georgia Bulldogs football
- Conference: Southeastern Conference
- Record: 5–4–1 (1–2–1 SEC)
- Head coach: Joel Hunt (1st season)
- Home stadium: Sanford Stadium

1938 Southeastern Conference football standings
	Conf.					Overall
Team		W		L			W		L
No. 2 Tennessee $	7	–	0	–	0	11	–	0	–	0
No. 13 Alabama	4	–	1	–	1	7	–	1	–	1
No. 19 Tulane	4	–	1	–	1	7	–	2	–	1
Ole Miss	3	–	2	–	0	9	–	2	–	0
Georgia Tech	2	–	1	–	3	3	–	4	–	3
Vanderbilt	4	–	3	–	0	6	–	3	–	0
Florida	2	–	2	–	1	4	–	6	–	1
Auburn	3	–	3	–	1	4	–	5	–	1
Georgia	1	–	2	–	1	5	–	4	–	1
LSU	2	–	4	–	0	6	–	4	–	0
Mississippi State	1	–	4	–	0	4	–	6	–	0
Kentucky	0	–	4	–	0	2	–	7	–	0
Sewanee	0	–	6	–	0	1	–	8	–	0
$ – Conference champion; Rankings from AP Poll

The 1938 Georgia Bulldogs football team was an American football team that represented the University of Georgia as a member of the Southeastern Conference (SEC) during the 1938 college football season. In their first year under head coach Joel Hunt, the Bulldogs compiled an overall record of 5–4–1, with a conference record of 1–2–1, and finished 9th in the SEC.

== Schedule ==
Date	Time	Opponent	Site	Result	Attendance	Source
September 24		The Citadel*	Sanford Stadium; Athens, GA	W 20–12	7,000	
October 1		at South Carolina*	Columbia Municipal Stadium; Columbia, SC (rivalry)	W 7–6	13,000	
October 7		Furman*	Sanford Stadium; Athens, GA	W 38–7		
October 15		Mercer*	Sanford Stadium; Athens, GA	W 28–19		
October 22	2:00 p.m.	at No. 14 Holy Cross*	Fitton Field; Worcester, MA	L 6–29	24,000–25,000	
November 5		vs. Florida	Fairfield Stadium; Jacksonville, FL (rivalry)	W 19–6	17,000	
November 12		at Tulane	Tulane Stadium; New Orleans, LA	L 6–28		
November 19		vs. Auburn	Memorial Stadium; Columbus, GA (rivalry)	L 14–23	12,000	
November 26		Georgia Tech^{†}	Sanford Stadium; Athens, GA (rivalry)	T 0–0	28,000	
December 2		at Miami (FL)*	Burdine Stadium; Miami, FL	L 7–13	23,367	
*Non-conference game; ^{†}Homecoming; Rankings from AP Poll released prior to the game; All times are in Eastern time
