= 1938 Sewanee Tigers football team =

American college football season

1938 Sewanee Tigers football
- Conference: Southeastern Conference
- Record: 1–8 (0–6 SEC)
- Head coach: Harry E. Clark (8th season)
- Home stadium: Hardee Field

1938 Southeastern Conference football standings
	Conf.					Overall
Team		W		L			W		L
No. 2 Tennessee $	7	–	0	–	0	11	–	0	–	0
No. 13 Alabama	4	–	1	–	1	7	–	1	–	1
No. 19 Tulane	4	–	1	–	1	7	–	2	–	1
Ole Miss	3	–	2	–	0	9	–	2	–	0
Georgia Tech	2	–	1	–	3	3	–	4	–	3
Vanderbilt	4	–	3	–	0	6	–	3	–	0
Florida	2	–	2	–	1	4	–	6	–	1
Auburn	3	–	3	–	1	4	–	5	–	1
Georgia	1	–	2	–	1	5	–	4	–	1
LSU	2	–	4	–	0	6	–	4	–	0
Mississippi State	1	–	4	–	0	4	–	6	–	0
Kentucky	0	–	4	–	0	2	–	7	–	0
Sewanee	0	–	6	–	0	1	–	8	–	0
$ – Conference champion; Rankings from AP Poll

The 1938 Sewanee Tigers football team was an American football team that represented Sewanee: The University of the South as a member of the Southeastern Conference during the 1938 college football season. In their eighth season under head coach Harry E. Clark, Sewanee compiled a 1–8 record.

== Schedule ==
Date	Opponent	Site	Result	Attendance	Source
September 24	at Tennessee	Shields–Watkins Field; Knoxville, TN	L 3–26	15,000	
September 30	at Southwestern (TN)*	Crump Stadium; Memphis, TN (rivalry)	L 0–47		
October 8	at Florida	Florida Field; Gainesville, FL	L 6–10		
October 14	Hiwassee*	Hardee Field; Sewanee, TN	W 44–0		
October 22	at No. 15 Alabama	Denny Stadium; Tuscaloosa, AL	L 0–32	5,000	
October 29	Tennessee Tech*	Hardee Field; Sewanee, TN	L 6–7		
November 5	at Vanderbilt	Dudley Field; Nashville, TN (rivalry)	L 0–14		
November 12	at Ole Miss	Hemingway Stadium; Oxford, MS	L 0–39		
November 19	at Tulane	Tulane Stadium; New Orleans, LA	L 0–38		
*Non-conference game; Rankings from AP Poll released prior to the game
