= 1938 Mississippi State Maroons football team =

American college football season

1938 Mississippi State Maroons football
- Conference: Southeastern Conference
- Record: 4–6 (1–4 SEC)
- Head coach: Spike Nelson (1st season)
- Home stadium: Scott Field

1938 Southeastern Conference football standings
	Conf.					Overall
Team		W		L			W		L
No. 2 Tennessee $	7	–	0	–	0	11	–	0	–	0
No. 13 Alabama	4	–	1	–	1	7	–	1	–	1
No. 19 Tulane	4	–	1	–	1	7	–	2	–	1
Ole Miss	3	–	2	–	0	9	–	2	–	0
Georgia Tech	2	–	1	–	3	3	–	4	–	3
Vanderbilt	4	–	3	–	0	6	–	3	–	0
Florida	2	–	2	–	1	4	–	6	–	1
Auburn	3	–	3	–	1	4	–	5	–	1
Georgia	1	–	2	–	1	5	–	4	–	1
LSU	2	–	4	–	0	6	–	4	–	0
Mississippi State	1	–	4	–	0	4	–	6	–	0
Kentucky	0	–	4	–	0	2	–	7	–	0
Sewanee	0	–	6	–	0	1	–	8	–	0
$ – Conference champion; Rankings from AP Poll

The 1938 Mississippi State Maroons football team was an American football team that represented Mississippi State College (now known as Mississippi State University) as a member of the Southeastern Conference (SEC) during the 1938 college football season. In their first year under head coach Spike Nelson, the Maroons compiled an overall record of 4–6, with a conference record of 1–4, and finished 11th in the SEC.

Spike Nelson took over as head coach after the sudden resignation of Ralph Sasse. Nelson instituted new cardinal and gold uniforms, rather than the traditional maroon and white, upsetting fans and alumni. Nelson also proved unpopular with players and was not retained after the season.

== Schedule ==
Date	Opponent	Site	Result	Attendance	Source
September 24	Howard (AL)*	Scott Field; Starkville, MS	W 19–0		
October 1	Florida	Scott Field; Starkville, MS	W 22–0		
October 8	Louisiana Tech*	Scott Field; Starkville, MS	W 48–0	8,000	
October 14	at Auburn	Cliff Hare Stadium; Auburn, AL	L 6–20		
October 21	at Duquesne*	Forbes Field; Pittsburgh, PA	W 12–7	12,000	
October 29	at Tulane	Tulane Stadium; New Orleans, LA	L 0–27	20,000	
November 5	at LSU	Tiger Stadium; Baton Rouge, LA (rivalry)	L 7–32		
November 12	vs. Centenary*	Ray Stadium; Meridian, MS	L 0–19	5,000	
November 19	at Southwestern (TN)*	Crump Stadium; Memphis, TN	L 3–7	12,000	
November 26	Ole Miss	Scott Field; Starkville, MS (Egg Bowl)	L 6–19	15,000	
*Non-conference game
