= 1938 Kentucky Wildcats football team =

American college football season

1938 Kentucky Wildcats football
- Conference: Southeastern Conference
- Record: 2–7 (0–4 SEC)
- Head coach: Albert D. Kirwan (1st season)
- Captain: John S. Hinkebein
- Home stadium: McLean Stadium

1938 Southeastern Conference football standings
| | Conf. | | | | | Overall |
| Team | | W | | L | | | W | | L |
|---|---|---|---|---|---|---|---|---|---|---|
| No. 2 Tennessee $ | 7 | – | 0 | – | 0 | 11 | – | 0 | – | 0 |
| No. 13 Alabama | 4 | – | 1 | – | 1 | 7 | – | 1 | – | 1 |
| No. 19 Tulane | 4 | – | 1 | – | 1 | 7 | – | 2 | – | 1 |
| Ole Miss | 3 | – | 2 | – | 0 | 9 | – | 2 | – | 0 |
| Georgia Tech | 2 | – | 1 | – | 3 | 3 | – | 4 | – | 3 |
| Vanderbilt | 4 | – | 3 | – | 0 | 6 | – | 3 | – | 0 |
| Florida | 2 | – | 2 | – | 1 | 4 | – | 6 | – | 1 |
| Auburn | 3 | – | 3 | – | 1 | 4 | – | 5 | – | 1 |
| Georgia | 1 | – | 2 | – | 1 | 5 | – | 4 | – | 1 |
| LSU | 2 | – | 4 | – | 0 | 6 | – | 4 | – | 0 |
| Mississippi State | 1 | – | 4 | – | 0 | 4 | – | 6 | – | 0 |
| Kentucky | 0 | – | 4 | – | 0 | 2 | – | 7 | – | 0 |
| Sewanee | 0 | – | 6 | – | 0 | 1 | – | 8 | – | 0 |
$ – Conference champion; Rankings from AP Poll

The 1938 Kentucky Wildcats football team was an American football team that represented the University of Kentucky as a member of the Southeastern Conference (SEC) during the 1938 college football season. In their first season under head coach Albert D. Kirwan, the Wildcats compiled an overall record of 2–7 with a mark of 0–4 against conference opponents, finished in 12th place in the SEC, and were outscored by a total of 160 to 150. The team played its home games at McLean Stadium in Lexington, Kentucky.

== Schedule ==
| Date | Opponent | Site | Result | Attendance | Source |
|---|---|---|---|---|---|
| September 24 | Maryville (TN)* | McLean Stadium; Lexington, KY | W 46–7 | | |
| October 1 | Oglethorpe* | McLean Stadium; Lexington, KY | W 66–0 | 7,000 | |
| October 8 | Vanderbilt | McLean Stadium; Lexington, KY (rivalry) | L 7–14 | 13,500 | |
| October 15 | Washington and Lee* | McLean Stadium; Lexington, KY | L 0–8 | 10,000 | |
| October 22 | at Xavier* | Xavier Stadium; Cincinnati, OH | L 7–26 | 9,000 | |
| October 29 | No. 18 Alabama | McLean Stadium; Lexington, KY | L 6–26 | 15,000 | |
| November 5 | at Georgia Tech | Grant Field; Atlanta, GA | L 18–19 | 10,000 | |
| November 12 | Clemson* | McLean Stadium; Lexington, KY | L 0–14 | 6,000 | |
| November 24 | at No. 4 Tennessee | Shields–Watkins Field; Knoxville, TN (rivalry) | L 0–46 | | |
*Non-conference game; Rankings from AP Poll released prior to the game
