= 1938 LSU Tigers football team =

American college football season

1938 LSU Tigers football
- Conference: Southeastern Conference
- Record: 6–4 (2–4 SEC)
- Head coach: Bernie Moore (4th season)
- Home stadium: Tiger Stadium

1938 Southeastern Conference football standings
	Conf.					Overall
Team		W		L			W		L
No. 2 Tennessee $	7	–	0	–	0	11	–	0	–	0
No. 13 Alabama	4	–	1	–	1	7	–	1	–	1
No. 19 Tulane	4	–	1	–	1	7	–	2	–	1
Ole Miss	3	–	2	–	0	9	–	2	–	0
Georgia Tech	2	–	1	–	3	3	–	4	–	3
Vanderbilt	4	–	3	–	0	6	–	3	–	0
Florida	2	–	2	–	1	4	–	6	–	1
Auburn	3	–	3	–	1	4	–	5	–	1
Georgia	1	–	2	–	1	5	–	4	–	1
LSU	2	–	4	–	0	6	–	4	–	0
Mississippi State	1	–	4	–	0	4	–	6	–	0
Kentucky	0	–	4	–	0	2	–	7	–	0
Sewanee	0	–	6	–	0	1	–	8	–	0
$ – Conference champion; Rankings from AP Poll

The 1938 LSU Tigers football team was an American football team that represented Louisiana State University (LSU) as a member of the Southeastern Conference (SEC) during the 1938 college football season. In their fourth year under head coach Bernie Moore, the Tigers compiled an overall record of 6–4, with a conference record of 2–4, and finished 10th in the SEC.

== Schedule ==
Date	Opponent	Site	Result	Attendance	Source
September 24	Ole Miss	Tiger Stadium; Baton Rouge, LA (rivalry)	L 7–20	25,000	
October 2	at Texas*	War Memorial Stadium; Austin, TX	W 20–0	17,000	
October 8	Rice*	Tiger Stadium; Baton Rouge, LA	W 3–0	40,000	
October 15	Loyola (LA)*	Tiger Stadium; Baton Rouge, LA	W 47–6	10,000	
October 22	No. 16 Vanderbilt^{†}	Tiger Stadium; Baton Rouge, LA	W 7–0	35,000	
October 29	at No. 8 Tennessee	Shields–Watkins Field; Knoxville, TN	L 6–14	36,000	
November 5	Mississippi State	Tiger Stadium; Baton Rouge, LA (rivalry)	W 32–7		
November 12	at Auburn	Legion Field; Birmingham, AL (rivlary)	L 6–28	14,000	
November 19	Southwestern Louisiana*	Tiger Stadium; Baton Rouge, LA	W 32–0		
November 26	Tulane	Tiger Stadium; Baton Rouge, LA (Battle for the Rag)	L 0–14	40,000	
*Non-conference game; ^{†}Homecoming; Rankings from AP Poll released prior to the game
