= 1938 Georgia Tech Yellow Jackets football team =

American college football season

1938 Georgia Tech Yellow Jackets football
- Conference: Southeastern Conference
- Record: 3–4–3 (2–1–3 SEC)
- Head coach: William Alexander (19th season)
- Offensive scheme: Single-wing
- Captain: Jack Chivington
- Home stadium: Grant Field

1938 Southeastern Conference football standings
	Conf.					Overall
Team		W		L			W		L
No. 2 Tennessee $	7	–	0	–	0	11	–	0	–	0
No. 13 Alabama	4	–	1	–	1	7	–	1	–	1
No. 19 Tulane	4	–	1	–	1	7	–	2	–	1
Ole Miss	3	–	2	–	0	9	–	2	–	0
Georgia Tech	2	–	1	–	3	3	–	4	–	3
Vanderbilt	4	–	3	–	0	6	–	3	–	0
Florida	2	–	2	–	1	4	–	6	–	1
Auburn	3	–	3	–	1	4	–	5	–	1
Georgia	1	–	2	–	1	5	–	4	–	1
LSU	2	–	4	–	0	6	–	4	–	0
Mississippi State	1	–	4	–	0	4	–	6	–	0
Kentucky	0	–	4	–	0	2	–	7	–	0
Sewanee	0	–	6	–	0	1	–	8	–	0
$ – Conference champion; Rankings from AP Poll

The 1938 Georgia Tech Yellow Jackets football team was an American football team that represented Georgia Tech as a member of the Southeastern Conference (SEC) during the 1938 college football season. In their 19th year under head coach William Alexander, the Yellow Jackets compiled an overall record of 3–4–3, with a conference record of 2–1–3, and finished fifth in the SEC.

== Schedule ==
Date	Opponent	Site	Result	Attendance	Source
October 1	Mercer*	Grant Field; Atlanta, GA	W 19–0	8,000	
October 8	Notre Dame*	Grant Field; Atlanta, GA (rivalry)	L 6–14	26,533	
October 15	at Duke*	Duke Stadium; Durham, NC	L 0–6	28,000	
October 22	Auburn	Grant Field; Atlanta, GA (rivalry)	W 7–6	20,000	
October 29	at Vanderbilt	Dudley Field; Nashville, TN (rivalry)	L 7–13	17,000	
November 5	Kentucky	Grant Field; Atlanta, GA	W 19–18	10,000	
November 12	No. 16 Alabama	Grant Field; Atlanta, GA (rivalry)	T 14–14	35,000	
November 19	Florida	Grant Field; Atlanta, GA	T 0–0	5,000	
November 26	at Georgia	Sanford Stadium; Athens, GA (rivalry)	T 0–0	28,000	
December 26	at No. 12 California*	California Memorial Stadium; Berkeley, CA	L 0–13	40,000	
*Non-conference game; Rankings from AP Poll released prior to the game
