= Bo Russell =

American football player (1916–1997)

No. 45
- Position: Offensive lineman

Personal information
- Born: January 23, 1916; Birmingham, Alabama, U.S.
- Died: February 1, 1997 (aged 81); Birmingham, Alabama, U.S.
- Listed height: 6 ft 1 in (1.85 m)
- Listed weight: 223 lb (101 kg)

Career information
- High school: Woodlawn (Birmingham)
- College: Auburn (1935-1938)
- NFL draft: 1939: 8th round, 68th overall pick

Career history
- Washington Redskins (1939–1940)

Awards and highlights
- Second-team All-American (1938); 2× First-team All-SEC (1937, 1938)

Career NFL statistics
- Games played: 22
- Games started: 3
- Touchdowns: 1
- Stats at Pro Football Reference

Torrance Albert Russell Jr. (January 23, 1916 – February 1, 1997) was an American professional football offensive lineman in the National Football League (NFL) for the Washington Redskins. He played college football at Auburn University and was selected in the eighth round of the 1939 NFL draft. His interment was located in Birmingham's Elmwood Cemetery.
