= Charley Boswell =

American football player

Charles A. Boswell (December 22, 1916 – October 22, 1995) was an Alabama football player and a blind golf player who fought in World War II. He was born in Birmingham, Alabama. He graduated from Ensley High School in 1936, earning a football scholarship to attend the University of Alabama. He won a minor league baseball spot with the Atlanta Crackers in 1941, but was drafted into the United States Army. He was promoted to captain of the Third Battalion, 335th Infantry Regiment, 84th Infantry Division. During action, Boswell was attempting to rescue a wounded comrade from a burning Sherman tank when the tank exploded, leaving him permanently blinded. He took up golf during his rehabilitation and eventually placed second at the National Blind Golf Championship in 1946. He won the championship at the Northland Country Club in Duluth, Minnesota the following year. He subsequently won 16 national championships and 11 international championships over the span of his career. During his career, Boswell shot three holes in one. He was inducted into the Alabama Hall of Fame in 1972.
