= 1938 Tennessee Volunteers football team =

American college football season

1938 Tennessee Volunteers football

National champion (various selectors) SEC champion Orange Bowl champion

Orange Bowl, W 17–0 vs. Oklahoma
- Conference: Southeastern Conference

Ranking
- AP: No. 2
- Record: 11–0 (7–0 SEC)
- Head coach: Robert Neyland (12th season)
- Offensive scheme: Single-wing
- Captain: Bowden Wyatt
- Home stadium: Shields–Watkins Field

1938 Southeastern Conference football standings
	Conf.					Overall
Team		W		L			W		L
No. 2 Tennessee $	7	–	0	–	0	11	–	0	–	0
No. 13 Alabama	4	–	1	–	1	7	–	1	–	1
No. 19 Tulane	4	–	1	–	1	7	–	2	–	1
Ole Miss	3	–	2	–	0	9	–	2	–	0
Georgia Tech	2	–	1	–	3	3	–	4	–	3
Vanderbilt	4	–	3	–	0	6	–	3	–	0
Florida	2	–	2	–	1	4	–	6	–	1
Auburn	3	–	3	–	1	4	–	5	–	1
Georgia	1	–	2	–	1	5	–	4	–	1
LSU	2	–	4	–	0	6	–	4	–	0
Mississippi State	1	–	4	–	0	4	–	6	–	0
Kentucky	0	–	4	–	0	2	–	7	–	0
Sewanee	0	–	6	–	0	1	–	8	–	0
$ – Conference champion; Rankings from AP Poll

The 1938 Tennessee Volunteers football team represented the University of Tennessee in the 1938 college football season. Head coach Robert Neyland fielded his third team at Tennessee after returning from active duty in the United States Army. The 1938 Tennessee Volunteers won the school's first national championship and are regarded as one of the greatest teams in SEC and NCAA history. The team was named national champion by various NCAA-designated major selectors, then and in the decades since, including these math systems: Berryman, Billingsley, Boand, Dunkel, Houlgate, Litkenhous, Poling, Sagarin, and Williamson.

In 1938, The Vols went 10–0 in the regular season and then shut out fellow unbeaten Oklahoma in the Orange Bowl, 17–0, snapping the Sooners' 14-game win streak and beginning a long winning streak for Neyland. Tennessee finished No. 2 in the final AP Poll. Heisman Trophy winner Davey O'Brien and his undefeated TCU Horned Frogs finished No. 1 in the final AP Poll, winning the AP national championship.

The 1938 Volunteers were the first of three consecutive Tennessee squads that had undefeated regular seasons. Tennessee won three consecutive conference titles before Neyland left for military service in World War II in 1941. Tennessee also began a historic streak in 1938. By shutting out their last four regular season opponents, the Vols began a streak of 17 consecutive regular season shutouts and 71 consecutive shutout quarters, still NCAA records. Athlon Sports has named the 1938 UT team as the third best college football team of all time.

== Prominent players ==
The Vols featured three All American performers. Bob Suffridge was an All American at guard, while Bowden Wyatt earned his spot on the team as an end. George Cafego carried the ball as a tailback. Co-Captain: Joe Little "...The Vols defeated the Sooners 17-0 in a game termed the roughest ever played. George Cafego knocked Oklahoma star Waddy Young for a loop with a devastating block on the game's first play. Played with great intensity, the game featured the teams being penalized 220 yards between them." It got so bad that Neyland asked team Co-captain Sparta's Joe Little, also a Tennessee boxing letterman, to settle things down. Little lasted one play before decking a Sooner who approached him with a foot to chest in play. He was ejected and was apologizing to Neyland before he reached the Tennessee sideline. Ironically, it had the intended effect of settling the game down for Neyland. In between all the penalties, Bob Foxx and Babe Wood scored touchdowns and team co-captain Bowden Wyatt, later Vol head coach, kicked a field goal and ran in an extra point. Tennessee held the Sooners to 94 yards total offense, while cranking up 260 of its own. It was Tennessee's speed against Oklahoma's size, and, on this day, Tennessee's speed won out."

== Schedule ==
Date	Opponent	Rank	Site	Result	Attendance	Source
September 24	Sewanee		Shields–Watkins Field; Knoxville, TN	W 26–3	15,000	
October 1	Clemson*		Shields–Watkins Field; Knoxville, TN	W 20–7	16,000	
October 8	Auburn		Shields–Watkins Field; Knoxville, TN (rivalry)	W 7–0	18,000	
October 15	at Alabama		Legion Field; Birmingham, AL (rivalry)	W 13–0	25,000	
October 22	The Citadel*	No. 8	Shields–Watkins Field; Knoxville, TN	W 44–0	8,000	
October 29	LSU^{†}	No. 8	Shields–Watkins Field; Knoxville, TN	W 14–6	36,000	
November 5	Chattanooga*	No. 6	Shields–Watkins Field; Knoxville, TN	W 45–0	7,500	
November 12	at Vanderbilt	No. 4	Dudley Field; Nashville, TN (rivalry)	W 14–0	23,000	
November 24	Kentucky	No. 4	Shields–Watkins Field; Knoxville, TN (rivalry)	W 46–0		
December 3	vs. Ole Miss	No. 4	Crump Stadium; Memphis, TN (rivalry)	W 47–0	21,000	
January 2, 1939	vs. No. 4 Oklahoma*	No. 2	Burdine Stadium; Miami, FL (Orange Bowl)	W 17–0	32,191	
*Non-conference game; ^{†}Homecoming; Rankings from AP Poll released prior to the game
