= 1938 Tulane Green Wave football team =

American college football season

1938 Tulane Green Wave football
- Conference: Southeastern Conference

Ranking
- AP: No. 19
- Record: 7–2–1 (4–1–1 SEC)
- Head coach: Red Dawson (3rd season)
- Captain: Raymond Miller
- Home stadium: Tulane Stadium

1938 Southeastern Conference football standings
	Conf.					Overall
Team		W		L			W		L
No. 2 Tennessee $	7	–	0	–	0	11	–	0	–	0
No. 13 Alabama	4	–	1	–	1	7	–	1	–	1
No. 19 Tulane	4	–	1	–	1	7	–	2	–	1
Ole Miss	3	–	2	–	0	9	–	2	–	0
Georgia Tech	2	–	1	–	3	3	–	4	–	3
Vanderbilt	4	–	3	–	0	6	–	3	–	0
Florida	2	–	2	–	1	4	–	6	–	1
Auburn	3	–	3	–	1	4	–	5	–	1
Georgia	1	–	2	–	1	5	–	4	–	1
LSU	2	–	4	–	0	6	–	4	–	0
Mississippi State	1	–	4	–	0	4	–	6	–	0
Kentucky	0	–	4	–	0	2	–	7	–	0
Sewanee	0	–	6	–	0	1	–	8	–	0
$ – Conference champion; Rankings from AP Poll

The 1938 Tulane Green Wave football team was an American football team that represented Tulane University as a member of the Southeastern Conference (SEC) during the 1938 college football season. In its third year under head coach Red Dawson, Tulane compiled a 7–2–1 record (4–1–1 in conference games), finished second in the SEC, and outscored opponents by a total of 211 to 53.

The Green Wave played its home games at Tulane Stadium in New Orleans.

== Schedule ==
Date	Opponent	Site	Result	Attendance	Source
September 24	Clemson*	Tulane Stadium; New Orleans, LA	L 10–13	12,000	
October 1	Auburn	Tulane Stadium; New Orleans, LA (rivalry)	T 0–0	18,000	
October 8	at North Carolina*	Kenan Memorial Stadium; Chapel Hill, NC	W 17–14	22,000	
October 15	Rice*	Tulane Stadium; New Orleans, LA	W 26–17	24,000	
October 22	Mercer*	Tulane Stadium; New Orleans, LA	W 51–0	15,000	
October 29	Mississippi State	Tulane Stadium; New Orleans, LA	W 27–0	20,000	
November 5	at No. 15 Alabama	Legion Field; Birmingham, AL	L 0–3	19,000	
November 12	Georgia	Tulane Stadium; New Orleans, LA	W 28–6		
November 19	Sewanee	Tulane Stadium; New Orleans, LA	W 38–0		
November 26	at LSU	Tiger Stadium; Baton Rouge, LA (Battle for the Rag)	W 14–0	40,000	
*Non-conference game; Rankings from AP Poll released prior to the game
