= Marvin Franklin =

American football player and coach

Biographical details
- Born: September 12, 1916; Athens, Georgia, U.S.
- Died: November 12, 1988 (aged 72); Trenton, New Jersey, U.S.
- Education: Vanderbilt University; Yale Divinity School

Playing career
- 1935–1938: Vanderbilt
- 1939: Providence Steam Roller
- Position: End

Coaching career (HC unless noted)
- 1946: Temple (ends)
- 1947: Yale (ends)
- 1948: Yale (freshmen)
- 1949–1951: Nebraska (assistant)
- 1953–1954: Kearney State Teachers
- 1955–1956: Houston (ends)
- 1957–1960: SMU (ends)
- 1961–1967: Kent School (CT)
- 1968–?: Battle Ground Academy (TN)

Head coaching record
- Overall: 8–8–2 (college)

Accomplishments and honors

Awards
- First-team All-SEC (1938)

Marvin Augustus "Preacher" Franklin Jr. (September 12, 1916 – November 12, 1988) was an American football player and coach. He served as the head football coach at Nebraska State Teachers College at Kearney—now known as the University of Nebraska–Kearney–from 1953 to 1954, compiling a record of 8–8–2.

== Early life and career ==
Born in Athens, Georgia on September 12, 1916, Franklin was the eldest of four children born to Ruth (née Tuck) and Marvin Augustus Franklin Sr. He attended Vanderbilt University, graduating in 1939 with a Bachelor of Arts degree and received his Bachelor of Divinity from Yale Divinity School in 1940.

Franklin played college football as an end at Vanderbilt University from 1935 to 1938. After leaving Kearney, he worked as an assistant coach at the University of Houston under head coach Bill Meek. Franklin moved with Meek to Southern Methodist University (SMU) in 1957 and coaches the ends there for four seasons. He resigned in 1961 to become head football coach at the Kent School in Kent, Connecticut. After seven years at Kent, Franklin was hired as head football coach at Battle Ground Academy in Franklin, Tennessee.

== Personal life and death ==
On September 16, 1943, at Crawford Street Methodist Church, Vicksburg, Mississippi, with his father, Dr. Marvin Augustus Franklin of Birmingham reading the vows, Franklin was married to Mary Ellen Cunningham, with whom he had three children.

Franklin died on November 12, 1988, aged 72, at his home in Trenton, New Jersey, survived by his wife and children.

== Head coaching record ==
=== College ===
Year	Team	Overall	Conference	Standing	Bowl/playoffs
Kearney State Antelopes (Nebraska College Conference) (1953–1954)
1953	Kearney State	3–5–1	3–2–1	3rd	
1954	Kearney State	5–3–1	4–2–1	3rd	
Kearney State:		8–8–2	7–4–2		
Total:		8–8–2			
