= Charlie Holm =

American football player

Profile
- Position: Fullback

Personal information
- Born: Fairfield, Alabama, U.S.

Career information
- High school: Ensley (Birmingham, Alabama)
- College: Alabama (1937–1938)

Awards and highlights
- First-team All-SEC (1938); Second-team All-SEC (1937)

Charles H. Holm was a college football player, a prominent fullback for the Alabama Crimson Tide. He was drafted in the third round of the 1939 NFL draft by the Washington Redskins, but shortly thereafter retired. He was the brother of Tony Holm.
