= Ensley High School =

High school in Alabama, United States

Coordinates: 33°30′18″N 86°53′35″W

Information
- Established: 1901
- Closed: 2006 (merged into P.D. Jackson-Olin High School
- Principal: Ethel Knight
- Colors: Black and gold
- Team name: Yellow Jackets

Ensley High School is a former high school which was located in the Ensley neighborhood of Birmingham, Alabama (United States). It was founded in 1901 to serve the then-independent community of Ensley, which was centered on major plants operated by U.S. Steel and the American Cast Iron Pipe Company. It began with classes held at the Old Bush School before the old building, designed by architect David O. Whilldin was constructed in 1908. In 2006, Ensley High School was merged into newly built Jackson-Olin High School.

== History ==
Ensley High School was absorbed into the Birmingham City Schools when Ensley was annexed into the city in 1910. During its first decade, Ensley principal Roy Dimmitt compiled detailed statistical data on Ensley's male students in order to determine how much cigarette smoking affected their "efficacy". He found that the students who smoked were consistently outscored by their non-smoking counterparts. By his calculation almost two thirds of those who failed a year or withdrew from school were smokers. His findings were published in Henry Ford's 1914 anti-smoking volume "The Case Against the Little White Slaver."

In 1936 more than a hundred students at Ensley High School contracted food poisoning which was traced to profiteroles (cream puffs) purchased from a local bakery. The Jefferson County Department of Health, which had been unable to maintain their inspections program during the Depression, found conditions at the bakery to be "filthy". (Ford – 1914)

Previously an all-white school, Ensley High School was formally integrated, without major incident, in September 1964. Nevertheless, persistent racial segregation in the Birmingham area, especially after the loss of Ensley's major industries, made it so that the student body had become overwhelmingly African American by the mid-1970s. In recent decades the high school was repositioned as a "magnet school" within the Birmingham system.

Ensley Magnet High School was closed following the 2005–2006 academic year. In May 2006, the school's last graduating class, 134 strong, received their diplomas. In the fall of 2006, Ensley High School was merged into newly built Jackson-Olin High School.

The last principal at Ensley High School was Ethel Knight. The school's colors were black and gold and their teams were known as the "Yellow Jackets".

In the early morning hours of Tuesday, July 17, 2018, a fire destroyed the old Ensley High School building.

== Athletics ==
The Ensley Yellow Jackets most common football rival was Woodlawn High School whom they played 84 times with a record of 35-46-3. Before the existence of a state playoff system Ensley won the "mythical" State Football Championship in 1924, 1938, 1945, and 1961. The 1931 Boys Track and Field Team also won a state championship. In 1999 girls basketball coach Roderick Jackson tried and failed to get the school and board of education to give his team access to the same equipment, transport, and funding enjoyed by the boys' teams. He was fired from his coaching job and sued under Title IX, 1972 federal legislation that requires non-discrimination in publicly funded education programs. Lower courts upheld the firing but the Supreme Court of the United States faulted their decisions and called for new hearings on the merits of the case.

== Notable graduates ==
- Cornelius Bennett (1983), Pro Bowl linebacker in the NFL
- Charley Boswell, blind golfer
- Corey Chamblin, football player
- Frank Moore Cross (1938), Biblical scholar
- Phil English, High School Baseball Coach (566-217) at Ensley, Banks, Huffman, Hewitt-Trussville with state 4A titles at Huffman (1977,1982); AL H.S. Sports Hall of Fame (1994)
- Hank Erwin (1967), Alabama State Senate
- Charlie Finley, owner of Oakland Athletics
- Abraham Jones, (1985) Vice-President, Merrill Lynch
- Dave Middleton, football player
- Mike O'Berry, former MLB player (Boston Red Sox, Chicago Cubs, Cincinnati Reds, California Angels, New York Yankees, Montreal Expos)
- Tony Petelos (1971), Mayor of Hoover, Alabama
- Erskine "Erk" Russell, former head coach, Georgia Southern University
- Rebel Steiner, football player
- Jabo Waggoner (1955), Alabama State Senator
- Joe Webb, NFL quarterback

== See also ==
- Jackson v. Birmingham Board of Education
