= Parker Hall (American football) =

American football player (1916–2005)

No. 32, 64
- Positions: Quarterback, halfback, punter

Personal information
- Born: December 10, 1916; Tunica, Mississippi, U.S.
- Died: February 8, 2005 (aged 88); Vicksburg, Mississippi, U.S.
- Listed height: 6 ft 0 in (1.83 m)
- Listed weight: 198 lb (90 kg)

Career information
- High school: Tunica
- College: Ole Miss (1936–1938)
- NFL draft: 1939: 1st round, 3rd overall pick

Career history
- Cleveland Rams (1939–1942); San Francisco 49ers (1946)

Awards and highlights
- NFL Most Valuable Player (1939); First-team All-Pro (1939); Pro Bowl (1939); NFL completion percentage leader (1939); 2× NFL punting yards leader (1939, 1940); Consensus All-American (1938); First-team All-SEC (1938)

Career NFL/AAFC statistics
- TD–INT: 30–67
- Passing yards: 4,028
- Completion percentage: 45.4%
- Passer rating: 38.4
- Rushing yards: 1,083
- Rushing touchdowns: 6
- Punts: 200
- Punting yards: 8,222
- Stats at Pro Football Reference
- College Football Hall of Fame

Linus Parker "Bullet" Hall (December 10, 1916 – February 8, 2005) was an American football quarterback, tailback and punter who played for the Cleveland Rams and the San Francisco 49ers. He was drafted in the first round with the third overall pick in the 1939 NFL draft.

== Biography ==
Hall on the cover of a Rams program from the 1940 season.

In his rookie season, Hall led the league in passing, was second in passing yardage, and fifth in rushing yards. He was named the league's most valuable player in 1939 and was the first professional player to complete over 100 passes in a single season.

On October 20, 1940, in a game against the Chicago Cardinals, Hall set an NFL record with 46 yards per completion. Hall completed 3/17 passes for 138 yards, two touchdowns, and two interceptions.

He spent four seasons with the Rams, and after returning from military service during World War II, Hall played with the 49ers of the All-America Football Conference (AAFC) during their inaugural season.

He moved to Memphis, Tennessee, after retiring from football and worked in the lumber business.

== NFL/AAFC career statistics ==
Legend
	Led the league
**Bold**	Career high

Year	Team	Games		Passing									Rushing				
Year	Team	GP	GS	Cmp	Att	Pct	Yds	Y/A	Lng	TD	Int	Rtg	Att	Yds	Avg	Lng	TD
1939	RAM	11	11	**106**	**208**	**51.0**	**1,227**	5.9	-	**9**	13	**57.5**	**120**	**458**	3.8	-	**2**
1940	RAM	11	7	77	183	42.1	1,108	**6.1**	-	7	16	38.7	94	365	3.9	-	1
1941	RAM	10	8	84	190	44.2	863	4.5	39	7	**19**	30.5	57	232	**4.1**	**60**	**2**
1942	RAM	10	8	62	140	44.3	815	5.8	**59**	7	**19**	40.3	41	-3	-0.1	13	1
1946	SFO	11	0	2	8	25.0	15	1.9	-	0	0	39.6	17	31	1.8	-	0
Career		53	34	331	729	45.4	4,028	5.5	59	30	67	38.4	329	1,083	3.3	60	6

== See also ==
- List of NCAA major college football yearly scoring leaders (1938)
- List of National Football League annual punting yards leaders
