= Charles Allen Cary =

American veterinarian and educator

Charles Allen Cary (1861–1935) was an American veterinarian and educator.

== Biography ==
He was born and educated in Iowa. He received the Doctor of Veterinary Medicine degree from Iowa State University in 1887. He did graduate work at the University of Missouri and in Germany. In 1892, Cary taught the first veterinary science course at the Alabama Agricultural and Mechanical College, now Auburn University.

In 1893, he was appointed professor of physiology and veterinary science, as well as experiment station veterinarian. In both capacities, he was remembered as a dynamic teacher. He became Alabama's first State Veterinarian in 1905, during which time he led in establishing meat and dairy inspection laws.

In 1907, he was named Dean of the new College of Veterinary Medicine at Auburn, the first such school in the South. He held that position until his death in 1935. Cary was President of the Alabama Veterinary Association, the Alabama Livestock Association, and the United States Livestock Sanitary Association. His campaigns to eradicate bovine tuberculosis and Texas tick fever were among the many accomplishments that led to his recognition as the Father of Veterinary Medicine in the South. In 1957, he was elected to the Alabama Hall of Fame.

At the first Charles Allen Cary Lecture given at Auburn University's College of Veterinary Medicine, January 27, 1992, Charles W. Schwabe from the University of California at Davis, said: "I can think of no other veterinarian who more profoundly influenced through his professional lifetime, the health and well being of a whole region of this country than Charles Allen Cary."

Charles Allen Cary was inducted into the Alabama Men's Hall of Fame in 1992. He was married to Emma Heck Cary, with whom he had three children. Emma Cary founded the Auburn Women's Club and the Auburn Equal Suffrage Association.

Cary is best known for his fight to rid Alabama livestock of fever ticks. Brucellosis and tuberculosis testing were furthered by his research and practical applications. When farmers sought hog cholera serum at low prices, Cary used his influence to establish a plant at Auburn to make it. His Saturday clinics and summer institutes taught farmers about the prevention and treatment of diseases of animals. In 1896 he helped to establish at Montgomery the first meat inspection system in the United States, following that up with meat and milk inspection ordinances in all major Alabama cities. Through his efforts the first school of veterinary science in the South was established at Auburn and he served as dean of that school for 28 years. The veterinary science building on the campus now bears his name.
