= Joel Hunt =

American baseball player and football coach (1905–1978)

Biographical details
- Born: October 11, 1905; Texico, New Mexico Territory
- Died: July 24, 1978 (aged 72); Teague, Texas, U.S.

Playing career

Football
- 1925–1927: Texas A&M

Baseball
- 1929–1930: Houston Buffaloes
- 1931–1932: Columbus Senators/Red Birds
- 1931: Rochester Red Wings
- 1931–1932: St. Louis Cardinals
- Positions: Running back, punter, kicker (football); Right fielder (baseball)

Coaching career (HC unless noted)

Football
- 1928–1929: Marshall (TX)
- 1930–1932: Texas A&M (assistant)
- 1933–1936: LSU (assistant)
- 1938: Georgia
- 1939: Wyoming
- 1940–1941: LSU (assistant)
- 1945–1947: LSU (assistant)
- 1949: Buffalo Bills (assistant)
- 1950: Baltimore Colts (assistant)
- 1955: Houston (assistant)

Head coaching record
- Overall: 5–11–2 (college)

Accomplishments and honors

Awards
- Second-team All-American (1927); 2× First-team All-SWC (1925, 1927)
- College Football Hall of Fame; Inducted in 1967 (profile)

Oliver Joel "Lil' Joel" Hunt (October 11, 1905 – July 24, 1978) was an American football and baseball player and coach of football. He played college football at Texas A&M University from 1925 to 1927 and served as the head football coach at the University of Georgia in 1938 and the University of Wyoming in 1939. Hunt also played professional baseball in the minor leagues and briefly with the St. Louis Cardinals of Major League Baseball. He was inducted into the College Football Hall of Fame as a player in 1967.

== College football playing career ==
Hunt played for Texas A&M from 1925 to 1927. While in college, Hunt was a running back, punter, place kicker and defensive player. Playing in 27 games during his career, he scored 30 touchdowns, 5 field goals and 29 extra points. His 19 rushing touchdowns in 1927 was a school record that stood for 85 years until it was broken by Heisman Trophy winner Johnny Manziel in 2012. The trophy's namesake, Coach John Heisman, who was the head coach at Rice University during Hunt's years at Texas A&M and saw Hunt play, asserted that Hunt was "the greatest all-around player I ever saw."

== Coaching and professional baseball career ==
In 1928, Hunt was hired as the head football coach at the College of Marshall—now known as East Texas Baptist University. He also played professional baseball, spending most of his time in the minor leagues, and playing 16 games in Major League Baseball (MLB) with the St. Louis Cardinals in 1931 and 1932. Hunt posted a .182 batting average (4-for-22) with 2 runs, 1 double, 3 RBI and 4 bases on balls. He accepted 13 total chances at right field without an error for a 1.000 fielding percentage. Hunt was assistant coach at Texas A&M University (1930–1932) and at Louisiana State University (1933–1936). He became the head football coach at Georgia in 1938 and completed his only season there with a 5–4–1 record.

At Georgia, Hunt was a surprise replacement for the popular head coach Harry Mehre. Although Hunt's 5–4–1 record as a head coach was respectable, his most important contribution to Georgia Bulldogs football was a coaching assistant that he brought with him, Wally Butts. Butts became Georgia's head coach in 1939 and continued in that position until 1960.

After Georgia, Hunt became the head football coach at the University of Wyoming in 1939, where he had a disappointing 0–7–1 record. Following his brief stint as head coach at Georgia and Wyoming, Hunt returned to being assistant coach: again with LSU (1940–1941, 1945–1947). At LSU in the 1940s, Hunt coached the kicking and punting. He was not impressed with the length of punts, as a long return might nullify the advantage. Regarding a particularly gifted player for Ole Miss, Hunt told Alvin Dark that "A thirty-five-yard kick out of bounds is better than a sixty-yarder that he gets his hands on." Dark recalled that at every practice, Hunt would station him at the 40-yard line and have him aim for a flag out of bounds just before the goal line. If the ball were kicked to that spot during a game, the team it was kicked to would start their offensive drive at that location.

Hunt later coached with the Buffalo Bills of the All-America Football Conference (AAFC) in 1949, the Baltimore Colts of the National Football League (NFL) in 1950, and at the University of Houston in 1955.

== Honors and later life ==
Hunt was inducted into the College Football Hall of Fame as a player in 1967. He died in Teague, Texas on July 24, 1978.

== Head coaching record ==
=== College ===
Year	Team	Overall	Conference	Standing	Bowl/playoffs
Georgia Bulldogs (Southeastern Conference) (1938)
1938	Georgia	5–4–1	1–2–1	9th	
Georgia:		5–4–1	1–2–1		
Wyoming Cowboys (Mountain States Conference) (1939)
1939	Wyoming	0–7–1	0–5–1	7th	
Wyoming:		0–7–1	0–5–1		
Total:		5–11–2			
