= Bob Suffridge =

American football player (1916–1974)

No. 60, 65
- Position: Guard

Personal information
- Born: March 17, 1916; Union County, Tennessee, U.S.
- Died: March 3, 1974 (aged 57); Knoxville, Tennessee, U.S.
- Listed height: 6 ft 0 in (1.83 m)
- Listed weight: 205 lb (93 kg)

Career information
- High school: Central (Knoxville)
- College: Tennessee (1937-1940)
- NFL draft: 1941: 6th round, 42nd overall pick

Career history

Playing
- Philadelphia Eagles (1941, 1945)

Coaching
- NC State (1956–1961) Line coach

Awards and highlights
- Unanimous All-American (1940); 2× First-team All-American (1938, 1939); 3× First-team All-SEC (1938, 1939, 1940)

Career NFL statistics
- Games played: 20
- Games started: 10
- Military career
- Allegiance: United States
- Branch: U.S. Navy
- Service years: 1942–1944
- Rank: Lieutenant commander
- Conflicts: World War II
- Stats at Pro Football Reference
- College Football Hall of Fame

Robert Lee Suffridge (March 17, 1916 – March 3, 1974) was an American professional football player in the National Football League (NFL) for the Philadelphia Eagles. He played college football at the University of Tennessee, where he was later inducted into the school's hall of fame and the College Football Hall of Fame. Suffridge also served in the United States Navy during World War II.

== Early life ==
Suffridge attended Central High School in Knoxville, Tennessee.

== College career ==
Suffridge played college football at the University of Tennessee, where he played under coach Robert Neyland from 1938 to 1940. He was a three time All American, receiving the honor each year of his playing career. He also won the Knute Rockne Memorial Trophy.

Suffridge was noted for his quickness. As one bio states "Suffridge was so quick he once blocked the same point-after- touchdown three times, twice called for off-sides when many observers felt he wasn't." During his time at Tennessee, the Volunteers did not lose a regular season game.

"Robert Neyland never wanted to answer when asked, ’Who were your greatest players?’ But, when pressed, he would reluctantly answer, ’I’ll start a team, but will not attempt to complete it. You’ll have to start with Bob Suffridge the greatest lineman I ever saw and that’s as far as I will go with the line. For a backfield, you’ll start with Gene McEver, the greatest I ever coached.’"

Suffridge was inducted into the College Football Hall of Fame in 1961. He was also honored as a member of the all-time Southeastern Conference team in 1982 and was chosen by the Football Writers Association for the all-time All America team.

== Professional career ==
Suffridge was drafted in the sixth round (42nd overall) of the 1941 NFL draft by the Pittsburgh Steelers, and played for the Philadelphia Eagles in 1941 and 1945. His career was shortened due to World War II. During the war, Suffridge was a lieutenant commander in the United States Navy.

Suffridge made the All-Pro team in 1941. Again Suffridge's speed was noticed. On one occasion Suffridge blocked three consecutive punts but was penalized for being offsides each time.

"That last offside will cost you $50", Coach Greasy Neale told him. "But I wasn’t offside", Suffridge protested. "That’ll cost you $50 more." "I said I wasn’t offside." "Make it one hundred." "I’m telling you, I wasn’t offside." "It’s now $200." Unwilling to argue the point past $200, Suff sat down. Neale finally told him he would look at the movies. "If you were offside, the $200 fine sticks. If you weren’t, I’ll give you a hundred." The movie showed beyond question that Suffridge had not been offside. "I got the hundred", he said, "the easiest hundred I ever made."

== Coaching career ==
Suffridge coached at North Carolina State University from 1946 to 1951. He was a line coach for the Wolfpack.

== See also ==
- 1940 College Football All-America Team
