= 1939 Orange Bowl =

American college football game

- 5th Orange Bowl
- Burdine Stadium in Miami, Florida, hosted the Orange Bowl.
Oklahoma Sooners	Tennessee Volunteers
(10–0)	(10–0)
Big Six	SEC
0	17
Head coach: Thomas E. Stidham	Head coach: Robert Neyland
AP 4	AP 2
	1	2	3	4	Total
Oklahoma	0	0	0	0	0
Tennessee	7	3	0	7	17
- Date: January 2, 1939
- Season: 1938
- Stadium: Burdine Stadium
- Location: Miami, Florida
- Referee: Lou Ervin (SEC; split crew: SEC, Big Six)
- Attendance: 32,191

The 1939 Orange Bowl was a postseason American college football bowl game, held in Miami, Florida, on January 2, 1939.

The game between the Tennessee and the Oklahoma Sooners concluded the 1938 college football season. It was the fifth edition of the Orange Bowl and took place at the Orange Bowl stadium, then known as Roddey Burdine Stadium. Both teams entered the game undefeated and untied; Tennessee was a slight favorite, and shut out the Sooners, 17–0.

The head coaches were Tom Stidham of Oklahoma and Bob Neyland of Tennessee.
