= Bowden Wyatt =

American football player, coach, and athletic director (1917–1969)

Biographical details
- Born: October 4, 1917; Kingston, Tennessee, U.S.
- Died: January 21, 1969 (aged 51); Sweetwater, Tennessee, U.S.

Playing career
- 1936–1938: Tennessee
- 1943: Del Monte Pre-Flight
- Position: End

Coaching career (HC unless noted)
- 1939–1941: Mississippi State (assistant)
- 1946: Mississippi State (assistant)
- 1947–1952: Wyoming
- 1953–1954: Arkansas
- 1955–1962: Tennessee
- 1964–1965: Oklahoma State (assistant)

Administrative career (AD unless noted)
- 1962–1963: Tennessee

Head coaching record
- Overall: 99–56–5
- Bowls: 2–2

Accomplishments and honors

Championships
- 2 Skyline Six / Skyline (1949–1950); 1 SWC (1954); 1 SEC (1956)

Awards
- AFCA Coach of the Year (1956); SEC Coach of the Year (1956); Consensus All-American (1938); First-team All-SEC (1938)
- College Football Hall of Fame; Inducted in 1972 (player), 1997 (coach) (profile)

Clarence Bowden Wyatt (October 4, 1917 – January 21, 1969) was an American football player and coach. Wyatt played college football at the University of Tennessee and was later the head football coach at three schools, the University of Wyoming (1947–1952), the University of Arkansas (1953–1954), and his alma mater, Tennessee (1955–1962). He compiled a 99–56–5 record in 16 seasons as a head coach.

In Wyoming, Wyatt turned around a team that had struggled under previous coach Bunny Oakes and had operated intermittently in the previous years because of World War II. His turnaround plan involved a round-the-clock training regimen, one that defensive back Marv Levy would later note did not allow players adequate time to complete their academic studies (leading Levy to transfer to Coe College). Wyatt's plan would secure Wyoming a perfect season and a win in the 1951 Gator Bowl.

Wyatt's most notable victory at Tennessee came on November 7, 1959, when his Tennessee Volunteers football Volunteers upset top-ranked LSU, 14–13, by stopping a two-point conversion attempt by eventual Heisman Trophy winner Billy Cannon late in the game. The victory ended the Tigers' 18-game winning streak.

Wyatt was elected to the College Football Hall of Fame in 1972 as a player and again in 1997 as a coach.

== Personal life and death ==
Wyatt married Mary Alson Miller around 1940. They had one daughter named Mary Gail "Missy", born in 1942.

Wyatt died of viral pneumonia on January 21, 1969, at hospital in Sweetwater, Tennessee.

== Head coaching record ==
| Year | Team | Overall | Conference | Standing | Bowl/playoffs | Coaches^{#} | AP^{°} |
|---|---|---|---|---|---|---|---|
Wyoming Cowboys (Mountain States / Skyline Six / Skyline Conference) (1947–1952)
| 1947 | Wyoming | 4–5 | 2–4 | 6th | | | |
| 1948 | Wyoming | 4–5 | 0–5 | 6th | | | |
| 1949 | Wyoming | 9–1 | 5–0 | 1st | | | |
| 1950 | Wyoming | 10–0 | 5–0 | 1st | W Gator | 14 | 12 |
| 1951 | Wyoming | 7–2–1 | 5–1–1 | 2nd | | | |
| 1952 | Wyoming | 5–4 | 4–3 | 4th | | | |
| Wyoming: | | 39–17–1 | 21–13–1 | | | | |
Arkansas Razorbacks (Southwest Conference) (1953–1954)
| 1953 | Arkansas | 3–7 | 2–4 | 5th | | | |
| 1954 | Arkansas | 8–3 | 5–1 | 1st | L Cotton | 8 | 10 |
| Arkansas: | | 11–10 | 7–5 | | | | |
Tennessee Volunteers (Southeastern Conference) (1955–1962)
| 1955 | Tennessee | 6–3–1 | 3–2–1 | 5th | | | |
| 1956 | Tennessee | 10–1 | 6–0 | 1st | L Sugar | 2 | 2 |
| 1957 | Tennessee | 8–3 | 4–3 | 5th | W Gator | 16 | 13 |
| 1958 | Tennessee | 4–6 | 4–3 | 5th | | | |
| 1959 | Tennessee | 5–4–1 | 3–4–1 | 8th | | | |
| 1960 | Tennessee | 6–2–2 | 3–2–2 | 5th | | 19 | |
| 1961 | Tennessee | 6–4 | 4–3 | T–4th | | | |
| 1962 | Tennessee | 4–6 | 2–6 | 10th | | | |
| Tennessee: | | 49–29–4 | 29–23–4 | | | | |
| Total: | | 99–56–5 | | | | | |
National championship Conference title Conference division title or championship game berth
^{#}Rankings from final Coaches Poll.; ^{°}Rankings from final AP Poll.
