= Spike Nelson =

American football player and coach (1906–1998)

Biographical details
- Born: April 2, 1906; Cherokee, Iowa, U.S.
- Died: October 30, 1998 (aged 92); Laguna Hills, California, U.S.

Playing career
- 1925–1927: Iowa
- Position: Tackle

Coaching career (HC unless noted)
- 1931: Iowa (line)
- 1932–1937: LSU (line)
- 1938: Mississippi State
- 1939–1940: Yale (line)
- 1941: Yale
- 1942: Saint Mary's Pre-Flight (assistant)
- 1943: Saint Mary's Pre-Flight

Head coaching record
- Overall: 8–17–1

Accomplishments and honors

Awards
- Second-team All-American (1926); First-team All-Big Ten (1926); Second-team All-Big Ten (1927)

Emerson William "Spike" Nelson (April 2, 1906 – October 20, 1998) was an American college football player and coach. He served as the head football coach at Mississippi State College, now Mississippi State University, in 1938 and at Yale University in 1941, compiling a career head coaching record of 5–13. He played college football as a tackle at the University of Iowa and was selected as a first-team tackle by the New York Sun on its 1926 College Football All-America Team. He was also selected as a second-team All-American by the Associated Press and Central Press.

Nelson was also an All-American hammer thrower and discus thrower for the Iowa Hawkeyes track and field team, finishing third in the hammer throw at the 1926 NCAA Track and Field Championships.

== Head coaching record ==
Year	Team	Overall	Conference	Standing	Bowl/playoffs
Mississippi State Maroons (Southeastern Conference) (1938)
1938	Mississippi State	4–6	1–4	11th	
Mississippi State:		4–6	1–4		
Yale Bulldogs (Independent) (1941)
1941	Yale	1–7			
Yale:		1–7			
Saint Mary's Pre-Flight Air Devils (Independent) (1943)
1943	Saint Mary's Pre-Flight	3–4–1			
Saint Mary's Pre-Flight:		3–4–1			
Total:		8–17–1			
