= Vic Bradford =

American baseball player (1915–1994)

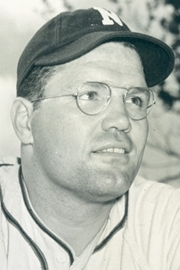
- Outfielder
- Born: March 5, 1915; Brownsville, Tennessee, U.S.
- Died: June 10, 1994 (aged 79); Paris, Kentucky, U.S.
- Batted: Right Threw: Right

MLB debut
- May 1, 1943, for the New York Giants

Last MLB appearance
- May 14, 1943, for the New York Giants

MLB statistics
- Batting average: .200
- Hits: 1
- Home runs: 0
- Runs batted in: 1
- Stats at Baseball Reference

Teams
- New York Giants (1943)

Henry Victor Bradford (March 5, 1915 – June 10, 1994) was an American outfielder in Major League Baseball. As an amateur athlete, Bradford was a blocking back for the University of Alabama football team, the Crimson Tide, and played in the 1938 Rose Bowl Game. A multi-sport athlete, he was signed by the New York Giants in 1943. After his poor eyesight was fixed by surgery, his military draft status changed from 3-A to 1-A and he enlisted in the Navy's Aviation Cadet Training Program located on the University of North Carolina at Chapel Hill campus.
