= 1938 Western Kentucky State Teachers Hilltoppers football team =

American college football season

1938 Western Kentucky State Teachers Hilltoppers football

KIAC co-champion
- Conference: Kentucky Intercollegiate Athletic Conference, Southern Intercollegiate Athletic Association
- Record: 7–2 (2–0 KIAC, 4–1 SIAA)
- Head coach: Gander Terry (1st season)
- Captain: Tom Triplett
- Alternate captain: Joe Gili
- Home stadium: Western Stadium

1938 Kentucky Intercollegiate Athletic Conference football standings
	Conf.					Overall
Team	W		L		T	W		L		T
Centre +	2	–	0	–	0	7	–	2	–	0
Western Kentucky State Teachers +	2	–	0	–	0	7	–	2	–	0
Eastern Kentucky	3	–	1	–	1	6	–	1	–	1
Morehead State	2	–	1	–	1	5	–	1	–	1
Murray State	1	–	1	–	0	6	–	2	–	1
Georgetown (KY)	2	–	3	–	0	4	–	4	–	0
Union (KY)	1	–	2	–	0	4	–	4	–	0
Transylvania	2	–	4	–	0	3	–	5	–	0
Louisville	0	–	3	–	0	2	–	6	–	0
+ – Conference co-champions

1938 Southern Intercollegiate Athletic Association football standings
	Conf.					Overall
Team	W		L		T	W		L		T
West Tennessee State Teachers $	7	–	0	–	0	10	–	0	–	0
Centre	4	–	0	–	0	7	–	2	–	0
Miami (FL)	3	–	0	–	0	8	–	2	–	0
Centenary	2	–	0	–	0	7	–	4	–	0
Mississippi State Teachers	6	–	1	–	0	7	–	2	–	0
Presbyterian	6	–	1	–	0	6	–	4	–	0
Mississippi College	5	–	1	–	0	7	–	2	–	0
Western Kentucky State Teachers	4	–	1	–	0	7	–	2	–	0
SW Louisiana	4	–	1	–	1	8	–	2	–	1
Murray State	4	–	1	–	0	6	–	2	–	1
Tennessee Tech	4	–	1	–	0	6	–	3	–	0
Eastern Kentucky	3	–	1	–	1	6	–	1	–	1
Morehead State	2	–	1	–	1	5	–	1	–	1
Stetson	4	–	2	–	1	6	–	2	–	1
Newberry	4	–	2	–	0	5	–	5	–	0
Rollins	3	–	2	–	1	6	–	2	–	1
Louisiana Normal	3	–	3	–	0	5	–	5	–	0
Georgetown (KY)	2	–	3	–	0	4	–	4	–	0
Union (TN)	2	–	3	–	0	4	–	6	–	0
Louisiana College	2	–	4	–	1	4	–	4	–	1
Union (KY)	1	–	2	–	0	4	–	4	–	0
Transylvania	2	–	4	–	0	3	–	5	–	0
Louisiana Tech	2	–	4	–	0	3	–	7	–	1
Delta State	2	–	5	–	0	2	–	7	–	0
Oglethorpe	2	–	5	–	0	2	–	9	–	0
Middle Tennessee State Teachers	1	–	5	–	0	2	–	6	–	0
Howard (AL)	0	–	2	–	0	2	–	5	–	0
Emory and Henry	0	–	2	–	0	1	–	6	–	2
Louisville	0	–	3	–	0	2	–	6	–	0
Troy State	0	–	3	–	1	3	–	4	–	1
Jacksonville State	0	–	3	–	1	1	–	6	–	1
Erskine	0	–	3	–	1	1	–	7	–	2
Tampa	0	–	4	–	0	3	–	7	–	0
Wofford	0	–	4	–	1	0	–	8	–	1
Millsaps	0	–	7	–	0	1	–	10	–	0
$ – Conference champion

The 1938 Western Kentucky State Teachers Hilltoppers football team represented Western Kentucky State Teachers College—now known as Western Kentucky University—as a member of the Kentucky Intercollegiate Athletic Conference (KIAC) and the Southern Intercollegiate Athletic Association (SIAA) during the 1938 college football season. Led by first-year head coach Gander Terry, the Hilltoppers compiled an overall record of 7–2 with marks of 2–0 in KIAC play and of 4–1 against SIAA opponents. Western Kentucky State Teachers shared the KIAC title with Centre.

Tom Triplett was the team's captain and Joe Gili was the alternate captain.

== Schedule ==
Date	Time	Opponent	Site	Result	Attendance	Source
September 24		Emporia State*	Bowling Green, KY	W 34–0		
October 1		at Vanderbilt*	Dudley Field; Nashville, TN	L 0–12	7,000	
October 8		Howard (AL)	Bowling Green, KY	W 6–0	3,500	
October 15	2:00 p.m.	Tennessee Tech	Western Stadium; Bowling Green, KY	L 6–7		
October 29		Western State Teachers*^{†}	Bowling Green, KY	W 13–6		
November 5		at Eastern Kentucky	Hanger Stadium; Richmond, KY (rivalry)	W 32–7		
November 12		Western Carolina*	Bowling Green, KY	W 55–0		
November 19		at Murray State	Cutchin Stadium; Murray, KY (rivalry)	W 21–7		
December 3		at Tampa	Phillips Field; Tampa, FL	W 50–7		
*Non-conference game; ^{†}Homecoming; All times are in Central time
