= 1938 Miami Hurricanes football team =

American college football season

1938 Miami Hurricanes football
- Conference: Southern Intercollegiate Athletic Association
- Record: 8–2 (3–0 SIAA)
- Head coach: Jack Harding (1st season)
- Home stadium: Burdine Stadium

1938 Southern Intercollegiate Athletic Association football standings
	Conf.					Overall
Team	W		L		T	W		L		T
West Tennessee State Teachers $	7	–	0	–	0	10	–	0	–	0
Centre	4	–	0	–	0	7	–	2	–	0
Miami (FL)	3	–	0	–	0	8	–	2	–	0
Centenary	2	–	0	–	0	7	–	4	–	0
Mississippi State Teachers	6	–	1	–	0	7	–	2	–	0
Presbyterian	6	–	1	–	0	6	–	4	–	0
Mississippi College	5	–	1	–	0	7	–	2	–	0
Western Kentucky State Teachers	4	–	1	–	0	7	–	2	–	0
SW Louisiana	4	–	1	–	1	8	–	2	–	1
Murray State	4	–	1	–	0	6	–	2	–	1
Tennessee Tech	4	–	1	–	0	6	–	3	–	0
Eastern Kentucky	3	–	1	–	1	6	–	1	–	1
Morehead State	2	–	1	–	1	5	–	1	–	1
Stetson	4	–	2	–	1	6	–	2	–	1
Newberry	4	–	2	–	0	5	–	5	–	0
Rollins	3	–	2	–	1	6	–	2	–	1
Louisiana Normal	3	–	3	–	0	5	–	5	–	0
Georgetown (KY)	2	–	3	–	0	4	–	4	–	0
Union (TN)	2	–	3	–	0	4	–	6	–	0
Louisiana College	2	–	4	–	1	4	–	4	–	1
Union (KY)	1	–	2	–	0	4	–	4	–	0
Transylvania	2	–	4	–	0	3	–	5	–	0
Louisiana Tech	2	–	4	–	0	3	–	7	–	1
Delta State	2	–	5	–	0	2	–	7	–	0
Oglethorpe	2	–	5	–	0	2	–	9	–	0
Middle Tennessee State Teachers	1	–	5	–	0	2	–	6	–	0
Howard (AL)	0	–	2	–	0	2	–	5	–	0
Emory and Henry	0	–	2	–	0	1	–	6	–	2
Louisville	0	–	3	–	0	2	–	6	–	0
Troy State	0	–	3	–	1	3	–	4	–	1
Jacksonville State	0	–	3	–	1	1	–	6	–	1
Erskine	0	–	3	–	1	1	–	7	–	2
Tampa	0	–	4	–	0	3	–	7	–	0
Wofford	0	–	4	–	1	0	–	8	–	1
Millsaps	0	–	7	–	0	1	–	10	–	0
$ – Conference champion

The 1938 Miami Hurricanes football team represented the University of Miami as a member of the Southern Intercollegiate Athletic Association (SIAA) in the 1938 college football season. The Hurricanes played their home games at Burdine Stadium in Miami, Florida. The team was coached by Jack Harding, in his second year as head coach for the Hurricanes.

== Schedule ==
Date	Opponent	Site	Result	Attendance	Source
September 30	Spring Hill*	Burdine Stadium; Miami, FL	W 40–0		
October 7	Tampa	Burdine Stadium; Miami, FL	W 32–6	12,000	
October 15	at Florida*	Florida Field; Gainesville, FL (rivalry)	W 19–7	15,000	
October 22	at Drake*	Drake Stadium; Des Moines, IA	L 6–18		
October 28	Rollins	Burdine Stadium; Miami, FL	W 19–0	12,153	
November 4	Oglethorpe	Burdine Stadium; Miami, FL	W 44–0	13,612	
November 11	Catholic University*	Brookland Stadium; Washington, DC	L 0–7		
November 18	Duquesne*	Burdine Stadium; Miami, FL	W 21–7	13,296	
November 24	Bucknell*	Burdine Stadium; Miami, FL	W 19–0		
December 2	Georgia*	Burdine Stadium; Miami, FL	W 13–7	23,367	
*Non-conference game
