= 1938 Mississippi State Teachers Yellow Jackets football team =

American college football season

1938 Mississippi State Teachers Yellow Jackets football
- Conference: Southern Intercollegiate Athletic Association
- Record: 7–2 (6–1 SIAA)
- Head coach: Reed Green (2nd season)
- Home stadium: Faulkner Field

1938 Southern Intercollegiate Athletic Association football standings
	Conf.					Overall
Team	W		L		T	W		L		T
West Tennessee State Teachers $	7	–	0	–	0	10	–	0	–	0
Centre	4	–	0	–	0	7	–	2	–	0
Miami (FL)	3	–	0	–	0	8	–	2	–	0
Centenary	2	–	0	–	0	7	–	4	–	0
Mississippi State Teachers	6	–	1	–	0	7	–	2	–	0
Presbyterian	6	–	1	–	0	6	–	4	–	0
Mississippi College	5	–	1	–	0	7	–	2	–	0
Western Kentucky State Teachers	4	–	1	–	0	7	–	2	–	0
SW Louisiana	4	–	1	–	1	8	–	2	–	1
Murray State	4	–	1	–	0	6	–	2	–	1
Tennessee Tech	4	–	1	–	0	6	–	3	–	0
Eastern Kentucky	3	–	1	–	1	6	–	1	–	1
Morehead State	2	–	1	–	1	5	–	1	–	1
Stetson	4	–	2	–	1	6	–	2	–	1
Newberry	4	–	2	–	0	5	–	5	–	0
Rollins	3	–	2	–	1	6	–	2	–	1
Louisiana Normal	3	–	3	–	0	5	–	5	–	0
Georgetown (KY)	2	–	3	–	0	4	–	4	–	0
Union (TN)	2	–	3	–	0	4	–	6	–	0
Louisiana College	2	–	4	–	1	4	–	4	–	1
Union (KY)	1	–	2	–	0	4	–	4	–	0
Transylvania	2	–	4	–	0	3	–	5	–	0
Louisiana Tech	2	–	4	–	0	3	–	7	–	1
Delta State	2	–	5	–	0	2	–	7	–	0
Oglethorpe	2	–	5	–	0	2	–	9	–	0
Middle Tennessee State Teachers	1	–	5	–	0	2	–	6	–	0
Howard (AL)	0	–	2	–	0	2	–	5	–	0
Emory and Henry	0	–	2	–	0	1	–	6	–	2
Louisville	0	–	3	–	0	2	–	6	–	0
Troy State	0	–	3	–	1	3	–	4	–	1
Jacksonville State	0	–	3	–	1	1	–	6	–	1
Erskine	0	–	3	–	1	1	–	7	–	2
Tampa	0	–	4	–	0	3	–	7	–	0
Wofford	0	–	4	–	1	0	–	8	–	1
Millsaps	0	–	7	–	0	1	–	10	–	0
$ – Conference champion

The 1938 Mississippi State Teachers Yellow Jackets football team was an American football team that represented the Mississippi State Teachers College (now known as the University of Southern Mississippi) as a member of the Southern Intercollegiate Athletic Association during the 1938 college football season. In their second year under head coach Reed Green, the team compiled a 7–2 record.

== Schedule ==
Date	Opponent	Site	Result	Attendance	Source
September 23	Arkansas A&M*	Faulkner Field; Hattiesburg, MS	W 39–0		
September 30	at Troy State	Wiregrass Memorial Stadium; Dothan, AL	W 19–0		
October 8	at Ole Miss*	Hemingway Stadium; Oxford, MS	L 0–14		
October 15	Delta State	Faulkner Field; Hattiesburg, MS	W 44–0		
October 28	Millsaps^{†}	Faulkner Field; Hattiesburg, MS	W 47–0	6,000	
November 5	at Louisiana College	Alumni Field; Pineville, LA	W 7–0		
November 11	Southwestern Louisiana	Faulkner Field; Hattiesburg, MS	W 15–6		
November 19	at Louisiana Normal	Demon Field; Natchitoches, LA	L 0–6		
November 24	Union (TN)	Faulkner Field; Hattiesburg, MS	W 32–0		
*Non-conference game; ^{†}Homecoming
