= 1938 Transylvania Pioneers football team =

American college football season

1938 Transylvania Pioneers football
- Conference: Kentucky Intercollegiate Athletic Conference, Southern Intercollegiate Athletic Association
- Record: 3–5 (2–4 KIAC, 2–4 SIAA)
- Head coach: Tate C. Page (1st season)
- Home stadium: Thomas Field

1938 Kentucky Intercollegiate Athletic Conference football standings
	Conf.					Overall
Team	W		L		T	W		L		T
Centre +	2	–	0	–	0	7	–	2	–	0
Western Kentucky State Teachers +	2	–	0	–	0	7	–	2	–	0
Eastern Kentucky	3	–	1	–	1	6	–	1	–	1
Morehead State	2	–	1	–	1	5	–	1	–	1
Murray State	1	–	1	–	0	6	–	2	–	1
Georgetown (KY)	2	–	3	–	0	4	–	4	–	0
Union (KY)	1	–	2	–	0	4	–	4	–	0
Transylvania	2	–	4	–	0	3	–	5	–	0
Louisville	0	–	3	–	0	2	–	6	–	0
+ – Conference co-champions

1938 Southern Intercollegiate Athletic Association football standings
	Conf.					Overall
Team	W		L		T	W		L		T
West Tennessee State Teachers $	7	–	0	–	0	10	–	0	–	0
Centre	4	–	0	–	0	7	–	2	–	0
Miami (FL)	3	–	0	–	0	8	–	2	–	0
Centenary	2	–	0	–	0	7	–	4	–	0
Mississippi State Teachers	6	–	1	–	0	7	–	2	–	0
Presbyterian	6	–	1	–	0	6	–	4	–	0
Mississippi College	5	–	1	–	0	7	–	2	–	0
Western Kentucky State Teachers	4	–	1	–	0	7	–	2	–	0
SW Louisiana	4	–	1	–	1	8	–	2	–	1
Murray State	4	–	1	–	0	6	–	2	–	1
Tennessee Tech	4	–	1	–	0	6	–	3	–	0
Eastern Kentucky	3	–	1	–	1	6	–	1	–	1
Morehead State	2	–	1	–	1	5	–	1	–	1
Stetson	4	–	2	–	1	6	–	2	–	1
Newberry	4	–	2	–	0	5	–	5	–	0
Rollins	3	–	2	–	1	6	–	2	–	1
Louisiana Normal	3	–	3	–	0	5	–	5	–	0
Georgetown (KY)	2	–	3	–	0	4	–	4	–	0
Union (TN)	2	–	3	–	0	4	–	6	–	0
Louisiana College	2	–	4	–	1	4	–	4	–	1
Union (KY)	1	–	2	–	0	4	–	4	–	0
Transylvania	2	–	4	–	0	3	–	5	–	0
Louisiana Tech	2	–	4	–	0	3	–	7	–	1
Delta State	2	–	5	–	0	2	–	7	–	0
Oglethorpe	2	–	5	–	0	2	–	9	–	0
Middle Tennessee State Teachers	1	–	5	–	0	2	–	6	–	0
Howard (AL)	0	–	2	–	0	2	–	5	–	0
Emory and Henry	0	–	2	–	0	1	–	6	–	2
Louisville	0	–	3	–	0	2	–	6	–	0
Troy State	0	–	3	–	1	3	–	4	–	1
Jacksonville State	0	–	3	–	1	1	–	6	–	1
Erskine	0	–	3	–	1	1	–	7	–	2
Tampa	0	–	4	–	0	3	–	7	–	0
Wofford	0	–	4	–	1	0	–	8	–	1
Millsaps	0	–	7	–	0	1	–	10	–	0
$ – Conference champion

The 1938 Transylvania Pioneers football team represented Transylvania University as a member of the Kentucky Intercollegiate Athletic Conference (KIAC) and the Southern Intercollegiate Athletic Association (SIAA) during the 1938 college football season. Led by first-year head coach Tate C. Page, the Pioneers compiled an overall record of 3–5 with a mark of 2–4 in both KIAC and SIAA play.

== Schedule ==
Date	Time	Opponent	Site	Result	Attendance	Source
September 30	2:30 p.m.	Eastern Kentucky	Thomas Field; Lexington, KY	L 0–7		
October 7		at Centre	Farris Stadium; Danville, KY	L 0–49		
October 15		at Xavier*	Xavier Stadium; Cincinnati, OH	L 6–52	2,000	
October 22		at Morehead State	Morehead, KY	L 0–21		
October 29		at Louisville	Maxwell Field; Louisville, KY	W 13–7		
November 5		Union (KY)^{†}	Thomas Field; Lexington, KY	W 14–7		
November 12		at Rio Grande*	Rio Grande, OH	W 19–6		
November 19		vs. Georgetown (KY)	Stoll Field; Lexington, KY	L 12–13		
*Non-conference game; ^{†}Homecoming; All times are in Eastern time
