= 1938 Millsaps Majors football team =

American college football season

1938 Millsaps Majors football
- Conference: Dixie Conference, Southern Intercollegiate Athletic Association
- Record: 1–10 (0–5 Dixie, 0–7 SIAA)
- Head coach: Tranny Lee Gaddy (8th season)
- Home stadium: Alumni Field

1938 Dixie Conference football standings
	Conf.					Overall
Team	W		L		T	W		L		T
Southwestern (TN) $	4	–	0	–	0	7	–	1	–	1
Mississippi College	4	–	1	–	0	7	–	2	–	0
Loyola (LA)	2	–	1	–	0	4	–	5	–	0
Howard (AL)	2	–	1	–	0	2	–	5	–	0
Chattanooga	3	–	2	–	0	4	–	5	–	0
Birmingham–Southern	4	–	3	–	0	4	–	5	–	0
Spring Hill	1	–	4	–	0	3	–	6	–	0
Mercer	0	–	3	–	0	3	–	6	–	0
Millsaps	0	–	5	–	0	1	–	10	–	0
$ – Conference champion

1938 Southern Intercollegiate Athletic Association football standings
	Conf.					Overall
Team	W		L		T	W		L		T
West Tennessee State Teachers $	7	–	0	–	0	10	–	0	–	0
Centre	4	–	0	–	0	7	–	2	–	0
Miami (FL)	3	–	0	–	0	8	–	2	–	0
Centenary	2	–	0	–	0	7	–	4	–	0
Mississippi State Teachers	6	–	1	–	0	7	–	2	–	0
Presbyterian	6	–	1	–	0	6	–	4	–	0
Mississippi College	5	–	1	–	0	7	–	2	–	0
Western Kentucky State Teachers	4	–	1	–	0	7	–	2	–	0
SW Louisiana	4	–	1	–	1	8	–	2	–	1
Murray State	4	–	1	–	0	6	–	2	–	1
Tennessee Tech	4	–	1	–	0	6	–	3	–	0
Eastern Kentucky	3	–	1	–	1	6	–	1	–	1
Morehead State	2	–	1	–	1	5	–	1	–	1
Stetson	4	–	2	–	1	6	–	2	–	1
Newberry	4	–	2	–	0	5	–	5	–	0
Rollins	3	–	2	–	1	6	–	2	–	1
Louisiana Normal	3	–	3	–	0	5	–	5	–	0
Georgetown (KY)	2	–	3	–	0	4	–	4	–	0
Union (TN)	2	–	3	–	0	4	–	6	–	0
Louisiana College	2	–	4	–	1	4	–	4	–	1
Union (KY)	1	–	2	–	0	4	–	4	–	0
Transylvania	2	–	4	–	0	3	–	5	–	0
Louisiana Tech	2	–	4	–	0	3	–	7	–	1
Delta State	2	–	5	–	0	2	–	7	–	0
Oglethorpe	2	–	5	–	0	2	–	9	–	0
Middle Tennessee State Teachers	1	–	5	–	0	2	–	6	–	0
Howard (AL)	0	–	2	–	0	2	–	5	–	0
Emory and Henry	0	–	2	–	0	1	–	6	–	2
Louisville	0	–	3	–	0	2	–	6	–	0
Troy State	0	–	3	–	1	3	–	4	–	1
Jacksonville State	0	–	3	–	1	1	–	6	–	1
Erskine	0	–	3	–	1	1	–	7	–	2
Tampa	0	–	4	–	0	3	–	7	–	0
Wofford	0	–	4	–	1	0	–	8	–	1
Millsaps	0	–	7	–	0	1	–	10	–	0
$ – Conference champion

The 1938 Millsaps Majors football team was an American football team that represented Millsaps College as a member of the Dixie Conference and the Southern Intercollegiate Athletic Association (SIAA) in the 1938 college football season. Led by Tranny Lee Gaddy in his eighth season as head coach, the team compiled an overall record of 1–10, with a mark of 0–5 in Dixie and 0–7 in SIAA conference play.

== Schedule ==
Date	Time	Opponent	Site	Result	Attendance	Source
September 16	8:00 p.m.	West Tennessee State Teachers	Alumni Field; Jackson, MS	L 0–19		
September 23		at Louisiana Tech	Tech Stadium; Ruston, LA	L 7–19	4,000	
September 29		Arkansas A&M*	Alumni Field; Jackson, MS	W 10–0		
October 7		Union (TN)	Alumni Field; Jackson, MS	L 0–12		
October 15		vs. Mississippi College	Municipal Stadium; Jackson, MS (rivalry)	L 0–21		
October 21		at Southwestern Louisiana	Campus Athletic Field; Lafayette, LA	L 0–13		
October 28		at Mississippi State Teachers	Faulkner Field; Hattiesburg, MS	L 0–47	6,000	
November 4		at Birmingham–Southern	Legion Field; Birmingham, AL	L 0–20		
November 12		at Southwestern (TN)	Crump Stadium; Memphis, TN	L 0–42	5,000	
November 24		at Spring Hill	Dorn Stadium; Mobile, AL	L 0–26		
November 19		vs. Mississippi College	Municipal Stadium; Jackson, MS	L 0–32		
*Non-conference game; All times are in Central time
