= 1938 Tennessee Tech Golden Eagles football team =

American college football season

1938 Tennessee Tech Golden Eagles football
- Conference: Southern Intercollegiate Athletic Association
- Record: 6–3 (4–1 SIAA)
- Head coach: Preston Vaughn Overall (16th season)
- Home stadium: Tech Field

1938 Southern Intercollegiate Athletic Association football standings
	Conf.					Overall
Team	W		L		T	W		L		T
West Tennessee State Teachers $	7	–	0	–	0	10	–	0	–	0
Centre	4	–	0	–	0	7	–	2	–	0
Miami (FL)	3	–	0	–	0	8	–	2	–	0
Centenary	2	–	0	–	0	7	–	4	–	0
Mississippi State Teachers	6	–	1	–	0	7	–	2	–	0
Presbyterian	6	–	1	–	0	6	–	4	–	0
Mississippi College	5	–	1	–	0	7	–	2	–	0
Western Kentucky State Teachers	4	–	1	–	0	7	–	2	–	0
SW Louisiana	4	–	1	–	1	8	–	2	–	1
Murray State	4	–	1	–	0	6	–	2	–	1
Tennessee Tech	4	–	1	–	0	6	–	3	–	0
Eastern Kentucky	3	–	1	–	1	6	–	1	–	1
Morehead State	2	–	1	–	1	5	–	1	–	1
Stetson	4	–	2	–	1	6	–	2	–	1
Newberry	4	–	2	–	0	5	–	5	–	0
Rollins	3	–	2	–	1	6	–	2	–	1
Louisiana Normal	3	–	3	–	0	5	–	5	–	0
Georgetown (KY)	2	–	3	–	0	4	–	4	–	0
Union (TN)	2	–	3	–	0	4	–	6	–	0
Louisiana College	2	–	4	–	1	4	–	4	–	1
Union (KY)	1	–	2	–	0	4	–	4	–	0
Transylvania	2	–	4	–	0	3	–	5	–	0
Louisiana Tech	2	–	4	–	0	3	–	7	–	1
Delta State	2	–	5	–	0	2	–	7	–	0
Oglethorpe	2	–	5	–	0	2	–	9	–	0
Middle Tennessee State Teachers	1	–	5	–	0	2	–	6	–	0
Howard (AL)	0	–	2	–	0	2	–	5	–	0
Emory and Henry	0	–	2	–	0	1	–	6	–	2
Louisville	0	–	3	–	0	2	–	6	–	0
Troy State	0	–	3	–	1	3	–	4	–	1
Jacksonville State	0	–	3	–	1	1	–	6	–	1
Erskine	0	–	3	–	1	1	–	7	–	2
Tampa	0	–	4	–	0	3	–	7	–	0
Wofford	0	–	4	–	1	0	–	8	–	1
Millsaps	0	–	7	–	0	1	–	10	–	0
$ – Conference champion

The 1938 Tennessee Tech Golden Eagles football team represented Tennessee Polytechnic Institute (TPI)—now known as Tennessee Tech–as a member of the Southern Intercollegiate Athletic Association (SIAA) during the 1938 college football season. Led by 16th-year head coach Preston Vaughn Overall, the Golden Eagles compiled an overall record of 6–3 with a mark of 4–1 in conference play.

== Schedule ==
Date	Time	Opponent	Site	Result	Attendance	Source
September 23	7:00 p.m.	at Chattanooga*	Chamberlain Field; Chattanooga, TN	L 6–27	4,000	
September 30		Jacksonville State	Cookeville, TN	W 21–0		
October 7	8:00 p.m.	Middle Tennessee State Teachers	Tech Field; Cookeville, TN	W 7–0	2,500	
October 15	2:00 p.m.	at Western Kentucky State Teachers	Western Stadium; Bowling Green, KY	W 7–6		
October 21	8:00 p.m.	West Tennessee State Teachers	Cookeville, TN	L 13–26		
October 29		at Sewanee*	Hardee Field; Sewanee, TN	W 7–6		
November 4	2:00 p.m.	at Cumberland (TN)*	Lebanon, TN	L 0–6		
November 11	2:00 p.m.	Austin Peay*^{†}	Tech Field; Cookeville, TN	W 28–0	1,000	
November 24	2:00 p.m.	at Middle Tennessee State Teachers	Horace Jones Field; Murfreesboro, TN	W 12–0	2,500	
*Non-conference game; ^{†}Homecoming; All times are in Central time
