= 1938 Centenary Gentlemen football team =

American college football season

1938 Centenary Gentlemen football
- Conference: Southern Intercollegiate Athletic Association
- Record: 7–4 (2–0 SIAA)
- Head coach: Curtis Parker (5th season)
- Home stadium: Centenary Field

1938 Southern Intercollegiate Athletic Association football standings
	Conf.					Overall
Team	W		L		T	W		L		T
West Tennessee State Teachers $	7	–	0	–	0	10	–	0	–	0
Centre	4	–	0	–	0	7	–	2	–	0
Miami (FL)	3	–	0	–	0	8	–	2	–	0
Centenary	2	–	0	–	0	7	–	4	–	0
Mississippi State Teachers	6	–	1	–	0	7	–	2	–	0
Presbyterian	6	–	1	–	0	6	–	4	–	0
Mississippi College	5	–	1	–	0	7	–	2	–	0
Western Kentucky State Teachers	4	–	1	–	0	7	–	2	–	0
SW Louisiana	4	–	1	–	1	8	–	2	–	1
Murray State	4	–	1	–	0	6	–	2	–	1
Tennessee Tech	4	–	1	–	0	6	–	3	–	0
Eastern Kentucky	3	–	1	–	1	6	–	1	–	1
Morehead State	2	–	1	–	1	5	–	1	–	1
Stetson	4	–	2	–	1	6	–	2	–	1
Newberry	4	–	2	–	0	5	–	5	–	0
Rollins	3	–	2	–	1	6	–	2	–	1
Louisiana Normal	3	–	3	–	0	5	–	5	–	0
Georgetown (KY)	2	–	3	–	0	4	–	4	–	0
Union (TN)	2	–	3	–	0	4	–	6	–	0
Louisiana College	2	–	4	–	1	4	–	4	–	1
Union (KY)	1	–	2	–	0	4	–	4	–	0
Transylvania	2	–	4	–	0	3	–	5	–	0
Louisiana Tech	2	–	4	–	0	3	–	7	–	1
Delta State	2	–	5	–	0	2	–	7	–	0
Oglethorpe	2	–	5	–	0	2	–	9	–	0
Middle Tennessee State Teachers	1	–	5	–	0	2	–	6	–	0
Howard (AL)	0	–	2	–	0	2	–	5	–	0
Emory and Henry	0	–	2	–	0	1	–	6	–	2
Louisville	0	–	3	–	0	2	–	6	–	0
Troy State	0	–	3	–	1	3	–	4	–	1
Jacksonville State	0	–	3	–	1	1	–	6	–	1
Erskine	0	–	3	–	1	1	–	7	–	2
Tampa	0	–	4	–	0	3	–	7	–	0
Wofford	0	–	4	–	1	0	–	8	–	1
Millsaps	0	–	7	–	0	1	–	10	–	0
$ – Conference champion

The 1938 Centenary Gentlemen football team was an American football team that represented the Centenary College of Louisiana as a member of the Southern Intercollegiate Athletic Association during the 1938 college football season. In their fifth year under head coach Curtis Parker, the team compiled a 7–4 record.

== Schedule ==
Date	Opponent	Site	Result	Attendance	Source
September 17	Louisiana Normal	Fairgrounds Stadium; Shreveport, LA	W 14–0	7,500	
September 24	at TCU*	T.C.U. Stadium; Fort Worth, TX	L 0–13		
October 1	at Hardin–Simmons*	Parramore Field; Abilene, TX	W 26–13	4,500	
October 8	at Southwestern (TN)*	Crump Stadium; Memphis, TN	W 6–0		
October 15	at Baylor*	Waco Stadium; Waco, TX	L 0–14		
October 22	at Ole Miss*	Hemingway Stadium; Oxford, MS	L 14–47	7,000	
October 30	Loyola (CA)*	Fairgrounds Stadium; Shreveport, LA	W 7–6	10,000	
November 5	Arizona*^{†}	Fairgrounds Stadium; Shreveport, LA	L 6–7	6,500	
November 12	at Mississippi State*	Ray Stadium; Meridian, MS	W 19–0	5,000	
November 19	DePaul*	Centenary Field; Shreveport, LA	W 48–0	6,000	
November 24	Louisiana Tech	Centenary Field; Shreveport, LA	W 14–7	5,500	
*Non-conference game; ^{†}Homecoming
