= 1938 Troy State Red Wave football team =

American college football season

1938 Troy State Red Wave football
- Conference: Southern Intercollegiate Athletic Association
- Record: 3–4–1 (0–3–1 SIAA)
- Head coach: Albert Choate (2nd season)
- Home stadium: Pace Field

1938 Southern Intercollegiate Athletic Association football standings
	Conf.					Overall
Team	W		L		T	W		L		T
West Tennessee State Teachers $	7	–	0	–	0	10	–	0	–	0
Centre	4	–	0	–	0	7	–	2	–	0
Miami (FL)	3	–	0	–	0	8	–	2	–	0
Centenary	2	–	0	–	0	7	–	4	–	0
Mississippi State Teachers	6	–	1	–	0	7	–	2	–	0
Presbyterian	6	–	1	–	0	6	–	4	–	0
Mississippi College	5	–	1	–	0	7	–	2	–	0
Western Kentucky State Teachers	4	–	1	–	0	7	–	2	–	0
SW Louisiana	4	–	1	–	1	8	–	2	–	1
Murray State	4	–	1	–	0	6	–	2	–	1
Tennessee Tech	4	–	1	–	0	6	–	3	–	0
Eastern Kentucky	3	–	1	–	1	6	–	1	–	1
Morehead State	2	–	1	–	1	5	–	1	–	1
Stetson	4	–	2	–	1	6	–	2	–	1
Newberry	4	–	2	–	0	5	–	5	–	0
Rollins	3	–	2	–	1	6	–	2	–	1
Louisiana Normal	3	–	3	–	0	5	–	5	–	0
Georgetown (KY)	2	–	3	–	0	4	–	4	–	0
Union (TN)	2	–	3	–	0	4	–	6	–	0
Louisiana College	2	–	4	–	1	4	–	4	–	1
Union (KY)	1	–	2	–	0	4	–	4	–	0
Transylvania	2	–	4	–	0	3	–	5	–	0
Louisiana Tech	2	–	4	–	0	3	–	7	–	1
Delta State	2	–	5	–	0	2	–	7	–	0
Oglethorpe	2	–	5	–	0	2	–	9	–	0
Middle Tennessee State Teachers	1	–	5	–	0	2	–	6	–	0
Howard (AL)	0	–	2	–	0	2	–	5	–	0
Emory and Henry	0	–	2	–	0	1	–	6	–	2
Louisville	0	–	3	–	0	2	–	6	–	0
Troy State	0	–	3	–	1	3	–	4	–	1
Jacksonville State	0	–	3	–	1	1	–	6	–	1
Erskine	0	–	3	–	1	1	–	7	–	2
Tampa	0	–	4	–	0	3	–	7	–	0
Wofford	0	–	4	–	1	0	–	8	–	1
Millsaps	0	–	7	–	0	1	–	10	–	0
$ – Conference champion

The 1938 Troy State Red Wave football team represented Troy State Teachers College (now known as Troy University) as a member of the Southern Intercollegiate Athletic Association (SIAA) during the 1938 college football season. Led by second-year head coach Albert Choate, the Red Wave compiled an overall record of 3–4–1, with a mark of 0–3–1 in conference play, tying for 29th place in the SIAA

== Schedule ==
Date	Opponent	Site	Result	Attendance	Source
September 26	South Georgia*	Pace Field; Troy, AL	W 27–0		
September 30	Mississippi State Teachers	Wiregrass Memorial Stadium; Dothan, AL	L 0–19		
October 14	at South Georgia Teachers*	Statesboro, GA	W 7–0		
October 22	at Delta State	Delta Field; Cleveland, MS	L 0–6		
October 29	Marion*^{†}	Pace Field; Troy, AL	W 19–0		
November 5	at West Tennessee State	Crump Stadium; Memphis, TN	L 6–20	2,500	
November 11	at Jacksonville State	Jacksonville Field; Jacksonville, AL (rivalry)	T 6–6		
November 26	at Tennessee Wesleyan*	Athens, TN	L 6–32		
*Non-conference game; ^{†}Homecoming

=== Freshman team schedule ===
Date	Time	Opponent	Site	Result	Source
October 29	2:30 p.m.	Greensboro Business College	Pace Field; Troy, AL	L 12–13	
November 18	2:30 p.m.	at Livingston State	McConnel Field; Livingston, AL	W 14–6	
All times are in Central time
