= 1938 Howard Bulldogs football team =

American college football season

1938 Howard Bulldogs football
- Conference: Dixie Conference, Southern Intercollegiate Athletic Association
- Record: 2–5 (2–1 Dixie, 0–2 SIAA)
- Head coach: Billy Bancroft (4th season)
- Home stadium: Legion Field

1938 Dixie Conference football standings
	Conf.					Overall
Team	W		L		T	W		L		T
Southwestern (TN) $	4	–	0	–	0	7	–	1	–	1
Mississippi College	4	–	1	–	0	7	–	2	–	0
Loyola (LA)	2	–	1	–	0	4	–	5	–	0
Howard (AL)	2	–	1	–	0	2	–	5	–	0
Chattanooga	3	–	2	–	0	4	–	5	–	0
Birmingham–Southern	4	–	3	–	0	4	–	5	–	0
Spring Hill	1	–	4	–	0	3	–	6	–	0
Mercer	0	–	3	–	0	3	–	6	–	0
Millsaps	0	–	5	–	0	1	–	10	–	0
$ – Conference champion

1938 Southern Intercollegiate Athletic Association football standings
	Conf.					Overall
Team	W		L		T	W		L		T
West Tennessee State Teachers $	7	–	0	–	0	10	–	0	–	0
Centre	4	–	0	–	0	7	–	2	–	0
Miami (FL)	3	–	0	–	0	8	–	2	–	0
Centenary	2	–	0	–	0	7	–	4	–	0
Mississippi State Teachers	6	–	1	–	0	7	–	2	–	0
Presbyterian	6	–	1	–	0	6	–	4	–	0
Mississippi College	5	–	1	–	0	7	–	2	–	0
Western Kentucky State Teachers	4	–	1	–	0	7	–	2	–	0
SW Louisiana	4	–	1	–	1	8	–	2	–	1
Murray State	4	–	1	–	0	6	–	2	–	1
Tennessee Tech	4	–	1	–	0	6	–	3	–	0
Eastern Kentucky	3	–	1	–	1	6	–	1	–	1
Morehead State	2	–	1	–	1	5	–	1	–	1
Stetson	4	–	2	–	1	6	–	2	–	1
Newberry	4	–	2	–	0	5	–	5	–	0
Rollins	3	–	2	–	1	6	–	2	–	1
Louisiana Normal	3	–	3	–	0	5	–	5	–	0
Georgetown (KY)	2	–	3	–	0	4	–	4	–	0
Union (TN)	2	–	3	–	0	4	–	6	–	0
Louisiana College	2	–	4	–	1	4	–	4	–	1
Union (KY)	1	–	2	–	0	4	–	4	–	0
Transylvania	2	–	4	–	0	3	–	5	–	0
Louisiana Tech	2	–	4	–	0	3	–	7	–	1
Delta State	2	–	5	–	0	2	–	7	–	0
Oglethorpe	2	–	5	–	0	2	–	9	–	0
Middle Tennessee State Teachers	1	–	5	–	0	2	–	6	–	0
Howard (AL)	0	–	2	–	0	2	–	5	–	0
Emory and Henry	0	–	2	–	0	1	–	6	–	2
Louisville	0	–	3	–	0	2	–	6	–	0
Troy State	0	–	3	–	1	3	–	4	–	1
Jacksonville State	0	–	3	–	1	1	–	6	–	1
Erskine	0	–	3	–	1	1	–	7	–	2
Tampa	0	–	4	–	0	3	–	7	–	0
Wofford	0	–	4	–	1	0	–	8	–	1
Millsaps	0	–	7	–	0	1	–	10	–	0
$ – Conference champion

The 1938 Howard Bulldogs football team was an American football team that represented Howard College—now known as the Samford University—as a member of the Dixie Conference and the Southern Intercollegiate Athletic Association (SIAA) during the 1938 college football season. In their fourth year under head coach Billy Bancroft, the Bulldogs compiled an overall record of 2–5 with mark of 2–1 in Dixie Conference play and 0–2 against SIAA opponents.

== Schedule ==
Date	Opponent	Site	Result	Attendance	Source
September 24	at Mississippi State	Scott Field; Starkville, MS	L 0–19		
October 1	at Alabama*	Denny Stadium; Tuscaloosa, AL	L 0–34	8,000	
October 8	at Western Kentucky State Teachers	Western Stadium; Bowling Green, KY	L 0–6	3,500	
October 21	at Chattanooga	Chamberlain Field; Chattanooga, TN	L 6–13	3,900	
October 28	Spring Hill	Legion Field; Birmingham, AL	W 26–0		
November 11	at Murray State	Cutchin Stadium; Murray, KY	L 7–27		
November 19	vs. Birmingham–Southern	Legion Field; Birmingham, AL	W 25–0	4,000	
*Non-conference game
