= 1938 West Tennessee State Teachers football team =

American college football season

1938 West Tennessee State Teachers football

SIAA champion
- Conference: Southern Intercollegiate Athletic Association
- Record: 10–0 (7–0 SIAA)
- Head coach: Allyn McKeen (2nd season)
- Captain: Roland MacMackin
- Home stadium: Crump Stadium

1938 Southern Intercollegiate Athletic Association football standings
	Conf.					Overall
Team	W		L		T	W		L		T
West Tennessee State Teachers $	7	–	0	–	0	10	–	0	–	0
Centre	4	–	0	–	0	7	–	2	–	0
Miami (FL)	3	–	0	–	0	8	–	2	–	0
Centenary	2	–	0	–	0	7	–	4	–	0
Mississippi State Teachers	6	–	1	–	0	7	–	2	–	0
Presbyterian	6	–	1	–	0	6	–	4	–	0
Mississippi College	5	–	1	–	0	7	–	2	–	0
Western Kentucky State Teachers	4	–	1	–	0	7	–	2	–	0
SW Louisiana	4	–	1	–	1	8	–	2	–	1
Murray State	4	–	1	–	0	6	–	2	–	1
Tennessee Tech	4	–	1	–	0	6	–	3	–	0
Eastern Kentucky	3	–	1	–	1	6	–	1	–	1
Morehead State	2	–	1	–	1	5	–	1	–	1
Stetson	4	–	2	–	1	6	–	2	–	1
Newberry	4	–	2	–	0	5	–	5	–	0
Rollins	3	–	2	–	1	6	–	2	–	1
Louisiana Normal	3	–	3	–	0	5	–	5	–	0
Georgetown (KY)	2	–	3	–	0	4	–	4	–	0
Union (TN)	2	–	3	–	0	4	–	6	–	0
Louisiana College	2	–	4	–	1	4	–	4	–	1
Union (KY)	1	–	2	–	0	4	–	4	–	0
Transylvania	2	–	4	–	0	3	–	5	–	0
Louisiana Tech	2	–	4	–	0	3	–	7	–	1
Delta State	2	–	5	–	0	2	–	7	–	0
Oglethorpe	2	–	5	–	0	2	–	9	–	0
Middle Tennessee State Teachers	1	–	5	–	0	2	–	6	–	0
Howard (AL)	0	–	2	–	0	2	–	5	–	0
Emory and Henry	0	–	2	–	0	1	–	6	–	2
Louisville	0	–	3	–	0	2	–	6	–	0
Troy State	0	–	3	–	1	3	–	4	–	1
Jacksonville State	0	–	3	–	1	1	–	6	–	1
Erskine	0	–	3	–	1	1	–	7	–	2
Tampa	0	–	4	–	0	3	–	7	–	0
Wofford	0	–	4	–	1	0	–	8	–	1
Millsaps	0	–	7	–	0	1	–	10	–	0
$ – Conference champion

The 1938 West Tennessee State Teachers football team was an American football that represented West Tennessee State Teachers College (now known as the University of Memphis) as a member of the Southern Intercollegiate Athletic Association (SIAA) during the 1938 college football season. In its second season under head coach Allyn McKeen, the team compiled a perfect 10–0 record (7–0 against conference opponents), won the SIAA championship, and outscored opponents by a total of 281 to 41. Roland MacMackin was the team captain.

== Schedule ==
Date	Time	Opponent	Site	Result	Attendance	Source
September 16	8:00 p.m.	at Millsaps	Alumni Field; Jackson, MS	W 19–0		
September 24		Louisiana College	Crump Stadium; Memphis, TN	W 14–6		
October 1		at Arkansas State*	Kays Stadium; Jonesboro, AR (rivalry)	W 38–2		
October 8		Cumberland (TN)*	Crump Stadium; Memphis, TN	W 68–0		
October 15		Middle Tennessee State Teachers	Crump Stadium; Memphis, TN	W 25–7		
October 21	8:00 p.m.	at Tennessee Tech	Cookeville, TN	W 26–13		
October 29		Arkansas A&M*	Crump Stadium; Memphis, TN	W 50–0		
November 5		Troy State^{†}	Crump Stadium; Memphis, TN	W 20–6	2,500	
November 11		Union (TN)	Crump Stadium; Memphis, TN	W 13–7	4,000	
November 18		at Delta State	Cleveland, MS	W 8–0		
*Non-conference game; ^{†}Homecoming; All times are in Central time
