= 1938 Murray State Thoroughbreds football team =

American college football season

1938 Murray State Thoroughbreds football
- Conference: Kentucky Intercollegiate Athletic Conference, Southern Intercollegiate Athletic Association
- Record: 6–2–1 (1–1 KIAC, 4–1 SIAA)
- Head coach: Roy Stewart (7th season)
- Home stadium: Cutchin Stadium

1938 Kentucky Intercollegiate Athletic Conference football standings
	Conf.					Overall
Team	W		L		T	W		L		T
Centre +	2	–	0	–	0	7	–	2	–	0
Western Kentucky State Teachers +	2	–	0	–	0	7	–	2	–	0
Eastern Kentucky	3	–	1	–	1	6	–	1	–	1
Morehead State	2	–	1	–	1	5	–	1	–	1
Murray State	1	–	1	–	0	6	–	2	–	1
Georgetown (KY)	2	–	3	–	0	4	–	4	–	0
Union (KY)	1	–	2	–	0	4	–	4	–	0
Transylvania	2	–	4	–	0	3	–	5	–	0
Louisville	0	–	3	–	0	2	–	6	–	0
+ – Conference co-champions

1938 Southern Intercollegiate Athletic Association football standings
	Conf.					Overall
Team	W		L		T	W		L		T
West Tennessee State Teachers $	7	–	0	–	0	10	–	0	–	0
Centre	4	–	0	–	0	7	–	2	–	0
Miami (FL)	3	–	0	–	0	8	–	2	–	0
Centenary	2	–	0	–	0	7	–	4	–	0
Mississippi State Teachers	6	–	1	–	0	7	–	2	–	0
Presbyterian	6	–	1	–	0	6	–	4	–	0
Mississippi College	5	–	1	–	0	7	–	2	–	0
Western Kentucky State Teachers	4	–	1	–	0	7	–	2	–	0
SW Louisiana	4	–	1	–	1	8	–	2	–	1
Murray State	4	–	1	–	0	6	–	2	–	1
Tennessee Tech	4	–	1	–	0	6	–	3	–	0
Eastern Kentucky	3	–	1	–	1	6	–	1	–	1
Morehead State	2	–	1	–	1	5	–	1	–	1
Stetson	4	–	2	–	1	6	–	2	–	1
Newberry	4	–	2	–	0	5	–	5	–	0
Rollins	3	–	2	–	1	6	–	2	–	1
Louisiana Normal	3	–	3	–	0	5	–	5	–	0
Georgetown (KY)	2	–	3	–	0	4	–	4	–	0
Union (TN)	2	–	3	–	0	4	–	6	–	0
Louisiana College	2	–	4	–	1	4	–	4	–	1
Union (KY)	1	–	2	–	0	4	–	4	–	0
Transylvania	2	–	4	–	0	3	–	5	–	0
Louisiana Tech	2	–	4	–	0	3	–	7	–	1
Delta State	2	–	5	–	0	2	–	7	–	0
Oglethorpe	2	–	5	–	0	2	–	9	–	0
Middle Tennessee State Teachers	1	–	5	–	0	2	–	6	–	0
Howard (AL)	0	–	2	–	0	2	–	5	–	0
Emory and Henry	0	–	2	–	0	1	–	6	–	2
Louisville	0	–	3	–	0	2	–	6	–	0
Troy State	0	–	3	–	1	3	–	4	–	1
Jacksonville State	0	–	3	–	1	1	–	6	–	1
Erskine	0	–	3	–	1	1	–	7	–	2
Tampa	0	–	4	–	0	3	–	7	–	0
Wofford	0	–	4	–	1	0	–	8	–	1
Millsaps	0	–	7	–	0	1	–	10	–	0
$ – Conference champion

The 1938 Murray State Thoroughbreds football team represented Murray State Teachers College—now known as Murray State University—as a member of the Kentucky Intercollegiate Athletic Conference (KIAC) and the Southern Intercollegiate Athletic Association (SIAA) during the 1938 college football season. Led by seventh-year head coach Roy Stewart, the Thoroughbreds compiled an overall record of 6–2–1 mark of 1–1 in KIAC play and 4–1 against SIAA opponents.

== Schedule ==
Date	Opponent	Site	Result	Attendance	Source
September 16	at Superior State*	Superior, WI	W 26–0		
September 30	at Middle Tennessee State Teachers	Horace Jones Field; Murfreesboro, TN	W 34–0	2,500–3,000	
October 8	at Morehead State	Morehead, KY	W 14–0		
October 15	Birmingham–Southern*	Cutchin Stadium; Murray, KY	W 47–14	6,000	
October 22	vs. Hardin–Simmons*	Keiler Field; Paducah, KY	L 14–20		
October 28	at Union (TN)	Rothrock Field; Jackson, TN	W 30–0		
November 4	Southwestern (TN)*	Cutchin Stadium; Murray, KY	T 6–6		
November 11	Howard (AL)	Cutchin Stadium; Murray, KY	W 27–7		
November 19	Western Kentucky State Teachers	Cutchin Stadium; Murray, KY (rivalry)	L 7–21		
*Non-conference game
