= 1938 Centre Colonels football team =

American college football season

1938 Centre Colonels football

KIAC co-champion
- Conference: Kentucky Intercollegiate Athletic Conference, Southern Intercollegiate Athletic Association
- Record: 7–2 (2–0 KIAC, 4–0 SIAA)
- Head coach: J. Quinn Decker (1st season)
- Home stadium: Farris Stadium

1938 Kentucky Intercollegiate Athletic Conference football standings
	Conf.					Overall
Team	W		L		T	W		L		T
Centre +	2	–	0	–	0	7	–	2	–	0
Western Kentucky State Teachers +	2	–	0	–	0	7	–	2	–	0
Eastern Kentucky	3	–	1	–	1	6	–	1	–	1
Morehead State	2	–	1	–	1	5	–	1	–	1
Murray State	1	–	1	–	0	6	–	2	–	1
Georgetown (KY)	2	–	3	–	0	4	–	4	–	0
Union (KY)	1	–	2	–	0	4	–	4	–	0
Transylvania	2	–	4	–	0	3	–	5	–	0
Louisville	0	–	3	–	0	2	–	6	–	0
+ – Conference co-champions

1938 Southern Intercollegiate Athletic Association football standings
	Conf.					Overall
Team	W		L		T	W		L		T
West Tennessee State Teachers $	7	–	0	–	0	10	–	0	–	0
Centre	4	–	0	–	0	7	–	2	–	0
Miami (FL)	3	–	0	–	0	8	–	2	–	0
Centenary	2	–	0	–	0	7	–	4	–	0
Mississippi State Teachers	6	–	1	–	0	7	–	2	–	0
Presbyterian	6	–	1	–	0	6	–	4	–	0
Mississippi College	5	–	1	–	0	7	–	2	–	0
Western Kentucky State Teachers	4	–	1	–	0	7	–	2	–	0
SW Louisiana	4	–	1	–	1	8	–	2	–	1
Murray State	4	–	1	–	0	6	–	2	–	1
Tennessee Tech	4	–	1	–	0	6	–	3	–	0
Eastern Kentucky	3	–	1	–	1	6	–	1	–	1
Morehead State	2	–	1	–	1	5	–	1	–	1
Stetson	4	–	2	–	1	6	–	2	–	1
Newberry	4	–	2	–	0	5	–	5	–	0
Rollins	3	–	2	–	1	6	–	2	–	1
Louisiana Normal	3	–	3	–	0	5	–	5	–	0
Georgetown (KY)	2	–	3	–	0	4	–	4	–	0
Union (TN)	2	–	3	–	0	4	–	6	–	0
Louisiana College	2	–	4	–	1	4	–	4	–	1
Union (KY)	1	–	2	–	0	4	–	4	–	0
Transylvania	2	–	4	–	0	3	–	5	–	0
Louisiana Tech	2	–	4	–	0	3	–	7	–	1
Delta State	2	–	5	–	0	2	–	7	–	0
Oglethorpe	2	–	5	–	0	2	–	9	–	0
Middle Tennessee State Teachers	1	–	5	–	0	2	–	6	–	0
Howard (AL)	0	–	2	–	0	2	–	5	–	0
Emory and Henry	0	–	2	–	0	1	–	6	–	2
Louisville	0	–	3	–	0	2	–	6	–	0
Troy State	0	–	3	–	1	3	–	4	–	1
Jacksonville State	0	–	3	–	1	1	–	6	–	1
Erskine	0	–	3	–	1	1	–	7	–	2
Tampa	0	–	4	–	0	3	–	7	–	0
Wofford	0	–	4	–	1	0	–	8	–	1
Millsaps	0	–	7	–	0	1	–	10	–	0
$ – Conference champion

The 1938 Centre Colonels football team represented Centre College as a member of the Kentucky Intercollegiate Athletic Conference (KIAC) and the Southern Intercollegiate Athletic Association (SIAA) during the 1938 college football season. Led by first-year head coach J. Quinn Decker, the Colonels compiled an overall record of 7–2 with marks of 2–0 in KIAC play and 4–0 against SIAA opponents. Centre shared the KIAC title with Western Kentucky State Teachers.

== Schedule ==
Date	Opponent	Site	Result	Attendance	Source
September 24	Mississippi College	Farris Stadium; Danville, KY	W 13–0	3,000	
October 1	Chattanooga*	Farris Stadium; Danville, KY	W 16–7		
October 7	Transylvania	Farris Stadium; Danville, KY	W 49–0		
October 15	at Villanova*	Shibe Park; Philadelphia, PA	L 6–35	10,000	
October 22	Presbyterian^{†}	Farris Stadium; Danville, KY	W 26–7		
October 29	at Washington University*	Francis Field; St. Louis, MO	L 7–20	4,500	
November 5	vs. Washington and Lee*	duPont Manual Stadium; Louisville, KY	W 7–0	7,500	
November 12	at Ohio Wesleyan*	Selby Field; Delaware, OH	W 26–0		
November 19	at Louisville	duPont Manual Stadium; Louisville, KY	W 14–0		
*Non-conference game; ^{†}Homecoming
