= 1938 Louisiana Tech Bulldogs football team =

American college football season

1938 Louisiana Tech Bulldogs football
- Conference: Southern Intercollegiate Athletic Association
- Record: 3–7–1 (2–4 SIAA)
- Head coach: Eddie McLane (5th season)
- Captain: Huey Williamson
- Home stadium: Tech Stadium

1938 Southern Intercollegiate Athletic Association football standings
	Conf.					Overall
Team	W		L		T	W		L		T
West Tennessee State Teachers $	7	–	0	–	0	10	–	0	–	0
Centre	4	–	0	–	0	7	–	2	–	0
Miami (FL)	3	–	0	–	0	8	–	2	–	0
Centenary	2	–	0	–	0	7	–	4	–	0
Mississippi State Teachers	6	–	1	–	0	7	–	2	–	0
Presbyterian	6	–	1	–	0	6	–	4	–	0
Mississippi College	5	–	1	–	0	7	–	2	–	0
Western Kentucky State Teachers	4	–	1	–	0	7	–	2	–	0
SW Louisiana	4	–	1	–	1	8	–	2	–	1
Murray State	4	–	1	–	0	6	–	2	–	1
Tennessee Tech	4	–	1	–	0	6	–	3	–	0
Eastern Kentucky	3	–	1	–	1	6	–	1	–	1
Morehead State	2	–	1	–	1	5	–	1	–	1
Stetson	4	–	2	–	1	6	–	2	–	1
Newberry	4	–	2	–	0	5	–	5	–	0
Rollins	3	–	2	–	1	6	–	2	–	1
Louisiana Normal	3	–	3	–	0	5	–	5	–	0
Georgetown (KY)	2	–	3	–	0	4	–	4	–	0
Union (TN)	2	–	3	–	0	4	–	6	–	0
Louisiana College	2	–	4	–	1	4	–	4	–	1
Union (KY)	1	–	2	–	0	4	–	4	–	0
Transylvania	2	–	4	–	0	3	–	5	–	0
Louisiana Tech	2	–	4	–	0	3	–	7	–	1
Delta State	2	–	5	–	0	2	–	7	–	0
Oglethorpe	2	–	5	–	0	2	–	9	–	0
Middle Tennessee State Teachers	1	–	5	–	0	2	–	6	–	0
Howard (AL)	0	–	2	–	0	2	–	5	–	0
Emory and Henry	0	–	2	–	0	1	–	6	–	2
Louisville	0	–	3	–	0	2	–	6	–	0
Troy State	0	–	3	–	1	3	–	4	–	1
Jacksonville State	0	–	3	–	1	1	–	6	–	1
Erskine	0	–	3	–	1	1	–	7	–	2
Tampa	0	–	4	–	0	3	–	7	–	0
Wofford	0	–	4	–	1	0	–	8	–	1
Millsaps	0	–	7	–	0	1	–	10	–	0
$ – Conference champion

The 1938 Louisiana Tech Bulldogs football team was an American football team that represented the Louisiana Polytechnic Institute (now known as Louisiana Tech University) as a member of the Southern Intercollegiate Athletic Association during the 1938 college football season. In their fifth year under head coach Eddie McLane, the team compiled a 3–7–1 record. Huey Williamson was the team's captain.

== Schedule ==
Date	Opponent	Site	Result	Attendance	Source
September 16	Mississippi College	Tech Stadium; Ruston, LA	L 13–26		
September 23	Millsaps	Tech Stadium; Ruston, LA	W 19–7	4,000	
October 1	at Ole Miss*	Hemingway Stadium; Oxford, MS	L 7–27		
October 8	at Mississippi State*	Scott Field; Starkville, MS	L 0–48	8,000	
October 22	vs. Louisiana Normal	State Fair Stadium; Shreveport, LA (rivalry)	L 6–7	5,500	
October 27	at Oklahoma City*	Taft Stadium; Oklahoma City, OK	L 6–7		
November 4	at Southwestern Louisiana	Campus Athletic Field; Lafayette, LA (rivalry)	L 7–27		
November 11	Louisiana College	Tech Stadium; Ruston, LA	W 7–0	2,000	
November 19	Cornell (IA)*	Tech Stadium; Ruston, LA	W 26–0	5,000	
November 24	at Centenary	Centenary College Stadium; Shreveport, LA	L 7–14	5,500	
December 3	Southeastern Louisiana	Tech Stadium; Ruston, LA	T 0–0	3,000	
*Non-conference game
