= 1938 Union (Tennessee) Bulldogs football team =

American college football season

1938 Union (Tennessee) Bulldogs football
- Conference: Southern Intercollegiate Athletic Association
- Record: 4–6 (2–3 SIAA)
- Head coach: Fred DeLay (2nd season)
- Home stadium: Rothrock Field

1938 Southern Intercollegiate Athletic Association football standings
	Conf.					Overall
Team	W		L		T	W		L		T
West Tennessee State Teachers $	7	–	0	–	0	10	–	0	–	0
Centre	4	–	0	–	0	7	–	2	–	0
Miami (FL)	3	–	0	–	0	8	–	2	–	0
Centenary	2	–	0	–	0	7	–	4	–	0
Mississippi State Teachers	6	–	1	–	0	7	–	2	–	0
Presbyterian	6	–	1	–	0	6	–	4	–	0
Mississippi College	5	–	1	–	0	7	–	2	–	0
Western Kentucky State Teachers	4	–	1	–	0	7	–	2	–	0
SW Louisiana	4	–	1	–	1	8	–	2	–	1
Murray State	4	–	1	–	0	6	–	2	–	1
Tennessee Tech	4	–	1	–	0	6	–	3	–	0
Eastern Kentucky	3	–	1	–	1	6	–	1	–	1
Morehead State	2	–	1	–	1	5	–	1	–	1
Stetson	4	–	2	–	1	6	–	2	–	1
Newberry	4	–	2	–	0	5	–	5	–	0
Rollins	3	–	2	–	1	6	–	2	–	1
Louisiana Normal	3	–	3	–	0	5	–	5	–	0
Georgetown (KY)	2	–	3	–	0	4	–	4	–	0
Union (TN)	2	–	3	–	0	4	–	6	–	0
Louisiana College	2	–	4	–	1	4	–	4	–	1
Union (KY)	1	–	2	–	0	4	–	4	–	0
Transylvania	2	–	4	–	0	3	–	5	–	0
Louisiana Tech	2	–	4	–	0	3	–	7	–	1
Delta State	2	–	5	–	0	2	–	7	–	0
Oglethorpe	2	–	5	–	0	2	–	9	–	0
Middle Tennessee State Teachers	1	–	5	–	0	2	–	6	–	0
Howard (AL)	0	–	2	–	0	2	–	5	–	0
Emory and Henry	0	–	2	–	0	1	–	6	–	2
Louisville	0	–	3	–	0	2	–	6	–	0
Troy State	0	–	3	–	1	3	–	4	–	1
Jacksonville State	0	–	3	–	1	1	–	6	–	1
Erskine	0	–	3	–	1	1	–	7	–	2
Tampa	0	–	4	–	0	3	–	7	–	0
Wofford	0	–	4	–	1	0	–	8	–	1
Millsaps	0	–	7	–	0	1	–	10	–	0
$ – Conference champion

The 1938 Union Bulldogs football team was an American football team that represented Union University of Jackson, Tennessee, as a member of the Southern Intercollegiate Athletic Association (SIAA) during the 1938 college football season. Led by Fred DeLay in his second season as head coach, the Bulldogs compiled a record of 4–6, with a mark of 2–3 in conference play.

== Schedule ==
Date	Opponent	Site	Result	Attendance	Source
September 16	vs. Jacksonville State	Benson Field; Decatur, AL	W 7–0	1,500	
September 23	Southwestern (TN)*	Rothrock Field; Jackson, TN	L 0–47	6,000	
September 29	Austin Peay*	Rothrock Field; Jackson, TN	W 19–0		
October 7	at Millsaps	Alumni Field; Jackson, MS	W 12–0		
October 14	Cumberland (TN)*	Rothrock Field; Jackson, TN	W 20–13		
October 21	at Spring Hill*	Dorn Stadium; Mobile, AL	L 7–14		
October 28	Murray State	Rothrock Field; Jackson, TN	L 0–30		
November 11	at West Tennessee State	Crump Stadium; Memphis, TN	L 7–13	4,000	
November 18	at Hendrix*	Young Memorial Stadium; Conway, AR	L 0–6		
November 24	at Mississippi State Teachers	Faulkner Field; Hattiesburg, MS	L 0–32		
*Non-conference game
