= 1938 Middle Tennessee State Teachers Blue Raiders football team =

American college football season

1938 Middle Tennessee State Teachers Blue Raiders football
- Conference: Southern Intercollegiate Athletic Association
- Record: 2–6 (1–5 SIAA)
- Head coach: Johnny Floyd (5th season)
- Captains: J. B. Thompson; William Hoffman
- Home stadium: Horace Jones Field

1938 Southern Intercollegiate Athletic Association football standings
	Conf.					Overall
Team	W		L		T	W		L		T
West Tennessee State Teachers $	7	–	0	–	0	10	–	0	–	0
Centre	4	–	0	–	0	7	–	2	–	0
Miami (FL)	3	–	0	–	0	8	–	2	–	0
Centenary	2	–	0	–	0	7	–	4	–	0
Mississippi State Teachers	6	–	1	–	0	7	–	2	–	0
Presbyterian	6	–	1	–	0	6	–	4	–	0
Mississippi College	5	–	1	–	0	7	–	2	–	0
Western Kentucky State Teachers	4	–	1	–	0	7	–	2	–	0
SW Louisiana	4	–	1	–	1	8	–	2	–	1
Murray State	4	–	1	–	0	6	–	2	–	1
Tennessee Tech	4	–	1	–	0	6	–	3	–	0
Eastern Kentucky	3	–	1	–	1	6	–	1	–	1
Morehead State	2	–	1	–	1	5	–	1	–	1
Stetson	4	–	2	–	1	6	–	2	–	1
Newberry	4	–	2	–	0	5	–	5	–	0
Rollins	3	–	2	–	1	6	–	2	–	1
Louisiana Normal	3	–	3	–	0	5	–	5	–	0
Georgetown (KY)	2	–	3	–	0	4	–	4	–	0
Union (TN)	2	–	3	–	0	4	–	6	–	0
Louisiana College	2	–	4	–	1	4	–	4	–	1
Union (KY)	1	–	2	–	0	4	–	4	–	0
Transylvania	2	–	4	–	0	3	–	5	–	0
Louisiana Tech	2	–	4	–	0	3	–	7	–	1
Delta State	2	–	5	–	0	2	–	7	–	0
Oglethorpe	2	–	5	–	0	2	–	9	–	0
Middle Tennessee State Teachers	1	–	5	–	0	2	–	6	–	0
Howard (AL)	0	–	2	–	0	2	–	5	–	0
Emory and Henry	0	–	2	–	0	1	–	6	–	2
Louisville	0	–	3	–	0	2	–	6	–	0
Troy State	0	–	3	–	1	3	–	4	–	1
Jacksonville State	0	–	3	–	1	1	–	6	–	1
Erskine	0	–	3	–	1	1	–	7	–	2
Tampa	0	–	4	–	0	3	–	7	–	0
Wofford	0	–	4	–	1	0	–	8	–	1
Millsaps	0	–	7	–	0	1	–	10	–	0
$ – Conference champion

The 1938 Middle Tennessee State Teachers football team represented the Middle Tennessee State Teachers College (now known as Middle Tennessee State University) as a member of the Southern Intercollegiate Athletic Association (SIAA) during the 1938 college football season. Led by Johnny Floyd in his fifth season as head coach, Middle Tennessee State Teachers compiled an overall record of 2–6 with a mark of 1–5 in conference play. The team's captains were J. B. Thompson and William Hoffman.

== Schedule ==
Date	Time	Opponent	Site	Result	Attendance	Source
September 23		Jacksonville State	Horace Jones Field; Murfreesboro, TN	W 13–0		
September 30		Murray State	Horace Jones Field; Murfreesboro, TN	L 0–34	2,500–3,000	
October 7	8:00 p.m.	at Tennessee Tech	Tech Field; Cookeville, TN	L 0–7	2,500	
October 15		at West Tennessee State Teachers	Crump Stadium; Memphis, TN	L 7–26		
October 21		Tusculum*	Horace Jones Field; Murfreesboro, TN	W 39–0		
October 28		Tennessee Wesleyan*	Horace Jones Field; Murfreesboro, TN	L 6–12		
November 11		at Delta State	Cleveland, MS	L 0–25		
November 24	2:00 p.m.	Tennessee Tech	Horace Jones Field; Murfreesboro, TN	L 0–12	2,500	
*Non-conference game; All times are in Central time
