= 1938 Jacksonville State Eagle Owls football team =

American college football season

1938 Jacksonville State Eagle Owls football
- Conference: Southern Intercollegiate Athletic Association
- Record: 1–6–1 (0–3–1 SIAA)
- Head coach: Chester C. Dillon (1st season)
- Home stadium: College Field

1938 Southern Intercollegiate Athletic Association football standings
	Conf.					Overall
Team	W		L		T	W		L		T
West Tennessee State Teachers $	7	–	0	–	0	10	–	0	–	0
Centre	4	–	0	–	0	7	–	2	–	0
Miami (FL)	3	–	0	–	0	8	–	2	–	0
Centenary	2	–	0	–	0	7	–	4	–	0
Mississippi State Teachers	6	–	1	–	0	7	–	2	–	0
Presbyterian	6	–	1	–	0	6	–	4	–	0
Mississippi College	5	–	1	–	0	7	–	2	–	0
Western Kentucky State Teachers	4	–	1	–	0	7	–	2	–	0
SW Louisiana	4	–	1	–	1	8	–	2	–	1
Murray State	4	–	1	–	0	6	–	2	–	1
Tennessee Tech	4	–	1	–	0	6	–	3	–	0
Eastern Kentucky	3	–	1	–	1	6	–	1	–	1
Morehead State	2	–	1	–	1	5	–	1	–	1
Stetson	4	–	2	–	1	6	–	2	–	1
Newberry	4	–	2	–	0	5	–	5	–	0
Rollins	3	–	2	–	1	6	–	2	–	1
Louisiana Normal	3	–	3	–	0	5	–	5	–	0
Georgetown (KY)	2	–	3	–	0	4	–	4	–	0
Union (TN)	2	–	3	–	0	4	–	6	–	0
Louisiana College	2	–	4	–	1	4	–	4	–	1
Union (KY)	1	–	2	–	0	4	–	4	–	0
Transylvania	2	–	4	–	0	3	–	5	–	0
Louisiana Tech	2	–	4	–	0	3	–	7	–	1
Delta State	2	–	5	–	0	2	–	7	–	0
Oglethorpe	2	–	5	–	0	2	–	9	–	0
Middle Tennessee State Teachers	1	–	5	–	0	2	–	6	–	0
Howard (AL)	0	–	2	–	0	2	–	5	–	0
Emory and Henry	0	–	2	–	0	1	–	6	–	2
Louisville	0	–	3	–	0	2	–	6	–	0
Troy State	0	–	3	–	1	3	–	4	–	1
Jacksonville State	0	–	3	–	1	1	–	6	–	1
Erskine	0	–	3	–	1	1	–	7	–	2
Tampa	0	–	4	–	0	3	–	7	–	0
Wofford	0	–	4	–	1	0	–	8	–	1
Millsaps	0	–	7	–	0	1	–	10	–	0
$ – Conference champion

The 1938 Jacksonville State Eagle Owls football team represented Jacksonville State Teachers College (now known as Jacksonville State University) as a member of the Southern Intercollegiate Athletic Association (SIAA) during the 1938 college football season. Led by first-year head coach Chester C. Dillon, the Eagle Owls compiled an overall record of 1–6–1 with a mark of 0–3–1 in conference play.

== Schedule ==
Date	Opponent	Site	Result	Attendance	Source
September 16	vs. Union (TN)	Benson Field; Decatur, AL	L 0–7	1,500	
September 23	at Middle Tennessee State	Horace Jones Field; Murfreesboro, TN	L 0–13		
September 30	at Tennessee Tech	Overhill Field; Cookeville, TN	L 0–21		
October 7	at Spring Hill*	Dorn Stadium; Mobile, AL	L 0–60		
October 14	at Marion*	Johnson Field; Marion, AL	W 20–7		
October 18	Snead*	College Field; Jacksonville, AL	L 0–6		
November 5	at Pensacola NAS*	Legion Field; Pensacola, FL	L 0–31		
November 11	Troy State	College Field; Jacksonville, AL (rivalry)	T 6–6		
*Non-conference game
