= 1938 Louisiana Normal Demons football team =

American college football season

1938 Louisiana Normal Demons football
- Conference: Southern Intercollegiate Athletic Association
- Record: 5–5 (3–3 SIAA)
- Head coach: Harry Turpin (5th season)
- Home stadium: Demon Field

1938 Southern Intercollegiate Athletic Association football standings
	Conf.					Overall
Team	W		L		T	W		L		T
West Tennessee State Teachers $	7	–	0	–	0	10	–	0	–	0
Centre	4	–	0	–	0	7	–	2	–	0
Miami (FL)	3	–	0	–	0	8	–	2	–	0
Centenary	2	–	0	–	0	7	–	4	–	0
Mississippi State Teachers	6	–	1	–	0	7	–	2	–	0
Presbyterian	6	–	1	–	0	6	–	4	–	0
Mississippi College	5	–	1	–	0	7	–	2	–	0
Western Kentucky State Teachers	4	–	1	–	0	7	–	2	–	0
SW Louisiana	4	–	1	–	1	8	–	2	–	1
Murray State	4	–	1	–	0	6	–	2	–	1
Tennessee Tech	4	–	1	–	0	6	–	3	–	0
Eastern Kentucky	3	–	1	–	1	6	–	1	–	1
Morehead State	2	–	1	–	1	5	–	1	–	1
Stetson	4	–	2	–	1	6	–	2	–	1
Newberry	4	–	2	–	0	5	–	5	–	0
Rollins	3	–	2	–	1	6	–	2	–	1
Louisiana Normal	3	–	3	–	0	5	–	5	–	0
Georgetown (KY)	2	–	3	–	0	4	–	4	–	0
Union (TN)	2	–	3	–	0	4	–	6	–	0
Louisiana College	2	–	4	–	1	4	–	4	–	1
Union (KY)	1	–	2	–	0	4	–	4	–	0
Transylvania	2	–	4	–	0	3	–	5	–	0
Louisiana Tech	2	–	4	–	0	3	–	7	–	1
Delta State	2	–	5	–	0	2	–	7	–	0
Oglethorpe	2	–	5	–	0	2	–	9	–	0
Middle Tennessee State Teachers	1	–	5	–	0	2	–	6	–	0
Howard (AL)	0	–	2	–	0	2	–	5	–	0
Emory and Henry	0	–	2	–	0	1	–	6	–	2
Louisville	0	–	3	–	0	2	–	6	–	0
Troy State	0	–	3	–	1	3	–	4	–	1
Jacksonville State	0	–	3	–	1	1	–	6	–	1
Erskine	0	–	3	–	1	1	–	7	–	2
Tampa	0	–	4	–	0	3	–	7	–	0
Wofford	0	–	4	–	1	0	–	8	–	1
Millsaps	0	–	7	–	0	1	–	10	–	0
$ – Conference champion

The 1938 Louisiana Normal Demons football team represented Louisiana State Normal School (now known as Northwestern State University) as a member the Southern Intercollegiate Athletic Association (SIAA) during the 1938 college football season. Led by fifth-year head coach Harry Turpin, the Demons compiled an overall record of 5–5, with a mark of 3–3 in conference play.

== Schedule ==
Date	Time	Opponent	Site	Result	Attendance	Source
September 17		at Centenary	State Fair Stadium; Shreveport, LA	L 0–14	7,500	
September 23	3:15 p.m.	East Texas State*	Demon Field; Natchitoches, LA	L 6–19	4,000	
September 30		at Sam Houston State*	Pritchett Field; Huntsville, TX	L 6–14		
October 7		Southeastern Louisiana*	Demon Field; Natchitoches, LA (rivalry)	W 6–0		
October 14		at Louisiana College	Alumni Field; Pineville, LA	L 14–17	3,500	
October 22		vs. Louisiana Tech	State Fair Stadium; Shreveport, LA (rivalry)	W 7–6	5,500	
October 29		Delta State^{†}	Demon Field; Natchitoches, LA	W 42–0		
November 4		at Stephen F. Austin*	Birdwell Field; Nacogdoches, TX (rivalry)	W 6–0		
November 19		Mississippi State Teachers	Demon Field; Natchitoches, LA	W 6–0		
November 24		at Southwestern Louisiana	Campus Athletic Field; Lafayette, LA	L 0–7		
*Non-conference game; ^{†}Homecoming; All times are in Central time
