= 1938 Southwestern Louisiana Bulldogs football team =

American college football season

1938 Southwestern Louisiana Bulldogs football
- Conference: Southern Intercollegiate Athletic Association
- Record: 8–2–1 (4–1–1 SIAA)
- Head coach: Johnny Cain (2nd season)
- Home stadium: Campus Athletic Field

1938 Southern Intercollegiate Athletic Association football standings
	Conf.					Overall
Team	W		L		T	W		L		T
West Tennessee State Teachers $	7	–	0	–	0	10	–	0	–	0
Centre	4	–	0	–	0	7	–	2	–	0
Miami (FL)	3	–	0	–	0	8	–	2	–	0
Centenary	2	–	0	–	0	7	–	4	–	0
Mississippi State Teachers	6	–	1	–	0	7	–	2	–	0
Presbyterian	6	–	1	–	0	6	–	4	–	0
Mississippi College	5	–	1	–	0	7	–	2	–	0
Western Kentucky State Teachers	4	–	1	–	0	7	–	2	–	0
SW Louisiana	4	–	1	–	1	8	–	2	–	1
Murray State	4	–	1	–	0	6	–	2	–	1
Tennessee Tech	4	–	1	–	0	6	–	3	–	0
Eastern Kentucky	3	–	1	–	1	6	–	1	–	1
Morehead State	2	–	1	–	1	5	–	1	–	1
Stetson	4	–	2	–	1	6	–	2	–	1
Newberry	4	–	2	–	0	5	–	5	–	0
Rollins	3	–	2	–	1	6	–	2	–	1
Louisiana Normal	3	–	3	–	0	5	–	5	–	0
Georgetown (KY)	2	–	3	–	0	4	–	4	–	0
Union (TN)	2	–	3	–	0	4	–	6	–	0
Louisiana College	2	–	4	–	1	4	–	4	–	1
Union (KY)	1	–	2	–	0	4	–	4	–	0
Transylvania	2	–	4	–	0	3	–	5	–	0
Louisiana Tech	2	–	4	–	0	3	–	7	–	1
Delta State	2	–	5	–	0	2	–	7	–	0
Oglethorpe	2	–	5	–	0	2	–	9	–	0
Middle Tennessee State Teachers	1	–	5	–	0	2	–	6	–	0
Howard (AL)	0	–	2	–	0	2	–	5	–	0
Emory and Henry	0	–	2	–	0	1	–	6	–	2
Louisville	0	–	3	–	0	2	–	6	–	0
Troy State	0	–	3	–	1	3	–	4	–	1
Jacksonville State	0	–	3	–	1	1	–	6	–	1
Erskine	0	–	3	–	1	1	–	7	–	2
Tampa	0	–	4	–	0	3	–	7	–	0
Wofford	0	–	4	–	1	0	–	8	–	1
Millsaps	0	–	7	–	0	1	–	10	–	0
$ – Conference champion

The 1938 Southwestern Louisiana Bulldogs football team was an American football team that represented the Southwestern Louisiana Institute of Liberal and Technical Learning (now known as the University of Louisiana at Lafayette) in the Southern Intercollegiate Athletic Association during the 1938 college football season. In their second year under head coach Johnny Cain, the team compiled a 8–2–1 record.

== Schedule ==
Date	Opponent	Site	Result	Attendance	Source
September 16	at Southeastern Louisiana*	Strawberry Stadium; Hammond, LA (rivalry)	W 8–0	2,000	
September 23	Delta State	Campus Athletic Field; Lafayette, LA	W 19–0		
September 30	at Stephen F. Austin*	Birdwell Field; Nacogdoches, TX	W 7–0		
October 7	Sam Houston State*	Campus Athletic Field; Lafayette, LA	W 14–0		
October 14	at Spring Hill*	Dorn Stadium; Mobile, AL	W 33–7		
October 21	Millsaps	Campus Athletic Field; Lafayette, LA	W 13–0		
October 29	at Louisiana College	Alumni Field; Pineville, LA	T 7–7	5,000	
November 4	Louisiana Tech	Campus Athletic Field; Lafayette, LA (rivalry)	W 27–7		
November 11	at Mississippi State Teachers	Faulkner Field; Hattiesburg, MS	L 6–15		
November 19	at LSU*	Tiger Stadium; Baton Rouge, LA	L 0–32		
November 24	Louisiana Normal	Campus Athletic Field; Lafayette, LA	W 7–0		
*Non-conference game
