= 1938 Tampa Spartans football team =

American college football season

1938 Tampa Spartans football
- Conference: Southern Intercollegiate Athletic Association
- Record: 3–7 (0–4 SIAA)
- Head coach: Nash Higgins (6th season)
- Home stadium: Phillips Field

1938 Southern Intercollegiate Athletic Association football standings
	Conf.					Overall
Team	W		L		T	W		L		T
West Tennessee State Teachers $	7	–	0	–	0	10	–	0	–	0
Centre	4	–	0	–	0	7	–	2	–	0
Miami (FL)	3	–	0	–	0	8	–	2	–	0
Centenary	2	–	0	–	0	7	–	4	–	0
Mississippi State Teachers	6	–	1	–	0	7	–	2	–	0
Presbyterian	6	–	1	–	0	6	–	4	–	0
Mississippi College	5	–	1	–	0	7	–	2	–	0
Western Kentucky State Teachers	4	–	1	–	0	7	–	2	–	0
SW Louisiana	4	–	1	–	1	8	–	2	–	1
Murray State	4	–	1	–	0	6	–	2	–	1
Tennessee Tech	4	–	1	–	0	6	–	3	–	0
Eastern Kentucky	3	–	1	–	1	6	–	1	–	1
Morehead State	2	–	1	–	1	5	–	1	–	1
Stetson	4	–	2	–	1	6	–	2	–	1
Newberry	4	–	2	–	0	5	–	5	–	0
Rollins	3	–	2	–	1	6	–	2	–	1
Louisiana Normal	3	–	3	–	0	5	–	5	–	0
Georgetown (KY)	2	–	3	–	0	4	–	4	–	0
Union (TN)	2	–	3	–	0	4	–	6	–	0
Louisiana College	2	–	4	–	1	4	–	4	–	1
Union (KY)	1	–	2	–	0	4	–	4	–	0
Transylvania	2	–	4	–	0	3	–	5	–	0
Louisiana Tech	2	–	4	–	0	3	–	7	–	1
Delta State	2	–	5	–	0	2	–	7	–	0
Oglethorpe	2	–	5	–	0	2	–	9	–	0
Middle Tennessee State Teachers	1	–	5	–	0	2	–	6	–	0
Howard (AL)	0	–	2	–	0	2	–	5	–	0
Emory and Henry	0	–	2	–	0	1	–	6	–	2
Louisville	0	–	3	–	0	2	–	6	–	0
Troy State	0	–	3	–	1	3	–	4	–	1
Jacksonville State	0	–	3	–	1	1	–	6	–	1
Erskine	0	–	3	–	1	1	–	7	–	2
Tampa	0	–	4	–	0	3	–	7	–	0
Wofford	0	–	4	–	1	0	–	8	–	1
Millsaps	0	–	7	–	0	1	–	10	–	0
$ – Conference champion

The 1938 Tampa Spartans football team represented the University of Tampa as a member the Southern Intercollegiate Athletic Association (SIAA) during the 1938 college football season. Led by sixth-year head coach Nash Higgins, the Spartans compiled an overall record of 3–7, with a mark of 0–4 in conference play.

== Schedule ==
Date	Time	Opponent	Site	Result	Attendance	Source
September 23	8:15 p.m.	South Georgia Teachers*	Phillips Field; Tampa, FL	W 40–0	5,000	
September 30		South Georgia*	Phillips Field; Tampa, FL	W 21–0	3,000	
October 7		at Miami (FL)	Burdine Stadium; Miami, FL	L 6–32	12,000	
October 15		Cincinnati*	Phillips Field; Tampa, FL	L 6–7	3,000	
October 22		Florida*	Phillips Field; Tampa, FL	L 0–33	10,000	
November 5		at Boston University*	Nickerson Field; Weston, MA	L 7–31		
November 11	2:30 p.m.	Stetson	Phillips Field; Tampa, FL	L 0–42	3,000	
November 18		University of Havana*	Phillips Field; Tampa, FL	W 33–0	4,000	
November 26		Rollins	Phillips Field; Tampa, FL	L 0–23	1,500	
December 3		Western Kentucky State Teachers	Phillips Field; Tampa, FL	L 7–50		
*Non-conference game; All times are in Eastern time
