= 1938 Presbyterian Blue Hose football team =

American college football season

1938 Presbyterian Blue Hose football
- Conference: Southern Intercollegiate Athletic Association
- Record: 6–4 (6–1 SIAA)
- Head coach: Walter A. Johnson (23rd season)
- Home stadium: Bailey Stadium

1938 Southern Intercollegiate Athletic Association football standings
	Conf.					Overall
Team	W		L		T	W		L		T
West Tennessee State Teachers $	7	–	0	–	0	10	–	0	–	0
Centre	4	–	0	–	0	7	–	2	–	0
Miami (FL)	3	–	0	–	0	8	–	2	–	0
Centenary	2	–	0	–	0	7	–	4	–	0
Mississippi State Teachers	6	–	1	–	0	7	–	2	–	0
Presbyterian	6	–	1	–	0	6	–	4	–	0
Mississippi College	5	–	1	–	0	7	–	2	–	0
Western Kentucky State Teachers	4	–	1	–	0	7	–	2	–	0
SW Louisiana	4	–	1	–	1	8	–	2	–	1
Murray State	4	–	1	–	0	6	–	2	–	1
Tennessee Tech	4	–	1	–	0	6	–	3	–	0
Eastern Kentucky	3	–	1	–	1	6	–	1	–	1
Morehead State	2	–	1	–	1	5	–	1	–	1
Stetson	4	–	2	–	1	6	–	2	–	1
Newberry	4	–	2	–	0	5	–	5	–	0
Rollins	3	–	2	–	1	6	–	2	–	1
Louisiana Normal	3	–	3	–	0	5	–	5	–	0
Georgetown (KY)	2	–	3	–	0	4	–	4	–	0
Union (TN)	2	–	3	–	0	4	–	6	–	0
Louisiana College	2	–	4	–	1	4	–	4	–	1
Union (KY)	1	–	2	–	0	4	–	4	–	0
Transylvania	2	–	4	–	0	3	–	5	–	0
Louisiana Tech	2	–	4	–	0	3	–	7	–	1
Delta State	2	–	5	–	0	2	–	7	–	0
Oglethorpe	2	–	5	–	0	2	–	9	–	0
Middle Tennessee State Teachers	1	–	5	–	0	2	–	6	–	0
Howard (AL)	0	–	2	–	0	2	–	5	–	0
Emory and Henry	0	–	2	–	0	1	–	6	–	2
Louisville	0	–	3	–	0	2	–	6	–	0
Troy State	0	–	3	–	1	3	–	4	–	1
Jacksonville State	0	–	3	–	1	1	–	6	–	1
Erskine	0	–	3	–	1	1	–	7	–	2
Tampa	0	–	4	–	0	3	–	7	–	0
Wofford	0	–	4	–	1	0	–	8	–	1
Millsaps	0	–	7	–	0	1	–	10	–	0
$ – Conference champion

The 1938 Presbyterian Blue Hose football team represented Presbyterian College as a member the Southern Intercollegiate Athletic Association (SIAA) during the 1938 college football season. Led by 23rd-year head coach Walter A. Johnson, the Blue Hose compiled an overall record of 6–4, with a mark of 6–1 in conference play.

== Schedule ==
Date	Time	Opponent	Site	Result	Attendance	Source
September 17		at Clemson*	Riggs Field; Clemson, SC	L 0–26		
September 24		at Oglethorpe	Hermance Stadium; North Atlanta, GA	W 9–7		
September 30		Erskine	Bailey Stadium; Clinton, SC	W 15–0	2,500	
October 7		The Citadel*	Bailey Stadium; Clinton, SC	L 0–12		
October 14		Newberry	Bailey Stadium; Clinton, SC (rivalry)	W 7–6		
October 22		at Centre	Farris Stadium; Danville, KY	L 7–26		
October 28		Emory and Henry	Bailey Stadium; Clinton, SC	W 12–0	1,500	
November 5		at Mercer*	Centennial Stadium; Macon, GA	L 0–28		
November 19		Wofford	Bailey Stadium; Clinton, SC	W 13–0	2,000	
November 24	2:30 p.m.	vs. Stetson	Daytona Beach, FL	W 7–6	2,000	
*Non-conference game; All times are in Eastern time
