= 1938 Wofford Terriers football team =

American college football season

1938 Wofford Terriers football
- Conference: Southern Intercollegiate Athletic Association
- Record: 0–8–1 (0–4–1 SIAA)
- Head coach: Jules Carson (5th season)
- Home stadium: Synder Field

1938 Southern Intercollegiate Athletic Association football standings
	Conf.					Overall
Team	W		L		T	W		L		T
West Tennessee State Teachers $	7	–	0	–	0	10	–	0	–	0
Centre	4	–	0	–	0	7	–	2	–	0
Miami (FL)	3	–	0	–	0	8	–	2	–	0
Centenary	2	–	0	–	0	7	–	4	–	0
Mississippi State Teachers	6	–	1	–	0	7	–	2	–	0
Presbyterian	6	–	1	–	0	6	–	4	–	0
Mississippi College	5	–	1	–	0	7	–	2	–	0
Western Kentucky State Teachers	4	–	1	–	0	7	–	2	–	0
SW Louisiana	4	–	1	–	1	8	–	2	–	1
Murray State	4	–	1	–	0	6	–	2	–	1
Tennessee Tech	4	–	1	–	0	6	–	3	–	0
Eastern Kentucky	3	–	1	–	1	6	–	1	–	1
Morehead State	2	–	1	–	1	5	–	1	–	1
Stetson	4	–	2	–	1	6	–	2	–	1
Newberry	4	–	2	–	0	5	–	5	–	0
Rollins	3	–	2	–	1	6	–	2	–	1
Louisiana Normal	3	–	3	–	0	5	–	5	–	0
Georgetown (KY)	2	–	3	–	0	4	–	4	–	0
Union (TN)	2	–	3	–	0	4	–	6	–	0
Louisiana College	2	–	4	–	1	4	–	4	–	1
Union (KY)	1	–	2	–	0	4	–	4	–	0
Transylvania	2	–	4	–	0	3	–	5	–	0
Louisiana Tech	2	–	4	–	0	3	–	7	–	1
Delta State	2	–	5	–	0	2	–	7	–	0
Oglethorpe	2	–	5	–	0	2	–	9	–	0
Middle Tennessee State Teachers	1	–	5	–	0	2	–	6	–	0
Howard (AL)	0	–	2	–	0	2	–	5	–	0
Emory and Henry	0	–	2	–	0	1	–	6	–	2
Louisville	0	–	3	–	0	2	–	6	–	0
Troy State	0	–	3	–	1	3	–	4	–	1
Jacksonville State	0	–	3	–	1	1	–	6	–	1
Erskine	0	–	3	–	1	1	–	7	–	2
Tampa	0	–	4	–	0	3	–	7	–	0
Wofford	0	–	4	–	1	0	–	8	–	1
Millsaps	0	–	7	–	0	1	–	10	–	0
$ – Conference champion

The 1938 Wofford Terriers football team represented the Wofford College as a member the Southern Intercollegiate Athletic Association (SIAA) during the 1938 college football season. Led by fifth-year head coach Jules Carson, the Terriers compiled an overall record of 0–8–1, with a mark of 0–4–1 in conference play.

== Schedule ==
Date	Time	Opponent	Site	Result	Attendance	Source
September 24		at Mercer*	Centennial Stadium; Macon, GA	L 0–15		
October 1		Guilford*	Synder Field; Spartanburg, SC	L 0–6		
October 7		at Oglethorpe	Hermance Stadium; North Atlanta, GA	L 6–19	400	
October 15		Erskine	Synder Field; Spartanburg, SC	T 0–0	3,000	
October 22	3:00 p.m.	Stetson	Synder Field; Spartanburg, SC	L 6–7		
October 29		at The Citadel*	Johnson Hagood Stadium; Charleston, SC (rivalry)	L 0–27		
November 5		at Davidson*	Richardson Field; Davidson, NC	L 0–29		
November 11		at Newberry	Setzler Field; Newberry, SC	L 2–6	1,800	
November 19		at Presbyterian	Bailey Stadium; Clinton, SC	L 0–13	2,000	
*Non-conference game; All times are in Eastern time
