= 1938 Oglethorpe Stormy Petrels football team =

American college football season

1938 Oglethorpe Stormy Petrels football
- Conference: Southern Intercollegiate Athletic Association
- Record: 2–8 (2–5 SIAA)
- Head coach: John W. Patrick (5th season)
- Home stadium: Hermance Stadium

1938 Southern Intercollegiate Athletic Association football standings
	Conf.					Overall
Team	W		L		T	W		L		T
West Tennessee State Teachers $	7	–	0	–	0	10	–	0	–	0
Centre	4	–	0	–	0	7	–	2	–	0
Miami (FL)	3	–	0	–	0	8	–	2	–	0
Centenary	2	–	0	–	0	7	–	4	–	0
Mississippi State Teachers	6	–	1	–	0	7	–	2	–	0
Presbyterian	6	–	1	–	0	6	–	4	–	0
Mississippi College	5	–	1	–	0	7	–	2	–	0
Western Kentucky State Teachers	4	–	1	–	0	7	–	2	–	0
SW Louisiana	4	–	1	–	1	8	–	2	–	1
Murray State	4	–	1	–	0	6	–	2	–	1
Tennessee Tech	4	–	1	–	0	6	–	3	–	0
Eastern Kentucky	3	–	1	–	1	6	–	1	–	1
Morehead State	2	–	1	–	1	5	–	1	–	1
Stetson	4	–	2	–	1	6	–	2	–	1
Newberry	4	–	2	–	0	5	–	5	–	0
Rollins	3	–	2	–	1	6	–	2	–	1
Louisiana Normal	3	–	3	–	0	5	–	5	–	0
Georgetown (KY)	2	–	3	–	0	4	–	4	–	0
Union (TN)	2	–	3	–	0	4	–	6	–	0
Louisiana College	2	–	4	–	1	4	–	4	–	1
Union (KY)	1	–	2	–	0	4	–	4	–	0
Transylvania	2	–	4	–	0	3	–	5	–	0
Louisiana Tech	2	–	4	–	0	3	–	7	–	1
Delta State	2	–	5	–	0	2	–	7	–	0
Oglethorpe	2	–	5	–	0	2	–	9	–	0
Middle Tennessee State Teachers	1	–	5	–	0	2	–	6	–	0
Howard (AL)	0	–	2	–	0	2	–	5	–	0
Emory and Henry	0	–	2	–	0	1	–	6	–	2
Louisville	0	–	3	–	0	2	–	6	–	0
Troy State	0	–	3	–	1	3	–	4	–	1
Jacksonville State	0	–	3	–	1	1	–	6	–	1
Erskine	0	–	3	–	1	1	–	7	–	2
Tampa	0	–	4	–	0	3	–	7	–	0
Wofford	0	–	4	–	1	0	–	8	–	1
Millsaps	0	–	7	–	0	1	–	10	–	0
$ – Conference champion

The 1938 Oglethorpe Stormy Petrels football team was an American football team that represented Oglethorpe University as a member of the Southern Intercollegiate Athletic Association (SIAA) during the 1938 college football season. In their fifth year under head coach John W. Patrick, the Stormy Petrels compiled an overall record of 2–8 with a mark of 2–5 in conference play, tying for 24th place in the SIAA. The team played home games at Hermance Stadium in North Atlanta, Georgia.

== Schedule ==
Date	Time	Opponent	Site	Result	Attendance	Source
September 16		at Furman*	Sirrine Stadium; Greenville, SC	L 6–13	7,500	
September 24		Presbyterian	Hermance Stadium; North Atlanta, GA	L 7–9		
October 1		at Kentucky*	Stoll Field; Lexington, KY	L 0–66	7,000	
October 7		Wofford	Hermance Stadium; North Atlanta, GA	W 19–6	400	
October 15		Rollins^{†}	Hermance Stadium; North Atlanta, GA	W 19–12		
October 22		at Mississippi College	Provine Field; Clinton, MS	L 6–33		
November 4		at Miami (FL)	Burdine Stadium; Miami, FL	L 0–44	13,612	
November 11		at The Citadel*	Johnson Hagood Stadium; Charleston, SC	L 8–26	4,000	
November 19	3:00 p.m.	at Stetson	Hulley Field; DeLand, FL	L 7–13		
November 24		at Newberry	Setzler Field; Newberry, SC	L 0–20	1,600	
*Non-conference game; ^{†}Homecoming; All times are in Eastern time
