= Fred DeLay =

American sports coach and administrator (1901–1969)

Biographical details
- Born: January 17, 1901; Lascassas, Tennessee, U.S.
- Died: September 25, 1969 (aged 68); Nashville, Tennessee, U.S.

Playing career

Football
- c. 1920: Middle Tennessee

Baseball
- c. 1920: Middle Tennessee

Coaching career (HC unless noted)

Football
- 1931–1936: Carthage HS (TN)
- 1937–1942: Union (TN)
- 1948: Union (TN)

Basketball
- 1931–1937: Carthage HS (TN)
- 1937–?: Union (TN)

Administrative career (AD unless noted)
- 1937–1945: Union (TN)
- 1948–1949: Union (TN)

Head coaching record
- Overall: 33–31–2

William Fred DeLay (January 17, 1901 – September 25, 1969) was an American football and basketball coach and college athletics administrator. He served as the head football coach at Union University in Jackson, Tennessee from 1937 to 1942 and again in 1948. DeLay was also the athletic director at Union from 1937 to 1945 and 1948 to 1949.

DeLay was born and raised in Lascassas, Tennessee. He played college football and college baseball at Middle Tennessee State Normal School—now known as Middle Tennessee State University and earned a master's degree at Peabody College. He died at the age of 68, on September 25, 1969, at Parkview Hospital in Nashville, Tennessee.

== Head coaching record ==
=== Football ===
Year	Team	Overall	Conference	Standing	Bowl/playoffs
Union (Tennessee) Bulldogs (Southern Intercollegiate Athletic Association) (1937–1941)
1937	Union (Tennessee)	1–8–1	0–5–1	30th	
1938	Union (Tennessee)	4–6	2–3	T–18th	
1939	Union (Tennessee)	7–2	3–2	T–12th	
1940	Union (Tennessee)	6–3	3–1	8th	
1941	Union (Tennessee)	5–3–1	3–1–1	T–6th	
Union (Tennessee) Bulldogs (Independent) (1942)
1942	Union (Tennessee)	7–2			
Union (Tennessee) Bulldogs (Independent) (1948)
1948	Union (Tennessee)	3–7			
Union (Tennessee):		33–31–2	11–12–2		
Total:		33–31–2			
