= Battle of the Bluegrass =

American college football rivalry

- Eastern Kentucky Colonels Western Kentucky Hilltoppers
- Sport: Football
- First meeting: October 23, 1914; Eastern Kentucky, 34–6
- Latest meeting: September 7, 2024; Western Kentucky, 31–0
- Trophy: None

Statistics
- Total meetings: 86
- All-time series: Western Kentucky leads, 48–35–3
- Largest victory: Western Kentucky, 50–0 (1930)
- Longest win streak: Western Kentucky, 13 (1921–1941)
- Current win streak: Western Kentucky, 4 (2007–present)

Locations of EKU and WKU

The Battle of the Bluegrass is the name given to the Eastern Kentucky–Western Kentucky football rivalry. Both schools were formerly members of the Ohio Valley Conference, and played against each other regularly until Western Kentucky's transition from the NCAA's FCS to FBS in 2008. The two teams have met 86 times on the football field, with Western Kentucky currently holding a 48–35–3 edge in the all-time series. The series resumed again in 2017, when Western Kentucky hosted Eastern Kentucky in a game played at Houchens Industries–L. T. Smith Stadium. The two teams met again on September 7, 2024.

== Game results ==
Eastern Kentucky victories	Western Kentucky victories	Tie games

No.	Date	Location	Winner	Score
1	October 23, 1914	Richmond, KY	Eastern Kentucky	34–6
2	November 26, 1914	Bowling Green, KY	Western Kentucky	18–0
3	November 1, 1915	Richmond, KY	Tie	0–0
4	November 15, 1915	Bowling Green, KY	Eastern Kentucky	6–0
5	November 4, 1916	Richmond, KY	Eastern Kentucky	13–12
6	November 30, 1916	Bowling Green, KY	Eastern Kentucky	16–0
7	November 5, 1921	Bowling Green, KY	Western Kentucky	21–0
8	November 10, 1922	Richmond, KY	Western Kentucky	47–6
9	November 24, 1927	Bowling Green, KY	Western Kentucky	12–0
10	November 28, 1929	Bowling Green, KY	Western Kentucky	36–0
11	November 22, 1930	Richmond, KY	Western Kentucky	50–0
12	November 21, 1931	Bowling Green, KY	Western Kentucky	42–7
13	November 10, 1934	Richmond, KY	Western Kentucky	47–9
14	November 23, 1935	Bowling Green, KY	Western Kentucky	40–6
15	November 14, 1936	Richmond, KY	Western Kentucky	7–0
16	November 6, 1937	Bowling Green, KY	Western Kentucky	23–0
17	November 5, 1938	Richmond, KY	Western Kentucky	32–7
18	November 11, 1939	Bowling Green, KY	Western Kentucky	26–0
19	October 25, 1941	Bowling Green, KY	Western Kentucky	27–20
20	October 31, 1942	Richmond, KY	Eastern Kentucky	18–0
21	November 16, 1946	Bowling Green, KY	Eastern Kentucky	6–0
22	November 15, 1947	Richmond, KY	Eastern Kentucky	27–7
23	November 13, 1948	Bowling Green, KY	Western Kentucky	14–13
24	November 12, 1949	Richmond, KY	Eastern Kentucky	20–7
25	November 11, 1950	Bowling Green, KY	Western Kentucky	14–13
26	November 10, 1951	Richmond, KY	Eastern Kentucky	31–7
27	November 8, 1952	Bowling Green, KY	Western Kentucky	48–6
28	November 7, 1953	Richmond, KY	Eastern Kentucky	13–7
29	November 6, 1954	Bowling Green, KY	Eastern Kentucky	21–0
30	November 5, 1955	Richmond, KY	Eastern Kentucky	7–0
31	October 20, 1956	Bowling Green, KY	Western Kentucky	14–6
32	November 2, 1957	Richmond, KY	Eastern Kentucky	28–0
33	November 1, 1958	Bowling Green, KY	Western Kentucky	21–14
34	October 31, 1959	Richmond, KY	Western Kentucky	14–7
35	October 29, 1960	Bowling Green, KY	Eastern Kentucky	17–7
36	October 28, 1961	Richmond, KY	Western Kentucky	16–15
37	October 27, 1962	Bowling Green, KY	Eastern Kentucky	6–5
38	November 2, 1963	Richmond, KY	Western Kentucky	29–6
39	October 31, 1964	Bowling Green, KY	Western Kentucky	24–0
40	October 30, 1965	Richmond, KY	Eastern Kentucky	28–12
41	October 29, 1966	Bowling Green, KY	Eastern Kentucky	24–12
42	October 21, 1967	Richmond, KY	Tie	14–14
43	October 26, 1968	Bowling Green, KY	Eastern Kentucky	16–7
44	October 25, 1969	Richmond, KY	Western Kentucky	27–26

No.	Date	Location	Winner	Score
45	October 24, 1970	Bowling Green, KY	Western Kentucky	19–7
46	October 23, 1971	Richmond, KY	Western Kentucky	16–7
47	October 21, 1972	Bowling Green, KY	Western Kentucky	10–0
48	October 20, 1973	Richmond, KY	Western Kentucky	35–0
49	October 26, 1974	Bowling Green, KY	Western Kentucky	34–24
50	October 25, 1975	Richmond, KY	Eastern Kentucky	13–7
51	October 23, 1976	Bowling Green, KY	Western Kentucky	10–6
52	October 22, 1977	Richmond, KY	Eastern Kentucky	35–10
53	October 21, 1978	Bowling Green, KY	Western Kentucky	17–16
54	October 20, 1979	Richmond, KY	Eastern Kentucky	8–6
55	October 25, 1980	Bowling Green, KY	Western Kentucky	13–10
56	October 24, 1981	Richmond, KY	Eastern Kentucky	19–11
57	October 23, 1982	Bowling Green, KY	Eastern Kentucky	35–21
58	October 22, 1983	Richmond, KY	Tie	10–10
59	October 20, 1984	Bowling Green, KY	Western Kentucky	17–10
60	October 26, 1985	Richmond, KY	Eastern Kentucky	51–21
61	October 4, 1986	Bowling Green, KY	Western Kentucky	24–10
62	October 3, 1987	Richmond, KY	Eastern Kentucky	20–10
63	November 28, 1987 †	Richmond, KY	Eastern Kentucky	40–17
64	September 24, 1988	Bowling Green, KY	Western Kentucky	16–14
65	December 3, 1988 †	Richmond, KY	Eastern Kentucky	41–24
66	September 23, 1989	Richmond, KY	Eastern Kentucky	24–3
67	September 29, 1990	Bowling Green, KY	Eastern Kentucky	35–12
68	October 12, 1991	Richmond, KY	Eastern Kentucky	37–22
69	September 5, 1992	Bowling Green, KY	Eastern Kentucky	21–7
70	September 2, 1993	Richmond, KY	Western Kentucky	15–10
71	September 1, 1994	Bowling Green, KY	Western Kentucky	24–21
72	September 9, 1995	Richmond, KY	Eastern Kentucky	38–14
73	September 14, 1996	Bowling Green, KY	Western Kentucky	14–7
74	September 13, 1997	Richmond, KY	Western Kentucky	37–21
75	November 29, 1997 †	Bowling Green, KY	Western Kentucky	42–14
76	September 19, 1998	Bowling Green, KY	Eastern Kentucky	27–16
77	October 9, 1999	Richmond, KY	Eastern Kentucky	30–10
78	October 7, 2000	Bowling Green, KY	Western Kentucky	6–3
79	September 20, 2003	Bowling Green, KY	Western Kentucky	36–3
80	September 18, 2004	Richmond, KY	Western Kentucky	21–8
81	September 10, 2005	Bowling Green, KY	Western Kentucky	23–21
82	September 9, 2006	Richmond, KY	Eastern Kentucky	26–21
83	September 15, 2007	Bowling Green, KY	Western Kentucky	26–6
84	September 6, 2008	Richmond, KY	Western Kentucky	37–13
85	September 2, 2017	Bowling Green, KY	Western Kentucky	31–17
86	September 7, 2024	Bowling Green, KY	Western Kentucky	31–0
Series: Western Kentucky leads 48–35–3
† = FCS postseason game

== See also ==
- List of NCAA college football rivalry games
