= Stetson Hatters football, 1930–1939 =

American college football seasons

1930–1939 Stetson Hatters football
- Conference: SIAA (1930–1931, 1933–1939); Independent (1932)
- Head coach: Herb McQuillan (1930–1934); Brady Cowell (1935–1939)
- Home stadium: Hulley Field

The Stetson Hatters football program, 1930–1939 represented John B. Stetson University—now known as Stetson University—during the 1930s in college football as a member of the Southern Intercollegiate Athletic Association (SIAA). The team was led by two different head coaches: Herb McQuillan who held the position from 1924 to 1934 and Brady Cowell who held the position from 1935 to 1940. During the 1930s, the Hatters compiled a 38–34–7 record and recorded six winning seasons in ten years of competition. Highlights of the decade include:

- The 1935 Stetson Hatters football team compiled an 8–2 season, a still-standing record of wins in a season (as of the end of the 2024 season).

The team played its home games at Hulley Field in DeLand, Florida.

== Decade overview ==
Year	Head coach	Overall record	Conf. record	Conf. rank	Points scored	Points allowed	Delta
1930	Herb McQuillan	5–3	3–3	T–13th	187	55	+132
1931	Herb McQuillan	3–5	1–5	T–27th	85	106	-21
1932	Herb McQuillan	3–1–1	0–0	N/A	39	41	-2
1933	Herb McQuillan	3–3–1	0–0–1	T–29th	112	49	+63
1934	Herb McQuillan	1–4–1	0–2	29th	34	100	-66
1935	Brady Cowell	8–2	4–1	T–9th	103	134	-31
1936	Brady Cowell	2–5–1	0–3–1	T–27th	44	97	-53
1937	Brady Cowell	5–4	2–3	T–16th	117	103	+14
1938	Brady Cowell	6–2–1	4–2–1	T–13th	151	72	+79
1939	Brady Cowell	3–5–2	2–4–2	24th	96	141	-45
Total		38–34–7	16–23–5		968	898	+70

== 1931 ==
1931 Stetson Hatters football
- Conference: Southern Intercollegiate Athletic Association
- Record: 3–5 (1–5 SIAA)
- Head coach: Herb McQuillan (8th season)
- Captain: Mosley
- Home stadium: Hulley Field

The 1931 Stetson Hatters football team represented John B. Stetson University—now known as Stetson University—as a member of the Southern Intercollegiate Athletic Association (SIAA) during the 1931 college football season. In their eighth year under head coach Herb McQuillan, the Hatters compiled a 3–5 record (1–5 in conference) and were outscored by opponents by a total of 106 to 85.

During the team's 19–7 loss to Millsaps on November 11, Millsaps junior tackle Commie Dandevenor "C. T." Smith, who was a Florida native, suffered a broken vertebrae in his neck during a play in the second quarter. He was taken off the field on a stretcher and taken to a nearby hospital in DeLand, Florida. He eventually lost consciousness right after midnight. On November 13, two days after the game, Smith died from his injuries. Stetson coach McQuillan issued a statement to the Stetson student body expressing his sorrow over the tragedy. According to a survey, Smith was one of at least 11 football players who had died of injuries sustained in a game since October 1 of that year.

=== Schedule ===
Date	Opponent	Site	Result	Attendance	Source
October 3	at Mercer	Centennial Stadium; Macon, GA	L 7–28	2,000	
October 10	vs. Birmingham–Southern	Wiregrass Stadium; Dothan, AL	L 0–19		
October 17	at Centenary	Fairgrounds Stadium; Shreveport, LA	L 0–27	2,000	
October 24	at The Citadel	Johnson Hagood Stadium; Charleston, SC	L 0–6		
November 7	Erskine^{†}	Hulley Field; DeLand, FL	W 24–7	2,000+	
November 11	Millsaps	Hulley Field; DeLand, FL	L 7–19		
November 21	at Southern College*	Lakeland, FL	W 20–0		
	South Georgia*		W 27–0		
*Non-conference game; ^{†}Homecoming

== 1932 ==
1932 Stetson Hatters football
- Conference: Independent
- Record: 3–1–1
- Head coach: Herb McQuillan (9th season)
- Home stadium: Hulley Field

The 1932 Stetson Hatters freshmen football team represented John B. Stetson University—now known as Stetson University—as an independent during the 1932 college football season. In their ninth year under head coach Herb McQuillan, the Hatters compiled a 3–1–1 record and were outscored by opponents by a total of 41 to 39.

Prior to the season, coach McQuillan announced that due to budget constraints the team would not field a varsity team and only have a freshmen team.

=== Schedule ===
Date	Opponent	Site	Result	Source
October 7	Middle Georgia	Hulley Field; DeLand, FL	T 0–0	
October 15	at Georgia State College For Men	Tifton, GA	L 6–34	
October 29	Oglethorpe freshmen^{†}	Hulley Field; DeLand, FL	W 13–0	
November 3	vs. Florida All-Stars	Lakeland, FL	W 7–0	
November 11	Parris Island Marines	Hulley Field; DeLand, FL	W 7–0	
^{†}Homecoming

== 1933 ==
1933 Stetson Hatters football
- Conference: Southern Intercollegiate Athletic Association
- Record: 3–3–1 (0–0–1 SIAA)
- Head coach: Herb McQuillan (10th season)
- Home stadium: Hulley Field

The 1933 Stetson Hatters football team represented John B. Stetson University—now known as Stetson University—as a member of the Southern Intercollegiate Athletic Association (SIAA) during the 1933 college football season. In their 10th year under head coach Herb McQuillan, the Hatters compiled a 3–3–1 record (0–0–1 in conference) and outscored opponents by a total of 112 to 49.

=== Schedule ===
Date	Opponent	Site	Result	Attendance	Source
September 30	at Florida*	Florida Field; Gainesville, FL	L 0–28	6,000	
October 6	Middle Georgia*	Hulley Field; DeLand, FL	W 7–6		
October 19	at Oglethorpe*	Ponce de Leon Park; Atlanta, GA	L 6–13	2,000	
October 31	Bowden*	Hulley Field; DeLand, FL	W 26–0		
November 11	Southern College^{†}*	Hulley Field; DeLand, FL	W 73–0	2,200	
November 25	at Tampa*	Plant Field; Tampa, FL	L 0–8		
December 3	at Miami (FL)	Moore Park; Miami, FL	T 0–0		
*Non-conference game; ^{†}Homecoming

== 1934 ==
1934 Stetson Hatters football
- Conference: Southern Intercollegiate Athletic Association
- Record: 2–4–1 (0–2–1 SIAA)
- Head coach: Herb McQuillan (11th season)
- Home stadium: Hulley Field

The 1934 Stetson Hatters football team represented John B. Stetson University—now known as Stetson University—as a member of the Southern Intercollegiate Athletic Association (SIAA) during the 1934 college football season. In their 11th year under head coach Herb McQuillan, the Hatters compiled a 1–4–1 record (0–2–1 in conference) and were outscored by opponents by a total of 100 to 53.

=== Schedule ===
Date	Time	Opponent	Site	Result	Attendance	Source
September 29		at Georgia*	Sanford Stadium; Athens, GA	L 0–48	5,000	
October 5		at Murray State	Murray, KY	L 7–19		
October 19		South Georgia Teachers	DeLand, FL	W 19–0		
October 27		vs. Mercer	Fairfield Stadium; Jacksonville, FL	L 0–6		
November 2		at Miami (FL)	Moore Park; Miami, FL	T 6–6		
November 17		Tampa*^{†}	Hulley Field; DeLand, FL	W 19–6		
December 1		at Florida*	Florida Field; Gainesville, FL	L 0–14		
*Non-conference game; ^{†}Homecoming

== 1935 ==
1935 Stetson Hatters football
- Conference: Southern Intercollegiate Athletic Association
- Record: 8–2 (4–1 SIAA)
- Head coach: Brady Cowell (1st season)
- Home stadium: Hulley Field

The 1935 Stetson Hatters football team represented John B. Stetson University—now known as Stetson University—as a member of the Southern Intercollegiate Athletic Association (SIAA) during the 1935 college football season. In their first year under head coach Brady Cowell, the Hatters compiled an 8–2 record (4–1 in conference) and were outscored by opponents by a total of 134 to 103.

Prior to the season, 11th-year head coach Herb McQuillan resigned to accept an assistant position with Texas A&M. Initially, former professional star Red Grange was in the running to be the next head coach. The Stetson Alumni Association recommended that the school hire him as well. While the association's recommendation was not binding, it was believed to hold weight on the president's decision on who to hire. The president quickly refused, stating that he had six men in mind and that Grange was not one of them. Instead, the school opted to hire Florida assistant Brady Cowell.

=== Schedule ===
Date	Time	Opponent	Site	Result	Attendance	Source
September 28		at Florida*	Florida Field; Gainesville, FL	L 0–34	5,000	
October 12		at Oglethorpe*	Hermance Stadium; North Atlanta, GA	W 7–6		
October 18		vs. Howard (AL)	Wiregrass Stadium; Dothan, AL	L 0–32	3,000	
November 1	8:00 p.m.	at Miami (FL)	Miami Stadium; Miami, FL	W 13–12	4,000	
November 8	8:00 p.m.	Erskine	Hulley Field; DeLand, FL	W 19–13		
November 15	8:00 p.m.	at Tampa*	Plant Field; Tampa, FL	W 9–7	5,000	
November 23		Murray State^{†}	Hulley Field; DeLand, FL	W 6–0		
November 28		at South Georgia Teachers*	Statesboro, GA	W 9–6		
December 6		Rollins	Hulley Field; DeLand, FL	W 21–14		
		Southern College*		W 19–10		
*Non-conference game; ^{†}Homecoming; All times are in Eastern time

== 1936 ==
1936 Stetson Hatters football
- Conference: Southern Intercollegiate Athletic Association
- Record: 2–5–1 (0–3–1 SIAA)
- Head coach: Brady Cowell (2nd season)
- Home stadium: Hulley Field

The 1936 Stetson Hatters football team represented John B. Stetson University—now known as Stetson University—as a member of the Southern Intercollegiate Athletic Association (SIAA) during the 1936 college football season. In their second year under head coach Brady Cowell, the Hatters compiled a 2–5–1 record (0–3–1 in conference) and were outscored by opponents by a total of 97 to 44.

=== Schedule ===
Date	Time	Opponent	Site	Result	Attendance	Source
October 9	8:00 p.m.	South Georgia Teachers*	Hulley Field; DeLand, FL	W 12–0		
October 17		at Florida*	Florida Field; Gainesville, FL	L 0–32		
October 23	8:15 p.m.	at Tampa*	Plant Field; Tampa, FL	L 0–6	8,000	
October 30	8:00 p.m.	Erskine	Hulley Field; DeLand, FL	L 6–12		
November 6	8:00 p.m.	at Miami (FL)	Miami Stadium; Miami, FL	L 6–20	5,000	
November 14	2:30 p.m.	Union (TN)^{†}	Hulley Field; DeLand, FL	T 7–7		
November 26	2:30 p.m.	Oglethorpe*	Hulley Field; DeLand, FL	W 13–7		
December 4		at Rollins	Greater Orlando Stadium; Orlando, FL	L 0–13	3,500	
*Non-conference game; ^{†}Homecoming; All times are in Eastern time

== 1937 ==
1937 Stetson Hatters football
- Conference: Southern Intercollegiate Athletic Association
- Record: 5–4 (2–3 SIAA)
- Head coach: Brady Cowell (3rd season)
- Home stadium: Hulley Field

The 1937 Stetson Hatters football team represented John B. Stetson University—now known as Stetson University—as a member of the Southern Intercollegiate Athletic Association (SIAA) during the 1937 college football season. In their third year under head coach Brady Cowell, the Hatters compiled a 5–4 record (2–3 in conference) and outscored opponents by a total of 117 to 103.

=== Schedule ===
Date	Time	Opponent	Site	Result	Attendance	Source
October 2		at Florida*	Florida Field; Gainesville, FL	L 0–18	4,000	
October 8	8:00 p.m.	South Georgia Teachers*	Hulley Field; DeLand, FL	W 24–0		
October 15	8:15 p.m.	at Tampa*	Phillips Field; Tampa, FL	W 18–12	5,000	
October 29		Erskine	Hulley Field; DeLand, FL	L 13–14	2,000	
November 5	8:15 p.m.	at Miami (FL)	Burdine Stadium; Miami, FL	L 13–25	9,343	
November 13	3:00 p.m.	Lenoir Rhyne*^{†}	Hulley Field; DeLand, FL	W 20–6		
November 20		at Oglethorpe	Hermance Stadium; North Atlanta, GA	L 0–10		
November 25		Mississippi College	Hulley Field; DeLand, FL	W 14–6		
December 3	8:15 p.m.	at Rollins	Tinker Field; Orlando, FL	W 15–12		
*Non-conference game; ^{†}Homecoming; All times are in Eastern time

== 1938 ==
1938 Stetson Hatters football
- Conference: Southern Intercollegiate Athletic Association
- Record: 6–2–1 (4–2–1 SIAA)
- Head coach: Brady Cowell (4th season)
- Home stadium: Hulley Field

The 1938 Stetson Hatters football team represented John B. Stetson University—now known as Stetson University—as a member of the Southern Intercollegiate Athletic Association (SIAA) during the 1938 college football season. In their fourth year under head coach Brady Cowell, the Hatters compiled a 6–2–1 record (4–2–1 in conference) and outscored opponents by a total of 151 to 72.

=== Schedule ===
Date	Time	Opponent	Site	Result	Attendance	Source
September 24	8:15 p.m.	at Florida*	Florida Field; Gainesville, FL	W 16–14	8,000	
September 30	8:00 p.m.	Rollins	Hulley Field; DeLand, FL	L 0–18	4,000	
October 7	8:00 p.m.	South Georgia Teachers*	Hulley Field; DeLand, FL	W 28–0		
October 22	3:00 p.m.	at Wofford	Synder Field; Spartanburg, SC	W 7–6		
October 28	8:00 p.m.	Erskine	Hulley Field; DeLand, FL	W 33–14		
November 11	2:30 p.m.	at Tampa	Phillips Field; Tampa, FL	W 42–0	3,000	
November 19	3:00 p.m.	Oglethorpe^{†}	Hulley Field; DeLand, FL	W 13–7		
November 24	2:30 p.m.	vs. Presbyterian	Daytona Beach, FL	L 6–7	2,000	
December 2	8:15 p.m.	at Rollins	Greater Orlando Stadium; Orlando, FL	T 6–6	4,000	
*Non-conference game; ^{†}Homecoming; All times are in Eastern time

== 1939 ==
1939 Stetson Hatters football
- Conference: Southern Intercollegiate Athletic Association
- Record: 3–5–2 (2–4–2 SIAA)
- Head coach: Brady Cowell (5th season)
- Home stadium: Hulley Field

The 1939 Stetson Hatters football team represented John B. Stetson University—now known as Stetson University—as a member of the Southern Intercollegiate Athletic Association (SIAA) during the 1939 college football season. In their fourth year under head coach Brady Cowell, the Hatters compiled a 3–5–2 record (2–4–2 in conference) and were outscored by opponents by a total of 141 to 96.

=== Schedule ===
Date	Time	Opponent	Site	Result	Attendance	Source
September 23	8:00 p.m.	at Florida*	Florida Field; Gainesville, FL	L 0–21	5,000	
September 29		Georgia Teachers*	Hulley Field; DeLand, FL	W 19–0		
October 6	8:00 p.m.	Rollins	Hulley Field; DeLand, FL	L 7–27	2,000	
October 20	8:00 p.m.	at Presbyterian	Clinton, SC	T 12–12		
October 27	8:00 p.m.	Erskine	Hulley Field; DeLand, FL	W 14–7	1,500	
November 3	8:00 p.m.	at Tampa	Phillips Field; Tampa, FL	T 0–0	3,500	
November 11	3:00 p.m.	Newberry^{†}	Hulley Field; DeLand, FL	L 0–20	2,000	
November 18	2:15 p.m.	at Oglethorpe	Hermance Stadium; North Atlanta, GA	L 13–20	2,000	
November 24	8:00 p.m.	vs.Wofford	Volusia Field; Daytona, Beach FL	W 14–7		
December 1	8:15 p.m.	at Rollins	Greater Orlando Stadium; Orlando, FL	L 17–27	3,000	
*Non-conference game; ^{†}Homecoming; All times are in Eastern time
