= Union Commonwealth Bulldogs football =

- First season: 1905; 121 years ago (Note: The team was discontinued and restarted several times. They launched the current football program in 1984; 42 years ago.)
- Athletic director: Clay Butler
- Head coach: Boston Bryant; 1st season, 3–6 (.333)
- Location: Barbourville, Kentucky
- Stadium: Williamson Stadium at Burch/Nau Field
- Conference: Appalachian Athletic Conference
- Colors: Orange and black

Conference championships
- 1992
- Outfitter: Nike
- Website: gounionbulldogs.com

The Union Commonwealth Bulldogs football program represents Union Commonwealth University of Barbourville, Kentucky in college football. They are football-only members of the Mid-South Conference and compete at the National Association of Intercollegiate Athletics (NAIA) level. The team's head coach is Boston Bryant.

== History ==
The program dates back to 1905, when it played three games against Williamsburg Institute. After the 1905 season, the program did not field a team for the next 16 years from 1906 to 1921. The program resumed in 1922 and experienced a period of significant success during a 13-year period under coach J. R. Bacon from 1929 to 1941, including a 5–0–2 season in 1934. Union beat the Louisville Cardinals in the first four meetings between the two programs from 1932 to 1935, before losing in 1936.

The program was shut down in 1942 due to the lack of players during World War II. The Union football program did not restart again until 1984. Since football was resumed, the program has had little success, experiencing a 25-game losing streak that ran from 1998 to 2000. The program did win one Mid-South Conference co-championship in 1992 and played one game (a loss) in the NAIA championship series in 2008.
