= Rollins Tars football =

American college football team (1904–1949)

- First season: 1904
- Last season: 1949; 77 years ago
- Location: Winter Park, Florida

Conference championships
- 1 SIAA
- Colors: Blue, White, and Yellow

The Rollins Tars football team represented Rollins College in the sport of college football. They first completed in 1904, and last competed in 1949.

== History ==
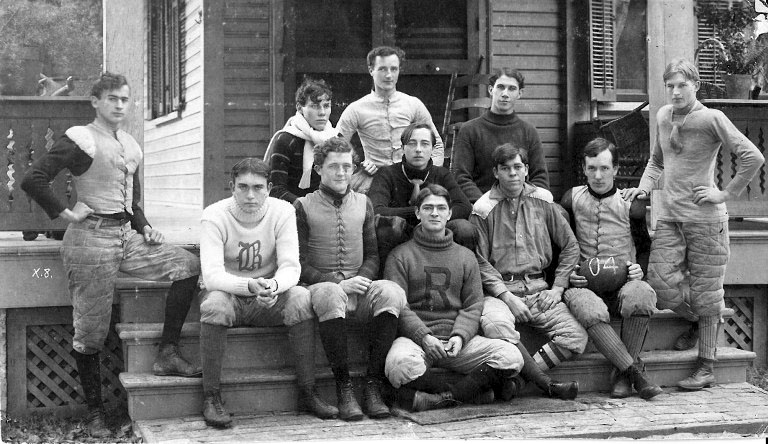
Rollins team of 1904

Rollins fielded its first football team in 1904.

The 1908 team claims a state championship, and the 1940 team won the Southern Intercollegiate Athletic Association title. Jack McDowall was a prominent athletic director.

=== 1947 homecoming controversy ===
During the 1947 college football season, Rollins was scheduled to have their homecoming game on November 28 at Orlando Stadium against Ohio Wesleyan (OWU). OWU's team included an African American player, Kenneth Woodward. In this era, there was concern that "a black player on the field would create a firestorm in the Deep South." Trustees at OWU— including Branch Rickey, who played a key role in breaking the baseball color line by signing Jackie Robinson—supported Woodward playing the game. However, the Rollins board of trustees wanted to cancel the game, which was the action taken following a vote of the Rollins student council on November 24. Contemporary newspapers reported that Rollins had "no objections whatsoever" to playing the game, but had canceled the game after "consulting leading white and negro residents" in their area. In addressing students and faculty, Rollins president Hamilton Holt stated:

May I say this to you students; you will probably have critical decisions like this to make as you go through life—decisions that whatever you do, you will be misinterpreted, misunderstood, and reviled….It seemed to all of us that our loyalties to Rollins and its ideals were not to precipitate a crisis that might and probably would promote bad race relations, but to work quietly for better race relations, hoping and believing that time would be on our side.

Two years later, the 1949 Sun Bowl controversy saw Lafayette College of Pennsylvania decline an invitation to a bowl game in El Paso, Texas, when an African American player on their team would not have been allowed to play.
