= List of Mercer Bears football seasons =

This is a list of seasons completed by the Mercer Bears football team. The Bears compete in the Southern Conference (SoCon) of the NCAA Division I Football Championship Subdivision (FCS). Mercer fielded their first football team in 1892 and competed intermittently until 1941. The program was revived in 2013, and Mercer spent their first season competing in the Pioneer Football League before transitioning to the SoCon in 2014. Since 2026, the team has been led by coach Joel Taylor.

== Seasons ==
Legend

Conference champions
Playoff berth
Bowl game berth

List of Mercer Bears football seasons
Season	Team	Head coach	Conference	Regular season results							Postseason results	Final ranking	
Season	Team	Head coach	Conference	Overall			Conference				Playoff result / bowl game	TSN/STATS Poll	Coaches' Poll
Season	Team	Head coach	Conference	Win	Loss	Tie	Win	Loss	Tie	Finish	Playoff result / bowl game	TSN/STATS Poll	Coaches' Poll
Mercer Bears
1892	1892	Dave Beggs	Independent	1	2	0				—	—	—	—
1893	1893	George Stallings	Independent	0	1	0				—	—	—	—
1894	1894	No coach	Independent	No team									
1895	1895	No coach	Independent	No team									
1896	1896	D. J. Winston	SIAA	0	2	1	0	2	1	—	—	—	—
1897	1897	Gordon Saussy	SIAA	0	1	0	0	1	0	—	—	—	—
1903	1903	No coach	SIAA	0	1	0	0	1	0	—	—	—	—
1904	1904	No coach	SIAA	No team									
1905	1905	No coach	SIAA	No team									
1906	1906	E. E. Tarr	SIAA	2	3	0	0	2	0	—	—	—	—
1907	1907	H. R. Schenker	SIAA	3	3	0	0	3	0	—	—	—	—
1908	1908	Frank Blake	SIAA	3	4	0	0	3	0	—	—	—	—
1909	1909	Frank Blake	SIAA	3	4	0	0	4	0	—	—	—	—
1910	1910	C. C. Stroud	SIAA	6	3	0	3	2	0	—	—	—	—
1911	1911	C. C. Stroud	SIAA	4	6	1	2	5	0	—	—	—	—
1912	1912	C. C. Stroud	SIAA	5	3	1	2	3	1	—	—	—	—
1913	1913	Lewie Hardage	SIAA	2	5	1	0	4	1	—	—	—	—
1914	1914	Fred Robins	SIAA	5	4	0	1	3	0	—	—	—	—
1915	1915	Jake Zellars	SIAA	5	4	0	2	3	0	—	—	—	—
1916	1916	Jake Zellars; D. R. Peacock	SIAA	1	6	0	0	4	0	—	—	—	—
1917	1917	No coach	SIAA	No team due to World War I									
1918	1918	No coach	SIAA	No team due to World War I									
1919	1919	Maxwell James	SIAA	0	2	0	0	1	0	—	—	—	—
1920	1920	Josh Cody	SIAA	2	7	0	0	1	0	—	—	—	—
1921	1921	Josh Cody	SIAA	3	6	0	0	3	0	—	—	—	—
1922	1922	Josh Cody	SIAA	5	6	0	0	2	0	—	—	—	—
1923	1923	Stanley Robinson	SIAA	4	5	0	2	2	0	—	—	—	—
1924	1924	Stanley Robinson	SIAA	5	3	2	4	1	1	—	—	—	—
1925	1925	Stanley Robinson	SIAA	3	6	0	3	2	0	—	—	—	—
1926	1926	Bernie Moore	SIAA	4	4	2	2	1	1	—	—	—	—
1927	1927	Bernie Moore	SIAA	5	4	0	2	2	0	—	—	—	—
1928	1928	Bernie Moore	SIAA	3	5	1	2	2	0	—	—	—	—
1929	1929	Lake Russell	SIAA	2	7	0	2	3	0	—	—	—	—
1930	1930	Lake Russell	SIAA	5	5	0	2	2	0	—	—	—	—
1931	1931	Lake Russell	Dixie	7	2	1	1	2	0	—	—	—	—
1932	1932	Lake Russell	Dixie	7	2	0	3	0	0	—	—	—	—
1933	1933	Lake Russell	Dixie	4	3	2	2	0	1	—	—	—	—
1934	1934	Lake Russell	Dixie	3	6	1	0	3	1	—	—	—	—
1935	1935	Lake Russell	Dixie	4	5	0	1	1	0	—	—	—	—
1936	1936	Lake Russell	Dixie	3	6	1	0	2	1	—	—	—	—
1937	1937	Lake Russell	Dixie	4	5	0	0	3	0	—	—	—	—
1938	1938	Lake Russell	Dixie	3	6	0	0	2	0	—	—	—	—
1939	1939	Lake Russell	Dixie	3	7	0	1	2	0	—	—	—	—
1940	1940	Lake Russell	Dixie	1	7	0	0	2	0	—	—	—	—
1941	1941	Bobby Hooks	Dixie	3	6	0	0	2	0	—	—	—	—
Mercer Bears
2013	2013	Bobby Lamb	Pioneer	10	2		6	2		3rd	—	—	—
2014	2014	Bobby Lamb	Southern	6	6		1	6		T–7th	—	—	—
2015	2015	Bobby Lamb	Southern	5	6		2	5		T–6th	—	—	—
2016	2016	Bobby Lamb	Southern	6	5		4	4		5th	—	—	—
2017	2017	Bobby Lamb	Southern	5	6		4	4		5th	—	—	—
2018	2018	Bobby Lamb	Southern	5	6		4	4		T–5th	—	—	—
2019	2019	Bobby Lamb	Southern	4	8		3	5		7th	—	—	—
2020	2020	Drew Cronic	Southern	5	6		5	3		4th	—	—	—
2021	2021	Drew Cronic	Southern	7	3		6	2		2nd	—	—	—
2022	2022	Drew Cronic	Southern	7	4		5	3		T-3rd	—	24	21
2023	2023	Drew Cronic	Southern	8	3		6	2		T-2nd	1-1	17	20
2024	2024	Mike Jacobs	Southern	10	2		7	1		1st	1-1	8	7
2025	2025	Mike Jacobs	Southern	9	2		8	0		1st	0-1	17	18
Totals				All-time: 210–227–14 (.481)			Conference: 98–122–8 (.447)				Playoffs: 2–3 (.400)		

== See also ==
- Mercer Bears
