= Earle Smith =

American football player and coach

Playing career
- 1926–1928: Alabama
- Position: End

Coaching career (HC unless noted)
- 1938–1939: Spring Hill
- 1941: Spring Hill

Head coaching record
- Overall: 6–19–1

Accomplishments and honors

Championships
- National (1926)

Earle Smith was an American football player and coach. He served as the head football coach at Spring Hill College in Mobile, Alabama from 1938 to 1939 and in 1941. Smith played college football at the University of Alabama. He was the brother of Ben Smith, who played in the National Football League (NFL).

== Head coaching record ==
Year	Team	Overall	Conference	Standing	Bowl/playoffs
Spring Hill Badgers (Dixie Conference) (1938)
1938	Spring Hill	3–6	1–4	7th	
1939	Spring Hill	1–7–1	0–4–1	9th	
Spring Hill Badgers (Dixie Conference) (1941)
1941	Spring Hill	2–6	0–4	7th	
Spring Hill:		6–19–1	1–12–1		
Total:		6–19–1			
