= 1933 Spring Hill Badgers football team =

American college football season

1933 Spring Hill Badgers football
- Conference: Dixie Conference
- Record: 0–7–1 (0–5 Dixie)
- Head coach: Moon Ducote (5th season)

1933 Dixie Conference football standings
| | Conf. | | | | | Overall |
| Team | W | | L | | T | W | | L | | T |
|---|---|---|---|---|---|---|---|---|---|---|
| Howard (AL) $ | 4 | – | 0 | – | 1 | 7 | – | 1 | – | 2 |
| Centre | 2 | – | 0 | – | 0 | 7 | – | 3 | – | 0 |
| Mercer | 2 | – | 0 | – | 1 | 4 | – | 3 | – | 2 |
| Birmingham–Southern | 2 | – | 1 | – | 3 | 3 | – | 3 | – | 3 |
| Mississippi College | 1 | – | 1 | – | 1 | 3 | – | 4 | – | 1 |
| Millsaps | 1 | – | 1 | – | 1 | 4 | – | 4 | – | 2 |
| Southwestern (TN) | 1 | – | 3 | – | 1 | 3 | – | 4 | – | 2 |
| Chattanooga | 0 | – | 2 | – | 2 | 2 | – | 3 | – | 2 |
| Spring Hill | 0 | – | 5 | – | 0 | 0 | – | 7 | – | 1 |
$ – Conference champion

The 1933 Spring Hill Badgers football team was an American football team that represented Spring Hill College as a member of the Dixie Conference during the 1933 college football season. In their fifth year under head coach Moon Ducote, the team compiled a 0–7–1 record.

== Schedule ==
| Date | Opponent | Site | Result | Attendance | Source |
|---|---|---|---|---|---|
| September 23 | at Mercer | Centennial Stadium; Macon, GA | L 3–44 | 3,500 | |
| October 13 | at Mississippi College | State Fair Grounds; Jackson, MS | L 8–14 | 2,500 | |
| October 20 | at Loyola (LA)* | Loyola University Stadium; New Orleans, LA | L 0–45 | | |
| October 27 | at Southwestern Louisiana* | Campus Athletic Field; Lafayette, LA | L 0–21 | | |
| November 4 | Mississippi State Teachers* | Mobile, AL | T 0–0 | | |
| November 11 | at Howard (AL) | Legion Field; Birmingham, AL | L 0–50 | | |
| November 18 | Birmingham–Southern | Mobile, AL | L 0–32 | | |
| November 30 | Southwestern (TN)^{†} | Mobile, AL | L 0–12 | | |
*Non-conference game; ^{†}Homecoming
