= 1941 Spring Hill Badgers football team =

American college football season

1941 Spring Hill Badgers football
- Conference: Dixie Conference
- Record: 2–6 (0–4 Dixie)
- Head coach: Earle Smith (3rd season)

1941 Dixie Conference football standings
	Conf.					Overall
Team	W		L		T	W		L		T
Chattanooga $	4	–	0	–	1	7	–	1	–	1
Howard (AL)	2	–	0	–	1	4	–	5	–	1
Mississippi College	3	–	1	–	0	5	–	3	–	0
Millsaps	1	–	1	–	0	4	–	5	–	0
Southwestern (TN)	0	–	1	–	0	4	–	4	–	1
Mercer	0	–	3	–	0	3	–	6	–	0
Spring Hill	0	–	4	–	0	2	–	6	–	0
$ – Conference champion

The 1941 Spring Hill Badgers football team was an American football team that represented Spring Hill College as a member of the Dixie Conference during the 1940 college football season. In their third year under head coach Earle Smith, the team compiled a 2–6 record. This marked the final season for Spring Hill football as the College elected to abandon the program in January 1942.

== Schedule ==
Date	Opponent	Site	Result	Source
September 26	Livingston State*	Dorn Stadium; Mobile, AL	W 13–0	
October 3	Howard (AL)	Dorn Stadium; Mobile, AL	L 6–34	
October 10	Arkansas A&M*	Dorn Stadium; Mobile, AL	W 37–0	
October 18	at Southwestern Louisiana*	McNaspy Stadium; Lafayette, LA	L 0–39	
October 24	Mississippi Southern*	Dorn Stadium; Mobile, AL	L 7–26	
October 31	at Chattanooga	Chamberlain Field; Chattanooga, TN	L 0–49	
November 7	at Millsaps	Alumni Field; Jackson, MS	L 13–12	
November 15	Mississippi College	Dorn Stadium; Mobile, AL	L 7–53	
*Non-conference game
