= 1937 Spring Hill Badgers football team =

American college football season

1937 Spring Hill Badgers football
- Conference: Dixie Conference
- Record: 1–10 (0–5 Dixie)
- Head coach: Andrew Edington (1st season)

1937 Dixie Conference football standings
	Conf.					Overall
Team	W		L		T	W		L		T
Birmingham–Southern $	6	–	1	–	0	6	–	2	–	0
Howard (AL)	4	–	1	–	0	5	–	3	–	0
Southwestern (TN)	4	–	1	–	0	6	–	4	–	0
Mississippi College	2	–	1	–	1	3	–	6	–	1
Chattanooga	2	–	3	–	0	4	–	3	–	2
Loyola (LA)	1	–	2	–	0	2	–	6	–	1
Millsaps	1	–	3	–	1	3	–	5	–	2
Mercer	0	–	3	–	0	4	–	5	–	0
Spring Hill	0	–	5	–	0	1	–	10	–	0
$ – Conference champion

The 1937 Spring Hill Badgers football team was an American football team that represented Spring Hill College as a member of the Dixie Conference during the 1937 college football season. In their first year under head coach Andrew Edington, the team compiled a 1–10 record.

== Schedule ==
Date	Opponent	Site	Result	Attendance	Source
September 17	Delta State*	Dorn Stadium; Mobile, AL	L 7–12	5,000	
September 26	at Loyola (LA)	Loyola University Stadium; New Orleans, LA	L 0–19	7,500	
October 1	Mississippi State Teachers*	Dorn Stadium; Mobile, AL	L 0–33		
October 8	at Miami (FL)*	Burdine Stadium; Miami, FL	L 0–26		
October 15	at Southwestern Louisiana*	Campus Athletic Field; Lafayette, LA	L 6–19		
October 22	at Tampa*	Phillips Field; Tampa, FL	L 0–13		
October 29	Howard (AL)	Dorn Stadium; Mobile, AL	L 0–14		
November 5	Mississippi College	Dorn Stadium; Mobile, AL	L 6–18		
November 6	at Millsaps	Tiger Stadium; Jackson, MS	L 6–9		
November 12	at Birmingham–Southern	Legion Field; Birmingham, AL	L 0–38	1,000	
November 25	Union (TN)*	Dorn Stadium; Mobile, AL	W 18–13		
*Non-conference game
