= List of Mercer Bears head football coaches =

The Mercer college football team represents Mercer University as a member of the Southern Conference (SoCon). The Bears competes as part of the NCAA Division I Football Championship Subdivision. The program has had 22 head coaches, since it began play during the 1891 season. Since December 2025, Joel Taylor has served as head coach at Mercer.

== Key ==
Key to symbols in coaches list
General		Overall		Conference		Postseason (Note: Although the first Rose Bowl Game was played in 1902, it has been continuously played since the 1916 game, and is recognized as the oldest bowl game by the NCAA. "—" indicates any season prior to 1916 when postseason games were not played.)	
No.	Order of coaches (Note: A running total of the number of head coaches, with coaches who served separate tenures being counted only once. Interim head coaches are represented with "Int" and are not counted in the running total. "—" indicates the team played but either without a coach or no coach is on record. "X" indicates an interim year without play.)	GC	Games coached	CW	Conference wins	PW	Postseason wins
DC	Division championships	OW	Overall wins	CL	Conference losses	PL	Postseason losses
CC	Conference championships	OL	Overall losses	CT	Conference ties	PT	Postseason ties
NC	National championships	OT	Overall ties (Note: Overtime rules in college football were introduced in 1996, making ties impossible in the period since.)	C%	Conference winning percentage		
†	Elected to the College Football Hall of Fame	O%	Overall winning percentage (Note: When computing the win–loss percentage, a tie counts as half a win and half a loss.)				

== Coaches ==
List of head football coaches showing season(s) coached, overall records, conference records, postseason records, championships and selected awards (Note: Statistics correct as of the end of the 2025 NCAA Division I FCS football season.)
No.	Name (Note: Mercer did not have a head coach in 1892 and 1903.)	Season(s) (Note: Mercer did not field teams in 1894–1895, 1898–1902, 1904–1905, 1917–1918, and 1942–2012.)	GC	OW	OL	OT	O%	CW	CL	CT	C%	PW	PL	PT	CC	NC	Awards
1	Dave Beggs	1891	2	0	2	0	.000	—	—	—	—	—	—	—	—	0	—
2	George Stallings	1893	1	0	1	0	.000	—	—	—	—	—	—	—	—	0	—
3	J. D. Winston	1896	3	0	2	1	0.167	—	—	—	—	—	—	—	—	0	—
4	Gordon Saussy	1897	2	0	1	1	0.250	—	—	—	—	—	—	—	—	0	—
5	E. E. Tarr	1906	5	1	4	0	0.200	0	2	0	.000	—	—	—	0	0	—
6	H. R. Schenker	1907	6	3	3	0	0.500	0	3	0	.000	—	—	—	0	0	—
7	Frank Blake	1908–1909	15	6	9	0	0.400	0	7	0	.000	—	—	—	0	0	—
8	Charles C. Stroud	1910–1912	28	15	11	2	0.571	7	10	1	0.417	—	—	—	0	0	—
9	Lewie Hardage	1913	8	2	5	1	0.313	0	4	1	0.100	—	—	—	0	0	—
10	Fred A. Robins	1914	9	5	4	0	0.556	0	3	0	.000	—	—	—	0	0	—
11	Jake Zellars	1915–1916	12	6	16	0	0.500	2	5	0	0.286	—	—	—	0	0	—
12	David Peacock	1916	4	0	4	0	.000	0	3	0	.000	—	—	—	0	0	—
13	Maxwell James	1919	2	0	2	0	.000	0	1	0	.000	—	—	—	0	0	—
14	Josh Cody	1920–1922	29	10	19	0	0.345	3	11	0	0.214	—	—	—	0	0	—
15	Stanley L. Robinson	1923–1925	28	12	14	2	0.464	9	5	1	0.633	—	—	—	0	0	—
16	Bernie Moore^{†}	1926–1928	27	12	12	3	0.500	7	5	2	0.571	—	—	—	0	0	—
17	Lake Russell	1929–1940	112	46	61	5	0.433	—	—	—	—	—	—	—	1	0	—
18	Bobby Hooks	1941	9	3	6	0	0.333	0	3	0	.000	—	—	—	0	0	—
19	Bobby Lamb	2013–2019	80	41	39	—	0.513	24	30	—	0.444	—	—	—	0	0	—
20	Drew Cronic	2020–2023	45	28	17	—	0.622	22	10	—	0.688	—	—	—	0	0	—
21	Mike Jacobs	2024–2025	26	20	6	—	0.769	15	1	—	0.938	1	2	—	2	0	—
22	Joel Taylor	2026–present	0	0	0	—	–	0	0	—	–	0	0	—	0	0	—
