= Andrew Edington =

American football coach and college president (1914–1998)

Biographical details
- Born: January 15, 1914
- Died: April 9, 1998 (aged 84)
- Education: Alabama (MA)

Playing career
- 1933: Southwestern (TN)

Coaching career (HC unless noted)
- 1934–1935: University Military School (AL)
- 1937: Spring Hill
- 1940: Spring Hill

Head coaching record
- Overall: 4–14 (college)

Andrew Edington (January 15, 1914 – April 9, 1998) was an American football coach and college president. He served as the head football coach at Spring Hill College in 1937 and 1940.

Edington was the president of Schreiner College in Kerrville, Texas from 1950 to 1971.

== Head coaching record ==
=== College ===
Year	Team	Overall	Conference	Standing	Bowl/playoffs
Spring Hill Badgers (Dixie Conference) (1937)
1937	Spring Hill	1–9	0–4	9th	
Spring Hill Badgers (Dixie Conference) (1940)
1940	Spring Hill	3–5	1–3	4th	
Spring Hill:		4–14	1–7		
Total:		4–14			
