= 1938 Spring Hill Badgers football team =

American college football season

1938 Spring Hill Badgers football
- Conference: Dixie Conference
- Record: 3–6 (1–4 Dixie)
- Head coach: Earle Smith (1st season)

1938 Dixie Conference football standings
	Conf.					Overall
Team	W		L		T	W		L		T
Southwestern (TN) $	4	–	0	–	0	7	–	1	–	1
Mississippi College	4	–	1	–	0	7	–	2	–	0
Loyola (LA)	2	–	1	–	0	4	–	5	–	0
Howard (AL)	2	–	1	–	0	2	–	5	–	0
Chattanooga	3	–	2	–	0	4	–	5	–	0
Birmingham–Southern	4	–	3	–	0	4	–	5	–	0
Spring Hill	1	–	4	–	0	3	–	6	–	0
Mercer	0	–	3	–	0	3	–	6	–	0
Millsaps	0	–	5	–	0	1	–	10	–	0
$ – Conference champion

The 1938 Spring Hill Badgers football team was an American football team that represented Spring Hill College as a member of the Dixie Conference during the 1938 college football season. In their first year under head coach Earle Smith, the team compiled a 3–6 record.

== Schedule ==
Date	Opponent	Site	Result	Source
September 23	at Loyola (LA)	Loyola University Stadium; New Orleans, LA	L 0–13	
September 30	at Miami (FL)*	Burdine Stadium; Miami, FL	L 0–40	
October 7	Jacksonville State*	Dorn Stadium; Mobile, AL	W 60–0	
October 14	Southwestern Louisiana*	Dorn Stadium; Mobile, AL	L 7–33	
October 21	Union (TN)*	Dorn Stadium; Mobile, AL	W 14–7	
October 28	at Howard (AL)	Legion Field; Birmingham, AL	L 0–26	
November 5	at Mississippi College	Provine Field; Clinton, MS	L 0–35	
November 11	Birmingham–Southern	Dorn Stadium; Mobile, AL	L 0–7	
November 24	Millsaps	Dorn Stadium; Mobile, AL	W 26–0	
*Non-conference game
