= 1940 Spring Hill Badgers football team =

American college football season

1940 Spring Hill Badgers football
- Conference: Dixie Conference
- Record: 3–5 (1–3 Dixie)
- Head coach: Andrew Edington (2nd season)

1940 Dixie Conference football standings
	Conf.					Overall
Team	W		L		T	W		L		T
Chattanooga +	3	–	0	–	1	7	–	1	–	1
Mississippi College +	3	–	0	–	1	5	–	1	–	1
Howard (AL)	4	–	1	–	0	4	–	5	–	0
Spring Hill	1	–	3	–	0	3	–	5	–	0
Southwestern (TN)	0	–	1	–	0	3	–	5	–	1
Millsaps	0	–	3	–	0	4	–	4	–	1
Mercer	0	–	3	–	0	1	–	7	–	0
+ – Conference co-champions

The 1940 Spring Hill Badgers football team was an American football team that represented Spring Hill College as a member of the Dixie Conference during the 1940 college football season. In their second year under head coach Andrew Edington, the team compiled a 3–5 record.

== Schedule ==
Date	Opponent	Site	Result	Attendance	Source
September 27	Alabama*	Murphy High School Stadium; Mobile, AL	L 0–26	7,500	
October 4	Troy State*	Dorn Stadium; Mobile, AL	W 20–0		
October 12	at Mississippi College	Provine Field; Clinton, MS	L 7–41		
October 18	Southwestern Louisiana*	Dorn Stadium; Mobile, AL	W 13–7		
October 26	at Mississippi Southern*	Faulkner Field; Hattiesburg, MS	L 6–38		
November 8	Millsaps	Dorn Stadium; Mobile, AL	W 16–0		
November 15	Chattanooga	Dorn Stadium; Mobile, AL	L 6–34		
November 21	at Howard (AL)	Legion Field; Birmingham, AL	L 7–52	6,000	
*Non-conference game
