= 1938 Mercer Bears football team =

American college football season

1938 Mercer Bears football
- Conference: Dixie Conference
- Record: 3–6 (0–3 Dixie)
- Head coach: Lake Russell (10th season)
- Home stadium: Centennial Stadium

1938 Dixie Conference football standings
	Conf.					Overall
Team	W		L		T	W		L		T
Southwestern (TN) $	4	–	0	–	0	7	–	1	–	1
Mississippi College	4	–	1	–	0	7	–	2	–	0
Loyola (LA)	2	–	1	–	0	4	–	5	–	0
Howard (AL)	2	–	1	–	0	2	–	5	–	0
Chattanooga	3	–	2	–	0	4	–	5	–	0
Birmingham–Southern	4	–	3	–	0	4	–	5	–	0
Spring Hill	1	–	4	–	0	3	–	6	–	0
Mercer	0	–	3	–	0	3	–	6	–	0
Millsaps	0	–	5	–	0	1	–	10	–	0
$ – Conference champion

The 1938 Mercer Bears football team was an American football team that represented Mercer University as a member of the Dixie Conference during the 1938 college football season. In their tenth year under head coach Lake Russell, the team compiled a 3–6 record.

== Schedule ==
Date	Opponent	Site	Result	Attendance	Source
September 24	Wofford*	Centennial Stadium; Macon, GA	W 15–0		
October 1	at Georgia Tech*	Grant Field; Atlanta, GA	L 0–19	8,000	
October 7	vs. Birmingham–Southern	Memorial Stadium; Columbus, GA	L 0–7	4,000	
October 15	at Georgia*	Sanford Stadium; Athens, GA	L 19–28		
October 22	at Tulane*	Tulane Stadium; New Orleans, LA	L 0–51	15,000	
October 29	Oglethorpe*	Centennial Stadium; Macon, GA	W 33–7		
November 5	Presbyterian*	Centennial Stadium; Macon, GA	W 28–0		
November 11	Mississippi College	Centennial Stadium; Macon, GA	L 21–26	3,200	
November 24	at Chattanooga	Chamberlain Field; Chattanooga, TN	L 7–9	4,200	
*Non-conference game
