= 1940 Millsaps Majors football team =

American college football season

1940 Millsaps Majors football
- Conference: Dixie Conference
- Record: 4–4–1 (0–3–0 Dixie)
- Head coach: Henry Louis Stone (2nd season)
- Home stadium: Alumni Field

1940 Dixie Conference football standings
	Conf.					Overall
Team	W		L		T	W		L		T
Chattanooga +	3	–	0	–	1	7	–	1	–	1
Mississippi College +	3	–	0	–	1	5	–	1	–	1
Howard (AL)	4	–	1	–	0	4	–	5	–	0
Spring Hill	1	–	3	–	0	3	–	5	–	0
Southwestern (TN)	0	–	1	–	0	3	–	5	–	1
Millsaps	0	–	3	–	0	4	–	4	–	1
Mercer	0	–	3	–	0	1	–	7	–	0
+ – Conference co-champions

The 1940 Millsaps Majors football team was an American football team that represented Millsaps College as a member of the Dixie Conference in the 1940 college football season. Led by Henry Louis Stone in his second season as head coach, the team compiled an overall record of 4–4–1, with a mark of 0–3–0 in conference play, and finished tied for sixth in the Dixie.

Millsaps was ranked at No. 221 (out of 697 college football teams) in the final rankings under the Litkenhous Difference by Score system for 1940.

== Schedule ==
Date	Opponent	Site	Result	Attendance	Source
September 20	Louisiana College*	Alumni Field; Jackson, MS	W 14–0	1,500	
September 27	at Delta State*	Delta Field; Cleveland, MS	W 12–0		
October 4	Hendrix*	Alumni Field; Jackson, MS	W 33–7		
October 11	at Southwestern Louisiana*	McNaspy Stadium; Lafayette, LA	T 0–0	6,000	
October 19	Mississippi Southern*	Alumni Field; Jackson, MS	W 14–7		
November 2	at Mississippi College	Provine Field; Clinton, MS	L 0–27	4,000	
November 8	at Spring Hill	Dorn Stadium; Mobile, AL	L 0–16		
November 16	at No. 15 Mississippi State*	Scott Field; Starkville, MS	L 13–46	10,500	
November 27	Howard (AL)	Alumni Field; Jackson, MS	L 14–28	1,000	
*Non-conference game; Rankings from AP Poll released prior to the game
