= 1941 Howard Bulldogs football team =

American college football season

1941 Howard Bulldogs football
- Conference: Dixie Conference
- Record: 4–5–1 (2–0–1 Dixie)
- Head coach: William C. White (2nd season)
- Home stadium: Legion Field

1941 Dixie Conference football standings
	Conf.					Overall
Team	W		L		T	W		L		T
Chattanooga $	4	–	0	–	1	7	–	1	–	1
Howard (AL)	2	–	0	–	1	4	–	5	–	1
Mississippi College	3	–	1	–	0	5	–	3	–	0
Millsaps	1	–	1	–	0	4	–	5	–	0
Southwestern (TN)	0	–	1	–	0	4	–	4	–	1
Mercer	0	–	3	–	0	3	–	6	–	0
Spring Hill	0	–	4	–	0	2	–	6	–	0
$ – Conference champion

The 1941 Howard Bulldogs football team was an American football team that represented Howard College (now known as the Samford University) as a member of the Dixie Conference during the 1941 college football season. In their second year under head coach William C. White, the team compiled a 4–5–1 record.

Howard was ranked at No. 136 (out of 681 teams) in the final rankings under the Litkenhous Difference by Score System for 1941.

== Schedule ==
Date	Opponent	Site	Result	Attendance	Source
September 26	at Auburn*	Cramton Bowl; Montgomery, AL	L 0–13	9,000	
October 3	at Spring Hill	Dorn Stadium; Mobile, AL	W 34–6		
October 11	Alabama*	Legion Field; Birmingham, AL	L 0–61	6,000	
October 17	vs. Chattanooga	Memorial Stadium; Anniston, AL	T 7–7	5,000	
October 24	at Miami (FL)*	Burdine Stadium; Miami, FL	L 0–19	12,000	
November 1	Tampa*	Legion Field; Birmingham, AL	W 16–13		
November 8	at Tennessee*	Shields–Watkins Field; Knoxville, TN	L 6–28	4,000	
November 14	at Western Kentucky State Teachers*	Bowling Green, KY	W 20–7	5,000	
November 20	Mercer^{†}	Legion Field; Birmingham, AL	W 27–6	2,500	
November 28	at Rollins*	Orlando Stadium; Orlando, FL	L 0–28	3,500	
*Non-conference game; ^{†}Homecoming
