= Scrappy Moore (American football) =

American college football player and coach, athletics administrator (1902–1971)

Biographical details
- Born: September 25, 1902; Chattanooga, Tennessee, U.S.
- Died: May 31, 1971 (aged 68); Chattanooga, Tennessee, U.S.

Playing career

Football
- 1923–1925: Georgia

Baseball
- 1925: Georgia
- 1926: Columbus Foxes
- 1926: Williamsport Grays
- 1927: Spartanburg Spartans
- 1929–1932: Birmingham Barons
- 1933: Chattanooga Lookouts
- 1934: Toronto Maple Leafs
- 1934: Albany Senators
- 1934: Nashville Volunteers
- 1934: Birmingham Barons
- Positions: Quarterback (football); Outfielder (baseball)

Coaching career (HC unless noted)

Football
- 1926–1928: Chattanooga (freshmen)
- 1929–1930: Chattanooga (assistant)
- 1931–1967: Chattanooga

Administrative career (AD unless noted)
- 1931–1970: Chattanooga

Head coaching record
- Overall: 171–148–13

Accomplishments and honors

Championships
- 3 Dixie Conference (1931, 1940–1941); 1 SIAA (1931)

Awards
- AFCA College Division Coach of the Year (1967)
- College Football Hall of Fame; Inducted in 1980 (profile)

Andrew Cecil "Scrappy" Moore Sr. (September 25, 1902 – May 31, 1971) was an American college football player and coach and athletics administrator. He served as the head football coach at the University of Chattanooga—now known as the University of Tennessee at Chattanooga—from 1931 to 1967, compiling a record of 171–148–13. He had the longest tenure and the most successful record of any coach at Chattanooga. Moore played football as a quarterback at the University of Georgia. Moore's nickname "Scrappy" is currently used as the name of the mascot of UTC. He was inducted into the College Football Hall of Fame as a coach in 1980.

Moore died on May 31, 1971, in Chattanooga, Tennessee.

== Head coaching record ==
Year	Team	Overall	Conference	Standing	Bowl/playoffs
Chattanooga Moccasins (Dixie Conference / Southern Intercollegiate Athletic Association) (1931–1932)
1931	Chattanooga	9–2	4–0 / 8–0	1st / 1st	
1932	Chattanooga	3–6	2–3 / 1–4	T–6th / T–24th	
Chattanooga Moccasins (Dixie Conference) (1933–1941)
1933	Chattanooga	2–3–2	0–2–2	8th	
1934	Chattanooga	4–3–1	3–0–1	2nd	
1935	Chattanooga	4–3–1	3–1–1	2nd	
1936	Chattanooga	5–2–1	3–1–1	T–2nd	
1937	Chattanooga	4–3–2	2–3	5th	
1938	Chattanooga	4–5	3–2	5th	
1939	Chattanooga	5–2–1	2–1–1	T–4th	
1940	Chattanooga	7–1–1	3–0–1	T–1st	
1941	Chattanooga	7–1–1	4–0–1	1st	
Chattanooga Moccasins (NCAA College Division independent) (1942–1967)
1942	Chattanooga	7–4			
1943	No team—World War II				
1944	No team—World War II				
1945	Chattanooga	5–3			
1946	Chattanooga	5–5			
1947	Chattanooga	4–6			
1948	Chattanooga	4–5			
1949	Chattanooga	5–4			
1950	Chattanooga	1–9			
1951	Chattanooga	6–5			
1952	Chattanooga	7–3			
1953	Chattanooga	3–7			
1954	Chattanooga	6–4			
1955	Chattanooga	5–4–1			
1956	Chattanooga	5–4			
1957	Chattanooga	4–5–1			
1958	Chattanooga	5–5			
1959	Chattanooga	3–7			
1960	Chattanooga	5–5			
1961	Chattanooga	4–6			
1962	Chattanooga	5–5			
1963	Chattanooga	4–6			
1964	Chattanooga	7–3			
1965	Chattanooga	5–4–1			
1966	Chattanooga	5–5			
1967	Chattanooga	7–3			
Chattanooga:		171–148–13	33–13–8		
Total:		171–148–13			
National championship Conference title Conference division title or championship game berth
