= 1941 Millsaps Majors football team =

American college football season

1941 Millsaps Majors football
- Conference: Dixie Conference
- Record: 4–5 (1–1 Dixie)
- Head coach: Henry Louis Stone (3rd season)
- Home stadium: Alumni Field

1941 Dixie Conference football standings
	Conf.					Overall
Team	W		L		T	W		L		T
Chattanooga $	4	–	0	–	1	7	–	1	–	1
Howard (AL)	2	–	0	–	1	4	–	5	–	1
Mississippi College	3	–	1	–	0	5	–	3	–	0
Millsaps	1	–	1	–	0	4	–	5	–	0
Southwestern (TN)	0	–	1	–	0	4	–	4	–	1
Mercer	0	–	3	–	0	3	–	6	–	0
Spring Hill	0	–	4	–	0	2	–	6	–	0
$ – Conference champion

The 1941 Millsaps Majors football team was an American football team that represented Millsaps College as a member of the Dixie Conference in the 1941 college football season. Led by Henry Louis Stone in his third season as head coach, the team compiled an overall record of 4–5, with a mark of 1–1 in conference play, and finished fourth in the Dixie.

Millsaps was ranked at No. 223 (out of 681 teams) in the final rankings under the Litkenhous Difference by Score System for 1941.

== Schedule ==
Date	Opponent	Site	Result	Attendance	Source
September 20	at Centenary*	Centenary Field; Shreveport, LA	W 20–0	5,000	
September 28	Louisiana College*	Alumni Field; Jackson, MS	W 19–0		
October 3	at Memphis State*	Crump Stadium; Memphis, TN	L 6–21		
October 10	at Southwestern Louisiana*	McNaspy Stadium; Lafayette, LA	L 0–6		
October 17	at Mississippi Southern*	Faulkner Field; Hattiesburg, MS	L 0–20	10,000	
November 3	Mississippi College	Alumni Field; Jackson, MS (rivalry)	L 0–21		
November 7	Spring Hill	Alumni Field; Jackson, MS	W 14–13		
November 14	Delta State*	Alumni Field; Jackson, MS	W 40–0		
November 22	at Mississippi State*	Scott Field; Starkville, MS	L 6–49	8,000	
*Non-conference game
