= 1940 Southwestern Lynx football team =

American college football season

1940 Southwestern Lynx football
- Conference: Dixie Conference
- Record: 3–5–1 (0–1–0 Dixie)
- Head coach: Ed Kubale (3rd season)
- Home stadium: Crump Stadium

1940 Dixie Conference football standings
	Conf.					Overall
Team	W		L		T	W		L		T
Chattanooga +	3	–	0	–	1	7	–	1	–	1
Mississippi College +	3	–	0	–	1	5	–	1	–	1
Howard (AL)	4	–	1	–	0	4	–	5	–	0
Spring Hill	1	–	3	–	0	3	–	5	–	0
Southwestern (TN)	0	–	1	–	0	3	–	5	–	1
Millsaps	0	–	3	–	0	4	–	4	–	1
Mercer	0	–	3	–	0	1	–	7	–	0
+ – Conference co-champions

The 1940 Southwestern Lynx football team was an American football team that represented Southwestern, The College of the Mississippi Valley (now known as Rhodes College) as a member of the Dixie Conference in the 1940 college football season. Led by Ed Kubale in his third season as head coach, the team compiled an overall record of 3–5–1, with a mark of 0–1–0 in conference play, and finished fifth in the Dixie.

Southwestern was ranked at No. 132 (out of 697 college football teams) in the final rankings under the Litkenhous Difference by Score system for 1940.

== Schedule ==
Date	Opponent	Site	Result	Attendance	Source
September 28	vs. West Tennessee State Teachers*	Crump Stadium; Memphis, TN	W 34–0	7,000	
October 5	Ole Miss*	Crump Stadium; Memphis, TN	L 6–27	10,000	
October 10	at Union (TN)*	Rothrock Field; Jackson, TN	W 27–6		
October 18	at Hendrix*	Memorial Stadium; Conway, AR	W 21–0		
October 26	at Howard (AL)	Legion Field; Birmingham, AL	L 7–13		
November 2	No. 20 Mississippi State*	Crump Stadium; Memphis, TN	L 0–13	9,000	
November 9	No. 5 Tennessee*	Crump Stadium; Memphis, TN	L 0–40	8,000	
November 16	Clemson*	Crump Stadium; Memphis, TN	T 12–12	6,000	
November 23	Centenary*	Crump Stadium; Memphis, TN	L 6–14	4,000	
*Non-conference game; Rankings from AP Poll released prior to the game
