= 1904 Spring Hill Badgers football team =

American college football season

1904 Spring Hill Badgers football
- Conference: Independent
- Record: 2–0

The 1904 Spring Hill Badgers football team represented Spring Hill College as an independent during the 1904 college football season. The Fort Morgan soldier outweighed the team by twenty pounds.

== Schedule ==
Date	Opponent	Site	Result
November 8	Mobile Military Institute		W 27–0
November ?	Fort Morgan		W 15–0
