= 1937 Loyola Wolf Pack football team =

American college football season

1937 Loyola Wolf Pack football
- Conference: Dixie Conference
- Record: 2–6–1 (1–2 Dixie)
- Head coach: Larry Mullins (1st season)
- Home stadium: Loyola University Stadium

1937 Dixie Conference football standings
	Conf.					Overall
Team	W		L		T	W		L		T
Birmingham–Southern $	6	–	1	–	0	6	–	2	–	0
Howard (AL)	4	–	1	–	0	5	–	3	–	0
Southwestern (TN)	4	–	1	–	0	6	–	4	–	0
Mississippi College	2	–	1	–	1	3	–	6	–	1
Chattanooga	2	–	3	–	0	4	–	3	–	2
Loyola (LA)	1	–	2	–	0	2	–	6	–	1
Millsaps	1	–	3	–	1	3	–	5	–	2
Mercer	0	–	3	–	0	4	–	5	–	0
Spring Hill	0	–	5	–	0	1	–	10	–	0
$ – Conference champion

The 1937 Loyola Wolf Pack football team was an American football team that represented Loyola College of New Orleans (now known as Loyola University New Orleans) as a member of the Dixie Conference during the 1937 college football season. In their first season under head coach Larry Mullins, the team compiled a 2–6–1 record.

== Schedule ==
Date	Opponent	Site	Result	Attendance	Source
September 26	Spring Hill	Loyola University Stadium; New Orleans, LA	W 19–0	7,500	
October 2	at Catholic University*	Brookland Stadium; Washington, DC	L 0–14	6,000	
October 8	Birmingham–Southern	Loyola University Stadium; New Orleans, LA	L 0–14	3,500	
October 17	St. Edward's*	Loyola University Stadium; New Orleans, LA	W 13–0		
October 24	DePaul*	City Park Stadium; New Orleans, LA	L 18–7	18,000–20,000	
October 30	at LSU*	Tiger Stadium; Baton Rouge, LA	L 6–52	12,000	
November 5	Texas Tech*	Loyola University Stadium; New Orleans, LA	L 6–25		
November 11	at Southwestern (TN)	Crump Stadium; Memphis, TN	L 0–40	6,000	
November 21	at St. Mary's (TX)*	San Antonio, TX	T 6–6		
*Non-conference game
