= 1933 Birmingham–Southern Panthers football team =

American college football season

1933 Birmingham–Southern Panthers football
- Conference: Dixie Conference
- Record: 3–3–3 (2–1–3 Dixie)
- Head coach: Jenks Gillem (6th season)
- Home stadium: Legion Field; Munger Bowl

1933 Dixie Conference football standings
	Conf.					Overall
Team	W		L		T	W		L		T
Howard (AL) $	4	–	0	–	1	7	–	1	–	2
Centre	2	–	0	–	0	7	–	3	–	0
Mercer	2	–	0	–	1	4	–	3	–	2
Birmingham–Southern	2	–	1	–	3	3	–	3	–	3
Mississippi College	1	–	1	–	1	3	–	4	–	1
Millsaps	1	–	1	–	1	4	–	4	–	2
Southwestern (TN)	1	–	3	–	1	3	–	4	–	2
Chattanooga	0	–	2	–	2	2	–	3	–	2
Spring Hill	0	–	5	–	0	0	–	7	–	1
$ – Conference champion

The 1933 Birmingham–Southern Panthers football team was an American football team that represented Birmingham–Southern College as a member of the Dixie Conference during the 1933 college football season. In their sixth season under head coach Jenks Gillem, the team compiled a 3–3–3 record.

== Schedule ==
Date	Time	Opponent	Site	Result	Attendance	Source
September 22		at Auburn*	Cramton Bowl; Montgomery, AL	L 7–20	10,000	
October 7		at Southwestern (TN)	Fargason Field; Memphis, TN	W 20–0		
October 14		Mercer	Legion Field; Birmingham, AL	T 0–0		
October 20		at Millsaps	Municipal Stadium; Jackson, MS	T 0–0		
October 27		Jacksonville State*	Munger Bowl; Birmingham, AL	W 38–0		
November 4		Ole Miss*	Hemingway Stadium; Oxford, MS	L 0–12		
November 11	2:15 p.m.	at Centre	Cheek Field; Danville, KY	L 6–13	2,000	
November 18		at Spring Hill	Mobile, AL	W 32–0		
November 30		vs. Howard (AL)	Legion Field; Birmingham, AL	T 7–7	20,000	
*Non-conference game; All times are in Central time
