= 1941 Southwestern Lynx football team =

American college football season

1941 Southwestern Lynx football
- Conference: Dixie Conference
- Record: 4–4–1 (0–1 Dixie)
- Head coach: Ed Kubale (4th season)
- Home stadium: Crump Stadium

1941 Dixie Conference football standings
	Conf.					Overall
Team	W		L		T	W		L		T
Chattanooga $	4	–	0	–	1	7	–	1	–	1
Howard (AL)	2	–	0	–	1	4	–	5	–	1
Mississippi College	3	–	1	–	0	5	–	3	–	0
Millsaps	1	–	1	–	0	4	–	5	–	0
Southwestern (TN)	0	–	1	–	0	4	–	4	–	1
Mercer	0	–	3	–	0	3	–	6	–	0
Spring Hill	0	–	4	–	0	2	–	6	–	0
$ – Conference champion

The 1941 Southwestern Lynx football team was an American football team that represented Southwestern, The College of the Mississippi Valley (now known as Rhodes College) as a member of the Dixie Conference in the 1941 college football season. Led by Ed Kubale in his fourth season as head coach, the team compiled an overall record of 4–4–1, with a mark of 0–1 in conference play, and finished fifth in the Dixie.

== Schedule ==
Date	Opponent	Site	Result	Attendance	Source
September 23	vs. Memphis State*	Crump Stadium; Memphis, TN	W 13–7	8,000	
October 4	at Ole Miss*	Hemingway Stadium; Oxford, MS	L 0–27	4,500	
October 11	Jefferson Barracks*	Crump Stadium; Memphis, TN	W 25–0	3,000	
October 18	Sewanee*	Crump Stadium; Memphis, TN (rivalry)	W 35–0		
October 24	at Chattanooga	Chamberlain Field; Chattanooga, TN	L 0–7	4,632	
November 1	No. 17 Mississippi State*	Crump Stadium; Memphis, TN	L 6–20		
November 8	Union (TN)*	Crump Stadium; Memphis, TN	W 21–14	2,000	
November 15	at Kentucky*	McLean Stadium; Lexington, KY	L 19–33	8,000	
November 22	at Centenary*	Centenary Field; Shreveport, LA	T 0–0		
*Non-conference game; Rankings from AP Poll released prior to the game
