= 1937 Southwestern Lynx football team =

American college football season

1937 Southwestern Lynx football
- Conference: Dixie Conference
- Record: 6–4 (4–1 Dixie)
- Head coach: Clyde Propst (3rd season)
- Home stadium: Mid-South Fairgrounds; Crump Stadium

1937 Dixie Conference football standings
	Conf.					Overall
Team	W		L		T	W		L		T
Birmingham–Southern $	6	–	1	–	0	6	–	2	–	0
Howard (AL)	4	–	1	–	0	5	–	3	–	0
Southwestern (TN)	4	–	1	–	0	6	–	4	–	0
Mississippi College	2	–	1	–	1	3	–	6	–	1
Chattanooga	2	–	3	–	0	4	–	3	–	2
Loyola (LA)	1	–	2	–	0	2	–	6	–	1
Millsaps	1	–	3	–	1	3	–	5	–	2
Mercer	0	–	3	–	0	4	–	5	–	0
Spring Hill	0	–	5	–	0	1	–	10	–	0
$ – Conference champion

The 1937 Southwestern Lynx football team was an American football team that represented Southwestern, The College of the Mississippi Valley (now known as Rhodes College) as a member of the Dixie Conference in the 1937 college football season. Led by Clyde Propst in his third season as head coach, the team compiled an overall record of 6–4, with a mark of 4–1 in conference play, and finished tied for second in the Dixie.

== Schedule ==
Date	Time	Opponent	Site	Result	Attendance	Source
September 18		Arkansas State*	Mid-South Fairgrounds; Memphis, TN	W 67–0	4,000	
September 25		Union (TN)*	Mid-South Fairgrounds; Memphis, TN	W 32–0		
October 2		Millsaps	Mid-South Fairgrounds; Memphis, TN	W 14–0		
October 9		Vanderbilt*	Crump Stadium; Memphis, TN	L 6–17	10,000	
October 16		vs. Hendrix*	Central High School Stadium; Little Rock, AR	L 7–21	2,000	
October 22		at Birmingham–Southern	Legion Field; Birmingham, AL	W 26–7		
October 30		Chattanooga	Crump Stadium; Memphis, TN	W 24–13	6,500	
November 6		Howard (AL)	Crump Stadium; Memphis, TN	L 12–13	7,000	
November 11		Loyola (LA)	Crump Stadium; Memphis, TN	W 40–0	6,000	
November 20	2:00 p.m.	Centre*	Crump Stadium; Memphis, TN	L 6–7	3,500–5,000	
*Non-conference game; All times are in Central time
