= 1933 Chattanooga Moccasins football team =

American college football season

1933 Chattanooga Moccasins football
- Conference: Dixie Conference
- Record: 2–3–2 (0–2–2 Dixie)
- Head coach: Scrappy Moore (3rd season)
- Captain: Dudley Merritt
- Home stadium: Chamberlain Field

1933 Dixie Conference football standings
	Conf.					Overall
Team	W		L		T	W		L		T
Howard (AL) $	4	–	0	–	1	7	–	1	–	2
Centre	2	–	0	–	0	7	–	3	–	0
Mercer	2	–	0	–	1	4	–	3	–	2
Birmingham–Southern	2	–	1	–	3	3	–	3	–	3
Mississippi College	1	–	1	–	1	3	–	4	–	1
Millsaps	1	–	1	–	1	4	–	4	–	2
Southwestern (TN)	1	–	3	–	1	3	–	4	–	2
Chattanooga	0	–	2	–	2	2	–	3	–	2
Spring Hill	0	–	5	–	0	0	–	7	–	1
$ – Conference champion

The 1933 Chattanooga Moccasins football team was an American football team that represented the University of Chattanooga (now known as the University of Tennessee at Chattanooga) in the Dixie Conference during the 1933 college football season. In its third year under head coach Scrappy Moore, the team compiled a 2–3–2 record.

== Schedule ==
Date	Time	Opponent	Site	Result	Attendance	Source
October 7		Middle Tennessee State Teachers*	Chamberlain Field; Chattanooga, TN	W 46–0	2,000	
October 14		Oglethorpe*	Chamberlain Field; Chattanooga, TN	W 16–12		
October 20		at Catholic University*	Griffith Stadium; Washington, DC	L 0–25	10,000	
October 28		Mississippi College	Chamberlain Field; Chattanooga, TN	T 0–0		
November 11		Mercer	Chamberlain Field; Chattanooga, TN	L 0–7	3,000	
November 18		at Southwestern (TN)	Faragason Field; Memphis, TN	T 0–0	1,200	
November 30	2:00 p.m.	Centre	Chamberlain Field; Chattanooga, TN	L 6–13	2,500	
*Non-conference game; All times are in Central time
