= William Bancroft (disambiguation) =

William Bancroft (1855–1922) was an American soldier, businessman, and politician from Massachusetts.

William Bancroft may also refer to:

- William Poole Bancroft (1835–1928), American industrialist and conservationist
- Billy Bancroft (1871–1959), Welsh rugby player and cricketer
- Billy Bancroft (coach) (1904–1993), American college football, basketball and baseball coach
