= 1938 Birmingham–Southern Panthers football team =

American college football season

1938 Birmingham–Southern Panthers football
- Conference: Dixie Conference
- Record: 4–5 (4–3 Dixie)
- Head coach: Jenks Gillem (11th season)
- Home stadium: Legion Field

1938 Dixie Conference football standings
| | Conf. | | | | | Overall |
| Team | W | | L | | T | W | | L | | T |
|---|---|---|---|---|---|---|---|---|---|---|
| Southwestern (TN) $ | 4 | – | 0 | – | 0 | 7 | – | 1 | – | 1 |
| Mississippi College | 4 | – | 1 | – | 0 | 7 | – | 2 | – | 0 |
| Loyola (LA) | 2 | – | 1 | – | 0 | 4 | – | 5 | – | 0 |
| Howard (AL) | 2 | – | 1 | – | 0 | 2 | – | 5 | – | 0 |
| Chattanooga | 3 | – | 2 | – | 0 | 4 | – | 5 | – | 0 |
| Birmingham–Southern | 4 | – | 3 | – | 0 | 4 | – | 5 | – | 0 |
| Spring Hill | 1 | – | 4 | – | 0 | 3 | – | 6 | – | 0 |
| Mercer | 0 | – | 3 | – | 0 | 3 | – | 6 | – | 0 |
| Millsaps | 0 | – | 5 | – | 0 | 1 | – | 10 | – | 0 |
$ – Conference champion

The 1938 Birmingham–Southern Panthers football team was an American football team that represented Birmingham–Southern College as a member of the Dixie Conference during the 1938 college football season. In their eleventh season under head coach Jenks Gillem, the team compiled a 4–5 record.

== Schedule ==
| Date | Opponent | Site | Result | Attendance | Source |
|---|---|---|---|---|---|
| September 23 | at Auburn* | Cramton Bowl; Montgomery, AL | L 0–14 | | |
| September 30 | at Loyola (LA) | Loyola University Stadium; New Orleans, LA | L 0–19 | | |
| October 7 | vs. Mercer | Memorial Stadium; Columbus, GA | W 7–0 | 4,000 | |
| October 15 | at Murray State* | Cutchin Stadium; Murray, KY | L 14–47 | 6,000 | |
| October 22 | at Southwestern (TN) | Crump Stadium; Memphis, TN | L 7–46 | | |
| October 28 | vs. Chattanooga | Murphree Stadium; Gadsden, AL | W 12–6 | 3,500 | |
| November 4 | Millsaps | Legion Field; Birmingham, AL | W 20–0 | | |
| November 11 | at Spring Hill | Mobile, AL | W 7–0 | | |
| November 19 | vs. Howard (AL) | Legion Field; Birmingham, AL | L 0–25 | 4,000 | |
*Non-conference game
