= 1937 Chattanooga Moccasins football team =

American college football season

1937 Chattanooga Moccasins football
- Conference: Dixie Conference
- Record: 4–3–2 (2–3 Dixie)
- Head coach: Scrappy Moore (7th season)
- Captain: George Koeninger
- Home stadium: Chamberlain Field

1937 Dixie Conference football standings
	Conf.					Overall
Team	W		L		T	W		L		T
Birmingham–Southern $	6	–	1	–	0	6	–	2	–	0
Howard (AL)	4	–	1	–	0	5	–	3	–	0
Southwestern (TN)	4	–	1	–	0	6	–	4	–	0
Mississippi College	2	–	1	–	1	3	–	6	–	1
Chattanooga	2	–	3	–	0	4	–	3	–	2
Loyola (LA)	1	–	2	–	0	2	–	6	–	1
Millsaps	1	–	3	–	1	3	–	5	–	2
Mercer	0	–	3	–	0	4	–	5	–	0
Spring Hill	0	–	5	–	0	1	–	10	–	0
$ – Conference champion

The 1937 Chattanooga Moccasins football team was an American football team that represented the University of Chattanooga (now known as the University of Tennessee at Chattanooga) in the Dixie Conference during the 1937 college football season. In its seventh year under head coach Scrappy Moore, the team compiled a 4–3–2 record.

== Schedule ==
Date	Time	Opponent	Site	Result	Attendance	Source
September 24		Maryville (TN)*	Chamberlain Field; Chattanooga, TN	W 19–0		
October 1		Mississippi College	Chamberlain Field; Chattanooga, TN	W 13–0	3,500	
October 8	8:00 p.m.	Centre	Chamberlain Field; Chattanooga, TN	T 0–0	3,500	
October 15		Oglethorpe*	Chamberlain Field; Chattanooga, TN	T 0–0		
October 23		at Howard (AL)	Legion Field; Birmingham, AL	L 0–6	2,151	
October 30		at Southwestern (TN)	Crump Stadium; Memphis, TN	L 13–24	6,500	
November 6		Birmingham–Southern	Chamberlain Field; Chattanooga, TN	L 18–19	3,100	
November 13		at Union (TN)*	Jackson, TN	W 33–0		
November 25		Mercer	Chamberlain Field; Chattanooga, TN	W 19–7		
*Non-conference game; All times are in Central time
