= 1937 Howard Bulldogs football team =

American college football season

1937 Howard Bulldogs football
- Conference: Dixie Conference
- Record: 5–3 (4–1 Dixie)
- Head coach: Billy Bancroft (3rd season)
- Home stadium: Legion Field

1937 Dixie Conference football standings
	Conf.					Overall
Team	W		L		T	W		L		T
Birmingham–Southern $	6	–	1	–	0	6	–	2	–	0
Howard (AL)	4	–	1	–	0	5	–	3	–	0
Southwestern (TN)	4	–	1	–	0	6	–	4	–	0
Mississippi College	2	–	1	–	1	3	–	6	–	1
Chattanooga	2	–	3	–	0	4	–	3	–	2
Loyola (LA)	1	–	2	–	0	2	–	6	–	1
Millsaps	1	–	3	–	1	3	–	5	–	2
Mercer	0	–	3	–	0	4	–	5	–	0
Spring Hill	0	–	5	–	0	1	–	10	–	0
$ – Conference champion

The 1937 Howard Bulldogs football team was an American football team that represented Howard College (now known as the Samford University) as a member of the Dixie Conference during the 1937 college football season. In their third year under head coach Billy Bancroft, the team compiled a 5–3 record.

== Schedule ==
Date	Opponent	Site	Result	Attendance	Source
September 25	at Alabama*	Denny Stadium; Tuscaloosa, AL	L 0–41	7,500	
October 2	at Mississippi State*	Scott Field; Starkville, MS	L 0–38	4,000	
October 9	Mercer	Legion Field; Birmingham, AL	W 13–0	857	
October 23	Chattanooga	Legion Field; Birmingham, AL	W 6–0	2,151	
October 29	at Spring Hill	Dorn Stadium; Mobile, AL	W 14–0		
November 6	at Southwestern (TN)	Crump Stadium; Memphis, TN	W 13–12	7,000	
November 12	vs. Emory and Henry*	Florence, AL	W 39–0		
November 25	vs. Birmingham–Southern	Legion Field; Birmingham, AL	L 20–21		
*Non-conference game
