= Ed Kubale =

American football player and coach (1899–1971)

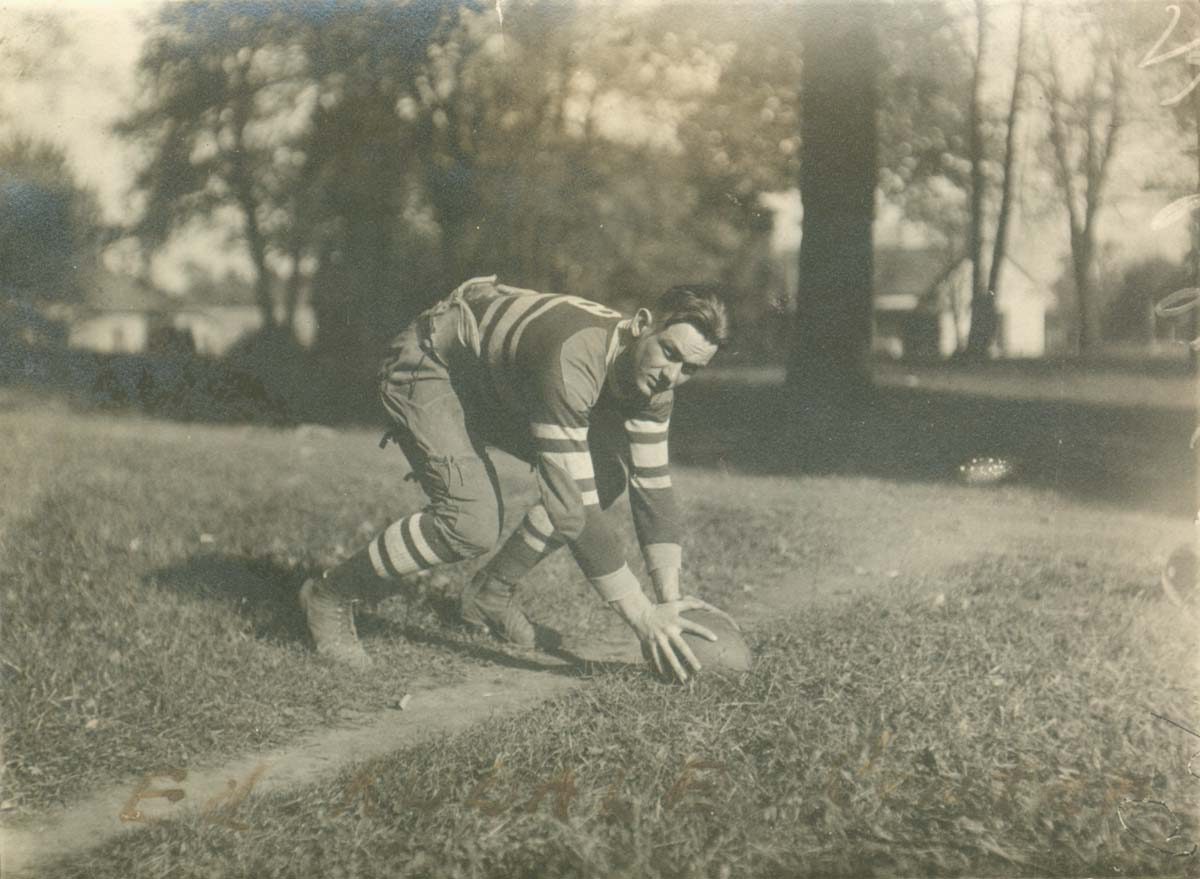
- Kubale, c. 1921

Biographical details
- Born: November 22, 1899; South Bend, Indiana, U.S.
- Died: February 4, 1971 (aged 71); Danville, Kentucky, U.S.

Playing career
- 1920–1923: Centre
- Position: Center

Coaching career (HC unless noted)
- 1925–1928: TCU (line)
- 1929–1937: Centre
- 1938–1941: Southwestern (TN)
- 1944: Brooklyn Tigers

Administrative career (AD unless noted)
- 1929–1938: Centre
- 1938–1942: Southwestern (TN)

Head coaching record
- Overall: 67–47–8 (college)

Accomplishments and honors

Championships
- 2 KIAC (1936–1937); 2 Dixie (1938–1939)

Awards
- All-American Honorable Mention (1922); 2× All-Southern (1921, 1923)

Edwin C. Kubale (November 22, 1899 – February 4, 1971) was an American college football player and coach. He served as the head football coach at Centre College in Danville, Kentucky from 1928 to 1937 and Southwestern Presbyterian University—now known as Rhodes College—in Memphis, Tennessee from 1938 to 1941, compiling a career headcoaching record of 67–47–8. Kubale played college football at the Center position at Centre.

== Centre College ==
Kubale came to Centre College from Fort Smith, Arkansas, where he played for coach Frank Bridges. Kubale played center for the Centre Praying Colonels. He replaced All-American Red Weaver at the center position in 1921, the same year that Centre upset Harvard 6 to 0. Walter Camp gave him honorable mention All-America in 1922. Kubale was captain of the 1923 team. He was twice selected All-Southern. Kubale wore number 8.

== Coaching career ==
Kubale coached in the National Football League (NFL) during the 1944 season for the Brooklyn Tigers. During his time with the Tigers he was a co-coach with Frank Bridges and Pete Cawthon.

== Head coaching record ==
=== College ===
Year	Team	Overall	Conference	Standing	Bowl/playoffs
Centre Colonels (Southern Intercollegiate Athletic Association) (1929–1930)
1929	Centre	5–3–1	4–0–1	T–2nd	
1930	Centre	7–3	5–0	2nd	
Centre Colonels (Dixie Conference / Southern Intercollegiate Athletic Association) (1931–1935)
1931	Centre	8–2–1	1–1 / 5–1	T–4th / 5th	
1932	Centre	6–3	2–1 / 4–1	T–3rd / T–7th	
1933	Centre	7–3	2–0 / 3–1	2nd / T–8th	
1934	Centre	5–5	1–1 / 4–1	T–4th / T–6th	
1935	Centre	1–7–1	0–0–1 / 1–1	10th / T–15th	
Centre Colonels (Kentucky Intercollegiate Athletic Conference / Southern Intercollegiate Athletic Association) (1936–1937)
1936	Centre	5–4	2–0 / 2–0	T–1st / T–4th	
1937	Centre	6–2–1	2–0 / 3–0	1st / T–3rd	
Centre:		50–32–4			
Southwestern Lynx (Dixie Conference) (1938–1941)
1938	Southwestern	7–1–1	4–0	1st	
1939	Southwestern	3–5–1	2–0	1st	
1940	Southwestern	3–5–1	0–1	5th	
1941	Southwestern	4–4–1	0–1	5th	
Southwestern:		17–15–4	6–2		
Total:		67–47–8			
National championship Conference title Conference division title or championship game berth
