= Jenks Gillem =

American football player and coach (1890–1951)

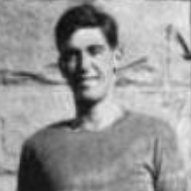

Biographical details
- Born: October 6, 1890; Nashville, Tennessee, U.S.
- Died: November 11, 1951 (aged 61); Gadsden, Alabama, U.S.

Playing career
- 1910–1912: Sewanee
- Positions: End, punter

Coaching career (HC unless noted)
- 1919–1922: Birmingham–Southern (assistant)
- 1923: Howard (AL) (assistant)
- 1924–1926: Howard (AL)
- 1928–1939: Birmingham–Southern
- 1940–1941: Sewanee

Head coaching record
- Overall: 73–65–10

Accomplishments and honors

Championships
- 2 Dixie (1934, 1937)

Awards
- 3× All-Southern (1910, 1911, 1912); Associated Press Southeast Area All-Time football team 1869-1919 era. Sewanee All-Time Football Team

Jennings Frederick Gillem (October 6, 1890 – November 11, 1951), nicknamed "Jenks" and "Sam", was an American college football player and coach. Gillem played for the Sewanee Tigers of Sewanee: The University of the South, and was selected All-Southern in 1910, 1911, and 1912. His ability punting the football netted him a spot on an Associated Press All-Time Southeast 1869-1919 era team. In 1915 he was selected by John Heisman one of the 30 greatest Southern football players.

He served as the head football coach at Howard College—now known as Samford University (1924–1926), Birmingham–Southern College (1928–1939), and Sewanee (1940–1941), compiling a career college football record of 73–65–10. Gillem died on November 11, 1951, at a hospital in Gadsden, Alabama, after a long illness. He was 5'9" and 150 pounds.

== Head coaching record ==
Year	Team	Overall	Conference	Standing	Bowl/playoffs
Howard Bulldogs (Southern Intercollegiate Athletic Association) (1924–1926)
1924	Howard	3–5–1	1–3	T–14th	
1925	Howard	6–3	4–2	8th	
1926	Howard	4–4–1	2–3–1	18th	
Howard:		13–12–2			
Birmingham–Southern Panthers (Southern Intercollegiate Athletic Association) (1928–1930)
1928	Birmingham–Southern	3–2–4	2–2–3	14th	
1929	Birmingham–Southern	4–4	4–3	15th	
1930	Birmingham–Southern	5–4	3–3	T–13th	
Birmingham–Southern Panthers (Southern Intercollegiate Athletic Association / Dixie Conference) (1931)
1931	Birmingham–Southern	5–4	2–3 / 4–3	6th / T–12th	
Birmingham–Southern Panthers (Dixie Conference) (1932–1938)
1932	Birmingham–Southern	5–3	5–1	2nd	
1933	Birmingham–Southern	3–3–3	2–1–3	4th	
1934	Birmingham–Southern	9–0	5–0	1st	
1935	Birmingham–Southern	2–6	2–5	8th	
1936	Birmingham–Southern	4–5	4–3	4th	
1937	Birmingham–Southern	6–2	6–1	1st	
1938	Birmingham–Southern	4–5	4–3	6th	
1939	Birmingham–Southern	3–5–1	2–3–1	T–6th	
Birmingham–Southern:		53–43–8			
Sewanee Tigers (Southeastern Conference) (1940)
1940	Sewanee	3–5	0–1	13th	
Sewanee Tigers (Independent) (1941)
1941	Sewanee	2–5			
Sewanee:		5–10	0–1		
Total:		73–65–10			
National championship Conference title Conference division title or championship game berth
