= 1937 Mercer Bears football team =

American college football season

1937 Mercer Bears football
- Conference: Dixie Conference
- Record: 4–5 (0–3 Dixie)
- Head coach: Lake Russell (9th season)
- Home stadium: Centennial Stadium

1937 Dixie Conference football standings
| | Conf. | | | | | Overall |
| Team | W | | L | | T | W | | L | | T |
|---|---|---|---|---|---|---|---|---|---|---|
| Birmingham–Southern $ | 6 | – | 1 | – | 0 | 6 | – | 2 | – | 0 |
| Howard (AL) | 4 | – | 1 | – | 0 | 5 | – | 3 | – | 0 |
| Southwestern (TN) | 4 | – | 1 | – | 0 | 6 | – | 4 | – | 0 |
| Mississippi College | 2 | – | 1 | – | 1 | 3 | – | 6 | – | 1 |
| Chattanooga | 2 | – | 3 | – | 0 | 4 | – | 3 | – | 2 |
| Loyola (LA) | 1 | – | 2 | – | 0 | 2 | – | 6 | – | 1 |
| Millsaps | 1 | – | 3 | – | 1 | 3 | – | 5 | – | 2 |
| Mercer | 0 | – | 3 | – | 0 | 4 | – | 5 | – | 0 |
| Spring Hill | 0 | – | 5 | – | 0 | 1 | – | 10 | – | 0 |
$ – Conference champion

The 1937 Mercer Bears football team was an American football team that represented Mercer University as a member of the Dixie Conference during the 1937 college football season. In their ninth year under head coach Lake Russell, the team compiled a 4–5 record.

== Schedule ==
| Date | Time | Opponent | Site | Result | Attendance | Source |
|---|---|---|---|---|---|---|
| September 24 | 8:30 p.m. | South Georgia Teachers* | Centennial Stadium; Macon, GA | W 0–77 | | |
| October 2 | | at Georgia Tech* | Grant Field; Atlanta, GA | L 0–28 | | |
| October 9 | | at Howard (AL) | Legion Field; Birmingham, AL | L 0–13 | 857 | |
| October 15 | | vs. Birmingham–Southern | Memorial Stadium; Columbus, GA | L 0–7 | | |
| October 23 | | at Georgia* | Sanford Stadium; Athens, GA | L 0–19 | 5,000 | |
| October 29 | | Oglethorpe* | Centennial Stadium; Macon, GA | W 13–6 | | |
| November 5 | | at Presbyterian* | Bailey Stadium; Clinton, SC | W 25–13 | | |
| November 12 | | at Tampa* | Phillips Field; Tampa, FL | W 20–0 | 2,500 | |
| November 25 | | at Chattanooga | Chamberlain Field; Chattanooga, TN | L 7–19 | | |
*Non-conference game; All times are in Eastern time
