= 1940 Howard Bulldogs football team =

American college football season

1940 Howard Bulldogs football
- Conference: Dixie Conference
- Record: 4–5 (4–1 Dixie)
- Head coach: William C. White (1st season)
- Home stadium: Legion Field

1940 Dixie Conference football standings
	Conf.					Overall
Team	W		L		T	W		L		T
Chattanooga +	3	–	0	–	1	7	–	1	–	1
Mississippi College +	3	–	0	–	1	5	–	1	–	1
Howard (AL)	4	–	1	–	0	4	–	5	–	0
Spring Hill	1	–	3	–	0	3	–	5	–	0
Southwestern (TN)	0	–	1	–	0	3	–	5	–	1
Millsaps	0	–	3	–	0	4	–	4	–	1
Mercer	0	–	3	–	0	1	–	7	–	0
+ – Conference co-champions

The 1940 Howard Bulldogs football team was an American football team that represented Howard College (now known as the Samford University) as a member of the Dixie Conference during the 1940 college football season. In their first year under head coach William C. White, the team compiled a 4–5 record.

== Schedule ==
Date	Opponent	Site	Result	Attendance	Source
September 27	at Auburn*	Cramton Bowl; Montgomery, AL	L 13–27	10,000	
October 5	at Georgia Tech*	Grant Field; Atlanta, GA	L 0–27	15,000	
October 12	at Alabama*	Denny Stadium; Tuscaloosa, AL	L 0–31	4,500	
October 19	at Mississippi State*	Scott Field; Starkville, MS	L 7–41	6,000	
October 26	Southwestern (TN)	Legion Field; Birmingham, AL	W 13–7		
November 1	at Chattanooga	Chamberlain Field; Chattanooga, TN	L 0–28	5,000	
November 15	at Mercer	Centennial Stadium; Macon, GA	W 14–6		
November 21	Spring Hill^{†}	Legion Field; Birmingham, AL	W 52–7	6,000	
November 27	at Millsaps	Alumni Field; Jackson, MS	W 28–14	1,000	
*Non-conference game; ^{†}Homecoming
