= 1940 Mercer Bears football team =

American college football season

1940 Mercer Bears football
- Conference: Dixie Conference
- Record: 1–7 (0–3 Dixie)
- Head coach: Lake Russell (12th season)
- Home stadium: Centennial Stadium

1940 Dixie Conference football standings
	Conf.					Overall
Team	W		L		T	W		L		T
Chattanooga +	3	–	0	–	1	7	–	1	–	1
Mississippi College +	3	–	0	–	1	5	–	1	–	1
Howard (AL)	4	–	1	–	0	4	–	5	–	0
Spring Hill	1	–	3	–	0	3	–	5	–	0
Southwestern (TN)	0	–	1	–	0	3	–	5	–	1
Millsaps	0	–	3	–	0	4	–	4	–	1
Mercer	0	–	3	–	0	1	–	7	–	0
+ – Conference co-champions

The 1940 Mercer Bears football team was an American football team that represented Mercer University as a member of the Dixie Conference during the 1940 college football season. In their twelfth year under head coach Lake Russell, the team compiled a 1–7 record.

Mercer was ranked at No. 167 (out of 697 college football teams) in the final rankings under the Litkenhous Difference by Score system for 1940.

== Schedule ==
Date	Time	Opponent	Site	Result	Attendance	Source
September 28		at Tennessee*	Shields–Watkins Field; Knoxville, TN	L 0–49	20,000	
October 5		at Alabama*	Denny Stadium; Tuscaloosa, AL	L 0–20	6,000	
October 19		at LSU*	Tiger Stadium; Baton Rouge, LA	L 0–20	10,000	
October 26		Erskine*	Centennial Stadium; Macon, GA	W 45–0	1,000	
November 1	9:00 p.m.	vs. Presbyterian*	Municipal Stadium; Albany, GA	L 2–3		
November 9		Mississippi College^{†}	Centennial Stadium; Macon, GA	L 6–26	2,500	
November 15		Howard (AL)	Centennial Stadium; Macon, GA	L 6–14		
November 28		at Chattanooga	Chamberlain Field; Chattanooga, TN	L 6–20	5,000	
*Non-conference game; ^{†}Homecoming; All times are in Eastern time
