= Chattanooga Mocs football =

Intercollegiate college football team

2026 Chattanooga Mocs football team
- First season: 1904; 122 years ago
- Head coach: Rusty Wright; 8th season, 42–34 (.553)
- Location: Chattanooga, Tennessee
- Stadium: Finley Stadium (capacity: 20,668)
- NCAA division: Division I FCS
- Conference: Southern
- Colors: Navy, old gold, and silver
- All-time record: 577–568–33 (.504)

Conference championships
- SIAA: 1926, 1927, 1928, 1929, 1931 Dixie: 1931, 1940, 1941 SoCon: 1977, 1978, 1979, 1984, 2013, 2014, 2015
- Rivalries: East Tennessee State (rivalry); Jacksonville State; Mercer; Samford
- Fight song: Fight Chattanooga
- Mascot: Scrappy
- Marching band: Marching Mocs
- Website: GoMocs.com

The Chattanooga Mocs football program is the intercollegiate college football team for the University of Tennessee at Chattanooga located in the U.S. state of Tennessee. The team competes in the NCAA Division I Football Championship Subdivision (FCS) and are members of the Southern Conference. The school's first football team was fielded in 1904. The team plays its home games at the 20,668 seat Finley Stadium. They are coached by UTC alumni, Rusty Wright. He was an assistant coach under Russ Huesman.

Hall of Fame wide receiver Terrell Owens played for the Mocs from 1992 to 1995.

== History ==
=== Classifications ===
- 1937–1955: NCAA
- 1956–1972: NCAA College Division
- 1973–1976: NCAA Division II
- 1977: NCAA Division I
- 1978–1981: NCAA Division I–A
- 1982–present: NCAA Division I–AA/FCS

=== Conference memberships ===
- 1899–1913: Independent
- 1914–1932: Southern Intercollegiate Athletic Association
- 1931–1941: Dixie Conference
- 1942–1972: Independent
- 1973–1976: NCAA Division II Independent
- 1977–present: Southern Conference

== Seasons ==
Season	Coach	Conference	Season results				Conference results			Playoffs
Season	Coach	Conference	Conference finish	Wins	Losses	Ties	Wins	Losses	Ties	Playoffs
Chattanooga Mocs
1904	Walter Hullihen	Independent		2	3	0				
1905	Walter Hullihen	Independent		6	1	0				
1906	Arthur Rieber	Independent		3	3	0				
1907	Sam McAllester	Independent		0	6	0				
1908	Jones Beene	Independent		4	4	0				
1909	W. A. Roddick	Independent		3	2	2				
1910	Leslie Stauffer	Independent		5	2	1				
1911	Leslie Stauffer	Independent		3	2	0				
1912	Leslie Stauffer	Independent		4	4	0				
1913	Leslie Stauffer	SIAA		4	3	0	1	3	0	
1914	Mike Balenti	SIAA		5	4	0	1	3	0	
1915	Johnny Spiegel	SIAA		5	2	2	1	1	1	
1916	Johnny Spiegel	SIAA		3	5	0	0	4	0	
1917	Chattanooga did not play football during the 1917 and 1918 seasons because of World War I									
1918	Chattanooga did not play football during the 1917 and 1918 seasons because of World War I									
1919	Silas Williams	SIAA		3	5	1	0	3	0	
1920	Silas Williams	SIAA		3	4	1	1	3	1	
1921	Silas Williams	SIAA		4	6	0	2	5	0	
1922	Bill McAllester	SIAA		6	2	1	3	2	1	
1923	Bill McAllester	SIAA		3	4	2	2	3	1	
1924	Bill McAllester	SIAA		1	7	1	1	5	0	
1925	Frank Thomas	SIAA		4	4	0	2	2	0	
1926	Frank Thomas	SIAA		6	2	2	4	1	0	
1927	Frank Thomas	SIAA	1st	8	1	0	4	0	0	
1928	Frank Thomas	SIAA	1st	8	2	0	8	1	0	
1929	Harold Drew	SIAA	1st	8	2	0	7	0	0	
1930	Harold Drew	SIAA		5	3	2	3	2	1	
1931	Scrappy Moore	Dixie, SIAA	1st	9	2	0	8	0	0	
1932	Scrappy Moore	Dixie, SIAA		3	6	0	2	3	0	
1933	Scrappy Moore	Dixie	8th	2	3	2	0	2	2	
1934	Scrappy Moore	Dixie	2nd	3	3	2	3	0	1	
1935	Scrappy Moore	Dixie	2nd	3	1	1	3	1	1	
1936	Scrappy Moore	Dixie	T–2nd	5	2	1	3	1	1	
1937	Scrappy Moore	Dixie	5th	4	3	2	1	3	1	
1938	Scrappy Moore	Dixie	5th	4	5	0	2	3	0	
1939	Scrappy Moore	Dixie	T–4th	5	2	1	3	1	1	
1940	Scrappy Moore	Dixie	T–1st	7	1	1	3	0	1	
1941	Scrappy Moore	Dixie	1st	7	1	1	4	0	1	
1942	Scrappy Moore	Independent		7	4	0				
1943	Chattanooga did not play football during the 1943 and 1944 seasons because of World War II									
1944	Chattanooga did not play football during the 1943 and 1944 seasons because of World War II									
1945	Scrappy Moore	Independent		5	3	0				
1946	Scrappy Moore	Independent		5	5	0				
1947	Scrappy Moore	Independent		4	6	0				
1948	Scrappy Moore	Independent		4	5	0				
1949	Scrappy Moore	Independent		5	4	0				
1950	Scrappy Moore	Independent		1	9	0				
1951	Scrappy Moore	Independent		6	5	0				
1952	Scrappy Moore	Independent		7	3	0				
1953	Scrappy Moore	Independent		3	7	0				
1954	Scrappy Moore	Independent		6	4	0				
1955	Scrappy Moore	Independent		5	4	1				
1956	Scrappy Moore	Independent		5	4	0				
1957	Scrappy Moore	Independent		4	5	1				
1958	Scrappy Moore	Independent		5	5	0				
1959	Scrappy Moore	Independent		3	7	0				
1960	Scrappy Moore	Independent		5	5	0				
1961	Scrappy Moore	Independent		4	6	0				
1962	Scrappy Moore	Independent		5	5	0				
1963	Scrappy Moore	Independent		4	6	0				
1964	Scrappy Moore	Independent		7	3	0				
1965	Scrappy Moore	Independent		5	4	1				
1966	Scrappy Moore	Independent		5	5	0				
1967	Scrappy Moore	Independent		7	3	0				
1968	Harold Wilkes	Independent		9	1	0				
1969	Harold Wilkes	Independent		4	6	0				
1970	Harold Wilkes	Independent		3	8	0				
1971	Harold Wilkes	Independent		2	9	0				
1972	Harold Wilkes	Independent		2	9	0				
1973	Joe Morrison	NCAA Division II Independent		4	7	0				
1974	Joe Morrison	NCAA Division II Independent		4	7	0				
1975	Joe Morrison	NCAA Division II Independent		5	5	1				
1976	Joe Morrison	NCAA Division II Independent		6	4	1				
1977	Joe Morrison	Southern	T–1st	9	1	1	4	1	0	—
1978	Joe Morrison	Southern	T–1st	7	3	1	4	1	0	—
1979	Joe Morrison	Southern	1st	9	2	0	5	1	0	—
1980	Bill Oliver	Southern	2nd	8	3	0	5	2	0	—
1981	Bill Oliver	Southern	5th	7	3	1	3	2	1	—
1982	Bill Oliver	Southern	2nd	7	4	0	5	1	0	—
1983	Bill Oliver	Southern	3rd	7	4	0	5	2	0	—
1984	Buddy Nix	Southern	1st	6	5	0	5	1	0	First Round — Division I-AA Playoffs
1985	Buddy Nix	Southern	3rd	6	5	0	5	2	0	—
1986	Buddy Nix	Southern	6th	4	7	0	2	4	0	—
1987	Buddy Nix	Southern	T–3rd	6	5	0	4	3	0	—
1988	Buddy Nix	Southern	5th	4	7	0	3	3	0	—
1989	Buddy Nix	Southern	5th	3	7	1	2	4	1	—
1990	Buddy Nix	Southern	3rd	6	5	0	4	2	0	—
1991	Buddy Nix	Southern	3rd	7	4	0	4	3	0	—
1992	Buddy Nix	Southern	8th	2	9	0	0	7	0	—
1993	Tommy West	Southern	8th	4	7	0	2	6	0	—
1994	Buddy Green	Southern	8th	3	8	0	2	6	0	—
1995	Buddy Green	Southern	T–7th	4	7	0	2	6	0	—
1996	Buddy Green	Southern	T–6th	3	8		2	6		—
1997	Buddy Green	Southern	6th	7	4		4	4		—
1998	Buddy Green	Southern	T5th	5	6		4	4		—
1999	Buddy Green	Southern	6th	5	6		3	5		—
2000	Donnie Kirkpatrick	Southern	T–6th	5	6		3	5		—
2001	Donnie Kirkpatrick	Southern	8th	3	8		1	7		—
2002	Donnie Kirkpatrick	Southern	T–7th	2	10		2	6		—
2003	Rodney Allison	Southern	T–6th	3	9		3	5		—
2004	Rodney Allison	Southern	T5th	2	9		2	5		—
2005	Rodney Allison	Southern	T5th	6	5		3	4		—
2006	Rodney Allison	Southern	T5th	3	8		2	5		—
2007	Rodney Allison	Southern	7th	2	9		2	5		—
2008	Rodney Allison	Southern	9th	1	11		0	8		—
2009	Russ Huesman	Southern	4th	6	5		4	4		—
2010	Russ Huesman	Southern	3rd	6	5		5	3		—
2011	Russ Huesman	Southern	T–6th	5	6		3	6		—
2012	Russ Huesman	Southern	T–4th	6	5		5	3		—
2013	Russ Huesman	Southern	T–1st	8	4		6	2		—
2014	Russ Huesman	Southern	1st	10	4		7	0		Quarterfinals — Division I FCS Playoffs
2015	Russ Huesman	Southern	T–1st	9	4		6	1		Second Round — Division I FCS Playoffs
2016	Russ Huesman	Southern	T–2nd	9	4		6	2		Second Round — Division I FCS Playoffs
2017	Tom Arth	Southern	7th	3	8		3	5		—
2018	Tom Arth	Southern	4th	6	5		4	4		—
2019	Rusty Wright	Southern	3rd	6	6		5	3		—
2020	Rusty Wright	Southern	3rd	3	2		3	1		—
2021	Rusty Wright	Southern	3rd	6	5		5	3		—
2022	Rusty Wright	Southern	3rd	7	4		5	3		—
2023	Rusty Wright	Southern	T–2nd	8	5		6	2		Second Round — Division I FCS Playoffs
2024	Rusty Wright	Southern	T–3rd	7	5		5	3		—
2025	Rusty Wright	Southern	T–5th	5	7		4	4		—

== Notable former players ==
- Hugh Beaumont
- C.J. Board
- Malcolm Carson
- Abe Cohen
- B. J. Coleman
- Aaron Grant
- Johnny Green (gridiron football)
- Tony Hill
- Spider Johnson
- Chris Jones
- Art Koeninger
- Joe Kopcha
- Corey Levin
- Derrick Lott
- Travis McNeal
- Terrell Owens
- Chris Sanders
- Terdell Sands
- Buster Skrine
- Paul Squibb
- Cole Strange
- Davis Tull
- Keionta Davis
- Kareem Orr
- Nick Tiano

== Conference championships ==
The Mocs have won 15 conference titles, 5 in the SIAA, 3 in the Dixie Conference and 7 in the Southern Conference, with seven shared and eight outright.

Year	Conference	Coach	Overall Record	Conference Record
1926†	Southern Intercollegiate Athletic Association	Frank Thomas	6–2–2	4–0–2
1927†	Southern Intercollegiate Athletic Association	Frank Thomas	8–1	5–0
1928	Southern Intercollegiate Athletic Association	Frank Thomas	8–2	8–1
1929	Southern Intercollegiate Athletic Association	Harold Drew	8–2	7–0
1931	Southern Intercollegiate Athletic Association	Scrappy Moore	9–2	8–0
1931	Dixie Conference	Scrappy Moore	9–2	4–0
1940†	Dixie Conference	Scrappy Moore	7–1–1	3–0–1
1941	Dixie Conference	Scrappy Moore	7–1–1	4–0–1
1977†	Southern Conference	Joe Morrison	9–1–1	4–1
1978†	Southern Conference	Joe Morrison	7–3–1	3–1
1979†	Southern Conference	Joe Morrison	9–2	5–1
1984	Southern Conference	Buddy Nix	6–5	6–1
2013†	Southern Conference	Russ Huesman	8–4	6–2
2014	Southern Conference	Russ Huesman	10–4	7–0
2015†	Southern Conference	Russ Huesman	9–4	6–1

† Co-champions

== Postseason ==
=== NCAA Division I-AA/FCS playoffs ===
The Mocs have made five appearances in the FCS Playoffs, with a combined record of 4–5.

Year	Round	Opponent	Result
1984	First Round	No. 10 Arkansas State	L, 10–37
2014	Second Round; Quarterfinals	No. 21 Indiana State; No. 1 New Hampshire	W, 35–14; L, 30–35
2015	First Round; Second Round	No. 17 Fordham; No. 1 Jacksonville State	W, 50–20; L, 35–41 ^{OT}
2016	First Round; Second Round	No. 23 Weber State; No. 1 Sam Houston State	W, 45–14; L, 36–41
2023	First Round; Second Round	No. 13/10 Austin Peay; No. 7/6 Furman	W, 24–21; L, 7–26

== National championships ==
The city of Chattanooga hosted the Division I-AA (now FCS) Football Championship 14 times at Finley Stadium from 1997 to 2009.

== Future non-conference opponents ==
Announced schedules as of August 25, 2026.

2026	2027	2028	2029	2030	2031	2032	2033
at West Georgia	West Georgia	Southern Illinois	at Southern Illinois	at Georgia Southern	at San Jose State	at West Georgia	at Mississippi State
at Eastern Kentucky	Eastern Kentucky	at UT Martin	at Tennessee	at UT Martin	UT Martin	at Middle Tennessee	
at Alabama	at Mississippi State	at Tennessee	UT Martin	Gardner–Webb	West Georgia		
