= Frank Grigonis =

American football player (1916–2003)

Profile
- Position: Fullback

Personal information
- Born: October 10, 1916; Calumet City, Illinois, U.S.
- Died: September 2, 2003 (aged 86); Atlanta, Georgia, U.S.
- Listed height: 5 ft 10 in (1.78 m)
- Listed weight: 190 lb (86 kg)

Career information
- College: Chattanooga

Career history
- Detroit Lions (1942)

Career statistics
- Rushing yards: 131
- Yards per carry: 3.5
- Rushing touchdowns: 1

Frank John Grigonis (October 10, 1916 – September 2, 2003) was an American football fullback.

Grigonis played college football for the Chattanooga Moccasins from 1939 to 1941. He was captain of the 1941 Chattanooga Moccasins football team, led the team with 73 points in 1941, and was selected as a first-team back on the 1941 All-Dixie Conference football team.

In 1942, he signed with the Detroit Lions of the National Football League. He appeared in 10 games for the 1942 Lions, rushed for 131 yards, scored one touchdown, and intercepted one pass.

Grigonis served in the United States Army during World War II. On October 14, 1945, Grigonis starred in an Army football game attended by Dwight Eisenhower and 20,000 soldiers in Frankfurt, Germany. Grigonis reportedly put on "a one-man show", scoring a touchdown and kicking a field goal on Eisenhower's 55th birthday.

After his discharge from the Army, Grigonis played professional football in 1946 for the Portsmouth Pirates of the Dixie League.

Grigonis and his wife, Dorothea ("Dot"), had two daughters: Janet and Susan. Grigonis died in 2003 in Atlanta. He was buried at the Chattanooga National Cemetery.
