= 1938 Loyola Wolf Pack football team =

American college football season

1938 Loyola Wolf Pack football
- Conference: Dixie Conference
- Record: 4–5 (2–1 Dixie)
- Head coach: Larry Mullins (2nd season)
- Home stadium: Loyola University Stadium

1938 Dixie Conference football standings
	Conf.					Overall
Team	W		L		T	W		L		T
Southwestern (TN) $	4	–	0	–	0	7	–	1	–	1
Mississippi College	4	–	1	–	0	7	–	2	–	0
Loyola (LA)	2	–	1	–	0	4	–	5	–	0
Howard (AL)	2	–	1	–	0	2	–	5	–	0
Chattanooga	3	–	2	–	0	4	–	5	–	0
Birmingham–Southern	4	–	3	–	0	4	–	5	–	0
Spring Hill	1	–	4	–	0	3	–	6	–	0
Mercer	0	–	3	–	0	3	–	6	–	0
Millsaps	0	–	5	–	0	1	–	10	–	0
$ – Conference champion

The 1938 Loyola Wolf Pack football team was an American football team that represented Loyola College of New Orleans (now known as Loyola University New Orleans) as a member of the Dixie Conference during the 1938 college football season. In their second season under head coach Larry Mullins, the team compiled a 4–5 record.

== Schedule ==
Date	Opponent	Site	Result	Attendance	Source
September 23	Spring Hill	Loyola University Stadium; New Orleans, LA	W 13–0		
September 30	Birmingham–Southern	Loyola University Stadium; New Orleans, LA	W 19–0		
October 7	St. Mary's (TX)*	Loyola University Stadium; New Orleans, LA	W 14–12		
October 15	at LSU*	Tiger Stadium; Baton Rouge, LA	L 6–47	10,000	
October 22	at DePaul*	Wrigley Field; Chicago, IL	W 13–0		
October 28	Southwestern (TN)	Loyola University Stadium; New Orleans, LA	L 0–21		
November 5	at Texas Tech*	Tech Field; Lubbock, TX	L 0–55	8,000	
November 13	Creighton*	Loyola University Stadium; New Orleans, LA	L 0–34	6,000	
November 20	Catholic University*	Loyola University Stadium; New Orleans, LA	L 0–14	3,000	
*Non-conference game
