= 1905 Spring Hill Badgers football team =

American college football season

1905 Spring Hill Badgers football
- Conference: Independent
- Record: 1–1

The 1905 Spring Hill Badgers football team represented the Spring Hill College as an independent during the 1905 college football season. The season was affected by a yellow fever quarantine. "As the mosquito is now pretty well under control, there is a strong probability that next year the college eleven will not be hampered by quarantine restrictions."

== Schedule ==
Date	Opponent	Site	Result
November ?	Marion		W 20–0
November ?	Fort Morgan		L 6–23
