= 1938 Chattanooga Moccasins football team =

American college football season

1938 Chattanooga Moccasins football
- Conference: Dixie Conference
- Record: 4–5 (3–2 Dixie)
- Head coach: Scrappy Moore (8th season)
- Captain: Hal Wade
- Home stadium: Chamberlain Field

1938 Dixie Conference football standings
| | Conf. | | | | | Overall |
| Team | W | | L | | T | W | | L | | T |
|---|---|---|---|---|---|---|---|---|---|---|
| Southwestern (TN) $ | 4 | – | 0 | – | 0 | 7 | – | 1 | – | 1 |
| Mississippi College | 4 | – | 1 | – | 0 | 7 | – | 2 | – | 0 |
| Loyola (LA) | 2 | – | 1 | – | 0 | 4 | – | 5 | – | 0 |
| Howard (AL) | 2 | – | 1 | – | 0 | 2 | – | 5 | – | 0 |
| Chattanooga | 3 | – | 2 | – | 0 | 4 | – | 5 | – | 0 |
| Birmingham–Southern | 4 | – | 3 | – | 0 | 4 | – | 5 | – | 0 |
| Spring Hill | 1 | – | 4 | – | 0 | 3 | – | 6 | – | 0 |
| Mercer | 0 | – | 3 | – | 0 | 3 | – | 6 | – | 0 |
| Millsaps | 0 | – | 5 | – | 0 | 1 | – | 10 | – | 0 |
$ – Conference champion

The 1938 Chattanooga Moccasins football team was an American football team that represented the University of Chattanooga (now known as the University of Tennessee at Chattanooga) in the Dixie Conference during the 1938 college football season. In its eighth year under head coach Scrappy Moore, the team compiled a 4–5 record.

== Schedule ==
| Date | Time | Opponent | Site | Result | Attendance | Source |
|---|---|---|---|---|---|---|
| September 23 | 8:00 p.m. | Tennessee Tech* | Chamberlain Field; Chattanooga, TN | W 27–6 | 4,000 | |
| October 1 | | at Centre* | Farris Stadium; Danville, KY | L 7–16 | | |
| October 7 | | Mississippi College | Chamberlain Field; Chattanooga, TN | W 28–25 | | |
| October 14 | | Southwestern (TN) | Chamberlain Field; Chattanooga, TN | L 6–12 | 4,689 | |
| October 21 | | Howard (AL)^{†} | Chamberlain Field; Chattanooga, TN | W 13–6 | 3,900 | |
| October 28 | | vs. Birmingham–Southern | Murphree Stadium; Gadsden, AL | L 6–12 | 3,500 | |
| November 5 | | at No. 6 Tennessee* | Shields–Watkins Field; Knoxville, TN | L 0–45 | 7,500 | |
| November 12 | | at Army* | Michie Stadium; West Point, NY | L 13–34 | 12,000 | |
| November 24 | | Mercer | Chamberlain Field; Chattanooga, TN | W 9–7 | 4,200 | |
*Non-conference game; ^{†}Homecoming; Rankings from AP Poll released prior to the game; All times are in Eastern time
