= Ben Smith (end) =

American football player (1911–1941)

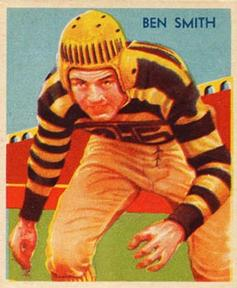

No. 38
- Position: End

Personal information
- Born: June 16, 1911; Haleyville, Alabama, U.S.
- Died: February 23, 1941 (aged 29); Mobile Bay, Alabama, U.S.
- Listed height: 6 ft 3 in (1.91 m)
- Listed weight: 208 lb (94 kg)

Career information
- High school: Haleyville (AL)
- College: Alabama

Career history
- Green Bay Packers (1933); Pittsburgh Pirates (1934–1935); Pittsburgh Americans (1936); Washington Redskins (1937)

Awards and highlights
- NFL champion (1937)
- Stats at Pro Football Reference

Benjamin Harris Smith Jr. (June 16, 1911 – February 23, 1941) was an American football end in the National Football League (NFL) for the Green Bay Packers, the Pittsburgh Pirates, and the Washington Redskins. He played college football at the University of Alabama.

Smith worked as an assistant coach for his brother, Earle Smith, at Spring Hill College in 1938. He disappeared on February 23, 1941, while on a fishing trip. His body was discovered 22 days later, on March 17, floating in the Tensaw River near Mobile, Alabama.
