= 1941 Chattanooga Moccasins football team =

American college football season

1941 Chattanooga Moccasins football

Dixie champion
- Conference: Dixie Conference
- Record: 7–1–1 (4–0–1 Dixie)
- Head coach: Scrappy Moore (11th season)
- Captain: Frank Grigonis
- Home stadium: Chamberlain Field

1941 Dixie Conference football standings
| | Conf. | | | | | Overall |
| Team | W | | L | | T | W | | L | | T |
|---|---|---|---|---|---|---|---|---|---|---|
| Chattanooga $ | 4 | – | 0 | – | 1 | 7 | – | 1 | – | 1 |
| Howard (AL) | 2 | – | 0 | – | 1 | 4 | – | 5 | – | 1 |
| Mississippi College | 3 | – | 1 | – | 0 | 5 | – | 3 | – | 0 |
| Millsaps | 1 | – | 1 | – | 0 | 4 | – | 5 | – | 0 |
| Southwestern (TN) | 0 | – | 1 | – | 0 | 4 | – | 4 | – | 1 |
| Mercer | 0 | – | 3 | – | 0 | 3 | – | 6 | – | 0 |
| Spring Hill | 0 | – | 4 | – | 0 | 2 | – | 6 | – | 0 |
$ – Conference champion

The 1941 Chattanooga Moccasins football team was an American football team that represented the University of Chattanooga as a member of the Dixie Conference during the 1941 college football season. In its 11th year under head coach Scrappy Moore, the team compiled a 7–1–1 (4–0–1 against conference opponents), outscored opponents by a total of 209 to 62, and won the Dixie Conference championship.

Fullback Frank Grigonis was the team captain. He played for the Detroit Lions of the National Football League in 1942. Chattanooga players took five of the eleven first-team places on the 1941 All-Dixie Conference football team selected by the Chattanooga News-Press: backs Grigonis and Sib Evans; tackle Tom Barber; guard Slug Burney; and center J.D. Langley.

Chattanooga was ranked at No. 84 (out of 681 teams) in the final rankings under the Litkenhous Difference by Score System for 1941.

The team played its home games at Chamberlain Field in Chattanooga, Tennessee.

== Schedule ==
| Date | Opponent | Site | Result | Attendance | Source |
|---|---|---|---|---|---|
| September 26 | Tennessee Tech* | Chamberlain Field; Chattanooga, TN | W 26–9 | 4,567 | |
| October 4 | at Georgia Tech* | Grant Field; Atlanta, GA | L 0–20 | 10,000 | |
| October 11 | Mississippi College | Chamberlain Field; Chattanooga, TN | W 26–6 | | |
| October 17 | at Howard (AL) | Memorial Stadium; Anniston, AL | T 7–7 | 5,000 | |
| October 24 | Southwestern (TN) | Chamberlain Field; Chattanooga, TN | W 7–0 | 4,632 | |
| October 31 | Spring Hill | Chamberlain Field; Chattanooga, TN | W 49–0 | 1,750 | |
| November 8 | at Centre* | Farris Stadium; Danville, KY | W 27–7 | | |
| November 15 | Sewanee* | Chamberlain Field; Chattanooga, TN | W 27–0 | | |
| November 27 | Mercer | Chamberlain Field; Chattanooga, TN | W 40–13 | 3,988 | |
*Non-conference game
