= Lake Russell (coach) =

American football coach

Biographical details
- Born: April 6, 1898
- Died: December 26, 1980 (aged 82); McMinnville, Tennessee, U.S.

Coaching career (HC unless noted)

Football
- 1924–1928: Carson–Newman
- 1929–1940: Mercer
- 1949–1953: Miami Beach Senior HS (FL) (assistant)
- 1954: Miami Beach Senior HS (FL)

Basketball
- 1929–1930: Mercer
- 1932–1934: Mercer
- 1936–1939: Mercer

Administrative career (AD unless noted)
- 1931–1941: Mercer

Head coaching record
- Overall: 62–82–8 (college football)

Lake F. Russell (April 6, 1898 – December 26, 1980) was an American football and basketball coach. He served as the head football coach at Carson–Newman College from 1924 to 1928 and compiled a record of 16–20–3. After leaving Carson–Newman, Russell coached at Mercer University from 1929 to 1940 and compiled a record of 46–61–5. He also served as head men's basketball coach at Mercer from 1929 to 1930, from 1932 to 1934 and again from 1936 to 1939.

Serving as an assistant coach since 1949, Russell was named head coach in 1954 at Miami Beach Senior High School in Miami Beach, Florida. He served as head coach at Miami Beach through August 1955 when he resigned to become the superintendent of the State Training & Agricultural School in Nashville, Tennessee.

A native of Ducktown, Tennessee, Russell graduated from Carson–Newman in 1925. He died on December 26, 1980, at River Park Hospital in McMinnville, Tennessee.

== Head coaching record ==
=== College football ===
Year	Team	Overall	Conference	Standing	Bowl/playoffs
Carson–Newman Parsons (Independent) (1924–1926)
1924	Carson–Newman	6–2			
1925	Carson–Newman	2–3–2			
1926	Carson–Newman	5–2			
Carson–Newman Parsons (Smoky Mountain Conference) (1927–1928)
1927	Carson–Newman	2–8	1–4	5th	
1928	Carson–Newman	1–6–1	0–4–1	6th	
Carson–Newman:		16–21–3	1–8–1		
Mercer Bears (Southern Intercollegiate Athletic Association) (1929–1930)
1929	Mercer	2–7	2–5	26th	
1930	Mercer	5–5	3–2	T–11th	
Mercer Bears (Dixie Conference / Southern Intercollegiate Athletic Association) (1931–1936)
1931	Mercer	7–2–1	1–2 / 6–2	8th / T–7th	
1932	Mercer	7–2	3–0 / 4–1	1st / T–7th	
1933	Mercer	4–3–2	2–0–1 / 0–0–1	T–2nd / T–29th	
1934	Mercer	3–6–1	0–2–1 / 1–4	8th / T–25th	
1935	Mercer	4–5	1–1 / 1–1	T–4th / T–15th	
1936	Mercer	3–6–1	0–2–1 / 1–1–1	8th / T–18th	
Mercer Bears (Dixie Conference) (1937–1940)
1937	Mercer	4–5	0–3	8th	
1938	Mercer	3–6	0–3	8th	
1939	Mercer	3–7	1–3	8th	
1940	Mercer	1–7	0–3	T–6th	
Mercer:		46–61–5			
Total:		62–82–8			
National championship Conference title Conference division title or championship game berth
