= 1940 Chattanooga Moccasins football team =

American college football season

1940 Chattanooga Moccasins football

Dixie co-champion
- Conference: Dixie Conference
- Record: 7–1–1 (3–0–1 Dixie)
- Head coach: Scrappy Moore (10th season)
- Captain: Roy Scruggs
- Home stadium: Chamberlain Field

1940 Dixie Conference football standings
	Conf.					Overall
Team	W		L		T	W		L		T
Chattanooga +	3	–	0	–	1	7	–	1	–	1
Mississippi College +	3	–	0	–	1	5	–	1	–	1
Howard (AL)	4	–	1	–	0	4	–	5	–	0
Spring Hill	1	–	3	–	0	3	–	5	–	0
Southwestern (TN)	0	–	1	–	0	3	–	5	–	1
Millsaps	0	–	3	–	0	4	–	4	–	1
Mercer	0	–	3	–	0	1	–	7	–	0
+ – Conference co-champions

The 1940 Chattanooga Moccasins football team was an American football team that represented the University of Chattanooga (now known as the University of Tennessee at Chattanooga) in the Dixie Conference during the 1940 college football season. In its tenth year under head coach Scrappy Moore, the team compiled a 7–1–1 record.

Chattanooga was ranked at No. 78 (out of 697 college football teams) in the final rankings under the Litkenhous Difference by Score system for 1940.

== Schedule ==
Date	Time	Opponent	Site	Result	Attendance	Source
September 27	8:00 p.m.	Tennessee Tech*	Chamberlain Field; Chattanooga, TN	W 28–0	4,906	
October 4		Mississippi College	Chamberlain Field; Chattanooga, TN	T 7–7		
October 12		at Tennessee*	Shields–Watkins Field; Knoxville, TN	L 0–53	12,000	
October 18		Maryville (TN)*	Chamberlain Field; Chattanooga, TN	W 28–0		
October 25		Sewanee*	Chamberlain Field; Chattanooga, TN	W 20–6	4,424	
November 1		Howard (AL)	Chamberlain Field; Chattanooga, TN	W 28–0	5,000	
November 9		Centre*	Chamberlain Field; Chattanooga, TN	W 14–9	4,000	
November 15		at Spring Hill	Dorn Stadium; Mobile, AL	W 34–6		
November 28		Mercer	Chamberlain Field; Chattanooga, TN	W 20–6	5,000	
*Non-conference game; All times are in Central time
