= 1938 Southwestern Lynx football team =

American college football season

1938 Southwestern Lynx football

Dixie champion
- Conference: Dixie Conference
- Record: 7–1–1 (4–0 Dixie)
- Head coach: Ed Kubale (1st season)
- Home stadium: Crump Stadium

1938 Dixie Conference football standings
| | Conf. | | | | | Overall |
| Team | W | | L | | T | W | | L | | T |
|---|---|---|---|---|---|---|---|---|---|---|
| Southwestern (TN) $ | 4 | – | 0 | – | 0 | 7 | – | 1 | – | 1 |
| Mississippi College | 4 | – | 1 | – | 0 | 7 | – | 2 | – | 0 |
| Loyola (LA) | 2 | – | 1 | – | 0 | 4 | – | 5 | – | 0 |
| Howard (AL) | 2 | – | 1 | – | 0 | 2 | – | 5 | – | 0 |
| Chattanooga | 3 | – | 2 | – | 0 | 4 | – | 5 | – | 0 |
| Birmingham–Southern | 4 | – | 3 | – | 0 | 4 | – | 5 | – | 0 |
| Spring Hill | 1 | – | 4 | – | 0 | 3 | – | 6 | – | 0 |
| Mercer | 0 | – | 3 | – | 0 | 3 | – | 6 | – | 0 |
| Millsaps | 0 | – | 5 | – | 0 | 1 | – | 10 | – | 0 |
$ – Conference champion

The 1938 Southwestern Lynx football team was an American football team that represented Southwestern, The College of the Mississippi Valley (now known as Rhodes College) as a member of the Dixie Conference in the 1938 college football season. Led by Ed Kubale in his first season as head coach, the team compiled an overall record of 7–1–1, with a mark of 4–0 in conference play, and finished as Dixie champion.

== Schedule ==
| Date | Opponent | Site | Result | Attendance | Source |
|---|---|---|---|---|---|
| September 23 | at Union (TN)* | Rothrock Field; Jackson, TN | W 47–0 | 6,000 | |
| September 30 | Sewanee* | Crump Stadium; Memphis, TN (rivalry) | W 47–0 | 10,000 | |
| October 8 | Centenary* | Crump Stadium; Memphis, TN | L 0–6 | | |
| October 14 | at Chattanooga | Chamberlain Field; Chattanooga, TN | W 12–6 | 4,689 | |
| October 22 | Birmingham–Southern | Crump Stadium; Memphis, TN | W 46–7 | | |
| October 28 | at Loyola (LA) | Loyola University Stadium; New Orleans, LA | W 21–0 | | |
| November 4 | at Murray State* | Cutchin Stadium; Murray, KY | T 6–6 | | |
| November 12 | Millsaps | Crump Stadium; Memphis, TN | W 42–0 | 5,000 | |
| November 19 | Mississippi State* | Crump Stadium; Memphis, TN | W 7–3 | 12,000 | |
*Non-conference game
