= Billy Bancroft (coach) =

American sports coach (1904–1993)

Biographical details
- Born: August 25, 1904; Livingston, Alabama, U.S.
- Died: December 6, 1993 (aged 89); Birmingham, Alabama, U.S.

Playing career

Football
- 1924–1927: Howard (AL)

Baseball
- 1928: Montgomery Lions
- 1929: Spartanburg Spartans
- 1930–1933: Birmingham Barons
- 1934–1935: Oklahoma City Indians
- 1939: Selma Cloverleafs
- 1940: Gadsden Pilots
- Positions: Second baseman, third baseman (baseball)

Coaching career (HC unless noted)

Football
- 1935–1939: Howard (AL)
- 1946–1957: Anniston HS (AL)

Basketball
- 1934–1938: Howard (AL)

Baseball
- 1936–1939: Howard (AL)
- ?–1958: Anniston HS (AL)

Administrative career (AD unless noted)
- 1934–1940: Howard (AL)

Head coaching record
- Overall: 22–18–4 (college football); 50–37 (college basketball); 4–5 (college baseball)

Accomplishments and honors

Championships
- Football; 2 Dixie (1935–1936)

William Henry Bancroft (August 25, 1904 – December 6, 1993) was an American college football, basketball and baseball coach. He served as the head football coach at Howard College—now known as Samford University—from 1935 to 1939. Bancroft died on December 6, 1993, in Birmingham, Alabama.

== Head coaching record ==
=== College football ===
Year	Team	Overall	Conference	Standing	Bowl/playoffs
Howard Bulldogs (Dixie Conference / Southern Intercollegiate Athletic Association) (1935–1938)
1935	Howard	7–1–2	3–0–1 / 5–0–1	1st / 2nd	
1936	Howard	5–3–1	4–1–1 / 2–0–1	1st / T–4th	
1937	Howard	5–3	4–1 / 0–0	T–2nd / NA	
1938	Howard	2–5	2–1 / 0–2	T–3rd / T–27th	
Howard Bulldogs (Dixie Conference) (1939)
1939	Howard	3–6–1	2–3–1	T–6th	
Howard:		22–18–4	19–8–3		
Total:		22–18–4			
