= Bobby Hooks =

American football player and coach (1907–1969)

Biographical details
- Born: March 13, 1907; Americus, Georgia, U.S.
- Died: April 7, 1969 (aged 62); Macon, Georgia, U.S.

Playing career
- 1926–1928: Georgia
- Position: Halfback

Coaching career (HC unless noted)
- 1930–1931: Georgia Military
- 1932–1940: Valdosta HS (GA)
- 1941: Mercer

Head coaching record
- Overall: 3–6 (college); 66–15–5 (high school)

Accomplishments and honors

Championships
- Georgia state (1940)

Awards
- All-Southern (1927)

Robert Greene Hooks (March 13, 1907 – April 7, 1969) was an American football player and coach. He was a halfback for the Georgia Bulldogs, a member of its 1927 "Dream and Wonder" team. Against Yale, he threw a 59-yard touchdown pass to Frank Dudley. He was selected All-Southern by football fans of the South through Central Press newspapers. One of the “Four Horsemen” of Georgia - Hooks, Dudley, McCrary and Johnson. He later coached the Mercer Bears. In 1964, he was elected to the State of Georgia Athletic Hall of Fame.

== Head coaching record ==
=== College ===
Year	Team	Overall	Conference	Standing	Bowl/playoffs
Mercer Bears (Dixie Conference) (1941)
1941	Mercer	3–6	0–3	6th	
Mercer:		3–6	0–3		
Total:		3–6			
