= Scrappy Moc =

College Mascot

Scrappy
- University: University of Tennessee at Chattanooga
- Conference: SoCon
- Description: Anthropomorphic Northern mockingbird
- Origin of name: A.C. "Scrappy" Moore
- First seen: 1997

Scrappy is the mascot of the University of Tennessee at Chattanooga, located in Chattanooga, Tennessee. He is an anthropomorphic northern mockingbird, the state bird of Tennessee. Scrappy is named after the legendary, former Chattanooga football coach, A.C. "Scrappy" Moore.

== History ==
Chattanooga was formerly the "Moccasins", named after nearby Moccasin Bend. Several identities have been associated with UTC. A water moccasin mascot was used in the 1920s. A Native American mascot, "Chief Moccanooga", was used until 1996. There was a short time in the 1980s when a moccasin shoe was used as the mascot. Due to politically sensitive issues, it was decided to drop the use of Native American imagery. The nickname "Moccasins" was shortened to "Mocs" and the state bird was selected as mascot. The primary logo was Scrappy at the throttle of a steam locomotive from 1997 until 2007. This tied in with Chattanooga's history as a major railroad hub. Scrappy underwent a re-design in 2008 to better match the appearance of a Northern mockingbird, and dropped the railroad imagery at the same time. Scrappy has remained the same since 2008, other than a few minor alterations. In 2009, Scrappy appeared on Late Night with Jimmy Fallon prior to the 2009 NCAA Division I men's basketball tournament. In 2016, Scrappy was named the MascotInsider College Mascot of the Year. Scrappy competed for the first time in the Universal Cheerleader's Association National Championships in 2018 at the ESPN Wide World of Sports Complex located at the Walt Disney World Resort. He competed in the Open Gameday category along with the UTC Spirit Squad, and they would be awarded 1st place in the nation and 2nd place overall.

== Known performers ==
- Mitch Reburn
- Tyler Hickerson (2012–2016)
- Zachary Langley (2014–2018)
- Ty Myers
- Jaden Partain
- Jackson Schneider
