= 1941 Mercer Bears football team =

American college football season

1941 Mercer Bears football
- Conference: Dixie Conference
- Record: 3–6 (0–3 Dixie)
- Head coach: Bobby Hooks (1st season)
- Home stadium: Centennial Stadium

1941 Dixie Conference football standings
	Conf.					Overall
Team	W		L		T	W		L		T
Chattanooga $	4	–	0	–	1	7	–	1	–	1
Howard (AL)	2	–	0	–	1	4	–	5	–	1
Mississippi College	3	–	1	–	0	5	–	3	–	0
Millsaps	1	–	1	–	0	4	–	5	–	0
Southwestern (TN)	0	–	1	–	0	4	–	4	–	1
Mercer	0	–	3	–	0	3	–	6	–	0
Spring Hill	0	–	4	–	0	2	–	6	–	0
$ – Conference champion

The 1941 Mercer Bears football team was an American football team that represented Mercer University as a member of the Dixie Conference during the 1941 college football season. Led by Bobby Hooks in his first and only season as head coach, the Bears compiled an overall record of 3–6 with a mark of 0–3 in conferenced play, placing sixth in the Dixie Conference.

== Schedule ==
Date	Time	Opponent	Site	Result	Attendance	Source
September 27		Georgia*	Centennial Stadium; Macon, GA	L 0–81	12,000	
October 11	8:15 p.m.	Georgia Teachers*	Porter Field; Macon, GA	W 25–0	1,000	
October 18		Wofford*	Centennial Stadium; Macon, GA	W 20–14		
October 24		at Rollins*	Orlando Stadium; Orlando, FL	L 0–52	3,000	
November 1		Presbyterian*	Centennial Stadium; Macon, GA	W 19–12		
November 8		at Mississippi College	Provine Field; Clinton, MS	L 19–27		
November 14		at Newberry*	Setzler Field; Newberry, SC	L 13–32		
November 20		at Howard (AL)	Legion Field; Birmingham, AL	L 6–27	2,500	
November 17		at Chattanooga	Chamberlain Field; Chattanooga, TN	L 13–40	3,988	
*Non-conference game; All times are in Eastern time
