= 1937 Birmingham–Southern Panthers football team =

American college football season

1937 Birmingham–Southern Panthers football

Dixie champion
- Conference: Dixie Conference
- Record: 6–2 (6–1 Dixie)
- Head coach: Jenks Gillem (10th season)

1937 Dixie Conference football standings
	Conf.					Overall
Team	W		L		T	W		L		T
Birmingham–Southern $	6	–	1	–	0	6	–	2	–	0
Howard (AL)	4	–	1	–	0	5	–	3	–	0
Southwestern (TN)	4	–	1	–	0	6	–	4	–	0
Mississippi College	2	–	1	–	1	3	–	6	–	1
Chattanooga	2	–	3	–	0	4	–	3	–	2
Loyola (LA)	1	–	2	–	0	2	–	6	–	1
Millsaps	1	–	3	–	1	3	–	5	–	2
Mercer	0	–	3	–	0	4	–	5	–	0
Spring Hill	0	–	5	–	0	1	–	10	–	0
$ – Conference champion

The 1937 Birmingham–Southern Panthers football team was an American football team that represented Birmingham–Southern College as a member of the Dixie Conference during the 1937 college football season. In their tenth season under head coach Jenks Gillem, the team compiled a 6–2 record.

== Schedule ==
Date	Opponent	Site	Result	Attendance	Source
September 24	at Auburn*	Cramton Bowl; Montgomery, AL	L 0–19	15,000	
October 8	at Loyola (LA)	Loyola University Stadium; New Orleans, LA	W 14–0	3,500	
October 15	vs. Mercer	Memorial Stadium; Columbus, GA	W 7–0		
October 22	Southwestern (TN)	Legion Field; Birmingham, AL	L 7–26		
October 29	at Millsaps	Tiger Stadium; Jackson, MS	W 12–7		
November 6	at Chattanooga	Chamberlain Field; Chattanooga, TN	W 19–18	3,100	
November 12	Spring Hill	Legion Field; Birmingham, AL	W 38–0	1,000	
November 25	vs. Howard (AL)	Legion Field; Birmingham, AL	W 21–20		
*Non-conference game
