= Mercer Bears football =

Football program representing Mercer University

Mercer Bears
2026 Mercer Bears football team
- First season: 1891; 135 years ago (Note: The first fielded team played from 1891 to 1941, then folded. Program was relaunched in the 2013 season; 13 years ago.)
- Athletic director: Jim Cole
- Head coach: Joel Taylor; 1st season, 5–2 (.714)
- Location: Macon, Georgia
- Stadium: Five Star Stadium (capacity: 10,200)
- NCAA division: Division I FCS
- Conference: Southern
- Colors
- All-time record: 211–228–14 (.481)

Conference championships
- SoCon: 2024, 2025, 2026
- Rivalries: Furman; Samford
- Mascot: Toby
- Website: MercerBears.com

The Mercer Bears football program is the intercollegiate football team of Mercer University located in Macon, Georgia, United States. The team competes in the NCAA Division I Football Championship Subdivision (FCS) and is a member of the Southern Conference. The team plays its home games at the 10,200-seat Five Star Stadium on the university's Macon campus.

== History ==
Mercer's first football team was fielded in 1891, but the school did not consistently field teams until 1906. The sport was dropped in 1917 and 1918 during U.S. involvement in World War I, but returned after the war. Until 1924, the Mercer Bears were known as the Mercer Baptists. After the 1941 season, with the beginning of U.S. involvement in World War II, Mercer dropped football again, but did not resume the sport after the war. The program was reinstated after a 72-year hiatus in 2013; the first game was on August 31, 2013, when Mercer defeated (40–37) Reinhardt University in front of an overflow crowd of 12,172 at the Moye Complex.

Mercer football became nationally ranked in the FCS Coaches Poll in 2022. The Bears stayed within the FCS Coaches Poll rankings through the entire 2022 season, and reached as high as 11th in both the FCS Coaches Poll and FCS STATS Perform Poll.

The rankings streak continued through the first four games of 2023. Mercer fell outside of the rankings after losing to Furman, but would eventually join back in after an upset win at Western Carolina. Mercer finished 8–3 in 2023 and obtained a program-high eight wins against Division I opponents in their 2023 campaign, helping pave the way to the Bears' first-ever FCS playoff berth.

== Conference affiliations ==
- Independent (1891–1895)
- Southern Intercollegiate Athletic Association (1896–1937)
- Dixie Conference (1931–1941)
- No program (1942–2012)
- Pioneer Football League (2013)
- Southern Conference (2014–present)

== Conference championships ==
Mercer has won three conference championships.

Year	Conference	Coach	Overall Record	Conference Record
2024	Southern Conference	Mike Jacobs	10–2	7–1
2025	Southern Conference	Mike Jacobs	9–3	8–0
2026	Southern Conference	Joel Taylor	10–2	7–1

† Co-champions

== Notable former players ==
The first secretary of the Vacation Bible School Department of Nashville's Baptist Sunday School Department (now Lifeway) was Homer Grice, a prominent Mercer player. Georgia Tech player and later Hall of Fame coach Bill Alexander called Grice "the meanest and toughest guy I ever ran across on a gridiron."

Brothers Crook Smith and Phoney Smith were both stars for Mercer.

Famous University of Georgia football coach Wally Butts, who led UGA to four Southeastern Conference titles and two National Championships, played end for Mercer from 1925 to 1928.

Les Olsson, known around Mercer as "Swede," was the only Mercer player from the pre-World War II era to go pro, playing for the Washington Redskins from 1934 to 1938. He was part of the 1937 championship squad.

== Year-by-year results ==
On August 31, 2013, Mercer played its first game since 1941 before an overflow crowd of 12,172 spectators. The Bears' opponent, Reinhardt University, also revived its football program, having last played in 1920. In a thrilling game that saw multiple lead changes, Josh Shutter helped Mercer clinch the victory with a 31-yard field goal with three seconds left in the game. Mercer won 40–37.

== Playoff appearances ==
=== NCAA Division I-AA/FCS ===
The Bears have appeared in the I-AA/FCS playoffs three times, with a combined record of 2–3.

Year	Round	Opponent	Result
2023	First Round; Second Round	Gardner–Webb; South Dakota State	W, 17–7; L, 0–41
2024	Second Round; Quarterfinals	Rhode Island; North Dakota State	W, 17–10; L, 7–31
2025	Second Round	South Dakota	L, 0–47

== Future non-conference opponents ==
Announced schedules as of October 5, 2026.

2027	2028
at Alabama	at Georgia Tech
