= Spring Hill Badgers football =

Spring Hill Badgers
- First season: 1901; 124 years ago
- Stadium: Maxon Field
- Location: Mobile, Alabama
- Colors: Purple and White

The Spring Hill Badgers football team represents the Spring Hill College in Mobile, Alabama. The school's teams are known as the Badgers. They have not competed in football since 1941.

== History ==
The Spring Hill football team played its first game in 1901 against Fort Morgan. T. Semmes Walmsley was quarterback on the 1906 team. Moon Ducote was the varsity team's fullback from 1912 to 1914, and the team's coach from 1919 to 1922. Hall of Fame coach Mike Donahue led the 1934 team.
