= Dixie Conference =

American collegiate athletic leagues

The Dixie Conference was the name of two collegiate athletic leagues in the United States. The first operated from 1930 until the United States' entry into World War II in 1942. The second conference to use the name existed from 1948 to 1954.

== Dixie Conference (1930) ==
=== Formation and relationship with the SIAA ===
At the Southern Intercollegiate Athletic Association (SIAA) annual convention in 1930, nine of the association's members announced the formation of the Dixie Conference to facilitate scheduling of games among the group. The charter members were Birmingham-Southern College, Howard College (now Samford University), Southwestern of Memphis (now Rhodes College), Centre College, University of Chattanooga (now the University of Tennessee at Chattanooga), Spring Hill College and Mercer University; Loyola University New Orleans joined the Dixie two years later.

At the time of formation, conference president Dean G. W. Meade of Birmingham-Southern stated, "We are still members of the S. I. A. A. and will continue to be so." However, at the SIAA convention the following year, Birmingham-Southern, Howard and Spring Hill resigned from the association. University officials at Chattanooga announced their resignation from the SIAA in 1932, explaining that they "saw no purpose in remaining in the unwieldy association after successful launching of the Dixie Conference two years ago".

Two years prior to the SIAA, the Dixie Conference approved the use of scholarships in 1936.

=== Football champions ===
List of conference football champions by year:

Year	Champion
1931	Chattanooga
1932	Birmingham Southern
1933	Howard (AL)
1934	Birmingham–Southern
1935	Howard (AL)
1936	Howard (AL)
1937	Birmingham–Southern
1938	Southwestern (TN)
1939	Loyola (LA)
1940	Chattanooga and Mississippi College
1941	Chattanooga

=== Reduction then dissolution ===
After a university planning committee recommendation to either drop competitive football or to compete at the "big time" level, on June 3, 1939, Birmingham-Southern announced that it was ending its football program in favor of an enlarged intramural athletic program. Loyola followed suit the following December and also dropped football from the University's athletic program. The remaining slate of Dixie Conference membership lasted until the American entry into World War II, when several league schools suspended athletics.

== Dixie Conference (1948) ==
=== Formation of purely amateur conference ===
In 1948, the administration of Florida State University, which had returned to coeducation in 1947 after more than 40 years as a women's college, wrote leaders at other southern institutions seeking to create a "purely amateur" athletic conference. The NCAA had recently tightened its rules on the amount of money that could be paid to collegiate athletes, which caused difficulty for many established athletic programs. Florida State hoped to create a new conference based on the principle of complete amateurism, including no athletic scholarships.

The original Dixie Conference lineup included, in addition to Florida State, Howard College (now Samford University) from Alabama, Stetson University and the University of Tampa from Florida, Lambuth College from Tennessee, Mercer University and Oglethorpe University from Georgia, and Millsaps College and Mississippi College from Mississippi. Of the nine charter members, six (FSU, Howard, Millsaps, Mississippi, Stetson, and Tampa) played football.

=== Membership transitions ===
In 1949, Lambuth, Stetson and Tampa left the conference, while Florida Southern College joined. In December 1950, after winning the first three Dixie football titles without losing a single conference game, founding member Florida State withdrew to become an independent and began offering scholarships.

=== 1951–1954 ===
In the four years following the departure of Florida State, Millsaps won three conference football titles and Mississippi College won one. Citing "operation difficulties and limited competition between members", the league disbanded in December 1954 following the resignation of Howard, Millsaps and Mississippi College.
