= List of crossings of the Kanawha and New Rivers =

This is a complete list of current bridges and other crossings of the Kanawha River, and its continuation the New River, from its mouth at the Ohio River to the split between the North and South Forks of the New River. Pedestrian-only bridges are marked in italics.

== West Virginia ==
Image	Crossing	Location	Opened	Coordinates	Notes
Mason County
	Bartow Jones Bridge; WV 2	Henderson–Point Pleasant	1999	38.8373°N 82.1395°W	Replaced Shadle Bridge built in 1930
	CSX Transportation Ohio River Subdivision	Henderson–Point Pleasant	1947		Replaced earlier bridge opened in 1888
Putnam County
	Johnathon David Higginbotham Memorial Bridge; WV 869	Fraziers Bottom–Buffalo	1998	38.5821°N 81.9991°W	
	Winfield Locks and Dam	Winfield–Eleanor	1937		
	Ross Booth Memorial Bridge; WV 34	Winfield–Eleanor	1955	38.5351°N 81.8985°W	
	Nitro WWI Memorial Bridge; I-64	Teays Valley–Nitro	2022	38.4453°N 81.8424°W	Carries westbound lanes of I-64. Carried both directions while the Donald M. Legg Memorial Bridge was demolished and rebuilt between 2022 and 2024.
	Donald M. Legg Memorial Bridge; I-64	Teays Valley–Nitro	2024	38.4452°N 81.8427°W	Replaced earlier bridge span with the same name opened in 1962.
Kanawha County
	Richard J. "Dick" Henderson Memorial Bridge; WV 25 (3rd Street / Center Street)	St. Albans–Nitro	2013	38.3918°N 81.8320°W	Replaced earlier bridge of same name opened in 1934
	Dunbar Toll Bridge; CR 2547	South Charleston–Dunbar	1953		
	I-64	South Charleston–Dunbar	1974, 2010	38.3615°N 81.7189°W	2010 span is the longest concrete box girder span in the U.S.
	Patrick Street Bridge; US 60 (Patrick Street)	Charleston	1930	38.3659°N 81.6688°W	
	CSX Kanawha Railroad Bridge	Charleston	1907		
	Eugene A. Carter Memorial Bridge; I-64 / US 119	Charleston	1975	38.3555°N 81.6483°W	
	South Side Bridge	Charleston	1936		Replaced earlier bridge opened in 1891
	35th Street Bridge; CR 6063	Charleston	1975, 1976		Replaced Kanawha City Bridge opened in 1914
	Chuck Yeager Memorial Bridge; I-64 / I-77 (West Virginia Turnpike)	Charleston–Coal Fork	1954, 1983	38.3097°N 81.5613°W	
	Fishing–Marmet Locks and Dam	Marmet–Dupont City	1934		
	Admiral T. J. Lopez Bridge	Chelyan–Dickenson	1997		Replaced Chelyan Bridge opened in 1929
	London Locks and Dam	Handley–London	1934		
Fayette County
	Earl M. Vickers Bridge; WV 6	Montgomery	1956	38.1827°N 81.3167°W	Replaced Montgomery Bridge
	Norfolk Southern Railway Princeton–Deepwater District	Deep Water–Falls View	1931		
	Deepwater–Cotton Hill Bridge; CR 13	Kanawha Falls	1928		Closed in 2018 due to structural damage with no plans to repair
Kanawha River becomes New River
	CSX Gauley Subdivision				
	WV 16 (Beckwith Road)	Beckwith–Chimney Corner	1999	38.1140°N 81.1434°W	
	Hawks Nest Dam	Hawks Nest			
	CSX New River Subdivision (#1 Main)	Hawks Nest			
	New River Gorge Bridge; US 19	Fayetteville–Lansing	1977	38.0690°N 81.0827°W	
	Tunney Hunsaker Bridge; CR 82		1997		
	CSX New River Subdivision (#2 Main)				
	CR 252 (Thurmond Road) / R.J. Corman Railroad West Virginia Line	Thurmond	1916		
	CR 25 (McKendree Road)	Stone Cliff	1928		
Raleigh County–Fayette County
	Thomas Burford Pugh Memorial Bridge; WV 41 (Stanaford Road)	Prince	2015	37.8540°N 81.0714°W	
	CSX Piney Creek Subdivision	Prince			
Raleigh County–Summers County
	Mary Draper Ingles Bridge; I-64	Sandstone	1982	37.7811°N 80.9008°W	
Summers County
	Hinton Bridge; WV 20 (Temple Street)	Brooklin–Hinton	1975	37.6727°N 80.8943°W	
	Veterans Memorial Bridge; WV 3	Bellepoint	2004	37.6511°N 80.8866°W	
	Bluestone Dam	Bellepoint			

== Virginia and North Carolina ==
All locations are in Virginia unless otherwise specified

Image	Crossing	Location	Opened	Coordinates	Notes
Giles County
	US 460 (Virginia Avenue)	Glen Lyn	1969, 1986	37.3726°N 80.8624°W	
	Virginian Railway bridge (ruined)	Glen Lyn		37.3703°N 80.8556°W	
	SR 61 (MacArthur Lane)	Narrows	2013	37.3345°N 80.8091°W	
	NS Whitethorne District	Narrows		37.3387°N 80.7919°W	
	US 460 (Virginia Avenue)	Pearisburg	1978, 2001	37.3403°N 80.7580°W	
	NS railroad bridge			37.3462°N 80.6895°W	
	US 460 (Virginia Avenue)	Ripplemead	1974	37.3303°N 80.6779°W	
	Pembroke Bridge (disused)	Pembroke		37.3149°N 80.6437°W	
	SR 623 (Rocky Hollow Road)	Pembroke	1996	37.3148°N 80.6436°W	
	SR 730 (Eggleston Road)	Eggleston	1980	37.2860°N 80.6164°W	
Pulaski County–Montgomery County
	Radford Army Ammunition Plant bridge		1943	37.1940°N 80.5413°W	
	NS Christiansburg District			37.1773°N 80.5649°W	
	SR 114 (Peppers Ferry Boulevard)	Fairlawn–Centerville	1990, 2013	37.1617°N 80.5521°W	
Pulaski County–Radford
	New River Bridge; US 11 (Lee Highway)	Fairlawn–Radford	2002, 2005	37.1388°N 80.5745°W	
	NS Pulaski District	New River–Radford		37.1341°N 80.5829°W	
	Ingles Ferry Bridge; I-81	Radford	1965	37.0893°N 80.5802°W	
Pulaski County
	Claytor Dam			37.0755°N 80.5851°W	
	Lowmans Ferry Bridge; SR 672 (Lowmans Ferry Road)	Mack Creek Village		37.0026°N 80.6826°W	
	New River Trail	Hiwassee		36.9633°N 80.7196°W	
Wythe County
	SR 100 (Wysor Highway)	Barren Springs	2007	36.9189°N 80.8052°W	
	US 52 (Fort Chiswell Road)	Galena	1997	36.8713°N 80.8689°W	
	I-77	Galena	1978, 1980	36.8711°N 80.8721°W	
	SR 636 (Store Hill Road)	Austinville	1987	36.8544°N 80.9195°W	
	New River Trail			36.8483°N 80.9390°W	
Carroll County
	Buck Dam; Buck Dam Road			36.8082°N 80.9387°W	
	Byllesby Dam			36.7862°N 80.9332°W	
	Fries Junction Bridge			36.7599°N 80.9561°W	
	SR 606 (Fries Road)	Fries	1959	36.7172°N 80.9559°W	
	Fries Dam	Fries		36.7138°N 80.9864°W	
Grayson County
	SR 94 (Riverside Drive)		2011	36.6461°N 80.9788°W	
	US 58 / US 221 (Grayson Parkway)	Baywood	1979, 1999	36.6127°N 81.0458°W	
	US 21 / US 221 (New River Parkway)		1989	36.5758°N 81.1579°W	
Alleghany County, North Carolina
	Farmers Fish Camp Road	Amelia, North Carolina	2015	36.5519°N 81.1817°W	
Grayson County
	Bridle Creek Bridge; SR 601 (Cox's Chapel Road)		1956	36.5959°N 81.2416°W	
	Fields Dam			36.6024°N 81.3109°W	
	J. Cam Fields Memorial Bridge; SR 93 (County Line Road)	Mouth of Wilson	1982	36.5852°N 81.3140°W	
Ashe County, North Carolina–Alleghany County, North Carolina
New River splits into North Fork and South Fork
