= Interstate 77 in West Virginia =

Section of Interstate Highway in West Virginia, United States

Interstate 77
- I-77 highlighted in red

Route information
- Maintained by WVDOH and WVPA
- Length: 187.21 mi (301.29 km)
- Existed: 1958–present
- History: Completed in 1974
- NHS: Entire route

Major junctions
- South end: I-77 / US 52 at the Virginia state line near Bluefield
- US 460 near Princeton; I-64 from Beckley to Charleston; WV 16 / WV 97 at Beckley; US 19 near Beckley; US 60 at Charleston; I-79 near Charleston; US 33 from Ripley to Ravenswood; WV 2 from Ravenswood to Parkersburg; US 50 at Parkersburg
- North end: I-77 at the Ohio state line at the Marietta-Williamstown Interstate Bridge in Williamstown

Location
- Country: United States
- State: West Virginia
- Counties: Mercer, Raleigh, Fayette, Kanawha, Jackson, Wood

Highway system
- Interstate Highway System; Main; Auxiliary; Suffixed; Business; Future; West Virginia State Highway System; Interstate; US; State
← WV 76	→ WV 78

Interstate 77 (I-77) in the US state of West Virginia is a major north–south Interstate Highway. It extends for 187.21 miles (301.29 km) between Bluefield at the Virginia state line and Williamstown at the Ohio state line.

The highway serves Charleston, the capital and largest city in West Virginia; it also serves the cities of Princeton, Beckley, and Parkersburg. I-77 follows the entire length of the West Virginia Turnpike, a toll road that runs between Princeton and Charleston, and it runs concurrently with I-64 between Beckley and Charleston.

Historically, the West Virginia Turnpike was a two-lane road with treacherous curves and a tunnel (which has since been decommissioned). Construction began in 1952, several years before the Interstate Highway System was funded. It was only in 1987 that the entire length of the turnpike was upgraded to Interstate standards. Due to the difficulty and lives lost in construction, it has been called "88 miles of miracle".

== Route description ==
=== Virginia to Charleston ===
West Virginia Turnpike
- Location: Princeton–Charleston
- Length: 88 mi (142 km)
- Existed: November 8, 1954–present

I-77 enters West Virginia from Virginia via the East River Mountain Tunnel, running concurrently with US Route 52 (US 52). It surfaces in Mercer County to the east of Bluefield as a four-lane freeway. I-77's first exit in West Virginia is 0.6 miles (0.97 km) north of the state line; US 52 leaves the highway here. I-77 then turns to the northeast and comes to a partial interchange with West Virginia Route 112 (WV 112) in Ingleside. Changing its course to a more northerly alignment, I-77 reaches another partial interchange serving County Route 27 (CR 27). It then continues north toward Princeton, which is served by an interchange with US 460. Here, I-77 becomes the West Virginia Turnpike, which it remains through Charleston. The highway continues northward through rural Mercer County, roughly following US 19. After passing over WV 20 with no access, the space between the northbound and southbound roadways widens. The two roadways reunite at a point north of an interchange for CR 7 and WV 20 near Gardner. Continuing north, the highway approaches the turnpike's Bluestone Service Plaza, accessible from the northbound lanes only. I-77 then crosses the Bluestone River in Eads Mill, and the southbound roadway has a rest area and weigh station. Now heading northwesterly, the highway approaches an interchange with US 19 and passes Camp Creek State Park in Camp Creek, where the road turns north again.

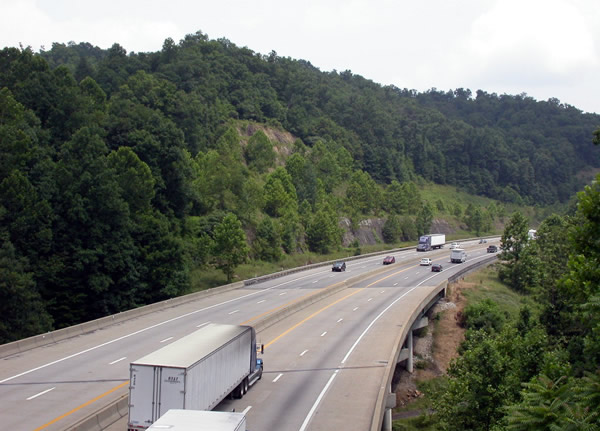
The West Virginia Turnpike in Fayette County

Running closely parallel with US 19, I-77 enters Raleigh County near the community of Ghent. Here, the road has an interchange with CR 48, providing access to Winterplace Ski Resort. I-77's northbound and southbound lanes separate here, and the highway approaches its first toll plaza. The two roadways reunite at a point south of Daniels. I-77 meets I-64 south of Beckley, and the two highways become concurrent. The highways bypass the west side of Beckley, meeting WV 16 and WV 3 and passing the turnpike's Beckley Service Area, which includes Tamarack Marketplace at exit 45. Near the community of Prosperity, the highway has an exit for US 19 with a toll on the northbound exit and southbound entrance. I-77 heads north from Beckley into the Appalachian Mountains. It enters Fayette County near Pax, where it has an exit serving CR 23/2. After this exit is the second toll plaza on the turnpike. Continuing in a northwest direction, I-77 comes to an interchange with WV 612 near Mossy. Immediately after the northbound exit, the median narrows and changes to a Jersey barrier. This section of the road until Chelyan has a large number of curves, and it passes the Morton Service Area.

The turnpike crosses into Kanawha County near Standard shortly afterward. Curving to the west and to the north again, I-77 has an exit serving Sharon. The highway continues north until it reaches the northernmost toll plaza on the turnpike and the Kanawha River near Cabin Creek, where it turns northwest to follow the river toward Charleston. Soon afterward is an exit for the Admiral T. J. Lopez Bridge, providing access to US 60 on the north side of the river. Parallel with WV 61, after passing Chesapeake and Marmet, I-77 crosses the river between exits 95 (WV 61) and 96 (US 60) in Port Amherst. The West Virginia Turnpike ends after exit 96.

=== Charleston to Ohio ===
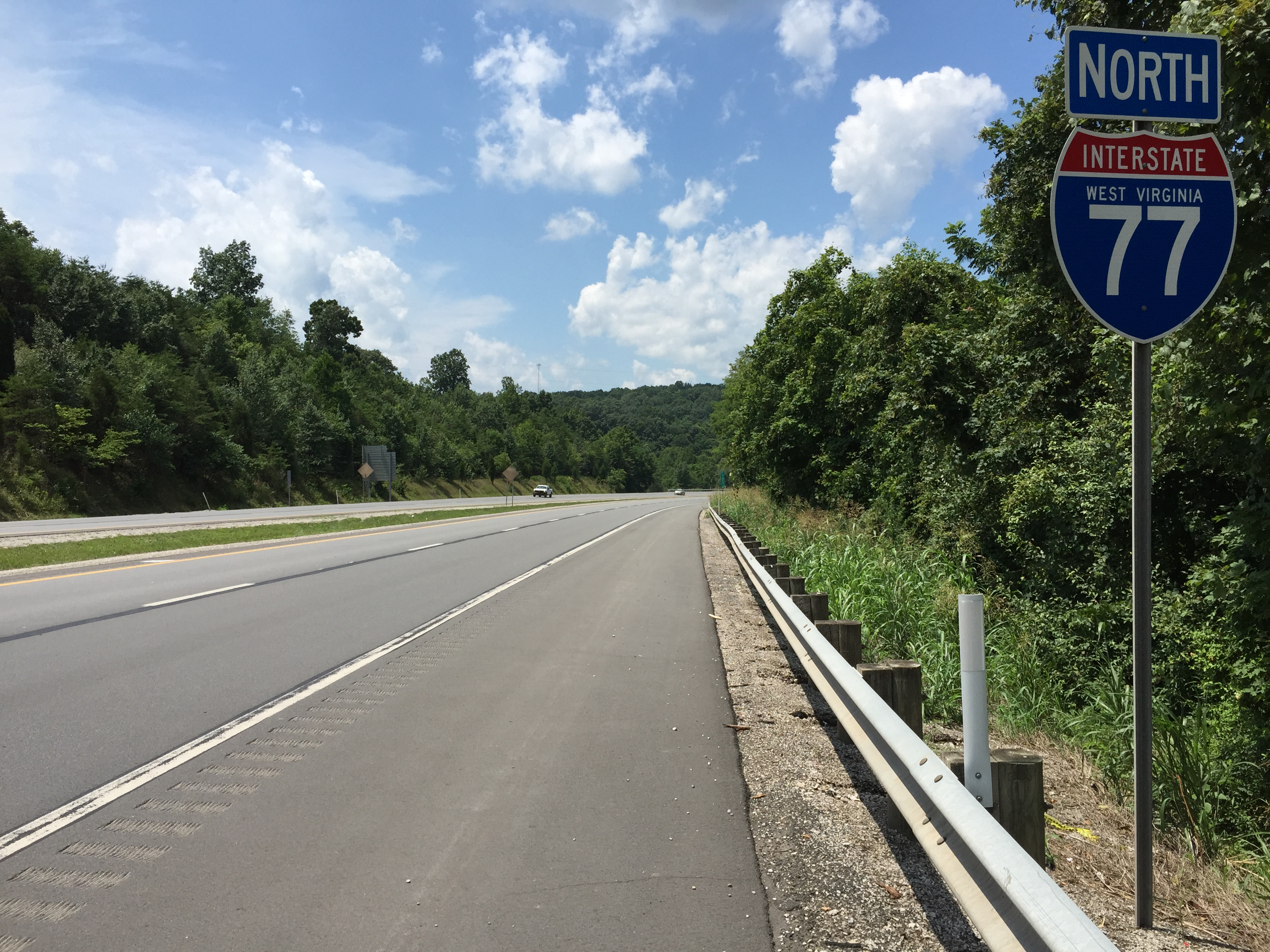
View north along I-77 north of CR 21 in Fairplain

I-77/I-64 continues west along the north side of the Kanawha River closely parallel with US 60 after the turnpike ends. In eastern Charleston, the highway passes to the north of the historic Craik-Patton House. Continuing northwest, the road comes to interchanges serving the 35th Street Bridge and WV 114, the latter of which provides access to the West Virginia State Capitol. The route then enters downtown Charleston and crosses the Elk River before separating from I-64 at an interchange in north Charleston. I-77 heads northeasterly along the river until it meets the southern terminus of I-79 at a modified full Y interchange near Yeager Airport. (Instead of the expected treatment of I-77 as the primary route at this interchange, the following traffic movements are found: northbound I-77 through traffic curves to the left, while traffic to northbound I-79 exits right; southbound I-77 through traffic curves to the right and merges on the right with traffic from southbound I-79, while traffic to northbound I-79 both exits and merges on the left; southbound I-79 traffic merges on the left with traffic from southbound I-77, while traffic to northbound I-77 both exits and merges on the left.) I-77 then heads north into rural Kanawha County. After passing interchanges with CR 27, CR 29, WV 622, and CR 21 in Sissonville, the freeway enters Jackson County near Goldtown.

I-77 serves the communities of Kenna via an interchange with WV 34 and Fairplain via CR 21. The highway continues northward through Ripley, where it intersects US 33 and WV 62. It runs concurrently with US 33 and does so through Silverton, where US 33 leaves the Interstate and WV 2 joins it. I-77/WV 2 turns northeasterly toward Rockport, where it enters Wood County and turns northward toward Parkersburg. The highway runs through the southeast corner of Parkersburg, bypassing the center of the city. After an interchange with WV 14 near Mineral Wells, I-77/WV 2 crosses the Little Kanawha River south of Parkersburg, intersects WV 47 and US 50, and heads northeastward from the city. WV 2 leaves I-77 soon after, at exit 179 for WV 68 in North Hills. I-77 heads northward toward Williamstown, which is served by an exit for WV 14. I-77 then crosses the Ohio River into Marietta, Ohio, on the Marietta–Williamstown Interstate Bridge.

== History ==
=== Early years ===
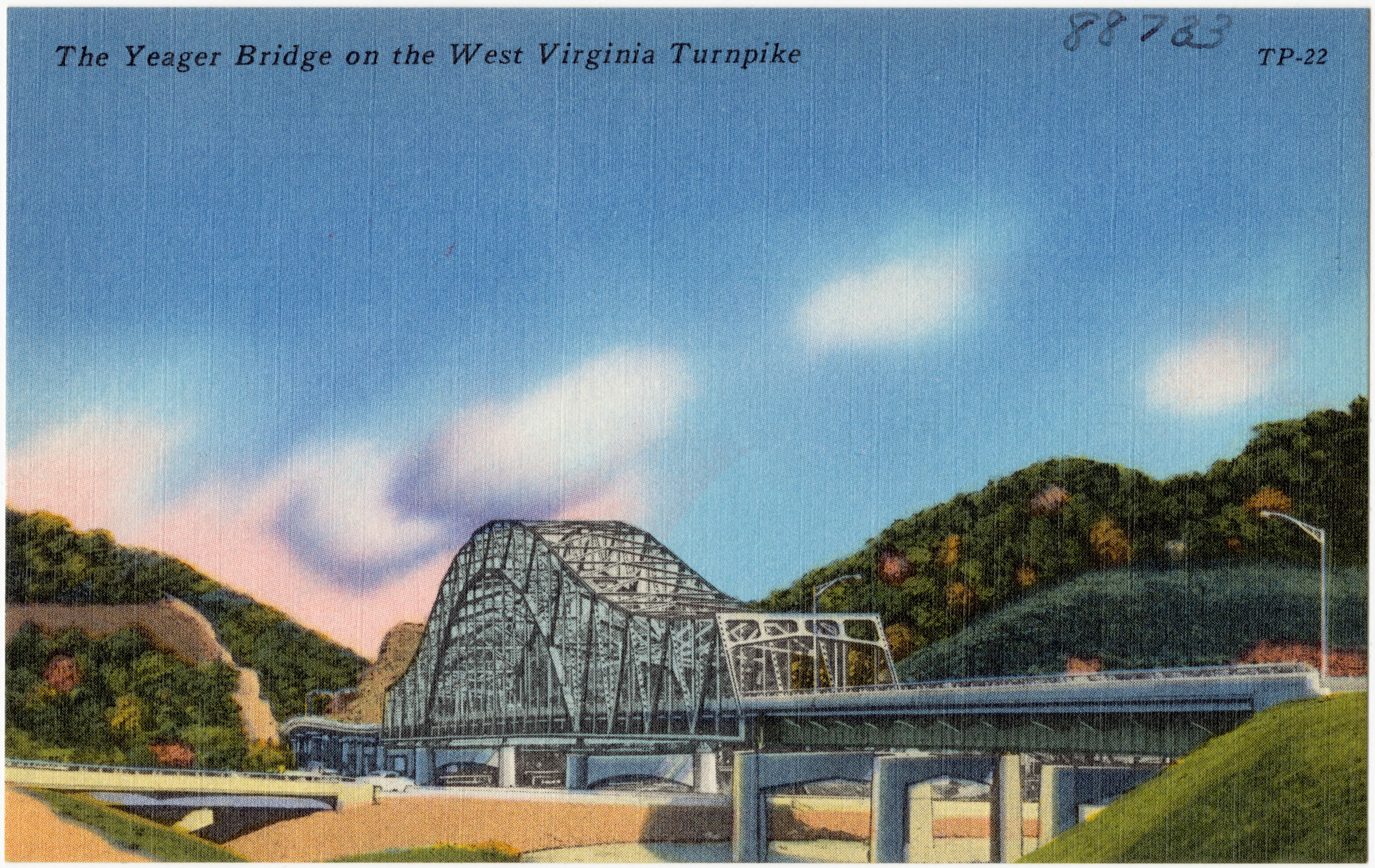
Postcard view of the Yeager Bridge

In the antebellum years before West Virginia separated from Virginia, development of adequate roads was a major area of conflict between the western regions and the east. Through the Virginia Board of Public Works, the Virginia state government helped finance turnpikes among its programs to encourage internal improvements, with tolls collected to defray operating costs and retire debt. Principal among these was the east–west Staunton and Parkersburg Turnpike, completed from Staunton to the Ohio River at Parkersburg immediately prior to the American Civil War (1861–1865). However, many of the internal transportation improvements were destroyed during that conflict, leaving bonded debt still to be paid, even as additional progress had ended. After resolution by the US Supreme Court, which assigned a third of the amount due to the new state early in the 20th century, West Virginia was faced with retiring its share of Virginia's antebellum debt for the earlier turnpikes (and canals and railroads) even as the citizens needed and sought better roads.

With the completion of the earliest portion of the Pennsylvania Turnpike in 1940, the desire for such a superhighway in West Virginia took hold. By the mid 20th century, in the years before creation of the Interstate Highway System in 1956, superhighways in the form of additional toll roads, such as the New Jersey Turnpike in 1951 and the Ohio Turnpike and 1955, began stimulating economic development and enhancing transportation in the eastern US. The challenge of terrain in West Virginia mirrored that of Pennsylvania in some ways but with several important distinctions. The most important of these was that the first portion of the Pennsylvania Turnpike had largely followed and utilized a costly earlier rail project which had never been completed. On the West Virginia Turnpike, there would be no such advantage.

=== Planning and construction ===
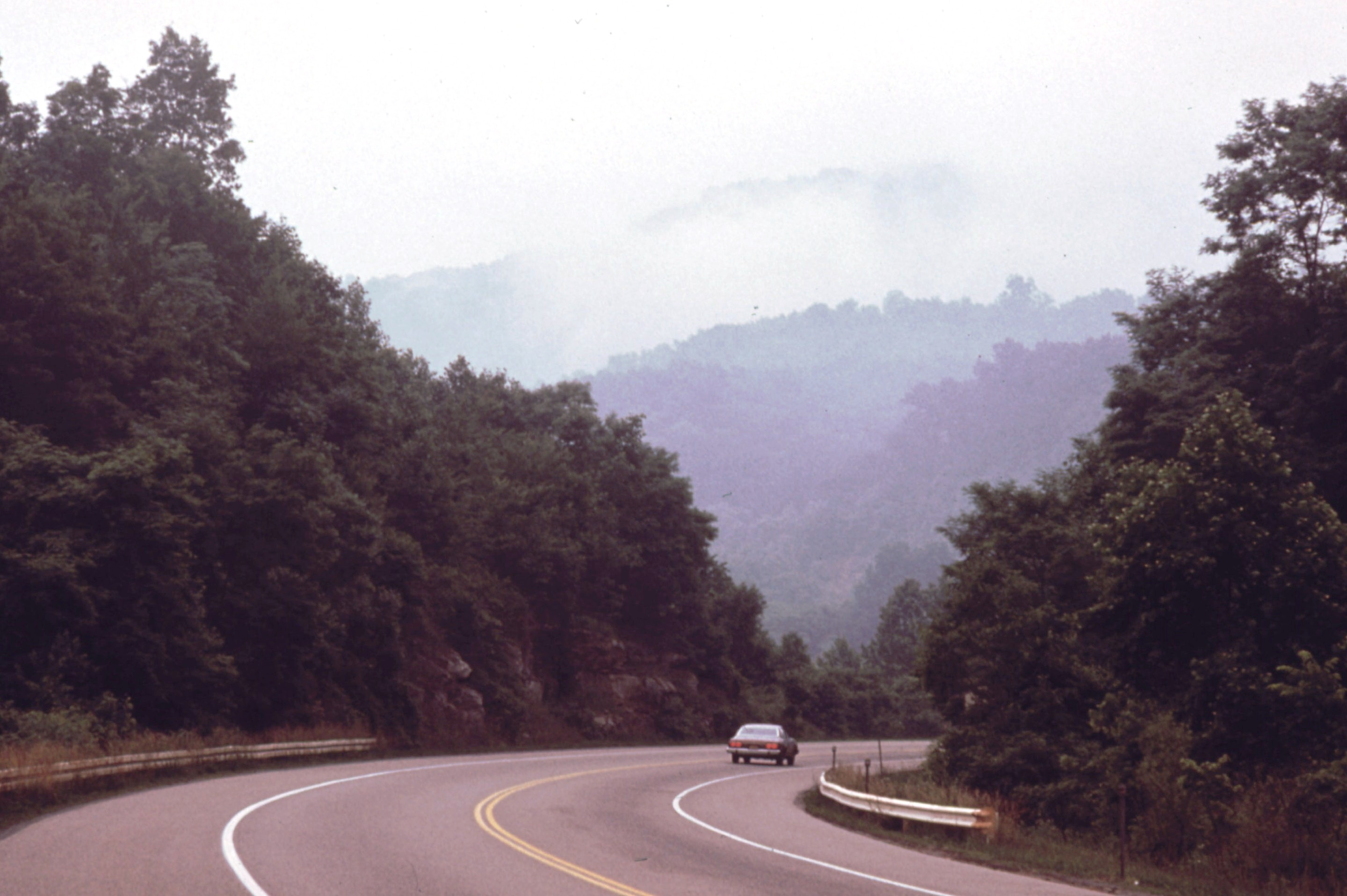
A two-lane segment of the West Virginia Turnpike north of Beckley in 1974

Originally serviced by railroads and then two-lane highways, by the mid-20th century, the cities of southern and central West Virginia grew to the point where the roadways between these regions were becoming woefully inadequate. Heavier traffic loads and increasing traffic volumes made the existing roads dangerous with safety statistics to prove it. In 1949, Governor Okey Patteson oversaw the creation of the Turnpike Commission, which was the start of the planning of what was to become the West Virginia Turnpike.

Two years earlier, the state legislature had appropriated funds to study the feasibility of building a superhighway comparable to similar projects being planned and constructed in other states. Early proposals showed a highway stretching from Parkersburg to Princeton, while another map diagrammed a route from Wheeling to Princeton. Both of these plans, however, were shelved in a 1951 study, citing the extreme costs of building a modern highway through very unforgiving terrain as the primary reason. The study recommended that the northern terminus be moved to Fairplain just outside Ripley and that the southern terminus remain in Princeton. The study also suggested that the highway be constructed as a two-lane facility rather than a four-lane highway, with provisions for future widening when funding became available.

In November 1951, the final alignment was chosen. The route was 22 miles (35 km) shorter than the original road mileage between Charleston and Princeton but would save motorists over two hours of driving between those two points. Original cost projections came in at $78 million (equivalent to $753 million in 2024). According to the West Virginia Turnpike CAF Report:

The Commission issued $96 million [equivalent to $908 million in 2024] of 3 3/4% revenue bonds in April 1952, and groundbreaking took place in August of that year. Due to the occurrence of large slides midway through construction that had to be corrected at additional expense, revenue bonds for an additional $37 million [equivalent to $350 million in 2024] were sold at 4 1/8%. When ground was broken on the first segment of the turnpike, the northern terminus had once again been moved south. This time, it was placed at Charleston, citing cost as the primary reason. The cost was projected to be $133 million (equivalent to $1.26 billion in 2024) and to be funded through bonds that would be repaid through a system of tolls. This cost included $5 million (equivalent to $47.3 million in 2024) for a two-lane tunnel to connect Dawes to Standard. The year 1953 kicked off a period of intense earthmoving that at its peak reached a million cubic yards [0.76×10^{6} m^{3}] a week and totaled 30,000,000 cubic yards [23×10^{6} m^{3}].

Construction took two years at the cost of five lives. The first section of the highway, the southern 36 miles (58 km) from Beckley to Princeton, opened to traffic on September 2, 1954. In November, the remaining 52 miles (84 km) between Charleston and Beckley opened. The new turnpike had several nicknames, including "88 miles [142 km] of miracle" and "the engineering marvel that beat the mountains". Triangular turnpike shields, with the words "West Virginia" at the top and an interlocking "T" and "P" in the center, were installed along the highway. Six interchanges were constructed. Initially, the road used a ticket-based tolling system. At each interchange, bridges and underpasses for the mainline had an extra set of graded lanes, indicating that the turnpike was expected to be widened in the future. According to the West Virginia Turnpike CAF Report:

The $1.5 million per mile [$0.93 million/km; equivalent to $13.9 million per mile ($8.7 million/km) in 2024)] was only one of the staggering statistics used by journalists as far away as Michigan and New York to describe their "amazement at an engineering achievement of such heroic proportions".

Three service areas, each served by an at-grade intersection, were constructed at Morton, Bluestone, and Beckley. The service areas were originally referred to as "Glass Houses".

For the first few years, the West Virginia Turnpike was a desolate roadway. Although the northern terminus was in a large city, it connected to no other major highways or free-flowing roads. The highway lost some of its "marvel" when The Saturday Evening Post referred to the road as "the turnpike that goes to nowhere". Popular T-shirts proclaimed, "I survived the West Virginia Turnpike."

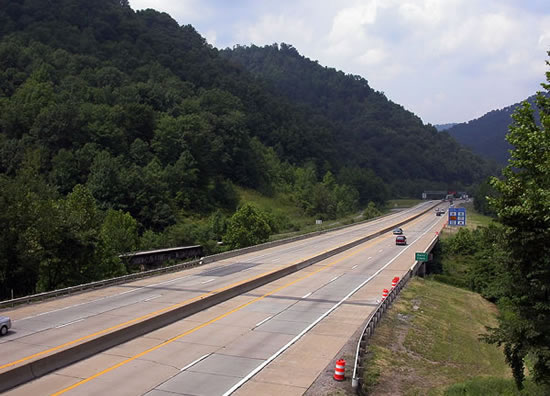
The West Virginia Turnpike in Kanawha County near the Morton Service Area

Soon after the turnpike was completed, the Interstate Highway System began. The new turnpike, despite its lack of compliance with Interstate Highway standards, would cut travel time considerably through the state of West Virginia and link the southern states to the northern states. One of these included I-77, which was to run across the pre existing roadway in order to reduce construction. The Turnpike was officially designated as part of I-77 in 1958. In 1967, a new free stretch of roadway near the Ohio River was opened, construction began on the segment between the West Virginia Turnpike's (relocated) northern terminus to the Ohio state line soon after. In August 1969, construction began on the section between the turnpike's relocated southern terminus and the Virginia state line. Like with the West Virginia Turnpike, challenges were faced during the latter's construction, such as boring a vehicular tunnel, as well as avoiding caves, mud, springs and hard to break tuscarora sandstone. The Ohio extension was completed in 1972, and the Virginia extension was completed on December 20, 1974.

=== Since completion ===
Originally, engineers had thought that the West Virginia Turnpike could be left as originally built once I-77 was completed. However, a law passed in 1966 made it so that all interstates, predating their designation as such or not, would have to be four lanes wide. This effectively meant that the turnpike would leave a gap in I-77, as it was a Super two freeway for all but 31 miles, where there was a four lane configuration for only six miles and a three lane configuration for 25 miles. This gap in adequate standards resulted in a major bottleneck; congestion at the toll plazas was particularly serious. On top of this, the roadway had also lacked any measures to protect oncoming traffic from crossing directions, which resulted in many head on collisions, and an increased amount of fatalities. Additionally, the increased traffic led to the roads pavement buckling, which was a serious safety hazard. The lack of connection with the Turnpike had also caused the traffic on I-64 between Sam Black Church and Charleston to use a scenic but treacherous section of US 60 known as the Midland Trail through Rainelle and Ansted before the road descended Gauley Mountain at Hawk's Nest to the Kanawha River Valley to reach Charleston. There were terrible accidents along this stretch and lengthy delays as trucks negotiated the major grades. Because of these issues, studies to upgrade the highway were undertaken after the 1966 legislation. In 1968, it was determined that upgrading the turnpike would be more feasible than bypassing it. This was followed by legislation in 1970 that would allow the newly rebuilt roadway to stay as the West Virginia Turnpike. In 1974, the cost to expand the turnpike to four lanes was estimated at $350 million (equivalent to $1.73 billion in 2024). When the project had not started in 1975, articles in local newspapers attacked the state workers for their "laziness" in pursuing the upgrade of the highway. Turnpike officials worried, as the costs for upgrading the toll road were increasing dramatically. By 1975, the death toll for the only 21-year-old highway was at 278, and, in 1979, 28 fatalities occurred on the turnpike. In 1976, contracts totaling well over $200 million (equivalent to $856 million in 2024) were awarded, construction began that December. The first section to be modernized was the section from milepost 10.6 (just north of exit 9, US 460) in Mercer County to milepost 35.52 (south of exit 40, I-64) in Raleigh County. In building this expansion, much of the terrain, and by extension the original road, needed to be demolished through use of explosive charges. Overpasses were also rebuilt. This first stretch was completed in 1979. As part of this project, exits 14, 20 and 28 were also constructed. In 1980, a segment from milepost 46.7 to milepost 47.95, as well as the newly built exit 48, with US 19, were completed just north of Beckley. In 1981, Fayette County completed a brief segment from milepost 56.15 near Long Branch to milepost 59.63 (exit 60, Mossy) and from milepost 62.27 near Kingston to milepost 66.51 (exit 66, Mahan). In 1982, the modernization of the turnpike from milepost 52.2 just south of Willis Branch to milepost 6.12 near Lively was completed, this also involved construction of a new exit 89. A second Kanawha River Bridge near Malden and the Kanawha City neighborhood of Charleston was built to carry an additional two lanes of traffic between mileposts 94.96–95.87. This four-lane upgrade was extended southward to milepost 90 (exit 89, WV 94, Marmet) in 1984.

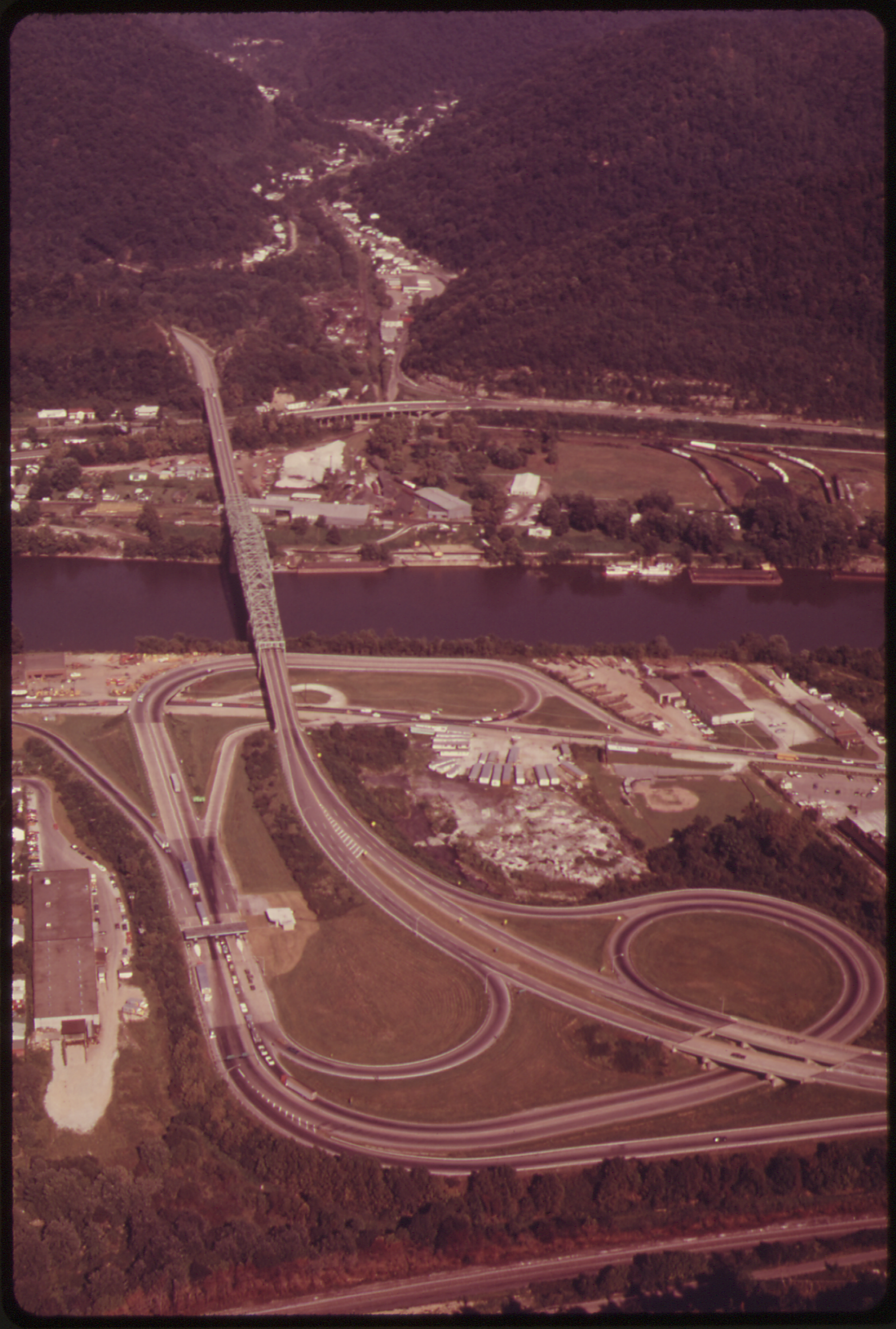
Aerial view of exit 95 in 1973, when the interchange contained a toll plaza

A segment between Fayette and Kanawha counties was widened from milepost 66.51 (exit 66, Mahan) to milepost 74.96 (exit 74, Standard) in 1983, this involved construction of the new exit 63 and exit 74. Traffic just to the west of the latter interchange used the two-lane Bender Bridge and Memorial Tunnel. In 1984, the turnpike was widened from milepost 90 (exit 89, WV 94, Marmet) to milepost 82.55; this included construction of a new Toll Plaza C near Sharon. In 1985, work continued on a segment south of Mossy from milepost 59.63 (exit 60, Mossy) to milepost 62.27 near Kingston. Also, a segment from the southern terminus of the turnpike at milepost 8.97 (exit 9, US 460) to milepost 10.6 in Mercer County was reconstructed. In the same year, the Raleigh County segment from milepost 40.73 (exit 40, I-64) to milepost 43.83 (exit 44, WV 3) was dualized, and the segment from milepost 47.95 (exit 48, to US 19) to milepost 52.2 (Toll Plaza B at Pax) was completed. In 1986, the segment from milepost 35.52 to milepost 40.73 (exit 40, I-64) was dualized. In 1987, work was finished on the dualization from milepost 43.83 (exit 44, WV 3) to milepost 46.6. By this time, the upgrade of 87 miles (140 km) of the 88 miles (142 km) of the turnpike were essentially completed. The only remaining segment, the Memorial Tunnel, once hailed as "state-of-the-art" and the "most majestic feature of the highway", was becoming a bottleneck in the otherwise four-lane highway. By 1986, the Turnpike Commission was spending over $500,000 per year (equivalent to $1.21 million per year in 2024) to maintain the lights and the automatic exhaust equipment in the tunnel. Several options were considered, including dualization of the tunnels, addition of two lanes through a large road cut in the mountain, leaving the other two lanes in the tunnel, and replacement of the entire tunnel with an open cut to the north. Citing the high maintenance costs of a tunnel, the replacement option was ultimately chosen. The 1.72-mile (2.77 km) bypass would bypass both the tunnel and the Bender Bridge which crossed Paint Creek just to the east of the tunnel portal. On July 6, 1987, the Memorial Tunnel officially closed, and two lanes of the open cut just to the north of it were opened. The other two lanes of the open cut were completed in late August. State Trooper W. D. Thomson became the last motorist to drive through the tunnel. It was not meant to be that way. Originally, Tommy Graley of Standard and his two daughters were picked to be in the last vehicle to pass through the tunnel, but his pickup truck was followed by a car carrying Turnpike officials and the state trooper. The new Memorial Tunnel bypass cost $35 million (equivalent to $82.7 million in 2024) and required years of work. Ten million cubic yards (7.6×10^{6} m^{3}) of earth were removed and used as fill with drainage tiles for Paint Creek. Some 300,000 short tons (270,000 t; 270,000 long tons) of coal were extracted. The Bender Bridge was demolished that September. The Memorial Tunnel was used for storage until the mid-1990s, when it became a testing center for tunnel-fire suppression for Boston's Big Dig project. The tunnel is still being used today by the National Response Center for military and other testing uses. The bypass was not the first of its kind on a toll road, as the Pennsylvania Turnpike bypassed the Laurel Hill Tunnel in 1964 in similar fashion, and later bypassed two more tunnels with a single stretch of highway in 1968. The final cost for the entire modernization of the West Virginia Turnpike was $683 million (equivalent to $1.61 billion in 2024), more than $300 million (equivalent to $709 million in 2024) over original estimates. It was also one of the few Interstates that received 90-percent federal funding and permission to charge a toll, due to extremely high construction costs. However, the tolls were removed between exit 9 and Toll Plaza A, as well as Toll Plaza C and exit 96 A total of 17 interchanges now existed on the West Virginia Turnpike, up from six. A rest area is now provided at milepost 69 for southbound motorists, and a scenic overlook of the Bluestone River also serves southbound motorists. The turnpike displays many cuts through mountains as well as lanes that are separated from each other by substantial difference in elevation. With the work, all of I-77 in West Virginia was at least four lanes wide . The final of the construction, the I-64 interchange was put into service by 1988.

On June 1, 1989, the West Virginia Legislature created the West Virginia Parkways, Economic Development and Tourism Authority to replace the Turnpike Commission. The year also saw the removal of toll plazas from all the interchanges but exit 48, transitioning the turnpike from using the ticket system to the barrier system.

In 1991, the Morton and Bluestone Glass Houses were replaced with larger, more modern travel centers. Morton and Bluestone service plazas were available to northbound travelers only, while the Beckley service plaza was accessible only to southbound motorists. HMSHost operates the various restaurants at the plazas, while ExxonMobil (through its Exxon brand) operates the gas station at each plaza.

In 1993, the Beckley Glass House was replaced by a more modern travel plaza.

In May 1996, exit 45 was opened to serve the Beckley travel plaza, Dry Hill Road, and the newly constructed Tamarack Marketplace arts and crafts outlet. Because this interchange was a full one, it made the Beckley plaza accessible to northbound travelers for the first time.

In 1997, exit 85 was rebuilt to connecto to the Admiral T. J. Lopez Bridge.

From late 1999 to early 2000, all electronic tolling was introduced across the Turnpike.

In 2004, a concession stand and new restroom facilities were constructed at the rest area at milepost 69, serving southbound travelers.

From 2008 to 2012, E-ZPass was introduced across the turnpike, replacing the existing all electronic system in the process.

In 2013, the West Virginia House of Delegates voted in support of a resolution to remove tolls on the turnpike by 2020, making the entire road free of charge. but the West Virginia Parkways Authority resolved in 2016 to continue charging tolls after that date.

The milepost 69 rest area and snack bar was reconstructed into a larger facility in 2017.

As early as 2006, the Turnpike had considered widening the section near Beckley to six lanes. However, they cancelled this plan, as they had thought it would be too expensive. Despite this, in November 2018, the West Virginia Turnpike Authority awarded Saint Albans contractor Triton Construction and the project began immediately. Work on the project between exits 40 and 48 from four to six lanes also required reconstructing eight bridges to be wider, replacing lighting, and extending the deceleration lanes of exits 45 and 48. Work was completed in November 2021, at the cost of $106,000,000.

In 2021, the Parkways Authority sought public input for modernization of the travel plazas, representing the first significant work on the travel plazas since some of them were rebuilt in the 1990s. At the result of this, in 2022, the Beckley and Bluestone Service Plazas were closed to undergo a $122 million reconstruction to bring them up to the milepost 69 plazas standards. On December 15, 2023, the new Beckley and Bluestone service plazas were opened.

In 2023, the eastbound lanes of the West Virginia Turnpike between milepost 121.5 and milepost 48 was rebuilt, with the old roadway and steel mesh removed and new steel mesh added and old concrete re-poured for use on the new roadway. On March 22, 2024, the same began on the westbound lanes.

WVDOT plans to rebuild the 7.3-mile free section of roadway between Tuppers Creek Road and the Jackson County Line. West Virginia Paving, the sole bidder for the project, offered $51,252,637.96 on June 11, 2024. A contract for the project was awarded on June 27.

== Tolls ==
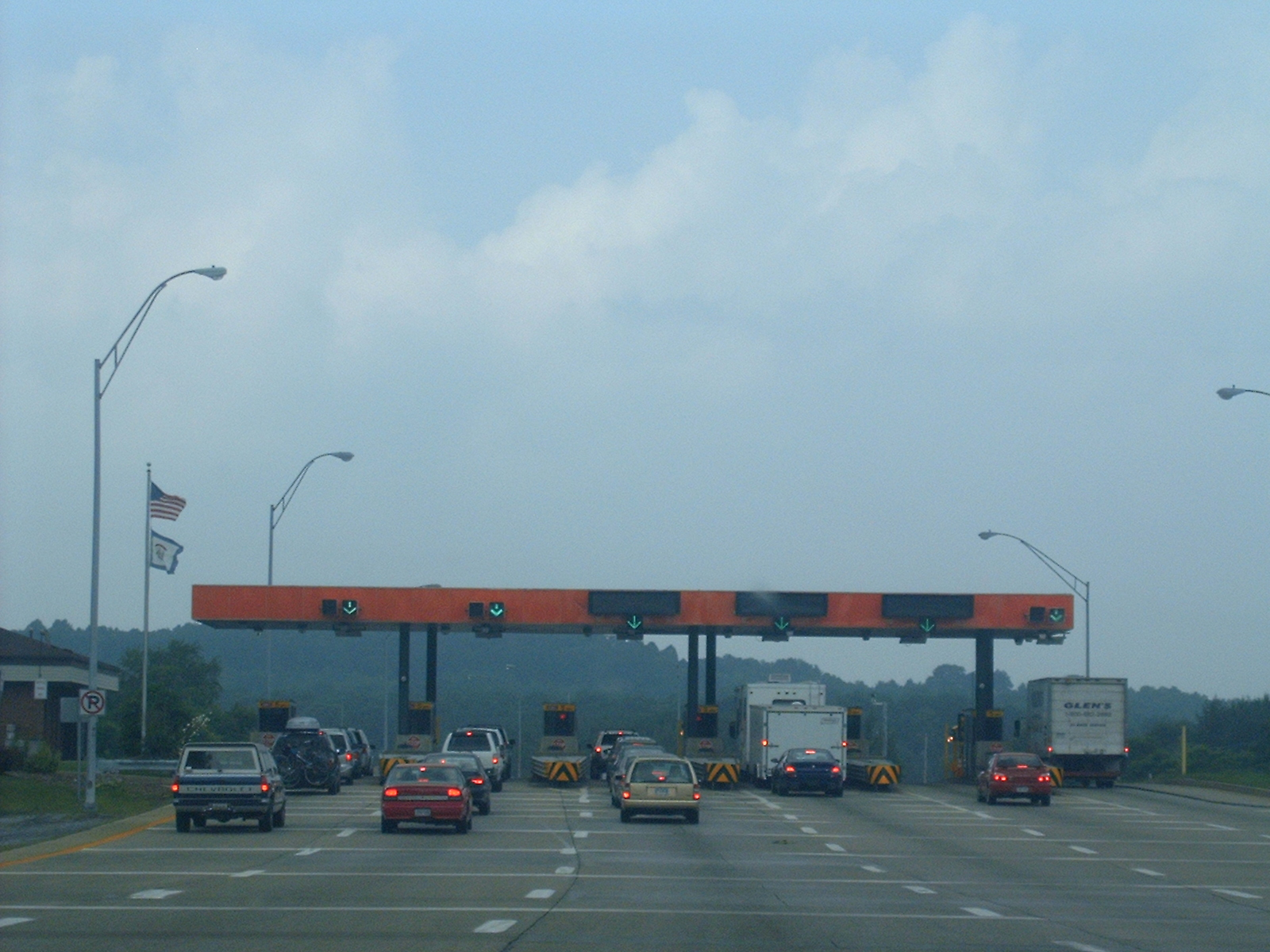
Toll booths on the West Virginia Turnpike

There are three toll barriers along the turnpike. As of January 2025, passenger cars with two axles pay $4.50 at each barrier. There is also a toll plaza at exit 48, which charges $0.89 for passenger cars exiting northbound and entering southbound. Rates for larger vehicles are higher. The West Virginia Turnpike is a member of the E-ZPass electronic toll collection consortium, allowing members to attach a transponder to their windshield or front bumper and pay electronically. West Virginia E-ZPass members can pay a flat annual fee for unlimited travel on the West Virginia Turnpike.

The Parkways Authority briefly raised toll rates on January 1, 2006, but a state judge found the hike to be illegal, rescinding it a few days later. The state legislature subsequently affirmed the judge's decision and removed the Commission's power to set rates, reserving that power to itself. Greg Barr, General Manager of the West Virginia Parkways Authority, had said that, while other states had dramatically increased their tolls over the past few years, the West Virginia Turnpike had not experienced any rate hikes in over two decades. However, tolls were increased by 60 percent (from $1.25 to $2 at each barrier) in 2009 and again by 100 percent (to $4.00 at each barrier) in 2019.

As of June 2026, the West Virginia Parkways Authority is considering transitioning to open road tolling along the West Virginia Turnpike.

=== Bond troubles ===
At one point in the turnpike's history, the Turnpike Commission was not able to pay off even the interest on its bonded indebtedness, and the first bond was not retired until 1982. When the original bond expired on December 1, 1989, the Turnpike Commission had difficulty determining how to refinance it.

Total revenues from 1954 through 1986 totaled $309.3 million (equivalent to $749 million in 2024), with interest of $170.7 million (equivalent to $413 million in 2024). In 1986, total annual revenues were $30.4 million (equivalent to $73.6 million in 2024). The commission predicted that when I-64 was completed from Beckley to Sam Black Church in 1988, 6,500 more vehicles would travel the turnpike daily. In the previous 10 years, the commission noted, traffic increased 100 percent and annual gross revenues increased from $11.4 million to $30.4 million (equivalent to $42.9 million to $71.8 million in 2024). The refinancing plan was ultimately completed about six months later, with a new debt approaching $50 million (equivalent to $118 million in 2024). Consequently, tolls were held at former rates, ranging from $3.75 to $12 (equivalent to $11 to $34 in 2025) per one-way through trip.

== Tamarack Marketplace ==
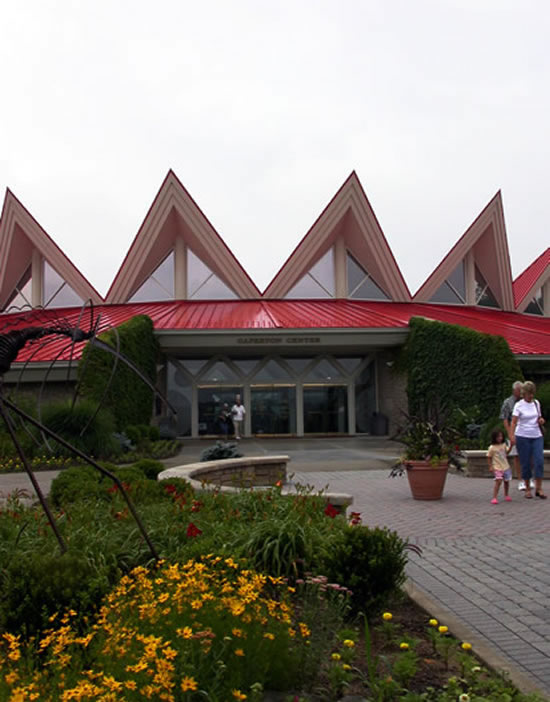
Tamarack Marketplace at the Beckley Service Area in Beckley

Tamarack Marketplace, located at the Beckley service area, is an arts and crafts outlet that draws over 500,000 visitors a year. Tamarack features juried West Virginia craft products, including handcrafts, pottery, jewelry, fine arts, and products made from textiles, glass, metal, and wood. There are live artisan demonstrations as well as live music, a theater, and storytelling performances. It also contains a cafeteria-style restaurant.

== Exit list ==
County	Location	mi	km	Exit	Destinations	Notes
East River Mountain		0.0	0.0		I-77 south / US 52 south / Future I-74 east – Wytheville	Continuation into Virginia
East River Mountain		0.0	0.0	East River Mountain Tunnel		
Mercer	Bluefield	0.6	0.97	1	US 52 north – Bluefield	Northern end of US 52 concurrency
Mercer	Ingleside	5.0	8.0	5	WV 112 – Ingleside	Southbound exit and northbound entrance
Mercer	Ingleside	6.7	10.8	7	CR 27 (Twelvemile Road) – Ingleside	Northbound exit and southbound entrance
Mercer	Princeton	8.8	14.2	9	US 460 – Princeton	Access to West Virginia Tourist Welcome Center and Vietnam War Memorial; southern end of West Virginia Turnpike
Mercer	Princeton	13.6	21.9	14	CR 7 to WV 20 (Athens Road) – Athens	Access to Concord University
Mercer	Princeton	15.2	24.5	Bluestone service plaza (northbound only)		
Mercer	Princeton	19.6	31.5	20	US 19 – Camp Creek	Access to Camp Creek State Park
Raleigh	Ghent	28.8	46.3	28	CR 48 – Ghent, Flat Top	
Raleigh	Ghent	30.3	48.8	Toll Plaza A		
Raleigh		39.3	63.2	40	I-64 east – Lewisburg	Southern end of I-64 concurrency
Raleigh	MacArthur	41.8	67.3	42	WV 16 / WV 97 (Robert C. Byrd Drive) – Mabscott	To US 121
Raleigh	Beckley	44.3	71.3	44	WV 3 (Harper Road) – Beckley	
Raleigh	Beckley	45.6	73.4	45	Tamarack: The Best of West Virginia	Access to Beckley Travel Plaza
Raleigh	Prosperity	47.4	76.3	48	To US 19 – North Beckley, Summersville	Tolled northbound exit and southbound entrance; also provides exit to WV 16
Fayette	Pax	54.4	87.5	54	CR 232 – Pax	
Fayette	Pax	56.1	90.3	Toll Plaza B		
Fayette	Mossy	59.4	95.6	60	WV 612 east – Mossy, Oak Hill	
Fayette		66.0	106.2	66	CR 15 – Mahan	
Kanawha		74.0	119.1	74	CR 83 (Paint Creek Road) – Montgomery	
Kanawha	Morton	75.6	121.7	Morton service plaza (northbound only)		
Kanawha		79.3	127.6	79	CR 793 (Cabin Creek Road) – Sharon	
Kanawha	Chelyan	82.6	132.9	Toll Plaza C		
Kanawha	Chelyan	84.5	136.0	85	US 60 / WV 61 – Chelyan, Cedar Grove	
Kanawha	Marmet	89.3	143.7	89	WV 94 to WV 61 – Marmet, Chesapeake	
Kanawha	Charleston	94.3	151.8	95	WV 61 (MacCorkle Avenue)	
Kanawha	Charleston	94.6	152.2	Chuck Yeager Bridge over the Kanawha River		
Kanawha	Charleston	95.5	153.7	96	US 60 east (Midland Trail) – Belle	Southern end of US 60 concurrency; northern end of West Virginia Turnpike
Kanawha	Charleston	96.6	155.5	97	US 60 west (Kanawha Boulevard)	Northern end of US 60 concurrency; northbound exit and southbound entrance
Kanawha	Charleston	98.0	157.7	98	To WV 61 / 35th Street Bridge	Southbound exit and northbound entrance
Kanawha	Charleston	98.9	159.2	99	WV 114 (Greenbrier Street) – State Capitol	
Kanawha	Charleston	100.0	160.9	100	Leon Sullivan Way, Capitol Street	
Kanawha	Charleston	100.7	162.1	101	I-64 west – Huntington	Northern end of I-64 concurrency
Kanawha	Charleston	101.4	163.2	102	US 119 (Westmoreland Road)	
Kanawha	Charleston	102.7	165.3	104	I-79 north – Clarksburg	Southern terminus of I-79; modified full Y interchange
Kanawha	Sissonville	105.9	170.4	106	CR 27 (Edens Fork Road)	
Kanawha	Sissonville	109.9	176.9	111	CR 29 (Tuppers Creek Road) – Sissonville	
Kanawha	Sissonville	112.4	180.9	114	WV 622 – Sissonville, Pocatalico	
Kanawha	Sissonville	115.0	185.1	116	CR 21 (Haines Branch Road) – Sissonville	
Jackson		118.9	191.4	119	CR 21 – Goldtown	
Jackson		123.9	199.4	124	WV 34 – Kenna	
Jackson	Ripley	131.4	211.5	132	CR 21 – Fairplain, Ripley	
Jackson	Ripley	136.9	220.3	138	US 33 east / WV 62 south – Ripley	Southern end of US 33 concurrency
Jackson	Silverton	145.9	234.8	146	US 33 west / WV 2 south – Silverton, Ravenswood	Northern end of US 33 concurrency; southern end of WV 2 concurrency
Jackson		153.4	246.9	154	CR 1 (Medina Road)	
Wood		160.7	258.6	161	CR 21 – Rockport	
Wood	Parkersburg	169.0	272.0	170	WV 14 – Mineral Wells, Parkersburg	
Wood	Parkersburg	172.2	277.1	173	WV 95 (Camden Avenue) – Downtown	
Wood	Parkersburg	172.9	278.3	174	WV 47 (Staunton Avenue) – Parkersburg	
Wood	Parkersburg	175.4	282.3	176	US 50 – Downtown	
Wood	Parkersburg	179.0	288.1	179	WV 2 north (Emerson Avenue east) / WV 68 south (Emerson Avenue west) – Vienna	Northern end of WV 2 concurrency
Wood	Williamstown	184.8	297.4	185	WV 14 to WV 31 – Williamstown, Vienna	
Ohio River		187.21	301.29	Marietta–Williamstown Interstate Bridge		
Ohio River		187.21	301.29		I-77 north – Marietta	Continuation into Ohio
1.000 mi = 1.609 km; 1.000 km = 0.621 mi: Concurrency terminus; Incomplete access; Tolled

== See also ==
Interstate 77
Previous state: Virginia	West Virginia	Next state: Ohio
