= West Virginia Route 612 =

State highway in West Virginia, United States

West Virginia Route 612

Route information
- Maintained by WVDOH
- Length: 8.40 mi (13.52 km)

Major junctions
- West end: I-64 / I-77 / CR 15/4 near Mossy
- East end: US 19 near Oak Hill

Location
- Country: United States
- State: West Virginia
- Counties: Fayette

Highway system
- West Virginia State Highway System; Interstate; US; State
← WV 601	→ WV 618

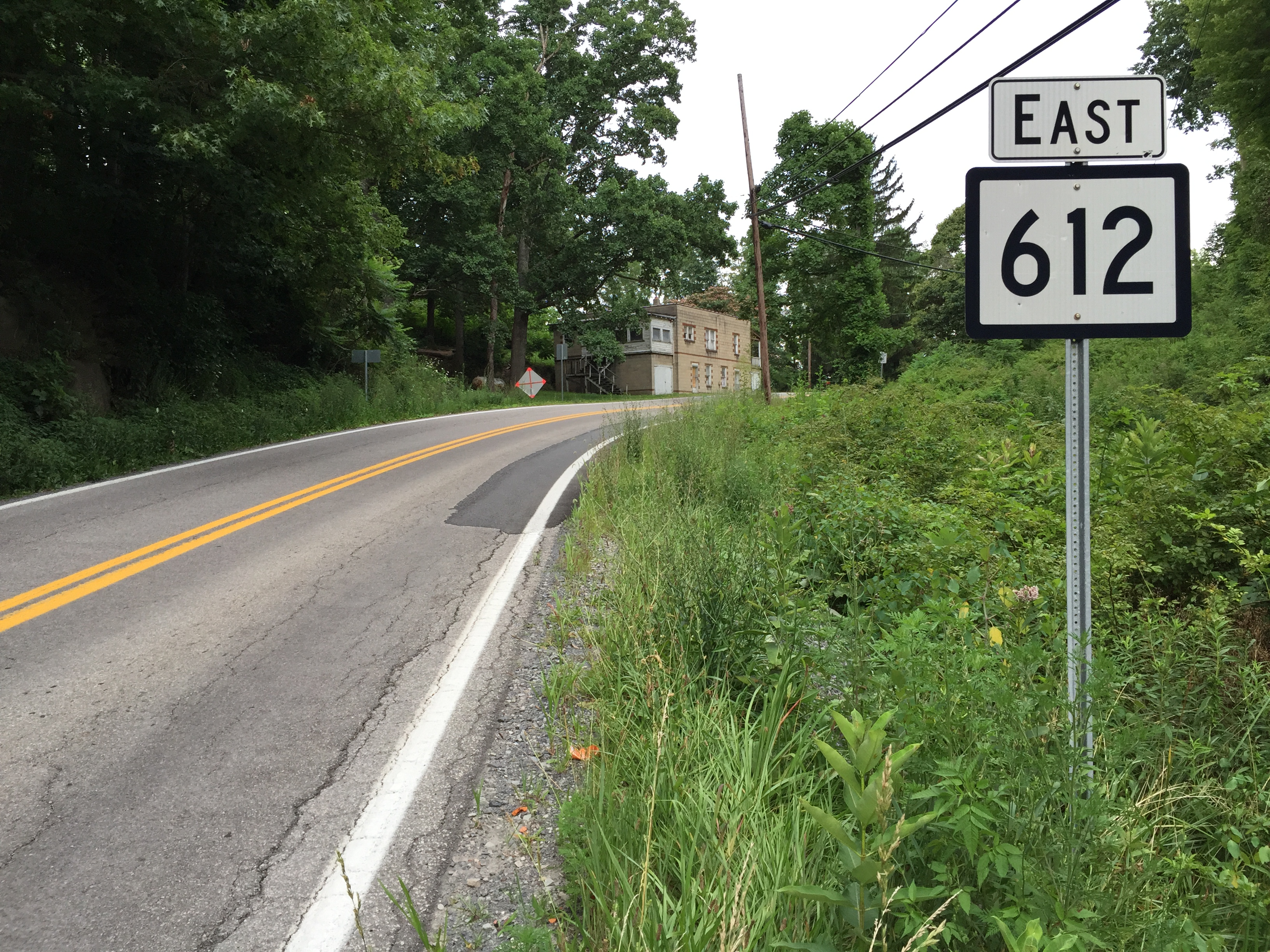
View east along WV 612 at CR 15/2 in Carlisle

West Virginia Route 612 is an east–west state highway in Fayette County, West Virginia. The western terminus of the route is at Interstate 64 and Interstate 77 southeast of Mossy. The eastern terminus is at U.S. Route 19 south of Oak Hill.

== History ==
Prior to becoming a state route, the road was known as County Route 61/2.

== Major intersections ==
The entire route is in Fayette County.

Location	mi	km	Destinations	Notes
	0.00	0.00	I-64 / I-77 / CR 15/4 (Bishops Branch Road) – Charleston, Beckley	I-77 exit 60
	8.40	13.52	US 19 – Summersville, Beckley	
1.000 mi = 1.609 km; 1.000 km = 0.621 mi
