= Gardner, West Virginia =

Gardner, West Virginia may refer to:

- Gardner, Greenbrier County, West Virginia, an unincorporated community in Greenbrier County
- Gardner, Mercer County, West Virginia, an unincorporated community in Mercer County
