= West Virginia Route 114 =

State highway in West Virginia, United States

West Virginia Route 114

Route information
- Maintained by WVDOH
- Length: 7.94 mi (12.78 km)

Major junctions
- South end: US 60 in Charleston
- I-64 / I-77 in Charleston; US 119 in Big Chimney
- North end: I-79 near Big Chimney

Location
- Country: United States
- State: West Virginia
- Counties: Kanawha

Highway system
- West Virginia State Highway System; Interstate; US; State
← WV 112	→ WV 115

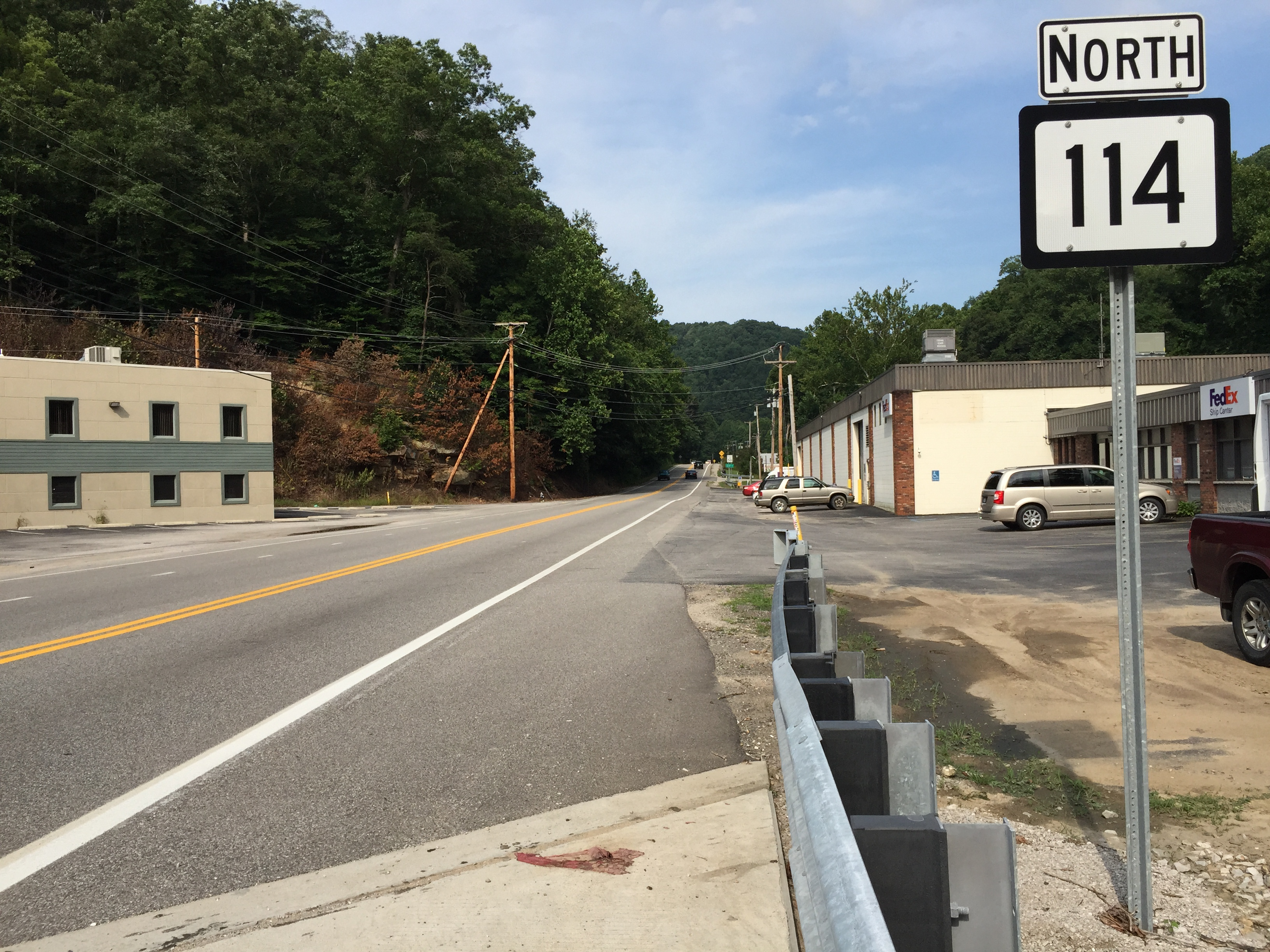
View north along WV 114 just east of Airport Road in Etowah

West Virginia Route 114 (WV 114) is a north–south state highway located in the Charleston, West Virginia area. The southern terminus of the route is at U.S. Route 60 (US 60; Washington Street) east of downtown Charleston. The northern terminus of the route is at Interstate 79 (I-79) north of Big Chimney.

WV 114 south of US 119 was formerly part of WV 14, as was WV 214.

== Route description ==
WV 114 begins at US 60 (Washington Street) adjacent to the West Virginia Cultural Center and West Virginia State Capitol in Charleston. It proceeds north as a four-lane highway, interchanging with I-64/I-77 at a three-level junction. WV 114 assumes steep grades with varying curves until the junction with Yeager Airport's access road, where it becomes two lanes to its terminus at I-79 near Big Chimney.

== Attractions ==
- Charleston
  - West Virginia Cultural Center
  - West Virginia State Capitol

== Major intersections ==
The entire route is in Kanawha County.

Location	mi	km	Destinations	Notes
Charleston	0.0	0.0	US 60 (Washington Street / Greenbrier Street)	
Charleston	0.2	0.32	I-64 / I-77 to I-79 – Parkersburg, Huntington, Beckley, Downtown Charleston	I-77 exit 99
Charleston	1.8	2.9	Yeager Airport (Airport Road)	
Milliken	6.3	10.1	CR 49 (Indian Creek Road) – Pinch	
Big Chimney	6.5	10.5	US 119 – Crede, Big Chimney	
	7.23	11.64	CR 41 (Coopers Creek Road)	
	7.38	11.88	I-79 / CR 27 (Mile Fork Road) – Charleston, Clarksburg	I-79 exit 5
1.000 mi = 1.609 km; 1.000 km = 0.621 mi
