= West Virginia Route 112 =

State highway in West Virginia, United States

West Virginia Route 112

Route information
- Maintained by WVDOH
- Length: 14.0 mi (22.5 km)

Major junctions
- West end: US 19 near Bluefield
- I-77 in Ingleside
- East end: US 460 / CR 3/5 in Oakvale

Location
- Country: United States
- State: West Virginia
- Counties: Mercer

Highway system
- West Virginia State Highway System; Interstate; US; State
| ← WV 108 | → WV 114 |

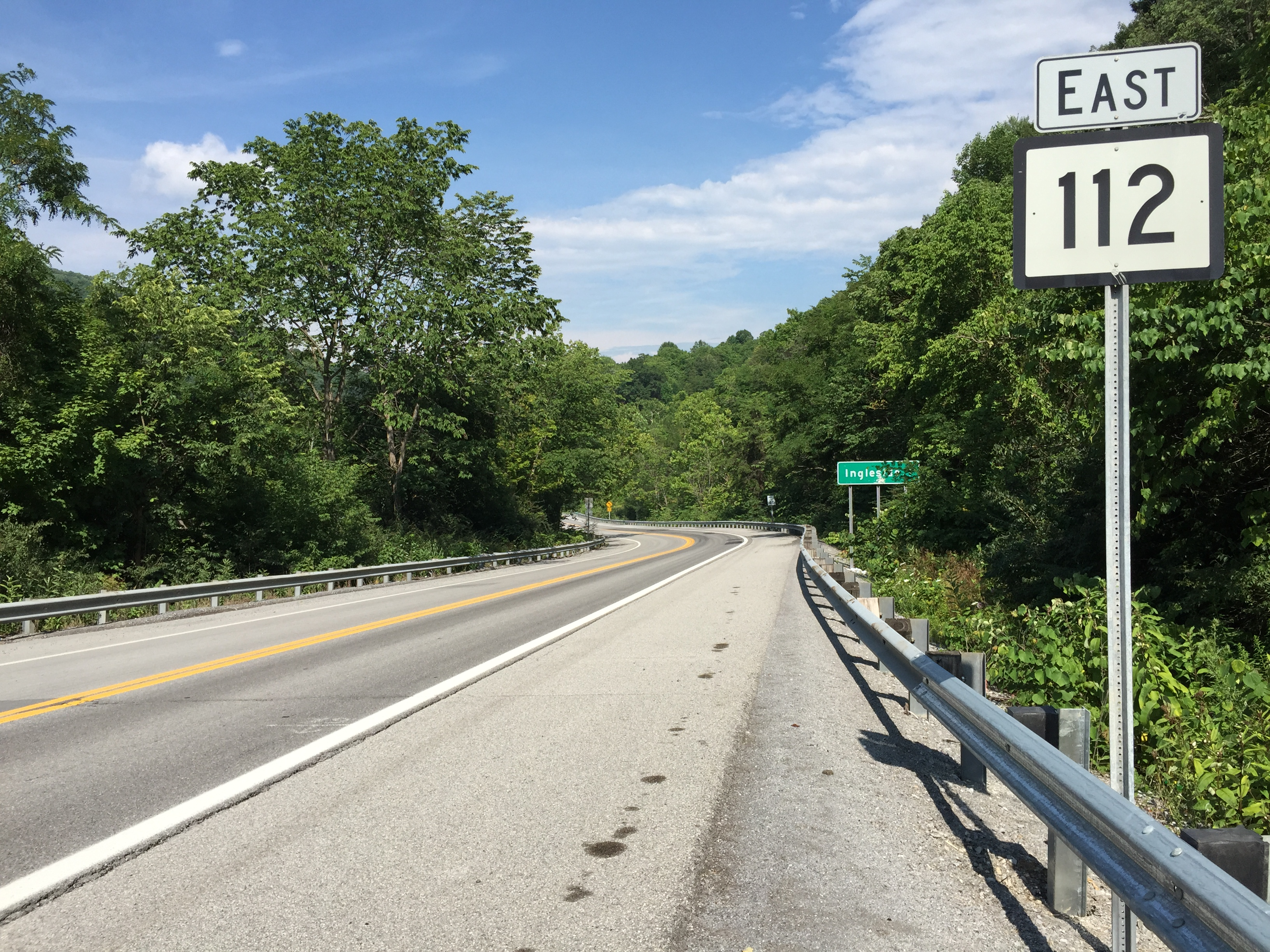
View east along WV 112 at I-77 in Ingleside

West Virginia Route 112 is an east–west state highway in southern West Virginia. The western terminus is at U.S. Route 19 east of Bluefield, in the shadow of a "bridge to nowhere" on the future King Coal Highway. The eastern terminus is at U.S. Route 460 in Oakvale.

WV 112 was formerly a portion of WV 12.

== Major intersections ==
The entire route is in Mercer County.

| Location | mi | km | Destinations | Notes |
|---|---|---|---|---|
| | | | US 19 – Bluefield | |
| | | | I-77 north – Beckley | I-77 exit 5 |
| | | | US 460 / CR 3/5 (Goodwins Chapel Road) – Bluefield, Pearisburg, VA | interchange |
1.000 mi = 1.609 km; 1.000 km = 0.621 mi
