= Big Chimney, West Virginia =

Big Chimney
- Census-designated place (CDP)
- Location in Kanawha County and state of West Virginia.
- Coordinates: 38°24′20″N 81°32′08″W
- Country: United States
- State: West Virginia
- County: Kanawha

Area
  - Total: 2.059 sq mi (5.33 km^{2})
  - Land: 2.003 sq mi (5.19 km^{2})
  - Water: 0.056 sq mi (0.15 km^{2})

Population (2020)
  - Total: 629
  - Density: 314/sq mi (121/km^{2})
- Time zone: UTC-5 (Eastern (EST))
  - Summer (DST): UTC-4 (EDT)
- ZIP codes: 25302
- Area codes: 304, 681
- GNIS feature ID: 1535959
- Highways: I-77; US 119; WV 114

Big Chimney is a census-designated place (CDP) located on U.S. Route 119 in Kanawha County, West Virginia, United States. As of the 2020 census, its population was 629 (slightly up from 627 at the 2010 census). It is accessible by West Virginia Route 114 or exit 5 from I-79. The town is named after the tall chimney of the local salt works, which was a prominent landmark.

== Education ==
The Big Chimney area is served by Kanawha County Schools.
