= Mahan, West Virginia =

- Unincorporated community
- Location within West Virginia Location within the United States
- Coordinates: 38°01′22″N 81°21′18″W
- Country: United States
- State: West Virginia
- County: Fayette
- Elevation: 945 ft (288 m)
- Time zone: UTC-5 (Eastern (EST))
  - Summer (DST): UTC-4 (EDT)
- Area codes: 304 & 681
- GNIS feature ID: 1555024

Mahan is an unincorporated community in Fayette County, West Virginia, United States. Mahan is located off exit 66 of the West Virginia Turnpike.

The community was named after Peter Mahan, a businessperson in the lumber industry.

== See also ==
- List of ghost towns in West Virginia
