= Sharon, West Virginia =

- Unincorporated community
- Location in West Virginia and the United States Sharon (the United States)
- Coordinates: 38°09′34″N 81°26′49″W
- Country: United States
- State: West Virginia
- County: Kanawha
- Elevation: 673 ft (205 m)
- Time zone: UTC-5 (Eastern (EST))
  - Summer (DST): UTC-4 (EDT)
- Area codes: 304 & 681
- GNIS feature ID: 1546622
- Other names: Penn Hollow

Sharon is an unincorporated community and coal town in southeastern Kanawha County, West Virginia, United States, located along the West Virginia Turnpike.

== Geography ==
Sharon is located at 38°09′34″N 81°26′49″W (38.159549, -81.447059) along Cabin Creek. It has an elevation of 673 feet (205 m).

== Transportation ==
Sharon is located on Secondary State Route 79/3, locally known as Cabin Creek Road. Exit 79 of Interstate 77 is located here; no services are available at the exit.

Until the 1980s, a rail spur ran from the CSX railroad tracks up a short hollow, serving a coal mine tipple. The remnants of the tracks and rail bed can still be seen at present day along Paint Branch, however, no sign remains of the at-grade crossing of Cabin Creek Road or the trestle that crossed Cabin Creek.

As a result of the upgrade of the West Virginia Turnpike to Interstate standards, multiple homes occupying the adjacent land were bought by the state and demolished.

Sharon had a United States Post Office until the early 1990s, under the ZIP code 25182.
