= Stanley Bender =

United States Army Medal of Honor recipient (1909–1994)

- Born: October 31, 1909; Carlisle, West Virginia, US
- Died: June 22, 1994 (aged 84); Oak Hill, West Virginia, US
- Burial place: High Lawn Memorial Park, Oak Hill, West Virginia
- Military career
- Allegiance: United States of America
- Branch: United States Army
- Rank: Staff Sergeant
- Units: 7th Infantry Regiment, 3rd Infantry Division
- Conflicts: World War II
- Awards: Medal of Honor

Stanley Bender (October 31, 1909 – June 22, 1994) was a Lithuanian American United States Army soldier and a recipient of the United States military's highest decoration—the Medal of Honor—for his actions in World War II.

== Biography ==
Stanley Bender was born in Carlisle, West Virginia, but later moved with his parents to Chicago, where he worked in slaughterhouses and then as a taxi driver.

Bender joined the Army from Chicago, Illinois in December 1939. By August 17, 1944, was serving as a staff sergeant in Company E, 7th Infantry Regiment, 3rd Infantry Division. On that day, near La Londe-les-Maures, France, he single-handedly silenced two German machine gun emplacements and led his squad in the destruction of the remainder of a German strong point. For these actions, he was awarded the Medal of Honor six months later, on February 1, 1945.

After the war, Bender returned to Chicago. From 1946 to 1949, Stanley Bender was a member of the American Legion's Lithuanian Darius-Girėnas Post and was a member of its command. Thereafter, he was transferred to Beckley, West Virginia for service.

Bender died at age 84 and was buried in High Lawn Memorial Park, Oak Hill, West Virginia.

In 2013, the Darius-Girėnas American Legion Post dedicated a memorial in Bender's honor in front of the post's memorial at Lithuanian National Cemetery in Justice, Illinois.

== Medal of Honor citation ==
Bender's official Medal of Honor citation reads:

For conspicuous gallantry and intrepidity at risk of life above and beyond the call of duty. On 17 August 1944, near La Londe-les-Maures, France, he climbed on top of a knocked-out tank, in the face of withering machinegun fire which had halted the advance of his company, in an effort to locate the source of this fire. Although bullets ricocheted off the turret at his feet, he nevertheless remained standing upright in full view of the enemy for over 2 minutes. Locating the enemy machineguns on a knoll 200 yards away, he ordered 2 squads to cover him and led his men down an irrigation ditch, running a gauntlet of intense machinegun fire, which completely blanketed 50 yards of his advance and wounded 4 of his men. While the Germans hurled hand grenades at the ditch, he stood his ground until his squad caught up with him, then advanced alone, in a wide flanking approach, to the rear of the knoll. He walked deliberately a distance of 40 yards, without cover, in full view of the Germans and under a hail of both enemy and friendly fire, to the first machinegun and knocked it out with a single short burst. Then he made his way through the strong point, despite bursting hand grenades, toward the second machinegun, 25 yards distant, whose 2-man crew swung the machinegun around and fired two bursts at him, but he walked calmly through the fire and, reaching the edge of the emplacement, dispatched the crew. Signaling his men to rush the rifle pits, he then walked 35 yards further to kill an enemy rifleman and returned to lead his squad in the destruction of the 8 remaining Germans in the strong point. His audacity so inspired the remainder of the assault company that the men charged out of their positions, shouting and yelling, to overpower the enemy roadblock and sweep into town, knocking out 2 antitank guns, killing 37 Germans and capturing 26 others. He had sparked and led the assault company in an attack which overwhelmed the enemy, destroying a roadblock, taking a town, seizing intact 3 bridges over the Maravenne River, and capturing commanding terrain which dominated the area.

== Bender Bridge ==
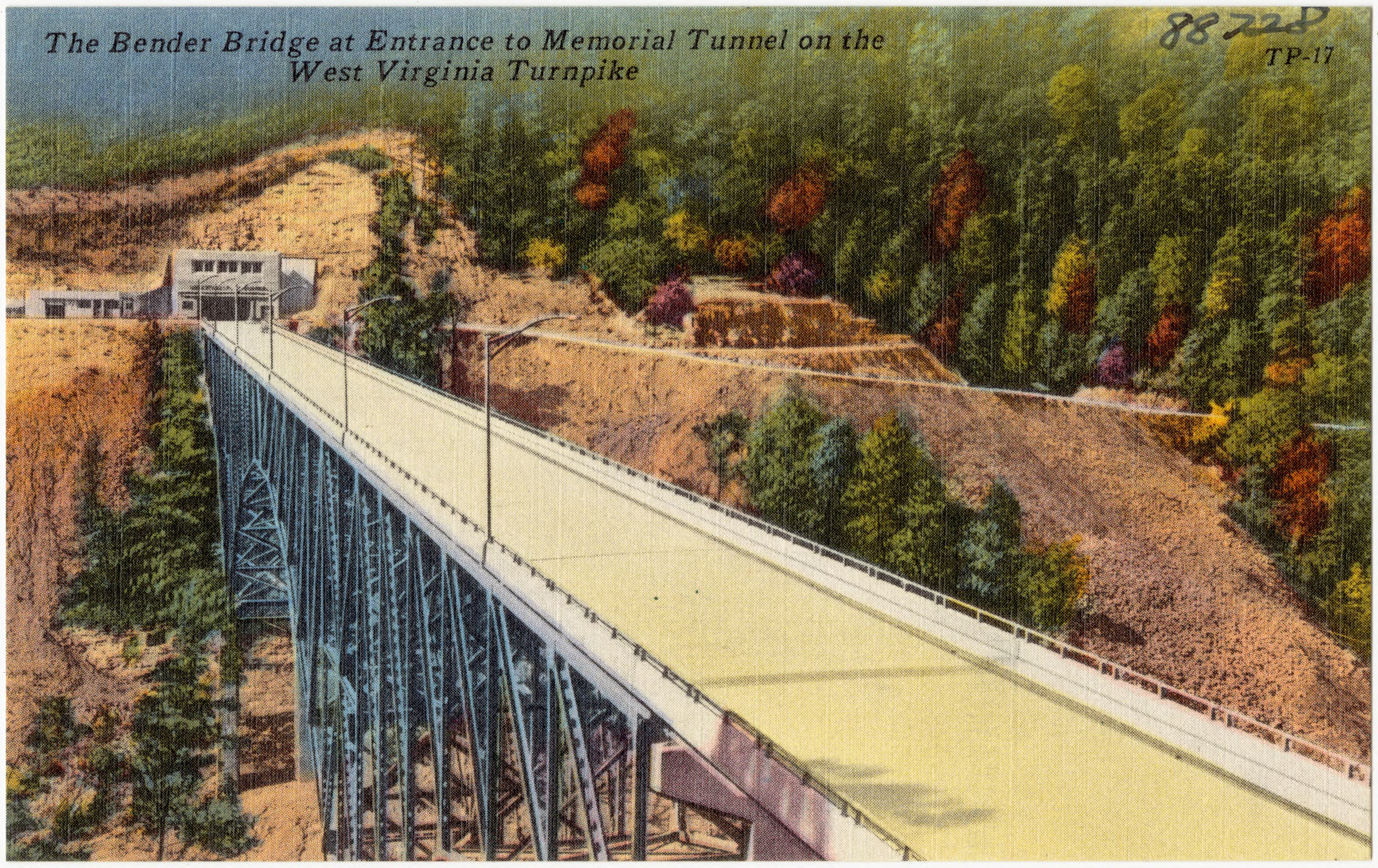
Postcard image of Bender Bridge

On November 9, 1954, a West Virginia Turnpike bridge was dedicated to Bender. It was renamed the Bender Bridge, also known as the Stanley Bender Memorial Bridge. The Bender Bridge was topped with a plaque telling of Bender's heroism during the War. However, the Bender Bridge was demolished by explosives in the 1980s as part of the Memorial Tunnel replacement project, which used an earthen fill to cross Fourmile Fork. Bender said that the bridge might have been demolished, but he would remember it. He also said that memories cannot be destroyed.

== See also ==
- List of Medal of Honor recipients
- List of Medal of Honor recipients for World War II
