= Marietta–Williamstown Interstate Bridge =

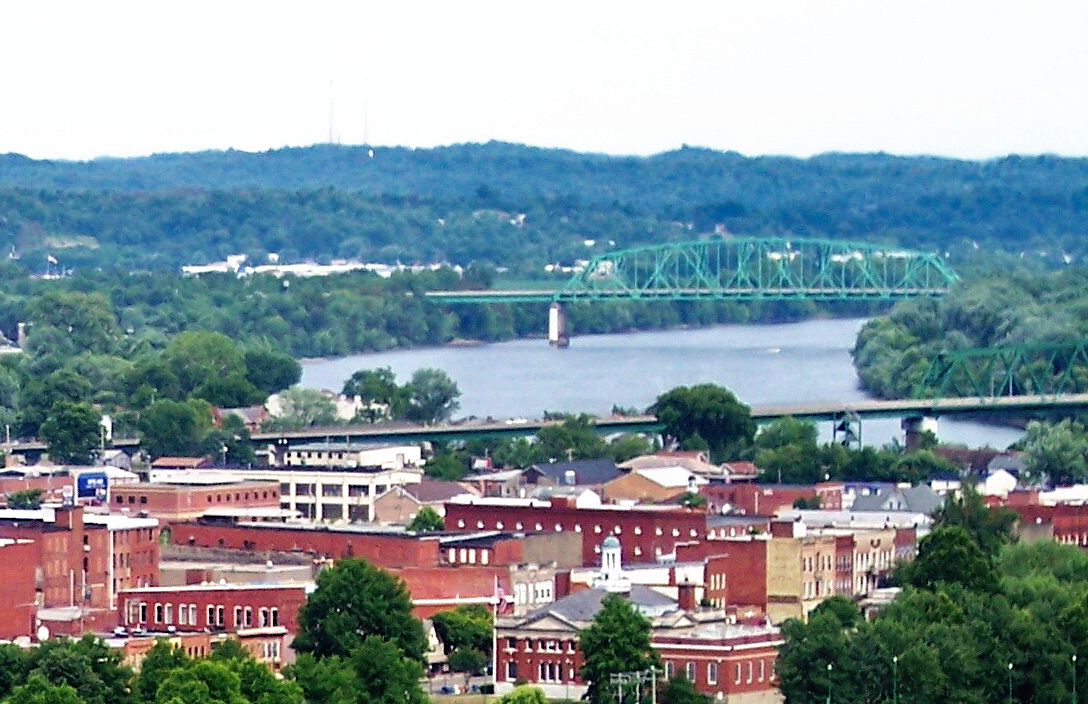
- Coordinates: 39°24′11″N 81°25′52″W
- Carries: 4 lanes of I-77 in West Virginia and Ohio
- Crosses: Ohio River
- Locale: Williamstown, WV – Marietta, OH
- Maintained by: West Virginia Department of Transportation

Characteristics
- Design: Truss bridge

History
- Opened: 1967

Location
- Interactive map of Marietta–Williamstown Interstate Bridge

The Marietta–Williamstown Interstate Bridge is a four-lane truss bridge carries Interstate 77 between Williamstown, West Virginia and Marietta, Ohio. The bridge was completed in 1967 and it was rehabilitated in 2003.

The Interstate 77 span under construction.

== See also ==
- List of crossings of the Ohio River
