= Ingleside, West Virginia =

- Unincorporated community
- Location within the state of West Virginia Ingleside, West Virginia (the United States)
- Coordinates: 37°18′53″N 81°03′08″W
- Country: United States
- State: West Virginia
- County: Mercer
- Elevation: 1,932 ft (589 m)
- Time zone: UTC-5 (Eastern (EST))
  - Summer (DST): UTC-4 (EDT)
- Area codes: 304 & 681
- GNIS feature ID: 1554772

Ingleside is an unincorporated community in Mercer County, West Virginia, United States. Ingleside is located on Interstate 77 and West Virginia Route 112 and is south of Princeton.

== See also ==
- The Wreck of the Virginian
