= Admiral T. J. Lopez Bridge =

Bridge in Chelyan, West Virginia, U.S.

- Coordinates: 38°11′52″N 81°29′47″W
- Carries: 4 lanes
- Crosses: Kanawha River
- Locale: Chelyan, West Virginia
- Other name: Chelyan Bridge
- Owner: West Virginia Department of Transportation

Characteristics
- Design: Truss bridge
- Total length: 2,200 feet (670 m)
- Longest span: 594 feet (181 m)

History
- Designer: HDR Engineering Inc., Pittsburgh
- Construction start: May 1995
- Construction end: 1997
- Construction cost: $25.9 million
- Opened: June 30, 1997

Location
- Interactive map of Admiral T. J. Lopez Bridge

The Admiral T. J. Lopez Bridge is a truss bridge crossing the Kanawha River at Chelyan, West Virginia, named for 4-star admiral Thomas J. Lopez. The Warren truss bridge cost $25.9 million to build, and was opened to traffic on June 30, 1997. It serves as a connection between I-64/I-77 (West Virginia Turnpike), U.S. Route 60 (US 60), and West Virginia Route 61 (WV 61).

== History ==
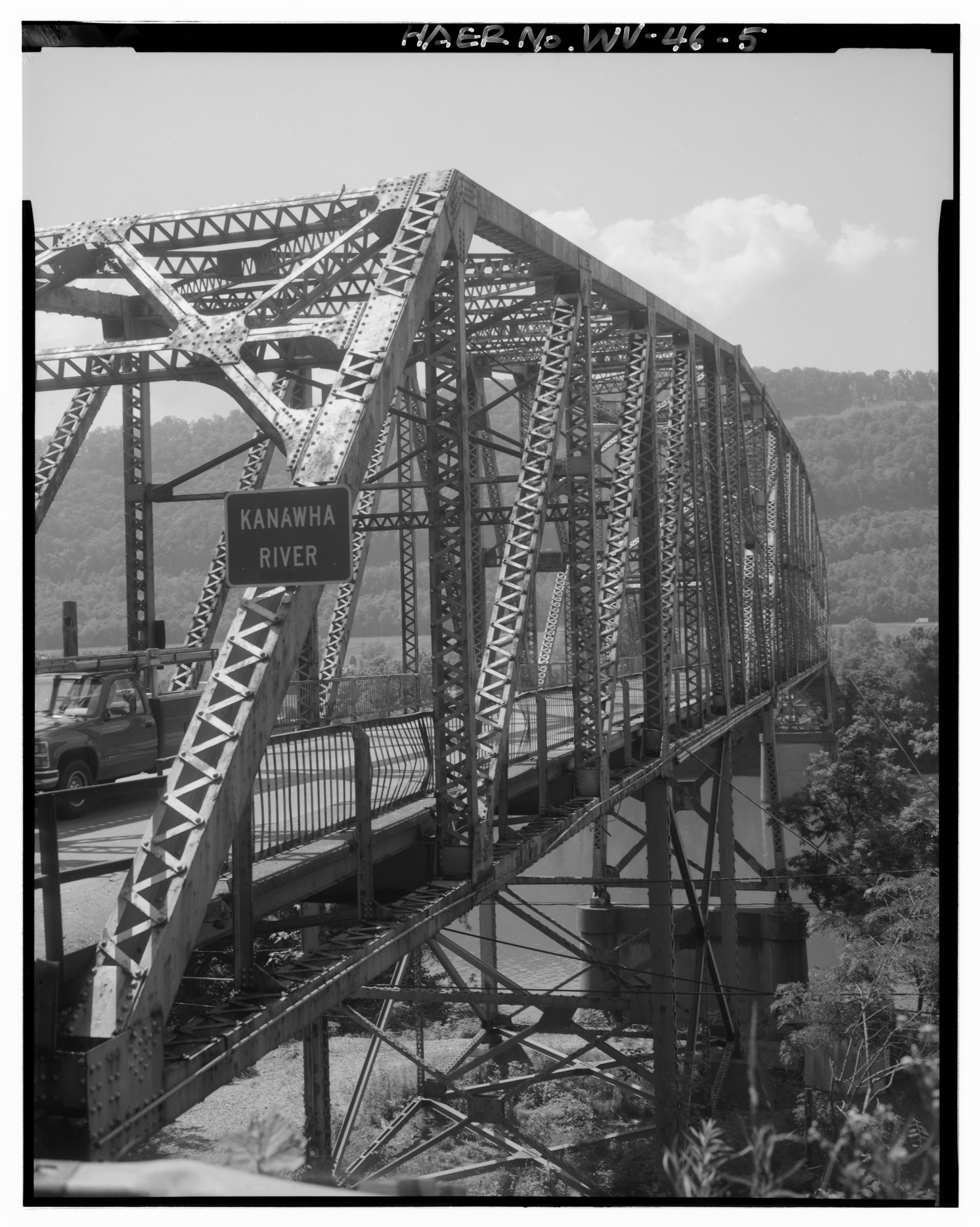
The old Chelyan Bridge in 1993

The current bridge replaced an earlier crossing known as the Chelyan Bridge. Initially a toll crossing constructed for the Midland Trail-James River Bridge Company in 1928-29, this bridge consisted of 17 riveted steel truss and girder spans with a total length of 1,355 feet (413 m). The main span over the navigable channel was a 450-foot-long (140 m) cantilever truss with 200-foot (61 m) side spans. It was sold to the state of West Virginia in 1946 and, despite several rehabilitation projects over the years, continuing deterioration of the bridge required a load limit to be imposed. The bridge was documented by the West Virginia Division of Highways for the Historic American Engineering Record in 1993 prior to its replacement.

== See also ==
- List of bridges documented by the Historic American Engineering Record in West Virginia
