= Fairplain, West Virginia =

Unincorporated community in West Virginia, United States

- Unincorporated community
- Location within West Virginia Location within the United States
- Coordinates: 38°45′09″N 81°41′09″W
- Country: United States
- State: West Virginia
- County: Jackson
- Elevation: 755 ft (230 m)
- Time zone: UTC-5 (Eastern (EST))
  - Summer (DST): UTC-4 (EDT)
- Area codes: 304 & 681
- GNIS feature ID: 1554431

Fairplain is an unincorporated community in Jackson County, West Virginia, United States. Fairplain is located along Interstate 77, 5 miles (8.0 km) south-southeast of Ripley.

The community was so named on account of the "fair plains" near the original town site.
