= Silverton, West Virginia =

- Unincorporated community
- Location within West Virginia Location within the United States
- Coordinates: 38°55′34″N 81°43′20″W
- Country: United States
- State: West Virginia
- County: Jackson
- Elevation: 620 ft (190 m)
- Time zone: UTC-5 (Eastern (EST))
  - Summer (DST): UTC-4 (EDT)
- Area codes: 304 & 681
- GNIS feature ID: 1555627

Silverton is an unincorporated community in Jackson County, West Virginia, United States. Silverton is located at the junction of Interstate 77, U.S. Route 33 and West Virginia Route 2, 3 miles (4.8 km) southeast of Ravenswood.

An early variant name was Franklin.
