= Tamarack Marketplace =

Coordinates: 37°48′5.2″N 81°13′3.3″W

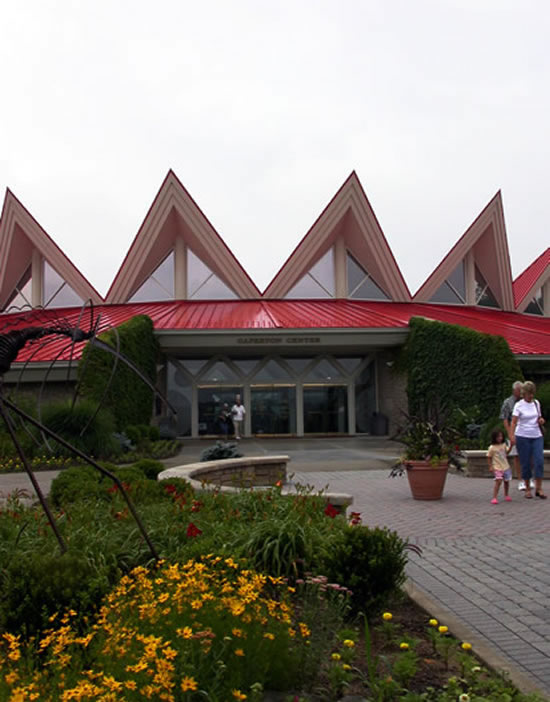
- Tamarack at the Beckley Service Area in Beckley, West Virginia.
- Interactive map of the Tamarack Marketplace area

General information
- Architectural style: Postmodernism
- Location: One Tamarack Park, Beckley, West Virginia, United States
- Groundbreaking: August 8, 1994
- Completed: 1996
- Owner: West Virginia Parkways Authority

Design and construction
- Architects: Clint Bryan & Associates
- Main contractor: Radford and Radford

Website
- https://www.tamarackwv.com/

Tamarack Marketplace is a marketplace in Beckley, West Virginia run by the West Virginia Parkways, Economic Development and Tourism Authority. Tamarack sells local artisan goods made from materials such as wood, glass, textiles, pottery, metal, jewelry, as well as food, art, books and recordings. There are five resident artisan studios, as well as craft demonstrations which take place most weekends from spring through fall.

== History ==
Tamarack was conceived in 1989 under the administration of Governor Gaston Caperton with a $143 million bond (equivalent to $314 million in 2024) issued by the Parkways, Economic Development and Tourism Authority. Planning for the facility and statewide scouting of artisans was conducted by Celia Burge, the state director of economic development and tourism. The Charleston-based architecture firm of Clint Bryan, Doug Bastian, and John Harris was awarded the contract for its architectural design in May 1993. Groundbreaking of Tamarack occurred on August 8, 1994, and the marketplace opened 1996. Tamarack considered itself as being the first statewide collection of "handmade crafts, arts and cuisine" in the United States. In 2003, it added a conference center.

== Economic impact and contribution to the state ==
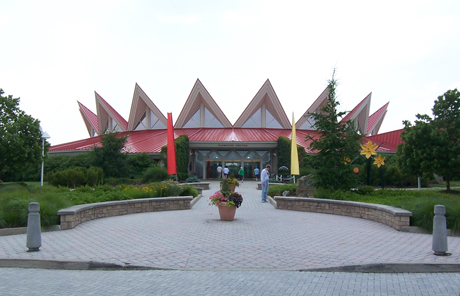
A frontal view of Tamarack.

In January 2007, the Tamarack Foundation said that the market generated over $70 million per year from craft and food sales, along with having 80 full-time employees. In February 2009, that foundation released findings from a study conducted by Marshall University's Center for Business and Economic Research which showed that the market contributed $18.6 million to the state's economy during the 2008 fiscal year, along with supporting 236 full-time equivalent jobs, and was responsible for generating more than $750,000 per year in state and local taxes, not including over $400,000 per year in sales tax which is returned to the state.

The $1.2-million payment for Tamarack's construction bonds were defeased (escrowed for payoff) in August 2009, significantly reducing its operating deficit.

== Audit ==
On January 8, 2007, a report from the West Virginia Performance Evaluation and Review Division (PERD) stated that Tamarack had been running a deficit for several years. According to the report, Tamarack cost the West Virginia Parkways, Economic Development and Tourism Authority (which operates the West Virginia Turnpike and Tamarack) $2 million to $3 million annually.

Supporters criticized the PERD report as being biased, stating that Tamarack could not be judged based solely on profit from Turnpike motorists. One artist there said that the report ignored sales to wholesalers and to other businesses, and also ignored derived economic benefits, such as increasing tourism to nearby locations like Winterplace Ski Resort and New River Gorge National Park and Preserve. Meanwhile, a business owner there said that it improved West Virginia's image.

As Greg Barr, General Manager of the West Virginia Parkways Authority (which oversees Tamarack) said,

"Tamarack is not just a business. That's where they're missing the mark. It's there to support and nurture the artisan industry [...]. It's a benefit that should not be solely determined by what the bottom line of that bricks and mortar facility is."
