= Camp Creek, West Virginia =

Unincorporated community in West Virginia, United States

- Unincorporated community
- Location within the state of West Virginia Camp Creek, West Virginia (the United States)
- Coordinates: 37°29′43″N 81°06′10″W
- Country: United States
- State: West Virginia
- County: Mercer
- Elevation: 2,051 ft (625 m)
- Time zone: UTC-5 (Eastern (EST))
  - Summer (DST): UTC-4 (EDT)
- Area codes: 304 & 681
- GNIS feature ID: 1536906

Camp Creek is an unincorporated community in Mercer County, West Virginia, United States. Camp Creek is located along Interstate 77 (I-77) and U.S. Route 19 (US 19), north of Princeton. Camp Creek has the ZIP code 25820.
