= Chris Massey =

American football player (born 1979)

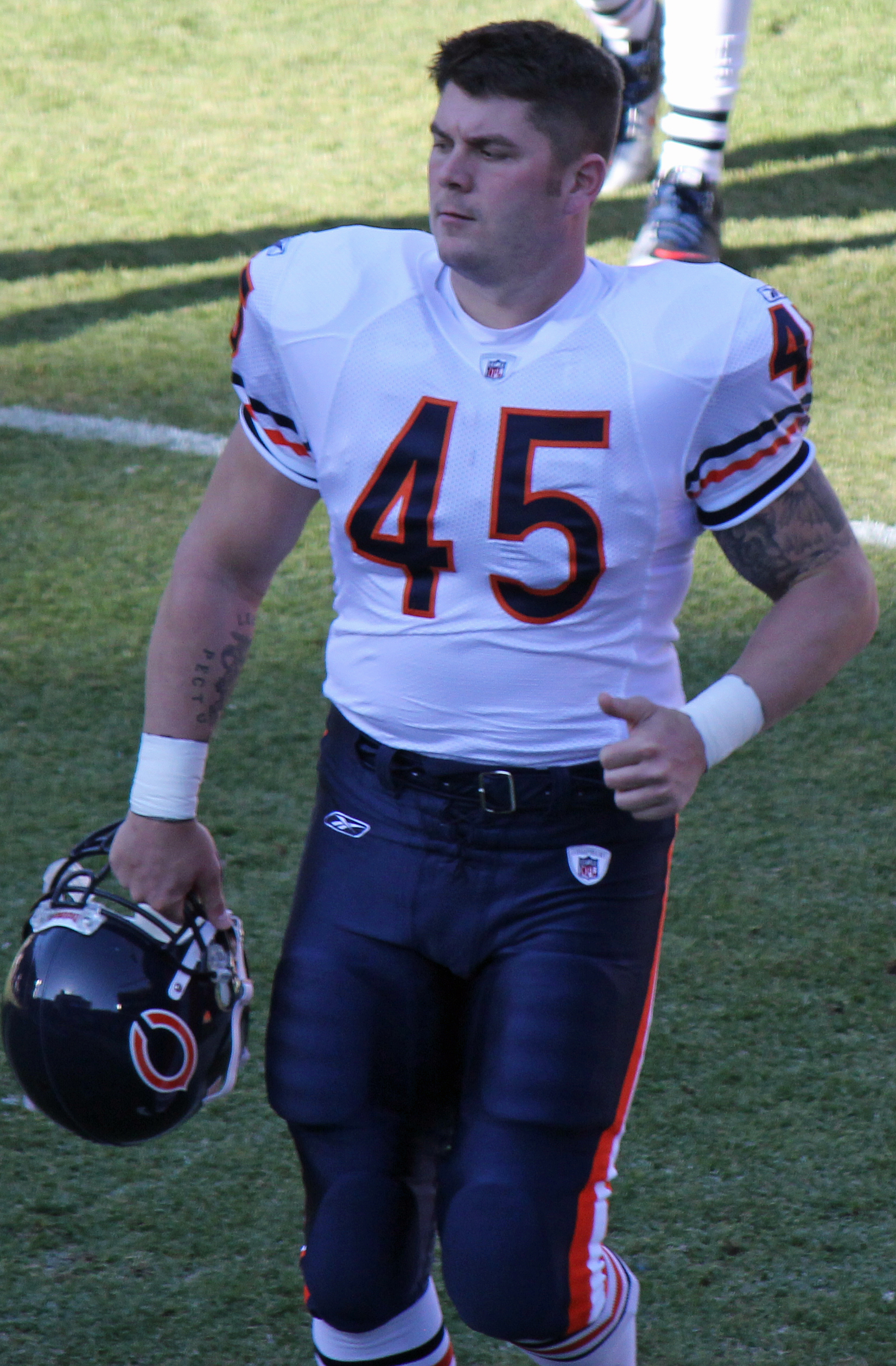
- Massey with the Chicago Bears in 2011

No. 45
- Position: Long snapper

Personal information
- Born: November 21, 1979 (age 46); Chesapeake, West Virginia, U.S.
- Listed height: 6 ft 0 in (1.83 m)
- Listed weight: 245 lb (111 kg)

Career information
- High school: East Bank (East Bank, West Virginia)
- College: Marshall
- NFL draft: 2002: 7th round, 243rd overall pick

Career history
- St. Louis Rams (2002–2010); Carolina Panthers (2011)*; Chicago Bears (2011)
- * Offseason or practice squad member only

Career NFL statistics
- Games played: 141
- Total tackles: 31
- Fumble recoveries: 2
- Stats at Pro Football Reference

Christopher Todd Massey (born November 21, 1979) is an American former professional football player who was a long snapper in the National Football League (NFL). He was selected by the St. Louis Rams in the seventh round of the 2002 NFL draft. He played college football for the Marshall Thundering Herd. He has also played for the Carolina Panthers and Chicago Bears.

== College career ==
Massey attended Marshall University and was a four-year starter at long snapper. He never missed a snap during his college career and added 12 tackles on coverage units, and 19 more as a senior linebacker. He graduated with a bachelor's degree in Criminal Justice in 2001 and completed a Master's in Sports Administration in 2009.

== Professional career ==
=== St. Louis Rams ===
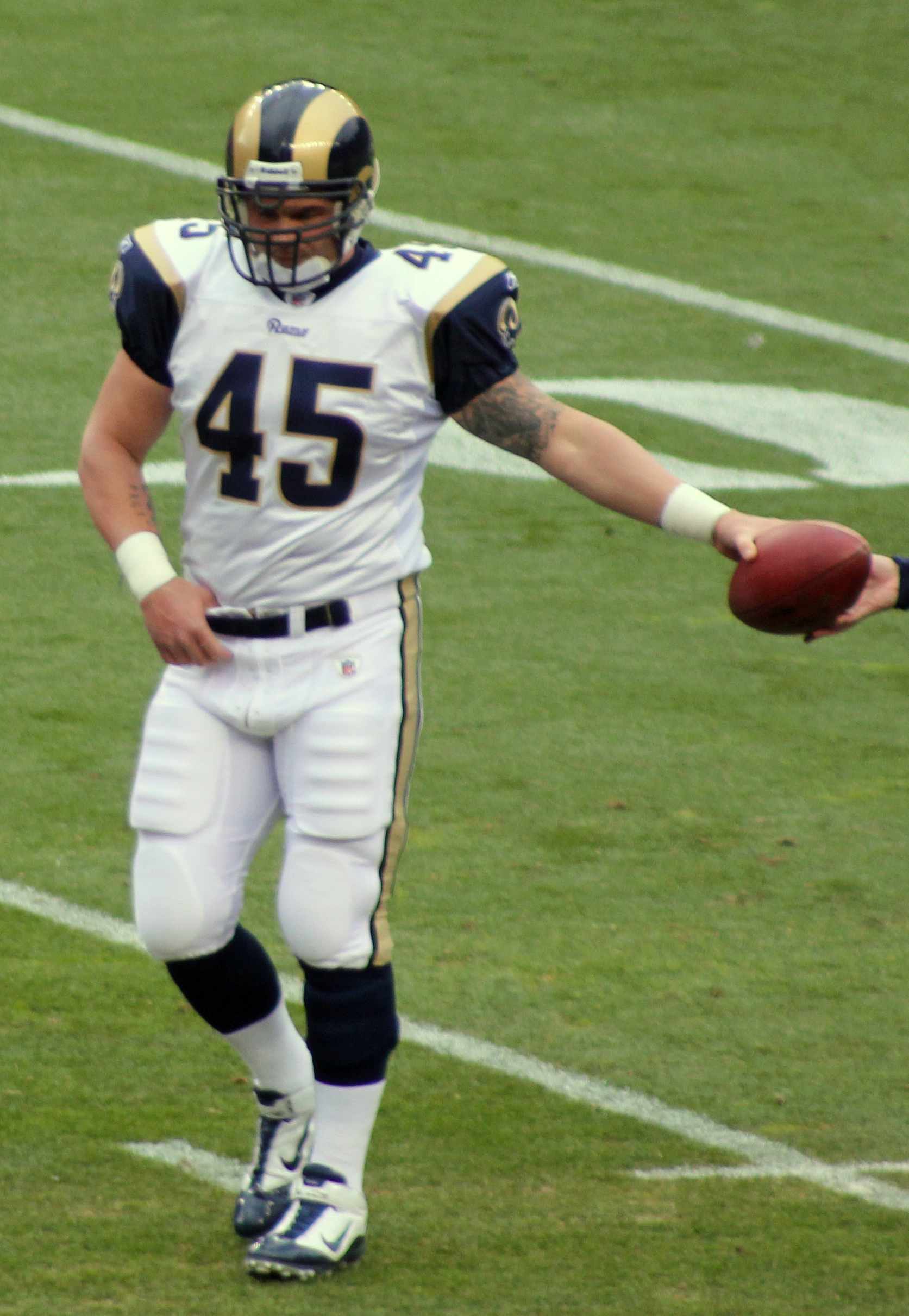
At a game in Denver in November, 2010.

Massey was selected by the St. Louis Rams in the seventh round (243rd overall) in the 2002 NFL draft. During his career he has made clean snaps on 702 out of 703 attempts including a run of 528 consecutive clean snaps.

He was released on August 22, 2011.

=== Carolina Panthers ===
On August 27, 2011, Massey signed with the Carolina Panthers, but was waived on August 30.

=== Chicago Bears ===
On November 24, 2011, Massey signed with the Chicago Bears to replace Patrick Mannelly, lost for the season and placed on injured reserve after rupturing his anterior cruciate ligament against the San Diego Chargers on November 20.
