= Prosperity, West Virginia =

- Census-designated place (CDP)
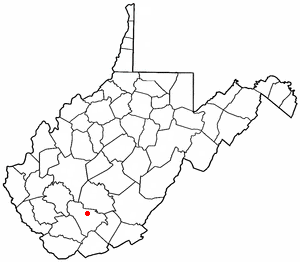
- Location of Prosperity, West Virginia
- Coordinates: 37°50′19″N 81°11′55″W
- Country: United States
- State: West Virginia
- County: Raleigh

Area
  - Total: 2.5 sq mi (6.4 km^{2})
  - Land: 2.5 sq mi (6.4 km^{2})
  - Water: 0 sq mi (0.0 km^{2})
- Elevation: 2,451 ft (747 m)

Population (2020)
  - Total: 1,345
  - Density: 540/sq mi (210/km^{2})
- Time zone: UTC-5 (Eastern (EST))
  - Summer (DST): UTC-4 (EDT)
- ZIP code: 25909
- Area code: 304
- FIPS code: 54-65836
- GNIS feature ID: 2389712

Prosperity is a census-designated place (CDP) in Raleigh County, West Virginia, United States. The population was 1,345 at the 2020 census.

== Geography ==
According to the United States Census Bureau, the CDP has a total area of 2.5 square miles (6.4 km^{2}), all land.

== Demographics ==
Historical population
Census	Pop.	Note	%±
2000	1,310		—
2010	1,498		14.4%
2020	1,345		−10.2%
U.S. Decennial Census

At the 2000 census there were 1,310 people, 570 households, and 395 families living in the CDP. The population density was 840.6 people per square mile (324.2/km^{2}). There were 624 housing units at an average density of 400.4/sq mi (154.4/km^{2}). The racial makeup of the CDP was 98.24% White, 0.92% African American, 0.15% Native American, 0.15% Asian, and 0.53% from two or more races. Hispanic or Latino of any race were 0.53%.

Of the 570 households 27.2% had children under the age of 18 living with them, 54.6% were married couples living together, 11.2% had a female householder with no husband present, and 30.7% were non-families. 28.2% of households were one person and 12.5% were one person aged 65 or older. The average household size was 2.30 and the average family size was 2.81.

The age distribution was 20.5% under the age of 18, 8.3% from 18 to 24, 29.4% from 25 to 44, 27.3% from 45 to 64, and 14.6% 65 or older. The median age was 40 years. For every 100 females, there were 88.5 males. For every 100 females age 18 and over, there were 87.1 males.

The median household income was $31,632 and the median family income was $50,306. Males had a median income of $35,063 versus $26,513 for females. The per capita income for the CDP was $19,552. About 5.6% of families and 6.7% of the population were below the poverty line, including 13.7% of those under age 18 and 5.0% of those age 65 or over.
