= North Hills, West Virginia =

- Town
- Location of North Hills in Wood County, West Virginia.
- Coordinates: 39°18′54″N 81°30′32″W
- Country: United States
- State: West Virginia
- County: Wood
- Incorporated: February 15, 1979

Area
  - Total: 0.57 sq mi (1.47 km^{2})
  - Land: 0.57 sq mi (1.47 km^{2})
  - Water: 0 sq mi (0.00 km^{2})
- Elevation: 787 ft (240 m)

Population (2020)
  - Total: 834
  - Estimate (2021): 827
  - Density: 1,366.6/sq mi (527.63/km^{2})
- Time zone: UTC-5 (Eastern (EST))
  - Summer (DST): UTC-4 (EDT)
- Postal code: 26104
- Area code: 304
- FIPS code: 54-59458
- GNIS feature ID: 2391335
- Website: northhillswv.com

North Hills is a town in Wood County, West Virginia, United States. It is a suburb of Parkersburg. The population was 837 at the 2020 census. North Hills was incorporated on February 15, 1979.

== Geography ==
According to the United States Census Bureau, the town has a total area of 0.56 square miles (1.45 km^{2}), of which 0.55 square miles (1.42 km^{2}) is land and 0.01 square miles (0.03 km^{2}) is water.

== Demographics ==
Historical population
Census	Pop.	Note	%±
1980	940		—
1990	849		−9.7%
2000	880		3.7%
2010	832		−5.5%
2020	834		0.2%
2021 (est.)	827	▼	−0.8%
U.S. Decennial Census

=== 2010 census ===
At the 2010 census there were 832 people, 295 households, and 250 families living in the town. The population density was 1,512.7 inhabitants per square mile (584.1/km^{2}). There were 308 housing units at an average density of 560.0 per square mile (216.2/km^{2}). The racial makeup of the town was 92.3% White, 2.0% African American, 4.6% Asian, 0.2% from other races, and 0.8% from two or more races. Hispanic or Latino of any race were 1.0%.

Of the 295 households 35.3% had children under the age of 18 living with them, 76.3% were married couples living together, 6.4% had a female householder with no husband present, 2.0% had a male householder with no wife present, and 15.3% were non-families. 11.5% of households were one person and 6.7% were one person aged 65 or older. The average household size was 2.82 and the average family size was 3.07.

The median age in the town was 43.3 years. 26.7% of residents were under the age of 18; 6.1% were between the ages of 18 and 24; 20.7% were from 25 to 44; 32.5% were from 45 to 64; and 14.2% were 65 or older. The gender makeup of the town was 50.8% male and 49.2% female.

=== 2000 census ===
At the 2000 census there were 880 people, 294 households, and 264 families living in the town. The population density was 1,589.1 inhabitants per square mile (617.8/km^{2}). There were 301 housing units at an average density of 543.5 per square mile (211.3/km^{2}). The racial makeup of the town was 92.61% White, 0.57% African American, 0.11% Native American, 5.11% Asian, and 1.59% from two or more races. Hispanic or Latino of any race were 1.59%.

Of the 294 households 44.2% had children under the age of 18 living with them, 85.4% were married couples living together, 3.7% had a female householder with no husband present, and 9.9% were non-families. 8.5% of households were one person and 3.7% were one person aged 65 or older. The average household size was 2.99 and the average family size was 3.16.

The age distribution was 30.3% under the age of 18, 4.2% from 18 to 24, 22.4% from 25 to 44, 33.3% from 45 to 64, and 9.8% 65 or older. The median age was 41 years. For every 100 females there were 97.3 males. For every 100 females age 18 and over, there were 97.7 males.

The median household income was $83,659 and the median family income was $85,768. Males had a median income of $71,944 versus $33,125 for females. The per capita income for the town was $31,862. About 1.8% of families and 2.5% of the population were below the poverty line, including 4.2% of those under age 18 and 3.0% of those age 65 or over.
