= Chelyan, West Virginia =

- Census-designated place (CDP)
- Location in Kanawha County and state of West Virginia.
- Coordinates: 38°11′43″N 81°29′27″W
- Country: United States
- State: West Virginia
- County: Kanawha

Area
  - Total: 1.11 km^{2} (0.430 sq mi)
  - Land: 1.04 km^{2} (0.403 sq mi)
  - Water: 0.070 km^{2} (0.027 sq mi)
- Elevation: 188 m (617 ft)

Population (2020)
  - Total: 681
  - Density: 652/km^{2} (1,690/sq mi)
- Time zone: UTC-5 (Eastern (EST))
  - Summer (DST): UTC-4 (EDT)
- Area codes: 304 & 681
- GNIS feature ID: 1537231

Chelyan (/ˈʃiːljən/ SHEEL-yən) is a census-designated place (CDP) in Kanawha County, West Virginia, United States. Chelyan is located on the south bank of the Kanawha River, southeast of Chesapeake. It is served by Exit 85 of the West Virginia Turnpike. As of the 2020 census, its population was 681.

The community has the name of Chelyan Calvert, the child of an early postmaster.

== Notable person ==
Former NBA player, coach, and general manager Jerry West was born in Chelyan.
