= Mack Creek Village, Virginia =

Unincorporated community in Virginia, US

Coordinates: 36°59′07″N 80°41′24″W

Mack Creek Village is an unincorporated community in Pulaski County, in the U.S. state of Virginia.
