= Mossy, West Virginia =

- Unincorporated community
- Location within West Virginia Location within the United States
- Coordinates: 37°58′34″N 81°16′54″W
- Country: United States
- State: West Virginia
- County: Fayette
- Elevation: 1,417 ft (432 m)
- Time zone: UTC-5 (Eastern (EST))
  - Summer (DST): UTC-4 (EDT)
- Area codes: 304 & 681
- GNIS feature ID: 1543600

Mossy is an unincorporated community in Fayette County, West Virginia, United States. Mossy is located off exit 60 on the West Virginia Turnpike and is west of Oak Hill. As of 1993, the community had an Exxon gas station, and motel, all owned by Teddy Gray. The motel has since burned down.
