= Camp Creek State Park =

State Park in Mercer County, West Virginia

Camp Creek State Park and Forest
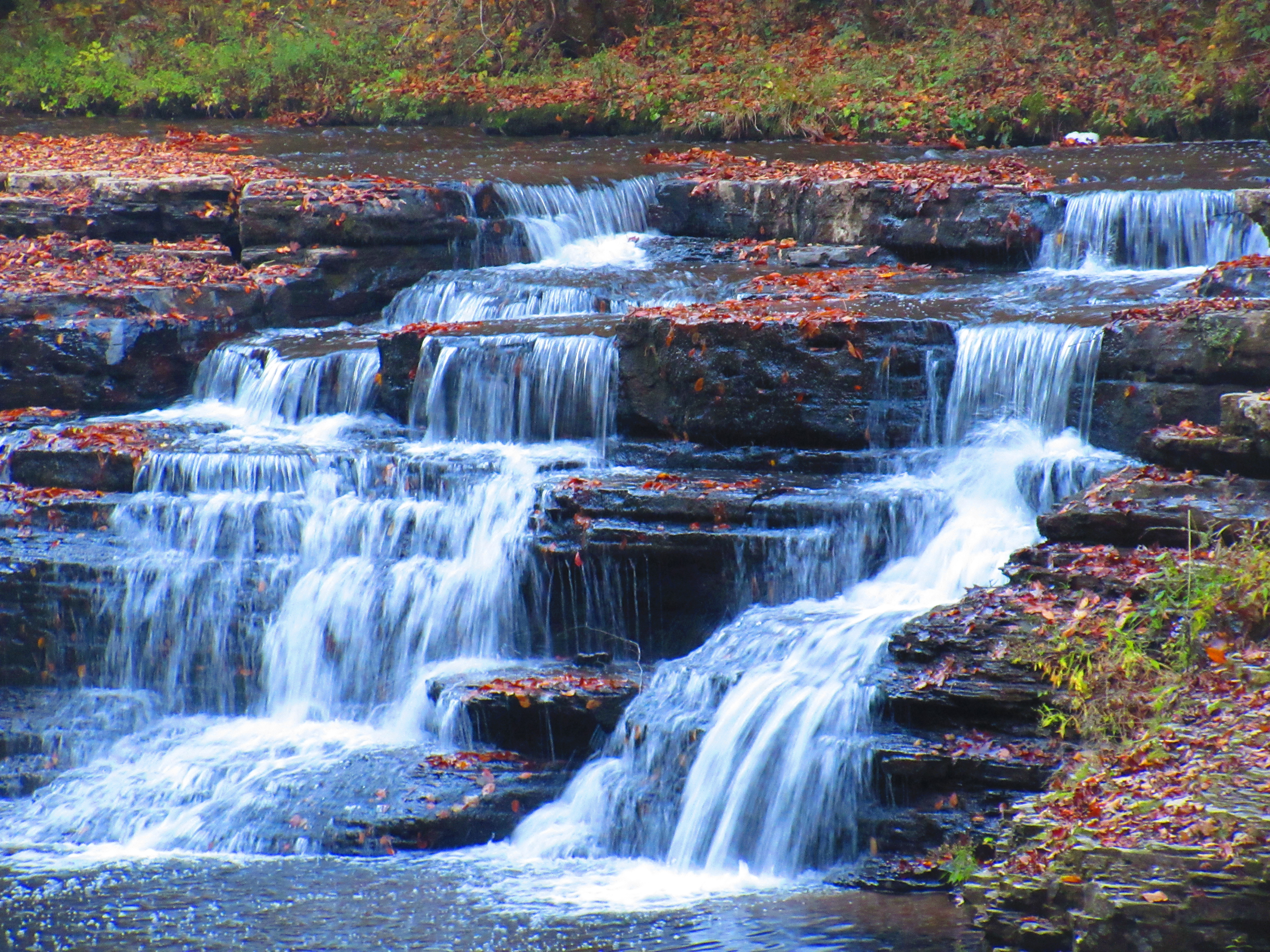
- Campbell Falls is one of two main waterfalls in the park.

- Location within West Virginia
- Location: Mercer County, West Virginia, United States
- Coordinates: 37°30′14″N 81°07′55″W
- Area: 550 acres (220 ha)
- Elevation: 2,037 ft (621 m)
- Established: 1987
- Website: wvstateparks.com/park/camp-creek-state-park-and-forest/

Camp Creek State Park was created in 1987 by dividing the 550-acre (220 ha) area from Camp Creek State Forest. Camp Creek State Park is located about two miles (3 km) from the Camp Creek Exit (Exit 20) of I-77 in Mercer County, West Virginia.

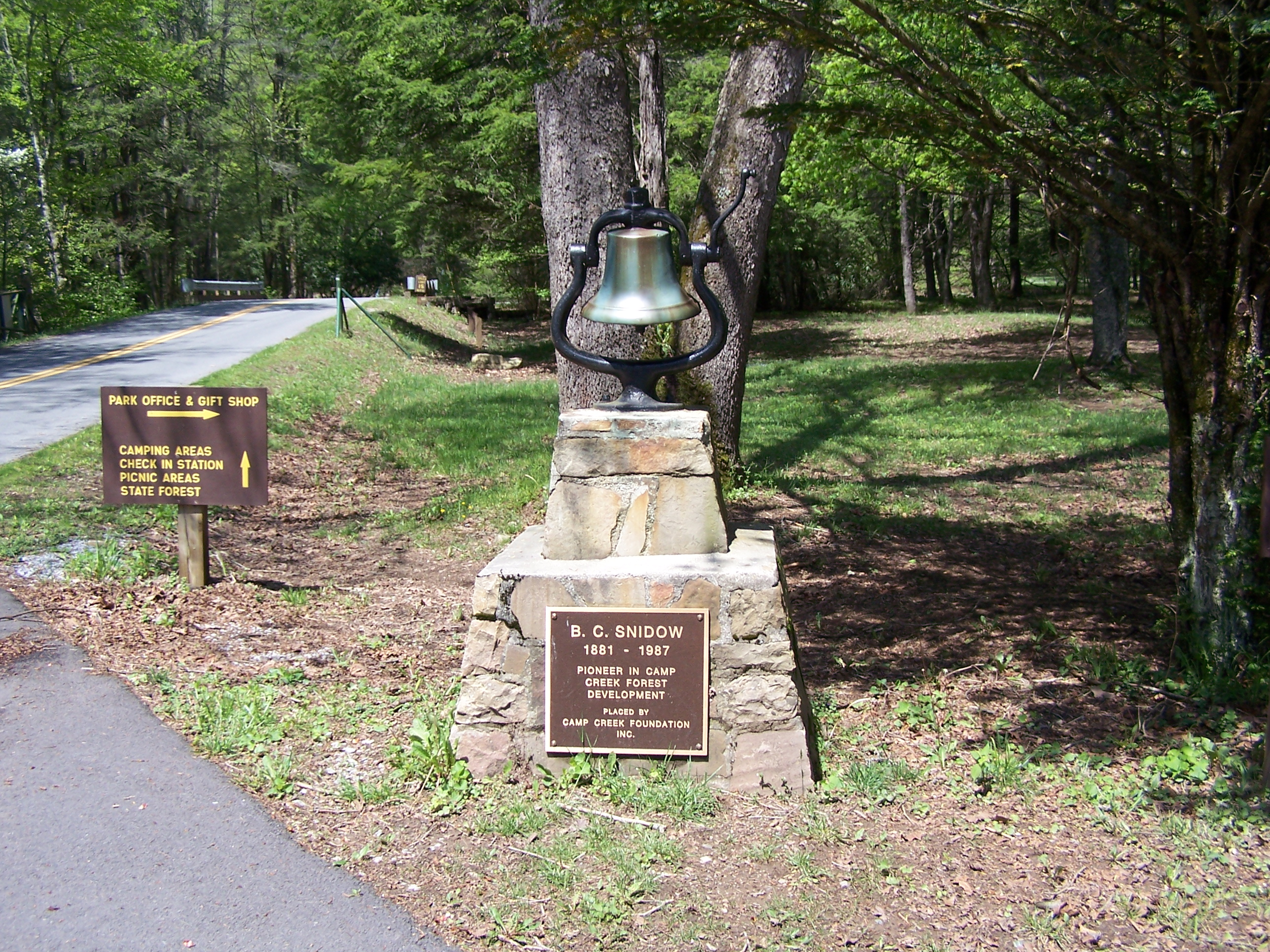
Bell from a Shay locomotive that formerly worked at Camp Creek

== Features ==
- 3 campgrounds
  - Mash Fork - 26 camping sites for tents or trailers
  - Blue Jay - 14 rustic sites
  - Double "C" - Horse and Ride sites
- Picnic area
- Fishing
- Hunting
- Horseback riding

== See also ==
- List of West Virginia state parks
- State park
