= Gardner, Mercer County, West Virginia =

Unincorporated community in West Virginia, United States

Gardner, West Virginia
- Unincorporated community
- Location within the state of West Virginia Gardner, West Virginia (the United States)
- Coordinates: 37°25′25″N 81°04′27″W
- Country: United States
- State: West Virginia
- County: Mercer
- Elevation: 2,362 ft (720 m)
- Time zone: UTC-5 (Eastern (EST))
  - Summer (DST): UTC-4 (EDT)
- Area codes: 304 & 681
- GNIS feature ID: 1554529

Gardner is an unincorporated community in Mercer County, West Virginia, United States. Gardner is located along Interstate 77, 4 miles (6.4 km) north of Princeton. The Gardner Area was home of the Bluestone Land and Lumber Company, the Mercer County Poor Farm, and the Forestry Sciences Laboratory. Organizations that still exist in the Gardner Area include the Mercer County Gardner Center, West Virginia Division of Highways, Pikeview Middle School and Pikeview High School.
