= Kanawha City, Charleston =

Neighborhood of Charleston, Kanawha County, West Virginia

Coordinates: 38°19′17″N 81°34′55″W

Kanawha City is a neighborhood of the city of Charleston in Kanawha County, West Virginia, United States. It is in the southeastern part of the city, and located along WV 61 (MacCorkle Ave.) It officially starts at the 35th Street bridge, where there is a sign welcoming visitors. It comprises mostly small stores and neighborhood/residential on both sides. The stores, malls, and restaurants are mostly located in the southern part of the neighborhood.

Kanawha City was first developed in the 1890's by former West Virginia governor William A. MacCorckle and other businessmen. The town was incorporated into Charleston in 1929.

An early variant name was Owens.

== Points of Interest ==
- Charleston Area Medical Center (CAMC) Memorial Hospital, the largest branch of CAMC, is located in the Kanawha City neighborhood.
- The University of Charleston, a private university, is located in the Kanawha City neighborhood.
- Public schools include Kanawha City Elementary, Chamberlain Elementary, and Horace Mann Middle.
