= 35th Street Bridge =

Bridge in Kanawha county West Virginia, United States of America

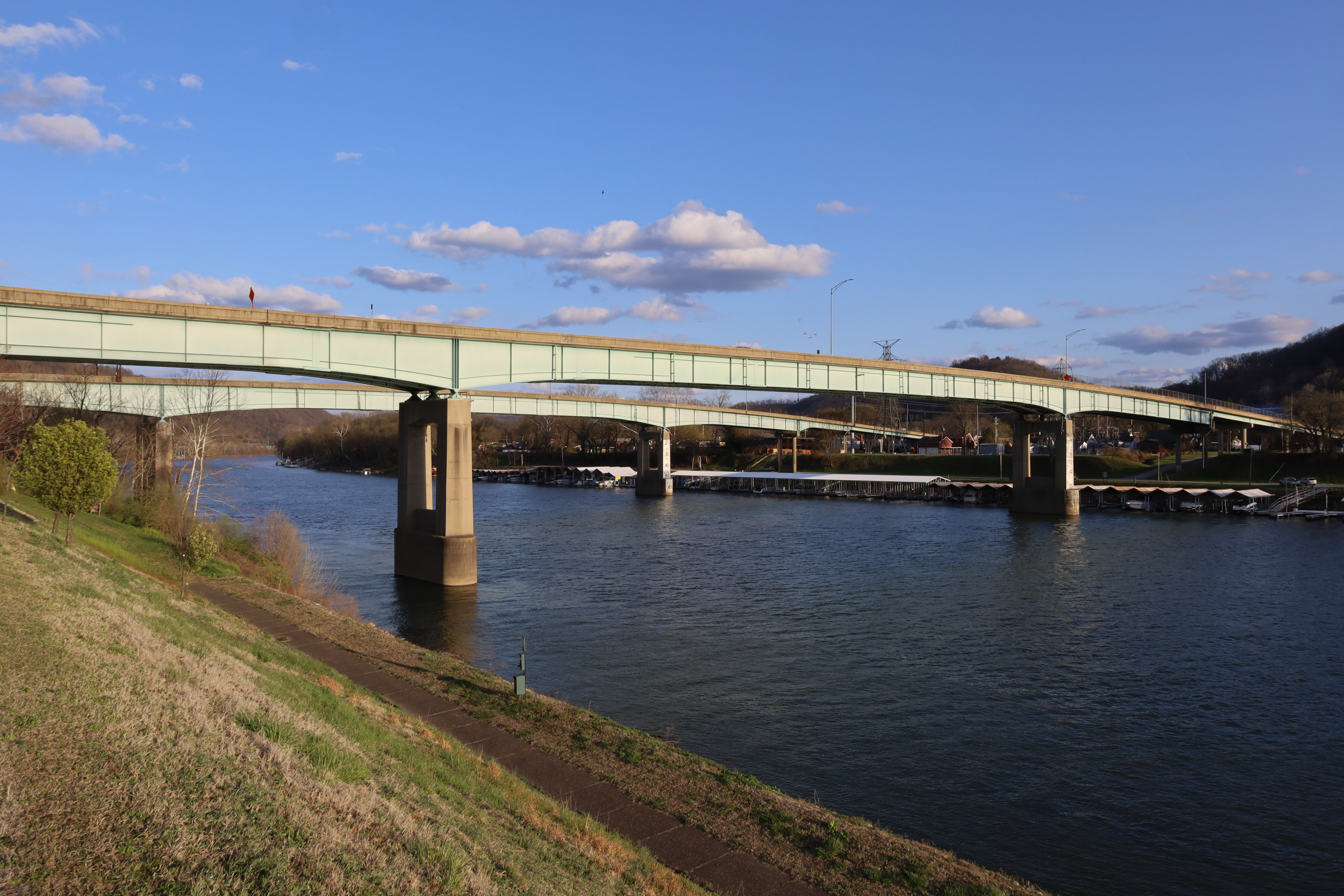
- The bridges in 2022
- Coordinates: 38°19′59″N 81°35′53″W
- Crosses: Kanawha River
- Locale: Charleston, West Virginia

Location
- Interactive map of 35th Street Bridge

The 35th Street Bridge crosses the Kanawha River in Charleston, West Virginia, in the United States. It connects Interstate 64/77 south at Exit 98 with West Virginia Route 61 in northern Kanawha City.

== Sources ==
- Coleman West Virginia Atlas and Gazetteer

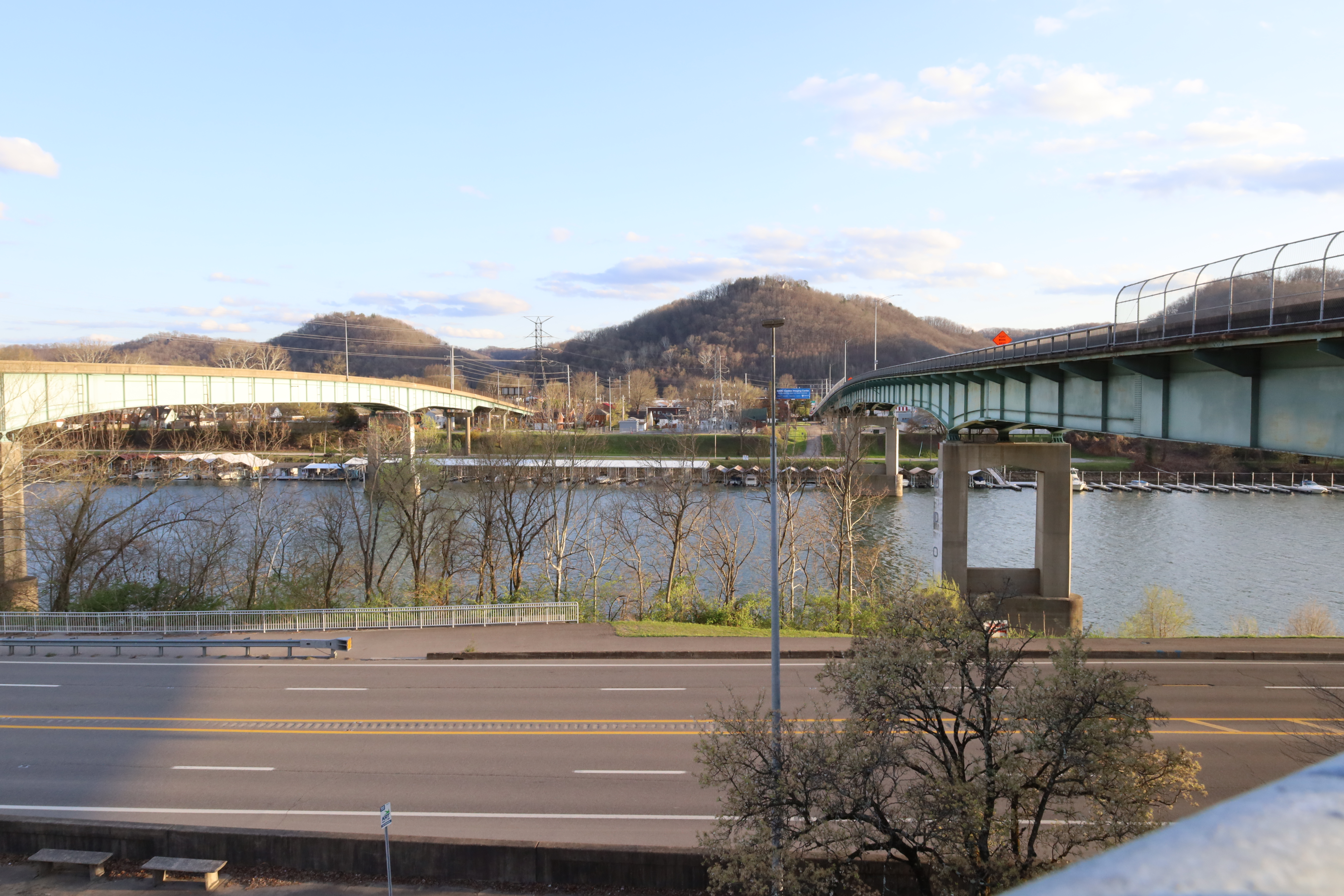
View between the bridges from the pedestrian helix in 2022
