= Chesapeake, West Virginia =

- Town
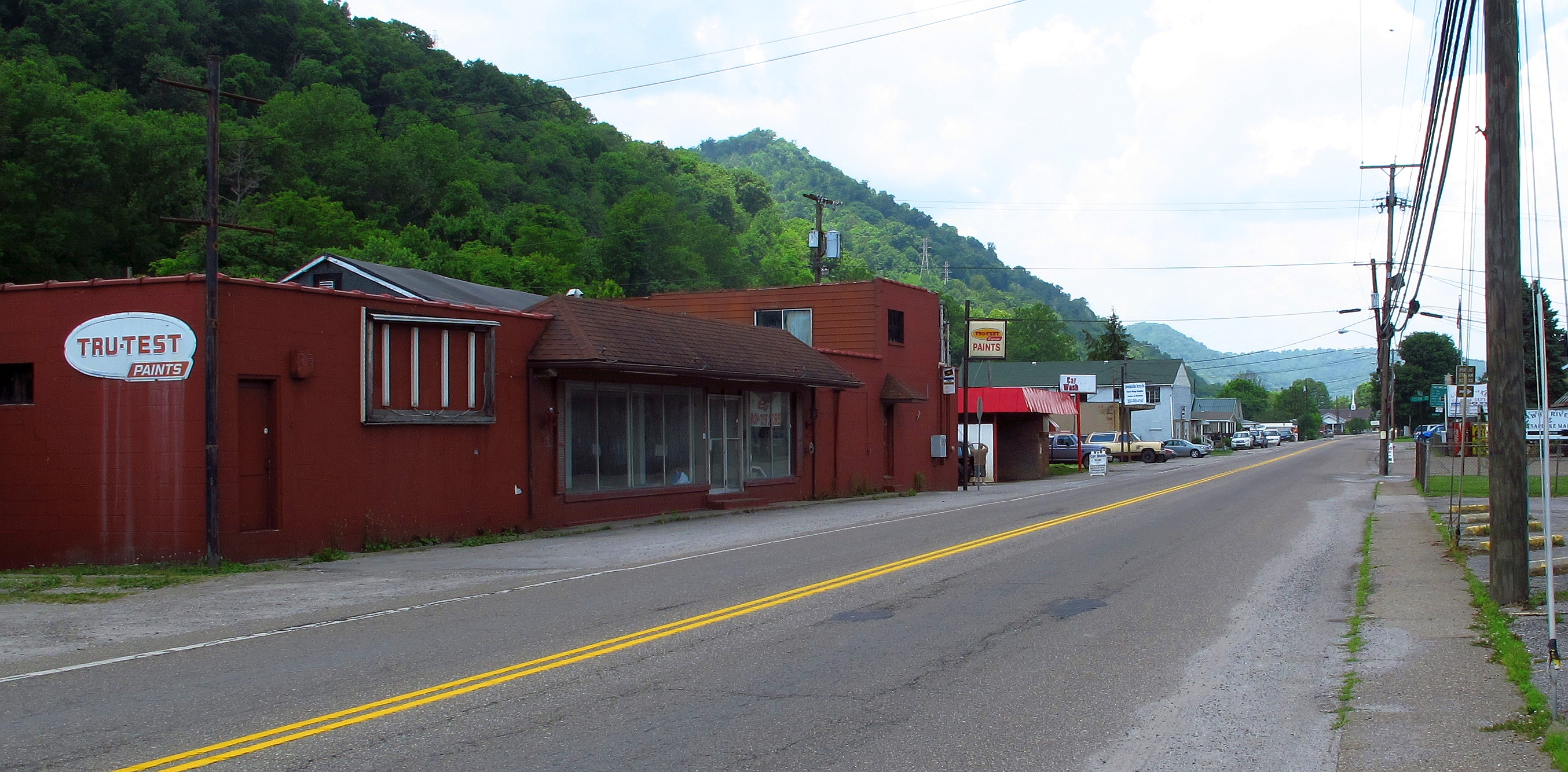
- Maccorkle Avenue in Chesapeake

- Location of Chesapeake in Kanawha County, West Virginia.
- Coordinates: 38°13′21″N 81°32′10″W
- Country: United States
- State: West Virginia
- County: Kanawha
- Incorporated: November 1, 1948

Area
  - Total: 0.64 sq mi (1.66 km^{2})
  - Land: 0.48 sq mi (1.25 km^{2})
  - Water: 0.16 sq mi (0.42 km^{2})
- Elevation: 607 ft (185 m)

Population (2020)
  - Total: 1,335
  - Estimate (2021): 1,313
  - Density: 2,937.4/sq mi (1,134.12/km^{2})
- Time zone: UTC-5 (Eastern (EST))
  - Summer (DST): UTC-4 (EDT)
- Area code: 304
- FIPS code: 54-15028
- GNIS feature ID: 1554120
- Website: https://chesapeake.wv.gov/Pages/default.aspx

Chesapeake is a town in Kanawha County, West Virginia, United States. The population was 1,336 at the 2020 census. The town is situated on the Kanawha River.

== History ==
Chesapeake was incorporated on November 1, 1948, and was named for the Chesapeake and Ohio Railway, which has served the community since 1873.

== Geography ==
According to the United States Census Bureau, the town has a total area of 0.64 square miles (1.66 km^{2}), of which 0.48 square miles (1.24 km^{2}) is land and 0.16 square miles (0.41 km^{2}) is water.

== Demographics ==
Historical population
Census	Pop.	Note	%±
1950	2,566		—
1960	2,699		5.2%
1970	2,428		−10.0%
1980	2,364		−2.6%
1990	1,896		−19.8%
2000	1,643		−13.3%
2010	1,554		−5.4%
2020	1,335		−14.1%
2021 (est.)	1,313	▼	−1.6%
U.S. Decennial Census

=== 2020 Census ===
At the 2020 Census there were 1,336 people, 617 occupied households, and 117 vacant properties in the town. The population density was 2,939.71 inhabitants per square mile (1,135.0/km^{2}).

=== 2010 census ===
At the 2010 census there were 1,554 people, 691 households, and 425 families living in the town. The population density was 3,237.5 inhabitants per square mile (1,250.0/km^{2}). There were 809 housing units at an average density of 1,685.4 per square mile (650.7/km^{2}). The racial makeup of the town was 88.7% White, 9.6% African American, 0.2% Native American, 0.2% from other races, and 1.4% from two or more races. Hispanic or Latino of any race were 0.5%.

Of the 691 households 26.6% had children under the age of 18 living with them, 38.9% were married couples living together, 18.4% had a female householder with no husband present, 4.2% had a male householder with no wife present, and 38.5% were non-families. 33.6% of households were one person and 14.3% were one person aged 65 or older. The average household size was 2.25 and the average family size was 2.84.

The median age in the town was 43.5 years. 20.8% of residents were under the age of 18; 7.3% were between the ages of 18 and 24; 23.6% were from 25 to 44; 30.9% were from 45 to 64; and 17.4% were 65 or older. The gender makeup of the town was 47.1% male and 52.9% female.

=== 2000 census ===
At the 2000 census there were 1,643 people, 750 households, and 480 families living in the town. The population density was 3,487.3 inhabitants per square mile (1,349.7/km^{2}). There were 851 housing units at an average density of 1,806.3 per square mile (699.1/km^{2}). The racial makeup of the town was 88.19% White, 10.04% African American, 0.06% Native American, 0.12% Asian, 0.06% Pacific Islander, 0.37% from other races, and 1.16% from two or more races. Hispanic or Latino of any race were 0.37%.

Of the 750 households 22.8% had children under the age of 18 living with them, 42.3% were married couples living together, 16.9% had a female householder with no husband present, and 35.9% were non-families. 31.5% of households were one person and 15.6% were one person aged 65 or older. The average household size was 2.19 and the average family size was 2.71.

The age distribution was 19.7% under the age of 18, 6.9% from 18 to 24, 25.9% from 25 to 44, 27.1% from 45 to 64, and 20.3% 65 or older. The median age was 43 years. For every 100 females, there were 83.2 males. For every 100 females age 18 and over, there were 80.2 males.

The median household income was $29,526 and the median family income was $35,703. Males had a median income of $30,588 versus $21,458 for females. The per capita income for the town was $16,307. About 14.3% of families and 19.1% of the population were below the poverty line, including 38.9% of those under age 18 and 10.9% of those age 65 or over.

== Government ==
The current mayor of Chesapeake is Melissa J. Hill, effective July 1, 2023.

== Notable people ==
- Chris Massey, long snapper for the St. Louis Rams.
- Donny Kees, musician and songwriter
