= West Virginia Department of Transportation =

Government agency in West Virginia, United States

Agency overview
- Preceding agencies: West Virginia Department of Highways; West Virginia State Road Commission
- Jurisdiction: The state of West Virginia
- Headquarters: State Capitol Complex - Building 5 - 1900 Kanawha Boulevard East - Charleston, West Virginia 25305
- Agency executive: Stephen T. Rumbaugh, P.E. Secretary of Transportation
- Website: transportation.wv.gov

The West Virginia Department of Transportation (WVDOT) is the state agency responsible for transportation in the U.S. state of West Virginia. The Department of Transportation serves an umbrella organization for four subsidiary agencies which are directly responsible for different areas of the state's infrastructure.

== Subsidiary agencies ==
=== Division of Highways ===
The West Virginia Division of Highways (WVDOH) is the largest agency within the West Virginia Department of Transportation (WVDOT). The Division of Highways is responsible for the planning, construction, maintenance, and operation of the majority of public roads in the state. As of the 2024 Federal Highway Administration certification, West Virginia contains 39,138 miles of public roads, including 34,944.8 miles of state-maintained highways, 913.9 miles of federally owned roads, and 3,279.3 miles of municipally owned public roads. WVDOH oversees nearly all public roads outside incorporated municipalities.

Historically, the Division of Highways operated as a standalone agency known as the West Virginia Department of Highways. Prior to that, the state’s highway authority was known as the State Road Commission, which existed from the early 20th century until statewide transportation reforms in the 1970s led to the creation of the modern WVDOT and its internal divisions.

=== Division of Motor Vehicles ===
The West Virginia Division of Motor Vehicles (DMV) handles vehicle registration and driver licensing for the state. In addition to its headquarters in Charleston, it operates a network of 23 regional offices throughout West Virginia.

=== West Virginia Parkways Authority ===

The West Virginia Parkways Authority was created in 1989 as a successor to the West Virginia Turnpike Commission. The agency is tasked with operating the West Virginia Turnpike, an 88-mile (142 km) tolled stretch of Interstate 77 from Charleston to Princeton. It was involved in the planned operation of a toll U.S. Route 35 in Mason and Putnam counties and the Mon-Fayette Expressway, however WV 43 was opened as a freeway and a possible toll US 35 completion was rejected by the Legislature in 2012.

The Parkways Authority used to be named the Parkways, Economic Development, and Tourism Authority. It participated in economic development programs, an activity that was curtailed under former governor Joe Manchin. It continues to operate Tamarack, Best of West Virginia, an arts and crafts center near Beckley, pending its transfer to the West Virginia Department of Commerce.

=== Division of Multimodal Transportation Facilities ===
The Division of Multimodal Transportation Facilities was created in 2022 and is tasked with operating the State Rail Authority, Division of Public Transit, Public Port Authority, and Aeronautics Commission.

==== State Rail Authority ====
The State Rail Authority was formed to assume ownership of rail lines that were planned for abandonment by their original operators. It directly operates the South Branch Valley Railroad, a former 52-mile (84 km) Baltimore & Ohio Railroad line between Green Spring and Petersburg.

The authority also owns the West Virginia Central Railroad, consisting of 132 miles (212 km) near Elkins. The West Virginia Central is operated by a private company, the Durbin and Greenbrier Valley Railroad.

Other State Rail Authority duties include promoting tourist and short-line railroads, operating three MARC train stations in the Eastern Panhandle, and helping to preserve or railbank lines targeted for abandonment.

==== Division of Public Transit ====
The Division of Public Transit helps assist public transit agencies in the state.

==== Public Port Authority ====
The Public Port Authority helps to develop and market ports and intermodal facilities in the state.

==== Aeronautics Commission ====
The Aeronautics Commission helps to develop and fund air infrastructure projects in West Virginia.
