= Campbells Creek (West Virginia) =

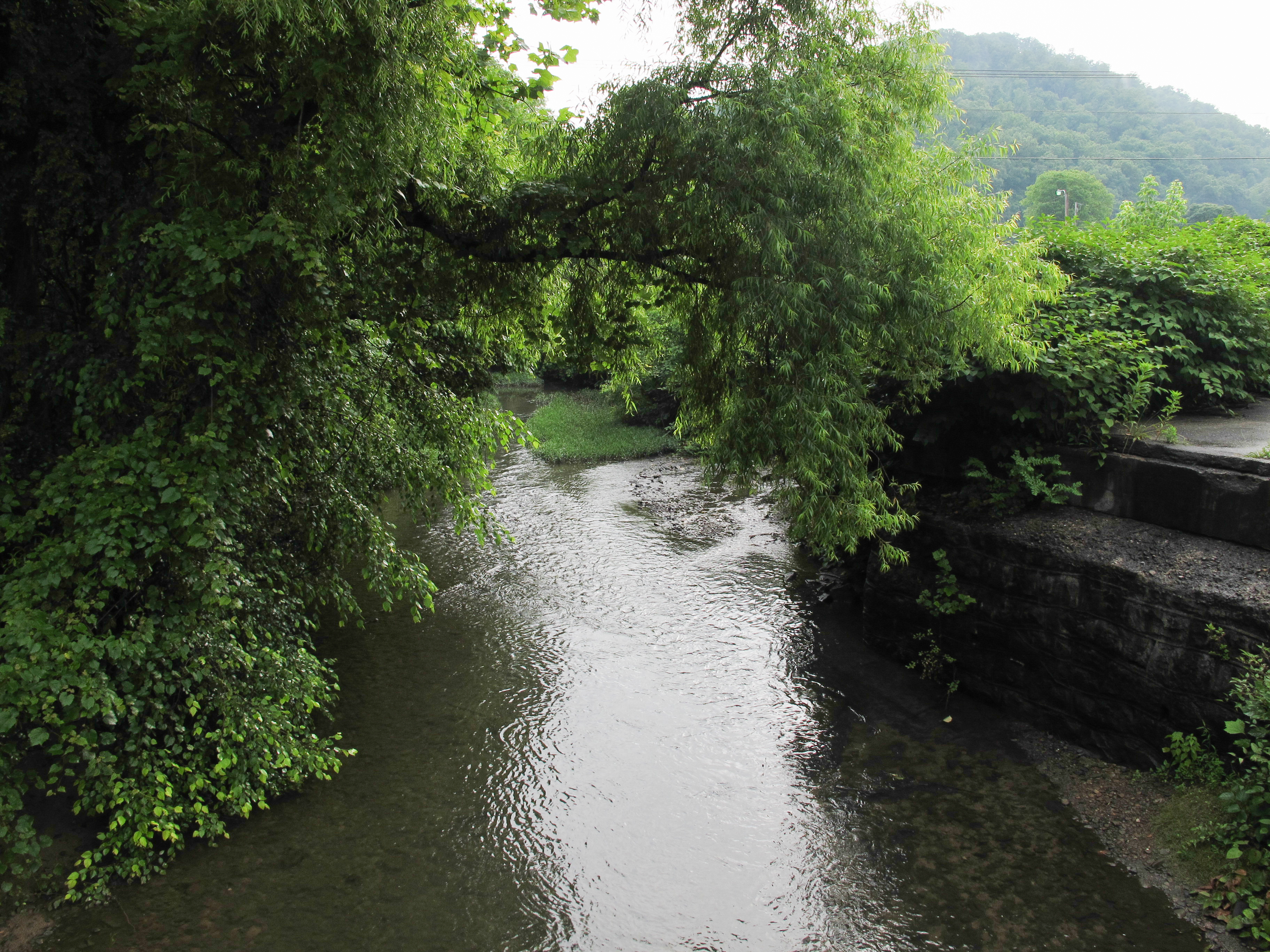
- Campbells Creek near Coal Fork

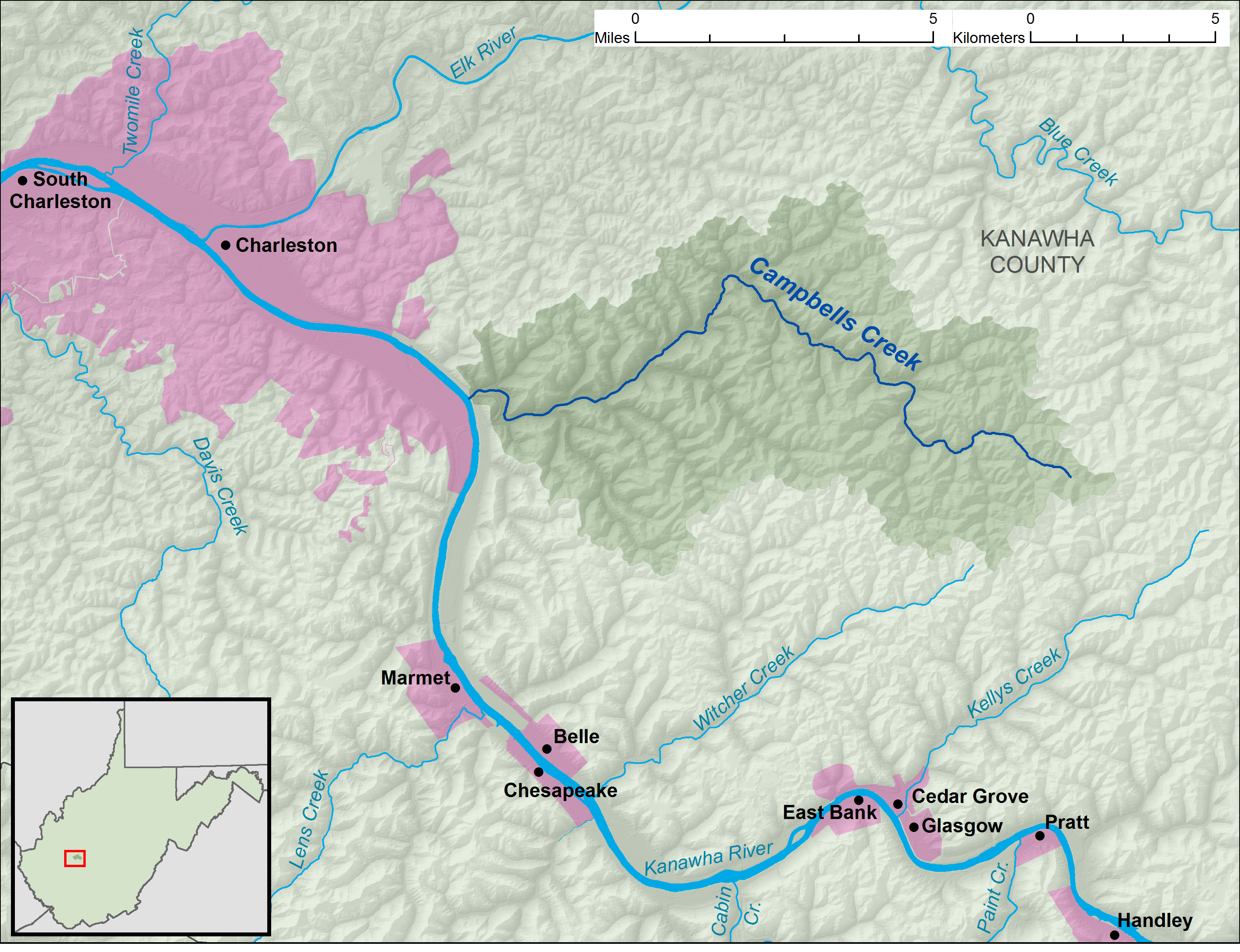
- A map of Campbells Creek and its watershed

Location
- Country: United States
- State: West Virginia
- County: Kanawha

Physical characteristics
- Source
  - location: near Putney
  - coordinates: 38.2964914°N 81.3645597°W
  - elevation: 1,430 ft (440 m)
- Mouth: Kanawha River
  - location: near Port Amherst
  - coordinates: 38.3167660°N 81.5628989°W
  - elevation: 568 ft (173 m)
- Length: 18.5 mi (29.8 km)
- Basin size: 39.3 sq mi (102 km^{2})

Basin features
- Hydrologic Unit Code: 050500060404 (USGS)

Campbells Creek is a tributary of the Kanawha River, 18.5 miles (29.8 km) long, in West Virginia in the United States. Via the Kanawha and Ohio rivers, it is part of the watershed of the Mississippi River, draining an area of 39.3 square miles (102 km^{2}) on the unglaciated portion of the Allegheny Plateau, in the Charleston metropolitan area.

Campbells Creek flows for its entire length in Kanawha County. It rises approximately 0.4 miles (0.64 km) east of the unincorporated community of Putney and flows northwestward through Putney and the unincorporated communities of Annfred, Blount, Cinco, and Fivemile; then southwestward through the unincorporated communities of Tad and Coal Fork. It flows into the Kanawha River approximately 0.5 miles (0.80 km) north-northwest of Port Amherst. The creek is paralleled by county roads for most of its course.

The Geographic Names Information System lists "Campbell Creek," "Campbell's Creek," and "Nip-pi-pin-mah" as historical variant names for the creek.

== See also ==
- List of rivers of West Virginia
