= Kelly Hill =

Kelly Hill may refer to:

- Kelly Hill, West Virginia, an unincorporated community in Kanawha County
- Kelly Hill Conservation Park, a protected area on Kangaroo Island in South Australia
- Kelli Hill (born 1960), an American gymnastics coach

== See also ==
- Kelly Hills, an Australian mountain range
- Kelly Park (disambiguation)
