= Giles, West Virginia =

Unincorporated community in West Virginia, United States

- Unincorporated community
- Location within West Virginia and the United States Giles (the United States)
- Coordinates: 38°8′3″N 81°26′50″W
- Country: United States
- State: West Virginia
- County: Kanawha
- Elevation: 722 ft (220 m)
- Time zone: UTC-5 (Eastern (EST))
  - Summer (DST): UTC-4 (EDT)
- GNIS ID: 1554552

Giles is an unincorporated community in Kanawha County, West Virginia, United States, along Cabin Creek. It lies between the unincorporated communities locally known as Ohley and Dawes.
