= Kellys Creek (West Virginia) =

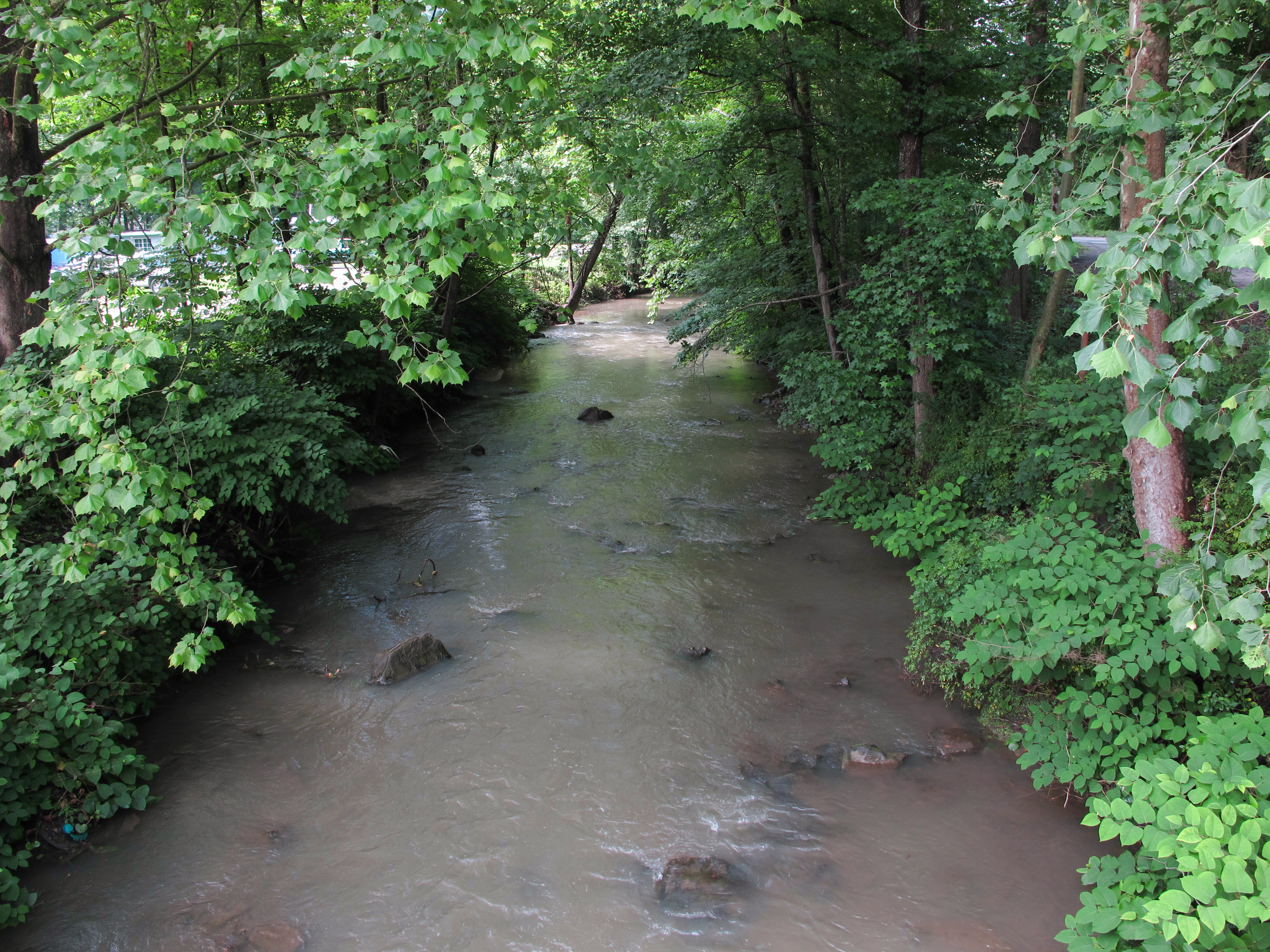
- Kellys Creek near Cedar Grove

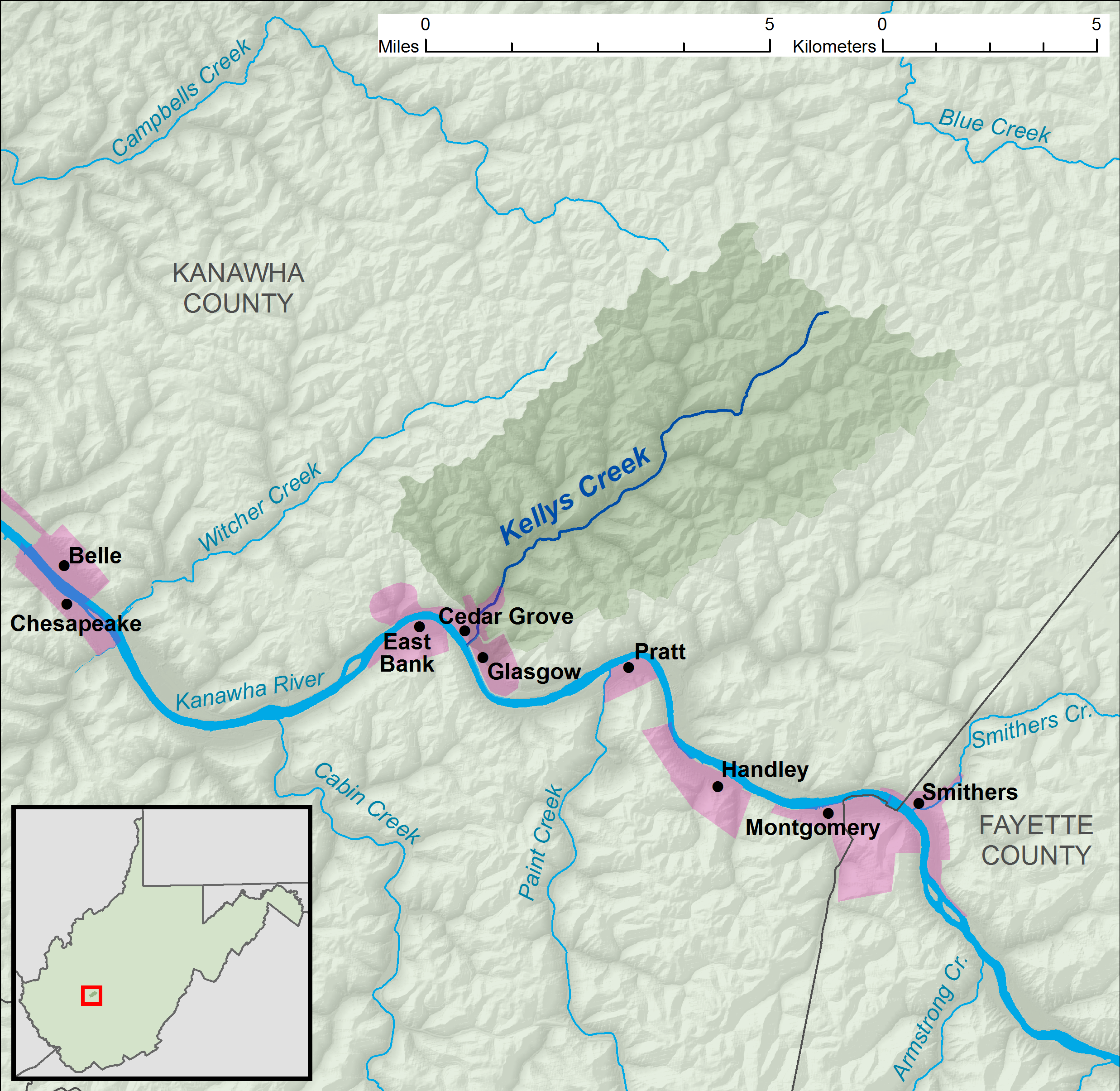
- A map of Kellys Creek and its watershed

Location
- Country: United States
- State: West Virginia
- County: Kanawha

Physical characteristics
- Source
  - location: west of Hitop
  - coordinates: 38.2851032°N 81.3306696°W
  - elevation: 1,383 ft (422 m)
- Mouth: Kanawha River
  - location: boundary of Cedar Grove and Glasgow
  - coordinates: 38.2151036°N 81.4295597°W
  - elevation: 591 ft (180 m)
- Length: 6.5 mi (10.5 km)
- Basin size: 24.7 sq mi (64 km^{2})

Basin features
- Hydrologic Unit Code: 050500060305 (USGS)

Kellys Creek is a tributary of the Kanawha River, 6.5 miles (10.5 km) long, in West Virginia in the United States. Via the Kanawha and Ohio rivers, it is part of the watershed of the Mississippi River, draining an area of 24.7 square miles (64 km^{2}) in a coal mining region on the unglaciated portion of the Allegheny Plateau.

Kellys Creek flows for its entire length in eastern Kanawha County. It rises approximately 2.1 miles (3.4 km) west of Hitop and flows southwestward through the unincorporated communities of Mammoth and Ward to the towns of Cedar Grove and Glasgow. It flows into the Kanawha River on the common boundary between the two towns. The creek is paralleled by county roads for most of its course.

The creek was named after Walter Kelly, an early settler. According to the Geographic Names Information System, Kellys Creek has also been known historically by the variant spellings “Kelley Creek,” “Kelley's Creek,” “Kelly Creek,” and “Kelly's Creek.”

== See also ==
- List of rivers of West Virginia
