= Cabin Creek (West Virginia) =

Creek in Kanawha and Fayette counties in West Virginia, United States

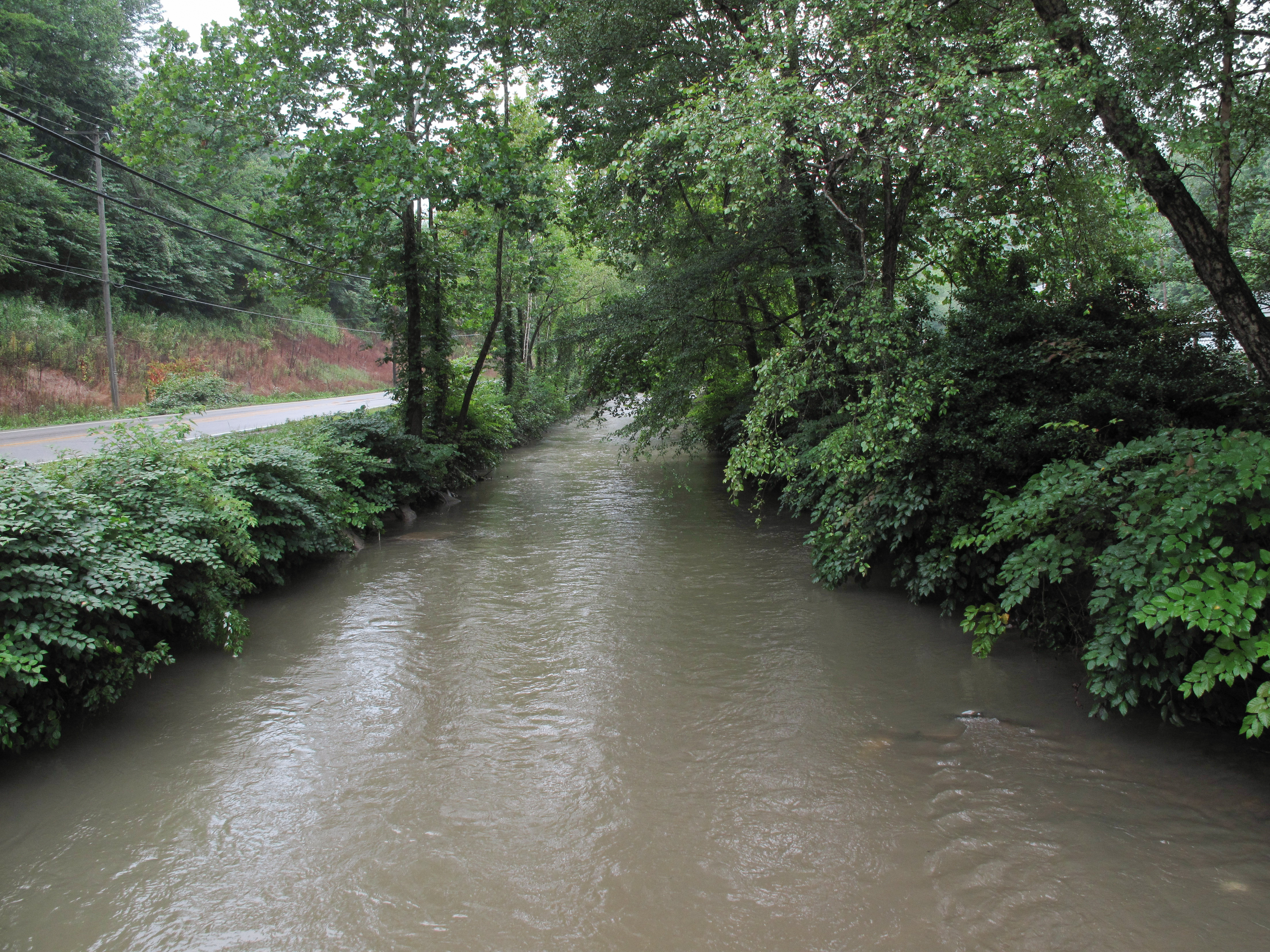
- Cabin Creek near Ronda

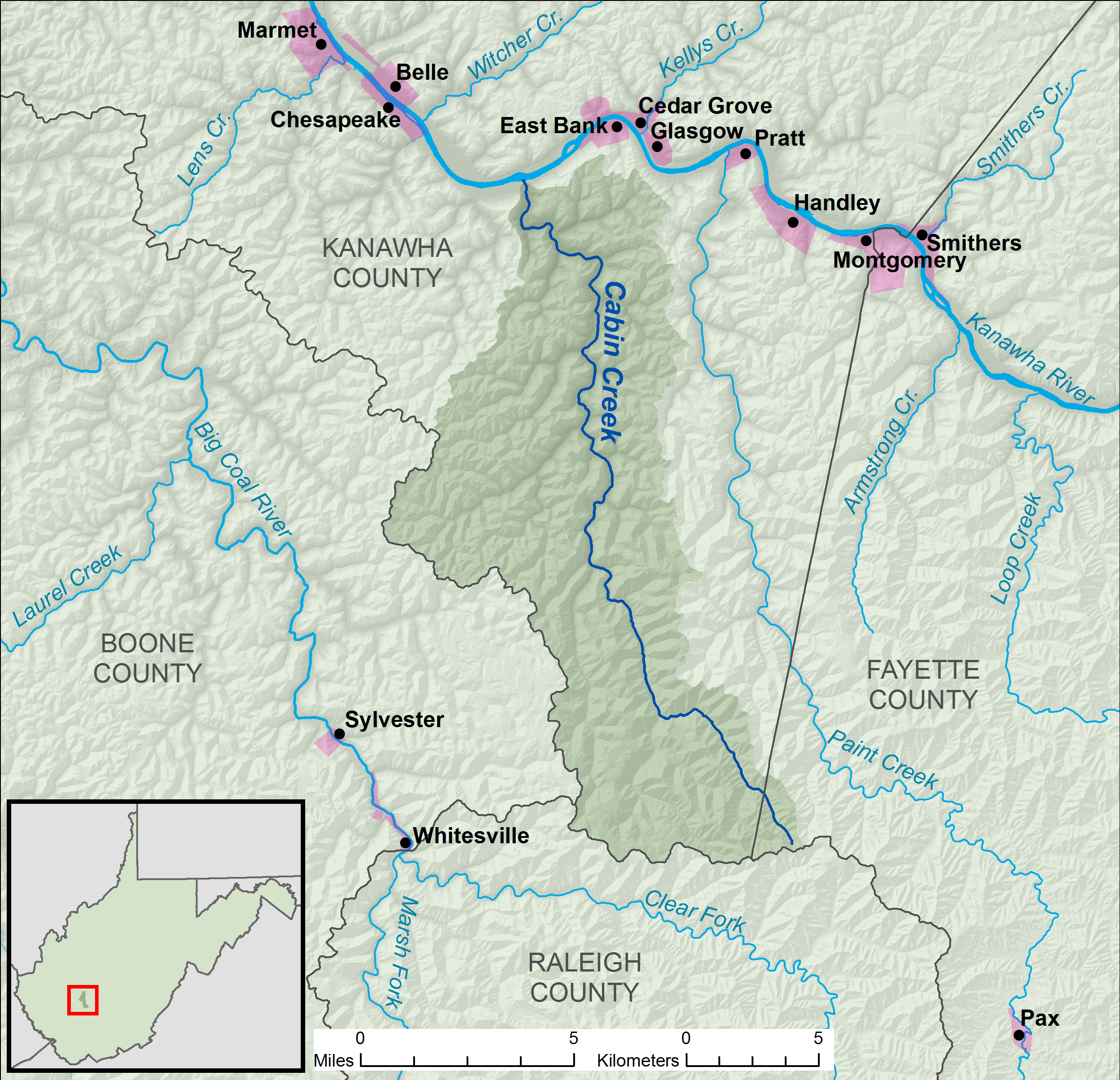
- A map of Cabin Creek and its watershed

Location
- Country: United States
- State: West Virginia
- Counties: Fayette, Kanawha

Physical characteristics
- Source
  - location: south-southwest of Coalfield
  - coordinates: 37.9737203°N 81.3631638°W
  - elevation: 2,311 ft (704 m)
- Mouth: Kanawha River
  - location: Cabin Creek
  - coordinates: 38.1989922°N 81.4801162°W
  - elevation: 591 ft (180 m)
- Length: 22.7 mi (36.5 km)
- Basin size: 73 sq mi (190 km^{2})

Basin features
- Hydrologic Unit Code: 0505000602 (USGS)

Cabin Creek is a tributary of the Kanawha River, 22.7 miles (36.5 km) long, in West Virginia in the United States. Via the Kanawha and Ohio rivers, it is part of the watershed of the Mississippi River, draining an area of 72.6 square miles (188 km^{2}) in a coal mining region on the unglaciated portion of the Allegheny Plateau.

== Description ==
Cabin Creek begins in western Fayette County, approximately 2.2 miles (3.5 km) south-southwest of Coalfield. It flows in southern Kanawha County for most of its course, north-northwestward through the unincorporated communities of Republic, Carbon, Decota, Laing, Quarrier, Holly, Leewood, Eskdale, Ohley, Coal, Giles, Dawes, Miami, Sharon, Ronda, and Dry Branch, to the community of Cabin Creek, where it flows into the Kanawha River. The creek is paralleled by county roads for most of its course, and additionally by the West Virginia Turnpike from Giles to its mouth.

Cabin Creek was named for a nearby pioneer's cabin which was raided by Native Americans in the 1740s.

== Cabin Creek Strike ==
The Paint Creek–Cabin Creek Strike, or the Paint Creek Mine War, was a confrontation between striking coal miners and coal operators in Kanawha County, West Virginia, centered on the area enclosed by two streams, Paint Creek and Cabin Creek.

The strike lasted from April 18, 1912, through July 1913. After the confrontation, Fred Stanton, a banker, estimated that the strike and ensuing violence cost $100 million ($3.258 billion in 2025). The confrontation directly caused perhaps fifty violent deaths, as well as many more deaths indirectly caused by starvation and malnutrition among the striking miners. In the number of casualties it counts among the worst conflicts in American labor union history.

The strike was a prelude to subsequent labor-related West Virginia conflicts in the following years, the Battle of Matewan and the Battle of Blair Mountain.

== See also ==
- List of rivers of West Virginia
