= Twomile Creek (Kanawha River tributary) =

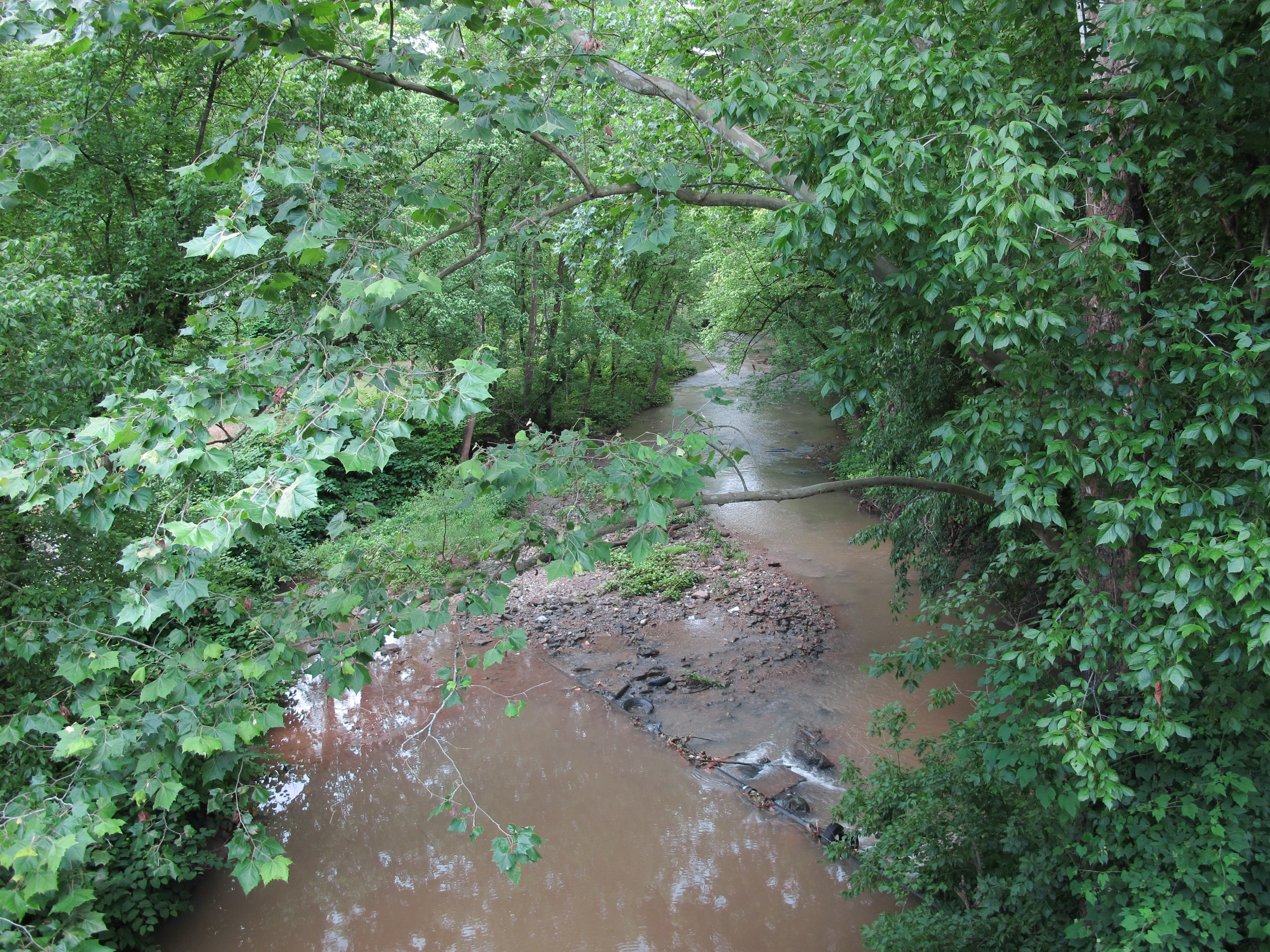
- Twomile Creek in Charleston

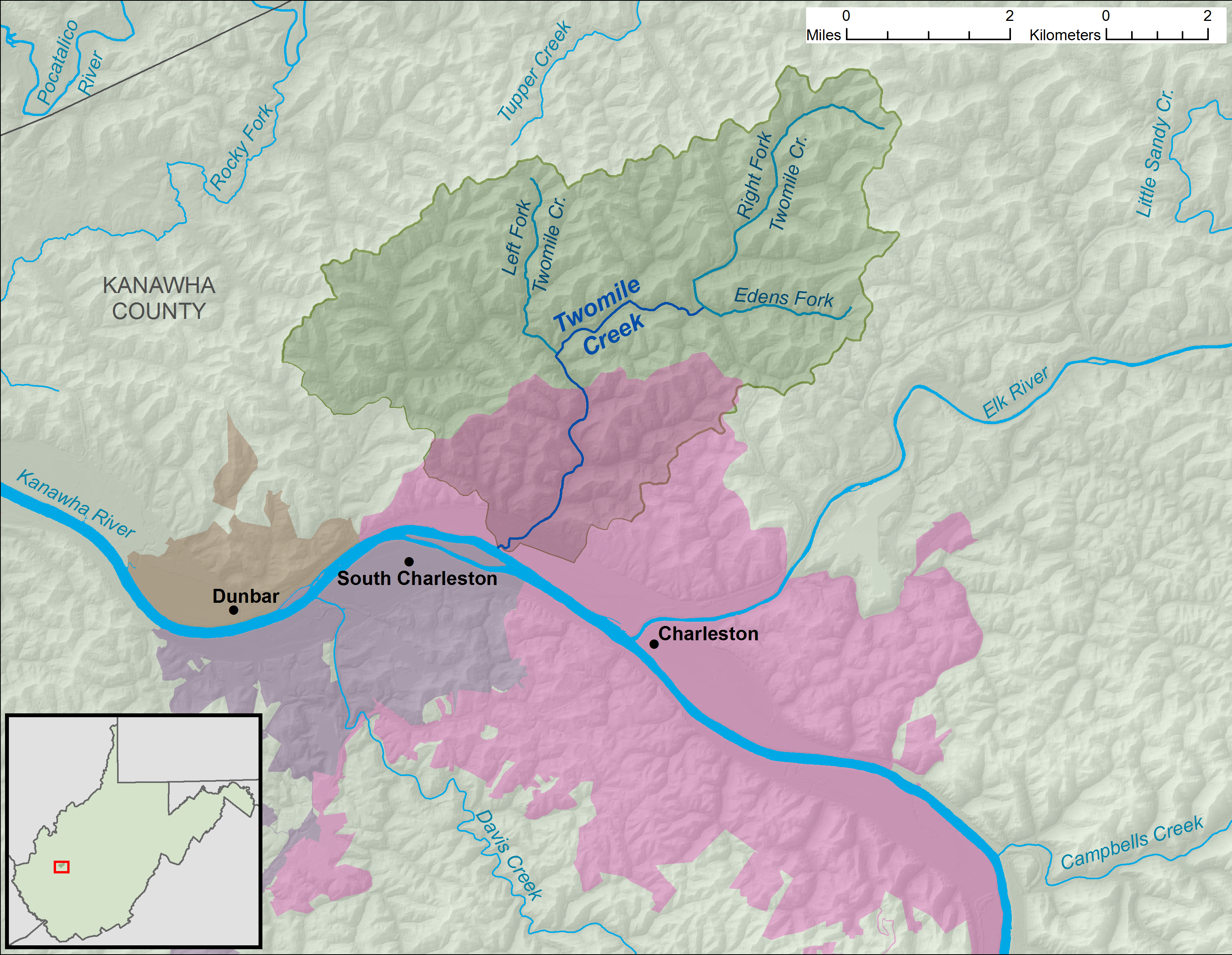
- A map of Twomile Creek and its watershed

Location
- Country: United States
- State: West Virginia
- County: Kanawha

Physical characteristics
- Source: Right Fork Twomile Creek
  - location: north-northwest of Elk Hills
  - coordinates: 38.4456513°N 81.5898468°W
  - length: 4.6 mi (7.4 km)
  - elevation: 973 ft (297 m)
- 2nd source: Edens Fork
  - location: northwest of Elk Hills
  - coordinates: 38.4159296°N 81.595124°W
  - length: 2.4 mi (3.9 km)
  - elevation: 862 ft (263 m)
- Source confluence
  - location: southwest of McDunn
  - coordinates: 38.4137069°N 81.6295692°W
  - elevation: 678 ft (207 m)
- Mouth: Kanawha River
  - location: Charleston
  - coordinates: 38.3706516°N 81.6762361°W
  - elevation: 568 ft (173 m)
- Length: 4.7 mi (7.6 km)
- Basin size: 24.4 sq mi (63 km^{2})

Basin features
- Tributaries
  - right: Left Fork Twomile Creek
- Hydrologic Unit Code: 050500080301 (USGS)

Twomile Creek is a tributary of the Kanawha River, 4.7 miles (7.6 km) long, in West Virginia in the United States. Via the Kanawha and Ohio rivers, it is part of the watershed of the Mississippi River, draining an area of 24.4 square miles (63 km^{2}) on the unglaciated portion of the Allegheny Plateau, in the city of Charleston and its vicinity.

Twomile Creek is formed approximately 1.8 miles (2.9 km) east-northeast of the unincorporated community of Guthrie by the confluence of the Right Fork Twomile Creek, 4.6 miles (7.4 km) long, which rises approximately 3.3 miles (5.3 km) north-northwest of the unincorporated community of Elk Hills, and flows southwestward; and Edens Fork, 2.4 miles (3.9 km) long, which rises approximately 1.7 miles (2.7 km) northwest of Elk Hills and flows westward. From the confluence of these forks, Twomile Creek flows westward and southward, through Guthrie, to its mouth at the Kanawha River in the city of Charleston.

The creek is paralleled by county roads for much of its length. At Guthrie, it collects the Left Fork Twomile Creek, 4 miles (6.4 km) long, which rises approximately 1.9 miles (3.1 km) north-northwest of Guthrie and flows generally southward.

== See also ==
- List of rivers of West Virginia
