= Tad =

Tad or TAD may refer to:

== Places ==
- Tad, West Virginia, an unincorporated community
- Tad City, Texas, a coastal unincorporated community located on Olsovsky Road (Suburb of Ganado)
- Tad, Isfahan, a village in Isfahan Province, Iran
- Tad, Markazi, a village in Markazi Province, Iran

== People and fictional characters ==
- Tad (given name)

== Sports ==
- Tadamon Sour SC, a Lebanese association football club
- Tuvalu A-Division, top flight association football league in Tuvalu
  - Tuvalu A-Division (women)

== TAD ==
- TAD Disability Services, an Australian charity
- Technical Audio Devices, a brand of speakers by Pioneer Corporation
- Telephone answering device, alternate term for an Answering machine
- Technology aware design, a project of IMEC, a Belgian electronics company
- Tax-allocation district, alternate term for a tax increment financing area
- The Anglican Digest, a religious magazine in the United States
- Temporary additional duty, a form of Temporary duty assignment in the US Navy and US Marines
- Thoracic aortic dissection, breakdown of the aorta in the chest
- Topologically associating domain, in genetics a DNA region with parts that interact with each other
- Textbook of Aramaic Documents from Ancient Egypt

== Other uses ==
- Tad (band), a Seattle band
- TAD Corporation, a Japanese manufacturer of video arcade games
- ISO 639-3 code for the Tause language, spoken by 350 people in Papua
- Initials of Terry A. Davis (1969 - 2018), American computer programmer
- A tad, colloquial or ironic for 'a small amount'

== See also ==
- TADS (Text Adventure Development System)
