= William H. Davis (educator) =

American educator (1848–1938)

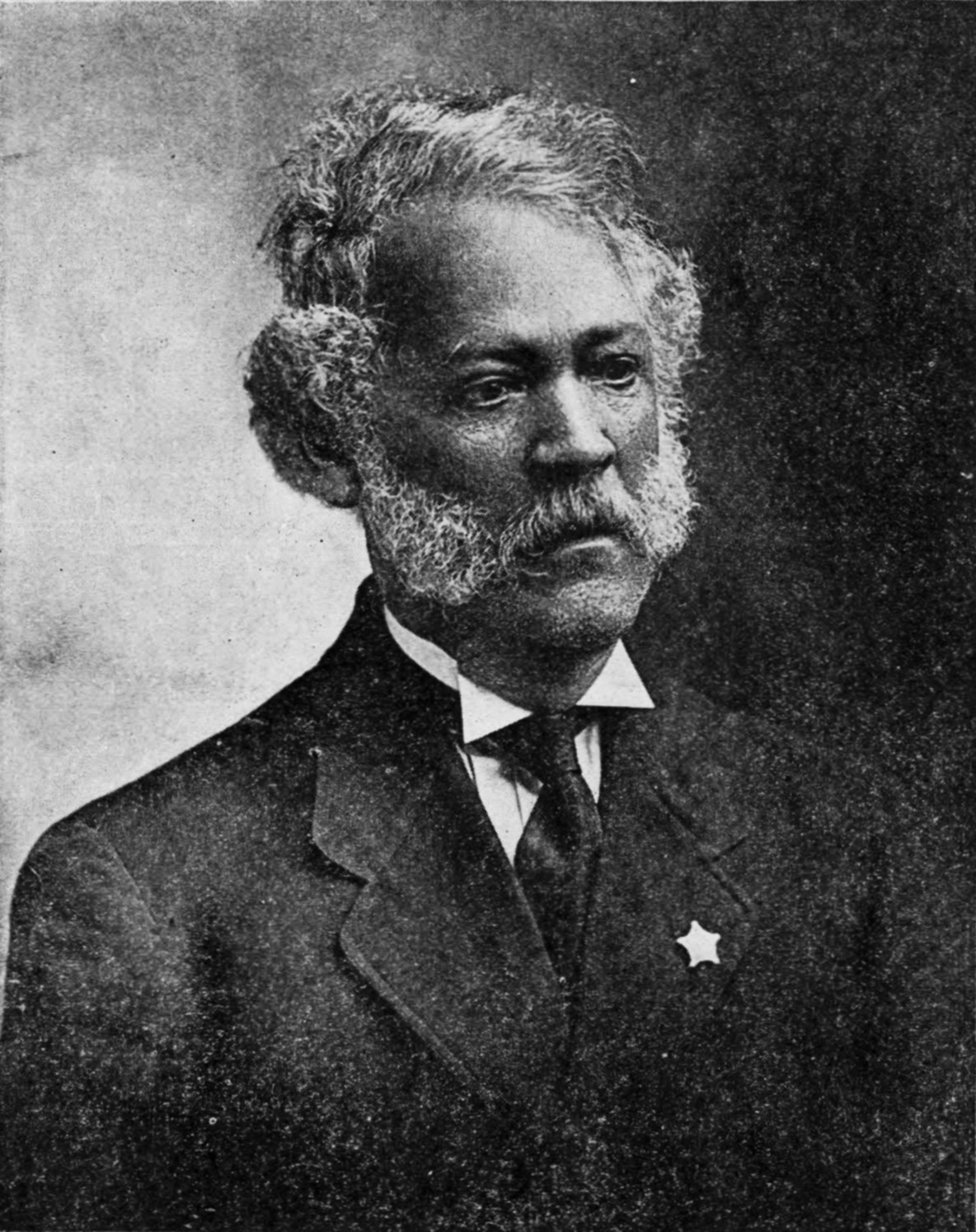
- Portrait of Davis, published in The Institute Monthly, 1911
- Born: November 27, 1848; Columbus, Ohio, U.S.
- Died: March 24, 1938 (aged 89); Charleston, West Virginia, U.S.
- Burial place: Spring Hill Cemetery, Charleston
- Occupations: Educator and school administrator
- Spouse: Hallie Ann Lewis (m. 1869)
- Children: 8
- Military career
- Branch: United States Army (Union Army)
- Service years: 1863–1865
- Rank: Private
- Units: 7th Independent Company (Union Light Guard), Ohio Volunteer Cavalry

Academic work
- Institutions: African-American schools in Tinkersville and Charleston, West Virginia
- Notable students: Booker T. Washington

William H. Davis (November 27, 1848 – March 24, 1938) was an American educator and school administrator in the U.S. state of West Virginia. Davis was the first formal teacher of Booker T. Washington, and he was the first and only African-American candidate for governor of West Virginia, running for the office in 1888.

Davis was born in Columbus, Ohio, in 1848. He was educated in public schools in Columbus and Chillicothe. After graduation, he enlisted in the 7th Independent Company of the Ohio Volunteer Cavalry, known as the Union Light Guard, in the Union Army. Davis's unit was a cavalry regiment that guarded President Abraham Lincoln and was stationed in Washington, D.C., during the American Civil War. He was honorably discharged in 1865 following surgery due to an infection of the mastoid part of his temporal bone. Following the war, he operated a steamboat between Gallipolis, Charleston, and Brownstown.

In September 1865, he began boarding with Reverend Lewis Rice in the Tinkersville section of Malden. Rice hired Davis as a schoolteacher at the privately run Tinkersville school, with classes being held in Rice's home at first. Davis was the first teacher of Booker T. Washington at the Tinkersville school. In 1871, Davis was hired to serve as principal of Charleston's African-American schools. Davis served as principal for a total of 24 years and continued to teach. He retired from teaching in 1913, having taught for 47 years.

In 1888, the Colored Independent Party nominated Davis as the party's gubernatorial candidate in the 1888 elections. The party organized in opposition to the Republican Party because of its refusal to recognize West Virginia's African-American voters and advocated for an end to school segregation. Davis became the first African American nominated as a candidate for West Virginia governor, and as of 2022, is the only African-American gubernatorial candidate in the state's history. When Booker T. Washington was honored at a 1937 Tuskegee University anniversary celebration, Davis was invited and attended as a guest of honor.

== Early life and education ==
William H. Davis was born in Columbus, Ohio, on November 27, 1848. Davis's father and his maternal grandfather were active supporters of the Underground Railroad, providing refuge and food for slaves escaping from the Southern United States. Davis was raised in Columbus and was educated in the public school system until the age of 13, when he relocated to Chillicothe from 1861 to 1863 to study English education at public schools. He returned to Columbus in fall 1863.

== Military service ==
During the American Civil War, Davis enlisted in the 7th Independent Company of the Ohio Volunteer Cavalry – known as the Union Light Guard – in the Union Army, on December 18, 1863, at Columbus. Davis's unit was a cavalry regiment, variously known as the "President's Escort" and "Lincoln's Body Guard", that guarded President Abraham Lincoln and was stationed at Washington, D.C., during the war. The Light Guard encamped by the White House and guarded the War Department building and other government buildings in Washington.

Davis served at the rank of private and worked as an assistant cook with a salary of $7 per month (equivalent to $183 in 2025). Davis served in the Union Army for 18 months, until he was hospitalized with an infection of the mastoid part of his temporal bone following severe head pains. While in the hospital, the physicians incised and drained the infected area, and Davis was afterward honorably discharged from his duty at Camp Todd Barracks in Washington, D.C., on June 24, 1865, a few months after the war's conclusion. Davis never fully recovered from his infection, suffering pain, enduring repeated incising, and experiencing deafness in one ear for the remainder of his life.

Following his military service, Davis returned to Columbus on June 27, 1865, to work with his father. He then relocated to Cincinnati, where he was hired to operate a steamboat, known variously as Victor or Victoria, between Gallipolis, Charleston, and Brownstown (present-day Marmet). Davis operated this boat for about a month, and in September 1865, he began boarding with Reverend Lewis Rice in the Tinkersville section of Malden (then known as Kanawha Salines), near Charleston. (Note: The northern area of Malden, along the Kanawha River, was known as Tinkersville at the time of Davis's arrival, and it is presently known as Port Amherst. Port Amherst is centered at the present-day intersection of U.S. Route 60, Tinkersville Drive, and Port Amherst Drive.)

== Career in education ==
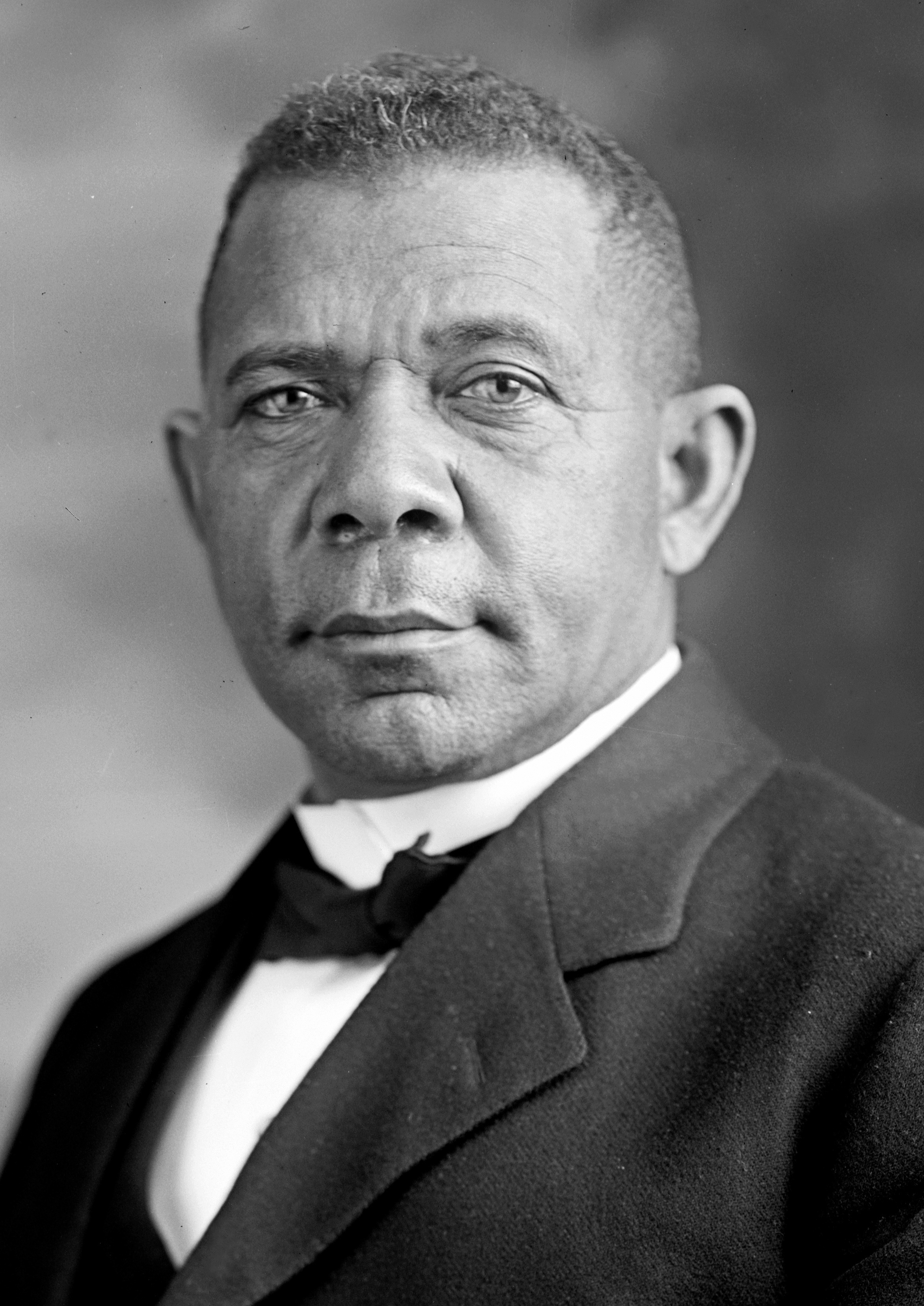
Booker T. Washington, photographed in 1905

At the time of Davis's arrival in September 1865, Malden had a large African-American population, consisting of former slaves who had previously been brought to Kanawha County to work in the local salt industry, or who had come to work in the industry after being freed following the war. While in Malden, it became known among the town's residents that Davis could read and write. Reverend Rice offered Davis a job teaching former slaves. Davis resigned from his position on the boat, and at the age of 18, he became a schoolteacher at Rice's privately operated Tinkersville school. The Tinkersville school was one of the first African-American schools in Kanawha County, and the first school in the Kanawha River valley to be conducted by an African-American instructor. It was funded by the poor residents of Malden, and was at first conducted in Rice's log home. The school transitioned from Rice's bedroom to a local church, and then a purpose-built classroom.

Davis arrived at Malden about one month after the arrival of Booker T. Washington and his family from Hale's Ford, Virginia, and while Davis was teaching at the Tinkersville school, Washington was one of his students. Davis was Washington's first teacher. He traveled to Washington's home to tutor and teach him outside of school hours, and took a special interest in Washington. Davis later described Washington as an apt student who readily learned, no matter the course material, and said that he was popular among his fellow students. In addition, Washington's wife, Fannie Smith Washington, attended the Tinkersville school.

Davis provided the school's first monthly report to the Freedmen's Bureau in November 1867, in which he described the Tinkersville school as a primary school and noted that it was supported in part by the local township school board and in part by the African-American residents. Davis noted that he was the only teacher, and characterizing the support of the township, he stated: "General apathy prevails where there is not decided prejudice and opposition." Davis continued to make progress with his students, and by January 1868, all but three of his students were "advanced readers". Following his marriage in 1869, Davis relocated to Charleston, while continuing to teach at the Tinkersville school, walking six miles (nine point seven kilometres) to and from there each school day.

Davis's abilities as an educator became widely known throughout the Kanawha River valley, and in 1871, he was hired to serve as principal of Charleston's African-American schools. When Davis commenced his tenure there, the schools were located in a two-room building on Quarrier Street and had an enrollment of around 100 students. Soon after, the building expanded to four rooms. In 1872, the Kanawha County Schools superintendent lauded Davis as being "well qualified in every way" and awarded him with a first grade teaching certificate. He also received the support of white benefactors, the most prominent of whom was Edward Moore, who operated a school for African Americans in Pennsylvania.

Davis was in charge of Charleston's African-American schools for 31 years, and he served as principal of the graded school for a total of 24 years, bringing his tenure as a teacher in the city's schools to a total of 47 years. While serving as principal, Davis was demoted to a subordinate teaching position before returning as principal. When Davis departed as principal, the school building had grown to five rooms, and the school had instituted a grade system, standardized instruction, and had begun employing and updated the teaching methodology. He retired from the Charleston schools in 1913. According to the Charleston Daily Mail, almost every African-American person in Charleston was either a student or under the direct supervision of Davis. In addition to his career in instruction and administration, Davis also served on the Kanawha County Board of Examiners.

Davis and his corps of teachers were among the first in West Virginia to advocate for a state institute of higher learning for African Americans in Southern West Virginia, which eventually resulted in the establishment of the West Virginia Colored Institute (present-day West Virginia State University) at Institute.

== Gubernatorial campaign ==
In September 1888, 49 African-American delegates formed the Colored Independent Party at a convention in Charleston, which then selected its state executive committee and nominated its state ticket for the 1888 elections. The party nominated Davis as their candidate for West Virginia governor, leading the party's state ticket. The convention opposed the Republican Party because it "refused to give the colored man the recognition to which he is entitled". In addition, the party denounced school segregation, and also opposed corporations, monopolies, and trusts. Davis's campaign in the 1888 West Virginia gubernatorial election made it the first major election in the state where African-American voters demonstrated their electoral force. Davis became the first African American nominated as a candidate for governor, and the only African-American candidate for governor to date.

== Personal life ==
In 1869, Davis married Hallie Ann Lewis in Tinkersville. At the time of his death in 1938, Davis had four living daughters—Mamie, Josephine, Inez, and Fannie—and 17 grandchildren, 12 great-grandchildren, and 6 great-great-grandchildren.

Davis joined the African Zion Baptist Church in Malden in 1866, and became a member of the First Baptist Church in Charleston in 1872. For many years, Davis served as the financial and recording secretary for the First Baptist Church. Davis was also a member of the Free and Accepted Masons, the Blundon post of the Grand Army of the Republic (GAR), and the Business and Professional Men's Club.

== Later life and death ==
In June 1911, Davis attended the West Virginia Colored Institute graduation, where he presented the James A. Booker prize and $15 in gold to student Jesse Fields for having the highest grades in the study of agriculture.

Following the death of Booker T. Washington, Davis wrote a poem in 1916 entitled "Battle Hymn of the Negro" dedicated to Washington's memory. The poem was written to the tune of Julia Ward Howe's "Battle Hymn of the Republic". When Washington was posthumously honored at a 1937 Tuskegee University anniversary celebration, Davis was invited and attended as a guest of honor. In his later life, Washington recognized Davis's impact on him, and he stated that Davis's contributions to education and his desire to teach helped shape Washington into the person he became.

In November 1929, Davis was commander of Blundon Post No. 73 of the GAR, when he entered into a dispute with West Virginia state archivist Clifford R. Myers. According to Davis, his post had been in possession of a battered U.S. flag with an inscription of the GAR's Department of West Virginia. Possession of the flag passed from a prior Blundon GAR post commander to a local Veterans of Foreign Wars post, which turned the flag over to the state archivist. Davis argued that the state should return the flag to the Blundon GAR post; however, state archivist Myers stated that he would refuse the flag's return. In June 1931, Davis participated in a GAR encampment in Huntington. In November 1937, Davis participated in Charleston's Armistice Day celebration and marched with American Civil War veterans.

Davis died of bronchial pneumonia at his home of 69 years at 600½ Court Street in Charleston on March 24, 1938. Davis's funeral service was held at Charleston's First Baptist Church on March 27, 1938, and he was interred at Spring Hill Cemetery in Charleston. From 1935 until the time of his death, Davis was one of two remaining members of the GAR in the Charleston area. Davis was buried wearing his Union Army uniform. According to the Charleston Daily Mail, he was proud of his uniform and the medals he had been awarded for his service to the Union Army.

== Legacy ==
A 1937 profile of Davis in the Charleston Daily Mail stated that Charleston's African-American citizens and "the memory of Booker Washington, will stand as a tribute to [Davis's] life work in the education and uplifting of the people of his race". In 2011, Davis's descendant Ronald Woodson appealed to Charleston mayor Danny Jones, requesting that he consider recognizing Davis as a significant local historical figure.

Davis was recognized with a highway historical marker as part of the West Virginia Highway Historical Marker Program, which is managed by West Virginia Archives and History. The inscription of this marker reads: "Born in Ohio in 1848, Davis served during the Civil War in the Union Light Guard of Ohio that was tasked with protecting President Lincoln. After the war, he moved to present-day Malden and later Charleston, where he served as an educator. His most noted student was Booker T. Washington. He became the first African-American candidate to run for governor in 1888. Died in 1938." The marker is located along Kanawha Boulevard West, at the Mary C. Snow West Side Elementary School in Charleston.
