= Shrewsbury, West Virginia =

- Census-designated place (CDP)
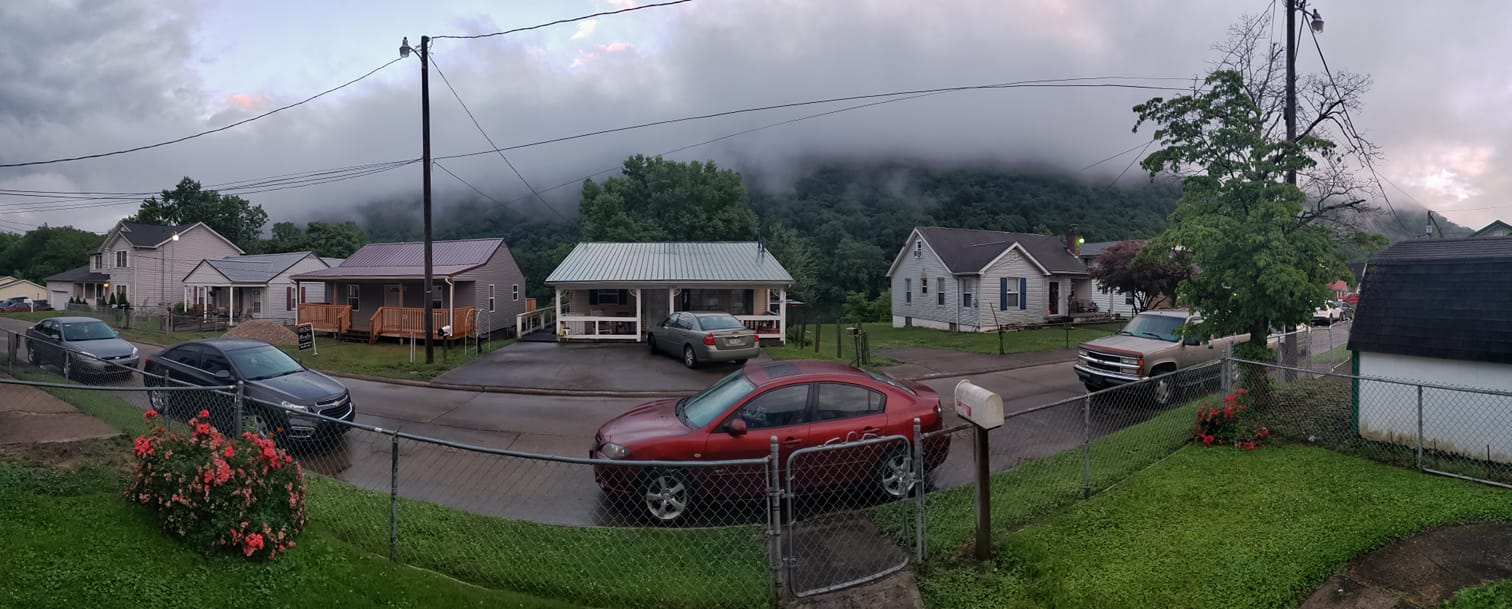
- Residential homes along the banks of the Kanawha River in Shrewsbury.

- Location in Kanawha County and state of West Virginia.
- Coordinates: 38°12′22″N 81°28′17″W
- Country: United States
- State: West Virginia
- County: Kanawha

Area
  - Total: 0.435 sq mi (1.13 km^{2})
  - Land: 0.350 sq mi (0.91 km^{2})
  - Water: 0.085 sq mi (0.22 km^{2})
- Elevation: 623 ft (190 m)

Population (2020)
  - Total: 517
  - Density: 1,480/sq mi (570/km^{2})
- Time zone: UTC-5 (Eastern (EST))
  - Summer (DST): UTC-4 (EDT)
- Postal code: 25015
- Area codes: 304 & 681
- GNIS feature ID: 1546745

Shrewsbury is a census-designated place (CDP) and unincorporated community in Kanawha County, West Virginia, United States. Shrewsbury is located on the north bank of the Kanawha River along U.S. Route 60. As of the 2020 census, its population was 517 (down from 652 at the 2010 census).

Like the nearby community of Dickinson, Shrewsbury was given its name due to the early history of the Dickinson and Shrewsbury families within the area.

Shrewsbury is home to a Liberty gas station and convenience store, the Mason-Dixon Bar, and three churches; The Shrewsbury Church of God, Shrewsbury Community Church and the Shrewsbury Baptist Church.
