= Quarrier, West Virginia =

- Unincorporated community
- Location within West Virginia and the United States Quarrier (the United States)
- Coordinates: 38°3′1″N 81°25′56″W
- Country: United States
- State: West Virginia
- County: Kanawha
- Elevation: 971 ft (296 m)
- Time zone: UTC-5 (Eastern (EST))
  - Summer (DST): UTC-4 (EDT)
- GNIS ID: 1545331

Quarrier is an unincorporated community and coal town in Kanawha County, West Virginia, United States, situated along Cabin Creek.

The community was named after the local Quarrier family.
