= Meadowbrook, West Virginia =

Meadowbrook, West Virginia may refer to:

- Meadowbrook, Harrison County, West Virginia, an unincorporated community in Harrison County
- Meadowbrook, Kanawha County, West Virginia, an unincorporated community in Kanawha County
