= Fort Hill =

Fort Hill may refer to:

== Places ==
=== United States ===
- Fort Hill, site of Fort Moore, a former landmark overlooking the Old West town of Los Angeles, California
- Fort Hill (Frankfort, Kentucky), a park and historic site
- Fort Hill, Boston, Massachusetts, a neighborhood and historic district
- Fort Hill Estate, an historic estate in Lloyd Harbor, New York
- Fort Hill State Memorial, a Native American earthwork located in Highland County, Ohio
- Nelson Avenue–Fort Hill Historic District, a residential neighborhood in northwestern Peekskill, New York
- Fort Hill, Oregon, an unincorporated community in Polk and Yamhill counties
- Fort Hill, Pennsylvania, an unincorporated community in Somerset County
- Fort Hill (Clemson, South Carolina), John C. Calhoun's house
- Fort Hill, West Virginia, a community
- Fort Hill (Burlington, West Virginia), a historic plantation

=== Other places ===
- Chitipa, Malawi, also known as Fort Hill

== Schools ==
- Fort Hill College, Lisburn, Northern Ireland
- Fort Hill Community School, Winklebury, Basingstoke, Hampshire, UK
- Fort Hill High School, Cumberland, Maryland

== See also ==
- Fort Hill Historic District (disambiguation)
- Fort Walker, formerly named Fort A.P. Hill
- Hillforts
