= Middle Fork, West Virginia (disambiguation) =

Middle Fork is the name of several places in the U.S. state of West Virginia.

- Middle Fork, a community in Barbour County
- Acup, a community formerly known as Middle Fork in Kanawha County
- Middle Fork River, a tributary of the Tygart Valley River
