= 31st Illinois Infantry Regiment =

31st Regiment Illinois Volunteer Infantry
- Illinois state flag
- Active: September 18, 1861, to July 24, 1865
- Country: United States
- Allegiance: Union
- Branch: Infantry,
- Nickname: Dirty First
- Engagements: Battle of Belmont; Battle of Fort Donelson; Battle of Champion Hill; Battle of Big Black River; Siege of Vicksburg; Battle of Kennesaw Mountain; Battle of Atlanta; Battle of Jonesboro; March to the Sea

The 31st Regiment Illinois Volunteer Infantry, nicknamed the "Dirty-First" was an infantry regiment that served in the Union Army during the American Civil War.

== Service ==
The 31st Illinois Infantry was organized at Jacksonville, Illinois , and mustered into Federal service at Cairo, Illinois, on September 18, 1861. Among the early officers was Major Andrew J. Kuykendall, later a U.S. Representative and Illinois State Senator.

The 31st Illinois saw its first combat engagement at the Battle of Belmont on November 7th, 1861, just two months after its organization. In February 1862, the regiment participated in the Battles of Fort Henry Before Moving to Fort Donelson. During fierce fighting in Fort Donelson on February 15th, the regiment suffered 260 casualties and was noted for successfully performing a rare and difficult maneuver by quickly repositioning their entire line formation to face a new direction. They managed to do it while being under fire, pushing through tangled, thick brushes and thorns, and navigating slippery, uneven ground covered in winter snow.

Following these Victories, the regiment moved to Pittsburg Landing and participated in the Siege of Corinth. The regiment spent the summer of 1862 conducting garrison and scouting duties in Tennessee.

=== Vicksburg Campaign ===
The Regiment was attached to Logan's Division, occupying a perilous position at Fort Hill.

In early 1863, the 31st Illinois joined Grant's Army for the Vicksburg Campaign. The regiment was attached to Logan's Division, and the regiment fought in a series of engagements. The first was Port Gibson, where the regiment charged the Confederate right wing under the observation of Governor Richard Yates. They later fought at Raymond and Jackson, participating in the dispersal of Confederate brigades and the capture of the Mississippi state capital. They later took part in the Battle of Champion Hill, where they were engaged in hand-to-hand combat, capturing a Confederate battery and taking hundreds of Confederate Prisoners.

During the Siege of Vicksburg, the regiment occupied a perilous position at Fort Hill. On June 25th, 1863, after the explosion of a union mine, the regiment fought in the crater, famously called the "Slaughter Pen", In close quarters combat using grenades and clubbed muskets, Lieutenant Colonel Reece was killed during the siege while planting colors on the enemy ramparts; the flag staff was shot into four pieces and the silk riddled with 153 bullets.

=== Veteran Service and the Atlanta Campaign ===
On January 5th, 1864, seventy-five percent of the regiment re-enlisted as Veterans. Following a furlough, they took part in the Atlanta Campaign. The regiment saw heavy action at Kenesaw Mountain and Atlanta. At Atlanta, the fighting was so intense that the regiment supposedly fought on both sides of the same earthworks simultaneously.

=== Carolinas Campaign ===
The 31st Illinois Joined in Sherman's March to the Sea, Arriving in Savannah in December 1864. In 1865, the regiment marched through the Carolinas, taking part in the capture of Orangeburg and participating in the Battle of Bentonville.

Following the surrender of Joseph E. Johnston's Army, the regiment marched to Washington, D.C., for the Grand Review of the Armies on May 24th, 1865.

The regiment was mustered out on July 19, 1865, and discharged at Springfield, Illinois, on July 31, 1865.

== Total strength and casualties ==
The regiment suffered 9 officers and 166 enlisted men who were killed in action or who died of their wounds and 1 officer and 293 enlisted men who died of disease, for a total of 471 fatalities.

== Commanders ==
- Colonel John A. Logan
- Colonel Lindorf Osborn
- Colonel Edwin S. McCook - Mustered out with the regiment.

== See also ==
- List of Illinois Civil War Units
- Illinois in the American Civil War
