= Kendalia =

Kendalia may refer to:

- Kendalia, Texas, a community in Kendall County, Texas
- Kendalia, West Virginia, a community in Kanawha County, West Virginia
