= Amandaville =

Amandaville may refer to:

- Amandaville, Kentucky, an unincorporated community in Cumberland County
- Amandaville, West Virginia, an unincorporated community in Kanawha County
