= Ronda, West Virginia =

- Unincorporated community
- Location within West Virginia and the United States Ronda (the United States)
- Coordinates: 38°10′4″N 81°26′50″W
- Country: United States
- State: West Virginia
- County: Kanawha
- Elevation: 646 ft (197 m)
- Time zone: UTC-5 (Eastern (EST))
  - Summer (DST): UTC-4 (EDT)
- GNIS ID: 1546057

Ronda is an unincorporated community and coal town in Kanawha County, West Virginia, United States, along Cabin Creek. Its post office is closed.
