= Ivydale, West Virginia =

Ivydale, West Virginia may refer to:

- Ivydale, Clay County, West Virginia, an unincorporated community in Clay County
- Ivydale, Kanawha County, West Virginia, an unincorporated community in Kanawha County
