= Riverbend =

Riverbend may refer to:

- A knee or a meander in a river

== Places ==
=== Australia ===
- Riverbend, Queensland, a suburb in Logan City

=== Canada ===
- Riverbend, Calgary, a neighborhood in Calgary, Alberta
- Riverbend, Edmonton
- Riverbend, a village in Quebec, now part of the town of Alma

=== United States ===
- Riverbend, California, community in Fresno County
- Riverbend, Columbus, Ohio, neighborhood of Columbus
- Riverbend (Hudson County), two sections of Hudson County, New Jersey
- Riverbend, Montana, census-designated place in Mineral County
- Riverbend (Tampa), a neighborhood within the City of Tampa, Florida
- Riverbend, Washington, census-designated place in King County
- Riverbend, Illinois, a small region part of the Metro East of the St Louis Metropolitan area

== Other ==
- Riverbend Apartments, in Atlanta, Georgia, United States
- Riverbend (blogger)
- Riverbend (estate) historic house in Kohler, Wisconsin
- Riverbend Festival, annual music festival in Chattanooga, Tennessee, United States
- Riverbend (film), a 1989 film directed by Sam Firstenberg
- Riverbend High School, in Spotsylvania, Virginia
- Riverbend Mall, in Rome, Georgia, United States
- Riverbend Maximum Security Institution, prison in Tennessee, United States
- Riverbend Music Center, live concert venue in Cincinnati, Ohio, United States

== See also ==
- River Bend (disambiguation)
