= High-top (disambiguation) =

High-top, High Top, Hi-Tops and Hitop may refer to:

- High-top, a style of shoes
- Hitop, West Virginia, an unincorporated community in Kanawha County
- High Top, a Thoroughbred racehorse
- Hi-Tops (film), a 1985 Christian movie

== See also ==
- Hi-top fade, a hairstyle
- HiTOP, a classification system of mental health problems
