= Norris W. Hensley =

American insurance agent

- Born: December 2, 1872; Kanawha County, West Virginia
- Died: October 24, 1940 (aged 67); Tampa, Florida
- Education: National Normal University
- Occupation: Insurance agent
- Spouse: Annie Laura Castor
- Children: 2

Norris Wilson Hensley (December 2, 1872 – October 24, 1940) was an insurance agent in Tampa, Florida.

== Early years and ancestry ==
Norris Wilson Hensley was born on December 2, 1872, near Charleston in Kanawha County, West Virginia to Mordecai Hensley and Julia Ann Emeline Melton.

His father's parents were William Hensley and Sarah Guthrie. Sarah was the daughter of James Guthrie, the namesake of Guthrie, West Virginia. His mother's parents were Daniel Melton and Elizabeth Kelly. Elizabeth was the daughter of Moses Kelly, who with his brother Aaron was an early settler of Union District on the Kanawha River.

Norris Hensley attended National Normal University in Lebanon, Ohio and Mountain State Business College in Parkersburg, West Virginia. He taught school in Milton, West Virginia.

He married Annie Laura Castor in Huntington, West Virginia on June 11, 1902. The ceremony was performed by W. L. Cocke.

== Tampa ==
=== Grocery ===
Hensley's first job in Tampa was working as a bookkeeper for the grocery business F. H. Davis & Co. He had a daughter, Florida Virginia Hensley, die as an infant on April 22, 1904.

=== Bank ===
He was a bookkeeper for the Exchange National Bank from 1904 to 1906. His only son Robert Burns Hensley was born February 2, 1905.

He was cashier and bank teller at the Bank of Tampa from 1907 to 1910, including during the Panic of 1907.

=== Insurance ===
With his brothers Emory and Fred Hensley, N. W. Hensley & Co. insurance firm was founded in 1910 and existed through the Florida Land Boom.

Hensley was an active Democrat and attended the 1924 Democratic National Convention as a supporter of William Gibbs McAdoo.

== Death and legacy ==
He died October 24, 1940. He was a member of the First Baptist Church under pastor Claude W. Duke. He was also a member of the Kiwanis Club.

The Hensley-Stovall Arcade at 420 Lafayette St. is named after him and Tampa Tribune publisher Wallace Stovall.
