= Hollyhurst =

Hollyhurst may refer to:

- Hollyhurst, West Virginia, unincorporated place in the United States
- Hollyhurst, Telford, electoral ward of Oakengates, Shropshire, England
- Hollyhurst, Shropshire, location in England, near Church Stretton, Shropshire, England
- Hollyhurst, Warwickshire, location in England
- Hollyhurst, hamlet divided between Marbury, Cheshire and Whitchurch, Shropshire, England
