= Republic, West Virginia =

- Unincorporated community
- Location within West Virginia and the United States Republic (the United States)
- Coordinates: 38°00′33″N 81°23′33″W
- Country: United States
- State: West Virginia
- County: Kanawha
- Elevation: 1,368 ft (417 m)
- Time zone: UTC-5 (Eastern (EST))
  - Summer (DST): UTC-4 (EDT)
- GNIS ID: 1555464

Republic is an unincorporated community in Kanawha County, West Virginia, United States, along Cabin Creek. It was also known as Jochin. Its post office is closed.
