= Campbells Creek =

Campbells Creek may refer to:

- Campbells Creek, Victoria, a town in Victoria, Australia
- Campbells Creek (West Virginia), a stream
