= River Bend =

River Bend may refer to:

- River Bend, North Carolina
- River Bend, Missouri
- River Bend, South Africa
- River Bend Nuclear Generating Station, located 24 miles NNW of Baton Rouge, Louisiana, owned and operated by Entergy Corporation
- River Bend (Illinois)
- River Bend, West Virginia

== See also ==
- Riverbend (disambiguation)
