= Fort Hill Historic District =

Fort Hill Historic District may refer to:

- Fort Hill Historic District (Northampton, Massachusetts)
- Fort Hill, Boston, neighborhood and historic district
- Fort Hill Rural Historic District, Eastham, Massachusetts
- Rogers Fort Hill Park Historic District, Lowell, Massachusetts
- Nelson Avenue-Fort Hill Historic District, Peekskill, New York

== See also ==
- Fort Hill (disambiguation)
