= Ward, West Virginia =

- Unincorporated community
- Location within West Virginia and the United States Ward (the United States)
- Coordinates: 38°14′47″N 81°23′17″W
- Country: United States
- State: West Virginia
- County: Kanawha
- Elevation: 709 ft (216 m)
- Time zone: UTC-5 (Eastern (EST))
  - Summer (DST): UTC-4 (EDT)
- GNIS ID: 1548785

Ward is an unincorporated community and coal town in Kanawha County, West Virginia, United States. Its post office is closed. Ward is approximately 3 miles (4.8 km) northeast of Cedar Grove, along Kellys Creek.

Some people say the community was named after Ward Hudnall.

Earlier accounts say the community was named after David Ward. The town of Ward was built on property owned by David Ward, who resided in Michigan. The property was leased to the Kelly's Creek Colliery Company. The Black Diamond, a coal periodical published by the National Coal Exchange in Chicago, Illinois, reported in Volume 32, Number 21, dated May 21, 1904, that the town of Ward was built by the Kelly's Creek Colliery Company in four months. Ward's son Charles Willis Ward was the Vice President of Kelly's Creek Colliery Company and the majority of the property is still owned by the estate of David Ward.
