= Donwood =

Donwood may refer to:

- Donwood, West Virginia, an unincorporated community and coal town in Kanawha County
- Stanley Donwood, the pen name of English writer Dan Rickwood
