= Lower Falls =

Lower Falls may refer to:

- Lower Falls, a named section of Yellowstone Falls in Wyoming
- Lower Falls (District Electoral Area), in Belfast, Northern Ireland
- Lower Falls, West Virginia
- Lower Falls (Yarmouth, Maine)
- Newton Lower Falls, a village of Newton, Massachusetts
