= Blue Creek, West Virginia =

Unincorporated community in West Virginia, United States

- Unincorporated community
- Location within West Virginia Location within the United States
- Coordinates: 38°27′02″N 81°27′26″W
- Country: United States
- State: West Virginia
- County: Kanawha
- Elevation: 620 ft (190 m)
- Time zone: UTC-5 (Eastern (EST))
  - Summer (DST): UTC-4 (EDT)
- ZIP code: 25026
- Area codes: 304 & 681
- GNIS feature ID: 1553929

Blue Creek is an unincorporated community in Kanawha County, West Virginia, United States. Blue Creek is located on the north bank of the Elk River, 1.5 miles (2.4 km) northeast of Elkview. Blue Creek has a post office with ZIP code 25026.
