= Pond Gap, West Virginia =

- Unincorporated community
- Location within West Virginia Location within the United States
- Coordinates: 38°16′41″N 81°16′43″W
- Country: United States
- State: West Virginia
- County: Kanawha
- Elevation: 1,070 ft (330 m)
- Time zone: UTC-5 (Eastern (EST))
  - Summer (DST): UTC-4 (EDT)
- ZIP code: 25160
- Area codes: 304 & 681
- GNIS feature ID: 1545129

Pond Gap is an unincorporated community in Kanawha County, West Virginia, United States. Pond Gap is 7 miles (11 km) north-northeast of Smithers. Pond Gap has a post office with ZIP code 25160.

The community was so named on account of there being a pond and mountain pass near the original town site.
