= Crede, West Virginia =

Unincorporated community in West Virginia, United States

- Unincorporated community
- Location in West Virginia and the United States Crede (the United States)
- Coordinates: 38°23′46″N 81°33′45″W
- Country: United States
- State: West Virginia
- County: Kanawha
- Time zone: UTC-5 (Eastern (EST))
  - Summer (DST): UTC-4 (EDT)

Crede is an unincorporated community along U.S. Route 119 in Kanawha County, West Virginia, United States, located between Elk Hills and Big Chimney. Crede is mostly residential, but there are many small places of business. It is not listed on most maps, but is on some atlases.
