= West Dunbar, West Virginia =

- Census-designated place
- Location within West Virginia Location within the United States
- Coordinates: 38°22′23″N 81°45′19″W
- Country: United States
- State: West Virginia
- County: Kanawha

Area
  - Total: 0.24 sq mi (0.63 km^{2})
  - Land: 0.22 sq mi (0.58 km^{2})
  - Water: 0.019 sq mi (0.05 km^{2})
- Elevation: 605 ft (184 m)

Population (2020)
  - Total: 617
- Time zone: UTC-5 (Eastern (EST))
  - Summer (DST): UTC-4 (EDT)
- ZIP Code: 25064 (Dunbar)
- Area codes: 304/681
- FIPS code: 54-85636
- GNIS feature ID: 2807493

West Dunbar is an unincorporated community and census-designated place (CDP) in Kanawha County, West Virginia, United States. As of the 2020 census, it had a population of 617.

West Dunbar is in the western part of the county, on the north side of the Kanawha River valley. It is bordered to the south and east by the city of Dunbar. West Virginia Route 25 (Fairlawn Avenue) forms the northeast border of the community. Route 25 leads southeast into Dunbar and east 8 miles (13 km) to Charleston, the state capital, while in the other direction it leads northwest 6 miles (10 km) to Nitro. Interstate 64 runs parallel to Route 25 just outside the CDP; the closest highway access is from Exit 50, 1 mile (1.6 km) to the northwest in Institute, or from Exit 53, 1.5 miles (2.4 km) to the southeast in Dunbar.
