= Carbon, West Virginia =

Unincorporated community in West Virginia, United States

- Unincorporated community
- Location within West Virginia Location within the United States
- Coordinates: 38°01′10″N 81°24′22″W
- Country: United States
- State: West Virginia
- County: Kanawha
- Elevation: 1,220 ft (370 m)
- Time zone: UTC-5 (Eastern (EST))
  - Summer (DST): UTC-4 (EDT)
- ZIP codes: 25037
- Area codes: 304 & 681
- GNIS feature ID: 1554070

Carbon is an unincorporated community in Kanawha County, West Virginia, United States, along Cabin Creek. Carbon is 7.5 miles (12.1 km) northeast of Whitesville.

The community took its name from the Carbon Fuel Company.
