= Kelly Park =

Kelly Park may refer to:

== Parks ==
- Albert Kelly Park, a park in southwest Portland, Oregon, USA
- Dr. Howard A. Kelly Park, a park in Orange County, Florida, USA
- Edward J. Kelly Park, a park located in Washington, D.C., USA
- J.J. Kelly Park, a park in Wollongong, a city in New South Wales, Australia
- Kelley Point Park, a city park in north Portland, Oregon, USA
- Kelly Butte Natural Area, a city park in southeast Portland, Oregon, USA
- Kelly Ingram Park, a park in Birmingham, Alabama, USA
- Kelly Park, a community park in Indianapolis, Indiana, USA
- Kelly Park, a park in Brooklyn, New York City, USA
- Kelly Park (Compton), a park in Compton, California

== People ==
- Kelly Coffield Park, an American actress and comedian

== See also ==
- Kelly Hill (disambiguation)
