= Guthrie, West Virginia =

- Unincorporated community
- Location within West Virginia and the United States Guthrie (the United States)
- Coordinates: 38°24′22″N 81°39′41″W
- Country: United States
- State: West Virginia
- County: Kanawha
- Elevation: 604 ft (184 m)
- Time zone: UTC-5 (Eastern (EST))
  - Summer (DST): UTC-4 (EDT)
- GNIS ID: 1539800

Guthrie is an unincorporated community in Kanawha County, West Virginia, United States, near Twomile Creek. Guthrie is named after James Guthrie who settled in the area around 1798. In 1800 he married Elizabeth Casdorph. (Note: Castor, Casdorph, or Karsdorp is a Dutch, Mennonite family name.)

They had nine children, including Sarah, the grandmother of Tampa insurance agent Norris W. Hensley. James Guthrie's second wife was Judith Hensley.

The Bonham Dairy was founded in Guthrie in 1924, once "the most up-to-date dairy in West Virginia".
