= Mammoth, West Virginia =

- Unincorporated community
- Location within West Virginia Location within the United States
- Coordinates: 38°15′48″N 81°22′19″W
- Country: United States
- State: West Virginia
- County: Kanawha
- Elevation: 787 ft (240 m)
- Time zone: UTC-5 (Eastern (EST))
  - Summer (DST): UTC-4 (EDT)
- ZIP code: 25132
- Area codes: 304 & 681
- GNIS feature ID: 1555033

Mammoth is an unincorporated community in Kanawha County, West Virginia, United States. Mammoth is 4.5 miles (7.2 km) northeast of Cedar Grove, along Kellys Creek. Mammoth has a post office with ZIP code 25132.
