= Etowah, West Virginia =

Unincorporated community in Kanawha County, WV, United States

- Unincorporated community
- Location within West Virginia and the United States Etowah (the United States)
- Coordinates: 38°22′34″N 81°36′3″W
- Country: United States
- State: West Virginia
- County: Kanawha
- Elevation: 610 ft (190 m)
- Time zone: UTC-5 (Eastern (EST))
  - Summer (DST): UTC-4 (EDT)
- GNIS ID: 1554415

Etowah is an unincorporated community in Kanawha County, West Virginia, United States.

The name Etowah is Native American in origin.
