= Decota, West Virginia =

Unincorporated community in West Virginia, United States

- Unincorporated community
- Location within West Virginia Location within the United States
- Coordinates: 38°01′04″N 81°25′14″W
- Country: United States
- State: West Virginia
- County: Kanawha
- Elevation: 1,125 ft (343 m)
- Time zone: UTC-5 (Eastern (EST))
  - Summer (DST): UTC-4 (EDT)
- Area codes: 304 & 681
- GNIS feature ID: 1538099

Decota is an unincorporated community in Kanawha County, West Virginia, United States. Decota is 7 miles (11 km) northeast of Whitesville along Cabin Creek.

Decota is a name derived from the Dakota language meaning "allies".
