= Quick, West Virginia =

- Unincorporated community
- Location within West Virginia and the United States Quick (the United States)
- Coordinates: 38°22′21″N 81°24′07″W
- Country: United States
- State: West Virginia
- County: Kanawha
- Time zone: UTC-5 (Eastern (EST))
  - Summer (DST): UTC-4 (EDT)
- GNIS feature ID: 1545346

Quick is a small unincorporated community in Kanawha County, West Virginia, United States. It is located along Indian Creek Road (County Route 49).

Quick has a church and community center, as well as a few other small community places.

== Etymology ==
Quick was most likely named after the local Quick family. Some members of the Quick family are buried at the Quick Community Cemetery.
