= Laing, West Virginia =

- Unincorporated community
- Location within West Virginia and the United States Laing (the United States)
- Coordinates: 38°2′11″N 81°25′41″W
- Country: United States
- State: West Virginia
- County: Kanawha
- Elevation: 1,040 ft (320 m)
- Time zone: UTC-5 (Eastern (EST))
  - Summer (DST): UTC-4 (EDT)
- GNIS ID: 1554901

Laing is an unincorporated community in Kanawha County, West Virginia, United States, along Cabin Creek.

The community was named after one Mr. Laing, a mining official.
