= Hugheston, West Virginia =

- Unincorporated community
- Location within West Virginia Location within the United States
- Coordinates: 38°12′34″N 81°22′21″W
- Country: United States
- State: West Virginia
- County: Kanawha

Area
  - Total: 15.4 sq mi (40 km^{2})
  - Land: 15.4 sq mi (40 km^{2})
  - Water: 0 sq mi (0 km^{2})
- Elevation: 636 ft (194 m)

Population (2000)
  - Total: 569
  - Density: 36.95/sq mi (14.27/km^{2})
- Time zone: UTC-5 (Eastern (EST))
  - Summer (DST): UTC-4 (EDT)
- ZIP code: 25110
- Area codes: 304 & 681
- GNIS feature ID: 1554756

Hugheston is an unincorporated community in Kanawha County, West Virginia, United States. Hugheston is located on the north bank of the Kanawha River across from Pratt. Hugheston has a post office with ZIP code 25110. The average household income is $32,436.

The community most likely derives its name from Robert Hughes, a local pioneer who was kidnapped by Native Americans.

Historian and author Otis K. Rice was born in Hugheston on June 6, 1919. Rice was named West Virginia's first Historian Laureate in 2003.
