= Eskdale, West Virginia =

Unincorporated community in West Virginia, United States

- Unincorporated community
- Location within West Virginia Location within the United States
- Coordinates: 38°05′28″N 81°26′37″W
- Country: United States
- State: West Virginia
- County: Kanawha
- Elevation: 807 ft (246 m)
- Time zone: UTC-5 (Eastern (EST))
  - Summer (DST): UTC-4 (EDT)
- ZIP code: 25075
- Area codes: 304 & 681
- GNIS feature ID: 1538735

Eskdale is an unincorporated community and coal town in Kanawha County, West Virginia, United States. Eskdale is 9 miles (14 km) south of East Bank along Cabin Creek. Eskdale has a post office with ZIP code 25075.
