= Holly, West Virginia =

- Unincorporated community
- Location within West Virginia and the United States Holly (the United States)
- Coordinates: 38°3′42″N 81°26′37″W
- Country: United States
- State: West Virginia
- County: Kanawha
- Elevation: 906 ft (276 m)
- Time zone: UTC-5 (Eastern (EST))
  - Summer (DST): UTC-4 (EDT)
- GNIS ID: 1554726

Holly is an unincorporated community in Kanawha County, West Virginia, United States, situated along Cabin Creek.
