= Rutledge, West Virginia =

- Unincorporated community
- Location within West Virginia and the United States Rutledge (the United States)
- Coordinates: 38°21′51″N 81°32′25″W
- Country: United States
- State: West Virginia
- County: Kanawha
- Elevation: 748 ft (228 m)
- Time zone: UTC-5 (Eastern (EST))
  - Summer (DST): UTC-4 (EDT)
- GNIS ID: 1546197

Rutledge is an unincorporated community in Kanawha County, West Virginia, United States.
