= Dry Branch, West Virginia =

Unincorporated community in Kanawah County, West Virginia, U.S.

- Unincorporated community
- Location within West Virginia Location within the United States
- Coordinates: 38°10′48″N 81°28′00″W
- Country: United States
- State: West Virginia
- County: Kanawha
- Elevation: 630 ft (190 m)
- Time zone: UTC-5 (Eastern (EST))
  - Summer (DST): UTC-4 (EDT)
- ZIP code: 25061
- Area codes: 304 & 681
- GNIS feature ID: 1554329

Dry Branch is an unincorporated community in Kanawha County, West Virginia, United States. Dry Branch is 3 miles (4.8 km) southwest of East Bank, along Cabin Creek. Dry Branch has a post office with ZIP code 25061.

The community takes its name from nearby Dry Branch creek.
