= Etawah (disambiguation) =

Etawah is a municipality in Uttar Pradesh, India.

Etawah can also refer to:

- Etawah District, district surrounding the municipality
- Etawah (Lok Sabha constituency), constituency in the Lok Sabha
- Etawah railway station
- Etawah Gharana, a musical lineage founded by Imdad Khan
- Etawah Wildlife Safari Park, planned drive-through wildlife park in Etawah

== See also ==
- Etowah (disambiguation)
