= Rock Lake Village, Kanawha County, West Virginia =

Rock Lake Village
- Unincorporated community
- Location within the state of West Virginia Rock Lake Village (the United States)
- Coordinates: 38°20′50″N 81°44′27″W
- Country: United States
- State: West Virginia
- County: Kanawha
- Elevation: 673 ft (205 m)
- Time zone: UTC-5 (Eastern (EST))
  - Summer (DST): UTC-4 (EDT)
- GNIS ID: 1555501

Rock Lake Village is an unincorporated community in Kanawha County, West Virginia, United States.
