= Island Branch, West Virginia =

- Unincorporated community
- Location within West Virginia and the United States Island Branch (the United States)
- Coordinates: 38°34′42″N 81°31′54″W
- Country: United States
- State: West Virginia
- County: Kanawha
- Elevation: 643 ft (196 m)
- Time zone: UTC-5 (Eastern (EST))
  - Summer (DST): UTC-4 (EDT)
- GNIS feature ID: 1554784

Island Branch is an unincorporated community located in Kanawha County, West Virginia, United States.

The community took its name from a small river island near the original town site.
