= Blundon, West Virginia =

Unincorporated community in West Virginia, United States

- Unincorporated community
- Location in West Virginia and the United States Blundon (the United States)
- Coordinates: 38°32′24″N 81°31′14″W
- Country: United States
- State: West Virginia
- County: Kanawha
- Elevation: 728 ft (222 m)
- Time zone: UTC-5 (Eastern (EST))
  - Summer (DST): UTC-4 (EDT)
- GNIS ID: 1536153

Blundon is an unincorporated community in Kanawha County, West Virginia, United States.

The community has the name of Major Edgar B. Blundon, a Civil War veteran.
