= Jarretts Ford, West Virginia =

- Unincorporated community
- Location within West Virginia and the United States Jarretts Ford (the United States)
- Coordinates: 38°25′53″N 81°29′9″W
- Country: United States
- State: West Virginia
- County: Kanawha
- Elevation: 617 ft (188 m)
- Time zone: UTC-5 (Eastern (EST))
  - Summer (DST): UTC-4 (EDT)
- GNIS ID: 1554797

Jarretts Ford is an unincorporated community in Kanawha County, West Virginia, United States.

The community was named for a ford located near Eli Jarrett's property.
