= Knee (geography) =

River bend over 90 degrees

A knee, or river knee, is a bend in a river changing its course greatly, suddenly to a different general direction (in an angle of around 90 degrees). It is different from most (one-off) riverbends, and from a (particular) meander which connotes one of several bends in a sinuous course, without changing the general direction.

Knees navigable by large vessels or set in upland areas or arid drainage basins were similar to major confluences in that they were particularly suitable for trade and defense, and therefore gave rise to forts, governing army camps or cities.

Many major world rivers have such a notable knee close to major settled places:

- the Rhine knee in Basel, Switzerland is the river's greatest knee – others are in German cities Wiesbaden and Bingen
- the Danube knee in Vác, Hungary (35 km north of Budapest)
- the Volga knee at Volgograd, Russia
- the upper Rhône knee at Martigny, Switzerland
- the Petitcodiac knee at Moncton, New Brunswick, Canada, locally known as Le Coude
- The Irawaddy knee at Mandalay

Some riverbends are in some places referred to "knees" but are bends largely unaffecting the course or a small sharp meander:

- the "Vltava knee" in Prague, Czech Republic
- the "Elbe knee" at Königstein Fortress, Germany
- the "Rhine knee" at Düsseldorf, Germany (see also de:Rheinkniebrücke)
