= Etowah =

Etowah is a Muskogee (Creek) word (Muscogee spelling: italwa) for 'town'/'people'/'tribe', and may also refer to:

== Places in the United States ==
- The Etowah River in Georgia
- Etowah, Arkansas
- Etowah, Georgia
- Etowah, North Carolina
- Etowah, Oklahoma
- Etowah, Tennessee
- Etowah, West Virginia
- Etowah County, Alabama
- Etowah Indian Mounds in Bartow County, Georgia

== Other ==
- Etowah (horse), the 1913 winner of the Kentucky Futurity trotting stakes race

== See also ==
- Etawah (disambiguation), place names in India
