= Sanderson, West Virginia =

- Unincorporated community
- Location within West Virginia and the United States Sanderson (the United States)
- Coordinates: 38°21′52″N 81°22′5″W
- Country: United States
- State: West Virginia
- County: Kanawha
- Elevation: 718 ft (219 m)
- Time zone: UTC-5 (Eastern (EST))
  - Summer (DST): UTC-4 (EDT)
- GNIS ID: 1555565

Sanderson is an unincorporated community in Kanawha County, West Virginia, United States.
