= Kendalia, West Virginia =

- Unincorporated community
- Location within West Virginia and the United States Kendalia (the United States)
- Coordinates: 38°20′11″N 81°18′47″W
- Country: United States
- State: West Virginia
- County: Kanawha
- Elevation: 856 ft (261 m)
- Time zone: UTC-5 (Eastern (EST))
  - Summer (DST): UTC-4 (EDT)
- GNIS ID: 1549770

Kendalia is an unincorporated community in Kanawha County, West Virginia, United States.

The community derives its name from one Mr. Kendall, an original owner of the town site.
