= Ivydale, Kanawha County, West Virginia =

Ivydale, West Virginia
- Unincorporated community
- Location within West Virginia Location within the United States
- Coordinates: 38°18′36″N 81°42′16″W
- Country: United States
- State: West Virginia
- County: Kanawha
- Elevation: 679 ft (207 m)
- Time zone: UTC-5 (Eastern (EST))
  - Summer (DST): UTC-4 (EDT)
- Area codes: 304 & 681
- GNIS feature ID: 1549757

Ivydale is an unincorporated community in Kanawha County, West Virginia, United States. Ivydale is 5 miles (8.0 km) southwest of Charleston.
