= Coalfield, West Virginia =

Unincorporated community in West Virginia, United States

- Unincorporated community
- Location within West Virginia Location within the United States
- Coordinates: 38°00′16″N 81°21′1″W
- Country: United States
- State: West Virginia
- County: Fayette
- Elevation: 1,001 ft (305 m)
- Time zone: UTC-5 (Eastern (EST))
  - Summer (DST): UTC-4 (EDT)
- GNIS ID: 1554165

Coalfield is an unincorporated community in Fayette County, West Virginia, United States. It was also called Krebs.
