= Acup, West Virginia =

- Unincorporated community
- Location in West Virginia and the United States Acup (the United States)
- Coordinates: 38°21′43″N 81°20′31″W
- Country: United States
- State: West Virginia
- County: Kanawha
- Elevation: 758 ft (231 m)
- Time zone: UTC-5 (Eastern (EST))
  - Summer (DST): UTC-4 (EDT)
- GNIS ID: 1553690

Acup was an unincorporated community in Kanawha County, West Virginia, United States. Acme was located along Blue Creek. The community was a camp of the Middle Fork Block Coal Company, which operated in the early 20th century. The post office at Acup was also known as Firmwood Park and Middle Fork.
