= Putney, West Virginia =

- Unincorporated community
- Location within West Virginia and the United States Putney (the United States)
- Coordinates: 38°17′47″N 81°22′22″W
- Country: United States
- State: West Virginia
- County: Kanawha
- Elevation: 1,211 ft (369 m)
- Time zone: UTC-5 (Eastern (EST))
  - Summer (DST): UTC-4 (EDT)
- GNIS ID: 1549887

Putney is an unincorporated community in Kanawha County, West Virginia, United States. Its post office is closed.

The community was named after Mose Putney, a local merchant.

== See also ==
- List of ghost towns in West Virginia
