= Dickinson, West Virginia =

Unincorporated community in West Virginia, United States

- Unincorporated community
- Location within West Virginia Location within the United States
- Coordinates: 38°12′13″N 81°30′09″W
- Country: United States
- State: West Virginia
- County: Kanawha
- Elevation: 630 ft (190 m)
- Time zone: UTC-5 (Eastern (EST))
  - Summer (DST): UTC-4 (EDT)
- Area codes: 304 & 681
- GNIS feature ID: 1550920

Dickinson, also known as Quincy, is an unincorporated community in Kanawha County, West Virginia, United States. Dickinson is located on the north bank of the Kanawha River, 3 miles (4.8 km) southeast of Belle. The community is served by U.S. Route 60.

The community was named after John Quincy Dickinson, the original owner of the town site.
