= Annfred, West Virginia =

Unincorporated community in West Virginia, United States

- Unincorporated community
- Location in West Virginia and the United States Annfred (the United States)
- Coordinates: 38°18′15″N 81°24′49″W
- Country: United States
- State: West Virginia
- County: Kanawha
- Elevation: 1,217 ft (371 m)
- Time zone: UTC-5 (Eastern (EST))
  - Summer (DST): UTC-4 (EDT)
- GNIS ID: 1742027

Annfred is an unincorporated community in Kanawha County, West Virginia, United States.

The name Annfred is a portmanteau of Anna and Fred, honoring a railroad worker and his wife.
