= Dawes, West Virginia =

Unincorporated community in West Virginia, United States

- Unincorporated community
- Location within West Virginia Location within the United States
- Coordinates: 38°08′34″N 81°27′07″W
- Country: United States
- State: West Virginia
- County: Kanawha

Area
  - Total: 21.08 sq mi (54.6 km^{2})
  - Land: 21.08 sq mi (54.6 km^{2})
  - Water: 0 sq mi (0 km^{2})
- Elevation: 679 ft (207 m)

Population (2000)
  - Total: 656
  - Density: 31.13/sq mi (12.02/km^{2})
- Time zone: UTC-5 (Eastern (EST))
  - Summer (DST): UTC-4 (EDT)
- ZIP code: 25054
- Area codes: 304 & 681
- GNIS feature ID: 1538069

Dawes is an unincorporated community in Kanawha County, West Virginia, United States. Dawes is 5 miles (8.0 km) south of East Bank along Cabin Creek. Dawes has a post office with ZIP code 25054.
