= Tad, Markazi =

Tad طاد
- Village
- Location within Iran
- Coordinates: 34°42′19″N 49°59′37″E
- Country: Iran
- Province: Markazi
- County: Tafresh
- Bakhsh: Central
- Rural District: Bazarjan

Population (2006)
  - Total: 89
- Time zone: UTC+3:30 (IRST)
  - Summer (DST): UTC+4:30 (IRDT)

Tad (Persian: طاد, also Romanized as Ţād and Tād) is a village in Bazarjan Rural District, in the Central District of Tafresh County, Markazi Province, Iran. At the 2006 census, its population was 89, in 32 families.
