= Tad, West Virginia =

- Unincorporated community
- Location within West Virginia Location within the United States
- Coordinates: 38°20′00″N 81°29′39″W
- Country: United States
- State: West Virginia
- County: Kanawha
- Elevation: 650 ft (200 m)
- Time zone: UTC-5 (Eastern (EST))
  - Summer (DST): UTC-4 (EDT)
- ZIP code: 25201
- Area codes: 304 & 681
- GNIS feature ID: 1547870

Tad is an unincorporated community in Kanawha County, West Virginia, United States. Tad is 7.5 miles (12.1 km) east of Charleston. Tad has a post office with ZIP code 25201.

An early postmaster gave the community the name of his son, Talmadge "Tad" Dunlap.
