= Kelly Hill, West Virginia =

- Unincorporated community
- Location within West Virginia and the United States Kelly Hill (the United States)
- Coordinates: 38°28′59″N 81°21′48″W
- Country: United States
- State: West Virginia
- County: Kanawha
- Elevation: 630 ft (190 m)

Population (2000)
  - Total: 117
- Time zone: UTC-5 (Eastern (EST))
  - Summer (DST): UTC-4 (EDT)
- ZIP codes: 25045
- Area code: 304/681
- GNIS ID: 1554858

Kelly Hill is an unincorporated community in Kanawha County, West Virginia, United States.
