= Elk Hills, West Virginia =

Unincorporated community in West Virginia, United States

- Unincorporated community
- Location in West Virginia and the United States Elk Hills (the United States)
- Coordinates: 38°24′00″N 81°34′24″W
- Country: United States
- State: West Virginia
- County: Kanawha
- Time zone: UTC-5 (Eastern (EST))
  - Summer (DST): UTC-4 (EDT)

Elk Hills is an unincorporated community in central Kanawha County, West Virginia, United States. It lies on U.S. Route 119 along the Elk River, between the communities of Mink Shoals and Crede.
