= Ohley, West Virginia =

- Unincorporated community
- Location within West Virginia Location within the United States
- Coordinates: 38°06′25″N 81°26′56″W
- Country: United States
- State: West Virginia
- County: Kanawha
- Elevation: 764 ft (233 m)
- Time zone: UTC-5 (Eastern (EST))
  - Summer (DST): UTC-4 (EDT)
- Area codes: 304 & 681
- GNIS feature ID: 1555260

Ohley is an unincorporated community in Kanawha County, West Virginia, United States. Ohley is 8 miles (13 km) south of East Bank along Cabin Creek.
