= Donwood, West Virginia =

Unincorporated community in West Virginia, United States

- Unincorporated community
- Location within West Virginia Location within the United States
- Coordinates: 38°9′44″N 81°19′55″W
- Country: United States
- State: West Virginia
- Counties: Kanawha, Fayette
- Elevation: 738 ft (225 m)
- Time zone: UTC-5 (Eastern (EST))
  - Summer (DST): UTC-4 (EDT)
- FIPS code: 1554319

Donwood is an unincorporated community and coal town in Kanawha and Fayette counties, West Virginia, United States.
