= Meadowbrook, Kanawha County, West Virginia =

Meadowbrook, West Virginia
- Unincorporated community
- Location within West Virginia Location within the United States
- Coordinates: 38°22′52″N 81°33′42″W
- Country: United States
- State: West Virginia
- County: Kanawha
- Elevation: 646 ft (197 m)
- Time zone: UTC-5 (Eastern (EST))
  - Summer (DST): UTC-4 (EDT)
- Area codes: 304 & 681
- GNIS feature ID: 1555096

Meadowbrook is an unincorporated community in Kanawha County, West Virginia, United States. Meadowbrook is located on West Virginia Route 114, 4 miles (6.4 km) northeast of Charleston.
