= Fivemile, West Virginia =

Unincorporated community in West Virginia, United States

- Unincorporated community
- Location within West Virginia and the United States Fivemile (the United States)
- Coordinates: 38°20′43″N 81°28′42″W
- Country: United States
- State: West Virginia
- County: Kanawha
- Elevation: 676 ft (206 m)
- Time zone: UTC-5 (Eastern (EST))
  - Summer (DST): UTC-4 (EDT)
- GNIS ID: 1539022

Fivemile is an unincorporated community in Kanawha County, West Virginia, United States.
