= Kelly Hills =

- Yankunytjatjara: Aputjilpi
- Location within Northern Territory

Highest point
- Elevation: 870 m (2,850 ft)
- Coordinates: 25°51′54″S 131°26′52″E

Geography
- Country: Australia
- Territory: Northern Territory
- Locality: Petermann
- Range coordinates: 25°49′S 131°25′E

Geology
- Rock age: Paleoproterozoic
- Rock type(s): gneiss, quartzite

The Kelly Hills (Yankunytjatjara: Aputjilpi) are a mountain range at the southern end of the Northern Territory of Australia. It is located in the locality of Petermann directly north of the Musgrave Ranges and about 50 kilometres (31 mi) northeast of Amaṯa in South Australia. Its highest point is about 870 metres (2,850 ft) above sea level. Mount Robert, at the eastern end of the range, is about 796 metres (2,612 ft) above sea level. The area is known as Aputjilpinya in the native Yankunytjatjara language. It forms part of an important Mala Dreaming track that runs between Uluṟu and Ulkiya.

There are a few soakages located within the hills. One of them, Puntitjara, was recorded by several early White explorers travelling through the Kelly Hills. The South Australian government's North-West Prospecting Expedition, led by Lawrence Wells, was brought there by an Aboriginal guide in 1903; one of the expedition's prospectors, Herbert Basedow, recorded the name as "Punndijarrinna" and reported that it was a good source of water. Basedow returned to Puntitjara in June 1926 on another expedition, this one led by Donald Mackay. According to Mackay, they found it dry and covered with a layer of sand. The anthropologist Ted Strehlow visited Puntitjara in August 1936, but founded it covered by mud.
