= Coal Fork, West Virginia =

- Census-designated place (CDP)
- Location in Kanawha County and state of West Virginia.
- Coordinates: 38°19′2″N 81°31′37″W
- Country: United States
- State: West Virginia
- County: Kanawha

Area
  - Total: 5.1 sq mi (13.3 km^{2})
  - Land: 5.1 sq mi (13.3 km^{2})
  - Water: 0 sq mi (0.0 km^{2})
- Elevation: 650 ft (198 m)

Population (2020)
  - Total: 1,039
  - Density: 202/sq mi (78.1/km^{2})
- Time zone: UTC-5 (Eastern (EST))
  - Summer (DST): UTC-4 (EDT)
- Area code: 304
- FIPS code: 54-16612
- GNIS feature ID: 1537443

Coal Fork is an unincorporated census-designated place (CDP) in Kanawha County, West Virginia, United States. It is part of a larger unincorporated community known as Campbells Creek, approximately 10 minutes east of Charleston. The population was 1,039 at the 2020 census (down from 1,233 at the 2010 census).

== Geography ==
Coal Fork is located at 38°19′2″N 81°31′37″W (38.317216, -81.526864).

According to the United States Census Bureau, the Coal Fork CDP has a total area of 5.1 square miles (13.3 km^{2}), all land.

== Demographics ==
As of the census of 2000, there were 1,350 people, 581 households, and 415 families living in the community. The population density was 262.8 people per square mile (101.4/km^{2}). There were 614 housing units at an average density of 119.5/sq mi (46.1/km^{2}). The racial makeup of the community was 98.67% White, 0.30% African American, 0.15% Native American, and 0.89% from two or more races. Hispanic or Latino of any race were 0.67% of the population.

There were 581 households, out of which 24.8% had children under the age of 18 living with them, 54.2% were married couples living together, 13.4% had a female householder with no husband present, and 28.4% were non-families. 26.3% of all households were made up of individuals, and 13.8% had someone living alone who was 65 years of age or older. The average household size was 2.32 and the average family size was 2.75.

The community's age distribution is 19.7% under the age of 18, 6.7% from 18 to 24, 26.7% from 25 to 44, 28.0% from 45 to 64, and 18.9% who were 65 years of age or older. The median age was 43 years. For every 100 females, there were 95.1 males. For every 100 females age 18 and over, there were 91.5 males.

The median income for a household in the community was $26,250, and the median income for a family was $29,808. Males had a median income of $25,568 versus $21,667 for females. The per capita income for the community was $14,002. About 16.5% of families and 18.0% of the population were below the poverty line, including 17.0% of those under age 18 and 10.9% of those age 65 or over.
