= Riverbend Apartments =

Complex known in the 1970s for its singles scene

Coordinates: 33.897359°N 84.448909°W

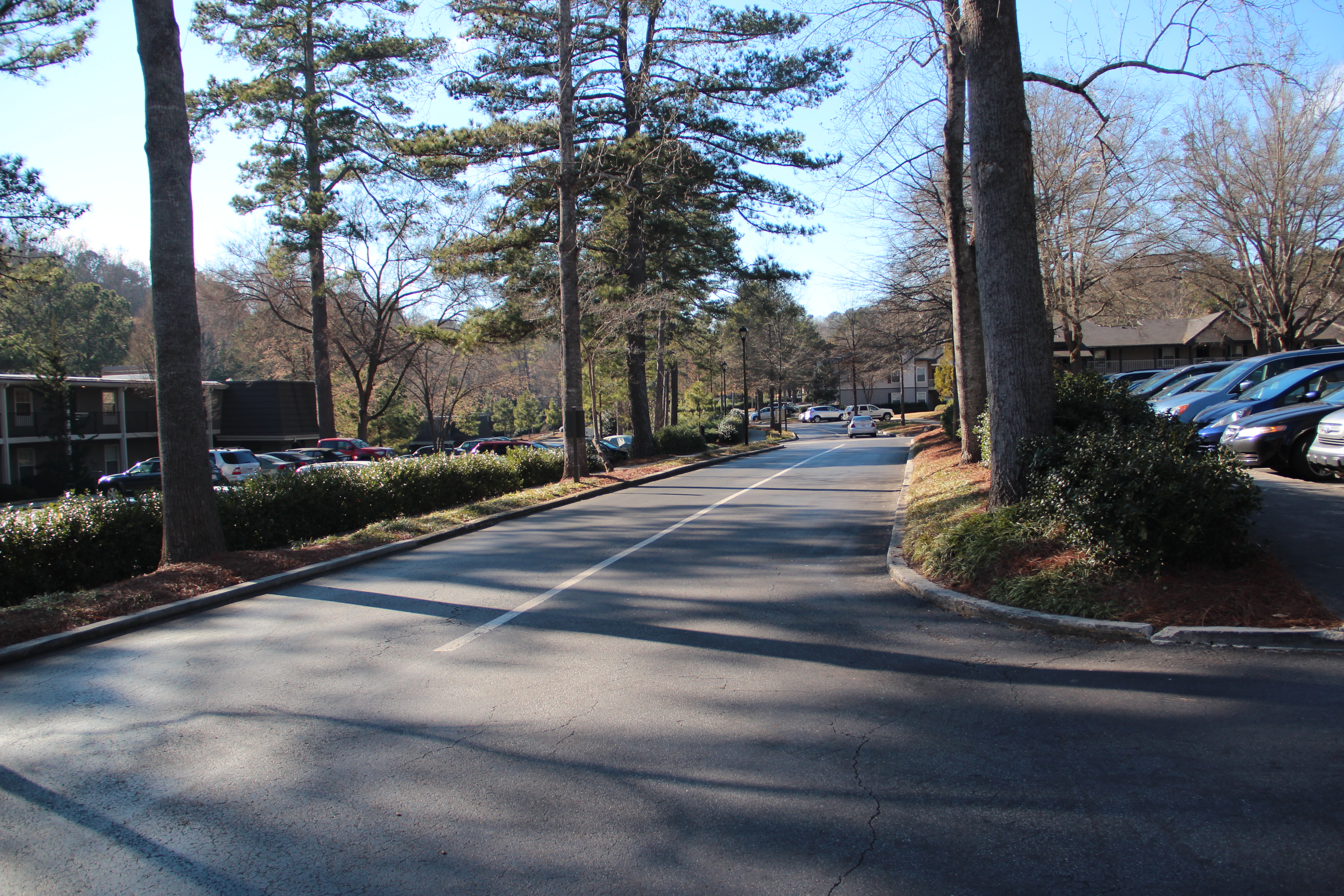
Riverbend Apartments is currently known as Walton on the Chattahoochee (pictured here in 2018)

Riverbend Apartments was an infamous 600-unit apartment complex located in suburban Atlanta, Georgia, off Interstate 285. It has been described as Atlanta's most notorious singles complex. The apartment complex was also the plot setting for part of the 2002 film Catch Me If You Can.

== History ==
Located in Cumberland district of Atlanta, Riverbend got its name from the fact that it overlooked a bend in the Chattahoochee River. Developed by Crow, Pope & Land Enterprises in the early 1970s, Riverbend was one of the 1970s Atlanta's most notorious landmarks of sexual hedonism. It was named by Playboy as ground zero of the Sexual Revolution, due to its clubhouse keggers and nude pool parties. By the late 1970s, laws that prohibited "no-children-allowed" apartments were passed, and the singles scene shifted elsewhere as residents married or moved to newer complexes. It has since been redesigned, and is now known as "Walton on the Chattahoochee."
