= Cinco, West Virginia =

Unincorporated community in West Virginia, United States

- Unincorporated community
- Location within West Virginia Location within the United States
- Coordinates: 38°20′13″N 81°27′58″W
- Country: United States
- State: West Virginia
- County: Kanawha
- Elevation: 696 ft (212 m)
- Time zone: UTC-5 (Eastern (EST))
  - Summer (DST): UTC-4 (EDT)
- FIPS code: 1554136

Cinco is an unincorporated community in Kanawha County, West Virginia, United States.

Cinco is 690 feet [210 m] above sea level. It lies in the Eastern Time Zone (EST/EDT) and observes daylight saving time. The telephone area codes for Cinco are 304 & 681.

The community was named by a mining official, who preferred Cinco brand cigars.
