= Nelson Avenue–Fort Hill Historic District =

Historic district in New York, United States

- U.S. National Register of Historic Places
- U.S. Historic district
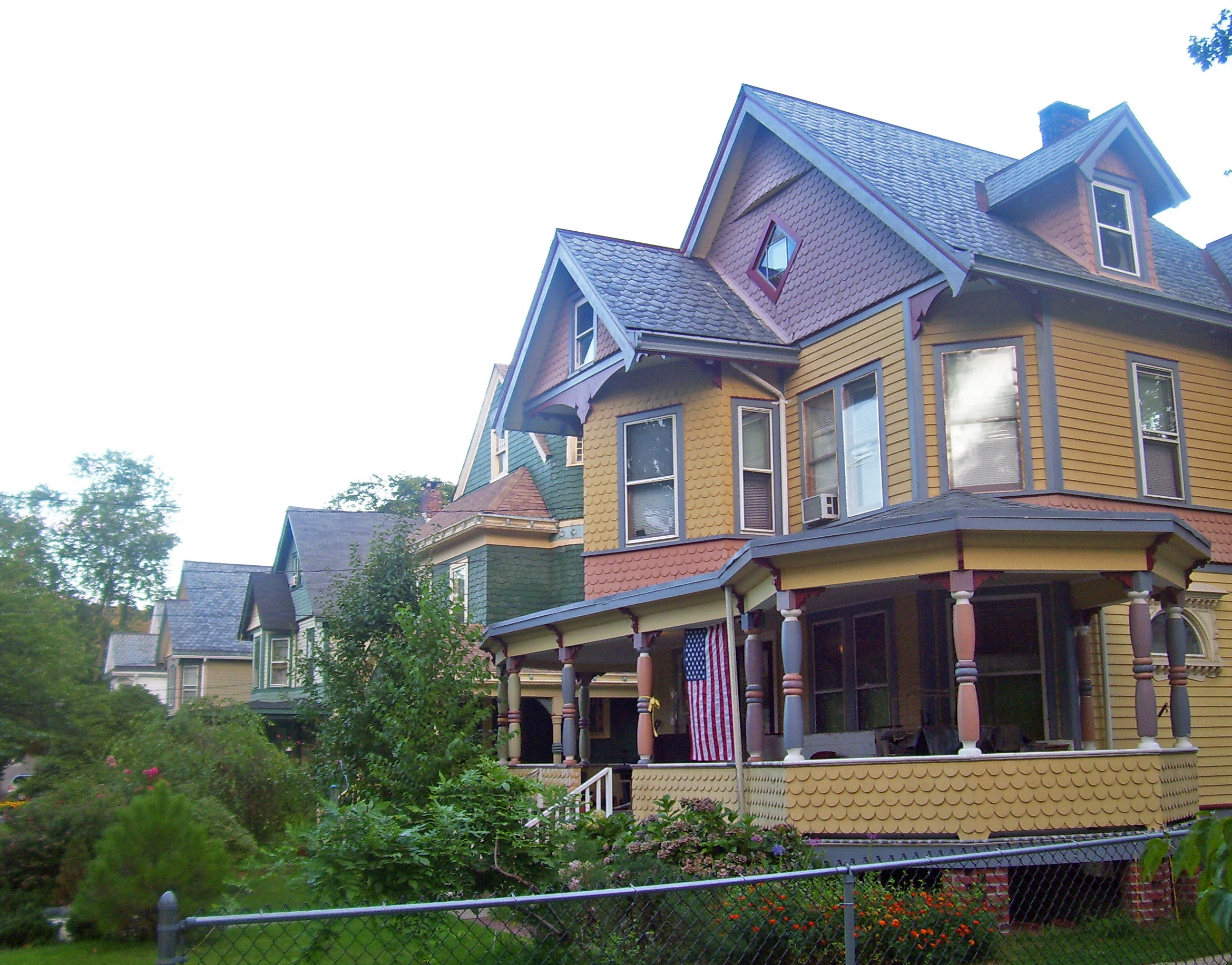
- Houses on Orchard Street, 2008

- Location within New York Location within the United States
- Location: Roughly along Nelson Ave., John St., Diven St., Constant St., Orchard St., Pauling St., and Decatur Ave., Peekskill, New York
- Coordinates: 41°17′41″N 73°55′21″W
- Area: 30 acres (12 ha)
- Built: late 19th century
- Architect: Lamos, Charles; Hill, Eugene
- Architectural style: Mid 19th Century Revival, Late 19th And 20th Century Revivals
- NRHP reference No.: 06000335
- Added to NRHP: May 4, 2006

The Nelson Avenue–Fort Hill Historic District is a residential neighborhood in northwestern Peekskill, Westchester County, New York, United States. It encompasses 195 contributing buildings, 3 contributing sites, and 1 contributing object and contains many late 19th-century homes in relatively intact condition.

It was listed on the National Register of Historic Places in 2006.

== See also ==
- National Register of Historic Places listings in Westchester County, New York
