= Port Amherst, West Virginia =

- Unincorporated community
- Location within West Virginia Location within the United States
- Coordinates: 38°18′35″N 81°33′24″W
- Country: United States
- State: West Virginia
- County: Kanawha
- Elevation: 607 ft (185 m)
- Time zone: UTC-5 (Eastern (EST))
  - Summer (DST): UTC-4 (EDT)
- Area codes: 304 & 681
- GNIS feature ID: 1545156

Port Amherst is an unincorporated community in Kanawha County, West Virginia, United States. Port Amherst is located on the Kanawha River southeast of Charleston. It is the northern terminus of the West Virginia Turnpike and is also served by U.S. Route 60. It was also known as Reed.
