= Kanawha County, West Virginia =

County in West Virginia, United States

- County
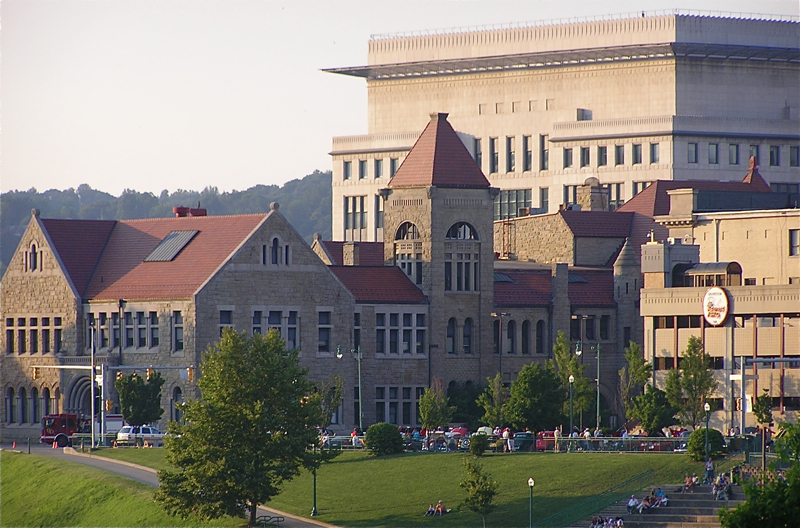
- Kanawha County Courthouse in Charleston

- Flag Seal

- Location within the U.S. state of West Virginia
- Coordinates: 38°20′N 81°32′W
- Country: United States
- State: West Virginia
- Founded: October 5, 1789
- Named for: Kanawha River
- Seat: Charleston
- Largest city: Charleston

Area
  - Total: 911 sq mi (2,360 km^{2})
  - Land: 902 sq mi (2,340 km^{2})
  - Water: 9.3 sq mi (24 km^{2}) 1.0%

Population (2020)
  - Total: 180,745
  - Estimate (2025): 172,381 ▼
  - Density: 200/sq mi (77.4/km^{2})
- Time zone: UTC−5 (Eastern)
  - Summer (DST): UTC−4 (EDT)
- Congressional district: 1st
- Website: www.kanawha.us

Kanawha County (/kəˈnɔːə/, kə-NAW-ə) is a county in the U.S. state of West Virginia. As of the 2020 census, the population was 180,745, making it West Virginia's most populous county. The county seat is Charleston, which is also the state capital and most populous city. Kanawha County is part of the Charleston, WV Metropolitan Statistical Area.

== History ==
The word Kanawha (pronounced "Ka-NAH-wah"), Ka(h)nawha, derives from the region's Iroquoian dialects, meaning "water way" or "Canoe Way", implying the metaphor "transport way". Kanawha County was named in honor of the Kanawha River that runs through the county. The spelling varied at the time from Conoys to Conois to Kanawha. The phrase has been a matter of register. A two-story jail was the first county structure to be built, with the first floor dug into the bank of the Kanawha River.

The county began taking shape on November 14, 1788, under the authorization of the Virginia General Assembly, and was founded on October 5, 1789. The county was named for the Kanawha River. During the American Civil War, a number of state infantry and cavalry regiments were organized in the county for both Confederate Army and Union Army service.

In 1863, West Virginia's counties were divided into civil townships, with the intention of encouraging local government. This proved impractical in the heavily rural state, and in 1872 the townships were converted into magisterial districts. Kanawha County was divided into ten districts: Big Sandy, Cabin Creek, Charleston, Elk, Jefferson, Loudon, Malden, Poca, (Note: Originally "Pocatalico".) Union, and Washington. In the 1970s, the historic districts were consolidated into five new magisterial districts: District 1, District 2, District 3, District 4, and District 5. A District 6 was created in the 1980s, but in the 1990s the county was redistricted again, reducing the number of magisterial districts to four: District 1, District 2, District 3, and District 4.

Kanawha County was the site of a bloody miners' strike in 1912, and a school textbook controversy in 1974, that resulted in bombings, and received national attention.

== Geography ==
According to the United States Census Bureau, the county has a total area of 911 square miles (2,360 km^{2}), of which 902 square miles (2,340 km^{2}) is land and 9.3 square miles (24 km^{2}) (1.0%) is water. It is the fourth-largest county in West Virginia by area.

=== Adjacent counties ===
- Roane County (north)
- Clay County (northeast)
- Nicholas County (east)
- Fayette County (east)
- Raleigh County (southeast)
- Boone County (south)
- Lincoln County (southwest)
- Putnam County (west)
- Jackson County (northwest)

=== Major highways ===
- Interstate 64
- Interstate 77
- Interstate 79
- U.S. Route 60
- U.S. Route 119
- West Virginia Route 4
- West Virginia Route 25
- West Virginia Route 34
- West Virginia Route 61
- West Virginia Route 62
- West Virginia Route 94
- West Virginia Route 114
- West Virginia Route 214
- West Virginia Route 501
- West Virginia Route 601
- West Virginia Route 622
- West Virginia Route 817

== Demographics ==
Historical population
Census	Pop.	Note	%±
1800	3,239		—
1810	3,866		19.4%
1820	6,399		65.5%
1830	9,326		45.7%
1840	13,567		45.5%
1850	15,353		13.2%
1860	16,150		5.2%
1870	22,349		38.4%
1880	32,466		45.3%
1890	42,756		31.7%
1900	54,696		27.9%
1910	81,457		48.9%
1920	119,650		46.9%
1930	157,667		31.8%
1940	195,619		24.1%
1950	239,629		22.5%
1960	252,925		5.5%
1970	229,515		−9.3%
1980	231,414		0.8%
1990	207,619		−10.3%
2000	200,073		−3.6%
2010	193,063		−3.5%
2020	180,745		−6.4%
2025 (est.)	172,381	▼	−4.6%
U.S. Decennial Census; 1790–1960 1900–1990; 1990–2000 2010–2020

=== 2020 census ===
As of the 2020 census, the county had a population of 180,745. Of the residents, 19.6% were under the age of 18 and 21.4% were 65 years of age or older; the median age was 44.1 years. For every 100 females there were 93.2 males, and for every 100 females age 18 and over there were 90.8 males.

There were 79,365 households in the county, of which 25.0% had children under the age of 18 living with them and 31.7% had a female householder with no spouse or partner present. About 34.2% of all households were made up of individuals and 15.0% had someone living alone who was 65 years of age or older.

There were 90,294 housing units, of which 12.1% were vacant. Among occupied housing units, 67.7% were owner-occupied and 32.3% were renter-occupied. The homeowner vacancy rate was 2.5% and the rental vacancy rate was 11.1%.

The racial makeup of the county was 85.0% White, 7.5% Black or African American, 0.2% American Indian and Alaska Native, 1.2% Asian, 0.7% from some other race, and 5.3% from two or more races. Hispanic or Latino residents of any race comprised 1.5% of the population.

The average household and family size was 2.89.

The median income for a household was $56,112 and the poverty rate was 15.8%

Kanawha County, West Virginia – Racial and ethnic composition Note: the US Census treats Hispanic/Latino as an ethnic category. This table excludes Latinos from the racial categories and assigns them to a separate category. Hispanics/Latinos may be of any race.
Race / Ethnicity (NH = Non-Hispanic)	Pop 2000	Pop 2010	Pop 2020	% 2000	% 2010	% 2020
White alone (NH)	180,258	170,969	152,735	90.09%	88.55%	84.50%
Black or African American alone (NH)	13,870	13,950	13,416	6.93%	7.22%	7.42%
Native American or Alaska Native alone (NH)	401	388	357	0.20%	0.20%	0.19%
Asian alone (NH)	1,687	1,982	2,138	0.84%	1.02%	1.18%
Pacific Islander alone (NH)	34	37	47	0.01%	0.01%	0.02%
Other race alone (NH)	205	207	733	0.10%	0.10%	0.40%
Mixed race or Multiracial (NH)	2,446	3,718	8,599	1.22%	1.92%	4.75%
Hispanic or Latino (any race)	1,172	1,812	2,720	0.58%	0.93%	1.50%
Total	200,073	193,063	180,745	100.00%	100.00%	100.00%

=== 2010 census ===
As of the 2010 United States census, there were 193,063 people, 84,201 households, and 52,172 families living in the county. The population density was 214.1 inhabitants per square mile (82.7/km^{2}). There were 92,618 housing units at an average density of 102.7 units per square mile (39.7 units/km^{2}). The racial makeup of the county was 89.1% white, 7.3% black or African American, 1.0% Asian, 0.2% American Indian, 0.3% from other races, and 2.0% from two or more races. Those of Hispanic or Latino origin made up 0.9% of the population. In terms of ancestry, 14.8% were German, 14.2% were Irish, 13.9% were English, and 13.4% were American.

Of the 84,201 households, 27.1% had children under the age of 18 living with them, 44.3% were married couples living together, 13.1% had a female householder with no husband present, 38.0% were non-families, and 32.5% of all households were made up of individuals. The average household size was 2.26 and the average family size was 2.84. The median age was 42.4 years.

The median income for a household in the county was $42,669 and the median income for a family was $54,203. Males had a median income of $42,522 versus $31,754 for females. The per capita income for the county was $25,439. About 9.7% of families and 13.7% of the population were below the poverty line, including 20.5% of those under age 18 and 8.3% of those age 65 or over.

=== 2000 census ===
As of the census of 2000, there were 200,073 people, 86,226 households, and 55,960 families living in the county. The population density was 222 people per square mile (86 people/km^{2}). There were 93,788 housing units at an average density of 104 units per square mile (40 units/km^{2}). The racial makeup of the county was 90.46% White, 6.97% Black or African American, 0.21% Native American, 0.85% Asian, 0.02% Pacific Islander, 0.21% from other races, and 1.27% from two or more races. 0.59% of the population were Hispanics or Latinos of any race.

There were 86,226 households, out of which 26.50% had children under the age of 18 living with them, 49.00% were married couples living together, 12.30% had a female householder with no husband present, and 35.10% were non-families. 30.80% of all households were made up of individuals, and 12.50% had someone living alone who was 65 years of age or older. The average household size was 2.28 and the average family size was 2.84.

The age distribution was 21.30% under the age of 18, 8.40% from 18 to 24, 28.10% from 25 to 44, 25.60% from 45 to 64, and 16.50% who were 65 years of age or older. The median age was 40 years. For every 100 females, there were 90.70 males. For every 100 females age 18 and over, there were 87.10 males.

The median income for a household in the county was $33,766, and the median income for a family was $42,568. Males had a median income of $33,842 versus $24,188 for females. The per capita income for the county was $20,354. About 11.20% of families and 14.40% of the population were below the poverty line, including 20.60% of those under age 18 and 10.50% of those age 65 or over.

== Politics ==
Kanawha County was dominated by the Democratic Party for much of the 20th century, albeit to a lesser extent than much of West Virginia. Since 2004 it has been won by Republicans in presidential elections, although, as an urban county, the swing to the Republicans has not been as vast as in much of the rest of the state. The county seat and state capital of Charleston was once heavily Democratic, but now leans Republican as a whole.

United States presidential election results for Kanawha County, West Virginia
Year	Republican		Democratic		Third party(ies)	
Year	No.	%	No.	%	No.	%
1880	2,112	34.66%	2,378	39.02%	1,604	26.32%
1884	4,240	58.99%	2,820	39.23%	128	1.78%
1888	4,541	54.66%	3,089	37.19%	677	8.15%
1892	5,078	51.17%	4,549	45.84%	296	2.98%
1896	6,948	58.65%	4,824	40.72%	75	0.63%
1900	7,249	60.17%	4,736	39.31%	63	0.52%
1904	8,857	58.62%	5,756	38.10%	495	3.28%
1908	9,663	54.43%	7,117	40.09%	974	5.49%
1912	1,780	9.96%	6,658	37.26%	9,431	52.78%
1916	10,096	48.14%	10,276	49.00%	598	2.85%
1920	23,781	54.33%	19,284	44.06%	704	1.61%
1924	26,018	49.14%	22,726	42.92%	4,207	7.95%
1928	35,788	58.16%	25,563	41.54%	184	0.30%
1932	35,455	47.39%	38,617	51.61%	749	1.00%
1936	35,387	41.00%	50,801	58.86%	113	0.13%
1940	40,113	40.91%	57,932	59.09%	0	0.00%
1944	36,488	43.50%	47,400	56.50%	0	0.00%
1948	41,144	43.45%	53,213	56.19%	338	0.36%
1952	56,861	51.04%	54,540	48.96%	0	0.00%
1956	58,597	53.81%	50,289	46.19%	0	0.00%
1960	57,130	51.19%	54,484	48.81%	0	0.00%
1964	38,383	35.25%	70,511	64.75%	0	0.00%
1968	41,712	41.76%	46,650	46.70%	11,524	11.54%
1972	65,021	63.09%	38,032	36.91%	0	0.00%
1976	42,213	44.06%	53,602	55.94%	0	0.00%
1980	42,604	46.43%	42,829	46.68%	6,327	6.90%
1984	51,499	57.51%	37,832	42.25%	211	0.24%
1988	38,140	47.95%	41,144	51.73%	258	0.32%
1992	31,358	38.40%	38,315	46.91%	11,998	14.69%
1996	29,311	38.32%	40,357	52.76%	6,827	8.92%
2000	36,809	48.01%	38,524	50.25%	1,337	1.74%
2004	44,430	50.53%	43,010	48.92%	488	0.55%
2008	40,952	49.65%	40,594	49.22%	934	1.13%
2012	41,364	55.10%	32,480	43.26%	1,233	1.64%
2016	43,850	57.03%	28,263	36.76%	4,775	6.21%
2020	46,398	56.41%	34,344	41.76%	1,508	1.83%
2024	43,352	57.62%	30,231	40.18%	1,656	2.20%

=== Elected officials ===
Agency	Elected Official
Kanawha County Commission	Commissioner Ben Salango, President; Commissioner Natalie Tennant; Commissioner Lance Wheeler
Kanawha County Assessor	Sallie Robinson
Kanawha County Circuit Clerk	Cathy Gatson
Kanawha County Clerk	Vera McCormick
Kanawha County Prosecutor	Charles "Chuck" Miller
Kanawha County Sheriff	Michael Y. Rutherford

== Economy ==
According to the 2010 U.S. Census, there are approximately 5,481 private sector businesses within Kanawha County. There are 89,768 people who are currently employed who live in Kanawha County.

== Recreation ==
Parks	Golf
Coonskin Park	Coonskin Golf Course
Shawnee Park	Shawnee Golf Course
Meadowood Park	Edgewood Country Club
Pioneer Park	Little Creek Golf Course
Wallace Hartman Nature Preserve	Sleepy Hollow Golf Club
Cato Park	Sandy Brae Golf Course
Ridenour Park	Berry Hills Country Club
Big Bend Park	Big Bend Golf Course
Kanawha State Forest	
Saint Albans City Park	

== Events ==
- FestivALL
- Charleston Sternwheel Regatta (Returning 2022)
- Live on the Levee
- Vandalia Gathering
- Rib Fest
- Charleston Rod Run Doo Wop
- Majorette Festival - Daily Mail Kanawha County Majorette and Band Festival
- Pinch Reunion
- St. Albans Festival of Lights

== Attractions ==
- Clay Center (West Virginia)
- West Virginia State Capitol
- West Virginia Cultural Center
- South Charleston Mound
- Mardi Gras Casino and Resort
- Charleston Civic Center
- Heritage Tower Museum

== Sports ==
- Charleston Dirty Birds - Baseball team
- West Virginia United - Soccer club

== Communities ==
=== Cities ===
- Charleston (county seat)
- Dunbar
- Marmet
- Montgomery (part)
- Nitro (part)
- Smithers (part)
- South Charleston
- St. Albans

=== Towns ===
- Belle
- Cedar Grove
- Chesapeake
- Clendenin
- East Bank
- Glasgow
- Handley
- Pratt

=== Magisterial districts ===
- District 1
- District 2
- District 3
- District 4

=== Census-designated places ===
- Alum Creek (part)
- Big Chimney
- Chelyan
- Coal Fork
- Cross Lanes
- Dupont City
- Elkview
- Eskdale
- Hollygrove
- Institute
- Jefferson
- Malden
- Pinch
- Rand
- Shrewsbury
- Sissonville
- Tornado
- West Dunbar

=== Unincorporated communities ===
- Aarons
- Acme
- Acup
- Airport Village
- Amandaville
- Amelia
- Annfred
- Arborland Acres
- Barren Creek
- Blackhawk
- Blakeley
- Blount
- Blue Creek
- Blundon
- Bream
- Brounland
- Burnwell
- Cabin Creek
- Carbon
- Cinco
- Coalburg
- Coalridge
- Coco
- Corton
- Crede
- Crown Hill
- Davis Creek
- Dawes
- Decota
- Dial
- Diamond
- Dickinson
- Donwood
- Dry Branch
- Dungriff
- East Nitro
- East Side
- Edgewood
- Elk
- Elk Forest
- Elk Hills
- Emmons (part)
- Etowah
- Falling Rock
- Ferrell
- Fivemile
- Forest Hills
- Forks of Coal
- Fort Hill
- Frame
- Gallagher
- Giles
- Green Valley
- Greencastle
- Grippe
- Guthrie
- Hansford
- Hernshaw
- Hicumbottom
- Highlawn
- Hillsdale
- Hitop
- Holly
- Hollyhurst
- Hugheston
- Island Branch
- Ivydale
- Jarrett
- Jarretts Ford
- Joplin
- Kanawha Estates
- Kayford
- Kelly Hill
- Kendalia
- Laing
- Leewood
- Loudendale
- Lower Falls
- Mammoth
- Meadowbrook
- Mink Shoals
- Ohley
- Pocatalico
- Pond Gap
- Port Amherst
- Putney
- Quick
- Quincy
- River Bend
- Rocky Fork
- Rock Lake Village
- Rutledge
- Sanderson
- Sharon
- Tyler Heights
- Tyler Mountain

== Notable people ==
- Robert Alexander, NFL football player
- Anthony Bass, NFL football player
- George Crumb, composer
- Aaron Dobson, Super Bowl champion football player
- Ryan Dorsey, actor
- Jon Elmore, NBA basketball player
- Conchata Ferrell, actress best known for her role as Berta on Two and a Half Men
- Jennifer Garner, actress and Golden Globe and SAG award winner
- Elizabeth Harden Gilmore, business leader and civil rights advocate
- Gary Gregor, NBA basketball player
- Alex Hawkins, two-time NFL champion football player
- Alexis Hornbuckle, two-time WNBA champion basketball player
- T. D. Jakes, megachurch pastor
- Carl Lee, NFL football player
- Earl Lloyd, Basketball Hall of Fame inductee and the first African-American basketball player to play in an NBA game
- Kathy Mattea, country music and bluegrass singer
- Ann Magnuson is an American actress, performance artist, and nightclub performer.
- Renee Montgomery, two-time WNBA champion basketball player
- Randy Moss, Pro Football Hall of Fame inductee and holder of the NFL record for receiving touchdowns in a season
- Lou Myers, actor, best known for his role as Vernon Gaines on A Different World
- Les Palmer, NFL champion football player
- Phil Pfister, strongman competitor and winner of the 2006 World's Strongest Man competition
- Kristen Ruhlin, actress
- Ryan Switzer, NFL football player
- Booker T. Washington, highly influential educator, author, orator, presidential advisor, and co-founder of the Tuskegee Institute
- Jerry West, Basketball Hall of Fame inductee and the basis for the silhouette on the NBA logo since 1971
- Jason Williams, NBA basketball player

== See also ==
- Kanawha County Schools
- National Register of Historic Places listings in Kanawha County, West Virginia
- Kanawha County textbook controversy
