= National Register of Historic Places listings in Macoupin County, Illinois =

Location of Macoupin County in Illinois

This is a list of the National Register of Historic Places listings in Macoupin County, Illinois.

This is intended to be a complete list of the properties and districts on the National Register of Historic Places in Macoupin County, Illinois, United States. Latitude and longitude coordinates are provided for many National Register properties and districts; these locations may be seen together in a map.

There are 8 properties and districts listed on the National Register in the county.

This National Park Service list is complete through NPS recent listings posted March 21, 2025.

== Current listings ==
	Name on the Register	Image	Date listed	Location	City or town	Description
1	John C. Anderson House	John C. Anderson House	November 5, 1992 (#92001535)	920 W. Breckenridge St. 39°17′28″N 89°53′11″W	Carlinville	
2	Carlinville Chapter House	Carlinville Chapter House	November 28, 1980 (#80001385)	111 S. Charles St. 39°17′52″N 89°52′32″W	Carlinville	
3	Carlinville Historic District	Carlinville Historic District	May 17, 1976 (#76000721)	Roughly bounded by Oak, Mulberry, Morgan, and the eastern city limits 39°16′46″N 89°52′17″W	Carlinville	
4	J. L. Robinson General Store	J. L. Robinson General Store	September 12, 1980 (#80001386)	Off Illinois Route 108; 39°18′32″N 90°04′44″W	Hagaman	
5	Route 66, Girard to Nilwood	Route 66, Girard to Nilwood	May 23, 2002 (#99000117)	U.S. Route 66, between Illinois Route 4 south of Girard and Illinois Route 4; 39°24′45″N 89°47′16″W	Nilwood	
6	Shriver Farmstead		September 29, 1980 (#80001387)	Northwest of Virden; 39°31′20″N 89°48′47″W	Virden	
7	Soulsby Service Station	Soulsby Service Station	May 6, 2004 (#04000420)	102 South Route 66 St. 39°04′23″N 89°44′08″W	Mount Olive	
8	Union Miners Cemetery	Union Miners Cemetery	October 18, 1972 (#72000463)	0.5 miles north of the Mount Olive city park 39°04′52″N 89°43′53″W	Mount Olive	

== See also ==
- List of National Historic Landmarks in Illinois
- National Register of Historic Places listings in Illinois
