= Bill Blizzard =

American labor leader

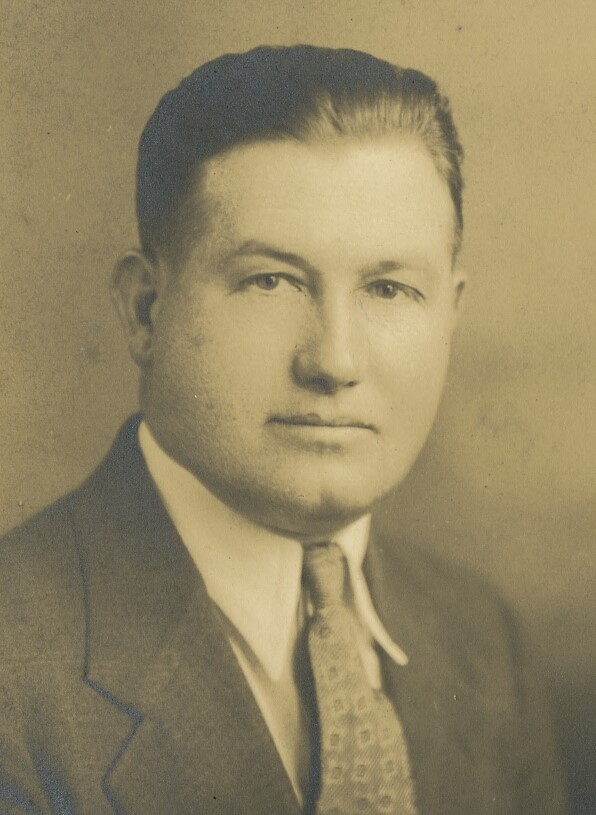
- Blizzard c. 1920s
- Born: William H. Blizzard; September 19, 1892; Cabin Creek, West Virginia, U.S.
- Died: July 31, 1958 (aged 65); Charleston, West Virginia, U.S.
- Known for: Battle of Blair Mountain

William H. Blizzard (September 19, 1892 – July 31, 1958) was an American union organizer, a commander of the miners' army during the Battle of Blair Mountain, and president of District 17 of the United Mine Workers (UMWA). Blizzard is most remembered for his role in the Battle of Blair Mountain, leading the miners against the forces of Logan County sheriff Don Chafin. For his leadership role in the battle, Blizzard was charged with treason, but was acquitted at his trial on these charges. From that time forward, he remained an important leader within the UMWA and organized labor.

== Early life ==
Blizzard was born on September 19, 1892, in Cabin Creek, West Virginia. He was born to his parents Timothy Blizzard and Sarah H. Blizzard. His father, Timothy, was a coal miner and his mother, Sarah, was a strong supporter of the UMWA. Sarah has been compared to Mother Jones and is also known as “Ma,” and Bill would be referred to as “Ma’s son.” At the age of ten, Bill became a coal miner and worked alongside his father. He soon would become a loyal member of the UMWA. Bill was cocky and self-confident and his family's loyalty to the UMWA was very strong, for this reason at the age of ten Bill and his family would be evicted from their home. After a tent camp was set up for evicted miners it was shot up by armed guards and it was rumored Bill's mother tore up part of the railroad in an attempt to halt the shooting of tent camps. Bill was 18 or 19 at the time his mother tried to destroy the railroad and defend tent camps full of miners. At the age of 16 Bill was already a seasoned coal miner, and it has been stated “Bill would fight at the drop of the hat and sometimes you didn’t need the hat.” By 19 Bill was already a local leader of the UMWA, and a fiercely loyal member. He would quickly go on to rise through the ranks of the UMWA.

== Career in UMWA ==
At ten years old Bill Blizzard was evicted from his home along with other miners for being strong supporters of the UMWA. This mainly happened because of the loyalty showed by his parents to the union. His sister would describe the eviction as “biscuits and taters thrown out and coal shoveled out of the stove.” This would have a profound impact upon the young Bill Blizzard and he later became an outspoken asset to the UMWA. In 1912-1913 the Paint Creek–Cabin Creek strike broke out. The UMWA came to support the miners during the strike. The coal operators sent armed mine guards, who were their own private police force, to break the striking miners. This led Blizzard's mother, Sarah Blizzard, to try to pry up the railroad tracks to prevent the armed mine guards from committing more shootings. Douglas Estep draws this conclusion about West Virginia, “it is an industrial police state where all roads and train depots were patrolled by armed guards…to defy the guards or to even hint at union sympathy was to invite a beating, exile, or even death." During the Paint Creek/Cabin Creek Strike armed mine guards were sent to West Virginia with the main objective of getting the UMWA out of the state and to keep them out. The guards would evict miners that were loyal to the union or that were striking, literally throwing their belongings out on to the street and sometimes beating them and in some instances, killing the miners. Their main objective was to intimidate union sympathizers. The UMWA during this time started to be plagued by corruption, especially the union officials. The miners became discontented with the corruption, seeing it as damaging to the fight for miners' rights. Eventually in elections held by the UMWA they would vote out the corrupt officials and would elect Frank Keeney, Fred Mooney, and Bill Blizzard. Blizzard was 19 years old when he got elected.

Bill Blizzard was very persuasive and at times created a lot of controversy. With the leadership of Bill Blizzard, along with Frank Keeney and Fred Mooney, and the intercession of Governor Hatfield, the miners and the UMWA temporarily prevailed to the extent that the coal operators at least acknowledged the union and listened to the UMWA's demands. While Blizzard was one of the key members of the UMWA district 17 in Charleston, WV, he was not an advocate of peaceful agreements. Miners liked his enthusiasm and many became strong supporters of Blizzard.

== Battle of Blair Mountain ==
Before the Battle of Blair Mountain tensions between coal operators and coal miners were at a boiling point. The Paint Creek/Cabin Creek strike and the Battle of Matewan are two examples of hostilities during the Mine Wars. After Albert Sidney Hatfield or “Sid Hatfield” was gunned down on the courthouse steps by Baldwin Felts agents on August 1, 1921, conflict was inevitable, Sid was a hero for his part in the Battle of Matewan. Miners would turn to Bill Blizzard for leadership. In recent years it has been discovered Bill Blizzard was the miners General during the Battle of Blair Mountain. Frank Keeney and Fred Mooney were charged with murder halfway through the battle and fled to Ohio. The miners proceeded to assemble just below the city of Charleston and had gathered plenty of guns, ammunition, and supplies. The ensuing march became known as the “Armed March,” starting at Charleston and ending in Logan County where they encountered Don Chafin and his forces. The miners' strength is estimated at about 10,000 men. Bill Blizzard was an organizer of the armed march and played a key role in supplying guns, ammunition, and supplies to the army. Mother Jones, a well-known advocate of the UMWA labor movement, tried to halt the miners before they entered Logan County. She claimed she had a letter from then President Warren G. Harding that supported many of the rights the miners were fighting for. This letter turned out to be fake and the word quickly spread. Mother Jones left West Virginia shortly after the presentation of the false letter. The miners wore red bandanas around their necks to distinguish friend from foe, and contributed to the term of "redneck". The miners reached Logan County at Blair Mountain and Crooked Creek gap, where Chafin had entrenched 2,000 non-union supporters and volunteers, determined that Mingo and Logan would keep the UMWA out. Each army used an identifying code word. The two opposing forces met in the woods and gave their code words, but neither heard the right reply and started shooting. These were the first casualties of the Battle of Blair Mountain. Blizzard's union forces and Chafin's non-union forces began a week long battle. Estimates of casualties vary among historians: according to some historians, there were 16 killed and an unidentified number wounded. The battle ended when President Harding sent federal troops to restore order. On August 31, 1921, Charles F. Thompson was part of the contingent of troops that attempted to restore order. He testified at Blizzard's May 1922 trial that he had been disregarded after he read the president's proclamation demanding an end to violence, after which he communicated to his superiors that troops were needed. The plan to restore order by dispatching troops worked because the miners refused to fight against soldiers many had fought alongside during World War I. When Blizzard was asked if he was the leader of the army he replied "What army, I guess the boys will listen to me alright."

== Later life and death ==
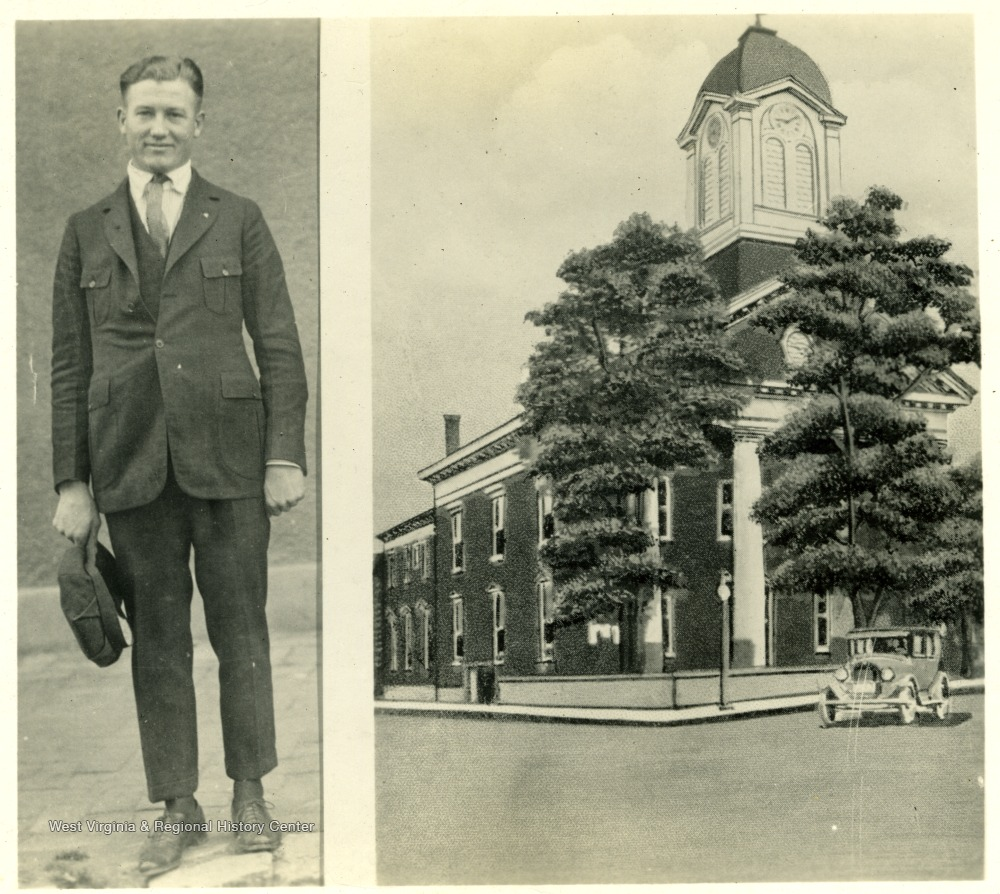
Blizzard and the Jefferson County Courthouse, where he was tried, c. 1922

After the Battle of Blair Mountain (Blizzard was considered the miners' general and leader) Blizzard was charged with treason against the state, but was acquitted. The coal operators capitalized on this opportunity to crush the union in West Virginia. UMWA leader John Lewis, who had opposed the Battle of Blair Mountain, expelled Blizzard from the union. Blizzard continued to fight for miners' rights. In 1933, in the wake of the New Deal, the UMWA was re-organized and re-invented. John Lewis gave Blizzard his job back, and in turn Blizzard was back preaching across the state as a UMWA member once again. Coal miners in West Virginia genuinely trusted Blizzard and some considered him a hero. Blizzard would eventually become president of the district 17 of the UMWA. Blizzard also became a strong opponent of the West Virginia Miners Union, created by ousted UMWA members Frank Keeney and Bill Mooney. Tension between John Lewis and Bill Blizzard continued, coming to a head when Blizzard got into a fist fight with John Lewis’ younger brother. This led to John Lewis ousting Blizzard from the UMWA in 1955. After this incident Blizzard was relieved of his duties as President of the UMWA district 17. He never forgave John Lewis for this and it is said he regretted being involved with John Lewis. Bill Blizzard retired to a farm in Putnam County in 1955. He died three years later on July 31, 1958. He was 65 years old.
