= Sarah Blizzard (labor activist) =

American labor leader (1864–1955)

- Born: Sarah Rebecca Rogers; October 6, 1864; Edmond, West Virginia, US
- Died: September 28, 1955 (aged 90); West Virginia, US
- Known for: UMWA supporter
- Spouse: Timothy Blizzard
- Children: Bill Blizzard

Sarah Rebecca Blizzard (née Rogers; October 6, 1864 – September 28, 1955) was an American labor activist involved with the United Mine Workers of America (UMWA). She was the mother of UMWA officer Bill Blizzard, and was known to the coal miners as "Mother" or "Ma" Blizzard. UMWA President Cecil Roberts is her great-grandson.

== Background ==
Born in Fayette County, West Virginia, Sarah witnessed the arrival of the railroads circa 1880 and the beginnings of the coal mining industry in southern West Virginia. Blizzard was involved with the United Mine Workers of America (UMWA) from its beginnings and encouraged her family to participate with the union. Women were not allowed in the mines, but focused on running their households and raising their families. They held a key role in supporting the men in the mines and when they went on strike.

The Blizzard family was evicted from their home in Kilsyth, West Virginia due to Sarah's support of the miners in the coal strike of 1902. After their eviction, the family moved to Cabin Creek, West Virginia. During the Paint Creek–Cabin Creek strike of 1912, Blizzard allowed striking miners to camp on her family's land. Ma Blizzard and Mother Jones organized an "umbrella march" where pro-union women marched with umbrellas in support of the miners. Blizzard led a group of women to damage the railroad tracks used by the Bull Moose Special, "train-riding, machine-gunning lawmen" who shot into tent colonies used by miners and their families evicted by the coal companies for striking.

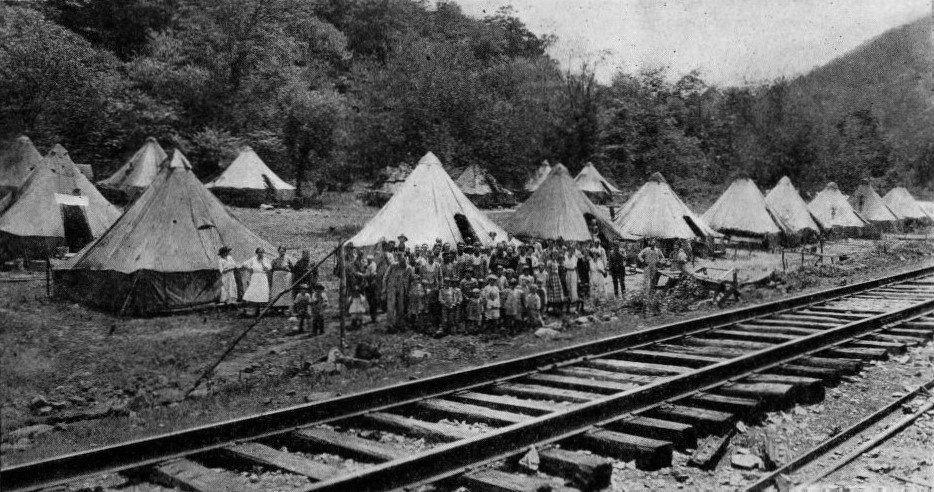
Holly Grove tent colony houses evicted miner families during the strike.(Potentially later in 1922)

After the 1912 strike, Blizzard was called to testify before the Congressional committee investigating the conditions which led to the strike. One aspect of her testimony was the actions of the guards towards the community during the strike. Ma Blizzard never left her community, but in the following years focused her energy on supporting the work of the miners.
