= Shriver (disambiguation) =

Shriver is a surname.

Shriver may also refer to:

- Shriver Center, Ohio
- Shriver Covered Bridge, Pennsylvania
- Shriver Farmstead, Illinois
- Shriver House, Illinois
- Shriver (film), an upcoming comedy film starring Michael Shannon
