= Cecil Roberts (labor unionist) =

American labor leader (born 1946)

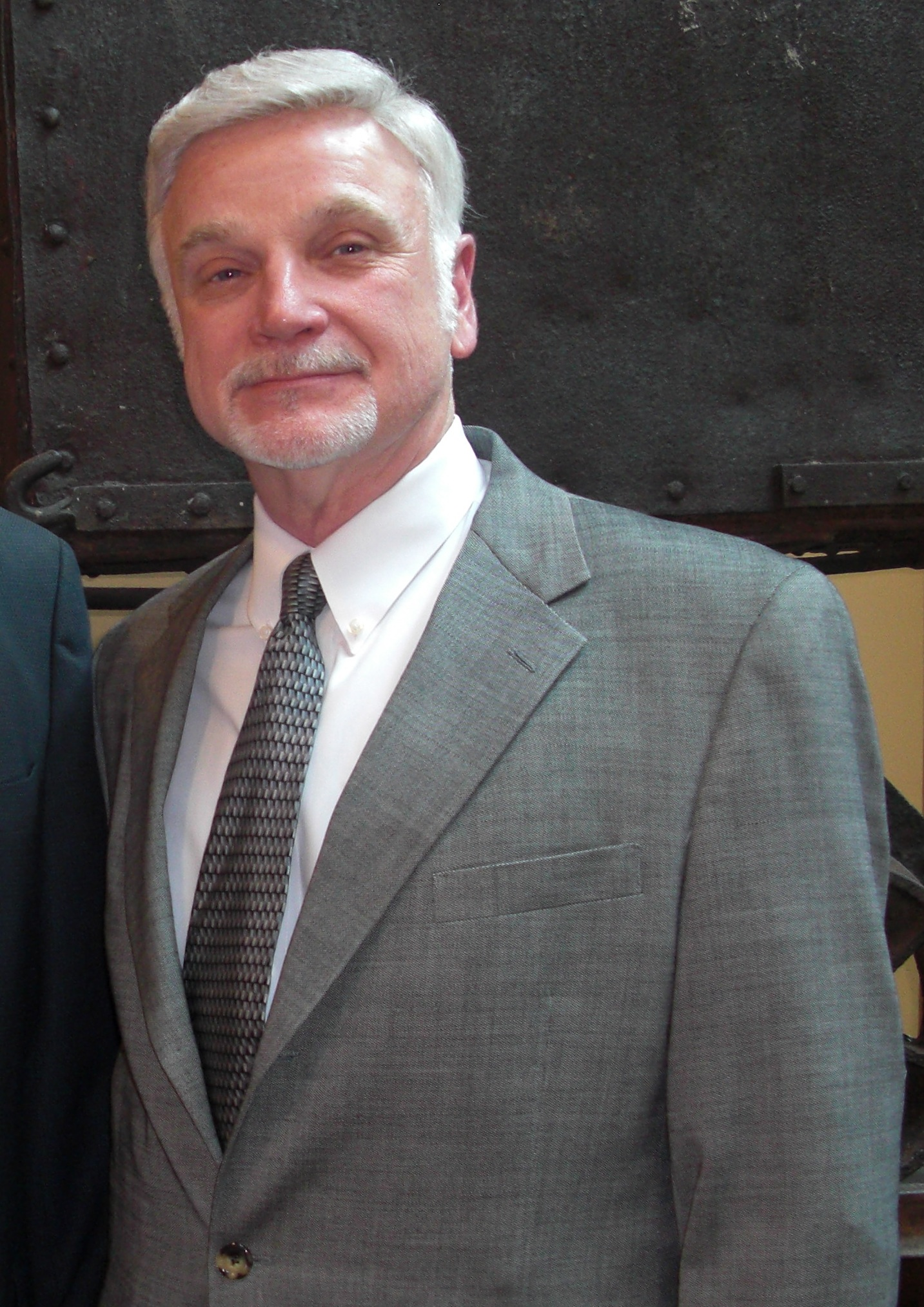
- Roberts in 2009

15th President of the United Mine Workers
- Incumbent
- Assumed office October 22, 1995
- Preceded by: Richard Trumka

Personal details
- Born: October 31, 1946 (age 80) Kanawha County, West Virginia, U.S.
- Education: West Virginia University Institute of Technology
- Occupation: Miner; Labor leader
- Known for: President, United Mine Workers of America

Cecil Roberts (born October 31, 1946) is a miner and president of the United Mine Workers of America (UMWA). He also sits on the AFL–CIO's executive council. Roberts is the great-grandson of Ma Blizzard.

== Early life ==
Roberts was born on Halloween in 1946. He grew up along Cabin Creek in Kanawha County, West Virginia.

Roberts enlisted in the United States Army and served with the 167th Light Infantry Brigade, Americal Division at Chu Lai during the Vietnam War in 1967–68. After leaving the Army, Roberts went to work as a miner in 1971. He became active in Miners for Democracy, the reform movement in the United Mine Workers which sprung up around miner Arnold Miller. In 1977, he was elected vice president of District 17.

In 1982, Roberts was elected vice president of UMWA. His running mate was Richard Trumka, who became the union's president.

Roberts graduated from the West Virginia Institute of Technology with a bachelor's degree in 1987 and received an honorary Doctorate in Humanities from West Virginia University of Technology in 1997.

In 1989, Roberts was the on-site leader and strategist and chief negotiator in UMWA's 10-month strike against Pittston Coal. For his role in that successful strike, Roberts received the Rainbow Coalition's Martin Luther King award as well as awards from Citizen Action and the Midwest Academy.

== Presidency of UMWA ==
When Trumka resigned the presidency of UMWA on December 22, 1995, after being elected secretary-treasurer of the AFL–CIO, Roberts assumed the presidency in his stead.

In 1996, Roberts won an agreement from coal mine operators to re-open UMWA's national coal agreement. It was the first time the contract had been re-opened in the union's history, and Roberts won substantial wage increases.

In 1997, Roberts was elected president of UMWA in his own right to a new five-year term. For the first time in UMWA history, the entire leadership team slate ran unopposed.

In 1998, Roberts negotiated a new national coal agreement.

In 2000, Roberts won re-election a second time. Although his term was not due to expire, delegates to UMWA's March 2000 convention approved a resolution to move the election up so balloting would not coincide with negotiations for a new bituminous coal contract. Again, Roberts and his slate ran unopposed.

In 2001, Roberts bargained a new, five-year national coal agreement. The new agreement included significant pension increases and "30-and-out" language that allowed miners with 30 years of service to retire with full benefits at any age.

In September 2003, Roberts called an International Special Convention to restructure UMWA. Delegates approved proposals to eliminate all International Vice President positions, and combine the International Executive Board Member, District President and District Secretary-Treasurer positions into one office called International District Vice President. Delegates also approved moving the 2005 presidential election up to 2004.

In 2004, Roberts was re-elected a third time as president of UMWA.

In December 2005, Roberts negotiated a new national coal agreement which contained the highest pay raises since 1974. Health benefits were maintained, and coal companies will increase contributions to the UMWA Pension Fund by more than $500 million.

In 2008, Roberts received the Eugene V. Debs Foundation Award.

Trade union offices
Preceded by Wilbert Killion	Vice-President of the United Mine Workers of America; 1982–1995	Succeeded by Post split?
Preceded by Richard Trumka	President of the United Mine Workers of America; 1995 -	Succeeded by Incumbent
