= Frank Keeney =

American miner and labor leader (1882–1970)

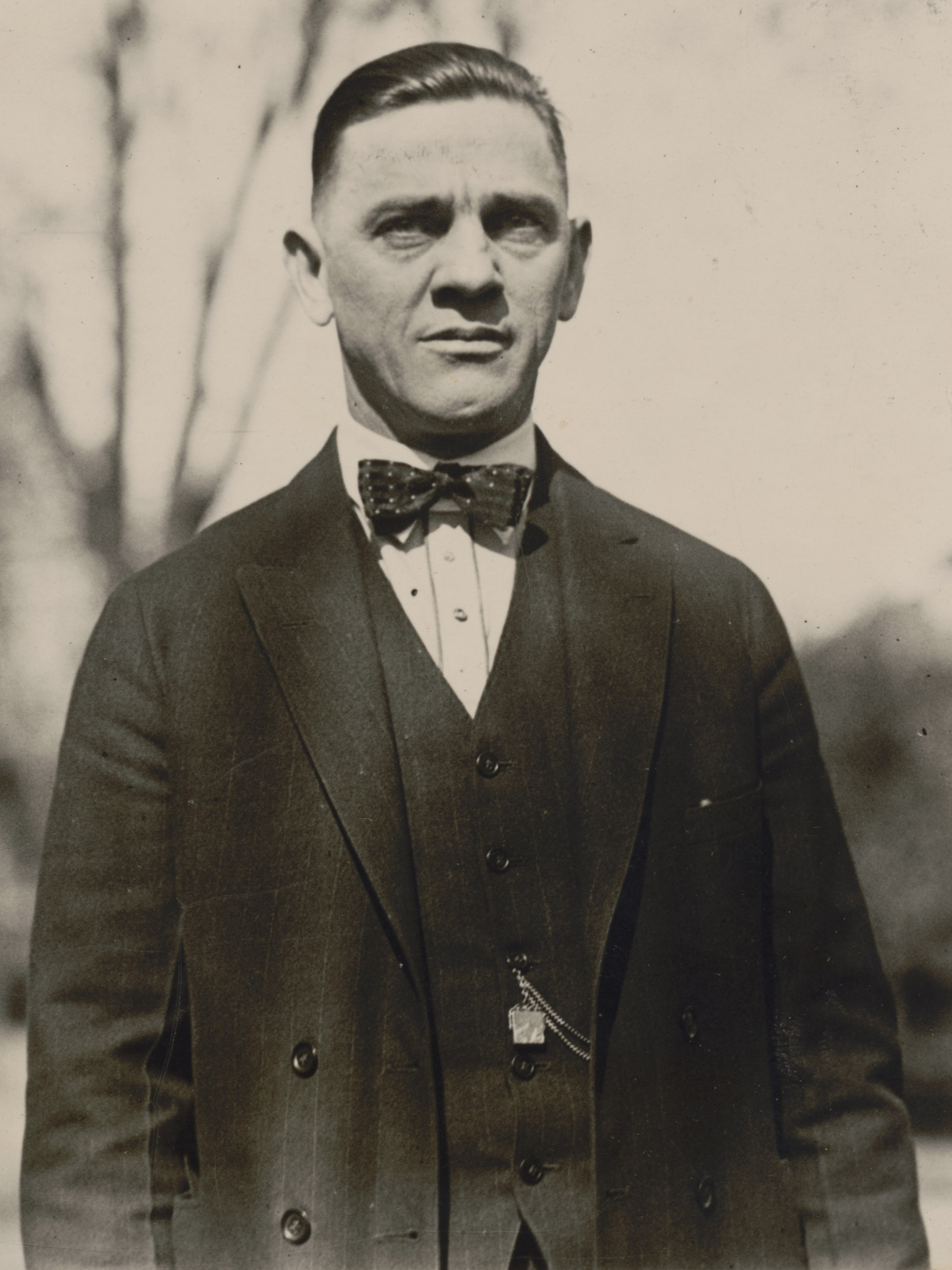
- Keeney in 1922
- Born: March 15, 1882; Cabin Creek, West Virginia, U.S.
- Died: May 22, 1970 (aged 88)
- Occupations: Miner, labor leader
- Known for: President, United Mine Workers of America, District 17

Charles Francis Keeney Jr. (March 15, 1882 – May 22, 1970) was a union organizer during the West Virginia Coal Wars. He served as a rank-and-file leader during the Paint Creek-Cabin Creek strike of 1912–13 and became president of United Mine Workers District 17 from his election in 1916 until 1924. He played a leadership role during the strike of 1920–21 leading up to the Battle of Blair Mountain.

== Early life ==
Frank Keeney was born in Cabin Creek, Kanawha, West Virginia. His father died when he was less than a year old.
