= Sarah Blizzard =

Sarah Blizzard may refer to:

- Sarah Blizzard (labor activist) (1864–1955), American labor activist
- Sarah Blizzard (bobsledder) (born 1996), Australian bobsledder
- Sara Blizzard (born 1970), British TV weather presenter
