= J. L. Robinson General Store =

- Robinson, J. L., General Store
- U.S. National Register of Historic Places
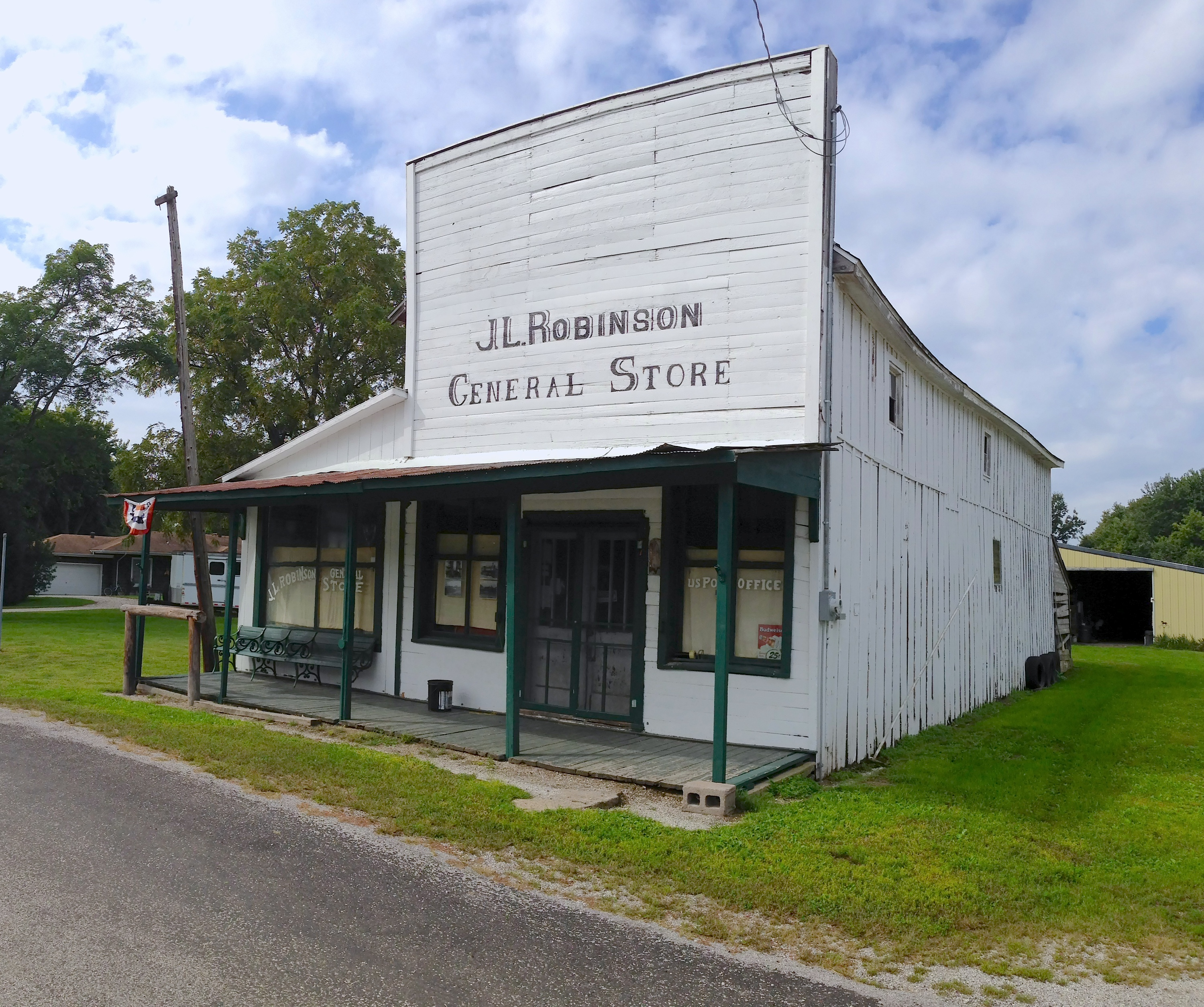

- Location within Illinois Location within the United States
- Location: Off IL 108, Hagaman, Illinois
- Coordinates: 39°18′32″N 90°04′44″W
- Area: less than one acre
- Built: 1881
- Built by: Robinson, Charles Crossland
- NRHP reference No.: 80001386
- Added to NRHP: September 12, 1980

The J. L. Robinson General Store is a historic general store located on Hagaman Road in Hagaman, Macoupin County, Illinois. Railroad worker Charles Crossland Robinson opened the store in 1881; his son James Leo Robinson took over the store upon his father's death, giving it its current name. The store was the primary supplier of household and farming supplies in Western Mound Township and the Hagaman and Chesterfield areas. In addition, the building served as the township's post office, a railway express office for Macoupin County's two railroads, and the local Democratic Party headquarters. The store was also the first building in the area to receive electricity and telephone service. It is now the only surviving building in the area built before 1900.

The building was added to the National Register of Historic Places on September 12, 1980.

== Gallery ==
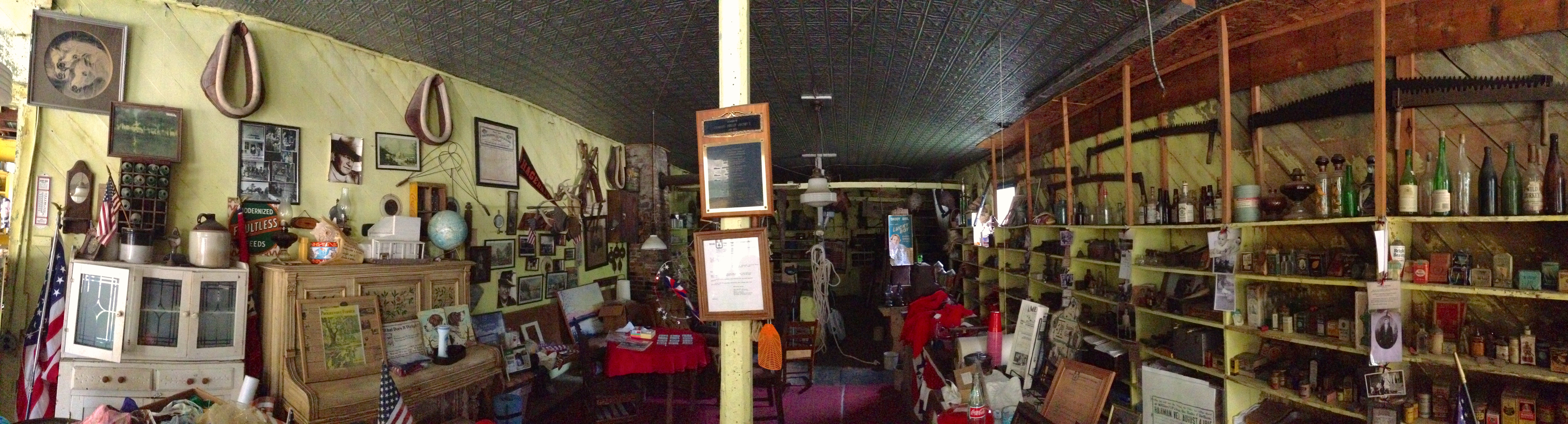
Panorama of the inside

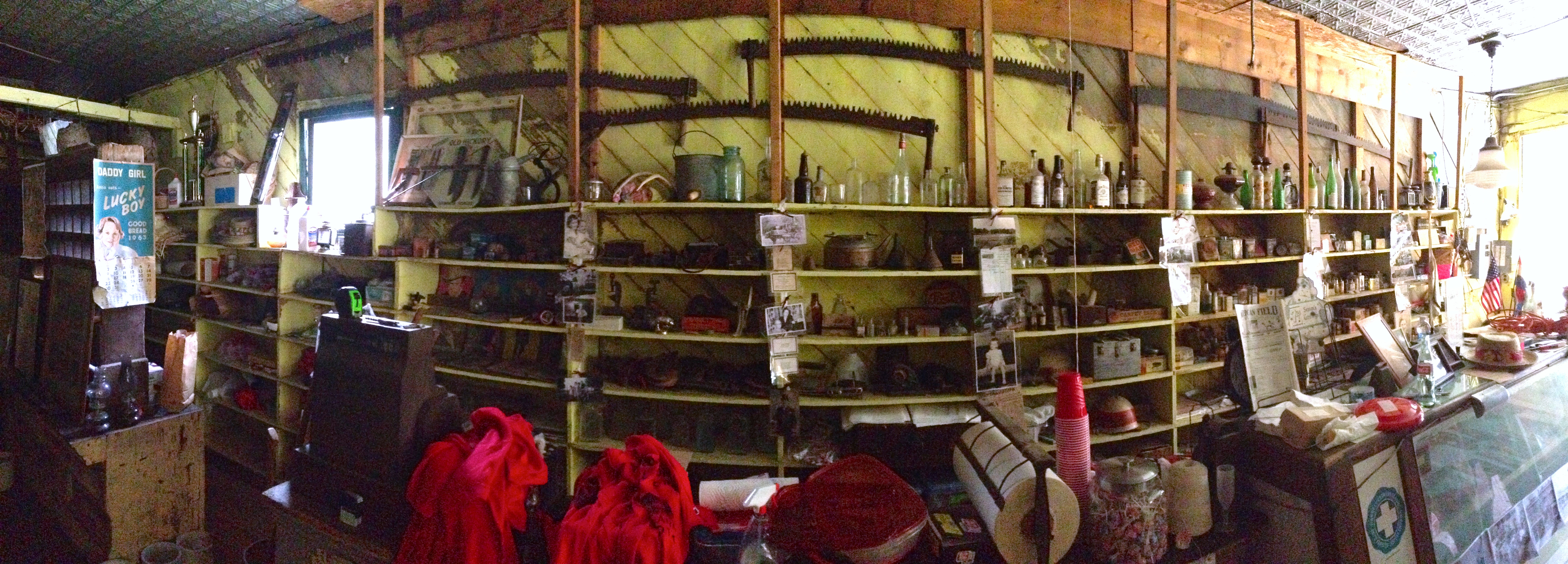
Panorama of the back counter and shelves
