= Jess Dobernic =

American baseball player (1917–1998)

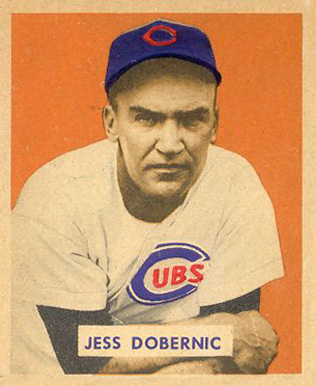
- Pitcher
- Born: November 20, 1917; Mount Olive, Illinois, U.S.
- Died: July 16, 1998 (aged 80); St. Louis, Missouri, U.S.
- Batted: Right Threw: Right

MLB debut
- July 2, 1939, for the Chicago White Sox

Last MLB appearance
- July 28, 1949, for the Cincinnati Reds

MLB statistics
- Win–loss record: 7–3
- Earned run average: 5.21
- Strikeouts: 55
- Stats at Baseball Reference

Teams
- Chicago White Sox (1939); Chicago Cubs (1948–1949); Cincinnati Reds (1949)

Andrew Joseph "Jess" Dobernic (November 20, 1917 – July 16, 1998) was an American professional baseball player. He was a right-handed pitcher over parts of three seasons (1939, 1948–49) with the Chicago White Sox, Chicago Cubs, and Cincinnati Reds. For his career, he compiled a 7–3 record, with a 5.21 earned run average, and 55 strikeouts in 109 innings pitched.

== Life and career ==
Dobernic was born in a Yugoslavian family in Mount Olive, Illinois. His first organized baseball was for Rayne, Louisiana in the Evangeline Baseball League in 1937. For the next four years, he was in the Chicago White Sox system including the St. Paul Saints, Waterloo Hawks and the major league team. But difficulty controlling his pitches largely kept him out of the major leagues.

During World War II, Dobernic spent three years in the United States Army Air Forces including Africa and Italy. He returned in the summer of 1945 and pitched for an Army team in Texas, winning 19 consecutive games despite his continued wild pitching.

Lee Grissom and Burgess Whitehead suggested changes in Dobernic's pitching style which helped, and his Los Angeles Angels manager Bill Sweeney made him a relief pitcher. In a 1945 game against the San Francisco Seals, he entered the game with the bases loaded and none out in the first inning and pitched nine innings while allowing no hits. In 1947, new Angels manager Bill Kelly credited him with saving 26 games and said the Angels would have finished in the second division rather than winning the Pacific Coast League championship. Excluding two poor games, he had a 2.93 earned run average in 1947.

Dobernic died in St. Louis, Missouri at the age of 80.
