= Mother Jones =

American labor organizer (1837–1930)

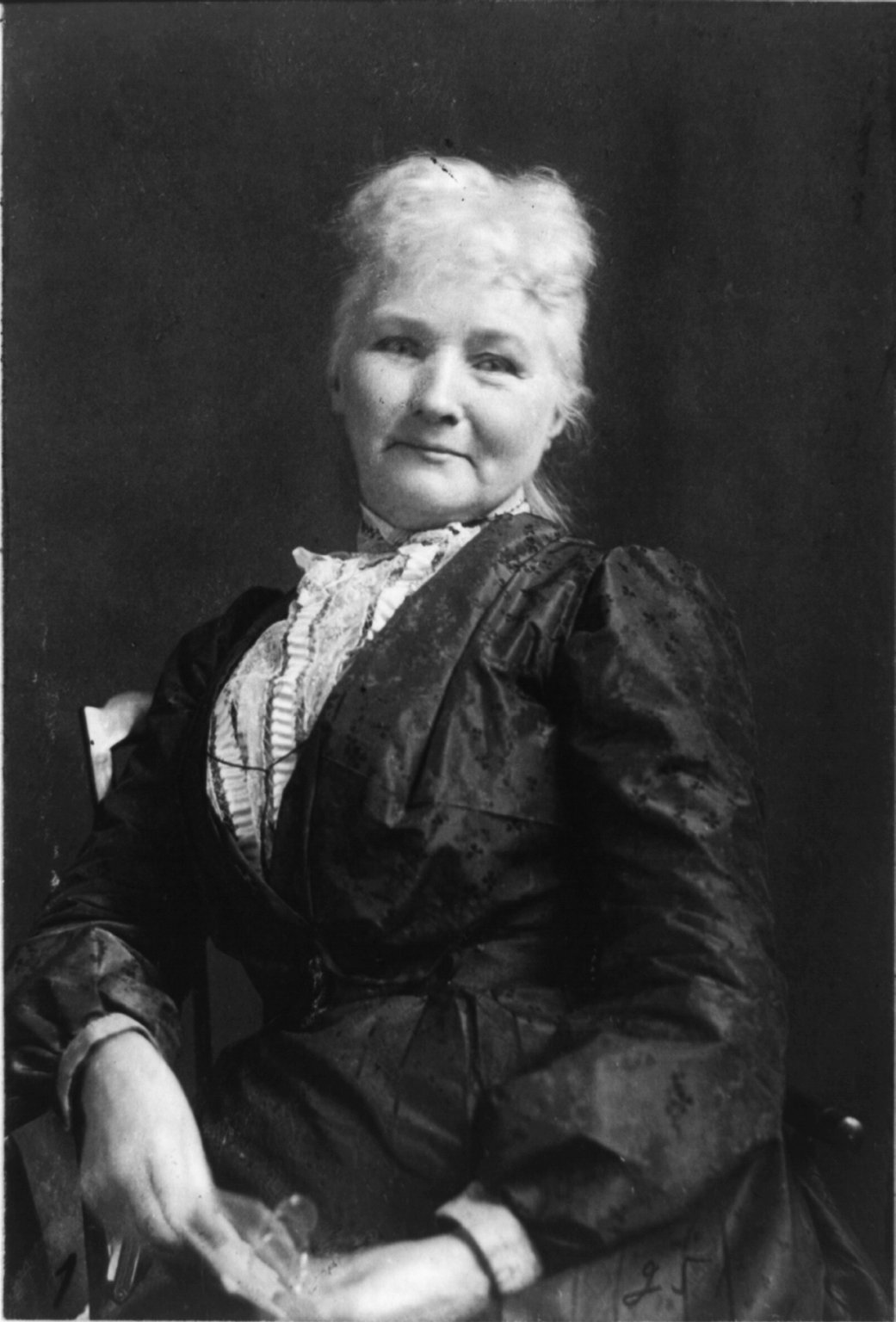
- Jones in 1902
- Born: Mary G. Harris; Cork, Ireland
- Baptized: August 1, 1837
- Died: November 30, 1930 (aged 93); Silver Spring, Maryland, U.S.
- Resting place: Union Miners Cemetery; Mount Olive, Illinois
- Occupations: Union organizer; community organizer; activist; schoolteacher; dressmaker
- Political party: Social Democratic (1898–1901); Socialist (from 1901)

Signature
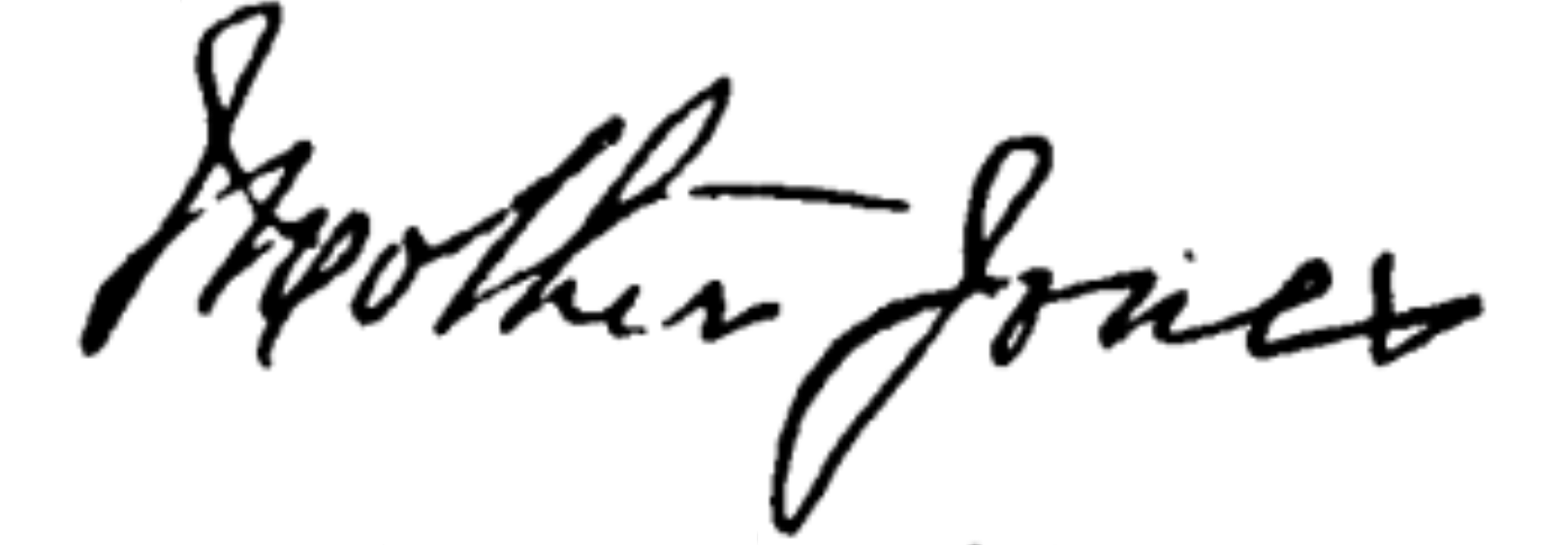

Mary G. Harris Jones (baptized August 1, 1837 – November 30, 1930), known as Mother Jones from 1897 onward, was an Irish-American labor organizer, schoolteacher, and dressmaker who became a prominent union organizer, community organizer, and activist. She helped coordinate major strikes, secure bans on child labor, and co-founded the trade union Industrial Workers of the World (IWW).

After Jones's husband and four children all died of yellow fever in 1867 and her dress shop was destroyed in the Great Chicago Fire of 1871, she became an organizer for the Knights of Labor and the United Mine Workers of America union. In 1902, she was called "the most dangerous woman in America" for her success in organizing miners and their families against the mine owners. In 1903, to protest the lax enforcement of the child labor laws in the Pennsylvania mines and silk mills, she organized a children's march from Philadelphia to the home of President Theodore Roosevelt in New York.

== Early life ==
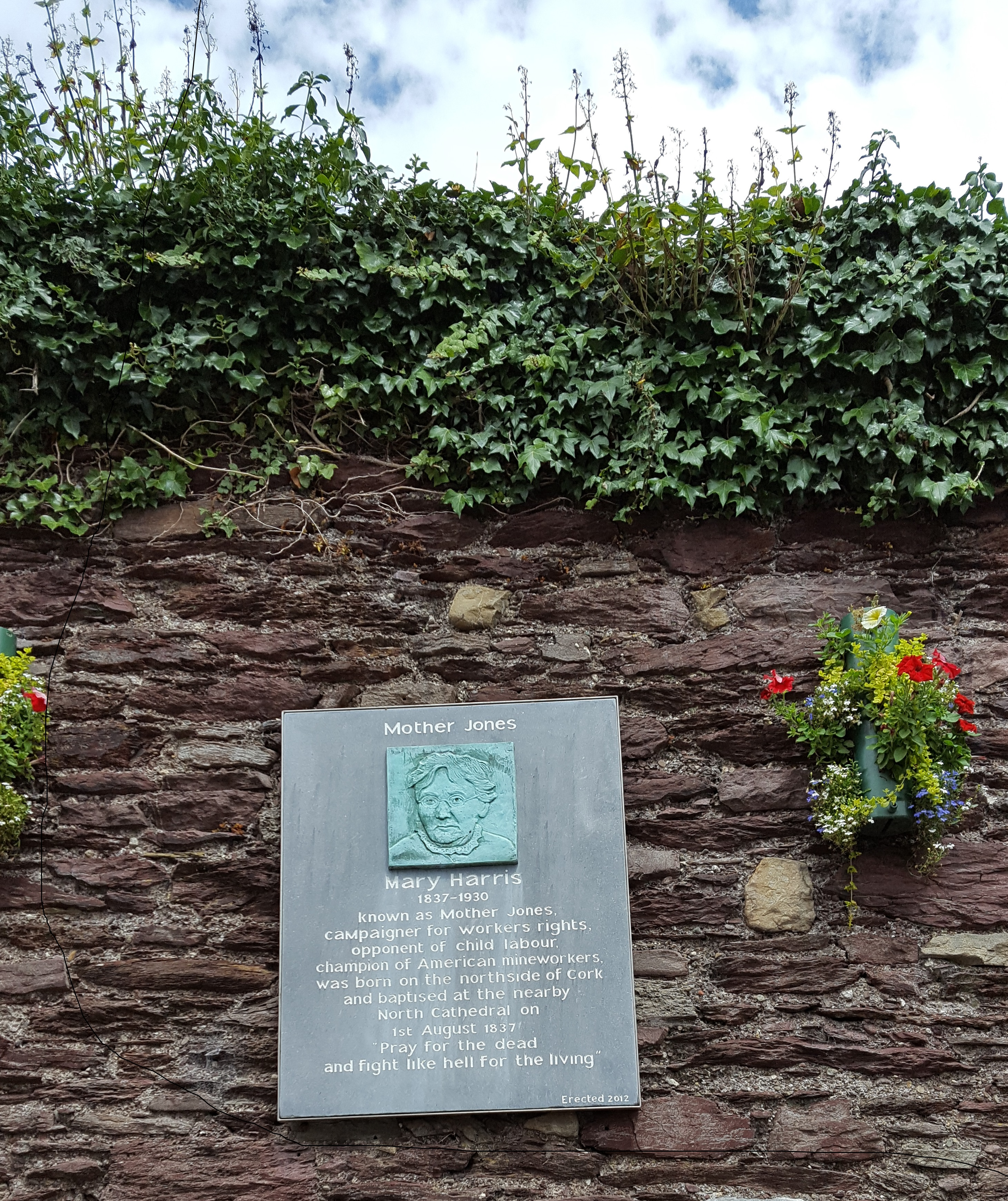
The Mother Jones Memorial near her birthplace

Mary G. Harris was born on the north side of Cork, the daughter of Catholic tenant farmers Richard Harris and Ellen (née Cotter) Harris. Her exact date of birth is uncertain; she was baptized on August 1, 1837. Harris and her family were victims of the Great Famine and were among the millions of Irish families driven to emigrate to North America. The family moved to Canada when Harris was 10.

== Formative years ==
Mary was a teenager when her family emigrated to Canada. In Canada (and later in the United States), the Harris family were victims of discrimination due to their immigrant status as well as their Catholic faith and Irish heritage. Mary received an education in Toronto at the Toronto Normal School, which was tuition-free and even paid a stipend to each student of one dollar per week for every semester completed. Mary did not graduate from the Toronto Normal School, but she was able to undergo enough training to take a teaching position at a convent in Monroe, Michigan, on August 31, 1859 at the age of 23. She was paid eight dollars per month, but the school was described as a "depressing place". After tiring of her assumed profession, she moved first to Chicago and then to Memphis, where in 1861 she married George E. Jones, a member and organizer of the National Union of Iron Moulders, which later became the International Molders and Foundry Workers Union of North America, which represented workers who specialized in building and repairing steam engines, mills, and other manufactured goods. Considering that Mary's husband was providing enough income to support the household, she altered her labor to housekeeping.

In 1867, Jones lost her husband and their four children, three girls and a boy all under the age of five, during a yellow fever epidemic in Memphis. After that loss, she returned to Chicago to open another dressmaking business. She did work for members of Chicago's upper class in the 1870s and 1880s. In 1871, four years after the death of her family, Jones lost her home, shop, and possessions in the Great Chicago Fire of 1871. Jones, like many others, helped rebuild the city. According to her autobiography, this led to her joining the Knights of Labor.

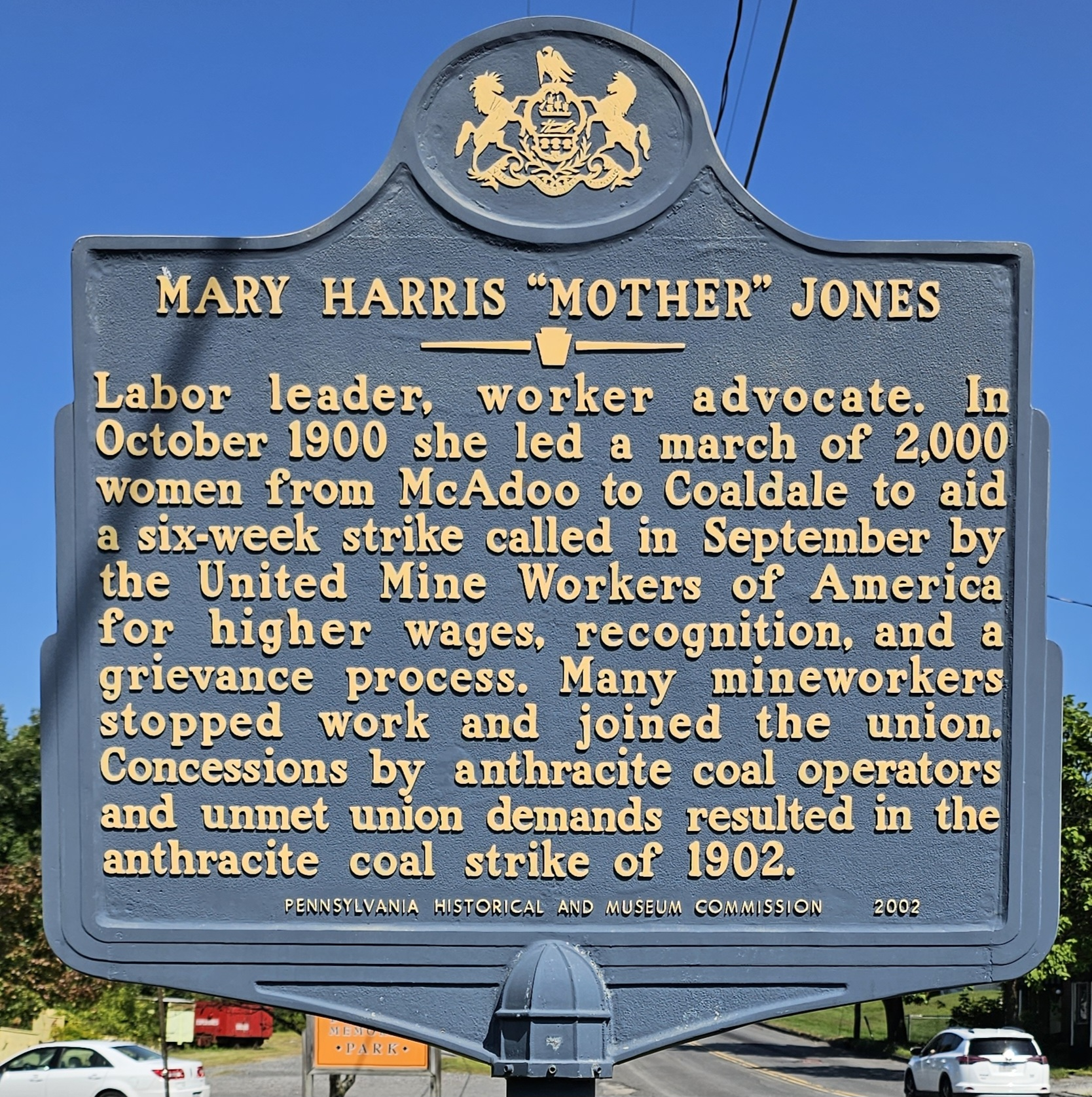
Pennsylvania state historical marker for Mother Jones in Coaldale, Schuylkill County

Jones started organizing strikes. At first the strikes and protests failed, sometimes ending with police shooting at and killing protesters. Most members of the Knights were men, and by the middle of the 1870s, member numbers leaped to more than a million, becoming the largest labor organization in the United States. The Haymarket Affair of 1886 and the fear of anarchism and social change incited by union organizations resulted in the demise of the Knights of Labor when an unknown person threw a bomb into an altercation between the Chicago police and workers on strike. Once the Knights ceased to exist, Mary Jones became involved mainly with the United Mine Workers (UMW). She frequently led UMW strikers in picketing and encouraged striking workers to stay on strike when management brought in strike-breakers and militias. She believed that "working men deserved a wage that would allow women to stay home to care for their kids." Around this time, strikes were getting better organized and started to produce greater results, such as better pay for the workers.

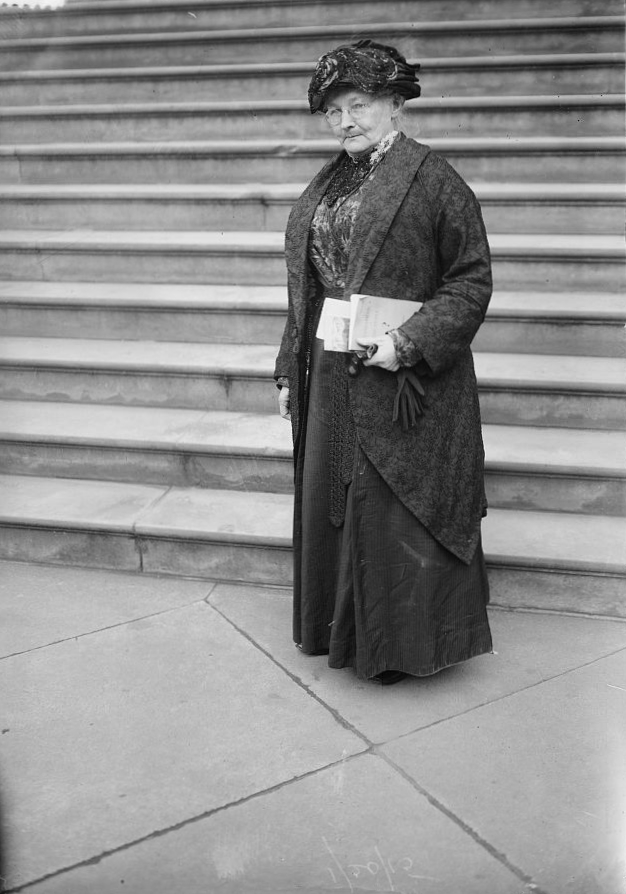
Jones at New York City Hall in 1915, where she was attending the hearings of the Federal Commission on Industrial Relations

Active as an organizer and educator in strikes nationwide, she was involved particularly with the UMW and the Socialist Party of America. As a union organizer, she gained prominence for organizing the wives and children of striking workers in demonstrations on their behalf. She was termed "the most dangerous woman in America" by a West Virginian district attorney, Reese Blizzard, in 1902 at her trial for ignoring an injunction banning meetings by striking miners. "There sits the most dangerous woman in America", announced Blizzard. "She comes into a state where peace and prosperity reign... crooks her finger, [and] twenty thousand contented men lay down their tools and walk out."

Jones was ideologically separated from many female activists of her day due to her lack of commitment to the cause of women's suffrage. She was quoted as saying that "you don't need the vote to raise hell!" She opposed many of the activists because she believed it was more important to advocate for the working class than to advocate for women. When some suffragists accused her of being anti-women's rights, she replied, "I'm not an anti to anything which brings freedom to my class."

Jones was known as a charismatic and effective speaker throughout her career. Occasionally she would include props, visual aids, and dramatic stunts in her speeches. Her talks usually involved the relating of some personal tale in which she invariably "showed up" one form of authority or another. Mother Jones reportedly spoke in a pleasant-sounding brogue that projected well. When she grew excited, her voice dropped in pitch.

By age 60, Jones had assumed the persona of "Mother Jones" by claiming to be older than she was, wearing outdated black dresses, and referring to the male workers that she helped as "her boys". The first reference to her in print as Mother Jones was in 1897.

== "March of the Mill Children" ==
In 1901, workers in Pennsylvania's silk mills went on strike. Many of them were young girls demanding to be paid adult wages. The 1900 census had revealed that one sixth of American children under the age of sixteen were employed. John Mitchell, the president of the UMWA, brought Mother Jones to Northeastern Pennsylvania in the months of February and September to encourage unity among striking workers. To do so, she encouraged the wives of the workers to organize into a group that would wield brooms, beat on tin pans, and shout "join the union!" She felt that wives had an important role to play as the nurturers and motivators of the striking men, but not as fellow workers. She claimed that the young girls working in the mills were being robbed and demoralized. She felt that the rich were denying these children the right to go to school in order to be able to pay for their own children's college tuitions.

To enforce worker solidarity, Jones traveled to the silk mills in New Jersey and returned to Pennsylvania to report that the conditions she observed there were much better. She stated that "the child labor law is better enforced for one thing and there are more men at work than seen in the mills here." In response to the strike, mill owners claimed that if the workers insisted on a wage scale, they would not be able to do business while paying adult wages and would be forced to close. Jones encouraged the workers to accept a settlement. Although she agreed to a settlement that sent the young girls back to the mills, she continued to fight child labor for the rest of her life.

In 1903, Jones organized children who were working in mills and mines to participate in her famous "March of the Mill Children", a 125-mile trek from Kensington, Philadelphia, to the summer house (and Summer White House) of President Theodore Roosevelt on Long Island (in Oyster Bay, New York). They had banners demanding "We want to go to school and not the mines!" and held rallies each night in a new town on the way with music, skits, and speeches drawing thousands of citizens.

As Mother Jones noted, many of the children at union headquarters were missing fingers and had other disabilities, and she attempted to get newspaper publicity for the bad conditions experienced by children working in Pennsylvania. However, the mill owners held stock in most newspapers. When the newspapermen informed her that they could not publish the facts about child labor because of this, she remarked "Well, I've got stock in these little children and I'll arrange a little publicity." Permission to see President Roosevelt was denied by his secretary, and it was suggested that Jones address a letter to the president requesting a visit with him. Mother Jones wrote a letter requesting a meeting, but never received an answer. Though the president refused to meet with the marchers, the incident brought the issue of child labor to the forefront of the public agenda.

== Activism and criminal charges ==
During the Paint Creek–Cabin Creek strike of 1912 in West Virginia, Mary Jones arrived in June 1912, speaking and organizing despite a shooting war between United Mine Workers members and the private army of the mine owners. Martial law in the area was declared and rescinded twice before Jones was arrested on February 13, 1913, and brought before a military court. Accused of conspiring to commit murder among other charges, she refused to recognize the legitimacy of her court-martial. She was sentenced to twenty years in the state penitentiary. During house arrest at Mrs. Carney's Boarding House, she acquired a dangerous case of pneumonia.

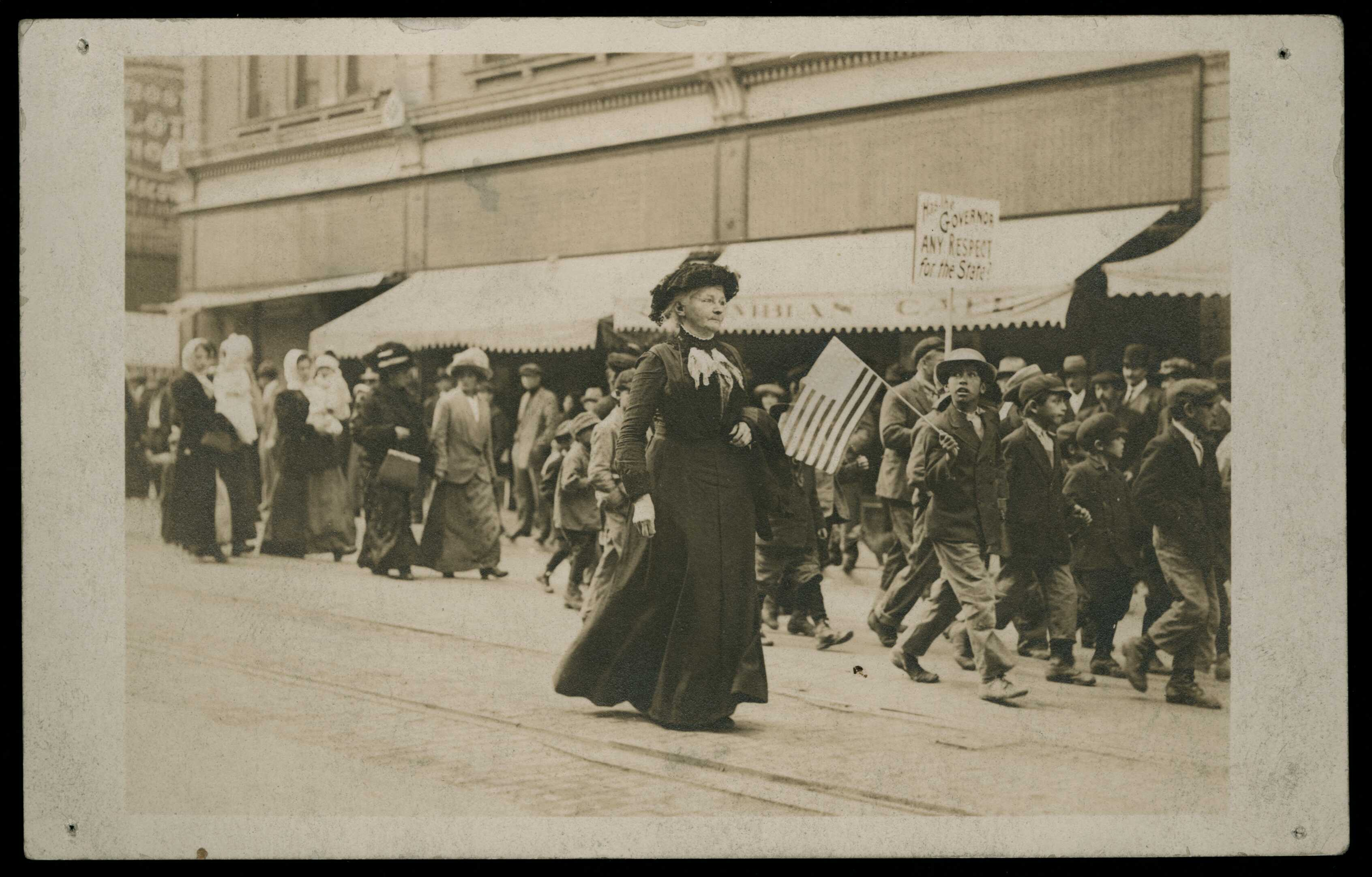
Mother Jones marching with workers in Trinidad, Colorado, 1913

Jones was released after 85 days of confinement, and her release coincided with Indiana Senator John W. Kern's initiation of a Senate investigation into the conditions in the local coal mines. Mary Lee Settle describes Jones at this time in her 1978 novel The Scapegoat. Several months later, she helped organize coal miners in Colorado in the 1913–14 United Mine Workers of America strike against the Rockefeller-owned Colorado Fuel and Iron company, in what is known as the Colorado Coalfield War. Once again she was arrested, serving time in prison and inside the San Rafael Hospital, and was escorted from the state in the months prior to the Ludlow Massacre. After the massacre, she was invited to meet with the owner of the Ludlow mine, John D. Rockefeller Jr. The meeting was partially responsible for Rockefeller's 1915 visit to the Colorado mines and introduction of long-sought reforms.

In 1917, Mother Jones played a role in the Bloomington Streetcar Strike.

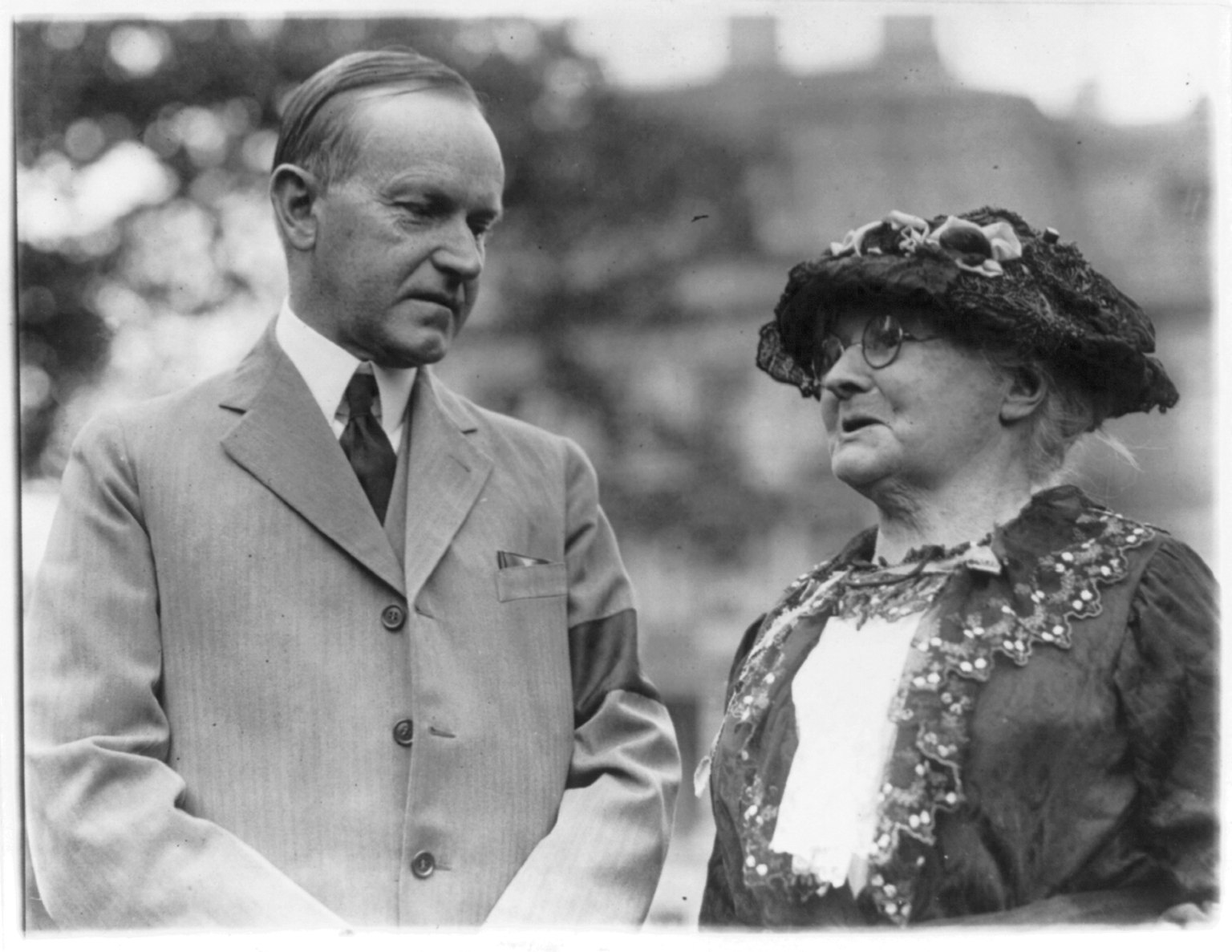
Jones with President Calvin Coolidge, 1924

Mother Jones attempted to stop miners from marching into Logan County, West Virginia, in late August 1921. Mother Jones also visited the governor and departed assured he would intervene. Jones opposed the armed march, appeared on the line of march and told them to go home. In her hand, she claimed to have a telegram from President Warren Harding offering to work to end the private police in West Virginia if they returned home. When UMW president Frank Keeney demanded to see the telegram, Mother Jones refused and he denounced her as a 'fake'. Because she refused to show anyone the telegram, and the President's secretary denied ever having sent one, she was suspected of having fabricated the story. After she fled the camp, she reportedly suffered a nervous breakdown.

Mother Jones was joined by Keeney and other UMWA officials who were also pressuring the miners to go home.

== Later years ==
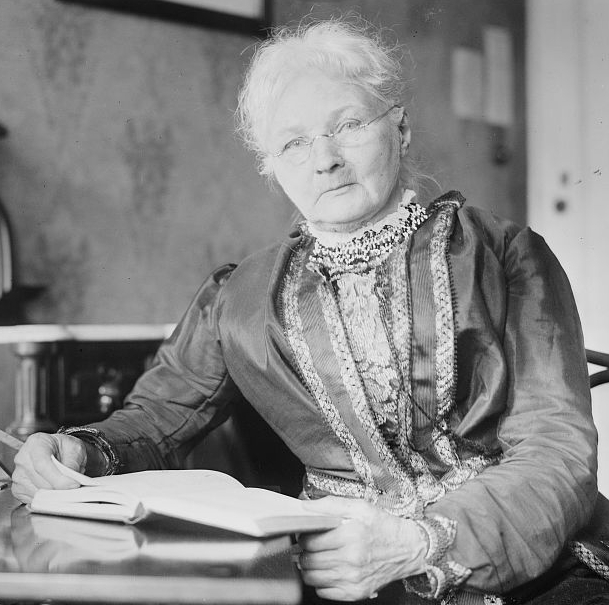
Jones was denounced on the floor of the U.S. Senate as the "grandmother of all agitators".

She remained a union organizer for the UMW into the 1920s and continued to speak on union affairs almost until she died. In 1923 she began writing an account of her life and experiences in the labor movement. Two years later, Charles H. Kerr & Co. published the manuscript as The Autobiography of Mother Jones. Although she had organized for decades on behalf of the UMWA in West Virginia, and even labeled the state "medieval", in her autobiography chapter titled "Medieval West Virginia", she mostly praises its Governor Ephraim F. Morgan for defending the First Amendment freedom to publish the weekly labor newspaper, The Federationist. His defiance of the mine owners' demand to ban the paper demonstrated to Jones that he "refused to comply with the requests of the dominant money interests. To a man of that type, I wish to pay my respects".

During her later years, Jones lived with her friends Walter and Lillie May Burgess on their farm in what is now Adelphi, Maryland. She celebrated her self-proclaimed 100th birthday there on May 1, 1930, and was filmed making a statement for a newsreel.

== Death ==
Mary Harris Jones died on November 30, 1930, at the Burgess farm, then in Silver Spring, Maryland, now part of Adelphi. There was a funeral Mass at St. Gabriel's Catholic Church in Washington, D.C.

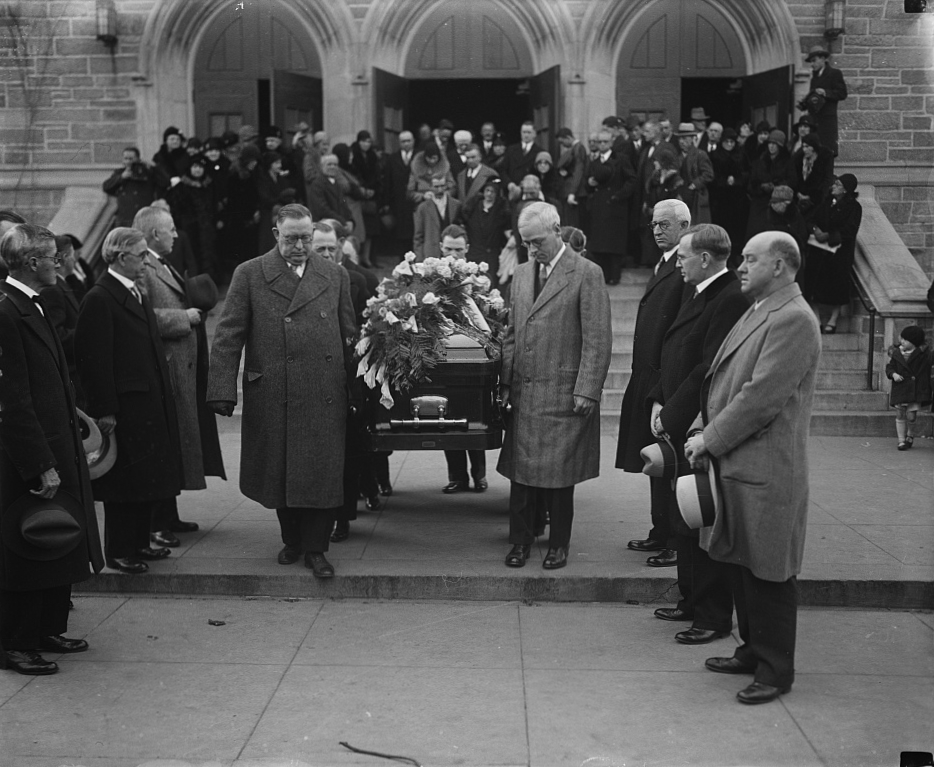
Funeral of Mother Jones, December 3, 1930

Jones is buried in the Union Miners Cemetery in Mount Olive, Illinois, alongside miners who died in the 1898 Battle of Virden. She called these miners, killed in strike-related violence, "her boys". In 1932, about 15,000 Illinois mine workers gathered in Mount Olive to protest against the United Mine Workers, which soon became the Progressive Mine Workers of America. Convinced that they had acted in the spirit of Mother Jones, the miners decided to place a proper headstone on her grave. By 1936, the miners had saved up more than $16,000 and were able to purchase "eighty tons of Minnesota pink granite, with bronze statues of two miners flanking a twenty-foot shaft featuring a bas-relief of Mother Jones at its center". On October 11, 1936, also known as Miners' Day, an estimated 50,000 people arrived at Mother Jones's grave to see the new gravestone and memorial. Since then, October 11 is not only known as Miners' Day but is also referred to and celebrated in Mount Olive as "Mother Jones's Day".

The farm where she died began to advertise itself as the "Mother Jones Rest Home" in 1932, before being sold to a Baptist church in 1956. The site is now marked with a Maryland Historical Trust marker, and a nearby elementary school is named in her honor.

== Legacy ==
In 1930, Mother Jones said the following regarding her legacy: "I am considered a Bolshevik, and a Red and an I.W.W., and a radical, and I admit to being all they've charged me with. I'm anything that would change monied civilization to a higher and grander civilization for the ages to come. And I long to see the day when labor will have the destination of the nation in her own hands, and she will stand a united force, and show the world what workers can do."

According to historian Otis K. Rice:

Her diminutive stature, white hair, pleasant face, and unpretentious dress bespoke a certain dignity. When she dwelt upon injustices suffered by labor or sought to spur workers to action, however, the venerable little lady tore loose in torrents of invective and profanity that both shocked and delighted her audiences. Her methods were no mere theatrics; they were the means of drawing to the surface the thoughts, feelings, and longings of laboring classes to which she was able to give eloquent expression. Her sincere concern for their hardships, deprivation, and sufferings engendered trust and in the long run contributed as much to her success as her rousing exhortations. When she died in 1930 at the age of one hundred, she was beloved by the working classes and admired by others for her candor and courage.

Mother Jones remained a well-known symbol for the American labor movement after her death and remains an important symbol for the power of organized labor among activists and organizers, both in the United States and globally.

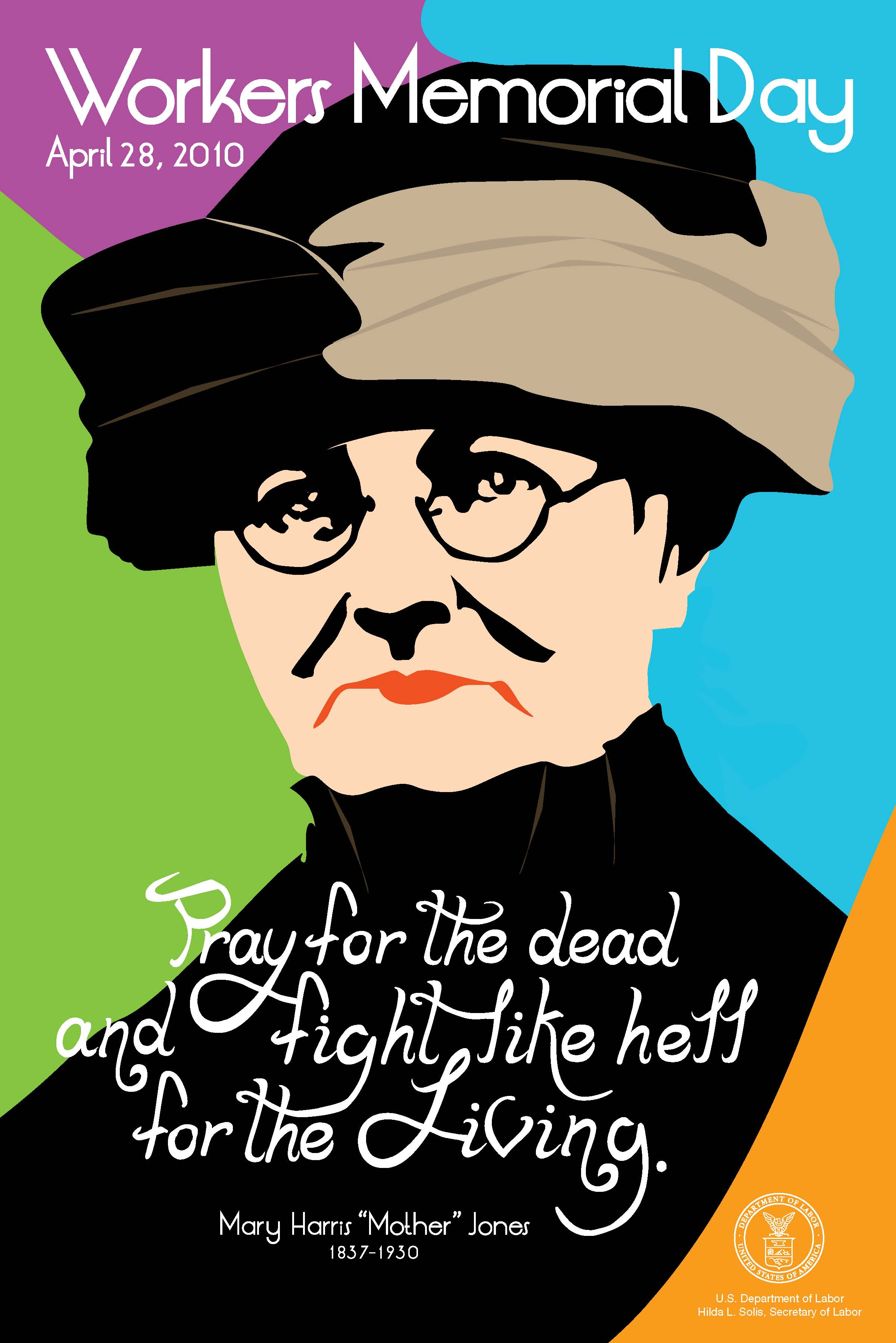
United States Department of Labor poster, 2010

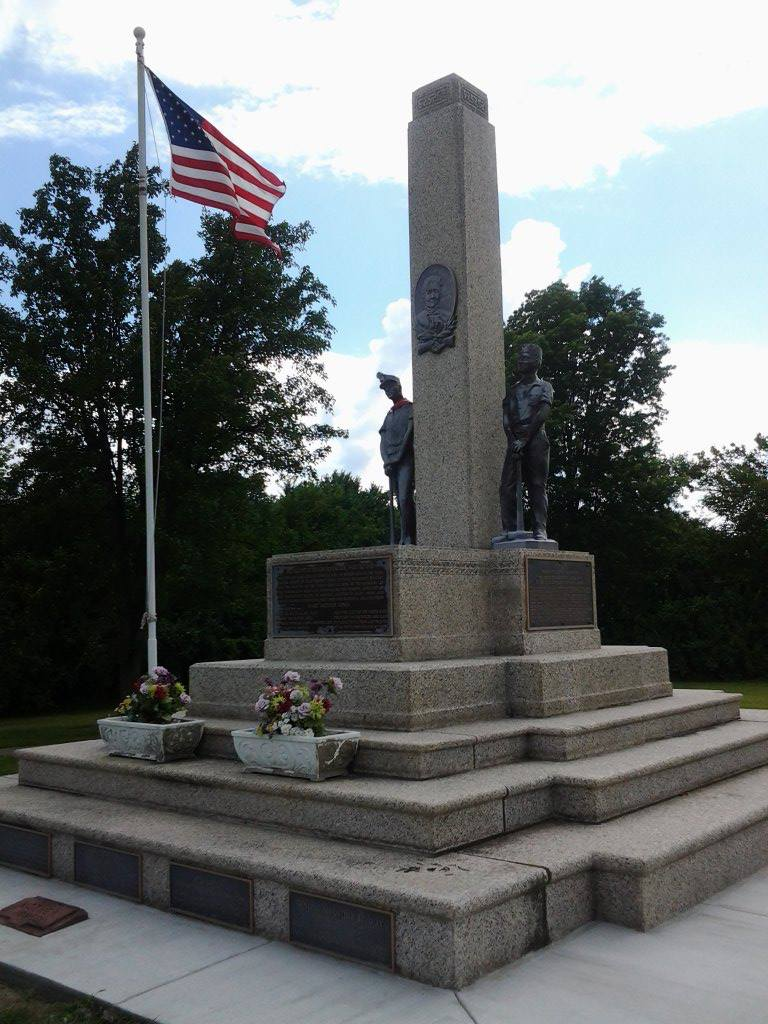
Mother Jones' burial site at the Union Miners Cemetery in Mount Olive, Illinois

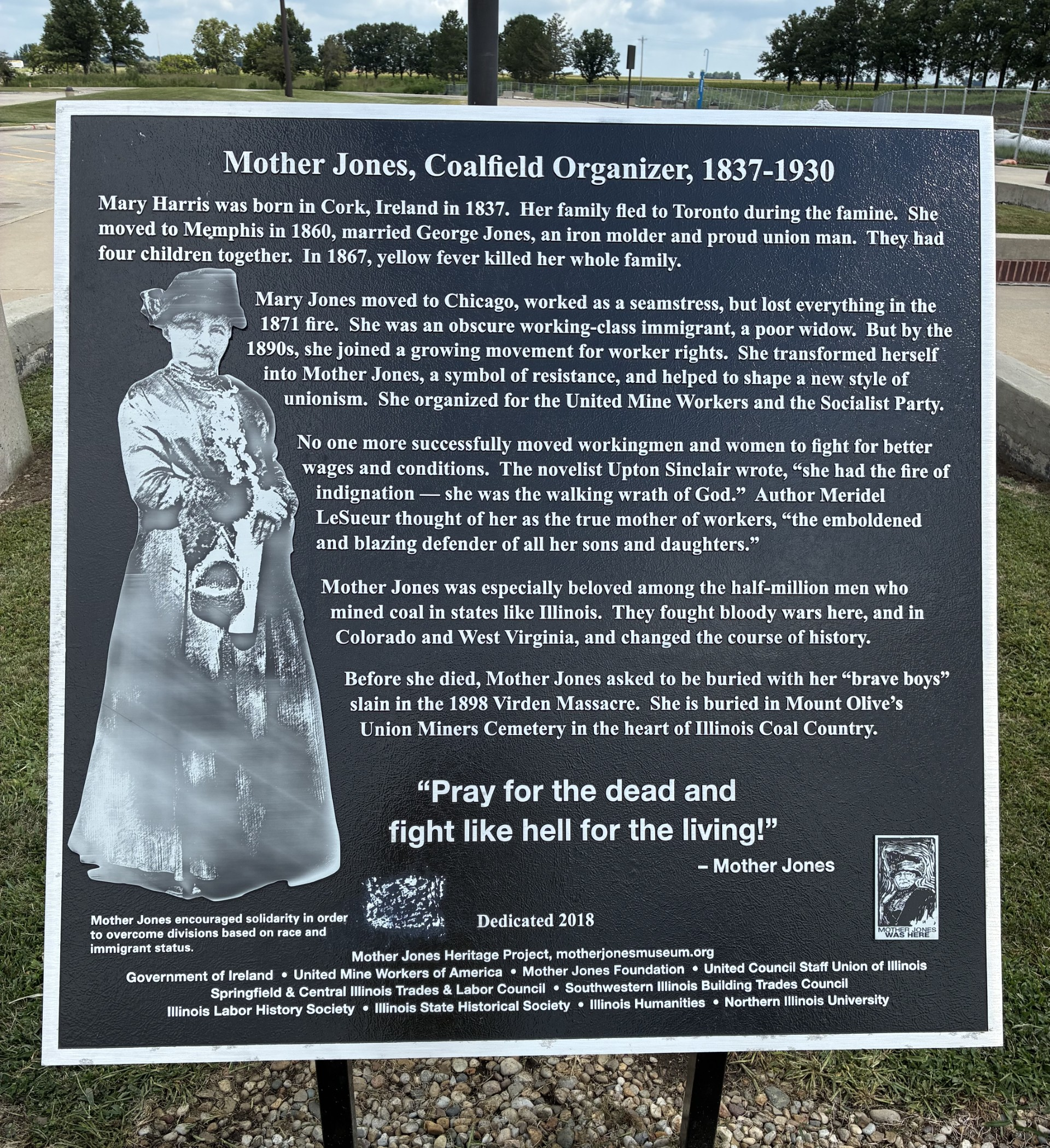
Plaque honoring Mother Jones at rest area in Illinois

- Jones' words are still invoked by union supporters more than a century later: "Pray for the dead and fight like hell for the living." Already known as "the miners' angel" when she was denounced on the floor of the United States Senate as the "grandmother of all agitators", she replied, "I hope to live long enough to be the great-grandmother of all agitators."
- Mother Jones magazine was established in the 1970s and quickly became "the largest selling radical magazine of the decade".
- In 1984, she was inducted into the National Women's Hall of Fame.
- During the bitter 1989–90 Pittston Coal strike in Virginia, West Virginia and Kentucky, the wives and daughters of striking coal miners, inspired by the still-surviving tales of Jones's legendary work among an earlier generation of the region's coal miners, dubbed themselves the "Daughters of Mother Jones". They played a crucial role on the picket lines and in presenting the miners' case to the press and public.
- The Mother Jones Award was granted from 1996 to 2009, though skipping some years, by the Working Women’s History Project and its predecessor, the Women and Labor History Project.
- To coincide with International Women's Day on March 8, 2010 a proposal from Councillor Ted Tynan for a plaque to be erected in Mary Harris Jones's native Cork City was passed by the Cork City Council. Members of the Cork Mother Jones Commemorative Committee unveiled the plaque on August 1, 2012 to mark the 175th anniversary of her birth. The Cork Mother Jones Festival was also held in 2012 in the Shandon area of the city, close to her birthplace, with numerous guest speakers. The festival now takes place annually around the anniversary and has led to growing awareness of Mother Jones's legacy and links between admirers in Ireland and the US. A new documentary, Mother Jones and Her Children, has been produced by Cork-based Frameworks Films and premiered at the Cork festival in 2014.
- In 2019, Mother Jones was inducted into the National Mining Hall of Fame.
- Mary Harris "Mother" Jones Elementary School exists in Adelphi, Maryland.
- Students at Wheeling Jesuit University, Wheeling, West Virginia, can apply to reside in Mother Jones House, an off-campus service house. Residents perform at least ten hours of community service each week and participate in community dinners and events.
- The imprisonment of "Mother" Jones is commemorated by the State of West Virginia through a Historic Highway marker. The marker was made by the West Virginia Division of Culture and History. The marker reads, "PRATT. First settled in the early 1780s and incorporated in 1905. Important site in 1912–13 Paint–Cabin Creek Strike. Labor organizer 'Mother Jones' spent her 84th birthday imprisoned here. Pratt Historic District, listed on the National Register in 1984, recognizes the town's important residential architecture from early plantation to Victorian Styles." The marker is located in the town of Pratt, right off of West Virginia 61.

=== Music and the other arts ===
- On February 25, 1925, Gene Autry recorded the W.C. Callaway composition "The Death Of Mother Jones".
- There is a myth that in The American Songbag (1927), Carl Sandburg suggests that the "she" in "She'll Be Coming 'Round the Mountain" references Mother Jones and her travels to Appalachian mountain coal-mining camps promoting the unionization of the miners. However, there is no reference to Mother Jones in The American Songbag.
- In the book Uncle (1964) by J.P. Martin, a train line is called Mother Jones's Siding and is rumored to be run by Mother Jones.
- The play The Kentucky Cycle: Fire in the Hole (1991) portrays Jones as an inspirational figure one of the other characters knew and was inspired by to go and create unions in other coal towns.
- "The most dangerous woman," a spoken-word performance by indie folk singer/spoken word performer Utah Phillips with music and backing vocals added to it by indie folk artist Ani Difranco, can be found on their collaborative album Fellow Workers (1999). The title refers to the moniker that a West Virginia District Attorney Reese Blizzard gave to Mother Jones, referring to her as "the most dangerous woman in America". Phillips performed the song "The Charge on Mother Jones". This folk song was written by William M. Rogers.
- The title track of folk-roots duo Wishing Chair and Kara Barnard’s 2002 album Dishpan Brigade is about Jones and her role in the 1899–1900 miners' strike in Arnot, Pennsylvania.
- Jones is the "woman" in Tom Russell's song "The Most Dangerous Woman in America," a commentary on the troubles of striking miners that appeared on his 2009 album Blood and Candle Smoke on the Shout! Factory label.
- "The Spirit of Mother Jones" is a track on the 2010 Abocurragh album by Irish singer-songwriter Andy Irvine.
- The play Can't Scare Me...the Story of Mother Jones was written and performed by actress, playwright, and professor Kaiulani Lee. It premiered at the Atlas Theater in Washington, D.C. in 2011, and Lee took the show on tour with the United Mine Workers across Colorado as well as tours in Ireland, Bangladesh, and Cambodia.
- Mother Jones and the Children's Crusade, a musical based on her work in Pennsylvania, debuted in July 2014 as part of the New York Musical Theatre Festival in NYC. The play starred Robin de Jesus and Lynne Wintersteller.
- Victory at Arnot is a work for chamber group and narrator by composer Eleanor Aversa. It recounts how Mother Jones assisted with the coal miners' strike in 1899–1900 in Arnot, Pennsylvania. The piece premiered in Philadelphia in 2016 and was followed by performances in Boston.
- The Trial of Mother Jones, a play by Roger Holzberg, premiered in Oxnard, California, in 2024.

== See also ==
- Irish Americans
