= Paint Creek–Cabin Creek Strike =

Labor strike and violent confrontation in Cabin Creek, West Virginia

Paint Creek–Cabin Creek strike
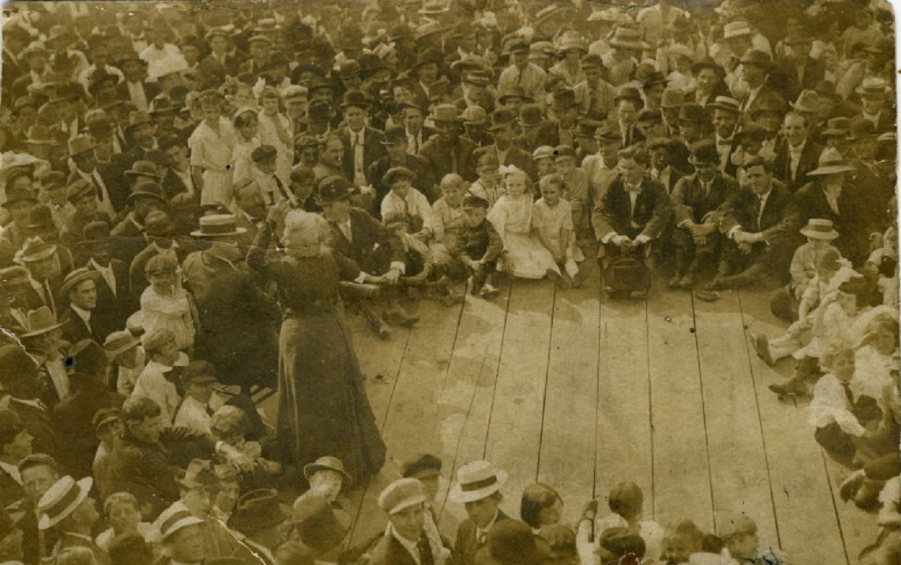
- Labor organizer Mother Jones rallying workers in the town of Montgomery in August 1912
- Date: April 18, 1912 – July 1913
- Location: Cabin Creek, West Virginia, United States
- Goals: Union recognition
- Methods: Strikes, Protest, Demonstrations

Parties
United Mine Workers	Cabin Creek mine operators; Baldwin–Felts Detective Agency

Lead figures
Mother Jones	Bonner Hill; William E. Glasscock

Casualties and losses
Deaths: 50+ Injuries: Arrests: 30+	Deaths: Injuries:

The Paint Creek–Cabin Creek Strike, or the Paint Creek Mine War, was a confrontation between striking coal miners and coal operators in Kanawha County, West Virginia, centered on the area enclosed by two streams, Paint Creek and Cabin Creek.

The strike lasted from April 18, 1912, through July 1913. After the confrontation, Fred Stanton, a banker, estimated that the strike and ensuing violence cost $100 million ($3.258 billion in 2025). The confrontation directly caused perhaps fifty violent deaths, as well as many more deaths indirectly caused by starvation and malnutrition among the striking miners. In the number of casualties it counts among the worst conflicts in American labor union history.

The strike was a prelude to subsequent labor-related West Virginia conflicts in the following years, the Battle of Matewan and the Battle of Blair Mountain.

== The demands ==
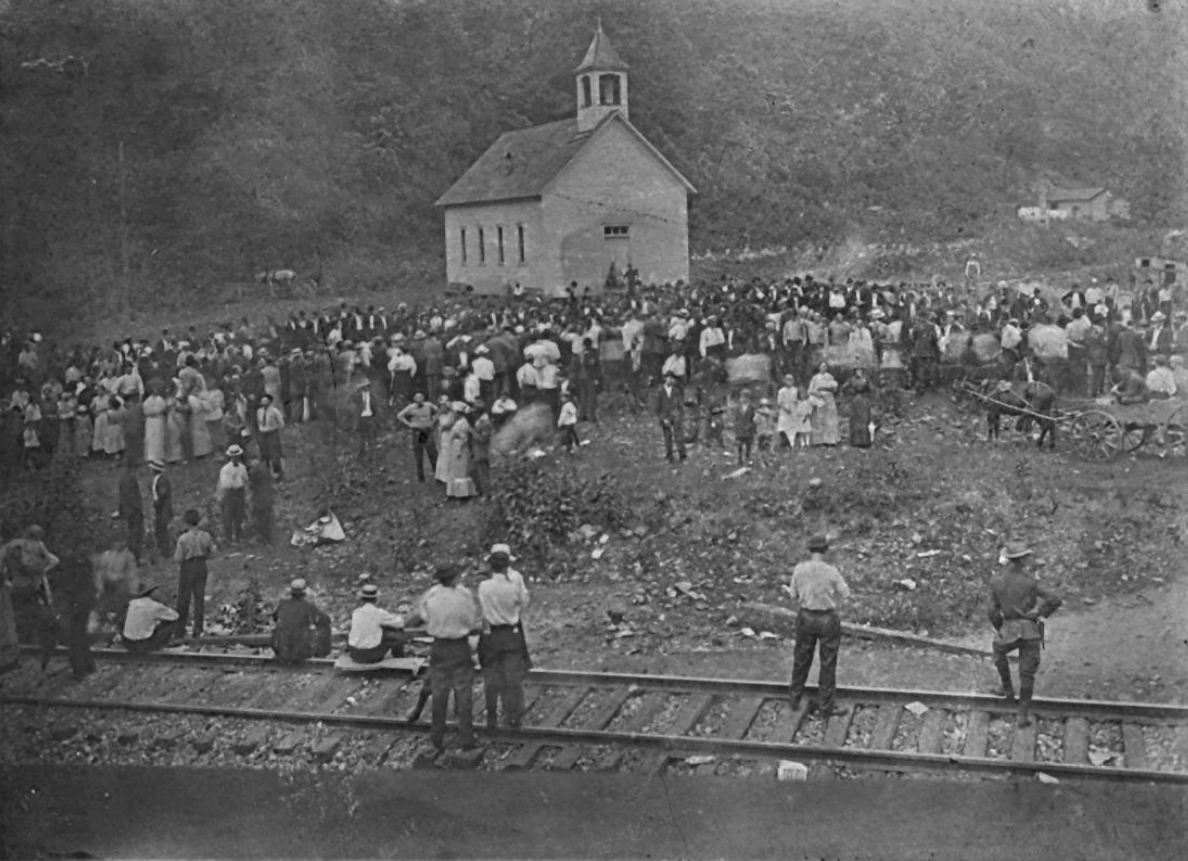
Mother Jones rallies the miners in Eskdale to join the Paint Creek strike.

The violence on Paint Creek and Cabin Creek began with a United Mine Workers of America strike in April 1912.

Prior to the strike there were 96 coal mines in operation on Paint Creek and Cabin Creek, employing 7,500 miners. Of these mines, the forty-one on Paint Creek were all unionized, as was all of the rest of Kanawha River coal field except for the 55 mines on Cabin Creek. However, miners on Paint Creek received compensation of 2 1/2¢ less per ton than other union miners in the area.

When the Paint Creek union negotiated a new contract with the operators in 1912, they demanded that operators raise the compensation rate to the same level as the surrounding area. This increase would have cost operators approximately fifteen cents per miner per day, but the operators refused. The union called a strike for April 18, 1912. Their demands were:

1. That the operators accept and recognize the union.
2. That the miners' right to free speech and peaceable assembly be restored.
3. That black-listing discharged workers be stopped.
4. That compulsory trading at company stores be ended.
5. That cribbing be discontinued and that 2,000 pounds of mined coal constitute a ton. That scales be installed at mines to weigh the tonnage of the miners.
6. That miners be allowed to employ their own check-weighmen to check against the weights found by company check-weighmen, as provided by law.
7. That the two check-weighmen determine all docking penalties.

After little debate, the Cabin Creek miners decided to join the Paint Creek miners and declared their own strike.

== The strike ==
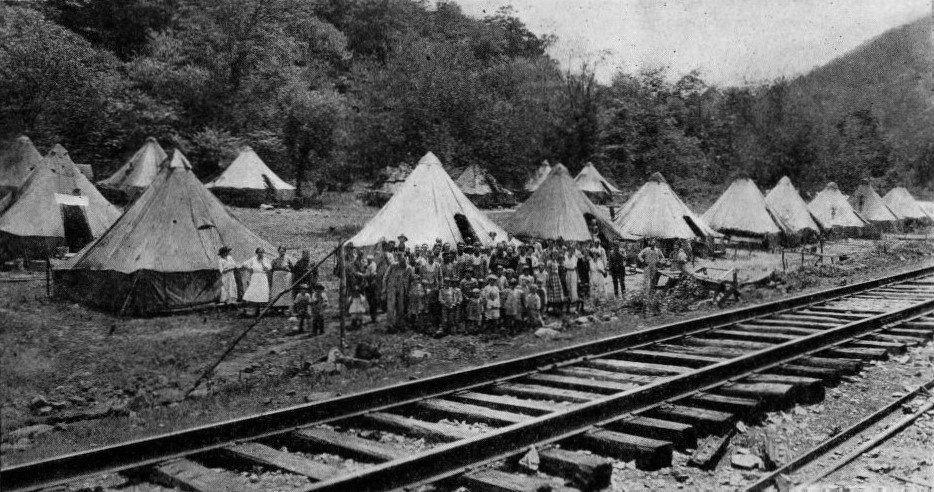
Holly Grove tent colony houses evicted miner families during the strike. (Potentially later in 1922)

After the strike began, the national United Mine Workers pledged full support, hoping to spread the union into Southern West Virginia, a longtime goal of the union. The UMW promised full financing and any aid it could provide to support strikers.

Partly because of the influence of the UMW, the strike was conducted without violence for its first month. However, on May 10, 1912, the operators on Paint Creek and Cabin Creek hired the notorious Baldwin–Felts Detective Agency to break the strike. Baldwin–Felts responded by sending more than 300 mine guards led by Albert Felts, Lee Felts, and Tony Gaujot

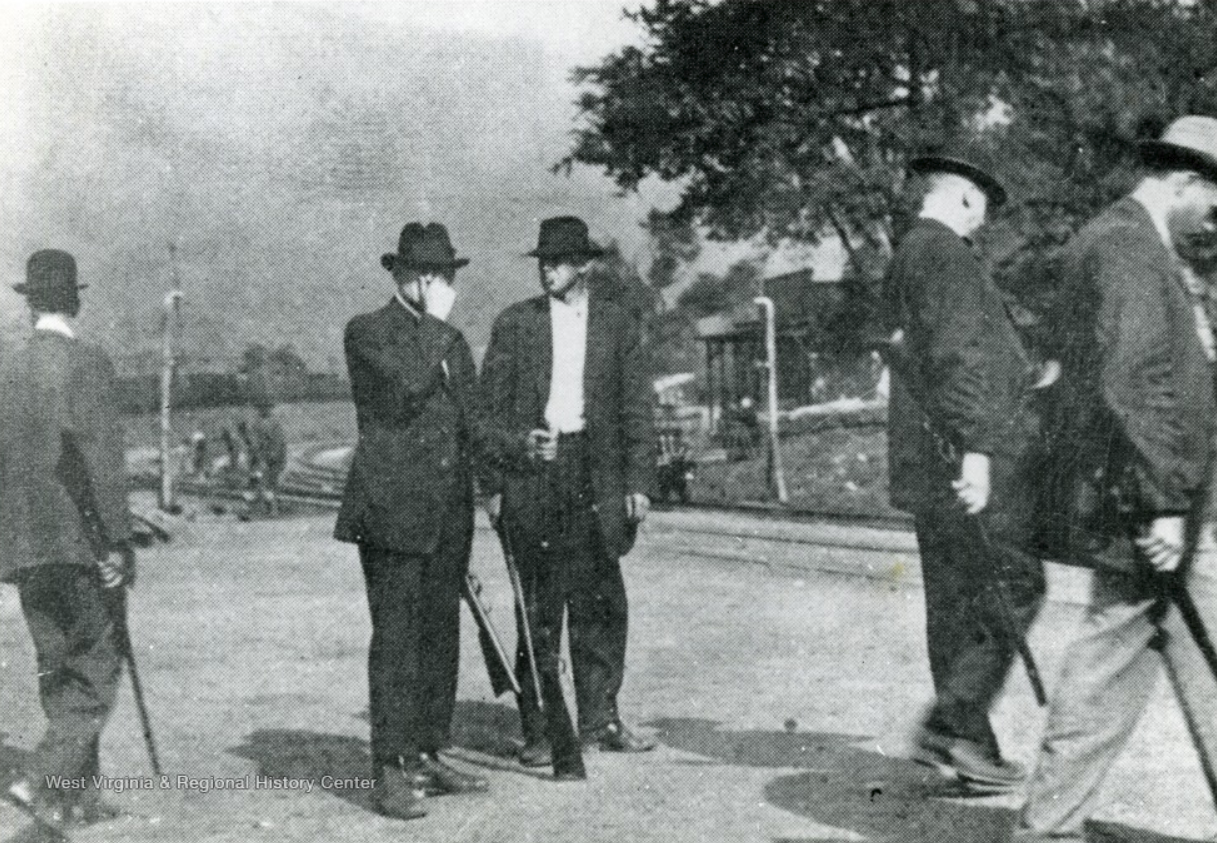
Agents hired by the coal operators to break the strike stand armed.

Activist Mother Jones arrived in June, as mine owners began evicting workers from their rented houses, and brought in replacement workers. Beatings, sniper attacks, and sabotage were daily occurrences. Through July, Jones rallied the workers, made her way through armed guards to persuade another group of miners in Eskdale, West Virginia to join the strike, and organized a secret march of three thousand armed miners to the steps of the state capitol in Charleston to read a declaration of war to Governor William E. Glasscock. On July 26, miners attacked Mucklow, present-day Gallagher, leaving at least twelve strikers and four guards dead.

On September 1, a force of over 5,000 miners from the north side of the Kanawha River joined the strikers' tent city, leading Governor Glasscock to establish martial law in the region the following day. The 1,200 state troops confiscating arms and ammunition from both sides lessened tensions to some degree, but the strikers were forbidden to congregate, and were subject to fast, unfair trials in military court. Meanwhile, strikers' families began to suffer from hunger, cold, and the unsanitary conditions in their temporary tent colony at Holly Grove. Mother Jones and Sarah Blizzard organized an “umbrella march” when pro-union women marched through the valley with umbrellas.

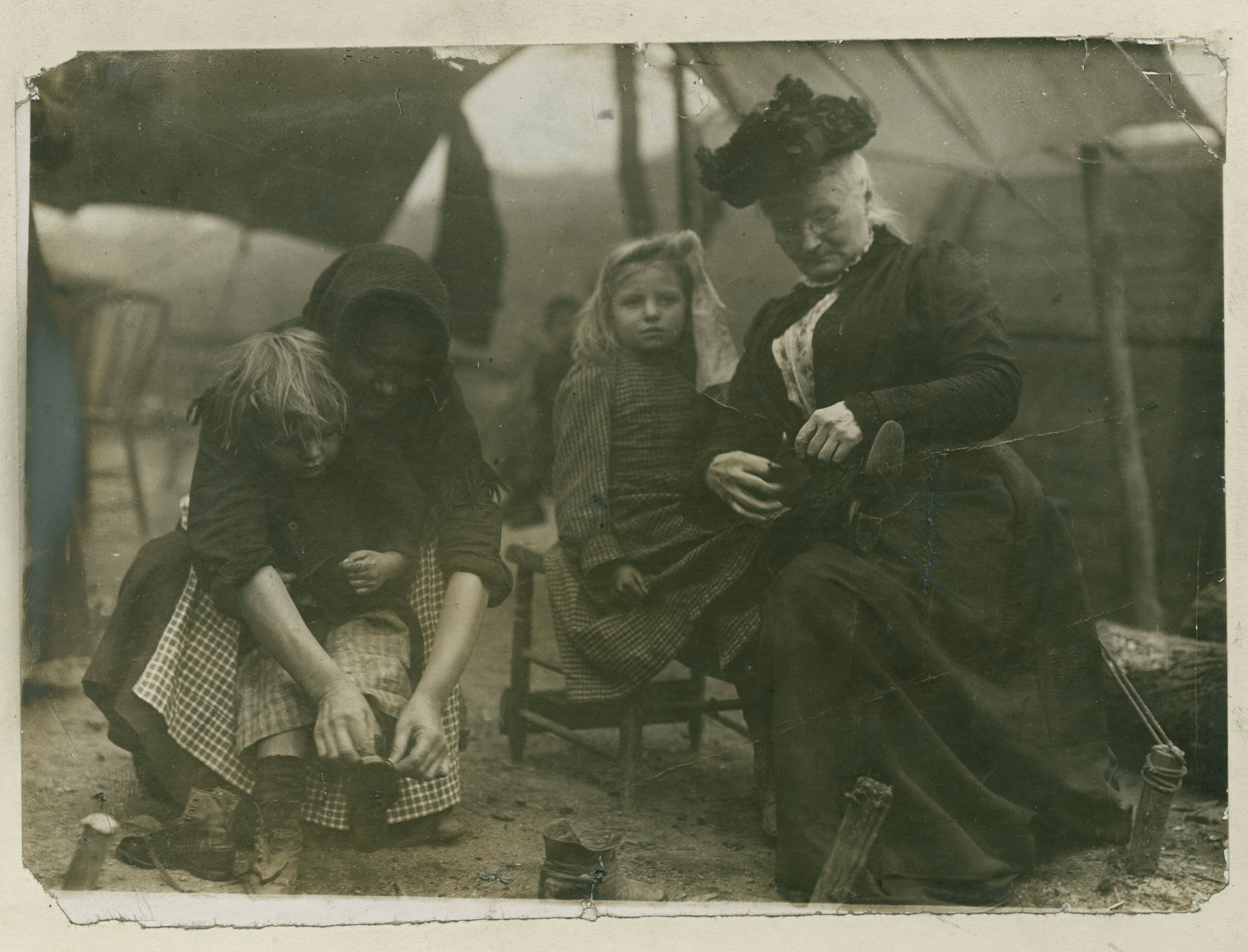
Mother Jones ties the shoelaces of a miner's child in the tent colony.

On October 15, martial law was lifted, only to be re-imposed on November 15 and lifted on January 10 by Governor Glasscock, with less than two months left in office. On February 7 Mucklow was again attacked by miners with at least one casualty. In retaliation that evening, the Kanawha County Sheriff Bonner Hill and a group of detectives attacked the Holly Grove miners' settlement with an armored train, called the "Bull Moose Special", attacking with machine guns and high-powered rifles, putting 100 machine-gun bullets through the frame house of striker Cesco Estep and killing him. Sarah Blizzard led a group of women to damage the railroad tracks used by the train to prevent a second attack. Another miners' raid on Mucklow killed at least two people a few days later, and on February 10 martial law was imposed for the third and final time.

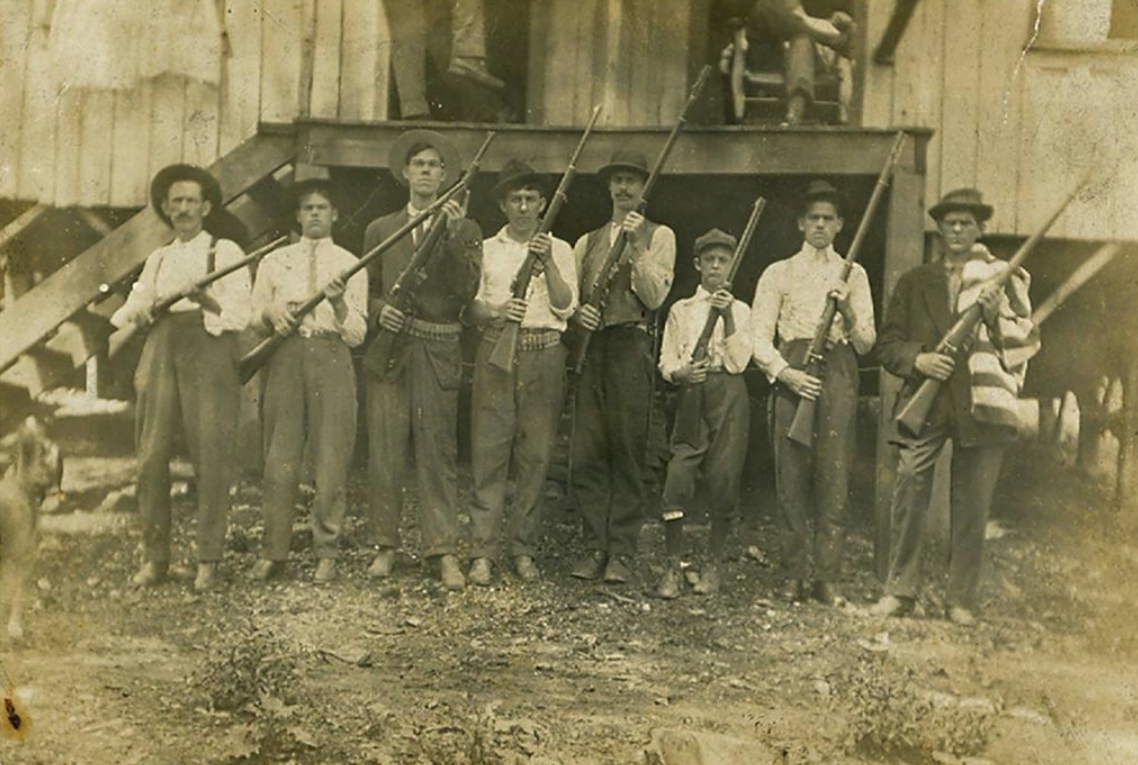
Miners hold their rifles in Eskdale.

Mother Jones was arrested on February 13 in Pratt and charged in military court for inciting riot (reportedly for attempting to read the Declaration of Independence), and, later, conspiracy to commit murder. She refused to recognize the jurisdiction of the military court, and refused to enter a plea. Jones was sentenced to twenty years in the state penitentiary and acquired a case of pneumonia.

New governor Dr. Henry D. Hatfield was sworn in on March 4 and immediately traveled to the area as his first priority. He released some thirty individuals held under martial law, transferred Mother Jones to Charleston for medical treatment, and in April moved to impose conditions for the strike settlement. Strikers had the choice to accept Hatfield's somewhat favorable terms, or be deported from the state. The Paint Creek miners accepted and signed the "Hatfield Contract" on May 1. The Cabin Creek miners continued to resist, with some violence, until the end of July.

== Aftermath ==
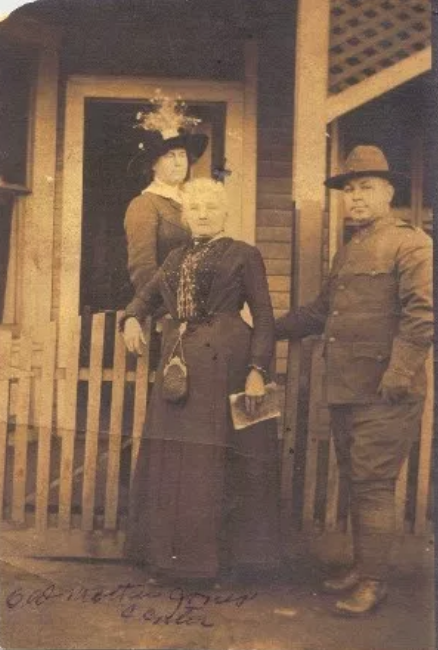
Mother Jones outside her jailhouse in Pratt, West Virginia

Mother Jones remained under house arrest, in Mrs. Carney's Boarding House, until she smuggled out a message through a secret trapdoor in her room, a message sent to pro-labor Indiana Senator John Worth Kern. Governor Hatfield released Jones, without comment, after a total of 85 days imprisonment.

The Senate's Kern Resolution of May 26, 1913, led to the United States Senate's Committee on Education and Labor opening an investigation into conditions in West Virginia coal mines. Congress almost immediately authorized two similar investigations into the copper mining industry in Michigan, and mining conditions in Colorado.

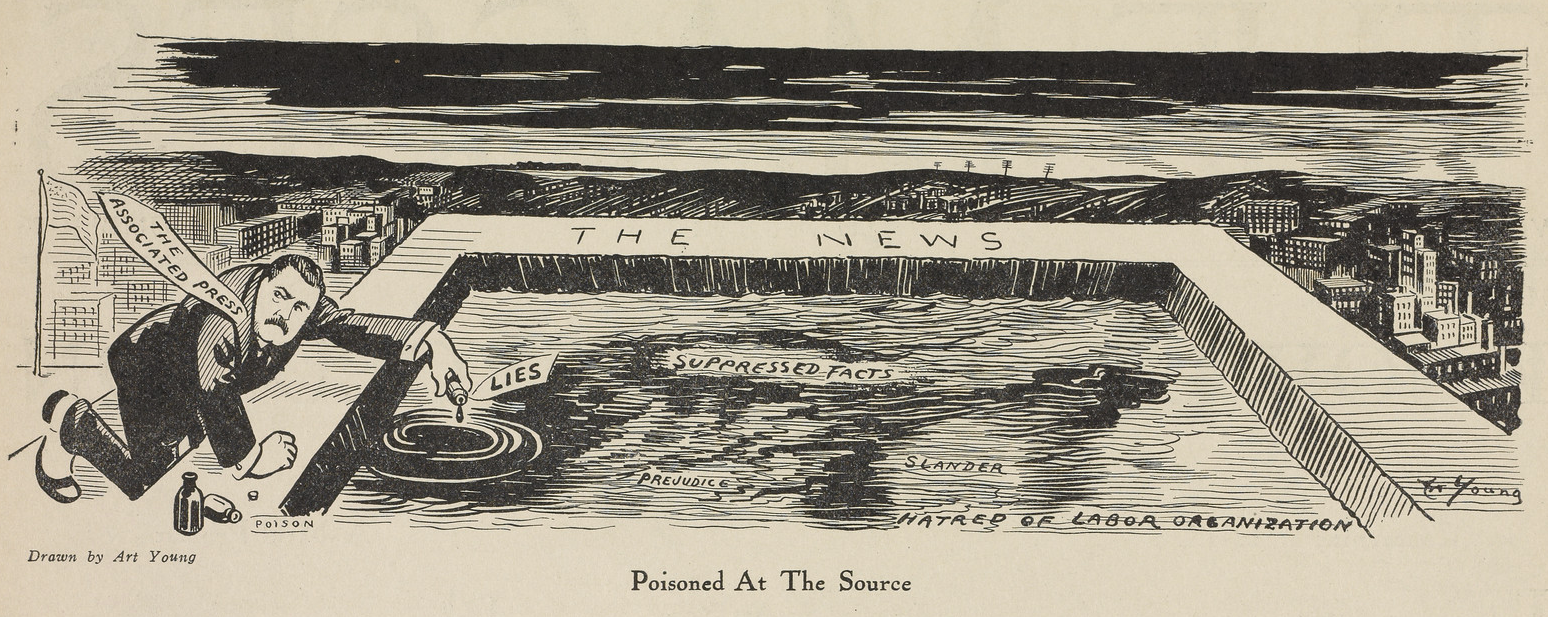
Associated Press poisoning the well of the news with suppressed facts, lies, prejudice, slander, and hatred of labor organization, July 1913

One theme of the Senate hearings was an attempt to identify the number of deaths related to the strike, and responsibility for them. One source estimates "perhaps fifty violent deaths" without estimating the effect of the conditions in the tent camp.

The strike came to national attention in July 1913, cartoonist Art Young published a cartoon in The Masses called "Poisoned at the Source" depicting the president of The Associated Press, Frank B. Noyes, poisoning a well labeled 'The News' with lies, suppressed facts, slander, and prejudice. It was accompanied by an editorial by Max Eastman claiming that the AP had not only suppressed the facts of the strike, but that the AP had a profound conflict of interest. Despite the AP's denials, its local AP representative, Cal Young, was also a member of the military tribunal passing judgment on the strikers. The AP responded with two suits of criminal libel against Eastman and Young in November 1913 and January 1914. Both suits eventually were dropped. The AP's specific reasons for dropping the suits, and its general relationship to labor, are explored in Upton Sinclair's 1919 exposé The Brass Check.

The United Mine Workers of America, Mother Jones, and Baldwin-Felts Detectives would all be involved in the Colorado Coalfield War, which began as a strike against the Rockefeller-owned Colorado Fuel and Iron company in September 1913 and saw the April 20, 1914 Ludlow Massacre.

== See also ==
- Murder of workers in labor disputes in the United States
- West Virginia Mine Wars Museum
