= Carlinville Historic District =

Historic district in Illinois, United States

- U.S. National Register of Historic Places
- U.S. Historic district
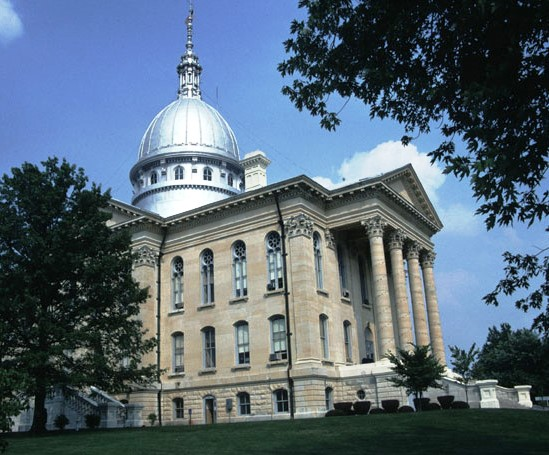
- The Macoupin County Courthouse

- Location within Illinois Location within the United States
- Location: Roughly bounded by Oak, Mulberry, Morgan, and E. city limits, Carlinville, Illinois
- Coordinates: 39°16′46″N 89°52′17″W
- Area: 34 acres (14 ha)
- Architectural style: Greek Revival, Italianate, Federal, Queen Anne
- NRHP reference No.: 76000721
- Added to NRHP: May 17, 1976

The Carlinville Historic District includes the oldest sections of Carlinville, Illinois. The district consists of much of central and eastern Carlinville and is roughly bounded by Oak Street, Mulberry Street, Morgan Street, and the eastern city limits. The Macoupin County Courthouse, a Beaux-Arts building built in 1867–70, is the focal point of the district. The courthouse is situated in a public square in downtown Carlinville and is surrounded by some of the city's oldest businesses. The district also includes large residential sections; popular architectural styles in these areas include Federal, Greek Revival, Italianate, and Queen Anne.

The district was added to the National Register of Historic Places on May 17, 1976.
