= Union Miners Cemetery =

Historic place in Illinois

- U.S. National Register of Historic Places
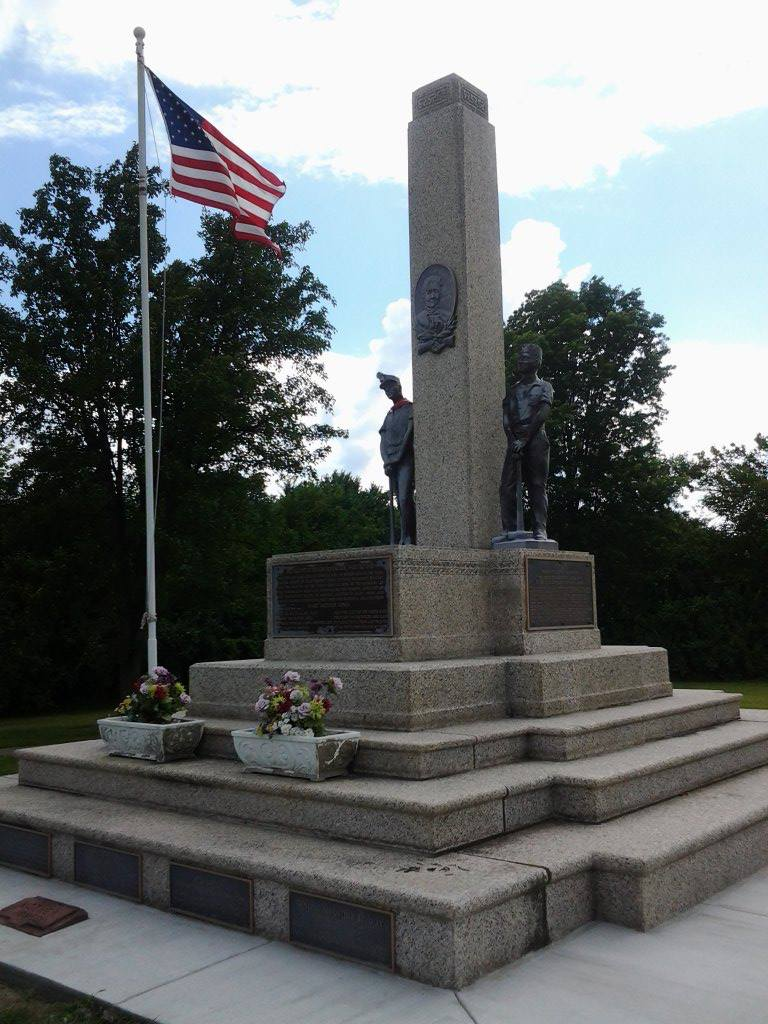
- Mother Jones and Martyrs of the Progressive Miners of America Monument

- Location within Illinois Location within the United States
- Location: 0.5 mi. N of Mount Olive city park, Mount Olive, Illinois
- Coordinates: 39°4′52″N 89°43′53″W
- Area: 3 acres (1.2 ha)
- Built: 1899
- NRHP reference No.: 72000463
- Added to NRHP: October 18, 1972

The Union Miners Cemetery is a cemetery in Mount Olive, Illinois. The cemetery is the burial site of labor leader Mary Harris "Mother" Jones. Miners Day has been celebrated on October 12 at the cemetery since 1899. It is the only union-owned cemetery in the United States.

== History ==
After the Battle of Virden on October 12, 1898, four of the miners who were killed were from Mount Olive. However, the owner of the "privately owned town cemetery did not want dead miners buried there to prevent the cemetery from becoming a miners shrine." The nearby Immanual Lutheran Church cemetery also did not want the bodies because the church leaders thought the rioters were "murderers".

Adolph Germer proposed the local union purchase their own plot of land.

The United Mine Workers of America (UMWA) established the cemetery on one acre of land in September 1899. The cemetery expanded in 1902 and 1918. Land was added in 1931 for the planned Mother Jones monument.

In 1932, the Progressive Mine Workers (PMWA) assumed ownership of the cemetery.

The cemetery was listed on the National Register of Historic Places on October 18, 1972.

Currently the Union Miners Cemetery Maintenance Committee maintains the cemetery.

=== Mother Jones Monument ===
The cemetery is the burial site of labor leader Mary Harris "Mother" Jones, who is memorialized with a 22-foot (6.7 m) granite monument. Over the course of two years starting in 1934, over $16,000 in funds were raised by the PMWA Local 35. The monument was constructed from 80 tons of Minnesota pink granite, 22-feet tall on a 20-foot wide base. The center granite spire features a bas-relief of Mother Jones and is flanked with bronze statues of two miners. All construction labor of the monument was donated.

The monument was erected in 1936 and unveiled to a crowd of over 50,000 union members and their families, activists, and government officials.

The monument and surrounding plaques also commemorate "General" Alexander Bradley, four victims of the Battle of Virden, and twenty-one other miners who died in labor struggles.
