= Mount Olive, Illinois =

- City
- Location in Macoupin County, Illinois
- Coordinates: 39°04′22″N 89°44′15″W
- Country: United States
- State: Illinois
- County: Macoupin
- Township: Mount Olive

Area
  - Total: 1.156 sq mi (2.99 km^{2})
  - Land: 1.153 sq mi (2.99 km^{2})
  - Water: 0.003 sq mi (0.0078 km^{2})
- Elevation: 682 ft (208 m)

Population (2020)
  - Total: 2,015
  - Density: 1,746.9/sq mi (674.49/km^{2})
- Time zone: UTC−6 (CST)
  - Summer (DST): UTC−5 (CDT)
- ZIP code: 62069
- Area code: 217
- FIPS code: 17-51024
- GNIS feature ID: 2395123

Mount Olive is a city in Macoupin County, Illinois, United States. The population was 2,015 at the 2020 census. The city is part of the Metro East region within the St. Louis metropolitan area.

== History ==
On May 20, 2013, a brief but damaging tornado impacted the city, dealing EF2 damage within downtown and minorly injuring three people.

== Geography ==
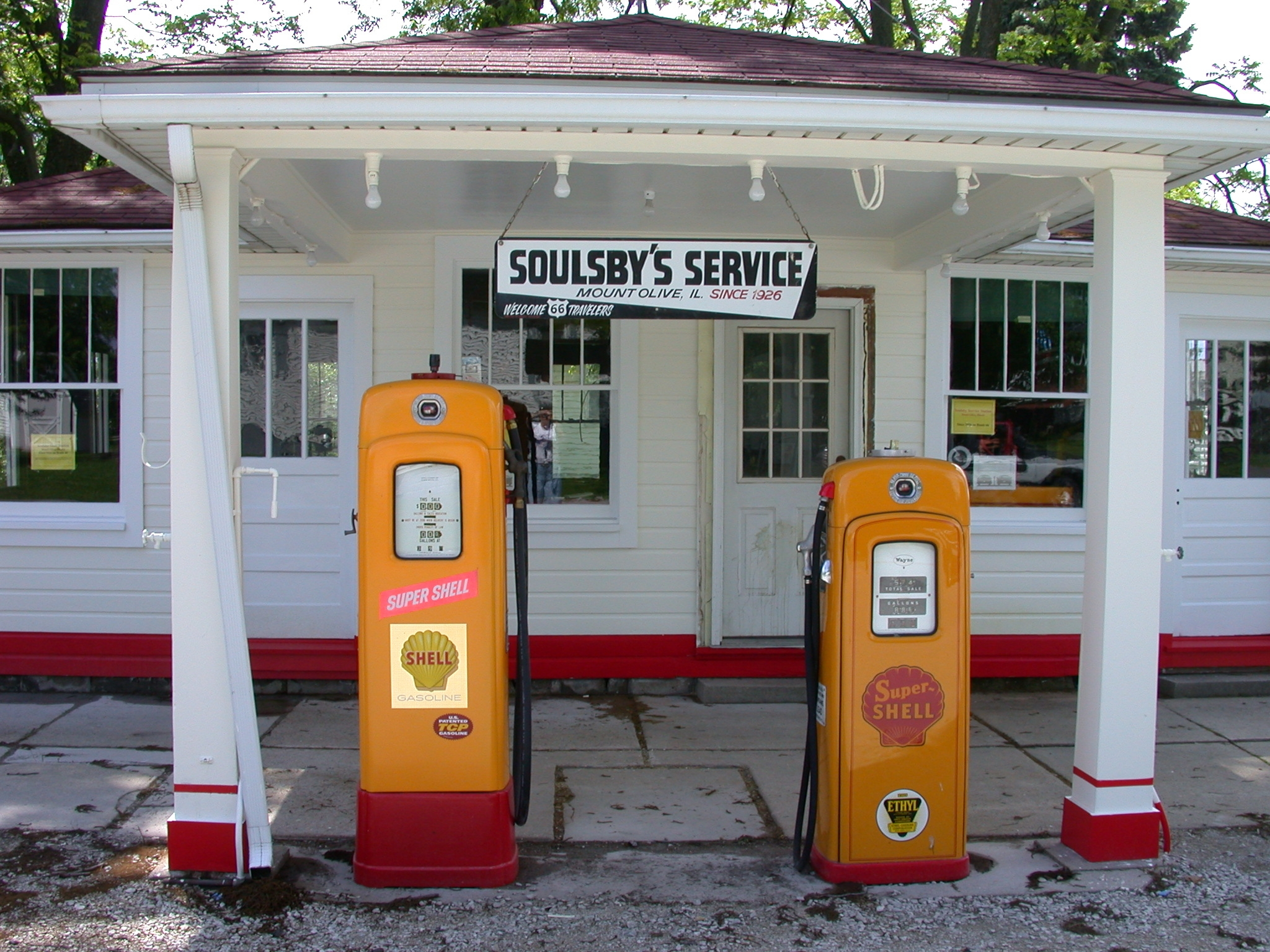
Soulsby Service Station along former U.S. Route 66

Mount Olive is located in southeastern Macoupin County. Illinois Route 138 has its eastern terminus in the city, leading west 5 miles (8 km) to Benld. Former U.S. Route 66 passed through the north and west sides of the city and later on a wider alignment farther north and west of the city. Both routings are now local roads, as Interstate 55 now passes 1 mile (1.6 km) west of town, with access from Exit 44 (IL 138). Old Route 66 leads 8 miles (13 km) northeast to Litchfield and southwest 6 miles (10 km) to Staunton, and I-55 leads north 50 miles (80 km) to Springfield and southwest 45 miles (72 km) to St. Louis.

According to the U.S. Census Bureau, Mount Olive has a total area of 1.16 square miles (3.00 km^{2}), of which 0.003 square miles (0.01 km^{2}), or 0.26%, are water. The city drains west to tributaries of Cahokia Creek, a west-flowing direct tributary of the Mississippi River, and southeast to Silver Creek, a south-flowing tributary of the Kaskaskia River.

== Demographics ==
Historical population
Census	Pop.	Note	%±
1880	709		—
1890	1,986		180.1%
1900	2,935		47.8%
1910	3,501		19.3%
1920	3,503		0.1%
1930	3,079		−12.1%
1940	2,559		−16.9%
1950	2,401		−6.2%
1960	2,295		−4.4%
1970	2,288		−0.3%
1980	2,357		3.0%
1990	2,126		−9.8%
2000	2,150		1.1%
2010	2,099		−2.4%
2020	2,015		−4.0%
U.S. Decennial Census

=== 2020 census ===
As of the 2020 census, Mount Olive had a population of 2,015. The median age was 44.7 years. 21.4% of residents were under the age of 18 and 20.5% of residents were 65 years of age or older. For every 100 females there were 95.8 males, and for every 100 females age 18 and over there were 91.4 males age 18 and over.

0.0% of residents lived in urban areas, while 100.0% lived in rural areas.

There were 883 households in Mount Olive, of which 25.9% had children under the age of 18 living in them. Of all households, 45.3% were married-couple households, 18.6% were households with a male householder and no spouse or partner present, and 26.5% were households with a female householder and no spouse or partner present. About 30.8% of all households were made up of individuals and 13.1% had someone living alone who was 65 years of age or older.

There were 988 housing units, of which 10.6% were vacant. The homeowner vacancy rate was 2.4% and the rental vacancy rate was 10.0%.

Racial composition as of the 2020 census
Race	Number	Percent
White	1,906	94.6%
Black or African American	5	0.2%
American Indian and Alaska Native	1	0.0%
Asian	2	0.1%
Native Hawaiian and Other Pacific Islander	0	0.0%
Some other race	10	0.5%
Two or more races	91	4.5%
Hispanic or Latino (of any race)	28	1.4%

=== 2000 census ===
As of the census of 2000, there were 2,150 people, 906 households, and 609 families residing in the city. The population density was 1,948.2 inhabitants per square mile (752.2/km^{2}). There were 991 housing units at an average density of 898.0 per square mile (346.7/km^{2}). The racial makeup of the city was 96.79% White, 0.83% Native American, 0.64% Asian, 1.28% from other races, and 0.47% from two or more races. Hispanic or Latino of any race were 3% of the population.

There were 906 households, out of which 30.7% had children under the age of 18 living with them, 54.6% were married couples living together, 8.9% had a female householder with no husband present, and 32.7% were non-families. 29.6% of all households were made up of individuals, and 19.3% had someone living alone who was 65 years of age or older. The average household size was 2.37 and the average family size was 2.92.

In the city, the population was spread out, with 23.5% under the age of 18, 7.7% from 18 to 24, 28.8% from 25 to 44, 19.9% from 45 to 64, and 20.1% who were 65 years of age or older. The median age was 39 years. For every 100 females, there were 95.6 males. For every 100 females age 18 and over, there were 88.6 males.

The median income for a household in the city was $35,065, and the median income for a family was $41,765. Males had a median income of $30,709 versus $21,125 for females. The per capita income for the city was $17,172. About 6.1% of families and 6.1% of the population were below the poverty line, including 7.0% of those under age 18 and 6.7% of those age 65 or over.

== Notable people ==
- Frank Biscan, pitcher for the St Louis Browns
- Jess Dobernic, pitcher for three teams
- Elmer Droste, Illinois state senator and lawyer
- Adolph Germer (1881–1966), National Executive Secretary of the Socialist Party of America
- Mary Harris Jones, aka "Mother Jones", famed labor organizer; buried in Mount Olive at the Union Miners Cemetery
- Mike Kreevich, player for five teams

== Points of interest ==
In Mount Olive is located the Union Miners Cemetery where miners killed in the Battle of Virden and community and labor organizer Mary Harris "Mother" Jones are buried. The cemetery sits just south of former U.S. Route 66.
