= Hagaman, Illinois =

- Unincorporated community
- Location within Illinois Location within the United States
- Coordinates: 39°18′37″N 90°04′41″W
- Country: United States
- State: Illinois
- County: Macoupin
- Elevation: 518 ft (158 m)
- Time zone: UTC-6 (Central (CST))
  - Summer (DST): UTC-5 (CDT)
- Area code: 618
- GNIS feature ID: 422770

Hagaman is an unincorporated community in Macoupin County, Illinois, United States. Hagaman is 4 miles (6.4 km) southwest of Hettick.
