= Shriver Farmstead =

- U.S. National Register of Historic Places
- Location within Illinois Location within the United States
- Nearest city: Virden, Illinois
- Coordinates: 39°31′20″N 89°48′47″W
- Area: 6.12 acres (2.48 ha)
- Built: 1858-1860
- Architectural style: Italianate
- NRHP reference No.: 80001387
- Added to NRHP: September 29, 1980

The Shriver Farmstead is a historic farm located on County Line Road northwest of Virden, Illinois. The farm consists of an historic mansion, two barns and a smokehouse; it also includes a creek on 6.12 acres (2.48 ha) of land. Owner John Ryan built the farm's original buildings from 1858 to 1860. The mansion has an Italianate design which features a front porch supported by square posts, paired brackets below the eaves, pilasters at the corners, and a projecting gable above the entrance. The house consists of 3 stories plus a large full basement. The interior boasts 12 foot ceilings and 9 foot doors. It also retains all of the original woodwork, including the floors. The barn, one of two built for the farm, has a New World Dutch-inspired plan which incorporates elements of several barn styles. Dr. William Shriver purchased the farm in 1890, and his family has owned the property until very recently. It was part of the Underground Railroad.

The farm was added to the National Register of Historic Places on September 29, 1980.
