= Cabin Creek, West Virginia =

Unincorporated community in West Virginia, United States

- Unincorporated community
- Location within West Virginia Location within the United States
- Coordinates: 38°11′45″N 81°28′39″W
- Country: United States
- State: West Virginia
- County: Kanawha
- Elevation: 630 ft (190 m)
- Time zone: UTC-5 (Eastern (EST))
  - Summer (DST): UTC-4 (EDT)
- ZIP code: 25035
- Area codes: 304 & 681
- GNIS feature ID: 1536823

Cabin Creek is an unincorporated community in Kanawha County, West Virginia, United States. Cabin Creek is located on the south bank of the Kanawha River at the mouth of Cabin Creek, southeast of Chesapeake. A notable resident was Adam Clayton Powell, Sr. and his family, who had moved there from Virginia. An exit on the West Virginia Turnpike is located near here.

== Notable people ==
- Adam Clayton Powell, Sr. (1865–1953), his parents moved here with Adam and his siblings before 1880, and lived here several years. He married his wife near here in 1889 before going to Washington, DC to Wayland Seminary. He later became the pastor of Abyssinian Baptist Church in Harlem, New York, attracting the largest Protestant congregation in the nation.
- Hercules Renda (1917–2005), football player at University of Michigan and coach
- Jerry West (1938–2024), NBA player for the Los Angeles Lakers and NBA general manager. West's nicknames included 'Zeke from Cabin Creek' and 'the Cabin Creek Comet'
- Lou Myers (1935 – 2013) American actor best known for the role of Mr. Vernon Gaines on the series A Different World.
