= 1937 Big Ten Conference football season =

- Sport: Football
- Number of teams: 10
- Top draft pick: Corbett Davis
- Champion: Minnesota
- Runners-up: Ohio State
- Season MVP: Corbett Davis

Football seasons
- ← 1936 1938 →

1937 Big Ten Conference football standings
	Conf.					Overall
Team	W		L		T	W		L		T
No. 5 Minnesota $	5	–	0	–	0	6	–	2	–	0
No. 13 Ohio State	5	–	1	–	0	6	–	2	–	0
Indiana	3	–	2	–	0	5	–	3	–	0
Michigan	3	–	3	–	0	4	–	4	–	0
Northwestern	3	–	3	–	0	4	–	4	–	0
Purdue	2	–	2	–	1	4	–	3	–	1
Wisconsin	2	–	2	–	1	4	–	3	–	1
Illinois	2	–	3	–	0	3	–	3	–	2
Chicago	0	–	4	–	0	1	–	6	–	0
Iowa	0	–	5	–	0	1	–	7	–	0
$ – Conference champion; Rankings from AP Poll

The 1937 Big Ten Conference football season was the 42nd season of college football played by the member schools of the Big Ten Conference (also known as the Western Conference) and was a part of the 1937 college football season.

The 1937 Minnesota Golden Gophers football team, under head coach Bernie Bierman, won the Big Ten championship, led the conference in scoring offense (23.0 points per game), compiled a 6–2 record, and was ranked No. 5 in the final AP poll. End Ray King was named a first-team All-American by two selectors, and fullback Andy Uram was received first-team honors from the Associated Press. Halfback Rudy Gmitro was awarded the team's most valuable player award.

The 1937 Ohio State Buckeyes football team, under head coach Francis Schmidt finished in second place with a 6–2 record, shut out six of eight opponents, led the Big Ten in scoring defense (2.9 points allowed per game), and was ranked No. 8 in the final AP poll. Guard Gust Zarnas was selected as a first-team All-American by three selectors. Back Jim McDonald was the second player selected in the 1938 NFL draft.

Corbett Davis of Indiana won the Chicago Tribune Silver Football trophy as the Big Ten's most valuable player. He was also the first player selected in the 1938 NFL draft.

== Season overview ==
=== Results and team statistics ===
Conf. Rank	Team	Head coach	AP final	AP high	Overall record	Conf. record	PPG	PAG	MVP
1	Minnesota	Bernie Bierman	#5	#4	6-2	5-0	23.0	6.3	Rudy Gmitro
2	Ohio State	Francis Schmidt	#13	#8	6–2	5–1	15.6	2.9	Ralph Wolf
3	Indiana	Bo McMillin	NR	#17	5–3	3–2	9.0	4.0	Corbett Davis
4 (tie)	Purdue	Mal Elward	NR	NR	4–3–1	2–2–1	10.4	8.6	Cecil Isbell
4 (tie)	Wisconsin	Harry Stuhldreher	NR	#16	4–3–1	2–2–1	12.9	7.6	Howard Weiss
6 (tie)	Michigan	Harry Kipke	NR	NR	4–4	3–3	6.8	13.8	Ralph Heikkinen
6 (tie)	Northwestern	Pappy Waldorf	NR	#7	4–4	3–3	8.5	5.0	Don Heap
8	Illinois	Robert Zuppke	NR	NR	3–3–2	2–3	7.4	5.6	Jack Berner
9 (tie)	Chicago	Clark Shaughnessy	NR	NR	1–6	0–4	6.4	20.4	Kendall Peterson
9 (tie)	Iowa	Irl Tubbs	NR	NR	1–7	0–5	4.5	15.0	Bob Lannon

Key
PPG = Average of points scored per game
PAG = Average of points allowed per game
MVP = Most valuable player as voted by players on each team as part of the voting process to determine the winner of the Chicago Tribune Silver Football trophy

=== Regular season ===
==== September 25 ====
- Minnesota 69, North Dakota State 7.
- Ohio State 14, TCU 0
- Indiana 12, Centre 0.
- Northwestern 33, Iowa State 0.
- Purdue 33, Butler 7.
- Wisconsin 32, South Dakota State 0.
- Illinois 20, Ohio 6.
- Vanderbilt 18, Chicago 0.
- Washington 14, Iowa 0.

==== October 2 ====
- Nebraska 14, Minnesota 9.
- Ohio State 13, Purdue 0.
- Michigan State 19, Michigan 14.
- Wisconsin 12, Marquette 0.
- Illinois 0, DePaul 0.

==== October 9 ====
- Minnesota 6, Indiana 0.
- USC 13, Ohio State 12.
- Northwestern 7, Michigan 0.
- Wisconsin 27, Chicago 0.
- Iowa 14, Bradley Tech 7.
- Purdue 7, Carnegie Mellon 0.
- Illinois 0, Notre Dame 0.

==== October 16 ====
- Indiana 13, Illinois 6.
- Minnesota 39, Michigan 6.
- Northwestern 14, Purdue 7.
- Wisconsin 13, Iowa 6.

==== October 23 ====
- Michigan 7, Iowa 6.
- Ohio State 7, Northwestern 0.
- Indiana 27, Cincinnati 0.
- Pittsburgh 21, Wisconsin 0.

==== October 30 ====
- Notre Dame 7, Minnesota 6.
- Michigan 7, Illinois 6.
- Northwestern 14, Wisconsin 6.
- Ohio State 39, Chicago 0.
- Purdue 13, Iowa 0.
- Nebraska 7, Indiana 0.

==== November 6 ====
- Illinois 6, Northwestern 0.
- Indiana 10, Ohio State 0.
- Michigan 13, Chicago 12.
- Minnesota 35, Iowa 10.
- Fordham 21, Purdue 3.

==== November 13 ====
- Indiana 3, Iowa 0.
- Minnesota 7, Northwestern 0.
- Ohio State 19, Illinois 0.
- Purdue 7, Wisconsin 7.
- Michigan 7, Penn 0.
- Chicago 26, Beloit 9.

==== November 20 ====
- Illinois 21, Chicago 0.
- Minnesota 13, Wisconsin 6.
- Ohio State 21, Michigan 0.
- Purdue 13, Indiana 7.
- Notre Dame 7, Northwestern 0.
- Nebraska 28, Iowa 0.

=== Bowl games ===
No Big Ten teams participated in any bowl games during the 1937 season.

== All-Big Ten players ==
The following players were picked by the Associated Press (AP) and/or the United Press (UP) as first-team players on the 1937 All-Big Ten Conference football team.

Position	Name	Team	Selectors
Quarterback	Jim McDonald	Ohio State	AP, UP
Halfback	Cecil Isbell	Purdue	AP
Halfback	Don Heap	Northwestern	AP
Halfback	Nile Kinnick	Iowa	UP
Halfback	Rudy Gmitro	Minnesota	UP
Fullback	Corbett Davis	Indiana	AP, UP
End	Ray King	Minnesota	AP, UP
End	Bob Lannon	Iowa	AP
End	Jim Zachary	Purdue	UP
Tackle	Lou Midler	Minnesota	AP
Tackle	Marty Schreyer	Purdue	AP
Tackle	Bob Haak	Indiana	UP
Tackle	Carl Kaplanoff	Ohio State	UP
Guard	Francis Twedell	Minnesota	AP, UP
Guard	Gust Zarnas	Ohio State	AP
Guard	Ralph Heikkinen	Michigan	UP
Center	Ralph Wolf	Ohio State	AP
Center	George Miller	Indiana	UP

== All-Americans ==
No Big Ten players were selected as consensus first-team players on the 1937 College Football All-America Team. However, three Big Ten players received first-team honors from at least one selector. They were:

Position	Name	Team	Selectors
Halfback	Corbett Davis	Indiana	CP, WCFF, AAB, LIB, NANA, NW
End	Ray King	Minnesota	INS, CE, WCFF, AAB, NW
Guard	Gust Zarnas	Ohio State	WCFF, AAB, NW

== 1938 NFL draft ==
The following Big Ten players were selected in the first seven rounds of the 1938 NFL draft:

Name	Position	Team	Round	Overall pick
Corbett Davis	Back	Indiana	1	1
Jim McDonald	Back	Ohio State	1	2
Cecil Isbell	Back	Purdue	1	7
Frank Filchock	Back	Indiana	2	14
Marty Schreyer	Tackle	Purdue	3	22
Fred Vanzo	Back	Northwestern	3	23
Lou Midler	Tackle	Minnesota	5	34
Gust Zarnas	Guard	Ohio State	5	40
Andy Uram	Back	Minnesota	6	47
Bob Lannon	End	Iowa	7	52
Ray King	End	Minnesota	7	54
Johnny Kovatch	End	Northwestern	7	57
