= Paint Creek (West Virginia) =

River in West Virginia, United States

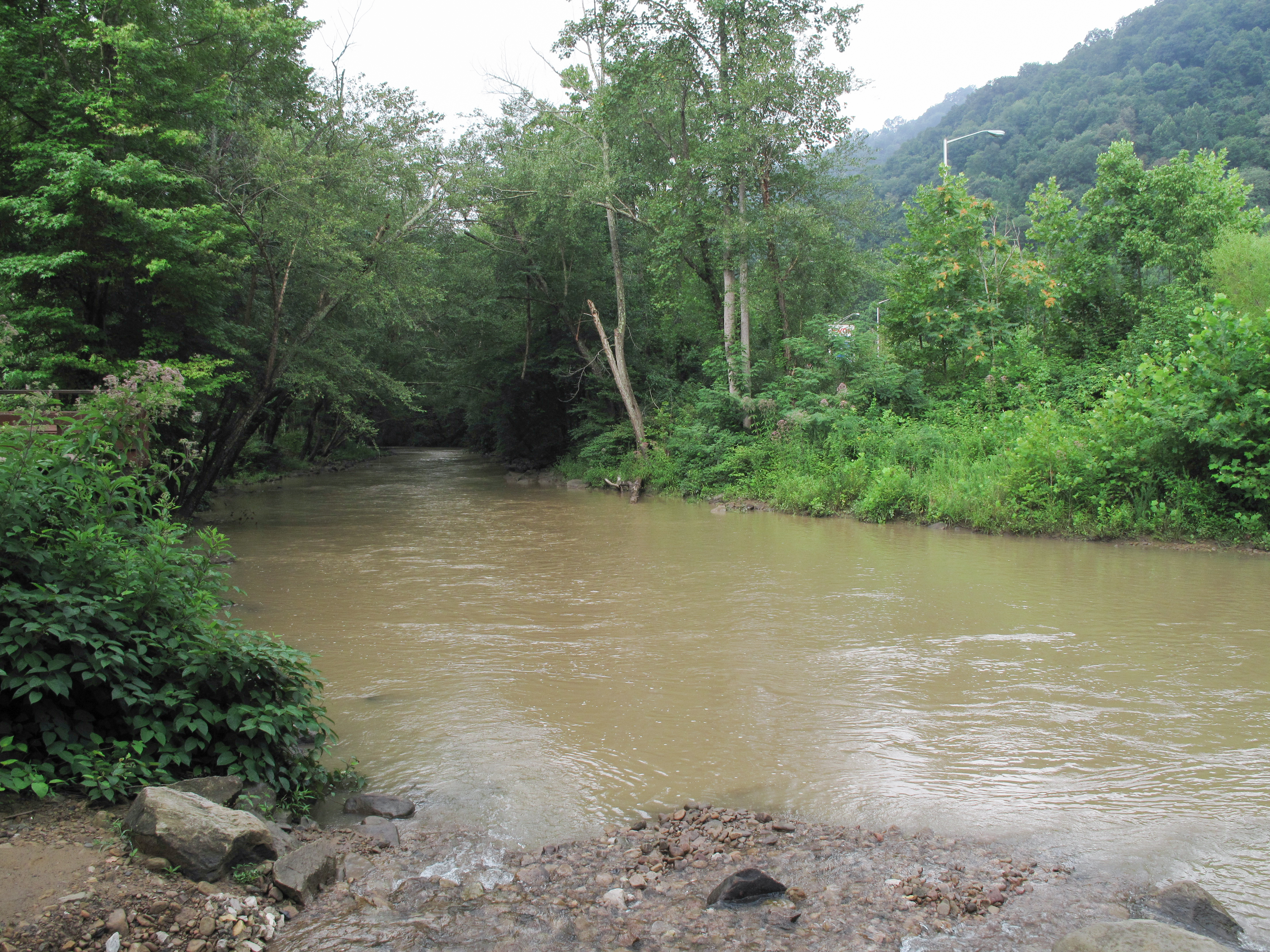
- Paint Creek in Ash Branch Park in Kanawha County

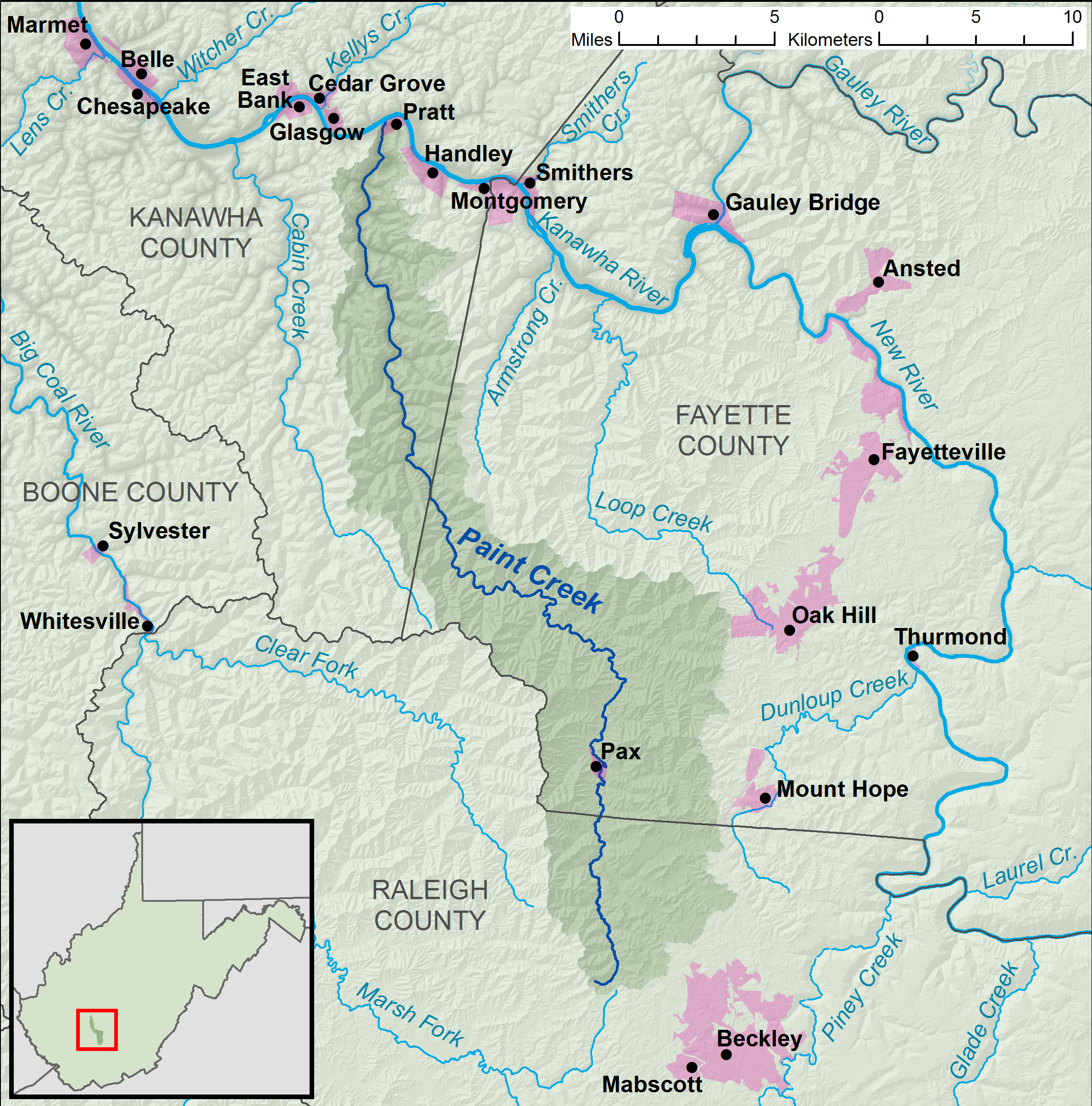
- A map of Paint Creek and its watershed

Location
- Country: United States
- State: West Virginia
- Counties: Raleigh, Fayette, Kanawha

Physical characteristics
- Source
  - location: northern Raleigh County
  - coordinates: 37°48′32″N 81°16′10″W
  - elevation: 2,322 ft (708 m)
- Mouth: Kanawha River
  - location: Hansford
  - coordinates: 38°12′34″N 81°23′30″W
  - elevation: 604 ft (184 m)
- Length: 42.1 mi (67.8 km)
- Basin size: 123 sq mi (320 km^{2})

Basin features
- Tributaries
  - left: Skitter Creek

Paint Creek is a 42.1-mile (67.8 km) tributary of the Kanawha River in southern West Virginia. Paint Creek is part of the Mississippi River watershed via the Kanawha and Ohio Rivers and drains an area of 123 square miles (320 km^{2}).

Paint Creek rises in north central Raleigh County and flows along County Route 7 north through Sweeneyburg and Maynor. At Maynor, the creek continues north along the West Virginia Turnpike. The creek follows the turnpike north into Fayette County, where it runs through the communities of Willis Branch, Pax, Long Branch, and Lively before curving to the northwest. Past Mossy and East Kingston, the creek briefly turns away from the highway before following it through Westerly, Milburn, Coalfield, Mahan, and Collinsdale. The creek then enters Kanawha County, where it heads north through Burnwell, Greencastle, and Whittaker. At Standard, Paint Creek Road turns away from the turnpike to follow County Route 83 (Paint Creek Road) north through Livingston and Gallagher. The creek flows north through Hollygrove before reaching its mouth at the Kanawha River in Hansford.

Paint Creek was named for the fact Indians blazed trees using natural paint.

== See also ==
- List of rivers of West Virginia
- Paint Creek–Cabin Creek strike of 1912
