= 1937 Michigan Wolverines football team =

American college football season

1937 Michigan Wolverines football
- Conference: Big Ten Conference
- Record: 4–4 (3–3 Big Ten)
- Head coach: Harry Kipke (9th season)
- MVP: Ralph Heikkinen
- Captain: Joe Rinaldi
- Home stadium: Michigan Stadium

1937 Big Ten Conference football standings
	Conf.					Overall
Team	W		L		T	W		L		T
No. 5 Minnesota $	5	–	0	–	0	6	–	2	–	0
No. 13 Ohio State	5	–	1	–	0	6	–	2	–	0
Indiana	3	–	2	–	0	5	–	3	–	0
Michigan	3	–	3	–	0	4	–	4	–	0
Northwestern	3	–	3	–	0	4	–	4	–	0
Purdue	2	–	2	–	1	4	–	3	–	1
Wisconsin	2	–	2	–	1	4	–	3	–	1
Illinois	2	–	3	–	0	3	–	3	–	2
Chicago	0	–	4	–	0	1	–	6	–	0
Iowa	0	–	5	–	0	1	–	7	–	0
$ – Conference champion; Rankings from AP Poll

The 1937 Michigan Wolverines football team was an American football team that represented the University of Michigan in the 1937 Big Ten Conference football season. In their ninth season under head coach Harry Kipke, the Wolverines compiled a 4–4 record (3–3 against Big Ten opponents) and tied for fourth place in the Big Ten. Kipke was fired after the season, having compiled a 46–26–4 record in nine years as Michigan's head coach.

After losing its first three games, the team won four consecutive games before losing to Ohio State in the final game of the season. The team was outscored by a combined total of 110 to 54, ranking 106th of 126 teams in major college football with an average of 6.8 points scored per game.

Guard Ralph Heikkinen was named the team's most valuable player and also received first-team honors on the 1937 All-Big Ten Conference football team. Center Joe Rinaldi was the team captain.

== Schedule ==
Date	Opponent	Site	Result	Attendance
October 2	Michigan State*	Michigan Stadium; Ann Arbor, MI (rivalry)	L 14–19	63,311
October 9	at Northwestern	Dyche Stadium; Evanston, IL (rivalry)	L 0–7	23,837
October 16	Minnesota^{†}	Michigan Stadium; Ann Arbor, MI (Little Brown Jug)	L 6–39	53,266
October 23	at Iowa	Iowa Stadium; Iowa City, IA	W 7–6	12,211
October 30	at Illinois	Memorial Stadium; Champaign, IL (rivalry)	W 7–6	32,506
November 6	Chicago	Michigan Stadium; Ann Arbor, MI (rivalry)	W 13–12	23,394
November 13	at Penn*	Franklin Field; Philadelphia, PA	W 7–0	18,476
November 20	No. 19 Ohio State	Michigan Stadium; Ann Arbor, MI (rivalry)	L 0–21	56,766
*Non-conference game; ^{†}Homecoming; Rankings from AP Poll released prior to the game

== Season summary ==
=== Pre-season ===
During the 1936 football season, Michigan compiled a 1–7 record (0–5 against conference opponents) and finished in last place in the Big Ten Conference. The team had compiled a 2–14 conference record since the 1933 season.

In December 1936, unhappiness with the team's performance was widespread, and the press reported that the school was intent on making sweeping changes and that chances were remote for the return of head coach Harry Kipke. In January 1937, in what was described in the press as "a compromise shakeup", the university fired Franklin Cappon as the team's line coach and assistant athletic director but retained Kipke as head coach for the 1937 season. The press reported that Kipke's retention was in part due to the failure to find a suitable replacement following a careful search. Cappon's dismissal was viewed as a victory for Kipke who had broken relations during the 1936 season. Bennie Oosterbaan and Wally Weber also retained their positions as assistant coaches responsible for the team's ends and backfield players.

The team filled out its coaching staff in February 1937, hiring Hunk Anderson as the line coach to replace Cappon.

=== Week 1: Michigan State ===
Week 1: Michigan State at Michigan

Team	1	2	3	4	Total
• Michigan State	0	0	13	6	19
Michigan	0	0	7	7	14

- Date: October 2
- Location: Michigan Stadium
- Game attendance: 71,200

On October 2, 1937, Michigan opened its season with a 19–14 loss to Michigan State in front of a crowd of 71,200 at Michigan Stadium. The defeat was the fourth in a row for Michigan against Charlie Bachman's Spartans – the first time in Michigan football history that any team had secured four consecutive victories over the Wolverines. After a scoreless first half, the Spartans scored three touchdowns in the second half, led by halfback John Pingel who threw two touchdown passes to Ole Nelson. Michigan State's Gene Ciolek also scored on an 89-yard run. For the Wolverines, Hercules Renda caught a touchdown pass from Stark Ritchie, and Fred Trosko scored on a run through center from inside the one-yard line. Trosko also kicked two points after touchdown.

=== Week 2: at Northwestern ===
Week 2: Michigan at Northwestern

Team	1	2	3	4	Total
Michigan	0	0	0	0	0
• Northwestern	0	0	7	0	7

- Date: October 9
- Location: Dyche Stadium, Evanston, IL
- Game attendance: 23,837

On October 9, 1937, Michigan lost to Northwestern, winner of the 1936 Big Ten championship, by a 7–0 score at Dyche Stadium in Evanston, Illinois. Despite the defeat, Michigan tackle Don Siegel was credited with completely stopping Northwestern's rushing attack on the left side to the point that Northwestern ceased running to his side after the first quarter. After a scoreless first half, Northwestern capitalized after intercepting a Douglas Farmer pass near midfield in the third quarter. The Wildcats scored on a 15-yard pass from Don Heap to Cleo Diehl. The Wolverines out-gained the Wildcats on the ground by 125 rushing yards to 106, but the Wildcats exceeded the Wolverines in the air by a margin of 128 passing yards to 70.

=== Week 3: Minnesota ===
Week 3: Minnesota at Michigan

Team	1	2	3	4	Total
• Minnesota	0	13	13	13	39
Michigan	6	0	0	0	6

- Date: October 16
- Location: Michigan Stadium
- Game attendance: 53,266

On October 16, 1937, in the annual Little Brown Jug rivalry game, Michigan lost to Bernie Bierman's Minnesota Golden Gophers by a 39–6 score before approximately 70,000 spectators at Michigan Stadium. The Wolverines took a 6–0 lead in the first quarter on a four-yard touchdown pass from Fred Trosko to Elmer Gedeon, the Wolverines' first touchdown against Minnesota since 1931. From that point forward, Minnesota responded with 39 unanswered points and intercepted six Michigan passes. Minnesota out-gained Michigan by a total of 389 yards to 31 yards. The loss was Michigan's fourth in a row against Minnesota. Minnesota star halfback Andy Uram sustained a broken wrist in the game. The 1937 Golden Gophers went on to win the Big Ten championship and were ranked No. 5 in the final AP Poll.

=== Week 4: at Iowa ===
Week 4: Michigan at Iowa

Team	1	2	3	4	Total
• Michigan	0	7	0	0	7
Iowa	0	0	6	0	6

- Date: October 23
- Location: Iowa Stadium, Iowa City, IA
- Game attendance: 12,211

On October 23, 1937, Michigan defeated Iowa, 7–6, before a crowd of approximately 20,000 in Iowa City. The victory was the first for Michigan over a Big Ten opponent since 1935. Tex Stanton scored Michigan's touchdown on a three-yard run in the second quarter. Fred Trosko kicked the point after touchdown. Iowa quarterback Nile Kinnick, who went on to win the 1939 Heisman Trophy, returned a punt 76 yards for a touchdown in the third quarter. Michigan tackle Bill Smith blocked Kinnick's kick for the point after touchdown to preserve Michigan's lead. The Wolverines out-gained the Hawkeyes by 180 yards to 106 yards.

=== Week 5: at Illinois ===
Week 5: Michigan at Illinois

Team	1	2	3	4	Total
• Michigan	0	0	7	0	7
Illinois	0	0	6	0	6

- Date: October 30
- Location: Memorial Stadium, Champaign, IL
- Game attendance: 32,506

On October 30, 1937, Michigan defeated Illinois by a 7–6 score before a crowd of approximately 29,000 at Memorial Stadium in Champaign, Illinois. After a scoreless first half, the Illini took a 6–0 lead in the third quarter as Willard Cramer recovered a fumble in Michigan's end zone for a touchdown. However, the kick for extra point was low. Shortly thereafter, Michigan quarterback Bill Barclay intercepted a Minnesota pass near midfield. After moving the ball to Illinois' 36-yard line, Fred Trosko threw a pass caught by a wide-open John Nicholson at the 15-yard line. Nicholson ran the remaining 15 yards untouched for a touchdown. Trosko converted the kick for point after touchdown to give the Wolverines a 7–6 lead. Michigan played well on defense, holding the Illini to only 56 total yards from scrimmage. The game was Illinois' homecoming game and included a celebration in honor of Robert Zuppke's 25th anniversary as the team's football coach.

=== Week 6: Chicago ===
Week 6: Chicago at Michigan

Team	1	2	3	4	Total
Chicago	0	6	6	0	12
• Michigan	0	0	0	13	13

- Date: November 6
- Location: Michigan Stadium
- Game attendance: 23,394

On November 6, 1937, Michigan defeated the Chicago Maroons, 13–12, before a crowd of approximately 20,000 at Michigan Stadium. Chicago scored touchdowns in the second and third quarters to take a 12–0 lead. With four minutes remaining in the game, the Wolverines rallied for two touchdowns. Stark Ritchie, who had just been brought into the game as a substitute, scored on a 41-yard sweep around the left side with a key block by Hercules Renda on Chicago's right end. Danny Smick kicked the extra point to narrow Chicago's lead to five points. On the ensuing drive, Smick hit the Chicago ball carrier at full speed; the ball came loose and Smick recovered the fumble at Chicago's 21-yard line with two minutes left in the game. A Chicago penalty advanced the ball to the 16-yard line, and Stark Ritchie then ran through the right end to the six-yard line. Chicago held on the next three plays, but Ritchie ran for the winning touchdown on fourth down. Michigan took the lead with one minute left to play. Smick's kick for extra point was unsuccessful. Ralph Heikkinen intercepted a Chicago pass at midfield as time ran out.

=== Week 7: at Penn ===
Week 7: Michigan at Penn

Team	1	2	3	4	Total
• Michigan	0	7	0	0	7
Penn	0	0	0	0	0

- Date: November 13
- Location: Franklin Field, Philadelphia
- Game attendance: 18,476

On November 13, 1937, Michigan won its fourth consecutive game, defeating Penn by a 7–0 score on a wet, muddy Franklin Field in Philadelphia. Michigan scored with a minute and 20 seconds remaining in the first half on a six-yard touchdown pass from Stark Ritchie to Norm Purucker. Guard George Marzonie kicked the extra point. The touchdown was set up when Ralph Heikkinen recovered a fumbled forward lateral. A Penn player, Walter Shinn, threw a punch at Michigan end John Nicholson during the scrum for the loose ball, resulting in Shinn's ejection and a penalty that moved the ball to the Penn 33-yard line. Penn out-gained Michigan in the game by a total of 94 yards to 74 yards. After the game, a small contingent of Michigan fans attempted unsuccessfully to tear down the goalpost, but their effort was thwarted by a much larger group of Penn students.

=== Week 8: Ohio State ===
Week 8: Ohio State at Michigan

Team	1	2	3	4	Total
• Ohio State	0	9	6	6	21
Michigan	0	0	0	0	0

- Date: November 20
- Location: Michigan Stadium
- Game attendance: 56,766

On November 20, 1937, Michigan concluded its season with its annual rivalry game against an Ohio State team ranked No. 13 in the AP Poll. The game was played in the snow before a crowd of approximately 60,000 at Michigan Stadium. Ohio State dominated the game and won by a 21–0 score. Ohio State touchdowns were scored by Miller (two) and Nardi (one); the Buckeyes also scored two points on a safety in the second quarter. The Buckeyes out-gained the Wolverines by 225 rushing yards to 63 and by 101 passing yards to 37. The defeat was the fourth in a row to the Buckeyes. Prior to the 1937 season, Michigan had not lost four consecutive games to any opponents, but the 1937 season brought the team's fourth consecutive losses against all three major rivals – Michigan State, Minnesota, and Ohio State.

=== Post-season ===
On November 23, 1937, the Michigan football team elected tackle Fred Janke as captain of the 1938 team. At the same time, guard Ralph Heikkinen was selected as the most valuable player on the 1937 squad.

Heikkinen was also the only Michigan player to receive first-team honors on the 1937 All-Big Ten Conference football team. He was selected as a first-team tackle by the United Press and received second-team honors from the Associated Press. Tackle Don Siegel also received second-team honors from the Associated Press.

Harry Kipke was fired as Michigan's head coach on December 9, 1937. According to newspaper reports, Kipke was "on the outs" with athletic director Fielding H. Yost, and the Board in Control of Physical Education had come to the unanimous opinion that Kipke was "incompetent".

Candidates to replace Kipke included Gus Dorais, George Veenker, Gar Davidson, Dutch Clark, Howard Jones, and Ivy Williamson. Fritz Crisler was ultimately hired in February 1938 as Kipke's replacement.

== Players ==
=== Varsity letter winners ===
The following 26 players received varsity letters for their participation on the 1937 Michigan football team. For players who were starters, the list also includes the number of games started by position. Players who started at least half of Michigan's games are shown in bold.

- Bill Barclay, quarterback, senior, Flint, Michigan – started 3 games at right halfback
- **John Brennan**, guard, junior, Racine, Wisconsin – started 7 games at left guard
- Robert D. Campbell, halfback, senior, Ionia, Michigan
- **Douglas Farmer**, fullback, senior, Hinsdale, Illinois – started 8 games at quarterback
- Elmer Gedeon, end, junior, Cleveland, Ohio – started 2 games at left end
- **Ralph Heikkinen**, guard, junior, Ramsay, Michigan – started 7 games at right guard
- Fred Janke, fullback, junior, Jackson, Michigan – started 2 games at left tackle
- **Archie Kodros**, center/guard, sophomore, Alton, Illinois – started 7 games at center
- Louis Levine, quarterback, junior, Muskegon Heights, Michigan
- Earl B. Luby, tackle, senior, Chicago, Illinois
- George A. Marzonie, guard, senior, Flint, Michigan – started 1 game at right guard
- **John E. Nicholson, Jr.**, end, junior, Elkhart, Indiana – started 6 games at left end, 1 game at right end
- Frederick C. "Fred" Olds, guard/tackle, junior, East Lansing, Michigan – started 1 game at left guard
- Ernest A. Pederson, guard, senior, Grand Blanc, Michigan
- Norm Purucker, halfback, Poland, Ohio – started 1 game at right halfback
- Hercules Renda, halfback, sophomore, Jochin, West Virginia – started 3 games at right halfback
- **Joseph M. Rinaldi**, center, senior, Elkhart, Indiana – started 8 games at center
- **Stark Ritchie**, halfback, senior, Battle Creek, Michigan – started 1 game at center; 3 games at left halfback
- Roland Savilla, tackle, sophomore, Gallagher, West Virginia – started 2 games at right tackle
- **Donald J. Siegel**, tackle, junior, Royal Oak, Michigan – started 6 games at left tackle
- **Danny Smick**, end, junior, Hazel Park, Michigan – started 6 games at right end
- **William A. Smith**, tackle, sophomore, Riverside, California – started 6 games at right tackle
- **Edward Stanton**, fullback, junior, Charleston, West Virginia – started 7 games at fullback
- **Fred Trosko**, halfback, sophomore, Flint, Michigan – started 5 games at left halfback
- Arthur Valpey, end, senior, Detroit – started 1 game at right end
- Clarence H. Vandewater, guard, junior, Holland, Michigan

=== Varsity reserve ===
The following players were identified as varsity reserves on the roster of the 1937 Michigan football team.

- Harold Floersch, end, junior, Wyandotte, Michigan
- R. Wallace Hook, Jr., halfback, junior, East Grand Rapids, Michigan
- John H. Kinsey, fullback, sophomore, Plymouth, Michigan – started 1 game at fullback
- Dennis A. Kuhn, tackle, sophomore, River Rouge, Michigan
- Derwood D. Laskey, halfback, sophomore, Milan, Michigan
- Harry K. Mulholland, fullback, sophomore, Bay City, Michigan
- Norman J. Nickerson, fullback, junior, Detroit, Michigan
- Robert P. Piotrowski, halfback, junior, Manistee, Michigan
- Joseph C. Rogers, end, sophomore, Royal Oak, Michigan
- Horace Tinker, center, sophomore, Battle Creek, Michigan
- Frederick C. Ziem, guard, senior, Pontiac, Michigan

=== All-freshman team ===
The 1937 all-freshman team included a nucleus of players, including Tom Harmon and Forest Evashevski, that would propel Michigan to the top tier of college football programs when Fritz Crisler took over as head coach in 1938.

- Pierce Barker, Detroit, Michigan
- Richard C. Bennett, Springfield, Illinois
- Irwin S. Clamage, Detroit, Michigan
- George L. Clark, Carthage, Illinois
- Edward W. Czak, Elyria, Ohio
- Forest Evashevski, Detroit, Michigan
- Thomas G. Ford, East Grand Rapids, Michigan
- Harlin E. Fraumann, Pontiac, Michigan
- Ralph Fritz, New Kensington, Pennsylvania
- William H. Gambill, Centralia, Illinois
- Jack D. Grant, Chicago, Illinois
- Tom Harmon, Gary, Indiana
- William J. Hermann, Detroit, Michigan
- Robert Horst, Detroit, Michigan
- Reuben Kelto, Bessemer, Michigan
- Thomas P. Kieckhefer, Milwaukee, Wisconsin
- Harry E. Kohl, Dayton, Ohio
- Paul Kromer, Lorain, Ohio
- Robert E. Larkin, Oak Park, Illinois
- Blaz A. Lucas, Jr., Gary, Indiana
- George S. Manolakas, Detroit, Michigan
- Howard H. Mehaffey, Pittsburgh, Pennsylvania
- Jack Meyer, Elyria, Ohio
- James R. Miller, Highland Park, Michigan
- Charles E. Norton, Lawrenceburg, Tennessee
- Arthur Paddy, Benton Harbor, Michigan
- Lester Persky, Cleveland Heights, Ohio
- Richard G. Pugh, Detroit, Michigan
- Charles R. Ross, Cambridge, Massachusetts
- Robert S. Ross, Menasha, Wisconsin
- Melvin S. Schlemenson, Memphis, Tennessee
- Robert M. Seltzer, Chicago, Illinois
- Edward Shelberg, Lansing, Michigan
- Jacob Speelman, Jr., Lansing, Michigan
- Dave Strong, Helena, Montana
- George S. Thomas, Detroit, Michigan
- William E. Vollmer, Manistee, Michigan
- Colin C. Weymouth, Detroit, Michigan

== Awards and honors ==
- Captain: Joe Rinaldi
- All-Conference: Ralph Heikkinen (AP-2, UP-1); Don Siegel (AP-2)
- Most Valuable Player: Ralph Heikkinen
- Meyer Morton Award: Fred Trosko

== Coaching staff ==
- Head coach: Harry Kipke
- Assistant coaches

- Backfield coach: Wally Weber
- Line coach: Hunk Anderson
- End coach: Bennie Oosterbaan

- Trainer: Ray Roberts
- Manager: Fred Colombo, assisted by John Fecknay, Ralph Dubois, Warren Slater, Philip Woodworth
