= 1937 Iowa Hawkeyes football team =

American college football season

1937 Iowa Hawkeyes football
- Conference: Big Ten Conference
- Record: 1–7 (0–5 Big Ten)
- Head coach: Irl Tubbs (1st season)
- MVP: Bob Lannon
- Captain: Homer Harris
- Home stadium: Iowa Stadium

1937 Big Ten Conference football standings
	Conf.					Overall
Team	W		L		T	W		L		T
No. 5 Minnesota $	5	–	0	–	0	6	–	2	–	0
No. 13 Ohio State	5	–	1	–	0	6	–	2	–	0
Indiana	3	–	2	–	0	5	–	3	–	0
Michigan	3	–	3	–	0	4	–	4	–	0
Northwestern	3	–	3	–	0	4	–	4	–	0
Purdue	2	–	2	–	1	4	–	3	–	1
Wisconsin	2	–	2	–	1	4	–	3	–	1
Illinois	2	–	3	–	0	3	–	3	–	2
Chicago	0	–	4	–	0	1	–	6	–	0
Iowa	0	–	5	–	0	1	–	7	–	0
$ – Conference champion; Rankings from AP Poll

The 1937 Iowa Hawkeyes football team was an American football team that represented the University of Iowa as a member of the Big Ten Conference during the 1937 Big Ten football season. In their first season under head coach Irl Tubbs, the Hawkeyes compiled a 1–7 record (0–5 in conference games), finished in last place in the Big Ten, and was outscored by a total of 120 to 36.

Homer Harris was the team captain. End Bob Lannon was selected as the most valuable player; he also received first-team honors from th Associated Press on the 1937 All-Big Ten Conference football team. Halfback Nile Kinnick received first-team All-Big Ten honors from th United Press.

The team played its home games at Iowa Stadium (later renamed Kinnick Stadium) in Iowa City, Iowa.

== Schedule ==
Date	Opponent	Site	Result	Attendance	Source
September 25	at Washington*	Husky Stadium; Seattle, WA	L 0–14	18,533	
October 9	Bradley Tech*	Iowa Stadium; Iowa City, IA	W 14–7		
October 16	at Wisconsin	Camp Randall Stadium; Madison, WI (rivalry)	L 6–13		
October 23	Michigan	Iowa Stadium; Iowa City, IA	L 6–7	12,211	
October 30	at Purdue	Ross–Ade Stadium; West Lafayette, IN	L 0–13	20,000	
November 6	No. 14 Minnesota^{†}	Iowa Stadium; Iowa City, IA (rivalry)	L 10–35	40,000	
November 13	No. 17 Indiana	Iowa Stadium; Iowa City, IA	L 0–3		
November 20	at No. 11 Nebraska*	Memorial Stadium; Lincoln, NE (rivalry)	L 0–28		
*Non-conference game; ^{†}Homecoming; Rankings from AP Poll released prior to the game
