= Maynor =

Maynor may refer to:

Surname

- Eric Maynor, American basketball player
- Connell Maynor, American football player and coach
- Dorothy Maynor, American soprano
- Eugene Maynor, American coach
- Helen Maynor Scheirbeck, Native American educator and activist
- Jordan Maynor, American politician
- Kevin Maynor, American opera singer

Given name

- Maynor Figueroa, Honduran footballer
- Maynor Suazo, Honduran footballer
- Maynor Dávila, Guatemalan footballer

Places

- Maynor, West Virginia
