= 1937 Northwestern Wildcats football team =

American college football season

1937 Northwestern Wildcats football
- Conference: Big Ten Conference
- Record: 4–4 (3–3 Big Ten)
- Head coach: Pappy Waldorf (3rd season)
- Offensive scheme: Single-wing
- MVP: Don Heap
- Captain: Don Heap
- Home stadium: Dyche Stadium

1937 Big Ten Conference football standings
	Conf.					Overall
Team	W		L		T	W		L		T
No. 5 Minnesota $	5	–	0	–	0	6	–	2	–	0
No. 13 Ohio State	5	–	1	–	0	6	–	2	–	0
Indiana	3	–	2	–	0	5	–	3	–	0
Michigan	3	–	3	–	0	4	–	4	–	0
Northwestern	3	–	3	–	0	4	–	4	–	0
Purdue	2	–	2	–	1	4	–	3	–	1
Wisconsin	2	–	2	–	1	4	–	3	–	1
Illinois	2	–	3	–	0	3	–	3	–	2
Chicago	0	–	4	–	0	1	–	6	–	0
Iowa	0	–	5	–	0	1	–	7	–	0
$ – Conference champion; Rankings from AP Poll

The 1937 Northwestern Wildcats team represented Northwestern University during the 1937 Big Ten Conference football season. In their fifth year under head coach Pappy Waldorf, the Wildcats compiled a 4–4 record (3–3 against Big Ten Conference opponents) and finished in a tie for fourth place in the Big Ten Conference.

== Schedule ==
Date	Opponent	Rank	Site	Result	Attendance	Source
October 2	Iowa State*		Dyche Stadium; Evanston, IL	W 33–0	37,673	
October 9	Michigan		Dyche Stadium; Evanston, IL (rivalry)	W 7–0	23,837–32,000	
October 16	Purdue		Dyche Stadium; Evanston, IL	W 14–7	35,000	
October 23	at No. 12 Ohio State	No. 7	Ohio Stadium; Columbus, OH	L 0–7	67,521	
October 30	at Wisconsin		Camp Randall Stadium; Madison, WI	W 14–6		
November 6	Illinois	No. 19	Dyche Stadium; Evanston, IL (rivalry)	L 0–6	42,000	
November 13	at No. 10 Minnesota		Memorial Stadium; Minneapolis, MN	L 0–7	63,000	
November 20	No. 12 Notre Dame*		Dyche Stadium; Evanston, IL (rivalry)	L 0–7	42,573–45,000	
*Non-conference game; Rankings from AP Poll released prior to the game
