= 1937 Ohio State Buckeyes football team =

American college football season

1937 Ohio State Buckeyes football
- Conference: Big Ten Conference

Ranking
- AP: No. 13
- Record: 6–2 (5–1 Big Ten)
- Head coach: Francis Schmidt (4th season)
- MVP: Ralph Wolf
- Home stadium: Ohio Stadium

1937 Big Ten Conference football standings
	Conf.					Overall
Team	W		L		T	W		L		T
No. 5 Minnesota $	5	–	0	–	0	6	–	2	–	0
No. 13 Ohio State	5	–	1	–	0	6	–	2	–	0
Indiana	3	–	2	–	0	5	–	3	–	0
Michigan	3	–	3	–	0	4	–	4	–	0
Northwestern	3	–	3	–	0	4	–	4	–	0
Purdue	2	–	2	–	1	4	–	3	–	1
Wisconsin	2	–	2	–	1	4	–	3	–	1
Illinois	2	–	3	–	0	3	–	3	–	2
Chicago	0	–	4	–	0	1	–	6	–	0
Iowa	0	–	5	–	0	1	–	7	–	0
$ – Conference champion; Rankings from AP Poll

The 1937 Ohio State Buckeyes football team represented Ohio State University in the 1937 Big Ten Conference football season. The Buckeyes compiled a 6–2 record and outscored opponents 125–23.

== Schedule ==
Date	Opponent	Rank	Site	Result	Attendance	Source
September 25	TCU*		Ohio Stadium; Columbus, OH	W 14–0	68,291	
October 2	Purdue		Ohio Stadium; Columbus, OH	W 13–0	49,643	
October 9	at USC*		Los Angeles Memorial Coliseum; Los Angeles, CA	L 12–13	65,000	
October 23	No. 7 Northwestern	No. 12	Ohio Stadium; Columbus, OH	W 7–0	67,521	
October 30	at Chicago	No. 8	Stagg Field; Chicago, IL	W 39–0	10,000	
November 6	Indiana	No. 8	Ohio Stadium; Columbus, OH	L 0–10	47,056	
November 13	Illinois		Ohio Stadium; Columbus, OH (Illibuck)	W 19–0	41,921	
November 20	at Michigan	No. 19	Michigan Stadium; Ann Arbor, MI (rivalry)	W 21–0	56,766	
*Non-conference game; Rankings from AP Poll released prior to the game

== Coaching staff ==
- Francis Schmidt, head coach, fourth year

== 1938 NFL draftees ==
Player	Round	Pick	Position	NFL club
Jim A. McDonald	1	2	Back	Philadelphia Eagles
Gust Zarnas	5	40	Guard	Chicago Bears
Dick Nardi	8	66	Back	Detroit Lions
Charles Ream	9	71	Tackle	Cleveland Rams
Ralph Wolf	10	86	Center	Detroit Lions
