= 1937 Wisconsin Badgers football team =

American college football season

1937 Wisconsin Badgers football
- Conference: Big Ten Conference
- Record: 4–3–1 (2–2–1 Big Ten)
- Head coach: Harry Stuhldreher (2nd season)
- MVP: Howard Weiss
- Captain: Fred Benz
- Home stadium: Camp Randall Stadium

1937 Big Ten Conference football standings
	Conf.					Overall
Team	W		L		T	W		L		T
No. 5 Minnesota $	5	–	0	–	0	6	–	2	–	0
No. 13 Ohio State	5	–	1	–	0	6	–	2	–	0
Indiana	3	–	2	–	0	5	–	3	–	0
Michigan	3	–	3	–	0	4	–	4	–	0
Northwestern	3	–	3	–	0	4	–	4	–	0
Purdue	2	–	2	–	1	4	–	3	–	1
Wisconsin	2	–	2	–	1	4	–	3	–	1
Illinois	2	–	3	–	0	3	–	3	–	2
Chicago	0	–	4	–	0	1	–	6	–	0
Iowa	0	–	5	–	0	1	–	7	–	0
$ – Conference champion; Rankings from AP Poll

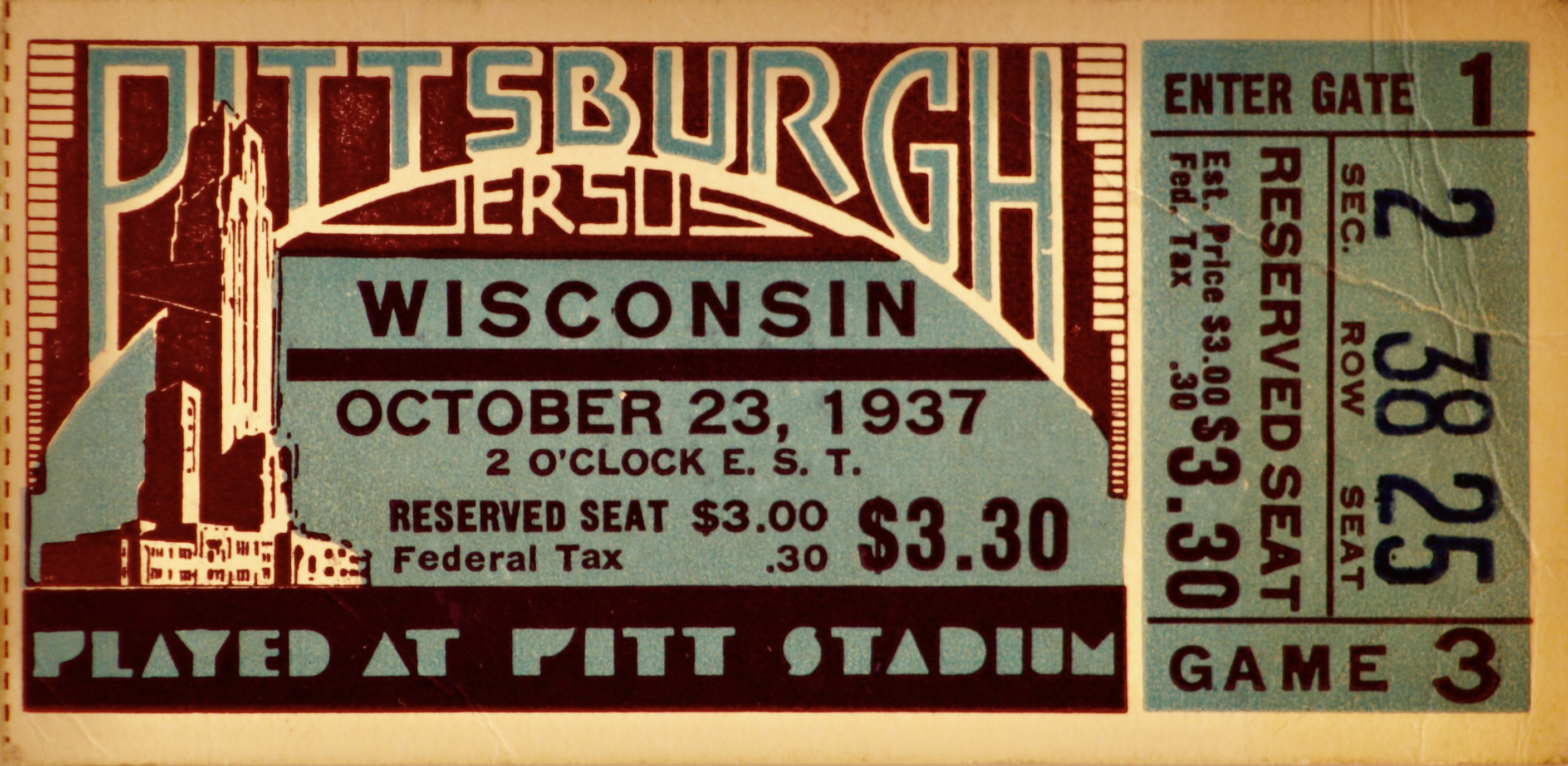
October 23, 1937 ticket stub for the Wisconsin versus Pittsburgh football game

The 1937 Wisconsin Badgers football team was an American football team that represented the University of Wisconsin in the 1937 Big Ten Conference football season. The team compiled a 4–3–1 record (2–2–1 against conference opponents) and finished in a tie for sixth place in the Big Ten Conference. Harry Stuhldreher was in his second year as Wisconsin's head coach.

Fullback Howard Weiss was selected as the team's most valuable player. End Fred Benz was the team captain. Benz and halfback Bill Schmitz were selected as second-team All-Big Ten players by the Associated Press and United Press, respectively.

The team played its home games at Camp Randall Stadium, which had a capacity of 36,000. During the 1937 season, the average attendance at home games was 24,121.

== Schedule ==
Date	Opponent	Rank	Site	Result	Attendance	Source
September 25	South Dakota State*		Camp Randall Stadium; Madison, WI	W 32–0		
October 2	Marquette*		Camp Randall Stadium; Madison, WI	W 12–0	30,942	
October 9	at Chicago		Stagg Field; Chicago, IL	W 27–0	12,000	
October 16	Iowa^{†}		Camp Randall Stadium; Madison, WI (rivalry)	W 13–6		
October 23	at No. 3 Pittsburgh*	No. 16	Pitt Stadium; Pittsburgh, PA	L 0–21		
October 30	Northwestern		Camp Randall Stadium; Madison, WI	L 6–14		
November 13	Purdue		Camp Randall Stadium; Madison, WI	T 7–7	23,000	
November 20	at No. 7 Minnesota		Memorial Stadium; Minneapolis, MN (rivalry)	L 6–13	46,000	
*Non-conference game; ^{†}Homecoming; Rankings from AP Poll released prior to the game
