= 1937 Indiana Hoosiers football team =

American college football season

1937 Indiana Hoosiers football
- Conference: Big Ten Conference
- Record: 5–3 (3–2 Big Ten)
- Head coach: Bo McMillin (4th season)
- MVP: Corbett Davis
- Captain: Robert Kinderdine
- Home stadium: Memorial Stadium

1937 Big Ten Conference football standings
	Conf.					Overall
Team	W		L		T	W		L		T
No. 5 Minnesota $	5	–	0	–	0	6	–	2	–	0
No. 13 Ohio State	5	–	1	–	0	6	–	2	–	0
Indiana	3	–	2	–	0	5	–	3	–	0
Michigan	3	–	3	–	0	4	–	4	–	0
Northwestern	3	–	3	–	0	4	–	4	–	0
Purdue	2	–	2	–	1	4	–	3	–	1
Wisconsin	2	–	2	–	1	4	–	3	–	1
Illinois	2	–	3	–	0	3	–	3	–	2
Chicago	0	–	4	–	0	1	–	6	–	0
Iowa	0	–	5	–	0	1	–	7	–	0
$ – Conference champion; Rankings from AP Poll

The 1937 Indiana Hoosiers football team represented the Indiana Hoosiers in the 1937 Big Ten Conference football season. The Hoosiers played their home games at Memorial Stadium in Bloomington, Indiana. The team was coached by Bo McMillin, in his fourth year as head coach of the Hoosiers. Corbett Davis was selected as the team's most valuable player and also won the Chicago Tribune Silver Football as the most valuable player in the Big Ten Conference.

== Schedule ==
Date	Time	Opponent	Rank	Site	Result	Attendance	Source
September 25	2:00 p.m,	Centre		Memorial Stadium; Bloomington, IN	W 12–0	10,000	
October 9		at Minnesota		Memorial Stadium; Minneapolis, MN	L 0–6	35,000	
October 16		Illinois		Memorial Stadium; Bloomington, IN (rivalry)	W 13–6	17,000	
October 23		Cincinnati*		Memorial Stadium; Bloomington, IN	W 27–0		
October 30		at No. 11 Nebraska*		Memorial Stadium; Lincoln, NE	L 0–7		
November 6		at No. 8 Ohio State		Ohio Stadium; Columbus, OH	W 10–0	47,056	
November 13		at Iowa	No. 17	Iowa Stadium; Iowa City, IA	W 3–0		
November 20		Purdue	No. 20	Memorial Stadium; Bloomington, IN (Old Oaken Bucket)	L 7–13	25,000	
*Non-conference game; Rankings from AP Poll released prior to the game; All times are in Central time

== 1938 NFL draftees ==
Player	Position	Round	Pick	NFL club
Corbett Davis	Back	1	1	Cleveland Rams
Frank Filchock	Back	2	14	Pittsburgh Pirates
Jim Sirtosky	Guard	9	76	Detroit Lions
Bob Kenderdine	End	11	95	Chicago Cardinals
