= Douglas Farmer =

American football player, medical doctor, and professor of medicine

- Portrait of Farmer from 1938 Michiganensian

Profile
- Position: Quarterback

Personal information
- Born: January 22, 1916
- Died: March 29, 1977 (aged 61); New Haven, Connecticut, U.S.
- Listed height: 6 ft 1 in (1.85 m)
- Listed weight: 182 lb (83 kg)

Career information
- High school: Hinsdale Central (Hinsdale, Illinois)
- College: University of Michigan, Harvard Medical School

Career history
- 1935–1937: Michigan

Douglas Alexander Farmer (January 22, 1916 – March 29, 1977) was an American football player, medical doctor, and professor of medicine. He was a quarterback for the University of Michigan football team, attended Harvard Medical School, and later served as a professor of medicine at Harvard University, Boston University, and the Yale School of Medicine and as chief of the department of surgery at the Hospital of Saint Raphael.

== Early life ==
Farmer was born in 1916 in Winnipeg, Manitoba, Canada. His parents were Frank Harvey Farmer and Amelia "Millie" Farmer. As a boy, he moved with his family to Chippewa, Ontario. He then immigrated to the United States at Niagara Falls, New York, in 1924. He attended high school in Hinsdale, Illinois.

== University of Michigan ==
Farmer attended the University of Michigan and received his undergraduate degree there in 1938. He played college football at Michigan from 1935 to 1937. He started all eight games as the quarterback of the 1937 Michigan Wolverines football team.

While at Michigan, he was also a member and president of the Beta Theta Pi fraternity, president of the senior class (Class of 1938), and a member of the Sphinx and Michigamua. A profile of farmer in the 1938 University of Michigan yearbook described Farmer as follows: "Known by his fraternity brothers as 'Wife Beater,' by his friends as the 'Blooming Tory, and by practically ever woman on the campus as 'The Cutest Thing,' Doug Farmer is the man who called those forward passes on his own two-yard line last fall. ... Farmer is a very versatile guy. Intelligent, too. From something known as Hinsdale, Ill. 'Pretty Muscles' is still a cosmopolite. He walks down State Street just as if he were used to a big town."

== Medical career ==
After graduating from Michigan, Farmer attended Harvard Medical School. He graduated from medical school in 1942 and served in the United States Army Air Corps during World War II from 1942 to 1946. After the war, Farmer began practice as a surgeon in Boston. He was a professor of medicine at Boston University School of Medicine from 1954 to 1964 and later at Yale School of Medicine. He was also the chief of the department of surgery at the Hospital of Saint Raphael in New Haven, Connecticut. He wrote 23 scientific papers and was a diplomate of the American Board of Surgeons and a Fellow of the American College of Surgeons.

== Family and later years ==
Farmer and his wife, Elizabeth, had three sons (Douglas, James, and Jeffrey) and two daughters (Judith and Nancy). He lived in Madison, Connecticut in his later years. He died in March 1977 at the Hospital of St. Raphael.
