= Carl Kaplanoff =

American football player (1917–1991)

No. 15, 46
- Positions: Guard, tackle

Personal information
- Born: April 19, 1917; Toledo, Ohio, U.S.
- Died: June 6, 1991 (aged 74); Rancho Santa Fe, California, U.S.
- Listed height: 6 ft 0 in (1.83 m)
- Listed weight: 235 lb (107 kg)

Career information
- High school: Bucyrus (Bucyrus, Ohio)
- College: Ohio State (1935–1938)
- NFL draft: 1939: 12th round, 109th overall pick

Career history
- Brooklyn Dodgers (1939); Boston Bears (1940); San Diego Bombers (1941)

Awards and highlights
- First-team All-Big Ten (1937)
- Stats at Pro Football Reference

Carl George Kaplanoff (April 19, 1917 – June 6, 1991) was an American professional football guard and tackle who played one season with the Brooklyn Dodgers of the National Football League (NFL). He played college football at Ohio State.

== Early life and college ==
Carl George Kaplanoff was born on April 19, 1917, in April 19, 1917, in Toledo, Ohio. He attended Bucyrus High School in Bucyrus, Ohio.

Kaplanoff was a member of the Ohio State Buckeyes freshman team in 1935 and was a three-year letterman from 1936 to 1938. He was named first-team All-Big Ten by the United Press in 1937. He was a team captain in 1938.

== Professional career ==
Kaplanoff was selected by the Brooklyn Dodgers in the 12th round, with the 109th overall pick, of the 1939 NFL draft. He signed with the team on July 13, 1939. He played in all 11 games, starting six, for the Dodgers during the 1939 season. He was released in 1940.

Kaplanoff appeared in seven games, starting one, for the Boston Bears of the American Football League in 1940.

Kaplanoff started three games for the San Diego Bombers of the Pacific Coast Professional Football League in 1941. He then was drafted into the United States Army during World War II. He served in the Army for 28 years and retired as a lieutenant colonel.

== Personal life ==
Kaplanoff married Betty Jeanne Newell and had three daughters with her. He died on June 6, 1991, in Rancho Santa Fe, California.
