= 1937 Purdue Boilermakers football team =

American college football season

1937 Purdue Boilermakers football
- Conference: Big Ten Conference
- Record: 4–3–1 (2–2–1 Big Ten)
- Head coach: Mal Elward (1st season)
- MVP: Cecil Isbell
- Captain: Martin A. Schreyer
- Home stadium: Ross–Ade Stadium

1937 Big Ten Conference football standings
	Conf.					Overall
Team	W		L		T	W		L		T
No. 5 Minnesota $	5	–	0	–	0	6	–	2	–	0
No. 13 Ohio State	5	–	1	–	0	6	–	2	–	0
Indiana	3	–	2	–	0	5	–	3	–	0
Michigan	3	–	3	–	0	4	–	4	–	0
Northwestern	3	–	3	–	0	4	–	4	–	0
Purdue	2	–	2	–	1	4	–	3	–	1
Wisconsin	2	–	2	–	1	4	–	3	–	1
Illinois	2	–	3	–	0	3	–	3	–	2
Chicago	0	–	4	–	0	1	–	6	–	0
Iowa	0	–	5	–	0	1	–	7	–	0
$ – Conference champion; Rankings from AP Poll

The 1937 Purdue Boilermakers football team was an American football team that represented Purdue University during the 1937 Big Ten Conference football season. In their first season under head coach Mal Elward, the Boilermakers compiled a 4–3–1 record, finished in a tie for sixth place in the Big Ten Conference with a 2–2–1 record against conference opponents, and outscored opponents by a total of 83 to 69.

== Schedule ==
Date	Opponent	Site	Result	Attendance	Source
September 25	Butler*	Ross–Ade Stadium; West Lafayette, IN	W 33–7		
October 2	at Ohio State	Ohio Stadium; Columbus, OH	L 0–13	49,643	
October 9	Carnegie Tech*^{†}	Ross–Ade Stadium; West Lafayette, IN	W 7–0	20,000	
October 16	at Northwestern	Dyche Stadium; Evanston, IL	L 7–14	35,000	
October 30	Iowa	Ross–Ade Stadium; West Lafayette, IN	W 13–0	20,000	
November 6	at No. 5 Fordham*	Polo Grounds; New York, NY	L 3–21	40,000	
November 13	at Wisconsin	Camp Randall Stadium; Madison, WI	T 7–7	23,000	
November 20	at No. 20 Indiana	Memorial Stadium; Bloomington, IN (Old Oaken Bucket)	W 13–7	25,000	
*Non-conference game; ^{†}Homecoming; Rankings from AP Poll released prior to the game

== Roster ==
- Andy Botney, QB-E-HB
- Hank Bremer, G
- W. E. Britt, E
- Lou Brock, HB
- Jack Brown, HB
- Frank Bykowski, G
- Lowell Decker, FB-HB
- Leon DeWitte, FB
- Bob Faris, T
- J. P. Fitzgerald, T-E
- Andy Grant, G
- Ted Hennis, QB
- Paul Humphrey, C
- Cecil Isbell, HB
- Cody Isbell, E-C-HB
- LaVerne Johnson, G-T
- Tony Juska, FB
- Woodrow Knorr, G
- Harry Krause, T
- John Krause, E
- Jim Maloney, G
- Joe Mihal, T
- Augie Morningstar, C
- Jim Nesbitt, HB
- Basil Petry, C
- Donald Powell, E
- Martin Schreyer, C-T
- Robert Selby, HB
- Allen Shackleton, QB
- George Spehn, E
- John Thursby, E
- Bill Vergane, E-T
- Carl Verplank, G
- Frank Winchell, G
- Clem Woltman, T
- Jim Zachary, E
