= Clem Woltman =

American football player (1914–1988)

No. 15
- Position: Tackle

Personal information
- Born: December 4, 1914; South Bend, Indiana, U.S.
- Died: January 16, 1988 (aged 73); Seminole County, Florida, U.S.
- Listed height: 6 ft 1 in (1.85 m)
- Listed weight: 214 lb (97 kg)

Career information
- College: Purdue
- NFL draft: 1938: 8th round, 62nd overall pick

Career history
- Philadelphia Eagles (1938–1940)

Awards and highlights
- Second-team All-Big Ten (1937)

Career NFL statistics
- Games played: 31
- Games started: 19
- Stats at Pro Football Reference

Clement J. Woltman (December 4, 1914 – January 16, 1988) was an American professional football player who was a tackle for the Philadelphia Eagles of the National Football League (NFL) for three seasons from 1938 to 1940. He played high school football for South Bend Central High School in Indiana. He played college football for the Purdue Boilermakers where he was also a member of Sigma Pi fraternity. He was selected by the Eagles in the eighth round of the 1938 NFL draft.

During World War II, Woltman volunteered with the Red Cross.
