= 1937 Illinois Fighting Illini football team =

American college football season

1937 Illinois Fighting Illini football
- Conference: Big Ten Conference
- Record: 3–3–2 (2–3 Big Ten)
- Head coach: Robert Zuppke (25th season)
- MVP: Jack Berner
- Captain: Lowell Spurgeon
- Home stadium: Memorial Stadium

1937 Big Ten Conference football standings
	Conf.					Overall
Team	W		L		T	W		L		T
No. 5 Minnesota $	5	–	0	–	0	6	–	2	–	0
No. 13 Ohio State	5	–	1	–	0	6	–	2	–	0
Indiana	3	–	2	–	0	5	–	3	–	0
Michigan	3	–	3	–	0	4	–	4	–	0
Northwestern	3	–	3	–	0	4	–	4	–	0
Purdue	2	–	2	–	1	4	–	3	–	1
Wisconsin	2	–	2	–	1	4	–	3	–	1
Illinois	2	–	3	–	0	3	–	3	–	2
Chicago	0	–	4	–	0	1	–	6	–	0
Iowa	0	–	5	–	0	1	–	7	–	0
$ – Conference champion; Rankings from AP Poll

The 1937 Illinois Fighting Illini football team was an American football team that represented the University of Illinois during the 1937 Big Ten Conference football season. In their 25th season under head coach Robert Zuppke, the Illini compiled a 3–3–2 record and finished in eighth place in the Big Ten Conference. Quarterback Jack Berner was selected as the team's most valuable player.

== Schedule ==
Date	Opponent	Site	Result	Attendance	Source
September 25	Ohio*	Memorial Stadium; Champaign, IL	W 20–6	20,059	
October 2	DePaul*	Memorial Stadium; Champaign, IL	T 0–0	25,000	
October 9	Notre Dame*	Memorial Stadium; Champaign, IL	T 0–0	42,253–45,000	
October 16	at Indiana	Memorial Stadium; Bloomington, IN (rivalry)	L 6–13	17,000	
October 30	Michigan	Memorial Stadium; Champaign, IL (rivalry)	L 6–7	32,506	
November 6	at No. 19 Northwestern	Dyche Stadium; Evanston, IL (rivalry)	W 6–0	42,000	
November 13	at Ohio State	Ohio Stadium; Columbus, OH (Illibuck)	L 0–19	41,921	
November 20	Chicago	Memorial Stadium; Champaign, IL	W 21–0	11,500–13,627	
*Non-conference game; Rankings from AP Poll released prior to the game
