= 1937 Minnesota Golden Gophers football team =

American college football season

1937 Minnesota Golden Gophers football

Big Ten champion
- Conference: Big Ten Conference

Ranking
- AP: No. 5
- Record: 6–2 (5–0 Big Ten)
- Head coach: Bernie Bierman (6th season)
- Offensive scheme: Single-wing
- MVP: Rudy Gmitro
- Captain: Ray King
- Home stadium: Memorial Stadium

1937 Big Ten Conference football standings
	Conf.					Overall
Team	W		L		T	W		L		T
No. 5 Minnesota $	5	–	0	–	0	6	–	2	–	0
No. 13 Ohio State	5	–	1	–	0	6	–	2	–	0
Indiana	3	–	2	–	0	5	–	3	–	0
Michigan	3	–	3	–	0	4	–	4	–	0
Northwestern	3	–	3	–	0	4	–	4	–	0
Purdue	2	–	2	–	1	4	–	3	–	1
Wisconsin	2	–	2	–	1	4	–	3	–	1
Illinois	2	–	3	–	0	3	–	3	–	2
Chicago	0	–	4	–	0	1	–	6	–	0
Iowa	0	–	5	–	0	1	–	7	–	0
$ – Conference champion; Rankings from AP Poll

The 1937 Minnesota Golden Gophers football team represented the University of Minnesota in the 1937 Big Ten Conference football season. In their sixth year under head coach Bernie Bierman, the Golden Gophers compiled a 6–2 record and outscored their opponents by a combined total of 184 to 50.

End Ray King was named an All-American by the Walter Camp Football Foundation and Look magazine. Fullback Andy Uram was named an All-American by the Associated Press. King, halfback Rudy Gmitro, tackle Lou Midler and guard Frank Twedell were named All-Big Ten first team.

Rudy Gmitro was awarded the Team MVP Award.

Total attendance for the season was 254,188, which averaged to 50,838. The season high for attendance was against Notre Dame.

== Schedule ==
Date	Opponent	Rank	Site	Result	Attendance	Source
September 25	North Dakota Agricultural*		Memorial Stadium; Minneapolis, MN	W 69–7	47,492	
October 2	at Nebraska*		Memorial Stadium; Lincoln, NE (rivalry)	L 9–14	37,000	
October 9	Indiana		Memorial Stadium; Minneapolis, MN	W 6–0	35,000	
October 16	at Michigan		Michigan Stadium; Ann Arbor, MI (Little Brown Jug)	W 39–6	53,266	
October 30	Notre Dame*	No. 4	Memorial Stadium; Minneapolis, MN	L 6–7	63,237–64,100	
November 6	at Iowa	No. 14	Iowa Stadium; Iowa City, IA (rivalry)	W 35–10	40,000	
November 13	Northwestern	No. 10	Memorial Stadium; Minneapolis, MN	W 7–0	63,000	
November 20	Wisconsin	No. 7	Memorial Stadium; Minneapolis, MN (rivalry)	W 13–6	46,000	
*Non-conference game; Rankings from AP Poll released prior to the game
