= 1937 Chicago Maroons football team =

American college football season

1937 Chicago Maroons football
- Conference: Big Ten Conference
- Record: 1–6 (0–4 Big Ten)
- Head coach: Clark Shaughnessy (5th season)
- Home stadium: Stagg Field

1937 Big Ten Conference football standings
	Conf.					Overall
Team	W		L		T	W		L		T
No. 5 Minnesota $	5	–	0	–	0	6	–	2	–	0
No. 13 Ohio State	5	–	1	–	0	6	–	2	–	0
Indiana	3	–	2	–	0	5	–	3	–	0
Michigan	3	–	3	–	0	4	–	4	–	0
Northwestern	3	–	3	–	0	4	–	4	–	0
Purdue	2	–	2	–	1	4	–	3	–	1
Wisconsin	2	–	2	–	1	4	–	3	–	1
Illinois	2	–	3	–	0	3	–	3	–	2
Chicago	0	–	4	–	0	1	–	6	–	0
Iowa	0	–	5	–	0	1	–	7	–	0
$ – Conference champion; Rankings from AP Poll

The 1937 Chicago Maroons football team was an American football team that represented the University of Chicago during the 1937 Big Ten Conference football season. In their fifth season under head coach Clark Shaughnessy, the Maroons compiled a 1–6 record, finished in ninth place in the Big Ten Conference, and were outscored by their opponents by a combined total of 143 to 45.

== Schedule ==
Date	Opponent	Site	Result	Attendance	Source
October 2	at Vanderbilt*	Dudley Field; Nashville, TN	L 0–18	5,000	
October 9	Wisconsin	Stagg Field; Chicago, IL	L 0–27	12,000	
October 16	Princeton*	Stagg Field; Chicago, IL	L 7–16	20,000	
October 30	No. 8 Ohio State	Stagg Field; Chicago, IL	L 0–39	10,000	
November 6	at Michigan	Michigan Stadium; Ann Arbor, MI (rivalry)	L 12–13	25,000	
November 13	Beloit*	Stagg Field; Chicago, IL	W 26–9	18,000	
November 20	at Illinois	Memorial Stadium; Champaign, IL	L 0–21	11,500–13,627	
*Non-conference game; Rankings from AP Poll released prior to the game
