= Bob Lannon =

American football player (1914–1995)

- Lannon catching a pass.

Iowa Hawkeyes
- Position: End

Personal information
- Born: September 30, 1914; Winner, South Dakota, U.S.
- Died: December 12, 1995 (aged 81); Pinehurst, North Carolina, U.S.
- Listed height: 6 ft 2 in (1.88 m)
- Listed weight: 195 lb (88 kg)

Career information
- High school: Winner (SD)
- College: Iowa (1934–1937)

Awards and highlights
- First-team All-Big Ten (1937); Second-team All-Big Ten (1935)

Robert Emmet Lannon (September 30, 1914 – December 12, 1995) was an American football end who played college football for the Iowa Hawkeyes.

Lannon was born on September 30, 1914, in Winner, South Dakota. He attended Winner High School before playing college football for Iowa. He earned a varsity letter starting in his sophomore year of 1935, and was given one each year until his graduation in 1938. Following his sophomore year, Lannon was voted second-team All-Big Ten by the Newspaper Enterprise Association. He had his best season as a senior in 1937, when he was awarded a first-team All-Big Ten selection by United Press and Associated Press. 27 of his 33 teammates voted him as team MVP. Following the year he was selected by the Philadelphia Eagles with the 52nd overall pick of the 1938 NFL draft. He opted not to pursue a professional career. Early in the year, Lannon was considered a candidate for the Syracuse football line coach position. He died on December 12, 1995, in North Carolina, at the age of 81.
