= Norm Purucker =

American football player (1917–2014)

Michigan Wolverines
- Position: Halfback

Personal information
- Born: June 24, 1917; Youngstown, Ohio, U.S.
- Died: November 12, 2014 (age 97); Boardman, Ohio, U.S.
- Listed height: 5 ft 11 in (1.80 m)
- Listed weight: 180 lb (82 kg)

Career information
- High school: Boardman (OH)
- College: Michigan (1936–1938)

Norman B. Purucker (June 24, 1917 – November 12, 2014) was an American football player.

== Early life ==
A native of Youngstown, Ohio, Purucker was the son of Frederick Purucker, a pipe fitter at a steel mill, who later worked as a meat cutter at a market. The family moved to Boardman, Ohio, while Purucker was a child. He attended Boardman High School where he was a star in football, basketball and track and field. The Vindicator called him "the greatest all-around athlete in Boardman history." In 1980, he became the first person inducted into the Boardman High School Hall of Fame.

== University of Michigan ==
Purucker enrolled at the University of Michigan and played at the halfback and punter positions for the Michigan Wolverines football team from 1936 to 1938. He was also a sprinter on the Michigan track team in 1938 and 1939.

== Professional football ==
Purucker signed with the Green Bay Packers in June 1939. but was released in September 1939 after reporting late due to his attendance at summer classes at Michigan. He filed a $2,000 lawsuit against the Packers that he had been promised $175 per game, regardless of whether he played. Purucker further alleged that he was released after sustaining an injury in a game against the Texas All-Stars.

== Later life ==
In January 1942, Purucker was accepted as a physical instructor with the United States Navy. He later worked as a real estate broker and income tax consultant. He died in Boardman, Ohio, in 2014 at age 97.
