= Irl Tubbs =

American football player and coach (1887–1970)

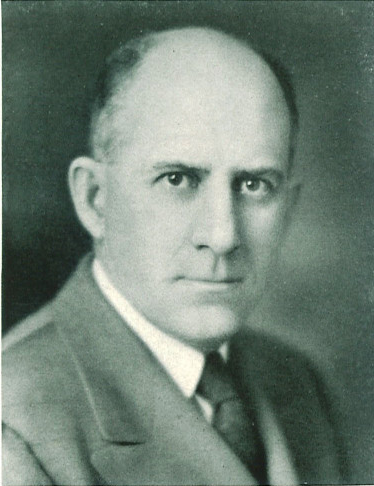

Biographical details
- Born: February 12, 1887; Pulaski County, Kentucky, U.S.
- Died: February 9, 1970 (aged 82); Kewanee, Illinois, U.S.

Playing career
- 1910s: William Jewell
- Positions: Quarterback, end

Coaching career (HC unless noted)
- 1923–1925: Superior Normal
- 1928–1929: Superior State
- 1935–1936: Miami (FL)
- 1937–1938: Iowa

Head coaching record
- Overall: 13–18–3 (excluding Superior Normal/State)

Accomplishments and honors

Championships
- 1 WIAC (1928)

Ira "Irl" Tubbs (February 12, 1887 – February 9, 1970) was an American college football player and coach. He served as the head football coach at Superior State Teachers College, now known as the University of Wisconsin–Superior (1923–1925, 1928–1929), the University of Miami (1935–1936), and the University of Iowa (1937–1938).

== Playing and coaching career ==
Tubbs played college football at William Jewell College in Liberty, Missouri. He was a quarterback and end for William Jewell in the late 1910s.

After graduation, Tubbs coached for two years in Missouri high schools before taking a coaching job at the University of Wisconsin–Superior. He was in Wisconsin for nine years from 1922 to 1930, although he was only able to coach for five seasons due to attacks of Malta fever.

At Wisconsin–Superior, Tubbs served as both athletic director and a coach of football and hockey. He coached from 1923 to 1925 and again in 1928 and 1929, leading his school to football championships his last two seasons. Tubbs was a renowned inventor, developing improvements to athletic equipment such as a special inverted air valve for a football and elastic padding for football pants.

Tubbs resigned from Wisconsin–Superior in 1930 after another bout of health problems and moved to Miami. While he was recovering there in 1935, the head football coaching job at the University of Miami opened, and Tubbs was hired to coach the Hurricanes. Tubbs coached the Hurricanes for two seasons in 1935 and 1936, where he compiled an 11–5–2 record. In both seasons, his Hurricane teams bowed out as potential hosts for New Year's Day bowl games.

Tubbs was then hired as the 14th head football coach at the University of Iowa. He coached two seasons at Iowa in 1937 and 1938. He had a record of just 2–13–1 at Iowa, with his wins coming over Bradley and Chicago. Tubbs' tenure at Iowa is best distinguished by his coaching of players who would star for Iowa's 1939 team, nicknamed the "Ironmen". Some of the players Tubbs coached included Nile Kinnick, an all-Big Ten Conference selection in 1937, and Erwin Prasse, an all-conference end in 1938.

Tubbs was inducted into the University of Wisconsin–Superior Athletics Hall of Fame in 1963.

== Head coaching record ==
Year	Team	Overall	Conference	Standing	Bowl/playoffs
Superior Normal Yellowjackets (Wisconsin Intercollegiate Athletic Conference) (1923–1925)
1923	Superior Normal		2–2	T–5th	
1924	Superior Normal		2–2	T–6th	
1925	Superior Normal		1–3	T–8th	
Superior State Yellowjackets (Wisconsin Intercollegiate Athletic Conference) (1928–1929)
1928	Superior State		3–0–1	T–1st	
1929	Superior State		3–1	2nd	
Superior Normal/State:			11–8–1		
Miami Hurricanes (Southern Intercollegiate Athletic Association) (1935–1936)
1935	Miami	5–3	1–1	T–15th	
1936	Miami	6–2–2	3–0	3rd	
Miami:		11–5–2	4–1		
Iowa Hawkeyes (Big Ten Conference) (1937–1938)
1937	Iowa	1–7	0–5	10th	
1938	Iowa	1–6–1	1–3–1	8th	
Iowa:		2–13–1	1–8–1		
Total:		13–18–3			
National championship Conference title Conference division title or championship game berth
