= Lou Midler =

American football player (1915–1992)

No. 23, 27
- Positions: Guard, tackle

Personal information
- Born: July 21, 1915; St. Paul, Minnesota, U.S.
- Died: August 29, 1992 (aged 77); St. Paul, Minnesota, U.S.
- Listed height: 6 ft 1 in (1.85 m)
- Listed weight: 223 lb (101 kg)

Career information
- High school: Washington (MN)
- College: Minnesota (1934–1937)
- NFL draft: 1938: 5th round, 34th overall pick

Career history

Playing
- Pittsburgh Pirates (1939); Green Bay Packers (1940)

Coaching
- Ohio Wesleyan (1938) Line coach; Macalester (1980–1991) Assistant coach

Awards and highlights
- 3× National champion (1934, 1935, 1936); First-team All-Big Ten (1937)

Career NFL statistics
- Games played: 18
- Stats at Pro Football Reference

Louis Thomas Midler (July 21, 1915 – August 29, 1992) was an American professional football player who was a guard and tackle for two seasons in the National Football League (NFL) for the Pittsburgh Pirates and Green Bay Packers. He played college football for the Minnesota Golden Gophers and was selected by the Pirates in the fifth round of the 1938 NFL draft.

== Early life ==
Louis Thomas Milder was born on July 21, 1915, in St. Paul, Minnesota. Growing up, he played football with kids older than himself, as he was large for his age. Midler weighed 180 pounds (82 kg) by the time he reached high school. He attended Washington High School in St. Paul, where he remains the school's only alumnus to have played in the NFL. As a freshman at Washington, Midler played every position except for quarterback and center. He then focused on playing tackle and was regarded as one of the team's top players and was named an all-city selection.

== College career ==
Midler enrolled at the University of Minnesota and began playing for their Golden Gopher football team in 1934 to fulfill a promise he made to one of their trainers. He had previously, when in high school, gone to a Minnesota facility and asked for a trainer for to look at his injured shoulder. He told the trainer who treated him, "You fix that shoulder up and I'll be back in a couple of years to play football for the Gophers." The trainer did not take him seriously, but Midler fulfilled his promise by going out for the Minnesota football team in 1934. That season, he played for the freshman team and was considered one of its "outstanding" players; a Star Tribune reporter described him as "exceptionally powerful, fast and alert," as well as the "best punter at Minnesota since Clarence Munn".

Midler lettered as a sophomore in 1935 and became a starter for the varsity team; he was switched at different times between guard and tackle throughout the season. That year, he helped them go undefeated, win the conference championship and win the national championship. A 60-minute man in some games, Midler helped Minnesota repeat as conference and national champions in 1936. As a senior in 1937, he helped the Golden Gophers compile a record of 7–1 and win the conference championship while being named first-team All-Big Ten. He also played in the East–West Shrine Bowl and in the Chicago College All-Star Game. Head coach Bernie Bierman later called Midler the greatest lineman he had ever coached. In addition to football, he also played basketball and baseball at Minnesota.

== Professional career ==
Midler was selected in the fifth round (34th overall) of the 1938 NFL draft by the Pittsburgh Pirates but spent that year coaching the line for the Ohio Wesleyan Battling Bishops. He joined the Pirates in 1939 and became a starter at tackle, finishing the year having played all 11 games played with four starts. He was traded to the Green Bay Packers in exchange for Hank Bruder in July 1940 and signed with the Packers the following month. Midler played seven games for Green Bay in the 1940 season, one as a starter. He was released on September 10, 1941.

== Later life ==
Midler served as a lieutenant in the United States Navy during World War II. He later lived in St. Paul and was a member of the M Club, the Saint Paul Vulcan organization, and was president of the St. Paul Commercial Club. From 1980 to 1991, he was an assistant coach for the Macalester Scots football program. He had three children. Midler died on August 29, 1992, in St. Paul, of cancer.
