= Jim McDonald (halfback) =

American football player and coach (1915–1997)

No. 20
- Positions: Halfback, fullback

Personal information
- Born: June 9, 1915; Springfield, Ohio, U.S.
- Died: May 1, 1997 (aged 81); Knoxville, Tennessee, U.S.
- Listed height: 6 ft 1 in (1.85 m)
- Listed weight: 193 lb (88 kg)

Career information
- High school: Springfield
- College: Ohio State
- NFL draft: 1938: 1st round, 2nd overall pick

Career history
- Detroit Lions (1938–1939)

Awards and highlights
- Third-team All-American (1937); First-team All-Big Ten (1937)

Career NFL statistics
- Rushing yards: 80
- Rushing average: 3.2
- Receptions: 7
- Receiving yards: 112
- Total touchdowns: 0
- Stats at Pro Football Reference

James Allen McDonald (June 9, 1915 – May 1, 1997) was an American professional football player for the Detroit Lions of the National Football League (NFL). He played college football for the Ohio State Buckeyes. After his playing career, he was the head coach at the University of Tennessee for one season.

== College playing career ==
McDonald was a halfback and quarterback for the Ohio State University football team from 1935 to 1937. In his senior year he was a team co-captain, and was named as an All-America selection. McDonald's most memorable play that year was only worth one point. He was kicking a point after touchdown against Northwestern and the ball was blocked. The holder, Mike Kabealo, grabbed the ball, pitched it back to McDonald. McDonald ran the ball around the right side for the point. The final score was 7–0.

McDonald was also a three-year starter as a guard on the Ohio State basketball team from 1936 to 1938. As a senior, he served as team captain.

McDonald was inducted into the Ohio State Varsity O Hall of Fame in 1986.

== Professional playing career ==
McDonald was selected by the Philadelphia Eagles in the first round as the second overall pick in the 1938 NFL draft, but never played for that team. He played two seasons with the Detroit Lions, picking up a career total of 80 yards on 25 carries.

== Coaching career ==
McDonald was an assistant football coach at the University of Tennessee under head coach Bowden Wyatt from 1955 to 1962. He succeeded Wyatt as head coach in 1963, but stayed at that position for only one year. McDonald remained at Tennessee as an assistant athletic director.

== Family ==
McDonald's son, James McDonald, Jr., was a starting defensive end for the Volunteers in 1967.

== Head coaching record ==
Year	Team	Overall	Conference	Standing	Bowl/playoffs
Tennessee Volunteers (Southeastern Conference) (1963)
1963	Tennessee	5–5	3–5	9th	
Tennessee:		5–5	3–5		
Total:		5–5			
