= Sweeneyburg, West Virginia =

Sweeneyburg
- Unincorporated community
- Location within the state of West Virginia Sweeneyburg (the United States)
- Coordinates: 37°50′11″N 81°15′28″W
- Country: United States
- State: West Virginia
- County: Raleigh
- Elevation: 1,828 ft (557 m)
- Time zone: UTC-5 (Eastern (EST))
  - Summer (DST): UTC-4 (EDT)
- GNIS ID: 1558395

Sweeneyburg is an unincorporated community in Raleigh County, West Virginia, United States.
