= Whittaker, West Virginia =

- Unincorporated community
- Location within West Virginia Location within the United States
- Coordinates: 38°04′39″N 81°22′48″W
- Country: United States
- State: West Virginia
- County: Kanawha
- Elevation: 807 ft (246 m)
- Time zone: UTC-5 (Eastern (EST))
  - Summer (DST): UTC-4 (EDT)
- Area codes: 304 & 681
- GNIS feature ID: 1555979

Whittaker is an unincorporated community in Kanawha County, West Virginia, United States. Whittaker is 9 miles (14 km) south of Pratt.
