= Gallagher, West Virginia =

Unincorporated community in West Virginia, United States

- Unincorporated community
- Location within West Virginia Location within the United States
- Coordinates: 38°10′23″N 81°24′06″W
- Country: United States
- State: West Virginia
- County: Kanawha
- Elevation: 646 ft (197 m)
- Time zone: UTC-5 (Eastern (EST))
  - Summer (DST): UTC-4 (EDT)
- ZIP code: 25083
- Area codes: 304 & 681
- GNIS feature ID: 1539312

Gallagher is an unincorporated community in Kanawha County, West Virginia, United States. Gallagher is 3 miles (4.8 km) south-southwest of Pratt. Gallagher has a post office with ZIP code 25083. It was also called Mucklow.
