= Gust Zarnas =

American football player (1913–2000)

No. 28, 26, 63
- Position: Guard

Personal information
- Born: December 16, 1913; Icaria, Greece
- Died: December 26, 2000 (aged 87); Bethlehem, Pennsylvania, U.S.
- Listed height: 5 ft 10 in (1.78 m)
- Listed weight: 220 lb (100 kg)

Career information
- High school: The Kiski School (Saltsburg, Pennsylvania, U.S.)
- College: Ohio State (1934–1937)
- NFL draft: 1938: 5th round, 40th overall pick

Career history
- Chicago Bears (1938); Brooklyn Dodgers (1939); Green Bay Packers (1939–1940)

Awards and highlights
- NFL champion (1939); Pro Bowl (1939); First-team All-American (1937); First-team All-Big Ten (1937)

Career NFL statistics
- Games played: 28
- Games started: 7
- Stats at Pro Football Reference
- College Football Hall of Fame

Gustave Constantine Zarnas (December 16, 1913 – December 26, 2000) was a Greek-born American professional football guard. Born in Icaria, Greece, he moved with his parents to the U.S. at age five and grew up in Pennsylvania. After high school, he played college football for the Ohio State Buckeyes from 1934 to 1937 and was named first-team All-American as a senior. He then played three seasons of professional football in the National Football League (NFL) for the Chicago Bears, Brooklyn Dodgers and Green Bay Packers, winning an NFL championship in 1939. He was the first NFL player from Greece. After his career, he worked as a coach and founded a contractor business. He was inducted into the College Football Hall of Fame in 1975.

== Early life ==
Zarnas was born on December 16, 1913, in Icaria, Greece. He immigrated to the U.S. with his parents at age five and grew up in a Pennsylvania steel town amidst the Great Depression. He first attended Har-Brack High School in Natrona Heights, Pennsylvania, before later attending The Kiski School in Saltsburg. He was a top football player at Kiski, where he was a fullback and guard, winning "wide acclaim" according to the Sidney Daily News, while at fullback he, "like a battering ram[,] would plough through the line for yards plus."

== College career ==
Although Zarnas did not have the money himself to attend college, he was noticed by a scout at Ohio State University who gave him an opportunity to attend the school to play for the Ohio State Buckeyes football team. He thus entered Ohio State in 1934. That year, he was a member of the freshman team, though he "didn't outshine the rest to any great degree," according to the Daily News. The next summer, he grew stronger after working as a laborer for the Ohio State stadium, and he made the varsity team for the 1935 season as a guard. He alternated with others at the position but as a two-way player still managed to play "at least half of the time in all games." During this time, his schedule had him attend school until 3:00 p.m., practice football until 6:00, work as a clerk until 11:00 p.m., and then study until 1:00 a.m.

Zarnas helped the 1935 Buckeyes to a shared Big Ten Conference title while losing only one game. The following year, he was the starting guard for Ohio State, as they compiled a record of 5–3, tying for second in the Big Ten; the Buckeyes shut out four of their opponents and only allowed 27 points to be scored against them all season. In his senior year, he was the team's top lineman and helped the Buckeyes record six shutouts while compiling a record of 6–2, placing second in the Big Ten. The 5 ft 10 in (1.78 m), 220-pound (100 kg) Zarnas was named All-Big Ten, All-Midwest and first-team All-American for his performance in the 1937 season. He was also selected for the East–West Shrine Game and the Chicago Charities College All-Star Game.

In Zarnas's three years playing for the varsity team, Ohio State compiled a record of 18–6. The team defeated the rival Michigan Wolverines in each of his years at the school, and Zarnas helped defeat the Wolverines in 1935, 1936, and 1937, with each of those being shutout wins by at least 21 points. In addition to his play at guard, Zarnas was also occasionally used on trick plays as he was "brilliant" at throwing the ball. In his senior year, against Indiana, he took a handoff and then completed a 57-yard pass to Fred Crow. At Ohio State, Zarnas also competed for the varsity baseball and track and field teams, and won the school's intramural heavyweight wrestling title.

== Professional career ==
Zarnas was selected in the fifth round (40th overall) of the 1938 NFL draft by the Chicago Bears. He signed to play for the Bears in July 1938. He made the team and ended up playing in 10 games, one as a starter, during the 1938 season, helping the Bears compile a record of 6–5. He became the first NFL player from Greece. In August 1939, prior to the regular season, he was traded from the Bears to the Brooklyn Dodgers in exchange for Joe Siegel. He appeared in four games for the Dodgers, two as a starter, before being released on October 12. Five days after his release by the Dodgers, Zarnas signed with the Green Bay Packers. He appeared in a further five games for the Packers, two as a starter. He played a full 60 minutes in the Packers' game against the Dodgers, facing off against his former teammates, and also played half of the Packers' 27–0 victory of the New York Giants in the 1939 NFL Championship Game. In the championship, he recorded a sack. He participated in the 1940 NFL All-Star Game after the season.

Zarnas returned to the Packers in 1940 and was moved from right guard, his previous position, to left guard. He appeared in nine games, two as a starter, for the Packers in 1940, helping them compile a record of 6–2–1, which placed second in their division. He did not return for the 1941 season, concluding his professional career having appeared in 28 games, seven as a starter.

== Later life and death ==
During his professional football career, Zarnas co-owned a restaurant in Columbus, Ohio. In 1941, he was named assistant football coach at East Liverpool High School. At the start of World War II, he entered the United States Navy and became a lieutenant. While in the Navy, Zarnas played for the 1942 Great Lakes Navy Bluejackets football team that won the Armed Services Football Championship. He was discharged in December 1945. He then became an instructor, football coach, and wrestling coach at the United States Merchant Marine Academy in 1946, before becoming a football and wrestling coach at Easton Area High School in 1947, where he worked through 1949. He founded the wrestling program at Easton, which became "one of the finest in all of Pennsylvania", according to The Morning Call.

Zarnas studied at universities in Pittsburgh and New York for a master's degree. After working at Easton, he founded G. C. Zarnas & Co., Inc., a specialty services contractor in Bethlehem, Pennsylvania. He served as the business's president and treasurer until his death. He was a founding member of the Lehigh Valley Chapter of the National Football Foundation, a Mason and a member of the American Hellenic Educational Progressive Association. He also served as vice chairman of the Historic Bethlehem Preservation Fund Campaign and was active in raising money for local hospitals and religious organizations.

Zarnas was inducted into the College Football Hall of Fame in 1975. He was inducted to the Ohio State Hall of Fame in 1978 and also to the AHEPA and Allegheny-Kiski Valley sport halls of fame. He married Grace Kotses and had a son and a daughter. Zarnas died on December 26, 2000, in Bethlehem, at the age of 87.
