= Maynor, West Virginia =

Maynor
- Unincorporated community
- Location within the state of West Virginia Maynor (the United States)
- Coordinates: 37°51′57″N 81°16′4″W
- Country: United States
- State: West Virginia
- County: Raleigh
- Elevation: 1,706 ft (520 m)
- Time zone: UTC-5 (Eastern (EST))
  - Summer (DST): UTC-4 (EDT)
- GNIS ID: 1542905

Maynor is an unincorporated community in Raleigh County, West Virginia, United States. Its post office is closed.

The community was named after a local family with the last name of "Maynor".
