= Corbett Davis =

American football player (1914–1968)

Corby Davis
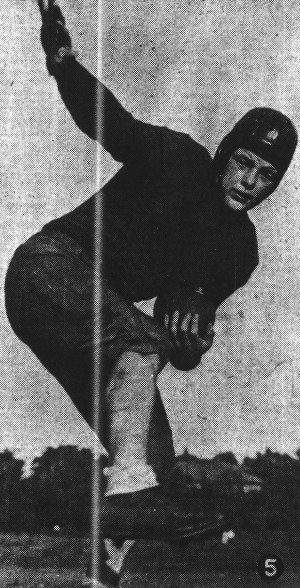
- Davis, circa 1937

No. 32, 3
- Position: Fullback

Personal information
- Born: December 8, 1914; Lowell, Indiana, U.S.
- Died: May 28, 1968 (aged 53); Houlton, Maine, U.S.
- Listed height: 5 ft 11 in (1.80 m)
- Listed weight: 212 lb (96 kg)

Career information
- High school: Lowell
- College: Indiana
- NFL draft: 1938: 1st round, 1st overall pick

Career history
- Cleveland Rams (1938–1939, 1941–1942)

Awards and highlights
- First-team All-American (1937); Chicago Tribune Silver Football (1937); First-team All-Big Ten (1937)

Career NFL statistics
- Rushing yards: 382
- Rushing average: 2.7
- Receptions: 19
- Receiving yards: 133
- Touchdowns: 4
- Stats at Pro Football Reference

Richard Corbett "Corby" Davis (December 8, 1914 – May 28, 1968) was an American professional football fullback. He was the first overall pick in the 1938 NFL draft by the Cleveland Rams. He played college football at Indiana.

He spent four seasons with the Cleveland Rams, leaving professional football to enlist in the service in 1942. Corbett served as a rifleman with the Second Infantry Division in France during World War II. He was wounded in action in 1944, and continued his service in England after recovering from his injuries.

After returning to the States, Corbett worked as an official for games in the Big Ten Conference. From 1952 until his death, he worked for the Scott Foresman publishing company. He died while on a fishing trip in Maine in May 1968. He lost his footing while stepping out of a boat, fell on a tree branch, and ruptured his spleen.
