= 1937 All-Big Ten Conference football team =

American college football all-star team

The 1937 All-Big Ten Conference football team consists of American football players selected to the All-Big Ten Conference teams chosen by various selectors for the 1937 Big Ten Conference football season.

== All Big-Ten selections ==
=== Ends ===
- Ray Wallace King, Minnesota (AP-1; UP-1)
- Bob Lannon, Iowa (AP-1; UP-2)
- Jim Zachary, Purdue (UP-1)
- Robert Fitzgerald, Chicago (AP-2)
- Fred Benz, Wisconsin (AP-2)
- Bob Kenderdine, Indiana (UP-2)

=== Tackles ===
- Lou Midler, Minnesota (AP-1; UP-2)
- Bob Haak, Indiana (UP-1)
- Carl Kaplanoff, Ohio State (UP-1)
- Marty Schreyer, Purdue (AP-1)
- Alex Schoenbaum, Ohio State (AP-2)
- Don Siegel, Michigan (AP-2)
- Clem Woltman, Purdue (UP-2)

=== Guards ===
- Frank Twedell, Minnesota (AP-1; UP-1)
- Ralph Heikkinen, Michigan (AP-2; UP-1)
- Gust Zarnas, Ohio State (AP-1; UP-2)
- Jim Freeman, Indiana (AP-2)
- Mel Brewer, Illinois (UP-2)

=== Centers ===
- Ralph Wolf, Ohio State (AP-1)
- George Miller, Indiana (AP-2; UP-1)
- James W. McDonald, Illinois (UP-2)

=== Quarterbacks ===
- Jim McDonald, Ohio State (AP-1; UP-1)
- Fred Vanzo, Northwestern (AP-2)

=== Halfbacks ===
- Nile Kinnick, Iowa (AP-2; UP-1)
- Cecil Isbell, Purdue (AP-1; UP-2 [fullback])
- Don Heap, Northwestern (AP-1; UP-2 [quarterback])
- Rudy Gmitro, Minnesota (UP-1)
- Hal Van Every, Minnesota (AP-2; UP-2)
- Bill Schmitz, Wisconsin (UP-2)

=== Fullbacks ===
- Corbett Davis, Indiana (AP-1; UP-1)
- Larry Buhler, Minnesota (AP-2)

== Key ==
AP = Associated Press

UP = United Press

Bold = Consensus first-team selection of both the AP and UP

== See also ==
- 1937 College Football All-America Team
