= Don Heap =

American football and baseball player and coach (1912–2016)

Biographical details
- Born: September 28, 1912; Evanston, Illinois, U.S.
- Died: March 21, 2016 (aged 103)

Playing career

Football
- 1936–1938: Northwestern
- Position: Halfback

Coaching career (HC unless noted)

Football
- 1939–1941: Illinois Wesleyan
- 1942: Iowa Pre-Flight (assistant)
- 1946: Northwestern (freshmen)

Baseball
- 1941: Illinois Wesleyan
- 1946: Northwestern (assistant)
- 1947–1948: Northwestern

Track
- 1939–1941: Illinois Wesleyan

Administrative career (AD unless noted)
- 1939–1942: Illinois Wesleyan

Head coaching record
- Overall: 13–10–2 (football); 28–26–1 (baseball)

Accomplishments and honors

Championships
- Football; 2 ICC (1939–1940)

Awards
- 2× First-team All-Big Ten (1936, 1937); Second-team All-Big Ten (1935)

Donald Eugene Heap (September 28, 1912 – March 21, 2016) was an American football and baseball player and coach. He was twice selected as an All-American football player while playing for the Northwestern Wildcats football team.

== Early years ==
Heap was born in 1912 in Evanston, Illinois, the son of Frank Heap and Rosella (Van Geem) Heap. He attended Evanston Township High School, where he played football, basketball, and baseball, and graduated in 1930.

== Northwestern ==
Heap subsequently enrolled at Northwestern University in Evanston, where he played football and basketball, and was a member of Phi Delta Theta. He played at the halfback position for the Northwestern Wildcats football team from 1936 to 1938. As a sophomore, he was selected by the Central Press Association as a first-team halfback on the 1936 College Football All-America Team. As a senior, he served as the captain of Northwestern's football team, was named its most valuable player and was selected by Paramount News to the 1938 College Football All-America Team. In his three years at Northwestern, Heap was a triple-threat player, handling kicking, passing and rushing responsibilities and calling signals for the team. He averaged more than five yards per carry. Northwestern coach Pappy Waldorf said that Heap had one of the best football minds he had encountered.

== Coaching career ==
After graduating from Northwestern, Heap was hired as the head football and baseball coach at Illinois Wesleyan University, where he served for three years. His teams won two Illinois College Conference championships.

During World War II, Heap served in the United States Navy, attaining the rank of lieutenant commander. His naval service included one year as an assistant coach for the Iowa Pre-Flight Seahawks football team at the University of Iowa. He also served at a naval aviation base in Devonshire, England.

In 1946, after his discharge from the Navy, Heap was hired by Northwestern University as its freshman football coach and assistant baseball coach. In 1947, Heap became head baseball coach at Northwestern and continued his position with the football team. Heap served two seasons as head baseball coach, compiling a 21–25–1 record from 1947 to 1948.

== Head coaching record ==
=== Football ===
Year	Team	Overall	Conference	Standing	Bowl/playoffs
Illinois Wesleyan Titans (Illinois College Conference) (1939–1941)
1939	Illinois Wesleyan	4–4	2–0	1st	
1940	Illinois Wesleyan	7–1	3–0	T–1st	
1941	Illinois Wesleyan	2–5–2	0–2–1	T–8th	
Illinois Wesleyan:		13–10–2	5–2–1		
Total:		13–10–2			
National championship Conference title Conference division title or championship game berth
