= 1931 Southern Intercollegiate Athletic Association men's basketball tournament =

- Classification: Division I
- Teams: 14
- Site: Jackson, MS
- Champions: Centenary Gentlemen (1 title)
- Winning coach: Curtis Parker (1 title)
- Southern Intercollegiate Athletic Association men's basketball tournaments

The 1931 Southern Intercollegiate Athletic Association men's basketball tournament took place February 25–28, 1931, at Jackson, MS. The Centenary Gentlemen won their first Southern Intercollegiate Athletic Association title, led by head coach Curtis Parker.

"Winning the S. I. A. A. tournament at Jackson, Miss., gave the Gentlemen the championship of their own conference. Centenary played great basketball to win the tournament, and were without a doubt the cleverest passing team at Jackson. For this the school received a beautiful full size silver basketball suitably engraved, and each player was awarded a solid gold medal."

== Bracket ==
First round February 24
Centenary	45
Union	12
Eastern Kentucky	41
Berea	26
Louisiana-Lafayette	29
Birmingham-Southern	43
Millsaps
Bye
Western Kentucky
Bye
Centre	36
Howard	47
Mississippi College	61
Stetson	37
SW Presbyterian	43
Louisiana Normal	45

Quarterfinals; February 25
Centenary	29
Eastern Kentucky	20
Birmingham-Southern	37
Millsaps	28
Western Kentucky	34
Howard	26
Mississippi College	38
Louisiana Normal	39

Semifinals; February 26
Centenary	21
Birmingham-Southern	20
Western Kentucky	34
Louisiana Normal	39

Finals; February 27
Centenary	35
Louisiana Normal	24

=== Championship ===
February 27

Centenary 35, Louisiana Normal 24

Jackson, MS

== See also ==
- List of SIAA basketball champions
