= Tranny Lee Gaddy =

American football player and coach (1894–1975)

Biographical details
- Born: January 8, 1894; Itawamba County, Mississippi, U.S.
- Died: October 25, 1975 (aged 81); Jackson, Mississippi, U.S.

Playing career

Football
- 1913–1916: Mississippi State

Basketball
- 1913–1917: Mississippi State

Track
- 1913–1916: Mississippi State

Coaching career (HC unless noted)

Football
- 1931–1938: Millsaps

Head coaching record
- Overall: 29–39–10

Tranny Lee Gaddy (January 8, 1894 – October 12, 1975) was an American football player and coach. He served as the head football coach at Millsaps College from 1931 to 1938.

== Head coaching record ==
Year	Team	Overall	Conference	Standing	Bowl/playoffs
Millsaps Majors (Dixie Conference / Southern Intercollegiate Athletic Association) (1931–1938)
1931	Millsaps	3–5	0–3 / 2–4	T–8th / T–19th	
1932	Millsaps	4–5	2–3 / 1–3	T–6th / T–19th	
1933	Millsaps	4–4–2	1–1–1 / 3–2–1	T–4th / T–11th	
1934	Millsaps	7–1–2	2–1–1 / 4–0–2	3rd / 3rd	
1935	Millsaps	4–4–2	1–1–2	T–4th	
1936	Millsaps	3–5–2	2–3	7th	
1937	Millsaps	3–5–2	1–1–2	T–4th	
1938	Millsaps	1–10	0–5	9th	
Millsaps:		29–39–10			
Total:		29–39–10			
