= Henry O. Crawford =

American football and track and field coach

Biographical details
- Born: April 28, 1901
- Died: August 2, 1967 (aged 66); Huntsville, Texas, U.S.
- Education: Austin (1927)

Coaching career (HC unless noted)

Football
- 1936–1937: Sam Houston State

Track
- 1929: Sam Houston State

Head coaching record
- Overall: 7–12 (football)

Henry O. "Molly" Crawford (April 28, 1901 – August 2, 1967) was an American football and track and field coach. He served as the head football coach at Sam Houston State University from 1936 to 1937. He also served as the school's track coach beginning in 1929.

== Head coaching record ==
=== Football ===
Year	Team	Overall	Conference	Standing	Bowl/playoffs
Sam Houston State Bearkats (Lone Star Conference) (1936–1937)
1936	Sam Houston State	2–7	0–4	5th	
1937	Sam Houston State	5–5	1–3	4th	
Sam Houston State:		7–12	1–7		
Total:		7–12			
