= Howard Hancock =

Coach

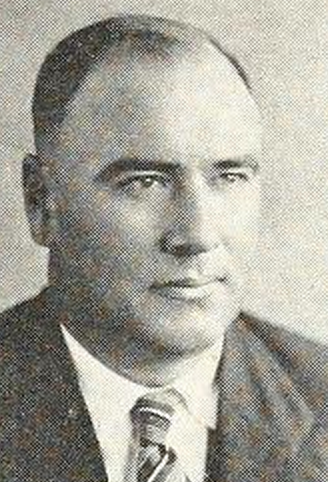
- Hancock pictured in The Index 1932, Illinois State yearbook

Biographical details
- Born: December 20, 1894; Shullsburg, Wisconsin, U.S.
- Died: February 12, 1978 (aged 83); Colfax, Illinois, U.S.
- Education: University of Wisconsin (1918); Indiana University

Playing career

Football
- 1916–1917: Wisconsin

Baseball
- c. 1917: Wisconsin

Coaching career (HC unless noted)

Football
- 1921–1928: Oshkosh Normal/State
- 1930: Oshkosh State
- 1931–1944: Illinois State Normal

Baseball
- 1933–1946: Illinois State Normal

Administrative career (AD unless noted)
- 1921–1931: Oshkosh Normal/State
- 1931–1963: Illinois State Normal

Head coaching record
- Overall: 95–65–29 (football); 120–112–2 (baseball)

Accomplishments and honors

Championships
- Football; 2 INACW/WSTCC (1923, 1928); 3 IIAC (1937, 1940–1941)

Howard Joseph Hancock (December 20, 1894 – February 12, 1978) was an American football and baseball coach and college athletics administrator. He served as the head football coach at Oshkosh State Normal School—now known as the University of Wisconsin–Oshkosh from 1921 to 1928 and again in 1930 and at Illinois State Normal University—now known as Illinois State University—in Normal, Illinois, from 1931 until 1944, and compiling a career college football coaching record of 95–65–29. Hancock was the head baseball coach at Illinois State from 1933 to 1946, tallying a mark of 120–112–2, and also coached golf at the school. He was the athletic director at Oshkosh State from 1921 to 1931 and Illinois State from 1931 to 1961. Hancock Stadium, the home venue for the Illinois State Redbirds football team is named for him.

Hancock was born on December 20, 1894, in Shullsburg, Wisconsin. He was captain of the football team at the University of Wisconsin–Madison before graduating in 1918. Hancock died on February 12, 1978, while visiting his wife at the Octavia Manor Nursing Home in Colfax, Illinois.

Including his records from other schools, Hancock leads college football with the highest tie percentage in varsity play. Hancock's overall record was 91–63–25, a tie percentage of 14.4%.

== Head coaching record ==
=== Football ===
| Year | Team | Overall | Conference | Standing | Bowl/playoffs |
|---|---|---|---|---|---|
Oshkosh Normal/State Titans (Inter-Normal Athletic Conference of Wisconsin / Wisconsin State Teachers College Conference) (1921–1928)
| 1921 | Oshkosh Normal | 5–2 | 3–1 | 2nd | |
| 1922 | Oshkosh Normal | 4–1–3 | 3–1–3 | 3rd | |
| 1923 | Oshkosh Normal | 7–0 | 5–0 | 1st | |
| 1924 | Oshkosh Normal | 5–3 | 3–2 | 5th | |
| 1925 | Oshkosh Normal | 5–2–1 | 3–0–1 | 2nd | |
| 1926 | Oshkosh State | 3–3–1 | 2–1–1 | T–4th | |
| 1927 | Oshkosh State | 2–3–1 | 1–2–1 | 7th | |
| 1928 | Oshkosh State | 5–1–2 | 3–0–2 | T–1st | |
Oshkosh State Titans (Wisconsin State Teachers College Conference) (1930)
| 1930 | Oshkosh State | 2–4–2 | 2–2–1 | 5th | |
| Oshkosh Normal/State: | | 38–19–10 | 25–9–9 | | |
Illinois State Normal Redbirds (Illinois Intercollegiate Athletic Conference) (1931–1944)
| 1931 | Illinois State Normal | 1–6–1 | 1–6–1 | 20th | |
| 1932 | Illinois State Normal | 7–2 | 6–2 | 4th | |
| 1933 | Illinois State Normal | 6–3 | 5–2 | 9th | |
| 1934 | Illinois State Normal | 2–4–2 | 2–3–2 | 12th | |
| 1935 | Illinois State Normal | 5–2–2 | 4–2–1 | T–7th | |
| 1936 | Illinois State Normal | 3–4–2 | 2–3–1 | 13th | |
| 1937 | Illinois State Normal | 5–1–2 | 4–0–2 | T–1st | |
| 1938 | Illinois State Normal | 5–4–1 | 4–1 | 3rd | |
| 1939 | Illinois State Normal | 4–2–3 | 3–0–2 | 2nd | |
| 1940 | Illinois State Normal | 5–3–1 | 4–0 | 1st | |
| 1941 | Illinois State Normal | 3–4–2 | 3–1 | T–1st | |
| 1942 | Illinois State Normal | 2–5–1 | 2–1–1 | 3rd | |
| 1943 | Illinois State Normal | 6–2–1 | 1–0 | NA | |
| 1944 | Illinois State Normal | 3–4–1 | 1–0 | 2nd | |
| Illinois State Normal: | | 57–46–19 | 42–21–10 | | |
| Total: | | 95–65–29 | | | |
National championship Conference title Conference division title or championship game berth
