= 1937 Sam Houston State Bearkats football team =

American college football season

1937 Sam Houston State Bearkats football
- Conference: Lone Star Conference
- Record: 5–5 (1–3 LSC)
- Head coach: Henry O. Crawford (2nd season)
- Home stadium: Pritchett Field

1937 Lone Star Conference football standings
	Conf.					Overall
Team	W		L		T	W		L		T
East Texas State $	4	–	0	–	0	8	–	2	–	0
North Texas State	2	–	1	–	1	4	–	4	–	2
Southwest Texas State	2	–	2	–	0	6	–	4	–	0
Sam Houston State	1	–	3	–	0	5	–	5	–	0
Stephen F. Austin	0	–	3	–	1	1	–	6	–	1
$ – Conference champion

The 1937 Sam Houston State Bearkats football team represented Sam Houston State Teachers College (now known as Sam Houston State University) as a member of the Lone Star Conference (LSC) during the 1937 college football season. Led by second-year head coach Henry O. Crawford, the Bearkats compiled an overall record of 5–5 with a mark of 1–3 in conference play, and finished fourth in the LSC.

== Schedule ==
Date	Opponent	Site	Result	Attendance	Source
September 24	Trinity (TX)*	Pritchett Field; Huntsville, TX	W 2–0		
October 1	Schreiner*	Pritchett Field; Huntsville, TX	W 7–0		
October 8	at Louisiana Normal*	Normal Field; Natchitoches, LA	L 6–7	3,000	
October 16	at Texas A&I*	Kingsville, TX	W 16–14		
October 22	Lamar*	Pritchett Field; Huntsville, TX	W 16–7		
October 29	at North Texas State	Eagle Field; Denton, TX	L 6–13		
November 6	East Texas State	Pritchett Field; Huntsville, TX	L 0–26		
November 11	Texas Wesleyan*	Pritchett Field; Huntsville, TX	L 0–9		
November 20	at Southwest Texas State	Evans Field; San Marcos, TX (rivalry)	L 6–14		
November 25	at Stephen F. Austin	Birdwell Field; Nacogdoches, TX (rivalry)	W 8–0		
*Non-conference game
