= 1937 Western Kentucky State Teachers Hilltoppers football team =

American college football season

1937 Western Kentucky State Teachers Hilltoppers football
- Conference: Kentucky Intercollegiate Athletic Conference, Southern Intercollegiate Athletic Association
- Record: 7–1–1 (1–0–1 KIAC, 3–0–1 SIAA)
- Head coach: Carl Anderson (5th season)
- Captains: Clarence Caple; Joe Cook

1937 Kentucky Intercollegiate Athletic Conference football standings
	Conf.					Overall
Team	W		L		T	W		L		T
Centre $	2	–	0	–	0	6	–	2	–	1
Murray State	1	–	0	–	1	8	–	1	–	1
Western Kentucky State Teachers	1	–	0	–	1	7	–	1	–	1
Morehead State	3	–	1	–	0	7	–	1	–	0
Union (KY)	2	–	1	–	0	4	–	3	–	0
Eastern Kentucky	2	–	2	–	1	5	–	2	–	1
Transylvania	2	–	4	–	0	3	–	5	–	0
Georgetown (KY)	1	–	3	–	0	3	–	5	–	0
Louisville	0	–	3	–	1	2	–	5	–	1
$ – Conference champion

1937 Southern Intercollegiate Athletic Association football standings
	Conf.					Overall
Team	W		L		T	W		L		T
Murray State $	6	–	0	–	1	8	–	1	–	1
Erskine	5	–	0	–	0	6	–	4	–	0
Centre	3	–	0	–	0	6	–	2	–	1
Western Kentucky State Teachers	3	–	0	–	1	7	–	1	–	1
Centenary	1	–	0	–	2	6	–	3	–	3
Miami (FL)	1	–	0	–	0	4	–	4	–	1
Morehead State	4	–	1	–	0	7	–	1	–	0
Louisiana Tech	3	–	1	–	2	6	–	3	–	2
Louisiana Normal	3	–	1	–	1	4	–	4	–	1
Middle Tennessee State Teachers	2	–	1	–	1	6	–	1	–	1
Mississippi State Teachers	4	–	2	–	0	7	–	3	–	0
Union (KY)	2	–	1	–	0	4	–	3	–	0
Eastern Kentucky	3	–	2	–	1	5	–	2	–	1
Rollins	3	–	2	–	0	5	–	4	–	0
Oglethorpe	3	–	3	–	0	3	–	6	–	1
SW Louisiana	2	–	3	–	1	4	–	3	–	1
Stetson	2	–	3	–	0	5	–	4	–	0
Mississippi College	2	–	3	–	1	3	–	6	–	1
Wofford	2	–	3	–	0	2	–	7	–	0
Newberry	2	–	3	–	0	2	–	8	–	0
Transylvania	2	–	4	–	0	3	–	5	–	0
Louisiana College	2	–	4	–	0	3	–	6	–	0
Millsaps	1	–	3	–	2	3	–	5	–	2
Georgetown (KY)	1	–	3	–	0	3	–	5	–	0
Louisville	1	–	3	–	1	2	–	5	–	1
Troy State	1	–	3	–	0	2	–	7	–	2
Tennessee Tech	1	–	5	–	1	3	–	5	–	1
West Tennessee State Teachers	1	–	5	–	0	3	–	6	–	0
Presbyterian	0	–	3	–	0	0	–	10	–	0
Union (TN)	0	–	5	–	1	1	–	8	–	1
$ – Conference champion

The 1937 Western Kentucky State Teachers Hilltoppers football team represented Western Kentucky State Teachers College—now known as Western Kentucky University—as a member of the Kentucky Intercollegiate Athletic Conference (KIAC) and the Southern Intercollegiate Athletic Association (SIAA) during the 1937 college football season. Led by Carl Anderson in his fifth and final season as head coach, the Hilltoppers compiled an overall record of 7–1–1 with marks of 1–0–1 in KIAC play and of 3–0–1 against SIAA opponents.

Team captain Clarence Caple and Joe Cook were named to the All Kentucky Team.

== Schedule ==
Date	Opponent	Site	Result	Source
September 24	Emporia State*	Bowling Green, KY	W 7–0	
October 1	at Bradley*	Peoria, IL	W 21–0	
October 9	Tampa*^{†}	Bowling Green, KY	W 13–0	
October 15	at Tennessee Tech	Cookeville, TN	W 20–0	
October 22	Union (TN)	Bowling Green, KY	W 21–0	
October 30	at Western State Teachers*	Western State Teachers College Field; Kalamazoo, MI	L 7–13	
November 6	Eastern Kentucky	Bowling Green, KY (rivalry)	W 23–0	
November 13	Western Illinois*	Bowling Green, KY	W 28–0	
November 20	Murray State	Bowling Green, KY (rivalry)	T 7–7	
*Non-conference game; ^{†}Homecoming
