= 1937 Upper Iowa Peacocks football team =

American college football season

1937 Upper Iowa Peacocks football

Iowa Conference co-champion
- Conference: Iowa Conference
- Record: 6–0 (6–0 Iowa)
- Head coach: John "Doc" Dorman (29th season)
- Home stadium: Dorman Field

1937 Iowa Conference football standings
	Conf.					Overall
Team	W		L		T	W		L		T
Upper Iowa +	6	–	0	–	0	6	–	0	–	0
St. Ambrose +	5	–	0	–	0	8	–	0	–	0
Dubuque	3	–	1	–	1	3	–	4	–	1
Luther	2	–	1	–	3	4	–	1	–	3
Buena Vista	3	–	2	–	0	5	–	3	–	0
Parsons	3	–	2	–	1	5	–	3	–	1
Central (IA)	3	–	2	–	1	3	–	5	–	1
Columbia (IA)	2	–	3	–	1	4	–	5	–	1
Western Union	1	–	2	–	0	4	–	4	–	0
Iowa Wesleyan	2	–	4	–	1	3	–	4	–	2
Wartburg	0	–	2	–	1	1	–	4	–	2
Penn (IA)	0	–	5	–	1	1	–	5	–	1
Simpson (IA)	0	–	6	–	0	0	–	9	–	0
+ – Conference co-champions

The 1937 Upper Iowa Peacocks football team was an American football team that represented Upper Iowa University as a member of the Iowa Conference during the 1937 college football season. In their 29th season under head coach John "Doc" Dorman, the Peacocks compiled a 6–0 record, shared the Iowa Conference championship with St. Ambrose, and outscored opponents by a total of 122 to 26.

The team played its home games on Dorman Field in Fayette, Iowa.

== Schedule ==
Date	Opponent	Site	Result	Attendance	Source
October 2	at Penn (IA)	Oskaloosa, IA	W 9–0		
October 9	Buena Vista	Dorman Field; Fayette, IA	W 20–7		
October 16	Simpson	Dorman Field; Fayette, IA	W 20–0		
October 30	Columbia (IA)	Dorman Field; Fayette, IA	W 21–7		
November 5	Iowa Wesleyan	Dorman Field; Fayette, IA	W 40–6		
November 20	at Luther	Decorah, IA	W 12–6		
