= 1937 West Tennessee State Teachers football team =

American college football season

1937 West Tennessee State Teachers football
- Conference: Southern Intercollegiate Athletic Association
- Record: 3–6 (1–6 SIAA)
- Head coach: Allyn McKeen (1st season)
- Captain: Roland MacMackin
- Home stadium: Fairgrounds Stadium, Crump Stadium

1937 Southern Intercollegiate Athletic Association football standings
	Conf.					Overall
Team	W		L		T	W		L		T
Murray State $	6	–	0	–	1	8	–	1	–	1
Erskine	5	–	0	–	0	6	–	4	–	0
Centre	3	–	0	–	0	6	–	2	–	1
Western Kentucky State Teachers	3	–	0	–	1	7	–	1	–	1
Centenary	1	–	0	–	2	6	–	3	–	3
Miami (FL)	1	–	0	–	0	4	–	4	–	1
Morehead State	4	–	1	–	0	7	–	1	–	0
Louisiana Tech	3	–	1	–	2	6	–	3	–	2
Louisiana Normal	3	–	1	–	1	4	–	4	–	1
Middle Tennessee State Teachers	2	–	1	–	1	6	–	1	–	1
Mississippi State Teachers	4	–	2	–	0	7	–	3	–	0
Union (KY)	2	–	1	–	0	4	–	3	–	0
Eastern Kentucky	3	–	2	–	1	5	–	2	–	1
Rollins	3	–	2	–	0	5	–	4	–	0
Oglethorpe	3	–	3	–	0	3	–	6	–	1
SW Louisiana	2	–	3	–	1	4	–	3	–	1
Stetson	2	–	3	–	0	5	–	4	–	0
Mississippi College	2	–	3	–	1	3	–	6	–	1
Wofford	2	–	3	–	0	2	–	7	–	0
Newberry	2	–	3	–	0	2	–	8	–	0
Transylvania	2	–	4	–	0	3	–	5	–	0
Louisiana College	2	–	4	–	0	3	–	6	–	0
Millsaps	1	–	3	–	2	3	–	5	–	2
Georgetown (KY)	1	–	3	–	0	3	–	5	–	0
Louisville	1	–	3	–	1	2	–	5	–	1
Troy State	1	–	3	–	0	2	–	7	–	2
Tennessee Tech	1	–	5	–	1	3	–	5	–	1
West Tennessee State Teachers	1	–	5	–	0	3	–	6	–	0
Presbyterian	0	–	3	–	0	0	–	10	–	0
Union (TN)	0	–	5	–	1	1	–	8	–	1
$ – Conference champion

The 1937 West Tennessee State Teachers football team was an American football team that represented the West Tennessee State Teachers College (now known as the University of Memphis) as a member of the Southern Intercollegiate Athletic Association during the 1937 college football season. In their first season under head coach Allyn McKeen, West Tennessee State Teachers compiled a 3–6 record.

== Schedule ==
Date	Opponent	Site	Result	Source
September 24	at Middle Tennessee State Teachers	Horace Jones Field; Murfreesboro, TN	L 6–20	
October 2	Austin Peay*	Fairgrounds Stadium; Memphis, TN	W 26–0	
October 8	at Union (TN)	Rothrock Field; Jackson, TN	W 13–2	
October 16	Delta State	Fairgrounds Stadium; Memphis, TN	L 14–19	
October 23	at Louisiana College	Alumni Field; Pineville, LA	L 0–7	
October 29	Jacksonville State*	Fairgrounds Stadium; Memphis, TN	W 46–0	
November 5	at Murray State	Murray, KY	L 0–19	
November 12	Tennessee Tech^{†}	Crump Stadium; Memphis, TN	L 13–14	
November 19	Troy State	Crump Stadium; Memphis, TN	L 6–12	
*Non-conference game; ^{†}Homecoming
