= 1937 Miami Hurricanes football team =

American college football season

1937 Miami Hurricanes football
- Conference: Southern Intercollegiate Athletic Association
- Record: 4–4–1 (1–0 SIAA)
- Head coach: Jack Harding (1st season)
- Home stadium: Burdine Stadium

1937 Southern Intercollegiate Athletic Association football standings
	Conf.					Overall
Team	W		L		T	W		L		T
Murray State $	6	–	0	–	1	8	–	1	–	1
Erskine	5	–	0	–	0	6	–	4	–	0
Centre	3	–	0	–	0	6	–	2	–	1
Western Kentucky State Teachers	3	–	0	–	1	7	–	1	–	1
Centenary	1	–	0	–	2	6	–	3	–	3
Miami (FL)	1	–	0	–	0	4	–	4	–	1
Morehead State	4	–	1	–	0	7	–	1	–	0
Louisiana Tech	3	–	1	–	2	6	–	3	–	2
Louisiana Normal	3	–	1	–	1	4	–	4	–	1
Middle Tennessee State Teachers	2	–	1	–	1	6	–	1	–	1
Mississippi State Teachers	4	–	2	–	0	7	–	3	–	0
Union (KY)	2	–	1	–	0	4	–	3	–	0
Eastern Kentucky	3	–	2	–	1	5	–	2	–	1
Rollins	3	–	2	–	0	5	–	4	–	0
Oglethorpe	3	–	3	–	0	3	–	6	–	1
SW Louisiana	2	–	3	–	1	4	–	3	–	1
Stetson	2	–	3	–	0	5	–	4	–	0
Mississippi College	2	–	3	–	1	3	–	6	–	1
Wofford	2	–	3	–	0	2	–	7	–	0
Newberry	2	–	3	–	0	2	–	8	–	0
Transylvania	2	–	4	–	0	3	–	5	–	0
Louisiana College	2	–	4	–	0	3	–	6	–	0
Millsaps	1	–	3	–	2	3	–	5	–	2
Georgetown (KY)	1	–	3	–	0	3	–	5	–	0
Louisville	1	–	3	–	1	2	–	5	–	1
Troy State	1	–	3	–	0	2	–	7	–	2
Tennessee Tech	1	–	5	–	1	3	–	5	–	1
West Tennessee State Teachers	1	–	5	–	0	3	–	6	–	0
Presbyterian	0	–	3	–	0	0	–	10	–	0
Union (TN)	0	–	5	–	1	1	–	8	–	1
$ – Conference champion

The 1937 Miami Hurricanes football team represented the University of Miami as a member of the Southern Intercollegiate Athletic Association (SIAA) in the 1937 college football season. The Hurricanes played their home games at Burdine Stadium in Miami, Florida. The team was coached by Jack Harding, in his first year as head coach for the Hurricanes.

== Schedule ==
Date	Time	Opponent	Site	Result	Attendance	Source
October 1	8:30 p.m.	South Georgia Teachers*	Burdine Stadium; Miami, FL	W 40–0	8,000	
October 8		Spring Hill*	Burdine Stadium; Miami, FL	W 26–0		
October 15		at Bucknell*	Memorial Stadium; Lewisburg, PA	T 6–6	7,500	
October 29		at Tampa*	Phillips Field; Tampa, FL	L 0–12	7,000	
November 5	8:15 p.m.	Stetson	Burdine Stadium; Miami, FL	W 25–13	9,343	
November 12		Catholic University*	Burdine Stadium; Miami, FL	W 21–0	12,000	
November 26		Drake*	Burdine Stadium; Miami, FL	L 0–7	9,000	
December 3		South Carolina*	Burdine Stadium; Miami, FL	L 0–3	7.543	
December 10	8:15 p.m.	Georgia*	Miami Orange Bowl; Miami, FL	L 0–26	20,000	
*Non-conference game; All times are in Eastern time
