= 1937 Centenary Gentlemen football team =

American college football season

1937 Centenary Gentlemen football
- Conference: Southern Intercollegiate Athletic Association
- Record: 6–3–3 (1–0–2 SIAA)
- Head coach: Curtis Parker (4th season)
- Home stadium: Centenary Field

1937 Southern Intercollegiate Athletic Association football standings
	Conf.					Overall
Team	W		L		T	W		L		T
Murray State $	6	–	0	–	1	8	–	1	–	1
Erskine	5	–	0	–	0	6	–	4	–	0
Centre	3	–	0	–	0	6	–	2	–	1
Western Kentucky State Teachers	3	–	0	–	1	7	–	1	–	1
Centenary	1	–	0	–	2	6	–	3	–	3
Miami (FL)	1	–	0	–	0	4	–	4	–	1
Morehead State	4	–	1	–	0	7	–	1	–	0
Louisiana Tech	3	–	1	–	2	6	–	3	–	2
Louisiana Normal	3	–	1	–	1	4	–	4	–	1
Middle Tennessee State Teachers	2	–	1	–	1	6	–	1	–	1
Mississippi State Teachers	4	–	2	–	0	7	–	3	–	0
Union (KY)	2	–	1	–	0	4	–	3	–	0
Eastern Kentucky	3	–	2	–	1	5	–	2	–	1
Rollins	3	–	2	–	0	5	–	4	–	0
Oglethorpe	3	–	3	–	0	3	–	6	–	1
SW Louisiana	2	–	3	–	1	4	–	3	–	1
Stetson	2	–	3	–	0	5	–	4	–	0
Mississippi College	2	–	3	–	1	3	–	6	–	1
Wofford	2	–	3	–	0	2	–	7	–	0
Newberry	2	–	3	–	0	2	–	8	–	0
Transylvania	2	–	4	–	0	3	–	5	–	0
Louisiana College	2	–	4	–	0	3	–	6	–	0
Millsaps	1	–	3	–	2	3	–	5	–	2
Georgetown (KY)	1	–	3	–	0	3	–	5	–	0
Louisville	1	–	3	–	1	2	–	5	–	1
Troy State	1	–	3	–	0	2	–	7	–	2
Tennessee Tech	1	–	5	–	1	3	–	5	–	1
West Tennessee State Teachers	1	–	5	–	0	3	–	6	–	0
Presbyterian	0	–	3	–	0	0	–	10	–	0
Union (TN)	0	–	5	–	1	1	–	8	–	1
$ – Conference champion

The 1937 Centenary Gentlemen football team was an American football team that represented the Centenary College of Louisiana as a member of the Southern Intercollegiate Athletic Association during the 1937 college football season. In their fourth year under head coach Curtis Parker, the team compiled a 6–3–3 record.

== Schedule ==
Date	Time	Opponent	Site	Result	Attendance	Source
September 16		at Louisiana College	Alumni Field; Pineville, LA	W 39–12		
September 18	3:00 p.m.	Louisiana Normal	Centenary Field; Shreveport, LA	T 0–0	5,000	
September 24		at Oklahoma City*	Taft Stadium; Oklahoma City, OK	W 38–0	2,500	
October 2		at SMU*	Cotton Bowl; Dallas, TX	W 7–6		
October 16		Baylor*	Centenary Field; Shreveport, LA	L 0–20		
October 23		at Arizona*	Arizona Stadium; Tucson, AZ	W 18–13	9,500	
October 30		Mississippi State*	State Fair Stadium; Shreveport, LA	T 0–0	10,000	
November 6		TCU*	State Fair Stadium; Shreveport, LA	W 10–9	8,000	
November 11		at Loyola (CA)*	Los Angeles Memorial Coliseum; Los Angeles, LA	L 7–14	16,000	
November 20		Texas Tech*^{†}	State Fair Stadium; Shreveport, LA	L 2–7	7,000	
November 27		at Oklahoma A&M*	Lewis Field; Stillwater, OK	W 19–0		
December 4		at Louisiana Tech	Tech Stadium; Ruston, LA	T 7–7	6,000	
*Non-conference game; ^{†}Homecoming; All times are in Central time
