= 1937 Augustana (South Dakota) Vikings football team =

American college football season

1937 Augustana (South Dakota) Vikings football

SDIC champion
- Conference: South Dakota Intercollegiate Conference
- Record: 8–0 (4–0 SDIC)
- Head coach: Leonard A. Olson (7th season)
- Home stadium: Augustana Field

1937 South Dakota Intercollegiate Conference football standings
	Conf.					Overall
Team	W		L		T	W		L		T
Augustana (SD) $	4	–	0	–	0	8	–	0	–	0
South Dakota Mines	4	–	1	–	0	5	–	3	–	0
Southern Normal	4	–	1	–	0	5	–	3	–	0
Yankton	4	–	2	–	0	4	–	2	–	1
Northern Normal	3	–	2	–	0	4	–	5	–	0
Dakota Wesleyan	1	–	2	–	0	3	–	4	–	0
Sioux Falls	1	–	3	–	0	4	–	4	–	0
Spearfish	1	–	4	–	0	2	–	5	–	0
Huron	1	–	5	–	0	1	–	6	–	1
Eastern Normal	0	–	3	–	0	1	–	5	–	0
$ – Conference champion

The 1937 Augustana Vikings football team was an American football team that represented Augustana College (now known as Augustana University) of Sioux Falls, South Dakota, as a member of the South Dakota Intercollegiate Conference (SDIC) in the 1937 college football season. Led by Leonard A. Olson in his seventh season as head coach, the team compiled an overall record of 8–0, with a mark of 4–0 in conference play, and finished as SDIC champion.

== Schedule ==
Date	Opponent	Site	Result	Attendance	Source
September 25	Hastings*	Augustana Field; Sioux Falls, SD	W 19–13		
October 1	at Nebraska Wesleyan*	Wesleyan Bowl; Lincoln, NE	W 27–19		
October 9	Huron^{†}	Augustana Field; Sioux Falls, SD	W 36–0	2,000	
October 16	at Yankton	Crane Field; Yankton, SD	W 38–0		
October 22	at Northern Normal	Aberdeen, SD	W 25–7		
October 30	Jamestown (ND)*	Augustana Field; Sioux Falls, SD	W 31–0		
November 6	Sioux Falls	Augustana Field; Sioux Falls, SD	W 26–6		
November 12	Mankato State*	Augustana Field; Sioux Falls, SD	W 19–0		
*Non-conference game; ^{†}Homecoming
