= 1937 Middle Tennessee State Teachers Blue Raiders football team =

American college football season

1937 Middle Tennessee State Teachers Blue Raiders football
- Conference: Southern Intercollegiate Athletic Association
- Record: 6–1–1 (2–1–1 SIAA)
- Head coach: Johnny Floyd (4th season)
- Captains: Joe Troop; John Hambrick
- Home stadium: Horace Jones Field

1937 Southern Intercollegiate Athletic Association football standings
	Conf.					Overall
Team	W		L		T	W		L		T
Murray State $	6	–	0	–	1	8	–	1	–	1
Erskine	5	–	0	–	0	6	–	4	–	0
Centre	3	–	0	–	0	6	–	2	–	1
Western Kentucky State Teachers	3	–	0	–	1	7	–	1	–	1
Centenary	1	–	0	–	2	6	–	3	–	3
Miami (FL)	1	–	0	–	0	4	–	4	–	1
Morehead State	4	–	1	–	0	7	–	1	–	0
Louisiana Tech	3	–	1	–	2	6	–	3	–	2
Louisiana Normal	3	–	1	–	1	4	–	4	–	1
Middle Tennessee State Teachers	2	–	1	–	1	6	–	1	–	1
Mississippi State Teachers	4	–	2	–	0	7	–	3	–	0
Union (KY)	2	–	1	–	0	4	–	3	–	0
Eastern Kentucky	3	–	2	–	1	5	–	2	–	1
Rollins	3	–	2	–	0	5	–	4	–	0
Oglethorpe	3	–	3	–	0	3	–	6	–	1
SW Louisiana	2	–	3	–	1	4	–	3	–	1
Stetson	2	–	3	–	0	5	–	4	–	0
Mississippi College	2	–	3	–	1	3	–	6	–	1
Wofford	2	–	3	–	0	2	–	7	–	0
Newberry	2	–	3	–	0	2	–	8	–	0
Transylvania	2	–	4	–	0	3	–	5	–	0
Louisiana College	2	–	4	–	0	3	–	6	–	0
Millsaps	1	–	3	–	2	3	–	5	–	2
Georgetown (KY)	1	–	3	–	0	3	–	5	–	0
Louisville	1	–	3	–	1	2	–	5	–	1
Troy State	1	–	3	–	0	2	–	7	–	2
Tennessee Tech	1	–	5	–	1	3	–	5	–	1
West Tennessee State Teachers	1	–	5	–	0	3	–	6	–	0
Presbyterian	0	–	3	–	0	0	–	10	–	0
Union (TN)	0	–	5	–	1	1	–	8	–	1
$ – Conference champion

The 1937 Middle Tennessee State Teachers football team represented the Middle Tennessee State Teachers College (now known as Middle Tennessee State University) as a member of the Southern Intercollegiate Athletic Association (SIAA) during the 1937 college football season. Led by Johnny Floyd in his fourth season as head coach, Middle Tennessee State Teachers compiled an overall record of 6–1–1 with a mark of 2–1–1 in conference play. The team's captains were Joe Troop and John Hambrick.

== Schedule ==
Date	Opponent	Site	Result	Source
September 24	West Tennessee State Teachers	Horace Jones Field; Murfreesboro, TN	W 20–6	
October 1	at Troy State	Pace Field; Troy, AL (rivalry)	W 13–0	
October 8	Jacksonville State*	Horace Jones Field; Murfreesboro, TN	W 27–0	
October 15	at Murray State	Cutchin Stadium; Murray, KY	L 14–21	
October 27	Tennessee Tech	Horace Jones Field; Murfreesboro, TN	T 13–13	
November 5	Austin Peay*	Horace Jones Field; Murfreesboro, TN	W 19–0	
November 12	Delta State*	Horace Jones Field; Murfreesboro, TN	W 7–0	
November 25	at Tennessee Tech	Overhill Field; Cookeville, TN	W 29–0	
*Non-conference game
