= 1937 Illinois State Normal Redbirds football team =

American college football season

1937 Illinois State Normal Redbirds football

IIAC co-champion
- Conference: Illinois Intercollegiate Athletic Conference
- Record: 5–1–2 (4–0–2 IIAC)
- Head coach: Howard Hancock (7th season)
- MVP: Lavern Christensen
- Captains: Ed Lesnick; Lavern Christensen
- Home stadium: McCormick Field

1937 Illinois Intercollegiate Athletic Conference football standings
	Conf.					Overall
Team	W		L		T	W		L		T
Illinois College +	5	–	0	–	0	7	–	2	–	0
Bradley +	5	–	0	–	0	6	–	3	–	0
Illinois State Normal +	4	–	0	–	2	5	–	1	–	2
St. Viator	2	–	0	–	1	6	–	2	–	1
Monmouth (IL)	1	–	0	–	3	4	–	1	–	4
Augustana (IL)	4	–	1	–	1	5	–	2	–	1
Western Illinois	3	–	1	–	1	3	–	4	–	1
Knox (IL)	2	–	1	–	1	3	–	4	–	1
Illinois Wesleyan	3	–	2	–	1	5	–	3	–	1
Northern Illinois State	3	–	2	–	1	3	–	2	–	3
Lake Forest	1	–	1	–	1	3	–	1	–	2
Wheaton (IL)	3	–	3	–	0	3	–	5	–	0
Shurtleff	1	–	1	–	0	1	–	5	–	0
Elmhurst	2	–	3	–	1	3	–	3	–	2
McKendree	2	–	3	–	1	3	–	5	–	1
Southern Illinois	2	–	4	–	0	2	–	7	–	0
North Central	1	–	2	–	3	1	–	3	–	3
Eastern Illinois	1	–	4	–	1	3	–	4	–	1
Carthage	1	–	5	–	0	1	–	6	–	0
Eureka	0	–	6	–	0	0	–	6	–	0
Millikin	0	–	7	–	0	0	–	9	–	0
+ – Conference co-champions

The 1937 Illinois State Normal Redbirds football team represented Illinois State Normal University—now known as Illinois State University—as a member of the Illinois Intercollegiate Athletic Conference (IIAC) during the 1937 college football season. Led by seventh-year head coach Howard Hancock, the Redbirds compiled an overall record of 5–1–2 with a mark of 4–0–2 in conference play. Illinois State Normal claimed a share of the IIAC championship along with Bradley and Illinois College, although the latter teams did not have any ties. The team played home games at McCormick Field in Normal, Illinois.

== Schedule ==
Date	Opponent	Site	Result	Source
September 25	Indiana State*	McCormick Field; Normal, IL	W 21–0	
October 2	Platteville State*	McCormick Field; Normal, IL	L 9–12	
October 9	at Northern Illinois State	Glidden Field; DeKalb, IL	W 14–2	
October 16	at Western Illinois	Morgan Field; Macomb, IL	T 0–0	
October 23	at Eastern Illinois	Charleston, IL (rivalry)	T 0–0	
October 30	Southern Illinois^{†}	McCormick Field; Normal, IL	W 13–6	
November 13	Eureka	McCormick Field; Normal, IL	W 80–0	
November 20	Elmhurst	McCormick Field; Normal, IL	W 12–6	
*Non-conference game; ^{†}Homecoming
