= 1937 Millsaps Majors football team =

American college football season

1937 Millsaps Majors football
- Conference: Dixie Conference, Southern Intercollegiate Athletic Association
- Record: 3–5–2 (1–3–1 Dixie, 1–3–2 SIAA)
- Head coach: Tranny Lee Gaddy (7th season)
- Home stadium: Municipal Stadium; Tiger Stadium

1937 Dixie Conference football standings
	Conf.					Overall
Team	W		L		T	W		L		T
Birmingham–Southern $	6	–	1	–	0	6	–	2	–	0
Howard (AL)	4	–	1	–	0	5	–	3	–	0
Southwestern (TN)	4	–	1	–	0	6	–	4	–	0
Mississippi College	2	–	1	–	1	3	–	6	–	1
Chattanooga	2	–	3	–	0	4	–	3	–	2
Loyola (LA)	1	–	2	–	0	2	–	6	–	1
Millsaps	1	–	3	–	1	3	–	5	–	2
Mercer	0	–	3	–	0	4	–	5	–	0
Spring Hill	0	–	5	–	0	1	–	10	–	0
$ – Conference champion

1937 Southern Intercollegiate Athletic Association football standings
	Conf.					Overall
Team	W		L		T	W		L		T
Murray State $	6	–	0	–	1	8	–	1	–	1
Erskine	5	–	0	–	0	6	–	4	–	0
Centre	3	–	0	–	0	6	–	2	–	1
Western Kentucky State Teachers	3	–	0	–	1	7	–	1	–	1
Centenary	1	–	0	–	2	6	–	3	–	3
Miami (FL)	1	–	0	–	0	4	–	4	–	1
Morehead State	4	–	1	–	0	7	–	1	–	0
Louisiana Tech	3	–	1	–	2	6	–	3	–	2
Louisiana Normal	3	–	1	–	1	4	–	4	–	1
Middle Tennessee State Teachers	2	–	1	–	1	6	–	1	–	1
Mississippi State Teachers	4	–	2	–	0	7	–	3	–	0
Union (KY)	2	–	1	–	0	4	–	3	–	0
Eastern Kentucky	3	–	2	–	1	5	–	2	–	1
Rollins	3	–	2	–	0	5	–	4	–	0
Oglethorpe	3	–	3	–	0	3	–	6	–	1
SW Louisiana	2	–	3	–	1	4	–	3	–	1
Stetson	2	–	3	–	0	5	–	4	–	0
Mississippi College	2	–	3	–	1	3	–	6	–	1
Wofford	2	–	3	–	0	2	–	7	–	0
Newberry	2	–	3	–	0	2	–	8	–	0
Transylvania	2	–	4	–	0	3	–	5	–	0
Louisiana College	2	–	4	–	0	3	–	6	–	0
Millsaps	1	–	3	–	2	3	–	5	–	2
Georgetown (KY)	1	–	3	–	0	3	–	5	–	0
Louisville	1	–	3	–	1	2	–	5	–	1
Troy State	1	–	3	–	0	2	–	7	–	2
Tennessee Tech	1	–	5	–	1	3	–	5	–	1
West Tennessee State Teachers	1	–	5	–	0	3	–	6	–	0
Presbyterian	0	–	3	–	0	0	–	10	–	0
Union (TN)	0	–	5	–	1	1	–	8	–	1
$ – Conference champion

The 1937 Millsaps Majors football team was an American football team that represented Millsaps College as a member of the Dixie Conference and the Southern Intercollegiate Athletic Association (SIAA) in the 1937 college football season. Led by Tranny Lee Gaddy in his seventh season as head coach, the team compiled an overall record of 3–5–2, with a mark of 1–3–1 in Dixie and 1–3–2 in SIAA conference play.

== Schedule ==
Date	Time	Opponent	Site	Result	Attendance	Source
September 17		at Union (TN)	Union Field; Jackson, TN	T 0–0		
September 25		Pensacola Naval Air Station*	Municipal Stadium; Jackson, MS	W 7–0		
October 2		at Southwestern (TN)	Mid-South Fairgrounds; Memphis, TN	L 0–14		
October 8		at Louisiana Tech	Tech Stadium; Ruston, LA	L 0–7		
October 16		vs. Mississippi College	Municipal Stadium; Jackson, MS (rivalry)	T 0–0	3,000	
October 22	8:00 p.m.	Southwestern Louisiana	Municipal Stadium; Jackson, MS	L 0–7		
October 29		Birmingham–Southern	Tiger Stadium; Jackson, MS	L 7–12		
November 6		Spring Hill	Tiger Stadium; Jackson, MS	W 9–6		
November 12		at Rollins	League Field; Lakeland, FL	W 13–12		
November 20		vs. Mississippi College	Municipal Stadium; Jackson, MS (rivalry)	L 0–12		
*Non-conference game; All times are in Central time
