= 1937 Louisiana Normal Demons football team =

American college football season

1937 Louisiana Normal Demons football
- Conference: Southern Intercollegiate Athletic Association
- Record: 4–4–1 (3–1–1 SIAA)
- Head coach: Harry Turpin (3th season)
- Home stadium: Normal Field

1937 Southern Intercollegiate Athletic Association football standings
	Conf.					Overall
Team	W		L		T	W		L		T
Murray State $	6	–	0	–	1	8	–	1	–	1
Erskine	5	–	0	–	0	6	–	4	–	0
Centre	3	–	0	–	0	6	–	2	–	1
Western Kentucky State Teachers	3	–	0	–	1	7	–	1	–	1
Centenary	1	–	0	–	2	6	–	3	–	3
Miami (FL)	1	–	0	–	0	4	–	4	–	1
Morehead State	4	–	1	–	0	7	–	1	–	0
Louisiana Tech	3	–	1	–	2	6	–	3	–	2
Louisiana Normal	3	–	1	–	1	4	–	4	–	1
Middle Tennessee State Teachers	2	–	1	–	1	6	–	1	–	1
Mississippi State Teachers	4	–	2	–	0	7	–	3	–	0
Union (KY)	2	–	1	–	0	4	–	3	–	0
Eastern Kentucky	3	–	2	–	1	5	–	2	–	1
Rollins	3	–	2	–	0	5	–	4	–	0
Oglethorpe	3	–	3	–	0	3	–	6	–	1
SW Louisiana	2	–	3	–	1	4	–	3	–	1
Stetson	2	–	3	–	0	5	–	4	–	0
Mississippi College	2	–	3	–	1	3	–	6	–	1
Wofford	2	–	3	–	0	2	–	7	–	0
Newberry	2	–	3	–	0	2	–	8	–	0
Transylvania	2	–	4	–	0	3	–	5	–	0
Louisiana College	2	–	4	–	0	3	–	6	–	0
Millsaps	1	–	3	–	2	3	–	5	–	2
Georgetown (KY)	1	–	3	–	0	3	–	5	–	0
Louisville	1	–	3	–	1	2	–	5	–	1
Troy State	1	–	3	–	0	2	–	7	–	2
Tennessee Tech	1	–	5	–	1	3	–	5	–	1
West Tennessee State Teachers	1	–	5	–	0	3	–	6	–	0
Presbyterian	0	–	3	–	0	0	–	10	–	0
Union (TN)	0	–	5	–	1	1	–	8	–	1
$ – Conference champion

The 1937 Louisiana Normal Demons football team represented the Louisiana State Normal College—now known as Northwestern State University—as a member the Southern Intercollegiate Athletic Association (SIAA) during the 1937 college football season. Led by fourth-year head coach Harry Turpin, the Demons compiled an overall record of 4–4–1 with a mark of 3–1–1 in conference play.

== Schedule ==
Date	Time	Opponent	Site	Result	Attendance	Source
September 18	3:00 p.m.	at Centenary*	Centenary Field; Shreveport, LA	T 0–0	5,000	
September 24	7:45 p.m.	at East Texas State*	Commerce, TX	L 6–27		
October 8		Sam Houston State*	Normal Field; Natchitoches, LA	W 7–6	3,000	
October 16	8:00 p.m.	Louisiana College	Normal Field; Natchitoches, LA	W 12–6		
October 23	2:30 p.m.	vs. Louisiana Tech	State Fair Stadium; Shreveport, LA (rivalry)	L 0–14	7,500	
November 5	8:00 p.m.	Stephen F. Austin*	Normal Field; Natchitoches, LA (rivalry)	L 0–2		
November 13	2:30 p.m.	at Mississippi State Teachers	Faulkner Field; Hattiesburg, MS	W 12–26	5,000	
November 20		at No. 8 LSU*	Tiger Stadium; Baton Rouge, LA	L 0–52	5,000	
November 25	2:30 p.m.	Southwestern Louisiana^{†}	Normal Field; Natchitoches, LA	W 7–0	4,000	
*Non-conference game; ^{†}Homecoming; Rankings from AP Poll released prior to the game; All times are in Central time
