= 1937 Murray State Thoroughbreds football team =

American college football season

1937 Murray State Thoroughbreds football

SIAA champion
- Conference: Southern Intercollegiate Athletic Association
- Record: 8–1–1 (6–0–1 SIAA)
- Head coach: Roy Stewart (6th season)

1937 Southern Intercollegiate Athletic Association football standings
	Conf.					Overall
Team	W		L		T	W		L		T
Murray State $	6	–	0	–	1	8	–	1	–	1
Erskine	5	–	0	–	0	6	–	4	–	0
Centre	3	–	0	–	0	6	–	2	–	1
Western Kentucky State Teachers	3	–	0	–	1	7	–	1	–	1
Centenary	1	–	0	–	2	6	–	3	–	3
Miami (FL)	1	–	0	–	0	4	–	4	–	1
Morehead State	4	–	1	–	0	7	–	1	–	0
Louisiana Tech	3	–	1	–	2	6	–	3	–	2
Louisiana Normal	3	–	1	–	1	4	–	4	–	1
Middle Tennessee State Teachers	2	–	1	–	1	6	–	1	–	1
Mississippi State Teachers	4	–	2	–	0	7	–	3	–	0
Union (KY)	2	–	1	–	0	4	–	3	–	0
Eastern Kentucky	3	–	2	–	1	5	–	2	–	1
Rollins	3	–	2	–	0	5	–	4	–	0
Oglethorpe	3	–	3	–	0	3	–	6	–	1
SW Louisiana	2	–	3	–	1	4	–	3	–	1
Stetson	2	–	3	–	0	5	–	4	–	0
Mississippi College	2	–	3	–	1	3	–	6	–	1
Wofford	2	–	3	–	0	2	–	7	–	0
Newberry	2	–	3	–	0	2	–	8	–	0
Transylvania	2	–	4	–	0	3	–	5	–	0
Louisiana College	2	–	4	–	0	3	–	6	–	0
Millsaps	1	–	3	–	2	3	–	5	–	2
Georgetown (KY)	1	–	3	–	0	3	–	5	–	0
Louisville	1	–	3	–	1	2	–	5	–	1
Troy State	1	–	3	–	0	2	–	7	–	2
Tennessee Tech	1	–	5	–	1	3	–	5	–	1
West Tennessee State Teachers	1	–	5	–	0	3	–	6	–	0
Presbyterian	0	–	3	–	0	0	–	10	–	0
Union (TN)	0	–	5	–	1	1	–	8	–	1
$ – Conference champion

The 1937 Murray State Thoroughbreds football team represented Murray State University in the 1937 college football season. The team won its second Southern Intercollegiate Athletic Association title, finishing the season with an 8–1–1 record and a 6–0–1 mark in conference play.

== Schedule ==
Date	Opponent	Site	Result	Source
September 25	at Hardin–Simmons*	Abilene, TX	L 0–21	
October 2	Tennessee Tech	Murray, KY	W 23–0	
October 9	at Ouachita Baptist*	Arkadelphia, AR	W 27–7	
October 15	Middle Tennessee State Teachers	Murray, KY	W 21–14	
October 23	Mississippi College^{†}	Murray, KY	W 43–0	
October 29	vs. Union (TN)	Dyersburg, TN	W 21–0	
November 5	West Tennessee State Teachers	Murray, KY	W 19–0	
November 12	Morehead State	Murray, KY	W 32–7	
November 20	Western Kentucky State Teachers	Murray, KY	T 7–7	
November 24	Superior State*	Murray, KY	W 26–6	
*Non-conference game; ^{†}Homecoming
