= 1937 North Texas State Teachers Eagles football team =

American college football season

1937 North Texas State Teachers Eagles football
- Conference: Lone Star Conference
- Record: 4–4–2 (2–1–1 LSC)
- Head coach: Jack Sisco (9th season)
- Home stadium: Eagle Field

1937 Lone Star Conference football standings
	Conf.					Overall
Team	W		L		T	W		L		T
East Texas State $	4	–	0	–	0	8	–	2	–	0
North Texas State	2	–	1	–	1	4	–	4	–	2
Southwest Texas State	2	–	2	–	0	6	–	4	–	0
Sam Houston State	1	–	3	–	0	5	–	5	–	0
Stephen F. Austin	0	–	3	–	1	1	–	6	–	1
$ – Conference champion

The 1937 North Texas State Teachers Eagles football team was an American football team that represented the North Texas State Teachers College (now known as the University of North Texas) during the 1937 college football season as a member of the Lone Star Conference. In their ninth year under head coach Jack Sisco, the team compiled a 4–4–2 record.

== Schedule ==
Date	Opponent	Site	Result	Source
September 18	Austin*	Eagle Field; Denton, TX	L 0–6	
September 25	at SMU*	Ownby Stadium; University Park, TX (rivalry)	L 3–14	
October 1	Southwestern (TX)*	Eagle Field; Denton, TX	L 6–7	
October 8	Abilene Christian*	Eagle Field; Denton, TX	W 22–14	
October 16	at McMurry*	Abilene, TX	T 0–0	
October 23	at Stephen F. Austin	Nacogdoches, TX	T 6–6	
October 29	Sam Houston State	Eagle Field; Denton, TX	W 13–6	
November 5	at Southwest Texas State	Evans Field; San Marcos, TX	W 10–3	
November 12	Trinity (TX)*	Eagle Field; Denton, TX	W 14–7	
November 20	East Texas State	Eagle Field; Denton, TX	L 0–20	
*Non-conference game
