= 1937 Troy State Red Wave football team =

American college football season

1937 Troy State Red Wave football
- Conference: Southern Intercollegiate Athletic Association
- Record: 2–7–2 (1–3 SIAA)
- Head coach: Albert Choate (1st season)
- Home stadium: Pace Field

1937 Southern Intercollegiate Athletic Association football standings
	Conf.					Overall
Team	W		L		T	W		L		T
Murray State $	6	–	0	–	1	8	–	1	–	1
Erskine	5	–	0	–	0	6	–	4	–	0
Centre	3	–	0	–	0	6	–	2	–	1
Western Kentucky State Teachers	3	–	0	–	1	7	–	1	–	1
Centenary	1	–	0	–	2	6	–	3	–	3
Miami (FL)	1	–	0	–	0	4	–	4	–	1
Morehead State	4	–	1	–	0	7	–	1	–	0
Louisiana Tech	3	–	1	–	2	6	–	3	–	2
Louisiana Normal	3	–	1	–	1	4	–	4	–	1
Middle Tennessee State Teachers	2	–	1	–	1	6	–	1	–	1
Mississippi State Teachers	4	–	2	–	0	7	–	3	–	0
Union (KY)	2	–	1	–	0	4	–	3	–	0
Eastern Kentucky	3	–	2	–	1	5	–	2	–	1
Rollins	3	–	2	–	0	5	–	4	–	0
Oglethorpe	3	–	3	–	0	3	–	6	–	1
SW Louisiana	2	–	3	–	1	4	–	3	–	1
Stetson	2	–	3	–	0	5	–	4	–	0
Mississippi College	2	–	3	–	1	3	–	6	–	1
Wofford	2	–	3	–	0	2	–	7	–	0
Newberry	2	–	3	–	0	2	–	8	–	0
Transylvania	2	–	4	–	0	3	–	5	–	0
Louisiana College	2	–	4	–	0	3	–	6	–	0
Millsaps	1	–	3	–	2	3	–	5	–	2
Georgetown (KY)	1	–	3	–	0	3	–	5	–	0
Louisville	1	–	3	–	1	2	–	5	–	1
Troy State	1	–	3	–	0	2	–	7	–	2
Tennessee Tech	1	–	5	–	1	3	–	5	–	1
West Tennessee State Teachers	1	–	5	–	0	3	–	6	–	0
Presbyterian	0	–	3	–	0	0	–	10	–	0
Union (TN)	0	–	5	–	1	1	–	8	–	1
$ – Conference champion

The 1937 Troy State Red Wave football team represented Troy State Teachers College (now known as Troy University) as a member of the Southern Intercollegiate Athletic Association (SIAA) during the 1937 college football season. Led by first-year head coach Albert Choate, the Red Wave compiled an overall record of 2–7–2, with a mark of 1–3 in conference play, and finished in 26th place in the SIAA. Choate was hired to succeed Albert Elmore as both athletic director and head football coach in May 1937.

== Schedule ==
Date	Opponent	Site	Result	Source
September 24	at South Georgia*	Douglas, GA	T 0–0	
October 1	Middle Tennessee State	Pace Field; Troy, AL (rivalry)	L 0–13	
October 8	Marion*	Pace Field; Troy, AL	L 6–13	
October 16	at South Georgia Teachers*	Statesboro, GA	W 12–6	
October 23	at Delta State*	Delta Field; Cleveland, MS	L 0–13	
October 29	at Mississippi State Teachers	Faulkner Field; Hattiesburg, MS	L 0–53	
November 5	at Newberry	Setzler Field; Newberry, SC	L 6–19	
November 13	at Pensacola NAS*	Legion Field; Pensacola, FL	L 0–38	
November 19	at West Tennessee State	Crump Stadium; Memphis, TN	W 12–6	
November 25	Cumberland (TN)*	Pace Field; Troy, AL	T 0–0	
December 4	vs. SW Mississippi Junior College*	Pearson Bowl; Alexander City, AL	L 7–13	
*Non-conference game
