= 1937 Oglethorpe Stormy Petrels football team =

American college football season

1937 Oglethorpe Stormy Petrels football
- Conference: Southern Intercollegiate Athletic Association
- Record: 3–6–1 (3–3 SIAA)
- Head coach: John W. Patrick (4th season)
- Home stadium: Hermance Stadium

1937 Southern Intercollegiate Athletic Association football standings
	Conf.					Overall
Team	W		L		T	W		L		T
Murray State $	6	–	0	–	1	8	–	1	–	1
Erskine	5	–	0	–	0	6	–	4	–	0
Centre	3	–	0	–	0	6	–	2	–	1
Western Kentucky State Teachers	3	–	0	–	1	7	–	1	–	1
Centenary	1	–	0	–	2	6	–	3	–	3
Miami (FL)	1	–	0	–	0	4	–	4	–	1
Morehead State	4	–	1	–	0	7	–	1	–	0
Louisiana Tech	3	–	1	–	2	6	–	3	–	2
Louisiana Normal	3	–	1	–	1	4	–	4	–	1
Middle Tennessee State Teachers	2	–	1	–	1	6	–	1	–	1
Mississippi State Teachers	4	–	2	–	0	7	–	3	–	0
Union (KY)	2	–	1	–	0	4	–	3	–	0
Eastern Kentucky	3	–	2	–	1	5	–	2	–	1
Rollins	3	–	2	–	0	5	–	4	–	0
Oglethorpe	3	–	3	–	0	3	–	6	–	1
SW Louisiana	2	–	3	–	1	4	–	3	–	1
Stetson	2	–	3	–	0	5	–	4	–	0
Mississippi College	2	–	3	–	1	3	–	6	–	1
Wofford	2	–	3	–	0	2	–	7	–	0
Newberry	2	–	3	–	0	2	–	8	–	0
Transylvania	2	–	4	–	0	3	–	5	–	0
Louisiana College	2	–	4	–	0	3	–	6	–	0
Millsaps	1	–	3	–	2	3	–	5	–	2
Georgetown (KY)	1	–	3	–	0	3	–	5	–	0
Louisville	1	–	3	–	1	2	–	5	–	1
Troy State	1	–	3	–	0	2	–	7	–	2
Tennessee Tech	1	–	5	–	1	3	–	5	–	1
West Tennessee State Teachers	1	–	5	–	0	3	–	6	–	0
Presbyterian	0	–	3	–	0	0	–	10	–	0
Union (TN)	0	–	5	–	1	1	–	8	–	1
$ – Conference champion

The 1937 Oglethorpe Stormy Petrels football team was an American football team that represented Oglethorpe University as a member of the Southern Intercollegiate Athletic Association (SIAA) during the 1937 college football season. In their fourth year under head coach John W. Patrick, the Stormy Petrels compiled an overall record of 3–6–1 with a mark of 3–3 in conference play, placing 15th in the SIAA. The team played home games at Hermance Stadium in North Atlanta, Georgia.

== Schedule ==
Date	Time	Opponent	Site	Result	Attendance	Source
September 25		at Georgia*	Sanford Stadium; Athens, GA	L 0–60	5,000	
October 2	3:00 p.m.	at Centre	Farris Stadium; Danville, KY	L 0–19		
October 9		at Wofford	Snyder Field; Spartanburg, SC	W 7–0	1,000	
October 15		at Chattanooga*	Chamberlain Field; Chattanooga, TN	T 0–0		
October 22		at Erskine	Anderson Jr. High Stadium; Anderson, SC	L 0–6		
October 29		at Mercer*	Centennial Stadium; Macon, GA	L 6–13		
November 5		at Rollins	Tinker Field; Orlando, FL	L 0–34		
November 13		Mississippi College^{†}	Hermance Stadium; North Atlanta, GA	W 12–0	1,500	
November 20		Stetson	Hermance Stadium; North Atlanta, GA	W 10–0		
November 25		at The Citadel*	Johnson Hagood Stadium; Charleston, SC	L 6–7		
*Non-conference game; ^{†}Homecoming; All times are in Eastern time
