= 1937 Louisville Cardinals football team =

American college football season

1937 Louisville Cardinals football
- Conference: Kentucky Intercollegiate Athletic Conference, Southern Intercollegiate Athletic Association
- Record: 2–5–1 (0–3–1 KIAC, 1–3–1 SIAA)
- Head coach: Laurie Apitz (2nd season)
- Home stadium: Maxwell Field

1937 Kentucky Intercollegiate Athletic Conference football standings
	Conf.					Overall
Team	W		L		T	W		L		T
Centre $	2	–	0	–	0	6	–	2	–	1
Murray State	1	–	0	–	1	8	–	1	–	1
Western Kentucky State Teachers	1	–	0	–	1	7	–	1	–	1
Morehead State	3	–	1	–	0	7	–	1	–	0
Union (KY)	2	–	1	–	0	4	–	3	–	0
Eastern Kentucky	2	–	2	–	1	5	–	2	–	1
Transylvania	2	–	4	–	0	3	–	5	–	0
Georgetown (KY)	1	–	3	–	0	3	–	5	–	0
Louisville	0	–	3	–	1	2	–	5	–	1
$ – Conference champion

1937 Southern Intercollegiate Athletic Association football standings
	Conf.					Overall
Team	W		L		T	W		L		T
Murray State $	6	–	0	–	1	8	–	1	–	1
Erskine	5	–	0	–	0	6	–	4	–	0
Centre	3	–	0	–	0	6	–	2	–	1
Western Kentucky State Teachers	3	–	0	–	1	7	–	1	–	1
Centenary	1	–	0	–	2	6	–	3	–	3
Miami (FL)	1	–	0	–	0	4	–	4	–	1
Morehead State	4	–	1	–	0	7	–	1	–	0
Louisiana Tech	3	–	1	–	2	6	–	3	–	2
Louisiana Normal	3	–	1	–	1	4	–	4	–	1
Middle Tennessee State Teachers	2	–	1	–	1	6	–	1	–	1
Mississippi State Teachers	4	–	2	–	0	7	–	3	–	0
Union (KY)	2	–	1	–	0	4	–	3	–	0
Eastern Kentucky	3	–	2	–	1	5	–	2	–	1
Rollins	3	–	2	–	0	5	–	4	–	0
Oglethorpe	3	–	3	–	0	3	–	6	–	1
SW Louisiana	2	–	3	–	1	4	–	3	–	1
Stetson	2	–	3	–	0	5	–	4	–	0
Mississippi College	2	–	3	–	1	3	–	6	–	1
Wofford	2	–	3	–	0	2	–	7	–	0
Newberry	2	–	3	–	0	2	–	8	–	0
Transylvania	2	–	4	–	0	3	–	5	–	0
Louisiana College	2	–	4	–	0	3	–	6	–	0
Millsaps	1	–	3	–	2	3	–	5	–	2
Georgetown (KY)	1	–	3	–	0	3	–	5	–	0
Louisville	1	–	3	–	1	2	–	5	–	1
Troy State	1	–	3	–	0	2	–	7	–	2
Tennessee Tech	1	–	5	–	1	3	–	5	–	1
West Tennessee State Teachers	1	–	5	–	0	3	–	6	–	0
Presbyterian	0	–	3	–	0	0	–	10	–	0
Union (TN)	0	–	5	–	1	1	–	8	–	1
$ – Conference champion

The 1937 Louisville Cardinals football team was an American football team that represented the University of Louisville as a member of the Kentucky Intercollegiate Athletic Conference (KIAC) and the Southern Intercollegiate Athletic Association (SIAA) during the 1937 college football season. In their second season under head coach Laurie Apitz, the Cardinals compiled an overall record of 2–5–1 record with marks of 0–3–1 in KIAC play and of 1–3–1 against SIAA opponents.

== Schedule ==
Date	Time	Opponent	Site	Result	Attendance	Source
September 25		Hanover*	Maxwell Field; Louisville, KY	L 7–13		
October 2		at Transylvania	Lexington, KY	L 6–19		
October 9		at Wayne*	Roosevelt Field; Detroit, MI	L 0–32	2,500	
October 15	8:15 p.m.	Union (TN)	Maxwell Field; Louisville, KY	W 14–6	2,000	
October 23	8:15 p.m.	Saint Joseph's (IN)*	Maxwell Field; Louisville, KY	W 13–6	1,800	
October 30		at Georgetown (KY)	Georgetown, KY	L 7–12		
November 11	2:15 p.m.	Centre	Maxwell Field; Louisville, KY	L 7–20		
November 20	12:30 p.m.	Eastern Kentucky	Maxwell Field; Louisville, KY	T 6–6	1,000	
*Non-conference game; All times are in Central time
