= 1937 Mississippi State Teachers Yellow Jackets football team =

American college football season

1937 Mississippi State Teachers Yellow Jackets football

Doll & Toy Charity Game, W 7–0 vs. Appalachian State
- Conference: Southern Intercollegiate Athletic Association
- Record: 7–3 (5–2 SIAA)
- Head coach: Reed Green (1st season)
- Home stadium: Faulkner Field

1937 Southern Intercollegiate Athletic Association football standings
	Conf.					Overall
Team	W		L		T	W		L		T
Murray State $	6	–	0	–	1	8	–	1	–	1
Erskine	5	–	0	–	0	6	–	4	–	0
Centre	3	–	0	–	0	6	–	2	–	1
Western Kentucky State Teachers	3	–	0	–	1	7	–	1	–	1
Centenary	1	–	0	–	2	6	–	3	–	3
Miami (FL)	1	–	0	–	0	4	–	4	–	1
Morehead State	4	–	1	–	0	7	–	1	–	0
Louisiana Tech	3	–	1	–	2	6	–	3	–	2
Louisiana Normal	3	–	1	–	1	4	–	4	–	1
Middle Tennessee State Teachers	2	–	1	–	1	6	–	1	–	1
Mississippi State Teachers	4	–	2	–	0	7	–	3	–	0
Union (KY)	2	–	1	–	0	4	–	3	–	0
Eastern Kentucky	3	–	2	–	1	5	–	2	–	1
Rollins	3	–	2	–	0	5	–	4	–	0
Oglethorpe	3	–	3	–	0	3	–	6	–	1
SW Louisiana	2	–	3	–	1	4	–	3	–	1
Stetson	2	–	3	–	0	5	–	4	–	0
Mississippi College	2	–	3	–	1	3	–	6	–	1
Wofford	2	–	3	–	0	2	–	7	–	0
Newberry	2	–	3	–	0	2	–	8	–	0
Transylvania	2	–	4	–	0	3	–	5	–	0
Louisiana College	2	–	4	–	0	3	–	6	–	0
Millsaps	1	–	3	–	2	3	–	5	–	2
Georgetown (KY)	1	–	3	–	0	3	–	5	–	0
Louisville	1	–	3	–	1	2	–	5	–	1
Troy State	1	–	3	–	0	2	–	7	–	2
Tennessee Tech	1	–	5	–	1	3	–	5	–	1
West Tennessee State Teachers	1	–	5	–	0	3	–	6	–	0
Presbyterian	0	–	3	–	0	0	–	10	–	0
Union (TN)	0	–	5	–	1	1	–	8	–	1
$ – Conference champion

The 1937 Mississippi State Teachers Yellow Jackets football team was an American football team that represented the Mississippi State Teachers College (now known as the University of Southern Mississippi) as a member of the Southern Intercollegiate Athletic Association during the 1937 college football season. In their first year under head coach Reed Green, the team compiled a 7–3 record.

== Schedule ==
Date	Time	Opponent	Site	Result	Attendance	Source
September 24		Louisiana College	Faulkner Field; Hattiesburg, MS	W 19–0		
October 1		at Spring Hill*	Dorn Stadium; Mobile, AL	W 33–0		
October 8		at Southwestern Louisiana	Campus Athletic Field; Lafayette, LA	W 13–0		
October 15		at Louisiana Tech	Tech Stadium; Ruston, LA (rivalry)	L 0–7	3,000	
October 23		Jacksonville State	Faulkner Field; Hattiesburg, MS	W 58–0		
October 29		Troy State	Faulkner Field; Hattiesburg, MS	W 53–0		
November 5		Union (TN)	Faulkner Field; Hattiesburg, MS	W 34–0		
November 13	2:30 p.m.	Louisiana Normal^{†}	Faulkner Field; Hattiesburg, MS	L 0–3	5,000	
November 25		at East Texas State*	Commerce, TX	L 6–14		
December 3		Appalachian State*	Gulfport, MS (Doll & Toy Charity Game)	W 7–0		
*Non-conference game; ^{†}Homecoming; All times are in Central time
