= 1937 Southwestern Louisiana Bulldogs football team =

American college football season

1937 Southwestern Louisiana Bulldogs football
- Conference: Southern Intercollegiate Athletic Association
- Record: 4–3–1 (2–3–1 SIAA)
- Head coach: Johnny Cain (1st season)
- Home stadium: Campus Athletic Field

1937 Southern Intercollegiate Athletic Association football standings
	Conf.					Overall
Team	W		L		T	W		L		T
Murray State $	6	–	0	–	1	8	–	1	–	1
Erskine	5	–	0	–	0	6	–	4	–	0
Centre	3	–	0	–	0	6	–	2	–	1
Western Kentucky State Teachers	3	–	0	–	1	7	–	1	–	1
Centenary	1	–	0	–	2	6	–	3	–	3
Miami (FL)	1	–	0	–	0	4	–	4	–	1
Morehead State	4	–	1	–	0	7	–	1	–	0
Louisiana Tech	3	–	1	–	2	6	–	3	–	2
Louisiana Normal	3	–	1	–	1	4	–	4	–	1
Middle Tennessee State Teachers	2	–	1	–	1	6	–	1	–	1
Mississippi State Teachers	4	–	2	–	0	7	–	3	–	0
Union (KY)	2	–	1	–	0	4	–	3	–	0
Eastern Kentucky	3	–	2	–	1	5	–	2	–	1
Rollins	3	–	2	–	0	5	–	4	–	0
Oglethorpe	3	–	3	–	0	3	–	6	–	1
SW Louisiana	2	–	3	–	1	4	–	3	–	1
Stetson	2	–	3	–	0	5	–	4	–	0
Mississippi College	2	–	3	–	1	3	–	6	–	1
Wofford	2	–	3	–	0	2	–	7	–	0
Newberry	2	–	3	–	0	2	–	8	–	0
Transylvania	2	–	4	–	0	3	–	5	–	0
Louisiana College	2	–	4	–	0	3	–	6	–	0
Millsaps	1	–	3	–	2	3	–	5	–	2
Georgetown (KY)	1	–	3	–	0	3	–	5	–	0
Louisville	1	–	3	–	1	2	–	5	–	1
Troy State	1	–	3	–	0	2	–	7	–	2
Tennessee Tech	1	–	5	–	1	3	–	5	–	1
West Tennessee State Teachers	1	–	5	–	0	3	–	6	–	0
Presbyterian	0	–	3	–	0	0	–	10	–	0
Union (TN)	0	–	5	–	1	1	–	8	–	1
$ – Conference champion

The 1937 Southwestern Louisiana Bulldogs football team was an American football team that represented the Southwestern Louisiana Institute of Liberal and Technical Learning (now known as the University of Louisiana at Lafayette) in the Southern Intercollegiate Athletic Association during the 1937 college football season. In their first year under head coach Johnny Cain, the team compiled a 4–3–1 record.

== Schedule ==
Date	Time	Opponent	Site	Result	Attendance	Source
September 25		at Mississippi College	Provine Field; Clinton, MS	L 0–13		
October 1		Stephen F. Austin*	Campus Athletic Field; Lafayette, LA	W 7–6		
October 8		Mississippi State Teachers	Campus Athletic Field; Lafayette, LA	L 0–13		
October 15		Spring Hill*	Campus Athletic Field; Lafayette, LA	W 19–6		
October 22	8:00 p.m.	at Millsaps	Municipal Stadium; Jackson, MS	W 7–0		
October 29		Louisiana College	Campus Athletic Field; Lafayette, LA	W 26–6		
November 12		at Louisiana Tech	Tech Stadium; Ruston, LA (rivalry)	T 0–0		
November 25	2:30 p.m.	at Louisiana Normal	Normal Field; Natchitoches, LA	L 0–7	4,000	
*Non-conference game; All times are in Central time
