= Curtis Parker =

American football and basketball player and coach (1901–1982)

Biographical details
- Born: August 7, 1901; Wilmar, Arkansas, U.S.
- Died: April 19, 1982 (aged); Shreveport, Louisiana, U.S.

Playing career

Football
- 1924–1925: Arkansas

Basketball
- 1923–1924: Arkansas
- 1925–1926: Arkansas
- Positions: End (football); Guard (basketball)

Coaching career (HC unless noted)

Football
- 1926–1928: Centenary (freshmen)
- 1929–1933: Centenary (AHC)
- 1934–1939: Centenary

Basketball
- 1927–1939: Centenary

Administrative career (AD unless noted)
- 1934–1940: Centenary

Head coaching record
- Overall: 37–27–6 (football); 140–82 (basketball)

Accomplishments and honors

Awards
- Football; All-Southwest (1925)

Curtis Parker (August 7, 1901 – April 19, 1982) was an American college football and college basketball player and coach. He served as the head football coach at Centenary College of Louisiana in Shreveport, Louisiana from 1934 to 1939, compiling a record of 37–27–6. He was also the head basketball coach at Centenary from 1927 to 1939, tallying a mark of 140–82.

Parker was born in 1901 in Wilmar, Arkansas and was raised in Oklahoma. He died on April 19, 1982, at Virginia Hall Nursing Home in Shreveport.

== Head coaching record ==
=== Football ===
Year	Team	Overall	Conference	Standing	Bowl/playoffs
Centenary Gentlemen (Southern Intercollegiate Athletic Association) (1934–1939)
1934	Centenary	10–2	3–0	T–4th	
1935	Centenary	6–5	3–0	4th	
1936	Centenary	6–4–2	2–0	T–4th	
1937	Centenary	6–3–3	3–0	T–3rd	
1938	Centenary	7–4	2–0	4th	
1939	Centenary	2–9–1	1–1	T–14th	
Centenary:		37–27–6	14–1		
Total:		37–27–6			
