= 1937 Southwest Texas State Bobcats football team =

American college football season

1937 Southwest Texas State Bobcats football
- Conference: Lone Star Conference
- Record: 6–4 (2–2 LSC)
- Head coach: Joe Bailey Cheaney (3rd season)
- Home stadium: Evans Field

1937 Lone Star Conference football standings
	Conf.					Overall
Team	W		L		T	W		L		T
East Texas State $	4	–	0	–	0	8	–	2	–	0
North Texas State	2	–	1	–	1	4	–	4	–	2
Southwest Texas State	2	–	2	–	0	6	–	4	–	0
Sam Houston State	1	–	3	–	0	5	–	5	–	0
Stephen F. Austin	0	–	3	–	1	1	–	6	–	1
$ – Conference champion

The 1937 Southwest Texas State Bobcats football team was an American football team that represented Southwest Texas State Teachers College (now known as Texas State University) during the 1937 college football season as a member of the Lone Star Conference (LSC). In their third year under head coach Joe Bailey Cheaney, the team compiled an overall record of 6–4 with a mark of 2–2 in conference play.

== Schedule ==
Date	Opponent	Site	Result	Source
September 18	Texas Lutheran*	Evans Field; San Marcos, TX	W 34–0	
September 24	at Howard Payne*	Brownwood, TX	L 7–12	
October 1	St. Edward’s*	Evans Field; San Marcos, TX	W 14–13	
October 8	at Schreiner*	Kerrville, TX	W 13–12	
October 16	at Southwestern (TX)*	Snyder Field; Georgetown, TX	L 0–6	
October 22	Randolph Field*	Evans Field; San Marcos, TX	W 12–6	
October 29	Stephen F. Austin	Evans Field; San Marcos, TX	W 26–6	
November 5	North Texas State Teachers	Evans Field; San Marcos, TX	L 3–10	
November 13	at East Texas State	Commerce, TX	L 13–39	
November 20	Sam Houston State^{†}	Evans Field; San Marcos, TX (rivalry)	W 14–6	
*Non-conference game; ^{†}Homecoming
