= 1937 Southern Illinois Maroons football team =

American college football season

1937 Southern Illinois Maroons football
- Conference: Illinois Intercollegiate Athletic Conference
- Record: 2–7 (2–4 IIAC)
- Head coach: William McAndrew (21st season)

1937 Illinois Intercollegiate Athletic Conference football standings
	Conf.					Overall
Team	W		L		T	W		L		T
Illinois College +	5	–	0	–	0	7	–	2	–	0
Bradley +	5	–	0	–	0	6	–	3	–	0
Illinois State Normal +	4	–	0	–	2	5	–	1	–	2
St. Viator	2	–	0	–	1	6	–	2	–	1
Monmouth (IL)	1	–	0	–	3	4	–	1	–	4
Augustana (IL)	4	–	1	–	1	5	–	2	–	1
Western Illinois	3	–	1	–	1	3	–	4	–	1
Knox (IL)	2	–	1	–	1	3	–	4	–	1
Illinois Wesleyan	3	–	2	–	1	5	–	3	–	1
Northern Illinois State	3	–	2	–	1	3	–	2	–	3
Lake Forest	1	–	1	–	1	3	–	1	–	2
Wheaton (IL)	3	–	3	–	0	3	–	5	–	0
Shurtleff	1	–	1	–	0	1	–	5	–	0
Elmhurst	2	–	3	–	1	3	–	3	–	2
McKendree	2	–	3	–	1	3	–	5	–	1
Southern Illinois	2	–	4	–	0	2	–	7	–	0
North Central	1	–	2	–	3	1	–	3	–	3
Eastern Illinois	1	–	4	–	1	3	–	4	–	1
Carthage	1	–	5	–	0	1	–	6	–	0
Eureka	0	–	6	–	0	0	–	6	–	0
Millikin	0	–	7	–	0	0	–	9	–	0
+ – Conference co-champions

The 1937 Southern Illinois Maroons football team was an American football team that represented Southern Illinois Normal University (now known as Southern Illinois University Carbondale) in the Illinois Intercollegiate Athletic Conference (IIAC) during the 1937 college football season. In its 21st season under head coach William McAndrew, the team compiled a 2–7 record.

== Schedule ==
Date	Opponent	Site	Result	Source
September 25	at Missouri Mines*	Rolla, MO	L 0–27	
October 1	at Cape Girardeau*	Houck Stadium; Cape Girardeau, MO	L 0–14	
October 9	at St. Viator	Bourbonnais, IL	L 0–14	
October 16	at McKendree	Lebanon, IL	W 19–10	
October 23	Western Illinois	Carbondale, IL	L 0–17	
October 30	at Illinois State Normal	McCormick Field; Normal, IL	L 6–13	
November 5	Cape Girardeau*	Carbondale, IL	L 0–13	
November 12	Eastern Illinois	Carbondale, IL	W 3–0	
November 20	Northern Illinois State	Carbondale, IL	L 0–7	
*Non-conference game
