= 1937 Centre Colonels football team =

American college football season

1937 Centre Colonels football

KIAC champion
- Conference: Kentucky Intercollegiate Athletic Conference, Southern Intercollegiate Athletic Association
- Record: 6–2–1 (2–0 KIAC, 3–0 SIAA)
- Head coach: Ed Kubale (9th season)
- Home stadium: Farris Stadium

1937 Kentucky Intercollegiate Athletic Conference football standings
| | Conf. | | | | | Overall |
| Team | W | | L | | T | W | | L | | T |
|---|---|---|---|---|---|---|---|---|---|---|
| Centre $ | 2 | – | 0 | – | 0 | 6 | – | 2 | – | 1 |
| Murray State | 1 | – | 0 | – | 1 | 8 | – | 1 | – | 1 |
| Western Kentucky State Teachers | 1 | – | 0 | – | 1 | 7 | – | 1 | – | 1 |
| Morehead State | 3 | – | 1 | – | 0 | 7 | – | 1 | – | 0 |
| Union (KY) | 2 | – | 1 | – | 0 | 4 | – | 3 | – | 0 |
| Eastern Kentucky | 2 | – | 2 | – | 1 | 5 | – | 2 | – | 1 |
| Transylvania | 2 | – | 4 | – | 0 | 3 | – | 5 | – | 0 |
| Georgetown (KY) | 1 | – | 3 | – | 0 | 3 | – | 5 | – | 0 |
| Louisville | 0 | – | 3 | – | 1 | 2 | – | 5 | – | 1 |
$ – Conference champion

1937 Southern Intercollegiate Athletic Association football standings
| | Conf. | | | | | Overall |
| Team | W | | L | | T | W | | L | | T |
|---|---|---|---|---|---|---|---|---|---|---|
| Murray State $ | 6 | – | 0 | – | 1 | 8 | – | 1 | – | 1 |
| Erskine | 5 | – | 0 | – | 0 | 6 | – | 4 | – | 0 |
| Centre | 3 | – | 0 | – | 0 | 6 | – | 2 | – | 1 |
| Western Kentucky State Teachers | 3 | – | 0 | – | 1 | 7 | – | 1 | – | 1 |
| Centenary | 1 | – | 0 | – | 2 | 6 | – | 3 | – | 3 |
| Miami (FL) | 1 | – | 0 | – | 0 | 4 | – | 4 | – | 1 |
| Morehead State | 4 | – | 1 | – | 0 | 7 | – | 1 | – | 0 |
| Louisiana Tech | 3 | – | 1 | – | 2 | 6 | – | 3 | – | 2 |
| Louisiana Normal | 3 | – | 1 | – | 1 | 4 | – | 4 | – | 1 |
| Middle Tennessee State Teachers | 2 | – | 1 | – | 1 | 6 | – | 1 | – | 1 |
| Mississippi State Teachers | 4 | – | 2 | – | 0 | 7 | – | 3 | – | 0 |
| Union (KY) | 2 | – | 1 | – | 0 | 4 | – | 3 | – | 0 |
| Eastern Kentucky | 3 | – | 2 | – | 1 | 5 | – | 2 | – | 1 |
| Rollins | 3 | – | 2 | – | 0 | 5 | – | 4 | – | 0 |
| Oglethorpe | 3 | – | 3 | – | 0 | 3 | – | 6 | – | 1 |
| SW Louisiana | 2 | – | 3 | – | 1 | 4 | – | 3 | – | 1 |
| Stetson | 2 | – | 3 | – | 0 | 5 | – | 4 | – | 0 |
| Mississippi College | 2 | – | 3 | – | 1 | 3 | – | 6 | – | 1 |
| Wofford | 2 | – | 3 | – | 0 | 2 | – | 7 | – | 0 |
| Newberry | 2 | – | 3 | – | 0 | 2 | – | 8 | – | 0 |
| Transylvania | 2 | – | 4 | – | 0 | 3 | – | 5 | – | 0 |
| Louisiana College | 2 | – | 4 | – | 0 | 3 | – | 6 | – | 0 |
| Millsaps | 1 | – | 3 | – | 2 | 3 | – | 5 | – | 2 |
| Georgetown (KY) | 1 | – | 3 | – | 0 | 3 | – | 5 | – | 0 |
| Louisville | 1 | – | 3 | – | 1 | 2 | – | 5 | – | 1 |
| Troy State | 1 | – | 3 | – | 0 | 2 | – | 7 | – | 2 |
| Tennessee Tech | 1 | – | 5 | – | 1 | 3 | – | 5 | – | 1 |
| West Tennessee State Teachers | 1 | – | 5 | – | 0 | 3 | – | 6 | – | 0 |
| Presbyterian | 0 | – | 3 | – | 0 | 0 | – | 10 | – | 0 |
| Union (TN) | 0 | – | 5 | – | 1 | 1 | – | 8 | – | 1 |
$ – Conference champion

The 1937 Centre Colonels football team represented Centre College as a member of the Kentucky Intercollegiate Athletic Conference (KIAC) and the Southern Intercollegiate Athletic Association (SIAA) during the 1937 college football season. Led by Ed Kubale in his ninth and final season, the Colonels compiled an overall record of 6–2–1 with a mark of 2–0 in KIAC play, winning the conference title. Centre had a record of 3–0 in SIAA play. The team played home games at Farris Stadium in Danville, Kentucky.

== Schedule ==
| Date | Time | Opponent | Site | Result | Attendance | Source |
|---|---|---|---|---|---|---|
| September 25 | 2:00 p.m. | at Indiana* | Memorial Stadium; Bloomington, IN | L 0–12 | 10,000 | |
| October 2 | 2:00 p.m. | Oglethorpe | Farris Stadium; Danville, KY | W 0–19 | | |
| October 8 | 8:00 p.m. | at Chattanooga* | Chamberlain Field; Chattanooga, TN | T 0–0 | 3,500 | |
| October 15 | 2:00 p.m. | at Transylvania | Thomas Field; Lexington, KY | W 38–0 | | |
| October 23 | 2:00 p.m. | Davidson*^{†} | Farris Stadium; Danville, KY | W 8–0 | 2,000 | |
| October 30 | 1:30 p.m. | at Xavier* | Corcoran Field; Cincinnati, OH | W 21–0 | 5,000 | |
| November 6 | | at Marshall* | Fairfield Stadium; Huntington, WV | L 0–36 | 8,000 | |
| November 11 | 2:15 p.m. | at Louisville | Maxwell Field; Louisville, KY | W 20–7 | | |
| November 20 | 2:00 p.m. | at Southwestern (TN)* | Crump Stadium; Memphis, TN | W 7–6 | 3,500–5,000 | |
*Non-conference game; ^{†}Homecoming; All times are in Central time
