= 1937 Mississippi College Choctaws football team =

American college football season

1937 Mississippi College Choctaws football
- Conference: Dixie Conference, Southern Intercollegiate Athletic Association
- Record: 3–6–1 (2–1–1 Dixie, 2–3–1 SIAA)
- Head coach: Stanley L. Robinson (13th season)
- Home stadium: Provine Field; Municipal Stadium

1937 Dixie Conference football standings
	Conf.					Overall
Team	W		L		T	W		L		T
Birmingham–Southern $	6	–	1	–	0	6	–	2	–	0
Howard (AL)	4	–	1	–	0	5	–	3	–	0
Southwestern (TN)	4	–	1	–	0	6	–	4	–	0
Mississippi College	2	–	1	–	1	3	–	6	–	1
Chattanooga	2	–	3	–	0	4	–	3	–	2
Loyola (LA)	1	–	2	–	0	2	–	6	–	1
Millsaps	1	–	3	–	1	3	–	5	–	2
Mercer	0	–	3	–	0	4	–	5	–	0
Spring Hill	0	–	5	–	0	1	–	10	–	0
$ – Conference champion

1937 Southern Intercollegiate Athletic Association football standings
	Conf.					Overall
Team	W		L		T	W		L		T
Murray State $	6	–	0	–	1	8	–	1	–	1
Erskine	5	–	0	–	0	6	–	4	–	0
Centre	3	–	0	–	0	6	–	2	–	1
Western Kentucky State Teachers	3	–	0	–	1	7	–	1	–	1
Centenary	1	–	0	–	2	6	–	3	–	3
Miami (FL)	1	–	0	–	0	4	–	4	–	1
Morehead State	4	–	1	–	0	7	–	1	–	0
Louisiana Tech	3	–	1	–	2	6	–	3	–	2
Louisiana Normal	3	–	1	–	1	4	–	4	–	1
Middle Tennessee State Teachers	2	–	1	–	1	6	–	1	–	1
Mississippi State Teachers	4	–	2	–	0	7	–	3	–	0
Union (KY)	2	–	1	–	0	4	–	3	–	0
Eastern Kentucky	3	–	2	–	1	5	–	2	–	1
Rollins	3	–	2	–	0	5	–	4	–	0
Oglethorpe	3	–	3	–	0	3	–	6	–	1
SW Louisiana	2	–	3	–	1	4	–	3	–	1
Stetson	2	–	3	–	0	5	–	4	–	0
Mississippi College	2	–	3	–	1	3	–	6	–	1
Wofford	2	–	3	–	0	2	–	7	–	0
Newberry	2	–	3	–	0	2	–	8	–	0
Transylvania	2	–	4	–	0	3	–	5	–	0
Louisiana College	2	–	4	–	0	3	–	6	–	0
Millsaps	1	–	3	–	2	3	–	5	–	2
Georgetown (KY)	1	–	3	–	0	3	–	5	–	0
Louisville	1	–	3	–	1	2	–	5	–	1
Troy State	1	–	3	–	0	2	–	7	–	2
Tennessee Tech	1	–	5	–	1	3	–	5	–	1
West Tennessee State Teachers	1	–	5	–	0	3	–	6	–	0
Presbyterian	0	–	3	–	0	0	–	10	–	0
Union (TN)	0	–	5	–	1	1	–	8	–	1
$ – Conference champion

The 1937 Mississippi College Choctaws football team was an American football team that represented Mississippi College as a member of the Dixie Conference and the Southern Intercollegiate Athletic Association (SIAA) in the 1937 college football season. Led by Stanley L. Robinson in his 13th season as head coach, the team compiled an overall record of 3–6–1 and with a mark of 2–1–1 in Dixie Conference play and 2–3–1 against SIAA competition.

== Schedule ==
Date	Opponent	Site	Result	Attendance	Source
September 25	Southwestern Louisiana	Provine Field; Clinton, MS	W 13–0		
October 1	at Chattanooga	Chamberlain Field; Chattanooga, TN	L 0–13	3,500	
October 9	at Tulane*	Tulane Stadium; New Orleans, LA	L 0–84	12,000	
October 16	Millsaps	Municipal Stadium; Jackson, MS (rivalry)	T 0–0	3,000	
October 23	at Murray State	College Stadium; Murray, KY	L 0–43		
November 5	at Spring Hill	Dorn Stadium; Mobile, AL	W 18–6		
November 13	at Oglethorpe*	Hermance Stadium; North Atlanta, GA	L 0–12	1,500	
November 20	vs. Millsaps	Municipal Stadium; Jackson, MS (rivalry)	W 12–0		
November 25	at Stetson	DeLand, FL	L 6–14		
November 29	at Tampa	Phillips Field; Tampa, FL	L 6–21	4,000	
*Non-conference game
