= 1937 Louisiana Tech Bulldogs football team =

American college football season

1937 Louisiana Tech Bulldogs football
- Conference: Southern Intercollegiate Athletic Association
- Record: 6–3–2 (3–1–2 SIAA)
- Head coach: Eddie McLane (4th season)
- Captain: Johnny Wyss
- Home stadium: Tech Stadium

1937 Southern Intercollegiate Athletic Association football standings
	Conf.					Overall
Team	W		L		T	W		L		T
Murray State $	6	–	0	–	1	8	–	1	–	1
Erskine	5	–	0	–	0	6	–	4	–	0
Centre	3	–	0	–	0	6	–	2	–	1
Western Kentucky State Teachers	3	–	0	–	1	7	–	1	–	1
Centenary	1	–	0	–	2	6	–	3	–	3
Miami (FL)	1	–	0	–	0	4	–	4	–	1
Morehead State	4	–	1	–	0	7	–	1	–	0
Louisiana Tech	3	–	1	–	2	6	–	3	–	2
Louisiana Normal	3	–	1	–	1	4	–	4	–	1
Middle Tennessee State Teachers	2	–	1	–	1	6	–	1	–	1
Mississippi State Teachers	4	–	2	–	0	7	–	3	–	0
Union (KY)	2	–	1	–	0	4	–	3	–	0
Eastern Kentucky	3	–	2	–	1	5	–	2	–	1
Rollins	3	–	2	–	0	5	–	4	–	0
Oglethorpe	3	–	3	–	0	3	–	6	–	1
SW Louisiana	2	–	3	–	1	4	–	3	–	1
Stetson	2	–	3	–	0	5	–	4	–	0
Mississippi College	2	–	3	–	1	3	–	6	–	1
Wofford	2	–	3	–	0	2	–	7	–	0
Newberry	2	–	3	–	0	2	–	8	–	0
Transylvania	2	–	4	–	0	3	–	5	–	0
Louisiana College	2	–	4	–	0	3	–	6	–	0
Millsaps	1	–	3	–	2	3	–	5	–	2
Georgetown (KY)	1	–	3	–	0	3	–	5	–	0
Louisville	1	–	3	–	1	2	–	5	–	1
Troy State	1	–	3	–	0	2	–	7	–	2
Tennessee Tech	1	–	5	–	1	3	–	5	–	1
West Tennessee State Teachers	1	–	5	–	0	3	–	6	–	0
Presbyterian	0	–	3	–	0	0	–	10	–	0
Union (TN)	0	–	5	–	1	1	–	8	–	1
$ – Conference champion

The 1937 Louisiana Tech Bulldogs football team was an American football team that represented the Louisiana Polytechnic Institute (now known as Louisiana Tech University) as a member of the Southern Intercollegiate Athletic Association during the 1937 college football season. In their fourth year under head coach Eddie McLane, the team compiled a 6–3–2 record.

== Schedule ==
Date	Time	Opponent	Site	Result	Attendance	Source
September 17		Oklahoma City*	Tech Stadium; Ruston, LA	W 27–6		
September 25		at Ole Miss*	Hemingway Stadium; Oxford, MS	L 0–13		
October 2		Illinois Wesleyan*	Tech Stadium; Ruston, LA	L 0–2		
October 8		Millsaps	Tech Stadium; Ruston, LA	W 7–0		
October 15		Mississippi State Teachers	Tech Stadium; Ruston, LA (rivalry)	W 7–0	3,000	
October 23	2:30 p.m.	vs. Louisiana Normal	State Fair Stadium; Shreveport, LA (rivalry)	W 14–0	7,500	
November 5		at Tampa*	Phillips Field; Tampa, FL	W 26–13	3,000	
November 12		Southwestern Louisiana	Tech Stadium; Ruston, LA (rivalry)	T 0–0		
November 20		at Louisiana College	Alumni Field; Pineville, LA	L 12–13		
November 25		South Dakota*	Tech Stadium; Ruston, LA	W 20–6	4,500	
December 4		Centenary	Tech Stadium; Ruston, LA	T 7–7	6,000	
*Non-conference game; All times are in Central time
