= 1937 Northern Illinois State Evansmen football team =

American college football season

1937 Northern Illinois State Evansmen football
- Conference: Illinois Intercollegiate Athletic Conference
- Record: 3–2–3 (3–2–1 IIAC)
- Head coach: Chick Evans (9th season)
- Captains: Louis DeRango; Joseph Rockenbach
- Home stadium: Glidden Field

1937 Illinois Intercollegiate Athletic Conference football standings
	Conf.					Overall
Team	W		L		T	W		L		T
Illinois College +	5	–	0	–	0	7	–	2	–	0
Bradley +	5	–	0	–	0	6	–	3	–	0
Illinois State Normal +	4	–	0	–	2	5	–	1	–	2
St. Viator	2	–	0	–	1	6	–	2	–	1
Monmouth (IL)	1	–	0	–	3	4	–	1	–	4
Augustana (IL)	4	–	1	–	1	5	–	2	–	1
Western Illinois	3	–	1	–	1	3	–	4	–	1
Knox (IL)	2	–	1	–	1	3	–	4	–	1
Illinois Wesleyan	3	–	2	–	1	5	–	3	–	1
Northern Illinois State	3	–	2	–	1	3	–	2	–	3
Lake Forest	1	–	1	–	1	3	–	1	–	2
Wheaton (IL)	3	–	3	–	0	3	–	5	–	0
Shurtleff	1	–	1	–	0	1	–	5	–	0
Elmhurst	2	–	3	–	1	3	–	3	–	2
McKendree	2	–	3	–	1	3	–	5	–	1
Southern Illinois	2	–	4	–	0	2	–	7	–	0
North Central	1	–	2	–	3	1	–	3	–	3
Eastern Illinois	1	–	4	–	1	3	–	4	–	1
Carthage	1	–	5	–	0	1	–	6	–	0
Eureka	0	–	6	–	0	0	–	6	–	0
Millikin	0	–	7	–	0	0	–	9	–	0
+ – Conference co-champions

The 1935 Northern Illinois State Evansmen football team represented Northern Illinois State Teachers College—now known as Northern Illinois University—as a member of the Illinois Intercollegiate Athletic Conference (IIAC) during the 1935 college football season. Led by seventh-year head coach Chick Evans, the Evansmen compiled an overall record of 3–2–3 with a mark of 3–2–1 in conference play, tying for ninth place in the IIAC. The team played home games at the 5,500-seat Glidden Field, located on the east end of campus, in DeKalb, Illinois.

== Schedule ==
Date	Opponent	Site	Result	Source
September 25	at Whitewater State*	Whitewater, WI	T 0–0	
October 2	at Elmhurst	Elmhurst, IL	T 7–7	
October 9	Illinois State Normal	Glidden Field; DeKalb, IL	L 2–14	
October 16	Wheaton (IL)	Glidden Field; DeKalb, IL	W 7–0	
October 30	at Eastern Illinois	Charleston, IL	W 24–6	
November 6	at Illinois Wesleyan	Bloomington, IL	L 0–7	
November 12	Stevens Point*	Glidden Field; DeKalb, IL	T 6–6	
November 20	Southern Illinois	Carbondale, IL	W 7–0	
*Non-conference game
