= 1937 college football season =

American college football season

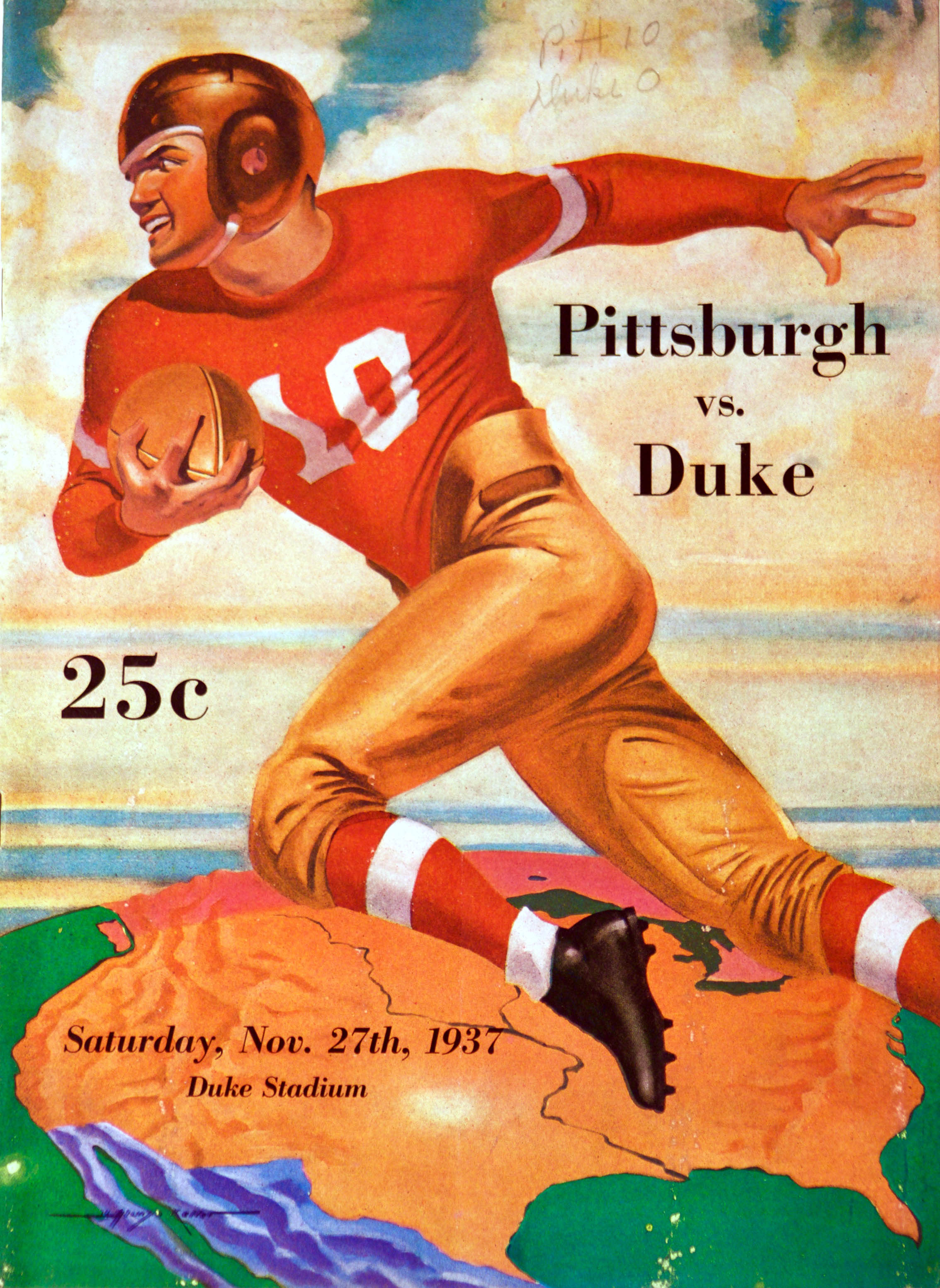
- Pittsburgh v Duke game program
- First AP No. 1 of season: California
- Number of bowls: 5
- Champion(s): Pittsburgh (Note: per AP poll, Boand System, Dickinson System, Houlgate System, Litkenhous Ratings, Poling System, Williamson System, Berryman QPRS, Billingsley Report, College Football Researchers Association, National Championship Foundation, Sagarin Ratings Elo chess method, Sagarin Ratings Predictor method); California (Note: per Dunkel System and Helms Athletic Foundation)
- Heisman: Clint Frank (halfback, Yale)

The 1937 college football season ended with the Panthers of the University of Pittsburgh being named the nation's No. 1 team (and "mythical national champion") by 30 of the 33 voters in the Associated Press writers' poll. The AP poll was in its second year, and seven votes were taken during the final weeks of the 1937 season, starting with October 18. Each writer listed his choice for the top ten teams, and points were tallied based on 10 for first place, 9 for second, etc., and the AP then ranked the twenty teams with the highest number of points. With 33 writers polled, Pitt received 30 first place votes and 3 second-place, for a total of 327 points. Most other major rankings (both contemporary and retroactive) also have found Pittsburgh to have been the champion, though two (the contemporary Dunkel System and retroactive Helms Athletic Foundation rankings) have found California the champion.

1937 marks the first season in which the NCAA began keeping official game statistics.

== Conference and program changes ==
School	1936 Conference	1937 Conference
Akron Zippers	Ohio Athletic	Independent
Saint Louis Billikens	Independent	Missouri Valley

== September ==
September 25 The defending champion Minnesota Gophers opened their season with a 69–7 win over visiting North Dakota State. LSU beat Florida, 19–0. Alabama beat Samford 41–0. California won 30–7 over St. Mary's. In Seattle, Washington beat Iowa, 14–0. The day before, Pittsburgh had opened with a 59–0 win over Ohio Wesleyan.

== October ==
October 2 Minnesota lost at Nebraska, 14–9. LSU defeated Texas 9–0. Pittsburgh won at West Virginia, 20–0. In Birmingham, Alabama beat Sewanee, 65–0. In Los Angeles, Washington defeated USC, 7–0. California beat Oregon State, 24–6. Yale beat Maine, 26–0.

October 9 In Houston, LSU defeated Rice, 13–0. Pittsburgh beat its cross-town rival, Duquesne, 6–0. Alabama beat South Carolina, 20–0. All three teams had held their opposition scoreless. California defeated Washington State 27–0. Washington lost to Oregon State, 6–3. Yale beat Penn, 27–7. Minnesota recovered from its Nebraska loss to beat Indiana 6–0.

October 16 LSU registered its fourth shutout in four starts, a 13–0 win over Ole Miss. Pittsburgh and Fordham played to a 0–0 tie in New York. Alabama yielded its first points, but won at Tennessee, 14–7. California beat the California Aggies (later UC-Davis) 14–0 and Pacific, 20–0, in a doubleheader. Yale defeated Army, 15–7. Minnesota won at Michigan, 39–6. In the first poll taken, California was No. 1, followed by Alabama, Pittsburgh, Minnesota, and Yale. LSU, despite a 54–0 scoring edge over its opposition, was sixth.

October 23 No. 1 California beat No. 11 USC 20–6. In Washington, No. 2 Alabama defeated GWU, 19–0. No. 3 Pittsburgh won at No. 16 Wisconsin 26–6. No. 4 Minnesota was idle. No. 5 Yale beat No. 19 Cornell, 9–0. The next top five was No. 1 California, No. 2 Pittsburgh, No. 3 Alabama, No. 4 Minnesota, and No. 5 Yale

October 30 In Los Angeles, No. 1 California defeated UCLA 27–14, while in Pittsburgh, the No. 2 Pitt Panthers beat Carnegie Tech, 25–14. No. 3 Alabama beat Kentucky, 41–0. No. 4 Minnesota lost to Notre Dame, 7–6, and No. 5 Yale and No. 9 Dartmouth played to a 9–9 tie. No. 6 Baylor, which reached 6–0–0 with a 6–0 win over TCU, and No. 10 Fordham, which won at No. 15 North Carolina, 14–0, moved up to fourth and fifth place in the next Top Five, behind California, Alabama, and Pittsburgh.

== November ==
November 6 No. 1 California and Washington played to a 0–0 tie. In New Orleans, No. 2 Alabama beat No. 19 Tulane, 9–6. No. 3 Pittsburgh won at No. 12 Notre Dame, 21–6 to take the top spot in the next poll. No. 4 Baylor lost to unranked Texas, 9–6. No. 5 Fordham beat Purdue, 21–3. No. 9 Dartmouth, which beat Princeton 33–9, reached the next Top Five: No. 1 Pittsburgh, No. 2 California, No. 3 Alabama, No. 4 Fordham, and No. 5 Dartmouth.

November 13 No. 1 Pittsburgh defeated visiting No. 11 Nebraska, 13–7. In Portland, No. 2 California beat Oregon, 26–0. In Birmingham, No. 3 Alabama beat Georgia Tech, 7–0. No. 4 Fordham was idle. No. 5 Dartmouth and Cornell played to a 6–6 tie. No. 6 Yale returned to the Top Five with a 26–0 win over Princeton, ranking fifth behind Pittsburgh, California, Alabama, and Fordham.

November 20 No. 1 Pittsburgh beat Penn State, 28–7. No. 2 California won at No. 13 Stanford, 13–0, to finish at 9–0–1. No. 3 Alabama was idle. No. 4 Fordham beat St. Mary's, 6–0. No. 5 Yale lost its final game of the season, 13–6, at Harvard. No. 7 Minnesota closed its season with a 13–6 win over Wisconsin and moved up to fifth place behind Pittsburgh, California, Fordham, and Alabama.

On Thanksgiving Day, No. 4 Alabama beat No. 12 Vanderbilt 9–7 in Nashville. Then, on November 27 No. 1 Pittsburgh closed its season unbeaten (8–0–1) with a 10–0 win at No. 18 Duke. No. 3 Fordham closed its season unbeaten (7–0–1) with a 20–7 win over NYU at Yankee Stadium. No. 2 California and No. 5 Minnesota had completed their seasons, and the top five remained unchanged from the previous week.

== Conference standings ==
=== Major conference standings ===
1937 Big Six Conference football standings
	Conf.					Overall
Team	W		L		T	W		L		T
No. 11 Nebraska $	3	–	0	–	2	6	–	1	–	2
Oklahoma	3	–	1	–	1	5	–	2	–	2
Kansas	2	–	1	–	2	3	–	4	–	2
Missouri	2	–	2	–	1	3	–	6	–	1
Iowa State	1	–	4	–	0	3	–	6	–	0
Kansas State	1	–	4	–	0	4	–	5	–	0
$ – Conference champion; Rankings from AP Poll

1937 Big Ten Conference football standings
	Conf.					Overall
Team	W		L		T	W		L		T
No. 5 Minnesota $	5	–	0	–	0	6	–	2	–	0
No. 13 Ohio State	5	–	1	–	0	6	–	2	–	0
Indiana	3	–	2	–	0	5	–	3	–	0
Michigan	3	–	3	–	0	4	–	4	–	0
Northwestern	3	–	3	–	0	4	–	4	–	0
Purdue	2	–	2	–	1	4	–	3	–	1
Wisconsin	2	–	2	–	1	4	–	3	–	1
Illinois	2	–	3	–	0	3	–	3	–	2
Chicago	0	–	4	–	0	1	–	6	–	0
Iowa	0	–	5	–	0	1	–	7	–	0
$ – Conference champion; Rankings from AP Poll

1937 Border Conference football standings
	Conf.					Overall
Team	W		L		T	W		L		T
Texas Tech $	3	–	0	–	0	8	–	4	–	0
New Mexico A&M	4	–	1	–	0	7	–	2	–	0
Arizona	3	–	1	–	0	8	–	2	–	0
Texas Mines	2	–	1	–	1	7	–	1	–	2
New Mexico	2	–	3	–	1	4	–	4	–	1
Arizona State–Flagstaff	1	–	4	–	0	5	–	5	–	0
Arizona State	0	–	5	–	0	0	–	8	–	1
$ – Conference champion

1937 Pacific Coast Conference football standings
	Conf.					Overall
Team	W		L		T	W		L		T
No. 2 California $	6	–	0	–	1	10	–	0	–	1
Stanford	4	–	2	–	1	4	–	3	–	2
Washington	4	–	2	–	2	7	–	2	–	2
Washington State	3	–	3	–	2	3	–	3	–	3
Idaho	2	–	2	–	0	4	–	3	–	1
Oregon State	2	–	3	–	3	3	–	3	–	3
USC	2	–	3	–	2	4	–	4	–	2
Oregon	2	–	5	–	0	4	–	6	–	0
UCLA	1	–	5	–	1	2	–	6	–	1
Montana	0	–	1	–	0	7	–	1	–	0
$ – Conference champion; Rankings from AP Poll

1937 Rocky Mountain Conference football standings
	Conf.					Overall
Team	W		L		T	W		L		T
No. 17 Colorado $	7	–	0	–	0	8	–	1	–	0
Western State (CO)	3	–	1	–	0	5	–	3	–	0
BYU	5	–	2	–	0	6	–	3	–	0
Denver	5	–	2	–	0	6	–	3	–	0
Utah	5	–	2	–	0	5	–	3	–	0
Colorado College	3	–	3	–	0	5	–	4	–	0
Utah State	2	–	4	–	1	2	–	4	–	2
Wyoming	2	–	4	–	0	3	–	5	–	0
Colorado State–Greeley	2	–	4	–	0	2	–	6	–	0
Colorado Mines	1	–	5	–	0	2	–	5	–	0
Colorado A&M	1	–	6	–	0	1	–	7	–	0
Montana State	0	–	3	–	1	3	–	4	–	1
$ – Conference champion; Rankings from AP poll

1937 Southeastern Conference football standings
	Conf.					Overall
Team		W		L			W		L
No. 4 Alabama $	6	–	0	–	0	9	–	1	–	0
No. 8 LSU	5	–	1	–	0	9	–	2	–	0
Auburn	4	–	1	–	2	6	–	2	–	3
Vanderbilt	4	–	2	–	0	7	–	2	–	0
Mississippi State	3	–	2	–	0	5	–	4	–	1
Georgia Tech	3	–	2	–	1	6	–	3	–	1
Tennessee	4	–	3	–	0	6	–	3	–	1
Florida	3	–	4	–	0	4	–	7	–	0
Tulane	2	–	3	–	1	5	–	4	–	1
Georgia	1	–	2	–	2	6	–	3	–	2
Ole Miss	0	–	4	–	0	4	–	5	–	1
Kentucky	0	–	5	–	0	4	–	6	–	0
Sewanee	0	–	6	–	0	2	–	7	–	0
$ – Conference champion

1937 Southern Conference football standings
	Conf.					Overall
Team	W		L		T	W		L		T
Maryland $	2	–	0	–	0	8	–	2	–	0
No. 19 North Carolina	4	–	0	–	1	7	–	1	–	1
Clemson	2	–	0	–	1	4	–	4	–	1
No. 20 Duke	5	–	1	–	0	7	–	2	–	1
VMI	4	–	2	–	0	5	–	5	–	0
NC State	4	–	2	–	1	5	–	3	–	1
South Carolina	2	–	2	–	1	5	–	6	–	1
Washington and Lee	2	–	3	–	0	4	–	5	–	0
The Citadel	2	–	3	–	0	7	–	4	–	0
Richmond	2	–	3	–	0	5	–	4	–	1
Furman	1	–	2	–	2	4	–	3	–	2
VPI	2	–	4	–	0	5	–	5	–	0
William & Mary	1	–	3	–	0	4	–	5	–	0
Wake Forest	1	–	4	–	0	3	–	6	–	0
Davidson	1	–	6	–	0	2	–	8	–	0
$ – Conference champion; Rankings from AP Poll

1937 Southwest Conference football standings
	Conf.					Overall
Team	W		L		T	W		L		T
No. 18 Rice $	4	–	1	–	1	6	–	3	–	2
No. 16 TCU	3	–	1	–	2	4	–	4	–	2
No. T–14 Arkansas	3	–	2	–	1	6	–	2	–	2
Baylor	3	–	3	–	0	7	–	3	–	0
Texas A&M	2	–	2	–	2	5	–	2	–	2
SMU	2	–	4	–	0	5	–	6	–	0
Texas	1	–	5	–	0	2	–	6	–	1
$ – Conference champion; Rankings from AP Poll

=== Independents ===
1937 Eastern college football independents records
	Conf.			Overall
Team	W	L	T	W		L		T
No. 1 Pittsburgh		–		9	–	0	–	1
No. 6 Villanova		–		8	–	0	–	1
No. 3 Fordham		–		7	–	0	–	1
No. 7 Dartmouth		–		7	–	0	–	2
No. T–14 Holy Cross		–		8	–	0	–	2
St. Thomas (PA)		–		6	–	1	–	1
No. 12 Yale		–		6	–	1	–	1
Army		–		7	–	2	–	0
Boston University		–		6	–	2	–	0
Cornell		–		5	–	2	–	1
Harvard		–		5	–	2	–	1
Syracuse		–		5	–	2	–	1
CCNY		–		5	–	2	–	0
No. 12 Manhattan		–		6	–	3	–	1
Penn State		–		5	–	3	–	0
Duquesne		–		6	–	4	–	0
Brown		–		5	–	4	–	0
NYU		–		5	–	4	–	0
Temple		–		3	–	2	–	4
Boston College		–		4	–	4	–	1
Bucknell		–		3	–	3	–	2
Buffalo		–		4	–	4	–	0
Princeton		–		4	–	4	–	0
Tufts		–		3	–	4	–	1
Colgate		–		3	–	5	–	0
Columbia		–		2	–	5	–	2
Hofstra		–		2	–	4	–	0
Carnegie Tech		–		2	–	5	–	1
Penn		–		2	–	5	–	1
Providence		–		2	–	6	–	0
Vermont		–		2	–	6	–	0
La Salle		–		2	–	7	–	0
Massachusetts State		–		1	–	7	–	1
Rankings from AP Poll

1937 Midwestern college football independents records
	Conf.			Overall
Team	W	L	T	W		L		T
Michigan State		–		8	–	2	–	0
Akron		–		7	–	2	–	0
Central Michigan		–		6	–	2	–	0
DePaul		–		5	–	1	–	2
Wayne		–		6	–	2	–	0
No. T–9 Notre Dame		–		6	–	2	–	1
Detroit		–		7	–	3	–	0
Michigan State Normal		–		5	–	2	–	1
Western State Teachers		–		5	–	3	–	0
Michigan Tech		–		4	–	3	–	0
Xavier		–		4	–	5	–	1
Marquette		–		3	–	6	–	0
Haskell		–		2	–	7	–	0
Rankings from AP Poll

1937 Southern college football independents records
	Conf.			Overall
Team	W	L	T	W		L		T
Delaware State		–		1	–	0	–	0
Hardin–Simmons		–		8	–	0	–	1
West Virginia		–		8	–	1	–	1
Catholic University		–		5	–	3	–	0
William & Mary Norfolk		–		5	–	3	–	0
Roanoke		–		6	–	4	–	0
Navy		–		4	–	4	–	1
Tampa		–		4	–	5	–	0
George Washington		–		3	–	4	–	1
Georgetown		–		2	–	4	–	2
Western Maryland		–		3	–	6	–	0
East Carolina		–		2	–	5	–	0
Loyola (LA)		–		2	–	6	–	1
Virginia		–		2	–	7	–	0
South Georgia Teachers		–		2	–	9	–	0
Delaware		–		1	–	7	–	0
Oklahoma City		–		1	–	9	–	0
Jacksonville State		–		0	–	5	–	0

1937 Western college football independents records
	Conf.			Overall
Team	W	L	T	W		L		T
No. T–9 Santa Clara		–		9	–	0	–	0
San Jose State		–		11	–	2	–	1
Pomona		–		6	–	2	–	1
Humboldt State		–		4	–	2	–	0
Idaho Southern Branch		–		6	–	3	–	0
Cal Poly		–		4	–	2	–	2
Portland		–		4	–	3	–	1
Saint Mary's		–		4	–	3	–	2
San Francisco		–		4	–	5	–	1
Loyola (CA)		–		4	–	7	–	0
Gonzaga		–		2	–	6	–	2
Hawaii		–		2	–	6	–	0
San Francisco State		–		1	–	6	–	1
Rankings from AP Poll

=== Minor conferences ===
Conference	Champion(s)	Record
Alamo Conference	Texas A&I	—
Central Intercollegiate Athletics Association	Morgan College	6–0
Central Intercollegiate Athletic Conference	Wichita	4–0
Eastern Pennsylvania Collegiate Conference	Drexel	3–1
Far Western Conference	Fresno State Normal	4–0
Indiana Intercollegiate Conference	Butler	3–0
Iowa Intercollegiate Athletic Conference	Saint Ambrose; Upper Iowa	5–0; 6–0
Kansas Collegiate Athletic Conference	Baker	4–1
Lone Star Conference	East Texas State Teachers	4–0
Michigan Intercollegiate Athletic Association	Kalamazoo	4–0
Michigan-Ontario Collegiate Conference	Ferris State; Lawrence Technological University	–
Midwest Collegiate Athletic Conference	Cornell College	7–0
Minnesota Intercollegiate Athletic Conference	Gustavus Adolphus	5–0
Missouri Intercollegiate Athletic Association	Southeast Missouri State Teachers	5–0
Nebraska College Athletic Conference	Hastings	2–0–1
Nebraska Intercollegiate Athletic Association	Nebraska State Teachers–Chadron	2–0
North Central Intercollegiate Athletic Conference	North Dakota	3–0
North Dakota College Athletic Conference	North Dakota Science	4–0–1
Northern Teachers Athletic Conference	St. Cloud State Teachers	4–0
Northern Teachers Athletic Conference	Duluth State Teachers	3–0
Ohio Athletic Conference	Baldwin Wallace	4–0
Oklahoma Collegiate Athletic Conference	Central State Teachers (OK)	5–0–1
Pacific Northwest Conference	Willamette	3–0
Pennsylvania State Athletic Conference	Lock Haven State Teachers	5–0–1
South Dakota Intercollegiate Conference	Augustana (SD)	4–0
Southern California Intercollegiate Athletic Conference	San Diego State	4–1
Southern Intercollegiate Athletic Conference	Florida A&M College	5–0–1
Southwestern Athletic Conference	Texas College	5–0–1
Texas Collegiate Athletic Conference	Howard Payne	7–0
Tri-Normal Conference	Eastern Washington	2–0
Wisconsin State Teachers College Conference	North: Superior State Teachers; South: Whitewater State Teachers	3–0; 4–0

=== Minor conference standings ===
1937 Alamo Conference football standings
	Conf.					Overall
Team	W		L		T	W		L		T
St. Mary's (TX) +	1	–	0	–	1	7	–	2	–	2
Texas A&I +	1	–	0	–	1	4	–	3	–	1
Sul Ross	0	–	2	–	0	2	–	4	–	0
+ – Conference co-champions

1937 Buckeye Athletic Association football standings
	Conf.					Overall
Team	W		L		T	W		L		T
Marshall $	4	–	0	–	1	9	–	0	–	1
Dayton	4	–	1	–	0	7	–	2	–	0
Ohio	3	–	1	–	1	5	–	3	–	1
Miami (OH)	2	–	3	–	0	4	–	4	–	1
Ohio Wesleyan	1	–	4	–	0	2	–	7	–	0
Cincinnati	0	–	5	–	0	0	–	10	–	0
$ – Conference champion

1937 Central Intercollegiate Conference football standings
	Conf.					Overall
Team	W		L		T	W		L		T
Wichita $	4	–	0	–	0	7	–	3	–	0
Emporia State	3	–	1	–	0	5	–	2	–	2
Fort Hays State	2	–	2	–	0	6	–	2	–	1
Pittsburg State	1	–	3	–	0	2	–	7	–	0
Southwestern (KS)	0	–	4	–	0	3	–	5	–	0
$ – Conference champion

1937 Colored Intercollegiate Athletic Association football standings
	Conf.					Overall
Team	W		L		T	W		L		T
Morgan $	6	–	0	–	0	7	–	0	–	0
Virginia State	7	–	1	–	0	8	–	1	–	0
Virginia Union	7	–	2	–	0	7	–	2	–	0
Johnson C. Smith	3	–	2	–	0	5	–	3	–	0
Lincoln (PA)	3	–	2	–	1	6	–	2	–	1
Shaw	4	–	3	–	0	4	–	3	–	0
Bluefield State	1	–	3	–	2	1	–	5	–	3
North Carolina A&T	2	–	4	–	2	2	–	4	–	3
North Carolina College	2	–	4	–	1	3	–	4	–	1
Hampton	2	–	5	–	0	3	–	6	–	0
Saint Paul (VA)	1	–	6	–	0	1	–	6	–	0
Howard	1	–	3	–	0	2	–	5	–	1
St. Augustine's	0	–	4	–	0	0	–	5	–	0
$ – Conference champion; Conference standings were based on the Dickinson System.

1937 Dixie Conference football standings
	Conf.					Overall
Team	W		L		T	W		L		T
Birmingham–Southern $	6	–	1	–	0	6	–	2	–	0
Howard (AL)	4	–	1	–	0	5	–	3	–	0
Southwestern (TN)	4	–	1	–	0	6	–	4	–	0
Mississippi College	2	–	1	–	1	3	–	6	–	1
Chattanooga	2	–	3	–	0	4	–	3	–	2
Loyola (LA)	1	–	2	–	0	2	–	6	–	1
Millsaps	1	–	3	–	1	3	–	5	–	2
Mercer	0	–	3	–	0	4	–	5	–	0
Spring Hill	0	–	5	–	0	1	–	10	–	0
$ – Conference champion

1937 Eastern Pennsylvania Collegiate Conference football standings
	Conf.					Overall
Team	W		L		T	W		L		T
Drexel $	3	–	1	–	0	6	–	2	–	0
Franklin & Marshall	2	–	2	–	0	4	–	4	–	0
Muhlenberg	2	–	2	–	0	5	–	5	–	0
Gettysburg	2	–	2	–	0	3	–	5	–	0
Ursinus	1	–	3	–	0	3	–	5	–	1
$ – Conference champion

1937 Far Western Conference football standings
	Conf.					Overall
Team	W		L		T	W		L		T
Fresno State $	4	–	0	–	0	8	–	1	–	1
Pacific (CA)	3	–	1	–	0	3	–	5	–	2
Cal Aggies	2	–	2	–	0	4	–	4	–	0
Nevada	1	–	3	–	0	2	–	6	–	0
Chico State	0	–	4	–	0	0	–	6	–	1
$ – Conference champion

1937 Illinois Intercollegiate Athletic Conference football standings
	Conf.					Overall
Team	W		L		T	W		L		T
Illinois College +	5	–	0	–	0	7	–	2	–	0
Bradley +	5	–	0	–	0	6	–	3	–	0
Illinois State Normal +	4	–	0	–	2	5	–	1	–	2
St. Viator	2	–	0	–	1	6	–	2	–	1
Monmouth (IL)	1	–	0	–	3	4	–	1	–	4
Augustana (IL)	4	–	1	–	1	5	–	2	–	1
Western Illinois	3	–	1	–	1	3	–	4	–	1
Knox (IL)	2	–	1	–	1	3	–	4	–	1
Illinois Wesleyan	3	–	2	–	1	5	–	3	–	1
Northern Illinois State	3	–	2	–	1	3	–	2	–	3
Lake Forest	1	–	1	–	1	3	–	1	–	2
Wheaton (IL)	3	–	3	–	0	3	–	5	–	0
Shurtleff	1	–	1	–	0	1	–	5	–	0
Elmhurst	2	–	3	–	1	3	–	3	–	2
McKendree	2	–	3	–	1	3	–	5	–	1
Southern Illinois	2	–	4	–	0	2	–	7	–	0
North Central	1	–	2	–	3	1	–	3	–	3
Eastern Illinois	1	–	4	–	1	3	–	4	–	1
Carthage	1	–	5	–	0	1	–	6	–	0
Eureka	0	–	6	–	0	0	–	6	–	0
Millikin	0	–	7	–	0	0	–	9	–	0
+ – Conference co-champions

1937 Indiana Intercollegiate Conference football standings
	Conf.					Overall
Team	W		L		T	W		L		T
Butler $	3	–	0	–	1	5	–	2	–	1
DePauw	7	–	1	–	0	7	–	1	–	0
Saint Joseph's (IN)	4	–	1	–	0	4	–	2	–	1
Ball State	5	–	1	–	1	5	–	2	–	1
Earlham	2	–	1	–	2	4	–	1	–	2
Hanover	4	–	2	–	0	5	–	3	–	0
Valparaiso	4	–	2	–	0	4	–	4	–	0
Wabash	3	–	2	–	2	3	–	3	–	2
Franklin (IN)	3	–	3	–	1	3	–	4	–	1
Rose Poly	2	–	4	–	0	4	–	4	–	0
Manchester	1	–	3	–	0	4	–	3	–	0
Indiana State	1	–	4	–	0	1	–	7	–	0
Central Normal	1	–	4	–	1	1	–	5	–	1
Oakland City	0	–	5	–	0	0	–	7	–	0
Evansville	0	–	7	–	0	0	–	9	–	0
$ – Conference champion

1937 Iowa Conference football standings
	Conf.					Overall
Team	W		L		T	W		L		T
Upper Iowa +	6	–	0	–	0	6	–	0	–	0
St. Ambrose +	5	–	0	–	0	8	–	0	–	0
Dubuque	3	–	1	–	1	3	–	4	–	1
Luther	2	–	1	–	3	4	–	1	–	3
Buena Vista	3	–	2	–	0	5	–	3	–	0
Parsons	3	–	2	–	1	5	–	3	–	1
Central (IA)	3	–	2	–	1	3	–	5	–	1
Columbia (IA)	2	–	3	–	1	4	–	5	–	1
Western Union	1	–	2	–	0	4	–	4	–	0
Iowa Wesleyan	2	–	4	–	1	3	–	4	–	2
Wartburg	0	–	2	–	1	1	–	4	–	2
Penn (IA)	0	–	5	–	1	1	–	5	–	1
Simpson (IA)	0	–	6	–	0	0	–	9	–	0
+ – Conference co-champions

1937 Kansas Collegiate Athletic Conference football standings
	Conf.					Overall
Team	W		L		T	W		L		T
Baker $	4	–	1	–	0	5	–	4	–	0
Kansas Wesleyan	3	–	2	–	0	5	–	3	–	1
Bethany (KS)	3	–	2	–	0	4	–	5	–	0
Ottawa	2	–	2	–	0	5	–	2	–	0
College of Emporia	1	–	3	–	0	2	–	6	–	0
McPherson	1	–	4	–	0	2	–	7	–	0
$ – Conference champion

1937 Kentucky Intercollegiate Athletic Conference football standings
	Conf.					Overall
Team	W		L		T	W		L		T
Centre $	2	–	0	–	0	6	–	2	–	1
Murray State	1	–	0	–	1	8	–	1	–	1
Western Kentucky State Teachers	1	–	0	–	1	7	–	1	–	1
Morehead State	3	–	1	–	0	7	–	1	–	0
Union (KY)	2	–	1	–	0	4	–	3	–	0
Eastern Kentucky	2	–	2	–	1	5	–	2	–	1
Transylvania	2	–	4	–	0	3	–	5	–	0
Georgetown (KY)	1	–	3	–	0	3	–	5	–	0
Louisville	0	–	3	–	1	2	–	5	–	1
$ – Conference champion

1937 Lone Star Conference football standings
	Conf.					Overall
Team	W		L		T	W		L		T
East Texas State $	4	–	0	–	0	8	–	2	–	0
North Texas State	2	–	1	–	1	4	–	4	–	2
Southwest Texas State	2	–	2	–	0	6	–	4	–	0
Sam Houston State	1	–	3	–	0	5	–	5	–	0
Stephen F. Austin	0	–	3	–	1	1	–	6	–	1
$ – Conference champion

1937 Michigan Intercollegiate Athletic Association football standings
	Conf.					Overall
Team	W		L		T	W		L		T
Kalamazoo $	4	–	0	–	0	7	–	1	–	0
Alma	2	–	2	–	0	4	–	4	–	1
Hillsdale	2	–	2	–	0	3	–	6	–	0
Albion	1	–	3	–	0	4	–	4	–	0
Hope	1	–	3	–	0	3	–	4	–	1
$ – Conference champion

1937 Michigan-Ontario Collegiate Conference football standings
	Conf.					Overall
Team	W		L		T	W		L		T
Lawrence Tech +	2	–	0	–	1	4	–	1	–	1
Ferris Institute	2	–	0	–	1	2	–	3	–	2
St. Mary's (MI)	1	–	2	–	0	2	–	5	–	0
Assumption (ON)	0	–	3	–	0	?	–	?	–	?
$ – Conference champion

1937 Middle Atlantic Athletic Association football standings
	Conf.					Overall
Team	W		L		T	W		L		T
Bordentown $	4	–	0	–	1	?	–	?	–	?
Cheyney	1	–	0	–	2	1	–	3	–	3
Storer	3	–	1	–	1	?	–	?	–	?
Princess Anne	2	–	2	–	0	?	–	?	–	?
Bowie	1	–	4	–	0	?	–	?	–	?
Downingtown	0	–	4	–	0	?	–	?	–	?
$ – Conference champion; Bordentown was declared by the conference champion based on the Dickinson System.

1937 Middle Three Conference football standings
	Conf.					Overall
Team	W		L		T	W		L		T
Lafayette $	2	–	0	–	0	8	–	0	–	0
Rutgers	1	–	1	–	0	5	–	4	–	0
Lehigh	0	–	2	–	0	1	–	8	–	0
$ – Conference champion

1937 Midwest Athletic Association football standings
	Conf.					Overall
Team	W		L		T	W		L		T
Kentucky State $	3	–	0	–	0	7	–	0	–	0
Tennessee State	2	–	1	–	1	3	–	1	–	1
Lincoln (MO)	2	–	1	–	2	2	–	2	–	2
Wilberforce	2	–	2	–	1	4	–	2	–	1
West Virginia State	2	–	3	–	0	3	–	3	–	1
Louisville Municipal	0	–	4	–	0	0	–	6	–	1
$ – Conference champion

1937 Midwest Conference football standings
	Conf.					Overall
Team	W		L		T	W		L		T
Cornell (IA) $	7	–	0	–	0	9	–	0	–	0
Monmouth (IL)	2	–	1	–	2	4	–	1	–	4
Carleton	3	–	2	–	0	5	–	3	–	0
Coe	2	–	2	–	1	4	–	3	–	2
Ripon	1	–	2	–	1	2	–	4	–	1
Lawrence	1	–	3	–	1	2	–	4	–	1
Beloit	1	–	4	–	0	2	–	6	–	0
Knox	0	–	3	–	1	3	–	4	–	1
$ – Conference champion

1937 Minnesota Intercollegiate Athletic Conference football standings
	Conf.					Overall
Team	W		L		T	W		L		T
Gustavus Adolphus $	5	–	0	–	0	6	–	0	–	0
Concordia (MN)	3	–	1	–	0	3	–	3	–	0
Saint John's (MN)	2	–	2	–	0	5	–	3	–	0
St. Thomas (MN)	1	–	1	–	2	2	–	3	–	2
Hamline	1	–	2	–	1	3	–	2	–	2
Saint Mary's (MN)	1	–	2	–	1	1	–	4	–	2
Macalester	1	–	4	–	0	1	–	5	–	1
St. Olaf	0	–	2	–	2	1	–	4	–	2
$ – Conference champion

1937 Missouri College Athletic Union football standings
	Conf.					Overall
Team	W		L		T	W		L		T
Tarkio +	2	–	0	–	1	4	–	2	–	2
William Jewell +	3	–	0	–	1	3	–	3	–	1
Culver–Stockton	1	–	2	–	0	5	–	4	–	0
Missouri Valley	1	–	3	–	0	3	–	4	–	1
Central (MO)	1	–	3	–	0	1	–	6	–	1
+ – Conference co-champions

1937 Missouri Intercollegiate Athletic Association football standings
	Conf.					Overall
Team	W		L		T	W		L		T
Cape Girardeau $	5	–	0	–	0	9	–	0	–	0
Warrensburg	4	–	1	–	0	7	–	1	–	0
Missouri–Rolla	2	–	2	–	1	3	–	4	–	1
Kirksville	1	–	2	–	2	1	–	4	–	2
Maryville (MO)	1	–	3	–	1	2	–	5	–	2
Springfield (MO)	0	–	5	–	0	0	–	8	–	1
$ – Conference champion

1937 Missouri Valley Conference football standings
	Conf.					Overall
Team	W		L		T	W		L		T
Tulsa $	3	–	0	–	0	6	–	2	–	2
Drake	4	–	1	–	0	8	–	2	–	0
Saint Louis	2	–	1	–	0	7	–	2	–	1
Oklahoma A&M	2	–	2	–	0	4	–	6	–	0
Washington University	2	–	2	–	0	4	–	6	–	0
Grinnell	1	–	3	–	0	2	–	6	–	1
Creighton	1	–	3	–	0	2	–	7	–	0
Washburn	0	–	3	–	0	0	–	10	–	0
$ – Conference champion

1937 Nebraska College Athletic Conference football standings
	Conf.					Overall
Team	W		L		T	W		L		T
Hastings $	2	–	0	–	1	6	–	2	–	1
Doane	2	–	1	–	0	6	–	1	–	1
Midland	1	–	1	–	1	5	–	1	–	2
Nebraska Wesleyan	0	–	3	–	0	2	–	5	–	1
$ – Conference champion

1937 Nebraska Intercollegiate Athletic Association football standings
	Conf.					Overall
Team	W		L		T	W		L		T
Chadron State $	2	–	0	–	0	3	–	3	–	0
Kearney State	1	–	1	–	1	5	–	3	–	1
Wayne State (NE)	1	–	1	–	1	3	–	5	–	1
Peru State	0	–	2	–	0	2	–	5	–	1
$ – Conference champion

1937 New England Conference football standings
	Conf.					Overall
Team	W		L		T	W		L		T
New Hampshire +	1	–	0	–	0	7	–	1	–	0
Connecticut State +	1	–	0	–	0	6	–	2	–	1
Maine	0	–	1	–	1	2	–	3	–	2
Rhode Island State	0	–	2	–	1	3	–	4	–	1
+ – Conference co-champions

1937 North Central Conference football standings
	Conf.					Overall
Team	W		L		T	W		L		T
North Dakota $	3	–	0	–	0	4	–	4	–	0
South Dakota	4	–	1	–	0	6	–	4	–	0
Morningside	2	–	2	–	1	4	–	2	–	2
North Dakota Agricultural	2	–	2	–	0	5	–	4	–	0
Iowa State Teachers	2	–	2	–	1	2	–	4	–	3
South Dakota State	2	–	3	–	0	4	–	5	–	0
Omaha	0	–	5	–	0	2	–	6	–	0
$ – Conference champion

1937 North Dakota Intercollegiate Conference football standings
	Conf.					Overall
Team	W		L		T	W		L		T
Wahpeton $	4	–	0	–	1	6	–	0	–	1
Minot State	4	–	1	–	1	4	–	3	–	1
Jamestown	3	–	1	–	1	4	–	3	–	1
Bottineau	3	–	2	–	0	3	–	2	–	0
Valley City State	2	–	2	–	2	2	–	2	–	3
Ellendale	1	–	2	–	2	1	–	3	–	2
Mayville State	0	–	4	–	1	0	–	4	–	1
Dickinson State	0	–	5	–	0	2	–	5	–	0
$ – Conference champion

1937 Northern Teachers College Conference football standings
	Conf.					Overall
Team	W		L		T	W		L		T
Duluth State $	3	–	0	–	0	5	–	2	–	0
St. Cloud State	3	–	1	–	0	6	–	2	–	0
Moorhead State	2	–	1	–	0	4	–	3	–	0
Bemidji State	2	–	3	–	0	3	–	4	–	0
Mankato State	1	–	2	–	0	1	–	7	–	0
Winona State	0	–	4	–	0	2	–	4	–	1
$ – Conference champion

1937 North State Conference football standings
	Conf.					Overall
Team	W		L		T	W		L		T
Appalachian State $	5	–	0	–	0	8	–	1	–	1
Elon	3	–	1	–	0	7	–	1	–	0
Catawba	3	–	2	–	0	8	–	2	–	0
Lenoir Rhyne	2	–	3	–	0	4	–	5	–	2
Western Carolina	0	–	3	–	0	1	–	6	–	2
Guilford	0	–	3	–	0	1	–	7	–	0
$ – Conference champion

1937 Northwest Conference football standings
	Conf.					Overall
Team	W		L		T	W		L		T
Willamette $	3	–	0	–	0	6	–	3	–	0
Pacific (OR)	3	–	1	–	1	4	–	3	–	1
Puget Sound	3	–	2	–	0	3	–	4	–	0
Whitman	2	–	3	–	0	3	–	5	–	0
College of Idaho	0	–	2	–	1	2	–	5	–	1
Albany (OR)	0	–	3	–	0	2	–	4	–	1
Linfield			–			3	–	4	–	0
$ – Conference champion

1937 Ohio Athletic Conference football standings
	Conf.					Overall
Team	W		L		T	W		L		T
Baldwin–Wallace $	4	–	0	–	0	6	–	2	–	0
Denison	5	–	1	–	1	6	–	1	–	1
Case	4	–	1	–	0	6	–	2	–	1
Ohio Northern	4	–	1	–	3	4	–	1	–	3
Marietta	4	–	1	–	0	4	–	4	–	0
Wooster	5	–	2	–	0	6	–	2	–	0
Muskingum	3	–	3	–	2	4	–	3	–	2
Heidelberg	4	–	4	–	1	4	–	4	–	1
Kent State	3	–	3	–	1	3	–	4	–	1
Kenyon	1	–	1	–	1	2	–	4	–	1
Capital	3	–	4	–	0	4	–	4	–	0
Mount Union	2	–	3	–	2	3	–	3	–	3
Bowling Green	2	–	3	–	1	3	–	4	–	1
John Carroll	1	–	2	–	0	3	–	5	–	0
Oberlin	1	–	3	–	1	2	–	3	–	3
Ashland	2	–	5	–	0	2	–	6	–	0
Wittenberg	2	–	5	–	0	2	–	7	–	0
Findlay	1	–	4	–	1	3	–	4	–	1
Otterbein	1	–	6	–	0	2	–	6	–	0
Toledo	0	–	0	–	0	6	–	3	–	0
$ – Conference champion

1937 Oklahoma Collegiate Conference football standings
	Conf.					Overall
Team	W		L		T	W		L		T
Central State Teachers $	5	–	0	–	1	6	–	2	–	2
Oklahoma Baptist	4	–	1	–	1	6	–	4	–	1
Northeastern State	2	–	2	–	2	3	–	3	–	3
SW Oklahoma State	3	–	3	–	0	4	–	5	–	0
NW Oklahoma State	2	–	2	–	2	2	–	5	–	2
East Central	2	–	4	–	0	2	–	6	–	1
SE Oklahoma State	0	–	6	–	0	0	–	8	–	0
$ – Conference champion

1937 Pennsylvania State Teachers Conference football standings
	Conf.					Overall
Team	W		L		T	W		L		T
Lock Haven $	4	–	0	–	1	6	–	0	–	2
Indiana (PA)	6	–	1	–	1	6	–	1	–	1
Mansfield	4	–	1	–	0	3	–	2	–	0
Shippensburg	3	–	1	–	2	5	–	1	–	2
West Chester	2	–	1	–	0	6	–	3	–	1
Clarion	2	–	1	–	0	3	–	3	–	0
Kutztown	1	–	2	–	0	4	–	2	–	1
California (PA)	1	–	2	–	1	4	–	3	–	1
Bloomsburg	2	–	4	–	0	3	–	4	–	0
Millersville	0	–	3	–	0	3	–	4	–	0
Slippery Rock	0	–	3	–	0	3	–	6	–	0
East Stroudsburg	0	–	3	–	0	2	–	6	–	0
Edinboro	0	–	3	–	1	0	–	4	–	1
$ – Conference champion

1937 Smoky Mountain Conference football standings
	Conf.					Overall
Team	W		L		T	W		L		T
Carson–Newman $	6	–	0	–	1	7	–	1	–	1
Appalachian State	4	–	0	–	1	8	–	2	–	1
Maryville (TN)	4	–	1	–	0	5	–	2	–	1
East Tennessee State Teachers	4	–	4	–	0	4	–	5	–	0
King	2	–	3	–	1	4	–	6	–	1
Milligan	2	–	3	–	0	5	–	3	–	1
Cumberland (TN)	1	–	4	–	0	2	–	6	–	1
Tusculum	0	–	5	–	2	0	–	5	–	3
Western Carolina	0	–	3	–	1	1	–	6	–	2
$ – Conference champion

1937 South Dakota Intercollegiate Conference football standings
	Conf.					Overall
Team	W		L		T	W		L		T
Augustana (SD) $	4	–	0	–	0	8	–	0	–	0
South Dakota Mines	4	–	1	–	0	5	–	3	–	0
Southern Normal	4	–	1	–	0	5	–	3	–	0
Yankton	4	–	2	–	0	4	–	2	–	1
Northern Normal	3	–	2	–	0	4	–	5	–	0
Dakota Wesleyan	1	–	2	–	0	3	–	4	–	0
Sioux Falls	1	–	3	–	0	4	–	4	–	0
Spearfish	1	–	4	–	0	2	–	5	–	0
Huron	1	–	5	–	0	1	–	6	–	1
Eastern Normal	0	–	3	–	0	1	–	5	–	0
$ – Conference champion

1937 Southern California Conference football standings
	Conf.					Overall
Team	W		L		T	W		L		T
San Diego State $	4	–	1	–	0	7	–	1	–	0
Santa Barbara State	3	–	1	–	1	5	–	2	–	2
Redlands	2	–	1	–	2	3	–	3	–	2
Whittier	2	–	2	–	1	2	–	6	–	2
Occidental	1	–	2	–	2	2	–	2	–	3
La Verne	0	–	5	–	0	0	–	9	–	0
$ – Conference champion

1937 Southern Intercollegiate Athletic Association football standings
	Conf.					Overall
Team	W		L		T	W		L		T
Murray State $	6	–	0	–	1	8	–	1	–	1
Erskine	5	–	0	–	0	6	–	4	–	0
Centre	3	–	0	–	0	6	–	2	–	1
Western Kentucky State Teachers	3	–	0	–	1	7	–	1	–	1
Centenary	1	–	0	–	2	6	–	3	–	3
Miami (FL)	1	–	0	–	0	4	–	4	–	1
Morehead State	4	–	1	–	0	7	–	1	–	0
Louisiana Tech	3	–	1	–	2	6	–	3	–	2
Louisiana Normal	3	–	1	–	1	4	–	4	–	1
Middle Tennessee State Teachers	2	–	1	–	1	6	–	1	–	1
Mississippi State Teachers	4	–	2	–	0	7	–	3	–	0
Union (KY)	2	–	1	–	0	4	–	3	–	0
Eastern Kentucky	3	–	2	–	1	5	–	2	–	1
Rollins	3	–	2	–	0	5	–	4	–	0
Oglethorpe	3	–	3	–	0	3	–	6	–	1
SW Louisiana	2	–	3	–	1	4	–	3	–	1
Stetson	2	–	3	–	0	5	–	4	–	0
Mississippi College	2	–	3	–	1	3	–	6	–	1
Wofford	2	–	3	–	0	2	–	7	–	0
Newberry	2	–	3	–	0	2	–	8	–	0
Transylvania	2	–	4	–	0	3	–	5	–	0
Louisiana College	2	–	4	–	0	3	–	6	–	0
Millsaps	1	–	3	–	2	3	–	5	–	2
Georgetown (KY)	1	–	3	–	0	3	–	5	–	0
Louisville	1	–	3	–	1	2	–	5	–	1
Troy State	1	–	3	–	0	2	–	7	–	2
Tennessee Tech	1	–	5	–	1	3	–	5	–	1
West Tennessee State Teachers	1	–	5	–	0	3	–	6	–	0
Presbyterian	0	–	3	–	0	0	–	10	–	0
Union (TN)	0	–	5	–	1	1	–	8	–	1
$ – Conference champion

1937 Southern Intercollegiate Athletic Conference football standings
	Conf.					Overall
Team	W		L		T	W		L		T
Florida A&M $	5	–	0	–	1	6	–	1	–	1
LeMoyne	5	–	0	–	0	8	–	2	–	0
Morris Brown	5	–	2	–	0	6	–	3	–	0
Xavier (LA)	3	–	1	–	0	6	–	3	–	1
South Carolina State	2	–	2	–	1	5	–	3	–	2
Tuskegee	3	–	2	–	1	6	–	3	–	1
Knoxville	3	–	2	–	1	6	–	3	–	1
Morehouse	2	–	3	–	2	2	–	3	–	2
Alabama State	3	–	6	–	0	3	–	7	–	0
Lane	1	–	2	–	0	5	–	2	–	1
Talladega	0	–	3	–	1	0	–	4	–	2
Fisk	0	–	4	–	1	0	–	4	–	3
Clark (GA)	0	–	5	–	0	1	–	6	–	0
$ – Conference champion; Standings were based on Dickinson System ratings.

1937 Southwestern Athletic Conference football standings
	Conf.					Overall
Team	W		L		T	W		L		T
Texas College $	5	–	0	–	1	8	–	0	–	1
Arkansas AM&N	3	–	0	–	3	7	–	0	–	3
Prairie View	4	–	2	–	0	7	–	4	–	0
Langston	3	–	3	–	0	3	–	4	–	1
Wiley	2	–	3	–	1	5	–	5	–	1
Southern	1	–	4	–	1	4	–	4	–	1
Bishop	0	–	6	–	0	1	–	6	–	1
$ – Conference champion

1937 Texas Conference football standings
	Conf.					Overall
Team	W		L		T	W		L		T
Howard Payne $	7	–	0	–	0	8	–	1	–	1
Austin	6	–	1	–	0	8	–	2	–	0
McMurry	5	–	2	–	0	7	–	2	–	1
Texas Wesleyan	3	–	2	–	0	6	–	3	–	0
Daniel Baker	3	–	4	–	0	4	–	6	–	0
Southwestern (TX)	2	–	4	–	0	6	–	5	–	0
Trinity (TX)	2	–	4	–	0	2	–	7	–	0
St. Edward's	1	–	5	–	0	2	–	8	–	0
Abilene Christian	0	–	6	–	0	0	–	9	–	0
$ – Conference champion

1937 Tri-Normal Conference football standings
	Conf.					Overall
Team	W		L		T	W		L		T
Eastern Washington $	2	–	0	–	0	6	–	1	–	0
Western Washington	1	–	1	–	0	4	–	2	–	1
Central Washington	0	–	2	–	0	3	–	4	–	0
$ – Conference champion

1937 West Virginia Intercollegiate Athletic Conference football standings
	Conf.					Overall
Team	W		L		T	W		L		T
Potomac State +	4	–	0	–	0	4	–	0	–	0
Glenville State +	4	–	0	–	0	4	–	2	–	0
Concord	3	–	1	–	1	5	–	2	–	1
Morris Harvey	3	–	4	–	0	5	–	4	–	0
West Liberty State	2	–	3	–	1	4	–	1	–	1
Fairmont State	1	–	5	–	1	1	–	6	–	1
Salem	0	–	5	–	2	0	–	6	–	2
Marshall *	2	–	0	–	0	9	–	0	–	1
Davis & Elkins *	2	–	0	–	0	2	–	6	–	0
New River State *	2	–	1	–	0	5	–	2	–	0
Bethany (WV) *	1	–	2	–	0	2	–	6	–	0
West Virginia Wesleyan *	1	–	2	–	0	1	–	7	–	1
Shepherd *	0	–	2	–	1	2	–	4	–	1
+ – Conference co-champions; * – Did not qualify for conference standings Ties did not count in conference standings.

1937 Wisconsin State Teachers College Conference football standings
	Conf.					Overall
Team	W		L		T	W		L		T
Northern Division
Superior State x	3	–	0	–	0	6	–	2	–	0
La Crosse State	2	–	0	–	1	4	–	2	–	1
River Falls State	1	–	2	–	1	4	–	2	–	2
Eau Claire State	1	–	2	–	1	2	–	4	–	1
Stout Institute	0	–	3	–	1	0	–	6	–	1
Southern Division
Whitewater State x	4	–	0	–	0	6	–	0	–	1
Milwaukee State	3	–	1	–	0	3	–	3	–	1
Platteville State	1	–	2	–	1	3	–	4	–	1
Stevens Point State	1	–	2	–	1	2	–	3	–	2
Oshkosh State	0	–	4	–	0	0	–	7	–	0
x – Division champion/co-champions

== Awards and honors ==
=== All-Americans ===
The consensus All-America team included:

Position	Name	Height	Weight (lbs.)	Class	Hometown	Team
QB	Clint Frank	5'10"	190	Sr.	Evanston, Illinois	Yale
HB	Marshall Goldberg	5'11"	185	Jr.	Elkins, West Virginia	Pittsburgh
HB	Byron White	6'1"	185	Sr.	Wellington, Colorado	Colorado
FB	Sam Chapman	6'0"	180	Sr.	Mill Valley, California	California
E	Chuck Sweeney	6'0"	190	Sr.	Bloomington, Indiana	Notre Dame
T	Ed Franco	5'8"	196	Sr.	Jersey City, New Jersey	Fordham
G	Joe Routt	6'0"	193	Sr.	Brenham, Texas	Texas A&M
C	Alex Wojciechowicz	5'11"	192	Sr.	South River, New Jersey	Fordham
G	Leroy Monsky	5'10"	185	Sr.	Montgomery, Alabama	Alabama
T	Tony Matisi	6'0"	224	Sr.	New York, New York	Pittsburgh
E	Andy Bershak	6'0"	190	Sr.	Clairton, Pennsylvania	North Carolina

=== Individual leaders ===
- Rushing yards (total): Byron White, Colorado, 1,121 yards
- Rushing yards (per carry): Dick Cassiano, Pittsburgh, 9.0 yards/carry
- Passing yards (total): Billy Patterson, Baylor, 1,109 yards
- Receiving yards (total): Jim Benton, Arkansas, 814 yards
- Points scored: Byron White, Colorado, 122 points
- Punting: Johnny Pingel, Michigan State, 42.9 yards/punt

=== Heisman Trophy voting ===
The Heisman Trophy is given to the year's most outstanding player

Player	School	Position	Total
Clint Frank	Yale	HB/QB	524
Byron White	Colorado	HB	264
Marshall Goldberg	Pittsburgh	HB	211
Alex Wojciechowicz	Fordham	C	85

== Rankings ==
In the Associated Press poll of 33 sportswriters, taken on November 29, the Pitt Panthers received 29 first place votes and 327 points out of a possible 330 under the weighted scoring system. The writers agreed on the same four teams (Pitt, California, Fordham and Alabama) being the best four in the nation. California had 277, Fordham 253 and Alabama 246 points to finish second, third and fourth in the poll, and the Minnesota Gophers a distant fifth with 104 points. At the time, the final poll was taken at the end of season and was not affected by the outcome of the postseason bowl games.

== Bowl games ==
Bowl game	Winning team		Losing team	
Rose Bowl	No. 2 California	13	No. 4 Alabama	0
Sugar Bowl	No. 9 Santa Clara	6	No. 8 LSU	0
Orange Bowl	Auburn	6	Michigan State	0
Cotton Bowl Classic	No. 18 Rice	28	No. 17 Colorado	14
Sun Bowl	West Virginia	7	Texas Tech	6
Charity Bowl	Fresno State	27	Arkansas State Teachers	26
