= Providence Friars football, 1930–1941 =

American college football season

1930–1941 Providence Friars football
- Conference: Independent
- Head coach: Archie Golembeski (1925–1933); Joe McGee (1934–1937); Hugh Devore (1938–1941)

The Providence Friars football program, 1930–1941 represented the Providence College of Providence, Rhode Island, in college football as an independent from 1930 through the program's termination after the 1941 season. The program was led three head coaches: Archie Golembeski (1925–1933), Joe McGee (1934–1937), and Hugh Devore (1938–1941).

Highlights of the decade included:

- The 1931 team compiled a 7–3 record and outscored opponents by a total of 141 to 95.
- The 1932 team compiled a 4–2–2 record and outscored opponents by a total of 110 to 44.
- The 1935 team compiled a 6–2 record, shut out four of eight opponents, and outscored all opponents by a total of 98 to 44.
- In January 1942, the university dropped its football program for the duration of the emergency resulting from the United States' entry into World War II, and would not resume it after the war.

== 1930 ==
1930 Providence Friars football
- Conference: Independent
- Record: 3–4–1
- Head coach: Archie Golembeski (6th season)
- Home stadium: Cycledrome

1930 Eastern college football independents records
	Conf.			Overall
Team	W	L	T	W		L		T
Colgate		–		9	–	1	–	0
Fordham		–		8	–	1	–	0
No. 9 Army		–		9	–	1	–	1
No. 8 Dartmouth		–		7	–	1	–	1
St. John's		–		7	–	1	–	0
NYU		–		7	–	3	–	0
Cornell		–		6	–	2	–	0
Pittsburgh		–		6	–	2	–	1
Washington & Jefferson		–		6	–	2	–	1
Tufts		–		5	–	2	–	0
Temple		–		7	–	3	–	0
Bucknell		–		6	–	3	–	0
Carnegie Tech		–		6	–	3	–	0
Duquesne		–		6	–	3	–	0
Syracuse		–		5	–	2	–	2
Yale		–		5	–	2	–	2
CCNY		–		5	–	2	–	1
Brown		–		6	–	3	–	1
Drexel		–		6	–	3	–	1
Franklin & Marshall		–		5	–	3	–	1
Manhattan		–		4	–	3	–	1
Columbia		–		5	–	4	–	0
Penn		–		5	–	4	–	0
Boston College		–		5	–	5	–	0
Villanova		–		5	–	5	–	0
Penn State		–		3	–	4	–	2
Harvard		–		3	–	4	–	1
Providence		–		3	–	4	–	1
Princeton		–		1	–	5	–	1
Boston University		–		1	–	7	–	1
Vermont		–		1	–	7	–	1
Massachusetts		–		1	–	8	–	0
Rankings from Dickinson System

The 1930 Providence Friars football team represented Providence College as an independent during the 1930 college football season. In their sixth year under head coach Archie Golembeski, the team compiled a 3–4–1 record.

=== Schedule ===
Date	Opponent	Site	Result	Source
September 27	at Rutgers	Neilson Field; New Brunswick, NJ	W 12–6	
October 4	at Holy Cross	Fitton Field; Worcester, MA	L 0–27	
October 11	Coast Guard	Cycledrome; Providence, RI	L 12–14	
October 18	Clarkson	Cycledrome; Providence, RI	W 19–0	
October 25	at Canisius	Buffalo, NY	T 0–0	
November 1	Lowell Textile	Cycledrome; Providence, RI	W 20–0	
November 15	at St. John's (NY)	Dexter Park; Queens, NY	L 6–13	
November 27	at Duquesne	Forbes Field; Pittsburgh, PA	L 6–15	

== 1931 ==
1931 Providence Friars football
- Conference: Independent
- Record: 7–3
- Head coach: Archie Golembeski (7th season)

1931 Eastern college football independents records
	Conf.			Overall
Team	W	L	T	W		L		T
Bucknell		–		6	–	0	–	3
Colgate		–		8	–	1	–	0
No. 9 Pittsburgh		–		8	–	1	–	0
Cornell		–		7	–	1	–	0
Drexel		–		7	–	1	–	0
No. 7 Harvard		–		7	–	1	–	0
Temple		–		8	–	1	–	1
Columbia		–		7	–	1	–	1
Massachusetts State		–		7	–	1	–	1
Syracuse		–		7	–	1	–	1
Fordham		–		6	–	1	–	2
No. 8 Yale		–		5	–	1	–	2
Army		–		8	–	2	–	1
Franklin & Marshall		–		6	–	2	–	0
Manhattan		–		4	–	2	–	1
Brown		–		7	–	3	–	0
Providence		–		7	–	3	–	0
Penn		–		6	–	3	–	0
NYU		–		6	–	3	–	1
Boston College		–		6	–	4	–	0
Washington & Jefferson		–		6	–	4	–	0
Tufts		–		3	–	2	–	2
Villanova		–		4	–	3	–	2
La Salle		–		4	–	4	–	0
Duquesne		–		3	–	5	–	3
Carnegie Tech		–		3	–	5	–	1
St. John's		–		3	–	5	–	1
CCNY		–		2	–	5	–	1
Boston University		–		2	–	7	–	0
Penn State		–		2	–	8	–	0
Princeton		–		1	–	7	–	0
Vermont		–		1	–	8	–	0
Rankings from Dickinson System

The 1931 Providence Friars football team represented Providence College during the 1931 college football season. Led by seventh-year head coach Archie Golembeski, the team compiled a 7–3 record and outscored opponents by a total of 141 to 95.

=== Schedule ===
Date	Opponent	Site	Result	Attendance	Source
September 26	at Rutgers	Neilson Field; New Brunswick, NJ	L 0–19	9,000	
October 3	at Holy Cross	Fitton Field; Worcester, MA	L 6–26		
October 10	Vermont	Rhode Island Cycledrome; Providence, RI	W 27–13		
October 17	at Clarkson	Potsdam, NY	W 6–0		
October 24	Norwich	Providence, RI	W 24–0		
October 31	at Lowell Textile	Lowell, MA	W 19–6		
November 7	at Niagara	Niagara, NY	W 13–6		
November 14	St. John's	Providence, RI	W 33–12		
November 21	at Catholic University	Brookland Stadium; Washington, DC	L 7–13		
November 28	Rhode Island State	Providence, RI	W 6–0		

== 1932 ==
1932 Providence Friars football
- Conference: Independent
- Record: 4–2–2
- Head coach: Archie Golembeski (8th season)

1932 Eastern college football independents records
	Conf.			Overall
Team	W	L	T	W		L		T
No. 5 Colgate		–		9	–	0	–	0
Brown		–		7	–	1	–	0
Columbia		–		7	–	1	–	1
Pittsburgh		–		8	–	1	–	2
No. 8 Army		–		8	–	2	–	0
Drexel		–		5	–	1	–	1
Massachusetts State		–		7	–	2	–	0
Villanova		–		7	–	2	–	0
Duquesne		–		7	–	2	–	1
Fordham		–		6	–	2	–	0
Penn		–		6	–	2	–	0
Temple		–		5	–	1	–	2
Tufts		–		5	–	1	–	2
Cornell		–		5	–	2	–	1
Franklin & Marshall		–		4	–	2	–	1
Boston College		–		4	–	2	–	2
La Salle		–		4	–	2	–	2
Harvard		–		5	–	3	–	0
NYU		–		5	–	3	–	0
Washington & Jefferson		–		5	–	3	–	1
Manhattan		–		6	–	3	–	2
Carnegie Tech		–		4	–	3	–	2
Bucknell		–		4	–	4	–	1
Syracuse		–		4	–	4	–	1
Princeton		–		2	–	2	–	3
Yale		–		2	–	2	–	3
Boston University		–		2	–	3	–	2
Vermont		–		2	–	4	–	1
CCNY		–		2	–	5	–	0
Penn State		–		2	–	5	–	0
Rankings from Dickinson System

The 1932 Providence Friars football team represented Providence College during the 1932 college football season. Led by eighth-year head coach Archie Golembeski, the team compiled a 4–2–2 record and outscored opponents by a total of 110 to 44.

=== Schedule ===
Date	Time	Opponent	Site	Result	Attendance	Source
September 24		at Rutgers	Neilson Field; New Brunswick, NJ	T 6–6	6,500	
October 1	2:30 p.m.	at Holy Cross	Fitton Field; Worcester, MA	L 6–26		
October 8		at Vermont	Centennial Field; Burlington, VT	W 13–0		
October 15		at Boston University	Boston MA	W 25–6		
October 22		at St. Lawrence	Canton, NY	W 14–0		
October 29		at Springfield	Springfield, MA	T 0–0		
November 5		CCNY	Providence, RI	W 46–0		
November 12		Catholic University	Providence, RI	L 0–6		
All times are in Eastern time

== 1933 ==
1933 Providence Friars football
- Conference: Independent
- Record: 2–4
- Head coach: Archie Golembeski (9th season)

1933 Eastern college football independents records
	Conf.			Overall
Team	W	L	T	W		L		T
No. 7 Princeton		–		9	–	0	–	0
Duquesne		–		10	–	1	–	0
No. 9 Army		–		9	–	1	–	0
Boston College		–		8	–	1	–	0
Columbia		–		8	–	1	–	0
Pittsburgh		–		8	–	1	–	0
Colgate		–		6	–	1	–	1
Bucknell		–		7	–	2	–	0
Fordham		–		6	–	2	–	0
Tufts		–		6	–	2	–	0
Villanova		–		7	–	2	–	1
Harvard		–		5	–	2	–	1
Drexel		–		5	–	3	–	0
Massachusetts State		–		5	–	3	–	0
Temple		–		5	–	3	–	0
Manhattan		–		5	–	3	–	1
Cornell		–		4	–	3	–	0
Carnegie Tech		–		4	–	3	–	2
La Salle		–		3	–	3	–	2
Syracuse		–		4	–	4	–	0
Yale		–		4	–	4	–	0
Penn State		–		3	–	3	–	1
Brown		–		3	–	5	–	0
Vermont		–		3	–	5	–	0
Franklin & Marshall		–		4	–	5	–	0
NYU		–		2	–	4	–	1
Penn		–		2	–	4	–	1
Northeastern		–		1	–	3	–	1
Boston University		–		2	–	5	–	0
Washington & Jefferson		–		2	–	7	–	1
CCNY		–		1	–	5	–	1
Rankings from Dickinson System

The 1933 Providence Friars football team represented Providence College during the 1933 college football season. Led by ninth-year head coach Archie Golembeski, the team compiled a 2–4 record and was outscored by a total of 68 to 63.

=== Schedule ===
Date	Opponent	Site	Result	Attendance	Source
October 7	at Rutgers	Neilson Field; New Brunswick, NJ	L 0–21	5,000	
October 14	at Holy Cross	Fitton Field; Worcester, MA	L 0–14		
October 21	at Springfield	Springfield, MA	L 0–7		
November 4	Niagara	Providence, RI	L 6–7		
November 11	at CCNY	Lewisohn Stadium; New York, NY	W 39–6	1,500	
November 18	at Lowell Textile	Lowell, MA	W 18–13		

== 1934 ==
1934 Providence Friars football
- Conference: Independent
- Record: 4–3
- Head coach: Joe McGee (1st season)

1934 Eastern college football independents records
	Conf.			Overall
Team	W	L	T	W		L		T
Tufts		–		8	–	0	–	0
Trinity (CT)		–		7	–	0	–	0
La Salle		–		7	–	0	–	1
Washington College		–		5	–	0	–	1
Franklin & Marshall		–		8	–	1	–	0
No. 4 Pittsburgh		–		8	–	1	–	0
No. 8 Colgate		–		7	–	1	–	0
Columbia		–		7	–	1	–	0
No. 5 Princeton		–		7	–	1	–	0
Duquesne		–		8	–	2	–	0
Holy Cross		–		8	–	2	–	0
No. 15 Temple		–		7	–	1	–	2
No. 10 Syracuse		–		6	–	2	–	0
Bucknell		–		7	–	2	–	2
No. 14 Army		–		7	–	3	–	0
Northeastern		–		6	–	1	–	1
Rochester		–		5	–	2	–	0
Dartmouth		–		6	–	3	–	0
Saint Anselm		–		6	–	3	–	0
Amherst		–		5	–	3	–	0
Fordham		–		5	–	3	–	0
Yale		–		5	–	3	–	0
Massachusetts State		–		5	–	3	–	1
CCNY		–		4	–	3	–	0
Providence		–		4	–	3	–	0
Drexel		–		4	–	3	–	1
Boston College		–		5	–	4	–	0
Bates		–		3	–	3	–	1
Middlebury		–		3	–	3	–	1
Penn		–		4	–	4	–	0
Penn State		–		4	–	4	–	0
Williams		–		4	–	4	–	0
Carnegie Tech		–		4	–	5	–	0
Washington & Jefferson		–		4	–	5	–	0
Villanova		–		3	–	4	–	2
NYU		–		3	–	4	–	1
Boston University		–		3	–	4	–	0
Colby		–		3	–	4	–	0
Springfield		–		2	–	3	–	3
Manhattan		–		3	–	5	–	1
Harvard		–		3	–	5	–	0
Vermont		–		2	–	4	–	2
Wesleyan		–		3	–	5	–	0
Brown		–		3	–	6	–	0
Geneva		–		2	–	5	–	2
Saint Joseph's		–		2	–	5	–	1
Cornell		–		2	–	5	–	0
Lafayette		–		2	–	6	–	0
Norwich		–		2	–	6	–	0
Bowdoin		–		0	–	6	–	1
Lowell Textile		–		0	–	7	–	1
Rankings from Associated Press

The 1934 Providence Friars football team represented Providence College during the 1934 college football season. Led by first-year head coach Joe McGee, the team compiled a 4–3 record and was outscored by a total of 100 to 66.

=== Schedule ===
Date	Opponent	Site	Result	Attendance	Source
October 6	at Holy Cross	Fitton Field; Worcester, MA	L 0–25		
October 13	CCNY	Cycledrome; Providence, RI	W 19–6	800	
October 20	Springfield	Cycledrome; Providence, RI	L 13–14		
October 27	at Boston College	Alumni Field; Chestnut Hill, MA	W 13–7		
November 4	at Niagara	Lewiston, NY	L 0–7		
November 12	at Lowell Textile	Lowell, MA	W 34–0		
November 24	Rhode Island State	Brown Field; Providence, RI	W 21–7		

== 1935 ==
1935 Providence Friars football
- Conference: Independent
- Record: 6–2
- Head coach: Joe McGee (2nd season)
- Captain: Omer Landry
- Home stadium: Hendricken Field

1935 Eastern college football independents records
	Conf.			Overall
Team	W	L	T	W		L		T
No. 3 Princeton		–		9	–	0	–	0
No. 14 Holy Cross		–		9	–	0	–	1
NYU		–		7	–	1	–	0
Dartmouth		–		8	–	2	–	0
Northeastern		–		5	–	0	–	3
Syracuse		–		6	–	1	–	1
No. 10 Pittsburgh		–		7	–	1	–	2
No. 11 Fordham		–		6	–	1	–	2
Villanova		–		7	–	2	–	0
Franklin & Marshall		–		7	–	2	–	1
Providence		–		6	–	2	–	0
No. 18 Army		–		6	–	2	–	1
Colgate		–		7	–	3	–	0
Temple		–		7	–	3	–	0
Boston College		–		6	–	3	–	0
Bucknell		–		6	–	3	–	0
Duquesne		–		6	–	3	–	0
Yale		–		6	–	3	–	0
CCNY		–		4	–	3	–	0
Manhattan		–		5	–	3	–	1
Massachusetts State		–		5	–	4	–	0
La Salle		–		4	–	4	–	1
Penn		–		4	–	4	–	0
Penn State		–		4	–	4	–	0
Columbia		–		4	–	4	–	1
Vermont		–		4	–	5	–	0
Boston University		–		3	–	4	–	2
Harvard		–		3	–	5	–	0
Carnegie Tech		–		2	–	5	–	1
Buffalo		–		2	–	6	–	0
Tufts		–		1	–	5	–	2
Brown		–		1	–	8	–	0
Cornell		–		0	–	6	–	1
Rankings from United Press

The 1935 Providence Friars football team represented Providence College during the 1934 college football season. The team compiled a 6–2 record, shut out four of eight opponents, and outscored all opponents by a total of 98 to 44. The team played its home games at Hendricken Field in Providence, Rhode Island.

Joe McGee was the head coach for the second year. His assistant coaches were Phil Couhig, Charles Burdge, and Oliver Roberge. Quarterback Omer Landry was the team captain. After the successful 1935 season, Providence signed McGee to a three-year contract.

=== Schedule ===
Date	Opponent	Site	Result	Attendance	Source
September 28	at Holy Cross	Fitton Field; Worcester, MA	L 0–12	3,000	
October 5	at Saint Anselm	Manchester, NH	W 7–6		
October 12	at CCNY	Lewisohn Stadium; New York, NY	W 14–0		
October 19	at Colby	Waterville, ME	W 26–0		
October 26	at Springfield	Springfield, MA	W 12–0		
November 2	at Boston College	Alumni Field; Chestnut Hill, MA	L 6–20		
November 9	Niagara	Hendricken Field; Providence, RI	W 20–6		
November 16	Rhode Island State	Hendricken Field; Providence, RI	W 13–0		

== 1936 ==
1936 Providence Friars football
- Conference: Independent
- Record: 1–7
- Head coach: Joe McGee (3rd season)
- Home stadium: Hendricken Field

1936 Eastern college football independents records
	Conf.			Overall
Team	W	L	T	W		L		T
Middlebury		–		8	–	0	–	0
Saint Anselm		–		6	–	0	–	1
No. 3 Pittsburgh		–		8	–	1	–	1
No. 10 Penn		–		7	–	1	–	0
No. 12 Yale		–		7	–	1	–	0
No. 13 Dartmouth		–		7	–	1	–	1
Franklin & Marshall		–		7	–	1	–	1
No. 14 Duquesne		–		8	–	2	–	0
Boston College		–		6	–	1	–	2
Boston University		–		5	–	1	–	2
No. 15 Fordham		–		5	–	1	–	2
Holy Cross		–		7	–	2	–	1
Villanova		–		7	–	2	–	1
Army		–		6	–	3	–	0
Colgate		–		6	–	3	–	0
Drexel		–		6	–	3	–	0
Temple		–		6	–	3	–	2
La Salle		–		6	–	3	–	1
Buffalo		–		5	–	3	–	0
Columbia		–		5	–	3	–	0
Princeton		–		4	–	2	–	2
Saint Vincent		–		5	–	3	–	0
NYU		–		5	–	3	–	1
Manhattan		–		6	–	4	–	0
Northeastern		–		5	–	4	–	0
Bucknell		–		4	–	4	–	1
CCNY		–		4	–	4	–	0
Tufts		–		3	–	3	–	1
Harvard		–		3	–	4	–	1
Cornell		–		3	–	5	–	0
Penn State		–		3	–	5	–	0
Westminster (PA)		–		2	–	4	–	1
Brown		–		3	–	7	–	0
Carnegie Tech		–		2	–	6	–	0
Massachusetts State		–		2	–	6	–	0
Providence		–		1	–	7	–	0
Syracuse		–		1	–	7	–	0
Vermont		–		1	–	8	–	0
Rankings from AP Poll

The 1936 Providence Friars football team represented Providence College as an independent during the 1936 college football season. In their third year under head coach Joe McGee, the team compiled a 1–7 record.

=== Schedule ===
Date	Opponent	Site	Result	Attendance	Source
September 26	Colby	Hendricken Field; Providence, RI	W 27–0		
October 3	at Holy Cross	Fitton Field; Worcester, MA	L 6–21	10,000	
October 10	Western Maryland	Hendricken Field; Providence, RI	L 6–13		
October 18	Saint Anselm	Hendricken Field; Providence, RI	L 2–7	4,000	
October 24	at Boston College	Alumni Field; Chestnut Hill, MA	L 0–26	10,000	
October 31	at Springfield	Pratt Field; Springfield, MA	L 0–19		
November 8	at Niagara	Niagara Falls, NY	L 6–19		
November 13	vs. Rhode Island State	Cranston Stadium; Cranston, RI	L 0–19	10,000	

== 1937 ==
1937 Providence Friars football
- Conference: Independent
- Record: 2–6
- Head coach: Joe McGee (4th season)
- Home stadium: Hendricken Field; Cranston Stadium

1937 Eastern college football independents records
	Conf.			Overall
Team	W	L	T	W		L		T
No. 1 Pittsburgh		–		9	–	0	–	1
No. 6 Villanova		–		8	–	0	–	1
No. 3 Fordham		–		7	–	0	–	1
No. 7 Dartmouth		–		7	–	0	–	2
No. T–14 Holy Cross		–		8	–	0	–	2
St. Thomas (PA)		–		6	–	1	–	1
No. 12 Yale		–		6	–	1	–	1
Army		–		7	–	2	–	0
Boston University		–		6	–	2	–	0
Cornell		–		5	–	2	–	1
Harvard		–		5	–	2	–	1
Syracuse		–		5	–	2	–	1
CCNY		–		5	–	2	–	0
No. 12 Manhattan		–		6	–	3	–	1
Penn State		–		5	–	3	–	0
Duquesne		–		6	–	4	–	0
Brown		–		5	–	4	–	0
NYU		–		5	–	4	–	0
Temple		–		3	–	2	–	4
Boston College		–		4	–	4	–	1
Bucknell		–		3	–	3	–	2
Buffalo		–		4	–	4	–	0
Princeton		–		4	–	4	–	0
Tufts		–		3	–	4	–	1
Colgate		–		3	–	5	–	0
Columbia		–		2	–	5	–	2
Hofstra		–		2	–	4	–	0
Carnegie Tech		–		2	–	5	–	1
Penn		–		2	–	5	–	1
Providence		–		2	–	6	–	0
Vermont		–		2	–	6	–	0
La Salle		–		2	–	7	–	0
Massachusetts State		–		1	–	7	–	1
Rankings from AP Poll

The 1937 Providence Friars football team represented Providence College as an independent during the 1937 college football season. In their fourth year under head coach Joe McGee, the team compiled a 2–6 record.

=== Schedule ===
Date	Opponent	Site	Result	Attendance	Source
October 2	at Holy Cross	Fitton Field; Worcester, MA	L 0–7		
October 8	Xavier	Cranston Stadium; Cranston, RI	W 7–6	8,000	
October 16	at Saint Anselm	Athletic Field; Manchester, NH	L 0–26		
October 23	Springfield	Hendricken Field; Providence, RI	W 9–6		
October 30	at CCNY	Lewisohn Stadium; New York, NY	L 6–8		
November 7	Niagara	Hendricken Field; Providence, RI	L 6–17		
November 12	vs. Rhode Island State	Cranston Stadium; Cranston, RI	L 0–13	4,000	
November 25	Western Maryland	Hoffa Field; Westminster, MD	L 0–20		

== 1938 ==
1938 Providence Friars football
- Conference: Independent
- Record: 3–5
- Head coach: Hugh Devore (1st season)
- Home stadium: Hendricken Field; LaSalle Field

1938 Eastern college football independents records
	Conf.			Overall
Team	W	L	T	W		L		T
Worcester Tech		–		6	–	0	–	0
No. 18 Villanova		–		8	–	0	–	1
No. 9 Holy Cross		–		8	–	1	–	0
Boston College		–		6	–	1	–	2
No. 15 Fordham		–		6	–	1	–	2
No. 12 Cornell		–		5	–	1	–	1
Army		–		8	–	2	–	0
No. 8 Pittsburgh		–		8	–	2	–	0
No. 6 Carnegie Tech		–		7	–	2	–	0
No. 20 Dartmouth		–		7	–	2	–	0
Vermont		–		4	–	2	–	1
Brown		–		5	–	3	–	0
Bucknell		–		5	–	3	–	0
Syracuse		–		5	–	3	–	0
CCNY		–		4	–	3	–	0
Penn		–		3	–	2	–	3
Manhattan		–		5	–	4	–	0
Harvard		–		4	–	4	–	0
La Salle		–		4	–	4	–	0
NYU		–		4	–	4	–	0
Boston University		–		3	–	4	–	1
Penn State		–		3	–	4	–	1
Princeton		–		3	–	4	–	1
Hofstra		–		2	–	3	–	1
Duquesne		–		4	–	6	–	0
Temple		–		3	–	6	–	1
Providence		–		3	–	5	–	0
Columbia		–		3	–	6	–	0
Massachusetts State		–		3	–	6	–	0
Colgate		–		2	–	5	–	0
Buffalo		–		2	–	6	–	0
Yale		–		2	–	6	–	0
Tufts		–		1	–	6	–	1
Rankings from AP Poll

The 1938 Providence Friars football team represented Providence College as an independent during the 1938 college football season. In their first year under head coach Hugh Devore, the team compiled a 3–5 record. In January 1938, Devore was appointed as head coach of the Friars.

=== Schedule ===
Date	Opponent	Site	Result	Attendance	Source
September 24	at Holy Cross	Fitton Field; Worcester, MA	L 0–28	12,000	
October 2	Saint Anselm	Hendricken Field; Providence, RI	L 0–9		
October 9	at Niagara	Niagara Falls, NY	L 7–20		
October 15	Manhattan	LaSalle Field; Providence, RI	L 7–20	3,000	
October 22	at Springfield	Pratt Field; Springfield, MA	W 7–3		
October 30	at Xavier	Xavier Stadium; Cincinnati, OH	L 7–33	12,000	
November 5	CCNY	Hendricken Field; Providence, RI	W 25–6		
November 11	vs. Rhode Island State	Cranston Stadium; Cranston, RI	W 19–7		

== 1939 ==
1939 Providence Friars football
- Conference: Independent
- Record: 3–5
- Head coach: Hugh Devore (2nd season)
- Home stadium: Hendricken Field; Cranston Stadium

1939 Eastern college football independents records
	Conf.			Overall
Team	W	L	T	W		L		T
No. 4 Cornell		–		8	–	0	–	0
No. 10 Duquesne		–		8	–	0	–	1
Swarthmore		–		6	–	0	–	1
Scranton		–		7	–	0	–	2
Princeton		–		7	–	1	–	0
La Salle		–		6	–	1	–	1
Penn State		–		5	–	1	–	2
No. 11 Boston College		–		9	–	2	–	0
No. 17 Fordham		–		6	–	2	–	0
Villanova		–		6	–	2	–	0
Boston University		–		5	–	3	–	0
Brown		–		5	–	3	–	1
Dartmouth		–		5	–	3	–	1
Hofstra		–		4	–	3	–	0
NYU		–		5	–	4	–	0
Pittsburgh		–		5	–	4	–	0
Harvard		–		4	–	4	–	0
Manhattan		–		4	–	4	–	0
Penn		–		4	–	4	–	0
Syracuse		–		3	–	3	–	2
Vermont		–		3	–	3	–	2
Tufts		–		3	–	4	–	1
Yale		–		3	–	4	–	1
Army		–		3	–	4	–	2
Bucknell		–		3	–	5	–	0
Carnegie Tech		–		3	–	5	–	0
Providence		–		3	–	5	–	0
Columbia		–		2	–	4	–	2
Massachusetts State		–		2	–	5	–	2
Colgate		–		2	–	5	–	1
Temple		–		2	–	7	–	0
CCNY		–		1	–	7	–	0
Buffalo		–		0	–	7	–	0
Rankings from AP Poll

The 1939 Providence Friars football team represented Providence College as an independent during the 1939 college football season. In their second year under head coach Hugh Devore, the team compiled a 3–5 record.

Providence was ranked at No. 203 (out of 609 teams) in the final Litkenhous Ratings for 1939.

=== Schedule ===
Date	Opponent	Site	Result	Attendance	Source
September 22	Rhode Island State	Cranston Stadium; Cranston, RI	W 6–0		
September 29	St. Bonaventure	Cranston Stadium; Cranston, RI	L 0–6		
October 6	at Long Island	Ebbets Field; Brooklyn, NY	L 0–7	10,000	
October 15	Niagara	Hendricken Field; Providence, RI	W 14–6	3,500	
October 20	American International	Cranston Stadium; Cranston, RI	W 27–0	2,000	
October 28	Springfield	Hendricken Field; Providence, RI	L 0–13		
November 4	at Holy Cross	Fitton Field; Worcester, MA	L 0–46	10,000	
November 18	at Saint Anselm	Athletic Field; Manchester, NH	L 13–0	4,000	

== 1940 ==
1940 Providence Friars football
- Conference: Independent
- Record: 3–6
- Head coach: Hugh Devore (3rd season)
- Home stadium: LaSalle Field

1940 Eastern college football independents records
	Conf.			Overall
Team	W	L	T	W		L		T
No. 5 Boston College		–		11	–	0	–	0
Duquesne		–		7	–	1	–	0
No. 14 Penn		–		6	–	1	–	1
Penn State		–		6	–	1	–	1
No. 12 Fordham		–		7	–	2	–	0
No. 15 Cornell		–		6	–	2	–	0
La Salle		–		6	–	2	–	0
Princeton		–		5	–	2	–	1
Columbia		–		5	–	2	–	2
Brown		–		6	–	3	–	1
Bucknell		–		4	–	2	–	2
Boston University		–		5	–	3	–	0
Colgate		–		5	–	3	–	0
Hofstra		–		4	–	3	–	0
Harvard		–		3	–	2	–	3
Dartmouth		–		5	–	4	–	0
Temple		–		4	–	4	–	1
Tufts		–		4	–	4	–	0
Vermont		–		4	–	4	–	0
Villanova		–		4	–	5	–	0
Pittsburgh		–		3	–	4	–	1
Syracuse		–		3	–	4	–	1
Buffalo		–		3	–	5	–	0
Carnegie Tech		–		3	–	5	–	0
Manhattan		–		3	–	6	–	0
Providence		–		3	–	6	–	0
NYU		–		2	–	7	–	0
Yale		–		1	–	7	–	0
Army		–		1	–	7	–	1
CCNY		–		1	–	5	–	1
Massachusetts State		–		1	–	8	–	0
Rankings from AP Poll

The 1940 Providence Friars football team represented Providence College as an independent during the 1940 college football season. In their third year under head coach Hugh Devore, the team compiled a 3–6 record.

Providence was ranked at No. 195 (out of 697 college football teams) in the final rankings under the Litkenhous Difference by Score system for 1940.

=== Schedule ===
Date	Opponent	Site	Result	Attendance	Source
September 28	at Holy Cross	Fitton Field; Worcester, MA	L 6–34	15,000	
October 6	at Long Island	Ebbets Field; Brooklyn, NY	L 0–6		
October 13	at Niagara	Niagara Falls, NY	L 0–14		
October 20	Canisius	LaSalle Field; Providence, RI	W 13–2		
October 23	vs. Rhode Island State	Cranston Stadium; Cranston, RI	W 25–0	7,000	
November 2	at Springfield	Pratt Field; Springfield, MA	W 20–0		
November 10	La Salle	LaSalle Field; Providence, RI	L 7–13	3,000	
November 17	Saint Anselm^{†}	LaSalle Field; Providence, RI	L 7–8	5,000	
November 23	at Catholic University	Brookland Stadium; Washington, DC	L 7–40		
^{†}Homecoming

== 1941 ==
1941 Providence Friars football
- Conference: Independent
- Record: 3–3–2
- Head coach: Hugh Devore (4th season)
- Home stadium: LaSalle Field

1941 Eastern college football independents records
	Conf.			Overall
Team	W	L	T	W		L		T
No. 8 Duquesne		–		8	–	0	–	0
Thiel		–		7	–	0	–	0
Saint Francis (PA)		–		6	–	0	–	1
No. 6 Fordham		–		8	–	1	–	0
Rochester		–		6	–	1	–	0
Trinity (CT)		–		6	–	1	–	0
Wagner		–		5	–	1	–	0
Franklin & Marshall		–		5	–	1	–	1
Penn State		–		7	–	2	–	0
Temple		–		7	–	2	–	0
Coast Guard		–		6	–	2	–	0
Norwich		–		6	–	2	–	0
Hofstra		–		5	–	2	–	0
Boston College		–		7	–	3	–	0
Syracuse		–		5	–	2	–	1
Bucknell		–		6	–	3	–	0
Drexel		–		4	–	2	–	1
Boston University		–		5	–	3	–	0
La Salle		–		5	–	3	–	0
Tufts		–		5	–	3	–	0
Army		–		5	–	3	–	1
CCNY		–		4	–	4	–	0
Villanova		–		4	–	4	–	0
Manhattan		–		4	–	4	–	1
Holy Cross		–		4	–	4	–	2
Colgate		–		3	–	3	–	2
Providence		–		3	–	3	–	2
Buffalo		–		3	–	4	–	1
Massachusetts State		–		3	–	4	–	1
Pittsburgh		–		3	–	6	–	0
Vermont		–		2	–	6	–	0
NYU		–		2	–	7	–	0
Carnegie Tech		–		1	–	7	–	0
Rankings from AP Poll

The 1941 Providence Friars football team represented Providence College as an independent during the 1941 college football season. In their fourth year under head coach Hugh Devore, the team compiled a 3–3–2 record.

Providence was ranked at No. 209 (out of 681 teams) in the final rankings under the Litkenhous Difference by Score System.

=== Schedule ===
Date	Opponent	Site	Result	Attendance	Source
October 4	at Holy Cross	Fitton Field; Worcester, MA	L 0–13	15,000	
October 12	at Canisius	Civic Stadium; Buffalo, NY	T 12–12	12,000	
October 17	at Saint Anselm	Manchester, NH	W 25–19		
October 22	Rhode Island State	LaSalle Field; Providence, RI	T 0–0	12,000	
November 1	at Springfield	Pratt Field; Springfield, MA	W 18–0		
November 9	at Niagara	Niagara Falls, NY	L 0–11		
November 16	at La Salle	McCarthy Stadium; Philadelphia, PA	W 20–7		
November 20	at Xavier	Xavier Stadium; Cincinnati, OH	L 0–33	6,500	

== Discontinuance of program ==
On January 22, 1942, Providence College president, the Very Rev. John J. Dillon, announced that the college was dropping football for the duration of World War II. He stated that the decision was influenced by heavy expenses, schedule difficulties and the lack of a suitable stadium. Providence's decision, alongside that of Gonzaga the same year, started a trend among Catholic universities during the war and immediate post-war years to terminate their football programs. The trend would encompass Manhattan (1942); Creighton (1942); Saint Louis (1949); Portland (1949); Saint Mary's (1950); (Note: Saint Mary's did make a comeback to football at "College Division" (ancestor of NCAA Division II and III) level between 1959 and 1992, and would play as an independent in NCAA division I-AA (ancestor of today's Football Championship Subdivision) between 1993 and 2003, before dropping football again after 2003.) Mount St. Mary's (1950); Niagara (1950); Loyola (1951); San Francisco (1951); (Note: San Francisco did make a comeback to football at "College Division" level between 1959 and 1982, but has not fielded a varsity football team since 1983.) St. Bonaventure (1951) and Santa Clara (1952). (Note: Santa Clara did make a comeback to football at "College Division" level between 1959 and 1992, but has not fielded a varsity football team since 1993.)
