= 1937 La Salle Explorers football team =

American college football season

1937 La Salle Explorers football
- Conference: Independent
- Record: 2–7
- Head coach: Marty Brill (5th season)
- Home stadium: McCarthy Stadium

1937 Eastern college football independents records
	Conf.			Overall
Team	W	L	T	W		L		T
No. 1 Pittsburgh		–		9	–	0	–	1
No. 6 Villanova		–		8	–	0	–	1
No. 3 Fordham		–		7	–	0	–	1
No. 7 Dartmouth		–		7	–	0	–	2
No. T–14 Holy Cross		–		8	–	0	–	2
St. Thomas (PA)		–		6	–	1	–	1
No. 12 Yale		–		6	–	1	–	1
Army		–		7	–	2	–	0
Boston University		–		6	–	2	–	0
Cornell		–		5	–	2	–	1
Harvard		–		5	–	2	–	1
Syracuse		–		5	–	2	–	1
CCNY		–		5	–	2	–	0
No. 12 Manhattan		–		6	–	3	–	1
Penn State		–		5	–	3	–	0
Duquesne		–		6	–	4	–	0
Brown		–		5	–	4	–	0
NYU		–		5	–	4	–	0
Temple		–		3	–	2	–	4
Boston College		–		4	–	4	–	1
Bucknell		–		3	–	3	–	2
Buffalo		–		4	–	4	–	0
Princeton		–		4	–	4	–	0
Tufts		–		3	–	4	–	1
Colgate		–		3	–	5	–	0
Columbia		–		2	–	5	–	2
Hofstra		–		2	–	4	–	0
Carnegie Tech		–		2	–	5	–	1
Penn		–		2	–	5	–	1
Providence		–		2	–	6	–	0
Vermont		–		2	–	6	–	0
La Salle		–		2	–	7	–	0
Massachusetts State		–		1	–	7	–	1
Rankings from AP Poll

The 1937 La Salle Explorers football team was an American football team that represented La Salle College (now known as La Salle University) as an independent during the 1937 college football season. In their fifth year under head coach Marty Brill, the Explorers compiled a 2–7 record.

== Schedule ==
Date	Opponent	Site	Result	Attendance	Source
October 1	at West Chester	Wayne Field; West Chester, PA	W 6–0	10,000	
October 10	Catholic University	McCarthy Stadium; Philadelphia, PA	L 12–27		
October 15	Canisius	McCarthy Stadium; Philadelphia, PA	L 0–7		
October 24	Mount St. Mary's	McCarthy Stadium; Philadelphia, PA	L 6–14		
October 31	Niagara	McCarthy Stadium; Philadelphia, PA	L 0–20	5,000	
November 6	at Albright	Reading, PA	L 0–13	5,000	
November 13	at Pennsylvania Military College	P.M.C. Stadium; Chester, PA	W 9–0		
November 21	Saint Joseph's	McCarthy Stadium; Philadelphia, PA	L 0–10	10,000	
November 28	at St. Thomas (PA)	Athletic Park; Scranton, PA	L 0–19	4,200	
