= 1937 Massachusetts State Aggies football team =

American college football season

1937 Massachusetts State Aggies football
- Conference: Independent
- Record: 1–7–1
- Head coach: Elbert Carraway (2nd season)
- Captain: Fred Sievers
- Home stadium: Alumni Field

1937 Eastern college football independents records
	Conf.			Overall
Team	W	L	T	W		L		T
No. 1 Pittsburgh		–		9	–	0	–	1
No. 6 Villanova		–		8	–	0	–	1
No. 3 Fordham		–		7	–	0	–	1
No. 7 Dartmouth		–		7	–	0	–	2
No. T–14 Holy Cross		–		8	–	0	–	2
St. Thomas (PA)		–		6	–	1	–	1
No. 12 Yale		–		6	–	1	–	1
Army		–		7	–	2	–	0
Boston University		–		6	–	2	–	0
Cornell		–		5	–	2	–	1
Harvard		–		5	–	2	–	1
Syracuse		–		5	–	2	–	1
CCNY		–		5	–	2	–	0
No. 12 Manhattan		–		6	–	3	–	1
Penn State		–		5	–	3	–	0
Duquesne		–		6	–	4	–	0
Brown		–		5	–	4	–	0
NYU		–		5	–	4	–	0
Temple		–		3	–	2	–	4
Boston College		–		4	–	4	–	1
Bucknell		–		3	–	3	–	2
Buffalo		–		4	–	4	–	0
Princeton		–		4	–	4	–	0
Tufts		–		3	–	4	–	1
Colgate		–		3	–	5	–	0
Columbia		–		2	–	5	–	2
Hofstra		–		2	–	4	–	0
Carnegie Tech		–		2	–	5	–	1
Penn		–		2	–	5	–	1
Providence		–		2	–	6	–	0
Vermont		–		2	–	6	–	0
La Salle		–		2	–	7	–	0
Massachusetts State		–		1	–	7	–	1
Rankings from AP Poll

The 1937 Massachusetts State Aggies football team represented Massachusetts State College in the 1937 college football season. The team was coached by Elbert Carraway and played its home games at Alumni Field in Amherst, Massachusetts. Mass State finished the season with a record of 1–7–1.

== Schedule ==
Date	Opponent	Site	Result	Attendance	Source
September 25	at American International	Pynchon Park; Springfield, MA	T 6–6		
October 2	Bowdoin	Alumni Field; Amherst, MA	L 0–12		
October 9	Connecticut State	Alumni Field; Amherst, MA (rivalry)	L 7–36		
October 16	at Rhode Island State	Meade Stadium; Kingston, RI	L 6–12	2,000	
October 23	at Worcester Tech	Alumni Field; Worcester, MA	L 0–14		
October 30	Amherst	Alumni Field; Amherst, MA	L 6–41		
November 5	at Coast Guard	Cadet Memorial Field; New London, CT	L 6–7		
November 13	RPI	Alumni Field; Amherst, MA	W 13–0		
November 20	Tufts	Alumni Field; Amherst, MA	L 0–7		
