= 1937 Boston University Terriers football team =

American college football season

1937 Boston University Terriers football
- Conference: Independent
- Record: 6–2
- Head coach: Pat Hanley (4th season)
- Home stadium: Fenway Park

1937 Eastern college football independents records
	Conf.			Overall
Team	W	L	T	W		L		T
No. 1 Pittsburgh		–		9	–	0	–	1
No. 6 Villanova		–		8	–	0	–	1
No. 3 Fordham		–		7	–	0	–	1
No. 7 Dartmouth		–		7	–	0	–	2
No. T–14 Holy Cross		–		8	–	0	–	2
St. Thomas (PA)		–		6	–	1	–	1
No. 12 Yale		–		6	–	1	–	1
Army		–		7	–	2	–	0
Boston University		–		6	–	2	–	0
Cornell		–		5	–	2	–	1
Harvard		–		5	–	2	–	1
Syracuse		–		5	–	2	–	1
CCNY		–		5	–	2	–	0
No. 12 Manhattan		–		6	–	3	–	1
Penn State		–		5	–	3	–	0
Duquesne		–		6	–	4	–	0
Brown		–		5	–	4	–	0
NYU		–		5	–	4	–	0
Temple		–		3	–	2	–	4
Boston College		–		4	–	4	–	1
Bucknell		–		3	–	3	–	2
Buffalo		–		4	–	4	–	0
Princeton		–		4	–	4	–	0
Tufts		–		3	–	4	–	1
Colgate		–		3	–	5	–	0
Columbia		–		2	–	5	–	2
Hofstra		–		2	–	4	–	0
Carnegie Tech		–		2	–	5	–	1
Penn		–		2	–	5	–	1
Providence		–		2	–	6	–	0
Vermont		–		2	–	6	–	0
La Salle		–		2	–	7	–	0
Massachusetts State		–		1	–	7	–	1
Rankings from AP Poll

The 1937 Boston University Terriers football team was an American football team that represented Boston University as an independent during the 1937 college football season. In its fourth season under head coach Pat Hanley, the team compiled a 6–2 record and outscored opponents by a total of 143 to 45.

== Schedule ==
Date	Time	Opponent	Site	Result	Attendance	Source
October 2		Lehigh	Fenway Park; Boston, MA	W 33–6	5,000	
October 9		Slippery Rock	Fenway Park; Boston, MA	W 20–0	5,000	
October 16		at Clarkson	Watertown, NY	W 35–0		
October 23		Western Reserve	Fenway Park; Boston, MA	L 0–7	5,000	
October 30		at Washington University	Francis Field; St. Louis, MO	W 14–12	5,500	
November 6		American International	Nickerson Field; Weston, MA	W 28–0		
November 11		No. 9 Villanova	Fenway Park; Boston, MA	L 0–12	15,000	
November 20	2:00 p.m.	vs. Boston College	Fenway Park; Boston, MA	W 13–6	12,000	
Rankings from AP Poll released prior to the game; All times are in Eastern time
