= Joseph McGee =

Joseph McGee could refer to:

- Joe McGee (American football) (1902–1958), football and basketball coach
- Joseph McGee (bishop) (1904–1983), Scottish Roman Catholic clergyman
- Joseph H. McGee Jr. (born 1929), American lawyer and politician
- Joe McGee (English footballer) (born 1993), midfielder for Buxton
- Joseph McGee (general), U.S. Army general
