= 1937 Penn Quakers football team =

American college football season

1937 Penn Quakers football
- Conference: Independent
- Record: 2–5–1
- Head coach: Harvey Harman (7th season)
- Captain: Bob McNamara
- Home stadium: Franklin Field

1937 Eastern college football independents records
	Conf.			Overall
Team	W	L	T	W		L		T
No. 1 Pittsburgh		–		9	–	0	–	1
No. 6 Villanova		–		8	–	0	–	1
No. 3 Fordham		–		7	–	0	–	1
No. 7 Dartmouth		–		7	–	0	–	2
No. T–14 Holy Cross		–		8	–	0	–	2
St. Thomas (PA)		–		6	–	1	–	1
No. 12 Yale		–		6	–	1	–	1
Army		–		7	–	2	–	0
Boston University		–		6	–	2	–	0
Cornell		–		5	–	2	–	1
Harvard		–		5	–	2	–	1
Syracuse		–		5	–	2	–	1
CCNY		–		5	–	2	–	0
No. 12 Manhattan		–		6	–	3	–	1
Penn State		–		5	–	3	–	0
Duquesne		–		6	–	4	–	0
Brown		–		5	–	4	–	0
NYU		–		5	–	4	–	0
Temple		–		3	–	2	–	4
Boston College		–		4	–	4	–	1
Bucknell		–		3	–	3	–	2
Buffalo		–		4	–	4	–	0
Princeton		–		4	–	4	–	0
Tufts		–		3	–	4	–	1
Colgate		–		3	–	5	–	0
Columbia		–		2	–	5	–	2
Hofstra		–		2	–	4	–	0
Carnegie Tech		–		2	–	5	–	1
Penn		–		2	–	5	–	1
Providence		–		2	–	6	–	0
Vermont		–		2	–	6	–	0
La Salle		–		2	–	7	–	0
Massachusetts State		–		1	–	7	–	1
Rankings from AP Poll

The 1937 Penn Quakers football team was an American football team that represented the University of Pennsylvania as an independent during the 1937 college football season. In its seventh and final season under head coach Harvey Harman, the team compiled a 2–5–1 record and outscored opponents by a total of 129 to 75. The team played its home games at Franklin Field in Philadelphia.

== Schedule ==
Date	Opponent	Site	Result	Attendance	Source
October 2	Maryland	Franklin Field; Philadelphia, PA	W 28–21	30,000	
October 9	at Yale	Yale Bowl; New Haven, CT	L 7–27		
October 16	at Columbia	Baker Field; New York, NY	L 6–26	28,000	
October 23	Georgetown	Franklin Field; Philadelphia, PA	T 0–0	25,000	
October 30	Navy	Franklin Field; Philadelphia, PA	W 14–7		
November 6	Penn State	Franklin Field; Philadelphia, PA	L 0–7	50,000	
November 13	Michigan	Franklin Field; Philadelphia, PA	L 0–7	18,476	
November 25	Cornell	Franklin Field; Philadelphia, PA (rivalry)	L 20–34		
