= 1937 Brown Bears football team =

American college football season

1937 Brown Bears football
- Conference: Independent
- Record: 5–4
- Head coach: Tuss McLaughry (12th season)
- Home stadium: Brown Stadium

1937 Eastern college football independents records
	Conf.			Overall
Team	W	L	T	W		L		T
No. 1 Pittsburgh		–		9	–	0	–	1
No. 6 Villanova		–		8	–	0	–	1
No. 3 Fordham		–		7	–	0	–	1
No. 7 Dartmouth		–		7	–	0	–	2
No. T–14 Holy Cross		–		8	–	0	–	2
St. Thomas (PA)		–		6	–	1	–	1
No. 12 Yale		–		6	–	1	–	1
Army		–		7	–	2	–	0
Boston University		–		6	–	2	–	0
Cornell		–		5	–	2	–	1
Harvard		–		5	–	2	–	1
Syracuse		–		5	–	2	–	1
CCNY		–		5	–	2	–	0
No. 12 Manhattan		–		6	–	3	–	1
Penn State		–		5	–	3	–	0
Duquesne		–		6	–	4	–	0
Brown		–		5	–	4	–	0
NYU		–		5	–	4	–	0
Temple		–		3	–	2	–	4
Boston College		–		4	–	4	–	1
Bucknell		–		3	–	3	–	2
Buffalo		–		4	–	4	–	0
Princeton		–		4	–	4	–	0
Tufts		–		3	–	4	–	1
Colgate		–		3	–	5	–	0
Columbia		–		2	–	5	–	2
Hofstra		–		2	–	4	–	0
Carnegie Tech		–		2	–	5	–	1
Penn		–		2	–	5	–	1
Providence		–		2	–	6	–	0
Vermont		–		2	–	6	–	0
La Salle		–		2	–	7	–	0
Massachusetts State		–		1	–	7	–	1
Rankings from AP Poll

The 1937 Brown Bears football team represented Brown University as an independent during the 1937 college football season. Led by 12th-year head coach Tuss McLaughry, the Bears compiled a record of 5–4.

== Schedule ==
Date	Opponent	Site	Result	Attendance	Source
September 25	Connecticut State	Brown Stadium; Providence, RI	W 20–0		
October 2	Rhode Island State	Brown Stadium; Providence, RI (rivalry)	W 13–6		
October 9	at Harvard	Harvard Stadium; Boston, MA	L 7–34	15,000	
October 16	Dartmouth	Brown Stadium; Providence, RI	L 0–41		
October 23	at Columbia	Baker Field; New York, NY	W 7–6	8,000	
October 30	Tufts	Brown Stadium; Providence, RI	W 19–0		
November 6	at No. 7 Yale	Yale Bowl; New Haven, CT	L 0–19		
November 13	No. 19 Holy Cross	Brown Stadium; Providence, RI	L 0–7		
November 25	Rutgers	Brown Stadium; Providence, RI	W 7–6	10,000	
Rankings from AP Poll released prior to the game
