= 1937 Carnegie Tech Tartans football team =

American college football season

1937 Carnegie Tech Tartans football
- Conference: Independent
- Record: 2–5–1
- Head coach: Bill Kern (1st season)
- Home stadium: Pitt Stadium

1937 Eastern college football independents records
	Conf.			Overall
Team	W	L	T	W		L		T
No. 1 Pittsburgh		–		9	–	0	–	1
No. 6 Villanova		–		8	–	0	–	1
No. 3 Fordham		–		7	–	0	–	1
No. 7 Dartmouth		–		7	–	0	–	2
No. T–14 Holy Cross		–		8	–	0	–	2
St. Thomas (PA)		–		6	–	1	–	1
No. 12 Yale		–		6	–	1	–	1
Army		–		7	–	2	–	0
Boston University		–		6	–	2	–	0
Cornell		–		5	–	2	–	1
Harvard		–		5	–	2	–	1
Syracuse		–		5	–	2	–	1
CCNY		–		5	–	2	–	0
No. 12 Manhattan		–		6	–	3	–	1
Penn State		–		5	–	3	–	0
Duquesne		–		6	–	4	–	0
Brown		–		5	–	4	–	0
NYU		–		5	–	4	–	0
Temple		–		3	–	2	–	4
Boston College		–		4	–	4	–	1
Bucknell		–		3	–	3	–	2
Buffalo		–		4	–	4	–	0
Princeton		–		4	–	4	–	0
Tufts		–		3	–	4	–	1
Colgate		–		3	–	5	–	0
Columbia		–		2	–	5	–	2
Hofstra		–		2	–	4	–	0
Carnegie Tech		–		2	–	5	–	1
Penn		–		2	–	5	–	1
Providence		–		2	–	6	–	0
Vermont		–		2	–	6	–	0
La Salle		–		2	–	7	–	0
Massachusetts State		–		1	–	7	–	1
Rankings from AP Poll

The 1937 Carnegie Tech Tartans football team represented the Carnegie Institute of Technology—now known as Carnegie Mellon University—as an independent during the 1937 college football season. Led by first-year head coach Bill Kern, the Tartans compiled a record of 2–5–1. Carnegie Tech played home games at Pitt Stadium in Pittsburgh.

== Schedule ==
Date	Opponent	Site	Result	Attendance	Source
October 2	NYU	Pitt Stadium; Pittsburgh, PA	L 14–18	20,000	
October 9	at Purdue	Ross–Ade Stadium; West Lafayette, IN	L 0–7	20,000	
October 16	Notre Dame	Pittsburgh, PA	W 9–7	30,418–45,000	
October 22	at Temple	Temple Stadium; Philadelphia, PA	L 0–7	25,000	
October 30	at No. 2 Pittsburgh	Pitt Stadium; Pittsburgh, PA	L 14–25	37,500	
November 6	No. 16 Duquesne	Pitt Stadium; Pittsburgh, PA	W 6–0	28,000	
November 13	Michigan State	Macklin Field; East Lansing, MI	L 6–13	20,000	
November 20	No. 14 Holy Cross	Fitton Field; Worcester, MA	T 0–0		
Rankings from AP Poll released prior to the game
