= 1937 Penn State Nittany Lions football team =

American college football season

1937 Penn State Nittany Lions football
- Conference: Independent
- Record: 5–3
- Head coach: Bob Higgins (8th season)
- Captain: Sam Donato; John Economos
- Home stadium: New Beaver Field

1937 Eastern college football independents records
	Conf.			Overall
Team	W	L	T	W		L		T
No. 1 Pittsburgh		–		9	–	0	–	1
No. 6 Villanova		–		8	–	0	–	1
No. 3 Fordham		–		7	–	0	–	1
No. 7 Dartmouth		–		7	–	0	–	2
No. T–14 Holy Cross		–		8	–	0	–	2
St. Thomas (PA)		–		6	–	1	–	1
No. 12 Yale		–		6	–	1	–	1
Army		–		7	–	2	–	0
Boston University		–		6	–	2	–	0
Cornell		–		5	–	2	–	1
Harvard		–		5	–	2	–	1
Syracuse		–		5	–	2	–	1
CCNY		–		5	–	2	–	0
No. 12 Manhattan		–		6	–	3	–	1
Penn State		–		5	–	3	–	0
Duquesne		–		6	–	4	–	0
Brown		–		5	–	4	–	0
NYU		–		5	–	4	–	0
Temple		–		3	–	2	–	4
Boston College		–		4	–	4	–	1
Bucknell		–		3	–	3	–	2
Buffalo		–		4	–	4	–	0
Princeton		–		4	–	4	–	0
Tufts		–		3	–	4	–	1
Colgate		–		3	–	5	–	0
Columbia		–		2	–	5	–	2
Hofstra		–		2	–	4	–	0
Carnegie Tech		–		2	–	5	–	1
Penn		–		2	–	5	–	1
Providence		–		2	–	6	–	0
Vermont		–		2	–	6	–	0
La Salle		–		2	–	7	–	0
Massachusetts State		–		1	–	7	–	1
Rankings from AP Poll

The 1937 Penn State Nittany Lions football team represented the Pennsylvania State College as an independent during the 1937 college football season. The team was led by eighth-year head coach Bob Higgins and played its home games in New Beaver Field in State College, Pennsylvania.

== Schedule ==
Date	Opponent	Site	Result	Attendance	Source
September 25	at Cornell	Schoellkopf Field; Ithaca, NY	L 19–26	6,000	
October 2	Gettysburg	New Beaver Field; State College, PA	W 32–6	8,919	
October 9	Bucknell^{†}	New Beaver Field; State College, PA	W 20–14	11,376	
October 16	Lehigh	New Beaver Field; State College, PA	W 14–7	7,660	
October 30	at Syracuse	Archbold Stadium; Syracuse, NY (rivalry)	L 13–19		
November 6	at Penn	Franklin Field; Philadelphia, PA	W 7–0	50,000	
November 13	Maryland	New Beaver Field; State College, PA (rivalry)	W 21–14	7,535	
November 20	at No. 1 Pittsburgh	Pitt Stadium; Pittsburgh, PA (rivalry)	L 7–28	19,936	
^{†}Homecoming; Rankings from AP Poll released prior to the game
