= 1937 Boston College Eagles football team =

American college football season

1937 Boston College Eagles football
- Conference: Independent
- Record: 4–4–1
- Head coach: Gil Dobie (2nd season)
- Offensive scheme: Single-wing
- Base defense: 6–3–2
- Captain: Tony DiNatale
- Home stadium: Alumni Field; Fenway Park

1937 Eastern college football independents records
	Conf.			Overall
Team	W	L	T	W		L		T
No. 1 Pittsburgh		–		9	–	0	–	1
No. 6 Villanova		–		8	–	0	–	1
No. 3 Fordham		–		7	–	0	–	1
No. 7 Dartmouth		–		7	–	0	–	2
No. T–14 Holy Cross		–		8	–	0	–	2
St. Thomas (PA)		–		6	–	1	–	1
No. 12 Yale		–		6	–	1	–	1
Army		–		7	–	2	–	0
Boston University		–		6	–	2	–	0
Cornell		–		5	–	2	–	1
Harvard		–		5	–	2	–	1
Syracuse		–		5	–	2	–	1
CCNY		–		5	–	2	–	0
No. 12 Manhattan		–		6	–	3	–	1
Penn State		–		5	–	3	–	0
Duquesne		–		6	–	4	–	0
Brown		–		5	–	4	–	0
NYU		–		5	–	4	–	0
Temple		–		3	–	2	–	4
Boston College		–		4	–	4	–	1
Bucknell		–		3	–	3	–	2
Buffalo		–		4	–	4	–	0
Princeton		–		4	–	4	–	0
Tufts		–		3	–	4	–	1
Colgate		–		3	–	5	–	0
Columbia		–		2	–	5	–	2
Hofstra		–		2	–	4	–	0
Carnegie Tech		–		2	–	5	–	1
Penn		–		2	–	5	–	1
Providence		–		2	–	6	–	0
Vermont		–		2	–	6	–	0
La Salle		–		2	–	7	–	0
Massachusetts State		–		1	–	7	–	1
Rankings from AP Poll

The 1937 Boston College Eagles football team represented Boston College as an independent during the 1937 college football season. Led by second-year head coach Gil Dobie, the Eagles compiled a record of 4–4–1. Boston College played home games at Alumni Field in Chestnut Hill, Massachusetts, and Fenway Park in Boston.

== Schedule ==
Date	Time	Opponent	Site	Result	Attendance	Source
September 25	3:00 p.m.	Northeastern	Alumni Field; Chestnut Hill, MA	W 35–2	11,000	
October 2	2:30 p.m.	Kansas State	Alumni Field; Chestnut Hill, MA	W 21–7	15,000	
October 12	2:30 p.m.	Temple	Fenway Park; Boston, MA	T 0–0	25,000	
October 23	2:30 p.m.	Detroit	Alumni Field; Chestnut Hill, MA	L 0–14	7,000	
October 30	2:00 p.m.	NC State	Alumni Field; Chestnut Hill, MA	L 7–12	12,000	
November 6		at Western Maryland	Westminster, MD	W 27–0	1,500	
November 13		Kentucky	Fenway Park; Boston, MA	W 13–0	3,500	
November 20	2:00 p.m.	Boston University	Fenway Park; Boston, MA (rivalry)	L 6–13	12,000	
November 27		vs. No. 17 Holy Cross	Fenway Park; Boston, MA (rivalry)	L 0–20	35,000	
Rankings from AP Poll released prior to the game; All times are in Eastern time
