= 1937 Hofstra Flying Dutchmen football team =

American college football season

1963 Hofstra Flying Dutchmen football
- Conference: Independent
- Record: 2–4
- Head coach: Jack McDonald (1st season)
- Captain: Al Sorrentino

1937 Eastern college football independents records
	Conf.			Overall
Team	W	L	T	W		L		T
No. 1 Pittsburgh		–		9	–	0	–	1
No. 6 Villanova		–		8	–	0	–	1
No. 3 Fordham		–		7	–	0	–	1
No. 7 Dartmouth		–		7	–	0	–	2
No. T–14 Holy Cross		–		8	–	0	–	2
St. Thomas (PA)		–		6	–	1	–	1
No. 12 Yale		–		6	–	1	–	1
Army		–		7	–	2	–	0
Boston University		–		6	–	2	–	0
Cornell		–		5	–	2	–	1
Harvard		–		5	–	2	–	1
Syracuse		–		5	–	2	–	1
CCNY		–		5	–	2	–	0
No. 12 Manhattan		–		6	–	3	–	1
Penn State		–		5	–	3	–	0
Duquesne		–		6	–	4	–	0
Brown		–		5	–	4	–	0
NYU		–		5	–	4	–	0
Temple		–		3	–	2	–	4
Boston College		–		4	–	4	–	1
Bucknell		–		3	–	3	–	2
Buffalo		–		4	–	4	–	0
Princeton		–		4	–	4	–	0
Tufts		–		3	–	4	–	1
Colgate		–		3	–	5	–	0
Columbia		–		2	–	5	–	2
Hofstra		–		2	–	4	–	0
Carnegie Tech		–		2	–	5	–	1
Penn		–		2	–	5	–	1
Providence		–		2	–	6	–	0
Vermont		–		2	–	6	–	0
La Salle		–		2	–	7	–	0
Massachusetts State		–		1	–	7	–	1
Rankings from AP Poll

The 1937 Hofstra Flying Dutchmen football team represented Hofstra University as an independent during the 1937 college football season. It was the program's first-ever season and they finished with a record of 2–4. Their head coach was Jack McDonald and their captain was Al Sorrentino.

== Schedule ==
Date	Opponent	Site	Result
October 9	American International	Hempstead, NY	L 6–14
October 16	Bergen CC	Hempstead, NY	W 19–0
October 23	at SUNY Farmingdale	East Farmingdale, NY	L 6–12
October 30	at Brooklyn	Brooklyn, NY	L 0–32
November 20	Gallaudet	Hempstead, NY	W 32–0
November 24	at Montclair State	Montclair, NJ	L 0–14
