= 1937 Bucknell Bison football team =

American college football season

1937 Bucknell Bison football
- Conference: Independent
- Record: 3–3–2
- Head coach: Al Humphreys (1st season)
- Home stadium: Memorial Stadium

1937 Eastern college football independents records
	Conf.			Overall
Team	W	L	T	W		L		T
No. 1 Pittsburgh		–		9	–	0	–	1
No. 6 Villanova		–		8	–	0	–	1
No. 3 Fordham		–		7	–	0	–	1
No. 7 Dartmouth		–		7	–	0	–	2
No. T–14 Holy Cross		–		8	–	0	–	2
St. Thomas (PA)		–		6	–	1	–	1
No. 12 Yale		–		6	–	1	–	1
Army		–		7	–	2	–	0
Boston University		–		6	–	2	–	0
Cornell		–		5	–	2	–	1
Harvard		–		5	–	2	–	1
Syracuse		–		5	–	2	–	1
CCNY		–		5	–	2	–	0
No. 12 Manhattan		–		6	–	3	–	1
Penn State		–		5	–	3	–	0
Duquesne		–		6	–	4	–	0
Brown		–		5	–	4	–	0
NYU		–		5	–	4	–	0
Temple		–		3	–	2	–	4
Boston College		–		4	–	4	–	1
Bucknell		–		3	–	3	–	2
Buffalo		–		4	–	4	–	0
Princeton		–		4	–	4	–	0
Tufts		–		3	–	4	–	1
Colgate		–		3	–	5	–	0
Columbia		–		2	–	5	–	2
Hofstra		–		2	–	4	–	0
Carnegie Tech		–		2	–	5	–	1
Penn		–		2	–	5	–	1
Providence		–		2	–	6	–	0
Vermont		–		2	–	6	–	0
La Salle		–		2	–	7	–	0
Massachusetts State		–		1	–	7	–	1
Rankings from AP Poll

The 1937 Bucknell Bison football team was an American football team that represented Bucknell University as an independent during the 1937 college football season. In its first season under head coach Al Humphreys, the team compiled a 3–3–2 record.

The team played its home games at Memorial Stadium in Lewisburg, Pennsylvania.

== Schedule ==
Date	Opponent	Site	Result	Attendance	Source
September 24	Ursinus	New Beaver Field; State College, PA	W 21–0	7,500	
October 1	Lebanon Valley	Memorial Stadium; Lewisburg, PA	W 13–0		
October 9	at Penn State	New Beaver Field; State College, PA	L 14–20	11,376	
October 15	Miami (FL)	Memorial Stadium; Lewisburg, PA	T 6–6	7,500	
October 23	at Villanova	Shibe Park; Philadelphia, PA	L 0–21	3,500	
October 30	at Albright	Reading, PA	L 0–6	> 8,000	
November 6	at Furman	Sirrine Stadium; Greenville, SC	W 20–7	5,000	
November 13	Temple^{†}	Memorial Stadium; Lewisburg, PA	T 0–0	8,000	
^{†}Homecoming
