= 1937 Colgate Red Raiders football team =

American college football season

1937 Colgate Red Raiders football
- Conference: Independent
- Record: 3–5
- Head coach: Andrew Kerr (9th season)
- Captain: Marcel Chesbro
- Home stadium: Whitnall Field

1937 Eastern college football independents records
	Conf.			Overall
Team	W	L	T	W		L		T
No. 1 Pittsburgh		–		9	–	0	–	1
No. 6 Villanova		–		8	–	0	–	1
No. 3 Fordham		–		7	–	0	–	1
No. 7 Dartmouth		–		7	–	0	–	2
No. T–14 Holy Cross		–		8	–	0	–	2
St. Thomas (PA)		–		6	–	1	–	1
No. 12 Yale		–		6	–	1	–	1
Army		–		7	–	2	–	0
Boston University		–		6	–	2	–	0
Cornell		–		5	–	2	–	1
Harvard		–		5	–	2	–	1
Syracuse		–		5	–	2	–	1
CCNY		–		5	–	2	–	0
No. 12 Manhattan		–		6	–	3	–	1
Penn State		–		5	–	3	–	0
Duquesne		–		6	–	4	–	0
Brown		–		5	–	4	–	0
NYU		–		5	–	4	–	0
Temple		–		3	–	2	–	4
Boston College		–		4	–	4	–	1
Bucknell		–		3	–	3	–	2
Buffalo		–		4	–	4	–	0
Princeton		–		4	–	4	–	0
Tufts		–		3	–	4	–	1
Colgate		–		3	–	5	–	0
Columbia		–		2	–	5	–	2
Hofstra		–		2	–	4	–	0
Carnegie Tech		–		2	–	5	–	1
Penn		–		2	–	5	–	1
Providence		–		2	–	6	–	0
Vermont		–		2	–	6	–	0
La Salle		–		2	–	7	–	0
Massachusetts State		–		1	–	7	–	1
Rankings from AP Poll

The 1937 Colgate Red Raiders football team was an American football team that represented Colgate University as an independent during the 1937 college football season. In its ninth season under head coach Andrew Kerr, the team compiled a 3–5 record and outscored opponents by a total of 89 to 86. Marcel Chesbro was the team captain. The team played its home games on Whitnall Field in Hamilton, New York.

== Schedule ==
Date	Opponent	Site	Result	Attendance	Source
September 25	St. Lawrence	Whitnall Field; Hamilton, NY	W 21–0		
October 2	at Cornell	Schoellkopf Field; Ithaca, NY (rivalry)	L 7–40		
October 9	St. Bonaventure	Whitnall Field; Hamilton, NY	W 34–0		
October 16	vs. Tulane	Roesch Stadium; Buffalo, NY	L 6–7	32,524	
October 23	No. 10 Duke^{†}	Whitnall Field; Hamilton, NY	L 0–13	10,000	
October 30	at NYU	Yankee Stadium; Bronx, NY	L 7–14	25,000	
November 6	at Holy Cross	Fitton Field; Worcester, MA	L 7–12		
November 20	at Syracuse	Archbold Stadium; Syracuse, NY (rivalry)	W 7–0	34,000	
^{†}Homecoming; Rankings from AP Poll released prior to the game
