= 1937 Temple Owls football team =

American college football season

1937 Temple Owls football
- Conference: Independent
- Record: 3–2–4
- Head coach: Pop Warner (5th season)
- Home stadium: Temple Stadium

1937 Eastern college football independents records
	Conf.			Overall
Team	W	L	T	W		L		T
No. 1 Pittsburgh		–		9	–	0	–	1
No. 6 Villanova		–		8	–	0	–	1
No. 3 Fordham		–		7	–	0	–	1
No. 7 Dartmouth		–		7	–	0	–	2
No. T–14 Holy Cross		–		8	–	0	–	2
St. Thomas (PA)		–		6	–	1	–	1
No. 12 Yale		–		6	–	1	–	1
Army		–		7	–	2	–	0
Boston University		–		6	–	2	–	0
Cornell		–		5	–	2	–	1
Harvard		–		5	–	2	–	1
Syracuse		–		5	–	2	–	1
CCNY		–		5	–	2	–	0
No. 12 Manhattan		–		6	–	3	–	1
Penn State		–		5	–	3	–	0
Duquesne		–		6	–	4	–	0
Brown		–		5	–	4	–	0
NYU		–		5	–	4	–	0
Temple		–		3	–	2	–	4
Boston College		–		4	–	4	–	1
Bucknell		–		3	–	3	–	2
Buffalo		–		4	–	4	–	0
Princeton		–		4	–	4	–	0
Tufts		–		3	–	4	–	1
Colgate		–		3	–	5	–	0
Columbia		–		2	–	5	–	2
Hofstra		–		2	–	4	–	0
Carnegie Tech		–		2	–	5	–	1
Penn		–		2	–	5	–	1
Providence		–		2	–	6	–	0
Vermont		–		2	–	6	–	0
La Salle		–		2	–	7	–	0
Massachusetts State		–		1	–	7	–	1
Rankings from AP Poll

The 1937 Temple Owls football team was an American football team that represented Temple University as an independent during the 1937 college football season. In its fifth season under head coach Pop Warner, the team compiled a 3–2–4 record and was outscored by a total of 59 to 38. The team played its home games at Temple Stadium in Philadelphia.

== Schedule ==
Date	Opponent	Site	Result	Attendance	Source
September 24	VMI	Temple Stadium; Philadelphia, PA	W 18–7	15,000	
October 1	Ole Miss	Temple Stadium; Philadelphia, PA	T 0–0	15,000	
October 8	Florida	Temple Stadium; Philadelphia, PA	W 7–6		
October 12	at Boston College	Fenway Park; Boston, MA	T 0–0	25,000	
October 22	Carnegie Tech	Temple Stadium; Philadelphia, PA	W 7–0	25,000	
October 30	at No. T–18 Holy Cross	Fitton Field; Worcester, MA	T 0–0		
November 6	Michigan State	Temple Stadium; Philadelphia, PA	L 6–13	12,000	
November 13	at Bucknell	Memorial Stadium; Lewisburg, PA	T 0–0	8,000	
November 20	No. 10 Villanova	Temple Stadium; Philadelphia, PA	L 0–33	35,000	
Rankings from AP Poll released prior to the game
