= 1937 CCNY Beavers football team =

American college football season

1937 CCNY Beavers football
- Conference: Independent
- Record: 5–2
- Head coach: Benny Friedman (4th season)
- Home stadium: Lewisohn Stadium

1937 Eastern college football independents records
	Conf.			Overall
Team	W	L	T	W		L		T
No. 1 Pittsburgh		–		9	–	0	–	1
No. 6 Villanova		–		8	–	0	–	1
No. 3 Fordham		–		7	–	0	–	1
No. 7 Dartmouth		–		7	–	0	–	2
No. T–14 Holy Cross		–		8	–	0	–	2
St. Thomas (PA)		–		6	–	1	–	1
No. 12 Yale		–		6	–	1	–	1
Army		–		7	–	2	–	0
Boston University		–		6	–	2	–	0
Cornell		–		5	–	2	–	1
Harvard		–		5	–	2	–	1
Syracuse		–		5	–	2	–	1
CCNY		–		5	–	2	–	0
No. 12 Manhattan		–		6	–	3	–	1
Penn State		–		5	–	3	–	0
Duquesne		–		6	–	4	–	0
Brown		–		5	–	4	–	0
NYU		–		5	–	4	–	0
Temple		–		3	–	2	–	4
Boston College		–		4	–	4	–	1
Bucknell		–		3	–	3	–	2
Buffalo		–		4	–	4	–	0
Princeton		–		4	–	4	–	0
Tufts		–		3	–	4	–	1
Colgate		–		3	–	5	–	0
Columbia		–		2	–	5	–	2
Hofstra		–		2	–	4	–	0
Carnegie Tech		–		2	–	5	–	1
Penn		–		2	–	5	–	1
Providence		–		2	–	6	–	0
Vermont		–		2	–	6	–	0
La Salle		–		2	–	7	–	0
Massachusetts State		–		1	–	7	–	1
Rankings from AP Poll

The 1937 CCNY Beavers football team was an American football team that represented the City College of New York (CCNY) as an independent during the 1937 college football season. In their fourth season under head coach Benny Friedman, the team compiled a 5–2 record.

== Schedule ==
Date	Opponent	Site	Result	Attendance	Source
October 2	Brooklyn	Lewisohn Stadium; New York, NY	W 24–0	5,000	
October 9	Albright	Lewisohn Stadium; New York, NY	L 0–34		
October 16	at Susquehanna	Selinsgrove, PA	W 8–6	3,000	
October 23	at Hobart	Geneva, NY	L 7–13		
October 30	Providence	Lewisohn Stadium; New York, NY	W 8–6		
November 6	Saint Joseph's	Lewisohn Stadium; New York, NY	W 7–0		
November 13	at Moravian	Moravian Field; Bethlehem, PA	W 6–0	1,200	
