= 1937 St. Thomas (Pennsylvania) Tommies football team =

American college football season

1937 St. Thomas (Pennsylvania) Tommies football
- Conference: Independent
- Record: 6–1–1
- Head coach: Tom Davies (1st season)

1937 Eastern college football independents records
	Conf.			Overall
Team	W	L	T	W		L		T
No. 1 Pittsburgh		–		9	–	0	–	1
No. 6 Villanova		–		8	–	0	–	1
No. 3 Fordham		–		7	–	0	–	1
No. 7 Dartmouth		–		7	–	0	–	2
No. T–14 Holy Cross		–		8	–	0	–	2
St. Thomas (PA)		–		6	–	1	–	1
No. 12 Yale		–		6	–	1	–	1
Army		–		7	–	2	–	0
Boston University		–		6	–	2	–	0
Cornell		–		5	–	2	–	1
Harvard		–		5	–	2	–	1
Syracuse		–		5	–	2	–	1
CCNY		–		5	–	2	–	0
No. 12 Manhattan		–		6	–	3	–	1
Penn State		–		5	–	3	–	0
Duquesne		–		6	–	4	–	0
Brown		–		5	–	4	–	0
NYU		–		5	–	4	–	0
Temple		–		3	–	2	–	4
Boston College		–		4	–	4	–	1
Bucknell		–		3	–	3	–	2
Buffalo		–		4	–	4	–	0
Princeton		–		4	–	4	–	0
Tufts		–		3	–	4	–	1
Colgate		–		3	–	5	–	0
Columbia		–		2	–	5	–	2
Hofstra		–		2	–	4	–	0
Carnegie Tech		–		2	–	5	–	1
Penn		–		2	–	5	–	1
Providence		–		2	–	6	–	0
Vermont		–		2	–	6	–	0
La Salle		–		2	–	7	–	0
Massachusetts State		–		1	–	7	–	1
Rankings from AP Poll

The 1937 St. Thomas (Pennsylvania) Tommies football team was an American football team that represented St. Thomas College (later renamed the University of Scranton) during the 1937 college football season. The team compiled a 6–1–1 record and outscored opponents by a total of 109 to 33. The team played its home games at Athletic Park in Scranton, Pennsylvania.

Tom Davies, former back with the Pittsburgh Panthers, was hired in May 1937 as the school's head football coach. Robert "Pop" Jones was an assistant coach.

== Schedule ==
Date	Opponent	Site	Result	Attendance	Source
October 2	Mansfield State Teachers	Scranton, PA	W 38–0	6,500	
October 10	St. Mary's (TX)	Athletic Park; Scranton, PA	W 14–7	1,600	
October 17	at Saint Joseph's	Shibe Park; Philadelphia, PA	W 7–6	8,000	
October 24	St. Bonaventure	Athletic Park; Scranton, PA	L 6–7	6,000	
October 31	at Saint Vincent	Latrobe, PA	W 7–0	5,000	
November 7	Canisius	Athletic Park; Scranton, PA	W 12–7	6,500	
November 14	Mount St. Mary's	Athletic Park; Scranton, PA	T 6–6	6,000	
November 28	La Salle	Athletic Park; Scranton, PA	W 19–0	4,200	
