= 1937 NYU Violets football team =

American college football season

1937 NYU Violets football
- Conference: Independent
- Record: 5–4
- Head coach: Mal Stevens (4th season)
- Home stadium: Ohio Field; Polo Grounds; Yankee Stadium

1937 Eastern college football independents records
	Conf.			Overall
Team	W	L	T	W		L		T
No. 1 Pittsburgh		–		9	–	0	–	1
No. 6 Villanova		–		8	–	0	–	1
No. 3 Fordham		–		7	–	0	–	1
No. 7 Dartmouth		–		7	–	0	–	2
No. T–14 Holy Cross		–		8	–	0	–	2
St. Thomas (PA)		–		6	–	1	–	1
No. 12 Yale		–		6	–	1	–	1
Army		–		7	–	2	–	0
Boston University		–		6	–	2	–	0
Cornell		–		5	–	2	–	1
Harvard		–		5	–	2	–	1
Syracuse		–		5	–	2	–	1
CCNY		–		5	–	2	–	0
No. 12 Manhattan		–		6	–	3	–	1
Penn State		–		5	–	3	–	0
Duquesne		–		6	–	4	–	0
Brown		–		5	–	4	–	0
NYU		–		5	–	4	–	0
Temple		–		3	–	2	–	4
Boston College		–		4	–	4	–	1
Bucknell		–		3	–	3	–	2
Buffalo		–		4	–	4	–	0
Princeton		–		4	–	4	–	0
Tufts		–		3	–	4	–	1
Colgate		–		3	–	5	–	0
Columbia		–		2	–	5	–	2
Hofstra		–		2	–	4	–	0
Carnegie Tech		–		2	–	5	–	1
Penn		–		2	–	5	–	1
Providence		–		2	–	6	–	0
Vermont		–		2	–	6	–	0
La Salle		–		2	–	7	–	0
Massachusetts State		–		1	–	7	–	1
Rankings from AP Poll

The 1937 NYU Violets football team was an American football team that represented New York University as an independent during the 1937 college football season. In their fourth year under head coach Mal Stevens, the team compiled a 5–4 record.

== Schedule ==
Date	Opponent	Site	Result	Attendance	Source
September 25	Pennsylvania Military	Ohio Field; Bronx, NY	W 37–7	10,000	
October 2	at Carnegie Tech	Pitt Stadium; Pittsburgh, PA	W 18–14	20,000	
October 9	North Carolina	Ohio Field; Bronx, NY	L 6–19	15,000	
October 16	St. John's (MD)	Ohio Field; Bronx, NY	W 59–0	5,000	
October 23	Lafayette	Yankee Stadium; Bronx, NY	L 0–13	7,500	
October 30	Colgate	Yankee Stadium; Bronx, NY	W 14–7	25,000	
November 6	Lehigh	Yankee Stadium; Bronx, NY	W 13–0	11,000	
November 13	Georgetown	Polo Grounds; New York, NY	L 0–6	8,000	
November 27	vs. No. 3 Fordham	Yankee Stadium; Bronx, NY	L 7–20	65,000	
Rankings from AP Poll released prior to the game
