= 1937 Buffalo Bulls football team =

American college football season

1937 Buffalo Bulls football
- Conference: Independent
- Record: 4–4
- Head coach: Jim Peele (2nd season)
- Captain: Dan Dalfanso
- Home stadium: Rotary Field

1937 Eastern college football independents records
	Conf.			Overall
Team	W	L	T	W		L		T
No. 1 Pittsburgh		–		9	–	0	–	1
No. 6 Villanova		–		8	–	0	–	1
No. 3 Fordham		–		7	–	0	–	1
No. 7 Dartmouth		–		7	–	0	–	2
No. T–14 Holy Cross		–		8	–	0	–	2
St. Thomas (PA)		–		6	–	1	–	1
No. 12 Yale		–		6	–	1	–	1
Army		–		7	–	2	–	0
Boston University		–		6	–	2	–	0
Cornell		–		5	–	2	–	1
Harvard		–		5	–	2	–	1
Syracuse		–		5	–	2	–	1
CCNY		–		5	–	2	–	0
No. 12 Manhattan		–		6	–	3	–	1
Penn State		–		5	–	3	–	0
Duquesne		–		6	–	4	–	0
Brown		–		5	–	4	–	0
NYU		–		5	–	4	–	0
Temple		–		3	–	2	–	4
Boston College		–		4	–	4	–	1
Bucknell		–		3	–	3	–	2
Buffalo		–		4	–	4	–	0
Princeton		–		4	–	4	–	0
Tufts		–		3	–	4	–	1
Colgate		–		3	–	5	–	0
Columbia		–		2	–	5	–	2
Hofstra		–		2	–	4	–	0
Carnegie Tech		–		2	–	5	–	1
Penn		–		2	–	5	–	1
Providence		–		2	–	6	–	0
Vermont		–		2	–	6	–	0
La Salle		–		2	–	7	–	0
Massachusetts State		–		1	–	7	–	1
Rankings from AP Poll

The 1937 Buffalo Bulls football team was an American football team that represented the University of Buffalo as an independent during the 1937 college football season. In their second season under head coach Jim Peele, the Bulls compiled a 4–4 record and were outscored by a total of 94 to 89. The team played its home games at Rotary Field in Buffalo, New York.

== Schedule ==
Date	Opponent	Site	Result	Source
October 2	at Allegheny	Meadville, PA	W 14–7	
October 9	Rochester	Rotary Field; Buffalo, NY	W 12–7	
October 16	Alfred	Rotary Field; Buffalo, NY	L 13–25	
October 23	Kent State	Rotary Field; Buffalo, NY	W 13–0	
October 30	Defiance	Rotary Field; Buffalo, NY	W 12–7	
November 6	at Hobart	Boswell Field; Geneva, NY	L 7–12	
November 13	Wayne	Rotary Field; Buffalo, NY	L 6–23	
November 20	at RPI	Troy, NY	L 12–13	
