= 1937 Princeton Tigers football team =

American college football season

1937 Princeton Tigers football
- Conference: Independent
- Record: 4–4
- Head coach: Fritz Crisler (6th season)
- Captain: Charlie Toll
- Home stadium: Palmer Stadium

1937 Eastern college football independents records
	Conf.			Overall
Team	W	L	T	W		L		T
No. 1 Pittsburgh		–		9	–	0	–	1
No. 6 Villanova		–		8	–	0	–	1
No. 3 Fordham		–		7	–	0	–	1
No. 7 Dartmouth		–		7	–	0	–	2
No. T–14 Holy Cross		–		8	–	0	–	2
St. Thomas (PA)		–		6	–	1	–	1
No. 12 Yale		–		6	–	1	–	1
Army		–		7	–	2	–	0
Boston University		–		6	–	2	–	0
Cornell		–		5	–	2	–	1
Harvard		–		5	–	2	–	1
Syracuse		–		5	–	2	–	1
CCNY		–		5	–	2	–	0
No. 12 Manhattan		–		6	–	3	–	1
Penn State		–		5	–	3	–	0
Duquesne		–		6	–	4	–	0
Brown		–		5	–	4	–	0
NYU		–		5	–	4	–	0
Temple		–		3	–	2	–	4
Boston College		–		4	–	4	–	1
Bucknell		–		3	–	3	–	2
Buffalo		–		4	–	4	–	0
Princeton		–		4	–	4	–	0
Tufts		–		3	–	4	–	1
Colgate		–		3	–	5	–	0
Columbia		–		2	–	5	–	2
Hofstra		–		2	–	4	–	0
Carnegie Tech		–		2	–	5	–	1
Penn		–		2	–	5	–	1
Providence		–		2	–	6	–	0
Vermont		–		2	–	6	–	0
La Salle		–		2	–	7	–	0
Massachusetts State		–		1	–	7	–	1
Rankings from AP Poll

The 1937 Princeton Tigers football team was an American football team that represented Princeton University as an independent during the 1937 college football season. In its sixth and final season under head coach Fritz Crisler, the team compiled a 4–4 record and was outscored by a total of 126 to 96. The team played its home games at Palmer Stadium in Princeton, New Jersey.

Tackle Charlie Toll was the team captain. Halfback Jack H. White received the John Prentiss Poe Cup, the team's highest award. No Princeton players were selected by the Associated Press to the 1937 All-Eastern college football team.

On February 9, 1938, Crisler announced his resignation at Princeton in order to assume the head coaching position at the University of Michigan.

== Schedule ==
Date	Opponent	Site	Result	Attendance	Source
October 2	Virginia	Palmer Stadium; Princeton, NJ	W 26–0	15,000	
October 9	Cornell	Palmer Stadium; Princeton, NJ	L 7–20	45,000	
October 16	at Chicago	Stagg Field; Chicago, IL	W 16–7	20,000	
October 23	Rutgers	Palmer Stadium; Princeton, NJ (rivalry)	W 6–0	35,000	
October 30	Harvard	Palmer Stadium; Princeton, NJ (rivalry)	L 6–34	48,000	
November 6	No. 9 Dartmouth	Palmer Stadium; Princeton, NJ	L 9–33	38,000	
November 13	at No. 6 Yale	Yale Bowl; New Haven, CT (rivalry)	L 0–26	40,000	
November 20	Navy	Palmer Stadium; Princeton, NJ	W 26–6	48,000	
Rankings from AP Poll released prior to the game
