= 1937 Army Cadets football team =

American college football season

1937 Army Cadets football
- Conference: Independent
- Record: 7–2
- Head coach: Garrison H. Davidson (5th season)
- Captain: James Isbell
- Home stadium: Michie Stadium

1937 Eastern college football independents records
| | Conf. | | | Overall |
| Team | W | L | T | W | | L | | T |
|---|---|---|---|---|---|---|---|---|
| No. 1 Pittsburgh | | – | | 9 | – | 0 | – | 1 |
| No. 6 Villanova | | – | | 8 | – | 0 | – | 1 |
| No. 3 Fordham | | – | | 7 | – | 0 | – | 1 |
| No. 7 Dartmouth | | – | | 7 | – | 0 | – | 2 |
| No. T–14 Holy Cross | | – | | 8 | – | 0 | – | 2 |
| St. Thomas (PA) | | – | | 6 | – | 1 | – | 1 |
| No. 12 Yale | | – | | 6 | – | 1 | – | 1 |
| Army | | – | | 7 | – | 2 | – | 0 |
| Boston University | | – | | 6 | – | 2 | – | 0 |
| Cornell | | – | | 5 | – | 2 | – | 1 |
| Harvard | | – | | 5 | – | 2 | – | 1 |
| Syracuse | | – | | 5 | – | 2 | – | 1 |
| CCNY | | – | | 5 | – | 2 | – | 0 |
| No. 12 Manhattan | | – | | 6 | – | 3 | – | 1 |
| Penn State | | – | | 5 | – | 3 | – | 0 |
| Duquesne | | – | | 6 | – | 4 | – | 0 |
| Brown | | – | | 5 | – | 4 | – | 0 |
| NYU | | – | | 5 | – | 4 | – | 0 |
| Temple | | – | | 3 | – | 2 | – | 4 |
| Boston College | | – | | 4 | – | 4 | – | 1 |
| Bucknell | | – | | 3 | – | 3 | – | 2 |
| Buffalo | | – | | 4 | – | 4 | – | 0 |
| Princeton | | – | | 4 | – | 4 | – | 0 |
| Tufts | | – | | 3 | – | 4 | – | 1 |
| Colgate | | – | | 3 | – | 5 | – | 0 |
| Columbia | | – | | 2 | – | 5 | – | 2 |
| Hofstra | | – | | 2 | – | 4 | – | 0 |
| Carnegie Tech | | – | | 2 | – | 5 | – | 1 |
| Penn | | – | | 2 | – | 5 | – | 1 |
| Providence | | – | | 2 | – | 6 | – | 0 |
| Vermont | | – | | 2 | – | 6 | – | 0 |
| La Salle | | – | | 2 | – | 7 | – | 0 |
| Massachusetts State | | – | | 1 | – | 7 | – | 1 |
Rankings from AP Poll

The 1937 Army Cadets football team represented the United States Military Academy as an independent during the 1937 college football season. In their fifth and final year under head coach Garrison H. Davidson, the Cadets compiled a 7–2 record and outscored their opponents by a combined total of 176 to 72. In the annual Army–Navy Game, the Cadets defeated the Midshipmen by a 6 to 0 score. The Cadets' two losses came against Yale and Notre Dame.

No Army players were recognized on the 1937 College Football All-America Team.

== Schedule ==
| Date | Opponent | Site | Result | Attendance | Source |
|---|---|---|---|---|---|
| October 2 | Clemson | Michie Stadium; West Point, NY | W 21–6 | 10,000 | |
| October 9 | Columbia | Michie Stadium; West Point, NY | W 21–18 | 20,000 | |
| October 16 | at Yale | Yale Bowl; New Haven, CT | L 7–15 | | |
| October 23 | Washington University | Michie Stadium; West Point, NY | W 47–7 | 5,000 | |
| October 30 | VMI | Michie Stadium; West Point, NY | W 20–7 | 27,000 | |
| November 6 | at Harvard | Harvard Stadium; Boston, MA | W 7–6 | 50,000 | |
| November 13 | vs. No. 18 Notre Dame | Yankee Stadium; Bronx, NY (rivalry) | L 0–7 | 76,359 | |
| November 20 | St. John's (MD) | Michie Stadium; West Point, NY | W 47–6 | | |
| November 27 | vs. Navy | Philadelphia Municipal Stadium; Philadelphia, PA (Army–Navy Game) | W 6–0 | | |
Rankings from AP Poll released prior to the game
