= 1937 Columbia Lions football team =

American college football season

1937 Columbia Lions football
- Conference: Independent
- Record: 2–5–2
- Head coach: Lou Little (8th season)
- Captains: John Bateman; Oscar Bonom
- Home stadium: Baker Field

1937 Eastern college football independents records
	Conf.			Overall
Team	W	L	T	W		L		T
No. 1 Pittsburgh		–		9	–	0	–	1
No. 6 Villanova		–		8	–	0	–	1
No. 3 Fordham		–		7	–	0	–	1
No. 7 Dartmouth		–		7	–	0	–	2
No. T–14 Holy Cross		–		8	–	0	–	2
St. Thomas (PA)		–		6	–	1	–	1
No. 12 Yale		–		6	–	1	–	1
Army		–		7	–	2	–	0
Boston University		–		6	–	2	–	0
Cornell		–		5	–	2	–	1
Harvard		–		5	–	2	–	1
Syracuse		–		5	–	2	–	1
CCNY		–		5	–	2	–	0
No. 12 Manhattan		–		6	–	3	–	1
Penn State		–		5	–	3	–	0
Duquesne		–		6	–	4	–	0
Brown		–		5	–	4	–	0
NYU		–		5	–	4	–	0
Temple		–		3	–	2	–	4
Boston College		–		4	–	4	–	1
Bucknell		–		3	–	3	–	2
Buffalo		–		4	–	4	–	0
Princeton		–		4	–	4	–	0
Tufts		–		3	–	4	–	1
Colgate		–		3	–	5	–	0
Columbia		–		2	–	5	–	2
Hofstra		–		2	–	4	–	0
Carnegie Tech		–		2	–	5	–	1
Penn		–		2	–	5	–	1
Providence		–		2	–	6	–	0
Vermont		–		2	–	6	–	0
La Salle		–		2	–	7	–	0
Massachusetts State		–		1	–	7	–	1
Rankings from AP Poll

The 1937 Columbia Lions football team was an American football team that represented Columbia University as an independent during the 1937 college football season. In his eighth season, head coach Lou Little led the team to a 2–5–2 record, though the Lions were only outscored 102 to 100 by opponents.

The team played its home games at Baker Field in Upper Manhattan.

== Schedule ==
Date	Opponent	Site	Result	Attendance	Source
October 2	Williams	Baker Field; New York, NY	W 40–6	14,000	
October 9	at Army	Michie Stadium; West Point, NY	L 18–21	20,000	
October 16	Penn	Baker Field; New York, NY	W 26–6	28,000	
October 23	Brown	Baker Field; New York, NY	L 6–7	8,000	
October 30	at Cornell	Schoellkopf Field; Ithaca, NY (rivalry)	L 0–14	12,000	
November 6	at Navy	Thompson Stadium; Annapolis, MD	L 6–13	20,000	
November 13	Syracuse	Baker Field; New York, NY	T 6–6	12,000	
November 20	No. 9 Dartmouth	Baker Field; New York, NY	L 0–27	22,000	
November 27	Stanford	Baker Field; New York, NY	T 0–0	20,000	
Rankings from AP Poll released prior to the game
