= 1937 Vermont Catamounts football team =

American college football season

1937 Vermont Catamounts football
- Conference: Independent
- Record: 2–6
- Head coach: John P. Sabo (4th season)
- Home stadium: Centennial Field

1937 Eastern college football independents records
	Conf.			Overall
Team	W	L	T	W		L		T
No. 1 Pittsburgh		–		9	–	0	–	1
No. 6 Villanova		–		8	–	0	–	1
No. 3 Fordham		–		7	–	0	–	1
No. 7 Dartmouth		–		7	–	0	–	2
No. T–14 Holy Cross		–		8	–	0	–	2
St. Thomas (PA)		–		6	–	1	–	1
No. 12 Yale		–		6	–	1	–	1
Army		–		7	–	2	–	0
Boston University		–		6	–	2	–	0
Cornell		–		5	–	2	–	1
Harvard		–		5	–	2	–	1
Syracuse		–		5	–	2	–	1
CCNY		–		5	–	2	–	0
No. 12 Manhattan		–		6	–	3	–	1
Penn State		–		5	–	3	–	0
Duquesne		–		6	–	4	–	0
Brown		–		5	–	4	–	0
NYU		–		5	–	4	–	0
Temple		–		3	–	2	–	4
Boston College		–		4	–	4	–	1
Bucknell		–		3	–	3	–	2
Buffalo		–		4	–	4	–	0
Princeton		–		4	–	4	–	0
Tufts		–		3	–	4	–	1
Colgate		–		3	–	5	–	0
Columbia		–		2	–	5	–	2
Hofstra		–		2	–	4	–	0
Carnegie Tech		–		2	–	5	–	1
Penn		–		2	–	5	–	1
Providence		–		2	–	6	–	0
Vermont		–		2	–	6	–	0
La Salle		–		2	–	7	–	0
Massachusetts State		–		1	–	7	–	1
Rankings from AP Poll

The 1937 Vermont Catamounts football team was an American football team representing the University of Vermont as an independent during the 1937 college football season. Coached by John P. Sabo in his fourth year, the team finished the season with a 2–6 record.

== Schedule ==
Date	Opponent	Site	Result	Attendance	Source
September 25	at Amherst	Pratt Field; Amherst, MA	L 13–28		
October 2	RPI	Troy, NY	W 7–6		
October 9	Williams	Centennial Field; Burlington, VT	L 6–53	3,000	
October 16	Union (NY)	Centennial Field; Burlington, VT	L 6–17		
October 23	at New Hampshire	Lewis Field; Durham, NH	L 0–34		
October 30	at Norwich	Sabine Field; Northfield, VT	W 18–6		
November 6	St. Lawrence	Centennial Field; Burlington, VT	L 0–31	1,000	
November 13	Middlebury	Centennial Field; Burlington, VT	L 0–7		
