= 1937 Cornell Big Red football team =

American college football season

1937 Cornell Big Red football
- Conference: Independent
- Record: 5–2–1
- Head coach: Carl Snavely (2nd season)
- Offensive scheme: Single-wing
- Captain: Edward "Ted" Hughes
- Home stadium: Schoellkopf Field

1937 Eastern college football independents records
	Conf.			Overall
Team	W	L	T	W		L		T
No. 1 Pittsburgh		–		9	–	0	–	1
No. 6 Villanova		–		8	–	0	–	1
No. 3 Fordham		–		7	–	0	–	1
No. 7 Dartmouth		–		7	–	0	–	2
No. T–14 Holy Cross		–		8	–	0	–	2
St. Thomas (PA)		–		6	–	1	–	1
No. 12 Yale		–		6	–	1	–	1
Army		–		7	–	2	–	0
Boston University		–		6	–	2	–	0
Cornell		–		5	–	2	–	1
Harvard		–		5	–	2	–	1
Syracuse		–		5	–	2	–	1
CCNY		–		5	–	2	–	0
No. 12 Manhattan		–		6	–	3	–	1
Penn State		–		5	–	3	–	0
Duquesne		–		6	–	4	–	0
Brown		–		5	–	4	–	0
NYU		–		5	–	4	–	0
Temple		–		3	–	2	–	4
Boston College		–		4	–	4	–	1
Bucknell		–		3	–	3	–	2
Buffalo		–		4	–	4	–	0
Princeton		–		4	–	4	–	0
Tufts		–		3	–	4	–	1
Colgate		–		3	–	5	–	0
Columbia		–		2	–	5	–	2
Hofstra		–		2	–	4	–	0
Carnegie Tech		–		2	–	5	–	1
Penn		–		2	–	5	–	1
Providence		–		2	–	6	–	0
Vermont		–		2	–	6	–	0
La Salle		–		2	–	7	–	0
Massachusetts State		–		1	–	7	–	1
Rankings from AP Poll

The 1937 Cornell Big Red football team was an American football team that represented Cornell University during the 1937 college football season. In their second season under head coach Carl Snavely, the Big Red compiled a 5–2–1 record and outscored their opponents by a combined total of 146 to 82.

== Schedule ==
Date	Opponent	Rank	Site	Result	Attendance	Source
September 25	Penn State		Schoellkopf Field; Ithaca, NY	W 26–19	6,000	
October 2	Colgate		Schoellkopf Field; Ithaca, NY (rivalry)	W 40–7		
October 9	at Princeton		Palmer Stadium; Princeton, NJ	W 20–7		
October 16	Syracuse		Schoellkopf Field; Ithaca, NY	L 6–14	18,000	
October 23	at No. 5 Yale	No. 19	Yale Bowl; New Haven, CT	L 0–9		
October 30	Columbia		Schoellkopf Field; Ithaca, NY (rivalry)	W 14–0	12,000	
November 13	at No. 5 Dartmouth		Memorial Field; Hanover, NH (rivalry)	T 6–6		
November 25	at Penn		Franklin Field; Philadelphia, PA (rivalry)	W 34–20		
Rankings from AP Poll released prior to the game
