= 1937 Maine Black Bears football team =

American college football season

1937 Maine Black Bears football
- Conference: New England Conference, Maine Intercollegiate Athletic Association
- Record: 2–3–2 (0–1–1 New England, 1–1–1 MIAA)
- Head coach: Fred Brice (17th season)
- Captain: Ernest Reidman
- Home stadium: Alumni Field

1937 New England Conference football standings
	Conf.					Overall
Team	W		L		T	W		L		T
New Hampshire +	1	–	0	–	0	7	–	1	–	0
Connecticut State +	1	–	0	–	0	6	–	2	–	1
Maine	0	–	1	–	1	2	–	3	–	2
Rhode Island State	0	–	2	–	1	3	–	4	–	1
+ – Conference co-champions

The 1937 Maine Black Bears football team was an American football team that represented the University of Maine as a member of the New England Conference and Maine Intercollegiate Athletic Association during the 1937 college football season. In its 17th season under head coach Fred Brice, the team compiled a 2–3–2 record (0–1–1 against New England conference and 1–1–1 against MIAA opponents). The team played its home games at Alumni Field in Orono, Maine. Ernest Reidman was the team captain.

== Schedule ==
Date	Opponent	Site	Result	Source
September 25	Rhode Island State	Alumni Field; Orono, ME	T 0–0	
October 2	at Yale*	Yale Bowl; New Haven, CT	L 0–26	
October 9	New Hampshire	Alumni Field; Orono, ME (rivalry)	L 0–13	
October 16	Arnold*	Alumni Field; Orono, ME	W 13–0	
October 23	at Bates	Garcelon Field; Lewiston, ME	L 0–7	
October 30	at Colby	Seaverns Field; Waterville, ME	W 13–0	
November 6	Bowdoin	Alumni Field; Orono, ME	T 6–6	
*Non-conference game
