= 1937 Holy Cross Crusaders football team =

American college football season

1937 Holy Cross Crusaders football
- Conference: Independent

Ranking
- AP: No. T–14
- Record: 8–0–2
- Head coach: Eddie Anderson (5th season)
- Home stadium: Fitton Field; Fenway Park (alternate)

1937 Eastern college football independents records
	Conf.			Overall
Team	W	L	T	W		L		T
No. 1 Pittsburgh		–		9	–	0	–	1
No. 6 Villanova		–		8	–	0	–	1
No. 3 Fordham		–		7	–	0	–	1
No. 7 Dartmouth		–		7	–	0	–	2
No. T–14 Holy Cross		–		8	–	0	–	2
St. Thomas (PA)		–		6	–	1	–	1
No. 12 Yale		–		6	–	1	–	1
Army		–		7	–	2	–	0
Boston University		–		6	–	2	–	0
Cornell		–		5	–	2	–	1
Harvard		–		5	–	2	–	1
Syracuse		–		5	–	2	–	1
CCNY		–		5	–	2	–	0
No. 12 Manhattan		–		6	–	3	–	1
Penn State		–		5	–	3	–	0
Duquesne		–		6	–	4	–	0
Brown		–		5	–	4	–	0
NYU		–		5	–	4	–	0
Temple		–		3	–	2	–	4
Boston College		–		4	–	4	–	1
Bucknell		–		3	–	3	–	2
Buffalo		–		4	–	4	–	0
Princeton		–		4	–	4	–	0
Tufts		–		3	–	4	–	1
Colgate		–		3	–	5	–	0
Columbia		–		2	–	5	–	2
Hofstra		–		2	–	4	–	0
Carnegie Tech		–		2	–	5	–	1
Penn		–		2	–	5	–	1
Providence		–		2	–	6	–	0
Vermont		–		2	–	6	–	0
La Salle		–		2	–	7	–	0
Massachusetts State		–		1	–	7	–	1
Rankings from AP Poll

The 1937 Holy Cross Crusaders football team represented the College of the Holy Cross during the 1937 college football season. The Crusaders were led by fifth-year head coach Eddie Anderson and played their home games at Fitton Field in Worcester, Massachusetts and Fenway Park in Boston. Despite losing key defensive players from the year prior, the Crusaders' defense was one of the best in the country, allowing only three touchdowns all season. Holy Cross went undefeated on the year, with a record of 8–0–2, finishing tied for 14th in the final AP poll.

== Schedule ==
Date	Opponent	Rank	Site	Result	Attendance	Source
September 25	Saint Anselm		Fitton Field; Worcester, MA	W 21–0	15,000	
October 2	Providence		Fitton Field; Worcester, MA	W 7–0		
October 9	Georgetown		Fitton Field; Worcester, MA	W 27–6		
October 16	Georgia		Fenway Park; Boston, MA	W 7–6		
October 23	Western Maryland	No. T–20	Fitton Field; Worcester, MA	W 6–0		
October 30	Temple	No. T–18	Fitton Field; Worcester, MA	T 0–0		
November 6	Colgate		Fitton Field; Worcester, MA	W 12–7		
November 13	at Brown	No. 19	Brown Stadium; Providence, RI	W 7–0		
November 20	Carnegie Tech	No. 14	Fitton Field; Worcester, MA	T 0–0		
November 27	vs. Boston College	No. 17	Fenway Park; Boston, MA (rivalry)	W 20–0	35,000	
Rankings from AP Poll released prior to the game; Source:
