= 1937 Harvard Crimson football team =

American college football season

1937 Harvard Crimson football
- Conference: Independent
- Record: 5–2–1
- Head coach: Dick Harlow (3rd season)
- Home stadium: Harvard Stadium

1937 Eastern college football independents records
	Conf.			Overall
Team	W	L	T	W		L		T
No. 1 Pittsburgh		–		9	–	0	–	1
No. 6 Villanova		–		8	–	0	–	1
No. 3 Fordham		–		7	–	0	–	1
No. 7 Dartmouth		–		7	–	0	–	2
No. T–14 Holy Cross		–		8	–	0	–	2
St. Thomas (PA)		–		6	–	1	–	1
No. 12 Yale		–		6	–	1	–	1
Army		–		7	–	2	–	0
Boston University		–		6	–	2	–	0
Cornell		–		5	–	2	–	1
Harvard		–		5	–	2	–	1
Syracuse		–		5	–	2	–	1
CCNY		–		5	–	2	–	0
No. 12 Manhattan		–		6	–	3	–	1
Penn State		–		5	–	3	–	0
Duquesne		–		6	–	4	–	0
Brown		–		5	–	4	–	0
NYU		–		5	–	4	–	0
Temple		–		3	–	2	–	4
Boston College		–		4	–	4	–	1
Bucknell		–		3	–	3	–	2
Buffalo		–		4	–	4	–	0
Princeton		–		4	–	4	–	0
Tufts		–		3	–	4	–	1
Colgate		–		3	–	5	–	0
Columbia		–		2	–	5	–	2
Hofstra		–		2	–	4	–	0
Carnegie Tech		–		2	–	5	–	1
Penn		–		2	–	5	–	1
Providence		–		2	–	6	–	0
Vermont		–		2	–	6	–	0
La Salle		–		2	–	7	–	0
Massachusetts State		–		1	–	7	–	1
Rankings from AP Poll

The 1937 Harvard Crimson football team was an American football team that represented Harvard University as an independent during the 1937 college football season. In its third season under head coach Dick Harlow, the team compiled a 5–2–1 record and outscored opponents by a total of 158 to 46.

Key players included fullback Vernon Struck, halfbacks Torbert "Torby" Macdonald and Frank Foley, quarterback Chief Boston, ends Don Daughters and Bobby Green, center Cliff Wilson, guard Joe Nee, and tackles Ken Booth and Al Kevorkian. Russ Allen was the team captain.

The team played its home games at Harvard Stadium in Cambridge, Massachusetts.

== Schedule ==
Date	Opponent	Site	Result	Attendance	Source
October 2	Springfield	Harvard Stadium; Boston, MA	W 54–0	10,000	
October 9	Brown	Harvard Stadium; Boston, MA	W 34–7	15,000	
October 16	vs. Navy	Municipal Stadium; Baltimore, MD	T 0–0	54,000	
October 23	No. 18 Dartmouth	Harvard Stadium; Boston, MA (rivalry)	L 2–20	50,000	
October 30	at Princeton	Princeton, NJ (rivalry)	W 34–6	48,000	
November 6	Army	Harvard Stadium; Boston, MA	L 6–7	50,000	
November 13	Davidson	Harvard Stadium; Boston, MA	W 15–0	3,000	
November 20	No. 5 Yale	Harvard Stadium; Boston, MA (rivalry)	W 13–6	58,000	
Rankings from AP Poll released prior to the game
