= 1937 Dartmouth Indians football team =

American college football season

1937 Dartmouth Indians football
- Conference: Independent

Ranking
- AP: No. 7
- Record: 7–0–2
- Head coach: Earl Blaik (4th season)
- Home stadium: Memorial Field

1937 Eastern college football independents records
	Conf.			Overall
Team	W	L	T	W		L		T
No. 1 Pittsburgh		–		9	–	0	–	1
No. 6 Villanova		–		8	–	0	–	1
No. 3 Fordham		–		7	–	0	–	1
No. 7 Dartmouth		–		7	–	0	–	2
No. T–14 Holy Cross		–		8	–	0	–	2
St. Thomas (PA)		–		6	–	1	–	1
No. 12 Yale		–		6	–	1	–	1
Army		–		7	–	2	–	0
Boston University		–		6	–	2	–	0
Cornell		–		5	–	2	–	1
Harvard		–		5	–	2	–	1
Syracuse		–		5	–	2	–	1
CCNY		–		5	–	2	–	0
No. 12 Manhattan		–		6	–	3	–	1
Penn State		–		5	–	3	–	0
Duquesne		–		6	–	4	–	0
Brown		–		5	–	4	–	0
NYU		–		5	–	4	–	0
Temple		–		3	–	2	–	4
Boston College		–		4	–	4	–	1
Bucknell		–		3	–	3	–	2
Buffalo		–		4	–	4	–	0
Princeton		–		4	–	4	–	0
Tufts		–		3	–	4	–	1
Colgate		–		3	–	5	–	0
Columbia		–		2	–	5	–	2
Hofstra		–		2	–	4	–	0
Carnegie Tech		–		2	–	5	–	1
Penn		–		2	–	5	–	1
Providence		–		2	–	6	–	0
Vermont		–		2	–	6	–	0
La Salle		–		2	–	7	–	0
Massachusetts State		–		1	–	7	–	1
Rankings from AP Poll

The 1937 Dartmouth Indians football team represented Dartmouth College in the 1937 college football season. The Indians were led by fourth-year head coach Earl Blaik and played their home games at Memorial Field in Hanover, New Hampshire. The Indians finished undefeated with a record of 7–0–2, finishing No. 7 in the final AP Poll, their highest ever finish. Dartmouth was invited to play in the 1938 Rose Bowl, but declined the invitation.

== Schedule ==
Date	Opponent	Rank	Site	Result	Attendance	Source
September 25	Bates		Memorial Field; Hanover, NH	W 39–0		
October 2	Amherst		Memorial Field; Hanover, NH	W 31–7		
October 9	Springfield		Memorial Field; Hanover, NH	W 42–0		
October 16	at Brown		Brown Stadium; Providence, RI	W 41–0		
October 23	at Harvard	No. 18	Harvard Stadium; Boston, MA (rivalry)	W 20–2	50,000	
October 30	at No. 5 Yale	No. 9	Yale Bowl; New Haven, CT	T 9–9		
November 6	at Princeton	No. 9	Palmer Stadium; Princeton, NJ	W 33–9		
November 13	Cornell	No. 5	Memorial Field; Hanover, NH (rivalry)	T 6–6		
November 20	at Columbia	No. 9	Baker Field; New York, NY	W 27–0		
Rankings from AP Poll released prior to the game; Source:
