= 1937 New Hampshire Wildcats football team =

American college football season

1937 New Hampshire Wildcats football
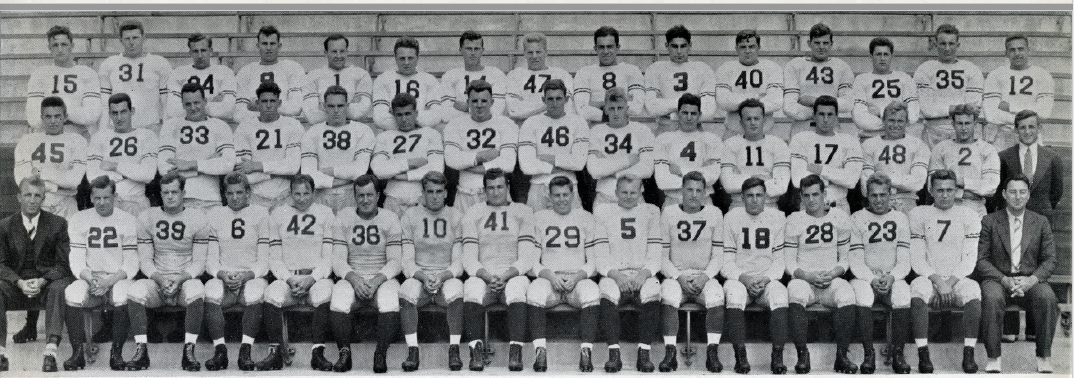
- Conference: New England Conference
- Record: 7–1 (1–0 New England)
- Head coach: George Sauer (1st season)
- Captain: Edward Little
- Home stadium: Lewis Field

1937 New England Conference football standings
	Conf.					Overall
Team	W		L		T	W		L		T
New Hampshire +	1	–	0	–	0	7	–	1	–	0
Connecticut State +	1	–	0	–	0	6	–	2	–	1
Maine	0	–	1	–	1	2	–	3	–	2
Rhode Island State	0	–	2	–	1	3	–	4	–	1
+ – Conference co-champions

The 1937 New Hampshire Wildcats football team was an American football team that represented the University of New Hampshire as a member of the New England Conference during the 1937 college football season. In its first year under head coach George Sauer, the team compiled a 7–1 record, outscoring their opponents 144–31. Five of the team's wins were by shutout. The team played its home games at Lewis Field (also known as Lewis Stadium) in Durham, New Hampshire.

Sauer was named head coach of the Wildcats on July 19, 1937, succeeding William "Butch" Cowell who had coached the team from 1915 through 1936.

== Schedule ==
Date	Opponent	Site	Result	Attendance	Source
September 25	Lowell Textile* (Note: Lowell Textile is now University of Massachusetts Lowell.)	Lewis Field; Durham, NH	W 20–0		
October 2	Bates*	Lewis Field; Durham, NH	W 21–12		
October 9	at Maine	Alumni Field; Orono, ME (rivalry)	W 13–0		
October 16	Colby*	Lewis Field; Durham, NH	W 33–0		
October 23	Vermont*	Lewis Field; Durham, NH	W 34–0		
October 30	at Saint Anselm*	Manchester, NH	L 6–13	8,000	
November 6	Tufts*^{†}	Lewis Field; Durham, NH	W 3–0		
November 13	at Springfield*	Pratt Field; Springfield, MA	W 14–6		
*Non-conference game; ^{†}Homecoming; Source:

The game in Manchester against St. Anselm was attended by Governor of New Hampshire Francis P. Murphy.

Wildcat Fritz Rosinski set a team record of 11 interceptions in a season, which still stands.
