= 1937 Duquesne Dukes football team =

American college football season

1937 Duquesne Dukes football
- Conference: Independent
- Record: 6–4
- Head coach: Clipper Smith (2nd season)
- Home stadium: Forbes Field

1937 Eastern college football independents records
	Conf.			Overall
Team	W	L	T	W		L		T
No. 1 Pittsburgh		–		9	–	0	–	1
No. 6 Villanova		–		8	–	0	–	1
No. 3 Fordham		–		7	–	0	–	1
No. 7 Dartmouth		–		7	–	0	–	2
No. T–14 Holy Cross		–		8	–	0	–	2
St. Thomas (PA)		–		6	–	1	–	1
No. 12 Yale		–		6	–	1	–	1
Army		–		7	–	2	–	0
Boston University		–		6	–	2	–	0
Cornell		–		5	–	2	–	1
Harvard		–		5	–	2	–	1
Syracuse		–		5	–	2	–	1
CCNY		–		5	–	2	–	0
No. 12 Manhattan		–		6	–	3	–	1
Penn State		–		5	–	3	–	0
Duquesne		–		6	–	4	–	0
Brown		–		5	–	4	–	0
NYU		–		5	–	4	–	0
Temple		–		3	–	2	–	4
Boston College		–		4	–	4	–	1
Bucknell		–		3	–	3	–	2
Buffalo		–		4	–	4	–	0
Princeton		–		4	–	4	–	0
Tufts		–		3	–	4	–	1
Colgate		–		3	–	5	–	0
Columbia		–		2	–	5	–	2
Hofstra		–		2	–	4	–	0
Carnegie Tech		–		2	–	5	–	1
Penn		–		2	–	5	–	1
Providence		–		2	–	6	–	0
Vermont		–		2	–	6	–	0
La Salle		–		2	–	7	–	0
Massachusetts State		–		1	–	7	–	1
Rankings from AP Poll

The 1937 Duquesne Dukes football team, sometimes known as the Bluffites, was an American football team that represented Duquesne University as an independent during the 1937 college football season. In its second season under head coach Clipper Smith, Duquesne compiled a 6–4 record and outscored opponents by a total of 151 to 52. They were ranked No. 17 in the AP poll after winning the first two games, but dropped out of the poll after losing to cross-town rival Pittsburgh in the third game. In intersectional games, they lost to Texas Tech and Marquette and closed the season with victories over Detroit and Mississippi State.

Key players included captain and tackle Joe Maras, halfback Boyd Brumbaugh, and guard Steve Barko. No Duquesne players were included on the 1937 All-America college football team or the 1937 All-Eastern football team

The team played its home games at Forbes Field in Pittsburgh.

== Schedule ==
Date	Time	Opponent	Rank	Site	Result	Attendance	Source
September 24		Waynesburg		Forbes Field; Pittsburgh, PA	W 33–7	13,606	
October 1	8:30 p.m.	West Virginia Wesleyan		Forbes Field; Pittsburgh, PA	W 39–0	13,425	
October 9		at Pittsburgh		Pitt Stadium; Pittsburgh, PA	L 0–6	55,000	
October 15		Saint Vincent		Forbes Field; Pittsburgh, PA	W 26–0	12,264	
October 29		Richmond		Forbes Field; Pittsburgh, PA	W 24–0	5,269	
November 6		at Carnegie Tech	No. 16	Pitt Stadium; Pittsburgh, PA	L 0–6	28,000	
November 11		at Texas Tech		Tech Field; Lubbock, TX	L 0–13	12,000	
November 20		at Marquette		Marquette Stadium; Milwaukee, WI	L 6–13	7,000	
November 25		Detroit		Forbes Field; Pittsburgh, PA	W 14–7	10,800	
December 4		Mississippi State		Scott Field; Starkville, MS	W 9–0	6,000	
Rankings from AP Poll released prior to the game; All times are in Eastern time
