= Jack McDonald (American football) =

American sports coach and administrator (1908–1989)

Biographical details
- Born: March 6, 1908; Norwich, Vermont, U.S.
- Died: October 25, 1989 (aged 81); Venice, Florida, U.S.

Playing career

Football
- 1930s: NYU
- Position: Linebacker

Coaching career (HC unless noted)

Football
- 1937–1946: Hofstra

Basketball
- 1936–1943: Hofstra
- 1946–1947: Hofstra

Baseball
- 1938–1942: Hofstra

Administrative career (AD unless noted)
- 1937–1942: Hofstra
- 1945–1948: Hofstra

Head coaching record
- Overall: 21–17–1 (football); 100–56 (basketball); 30–17–1 (baseball)

John Bartlett McDonald (March 6, 1908 – October 25, 1989) was an American football, basketball, and baseball coach and college athletic administrator. Has the first head coach of Hofstra University's football and basketball teams. He compiled a 21–17–1 overall record as the football coach. MacDonald was an alumnus of New York University, class of 1933. He died in Venice, Florida in 1989. He was 81.

== Head coaching record ==
=== Football ===
Year	Team	Overall	Conference	Standing	Bowl/playoffs
Hofstra Flying Dutchmen (Independent) (1937–1946)
1937	Hofstra	2–4			
1938	Hofstra	2–3–1			
1939	Hofstra	4–2			
1940	Hofstra	4–3			
1941	Hofstra	5–2			
1942	No team—World War II				
1943	No team—World War II				
1944	No team—World War II				
1945	No team—World War II				
1946	Hofstra	4–3			
Hofstra:		21–17–1			
Total:		21–17–1			
