= 1937 Connecticut State Huskies football team =

American college football season

1937 Connecticut State Huskies football

New England Conference champion
- Conference: New England Conference
- Record: 6–2–1 (1–0 New England)
- Head coach: J. Orlean Christian (4th season)
- Home stadium: Gardner Dow Athletic Fields

1937 New England Conference football standings
	Conf.					Overall
Team	W		L		T	W		L		T
New Hampshire +	1	–	0	–	0	7	–	1	–	0
Connecticut State +	1	–	0	–	0	6	–	2	–	1
Maine	0	–	1	–	1	2	–	3	–	2
Rhode Island State	0	–	2	–	1	3	–	4	–	1
+ – Conference co-champions

The 1937 Connecticut State Huskies football team represented Connecticut State College, now the University of Connecticut, in the 1937 college football season. The Huskies were led by fourth-year head coach J. Orlean Christian and completed the season with a record of 6–2–1.

== Schedule ==
Date	Opponent	Site	Result	Source
September 25	Brown*	Gardner Dow Athletic Fields; Storrs, CT	L 0–20	
October 2	Wesleyan*	Andrus Field; Middletown, CT	L 6–17	
October 9	at Massachusetts State*	Alumni Field; Amherst, MA (rivalry)	W 36–7	
October 16	at Worcester Tech*	Worcester, MA	W 21–6	
October 23	Trinity (CT)*	Gardner Dow Athletic Fields; Storrs, CT	W 15–0	
October 30	Middlebury*	Gardner Dow Athletic Fields; Storrs, CT	W 20–7	
November 6	at Rhode Island State	Meade Stadium; Kingston, RI (rivalry)	W 13–0	
November 13	Coast Guard*	Gardner Dow Athletic Fields; Storrs, CT	T 0–0	
November 20	at Norwich*	Sabine Field; Northfield, VT	W 76–0	
*Non-conference game
