= 1937 Syracuse Orangemen football team =

American college football season

1937 Syracuse Orangemen football
- Conference: Independent
- Record: 5–2–1
- Head coach: Ossie Solem (1st season)
- Captains: Walter Rekstis; Parker Webster
- Home stadium: Archbold Stadium

1937 Eastern college football independents records
	Conf.			Overall
Team	W	L	T	W		L		T
No. 1 Pittsburgh		–		9	–	0	–	1
No. 6 Villanova		–		8	–	0	–	1
No. 3 Fordham		–		7	–	0	–	1
No. 7 Dartmouth		–		7	–	0	–	2
No. T–14 Holy Cross		–		8	–	0	–	2
St. Thomas (PA)		–		6	–	1	–	1
No. 12 Yale		–		6	–	1	–	1
Army		–		7	–	2	–	0
Boston University		–		6	–	2	–	0
Cornell		–		5	–	2	–	1
Harvard		–		5	–	2	–	1
Syracuse		–		5	–	2	–	1
CCNY		–		5	–	2	–	0
No. 12 Manhattan		–		6	–	3	–	1
Penn State		–		5	–	3	–	0
Duquesne		–		6	–	4	–	0
Brown		–		5	–	4	–	0
NYU		–		5	–	4	–	0
Temple		–		3	–	2	–	4
Boston College		–		4	–	4	–	1
Bucknell		–		3	–	3	–	2
Buffalo		–		4	–	4	–	0
Princeton		–		4	–	4	–	0
Tufts		–		3	–	4	–	1
Colgate		–		3	–	5	–	0
Columbia		–		2	–	5	–	2
Hofstra		–		2	–	4	–	0
Carnegie Tech		–		2	–	5	–	1
Penn		–		2	–	5	–	1
Providence		–		2	–	6	–	0
Vermont		–		2	–	6	–	0
La Salle		–		2	–	7	–	0
Massachusetts State		–		1	–	7	–	1
Rankings from AP Poll

The 1937 Syracuse Orangemen football team represented Syracuse University as an independent during the 1937 college football season. The Orangemen were led by first-year head coach Ossie Solem and played their home games at Archbold Stadium in Syracuse, New York. On October 18, Syracuse made its first ever appearance in the AP Poll, which was in its second year of operation. The team was ranked 17th in the first poll of the season, but dropped from the poll after a loss to Maryland.

== Schedule ==
Date	Opponent	Rank	Site	Result	Attendance	Source
October 1	Clarkson		Archbold Stadium; Syracuse, NY	W 26–6	16,000	
October 9	St. Lawrence		Archbold Stadium; Syracuse, NY	W 40–0	15,000	
October 16	at Cornell		Schoellkopf Field; Ithaca, NY	W 14–6	18,000	
October 23	vs. Maryland	No. 17	Municipal Stadium; Baltimore, MD	L 0–13	10,000	
October 30	Penn State		Archbold Stadium; Syracuse, NY (rivalry)	W 19–13	18,000	
November 6	Western Reserve		Archbold Stadium; Syracuse, NY	W 27–6	17,000	
November 13	at Columbia		Baker Field; New York, NY	T 6–6	12,000	
November 20	Colgate		Archbold Stadium; Syracuse, NY (rivalry)	L 0–7	34,000	
Rankings from AP Poll released prior to game time

== Maryland game and Wilmeth Sidat-Singh ==
Syracuse and nearby Cornell were among the first collegiate football teams to include African-American players as starting backfield players. Wilmeth Sidat-Singh, starred for Syracuse, playing a position equivalent to modern-day quarterback.

In that era, when games were played in Southern segregation states, African-American players from Northern schools were banned from the field. Because of his light complexion and name, Sidat-Singh was sometimes assumed to be a "Hindu" (as people from India were often called by Americans during this time). However. shortly before a game against the University of Maryland, a black sportswriter, Sam Lacy, wrote an article in the Baltimore Afro-American, revealing Sidat-Singh's was African-American. Maryland refused to let him play and he was held out of the game and Syracuse lost the game 0-13. In a rematch the following year at Syracuse, Sidat-Singh led the Orange to a lopsided victory (53-0) over Maryland.

On Saturday, Nov. 9, 2013, the University of Maryland publicly apologized to surviving relatives at a ceremony during a football game at Syracuse.
