= 1937 Rhode Island State Rams football team =

American college football season

1937 Rhode Island State Rams football
- Conference: New England Conference
- Record: 3–4–1 (0–2–1 New England)
- Head coach: Frank Keaney (18th season)
- Home stadium: Meade Field

1937 New England Conference football standings
	Conf.					Overall
Team	W		L		T	W		L		T
New Hampshire +	1	–	0	–	0	7	–	1	–	0
Connecticut State +	1	–	0	–	0	6	–	2	–	1
Maine	0	–	1	–	1	2	–	3	–	2
Rhode Island State	0	–	2	–	1	3	–	4	–	1
+ – Conference co-champions

The 1937 Rhode Island Rams football team was an American football team that represented Rhode Island State College (later renamed the University of Rhode Island) as a member of the New England Conference during the 1937 college football season. In its 18th season under head coach Frank Keaney, the team compiled a 3–4–1 record (0–2–1 against conference opponents) and finished at last place in the conference.

== Schedule ==
Date	Opponent	Site	Result	Attendance	Source
September 25	at Maine	Alumni Field; Orono, ME	T 0–0		
October 2	at Brown*	Providence, RI (rivalry)	L 6–13		
October 9	at Tufts*	Medford, MA	W 14–7		
October 16	Massachusetts State*	Meade Field; Kington, RI	W 12–6	2,000	
October 23	Northeastern*	Meade Field; Kingston, RI	L 6–8		
October 30	at Worcester Tech*	Worcester, MA	L 2–12		
November 6	Connecticut State^{†}	Meade Field; Kingston, RI (rivalry)	L 7–13		
November 12	at Providence*	Providence, RI	W 13–0	4,000	
*Non-conference game; ^{†}Homecoming
