= 1937 Yale Bulldogs football team =

American college football season

1937 Yale Bulldogs football
- Conference: Independent

Ranking
- AP: No. 12
- Record: 6–1–1
- Head coach: Ducky Pond (4th season)
- Captain: Clint Frank
- Home stadium: Yale Bowl

1937 Eastern college football independents records
	Conf.			Overall
Team	W	L	T	W		L		T
No. 1 Pittsburgh		–		9	–	0	–	1
No. 6 Villanova		–		8	–	0	–	1
No. 3 Fordham		–		7	–	0	–	1
No. 7 Dartmouth		–		7	–	0	–	2
No. T–14 Holy Cross		–		8	–	0	–	2
St. Thomas (PA)		–		6	–	1	–	1
No. 12 Yale		–		6	–	1	–	1
Army		–		7	–	2	–	0
Boston University		–		6	–	2	–	0
Cornell		–		5	–	2	–	1
Harvard		–		5	–	2	–	1
Syracuse		–		5	–	2	–	1
CCNY		–		5	–	2	–	0
No. 12 Manhattan		–		6	–	3	–	1
Penn State		–		5	–	3	–	0
Duquesne		–		6	–	4	–	0
Brown		–		5	–	4	–	0
NYU		–		5	–	4	–	0
Temple		–		3	–	2	–	4
Boston College		–		4	–	4	–	1
Bucknell		–		3	–	3	–	2
Buffalo		–		4	–	4	–	0
Princeton		–		4	–	4	–	0
Tufts		–		3	–	4	–	1
Colgate		–		3	–	5	–	0
Columbia		–		2	–	5	–	2
Hofstra		–		2	–	4	–	0
Carnegie Tech		–		2	–	5	–	1
Penn		–		2	–	5	–	1
Providence		–		2	–	6	–	0
Vermont		–		2	–	6	–	0
La Salle		–		2	–	7	–	0
Massachusetts State		–		1	–	7	–	1
Rankings from AP Poll

The 1937 Yale Bulldogs football team represented Yale University in the 1937 college football season. The Bulldogs were led by fourth-year head coach Ducky Pond, played their home games at the Yale Bowl and finished the season with a 6–1–1 record. Yale's captain Clint Frank would win the Heisman Trophy as the best player in college football.

== Schedule ==
Date	Opponent	Rank	Site	Result	Attendance	Source
October 2	Maine		Yale Bowl; New Haven, CT	W 26–0		
October 9	Penn		Yale Bowl; New Haven, CT	W 27–7		
October 16	Army		Yale Bowl; New Haven, CT	W 15–7		
October 23	No. 19 Cornell		Yale Bowl; New Haven, CT	W 9–0		
October 30	No. 9 Dartmouth	No. 5	Yale Bowl; New Haven, CT	T 9–9		
November 6	Brown	No. 7	Yale Bowl; New Haven, CT	W 19–0		
November 13	Princeton	No. 6	Yale Bowl; New Haven, CT (rivalry)	W 26–0		
November 20	at Harvard	No. 5	Harvard Stadium; Boston, MA (rivalry)	L 6–13	58,000	
Rankings from AP Poll released prior to the game

== NFL draft ==
The following Bulldog was selected in the National Football League draft following the season.

Round	Pick	Player	Position	NFL team
12	106	Clint Frank	B	Detroit Lions
