= 1937 Fordham Rams football team =

American college football season

1937 Fordham Rams football
- Conference: Independent

Ranking
- AP: No. 3
- Record: 7–0–1
- Head coach: Jim Crowley (5th season)
- Captain: John F. Druze
- Home stadium: Polo Grounds

1937 Eastern college football independents records
	Conf.			Overall
Team	W	L	T	W		L		T
No. 1 Pittsburgh		–		9	–	0	–	1
No. 6 Villanova		–		8	–	0	–	1
No. 3 Fordham		–		7	–	0	–	1
No. 7 Dartmouth		–		7	–	0	–	2
No. T–14 Holy Cross		–		8	–	0	–	2
St. Thomas (PA)		–		6	–	1	–	1
No. 12 Yale		–		6	–	1	–	1
Army		–		7	–	2	–	0
Boston University		–		6	–	2	–	0
Cornell		–		5	–	2	–	1
Harvard		–		5	–	2	–	1
Syracuse		–		5	–	2	–	1
CCNY		–		5	–	2	–	0
No. 12 Manhattan		–		6	–	3	–	1
Penn State		–		5	–	3	–	0
Duquesne		–		6	–	4	–	0
Brown		–		5	–	4	–	0
NYU		–		5	–	4	–	0
Temple		–		3	–	2	–	4
Boston College		–		4	–	4	–	1
Bucknell		–		3	–	3	–	2
Buffalo		–		4	–	4	–	0
Princeton		–		4	–	4	–	0
Tufts		–		3	–	4	–	1
Colgate		–		3	–	5	–	0
Columbia		–		2	–	5	–	2
Hofstra		–		2	–	4	–	0
Carnegie Tech		–		2	–	5	–	1
Penn		–		2	–	5	–	1
Providence		–		2	–	6	–	0
Vermont		–		2	–	6	–	0
La Salle		–		2	–	7	–	0
Massachusetts State		–		1	–	7	–	1
Rankings from AP Poll

The 1937 Fordham Rams football team was an American football team that represented Fordham University as an independent during the 1937 college football season. In their fifth year under head coach Jim Crowley, the Rams compiled a 7–0–1 record, outscored opponents by a total of 182 to 16, and were ranked No. 3 in the final AP Poll. They shut out five opponents, including No. 15 North Carolina, and played a scoreless tie with top-ranked Pittsburgh.

== Schedule ==
Date	Opponent	Rank	Site	Result	Attendance	Source
October 2	Franklin & Marshall		Randall's Island Stadium; New York, NY	W 66–0	8,000	
October 9	Waynesburg		Randall's Island Stadium; New York, NY	W 48–0	8,000	
October 16	Pittsburgh		Polo Grounds; New York, NY	T 0–0Ј	52,000	
October 23	TCU	No. 9	Polo Grounds; New York, NY	W 7–6	25,000	
October 30	at No. 15 North Carolina	No. 10	Kenan Memorial Stadium; Chapel Hill, NC	W 14–0	24,000	
November 6	Purdue	No. 5	Polo Grounds; New York, NY	W 21–3	40,000	
November 20	Saint Mary's	No. 4	Polo Grounds; New York, NY	W 6–0	35,000	
November 27	vs. NYU	No. 3	Yankee Stadium; Bronx, NY	W 20–7	65,000	
Rankings from AP Poll released prior to the game
