= 1937 Villanova Wildcats football team =

American college football season

1937 Villanova Wildcats football
- Conference: Independent

Ranking
- AP: No. 6
- Record: 8–0–1
- Head coach: Clipper Smith (2nd season)
- Home stadium: Shibe Park, Villanova Stadium

1937 Eastern college football independents records
	Conf.			Overall
Team	W	L	T	W		L		T
No. 1 Pittsburgh		–		9	–	0	–	1
No. 6 Villanova		–		8	–	0	–	1
No. 3 Fordham		–		7	–	0	–	1
No. 7 Dartmouth		–		7	–	0	–	2
No. T–14 Holy Cross		–		8	–	0	–	2
St. Thomas (PA)		–		6	–	1	–	1
No. 12 Yale		–		6	–	1	–	1
Army		–		7	–	2	–	0
Boston University		–		6	–	2	–	0
Cornell		–		5	–	2	–	1
Harvard		–		5	–	2	–	1
Syracuse		–		5	–	2	–	1
CCNY		–		5	–	2	–	0
No. 12 Manhattan		–		6	–	3	–	1
Penn State		–		5	–	3	–	0
Duquesne		–		6	–	4	–	0
Brown		–		5	–	4	–	0
NYU		–		5	–	4	–	0
Temple		–		3	–	2	–	4
Boston College		–		4	–	4	–	1
Bucknell		–		3	–	3	–	2
Buffalo		–		4	–	4	–	0
Princeton		–		4	–	4	–	0
Tufts		–		3	–	4	–	1
Colgate		–		3	–	5	–	0
Columbia		–		2	–	5	–	2
Hofstra		–		2	–	4	–	0
Carnegie Tech		–		2	–	5	–	1
Penn		–		2	–	5	–	1
Providence		–		2	–	6	–	0
Vermont		–		2	–	6	–	0
La Salle		–		2	–	7	–	0
Massachusetts State		–		1	–	7	–	1
Rankings from AP Poll

The 1937 Villanova Wildcats football team represented Villanova College during the 1937 college football season. The Wildcats were led by second-year head coach Clipper Smith and played their home games at Villanova Stadium in Philadelphia, Pennsylvania. Villanova ended the season undefeated with a record of 8–0–1, allowing only one score all year. They ranked 6th in the final AP Poll, the highest finish in Wildcats team history.

== Schedule ==
Date	Opponent	Rank	Site	Result	Attendance	Source
October 2	Pennsylvania Military		Villanova Stadium; Villanova, PA	W 42–0		
October 9	Auburn		Shibe Park; Philadelphia, PA	T 0–0	15,000	
October 16	at Manhattan		Ebbets Field; Brooklyn, NY	W 20–0	18,000	
October 23	Bucknell		Shibe Park; Philadelphia, PA	W 21–0	3,500	
October 30	at No. T–18 Detroit	No. 16	University of Detroit Stadium; Detroit, MI	W 7–0		
November 6	Marquette	No. 13	Shibe Park; Philadelphia, PA	W 25–7	12,000	
November 13	at Boston University	No. 9	Fenway Park; Boston, MA	W 12–0	15,000	
November 20	vs. Temple	No. 10	Temple Stadium; Philadelphia, PA	W 33–0	35,000	
November 28	at Loyola (CA)	No. 7	Los Angeles Memorial Coliseum; Los Angeles, CA	W 25–0	20,000	
Rankings from AP Poll released prior to the game
