= Joe McGee (American football) =

American football and basketball coach (1902–1958)

Biographical details
- Born: 1902
- Died: 1958 (aged 55–56); Providence, Rhode Island, U.S.

Playing career

Football
- 1921–1922: Providence
- Position: Halfback

Coaching career (HC unless noted)

Football
- 1934–1937: Providence
- 1939–1941: Providence Steamrollers
- 1942: Springfield Steamrollers

Basketball
- 1921–1922: Providence

Head coaching record
- Overall: 13–18 (college football)

Joseph P. McGee (1902–1958) was an American football and basketball coach. He is credited with instituting basketball at Providence College in Providence, Rhode Island, where he later served as head football coach, from 1934 to 1937, compiling a record of 13–18. McGee was also the head coach of the revived Providence Steamrollers of the American Association of football.

McGee later owned a garage and car rental service as the Narraganset Hotel in Providence. He died in 1958 of a heart attack.

== Head coaching record ==
=== College football ===
Year	Team	Overall	Conference	Standing	Bowl/playoffs
Providence Friars (Independent) (1934–1937)
1934	Providence	4–3			
1935	Providence	6–2			
1936	Providence	1–7			
1937	Providence	2–6			
Providence:		13–18			
Total:		13–18			
