= Cranston Stadium =

Stadium complex in Cranston, Rhode Island

Coordinates: 41.784482°N 71.445457°W

- Interactive map of Cranston Stadium
- Location: 23 Jordan Ave; Cranston, RI 02910
- Capacity: 5,000
- Surface: FieldTurf

Construction
- Opened: 1936

Tenants
- Cranston High School East (1936–present); New Bedford Whalers (NEL) (1941–1945); Providence Chiefs / Grays (NEL) (1946–1949); Rhode Island Gulls (NECBL) (1998)

Cranston Stebbins Stadium is a multi-use stadium complex located in Cranston, Rhode Island. It consists of Maggiacomo Field, a baseball field, as well as Stebbins Field, an athletic field suitable for playing football, soccer, field hockey or lacrosse.

The five-sided block is bounded by Peerless Street (northwest); Crescent Avenue (northeast); Midwood Street (east); Flint Avenue (south); and Jordan Avenue (southwest). The ballpark occupies the north portion of the complex, and the football stadium most of the south portion. There are also adjacent basketball and tennis courts.

== History ==
The stadium has traditionally hosted area high school teams for a variety of sports. However, in 1941 the New England League, a minor league baseball league that was prominent from the late 19th century to the early 20th century, attempted a comeback as a semi-professional league. Cranston Stadium played host to the Cranston team from 1941 to 1945, and the team won the league championship in 1945. In 1946 the New England League regained its status as an affiliated minor league. The Providence Chiefs played their home games at Cranston Stadium from 1946 to 1947 and then again as the Providence Grays in 1948. The team returned for the 1949 season, but shut down halfway through the season. The '49 season would be the last for the New England League and was the last season of professional baseball played at the stadium.

In 1998, Cranston Stadium was chosen to host the Rhode Island Gulls expansion team. However, with small crowds, the team lasted only two seasons in Cranston before moving to Newport, Rhode Island, and being renamed the Newport Gulls, although the Rhode Island Gulls did play for the 2000 NECBL Championship in Cranston, falling to Keene.

== Improvements and present day ==
The city of Cranston has kept the baseball field in good playing shape and it has continued to host various forms of amateur baseball including, high schools, American Legion and wooden bat tournaments. In 2007, the City of Cranston had field turf installed on the football portion of the stadium facility at a cost of $839,000. The city has been able to add field hockey and soccer to the stadium and reports show that the field is now making about $250,000 to $300,000 per year in rental fees.
