= 1937 college football rankings =

- Season: 1937
- Bowl season: 1937–38 bowl games
- End of season champions: Pittsburgh (Note: per AP poll, Boand System, Dickinson System, Houlgate System, Litkenhous Ratings, Poling System, Williamson System, Berryman QPRS, Billingsley Report, College Football Researchers Association, National Championship Foundation, Sagarin Ratings Elo chess method, Sagarin Ratings Predictor method); California (Note: per Dunkel System and Helms Athletic Foundation)

The following polls and rankings composed the 1937 college football rankings. Unlike most sports, college football's governing body, the NCAA, does not bestow a national championship, instead that title is bestowed by one or more different selectors.

== Champions (by ranking) ==
Most major rankings (both contemporary and retroactive) have found Pittsburgh to have been the 1937 national champion. However, two major rankings (the contemporary Dunkel and retroactive Helms rankings) instead find California to have been the champion.

- AP poll: Pittsburgh
- Berryman QPRS: Pittsburgh
- Billingsley Report: Pittsburgh
- Boand System: Pittsburgh
- College Football Researchers Association: Pittsburgh
- Dickinson System: Pittsburgh
- Dunkel System: California
- Helms Athletic Foundation: California
- Houlgate System: Pittsburgh
- Litkenhous Ratings: Pittsburgh
- National Championship Foundation: Pittsburgh
- Poling System: Pittsburgh
- Sagarin Ratings Elo chess method: Pittsburgh
- Sagarin Ratings Predictor method: Pittsburgh
- Williamson System: Pittsburgh

Note: AP poll, Boand System, Dickinson System, Dunkel System, Houlgate System, Litkenhous Ratings, Poling System, and Williamson System were given contemporarily. All other methods were given retroactively.

== AP Poll ==
=== Legend ===
| | Increase in ranking |
| | Decrease in ranking |
| | Not ranked previous week |
| | National champion |
| (#–#) | Win–loss record |
| (Italics) | Number of first place votes |
| т | Tied with team above or below also with this symbol |

The final AP Poll was released on November 29, at the end of the 1937 regular season, weeks before the major bowls. The AP would not release a post-bowl season final poll regularly until 1968.

| | Week 1 Oct 18 | Week 2 Oct 25 | Week 3 Nov 1 | Week 4 Nov 8 | Week 5 Nov 15 | Week 6 Nov 22 | Week 7 (Final) Nov 29 | |
|---|---|---|---|---|---|---|---|---|
| 1. | California (5–0) (24) | California (6–0) (48) | California (7–0) (49) | Pittsburgh (6–0–1) (32) | Pittsburgh (7–0–1) (49) | Pittsburgh (8–0–1) (38) | Pittsburgh (9–0–1) (30) | 1. |
| 2. | Alabama (4–0) (7) | Pittsburgh (4–0–1) (3) | Alabama (6–0) (6) | California (7–0–1) (9) | California (8–0–1) (6) | California (9–0–1) (10) | California (9–0–1) | 2. |
| 3. | Pittsburgh (3–0–1) (8) | Alabama (5–0) | Pittsburgh (5–0–1) (4) | Alabama (7–0) (13) | Alabama (8–0) (2) | Fordham (6–0–1) | Fordham (7–0–1) (2) | 3. |
| 4. | Minnesota (3–1) (5) | Minnesota (3–1) (2) | Baylor (6–0) (2) | Fordham (5–0–1) (2) | Fordham (5–0–1) (2) | Alabama (8–0) | Alabama (9–0) (1) | 4. |
| 5. | Yale (3–0) (6) | Yale (4–0) (2) | Fordham (4–0–1) | Dartmouth (6–0–1) | Yale (6–0–1) | Minnesota (6–2) | Minnesota (6–2) | 5. |
| 6. | LSU (4–0) (2) | Baylor (5–0) (1) | Nebraska (4–0–1) | Yale (5–0–1) | Santa Clara (7–0) | Dartmouth (7–0–2) | Villanova (8–0–1) | 6. |
| 7. | Northwestern (3–0) | Vanderbilt (5–0) (1) | Yale (4–0–1) | Santa Clara (6–0) | Minnesota (5–2) | Villanova (7–0–1) | Dartmouth (7–0–2) | 7. |
| 8. | Nebraska (2–0–1) | Ohio State (3–1) | Ohio State (4–1) | Duke (6–0–1) | LSU (7–1) | Santa Clara (7–0) | LSU (9–1) | 8. |
| 9. | Fordham (2–0–1) | Dartmouth (5–0) | Dartmouth (5–0–1) | Villanova (5–0–1) | Dartmouth (6–0–2) | Notre Dame (5–2–1) | Notre Dame (6–2–1) т | 9. |
| 10. | Duke (3–0–1) | Fordham (3–0–1) | Santa Clara (5–0) | Minnesota (4–2) | Villanova (6–0–1) | LSU (8–1) | Santa Clara (8–0) т | 10. |
| 11. | USC (3–1) | Nebraska (3–0–1) | Duke (5–0–1) | Nebraska (4–0–2) | Nebraska (4–1–2) | Nebraska (5–1–2) | Nebraska (6–1–2) | 11. |
| 12. | Ohio State (2–1) | Auburn (3–0–2) | Notre Dame (3–1–1) | LSU (6–1) | Notre Dame (4–2–1) | Vanderbilt (7–1) | Yale (6–1–1) | 12. |
| 13. | Texas A&M (2–0–1) | Duke (4–0–1) | Villanova (4–0–1) | Baylor (6–1) | Stanford (4–2–1) | Washington (5–2–2) | Ohio State (6–2) | 13. |
| 14. | Santa Clara (3–0) | Santa Clara (4–0) | Minnesota (3–2) | Auburn (4–1–2) | Holy Cross (7–0–1) | TCU (3–4–2) т | Arkansas (6–2–2) т | 14. |
| 15. | Baylor (4–0) | North Carolina (4–0–1) | Tennessee (4–1–1) | Rice (3–2–1) | Rice (3–2–2) | Yale (6–1–1) т | Holy Cross (8–0–2) т | 15. |
| 16. | Wisconsin (4–0) | Villanova (3–0–1) | Arkansas (4–1–1) т | Colorado (6–0) | Colorado (7–0) | Colorado (8–0) | TCU (4–4–2) | 16. |
| 17. | Syracuse (3–0) | LSU (4–1) | Duquesne (4–1) т | Indiana (4–2) | North Carolina (6–1–1) | Holy Cross (7–0–2) | Colorado (8–0) | 17. |
| 18. | Dartmouth (4–0) | Detroit (5–0) т | LSU (5–1) | Notre Dame (3–2–1) | Vanderbilt (7–1) | Duke (7–1–1) т | Rice (4–3–2) | 18. |
| 19. | Cornell (3–1) | Holy Cross (5–0) т | Northwestern (4–1) т | Holy Cross (6–0–1) | Ohio State (5–2) | North Carolina (6–1–1) т | North Carolina (7–1–1) | 19. |
| 20. | Auburn (2–0–2) т; Holy Cross (4–0) т; Vanderbilt (4–0) т | Arkansas (3–1–1) | Tulane (4–1–1) т | Arkansas (4–2–1) | Indiana (5–2) | Tulsa (6–1–1) | Duke (7–2–1) | 20. |
| | Week 1 Oct 18 | Week 2 Oct 25 | Week 3 Nov 1 | Week 4 Nov 8 | Week 5 Nov 15 | Week 6 Nov 22 | Week 7 (Final) Nov 29 | |
| | | Dropped: Cornell; Northwestern; Syracuse; Texas A&M; USC; Wisconsin | Dropped: Auburn; Detroit; Holy Cross; North Carolina; Vanderbilt | Dropped: Duquesne; Northwestern; Ohio State; Tennessee; Tulane | Dropped: Arkansas; Auburn; Baylor; Duke | Dropped: Indiana; Ohio State; Rice; Stanford | Dropped: Tulsa; Vanderbilt; Washington | |

== Boand System rankings ==
The final post-bowl Boand System rankings for 1937 were:

1. Pittsburgh (83.6 pts)
2. California (82.4 pts)
3. Fordham (79.3 pts)
4. Santa Clara (78.7 pts)
5. Villanova (77.4 pts)
6. Dartmouth (76.9 pts)
7. Yale (76.2 pts)
8. Alabama (75.4 pts)
9. Nebraska (75.3 pts)
10. Louisiana State (75.1 pts)
11. Holy Cross (75.0 pts)
12. Notre Dame (74.1 pts)
13. Minnesota (73.7 pts)
14. Auburn (73.5 pts)
15. Michigan State (73.4 pts)
16. Ohio State (73.3 pts)
17. Rice (71.9 pts)
18. North Carolina (71.6 pts)
19. Vanderbilt (70.7 pts)
20. Army (70.6 pts)

== Litkenhous Ratings ==
The top 26 teams in the Litkenhous Ratings for 1937 were as follows:

1. Pittsburgh (9–0–1) - 98.8
2. Alabama (9–1) - 95.6
3. Fordham (7–0–1) - 93.5
4. LSU (9–2) - 92.5
5. Minnesota (6–2) - 86.7
6. Dartmouth (7–0–2) - 86.6
7. Auburn (6–2–3) - 85.7
8. Duke (7–2–1) - 84.8
9. Villanova (8–0–1) - 84.8
10. Ohio State (6–2) - 84.7
11. California (10–0–1) - 84.6
12. Arkansas (6–2–2) - 83.8
13. Tennessee (6–3–1) - 83.4
14. Santa Clara (9–0) - 82.3
15. Georgia Tech (6–3–1) - 82.2
16. Vanderbilt (7–2) - 81.8
17. North Carolina (7–1–1) - 81.8
18. Detroit (7–3) - 81.8
19. Tulane (5–4–1) - 81.5
20. Rice (6–3–2) - 81.4
21. Harvard (5–2–1) - 80.6
22. Notre Dame (6–2–1) - 80.4
23. Tulsa (6–2–2) - 80.4
24. TCU (4–4–2) - 80.1
25. Baylor (7–3) - 79.5
26. Yale (6–1–1) - 79.3

== See also ==
- 1937 College Football All-America Team
