= 1937 Fresno State Bulldogs football team =

American college football season

1937 Fresno State Bulldogs football

FWC champion

Charity Bowl, W 27–26 vs. Arkansas State Teachers
- Conference: Far Western Conference
- Record: 8–1–1 (4–0 FWC)
- Head coach: James Bradshaw (2nd season)
- Home stadium: Fresno State College Stadium

1937 Far Western Conference football standings
	Conf.					Overall
Team	W		L		T	W		L		T
Fresno State $	4	–	0	–	0	8	–	1	–	1
Pacific (CA)	3	–	1	–	0	3	–	5	–	2
Cal Aggies	2	–	2	–	0	4	–	4	–	0
Nevada	1	–	3	–	0	2	–	6	–	0
Chico State	0	–	4	–	0	0	–	6	–	1
$ – Conference champion

The 1937 Fresno State Bulldogs football team represented Fresno State Normal School—now known as California State University, Fresno—during the 1937 college football season.

Fresno State competed in the Far Western Conference (FWC). (Note: The Northern California Athletic Conference (NCAC) was known as the Far Western Conference (FWC) from its founding in 1925 to 1982.) The 1937 team was led by second-year head coach James Bradshaw and played home games at Fresno State College Stadium (Note: Ratcliffe Stadium was known as Fresno State College Stadium from 1926 to 1940.) on the campus of Fresno City College in Fresno, California. They finished the season as champion of the FWC with a regular season record of seven wins, one loss and one tie (7–1–1, 4–0 FWC). The Bulldogs outscored their opponents 223–75 for the season. That included holding opponents under 10 points seven times, with four shutouts. At the end of the season, the Bulldogs were invited to play in their first postseason bowl game, the Christmas Day Charity Bowl game against Arkansas State Teachers played in Los Angeles. Fresno State won the game, 27–26, giving them a final record of eight wins, one loss and one tie (8–1–1).

== Schedule ==
Date	Opponent	Site	Result	Attendance	Source
September 25	USC JV*	Fresno State College Stadium; Fresno, CA	T 13–13	5,123	
October 1	at Willamette*	Sweetland Field; Salem, OR	W 7–0	3,200	
October 9	California JV*	Fresno State College Stadium; Fresno, CA	W 20–7	6,576	
October 15	at Whittier*	Hadley Field; Whittier, CA	W 24–0	2,500	
October 22	at Cal Aggies	Woodland, CA	W 19–0	3,500	
October 30	Chico State	Fresno State College Stadium; Fresno, CA	W 40–7	3,082	
November 6	at Nevada	Mackay Stadium (Note: This stadium is the predecessor to the current Mackay Stadium, which was opened for the 1966 season.); Reno, NV	W 46–8	3,500	
November 11	Hardin–Simmons*	Fresno State College Stadium; Fresno, CA	L 7–14	11,371	
November 25	Pacific (CA)	Fresno State College Stadium; Fresno, CA	W 20–0	10,053	
December 25	Arkansas State Teachers*	Gilmore Stadium; Los Angeles, CA (Charity Bowl (Note: The 2016 Fresno State Media Guide calls this game the "Little All-American Bowl", but there is no reference to that name in the various 1937 newspaper accounts of the game.))	W 27–26	5,000	
*Non-conference game
