= 1937 Stanford Indians football team =

American college football season

1937 Stanford Indians football
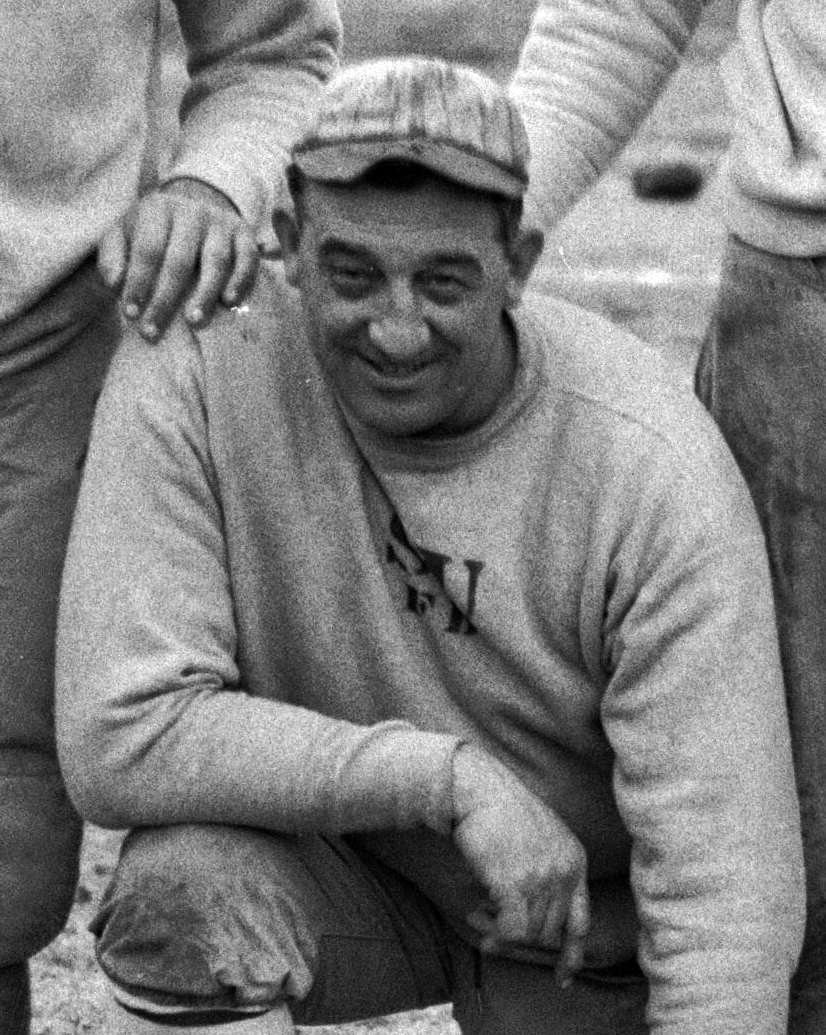
- Head coach Tiny Thornhill
- Conference: Pacific Coast Conference
- Record: 4–3–2 (4–2–1 PCC)
- Head coach: Tiny Thornhill (5th season)
- Home stadium: Stanford Stadium

1937 Pacific Coast Conference football standings
	Conf.					Overall
Team	W		L		T	W		L		T
No. 2 California $	6	–	0	–	1	10	–	0	–	1
Stanford	4	–	2	–	1	4	–	3	–	2
Washington	4	–	2	–	2	7	–	2	–	2
Washington State	3	–	3	–	2	3	–	3	–	3
Idaho	2	–	2	–	0	4	–	3	–	1
Oregon State	2	–	3	–	3	3	–	3	–	3
USC	2	–	3	–	2	4	–	4	–	2
Oregon	2	–	5	–	0	4	–	6	–	0
UCLA	1	–	5	–	1	2	–	6	–	1
Montana	0	–	1	–	0	7	–	1	–	0
$ – Conference champion; Rankings from AP Poll

The 1937 Stanford Indians football team represented Stanford University as a member of the Pacific Coast Conference (PCC) during the 1937 college football season. Led by fifth-year head coach Tiny Thornhill, the Indians compiled an overall record of 4–3–2 with a mark of 4–2–1 in conference play, placing second in the PCC. The team played home games at Stanford Stadium in Stanford, California.

Stanford had been scheduled to play two games in Hawaii—against a Honolulu town team and the Hawaii Rainbows—in December, but the games were canceled due to steamship schedule changes that meant the team would miss a week and a half of classes in winter quarter. Washington replaced Stanford for both games.

== Schedule ==
Date	Opponent	Rank	Site	Result	Attendance	Source
September 25	Santa Clara*		Stanford Stadium; Stanford, CA	L 7–13	35,000	
October 2	at Oregon		Hayward Field; Eugene, OR	L 6–7	7,500	
October 9	UCLA		Stanford Stadium; Stanford, CA	W 12–7	15,000	
October 23	at Washington		Husky Stadium; Seattle, WA	W 13–7	22,000	
October 30	Oregon State		Stanford Stadium; Stanford, CA	T 0–0	20,000	
November 6	at USC		Los Angeles Memorial Coliseum; Los Angeles, CA (rivalry)	W 7–6	55,000	
November 13	Washington State		Stanford Stadium; Stanford, CA	W 23–0	20,000	
November 20	No. 2 California	No. 13	Stanford Stadium; Stanford, CA (Big Game)	L 0–13	85,000	
November 27	at Columbia*		Baker Field; New York, NY	T 0–0	20,000	
*Non-conference game; Rankings from AP Poll released prior to the game; Source:

== Game summaries ==
=== California ===
The Indians were 4–1–1 in the Pacific Coast Conference entering the Big Game against 5–0–1 California. A head-to-head win over the Bears would almost certainly have given Stanford a bid to the 1938 Rose Bowl. However, the Bears scored two touchdowns in quick succession in an eight-minute stretch of the second quarter and held the Indians scoreless, winning 13–0.

=== Columbia ===
Stanford faced Columbia for the third time in four years. The Indians had lost to the Lions in the 1934 Rose Bowl and lost in New York the previous season; this year, in what would be the final meeting of the teams, the teams played to a scoreless tie.
