= 1937 Washington State Cougars football team =

American college football season

1937 Washington State Cougars football
- Conference: Pacific Coast Conference
- Record: 3–3–3 (3–3–2 PCC)
- Head coach: Babe Hollingbery (12th season)
- Captain: Chris Rumburg
- Home stadium: Rogers Field

1937 Pacific Coast Conference football standings
	Conf.					Overall
Team	W		L		T	W		L		T
No. 2 California $	6	–	0	–	1	10	–	0	–	1
Stanford	4	–	2	–	1	4	–	3	–	2
Washington	4	–	2	–	2	7	–	2	–	2
Washington State	3	–	3	–	2	3	–	3	–	3
Idaho	2	–	2	–	0	4	–	3	–	1
Oregon State	2	–	3	–	3	3	–	3	–	3
USC	2	–	3	–	2	4	–	4	–	2
Oregon	2	–	5	–	0	4	–	6	–	0
UCLA	1	–	5	–	1	2	–	6	–	1
Montana	0	–	1	–	0	7	–	1	–	0
$ – Conference champion; Rankings from AP Poll

The 1937 Washington State Cougars football team was an American football team that represented Washington State College in the Pacific Coast Conference (PCC) during the 1937 college football season. Twelfth-year head coach Babe Hollingbery led the team to a 3–3–2 mark in the PCC and 3–3–3 overall.

The Cougars' four home games were played on campus at Rogers Field in Pullman.

== Schedule ==
Date	Opponent	Site	Result	Attendance	Source
September 25	at Gonzaga*	Gonzaga Stadium; Spokane, WA	T 0–0	14,000	
October 2	Idaho	Rogers Field; Pullman, WA (rivalry)	W 13–0	13,500	
October 9	at California	California Memorial Stadium; Berkeley, CA	L 0–27	40,000	
October 16	Washington	Rogers Field; Pullman, WA (rivalry)	T 7–7	17,000	
October 23	at UCLA	Los Angeles Memorial Coliseum; Los Angeles, CA	W 3–0	20,000	
October 30	USC	Rogers Field; Pullman, WA	T 0–0	8,700	
November 6	at Oregon	Multnomah Stadium; Portland, OR	L 6–10	13,362	
November 13	at Stanford	Stanford Stadium; Stanford, CA	L 0–23	20,000	
November 20	at Oregon State	Bell Field; Corvallis, OR	W 7–0	12,000	
*Non-conference game; Source:
