= 1937 Texas Tech Red Raiders football team =

American college football season

1937 Texas Tech Red Raiders football

Border champion

Sun Bowl, L 6–7 vs. West Virginia
- Conference: Border Conference
- Record: 8–4 (3–0 Border)
- Head coach: Pete Cawthon (8th season)
- Offensive scheme: Single-wing
- Base defense: 6–2
- Captains: Lewis Jones; Red Ramsey
- Home stadium: Tech Field

1937 Border Conference football standings
	Conf.					Overall
Team	W		L		T	W		L		T
Texas Tech $	3	–	0	–	0	8	–	4	–	0
New Mexico A&M	4	–	1	–	0	7	–	2	–	0
Arizona	3	–	1	–	0	8	–	2	–	0
Texas Mines	2	–	1	–	1	7	–	1	–	2
New Mexico	2	–	3	–	1	4	–	4	–	1
Arizona State–Flagstaff	1	–	4	–	0	5	–	5	–	0
Arizona State	0	–	5	–	0	0	–	8	–	1
$ – Conference champion

The 1937 Texas Tech Red Raiders football team represented Texas Technological College—now known as Texas Tech University—as a member of the Border Conference during the 1937 college football season. Led by eighth-year head coach Pete Cawthon, the Red Raiders compiled an overall record of 8–4 with a mark of 3–0 in conference play, winning the Border Conference title. Texas Tech was invited to the Sun Bowl, where they lost to West Virginia. The team played home games at Tech Field in Lubbock, Texas.

== Schedule ==
Date	Opponent	Site	Result	Attendance	Source
September 18	Arizona State–Flagstaff	Tech Field; Lubbock, TX	W 6–0	4,200	
September 25	at Texas*	War Memorial Stadium; Austin, TX (rivalry)	L 12–25	10,000	
October 2	Montana*	Tech Field; Lubbock, TX	L 6–13	8,000	
October 9	at Detroit*	University of Detroit Stadium; Detroit, MI	L 0–34	11,000	
October 16	Arizona	Tech Field; Lubbock, TX	W 20–0	4,500	
October 23	New Mexico	Tech Field; Lubbock, TX	W 27–0	7,500	
October 30	at Oklahoma A&M*	Lewis Field; Stillwater, OK	W 14–6	6,000	
November 5	at Loyola (LA)*	Loyola University Stadium; New Orleans, LA	W 25–6	5,000	
November 11	Duquesne*^{†}	Tech Field; Lubbock, TX	W 13–0	12,000	
November 20	at Centenary*	State Fair Stadium; Shreveport, LA	W 7–2	7,000	
November 25	Creighton*	Tech Field; Lubbock, TX	W 27–0	7,000	
January 1	vs. West Virginia*	Kidd Field; El Paso, TX (Sun Bowl)	L 6–7	12,000	
*Non-conference game; ^{†}Homecoming
