= 1937 Colorado A&M Aggies football team =

American college football season

1937 Colorado A&M Aggies football
- Conference: Rocky Mountain Conference
- Record: 1–7 (1–6 RMC)
- Head coach: Harry W. Hughes (27th season)
- Home stadium: Colorado Field

1937 Rocky Mountain Conference football standings
| | Conf. | | | | | Overall |
| Team | W | | L | | T | W | | L | | T |
|---|---|---|---|---|---|---|---|---|---|---|
| No. 17 Colorado $ | 7 | – | 0 | – | 0 | 8 | – | 1 | – | 0 |
| Western State (CO) | 3 | – | 1 | – | 0 | 5 | – | 3 | – | 0 |
| BYU | 5 | – | 2 | – | 0 | 6 | – | 3 | – | 0 |
| Denver | 5 | – | 2 | – | 0 | 6 | – | 3 | – | 0 |
| Utah | 5 | – | 2 | – | 0 | 5 | – | 3 | – | 0 |
| Colorado College | 3 | – | 3 | – | 0 | 5 | – | 4 | – | 0 |
| Utah State | 2 | – | 4 | – | 1 | 2 | – | 4 | – | 2 |
| Wyoming | 2 | – | 4 | – | 0 | 3 | – | 5 | – | 0 |
| Colorado State–Greeley | 2 | – | 4 | – | 0 | 2 | – | 6 | – | 0 |
| Colorado Mines | 1 | – | 5 | – | 0 | 2 | – | 5 | – | 0 |
| Colorado A&M | 1 | – | 6 | – | 0 | 1 | – | 7 | – | 0 |
| Montana State | 0 | – | 3 | – | 1 | 3 | – | 4 | – | 1 |
$ – Conference champion; Rankings from AP poll

The 1937 Colorado A&M Aggies football team was an American football team that represented Colorado A&M (now known as Colorado State University) in the Rocky Mountain Conference (RMC) during the 1937 college football season. In their 27th season under head coach Harry W. Hughes, the Aggies compiled a 1–7 record (1–6 against RMC opponents), finished 11th in the RMC, and were outscored by a total of 182 to 6.

== Schedule ==
| Date | Opponent | Site | Result | Attendance | Source |
|---|---|---|---|---|---|
| October 2 | Colorado Mines | Colorado Field; Fort Collins, CO | L 0–7 | | |
| October 9 | at Denver | Denver University Stadium; Denver, CO | L 0–22 | 10,023 | |
| October 16 | Wyoming | Colorado Field; Fort Collins, CO (rivalry) | L 0–7 | 3,200 | |
| October 23 | at Colorado | Colorado Stadium; Boulder, CO (rivalry) | L 0–47 | | |
| October 30 | at Utah State | Aggie Stadium; Logan, UT | L 0–7 | | |
| November 13 | Utah^{†} | Colorado Field; Fort Collins, CO | L 0–45 | | |
| November 20 | at Colorado College | Washburn Field; Colorado Springs, CO | W 6–0 | | |
| November 25 | at Arizona* | Arizona Stadium; Tucson, AZ | L 0–47 | 7,500 | |
*Non-conference game; ^{†}Homecoming
