= 1937 Wyoming Cowboys football team =

American college football season

1937 Wyoming Cowboys football
- Conference: Rocky Mountain Conference
- Record: 3–5 (2–4 RMC)
- Head coach: Willard Witte (5th season)
- Captain: None
- Home stadium: Corbett Field

1937 Rocky Mountain Conference football standings
	Conf.					Overall
Team	W		L		T	W		L		T
No. 17 Colorado $	7	–	0	–	0	8	–	1	–	0
Western State (CO)	3	–	1	–	0	5	–	3	–	0
BYU	5	–	2	–	0	6	–	3	–	0
Denver	5	–	2	–	0	6	–	3	–	0
Utah	5	–	2	–	0	5	–	3	–	0
Colorado College	3	–	3	–	0	5	–	4	–	0
Utah State	2	–	4	–	1	2	–	4	–	2
Wyoming	2	–	4	–	0	3	–	5	–	0
Colorado State–Greeley	2	–	4	–	0	2	–	6	–	0
Colorado Mines	1	–	5	–	0	2	–	5	–	0
Colorado A&M	1	–	6	–	0	1	–	7	–	0
Montana State	0	–	3	–	1	3	–	4	–	1
$ – Conference champion; Rankings from AP poll

The 1937 Wyoming Cowboys football team represented the University of Wyoming in the Rocky Mountain Conference (RMC) during the 1937 college football season. In its fourth season under head coach Willard Witte, the team compiled a 3–5 record (2–4 against RMC opponents), tied for seventh in the conference, and were outscored by a total of 92 to 86.

== Schedule ==
Date	Opponent	Site	Result	Attendance	Source
September 25	at Fort Warren	Cheyenne, WY	W 20–0		
October 2	at Nevada	Mackay Field; Reno, NV	L 7–9		
October 9	at Colorado College	Washburn Field; Colorado Springs, CO	L 6–9		
October 16	at Colorado A&M	Colorado Field; Fort Collins, CO (rivalry)	W 7–0	3,200	
October 23	at Utah State	Aggie Stadium; Logan, UT (rivalry)	L 7–34		
November 6	BYU	Corbett Field; Laramie, WY	L 0–19	4,500	
November 13	at Denver	Denver University Stadium; Denver, CO	L 6–21		
November 25	Colorado State–Greeley	Corbett Field; Laramie, WY	W 33–0		
