= 1937 San Jose State Spartans football team =

American college football season

1937 San Jose State Spartans football
- Conference: Independent
- Record: 11–2–1
- Head coach: Dudley DeGroot (6th season)
- Home stadium: Spartan Stadium

1937 Western college football independents records
	Conf.			Overall
Team	W	L	T	W		L		T
No. T–9 Santa Clara		–		9	–	0	–	0
San Jose State		–		11	–	2	–	1
Pomona		–		6	–	2	–	1
Humboldt State		–		4	–	2	–	0
Idaho Southern Branch		–		6	–	3	–	0
Cal Poly		–		4	–	2	–	2
Portland		–		4	–	3	–	1
Saint Mary's		–		4	–	3	–	2
San Francisco		–		4	–	5	–	1
Loyola (CA)		–		4	–	7	–	0
Gonzaga		–		2	–	6	–	2
Hawaii		–		2	–	6	–	0
San Francisco State		–		1	–	6	–	1
Rankings from AP Poll

The 1937 San Jose State Spartans football team represented San Jose State College. (Note: San Jose State University was known as San Jose State College from 1935 to 1971.) The Spartans were led by sixth-year head coach Dudley DeGroot and played home games at Spartan Stadium. The team played as an Independent and finished with a record of eleven wins, two losses, and one tie (11–2–1).

== Schedule ==
Date	Opponent	Site	Result	Attendance	Source
September 20	College of Idaho	Spartan Stadium; San Jose, CA	W 59–0		
September 25	La Verne	Spartan Stadium; San Jose, CA	W 40–0		
October 1	at Pacific (CA)	Baxter Stadium; Stockton, CA (rivalry)	W 12–7		
October 8	Arizona State–Flagstaff	Spartan Stadium; San Jose, CA	W 21–6	9,500	
October 15	Willamette	Spartan Stadium; San Jose, CA	W 31–7		
October 22	Caltech	Spartan Stadium; San Jose, CA	W 48–6		
October 30	at San Diego Marines (Note: The Marine Corps Recruit Depot (MCRD) in San Diego fielded a team that played against colleges and other military teams from 1922 to 1964.)	Beeson Field; San Diego, CA	T 7–7		
November 7	Santa Clara	Spartan Stadium; San Jose, CA	L 2–25		
November 11	Redlands	Spartan Stadium; San Jose, CA	W 12–0		
November 13	at Humboldt State	Albee Stadium; Eureka, CA	W 13–2		
November 20	at Arizona State	Goodwin Stadium; Tempe, AZ	W 25–6		
November 25	at San Diego State	Spartan Stadium; San Jose, CA	L 6–7	8,000	
December 4	at Hawaii	Honolulu Stadium; Honolulu, Territory of Hawaii (rivalry)	W 7–6	18,500	
December 11	at Honolulu town team	Honolulu Stadium; Honolulu, Territory of Hawaii	W 13–0		
