= 1937 Nevada Wolf Pack football team =

American college football season

1937 Nevada Wolf Pack football
- Conference: Far Western Conference
- Record: 2–6 (1–3 FWC)
- Head coach: Doug Dashiell (2nd season)
- Home stadium: Mackay Field

1937 Far Western Conference football standings
	Conf.					Overall
Team	W		L		T	W		L		T
Fresno State $	4	–	0	–	0	8	–	1	–	1
Pacific (CA)	3	–	1	–	0	3	–	5	–	2
Cal Aggies	2	–	2	–	0	4	–	4	–	0
Nevada	1	–	3	–	0	2	–	6	–	0
Chico State	0	–	4	–	0	0	–	6	–	1
$ – Conference champion

The 1937 Nevada Wolf Pack football team was an American football team that represented the University of Nevada in the Far Western Conference (FWC) during the 1937 college football season. In their second season under head coach Doug Dashiell, the team compiled a 2–6 record (1–3 against conference opponents) and finished fourth in the conference.

== Schedule ==
Date	Opponent	Site	Result	Attendance	Source
October 2	Wyoming*	Mackay Field; Reno, NV	W 9–7		
October 9	at Saint Mary's*	Kezar Stadium; San Francisco, CA	L 0–42	< 2,000	
October 16	at Chico State	College Field; Chico, CA	W 27–0		
October 23	Pacific (CA)^{†}	Mackay Field; Reno, NV	L 3–7		
October 30	Cal Aggies	Mackay Field; Reno, NV	L 0–12		
November 6	Fresno State	Mackay Field; Reno, NV	L 8–46	3,500	
November 13	at Santa Barbara State*	Peabody Stadium; Santa Barbara, CA	L 7–20		
November 25	Willamette*	Mackay Field; Reno, NV	L 7–41		
*Non-conference game; ^{†}Homecoming
