= 1938 Sun Bowl =

American college football game

West Virginia Mountaineers	Texas Tech Red Raiders
(7–1–1)	(8–3)
Independent	Border Conference
7	6
Head coach: Marshall Glenn	Head coach: Pete Cawthon
	1	2	3	4	Total
West Virginia	0	7	0	0	7
Texas Tech	0	6	0	0	6
- Date: January 1, 1938
- Season: 1937
- Stadium: Kidd Field
- Location: El Paso, Texas
- Referee: Cooper Kinney
- Attendance: 12,000

The 1938 Sun Bowl was a college football postseason bowl game between the Texas Tech Red Raiders and the West Virginia Mountaineers. This was the first Sun Bowl played at Kidd Field.

== Background ==
The Red Raiders were champion of the Border Intercollegiate Athletic Association for the first time in school history, which earned them the right to be invited to their first ever bowl game. The Mountaineers' only loss in the season was to Pittsburgh (the eventual champion). This was the first Sun Bowl played at Kidd Field.

== Game summary ==
A fumble by the Red Raiders on their own five yard line was recovered by the Mountaineers at the three. But West Virginia was stopped three times as fourth down approached. However, David Issac picked up his own fumbled while avoiding three tackles and dashed into the end zone, giving them a 7–0 lead. Before the half ended, Tech went on a drive. Led by quarterback Ed Smith, the Red Raiders drove 80 yards, culminating on a Charlie Calhoun one-yard rush for a touchdown. But the extra point was blocked, leaving the game at 7–6. As it turned out, Emmett Moan's extra point kick for West Virginia proved to be the winning margin. A 92-yard touchdown run by WVU's Harry Clarke (who ran for 132 yards) was called back for holding. Texas Tech had more yards, completed passes and first downs than the Mountaineers, but their two turnovers cost them dearly.

== Statistics ==
Statistics	Texas Tech	West Virginia
First downs	14	9
Rushing yards	175	185
Passing yards	74	0
Total offense	249	185
Passing	7–21–0	0–7–0
Fumbles–lost	3–2	1–0
Penalties–yards	6–57	9–90
Punts–average	5–34.8	8–32.0

== Aftermath ==
The Mountaineers waited 11 years for their next bowl game, which turned out to be the Sun Bowl. The Red Raiders have played in the Sun Bowl eight more time since this game, though they've only won once.
