= Charity Bowl =

1937 collegiate American football bowl game

The Charity Bowl was a one-time postseason college football bowl game held on December 25, 1937, in Los Angeles, California. The game featured Fresno State and Central Arkansas. Fresno State won, 27–26.

== Game result ==
Date	Year	Stadium	City	Winner		Loser	
December 25	1937	Gilmore Stadium	Los Angeles, California	Fresno State	27	Central Arkansas	26
