= 1937 San Francisco State Staters football team =

American college football season

1937 San Francisco State Staters football
- Conference: Independent
- Record: 1–6–1
- Head coach: Dan Farmer & Hal Hardin (3rd season)
- Home stadium: Roberts Field

1937 Western college football independents records
	Conf.			Overall
Team	W	L	T	W		L		T
No. T–9 Santa Clara		–		9	–	0	–	0
San Jose State		–		11	–	2	–	1
Pomona		–		6	–	2	–	1
Humboldt State		–		4	–	2	–	0
Idaho Southern Branch		–		6	–	3	–	0
Cal Poly		–		4	–	2	–	2
Portland		–		4	–	3	–	1
Saint Mary's		–		4	–	3	–	2
San Francisco		–		4	–	5	–	1
Loyola (CA)		–		4	–	7	–	0
Gonzaga		–		2	–	6	–	2
Hawaii		–		2	–	6	–	0
San Francisco State		–		1	–	6	–	1
Rankings from AP Poll

The 1937 San Francisco State States football team represented San Francisco State College—now known as San Francisco State University—as an independent during the 1937 college football season. Led by third-year co-head coaches Dan Farmer and Hal Hardin, San Francisco State compiled a record of 1–6–1 and was outscored by its opponents 142 to 49. The team played home games at Roberts Field in San Francisco. Although the "Gator" was voted to be the mascot for the team in 1931, local newspaper articles called the team the "Staters" from 1935 through 1940.

== Schedule ==
Date	Opponent	Site	Result	Source
September 17	San Mateo	Roberts Field; San Francisco, CA	L 8–20	
September 24	Cal Aggies	Roberts Field; San Francisco, CA	L 7–13	
October 1	Chico State	Roberts Field; San Francisco, CA	W 13–12	
October 8	San Francisco Junior College	Roberts Field; San Francisco, CA	L 7–12\	
October 22	at Santa Rosa	Bailey Field; Santa Rosa, CA	T 0–0	
October 30	at Cal Poly	Mustang Stadium; San Luis Obispo, CA	L 0–33	
November 5	at Sacramento	Sacramento, CA	L 14–33	
November 11	at Linfield	Maxwell Field; McMinnville, OR	L 0–19	
