= 1937 Idaho Vandals football team =

American college football season

1937 Idaho Vandals football
- Conference: Pacific Coast Conference
- Record: 4–3–1 (2–2 PCC)
- Head coach: Ted Bank (3rd season)
- Home stadium: Neale Stadium

1937 Pacific Coast Conference football standings
	Conf.					Overall
Team	W		L		T	W		L		T
No. 2 California $	6	–	0	–	1	10	–	0	–	1
Stanford	4	–	2	–	1	4	–	3	–	2
Washington	4	–	2	–	2	7	–	2	–	2
Washington State	3	–	3	–	2	3	–	3	–	3
Idaho	2	–	2	–	0	4	–	3	–	1
Oregon State	2	–	3	–	3	3	–	3	–	3
USC	2	–	3	–	2	4	–	4	–	2
Oregon	2	–	5	–	0	4	–	6	–	0
UCLA	1	–	5	–	1	2	–	6	–	1
Montana	0	–	1	–	0	7	–	1	–	0
$ – Conference champion; Rankings from AP Poll

The 1937 Idaho Vandals football team represented the University of Idaho in the 1937 college football season. The Vandals were led by third-year head coach Ted Bank, and were members of the Pacific Coast Conference. Home games were played on campus in Moscow at the new Neale Stadium, with one in Boise at Public School Field.

Led on the field by passing halfback Hal Roise, Idaho compiled a 4–3–1 overall record and were 2–2 in the PCC. The recently completed Neale Stadium hosted an upset homecoming win over favored Oregon State, the first of four straight wins to open the venue.

In the Battle of the Palouse with neighbor Washington State, the Vandals suffered a tenth straight loss, falling 13–0 in the rain in Pullman on October 2. Idaho's most recent win in the series was a dozen years earlier in 1925 and the next was seventeen years away, in 1954.

The Vandals finished the season with a pair of 6–0 shutout victories over Gonzaga in Spokane, and Montana in Moscow. It was the only loss of the year for the Grizzlies and their only conference game scheduled. The team recorded four shutouts and yielded only 53 points in eight games, but tallied only 35 and went scoreless three times.

The winning season was the first for Idaho football in a decade and it was followed up with a better record in 1938. Future coaches among the Vandal players included Tony Knap, Lyle Smith, and Steve Belko.

== Schedule ==
Date	Opponent	Site	Result	Attendance	Source
September 25	Oregon State^{†}	Neale Stadium; Moscow, ID	W 7–6	7,000	
October 2	at Washington State	Rogers Field; Pullman, WA (Battle of the Palouse)	L 0–13	8,000	
October 9	at Utah*	Ute Stadium; Salt Lake City, UT	W 9–7		
October 16	Utah State*	Public School Field; Boise, ID	T 0–0		
October 22	at Saint Mary's*	Kezar Stadium; San Francisco, CA	L 0–6	12,000	
October 30	at Washington	Husky Stadium; Seattle, WA	L 7–21	14,105	
November 13	at Gonzaga*	Gonzaga Stadium; Spokane, WA (rivalry)	W 6–0		
November 20	Montana	Neale Stadium; Moscow, ID (rivalry)	W 6–0	6,000	
*Non-conference game; ^{†}Homecoming

== Coaching staff ==
- Bob Tessier, line
- Forrest Twogood
- Glenn Jacoby
- Al Paddock, freshmen

== All-conference ==
No Vandals were named to the All-Coast team; honorable mention were end Tony Knap, tackle George Thiessen, and guard Walter Musial.
