= George Malley =

George Malley may refer to:

- George Malley (American football) (1903–1979), American football coach
- George Malley (runner) (born 1955), American steeplechase and long-distance runner
