= 1937 New Mexico Lobos football team =

American college football season

1937 New Mexico Lobos football
- Conference: Border Conference
- Record: 4–4–1 (2–3–1 Border)
- Head coach: Ted Shipkey (1st season)
- Captain: William Murphy
- Home stadium: University Field

1937 Border Conference football standings
	Conf.					Overall
Team	W		L		T	W		L		T
Texas Tech $	3	–	0	–	0	8	–	4	–	0
New Mexico A&M	4	–	1	–	0	7	–	2	–	0
Arizona	3	–	1	–	0	8	–	2	–	0
Texas Mines	2	–	1	–	1	7	–	1	–	2
New Mexico	2	–	3	–	1	4	–	4	–	1
Arizona State–Flagstaff	1	–	4	–	0	5	–	5	–	0
Arizona State	0	–	5	–	0	0	–	8	–	1
$ – Conference champion

The 1937 New Mexico Lobos football team represented the University of New Mexico as a member of the Border Conference during the 1937 college football season. In their first season under head coach Ted Shipkey, the Lobos compiled an overall record of 4–4–1 record with a mark of 2–3–1 against conference opponents, finished fourth in the Border Conference, and were outscored by opponents by a total of 93 to 69. William Murphy was the team captain.

== Schedule ==
Date	Opponent	Site	Result	Attendance	Source
September 25	Silver City Teachers*	University Field; Albuquerque, NM	W 14–0		
October 1	at Denver*	DU Stadium; Denver, CO	L 0–12	10,000	
October 8	at New Mexico A&M	Quesenberry Field; Las Cruces, NM (rivalry)	L 0–5		
October 16	Texas Mines	University Field; Albuquerque, NM	T 7–7		
October 23	at Texas Tech	Tech Field; Lubbock, TX	L 0–27	7,500	
October 30	Arizona State	University Field; Albuquerque, NM	W 15–7		
November 6	at Colorado College*	Washburn Field; Colorado Springs, CO	W 26–6		
November 13	Arizona^{†}	University Field; Albuquerque, NM (rivalry)	L 0–23	5,200	
November 25	Arizona State–Flagstaff	University Stadium; Albuquerque, NM	W 7–6	6,000	
*Non-conference game; ^{†}Homecoming
