= 1937 Cal Poly Mustangs football team =

American college football season

1937 Cal Poly Mustangs football
- Conference: Independent
- Record: 4–2–2
- Head coach: Howie O'Daniels (5th season)
- Home stadium: Mustang Stadium

1937 Western college football independents records
| | Conf. | | | Overall |
| Team | W | L | T | W | | L | | T |
|---|---|---|---|---|---|---|---|---|
| No. T–9 Santa Clara | | – | | 9 | – | 0 | – | 0 |
| San Jose State | | – | | 11 | – | 2 | – | 1 |
| Pomona | | – | | 6 | – | 2 | – | 1 |
| Humboldt State | | – | | 4 | – | 2 | – | 0 |
| Idaho Southern Branch | | – | | 6 | – | 3 | – | 0 |
| Cal Poly | | – | | 4 | – | 2 | – | 2 |
| Portland | | – | | 4 | – | 3 | – | 1 |
| Saint Mary's | | – | | 4 | – | 3 | – | 2 |
| San Francisco | | – | | 4 | – | 5 | – | 1 |
| Loyola (CA) | | – | | 4 | – | 7 | – | 0 |
| Gonzaga | | – | | 2 | – | 6 | – | 2 |
| Hawaii | | – | | 2 | – | 6 | – | 0 |
| San Francisco State | | – | | 1 | – | 6 | – | 1 |
Rankings from AP Poll

The 1937 Cal Poly Mustangs football team represented California Polytechnic School—now known as California Polytechnic State University, San Luis Obispo—as an independent during the 1937 college football season. Led by fifth-year head coach Howie O'Daniels, Cal Poly compiled a record of 4–2–2. The team outscored its opponents 82 to 34 for the season. The Mustangs played home games at Mustang Stadium in San Luis Obispo, California.

Cal Poly was a two-year school until 1941 and competed as an independent from 1929 to 1945.

== Schedule ==
| Date | Opponent | Site | Result | Attendance | Source |
|---|---|---|---|---|---|
| September 24 | at Modesto | Modesto, CA | T 0–0 | | |
| October 2 | at Salinas | Salinas, CA | W 18–0 | | |
| October 15 | at Humboldt State | Albee Stadium; Eureka, CA | L 0–14 | 1,700 | |
| October 23 | San Jose State freshmen | Mustang Stadium; San Luis Obispo, CA | W 6–0 | | |
| October 30 | San Francisco State | Mustang Stadium; San Luis Obispo, CA | W 33–0 | | |
| November 5 | at Santa Maria | Santa Maria, CA | L 12–13 | | |
| November 11 | San Francisco freshmen | Mustang Stadium; San Luis Obispo, CA | T 0–0 | | |
| November 25 | at Idaho Southern Branch | Spud Bowl; Pocatello, ID | W 13–7 | | |
