= 1937 Cal Aggies football team =

American college football season

1937 Cal Aggies football
- Conference: Far Western Conference
- Record: 4–4 (2–2 FWC)
- Head coach: Vern Hickey (1st season)
- Captain: Dave Peterson
- Home stadium: A Street field

1937 Far Western Conference football standings
	Conf.					Overall
Team	W		L		T	W		L		T
Fresno State $	4	–	0	–	0	8	–	1	–	1
Pacific (CA)	3	–	1	–	0	3	–	5	–	2
Cal Aggies	2	–	2	–	0	4	–	4	–	0
Nevada	1	–	3	–	0	2	–	6	–	0
Chico State	0	–	4	–	0	0	–	6	–	1
$ – Conference champion

The 1937 Cal Aggies football team represented the Northern Branch of the College of Agriculture—now known as the University of California, Davis—as a member of the Far Western Conference (FWC) during the 1937 college football season. Led by first-year head coach Vern Hickey, the Aggies compiled an overall record of 4–4 with a mark of 2–2 in conference play, placing third in the FWC. The team was outscored by its opponents 87 to 63 for the season. The Cal Aggies played home games at A Street field on campus in Davis, California.

== Schedule ==
Date	Time	Opponent	Site	Result	Attendance	Source
September 24		at San Francisco State*	Roberts Field; San Francisco, CA	W 13–7		
October 1	8:00 p.m.	at Sacramento*	Sacramento Stadium; Sacramento, CA	W 6–0		
October 9		at BYU*	Cougar Stadium (Note: This stadium is the predecessor to the current Cougar Stadium on the BYU campus, which was opened for the 1964 season); Provo, UT	L 0–34	3,000	
October 16		at California*	California Memorial Stadium; Berkeley, CA	L 0–14	20,000	
October 22		Fresno State	A Street field; Davis, CA	L 0–19	3,500	
October 30		at Nevada	Mackay Stadium (Note: This stadium is the predecessor to the current Mackay Stadium, which was opened for the 1966 season.); Reno, NV	W 12–0		
November 6		Chico State	A Street field; Davis, CA	W 26–0		
November 13		Pacific (CA)	A Street field; Davis, CA	L 6–13		
*Non-conference game; All times are in Pacific time
