= 1937 Chico State Wildcats football team =

American college football season

1937 Chico State Wildcats football
- Conference: Far Western Conference
- Record: 0–6–1 (0–4 FWC)
- Head coach: Art Acker (15th season)
- Home stadium: College Field

1937 Far Western Conference football standings
	Conf.					Overall
Team	W		L		T	W		L		T
Fresno State $	4	–	0	–	0	8	–	1	–	1
Pacific (CA)	3	–	1	–	0	3	–	5	–	2
Cal Aggies	2	–	2	–	0	4	–	4	–	0
Nevada	1	–	3	–	0	2	–	6	–	0
Chico State	0	–	4	–	0	0	–	6	–	1
$ – Conference champion

The 1937 Chico State Wildcats football team represented Chico State College—now known as California State University, Chico—as a member of the Far Western Conference (FWC) during the 1937 college football season. Led by Art Acker in his 15th and final season as head, Chico State compiled an overall record of 0–6–1 with a mark of 0–4 in conference play, placing last out of five teams in the FWC. The team was outscored by its opponents 155 to 39 for the season. The Wildcats played home games at College Field in Chico, California.

Acker finished his tenure at Chico State with an overall record of 53–59–8, for a .475 winning percentage. His 15 years was the longest tenure for any head coach of the Chico State Wildcats football program.

== Schedule ==
Date	Time	Opponent	Site	Result	Attendance	Source
October 1		at San Francisco State*	Roberts Field; San Francisco, CA	L 12–13		
October 8		at Pacific (CA)	Baxter Stadium; Stockton, CA	L 0–13		
October 16		Nevada	College Field; Chico, CA	L 0–27		
October 30		at Fresno State	Fresno State College Stadium; Fresno, CA	L 40–7	3,082	
November 6		at Cal Aggies	Davis, CA	L 0–26		
November 13		Southern Oregon Normal*	College Field; Chico, CA	T 6–6		
November 19	8:00 p.m.	at Sacramento*	Sacramento Stadium; Sacramento, CA	L 14–30		
*Non-conference game; All times are in Pacific time
