= 1937 San Diego State Aztecs football team =

American college football season

1937 San Diego State Aztecs football

SCC champion
- Conference: Southern California Conference
- Record: 7–1 (4–1 SCC)
- Head coach: Leo Calland (3rd season)
- Home stadium: Aztec Bowl

1937 Southern California Conference football standings
	Conf.					Overall
Team	W		L		T	W		L		T
San Diego State $	4	–	1	–	0	7	–	1	–	0
Santa Barbara State	3	–	1	–	1	5	–	2	–	2
Redlands	2	–	1	–	2	3	–	3	–	2
Whittier	2	–	2	–	1	2	–	6	–	2
Occidental	1	–	2	–	2	2	–	2	–	3
La Verne	0	–	5	–	0	0	–	9	–	0
$ – Conference champion

The 1937 San Diego State Aztecs football team represented San Diego State College (Note: San Diego State University was known as San Diego State College from 1935 to 1971.) during the 1937 college football season.

San Diego State competed in the Southern California Intercollegiate Athletic Conference (SCIAC). The 1937 San Diego State team was led by head coach Leo B. Calland in his third season with the Aztecs. They played home games at Aztec Bowl in San Diego, California. The Aztecs finished the season as champion of the SCIAC, with seven wins and one loss (7–1, 4–1 SCIAC). Overall, the team scored 90 points for the season while giving up only 16. They shut out their opponents in 6 of the 8 games. The only blemish on the season was a one-point loss to Redlands.

== Schedule ==
Date	Opponent	Site	Result	Attendance	Source
October 2	Occidental	Aztec Bowl; San Diego, CA	W 3–0	4,000	
October 9	Whittier	Aztec Bowl; San Diego, CA	W 6–0	5,000	
October 16	La Verne	Aztec Bowl; San Diego, CA	W 26–0		
October 23	New Mexico A&M*	Aztec Bowl; San Diego, CA	W 20–0	7,500	
November 6	Redlands^{†}	Aztec Bowl; San Diego, CA	L 9–10	4,500	
November 11	at San Diego Marines (Note: The Marine Corps Recruit Depot (MCRD) in San Diego fielded a team that played against colleges and other military teams from 1922 to 1964.)*	Balboa Stadium; San Diego, CA	W 6–0	9,000	
November 20	at Santa Barbara State	Peabody Stadium; Santa Barbara, CA	W 13–0	8,000	
November 25	at San Jose State*	Spartan Stadium; San Jose, CA	W 7–6	8,000	
*Non-conference game; ^{†}Homecoming
