= 1937 Utah Utes football team =

American college football season

1937 Utah Utes football
- Conference: Rocky Mountain Conference
- Record: 5–3 (5–2 RMC)
- Head coach: Ike Armstrong (13th season)
- Home stadium: Ute Stadium

1937 Rocky Mountain Conference football standings
	Conf.					Overall
Team	W		L		T	W		L		T
No. 17 Colorado $	7	–	0	–	0	8	–	1	–	0
Western State (CO)	3	–	1	–	0	5	–	3	–	0
BYU	5	–	2	–	0	6	–	3	–	0
Denver	5	–	2	–	0	6	–	3	–	0
Utah	5	–	2	–	0	5	–	3	–	0
Colorado College	3	–	3	–	0	5	–	4	–	0
Utah State	2	–	4	–	1	2	–	4	–	2
Wyoming	2	–	4	–	0	3	–	5	–	0
Colorado State–Greeley	2	–	4	–	0	2	–	6	–	0
Colorado Mines	1	–	5	–	0	2	–	5	–	0
Colorado A&M	1	–	6	–	0	1	–	7	–	0
Montana State	0	–	3	–	1	3	–	4	–	1
$ – Conference champion; Rankings from AP poll

The 1937 Utah Utes football team was an American football team that represented the University of Utah as a member of the Rocky Mountain Conference (RMC) during the 1937 college football season. In their 13th season under head coach Ike Armstrong, the Utes compiled an overall record of 5–3 with a mark of 5–2 in conference play, tied for third place in the RMC, and outscored all opponents by a total of 133 to 52.

== Schedule ==
Date	Opponent	Site	Result	Attendance	Source
September 25	at Montana State	Gatton Field; Bozeman, MT	W 19–7		
October 2	BYU	Ute Stadium; Salt Lake City, UT (rivalry)	W 14–0	15,000	
October 9	Idaho*	Ute Stadium; Salt Lake City, UT	L 7–9		
October 16	at Colorado State–Greeley	Jackson Field; Greeley, CO	W 7–6		
October 23	Denver	Ute Stadium; Salt Lake City, UT	L 7–13	13,000	
November 6	Colorado^{†}	Ute Stadium; Salt Lake City, UT (rivalry)	L 7–17		
November 13	at Colorado A&M	Colorado Field; Fort Collins, CO	W 45–0		
November 25	Utah State	Ute Stadium; Salt Lake City, UT (rivalry)	W 27–0		
*Non-conference game; ^{†}Homecoming

== NFL draft ==
The following Utes were selected in the 1938 NFL draft following the season.

Round	Pick	Player	Position	NFL club
6	46	Karl Schleckman	Tackle	Detroit Lions
9	74	Paul McDonough	End	Pittsburgh Pirates
