= 1937 Montana Grizzlies football team =

American college football season

1937 Montana Grizzlies football
- Conference: Pacific Coast Conference
- Record: 7–1 (0–1 PCC)
- Head coach: Doug Fessenden (3rd season)
- Captain: Milt Popovich
- Home stadium: Dornblaser Field

1937 Pacific Coast Conference football standings
	Conf.					Overall
Team	W		L		T	W		L		T
No. 2 California $	6	–	0	–	1	10	–	0	–	1
Stanford	4	–	2	–	1	4	–	3	–	2
Washington	4	–	2	–	2	7	–	2	–	2
Washington State	3	–	3	–	2	3	–	3	–	3
Idaho	2	–	2	–	0	4	–	3	–	1
Oregon State	2	–	3	–	3	3	–	3	–	3
USC	2	–	3	–	2	4	–	4	–	2
Oregon	2	–	5	–	0	4	–	6	–	0
UCLA	1	–	5	–	1	2	–	6	–	1
Montana	0	–	1	–	0	7	–	1	–	0
$ – Conference champion; Rankings from AP Poll

The 1937 Montana Grizzlies football team represented the University of Montana in the 1937 college football season as a member of the Pacific Coast Conference (PCC). The Grizzlies were led by third-year head coach Doug Fessenden, played their home games at Dornblaser Field and finished the season with a record of seven wins and one loss (7–1, 0–1 PCC).

== Schedule ==
Date	Opponent	Site	Result	Attendance	Source
September 25	Whitman*	Dornblaser Field; Missoula, MT	W 25–0	4,000	
October 1	at Texas Tech*	Tech Field; Lubbock, TX	W 13–6	8,000	
October 9	Oklahoma City*	Memorial Stadium; Great Falls, MT	W 36–6	5,000	
October 16	San Francisco*	Clark Park; Butte, MT	W 13–7	7,000	
October 30	vs. Montana State*	Clark Park; Butte, MT (rivalry)	W 19–0		
November 6	Gonzaga*	Dornblaser Field; Missoula, MT	W 23–0		
November 20	at Idaho	Neale Stadium; Moscow, ID (rivalry)	L 0–6	6,000	
November 25	North Dakota*	Dornblaser Field; Missoula, MT	W 14–3	6,000	
*Non-conference game; Source:

== After the season ==
The following Grizzlies were selected in the 1938 NFL draft after the season.

Round	Pick	Player	Position	NFL club
2	15	Milt Popovich	Back	Chicago Cardinals
7	56	Paul Szakash	Back	Detroit Lions
8	63	Len Noyes	Tackle	Brooklyn Dodgers
