= 1937 San Francisco Dons football team =

American college football season

1937 San Francisco Dons football
- Conference: Independent
- Record: 4–5–1
- Head coach: George Malley (1st season)
- Home stadium: Kezar Stadium

1937 Western college football independents records
| | Conf. | | | Overall |
| Team | W | L | T | W | | L | | T |
|---|---|---|---|---|---|---|---|---|
| No. T–9 Santa Clara | | – | | 9 | – | 0 | – | 0 |
| San Jose State | | – | | 11 | – | 2 | – | 1 |
| Pomona | | – | | 6 | – | 2 | – | 1 |
| Humboldt State | | – | | 4 | – | 2 | – | 0 |
| Idaho Southern Branch | | – | | 6 | – | 3 | – | 0 |
| Cal Poly | | – | | 4 | – | 2 | – | 2 |
| Portland | | – | | 4 | – | 3 | – | 1 |
| Saint Mary's | | – | | 4 | – | 3 | – | 2 |
| San Francisco | | – | | 4 | – | 5 | – | 1 |
| Loyola (CA) | | – | | 4 | – | 7 | – | 0 |
| Gonzaga | | – | | 2 | – | 6 | – | 2 |
| Hawaii | | – | | 2 | – | 6 | – | 0 |
| San Francisco State | | – | | 1 | – | 6 | – | 1 |
Rankings from AP Poll

The 1937 San Francisco Dons football team was an American football team that represented the University of San Francisco as an independent during the 1937 college football season. In their first season under head coach George Malley, the Dons compiled a 4–5–1 record and were outscored by their opponents by a combined total of 85 to 48.

== Schedule ==
| Date | Opponent | Site | Result | Attendance | Source |
|---|---|---|---|---|---|
| September 19 | St. Mary's (TX) | Kezar Stadium; San Francisco | W 7–0 | 20,000 | |
| October 2 | Daniel Baker | Kezar Stadium; San Francisco | W 21–0 | 2,500 | |
| October 10 | Santa Clara | Kezar Stadium; San Francisco | L 0–13 | 30,000 | |
| October 16 | at Montana | Clark Park; Butte, MT | L 7–13 | 7,000 | |
| October 24 | at Gonzaga | Spokane, WA | W 7–0 | | |
| October 31 | at Loyola (CA) | Gilmore Stadium; Los Angeles | W 6–0 | 9,000 | |
| November 7 | Saint Mary's | Kezar Stadium; San Francisco | L 0–3 | 55,000 | |
| November 14 | at Portland | Portland, OR | T 0–0 | | |
| November 27 | Michigan State | Kezar Stadium; San Francisco | L 0–14 | 20,000 | |
| December 4 | Texas A&M | Kezar Stadium; San Francisco | L 0–42 | | |
