= 1937 Montana State Bobcats football team =

American college football season

1937 Montana State Bobcats football
- Conference: Rocky Mountain Conference
- Record: 3–4–1 (0–3–1 RMC)
- Head coach: Jack Croft (2nd season)
- Captain: Clifford Norris
- Home stadium: Gatton Field

1937 Rocky Mountain Conference football standings
	Conf.					Overall
Team	W		L		T	W		L		T
No. 17 Colorado $	7	–	0	–	0	8	–	1	–	0
Western State (CO)	3	–	1	–	0	5	–	3	–	0
BYU	5	–	2	–	0	6	–	3	–	0
Denver	5	–	2	–	0	6	–	3	–	0
Utah	5	–	2	–	0	5	–	3	–	0
Colorado College	3	–	3	–	0	5	–	4	–	0
Utah State	2	–	4	–	1	2	–	4	–	2
Wyoming	2	–	4	–	0	3	–	5	–	0
Colorado State–Greeley	2	–	4	–	0	2	–	6	–	0
Colorado Mines	1	–	5	–	0	2	–	5	–	0
Colorado A&M	1	–	6	–	0	1	–	7	–	0
Montana State	0	–	3	–	1	3	–	4	–	1
$ – Conference champion; Rankings from AP poll

The 1937 Montana State Bobcats football team was an American football team that represented Montana State College (later renamed Montana State University) in the Rocky Mountain Conference (RMC) during the 1937 college football season In its second season under head coach Jack Croft, the team compiled a 3–4–1 record (0–3–1 against RMC opponents), yet outscored opponents by a total of 171 to 105. Clifford Norris was the team captain.

== Schedule ==
Date	Opponent	Site	Result	Attendance	Source
September 25	Utah^{†}	Gatton Field; Bozeman, MT	L 7–19		
October 2	at Utah State	Aggie Stadium; Logan, UT	T 6–6		
October 8	at Colorado State–Greeley	Jackson Field; Greeley, CO	L 26–33		
October 16	Idaho Southern Branch*	Gatton Field; Bozeman, MT	W 25–7		
October 30	vs. Montana*	Clark Park; Butte, MT (rivalry)	L 0–19		
November 6	Montana Mines*	Gatton Field; Bozeman, MT	W 33–2	400	
November 11	at Carroll (MT)*	Helena High School; Helena, MT	W 74–0		
November 20	at BYU	BYU Stadium; Provo, UT	L 0–19	7,000	
*Non-conference game; ^{†}Homecoming
