= 1937 Washington Huskies football team =

American college football season

1937 Washington Huskies football

Poi Bowl, W 53–13 vs. Hawaii
- Conference: Pacific Coast Conference
- Record: 7–2–2 (4–2–2 PCC)
- Head coach: Jimmy Phelan
- Captain: Frank Waskowitz
- Home stadium: University of Washington Stadium

1937 Pacific Coast Conference football standings
	Conf.					Overall
Team	W		L		T	W		L		T
No. 2 California $	6	–	0	–	1	10	–	0	–	1
Stanford	4	–	2	–	1	4	–	3	–	2
Washington	4	–	2	–	2	7	–	2	–	2
Washington State	3	–	3	–	2	3	–	3	–	3
Idaho	2	–	2	–	0	4	–	3	–	1
Oregon State	2	–	3	–	3	3	–	3	–	3
USC	2	–	3	–	2	4	–	4	–	2
Oregon	2	–	5	–	0	4	–	6	–	0
UCLA	1	–	5	–	1	2	–	6	–	1
Montana	0	–	1	–	0	7	–	1	–	0
$ – Conference champion; Rankings from AP Poll

The 1937 Washington Huskies football team was an American football team that represented the University of Washington during the 1937 college football season. In its eighth season under head coach Jimmy Phelan, the team compiled a 7–2–2 record, finished in third place in the Pacific Coast Conference, and outscored all opponents by a combined total of 187 to 52. Frank Waskowitz was the team captain.

== Schedule ==
Date	Opponent	Rank	Site	Result	Attendance	Source
September 25	Iowa*		University of Washington Stadium; Seattle, WA	W 14–0	20,000	
October 2	at USC		Los Angeles Memorial Coliseum; Los Angeles, CA	W 7–0	75,000	
October 9	Oregon State		University of Washington Stadium; Seattle, WA	L 3–6	15,000	
October 16	at Washington State		Rogers Field; Pullman, WA (rivalry)	T 7–7	17,000	
October 23	Stanford		University of Washington Stadium; Seattle, WA	L 7–13	22,000	
October 30	Idaho		University of Washington Stadium; Seattle, WA	W 21–7	14,105	
November 6	at No. 1 California		California Memorial Stadium; Berkeley, CA	T 0–0	18,765	
November 13	UCLA		University of Washington Stadium; Seattle, WA	W 26–0	3,000	
November 20	Oregon		University of Washington Stadium; Seattle, WA (rivalry)	W 14–0	19,000	
January 1, 1938	at Hawaii*	No. 13	Honolulu Stadium; Honolulu, Territory of Hawaii (Poi Bowl)	W 53–13	13,500–19,963	
January 6	at Honolulu Townies*	No. 13	Honolulu Stadium; Honolulu, Territory of Hawaii	W 35–6	6,558	
*Non-conference game; Rankings from AP Poll released prior to the game; Source:

== NFL draft selections ==
One University of Washington Husky was selected in the 1938 NFL draft, which lasted twelve rounds, with 110 selections.

= Husky Hall of Fame

Player	Position	Round	Pick	NFL club
Vic Markov	Tackle	4	1	Cleveland Rams

== Game summaries ==
=== California ===
This tie with Washington was the only blemish in an undefeated (10-0-1) season by the Golden Bears. The game finished with tension when Washington's Al Cruver missed a 38-yard field goal attempt with less than a minute on the clock.

Washington Huskies at California

Quarter	1	2	3	4	Total
Washington	0	0	0	0	0
California	0	0	0	0	0

at California Memorial Stadium • Berkeley, California

- Date: November 21
- Game attendance: 18,675
