= 1937 Colorado Buffaloes football team =

American football team

1937 Colorado Buffaloes football

RMC champion

Cotton Bowl, L 14–28 vs. Rice
- Conference: Rocky Mountain Conference

Ranking
- AP: No. 17
- Record: 8–1 (7–0 RMC)
- Head coach: Bunny Oakes (3rd season)
- Captain: Game captains
- Home stadium: Colorado Stadium

1937 Rocky Mountain Conference football standings
	Conf.					Overall
Team	W		L		T	W		L		T
No. 17 Colorado $	7	–	0	–	0	8	–	1	–	0
Western State (CO)	3	–	1	–	0	5	–	3	–	0
BYU	5	–	2	–	0	6	–	3	–	0
Denver	5	–	2	–	0	6	–	3	–	0
Utah	5	–	2	–	0	5	–	3	–	0
Colorado College	3	–	3	–	0	5	–	4	–	0
Utah State	2	–	4	–	1	2	–	4	–	2
Wyoming	2	–	4	–	0	3	–	5	–	0
Colorado State–Greeley	2	–	4	–	0	2	–	6	–	0
Colorado Mines	1	–	5	–	0	2	–	5	–	0
Colorado A&M	1	–	6	–	0	1	–	7	–	0
Montana State	0	–	3	–	1	3	–	4	–	1
$ – Conference champion; Rankings from AP poll

The 1937 Colorado Buffaloes football team was an American football team that represented the University of Colorado as a member of the Rocky Mountain Conference (RMC) during the 1937 college football season. Led by third-year head coach Bunny Oakes, the Buffaloes won all eight games in the regular season, with a 7–0 mark in conference play, winning the RMC title. Ranked seventeenth, undefeated Colorado was invited to the Cotton Bowl in Dallas on New Year's Day, but lost to No. 18 Rice to finish at 8–1. This was the CU program's final year in the RMC, as they moved to the Mountain States Conference the following year.

Senior back Byron "Whizzer" White, a Rhodes scholar and future justice of the U.S. Supreme Court, was a consensus All-American, the runner-up for the Heisman Trophy, and the fourth overall pick of the 1938 NFL draft.

== Schedule ==
Date	Opponent	Rank	Site	Result	Attendance	Source
October 2	Missouri*		Colorado Stadium; Boulder, CO	W 14–6		
October 9	Utah State		Colorado Stadium; Boulder, CO	W 33–0		
October 16	BYU		Colorado Stadium; Boulder, CO	W 14–0		
October 23	Colorado A&M^{†}		Colorado Stadium; Boulder, CO (rivalry)	W 47–0		
October 30	Colorado Mines		Colorado Stadium; Boulder, CO	W 54–0		
November 6	at Utah		Ute Stadium; Salt Lake City, UT (rivalry)	W 17–7		
November 13	Colorado College	No. 16	Colorado Stadium; Boulder, CO	W 35–6		
November 25	at Denver	No. 16	Hilltop Stadium; Denver, CO	W 34–7		
January 1, 1938	vs. No. 18 Rice*	No. 17	Cotton Bowl; Dallas, TX (Cotton Bowl Classic)	L 14–28	37,000–38,000	
*Non-conference game; ^{†}Homecoming; Rankings from AP Poll released prior to the game

== After the season ==
=== NFL draft ===
The following Buffaloes were selected in the 1938 NFL draft following the season.

Round	Pick	Player	Position	NFL club
1	4	Byron White	Back	Pittsburgh Panthers
4	28	Gene Moore	Center	Brooklyn Dodgers
8	65	Leon Lavington	End	Chicago Cardinals
