= 1937 Santa Barbara State Gauchos football team =

American college football season

1937 Santa Barbara State Gauchos football
- Conference: Southern California Conference
- Record: 5–2–2 (3–1–1 SCC)
- Head coach: Spud Harder (4th season)
- Home stadium: Peabody Stadium

1937 Southern California Conference football standings
	Conf.					Overall
Team	W		L		T	W		L		T
San Diego State $	4	–	1	–	0	7	–	1	–	0
Santa Barbara State	3	–	1	–	1	5	–	2	–	2
Redlands	2	–	1	–	2	3	–	3	–	2
Whittier	2	–	2	–	1	2	–	6	–	2
Occidental	1	–	2	–	2	2	–	2	–	3
La Verne	0	–	5	–	0	0	–	9	–	0
$ – Conference champion

The 1937 Santa Barbara State Gauchos football team represented Santa Barbara State (Note: University of California, Santa Barbara was known as Santa Barbara State College from 1921 to 1943.) during the 1937 college football season.

Santa Barbara State competed in the Southern California Intercollegiate Athletic Conference (SCIAC). The Gauchos were led by fourth-year head coach Theodore "Spud" Harder and played home games at Peabody Stadium in Santa Barbara, California. They finished the season with a record of five wins, two losses and two ties (5–2–2, 3–1–1 SCIAC). Overall, the team outscored its opponents 138–49 for the season.

== Schedule ==
Date	Opponent	Site	Result	Attendance	Source
September 24	Occidental	Peabody Stadium; Santa Barbara, CA	T 0–0		
October 8	Arizona State*	Peabody Stadium; Santa Barbara, CA	W 27–7	6,000	
October 15	at Redlands	Redlands Stadium (Note: This stadium is the predecessor to the current Ted Runner Stadium on the University of Redlands campus, which was opened for the 1968 season); Redlands, CA	W 31–0		
October 22	Texas Mines*	Peabody Stadium; Santa Barbara, CA	T 13–13		
October 29	at Whittier	Hadley Field; Whittier, CA	W 20–0		
November 6	La Verne	Peabody Stadium; Santa Barbara, CA	W 20–0		
November 13	Nevada*	Peabody Stadium; Santa Barbara, CA	W 20–7		
November 20	San Diego State	Peabody Stadium; Santa Barbara, CA	L 0–13	8,000	
December 4	at New Mexico A&M*	Quesenberry Field; Las Cruces, NM	L 7–9	6,000	
*Non-conference game

== Team players in the NFL ==
No Santa Barbara Gaucho players were selected in the 1938 NFL draft.

The following finished their Santa Barbara career in 1937, were not drafted, but played in the NFL.

Player	Position	First NFL team
Howie Yeager	Wingback	1941 New York Giants
