= 1937 Idaho Southern Branch Bengals football team =

American college football season

1937 Idaho Southern Branch Bengals football
- Conference: Independent
- Record: 6–3
- Head coach: Guy Wicks (3rd season)
- Captain: Otto Tronowsky (Note: Tronowsky was inducted to the Idaho State University athletic hall of fame in 1988.)
- Home stadium: Spud Bowl

1937 Western college football independents records
| | Conf. | | | Overall |
| Team | W | L | T | W | | L | | T |
|---|---|---|---|---|---|---|---|---|
| No. T–9 Santa Clara | | – | | 9 | – | 0 | – | 0 |
| San Jose State | | – | | 11 | – | 2 | – | 1 |
| Pomona | | – | | 6 | – | 2 | – | 1 |
| Humboldt State | | – | | 4 | – | 2 | – | 0 |
| Idaho Southern Branch | | – | | 6 | – | 3 | – | 0 |
| Cal Poly | | – | | 4 | – | 2 | – | 2 |
| Portland | | – | | 4 | – | 3 | – | 1 |
| Saint Mary's | | – | | 4 | – | 3 | – | 2 |
| San Francisco | | – | | 4 | – | 5 | – | 1 |
| Loyola (CA) | | – | | 4 | – | 7 | – | 0 |
| Gonzaga | | – | | 2 | – | 6 | – | 2 |
| Hawaii | | – | | 2 | – | 6 | – | 0 |
| San Francisco State | | – | | 1 | – | 6 | – | 1 |
Rankings from AP Poll

The 1937 Idaho Southern Branch Bengals football team was an American football team that represented the University of Idaho, Southern Branch (later renamed Idaho State University) as an independent during the 1937 college football season. In their third season under head coach Guy Wicks, the team compiled a 6–3 record and outscored opponents by a total of 213 to 66.

Future Idaho State head football coach Babe Caccia played on the team.

== Schedule ==
| Date | Opponent | Site | Result | Attendance | Source |
|---|---|---|---|---|---|
| September 24 | at Gooding College | Gooding, ID | W 18–7 | | |
| October 2 | Ricks | Spud Bowl; Pocatello, ID | W 45–0 | | |
| October 8 | at Boise Junior College | Public School Field; Boise, ID | W 45–0 | | |
| October 16 | at Montana State | Gatton Field; Bozeman, MT | L 7–25 | | |
| October 30 | Montana Mines | Spud Bowl; Pocatello, ID | W 39–6 | | |
| November 6 | at Albion Normal (Note: Albion Normal is listed in some sources as Southern Idaho, a name adopted in 1947.) | Howard Field; Albion, ID | W 7–6 | | |
| November 11 | College of Idaho^{†} | Spud Bowl; Pocatello, ID | W 39–0 | | |
| November 20 | at Western State (CO) | Gunnison, CO | L 6–9 | | |
| November 25 | Cal Poly | Spud Bowl; Pocatello, ID | L 7–13 | | |
^{†}Homecoming
