= 1937 UCLA Bruins football team =

American college football season

1937 UCLA Bruins football
- Conference: Pacific Coast Conference
- Record: 2–6–1 (1–5–1 PCC)
- Head coach: William H. Spaulding (13th season)
- Home stadium: Los Angeles Memorial Coliseum

1937 Pacific Coast Conference football standings
	Conf.					Overall
Team	W		L		T	W		L		T
No. 2 California $	6	–	0	–	1	10	–	0	–	1
Stanford	4	–	2	–	1	4	–	3	–	2
Washington	4	–	2	–	2	7	–	2	–	2
Washington State	3	–	3	–	2	3	–	3	–	3
Idaho	2	–	2	–	0	4	–	3	–	1
Oregon State	2	–	3	–	3	3	–	3	–	3
USC	2	–	3	–	2	4	–	4	–	2
Oregon	2	–	5	–	0	4	–	6	–	0
UCLA	1	–	5	–	1	2	–	6	–	1
Montana	0	–	1	–	0	7	–	1	–	0
$ – Conference champion; Rankings from AP Poll

The 1937 UCLA Bruins football team was an American football team that represented the University of California, Los Angeles during the 1937 college football season. In their 13th year under head coach William H. Spaulding, the Bruins compiled a 2–6–1 record (1–5–1 conference) and finished in ninth place in the Pacific Coast Conference. Only Montana, at the bottom of the table, placed lower than the Bruins in the PCC that season.

== Schedule ==
Date	Opponent	Site	Result	Attendance	Source
September 24	Oregon	Los Angeles Memorial Coliseum; Los Angeles, CA	W 26–13	40,000	
October 9	at Stanford	Stanford Stadium; Stanford, CA	L 7–12	15,000	
October 16	at Oregon State	Bell Field; Corvallis, OR	T 7–7	10,000	
October 23	Washington State	Los Angeles Memorial Coliseum; Los Angeles, CA	L 0–3	20,000	
October 30	No. 1 California^{†}	Los Angeles Memorial Coliseum; Los Angeles, CA (rivalry)	L 14–27	55,000–65,000	
November 13	at Washington	Husky Stadium; Seattle, WA	L 0–26	3,000	
November 20	SMU*	Los Angeles Memorial Coliseum; Los Angeles, CA	L 13–26	35,000	
November 27	Missouri*	Los Angeles Memorial Coliseum; Los Angeles, CA	W 13–0	20,000	
December 4	USC	Los Angeles Memorial Coliseum; Los Angeles, CA (Victory Bell)	L 13–19	70,000	
*Non-conference game; ^{†}Homecoming; Rankings from AP Poll released prior to the game; Source:
