= 1937 Arizona Wildcats football team =

American college football season

1937 Arizona Wildcats football
- Conference: Border Conference
- Record: 8–2 (3–1 Border)
- Head coach: Tex Oliver (5th season)
- Captain: None
- Home stadium: Arizona Stadium

1937 Border Conference football standings
	Conf.					Overall
Team	W		L		T	W		L		T
Texas Tech $	3	–	0	–	0	8	–	4	–	0
New Mexico A&M	4	–	1	–	0	7	–	2	–	0
Arizona	3	–	1	–	0	8	–	2	–	0
Texas Mines	2	–	1	–	1	7	–	1	–	2
New Mexico	2	–	3	–	1	4	–	4	–	1
Arizona State–Flagstaff	1	–	4	–	0	5	–	5	–	0
Arizona State	0	–	5	–	0	0	–	8	–	1
$ – Conference champion

The 1937 Arizona Wildcats football team represented the University of Arizona in the Border Conference during the 1937 college football season. In their fifth and final season under head coach Tex Oliver, the Wildcats compiled an 8–2 record (3–1 against Border opponents), finished in third place in the conference, and outscored their opponents, 194 to 88. The team played home games at Arizona Stadium in Tucson, Arizona.

== Schedule ==
Date	Opponent	Site	Result	Attendance	Source
October 2	Arizona State	Arizona Stadium; Tucson, AZ (rivalry)	W 20–6	7,500	
October 9	vs. Oklahoma A&M*	Phoenix Union High School; Phoenix, AZ	W 22–13	12,000	
October 16	at Texas Tech	Tech Field; Lubbock, TX	L 0–20	4,500	
October 23	Centenary (LA)*	Arizona Stadium; Tucson, AZ	L 13–18		
October 30	New Mexico A&M	Arizona Stadium; Tucson, AZ	W 27–12		
November 6	at Loyola (CA)*	Gilmore Stadium; Los Angeles, CA	W 13–6		
November 13	at New Mexico	University Field; Albuquerque, NM (rivalry)	W 23–0	5,200	
November 20	Kansas*^{†}	Arizona Stadium; Tucson, AZ	W 9–7	9,000	
November 25	Colorado A&M*	Arizona Stadium; Tucson, AZ	W 47–0	7,500	
December 4	Oregon*	Arizona Stadium; Tucson, AZ	W 20–6	9,500	
*Non-conference game; ^{†}Homecoming
