= Doug Fessenden =

American football coach and administrator

Biographical details
- Born: September 7, 1901; Onawa, Iowa, U.S.
- Died: June 11, 1970 (aged 68); San Francisco, California, U.S.

Playing career

Track and field
- c. 1922: Illinois

Coaching career (HC unless noted)

Football
- 1925–1927: Main Avenue HS (TX)
- 1928–1929: Brownville HS (TX)
- 1930–1934: Fenger Academy HS (IL)
- 1935–1941: Montana
- 1945: AAF Training Command
- 1946–1948: Montana

Administrative career (AD unless noted)
- 1935–1949: Montana

Head coaching record
- Overall: 54–43–5 (college)
- Bowls: 0–1
- Tournaments: 1 AAF League (1945)

Accomplishments and honors

Awards
- Kaimin Man of the Year (1935)

Douglas A. Fessenden (September 7, 1901 – June 11, 1970) was an American football coach and college athletics administrator.

Fessenden began his coaching career in 1925 at Main Avenue High School—now known as Fox Tech High School—in San Antonio, Texas. He moved to Brownsville High School in Brownsville, Texas in 1928. Fessenden was head football coach at Fenger High School in Chicago from 1930 to 1934, before coming head coach at the University of Montana in April 1935. Fessenden served two separate stints as Montana's head coach, from 1935 to 1941 and again from 1946 to 1948.

The 1937 season included a then school record of six consecutive victories. Fessenden resigned as Montana's football coach after the 1948 season and received his doctors degree in physical education from Columbia University in 1949. Fessenden concluded his coaching career with Montana's best win and loss record.

Fessenden died in San Francisco, California on June 11, 1970.

== Head coaching record ==
=== College ===
Year	Team	Overall	Conference	Standing	Bowl/playoffs
Montana Grizzlies (Pacific Coast Conference) (1935–1941)
1935	Montana	1–5–2	0–5–1	10th	
1936	Montana	6–3	1–3	8th	
1937	Montana	7–1	0–1	10th	
1938	Montana	5–3–1	0–1	10th	
1939	Montana	3–6	1–2	7th	
1940	Montana	4–4–1	1–2	8th	
1941	Montana	6–3	1–3	9th	
Army Air Forces Training Command Skymasters (Army Air Forces League) (1945)
1945	Army Air Forces Training Command	8–3–1	4–1–1	T–1st	L Legion Bowl
Army Air Forces Training Command:		8–3–1	4–1–1		
Montana Grizzlies (Pacific Coast Conference) (1946–1948)
1946	Montana	4–4	1–3	7th	
1947	Montana	7–4	2–1	5th	
1948	Montana	3–7	0–3	10th	
Montana:		46–40–4	7–24–1		
Total:		54–43–5			
National championship Conference title Conference division title or championship game berth
