= 1937 Gonzaga Bulldogs football team =

American college football season

1937 Gonzaga Bulldogs football
- Conference: Independent
- Record: 2–6–2
- Head coach: Mike Pecarovich (7th season)
- Home stadium: Gonzaga Stadium

1937 Western college football independents records
	Conf.			Overall
Team	W	L	T	W		L		T
No. T–9 Santa Clara		–		9	–	0	–	0
San Jose State		–		11	–	2	–	1
Pomona		–		6	–	2	–	1
Humboldt State		–		4	–	2	–	0
Idaho Southern Branch		–		6	–	3	–	0
Cal Poly		–		4	–	2	–	2
Portland		–		4	–	3	–	1
Saint Mary's		–		4	–	3	–	2
San Francisco		–		4	–	5	–	1
Loyola (CA)		–		4	–	7	–	0
Gonzaga		–		2	–	6	–	2
Hawaii		–		2	–	6	–	0
San Francisco State		–		1	–	6	–	1
Rankings from AP Poll

The 1937 Gonzaga Bulldogs football team was an American football team that represented Gonzaga University as an independent during the 1937 college football season. In their seventh year under head coach Mike Pecarovich, the Bulldogs compiled a 2–6–2 record and were outscored by a total of 138 to 44.

== Schedule ==
Date	Time	Opponent	Site	Result	Attendance	Source
September 25		Washington State	Gonzaga Stadium; Spokane, WA	T 0–0	14,000	
October 3		at Saint Mary's	Kezar Stadium; San Francisco, CA	T 0–0		
October 9		Oregon	Gonzaga Stadium; Spokane, WA	L 6–40		
October 15	8:00 p.m.	Eastern Washington	Gonzaga Stadium; Spokane, WA	W 27–20	5,000	
October 24		San Francisco	Kezar Stadium; San Francisco, CA	L 0–7		
November 6		at Montana	Dornblaser Field; Missoula, MT	L 0–23		
November 13		Idaho	Gonzaga Stadium; Spokane, WA	L 0–6		
November 20		at Portland	Multnomah Stadium; Portland, OR	W 3–2	6,500	
November 28		vs. Santa Clara	City College Stadium; Sacramento, CA	L 0–27	18,000	
December 5		at Loyola (CA)	Gilmore Stadium; Los Angeles, CA	L 8–13	12,000	
All times are in Pacific time
