= 1937 Arizona State Bulldogs football team =

American college football season

1937 Arizona State Bulldogs football
- Conference: Border Conference
- Record: 0–8–1 (0–5 Border)
- Head coach: Rudy Lavik (5th season)
- Captains: Clare Van Hoorebeke; Marvin Palmer
- Home stadium: Goodwin Stadium

1937 Border Conference football standings
	Conf.					Overall
Team	W		L		T	W		L		T
Texas Tech $	3	–	0	–	0	8	–	4	–	0
New Mexico A&M	4	–	1	–	0	7	–	2	–	0
Arizona	3	–	1	–	0	8	–	2	–	0
Texas Mines	2	–	1	–	1	7	–	1	–	2
New Mexico	2	–	3	–	1	4	–	4	–	1
Arizona State–Flagstaff	1	–	4	–	0	5	–	5	–	0
Arizona State	0	–	5	–	0	0	–	8	–	1
$ – Conference champion

The 1937 Arizona State Bulldogs football team was an American football team that represented Arizona State Teachers College (later renamed Arizona State University) in the Border Conference during the 1937 college football season. In their fifth and final season under head coach Rudy Lavik, the Bulldogs compiled a 0–8–1 record (0–5 against Border opponents) and were outscored by their opponents by a combined total of 140 to 32.

The team captains were quarterback Clare Van Hoorebeke and halfback Marvin Palmer. The Bulldogs finished 0–3–1 at home and 0–5 on the road. John Allen, Ford Hoffman, and Earl Pomeroy were assistant coaches. All home games were played at Goodwin Stadium in Tempe, Arizona.

== Schedule ==
Date	Opponent	Site	Result	Attendance	Source
October 2	at Arizona	Arizona Stadium; Tucson, AZ (rivalry)	L 6–20	7,500	
October 8	at Santa Barbara State*	Peabody Stadium; Santa Barbara, CA	L 7–27	6,000	
October 16	at San Diego Marines*	Lane Field; San Diego, CA	L 0–7	2,500	
October 23	Arizona State–Flagstaff	Goodwin Stadium; Tempe, AZ	L 0–7		
October 30	at New Mexico	University Field; Albuquerque, NM	L 7–15		
November 6	Whittier*	Goodwin Stadium; Tempe, AZ	T 6–6		
November 11	Texas Mines	Goodwin Stadium; Tempe, AZ	L 0–19		
November 20	San Jose State*	Goodwin Stadium; Tempe, AZ	L 6–25		
November 25	at New Mexico A&M	Quesenberry Field; Las Cruces, NM	L 0–14		
*Non-conference game

== Game summaries ==
In the season opener, Arizona State suffered a 20–6 road loss against Arizona in Tucson. The Bulldogs dropped a 27–7 road contest to California-Santa Barbara, which was the first ever meeting between the teams in school history. Arizona State fell to the San Diego Marines 7–0 on the road. In their home opener, the Bulldogs were shutout for the second straight game, as NAU prevailed 7–0 at Goodwin Stadium. Despite an 85-yard punt return touchdown by Leo Burns, Arizona State suffered a 15–7 road loss against New Mexico. The Bulldogs played Whittier to a 6–6 tie in Tempe. Arizona State was shut out by Texas-El Paso 19–0 at Goodwin Stadium. The Bulldogs dropped their home finale to San Jose State, 25–6. Arizona State closed its season with a 14–0 road shutout loss against New Mexico State.

== Roster ==
The usual Arizona State lineup included left end Emerson Harvey, left tackle Steve Setka, left guard Noble Riggs, center Wes Hastings, right guard Al Arvizi, right tackle Henry Rockwell, right end Glenn Landreth, quarterback Clare Van Hoorebeke, halfbacks Warner Fritsch and Marvin Palmer and fullback Shelby Phoele.

Guy Acuff, Wiley Aiker, Ted Anderson, Hilbert Brady, Stanford Brimhall, Leo Burns, Francis Clevenger, and Jim Curtis were also on roster.
