= 1937 Texas Mines Miners football team =

American college football season

1937 Texas Mines Miners football
- Conference: Border Conference
- Record: 7–1–2 (2–1–1 Border)
- Head coach: Mack Saxon (9th season)
- Home stadium: Kidd Field

1937 Border Conference football standings
	Conf.					Overall
Team	W		L		T	W		L		T
Texas Tech $	3	–	0	–	0	8	–	4	–	0
New Mexico A&M	4	–	1	–	0	7	–	2	–	0
Arizona	3	–	1	–	0	8	–	2	–	0
Texas Mines	2	–	1	–	1	7	–	1	–	2
New Mexico	2	–	3	–	1	4	–	4	–	1
Arizona State–Flagstaff	1	–	4	–	0	5	–	5	–	0
Arizona State	0	–	5	–	0	0	–	8	–	1
$ – Conference champion

The 1937 Texas Mines Miners football team was an American football team that represented Texas School of Mines (now known as University of Texas at El Paso) as a member of the Border Conference during the 1937 college football season. In its ninth season under head coach Mack Saxon, the team compiled a 7–1–2 record (2–1–1 against Border Conference opponents), finished fourth in the conference, and outscored opponents by a total of 215 to 91.

Quarterback Ken Heineman set two school records (since surpassed) with 407 yards of total offense and 296 all-purpose yards in a game against Arizona State-Flagstaff. At the end of the season, Heineman was named to the Little All-America teams selected by NEA and Collyer's. He was also selected as a first-team player on the All-Border Conference football team.

== Schedule ==
Date	Opponent	Site	Result	Attendance	Source
September 24	at New Mexico A&M	Quesenberry Field; Las Cruces, NM (rivalry)	L 0–14	3,000	
October 2	at New Mexico Military*	Roswell, NM	W 19–3		
October 9	West Texas State*	Kidd Field; El Paso, TX	W 16–14	5,000	
October 16	at New Mexico	University Stadium; Albuquerque, NM	T 7–7		
October 22	at Santa Barbara State*	Peabody Stadium; Santa Barbara, CA	T 13–13		
October 30	Colorado State–Greeley*	Kidd Field; El Paso, TX	W 20–0	4,500	
November 6	Arizona State–Flagstaff^{†}	Kidd Field; El Paso, TX	W 53–13	5,500	
November 11	at Arizona State	Goodwin Stadium; Tempe, AZ	W 19–0		
November 20	Sul Ross*	Kidd Field; El Paso, TX	W 34–20	6,000	
November 27	St. Edward's*	Kidd Field; El Paso, TX	W 34–7	5,000	
*Non-conference game; ^{†}Homecoming
