= 1937 Arizona State–Flagstaff Lumberjacks football team =

American college football season

1937 Arizona State–Flagstaff Lumberjacks football
- Conference: Border Conference
- Record: 5–5 (1–4 Border)
- Head coach: Garrett Arbelbide (2nd season)
- Home stadium: Skidmore Field

1937 Border Conference football standings
	Conf.					Overall
Team	W		L		T	W		L		T
Texas Tech $	3	–	0	–	0	8	–	4	–	0
New Mexico A&M	4	–	1	–	0	7	–	2	–	0
Arizona	3	–	1	–	0	8	–	2	–	0
Texas Mines	2	–	1	–	1	7	–	1	–	2
New Mexico	2	–	3	–	1	4	–	4	–	1
Arizona State–Flagstaff	1	–	4	–	0	5	–	5	–	0
Arizona State	0	–	5	–	0	0	–	8	–	1
$ – Conference champion

The 1937 Arizona State–Flagstaff Lumberjacks football team represented Arizona State Teachers College at Flagstaff (now known as Northern Arizona University) as a member of the Border Conference during the 1937 college football season. Led by second-year head coach Garrett Arbelbide, the Lumberjacks compiled an overall record of 5–5, with a conference record of 1–4, and finished sixth in the Border.

== Schedule ==
Date	Opponent	Site	Result	Attendance	Source
September 18	at Texas Tech	Tech Field; Lubbock, TX	L 0–6	4,200	
September 24	at Whittier*	Hadley Field; Whittier, CA	W 9–0		
October 2	Caltech*	Skidmore Field; Flagstaff, AZ	W 26–7		
October 8	at San Jose State*	Spartan Stadium; San Jose, CA	L 6–21	9,500	
October 16	New Mexico A&M	Skidmore Field; Flagstaff, AZ	L 0–7		
October 23	at Arizona State	Goodwin Stadium; Tempe, AZ	W 7–0		
October 30	New Mexico Normal*	Skidmore Field; Flagstaff, AZ	W 61–7		
November 6	at Texas Mines	Kidd Field; El Paso, TX	L 13–53	5,500	
November 11	La Verne*	Skidmore Field; Flagstaff, AZ	W 20–7		
November 25	at New Mexico	University Field; Albuquerque, NM	L 6–7	6,000	
*Non-conference game
