= 1937 Saint Mary's Gaels football team =

American college football season

1937 Saint Mary's Gaels football
- Conference: Independent
- Record: 4–3–2
- Head coach: Slip Madigan (17th season)
- Home stadium: Kezar Stadium

1937 Western college football independents records
	Conf.			Overall
Team	W	L	T	W		L		T
No. T–9 Santa Clara		–		9	–	0	–	0
San Jose State		–		11	–	2	–	1
Pomona		–		6	–	2	–	1
Humboldt State		–		4	–	2	–	0
Idaho Southern Branch		–		6	–	3	–	0
Cal Poly		–		4	–	2	–	2
Portland		–		4	–	3	–	1
Saint Mary's		–		4	–	3	–	2
San Francisco		–		4	–	5	–	1
Loyola (CA)		–		4	–	7	–	0
Gonzaga		–		2	–	6	–	2
Hawaii		–		2	–	6	–	0
San Francisco State		–		1	–	6	–	1
Rankings from AP Poll

The 1937 Saint Mary's Gaels football team was an American football team that represented Saint Mary's College of California during the 1937 college football season. In their 17th season under head coach Slip Madigan, the Gaels compiled a 4–3–2 record and outscored their opponents by a combined total of 71 to 50.

== Schedule ==
Date	Opponent	Site	Result	Attendance	Source
September 25	at California	California Memorial Stadium; Berkeley, CA	L 7–30	65,000	
October 3	Gonzaga	Kezar Stadium; San Francisco, CA	T 0–0		
October 9	Nevada	Kezar Stadium; San Francisco, CA	W 42–0	< 2,000	
October 17	at Loyola (CA)	Los Angeles Memorial Coliseum; Los Angeles, CA	W 13–7	25,000	
October 22	Idaho	Kezar Stadium; San Francisco, CA	W 6–0	12,000	
October 30	at Pacific (CA)	Baxter Stadium; Stockton, CA	T 0–0	10,000	
November 7	vs. San Francisco	Kezar Stadium; San Francisco, CA	W 3–0	55,000	
November 14	vs. Santa Clara	Kezar Stadium; San Francisco, CA	L 0–7	50,000	
November 20	at No. 4 Fordham	Polo Grounds; New York, NY	L 0–6	35,000	
Rankings from Coaches' Poll released prior to the game
