= 1937 Santa Clara Broncos football team =

American college football season

1937 Santa Clara Broncos football

Sugar Bowl champion

Sugar Bowl, W 6–0 vs. LSU
- Conference: Independent

Ranking
- AP: No. T–9
- Record: 9–0
- Head coach: Buck Shaw (2nd season)
- Home stadium: Kezar Stadium

1937 Western college football independents records
	Conf.			Overall
Team	W	L	T	W		L		T
No. T–9 Santa Clara		–		9	–	0	–	0
San Jose State		–		11	–	2	–	1
Pomona		–		6	–	2	–	1
Humboldt State		–		4	–	2	–	0
Idaho Southern Branch		–		6	–	3	–	0
Cal Poly		–		4	–	2	–	2
Portland		–		4	–	3	–	1
Saint Mary's		–		4	–	3	–	2
San Francisco		–		4	–	5	–	1
Loyola (CA)		–		4	–	7	–	0
Gonzaga		–		2	–	6	–	2
Hawaii		–		2	–	6	–	0
San Francisco State		–		1	–	6	–	1
Rankings from AP Poll

The 1937 Santa Clara Broncos football team represented Santa Clara University as an independent during the 1937 college football season. In their second season under head coach Buck Shaw, the Broncos won all nine games, shut out seven, and outscored all opponents by a combined total of 163 to 9. In the final AP poll released in late November, Santa Clara was ranked ninth, tied with Notre Dame.

The Broncos' victories included a 13–7 besting of Stanford, a 38–0 victory over Marquette, and a 6–0 victory over eighth-ranked LSU in the Sugar Bowl.

Two Broncos received honors on the 1937 All-Pacific Coast football team: tackle Alvord Wolff (AP-1); and guard Dougherty (INS-1).

== Schedule ==
Date	Opponent	Rank	Site	Result	Attendance	Source
September 25	at Stanford		Stanford Stadium; Stanford, CA	W 13–7	35,000	
October 10	vs. San Francisco		Kezar Stadium; San Francisco, CA	W 13–0	30,000	
October 17	Portland		Kezar Stadium; San Francisco, CA	W 27–0	7,000	
October 24	at Loyola (CA)	No. 14	Los Angeles Memorial Coliseum; Los Angeles, CA	W 7–0		
October 30	vs. Marquette	No. 14	Soldier Field; Chicago, IL	W 38–0	40,000	
November 6	at San Jose State	No. 10	Spartan Stadium; San Jose, CA	W 25–2		
November 14	vs. Saint Mary's	No. 7	Kezar Stadium; San Francisco, CA	W 7–0		
November 28	vs. Gonzaga	No. 8	City College Stadium; Sacramento, CA	W 27–0	18,000	
January 1, 1938	vs. No. 8 LSU	No. 9	Tulane Stadium; New Orleans, LA (Sugar Bowl)	W 6–0	40,000	
Rankings from AP Poll released prior to the game

== After the season ==
=== NFL draft ===
The following Bronco was selected in the 1938 NFL draft following the season.

Round	Pick	Player	Position	NFL team
9	75	Phil Dougherty	Center	Chicago Cardinals
