= 1937 Oregon State Beavers football team =

American college football season

1937 Oregon State Beavers football
- Conference: Pacific Coast Conference
- Record: 3–3–3 (2–3–3 PCC)
- Head coach: Lon Stiner (5th season)
- Home stadium: Bell Field

1937 Pacific Coast Conference football standings
	Conf.					Overall
Team	W		L		T	W		L		T
No. 2 California $	6	–	0	–	1	10	–	0	–	1
Stanford	4	–	2	–	1	4	–	3	–	2
Washington	4	–	2	–	2	7	–	2	–	2
Washington State	3	–	3	–	2	3	–	3	–	3
Idaho	2	–	2	–	0	4	–	3	–	1
Oregon State	2	–	3	–	3	3	–	3	–	3
USC	2	–	3	–	2	4	–	4	–	2
Oregon	2	–	5	–	0	4	–	6	–	0
UCLA	1	–	5	–	1	2	–	6	–	1
Montana	0	–	1	–	0	7	–	1	–	0
$ – Conference champion; Rankings from AP Poll

The 1937 Oregon State Beavers football team represented Oregon State College in the Pacific Coast Conference (PCC) during the 1937 college football season.

In their fifth season under head coach Lon Stiner, the Beavers compiled a 3–3–3 record (2–3–3 against PCC opponents), finished in sixth place in the PCC, and outscored their opponents, 69 to 60.

The team played its home games at Bell Field in Corvallis, Oregon.

Despite playing only three of their nine games at home, the 1937 OSC squad finished the season ranked #52 nationally.

== Schedule ==
Date	Opponent	Site	Result	Attendance	Source
September 25	at Idaho	Neale Stadium; Moscow, ID	L 6–7	7,000	
October 2	at California	California Memorial Stadium; Berkeley, CA	L 6–24	23,000	
October 9	at Washington	Husky Stadium; Seattle, WA	W 6–3	15,000	
October 16	UCLA	Bell Field; Corvallis, OR	T 7–7	10,000	
October 23	at Oregon	Hayward Field; Eugene, OR (rivalry)	W 14–0	17,000	
October 30	at Stanford	Stanford Stadium; Stanford, CA	T 0–0	20,000	
November 6	Willamette*	Bell Field; Corvallis, OR	W 20–0	3,500	
November 13	at USC	Los Angeles Memorial Coliseum; Los Angeles, CA	T 12–12	35,000	
November 20	Washington State	Bell Field; Corvallis, OR	L 0–7	12,000	
*Non-conference game

== Roster ==
- HB Joe Gray, Sr.
