= 1937 Pacific Tigers football team =

American college football season

1937 Pacific Tigers football
- Conference: Far Western Conference
- Record: 3–5–2 (3–1 FWC)
- Head coach: Amos Alonzo Stagg (5th season)
- Home stadium: Baxter Stadium

1937 Far Western Conference football standings
| | Conf. | | | | | Overall |
| Team | W | | L | | T | W | | L | | T |
|---|---|---|---|---|---|---|---|---|---|---|
| Fresno State $ | 4 | – | 0 | – | 0 | 8 | – | 1 | – | 1 |
| Pacific (CA) | 3 | – | 1 | – | 0 | 3 | – | 5 | – | 2 |
| Cal Aggies | 2 | – | 2 | – | 0 | 4 | – | 4 | – | 0 |
| Nevada | 1 | – | 3 | – | 0 | 2 | – | 6 | – | 0 |
| Chico State | 0 | – | 4 | – | 0 | 0 | – | 6 | – | 1 |
$ – Conference champion

The 1937 Pacific Tigers football team represented the College of the Pacific—now known as the University of the Pacific—in Stockton, California as a member of the Far Western Conference (FWC) during the 1937 college football season. Led by fifth-year head coach Amos Alonzo Stagg, Pacific compiled an overall record of 3–5–2 with a mark of 3–1 in conference play, placing second in the FWC. The team was outscored by its opponents 122 to 58 for the season. The Tigers played home games at Baxter Stadium in Stockton.

== Schedule ==
| Date | Opponent | Site | Result | Attendance | Source |
|---|---|---|---|---|---|
| September 25 | at USC* | Los Angeles Memorial Coliseum; Los Angeles, CA | L 0–40 | 35,000 | |
| October 1 | San Jose State* | Baxter Stadium; Stockton, CA (rivalry) | L 7–12 | | |
| October 8 | Chico State | Baxter Stadium; Stockton, CA | W 13–0 | | |
| October 16 | at California* | California Memorial Stadium; Berkeley, CA | L 0–20 | 20,000 | |
| October 23 | at Nevada | Mackay Stadium (Note: This stadium is the predecessor to the current Mackay Stadium, which was opened for the 1966 season.); Reno, NV | W 7–3 | | |
| October 30 | Saint Mary's*^{†} | Baxter Stadium; Stockton, CA | T 0–0 | | |
| November 5 | California JV* | Baxter Stadium; Stockton, CA | L 4–7 | | |
| November 13 | at Cal Aggies | A Street field; Davis, CA | W 13–6 | | |
| November 25 | at Fresno State | Fresno State College Stadium; Fresno, CA | L 0–20 | 10,053 | |
| December 4 | at San Diego Marines (Note: The Marine Corps Recruit Depot (MCRD) in San Diego fielded a team that played against colleges and other military teams from 1922 to 1964.)* | Balboa Stadium ?; San Diego | T 14–14 | | |
*Non-conference game; ^{†}Homecoming
