= 1937 New Mexico A&M Aggies football team =

American college football season

1937 New Mexico A&M Aggies football
- Conference: Border Conference
- Record: 7–2 (4–1 Border)
- Head coach: Jerry Hines (9th season)
- Home stadium: Quesenberry Field

1937 Border Conference football standings
	Conf.					Overall
Team	W		L		T	W		L		T
Texas Tech $	3	–	0	–	0	8	–	4	–	0
New Mexico A&M	4	–	1	–	0	7	–	2	–	0
Arizona	3	–	1	–	0	8	–	2	–	0
Texas Mines	2	–	1	–	1	7	–	1	–	2
New Mexico	2	–	3	–	1	4	–	4	–	1
Arizona State–Flagstaff	1	–	4	–	0	5	–	5	–	0
Arizona State	0	–	5	–	0	0	–	8	–	1
$ – Conference champion

The 1937 New Mexico A&M Aggies football team was an American football team that represented New Mexico College of Agriculture and Mechanical Arts (now known as New Mexico State University) as a member of the Border Conference during the 1937 college football season. In their ninth year under head coach Jerry Hines, the Aggies compiled a 7–2 record (4–1 against conference opponents), finished second in the conference, and outscored all opponents by a total of 128 to 60. The team played its five home games at Quesenberry Field in Las Cruces, New Mexico.

== Schedule ==
Date	Opponent	Site	Result	Attendance	Source
September 24	Texas Mines	Quesenberry Field; Las Cruces, NM (rivalry)	W 14–0		
October 1	Silver City Teachers*	Quesenberry Field; Las Cruces, NM	W 34–0		
October 8	New Mexico^{†}	Quesenberry Field; Las Cruces, NM (rivalry)	W 5–0		
October 16	at Arizona State–Flagstaff	Skidmore Field; Flagstaff, AZ	W 7–0		
October 23	at San Diego State*	Aztec Bowl; San Diego, CA	L 0–20	4,000	
October 30	at Arizona	Arizona Stadium; Tucson, AZ	L 12–27		
November 13	Western State (CO)*	Quesenberry Field; Las Cruces, NM	W 33–6		
November 25	Arizona State	Quesenberry Field; Las Cruces, NM	W 14–0		
December 4	Santa Barbara State*	Quesenberry Field; Las Cruces, NM	W 9–7	6,000	
*Non-conference game; ^{†}Homecoming
