= 1937 BYU Cougars football team =

American college football season

1937 BYU Cougars football
- Conference: Rocky Mountain Conference
- Record: 6–3 (5–2 RMC)
- Head coach: Eddie Kimball (1st season)
- Home stadium: BYU Stadium

1937 Rocky Mountain Conference football standings
	Conf.					Overall
Team	W		L		T	W		L		T
No. 17 Colorado $	7	–	0	–	0	8	–	1	–	0
Western State (CO)	3	–	1	–	0	5	–	3	–	0
BYU	5	–	2	–	0	6	–	3	–	0
Denver	5	–	2	–	0	6	–	3	–	0
Utah	5	–	2	–	0	5	–	3	–	0
Colorado College	3	–	3	–	0	5	–	4	–	0
Utah State	2	–	4	–	1	2	–	4	–	2
Wyoming	2	–	4	–	0	3	–	5	–	0
Colorado State–Greeley	2	–	4	–	0	2	–	6	–	0
Colorado Mines	1	–	5	–	0	2	–	5	–	0
Colorado A&M	1	–	6	–	0	1	–	7	–	0
Montana State	0	–	3	–	1	3	–	4	–	1
$ – Conference champion; Rankings from AP poll

The 1937 BYU Cougars football team was an American football team that represented Brigham Young University (BYU) as a member of the Rocky Mountain Conference (RMC) during the 1937 college football season. In their first season under head coach Eddie Kimball, the Cougars compiled an overall record of 6–3 with a mark of 5–2 against conference opponents, tied for third place in the RMC, and outscored opponents by a total of 164 to 41.

== Schedule ==
Date	Opponent	Site	Result	Attendance	Source
September 25	Colorado State–Greeley	BYU Stadium; Provo, UT	W 7–0	4,000	
October 2	at Utah	Ute Stadium; Salt Lake City, UT (rivalry)	L 0–14	15,000	
October 9	Cal Aggies*	BYU Stadium; Provo, UT	W 34–0	3,000	
October 16	at Colorado	Colorado Stadium; Boulder, CO	L 0–14		
October 23	at Portland*	Multnomah Stadium; Portland, OR	L 10–13		
October 30	Western State (CO)	BYU Stadium; Provo, UT	W 21–0	3,500	
November 6	at Wyoming	Corbett Field; Laramie, WY	W 19–0	4,500	
November 13	at Utah State	Aggie Stadium; Logan, UT(rivalry)	W 54–10	6,000	
November 20	Montana State^{†}	BYU Stadium; Provo, UT	W 19–0	7,000	
*Non-conference game; ^{†}Homecoming
