= 1937 Utah State Aggies football team =

American college football season

1937 Utah State Aggies football
- Conference: Rocky Mountain Conference
- Record: 2–4–2 (2–4–1 RMC)
- Head coach: Dick Romney (19th season)
- Home stadium: Aggie Stadium

1937 Rocky Mountain Conference football standings
	Conf.					Overall
Team	W		L		T	W		L		T
No. 17 Colorado $	7	–	0	–	0	8	–	1	–	0
Western State (CO)	3	–	1	–	0	5	–	3	–	0
BYU	5	–	2	–	0	6	–	3	–	0
Denver	5	–	2	–	0	6	–	3	–	0
Utah	5	–	2	–	0	5	–	3	–	0
Colorado College	3	–	3	–	0	5	–	4	–	0
Utah State	2	–	4	–	1	2	–	4	–	2
Wyoming	2	–	4	–	0	3	–	5	–	0
Colorado State–Greeley	2	–	4	–	0	2	–	6	–	0
Colorado Mines	1	–	5	–	0	2	–	5	–	0
Colorado A&M	1	–	6	–	0	1	–	7	–	0
Montana State	0	–	3	–	1	3	–	4	–	1
$ – Conference champion; Rankings from AP poll

The 1937 Utah State Aggies football team was an American football team that represented Utah State Agricultural College in the Rocky Mountain Conference (RMC) during the 1937 college football season. In their 19th season under head coach Dick Romney, the Aggies compiled a 2–4–2 record (2–4–1 against RMC opponents), tied for seventh in the RMC, and were outscored by a total of 152 to 47.

== Schedule ==
Date	Opponent	Site	Result	Attendance	Source
October 2	Montana State	Aggie Stadium; Logan, UT	T 6–6		
October 9	at Colorado	Colorado Stadium; Boulder, CO	L 0–33		
October 16	at Idaho*	Neale Stadium; Moscow, ID	T 0–0		
October 23	Wyoming	Aggie Stadium; Logan, UT (rivalry)	W 34–7		
October 30	Colorado A&M	Aggie Stadium; Logan, UT	W 7–0		
November 6	at Denver	DU Stadium; Denver, CO	L 0–25	10,000	
November 13	BYU	Aggie Stadium; Logan, UT (rivalry)	L 0–54	6,000	
November 25	at Utah	Ute Stadium; Salt Lake City, UT (rivalry)	L 0–27	15,000	
*Non-conference game
