= 1937 Loyola Lions football team =

American college football season

1937 Loyola Lions football
- Conference: Independent
- Record: 4–7
- Head coach: Tom Lieb (8th season)
- Home stadium: Gilmore Stadium; Los Angeles Memorial Coliseum

1937 Western college football independents records
| | Conf. | | | Overall |
| Team | W | L | T | W | | L | | T |
|---|---|---|---|---|---|---|---|---|
| No. T–9 Santa Clara | | – | | 9 | – | 0 | – | 0 |
| San Jose State | | – | | 11 | – | 2 | – | 1 |
| Pomona | | – | | 6 | – | 2 | – | 1 |
| Humboldt State | | – | | 4 | – | 2 | – | 0 |
| Idaho Southern Branch | | – | | 6 | – | 3 | – | 0 |
| Cal Poly | | – | | 4 | – | 2 | – | 2 |
| Portland | | – | | 4 | – | 3 | – | 1 |
| Saint Mary's | | – | | 4 | – | 3 | – | 2 |
| San Francisco | | – | | 4 | – | 5 | – | 1 |
| Loyola (CA) | | – | | 4 | – | 7 | – | 0 |
| Gonzaga | | – | | 2 | – | 6 | – | 2 |
| Hawaii | | – | | 2 | – | 6 | – | 0 |
| San Francisco State | | – | | 1 | – | 6 | – | 1 |
Rankings from AP Poll

The 1937 Loyola Lions football team was an American football team that represented Loyola University of Los Angeles (now known as Loyola Marymount University) as an independent during the 1937 college football season. In their eighth season under head coach Tom Lieb, the Lions compiled a 4–7 record.

== Schedule ==
| Date | Opponent | Site | Result | Attendance | Source |
|---|---|---|---|---|---|
| September 24 | Caltech | Gilmore Stadium; Los Angeles, CA | W 28–7 | 10,000 | |
| October 1 | Redlands | Gilmore Stadium; Los Angeles, CA | W 27–0 | 16,000 | |
| October 8 | Hardin–Simmons | Gilmore Stadium; Los Angeles, CA | L 0–7 | 18,000 | |
| October 17 | Saint Mary's | Los Angeles Memorial Coliseum; Los Angeles, CA | L 7–13 | 25,000 | |
| October 24 | No. 8 Santa Clara | Los Angeles Memorial Coliseum; Los Angeles, CA | L 0–7 | 25,000 | |
| October 31 | San Francisco | Gilmore Stadium; Los Angeles, CA | L 0–6 | 9,000 | |
| November 5 | Arizona | Gilmore Stadium; Los Angeles, CA | L 6–13 | | |
| November 11 | Centenary | Los Angeles Memorial Coliseum; Los Angeles, CA | W 14–7 | 16,000 | |
| November 20 | vs. Baylor | Beaumont, TX | L 13–27 | 5,500 | |
| November 28 | No. 7 Villanova | Los Angeles Memorial Coliseum; Los Angeles, CA | L 0–25 | 20,000 | |
| December 5 | Gonzaga | Gilmore Stadium; Los Angeles, CA | W 13–8 | 12,000 | |
Rankings from Coaches' Poll released prior to the game
