= 1937 Humboldt State Lumberjacks football team =

American college football season

1937 Humboldt State Lumberjacks football
- Conference: Independent
- Record: 4–2
- Head coach: Charles F. Erb (3rd season)
- Home stadium: Albee Stadium

1937 Western college football independents records
	Conf.			Overall
Team	W	L	T	W		L		T
No. T–9 Santa Clara		–		9	–	0	–	0
San Jose State		–		11	–	2	–	1
Pomona		–		6	–	2	–	1
Humboldt State		–		4	–	2	–	0
Idaho Southern Branch		–		6	–	3	–	0
Cal Poly		–		4	–	2	–	2
Portland		–		4	–	3	–	1
Saint Mary's		–		4	–	3	–	2
San Francisco		–		4	–	5	–	1
Loyola (CA)		–		4	–	7	–	0
Gonzaga		–		2	–	6	–	2
Hawaii		–		2	–	6	–	0
San Francisco State		–		1	–	6	–	1
Rankings from AP Poll

The 1937 Humboldt State Lumberjacks football team represented Humboldt State College—now known as California State Polytechnic University, Humboldt—as an independent during the 1937 college football season. Led by Charles F. Erb in his third and final season as head coach, the Lumberjacks compiled a record of 4–2 and outscored their opponents 119 to 27 for the season. The team played home games at Albee Stadium in Eureka, California.

Erb finished his three-year tenure with an overall record of 15–6–1. His winning percentage of .705 is the second highest any coach in program history, behind Phil Sarboe's .729.

== Schedule ==
Date	Opponent	Site	Result	Attendance	Source
October 9	Southern Oregon Normal	Albee Stadium; Eureka, CA	W 34–0		
October 15	Cal Poly	Albee Stadium; Eureka, CA	W 14–0		
October 23	Santa Clara freshmen	Albee Stadium; Eureka, CA	L 6–7	7,000	
October 31	Saint Mary's freshmen	Albee Stadium; Eureka, CA	W 20–7		
November 7	Cardinal Athletic Club (Oakland, CA)	Albee Stadium; Eureka, CA	W 43–0		
November 13	San Jose State	Albee Stadium; Eureka, CA	L 2–13		
