= 1937 Portland Pilots football team =

American college football season

1937 Portland Pilots football
- Conference: Independent
- Record: 4–3–1
- Head coach: Robert L. Mathews (1st season)
- Home stadium: Multnomah Stadium

1937 Western college football independents records
	Conf.			Overall
Team	W	L	T	W		L		T
No. T–9 Santa Clara		–		9	–	0	–	0
San Jose State		–		11	–	2	–	1
Pomona		–		6	–	2	–	1
Humboldt State		–		4	–	2	–	0
Idaho Southern Branch		–		6	–	3	–	0
Cal Poly		–		4	–	2	–	2
Portland		–		4	–	3	–	1
Saint Mary's		–		4	–	3	–	2
San Francisco		–		4	–	5	–	1
Loyola (CA)		–		4	–	7	–	0
Gonzaga		–		2	–	6	–	2
Hawaii		–		2	–	6	–	0
San Francisco State		–		1	–	6	–	1
Rankings from AP Poll

The 1937 Portland Pilots football team was an American football team that represented the University of Portland as an independent during the 1937 college football season. In their first season under head coach Robert L. Mathews, the Pilots compiled a 4–3–1 record. The team played its home games at Multnomah Stadium in Portland, Oregon.

== Schedule ==
Date	Opponent	Site	Result	Attendance	Source
October 2	Pacific (OR)	Multnomah Stadium; Portland, OR	W 36–0		
October 9	Willamette	Multnomah Stadium; Portland, OR	L 0–20		
October 17	at Santa Clara	Kezar Stadium; San Francisco, CA	L 0–27	7,000	
October 23	BYU	Multnomah Stadium; Portland, OR	W 13–10		
October 30	at Linfield	McMinnville, OR	W 40–0		
November 5	Puget Sound	Multnomah Stadium; Portland, OR	W 31–0		
November 14	San Francisco	Multnomah Stadium; Portland, OR	T 0–0		
November 21	Gonzaga	Multnomah Stadium; Portland, OR	L 2–3	6,500	
