= 1937 Oregon Webfoots football team =

American college football season

1937 Oregon Webfoots football
- Conference: Pacific Coast Conference
- Record: 4–6 (2–5 PCC)
- Head coach: Prink Callison (6th season)
- Captain: Tony Amato
- Home stadium: Hayward Field, Multnomah Stadium

1937 Pacific Coast Conference football standings
	Conf.					Overall
Team	W		L		T	W		L		T
No. 2 California $	6	–	0	–	1	10	–	0	–	1
Stanford	4	–	2	–	1	4	–	3	–	2
Washington	4	–	2	–	2	7	–	2	–	2
Washington State	3	–	3	–	2	3	–	3	–	3
Idaho	2	–	2	–	0	4	–	3	–	1
Oregon State	2	–	3	–	3	3	–	3	–	3
USC	2	–	3	–	2	4	–	4	–	2
Oregon	2	–	5	–	0	4	–	6	–	0
UCLA	1	–	5	–	1	2	–	6	–	1
Montana	0	–	1	–	0	7	–	1	–	0
$ – Conference champion; Rankings from AP Poll

The 1937 Oregon Webfoots football team represented the University of Oregon in the Pacific Coast Conference (PCC) during the 1937 college football season. In their sixth and final season under head coach Prink Callison, the Webfoots compiled a 4–6 record (2–5 in PCC, eighth), and were outscored 158 to 114.

Home games were played on campus at Hayward Field in Eugene and at Multnomah Stadium in Portland.

== Schedule ==
Date	Opponent	Site	Result	Attendance	Source
September 24	at UCLA	Los Angeles Memorial Coliseum; Los Angeles, CA	L 13–26	40,000	
October 2	Stanford	Hayward Field; Eugene, OR	W 7–6	7,500	
October 9	at Gonzaga*	Gonzaga Stadium; Spokane, WA	W 40–6		
October 16	at USC	Los Angeles Memorial Coliseum; Los Angeles, CA	L 14–34	45,000	
October 23	Oregon State	Hayward Field; Eugene, OR (rivalry)	L 0–14	17,000	
November 6	Washington State	Multnomah Stadium; Portland, OR	W 10–6	13,362	
November 13	No. 2 California	Multnomah Stadium; Portland, OR	L 0–26	20,000	
November 20	at Washington	Husky Stadium; Seattle, WA (rivalry)	L 0–14	19,000	
November 27	at San Diego Marines*	City Stadium; San Diego, CA	W 24–6		
December 4	at Arizona*	Arizona Stadium; Tucson, AZ	L 6–20	9,500	
*Non-conference game; Rankings from AP Poll released prior to the game; Source:
