= 1937 USC Trojans football team =

American college football season

1937 USC Trojans football
- Conference: Pacific Coast Conference
- Record: 4–4–2 (2–3–2 PCC)
- Head coach: Howard Jones (13th season)
- Captain: Chuck Williams
- Home stadium: Los Angeles Memorial Coliseum

1937 Pacific Coast Conference football standings
	Conf.					Overall
Team	W		L		T	W		L		T
No. 2 California $	6	–	0	–	1	10	–	0	–	1
Stanford	4	–	2	–	1	4	–	3	–	2
Washington	4	–	2	–	2	7	–	2	–	2
Washington State	3	–	3	–	2	3	–	3	–	3
Idaho	2	–	2	–	0	4	–	3	–	1
Oregon State	2	–	3	–	3	3	–	3	–	3
USC	2	–	3	–	2	4	–	4	–	2
Oregon	2	–	5	–	0	4	–	6	–	0
UCLA	1	–	5	–	1	2	–	6	–	1
Montana	0	–	1	–	0	7	–	1	–	0
$ – Conference champion; Rankings from AP Poll

The 1937 USC Trojans football team represented the University of Southern California (USC) in the 1937 college football season. In their 13th year under head coach Howard Jones, the Trojans compiled a 4–4–2 record (2–3–2 against conference opponents), finished in seventh place in the Pacific Coast Conference, and outscored their opponents by a combined total of 136 to 98.

== Schedule ==
Date	Opponent	Rank	Site	Result	Attendance	Source
September 25	Pacific (CA)*		Los Angeles Memorial Coliseum; Los Angeles, CA	W 40–0	35,000	
October 2	Washington		Los Angeles Memorial Coliseum; Los Angeles, CA	L 0–7	75,000	
October 9	Ohio State*		Los Angeles Memorial Coliseum; Los Angeles, CA	W 13–12	65,000	
October 16	Oregon		Los Angeles Memorial Coliseum; Los Angeles, CA	W 34–14	45,000	
October 23	at No. 1 California	No. 11	California Memorial Stadium; Berkeley, CA	L 6–20	73,000	
October 30	at Washington State		Rogers Field; Pullman, WA	T 0–0	8,700	
November 6	Stanford		Los Angeles Memorial Coliseum; Los Angeles, CA (rivalry)	L 6–7	55,000	
November 13	Oregon State		Los Angeles Memorial Coliseum; Los Angeles, CA	T 12–12	35,000	
November 26	at No. 9 Notre Dame*		Notre Dame Stadium; Notre Dame, IN (rivalry)	L 6–13	35,000–40,000	
December 4	at UCLA^{†}		Los Angeles Memorial Coliseum; Los Angeles, CA (Victory Bell)	W 19–13	70,000	
*Non-conference game; ^{†}Homecoming; Rankings from AP Poll released prior to the game; Source:
