= 1937 California Golden Bears football team =

American college football season

1937 California Golden Bears football

National champion (Dunkel, Helms, Williamson System) PCC champion Rose Bowl champion

Rose Bowl, W 13–0 vs. Alabama
- Conference: Pacific Coast Conference

Ranking
- AP: No. 2
- Record: 10–0–1 (6–0–1 PCC)
- Head coach: Stub Allison (3rd season)
- Offensive scheme: Single-wing
- Home stadium: Memorial Stadium

1937 Pacific Coast Conference football standings
	Conf.					Overall
Team	W		L		T	W		L		T
No. 2 California $	6	–	0	–	1	10	–	0	–	1
Stanford	4	–	2	–	1	4	–	3	–	2
Washington	4	–	2	–	2	7	–	2	–	2
Washington State	3	–	3	–	2	3	–	3	–	3
Idaho	2	–	2	–	0	4	–	3	–	1
Oregon State	2	–	3	–	3	3	–	3	–	3
USC	2	–	3	–	2	4	–	4	–	2
Oregon	2	–	5	–	0	4	–	6	–	0
UCLA	1	–	5	–	1	2	–	6	–	1
Montana	0	–	1	–	0	7	–	1	–	0
$ – Conference champion; Rankings from AP Poll

The 1937 California Golden Bears football team, nicknamed the "Thunder Team", was an American football team that represented the University of California (now known as the University of California, Berkeley) in the Pacific Coast Conference (PCC) during the 1937 college football season. In their third year under head coach Stub Allison, the Bears compiled a 10–0–1 record, shut out seven of eleven opponents, and outscored all opponents by a total of 214 to 33.

In the final AP Poll released on November 29, California was ranked No. 2 with 277 points, 50 points behind No. 1 Pittsburgh. After the final rankings were posted, California shut out No. 4 Alabama in the 1938 Rose Bowl. The Associated Press did not conduct post-bowl polling at the time, but rankings by the Dunkel System, the Williamson System and later the Helms Athletic Foundation selected California as the 1937 national champion.

Three California players received first-team honors on the 1937 All-America college football team: fullback Sam Chapman; guard Vard Stockton; end Perry Schwartz; and center Bob Herwig.

== Schedule ==
Date	Opponent	Rank	Site	Result	Attendance	Source
September 25	Saint Mary's*		California Memorial Stadium; Berkeley, CA	W 30–7	65,000	
October 2	Oregon State		California Memorial Stadium; Berkeley, CA	W 24–6	25,000	
October 9	Washington State		California Memorial Stadium; Berkeley, CA	W 27–0	40,000	
October 16	Pacific (CA)*		California Memorial Stadium; Berkeley, CA	W 20–0	20,000	
October 16	Cal Aggies*		California Memorial Stadium; Berkeley, CA	W 14–0	20,000	
October 23	No. 11 USC	No. 1	California Memorial Stadium; Berkeley, CA	W 20–6	73,000	
October 30	at UCLA	No. 1	Los Angeles Memorial Coliseum; Los Angeles, CA (rivalry)	W 27–14	65,000	
November 6	Washington	No. 1	California Memorial Stadium; Berkeley, CA	T 0–0	60,000	
November 13	at Oregon	No. 2	Multnomah Stadium; Portland, OR	W 26–0	20,000	
November 20	at No. 13 Stanford	No. 2	Stanford Stadium; Stanford, CA (Big Game)	W 13–0	85,000	
January 1, 1938	vs. No. 4 Alabama*	No. 2	Rose Bowl; Pasadena, CA (Rose Bowl)	W 13–0	89,650	
*Non-conference game; Rankings from AP Poll released prior to the game

== Awards and honors ==
Six California players received honors on the 1937 All-America college football team:

- Fullback Sam Chapman was a consensus first-team selection.
- Guard Vard Stockton was a first-team selection by the United Press (UP), International News Service, Newspaper Enterprise Association (NEA), Central Press Association, and North American Newspaper Alliance.
- End Perry Schwartz was a first team selection by the All-America Board and the Walter Camp Football Foundation.
- Center Bob Herwig was a first team selection by Newsweek.
- Halfback Vic Bottari was a second-team selection by the NEA and a third-team selection by the UP.
- Back Johnny "Jelly Belly" Meek was a first-team selection by Collyer's Eye.

Nine were recognized by the Associated Press (AP), International News Service (INS), or UP on the 1937 All-Pacific Coast football team: quarterback Johnny Meek (AP-1, INS-1, UP-1); halfback Sam Chapman (AP-1, INS-1, UP-1); halfback Vic Bottari (AP-1, INS-1, UP-1); fullback D. Anderson (AP-2); end Perry Schwartz (AP-1, INS-1, UP-1); tackle Stoll (UP-2); guard Vard Stockton (AP-1, INS-1, UP-1); guard Evans (AP-2, UP-2); and center Bob Herwig (AP-1, INS-1, UP-1).

Three were also inducted into the College Football Hall of Fame: Herwig (inducted in 1964), Bottari (inducted in 1981), and Chapman (inducted in 1984).

== 1938 NFL draft ==
The following players were claimed in the 1938 NFL draft.

Player	Position	Round	Pick	NFL club
Sam Chapman	Back	3	24	Washington Redskins
John Meek	Back	4	27	Philadelphia Eagles
Bob Herwig	Center	4	30	Chicago Cardinals
Perry Schwartz	End	6	43	Brooklyn Dodgers (NFL)
