= 1937 Hawaii Rainbows football team =

American college football season

1937 Hawaii Rainbows football

Poi Bowl, L 13–53 vs. Washington
- Conference: Independent
- Record: 2–6
- Head coach: Otto Klum (17th season)
- Home stadium: Honolulu Stadium

1937 Western college football independents records
	Conf.			Overall
Team	W	L	T	W		L		T
No. T–9 Santa Clara		–		9	–	0	–	0
San Jose State		–		11	–	2	–	1
Pomona		–		6	–	2	–	1
Humboldt State		–		4	–	2	–	0
Idaho Southern Branch		–		6	–	3	–	0
Cal Poly		–		4	–	2	–	2
Portland		–		4	–	3	–	1
Saint Mary's		–		4	–	3	–	2
San Francisco		–		4	–	5	–	1
Loyola (CA)		–		4	–	7	–	0
Gonzaga		–		2	–	6	–	2
Hawaii		–		2	–	6	–	0
San Francisco State		–		1	–	6	–	1
Rankings from AP Poll

The 1937 Hawaii Rainbows football team represented the University of Hawaiʻi (now known as the University of Hawaiʻi at Mānoa) as an independent during the 1937 college football season. Led by 17th-year head coach Otto Klum, the Rainbows compiled an overall record of 2–6.

== Schedule ==
Date	Opponent	Site	Result	Attendance	Source
October 8	McKinley High School alumni	Honolulu Stadium; Honolulu, Territory of Hawaii	W 21–13	4,500	
October 15	Honolulu Town Team	Honolulu Stadium; Honolulu, Territory of Hawaii	L 7–19	17,000	
October 22	Kamehameha alumni	Honolulu Stadium; Honolulu, Territory of Hawaii	L 6–27	8,000	
November 12	Honolulu Town Team	Honolulu Stadium; Honolulu, Territory of Hawaii	L 7–21		
November 19	Kamehameha alumni	Honolulu Stadium; Honolulu, Territory of Hawaii	L 18–53		
December 4	San Jose State	Honolulu Stadium; Honolulu, Territory of Hawaii (rivalry)	L 6–7	18,500	
December 18	Denver	Honolulu Stadium; Honolulu, Territory of Hawaii	W 7–6	16,000	
January 1, 1938	No. 13 Washington	Honolulu Stadium; Honolulu, Territory of Hawaii (Poi Bowl)	L 13–53	13,500	
Rankings from AP Poll released prior to the game
