= 1937 Tampa Spartans football team =

American college football season

1937 Tampa Spartans football
- Conference: Independent
- Record: 4–5
- Head coach: Nash Higgins (5th season)
- Home stadium: Phillips Field

1937 Southern college football independents records
	Conf.			Overall
Team	W	L	T	W		L		T
Delaware State		–		1	–	0	–	0
Hardin–Simmons		–		8	–	0	–	1
West Virginia		–		8	–	1	–	1
Catholic University		–		5	–	3	–	0
William & Mary Norfolk		–		5	–	3	–	0
Roanoke		–		6	–	4	–	0
Navy		–		4	–	4	–	1
Tampa		–		4	–	5	–	0
George Washington		–		3	–	4	–	1
Georgetown		–		2	–	4	–	2
Western Maryland		–		3	–	6	–	0
East Carolina		–		2	–	5	–	0
Loyola (LA)		–		2	–	6	–	1
Virginia		–		2	–	7	–	0
South Georgia Teachers		–		2	–	9	–	0
Delaware		–		1	–	7	–	0
Oklahoma City		–		1	–	9	–	0
Jacksonville State		–		0	–	5	–	0

The 1937 Tampa Spartans football team represented the University of Tampa as an independent during the 1937 college football season. Led by Nash Higgins in his fifth season as head coach, the Spartans compiled an overall record of 4–5. The team played home games at Phillips Field in Tampa, Florida.

== Schedule ==
Date	Time	Opponent	Site	Result	Attendance	Source
October 4	8:15 p.m.	South Georgia Teachers	Phillips Field; Tampa, FL	W 20–0	5,000	
October 9		at Western Kentucky State Teachers	Bowling Green, KY	L 0–13		
October 15	8:15 p.m.	Stetson	Phillips Field; Tampa, FL	L 12–18	5,000	
October 22		Spring Hill	Phillips Field; Tampa, FL	W 13–0		
October 29		Miami (FL)^{†}	Phillips Field; Tampa, FL	W 12–0	7,000	
November 5		Louisiana Tech	Phillips Field; Tampa, FL	L 13–26	3,000	
November 12		Mercer	Phillips Field; Tampa, FL	L 0–20	2,500	
November 20		at Rollins	Tinker Field; Orlando, FL	L 18–20		
November 29		Mississippi College	Phillips Field; Tampa, FL	W 21–6	4,000	
^{†}Homecoming; All times are in Eastern time
