= 1937 William & Mary Norfolk Division Braves football team =

American college football season

1937 William & Mary Norfolk Division Braves football
- Conference: Independent
- Record: 5–3
- Head coach: Tommy Scott (8th season)

1937 Southern college football independents records
	Conf.			Overall
Team	W	L	T	W		L		T
Delaware State		–		1	–	0	–	0
Hardin–Simmons		–		8	–	0	–	1
West Virginia		–		8	–	1	–	1
Catholic University		–		5	–	3	–	0
William & Mary Norfolk		–		5	–	3	–	0
Roanoke		–		6	–	4	–	0
Navy		–		4	–	4	–	1
George Washington		–		3	–	4	–	1
Georgetown		–		2	–	4	–	2
Western Maryland		–		3	–	6	–	0
East Carolina		–		2	–	5	–	0
Loyola (LA)		–		2	–	6	–	1
Virginia		–		2	–	7	–	0
South Georgia Teachers		–		2	–	9	–	0
Delaware		–		1	–	7	–	0
Oklahoma City		–		1	–	9	–	0
Jacksonville State		–		0	–	5	–	0

The 1937 William & Mary Norfolk Division Braves football team represented the Norfolk Division of the College of William & Mary, now referred to as Old Dominion University, during the 1937 college football season. They finished with a 5–3 record.

== Schedule ==
Date	Opponent	Site	Result
September 24	Apprentice	Newport News, VA	L 0–20
October 1	Richmond freshmen	Norfolk, VA	L 13–14
October 8	Louisburg	Norfolk, VA	W 13–0
October 15	Gallaudet	Norfolk, VA	W 55–6
October 22	Shenandoah	Norfolk, VA	W 26–0
October 29	East Carolina	Norfolk, VA	W 18–6
November 5	William & Mary freshmen	Norfolk, VA	L 6–7
November 19	Norfolk NAS	Norfolk, VA	W 13–0
