= 1937 South Georgia Teachers Blue Tide football team =

American college football season

1937 South Georgia Teachers Blue Tide football
- Conference: Independent
- Record: 2–9
- Head coach: Crook Smith (9th season)

1937 Southern college football independents records
	Conf.			Overall
Team	W	L	T	W		L		T
Delaware State		–		1	–	0	–	0
Hardin–Simmons		–		8	–	0	–	1
West Virginia		–		8	–	1	–	1
Catholic University		–		5	–	3	–	0
William & Mary Norfolk		–		5	–	3	–	0
Roanoke		–		6	–	4	–	0
Navy		–		4	–	4	–	1
Tampa		–		4	–	5	–	0
George Washington		–		3	–	4	–	1
Georgetown		–		2	–	4	–	2
Western Maryland		–		3	–	6	–	0
East Carolina		–		2	–	5	–	0
Loyola (LA)		–		2	–	6	–	1
Virginia		–		2	–	7	–	0
South Georgia Teachers		–		2	–	9	–	0
Delaware		–		1	–	7	–	0
Oklahoma City		–		1	–	9	–	0
Jacksonville State		–		0	–	5	–	0

The 1937 South Georgia Teachers Blue Tide football team represented the South Georgia Teachers College—now known as Georgia Southern University—during the 1937 college football season. The team was led by Crook Smith in his ninth year as head coach.

== Schedule ==
Date	Time	Opponent	Site	Result	Attendance	Source
September 17	8:00 p.m.	at Erskine	Anderson, SC	L 0–46		
September 24	8:30 p.m.	at Mercer	Centennial Stadium; Macon, GA	L 0–77		
October 1	8:30 p.m.	at Miami (FL)	Burdine Stadium; Miami, FL	L 0–40	8,000	
October 4	8:15 p.m.	at Tampa	Phillips Field; Tampa, FL	L 0–20	5,000	
October 8	8:00 p.m.	at Stetson	Hulley Field; Deland, FL	L 0–24		
October 16		Troy State	Statesboro, GA	L 6–12		
October 23	3:00 p.m.	Georgia Military	Statesboro, GA	L 6–7		
October 30		South Georgia State	Statesboro, GA	W 25–6		
November 6	3:00 p.m.	Gordon (GA)	Statesboro, GA	L 0–19		
November 20		at Middle Georgia	Cochran, GA	L 0–7		
November 25		Armstrong	Statesboro, GA	W 20–14		
All times are in Eastern time
