= 1937 VPI Gobblers football team =

American college football season

1937 VPI Gobblers football
- Conference: Southern Conference
- Record: 5–5 (2–4 SoCon)
- Head coach: Henry Redd (6th season)
- Captain: Carol Leo Shockey
- Home stadium: Miles Stadium

1937 Southern Conference football standings
	Conf.					Overall
Team	W		L		T	W		L		T
Maryland $	2	–	0	–	0	8	–	2	–	0
No. 19 North Carolina	4	–	0	–	1	7	–	1	–	1
Clemson	2	–	0	–	1	4	–	4	–	1
No. 20 Duke	5	–	1	–	0	7	–	2	–	1
VMI	4	–	2	–	0	5	–	5	–	0
NC State	4	–	2	–	1	5	–	3	–	1
South Carolina	2	–	2	–	1	5	–	6	–	1
Washington and Lee	2	–	3	–	0	4	–	5	–	0
The Citadel	2	–	3	–	0	7	–	4	–	0
Richmond	2	–	3	–	0	5	–	4	–	1
Furman	1	–	2	–	2	4	–	3	–	2
VPI	2	–	4	–	0	5	–	5	–	0
William & Mary	1	–	3	–	0	4	–	5	–	0
Wake Forest	1	–	4	–	0	3	–	6	–	0
Davidson	1	–	6	–	0	2	–	8	–	0
$ – Conference champion; Rankings from AP Poll

The 1937 VPI Gobblers football team represented Virginia Agricultural and Mechanical College and Polytechnic Institute in the 1937 college football season. The team was led by their head coach Henry Redd and finished with a record of five wins and five losses (5–5).

== Schedule ==
Date	Time	Opponent	Site	Result	Attendance	Source
September 18		Roanoke*	Miles Stadium; Blacksburg, VA	W 27–7	4,000	
September 25	8:00 p.m.	vs. Duke	World War Memorial Stadium; Greensboro, NC	L 0–25	11,000–12,000	
October 2		at Tennessee*	Shields–Watkins Field; Knoxville, TN	L 0–27	10,000	
October 9		vs. William & Mary	City Stadium; Richmond, VA	L 0–12	6,000	
October 16	8:00 p.m.	at NC State	Riddick Stadium; Raleigh, NC	L 7–13	7,000	
October 23		Washington and Lee^{†}	Miles Stadium; Blacksburg, VA	W 19–7	5,000	
October 30		Hampden–Sydney*	Miles Stadium; Blacksburg, VA	W 31–0	3,000	
November 6		at Richmond	City Stadium; Richmond, VA	L 7–12		
November 13	2:10 p.m.	at Virginia*	Scott Stadium; Charlottesville, VA (rivalry)	W 14–7	7,000–7,500	
November 25		vs. VMI	Maher Field; Roanoke, VA (rivalry)	W 12–6	20,000	
*Non-conference game; ^{†}Homecoming; All times are in Eastern time

== Before the season ==
The 1936 VPI Gobblers football team compiled a 5–5 record and were led by Henry Redd in his fifth season as head coach.

== Game summaries ==
=== Roanoke ===
Roanoke at VPI

Team	1	2	3	4	Total
Roanoke	0	7	0	0	7
• VPI	7	7	6	7	27

- Date: September 18, 1937
- Location: Miles Stadium
  Blacksburg, VA
- Game attendance: 4,000
- Game weather: "Ideal"
- Referee: Henry Gerard (Illinois)

VPI's first game of the season was a victory over Roanoke at Miles Stadium.

The starting lineup for VPI was: Pierce (left end), Vecellio (left tackle), Devlin (left guard), Murray (center), Worthington (right guard), Robison (right tackle), Doxey (right end), Shockey (quarterback), Henry (left halfback), Miller (right halfback), Darnell (fullback). The substitutes were: Boswell, Cameron, Cregger, B. Davis, DeMuro, Dunn, King, Mart, Oliver, Pitts and Rountree.

The starting lineup for Roanoke was: Stanley Snidow (left end), Dexter Goodwin (left tackle), Robert Anderson (left guard), Fred Coots (center), Larry Larson (right guard), Victor Cotter (right tackle), Kenneth Moore (right end), Bill Mongiello (quarterback), Perry Crumley (left halfback), Bernard Pedneau (right halfback), Rodney Lester (fullback). The substitutes were: Mack Barnitz, Ed Goodwin, John Higgins, Rip Patrone, Rice, Conley Snidow, Wilson and Sam Yeager.

=== Duke ===
Duke Vs. VPI

Team	1	2	3	4	Total
• Duke	7	6	6	6	25
VPI	0	0	0	0	0

- Date: September 25, 1937
- Location: World War Memorial Stadium
  Greensboro, NC
- Game start: 8:00 p.m.
- Game attendance: 11,000–12,000

After their victory over Roanoke, VPI played Duke University at World War Memorial Stadium in Greensboro, North Carolina.

The starting lineup for VPI was: Pierce (left end), Robison (left tackle), Worthington (left guard), Murray (center), Devlin (right guard), Vecellio (right tackle), Doxey (right end), Shockey (quarterback), Henry (left halfback), Miller (right halfback), Darnell (fullback).

The starting lineup for Duke was: Herbert Hudgins (left end), Joe Brunansky (left tackle), Bolo Perdue (left guard), Dan Hill (center), Buckle Badgett (right guard), Woody Lipscomb (right tackle), Fred Edwards (right end), Elmore Hackney (quarterback), Robert Spangler (left halfback), Eric Tipton (right halfback), Bob O'Mara (fullback). The substitutes were: Blackie Baskerville, Frank Ribar and Hardwood Smith.

=== Tennessee ===
VPI at Tennessee

Team	1	2	3	4	Total
VPI	0	0	0	0	0
• Tenn	7	14	0	6	27

- Date: October 2, 1937
- Location: Shields–Watkins Field
  Knoxville, TN
- Game attendance: 10,000
- Referee: Slutz (Depauw)

The starting lineup for VPI was: Pierce (left end), Davis (left tackle), King (left guard), Murray (center), Devlin (right guard), Robison (right tackle), Doxey (right end), Powers (quarterback), DeMuro (left halfback), Henry (right halfback), Darnell (fullback). The substitutes were: Boswell, Cameron, Dunn, Ellison, Mast, Pitts, Shawhan, William and Worthington.

The starting lineup for Tennessee was: George Hunter (left end), Robert Fulton (left tackle), William Leffler (left guard), Joseph Little (center), Joe Black Hayes (right guard), Boyd Clay (right tackle), Ralph Eldred (right end), William McCarren (quarterback), Walter "Babe" Wood (left halfback), Cheek Duncan (right halfback), Marion Perkins (fullback). The substitutes were: Bacon, William F. Barnes, Sam Bartholomew, George Cafego, Leonard Coffman, Frank Crawford, Disspayne, Fields, Thomas "Red" Harp, Gerald Hendricks, Hereford, Melvin Herring, Bonnie Hodge, Carl Hubbuck, Van Kelley, Samuel Levine, Markey Luttrell, Allen Ramsey, Reno, Alvin Rice, Jim Rike, William Sanders, Robert Sneed, Alfred Thomas, Webber, Bob Woodruff and Bowden Wyatt.

=== William & Mary ===
William & Mary vs. VPI

Team	1	2	3	4	Total
• W&M	6	0	0	6	12
VPI	0	0	0	0	0

- Date: October 9, 1937
- Location: City Stadium
  Richmond, VA
- Game attendance: 6,000
- Referee: Richard Carrington (UVA)

The starting lineup for VPI was: Pierce (left end), Davis (left tackle), Devlin (left guard), Murray (center), Worthington (right guard), Robison (right tackle), Doxey (right end), Mast (quarterback), Henry (left halfback), Shockey (right halfback), Darnell (fullback). The substitutes were: Cameron, Cregger, DeMuro, Dunn, King, Pitt, Powers, Vecellio and Wilson.

The starting lineup for William & Mary was: John Coiner (left end), Samuel Walker (left tackle), Hugh McGowan (left guard), Herbert Krueger (center), John Davidson (right guard), John Dillard (right tackle), Stan Kamen (right end), Otis Bunch (quarterback), Charles Hall (left halfback), Yeager (right halfback), Gus Twiddy (fullback). The substitutes were: Tommy Della Torre, Mike Hook, Elmo Legg and Arthur Tanner.

=== NC State ===
VPI at NC State

Team	1	2	3	4	Total
VPI	0	0	7	0	7
• NC State	7	0	6	0	13

- Date: October 16, 1937
- Location: Riddick Stadium
  Raleigh, NC
- Game start: 8:00 p.m.
- Game attendance: 7,000
- Referee: Ervin (Drake)

The starting lineup for VPI was: Pierce (left end), Davis (left tackle), King (left guard), Murray (center), Worthington (right guard), Robison (right tackle), Cameron (right end), Mast (quarterback), DeMuro (left halfback), Belcher (right halfback), Henry (fullback). The substitutes were: Robison.

The starting lineup for NC State was: Connie Mack Berry (left end), E. V. Helms (left tackle), J. B. Hines (left guard), W. H. Retter (center), Warren Wooden (right guard), George Fry (right tackle), Dick Thompson (right end), George Murphy (quarterback), Artie Rooney (left halfback), Joseph Schwerdt (right halfback), Paul Lozier (fullback). The substitutes were: Eddie Berlinski.

=== Washington and Lee ===
Washington and Lee at VPI

Team	1	2	3	4	Total
W&L	0	7	0	0	7
• VPI	6	0	6	7	19

- Date: October 23, 1937
- Location: Miles Stadium
  Blacksburg, VA
- Game attendance: 5,000
- Game weather: "bitterly cold"
- Referee: Henry Gerard (Illinois)

VPI's 1937 homecoming game was a victory over Washington and Lee.

The starting lineup for VPI was: Pierce (left end), Davis (left tackle), Devlin (left guard), Murray (center), Worthington (right guard), Vecellio (right tackle), Doxey (right end), Cregger (quarterback), Henry (left halfback), DeMuro (right halfback), Belcher (fullback). The substitutes were: Cameron, Darnell, Ellison, King and Robison.

The starting lineup for Washington and Lee was: Bob Spessard (left end), Richard "Dick" Boisseau (left tackle), J. D. Wilson (left guard), William Rogers (center), William Brown (right guard), Joseph Ochsie (right tackle), Charles Lykes (right end), Don Dunlap (quarterback), C. Harrison Hogan (left halfback), R. M. White (right halfback), L. E. Long (fullback). The substitutes were: Raymond Craft, Merton "Chubby" Howard, James Humphrey, R. Shack Parrish and Francis Sugrue.

=== Hampden–Sydney ===
Hampden–Sydney at VPI

Team	1	2	3	4	Total
HS	0	0	0	0	0
• VPI	12	0	6	13	31

- Date: October 30, 1937
- Location: Miles Stadium
  Blacksburg, VA
- Game attendance: 3,000
- Referee: Raymond Dufour (Catholic)

The starting lineup for VPI was: Cameron (left end), Davis (left tackle), King (left guard), Murray (center), Worthington (right guard), Vecellio (right tackle), Willson (right end), Cregger (quarterback), Henry (left halfback), DeMuro (right halfback), Belcher (fullback). The substitutes were: Boswell, Buchanan, Darnell, Devlin, Doxey, Dunn, Futrell, Hamer, McClelland, Montague, Oliver, Pitt, Powers, Robison, Rothrock, Rountree, Shockey, Simpson, Waugh and Wright.

The starting lineup for Hampden–Sydney was: Robert Kincaid (left end), Johnson (left tackle), Sullivan (left guard), Walter "Jack" Pedigo (center), Albert Howard (right guard), Thomas Crume (right tackle), Craft (right end), John Richardson (quarterback), Stuart Walden (left halfback), Williams (right halfback), Charles Spencer (fullback). The substitutes were: James Armistead, Barnes, Batten, Albert Buchinsky, Flannigan, Willie Hall, Frank Hyde, May, Luke McCallion, Harry Null, O'Hair and Sawyers.

=== Richmond ===
VPI at Richmond

Team	1	2	3	4	Total
VPI	0	0	7	0	7
• Richmond	12	0	0	0	12

- Date: November 6, 1937
- Location: City Stadium
  Richmond, VA
- Referee: Richard Carrington (UVA)

The starting lineup for VPI was: Oliver (left end), Davis (left tackle), King (left guard), Murray (center), Worthington (right guard), Vecellio (right tackle), Doxey (right end), Cregger (quarterback), Henry (left halfback), DeMuro (right halfback), Belcher (fullback). The substitutes were: Darnell and Shockey.

The starting lineup for Richmond was: Joseph Straughan (left end), Charles Siddall (left tackle), William Via (left guard), Wilson Faris (center), Forrest Norvell (right guard), William Morrison (right tackle), Avalon Marchant (right end), Len Kielpinski (quarterback), Stuart Hoskins (left halfback), Buddy Lawless (right halfback), Clyde Pendleton (fullback). The substitutes were: Ed Merrick and Ed Sinar.

=== Virginia ===
VPI at Virginia

Team	1	2	3	4	Total
• VPI	0	7	0	7	14
UVA	7	0	0	0	7

- Date: November 13, 1937
- Location: Scott Stadium
  Charlottesville, VA
- Game start: 2:10 p.m.
- Game attendance: 7,000–7,500
- Referee: Thomas Kain

The starting lineup for VPI was: Pierce (left end), Davis (left tackle), King (left guard), Murray (center), Worthington (right guard), Vecellio (right tackle), Doxey (right end), DeMuro (quarterback), Darnell (left halfback), Henry (right halfback), Belcher (fullback). The substitutes were: Shockey.

The starting lineup for Virginia was: James Sargeant (left end), William Weeks (left tackle), Ray Schmidt (left guard), Keilman (center), John Acree (right guard), Arthur Bryant (right tackle), George (right end), Walter Smith (quarterback), Peter Nistad (left halfback), Jim Gillette (right halfback), Harry McClaugherty (fullback). The substitutes were: Harry Dinwiddie.

=== VMI ===
VMI vs. VPI

Team	1	2	3	4	Total
VMI	0	0	0	6	6
• VPI	0	6	0	6	12

- Date: November 25, 1937
- Location: Maher Field
  Roanoke, VA
- Game attendance: 20,000

The starting lineup for VPI was: Pierce (left end), Davis (left tackle), Robison (left guard), Murray (center), Devlin (right guard), Vecellio (right tackle), Doxey (right end), Cregger (quarterback), Henry (left halfback), DeMuro (right halfback), Shockey (fullback).

The starting lineup for VMI was: Ray Brittingham (left end), Richard Strickler (left tackle), Thomas Gray (left guard), Richard Irby (center), William "Red" Echols (right guard), Fieldler (right tackle), E. Ray Taylor (right end), Billy Roberson (quarterback), Vendel "Bud" Kovar (left halfback), Paul Shu (right halfback), Andy Trzeciak (fullback).

== After the season ==
In December 1937, the VPI players chose Frank Pierce as captain of the 1938 VPI Gobblers football team.

== Players ==
=== Roster ===
VPI 1937 roster
James Raymond Belcher; Stephen B. Bogese; Irving Ward Boswell; Billy Boyd; Graham S. Buchanan; Archie Cameron; Joe Carr; Martin Ricks Cobb; Pete Cregger; Weldon Darnell; Junior Davis; Phil DeMuro; W. H. Devlin; Lloyd Doxey; Samuel Bascom Dunn; Mathew Leslie Ellison; Leonard H. Futrell	James Anthony Gaugler; John Alfred Hamer; Mel Henry; Paul Higgins; Wade Hampton Hitt; Woodrow Kantner; E. S. King; Howard Mast; William McClelland; Al Miller; R. P. Murray; Frank Lovitt Oliver; Frank Pierce; David Marion Pitts; Stanley Covington "Sonny" Powers; Arthur Robison; Brick Rothrock	Rochelle Rountree; Daniel Green Shawhan; Carol Shockey (Capt.); Chilton Shorter; Claude Simpson; George Thorpe; Leo Vecellio; Edgar Waugh; Boswell William; Louis Willson; Neil Saunders Wood; Robert Woolwine; Woodrum Woolwine; George Worthington; Thomas Wright; Walter E. Zilahy

=== Varsity letter winners ===
Eighteen players received varsity letters for their participation on the 1937 VPI team.

Player	Hometown	Notes
James Raymond Belcher	Petersburg, Virginia	
Archibald Branks Cameron	Cranford, New Jersey	World War II veteran (Army). Awarded the Silver Star Medal and Purple Heart.
Marvin Andrew "Pete" Cregger	Cripple Creek, Virginia	World War II veteran (Lieutenant Colonel, Army).
Weldon Tolliver "Kinky" Darnell	Winston-Salem, North Carolina	
James Blackwell "Junior" Davis	Fauquier County, Virginia	
Philip Galliano DeMuro	Passaic, New Jersey	
William Harper Devlin	Pittsburgh, Pennsylvania	
Lloyd Gibbs Doxey	Halifax, North Carolina	World War II veteran (Army). Awarded the Bronze Star Medal and Purple Heart.
Melvin Henry	Cumberland, Maryland	
Ernest Stuart King	Disputanta, Virginia	
Howard Dilworth Mast	Lynnhaven, Virginia	World War II veteran (Lieutenant (junior grade), Navy).
Albert Sanford Miller	Hampton, Virginia	
Ruffner Page Murray	Memphis, Tennessee	
Frank Marion Pierce	Suffolk, Virginia	World War II veteran (Lieutenant Colonel, Army).
Arthur Stephen Robison	Richmond, Virginia	World War II veteran (Army).
Carol Leo Shockey (Capt.)	Shockeysville, Virginia	
Leo Arthur Vecellio	Beckley, West Virginia	World War II veteran (Army). Awarded the Legion of Merit.
George Yellott Worthington	Washington, DC	

== Coaching and training staff ==
- Head coach: Henry Redd
- Assistant coaches
  - Backfield coach: Herbert McEver
  - Line coach: Sumner D. Tilson
- Manager: W. B. Wine
- Freshman coaches
  - Freshman head coach: C. E. Tilson
  - Assistant freshman coach and trainer: Thomas A. Slusser
