= 1937 Maryland Terrapins football team =

American college football season

1937 Maryland Terrapins football

SoCon champion
- Conference: Southern Conference
- Record: 8–2 (2–0 SoCon)
- Head coach: Frank Dobson (2nd season)
- Home stadium: Byrd Stadium (original)

1937 Southern Conference football standings
| | Conf. | | | | | Overall |
| Team | W | | L | | T | W | | L | | T |
|---|---|---|---|---|---|---|---|---|---|---|
| Maryland $ | 2 | – | 0 | – | 0 | 8 | – | 2 | – | 0 |
| No. 19 North Carolina | 4 | – | 0 | – | 1 | 7 | – | 1 | – | 1 |
| Clemson | 2 | – | 0 | – | 1 | 4 | – | 4 | – | 1 |
| No. 20 Duke | 5 | – | 1 | – | 0 | 7 | – | 2 | – | 1 |
| VMI | 4 | – | 2 | – | 0 | 5 | – | 5 | – | 0 |
| NC State | 4 | – | 2 | – | 1 | 5 | – | 3 | – | 1 |
| South Carolina | 2 | – | 2 | – | 1 | 5 | – | 6 | – | 1 |
| Washington and Lee | 2 | – | 3 | – | 0 | 4 | – | 5 | – | 0 |
| The Citadel | 2 | – | 3 | – | 0 | 7 | – | 4 | – | 0 |
| Richmond | 2 | – | 3 | – | 0 | 5 | – | 4 | – | 1 |
| Furman | 1 | – | 2 | – | 2 | 4 | – | 3 | – | 2 |
| VPI | 2 | – | 4 | – | 0 | 5 | – | 5 | – | 0 |
| William & Mary | 1 | – | 3 | – | 0 | 4 | – | 5 | – | 0 |
| Wake Forest | 1 | – | 4 | – | 0 | 3 | – | 6 | – | 0 |
| Davidson | 1 | – | 6 | – | 0 | 2 | – | 8 | – | 0 |
$ – Conference champion; Rankings from AP Poll

The 1937 Maryland Terrapins football team represented the University of Maryland during the 1937 college football season as a member of the Southern Conference. The highlight of the season was a 13–0 shutout of 17th-ranked Syracuse. In the homecoming game, Charlie Weidinger completed a pass to William Bryant for a 13–7 go-ahead over Florida. The Terrapins' two losses came against Penn and Penn State, the latter being the second game in a rivalry that would bedevil Maryland throughout its entire duration. At the end of the season, Maryland was declared the Southern Conference champions, the team's first major conference title.

== Schedule ==
| Date | Opponent | Site | Result | Attendance | Source |
|---|---|---|---|---|---|
| September 25 | St. John's (MD)* | Byrd Stadium; College Park, MD | W 25–0 | | |
| October 2 | at Penn* | Franklin Field; Philadelphia, PA | L 21–28 | 30,000 | |
| October 9 | Western Maryland* | Byrd Stadium; College Park, MD | W 6–0 | 7,000 | |
| October 16 | at Virginia* | Scott Stadium; Charlottesville, VA (rivalry) | W 3–0 | 6,000 | |
| October 23 | vs. No. 17 Syracuse* | Municipal Stadium; Baltimore, MD | W 13–0 | 10,000 | |
| October 30 | Florida* | Byrd Stadium; College Park, MD | W 13–7 | 10,000 | |
| November 6 | at VMI | Alumni Field; Lexington, VA | W 9–7 | 5,000 | |
| November 13 | at Penn State* | New Beaver Field; State College, PA (rivalry) | L 14–21 | 7,535 | |
| November 20 | at Georgetown* | Griffith Stadium; Washington, DC | W 12–2 | 22,000 | |
| November 25 | vs. Washington and Lee | Municipal Stadium; Baltimore, MD | W 8–0 | 9,600 | |
*Non-conference game; Rankings from AP Poll released prior to the game

== Syracuse game and Wilmeth Sidat-Singh ==
Syracuse and nearby Cornell were among the first collegiate football teams to include African-American players as starting backfield players. Wilmeth Sidat-Singh, starred for Syracuse, playing a position equivalent to modern-day quarterback.

In that era, when games were played in Southern segregation states, African-American players from Northern schools were banned from the field. Because of his light complexion and name, Sidat-Singh was sometimes assumed to be a "Hindu" (as people from India were often called by Americans during this time). However. shortly before a game against Maryland, a black sportswriter, Sam Lacy, wrote an article in the Baltimore Afro-American, revealing Sidat-Singh's was African-American. Maryland refused to let him play and he was held out of the game and Syracuse lost the game 0–13. In a rematch the following year at Syracuse, Sidat-Singh led the Orange to a lopsided victory (53-0) over Maryland.

On Saturday, Nov. 9, 2013, the University of Maryland publicly apologized to surviving relatives at a ceremony during a football game at Syracuse.
