= 1937 Wake Forest Demon Deacons football team =

American college football season

1937 Wake Forest Demon Deacons football
- Conference: Southern Conference
- Record: 3–6 (1–4 SoCon)
- Head coach: Peahead Walker (1st season)
- Captain: A. M. Munford
- Home stadium: Gore Field

1937 Southern Conference football standings
	Conf.					Overall
Team	W		L		T	W		L		T
Maryland $	2	–	0	–	0	8	–	2	–	0
No. 19 North Carolina	4	–	0	–	1	7	–	1	–	1
Clemson	2	–	0	–	1	4	–	4	–	1
No. 20 Duke	5	–	1	–	0	7	–	2	–	1
VMI	4	–	2	–	0	5	–	5	–	0
NC State	4	–	2	–	1	5	–	3	–	1
South Carolina	2	–	2	–	1	5	–	6	–	1
Washington and Lee	2	–	3	–	0	4	–	5	–	0
The Citadel	2	–	3	–	0	7	–	4	–	0
Richmond	2	–	3	–	0	5	–	4	–	1
Furman	1	–	2	–	2	4	–	3	–	2
VPI	2	–	4	–	0	5	–	5	–	0
William & Mary	1	–	3	–	0	4	–	5	–	0
Wake Forest	1	–	4	–	0	3	–	6	–	0
Davidson	1	–	6	–	0	2	–	8	–	0
$ – Conference champion; Rankings from AP Poll

The 1937 Wake Forest Demon Deacons football team was an American football team that represented Wake Forest University during the 1937 college football season. In its first season under head coach Peahead Walker, the team compiled a 3–6 record and finished in 14th place in the Southern Conference.

== Schedule ==
Date	Opponent	Site	Result	Attendance	Source
September 25	at Tennessee*	Shields–Watkins Field; Knoxville, TN	L 0–32	7,500	
October 1	at George Washington*	Griffith Stadium; Washington DC	L 6–34	15,000	
October 8	Erskine*	Gore Field; Wake Forest, NC	W 19–0	4,000	
October 16	North Carolina	Gore Field; Wake Forest, NC (rivalry)	L 0–28	10,000	
October 23	NC State	Gore Field; Wake Forest, NC (rivalry)	L 0–20	6,000	
October 30	at Clemson	Riggs Field; Clemson, SC	L 0–32	4,000	
November 6	at No. 11 Duke	Duke Stadium; Durham, NC (rivalry)	L 0–67	6,000	
November 12	at Wofford*	Snyder Field; Spartanburg, SC	W 24–0	1,000	
November 25	vs. Davidson	American Legion Memorial Stadium; Charlotte, NC	W 19–7	10,000	
*Non-conference game; Rankings from AP Poll released prior to the game
