= 1937 Furman Purple Hurricane football team =

American college football season

1937 Furman Purple Hurricane football
- Conference: Southern Conference
- Record: 4–3–2 (1–2–2 SoCon)
- Head coach: Dizzy McLeod (6th season)
- Captains: June Scott; Jack Shivers
- Home stadium: Sirrine Stadium

1937 Southern Conference football standings
	Conf.					Overall
Team	W		L		T	W		L		T
Maryland $	2	–	0	–	0	8	–	2	–	0
No. 19 North Carolina	4	–	0	–	1	7	–	1	–	1
Clemson	2	–	0	–	1	4	–	4	–	1
No. 20 Duke	5	–	1	–	0	7	–	2	–	1
VMI	4	–	2	–	0	5	–	5	–	0
NC State	4	–	2	–	1	5	–	3	–	1
South Carolina	2	–	2	–	1	5	–	6	–	1
Washington and Lee	2	–	3	–	0	4	–	5	–	0
The Citadel	2	–	3	–	0	7	–	4	–	0
Richmond	2	–	3	–	0	5	–	4	–	1
Furman	1	–	2	–	2	4	–	3	–	2
VPI	2	–	4	–	0	5	–	5	–	0
William & Mary	1	–	3	–	0	4	–	5	–	0
Wake Forest	1	–	4	–	0	3	–	6	–	0
Davidson	1	–	6	–	0	2	–	8	–	0
$ – Conference champion; Rankings from AP Poll

The 1937 Furman Purple Hurricane football team was an American football team that represented Furman University as a member of the Southern Conference (SoCon) during the 1937 college football season. In their sixth year under head coach Dizzy McLeod, the Purple Hurricane compiled an overall record of 4–3–2 with a conference mark of 1–2–2, and finished eleventh in the SoCon.

== Schedule ==
Date	Opponent	Site	Result	Attendance	Source
September 17	Newberry*	Sirrine Stadium; Greenville, SC	W 19–0	9,000	
October 1	Wofford*	Sirrine Stadium; Greenville, SC (rivalry)	W 58–0	4,500	
October 9	NC State	Sirrine Stadium; Greenville, SC	T 7–7	9,000	
October 16	at The Citadel	Johnson Hagood Stadium; Charleston, SC (rivalry)	L 0–8		
October 23	Presbyterian*	Sirrine Stadium; Greenville, SC	W 52–0		
October 30	at Davidson	Richardson Field; Davidson, NC	L 9–13	4,500	
November 6	Bucknell*	Sirrine Stadium; Greenville, SC	L 7–20	5,000	
November 13	at South Carolina	Carolina Municipal Stadium; Columbia, SC	W 12–0	7,000	
November 25	Clemson	Sirrine Stadium; Greenville, SC	T 0–0	18,000	
*Non-conference game
