= 1937 Duke Blue Devils football team =

American college football season

1937 Duke Blue Devils football

SoCon champion
- Conference: Southern Conference

Ranking
- AP: No. 20
- Record: 7–2–1 (5–1 SoCon)
- Head coach: Wallace Wade (7th season)
- Offensive scheme: Single-wing
- MVP: Elmore Hackney
- Captain: Woodrow Lipscomb
- Home stadium: Duke Stadium

1937 Southern Conference football standings
	Conf.					Overall
Team	W		L		T	W		L		T
Maryland $	2	–	0	–	0	8	–	2	–	0
No. 19 North Carolina	4	–	0	–	1	7	–	1	–	1
Clemson	2	–	0	–	1	4	–	4	–	1
No. 20 Duke	5	–	1	–	0	7	–	2	–	1
VMI	4	–	2	–	0	5	–	5	–	0
NC State	4	–	2	–	1	5	–	3	–	1
South Carolina	2	–	2	–	1	5	–	6	–	1
Washington and Lee	2	–	3	–	0	4	–	5	–	0
The Citadel	2	–	3	–	0	7	–	4	–	0
Richmond	2	–	3	–	0	5	–	4	–	1
Furman	1	–	2	–	2	4	–	3	–	2
VPI	2	–	4	–	0	5	–	5	–	0
William & Mary	1	–	3	–	0	4	–	5	–	0
Wake Forest	1	–	4	–	0	3	–	6	–	0
Davidson	1	–	6	–	0	2	–	8	–	0
$ – Conference champion; Rankings from AP Poll

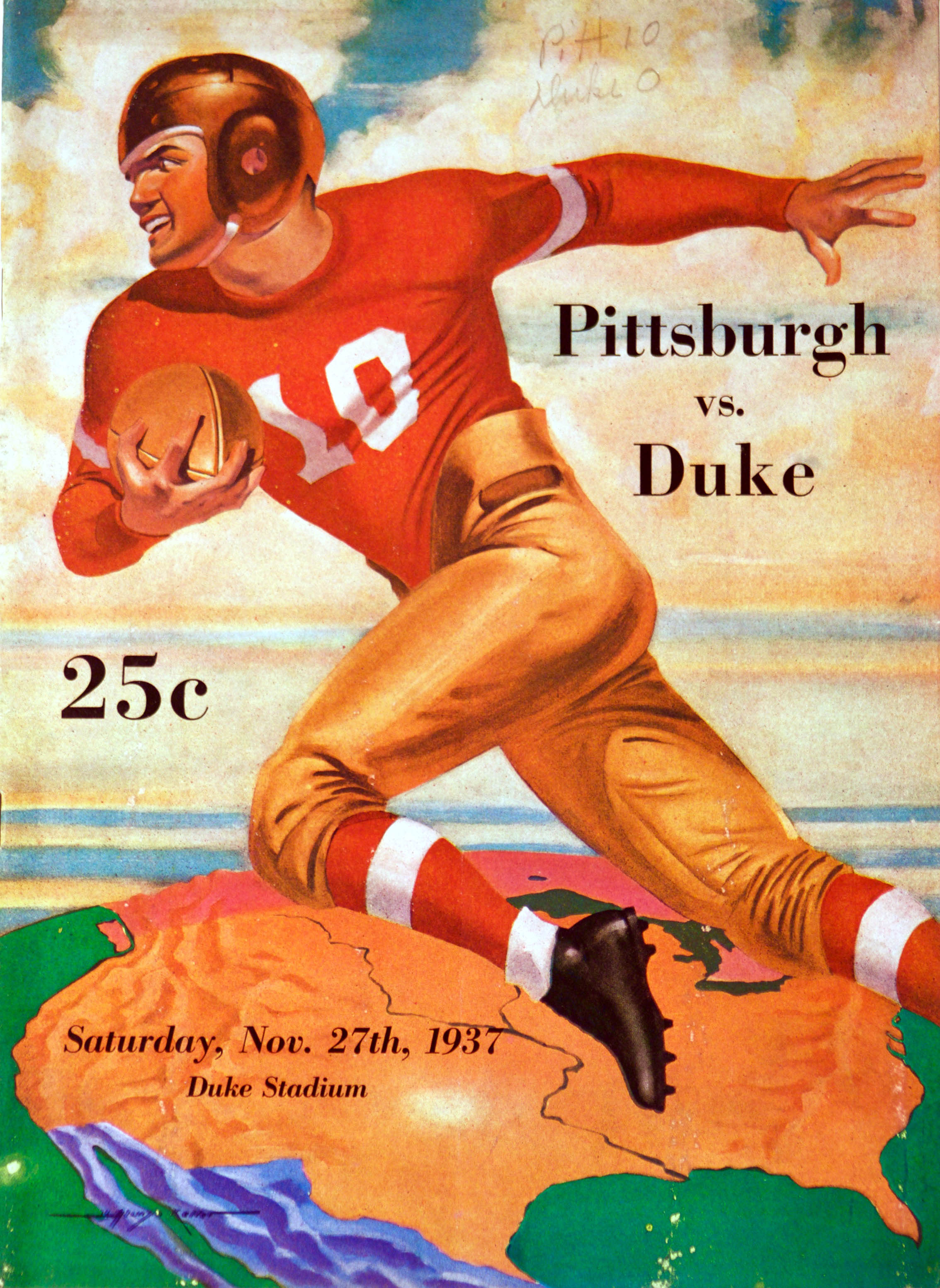
November 27, 1937 Official Football Program for the Duke versus Pittsburgh game

The 1937 Duke Blue Devils football team was an American football team that represented Duke University as a member of the Southern Conference during the 1937 college football season. In its seventh season under head coach Wallace Wade, the team compiled a 7–2–1 record (5–1 against conference opponents), was ranked No. 20 in the final AP Poll, and outscored opponents by a total of 228 to 56. Woodrow Lipscomb was the team captain. The team played its home games at Duke Stadium in Durham, North Carolina.

== Schedule ==
Date	Time	Opponent	Rank	Site	Result	Attendance	Source
September 25	8:00 p.m.	vs. VPI		World War Memorial Stadium; Greensboro, NC	W 25–0	11,000	
October 2		at Davidson		Richardson Field; Davidson, NC	W 34–6	8,500	
October 9		Tennessee^{†}		Duke Stadium; Durham, NC	T 0–0	39,000	
October 16		at Georgia Tech		Grant Field; Atlanta, GA	W 20–19	26,000	
October 23		at Colgate	No. 10	Whitnall Field; Hamilton, NY	W 13–0	10,000	
October 30		vs. Washington and Lee	No. 13	City Stadium; Richmond, VA	W 43–0		
November 6		Wake Forest	No. 11	Duke Stadium; Durham, NC (rivalry)	W 67–0	6,000	
November 13		North Carolina	No. 8	Duke Stadium; Durham, NC (rivalry)	L 6–14	43,000	
November 20		at NC State		Riddick Stadium; Raleigh, NC (rivalry)	W 20–7	10,000	
November 27		No. 1 Pittsburgh	No. 18	Duke Stadium; Durham, NC	L 0–10	40,000	
^{†}Homecoming; Rankings from AP Poll released prior to the game
