= 1937 South Carolina Gamecocks football team =

American college football season

1937 South Carolina Gamecocks football
- Conference: Southern Conference
- Record: 5–6–1 (2–2–1 SoCon)
- Head coach: Don McCallister (3rd season)
- Captain: Jack Lyons
- Home stadium: Carolina Municipal Stadium

1937 Southern Conference football standings
	Conf.					Overall
Team	W		L		T	W		L		T
Maryland $	2	–	0	–	0	8	–	2	–	0
No. 19 North Carolina	4	–	0	–	1	7	–	1	–	1
Clemson	2	–	0	–	1	4	–	4	–	1
No. 20 Duke	5	–	1	–	0	7	–	2	–	1
VMI	4	–	2	–	0	5	–	5	–	0
NC State	4	–	2	–	1	5	–	3	–	1
South Carolina	2	–	2	–	1	5	–	6	–	1
Washington and Lee	2	–	3	–	0	4	–	5	–	0
The Citadel	2	–	3	–	0	7	–	4	–	0
Richmond	2	–	3	–	0	5	–	4	–	1
Furman	1	–	2	–	2	4	–	3	–	2
VPI	2	–	4	–	0	5	–	5	–	0
William & Mary	1	–	3	–	0	4	–	5	–	0
Wake Forest	1	–	4	–	0	3	–	6	–	0
Davidson	1	–	6	–	0	2	–	8	–	0
$ – Conference champion; Rankings from AP Poll

The 1937 South Carolina Gamecocks football team was an American football team that represented the University of South Carolina as a member of the Southern Conference (SoCon) during the 1937 college football season. In their third and final season under head coach Don McCallister, the Gamecocks compiled an overall record of 5–6–1 with a mark of 2–2–1 in conference play, placing seventh in the SoCon.

== Schedule ==
Date	Opponent	Site	Result	Attendance	Source
September 18	Emory and Henry*	Carolina Municipal Stadium; Columbia, SC	W 45–7	9,000	
September 25	at North Carolina	Kenan Memorial Stadium; Chapel Hill, NC (rivalry)	T 13–13	14,000	
October 2	Georgia*	Columbia Municipal Stadium; Columbia, SC (rivalry)	L 7–13	15,000	
October 9	at Alabama*	Denny Stadium; Tuscaloosa, AL	L 0–20	9,000	
October 16	Davidson	Carolina Municipal Stadium; Columbia, SC	W 12–7	8,000	
October 21	Clemson	Carolina Municipal Stadium; Columbia, SC (rivalry)	L 6–34	20,000	
October 29	vs. The Citadel	County Fairgrounds; Orangeburg, SC	W 21–6	8,000	
November 6	at Kentucky*	McLean Stadium; Lexington, KY	L 7–27		
November 13	Furman	Columbia Municipal Stadium; Columbia, SC	L 0–12	7,000	
November 20	Presbyterian*	Columbia Municipal Stadium; Columbia, SC	W 64–0	3,500	
November 25	at Catholic University*	Brookland Stadium; Washington, DC	L 14–27		
December 3	at Miami (FL)*	Burdine Stadium; Miami, FL	W 3–0	7.543	
*Non-conference game
