= 1937 NC State Wolfpack football team =

American college football season

1937 NC State Wolfpack football
- Conference: Southern Conference
- Record: 5–3–1 (4–2–1 SoCon)
- Head coach: Williams Newton (1st season)
- Home stadium: Riddick Stadium

1937 Southern Conference football standings
	Conf.					Overall
Team	W		L		T	W		L		T
Maryland $	2	–	0	–	0	8	–	2	–	0
No. 19 North Carolina	4	–	0	–	1	7	–	1	–	1
Clemson	2	–	0	–	1	4	–	4	–	1
No. 20 Duke	5	–	1	–	0	7	–	2	–	1
VMI	4	–	2	–	0	5	–	5	–	0
NC State	4	–	2	–	1	5	–	3	–	1
South Carolina	2	–	2	–	1	5	–	6	–	1
Washington and Lee	2	–	3	–	0	4	–	5	–	0
The Citadel	2	–	3	–	0	7	–	4	–	0
Richmond	2	–	3	–	0	5	–	4	–	1
Furman	1	–	2	–	2	4	–	3	–	2
VPI	2	–	4	–	0	5	–	5	–	0
William & Mary	1	–	3	–	0	4	–	5	–	0
Wake Forest	1	–	4	–	0	3	–	6	–	0
Davidson	1	–	6	–	0	2	–	8	–	0
$ – Conference champion; Rankings from AP Poll

The 1937 NC State Wolfpack football team was an American football team that represented North Carolina State University as a member of the Southern Conference (SoCon) during the 1937 college football season. In its first season under head coach Williams Newton, the team compiled a 5–3–1 record (4–2–1 against SoCon opponents) and was outscored by a total of 92 to 91.

== Schedule ==
Date	Time	Opponent	Site	Result	Attendance	Source
September 18		vs. Davidson	World War Memorial Stadium; Greensboro, NC	W 6–2	14,000	
October 2		North Carolina	Riddick Stadium; Raleigh, NC (rivalry)	L 0–20	16,000	
October 9		at Furman	Sirrine Stadium; Greenville, SC	T 7–7	9,000	
October 16		VPI	Riddick Stadium; Raleigh, NC	W 13–7	7,000	
October 23		at Wake Forest	Gore Field; Wake Forest, NC (rivalry)	W 20–0	6,000	
October 30	2:00 p.m.	at Boston College*	Alumni Field; Chestnut Hill, MA	W 12–7	12,000	
November 6		The Citadel	Riddick Stadium; Raleigh, NC	W 26–14	7,000	
November 13		at Manhattan	Ebbets Field; Brooklyn, NY	L 0–15	3,500	
November 20		Duke	Riddick Stadium; Raleigh, NC (rivalry)	L 7–20	10,000	
*Non-conference game; All times are in Eastern time
