= 1937 Clemson Tigers football team =

American college football season

1937 Clemson Tigers football
- Conference: Southern Conference
- Record: 4–4–1 (2–0–1 SoCon)
- Head coach: Jess Neely (7th season)
- Captain: H. D. Lewis
- Home stadium: Riggs Field

1937 Southern Conference football standings
	Conf.					Overall
Team	W		L		T	W		L		T
Maryland $	2	–	0	–	0	8	–	2	–	0
No. 19 North Carolina	4	–	0	–	1	7	–	1	–	1
Clemson	2	–	0	–	1	4	–	4	–	1
No. 20 Duke	5	–	1	–	0	7	–	2	–	1
VMI	4	–	2	–	0	5	–	5	–	0
NC State	4	–	2	–	1	5	–	3	–	1
South Carolina	2	–	2	–	1	5	–	6	–	1
Washington and Lee	2	–	3	–	0	4	–	5	–	0
The Citadel	2	–	3	–	0	7	–	4	–	0
Richmond	2	–	3	–	0	5	–	4	–	1
Furman	1	–	2	–	2	4	–	3	–	2
VPI	2	–	4	–	0	5	–	5	–	0
William & Mary	1	–	3	–	0	4	–	5	–	0
Wake Forest	1	–	4	–	0	3	–	6	–	0
Davidson	1	–	6	–	0	2	–	8	–	0
$ – Conference champion; Rankings from AP Poll

The 1937 Clemson Tigers football team was an American football team that represented Clemson College in the Southern Conference during the 1937 college football season. In their seventh season under head coach Jess Neely, the Tigers compiled a 4–4–1 record (2–0–1 against conference opponents), finished third in the conference, and outscored opponents by a total of 128 to 64.

Red Sharpe was the team captain. The team's statistical leaders included tailback Bob Bailey with 579 passing yards, fullback Don Willis with 329 rushing yards, and back Red Pearson with 29 points scored (3 touchdowns, 1 field goal, 8 extra points).

H.D. Lewis was the team captain. Two Clemson players were selected as first-team players on the 1937 All-Southern Conference football team: center Charlie Woods and tailback Bob Bailey.

== Schedule ==
Date	Opponent	Site	Result	Attendance	Source
September 18	Presbyterian*	Riggs Field; Clemson, SC	W 46–0		
September 25	at Tulane*	Tulane Stadium; New Orleans, LA	L 0–7	15,000	
October 2	at Army*	Michie Stadium; West Point, NY	L 6–21	10,000	
October 9	at Georgia*	Sanford Stadium; Athens, GA (rivalry)	L 0–14	8,000	
October 21	at South Carolina	Fair Grounds Stadium; Columbia, SC (rivalry)	W 34–6	20,000	
October 30	Wake Forest	Riggs Field; Clemson, SC	W 32–0	4,000	
November 6	at Georgia Tech*	Grant Field; Atlanta, GA (rivalry)	L 0–7	12,000	
November 13	at Florida*	Florida Field; Gainesville, FL	W 10–9	6,000	
November 25	at Furman	Sirrine Stadium; Greenville, SC	T 0–0	18,000	
*Non-conference game
