= 1937 VMI Keydets football team =

American college football season

1937 VMI Keydets football
- Conference: Southern Conference
- Record: 5–5 (4–2 SoCon)
- Head coach: Pooley Hubert (1st season)
- Home stadium: Alumni Field

1937 Southern Conference football standings
	Conf.					Overall
Team	W		L		T	W		L		T
Maryland $	2	–	0	–	0	8	–	2	–	0
No. 19 North Carolina	4	–	0	–	1	7	–	1	–	1
Clemson	2	–	0	–	1	4	–	4	–	1
No. 20 Duke	5	–	1	–	0	7	–	2	–	1
VMI	4	–	2	–	0	5	–	5	–	0
NC State	4	–	2	–	1	5	–	3	–	1
South Carolina	2	–	2	–	1	5	–	6	–	1
Washington and Lee	2	–	3	–	0	4	–	5	–	0
The Citadel	2	–	3	–	0	7	–	4	–	0
Richmond	2	–	3	–	0	5	–	4	–	1
Furman	1	–	2	–	2	4	–	3	–	2
VPI	2	–	4	–	0	5	–	5	–	0
William & Mary	1	–	3	–	0	4	–	5	–	0
Wake Forest	1	–	4	–	0	3	–	6	–	0
Davidson	1	–	6	–	0	2	–	8	–	0
$ – Conference champion; Rankings from AP Poll

The 1937 VMI Keydets football team was an American football team that represented the Virginia Military Institute (VMI) during the 1937 college football season as a member of the Southern Conference. In their first year under head coach Pooley Hubert, the team compiled an overall record of 5–5.

== Schedule ==
Date	Opponent	Site	Result	Attendance	Source
September 18	Elon*	Alumni Field; Lexington, VA	L 6–12	2,500	
September 24	at Temple*	Temple Stadium; Philadelphia, PA	L 7–18	15,000	
October 2	vs. William & Mary	Foreman Field; Norfolk, VA (rivalry)	W 20–9	5,000	
October 9	Davidson	Alumni Field; Lexington, VA	W 7–0	2,500	
October 16	at Richmond	City Stadium; Richmond, VA (rivalry)	W 21–7	11,000	
October 23	at Virginia*	Scott Stadium; Charlottesville, VA	W 26–7	10,000	
October 30	at Army*	Michie Stadium; West Point, NY	L 7–20	27,000	
November 6	Maryland	Alumni Field; Lexington, VA	L 7–9	5,000	
November 13	The Citadel	Alumni Field; Lexington, VA (rivalry)	W 27–0	1,500	
November 25	vs. VPI	Maher Field; Roanoke, VA (rivalry)	L 6–12	20,000	
*Non-conference game
