= 1937 Washington and Lee Generals football team =

American college football season

1937 Washington and Lee Generals football
- Conference: Southern Conference
- Record: 4–5 (2–3 SoCon)
- Head coach: Warren E. Tilson (5th season)
- Home stadium: Wilson Field

1937 Southern Conference football standings
	Conf.					Overall
Team	W		L		T	W		L		T
Maryland $	2	–	0	–	0	8	–	2	–	0
No. 19 North Carolina	4	–	0	–	1	7	–	1	–	1
Clemson	2	–	0	–	1	4	–	4	–	1
No. 20 Duke	5	–	1	–	0	7	–	2	–	1
VMI	4	–	2	–	0	5	–	5	–	0
NC State	4	–	2	–	1	5	–	3	–	1
South Carolina	2	–	2	–	1	5	–	6	–	1
Washington and Lee	2	–	3	–	0	4	–	5	–	0
The Citadel	2	–	3	–	0	7	–	4	–	0
Richmond	2	–	3	–	0	5	–	4	–	1
Furman	1	–	2	–	2	4	–	3	–	2
VPI	2	–	4	–	0	5	–	5	–	0
William & Mary	1	–	3	–	0	4	–	5	–	0
Wake Forest	1	–	4	–	0	3	–	6	–	0
Davidson	1	–	6	–	0	2	–	8	–	0
$ – Conference champion; Rankings from AP Poll

The 1937 Washington and Lee Generals football team was an American football team that represented Washington and Lee University during the 1937 college football season as a member of the Southern Conference. In their fifth year under head coach Warren E. Tilson, the team compiled an overall record of 4–5, with a mark of 2–3 in conference play.

== Schedule ==
Date	Opponent	Site	Result	Attendance	Source
September 25	Wofford*	Wilson Field; Lexington, VA	W 20–0		
October 2	Richmond	Wilson Field; Lexington, VA	W 6–0		
October 9	vs. West Virginia*	Laidley Field; Charleston, WV	L 0–6	4,500	
October 16	at Kentucky*	Stoll Field; Lexington, KY	L 6–41		
October 23	at VPI	Miles Stadium; Blacksburg, VA	L 7–19	5,000	
October 30	vs. No. 13 Duke	City Stadium; Richmond, VA	L 0–43		
November 6	Virginia*	Wilson Field; Lexington, VA	W 13–7		
November 13	at William & Mary	Cary Field; Williamsburg, VA	W 14–12		
November 25	at Maryland	Municipal Stadium; Baltimore, MD	L 0–8	9,600	
*Non-conference game; Rankings from AP Poll released prior to the game
