= Tatum Gressette =

American college athletics coach and administrator

Biographical details
- Born: March 22, 1900
- Died: July 19, 1997 (aged 97)

Playing career

Football
- 1920–1921: South Carolina

Coaching career (HC unless noted)

Football
- 1932–1939: The Citadel

Baseball
- 1932–1939: The Citadel

Administrative career (AD unless noted)
- 1932–1939: The Citadel

Head coaching record
- Overall: 34–41–3 (football)
- Tournaments: Football; 1 SIAA (1936)

Tatum Wannamaker Gressette Sr. (March 22, 1900 – July 19, 1997) was an American football and baseball coach and college athletics administrator. He was the ninth head football coach at The Citadel, serving for eight seasons, from 1932 to 1939, and compiling a record of 34–41–3.

== Head coaching record ==
=== Football ===
Year	Team	Overall	Conference	Standing	Bowl/playoffs
The Citadel Bulldogs (Southern Intercollegiate Athletic Association) (1932–1934)
1932	The Citadel	4–5	2–2	T–14th	
1933	The Citadel	3–5–1	2–2–1	T–14th	
1934	The Citadel	3–5–1	3–1	T–8th	
1935	The Citadel	4–3–1	4–1	T–9th	
The Citadel Bulldogs (Southern Conference / Southern Intercollegiate Athletic Association) (1936)
1936	The Citadel	4–6 /	0–4 / 4–0	14th / T–1st	
The Citadel Bulldogs (Southern Conference) (1937–1939)
1937	The Citadel	7–4	2–3	8th	
1938	The Citadel	6–5	2–3	10th	
1939	The Citadel	3–8	0–4	15th	
The Citadel:		34–41–3	19–22–1		
Total:		34–41–3			
National championship Conference title Conference division title or championship game berth
