= 1937 The Citadel Bulldogs football team =

American college football season

1937 The Citadel Bulldogs football
- Conference: Southern Conference
- Record: 7–4 (2–3 SoCon)
- Head coach: Tatum Gressette (6th season)
- Home stadium: Johnson Hagood Stadium

1937 Southern Conference football standings
	Conf.					Overall
Team	W		L		T	W		L		T
Maryland $	2	–	0	–	0	8	–	2	–	0
No. 19 North Carolina	4	–	0	–	1	7	–	1	–	1
Clemson	2	–	0	–	1	4	–	4	–	1
No. 20 Duke	5	–	1	–	0	7	–	2	–	1
VMI	4	–	2	–	0	5	–	5	–	0
NC State	4	–	2	–	1	5	–	3	–	1
South Carolina	2	–	2	–	1	5	–	6	–	1
Washington and Lee	2	–	3	–	0	4	–	5	–	0
The Citadel	2	–	3	–	0	7	–	4	–	0
Richmond	2	–	3	–	0	5	–	4	–	1
Furman	1	–	2	–	2	4	–	3	–	2
VPI	2	–	4	–	0	5	–	5	–	0
William & Mary	1	–	3	–	0	4	–	5	–	0
Wake Forest	1	–	4	–	0	3	–	6	–	0
Davidson	1	–	6	–	0	2	–	8	–	0
$ – Conference champion; Rankings from AP Poll

The 1937 The Citadel Bulldogs football team represented The Citadel, The Military College of South Carolina in the 1937 college football season. Tatum Gressette served as head coach for the sixth season. The Bulldogs played as members of the Southern Conference and played home games at Johnson Hagood Stadium.

== Schedule ==
Date	Opponent	Site	Result	Attendance	Source
September 18	at Wofford*	Snyder Field; Spartanburg, SC (rivalry)	W 38–0		
September 25	Newberry*	Johnson Hagood Stadium; Charleston, SC	W 35–0		
October 2	at Navy*	Thompson Stadium; Annapolis, MD	L 0–32	15,000	
October 8	at Presbyterian*	Bailey Stadium; Clinton, SC	W 19–0		
October 16	Furman	Johnson Hagood Stadium; Charleston, SC (rivalry)	W 8–0		
October 22	Richmond	Johnson Hagood Stadium; Charleston, SC	W 26–0		
October 29	vs. South Carolina	County Fairgrounds; Orangeburg, SC	L 6–21	8,000	
November 6	at NC State	Riddick Stadium; Raleigh, NC	L 14–26	7,000	
November 13	at VMI	Alumni Field; Lexington, VA (rivalry)	L 0–27	1,500	
November 20	Erskine*	Johnson Hagood Stadium; Charleston, SC	W 46–7	3,500	
November 27	Oglethorpe*	Johnson Hagood Stadium; Charleston, SC	W 7–6		
*Non-conference game
