= 1937 North Carolina Tar Heels football team =

American college football season

1937 North Carolina Tar Heels football
- Conference: Southern Conference

Ranking
- AP: No. 19
- Record: 7–1–1 (4–0–1 SoCon)
- Head coach: Raymond Wolf (2nd season)
- Captains: Andy Bershak; Crowell Little
- Home stadium: Kenan Memorial Stadium

1937 Southern Conference football standings
	Conf.					Overall
Team	W		L		T	W		L		T
Maryland $	2	–	0	–	0	8	–	2	–	0
No. 19 North Carolina	4	–	0	–	1	7	–	1	–	1
Clemson	2	–	0	–	1	4	–	4	–	1
No. 20 Duke	5	–	1	–	0	7	–	2	–	1
VMI	4	–	2	–	0	5	–	5	–	0
NC State	4	–	2	–	1	5	–	3	–	1
South Carolina	2	–	2	–	1	5	–	6	–	1
Washington and Lee	2	–	3	–	0	4	–	5	–	0
The Citadel	2	–	3	–	0	7	–	4	–	0
Richmond	2	–	3	–	0	5	–	4	–	1
Furman	1	–	2	–	2	4	–	3	–	2
VPI	2	–	4	–	0	5	–	5	–	0
William & Mary	1	–	3	–	0	4	–	5	–	0
Wake Forest	1	–	4	–	0	3	–	6	–	0
Davidson	1	–	6	–	0	2	–	8	–	0
$ – Conference champion; Rankings from AP Poll

The 1937 North Carolina Tar Heels football team represented the University of North Carolina at Chapel Hill during the 1937 college football season. The Tar Heels were led by second-year head coach Raymond Wolf and played their home games at Kenan Memorial Stadium. They competed as a member of the Southern Conference, finishing with an undefeated conference record of 4–0–1. North Carolina claims a conference championship for 1937, although Maryland is recognized as the official conference champion with a 2–0 conference record. On October 25, 1937, the Tar Heels made the school's first ever appearance in the AP Poll, which was in its second year of operation. The team finished ranked 19th in the final poll of the season.

Andy Bershak was a consensus All-American end for the Tar Heels.

== Schedule ==
Date	Time	Opponent	Rank	Site	Result	Attendance	Source
September 25	2:30 p.m.	South Carolina		Kenan Memorial Stadium; Chapel Hill, NC (rivalry)	T 13–13	14,000	
October 2	2:30 p.m.	at NC State		Riddick Stadium; Raleigh, NC (rivalry)	W 20–0	16,000	
October 9	2:30 p.m.	at NYU*		Ohio Field; Bronx, NY	W 19–6	14,000	
October 16	2:30 p.m.	at Wake Forest		Gore Field; Wake Forest, NC (rivalry)	W 28–0	10,000	
October 23	2:30 p.m.	Tulane*		Kenan Memorial Stadium; Chapel Hill, NC	W 13–0	21,000	
October 30	2:30 p.m.	No. 10 Fordham*	No. 15	Kenan Memorial Stadium; Chapel Hill, NC	L 0–14	24,000	
November 6	2:30 p.m.	at Davidson		Richardson Field; Davidson, NC	W 26–0	8,000	
November 13	2:00 p.m.	at No. 8 Duke		Duke Stadium; Durham, NC (rivalry)	W 14–6	43,000	
November 25	2:00 p.m.	Virginia*	No. 18	Kenan Memorial Stadium; Chapel Hill, NC (South's Oldest Rivalry)	W 40–0	14,000	
*Non-conference game; Rankings from AP Poll released prior to the game; All times are in Eastern time
