= 1937 Davidson Wildcats football team =

American college football season

1937 Davidson Wildcats football
- Conference: Southern Conference
- Record: 2–8 (1–6 SoCon)
- Head coach: Gene McEver (2nd season)
- Home stadium: Richardson Field

1937 Southern Conference football standings
	Conf.					Overall
Team	W		L		T	W		L		T
Maryland $	2	–	0	–	0	8	–	2	–	0
No. 19 North Carolina	4	–	0	–	1	7	–	1	–	1
Clemson	2	–	0	–	1	4	–	4	–	1
No. 20 Duke	5	–	1	–	0	7	–	2	–	1
VMI	4	–	2	–	0	5	–	5	–	0
NC State	4	–	2	–	1	5	–	3	–	1
South Carolina	2	–	2	–	1	5	–	6	–	1
Washington and Lee	2	–	3	–	0	4	–	5	–	0
The Citadel	2	–	3	–	0	7	–	4	–	0
Richmond	2	–	3	–	0	5	–	4	–	1
Furman	1	–	2	–	2	4	–	3	–	2
VPI	2	–	4	–	0	5	–	5	–	0
William & Mary	1	–	3	–	0	4	–	5	–	0
Wake Forest	1	–	4	–	0	3	–	6	–	0
Davidson	1	–	6	–	0	2	–	8	–	0
$ – Conference champion; Rankings from AP Poll

The 1937 Davidson Wildcats football team was an American football team that represented Davidson College during the 1937 college football season as a member of the Southern Conference. In their second year under head coach Gene McEver, the team compiled an overall record of 2–8, with a mark of 1–6 in conference play, and finished in 15th place in the SoCon.

== Schedule ==
Date	Time	Opponent	Site	Result	Attendance	Source
September 18		vs. NC State	World War Memorial Stadium; Greensboro, NC	L 2–6	14,000	
September 25		Erskine*	Richardson Field; Davidson, NC	W 21–6	6,000	
October 2		Duke	Richardson Field; Davidson, NC	L 6–34	8,500	
October 9		at VMI	Alumni Field; Lexington, VA	L 0–7	2,500	
October 16		at South Carolina	Carolina Municipal Stadium; Columbia, SC	L 7–25	8,000	
October 23	3:00 p.m.	at Centre*	Farris Stadium; Danville, KY	L 0–8	2,000	
October 30		Furman	Richardson Field; Davidson, NC	W 13–9	4,500	
November 6		North Carolina^{†}	Richardson Field; Davidson, NC	L 0–26	8,000	
November 13		at Harvard*	Harvard Stadium; Boston, MA	L 0–15	3,000	
November 25		vs. Wake Forest	American Legion Memorial Stadium; Charlotte, NC	L 7–19	10,000	
*Non-conference game; ^{†}Homecoming; All times are in Eastern time
