= 1937 Georgetown Hoyas football team =

American college football season

1937 Georgetown Hoyas football
- Conference: Independent
- Record: 2–4–2
- Head coach: Jack Hagerty (6th season)
- Captain: Lawrence Hardy
- Home stadium: Griffith Stadium

1937 Southern college football independents records
	Conf.			Overall
Team	W	L	T	W		L		T
Delaware State		–		1	–	0	–	0
Hardin–Simmons		–		8	–	0	–	1
West Virginia		–		8	–	1	–	1
Catholic University		–		5	–	3	–	0
William & Mary Norfolk		–		5	–	3	–	0
Roanoke		–		6	–	4	–	0
Navy		–		4	–	4	–	1
George Washington		–		3	–	4	–	1
Georgetown		–		2	–	4	–	2
Western Maryland		–		3	–	6	–	0
East Carolina		–		2	–	5	–	0
Loyola (LA)		–		2	–	6	–	1
Virginia		–		2	–	7	–	0
South Georgia Teachers		–		2	–	9	–	0
Delaware		–		1	–	7	–	0
Oklahoma City		–		1	–	9	–	0
Jacksonville State		–		0	–	5	–	0

The 1937 Georgetown Hoyas football team was an American football team that represented Georgetown University as an independent during the 1937 college football season. In their sixth season under head coach Jack Hagerty, the Hoyas compiled a 2–4–2 record and were outscored by a total of 71 to 70. The team played its home games at Griffith Stadium in Washington, D.C.

== Schedule ==
Date	Opponent	Site	Result	Attendance	Source
October 2	Shenandoah	Griffith Stadium; Washington, DC	W 38–0		
October 9	at Holy Cross	Fitton Field; Worcester, MA	L 6–27	12,000	
October 16	Lafayette	Griffith Stadium; Washington, DC	L 0–6		
October 23	at Penn	Franklin Field; Philadelphia, PA	T 0–0	25,000	
October 30	Manhattan	Griffith Stadium; Washington, DC	L 12–20		
November 6	West Virginia	Griffith Stadium; Washington, DC	T 6–6		
November 13	at NYU	Polo Grounds; New York, NY	W 6–0	8,000	
November 20	Maryland	Griffith Stadium; Washington, DC	L 2–12	22,000	
