= 1937 East Carolina Pirates football team =

American college football season

1937 East Carolina Pirates football
- Conference: Independent
- Record: 2–5
- Head coach: J. D. Alexander (1st season)

1937 Southern college football independents records
	Conf.			Overall
Team	W	L	T	W		L		T
Delaware State		–		1	–	0	–	0
Hardin–Simmons		–		8	–	0	–	1
West Virginia		–		8	–	1	–	1
Catholic University		–		5	–	3	–	0
William & Mary Norfolk		–		5	–	3	–	0
Roanoke		–		6	–	4	–	0
Navy		–		4	–	4	–	1
George Washington		–		3	–	4	–	1
Georgetown		–		2	–	4	–	2
Western Maryland		–		3	–	6	–	0
East Carolina		–		2	–	5	–	0
Loyola (LA)		–		2	–	6	–	1
Virginia		–		2	–	7	–	0
South Georgia Teachers		–		2	–	9	–	0
Delaware		–		1	–	7	–	0
Oklahoma City		–		1	–	9	–	0
Jacksonville State		–		0	–	5	–	0

The 1937 East Carolina Pirates football team was an American football team that represented East Carolina Teachers College (now known as East Carolina University) as an independent during the 1937 college football season. In their first season under head coach J. D. Alexander, the team compiled a 2–5 record.

== Schedule ==
Date	Opponent	Site	Result	Source
October 2	at Guilford	Greensboro, NC	L 0–7	
October 9	Campbell	Greenville, NC	L 6–7	
October 16	Belmont Abbey	Greenville, NC	L 7–19	
October 23	Western Carolina	Greenville, NC	L 6–7	
October 29	at William & Mary Norfolk Division	Norfolk, VA	L 6–18	
November 6	High Point	Greenville, NC	W 19–7	
November 12	at Louisburg	Louisburg, NC	W 27–13	
