= 1937 Richmond Spiders football team =

American college football season

1937 Richmond Spiders football
- Conference: Southern Conference
- Record: 5–4–1 (2–3 SoCon)
- Head coach: Glenn Thistlethwaite (4th season)
- Captain: Charles E. Siddall
- Home stadium: City Stadium

1937 Southern Conference football standings
	Conf.					Overall
Team	W		L		T	W		L		T
Maryland $	2	–	0	–	0	8	–	2	–	0
No. 19 North Carolina	4	–	0	–	1	7	–	1	–	1
Clemson	2	–	0	–	1	4	–	4	–	1
No. 20 Duke	5	–	1	–	0	7	–	2	–	1
VMI	4	–	2	–	0	5	–	5	–	0
NC State	4	–	2	–	1	5	–	3	–	1
South Carolina	2	–	2	–	1	5	–	6	–	1
Washington and Lee	2	–	3	–	0	4	–	5	–	0
The Citadel	2	–	3	–	0	7	–	4	–	0
Richmond	2	–	3	–	0	5	–	4	–	1
Furman	1	–	2	–	2	4	–	3	–	2
VPI	2	–	4	–	0	5	–	5	–	0
William & Mary	1	–	3	–	0	4	–	5	–	0
Wake Forest	1	–	4	–	0	3	–	6	–	0
Davidson	1	–	6	–	0	2	–	8	–	0
$ – Conference champion; Rankings from AP Poll

The 1937 Richmond Spiders football team was an American football team that represented the University of Richmond as a member of the Southern Conference (SoCon) during the 1937 college football season. In their fourth season under head coach Glenn Thistlethwaite, Richmond compiled a 5–4–1 record, with a mark of 2–3 in conference play, finishing tied for eighth place in the SoCon.

== Schedule ==
Date	Opponent	Site	Result	Attendance	Source
September 17	at Apprentice*	Newport News, VA	T 6–6		
September 25	Randolph–Macon*	City Stadium; Richmond, VA	W 6–0	5,000	
October 2	at Washington and Lee	Wilson Field; Lexington, VA	L 0–6		
October 9	at Roanoke*	Maher Field; Roanoke, VA	W 22–13		
October 16	VMI	City Stadium; Richmond, VA (rivalry)	L 7–21	11,000	
October 22	at The Citadel	Johnson Hagood Stadium; Charleston, SC	L 0–26		
October 29	at Duquesne*	Forbes Field; Pittsburgh, PA	L 0–24	5,269	
November 6	VPI	City Stadium; Richmond, VA	W 12–7		
November 13	Hampden–Sydney*	City Stadium; Richmond, VA	W 19–0	3,500	
November 25	William & Mary	City Stadium; Richmond, VA (rivalry)	W 6–0	12,000	
*Non-conference game
