= 1937 Delaware State Hornets football team =

American college football season

1937 Delaware State Hornets football
- Conference: Independent
- Record: 1–0
- Head coach: Unknown

1937 Southern college football independents records
	Conf.			Overall
Team	W	L	T	W		L		T
Delaware State		–		1	–	0	–	0
Hardin–Simmons		–		8	–	0	–	1
West Virginia		–		8	–	1	–	1
Catholic University		–		5	–	3	–	0
William & Mary Norfolk		–		5	–	3	–	0
Roanoke		–		6	–	4	–	0
Navy		–		4	–	4	–	1
George Washington		–		3	–	4	–	1
Georgetown		–		2	–	4	–	2
Western Maryland		–		3	–	6	–	0
East Carolina		–		2	–	5	–	0
Loyola (LA)		–		2	–	6	–	1
Virginia		–		2	–	7	–	0
South Georgia Teachers		–		2	–	9	–	0
Delaware		–		1	–	7	–	0
Oklahoma City		–		1	–	9	–	0
Jacksonville State		–		0	–	5	–	0

The 1937 Delaware State Hornets football team represented the State College for Colored Students—now known as Delaware State University—in the 1937 college football season as an independent. They won their only game 13–6 against Lincoln (PA).

== Schedule ==
Opponent	Site	Result
Lincoln (PA)		W 13–6
