= 1937 Catholic University Cardinals football team =

American college football season

1937 Catholic University Cardinals football
- Conference: Independent
- Record: 5–3
- Head coach: Dutch Bergman (8th season)
- Home stadium: Brookland Stadium, Griffith Stadium

1937 Southern college football independents records
	Conf.			Overall
Team	W	L	T	W		L		T
Delaware State		–		1	–	0	–	0
Hardin–Simmons		–		8	–	0	–	1
West Virginia		–		8	–	1	–	1
Catholic University		–		5	–	3	–	0
William & Mary Norfolk		–		5	–	3	–	0
Roanoke		–		6	–	4	–	0
Navy		–		4	–	4	–	1
George Washington		–		3	–	4	–	1
Georgetown		–		2	–	4	–	2
Western Maryland		–		3	–	6	–	0
East Carolina		–		2	–	5	–	0
Loyola (LA)		–		2	–	6	–	1
Virginia		–		2	–	7	–	0
South Georgia Teachers		–		2	–	9	–	0
Delaware		–		1	–	7	–	0
Oklahoma City		–		1	–	9	–	0
Jacksonville State		–		0	–	5	–	0

The 1937 Catholic University Cardinals football team was an American football team that represented the Catholic University of America as an independent during the 1937 college football season. In its eighth year under head coach Dutch Bergman, the team compiled a 5–3 record and outscored opponents by a total of 105 to 90.

== Schedule ==
Date	Opponent	Site	Result	Source
September 26	at Canisius	Buffalo, NY	W 14–6	
October 2	Loyola (LA)	Brookland Stadium; Washington, DC	W 14–0	
October 10	at La Salle	McCarthy Stadium; Philadelphia, PA	W 27–12	
October 15	Detroit	Griffith Stadium; Washington, DC	L 0–30	
October 23	at Saint Louis	Walsh Stadium; St. Louis, MO	L 2–7	
November 6	West Virginia Wesleyan	Brookland Stadium; Washington, DC	W 21–0	
November 12	at Miami (FL)	Burdine Stadium; Miami, FL	L 0–21	
November 25	South Carolina	Brookland Stadium; Washington, DC	W 27–14	
