= 1937 Jacksonville State Eagle Owls football team =

American college football season

1937 Jacksonville State Eagle Owls football
- Conference: Independent
- Record: 0–5
- Head coach: T. B. Shotts (7th season)
- Home stadium: College Field

1937 Southern college football independents records
	Conf.			Overall
Team	W	L	T	W		L		T
Delaware State		–		1	–	0	–	0
Hardin–Simmons		–		8	–	0	–	1
West Virginia		–		8	–	1	–	1
Catholic University		–		5	–	3	–	0
William & Mary Norfolk		–		5	–	3	–	0
Roanoke		–		6	–	4	–	0
Navy		–		4	–	4	–	1
George Washington		–		3	–	4	–	1
Georgetown		–		2	–	4	–	2
Western Maryland		–		3	–	6	–	0
East Carolina		–		2	–	5	–	0
Loyola (LA)		–		2	–	6	–	1
Virginia		–		2	–	7	–	0
South Georgia Teachers		–		2	–	9	–	0
Delaware		–		1	–	7	–	0
Oklahoma City		–		1	–	9	–	0
Jacksonville State		–		0	–	5	–	0

The 1937 Jacksonville State Eagle Owls football team represented Jacksonville State Teachers College (now known as Jacksonville State University) as an independent during the 1937 college football season. Led by seventh-year head coach T. B. Shotts, the Eagle Owls compiled an overall record of 0–5.

== Schedule ==
Date	Opponent	Site	Result	Source
October 8	at Middle Tennessee State	Horace Jones Field; Murfreesboro, TN	L 0–37	
October 15	Marion	College Field; Jacksonville, AL	L 0–6	
October 23	at Mississippi State Teachers	Faulkner Field; Hattiesburg, MS	L 0–58	
October 29	at West Tennessee State Teachers	Fairgrounds Stadium; Memphis, TN	L 0–46	
November 7	at Pensacola NAS	Legion Field; Pensacola, FL	L 0–38	
