= 1937 William & Mary Indians football team =

American college football season

1937 William & Mary Indians football
- Conference: Southern Conference
- Record: 4–5 (1–3 SoCon)
- Head coach: Branch Bocock (5th season)
- Captain: John Coiner
- Home stadium: Cary Field

1937 Southern Conference football standings
	Conf.					Overall
Team	W		L		T	W		L		T
Maryland $	2	–	0	–	0	8	–	2	–	0
No. 19 North Carolina	4	–	0	–	1	7	–	1	–	1
Clemson	2	–	0	–	1	4	–	4	–	1
No. 20 Duke	5	–	1	–	0	7	–	2	–	1
VMI	4	–	2	–	0	5	–	5	–	0
NC State	4	–	2	–	1	5	–	3	–	1
South Carolina	2	–	2	–	1	5	–	6	–	1
Washington and Lee	2	–	3	–	0	4	–	5	–	0
The Citadel	2	–	3	–	0	7	–	4	–	0
Richmond	2	–	3	–	0	5	–	4	–	1
Furman	1	–	2	–	2	4	–	3	–	2
VPI	2	–	4	–	0	5	–	5	–	0
William & Mary	1	–	3	–	0	4	–	5	–	0
Wake Forest	1	–	4	–	0	3	–	6	–	0
Davidson	1	–	6	–	0	2	–	8	–	0
$ – Conference champion; Rankings from AP Poll

The 1937 William & Mary Indians football team represented the College of William & Mary as a member of the Southern Conference (SoCon) during the 1937 college football season. Led by fifth-year head coach Branch Bocock, the Indians compiled an overall record of 4–5 with a mark of 1–3 in conference play, placing 13th in the SoCon. William & Mary played home games at Cary Field in Williamsburg, Virginia.

== Schedule ==
Date	Opponent	Site	Result	Attendance	Source
September 25	at Navy*	Thompson Stadium; Annapolis, MD	L 0–45	15,302	
October 2	vs. VMI	Foreman Field; Norfolk, VA (rivalry)	L 9–20	5,000	
October 9	vs. VPI	City Stadium; Richmond, VA	W 12–0	6,000	
October 16	Guilford*	Cary Field; Williamsburg, VA	W 37–0		
October 23	American*	Cary Field; Williamsburg, VA	W 38–0		
October 30	at Virginia*	Scott Stadium; Charlottesville, VA	L 0–6	5,000	
November 6	Hapmden–Sydney*	Cary Field; Williamsburg, VA	W 21–12		
November 13	Washington and Lee^{†}	Cary Field; Williamsburg, VA	L 12–14		
November 25	at Richmond	City Stadium; Richmond, VA (rivalry)	L 0–6	12,000	
*Non-conference game; ^{†}Homecoming
