= 1937 Roanoke Maroons football team =

American college football season

1937 Roanoke Maroons football
- Conference: Independent
- Record: 6–4
- Head coach: Gordon C. White (8th season)
- Home stadium: College Field; Maher Field

1937 Southern college football independents records
	Conf.			Overall
Team	W	L	T	W		L		T
Delaware State		–		1	–	0	–	0
Hardin–Simmons		–		8	–	0	–	1
West Virginia		–		8	–	1	–	1
Catholic University		–		5	–	3	–	0
William & Mary Norfolk		–		5	–	3	–	0
Roanoke		–		6	–	4	–	0
Navy		–		4	–	4	–	1
George Washington		–		3	–	4	–	1
Georgetown		–		2	–	4	–	2
Western Maryland		–		3	–	6	–	0
East Carolina		–		2	–	5	–	0
Loyola (LA)		–		2	–	6	–	1
Virginia		–		2	–	7	–	0
South Georgia Teachers		–		2	–	9	–	0
Delaware		–		1	–	7	–	0
Oklahoma City		–		1	–	9	–	0
Jacksonville State		–		0	–	5	–	0

The 1937 Roanoke Maroons football team represented Roanoke College as an independent during the 1937 college football season. Led by eighth-year head coach Gordon C. White, the Maroons compiled an overall record of 6–4.

== Schedule ==
Date	Opponent	Site	Result	Attendance	Source
September 18	at VPI	Miles Stadium; Blacksburg, VA	L 7–27	4,000	
September 25	Lenoir–Rhyne	College Field; Salem, VA	W 13–0		
October 2	Concord State	College Field; Salem, VA	W 10–0		
October 9	Richmond	Maher Field; Roanoke, VA	L 13–22		
October 16	at Catawba	Shuford Stadium; Salisbury, NC	L 19–32		
October 22	at Apprentice	Apprentice Field; Newport News, VA	L 0–7		
October 29	Newberry	College Field; Salem, VA	W 6–0		
November 6	Emory and Henry^{†}	College Field; Salem, VA	W 22–7	1,500	
November 13	at Susquehanna	Selinsgrove, PA	W 14–7		
November 25	at King	Bristol Municipal Stadium; Bristol, TN	W 9–0		
^{†}Homecoming
