= 1937 Delaware Fightin' Blue Hens football team =

American college football season

1937 Delaware Fightin' Blue Hens football
- Conference: Independent
- Record: 1–7
- Head coach: Lyal Clark (3rd season)
- Home stadium: Frazer Field

1937 Southern college football independents records
| | Conf. | | | Overall |
| Team | W | L | T | W | | L | | T |
|---|---|---|---|---|---|---|---|---|
| Delaware State | | – | | 1 | – | 0 | – | 0 |
| Hardin–Simmons | | – | | 8 | – | 0 | – | 1 |
| West Virginia | | – | | 8 | – | 1 | – | 1 |
| Catholic University | | – | | 5 | – | 3 | – | 0 |
| William & Mary Norfolk | | – | | 5 | – | 3 | – | 0 |
| Roanoke | | – | | 6 | – | 4 | – | 0 |
| Navy | | – | | 4 | – | 4 | – | 1 |
| George Washington | | – | | 3 | – | 4 | – | 1 |
| Georgetown | | – | | 2 | – | 4 | – | 2 |
| Western Maryland | | – | | 3 | – | 6 | – | 0 |
| East Carolina | | – | | 2 | – | 5 | – | 0 |
| Loyola (LA) | | – | | 2 | – | 6 | – | 1 |
| Virginia | | – | | 2 | – | 7 | – | 0 |
| South Georgia Teachers | | – | | 2 | – | 9 | – | 0 |
| Delaware | | – | | 1 | – | 7 | – | 0 |
| Oklahoma City | | – | | 1 | – | 9 | – | 0 |
| Jacksonville State | | – | | 0 | – | 5 | – | 0 |

The 1937 Delaware Fightin' Blue Hens football team was an American football team that represented the University of Delaware in the 1937 college football season. In their third season under head coach Lyal Clark, the Blue Hens compiled a 1–7 record and were outscored by a total of 113 to 64. The team played its home games at Frazer Field in Newark, Delaware.

== Schedule ==
| Date | Opponent | Site | Result | Attendance | Source |
|---|---|---|---|---|---|
| October 2 | at Ursinus | Collegeville, PA | L 6–11 | | |
| October 9 | at Rutgers | Neilson Field; New Brunswick, NJ | L 0–27 | | |
| October 16 | Lebanon Valley | Frazer Field; Newark, DE | L 7–23 | | |
| October 23 | Dickinson | Frazer Field; Newark, DE | L 0–18 | | |
| October 30 | St. John's (MD) | Frazer Field; Newark, DE | W 32–7 | | |
| November 6 | vs. Pennsylvania Military | Municipal Auditorium; Atlantic City, NJ | L 0–3 | 12,000 | |
| November 13 | at Drexel | Drexel Field; Philadelphia, PA | L 6–8 | | |
| November 20 | Washington College | Frazer Field; Newark, DE | L 13–16 | | |
