= 1937 Virginia Cavaliers football team =

American college football season

1937 Virginia Cavaliers football
- Conference: Independent
- Record: 2–7
- Head coach: Frank Murray (1st season)
- Captains: William Weeks II; Stephen Davenport
- Home stadium: Scott Stadium

1937 Southern college football independents records
	Conf.			Overall
Team	W	L	T	W		L		T
Delaware State		–		1	–	0	–	0
Hardin–Simmons		–		8	–	0	–	1
West Virginia		–		8	–	1	–	1
Catholic University		–		5	–	3	–	0
William & Mary Norfolk		–		5	–	3	–	0
Roanoke		–		6	–	4	–	0
Navy		–		4	–	4	–	1
George Washington		–		3	–	4	–	1
Georgetown		–		2	–	4	–	2
Western Maryland		–		3	–	6	–	0
East Carolina		–		2	–	5	–	0
Loyola (LA)		–		2	–	6	–	1
Virginia		–		2	–	7	–	0
South Georgia Teachers		–		2	–	9	–	0
Delaware		–		1	–	7	–	0
Oklahoma City		–		1	–	9	–	0
Jacksonville State		–		0	–	5	–	0

The 1937 Virginia Cavaliers football team represented the University of Virginia during the 1937 college football season. The Cavaliers were led by first-year head coach Frank Murray and played their home games at Scott Stadium in Charlottesville, Virginia. They competed as independents for the first time after quitting the Southern Conference in 1936, finishing with a record of 2–7.

== Schedule ==
Date	Opponent	Site	Result	Attendance	Source
September 25	Hampden–Sydney	Scott Stadium; Charlottesville, VA	W 13–7	5,000	
October 2	at Princeton	Palmer Stadium; Princeton, NJ	L 0–26	15,000	
October 9	at Navy	Thompson Stadium; Annapolis, MD	L 13–40	18,000	
October 16	Maryland	Scott Stadium; Charlottesville, VA (rivalry)	L 0–3	6,000	
October 23	VMI^{†}	Scott Stadium; Charlottesville, VA	L 7–26	10,000	
October 30	William & Mary	Scott Stadium; Charlottesville, VA	W 6–0	5,000	
November 6	at Washington and Lee	Wilson Field; Lexington, VA	L 6–13	8,000	
November 13	VPI	Scott Stadium; Charlottesville, VA (rivalry)	L 7–14	7,000–7,500	
November 25	at No. 18 North Carolina	Kenan Memorial Stadium; Chapel Hill, NC (rivalry)	L 0–40	14,000	
^{†}Homecoming; Rankings from AP Poll released prior to the game
