= 1937 Navy Midshipmen football team =

American college football season

1937 Navy Midshipmen football
- Conference: Independent
- Record: 4–4–1
- Head coach: Hank Hardwick (1st season)
- Captain: Ray Dubois
- Home stadium: Thompson Stadium

1937 Southern college football independents records
	Conf.			Overall
Team	W	L	T	W		L		T
Delaware State		–		1	–	0	–	0
Hardin–Simmons		–		8	–	0	–	1
West Virginia		–		8	–	1	–	1
Catholic University		–		5	–	3	–	0
William & Mary Norfolk		–		5	–	3	–	0
Roanoke		–		6	–	4	–	0
Navy		–		4	–	4	–	1
George Washington		–		3	–	4	–	1
Georgetown		–		2	–	4	–	2
Western Maryland		–		3	–	6	–	0
East Carolina		–		2	–	5	–	0
Loyola (LA)		–		2	–	6	–	1
Virginia		–		2	–	7	–	0
South Georgia Teachers		–		2	–	9	–	0
Delaware		–		1	–	7	–	0
Oklahoma City		–		1	–	9	–	0
Jacksonville State		–		0	–	5	–	0

The 1937 Navy Midshipmen football team represented the United States Naval Academy during the 1937 college football season. In their first season under head coach Hank Hardwick, the Midshipmen compiled a 4–4–1 record and outscored their opponents by a combined score of 150 to 74.

== Schedule ==
Date	Opponent	Site	Result	Attendance	Source
September 25	William & Mary	Thompson Stadium; Annapolis, MD	W 45–0	15,302	
October 2	The Citadel	Thompson Stadium; Annapolis, MD	W 32–0	15,000	
October 9	Virginia	Thompson Stadium; Annapolis, MD	W 40–13	18,000	
October 16	Harvard	Municipal Stadium; Baltimore, MD	T 0–0	54,000	
October 23	at Notre Dame	Notre Dame Stadium; Notre Dame, IN (rivalry)	L 7–9	45,000	
October 30	at Penn	Franklin Field; Philadelphia, PA	L 7–14	63,000	
November 6	Columbia	Thompson Stadium; Annapolis, MD	W 13–6	20,000	
November 20	at Princeton	Palmer Stadium; Princeton, NJ	L 6–26	48,000	
November 27	vs. Army	Philadelphia Municipal Stadium; Philadelphia, PA (Army–Navy Game)	L 0–6	102,000	
