= 1937 George Washington Colonials football team =

American college football season

1937 George Washington Colonials football
- Conference: Independent
- Record: 3–4–1
- Head coach: Jim Pixlee (9th season)
- Home stadium: Griffith Stadium

1937 Southern college football independents records
	Conf.			Overall
Team	W	L	T	W		L		T
Delaware State		–		1	–	0	–	0
Hardin–Simmons		–		8	–	0	–	1
West Virginia		–		8	–	1	–	1
Catholic University		–		5	–	3	–	0
William & Mary Norfolk		–		5	–	3	–	0
Roanoke		–		6	–	4	–	0
Navy		–		4	–	4	–	1
George Washington		–		3	–	4	–	1
Georgetown		–		2	–	4	–	2
Western Maryland		–		3	–	6	–	0
East Carolina		–		2	–	5	–	0
Loyola (LA)		–		2	–	6	–	1
Virginia		–		2	–	7	–	0
South Georgia Teachers		–		2	–	9	–	0
Delaware		–		1	–	7	–	0
Oklahoma City		–		1	–	9	–	0
Jacksonville State		–		0	–	5	–	0

The 1937 George Washington Colonials football team was an American football team that represented George Washington University as an independent during the 1937 college football season. In its ninth and final season under head coach Jim Pixlee, the team compiled a 3–4–1 record and was outscored by a total of 105 to 104.

== Schedule ==
Date	Opponent	Site	Result	Attendance	Source
October 1	Wake Forest	Griffith Stadium; Washington, DC	W 34–6	15,000	
October 8	West Virginia Wesleyan	Griffith Stadium; Washington, DC	W 18–13	10,161	
October 23	No. 2 Alabama	Griffith Stadium; Washington, DC	L 0–19	24,666	
October 29	Tulsa	Griffith Stadium; Washington, DC	L 13–14	10,000–13,000	
November 5	Ole Miss	Griffith Stadium; Washington, DC	L 6–27	11,800	
November 13	North Dakota Agricultural	Griffith Stadium; Washington, DC	W 33–0		
November 20	at Arkansas	Quigley Stadium; Little Rock, AR	T 0–0	8,000	
November 25	at West Virginia	Mountaineer Field; Morgantown, WV	L 0–26	12,000	
Rankings from AP Poll released prior to the game
