= 1937 Hardin–Simmons Cowboys football team =

American college football season

1937 Hardin–Simmons Cowboys football
- Conference: Independent
- Record: 8–0–1
- Head coach: Frank Kimbrough (3rd season)

1937 Southern college football independents records
	Conf.			Overall
Team	W	L	T	W		L		T
Delaware State		–		1	–	0	–	0
Hardin–Simmons		–		8	–	0	–	1
West Virginia		–		8	–	1	–	1
Catholic University		–		5	–	3	–	0
William & Mary Norfolk		–		5	–	3	–	0
Roanoke		–		6	–	4	–	0
Navy		–		4	–	4	–	1
George Washington		–		3	–	4	–	1
Georgetown		–		2	–	4	–	2
Western Maryland		–		3	–	6	–	0
East Carolina		–		2	–	5	–	0
Loyola (LA)		–		2	–	6	–	1
Virginia		–		2	–	7	–	0
South Georgia Teachers		–		2	–	9	–	0
Delaware		–		1	–	7	–	0
Oklahoma City		–		1	–	9	–	0
Jacksonville State		–		0	–	5	–	0

The 1937 Hardin–Simmons Cowboys football team was an American football team that represented Hardin–Simmons University as an independent during the 1937 college football season. In its third season under head coach Frank Kimbrough, the team compiled an 8–0–1 record and shut out five of nine opponents.

== Schedule ==
Date	Opponent	Site	Result	Attendance	Source
September 24	Murray State	Parramore Field; Abilene, TX	W 21–0		
October 1	Ouachita	Parramore Field; Abilene, TX	W 51–0		
October 8	at Loyola (CA)	Gilmore Stadium; Los Angeles, CA	W 7–0	18,000	
October 15	at West Texas State	Buffalo Stadium; Canyon, TX	W 40–0		
October 29	at East Texas State	Commerce, TX	W 15–12		
November 6	vs. Emporia State	Coyote Stadium; Wichita Falls, TX	W 66–6		
November 11	at Fresno State	Fresno State College Stadium; Fresno, CA	W 14–7	11,371	
November 19	Oklahoma City	Parramore Field; Abilene, TX	W 26–0		
December 4	Howard Payne	Parramore Field; Abilene, TX	T 7–7	6,000	
