= 1937 West Virginia Mountaineers football team =

American college football season

1937 West Virginia Mountaineers football

Sun Bowl champion

Sun Bowl, W 7–6 vs. Texas Tech
- Conference: Independent
- Record: 8–1–1
- Head coach: Marshall Glenn (1st season)
- Captain: David Volkin
- Home stadium: Mountaineer Field

1937 Southern college football independents records
| | Conf. | | | Overall |
| Team | W | L | T | W | | L | | T |
|---|---|---|---|---|---|---|---|---|
| Delaware State | | – | | 1 | – | 0 | – | 0 |
| Hardin–Simmons | | – | | 8 | – | 0 | – | 1 |
| West Virginia | | – | | 8 | – | 1 | – | 1 |
| Catholic University | | – | | 5 | – | 3 | – | 0 |
| William & Mary Norfolk | | – | | 5 | – | 3 | – | 0 |
| Roanoke | | – | | 6 | – | 4 | – | 0 |
| Navy | | – | | 4 | – | 4 | – | 1 |
| George Washington | | – | | 3 | – | 4 | – | 1 |
| Georgetown | | – | | 2 | – | 4 | – | 2 |
| Western Maryland | | – | | 3 | – | 6 | – | 0 |
| East Carolina | | – | | 2 | – | 5 | – | 0 |
| Loyola (LA) | | – | | 2 | – | 6 | – | 1 |
| Virginia | | – | | 2 | – | 7 | – | 0 |
| South Georgia Teachers | | – | | 2 | – | 9 | – | 0 |
| Delaware | | – | | 1 | – | 7 | – | 0 |
| Oklahoma City | | – | | 1 | – | 9 | – | 0 |
| Jacksonville State | | – | | 0 | – | 5 | – | 0 |

The 1937 West Virginia Mountaineers football team was an American football team that represented West Virginia University as an independent during the 1937 college football season. In its first season under head coach Marshall Glenn, the team compiled an 8–1–1 record, defeated Texas Tech in the 1938 Sun Bowl, and outscored opponents by a total of 183 to 39. The team played its home games at Mountaineer Field in Morgantown, West Virginia. David Volkin was the team captain.

== Schedule ==
| Date | Opponent | Site | Result | Attendance | Source |
|---|---|---|---|---|---|
| September 25 | at West Virginia Wesleyan | Buckhannon, WV | W 14–0 | | |
| October 2 | Pittsburgh | Mountaineer Field; Morgantown, WV (rivalry) | L 0–20 | 18,000 | |
| October 9 | vs. Washington and Lee | Laidley Field; Charleston, WV | W 6–0 | 4,500 | |
| October 16 | at Xavier | Corcoran Stadium; Cincinnati, OH | W 13–7 | 6,000 | |
| October 23 | Waynesburg | Mountaineer Field; Morgantown, WV | W 13–0 | 2,500 | |
| October 30 | vs. Western Maryland | Municipal Stadium; Baltimore, MD | W 64–0 | | |
| November 6 | at Georgetown | Griffith Stadium; Washington, DC | T 6–6 | | |
| November 13 | Toledo | Mountaineer Field; Morgantown, WV | W 34–0 | 6,000 | |
| November 25 | George Washington^{†} | Mountaineer Field; Morgantown, WV | W 26–0 | 12,000 | |
| January 1, 1938 | vs. Texas Tech | Kidd Field; El Paso, TX (Sun Bowl) | W 7–6 | 12,000 | |
^{†}Homecoming
