= Clark Shaughnessy =

American football player and coach (1892–1970)

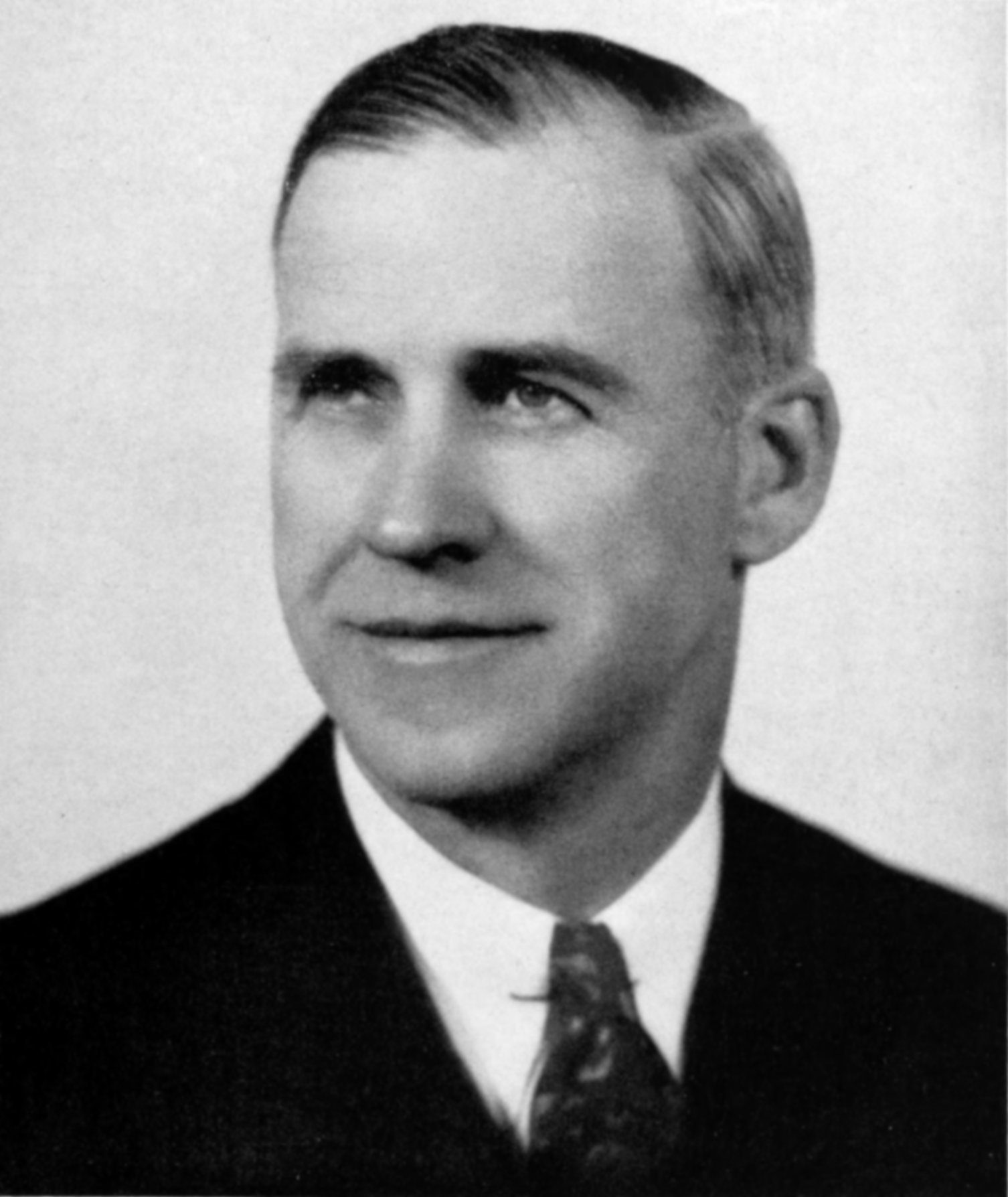
- Shaughnessy as Maryland coach in 1942

Biographical details
- Born: March 6, 1892; St. Cloud, Minnesota, U.S.
- Died: May 15, 1970 (aged 78); Santa Monica, California, U.S.

Playing career

Football
- 1911–1913: Minnesota
- Positions: Fullback, tackle, end

Coaching career (HC unless noted)

Football
- 1914: Minnesota (assistant)
- 1915–1920: Tulane
- 1922–1926: Tulane
- 1927–1932: Loyola (LA)
- 1933–1939: Chicago
- 1940–1941: Stanford
- 1942: Maryland
- 1943–1945: Pittsburgh
- 1944–1947: Washington Redskins (advisor)
- 1946: Maryland
- 1948–1949: Los Angeles Rams
- 1951–1962: Chicago Bears (DC)
- 1965: Hawaii

Basketball
- 1915–1918: Tulane

Administrative career (AD unless noted)
- 1915–1920: Tulane

Head coaching record
- Overall: 150–117–17 (college football); 14–7–3 (NFL); 27–15 (college basketball)
- Bowls: 1–0

Accomplishments and honors

Championships
- Football; 1 SIAA (1920); 1 SoCon (1925); 1 PCC (1940)

Awards
- Third-team All-American (1912); First-team All-Western (1912)
- College Football Hall of Fame; Inducted in 1968 (profile)

Clark Daniel Shaughnessy (born Clark Daniel O'Shaughnessy; March 6, 1892 – May 15, 1970) was an American football coach and innovator. He is sometimes called the "father of the T formation" and the original founder of the forward pass, although that system had previously been used as early as the 1880s. Shaughnessy did, however, modernize the obsolescent T formation to make it once again relevant in the sport, particularly for the quarterback and the receiver positions. He employed his innovations most famously on offense, but on the defensive side of the ball as well, and he earned a reputation as a ceaseless experimenter.

Shaughnessy held head coaching positions at Tulane University, Loyola University New Orleans, the University of Chicago, Stanford University, the University of Maryland, the University of Pittsburgh, the University of Hawaii, and in the National Football League with the Los Angeles Rams. Shaughnessy also served in advisory capacities with the Chicago Bears and the Washington Redskins.

He reached the height of his success in 1940, in his first season at Stanford, where he led the Indians to an undefeated season that culminated with a Rose Bowl victory. That year, he also helped prepare the Chicago Bears for the 1940 NFL Championship Game, in which they routed Washington, 73–0. Shaughnessy's successes showcased the effectiveness of the T formation and encouraged its widespread adoption. He was inducted into the College Football Hall of Fame in 1968. Shaughnessy also coached college basketball at Tulane University. He played college football at the University of Minnesota.

In 2021, the Professional Football Researchers Association named Shaughnessy to the PFRA Hall of Very Good Class of 2021.

== Early life and college ==
Shaughnessy was born on March 6, 1892, in St. Cloud, Minnesota, the second son of Lucy Ann (Foster) and Edward Shaughnessy. He attended North St. Paul High School, and prior to college, had no athletic experience. When he attended the University of Minnesota, however, he played college football under head coach Henry L. Williams and alongside halfback Bernie Bierman. Shaughnessy considered Williams to be football's greatest teacher, and Williams considered him to be the best passer from the Midwest. Shaughnessy handled both the passing and kicking duties for the team.

He played on the freshman squad in 1910 and on the varsity squad from 1911 to 1913, first as an end, then a tackle in 1912, and finally as a fullback in 1913. Of the three, Shaughnessy said he preferred the tackle position. In 1912, he recovered three fumbles against Iowa, and Walter Camp named him an alternate on his All-America team. As a senior, Shaughnessy was named to the All-Big Ten Conference first team.

Shaughnessy played basketball as a guard and ran track in the 440- and 880-yard events. The Minnesota athletic director asked him to join the basketball team before a game against Illinois, despite the fact he had never played and did not know the rules. He joined the track and field team in similar fashion, and replaced a half-mile runner even though he did not own and had never worn track spikes. In The Big Ten: A Century of Excellence, Shaughnessy was called "one of the most versatile athletes in Minnesota's history." Shaughnessy also competed as a rower with the St. Paul Boat Club. He was a member of the Sigma Chi fraternity.

== Coaching career ==
=== Tulane ===
After graduation, he remained at his alma mater, Minnesota, for one season as an assistant coach in 1914. Tulane University selected Shaughnessy as head football coach in 1915 over potential candidates Dana X. Bible and Charley Moran, among others. Notre Dame assistant coach Knute Rockne and Ray Morrison were both unable to travel to New Orleans for an interview, and Tulane officials required a face-to-face meeting with the applicants. The school offered Shaughnessy $1,875 ($59,673 adjusted for inflation) to be its football, basketball, and track coach, and athletic director. When he arrived, he found the football field in a state of disrepair and the equipment to be woefully inadequate. Because the athletic department was in dire financial straits, Shaughnessy paid to purchase new equipment for the team. With only one opponent scheduled in the upcoming season, he wrote letters to sixty schools to secure additional games.

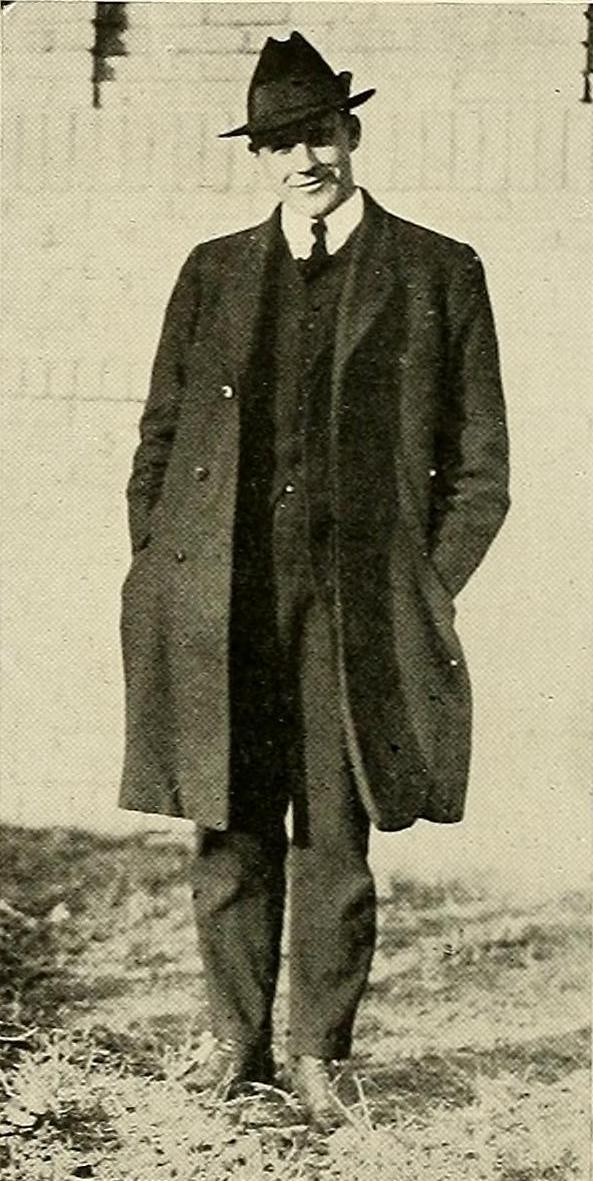
Shaughnessy during his first season at Tulane in 1915

Shaughnessy introduced to Tulane the Minnesota shift, an innovation created by his former coach Henry L. Williams. By 1919, Shaughnessy had transformed Tulane into a competitor amongst Southern collegiate teams. That season, he guided them to a then school record of seven consecutive wins. In 1920, Germany Schulz was hired to take over duties as athletic director, and he also aided Shaughnessy as the line coach from 1923 to 1925.

In 1923, Shaughnessy hired his former teammate Bernie Bierman as an assistant coach. Bierman remained on the staff for three seasons before he left to become head coach at Mississippi A&M. In 1924, Tulane set a new school record for wins and finished with an 8–1 record. The following season, the Green Wave bested the prior year's mark and posted a 9–0–1 record. School officials declined an invitation to face Washington in the Rose Bowl, because they believed the Tulane players were too small. Indiana University attempted to hire Shaughnessy after his undefeated season, but he instead chose to sign a ten-year extension with Tulane.

In a 1926 article written for the NEA News Service, he responded to those who asked him how the "Shaughnessy System" worked so well. He said, "If there is a 'Shaughnessy system' at Tulane, if it has any 'secret,' two words tell the whole story—common sense. All that I have done at Tulane is take the material I found and train it in plays built around the individual abilities of each man."

Despite optimistic preseason predictions, Tulane suffered its first and only losing season of Shaughnessy's tenure in 1926. He was considered for the head job at Northwestern in February 1927 after Clarence Spears turned it down. Shaughnessy later received similar offers from Louisiana State and Wisconsin. On April 8, 1927, he tendered his resignation without a publicly stated reason and was subsequently released from his contract. Tulane replaced him with former assistant Bernie Bierman. The Milwaukee Journal credited Shaughnessy with building a formidable team at Tulane, and noted that he increased revenue and improved facilities, while he used the available players and did not pay them "a nickel". At the end of his tenure, Shaughnessy held a record of 59–28–7, and as of 2010, he continues to hold the record for the most wins of any Tulane football coach. He also coached the basketball team for three seasons between 1915 and 1918 and amassed a 27–15 record.

=== Loyola ===
In June 1927, nearby Loyola of the South hired Shaughnessy as its head football coach. According to The Wow Boys: A Coach, a Team, and a Turning Point in College Football, a New Orleans millionaire offered him $175,000 to coach Loyola for ten years ($3,243,534 adjusted for inflation). This made him one of the highest paid football coaches in the nation at the time.

In 1928, Loyola traveled to South Bend, Indiana, to play Notre Dame in its season opener. The Wolves took a 6–0 halftime lead before they eventually fell, 12–6. After the game, Notre Dame head coach Knute Rockne reportedly said, "Never get me another 'warm-up game' against a team coached by that guy." The following year, Rockne was asked to name the best football coach and responded, "Modesty forbids ... But if I can name the two best football coaches in America, one of them is going to be Clark Shaughnessy."

At Loyola, Shaughnessy retained his emphasis on the forward pass. In 1930, the Wolves beat larger but unprepared Iowa State and Detroit teams in consecutive weeks with the same passing play. During his tenure, he was called "the greatest one man coaching staff in football." He also brought to Loyola his modified version of the Minnesota shift, which he claimed no opponent had been able to completely counteract. In 1931, California considered Shaughnessy as a candidate for its head coaching job. Despite opportunities to coach elsewhere, Shaughnessy remained in New Orleans because he liked the city and it was his wife's hometown. He compiled a 38–16–6 record at Loyola from 1927 to 1932.

=== Chicago ===
After the 1932 season, University of Chicago president Dr. Robert Maynard Hutchins forced out 70-year-old head coach Amos Alonzo Stagg, whom he considered too old for the position. Stagg then moved on to coach at the College of the Pacific. Athletic director T. Nelson Metcalf hired Shaughnessy to replace Stagg as head coach in 1933. Shaughnessy inherited a difficult situation at Chicago, and for the most part, lacked good material. He did, however, inherit from Stagg at least one important recruit: inaugural Heisman Trophy winner and future Hall of Fame back Jay Berwanger, whom many Midwest pundits considered the best back of the 1930s.

Under an academic program implemented in 1933 known as the New Plan or the Chicago Plan, annual comprehensive examinations replaced end-of-term testing. This new schedule conflicted with spring football practice, which was shortened each subsequent season until it was eventually eliminated altogether. Without that extra practice to learn Shaughnessy's complex system, time had to be devoted to basics in the fall. The New Plan also hindered the availability of suitable football players: It encouraged younger students to enroll, discouraged the transfer of student-athletes, and had stringent academic requirements to maintain athletic eligibility. Athletic director Metcalf said, "Others do legitimate recruiting, which we do not." Putting Chicago at further disadvantage to its Big Ten opponents, university president Hutchins would not countenance the establishment of a physical education major.

At the first practice in 1933, Shaughnessy assessed he would have a good line, but an undersized backfield. He told the assembled candidates that they would use an open game and fast passing attack to offset their disadvantages. In his first season, Shaughnessy awarded a box of candy to the Maroon player who made the first tackle of each game for the player to give to his girlfriend. The "C" men alumni organization created similar incentives for the most valuable player, best tackler, and best blocker.

In January 1934, Shaughnessy hired Marchmont Schwartz as an assistant coach. Schwartz had played on Shaughnessy's Loyola freshman team before he transferred to Notre Dame. In February, Shaughnessy declined interest from Ohio State to replace former head coach Sam Willaman, and said that he had already assembled his coaching staff and had no desire to leave Chicago. In 1935, Harvard offered Shaughnessy a job as its head coach, which he seriously considered. Chicago moved to retain him, possibly with a salary increase, and the Harvard job ultimately went to former Western Maryland coach Dick Harlow.

After breaking even in each of his first three seasons, Shaughnessy's Chicago teams suffered a losing record each year from 1936 to 1939. Chicago finished the 1939 season with a 2–6 record and were winless in the Big Ten Conference. The Maroons were outscored by their opponents, 308–37, and failed to tally in each loss. These included routs by Michigan, 85–0; Ohio State, 61–0; Illinois, 46–0; Harvard, 61–0; and Virginia, 47–0. President Hutchins, who hated the sport and said "there is no doubt that football has been a major handicap to education in the United States", successfully pushed to have the program disbanded. He said, "I did not de-emphasize football at the University of Chicago, I abolished it." Hutchins hoped the move would set an example for other universities to follow, but this did not occur.

Shaughnessy could have remained at Chicago, where he held a "lifetime sinecure" as a physical education professor and earned a comfortable salary of $7,500 ($173,594 adjusted for inflation), but he was intent on continuing to coach. He described football as his passion and hobby. His final record at Chicago was 17–34–4.

During his coaching tenure at the University of Chicago, Shaughnessy befriended George Halas, the owner and coach of the Chicago Bears. In 1930, Halas had hired Ralph Jones, the athletic director and football coach at nearby Lake Forest College, who had been his freshman coach at the University of Illinois in 1914. Under head coach Robert Zuppke, Illinois employed the T formation in "its most rudimentary form". With the Bears, Jones experimented with the old T formation, and he spread the linemen, pushed out one receiver, and used a back as a man in motion, the latter usually being Red Grange. While these changes were innovative, they were not game-changing, and the T was used to complement the single-wing offense rather than replace it. In 1935, Shaughnessy described to Halas his vision of the T formation that used "hidden ball stuff, but with power". He had not employed it at the University of Chicago because he lacked the players to execute it. In 1937, Shaughnessy began to work part-time as a consultant to the Bears for $2,000 per year ($44,792 adjusted for inflation). In that capacity, he helped refine the T formation and analyzed scouting reports. The Bears continued to experiment with the T, and after Shaughnessy left Chicago, the formation became the club's standard offensive formation in 1940. The media has sometimes erroneously credited Shaughnessy for the invention of the T formation. The Associated Press wrote that "he was, however, undeniably the father of the modern T-attack." Shaughnessy himself called it the oldest formation in football.

=== Stanford ===
In 1939, the Stanford Indians posted a 1–7–1 record to finish last in the Pacific Coast Conference, which resulted in the relief of head coach Tiny Thornhill. At the time, the 1939 Stanford Indians were considered the worst team to have ever represented the university. After the season, Stanford unsuccessfully attempted to hire Missouri coach Don Faurot. During the job search, Stanford officials were surprised to learn how well regarded Shaughnessy, a coach of only occasionally successful squads, was amongst his peers. Many considered him as a "mad scientist" of football experimentation. In January 1940, Stanford University awarded a five-year contract to Shaughnessy as its head football coach, passing over predicted frontrunner John Bain Sutherland. The move surprised even Shaughnessy, who said, "I didn't expect it."

Many Stanford alumni were upset with the decision to hire Shaughnessy. The most popular candidates for the vacant position were two Stanford alumni themselves: San Jose State coach Dudley DeGroot, and Santa Clara coach Buck Shaw. Some believed the Shaughnessy hiring was a ploy to eventually eliminate football at the school, as had happened at both Loyola and Chicago the year prior. The Bay Area media mocked the Shaughnessy hiring as comically inept. They believed that a prestigious academic school had foolishly hired an inveterate loser as its head coach. Prescott Sulivan of the San Francisco Examiner and Jack McDonald of the San Francisco Call-Bulletin coined the nickname "Soup" for Shaughnessy, which they sarcastically explained was a diminutive for the word "super". Sullivan wrote, "We have heard it said that Shaughnessy has developed the knack of losing to the point where, with him, it is an exact science. In light of his record, we aren't at all surprised at this." The Stanford players were also skeptical of Shaughnessy's abilities. Center Milt Vucinich said, "We'd been reading about all those beatings Shaughnessy's men had taken, so we were joking among ourselves that wasn't it just like Stanford to hire somebody like this to coach us."

Although Stanford had fared poorly during the previous seasons, Thornhill had left behind a team with a talented roster, which included 24 returning lettermen. Shaughnessy believed the players were good, but unsuited to the single-wing offense that his predecessor had employed. Perhaps most importantly, Shaughnessy inherited back Frankie Albert, whom he considered a prototypical T formation quarterback. In 1943, Shaughnessy wrote that he considered the 1940 Stanford backfield—quarterback Frankie Albert, fullback Norm Standlee, right halfback Hugh Gallarneau, and left halfback Pete Kmetovic—as the greatest in history. While he believed the Indians backfield was better than any such combination in the single-wing, double-wing, short punt, or box formations, he added the caveat that this held true only in the Stanford players' employment in the T-formation.

Shaughnessy assembled a competent coaching staff in line coach Phil Bengtson and backfield coach Marchmont Schwartz. He also hired former Chicago Bears quarterback Bernie Masterson to mentor Frankie Albert. Shaughnessy's version of the T formation relied on motion and deception, and therefore differed from its earlier 19th-century incarnations, such as that used by Amos Alonzo Stagg at the University of Chicago, which emphasized power. In contrast to the single-wing, the new T did not use massed blocking formations for the ball-carrier. Instead, it utilized "brush blocking", where the linemen would only need to block a defender for one or two seconds. This scheme greatly reduced the disadvantage of an undersized line. Also different from the single-wing, the direct snap and position of the backs in the T formation shielded the ball from the view of defenders. This allowed for far more effective deception. Shaughnessy reportedly drew inspiration for his strategy from the Panzer tactics of Wehrmacht general Heinz Guderian.

Most sportswriters, unfamiliar with the T formation, called it the "Shaughnessy Formation" or "Shaughnessy's new razzle-dazzle attacks." Bill Leiser of the San Francisco Chronicle referred to it correctly when he wrote:

No one knows for sure what kind of football the Indians will play from this new T-Formation ... They start from the Notre Dame T and then stop looking like Notre Dame because they don't shift at all and never do get into the famous box formation. The man-in-motion may stop anywhere on the field. He changes the formation. [Quarterback Frankie] Albert parks himself right behind the center and takes the ball directly from his hands on nearly all plays. It's football unlike any previously played on the Coast.

==== 1940 season ====
The team conducted intense preparations during the spring and fall practices before the 1940 season. On one occasion, Stanford athletic director Al Masters angrily complained that the maintenance department had left on the practice field lights, only to be told that the team was still practicing. In one scrimmage, the varsity offense managed only a single touchdown against the freshman team, which prompted Shaughnessy to secretly draft a single-wing playbook in the event that the T formation failed.

The 1940 season opened with Stanford facing the University of San Francisco Dons at Kezar Stadium as part of the first-ever major college football doubleheader. It also featured Santa Clara and Utah, but despite its unusual nature, the event was overshadowed by a concurrent game deemed much more significant between California and Michigan in nearby Berkeley. After Santa Clara defeated Utah, 34–14, the Stanford game began at 3:30 p.m. It started off sloppily, and the Indians failed to advance the ball in their first two possessions. In their third series, however, Albert connected with an uncovered receiver, Hugh Gallarneau, for a 17-yard pass. Fullback Norm Standlee then rushed for 20 yards. Halfback Pete Kmetovic ran untouched up the middle for the game's first touchdown. Stanford went on to win, 27–0, and outgained San Francisco by a margin of 247 yards to eight. After the game, San Francisco head coach George Malley said, "We were baffled, naturally, by all that running around in the backfield." After the game, convinced that the T formation worked, Shaughnessy discarded the single-wing playbook he had drafted.

The following week, Stanford defeated Oregon, 13–0. The Indians then beat Santa Clara, 7–6, which was the Broncos' only loss of the season. Stanford rallied to beat 19th-ranked Washington State, 24–13. A week later, the Indians defeated their fifth unbeaten opponent, 17th-ranked Southern California, 21–7. They continued on to beat UCLA, 20–14; 11th-ranked Washington, 20–10; 19th-ranked Oregon State, 28–14; and California, 13–7. Stanford, with a perfect 9–0 record, secured the Pacific Coast Conference championship and an invitation to the 1941 Rose Bowl, where they faced seventh-ranked Nebraska. The Indians won, 21–13, with the final score coming on a 39-yard punt return by Kmetovic.

Before the Rose Bowl, Shaughnessy lent help to his old associate George Halas of the Chicago Bears, which in Sid Luckman, had found a quarterback well suited to the T formation. Before the NFL Championship Game against the Washington Redskins, Shaughnessy devised a series of counter plays to confuse their opponent, which on game film had shown a tendency to shift linebackers in the direction of the motion man. His preparations helped Chicago rout Washington, 73–0.

At the end of the season, the Poling System named Stanford the national champions, and in later years, the Billingsley Report and Helms Athletic Foundation did likewise retroactively. Shaughnessy was voted the Scripps-Howard Coach of the Year by a wide margin, and Albert and Gallarneau were named to All-America first teams. The media nicknamed the 1940 squad the "Wow Boys", a play on their impressive feats and the earlier Stanford "Vow Boys", which were named for their promise to never lose to Southern California.

Stanford's and the Chicago Bears' unexpected success with the modern T formation prompted coaches around the nation to adopt it. Shaughnessy and Halas taught coaching clinics, and Bears quarterback Sid Luckman installed the formation at his alma mater, Columbia. Luckman also helped implement the T on national championship teams at both Army and Notre Dame. By 1944, more than half of the country's football teams at the collegiate and professional level were using the T. In 1949, the Pittsburgh Steelers were the only NFL team still using the single-wing. The T formation led to numerous derivatives, many of which remain in use today, including the power I, pro set, veer, wishbone, split T, wing T, and West Coast offense.

==== 1941 season ====
Shaughnessy made the "pessimistic" prediction of at least two losses for his 1941 squad, which lost Gallarneau and Standlee to graduation. His forecast proved accurate, as injuries took their toll, and the team lost to Oregon State, Washington State, and California to finish with a 6–3 record. After the Indians fell in their penultimate game, Stanford, Washington, and Oregon State were tied for first-place in the Pacific Coast Conference with two losses each. California's upset win over Stanford, 16–0, in the finale ensured that Oregon State received the Rose Bowl bid.

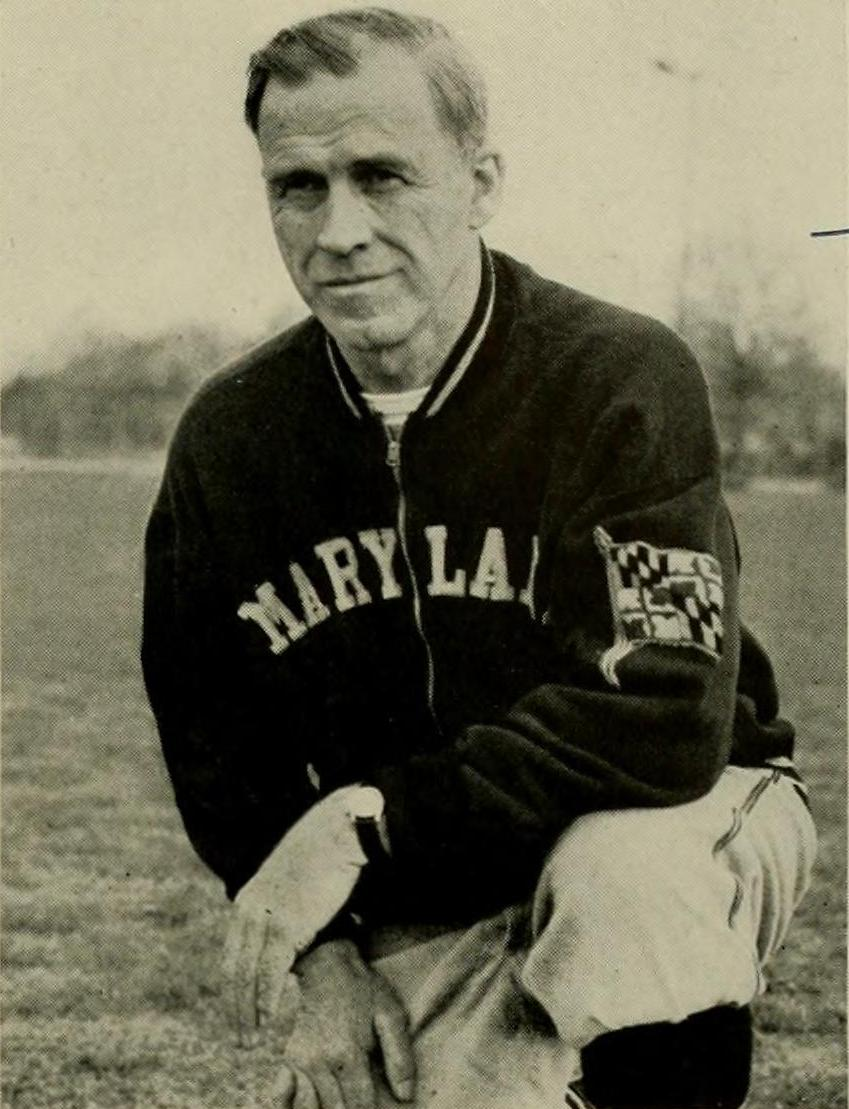
Shaughnessy after taking over at Maryland in 1946

In February 1942, Shaughnessy traveled to Yale University, which was considering three candidates for its vacant head coaching position. A month later, he said he was not interested in Yale, but that he might move to an unnamed Eastern school with little football tradition. Shaughnessy resigned in March 1942 to move to Maryland. A 1977 Sports Illustrated article reported that he decided to leave when he realized Stanford might discontinue its football program during World War II. He expressed disappointment about leaving, but believed the new job would provide a challenge. Maryland reportedly offered the same salary as Stanford, $9,000 ($177,342 adjusted for inflation), and a position on its faculty.

=== First stint at Maryland ===
At Maryland, Shaughnessy served as the head football coach, athletic director, and director of physical education, under a "lifetime contract". Shaughnessy introduced a red and white color scheme for the Maryland uniforms, which replaced the longstanding combination of black and gold. He installed the T formation, and mentored quarterback Tommy Mont, whom he compared favorably with Frankie Albert. He also praised Terrapins fullback Jack Wright and likened him to Norm Standlee. In 1942, the Terrapins amassed a 7–2 record under Shaughnessy, and the Associated Press assessed it was a "pretty fair ball club". Mont finished the season as one of the top three passers in the nation. After the season, Shaughnessy left Maryland for Pittsburgh, a move he later called, "the worst thing I ever did."

=== Pittsburgh ===
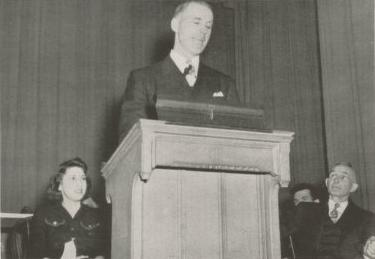
Shaughnessy's inaugural address of the Pitt student body

In 1943, Shaughnessy replaced Pittsburgh head coach Charles W. Bowser, who had applied for a commission in the United States Navy. The University of Pittsburgh had de-emphasized football, a move with which Shaughnessy said he was in accordance. He also said he would not guarantee any number of wins as coach. During this time, Shaughnessy had to contend with the loss of players to the wartime draft. At Pittsburgh, his teams compiled a 10–17 record from 1943 to 1945 without a winning season. In 1943, the National Safety Council honored him with an award for "developing and applying coaching methods that provide maximum protection for the players."

In March 1944, Washington Redskins owner George Preston Marshall hired Shaughnessy as an advisor, a position he held concurrently with his duties at Pittsburgh. He mentored new head coach Dudley DeGroot in the T formation, in which quarterback Sammy Baugh excelled. Pittsburgh, however, disapproved of his affiliation with the professional franchise.

=== Second stint at Maryland ===
In February 1946, Shaughnessy accepted an offer to return to Maryland amidst mounting criticism at Pittsburgh, which included the threat of resignation from assistant coaches Charles Hartwig, Bobby Hoel and Stan Olenn. University of Maryland president Dr. H. C. Byrd, himself a former football coach, called Shaughnessy one of the top-three coaches in the nation. Shaughnessy complained that he was not given a fair chance to succeed at Pittsburgh and that controversy over his role with the Redskins was without basis. The Pittsburgh athletic board had recommended Shaughnessy be retained as coach if he resigned from the Redskins, but he refused.

Shaughnessy said, "The funny part of it is that I gave Maryland the roughest deal I have ever given anyone in my life, and when Dr. [Byrd] offered me a chance to come back, I accepted." Because of his repeated job changes, the Associated Press dubbed Shaugnessy "football's man in motion". At Maryland, he replaced Bear Bryant who had departed for Kentucky. Shaughnessy reintroduced his preferred red and white uniforms, which again replaced the black and gold scheme and remained the dominant colors until 1987.

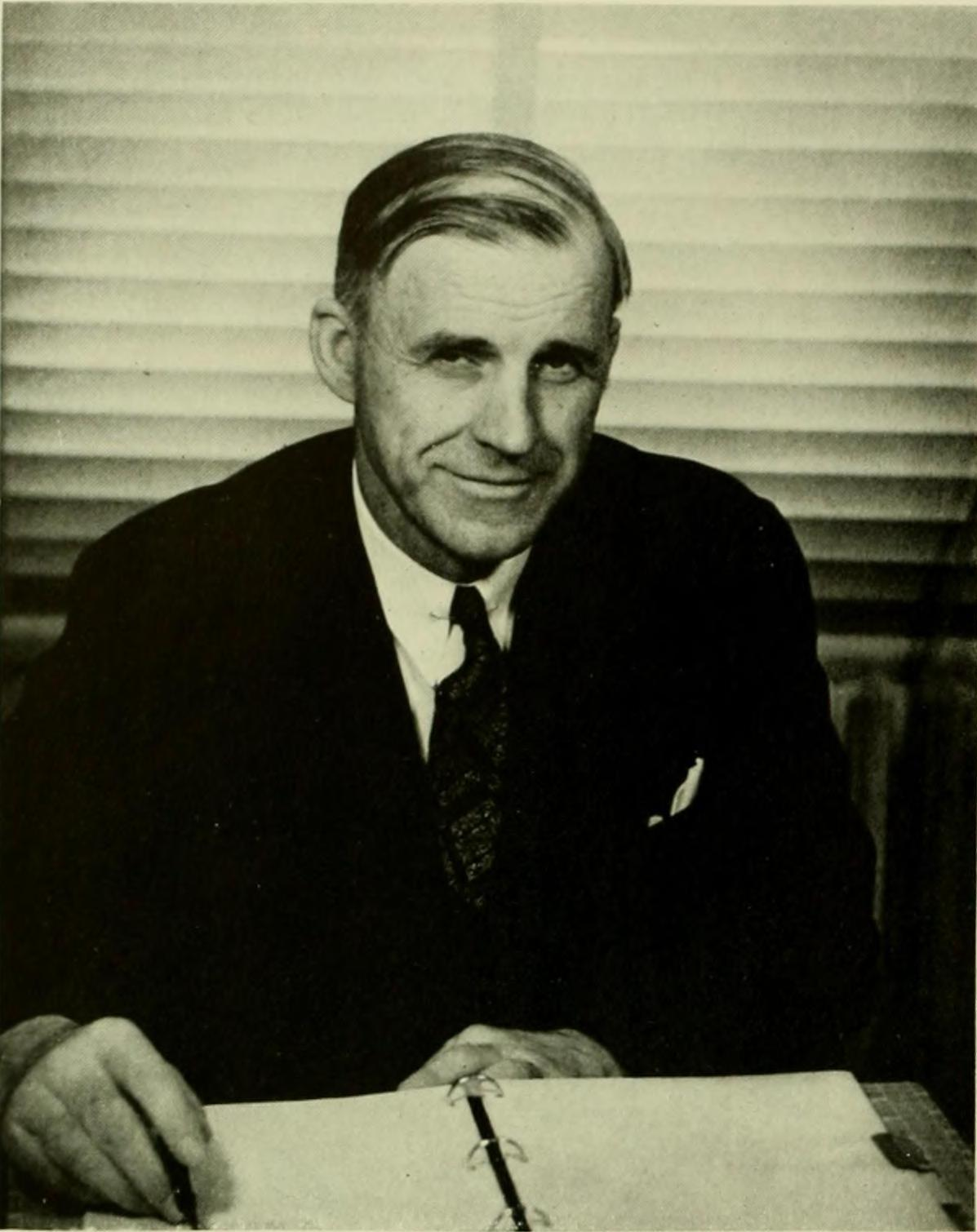
Shaughnessy after his return to Maryland in 1946

His return to Maryland was far less successful than his first stint. The Terrapins amassed a 3–6 record in 1946. In November, he claimed a Washington Post story misquoted him as calling some of his ex-servicemen players "bums". The same article reported he would be fired at the end of the season. The Post ran another quote that Shaughnessy admitted was accurate: "There are some boys on this team who would have been fired a long time ago by another coach for their personal conduct."

After the season, it was rumored that the Redskins were interested in promoting him to replace head coach Turk Edwards, but the franchise denied it and Shaughnessy would not comment on his plans. In January 1947, he quit as Maryland coach, stating that he did not want to remain athletic director or resign from the Washington Redskins, both of which the school wanted. Shaughnessy said he would work full-time for the Redskins for the remaining year on his contract, and might return to coach only college football at the end of his term, possibly with Maryland. President Byrd affirmed that Shaughnessy's poor 1946 record was not related to his departure. He was replaced by split T proponent Jim Tatum.

=== Los Angeles Rams ===
In 1948, Shaughnessy joined the Los Angeles Rams as a "technical advisor" to head coach Bob Snyder. In the preseason, owner Dan Reeves was so impressed with Shaughnessy that Reeves promoted him to head coach and fired Snyder. At Los Angeles, Shaughnessy developed the pro set that used a three wide receiver set. He made this change to capitalize on running back Elroy "Crazy Legs" Hirsch, who he thought would make a better flanker. Los Angeles captured the Western Conference Championship in 1949.

Reeves fired Shaughnessy after two seasons, because he had created "internal friction". One source explained that Shaughnessy's eccentricities and continuously expanding playbook had taken its toll on the players. He was replaced by assistant coach Joe Stydahar. Shaughnessy said, "Stydahar coach the Rams? I could take a high school team and beat him." Stydahar, however, led the Rams to the National Conference Championship that season, and the team set numerous NFL passing and scoring records.

=== Chicago Bears ===
In 1951, Shaughnessy was rumored as a candidate for the vacant Washington Redskins head coaching job, but nothing came of it. From 1951 to 1962, Shaughnessy served on the staff of the Chicago Bears as a technical advisor, vice president, and defensive specialist. Halas retained responsibility for the offense, including the Bears' T formation. Ironically, Shaughnessy was tasked with developing a defense to counter the T formation. One of his solutions was the 5–3–3 defense, which left outside linebackers available to defend against end runs and passes in the flat.

In 1954, Shaughnessy attended the Blue–Gray Game in Montgomery, Alabama, scouting specifically for flankers. Jacksonville State assistant Ray Wedgeworth told him the best receiver in the state was not playing in the game: Harlon Hill of Florence State Teachers' College. Shaughnessy requested game film from Hill's coach, and eventually, the Bears selected him with their 15th round pick in the 1954 NFL draft. That season, Hill was named NFL Rookie of the Year, and in his second season he was named the NEA NFL MVP.

In October 1961, the Bears—utilizing Shaughnessy's complex, shifting defensive alignments—stifled San Francisco 49ers coach Red Hickey's new shotgun formation, 31–0. Chicago had learned lessons against the Baltimore Colts who had attempted to use the shotgun the previous week. Shaughnessy explained his Chicago defensive scheme in November 1961:

We can adjust to fit three things. We have defenses to fit the [offense] we face, the personnel we face and the situation in the game. Bill George calls the basic overall defense. Then Fred Williams calls the defense for the rush men. Richie Petitbon calls the defense for the backs. All of these are real bright boys, and they do a great job.

Shaughnessy mentored middle linebacker Bill George as the defensive play-caller. Bears coach Abe Gibron likened George to having Shaughnessy himself on the field. Shaughnessy worked to counter the increasing use of the forward pass. He emphasized man-to-man coverage, dropped linebackers or defensive ends into pass coverage, and utilized blitzes from multiple directions—which had previously consisted mostly of just a middle linebacker.

Former Chicago Bears head coach Hunk Anderson gave a highly critical account of his interactions with Shaughnessy in Notre Dame, Chicago Bears, and Hunk Anderson. He described one incident, during a game against the Cleveland Browns, where Shaughnessy implored Anderson to call an "end run". Anderson, thinking he noticed a vulnerability to exploit, asked which end run and which blocking assignments to use. Shaughnessy replied that any end run would do. Anderson asked in disgust for Shaughnessy to sit down and watch the rest of the game. He explained that the Bears had 28 different end runs to each side for each of the four backs, each of which had numerous blocking schemes. He added, "You just can't say 'any end run' ... You have to choose one." Anderson also claimed Shaughnessy plagiarized plays from other coaches, renamed them, and claimed them as his own.

At the end of the 1962 season, Shaughnessy tendered his resignation with a year remaining on his contract. He expressed regret in his departure and admiration for Halas, but said that he felt it was time for a change.

=== Hawaii ===
Shaughnessy briefly returned to coaching in 1965 when he took over at Hawaii, where the football program was "in a moribund state" and "close to extinction". Hawaii amassed a 1–8–1 record during Shaughnessy's only season, but the Associated Press credited him with reviving the program. He was replaced by the school's first full-time coach, Phil Sarboe.

== Personal life ==
In December 1917, he married L. Mae, with whom he had one son and two daughters: Clark Shaughnessy Jr.; Janice Shaughnessy, and Marcia Wilson. He met his wife in New Orleans while coaching at Tulane. A teetotaler, Shaughnessy held a negative opinion of both drinkers and smokers. Marchmont Schwartz noted, "When he said, 'Let's go have a drink,' he meant, 'Let's go drink a milk shake ... He disappointed a lot of newspapermen that way." Aside from his declared hobby as a football coach and experimenter, he enjoyed long-distance driving. Shaughnessy preferred to devise plays late at night, between midnight and dawn, while his household slept. A 1977 Sports Illustrated article described him as an "ascetic" and his lifestyle as "Spartan". It noted he would go to bed as early as 7 o'clock, and wake up for work at three or four in the morning.

Shaughnessy did not take criticism well. In one incident, he demanded that a critical columnist leave a Northern California Football Writers' Association meeting. During a 1945 press conference while coach at Pittsburgh, Shaughnessy responded to criticism that he had been too conservative in a 6–0 win over Temple and taken too many risks in a 39–9 loss to Notre Dame. He said, "You tell me what to do. Shall we play a conservative game—hold down the score and play to look good—or shall we gamble, depending on a freak chance to win but losing by a big score if we fail?"

After he joined the Chicago Bears' staff, sportswriter Roger Treat said, "I always looked upon Clark Shaughnessy as a conscientious idealist who might better have followed the trail of Father Flanagan of Boys Town. He may never be entirely happy in the jovial thuggery of pro football, where every man has a little assassin in him." Illinois head coach Robert Zuppke said, "The world lost the greatest undertaker when Clark Shaughnessy decided on football coaching."

Shaughnessy's grandson is Grateful Dead drummer Bill Kreutzmann. His son Clark Shaughnessy Jr. was an All-American javelin thrower for the UCLA Bruins track and field team, finishing 6th at the 1938 NCAA track and field championships.

== Later life ==
Shaughnessy retired to Santa Monica, California. On May 4, 1970, he was admitted to Santa Monica Hospital suffering from hypertension. He died there at the age of 78 on May 15.

The College Football Hall of Fame inducted Shaughnessy in 1968. Shaughnessy was a semifinalist in the 2010 Pro Football Hall of Fame class, but was not selected. Shaughnessy had been a finalist for induction in 1970, 1975, and 1976, but fell short in the voting each time. He was inducted into the University of Minnesota "M" Club Hall of Fame in 2010, the Tulane University Athletics Hall of Fame in 1977, and the Stanford University Athletic Hall of Fame.

== Published works ==
- The Modern "T" Formation with Man-in-Motion, Clark Shaughnessy, Ralph Jones, and George Halas, Chicago, 1941.
- Football in War & Peace, Clark Shaughnessy, Clinton, SC: Jacobs Press, 1943.

== Head coaching record ==
=== College football ===
Year	Team	Overall	Conference	Standing	Bowl/playoffs	AP^{#}
Tulane Olive and Blue / Green Wave (Southern Intercollegiate Athletic Association) (1915–1920)
1915	Tulane	4–4	3–3	T–10th		
1916	Tulane	4–3–1	2–1–1	9th		
1917	Tulane	5–3	2–1	6th		
1918	Tulane	4–1–1	0–0	NA		
1919	Tulane	6–2–1	3–1–1	T–6th		
1920	Tulane	6–2–1	4–0	T–1st		
Tulane Green Wave (Southern Conference) (1922–1926)
1922	Tulane	4–4	1–4	18th		
1923	Tulane	6–3–1	2–2–1	T–11th		
1924	Tulane	8–1	4–1	4th		
1925	Tulane	9–0–1	5–0	T–1st		
1926	Tulane	3–5–1	2–4	T–15th		
Tulane:		59–28–7	28–17–3			
Loyola Wolf Pack (Southern Intercollegiate Athletic Association) (1927)
1927	Loyola	6–2–2	1–0–1	7th		
Loyola Wolf Pack (Independent) (1928–1929)
1928	Loyola	7–3				
1929	Loyola	4–5–2				
Loyola Wolf Pack (Southern Intercollegiate Athletic Association) (1930–1932)
1930	Loyola	9–1	2–0	T–4th		
1931	Loyola	5–4	2–1	10th		
1932	Loyola	6–4–1	2–0	T–4th		
Loyola:		37–19–5	7–1–1			
Chicago Maroons (Big Ten Conference) (1933–1939)
1933	Chicago	3–3–2	0–3–2	T–8th		
1934	Chicago	4–4	2–4	7th		
1935	Chicago	4–4	2–3	T–7th		
1936	Chicago	2–5–1	1–4	7th		
1937	Chicago	1–6	0–4	9th		
1938	Chicago	1–6–1	0–4	10th		
1939	Chicago	2–6	0–3	10th		
Chicago:		17–34–4	5–25–2			
Stanford Indians (Pacific Coast Conference) (1940–1941)
1940	Stanford	10–0	7–0	1st	W Rose	2
1941	Stanford	6–3	4–3	4th		
Stanford:		16–3	11–3			
Maryland Terrapins (Southern Conference) (1942)
1942	Maryland	7–2	1–2	T–12th		
Pittsburgh Panthers (Independent) (1943–1945)
1943	Pittsburgh	3–5				
1944	Pittsburgh	4–5				
1945	Pittsburgh	3–7				
Pittsburgh:		10–17				
Maryland Terrapins (Southern Conference) (1946)
1946	Maryland	3–6	2–5	12th		
Maryland:		10–8	3–7			
Hawaii Rainbows (NCAA College Division independent) (1965)
1965	Hawaii	1–8–1				
Hawaii:		1–8–1				
Total:		150–117–17				
National championship Conference title Conference division title or championship game berth
^{#}Rankings from final AP Poll.

=== Professional football ===
Team	Year	Regular season					Postseason			
Team	Year	Won	Lost	Ties	Win %	Finish	Won	Lost	Win %	Result
LA	1948	6	5	1	.545	3rd in NFL Western	–	–	–	–
LA	1949	8	2	2	.800	1st in NFL Western	0	1	.000	Lost to Philadelphia Eagles in NFL Championship.
LA Total		14	7	3	.667		0	1	.000	–
NFL Total		14	7	3	.667		0	1	.000	–
Total		14	7	3	.667		0	1	.000	–
