= Pete Kmetovic =

American football player (1919–1990)

- Kmetovic in 1950

No. 27, 45
- Position: Halfback

Personal information
- Born: December 27, 1919; San Jose, California, U.S.
- Died: February 8, 1990 (aged 70); Palo Alto, California, U.S.
- Listed height: 5 ft 9 in (1.75 m)
- Listed weight: 175 lb (79 kg)

Career information
- High school: San José
- College: Stanford (1938-1941)
- NFL draft: 1942: 1st round, 3rd overall pick

Career history

Playing
- Philadelphia Eagles (1946); Detroit Lions (1947)

Coaching
- San Bernardino (1948) Head coach; San Francisco (1949) Backfield coach; Stanford (1950–1962) Assistant coach

Awards and highlights
- 2× First-team All-PCC (1940, 1941)

Career NFL statistics
- Rushing yards: 53
- Rushing average: 2.8
- Receptions: 10
- Receiving yards: 211
- Total touchdowns: 2
- Stats at Pro Football Reference

Head coaching record
- Career: 3–5–1 (.389)

Peter George Kmetovic (Pronounced: "Kuh-MET-o-vick") (December 27, 1919 – February 8, 1990) was an American professional football player and coach. A high school football star and acclaimed track and field sprinter, as a junior Kmetovic was the starting left halfback for the undefeated 1940 Stanford University team, remembered as "The Wow Boys," leading the squad in scoring and yards per carry. The team's season culminated with a victory in the 1941 Rose Bowl over the Nebraska Cornhuskers, with Kmetovic named as Player of the Game.

Although selected third overall in the 1942 NFL draft, due to World War II Kmetovic was not able to play in the National Football League (NFL) until 1946, missing four complete seasons. He ultimately played in just 16 professional games, primarily as a reserve, as a member of the Philadelphia Eagles in 1946 and the Detroit Lions in 1947.

== Biography ==
=== Early life ===
Pete Kmetovic was born on December 27, 1919 in San Jose, California. He attended San José High School in that city, where he distinguished himself as a track and field sprinter, turning in a 10.1 second time in the 100-yard dash at one meet in the spring of 1936. He also ran the distance in a wind-assisted time of 10.0 that same season. His performance in the 4x100 relay won San Jose the Peninsula Athletic League (PAL) title over Palo Alto High School that month.

Regarded as one of the two fastest sprinters competing in the PAL during his junior year of 1936, Kmetovic also played football for the Bulldogs, starting at the fullback position. He was a feared and effective punt returner and used his speed to great advantage on the defensive side of the ball, with one newspaper reporter noting that "Little Pete" had befuddled the locals with "long, scintillating sprints downfield" and "broke up a tricky aerial offense with interceptions."

Kmetovic was named to the All-PAL team for three seasons. He was named first team left halfback and captain of the 11 man All-PAL team in 1936 by the seven coaches of the league, equivalent to Most Valuable Player honors.

He continued to run track in the spring of 1937 and 1938, competing regionally at a high level in the 100 and 220 yard events.

=== College career ===
Kmetovic graduated in June of 1938 and enrolled at Stanford University in September. In this era the National Collegiate Athletic Association (NCAA) required students attend a university for one year prior to playing varsity football, so Kmetovic found himself one of 60 prospects trying to win a spot on the school's freshman team. He was listed at a height of 5'8½" and a weight of 168 pounds at the time he first joined the team.

Kmetovic as a Stanford backfield star, 1940.

Kmetovic found his place on the squad, starting at right halfback in the team's single-wing offense. In an offense running through future varsity teammate single-wing fullback Frankie Albert, Kmetovic was put to use as an effective pass receiver out of the backfield, helping the junior varsity drub their peers from University of Southern California 22–6 and run roughshod over junior college teams on their schedule.

In the spring of 1939, Kmetovic hung up the football pads and continued running track, running the 220 yard dash and the quarter-mile and earning accolades as a freshman team star. A foot injury during this inaugural season derailed his track career, however.

Future NFL players Albert and Kmetovic were promoted to the Stanford varsity by head coach Tiny Thornhill ahead of the fall 1939 season. Both were moved to the left halfback position, through which much of Thornhill's offense moved, with Albert the starter and Kmetovic his backup. Both sophomores performed admirably in fall practice, with Thornhill remarking to the press, "I don't know which is my first team."

The 1940 Stanford team would go down as among the most important offensive units of mid-century American football. New head coach Clark Shaughnessy, formerly with the University of Chicago, would import a new system — one being simultaneously employed by the NFL's Chicago Bears — the T formation with motion.

In the single-wing and the closely related double-wing formations, the ball would be shotgun-snapped to either the fullback or one of the two halfbacks, with the quarterback generally serving as a "blocking back." Under the T, offensive decisions ran through the quarterback, who took the ball under center and distributed it to one of the three backs arrayed behind him. Generally, one of the two halfbacks would go into motion immediately before the snap, running parallel with the line of scrimmage. Mismatches were thus generated as defenses remained befuddled how to stop the new form of offensive attack. Stanford prospered.

Nine regular season wins in a row were reeled off by the Stanford squad, starting with a 27–0 drubbing of the University of San Francisco, and including convincing wins over Southern California rivals UCLA and USC, both conference opponents from Oregon and Washington, and a dramatic 13 to 7 triumph over arch-rival Cal in The Big Game.

The undefeated 1940 Stanford team with its unorthodox offense captured the public imagination and its players were tagged "The Wow Boys" in the press. The team featured four future NFL players in the backfield — Albert, Kmetovic, Norm Standlee, and Hugh Gallarneau — as well as two pros on the line. Of these, Kmetovic was the leading scorer, with 10 touchdowns in 10 games, as well as the leader in yards rushing per carry, with 6.8. He was remembered as "extremely fast and shifty with a marvelous change of pace — a real breakaway artist who was a threat every time he got his hands on the ball." Playing both ways, offense and defense, Kmetovic was on the field for 452 minutes out of a possible 600 during Stanford's 10 games.

As conference champions, Stanford was the Pacific Coast Conference's representative to the 1941 Rose Bowl. Once again, Kmetovic proved his mettle, rushing for 141 yards and returning a punt 39-yards for a touchdown to lead the Indians to a 21–13 victory over Nebraska. For his efforts, Kmetovic was named the player of the game.

=== World War II ===
Kmetovic and Albert were not immediately sought for induction into the US military as in December 1941 both were classified 1-B for physical ailments. Albert's designation was the result of his having flat feet, while Kmetovic was downgraded for having false teeth and a broken nose — football-related infirmities. With World War II raging, Kmetovic attempted to join the military effort as an ensign in the US Navy Reserve in the physical training program in the wake of rumors that the Stanford University campus was to be converted into a training school for aviators.

Kmetovic's application was accepted, along with those of Frankie Albert and three other Stanford football teammates, and the group were slated to enter basic naval training at Norfolk Naval Air Station in Virginia in April. The physical training program in which they served was under the direction of lieutenant commander Gene Tunney, a former heavyweight boxing champion. Kmetovic was accepted and sworn in February 23, 1942.

Despite his position as a physical fitness trainer in the Navy, Kmetovic was not done with football. On August 28, 1942, Kmetovic played a game as part of the College All-Stars team that took on the reigning NFL Champion Chicago Bears. His former Stanford teammate Hugh Gallarneau, already with one year in the NFL for the Bears, scored a touchdown that helped the professionals to a 21–0 victory over the collegians.

Kmetovic was drafted by the Philadelphia Eagles in the first round of the 1942 NFL draft, with the team making him the third overall pick of that season's lottery. Due to the war, however, it was not until 1946 that Kmetovic was able to join that team.

Kmetovic spent the fall of 1942 at the Great Lakes Naval Training Station, located near Chicago, where he played service football for head coach lieutenant Tony Hinkle and the Bluejackets, one of the strongest teams in the country.

=== Professional career ===
Four NFL seasons were lost to Kmetovic due to the disruption of the war. In the summer of 1946, the former college star reported to training camp for the Eagles. Time had taken a toll, and Kmetovic found himself in a reserve role with the Eagles, seeing action in just 5 games, during which he carried the ball 5 times for 30 yards — 27 of which came through a single run. He additionally caught 4 passes for 38 yards out of the backfield during his first year in the league.

When he was with the Eagles, Kmetovic also worked as a football coach for a private prep school in Philadelphia.

In 1947 Kmetovic moved to the Detroit Lions, where he reprised his role as a substitute, playing in 11 games, only one of which he started. His statistics were again lackluster, with his 14 carries generating only 23 yards — an average of just 1.6 yards per tote. He was rather more effective as a pass receiver, fortunately, catching 6 balls for 143 yards with two touchdowns — the longest being a 53 yard grab.

=== Coaching career ===
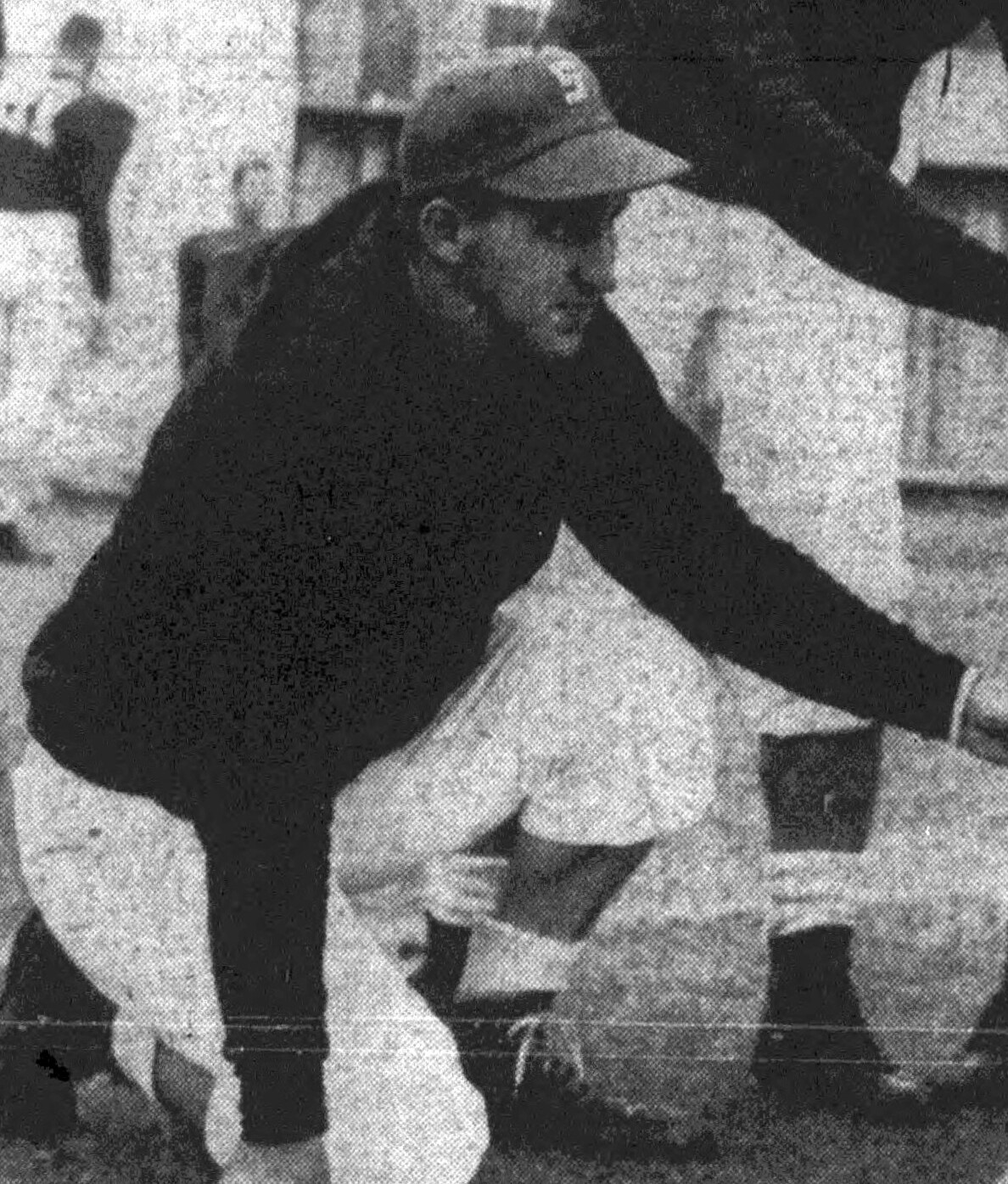
Kmetovic on the field with Stanford in 1951.

Kmetovic served as the head football coach at San Bernardino Valley College in 1948. The following year, he was hired as backfield coach at the University of San Francisco. In 1950, he returned to alma mater, Stanford, where he began a 13-year stint as an assistant coach under Marchmont Schwartz.

He was also head coach for the club sport of rugby at the school.

=== Death and legacy ===
Kmetovic died February 8, 1990 in Palo Alto, California. He was 70 years old at the time of his death.

== Head coaching record ==
Year	Team	Overall	Conference	Standing	Bowl/playoffs
San Bernardino Indians (Eastern Conference) (1948)
1948	San Bernardino	3–5–1	2–3–1	4th	
San Bernardino:		3–5–1	2–3–1		
Total:		3–5–1			
