= Vic Lindskog =

American football player and coach (1914–2003)

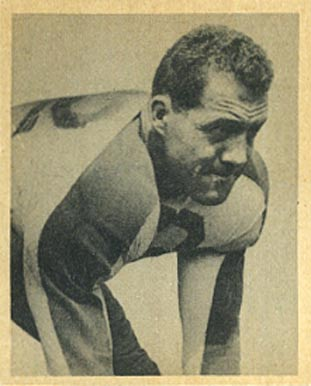
- Lindskog in 1948

No. 52
- Positions: Center, linebacker

Personal information
- Born: December 3, 1914; Roundup, Montana, U.S.
- Died: February 28, 2003 (aged 88); Fort Worth, Texas, U.S.
- Listed height: 6 ft 1 in (1.85 m)
- Listed weight: 203 lb (92 kg)

Career information
- High school: Roundup
- College: Santa Ana (1938–1939); Stanford (1940–1941)
- NFL draft: 1942: 2nd round, 13th overall pick

Career history

Playing
- Philadelphia Eagles (1944–1951)

Coaching
- Stanford (1942) Assistant coach; Maryland (1946) Assistant coach; Philadelphia Eagles (1952–1954) Line coach; BC Lions (1955–1958) Assistant coach; Bakersfield (1959) Assistant coach; Los Angeles Rams (1960–1962) Offensive line coach; Bakersfield (1963) Line coach

Awards and highlights
- As a player: 2× NFL champion (1948, 1949); First-team All-Pro (1951); National champion (1940); Second-team All-PCC (1940)

Career NFL statistics
- Games played: 78
- Games started: 52
- Interceptions: 4
- Interception yards: 112
- Fumble recoveries: 5
- Defensive touchdowns: 1
- Stats at Pro Football Reference

Victor Junior Lindskog (December 3, 1914 – February 28, 2003) was an American football player and coach. He played as center and linebacker for the Philadelphia Eagles of the National Football League (NFL) from 1944 to 1951. Lindskog played college football for the Stanford Indians and was selected by the Eagles in the second round of the 1942 NFL draft.

== Early life and college career ==
Lindskog was born in Roundup, Montana. He played junior college football at Santa Ana College from 1938 to 1939 and college football at Stanford University from 1940 to 1941, under head coach Clark Shaughnessy.

== Coaching career ==
Lindskog first coached as an assistant in 1942, at his alma mater, Stanford. In the summer of 1946, he briefly served as an assistant coach at the University of Maryland under Shaughnessy, but returned to the play with the Eagles that fall.

After retiring from the playing following the 1951 season, Lindskog remained with the Eagles from 1952 to 1954 as line coach. From 1955 to 1958, he was an assistant coach for the BC Lions. In 1959, he was hired as an assistant football and track and field at Bakersfield College in Bakersfield, California under Ray Newman. In 1960, Lindskog returned to the NFL as offensive line coach for the Los Angeles Rams under head coach Bob Waterfield. After three seasons with the Rams, he went back to Bakersfield, in 1963, as line coach. The following year, he was rehired by the Rams as a scout.

== Death ==
Lindskog died on February 28, 2003, in Fort Worth, Texas.
