= Marchmont Schwartz =

American football player and coach (1909–1991)

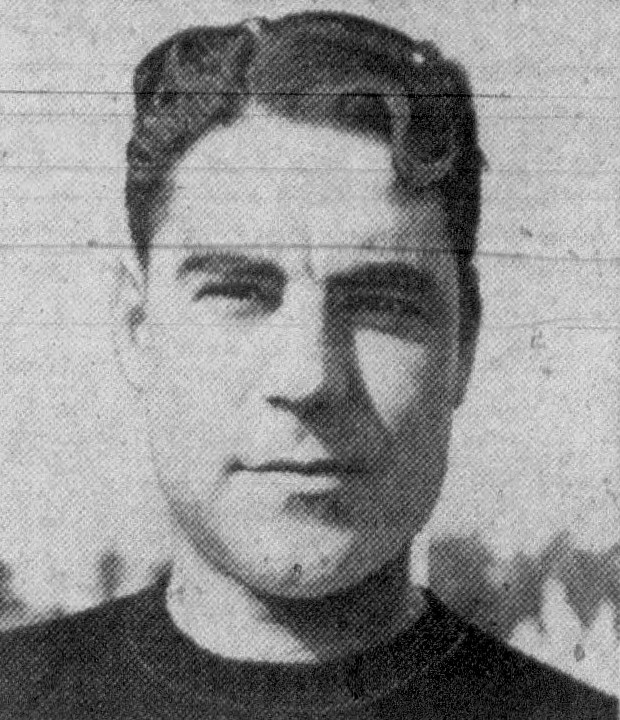
- Schwartz, circa 1942

Biographical details
- Born: March 20, 1909; New Orleans, Louisiana, U.S.
- Died: April 18, 1991 (aged 82); Danville, California, U.S.

Playing career
- 1929–1931: Notre Dame
- Position: Halfback

Coaching career (HC unless noted)
- 1932–1933: Notre Dame (assistant)
- 1934: Chicago (assistant)
- 1935–1939: Creighton
- 1940–1941: Stanford (backfield)
- 1942–1950: Stanford

Administrative career (AD unless noted)
- 1935–1939: Creighton

Head coaching record
- Overall: 47–50–6
- Bowls: 1–0

Accomplishments and honors

Championships
- 1 MVC (1936)

Awards
- Unanimous All-American (1931); Consensus All-American (1930)
- College Football Hall of Fame; Inducted in 1974 (profile)

Marchmont H. "Marchy" Schwartz (March 20, 1909 – April 18, 1991) was an American college football player and coach. He played football at the University of Notre Dame from 1929 to 1931, and was a two-time All-American at halfback. Schwartz served as the head football coach at Creighton University from 1935 to 1939 and at Stanford University from 1942 to 1950, compiling a career college football coaching record of 47–50–6; Stanford, like may other universities, suspended football during World War II. He was inducted into the College Football Hall of Fame as a player in 1974.

== Early life and playing career ==
Schwartz was of Jewish heritage, and was a graduate of Saint Stanislaus College high school in Bay St. Louis, Mississippi. From 1929 to 1930, he led Notre Dame, coached by Knute Rockne, to a 19–0 record and consecutive national championships. In a game against Carnegie Tech in 1931, he rushed for 188 yards, including touchdown runs of 58 and 60 yards.

== Coaching career ==
Schwartz served as an assistant football coach at Notre Dame from 1932 to 1933 under Heartley Anderson, and at the University of Chicago in 1934 under Clark Shaughnessy. In 1940, Shaughnessy hired Schwartz as Stanford's backfield coach. He helped coach the 1940 "Wow Boys" that recorded a perfect season and won the 1941 Rose Bowl.

== Death ==
Schwartz died on April 18, 1991, in Danville, California, to which he had retired, at age 82.

== Head coaching record ==
Year	Team	Overall	Conference	Standing	Bowl/playoffs	AP^{#}
Creighton Bluejays (Missouri Valley Conference) (1935–1939)
1935	Creighton	3–5–1	2–2–1	3rd		
1936	Creighton	4–4	3–0	T–1st		
1937	Creighton	2–7	1–3	T–6th		
1938	Creighton	6–1–1	1–0–1	3rd		
1939	Creighton	4–5	2–4	6th		
Creighton:		19–22–2	9–11–2			
Stanford Indians (Pacific Coast Conference) (1942–1950)
1942	Stanford	6–4	5–2	3rd		12
1943	No team—World War II					
1944	No team—World War II					
1945	No team—World War II					
1946	Stanford	6–3–1	3–3–1	5th		
1947	Stanford	0–9	0–7	10th		
1948	Stanford	4–6	3–4	5th		
1949	Stanford	7–3–1	4–2	T–3rd	W Pineapple	
1950	Stanford	5–3–2	2–2–2	T–4th		
Stanford:		28–28–4				
Total:		47–50–6				
^{#}Rankings from final AP Poll.
