= 1940 Oregon State Beavers football team =

American college football season

1940 Oregon State Beavers football
- Conference: Pacific Coast Conference
- Record: 5–3–1 (4–3–1 PCC)
- Head coach: Lon Stiner (8th season)
- Home stadium: Bell Field

1940 Pacific Coast Conference football standings
	Conf.					Overall
Team	W		L		T	W		L		T
No. 2 Stanford $	7	–	0	–	0	10	–	0	–	0
No. 10 Washington	7	–	1	–	0	7	–	2	–	0
Oregon State	4	–	3	–	1	5	–	3	–	1
Washington State	3	–	4	–	2	4	–	4	–	2
Oregon	3	–	4	–	1	4	–	4	–	1
California	3	–	4	–	0	4	–	6	–	0
USC	2	–	3	–	2	3	–	4	–	2
Montana	1	–	2	–	0	4	–	4	–	1
UCLA	1	–	6	–	0	1	–	9	–	0
Idaho	0	–	4	–	0	1	–	7	–	1
$ – Conference champion; Rankings from AP Poll

The 1940 Oregon State Beavers football team represented Oregon State College—now known as Oregon State University as a member of the Pacific Coast Conference (PCC) during the 1940 college football season. Led by eighth-year head coach Lon Stiner, the Beavers compiled an overall record of 5–3–1 with a mark of 4–3–1 in conference play, placing third in the PCC. Oregon State scored 128 points and allowed 80 points on the season. The team played home games at Bell Field in Corvallis, Oregon.

The 1940 Oregon State squad finished the season ranked at No. 36 (out of 697 college football teams) under the Litkenhous Difference by Score system for 1940 and at No. 51 according to the Azziratem System favored by Illustrated Football Annual magazine.

== Schedule ==
Date	Opponent	Rank	Site	Result	Attendance	Source
September 28	Idaho		Bell Field; Corvallis, OR	W 41–0	6,500	
October 5	at USC		Los Angeles Coliseum; Los Angeles, CA	T 0–0	40,000	
October 11	Portland		Bell Field; Corvallis, OR	W 26–0	6,000	
October 19	at No. 16 Washington	No. 18	Husky Stadium; Seattle, WA	L 0–19	36,000	
October 26	at UCLA		Los Angeles Coliseum; Los Angeles, CA	W 7–0	25,000	
November 2	at California		California Memorial Stadium; Berkeley, CA	W 19–13	20,000	
November 9	Washington State		Bell Field; Corvallis, OR	W 21–0	8,000	
November 16	at No. 4 Stanford	No. 19	Stanford Stadium; Stanford, CA	L 14–28	35,000	
November 30	Oregon		Bell Field; Corvallis, OR (rivalry)	L 0–20	18,000	
Rankings from AP Poll released prior to the game

== Rankings ==
Ranking movements Legend: ██ Increase in ranking ██ Decrease in ranking — = Not ranked
	Week							
Poll	1	2	3	4	5	6	7	Final
AP	18	—	—	—	19	—	—	—

== Background ==
The 1940 college football season marked the 46th year of competition for Oregon State College (OSC) — formerly known as Oregon Agricultural College (OAC) and known today as Oregon State University (OSU). The season was the eighth led by head coach Lon Stiner (1903–1985). It was also the final year of limited substitution in the NCAA, under which a player removed from the game for a replacement was lost to his team for the duration of the quarter by rule.

OSC star left tackle Vic Sears, who in a 12-year career with the Philadelphia Eagles would become a two-time NFL champion and member of the NFL's All-1940s team.

The Beavers were coming off a highly successful 1939 season, crowned by a resounding 39–6 victory over the University of Hawaii in the Pineapple Bowl on New Years Day, with the team making its triumphant return to the port of San Francisco aboard ship on January 12, 1940. The 1940 team was heavily hit by graduations, however, with the leather helmets of two ends, three tackles, and two guards giving way to the mortarboard in June.

Head coach Stiner announced a full slate of 30 spring practices, as permitted under Pacific Coast Conference rules, in preparation for the fall 1940 campaign. The six weeks of spring practices were to be culminated with a full intersquad game, Stirner announced.

Preparation for the 1940 season began in earnest on September 12, with just 39 players showing up for two-a-day practices in an attempt to make the team. In addition to having to face a small number of participants, Stiner expressed misgivings about having too many "green" players to justify the top ranking ventured by some preseason analysts, but hoped that with further development the team would eventually merit such consideration.

A preseason pundit writing for Illustrated Football Annual touted two Beaver seniors as potential stars who were "ripe for recognition from All-America pickers." These were tackle Vic Sears, who "dishes out a terrific exhibition of football every time he goes into action," and fullback Jim Kisselburgh, reckoned as "one of the best all-around backfield men of the (Pacific Coast Conference) circuit." Both of these players would later be selected in the 1941 draft by teams of the National Football League (NFL).

== Game summaries ==
=== Idaho ===
Oregon State began the 1940 season in style with a resounding 41–0 shutout victory over the Idaho Vandals at Bell Field in Corvallis. The Beaver victory was the most lopsided in 27 years of gridiron competition between the schools.

Program for the season opener against the Idaho Vandals, held in Corvallis at Bell Field.

A crowd of 6,500 watched OSC score twice in the first quarter — once on a 56-yard scoring drive and again two minutes later on a 76-yard fake punt. The Beavers made effective use of a 6-2-2-1 base defense, adjusting to a five-man front in passing situations, in holding the visitors to a net of -7 yards in total offense. Senior fullback Jim Kisselburgh led OSC with 105 yards on the ground, while the Beavers went 4-for-6 passing for 33 yards and a touchdown. "The Vandals, using sophomores in key positions, weren't in the same class as Oregon State," one observer noted, adding that Idaho "played poor fundamental football and made repeated mistakes."

=== USC ===
Thirty-seven year old Lon Stiner — still the youngest head coach in the Pacific Coast Conference — led his outnumbered squad to the lion's den on October 5, to do battle with the USC Trojans at the Los Angeles Memorial Coliseum. While the contest was not the stuff of legend, as was the 1933 OSC–USC contest in which eleven Beaver "iron men" each played a full 60 minutes in battling the Trojans to a scoreless stalemate, the end result was the same — another zero-zero tie. Southern Cal outgained the visiting Orangemen 298 yards to 236 on the day, but OSC nevertheless managed to provide several "anxious moments" for the 40,000 assembled fans. As the first half was coming to a close, reserve quarterback Bob Olson flipped a pass to Gene Gray for an apparent touchdown — only to have the play nullified by an offensive off-sides call.

The Beavers also coughed up the ball twice to the Trojans on interceptions inside the USC red zone, once at the 13-yard line and once at the 5. With 90 seconds remaining in the fourth quarter, with attrition from substitutions and injuries making itself felt, OSC's Olson was intercepted near midfield. Fourth-string USC quarterback Ray Woods marched the Trojans into position for a game-winning 27-yard chip-shot field goal with seven seconds on the clock — but the kick sailed wide, leaving another 0–0 tie in the books. This marked the fourth time in eight games under Coach Stiner that OSC and USC had battled to a deadlock.

=== Portland ===
OSC fullback Jim Kisselburgh was a third-team All-American in 1940.

The Beavers made it three consecutive shutouts to start the 1940 season with a 26–0 drubbing of the University of Portland Pilots on a clear Friday night in front of 6,000 fans at Bell Field in Corvallis. It was the first night football game played in Corvallis in several years. The home team scored their first points just 2:35 into the first quarter on a fumble recovery, adding a second touchdown before halftime on a 25-yard run by reserve halfback Joe Day.

The game was blown open in the fourth quarter with two interception returned for touchdowns, with reserve linebacker Bob Rambo and reserve defensive halfback Frank Chase scoring for the Orangemen on pick-6 returns of 25 and 35 yards, respectively. The game was a sloppy affair, with Oregon State fumbling a mind-boggling ten times, recovering their own drops all but twice. But the Beaver defense was once again wilting, with the visiting Pilots held to just 7 yards gained from scrimmage on the night.

Oregon State substituted with full line-ups, with the starters playing the first and third quarters and a "second deck" of reserves handling matters in the second and fourth periods of play.

=== Washington ===
Cover of the program for the Week 4 matchup between the OSC Beavers and Washington Huskies.

With two wins over lesser opponents and a tie with USC under their belts, the Orangemen headed north to take on the University of Washington Huskies, headed by 11-year veteran coach Jim Phelan. The Beavers arrived hoping to continue a three game winning streak against their opponents from Seattle, highlighted by their 1939 performance, when a squad of just 19 players managed to tame the Huskies, 13–7. This was not to be OSC's year, however, as the team's Rose Bowl dreams would come crashing down in a 19–0 shellacking in a heavy rain.

Fumble-itis returned for OSC, who put the ball on the ground for turnovers four times. With the game scoreless at halftime — making 14 consecutive quarters for the Beavers' defense. Washington came out in the third period highly motivated and ready to play. The "Statue of Liberty" play — already regarded as a hoary relic in 1940 — was dusted off and used with great effect, with halfback Ernie Steele picking up a 23-yard chunk to take the ball to the OSC 17. Three plays later Steele broke an 11-yard run to paydirt through the middle of the OSC line, and the Beavers' scoreless defensive streak was at an end. A mishandled punt snap by Jim Kisselburgh accentuated by a personal foul set up Washington at the one-yard line for an easy touchdown plunge by halfback Dean McAdams.

Desperation passes by the Beavers got the ball to the Washington 31 with a minute remaining — their deepest penetration of the contest — but a Bob Dethman pass was picked off, ending all hope for the visitors. On the final play of the game Washington substitute halfback Gene Walters broke free around end and danced 61-yards to cap the scoring.

=== UCLA ===
Junior left end John Leovich was OSC's most effective pass receiver of the 1940 season.

With the season record sitting at 2–1–1, Oregon State again made the long trip to Southern California to face the UCLA Bruins at Memorial Coliseum in Los Angeles. The Beavers managed to add to winless UCLA's woes with a 7–0 victory in front of a sparse crowd of 25,000 in the massive sports stadium. The game's sole score came with a 57-yard scoring drive in the second quarter, capped by a 31-yard scoring pass from left halfback Bob Dethman to left end John Leovich. On the play, Leovich grabbed the pass on the 15 and fought his way to paydirt. The play was just one of two OSC completions on the day out of ten attempts. The Beavers outgained the Bruins, 225 yards to 194, and could have extended their lead if they had managed to convert second half field goals attempts of 20 and 30 yards. Kicker Len Younce missed one kick low and the other wide.

Oregon State's "huge line," led by Younce, star tackle Vic Sears, and guard Bill Halverson, "smothered the UCLA backs most of the afternoon," in the words of one local sports reporter. UCLA's star halfback, Jackie Robinson, did manage to break two good runs, however, for 20 and 12 yards respectively — the Bruins' longest-gaining plays of the day. Robinson also connected on a couple throws to sophomore end Milt Smith, later giving up a big interception in his own end of the field.

The game marked the fourth time in five outings that the rugged OSC defense had pitched a shutout.

=== California ===
Cover of the program for the Week 6 matchup between the Beavers and the Cal Golden Bears.

For the first five weeks of the season, Lon Stiner's Orangemen had either shut out their opponents or been shut out, or both. Finally, in the sixth week of a nine week season, Oregon State played a game in which both teams scored points — with the favored Beavers coming out on top.

In the words of an Associated Press staff reporter, visiting Oregon State made use of a "stunning ground attack with a surprisingly effective aerial game" in playing ahead of the Golden Bears all day. The Beavers scored just 3:40 into the game, capitalizing on a fumble on his own 26-yard line by Jack McQuary, Cal fullback. Four runs and a lateral brought the ball to the 6, with left halfback Bob Dethman capping the drive with a touchdown pass to right half Gene Gray.

Cal answered with a touchdown drive from their own 33 to tie the score later in the first period, narrowly missing a chance to take the lead when a 40-yard field goal attempt went wide. With only 2:30 until halftime, OSC again took the lead with a touchdown scoring drive, marked by a 43-yard run by reserve fullback Ken Dow and two completed passes from reserve left halfback Bob Olson. The point-after was missed and OSC went to the locker room holding a 13–7 lead.

In the third quarter, disaster struck the Beavers when starting fullback Jim Kisselburgh fumbled, leading to a rumbling, stumbling, fumbling 54-yard return for a touchdown by the tag-team of Bears Stuart Lewis and Carlton Hoberg for the equalizer. Near the start of the fourth quarter, OSC began its game-winning seven-play drive, crowned by a 24-yard touchdown pass from left halfback Dethman to right half Don Durdan. The Beavers moved to a mark of 4–1–1 with the 19–13 win.

=== Washington State ===
Bob Dethman was Oregon State's best passer, playing left halfback in Lon Stiner's single-wing offense.

The Beavers returned to the Bell Field for their November 9 match up with the Washington State College Cougars. The Cougars, 3–1–2 on the season, were coming off a 26–0 shellacking of Idaho on the road.

8,000 fans packed the stands to watch the land-grant colleges of Washington and Oregon slug out a scoreless first quarter. Then, with just over six minutes remaining before half, Stiner's "second deck" reserve squad started a 73-yard drive that broke the stalemate, highlighted by a one-yard plunge by halfback Bob Dethman.

Unable to make headway on the ground against the stout Beaver line, the Cougars passed the ball with abandon, putting it in the air 36 times. OSC was able to knock down or intercept enough of these aerial efforts to keep the visitors at bay until in the third quarter Washington State managed to take the ball to the OSC 8-yard line, first-and-goal, with a potential tie score in the offing. The Beaver defense managed to hold, keeping the score 7–0 into the fourth quarter.

Late in the final period it was Dethman again coming up big twice — first breaking a run for 37 yards to set up a two-yard run for a second score with just 1:55 remaining and then snatching a Cougar pass from his defensive halfback position and returning it 39 yards. A short pass from Dethman to Norm Peters capped the scoring with just 17 seconds showing on the game clock. OSC's last second touchdown made the 21–0 score the worst loss suffered by Washington State to the Orangemen since a 29–0 thrashing by Oregon Agricultural College way back in 1905, the second year of the series.

=== Stanford ===
Cover of the program for the November 16 OSC game at Stanford. No overprinting was used on the stock cover image.

OSC was riding high with a 5–1–1 record and cracking the national Top 20 rankings as they traveled to Palo Alto, California, to take on their toughest challenge of the season — the undefeated No. 4 ranked Stanford Indians. The Indians had the initial incentive of being in position to clinch a Rose Bowl berth as Pacific Coast Conference champions with a victory over OSC. They would not falter.

Stanford took an early 7–0 lead, driving 71 yards to paydirt on the opening drive of the game, with fullback Milton Vucinich ultimately gaining scoring honors wit a one-yard plunge. The Beavers came back to tie the game late in the first quarter, with lefty passing halfback Don Durdan hitting quarterback George Peters on a 30-yard touchdown bomb.

In an effort to stop future NFL star quarterback Frankie Albert of Stanford, who had mowed down opponents using first-year head coach Clark Shaughnessy's man-in-motion T-formation borrowed from the Chicago Bears, OSC made use of a defensive innovation — reckoned by sportswriter Art Cohn of the Oakland Tribune as the "craziest defense in years" and "designed expressly to stop Stanford's vaunted sky attack." The crafty Lon Stiner "put only four men on the line of scrimmage" and "deployed three others two yards behind them" — that is to say, a modern, double safety 4–3–4 defense in an era when the overwhelming norm was 6–2–2–1.

The 7–7 game turned early in the second half, when the Beavers surrendered touchdowns on a 38-yard run, a 38-yard Frankie Albert pass, and an 18-yard run up the gut — 21 points in just nine minutes of game time. OSU's four-man defensive front "might have been an effective anti-aircraft weapon" but proved a "balmy" target for Stanford's ground attack, Cohn noted. Not to be outcoached, Shaughnessy ran the damned ball all day, eviscerating OSC for 311 yards on the ground and attempting only four throws during the entire game. OSC scored again on a fourth quarter pass from Dethman to Leovich, but it was too little, too late, with Stanford gaining its Rose Bowl berth in a resounding 28–14 victory.

=== Oregon ===
With five wins, two losses, and one tie, only the annual battle with the Oregon Ducks remained — the final game of the season reserved as a competition for in-state bragging rights. The Ducks had started the season poorly, including three consecutive shutouts to begin Coast Conference competition, but had lately turned things around, pitching two shutouts of their own before dropping a road game to Cal by eight points. Nevertheless, the Orangemen were regarded as big favorites coming into the game, held at the friendly confines of little Bell Field.

The Webfoots wasted no time making the home crowd uncomfortable, when Oregon's Leonard Isberg returned a kick to the Beavers' 31 yard line, setting up the first of the team's three touchdowns. Fullback Isberg and halfback Buck Berry alternated runs, driving the ball to the 2-yard line, with Isberg doing the honors just 5:30 into the game. The try for extra point was wide, forcing the Ducks to settle with a 6–0 lead.

Oregon State got within sniffing distance of the goal line twice in the first quarter, with drives that stalled at the Oregon 10 and 9, respectively. Oregon's defensive line was later credited for its "best game of the year" in newspaper coverage.

Oregon launched its second scoring drive in the second quarter, with Isberg breaking off a 33 yard run to take the ball to the OSC 22. It appeared that it was the Beavers' turn to hold the line, but a gamble to "go for it" 4th-and-goal from the 10-yard line paid off richly, with Isberg scoring his second rushing touchdown of the day.

The teams traded possessions throughout the third quarter, with the Ducks capping the scoring in the fourth with a 37-yard touchdown run by halfback Curt Mecham. The Ducks were 0-for-3 passing on the day but their lopsided 228 to 115 yard rushing advantage proved more than sufficient to hand Stiner's team a bitter loss for a final record of 5 wins, 3 losses, and 1 tie.

== Season highlights ==
The 1940 Oregon State Beavers were regarded as a well-coached and well-disciplined team, judged by the American Football Statistical Bureau as one of the "cleanest" in the country — along with Princeton and BYU — for averaging fewer than 18 yards per game in penalties.

Four seniors who played on the 1940 Beaver team were drafted in the 1941 NFL draft with an additional three juniors on the 1940 team drafted into the NFL the following year. There were also four sophomores on the 1940 team who were selected in the 1942 NFL draft — making a total of 11 players from the 39-man squad given the opportunity to play professional football.

Two members of the 1940 Oregon State team had lengthy careers as starters in the NFL — guard and linebacker Len Younce, who played six years with the New York Giants, and offensive and defensive tackle Vic Sears, who played twelve years with the Philadelphia Eagles. Both of these players' careers were interrupted by World War II but were able to play in the league both before and after the conflict.

Despite being drafted by the NFL after graduation, fullback and linebacker Jim Kisselburgh was issued a low military draft number and joined the Army Air Corps in January 1941 rather than be forced to accept placement in another branch of the service. He served during the war as a member of a bomber crew and was shot down on his 35th mission over Germany. He was captured and interned in a prisoner-of-war camp at Moosburg, Germany, located 30 miles northeast of Munich. He was safely liberated after Germany's surrender.

The 1940 Oregon State squad finished the season ranked at No. 36 (out of 697 college football teams) under the Litkenhous Difference by Score system for 1940 and at No. 51 according to the Azziratem System favored by Illustrated Football Annual magazine.

== Roster ==
Quarterbacks
• 12 - Joe Tomich (Senior)
• 35 - Tom Sommerville (Senior)
• 58 - George Peters (Junior) * †

Halfbacks
• 25 - Gene Gray (Junior) *
• 26 - Bob Dethman (Junior) †
• 28 - Frank Chase (Junior)
• 39 - Don Durdan (Junior)
• 52 - Joe Day (Sophomore) †
• 62 - Bob Horn (Junior)
• 82 - Bob Olson (Senior) *

Fullbacks
• 43 - Jim Busch (Junior)
• 45 - Kenny Dow (Senior) †
• 49 - Jim Kisselburgh (Senior) * †

Ends
• 29 - Ken Pruitt (Sophomore)
• 32 - Lew Hammers (Junior)
• 36 - Norm Peters (Junior) *
• 42 - John Leovich (Junior) *
• 56 - Warren Perryman (Sophomore)
• 64 - George Zellick (Sophomore) †
• 89 - Leeds Bailey (Senior)

Tackles
• 59 - Glenn Byington (Junior)
• 65 - Stan Czech (Junior) *
• 68 - Lloyd Wickett (Sophomore) †
• 84 - Vic Sears (Senior) * †
• 92 - Bob Saunders (Sophomore)
• 93 - Orv Zielaskowski (Sophomore)
• 96 - George Bain (Sophomore) †

Guards
• 34 - Bob Cole (Sophomore)
• 46 - Norm Newman (Sophomore)
• 48 - Bob Rambo (Sophomore)
• 53 - Len Younce (Senior) * †
• 54 - John Conrad (Sophomore)
• 63 - Bill Halverson (Junior) * †
• 85 - Marvin Markman (Sophomore)
• 98 - Martin Chaves (Sophomore)

Centers
• 38 - Tom Gilbert (Sophomore)
• 69 - Frank Parker (Sophomore)
• 86 - Bud English (Junior) *
• 95 - Quenton Greenough (Junior)

Kickers
• Younce, Leovich, Bain.
Punter
• Kisselburgh.

Projected opening day starters marked with *
Eventual NFL draft pick marked with †

== Seniors drafted into the NFL ==
Player	Position	Round	Pick	NFL club
Vic Sears	Tackle	5	33	Pittsburgh Steelers
Jim Kisselburgh	Back	6	44	Cleveland Rams
Len Younce	Guard	8	67	New York Giants
Ken Dow	Fullback	16	150	Washington Redskins
