= Ray Newman =

Ray Newman or Raymond Newman may refer to:

- Ray Newman (American football) (1922–2017), American football coach and scout
- Ray Newman (baseball) (born 1945), American former Major League Baseball pitcher
- Ray Newman (politician), American politician, member of the New Hampshire House of Representatives
