= 1940 Idaho Vandals football team =

American college football season

1940 Idaho Vandals football
- Conference: Pacific Coast Conference
- Record: 1–7–1 (0–4 PCC)
- Head coach: Ted Bank (6th season)
- Home stadium: Neale Stadium

1940 Pacific Coast Conference football standings
	Conf.					Overall
Team	W		L		T	W		L		T
No. 2 Stanford $	7	–	0	–	0	10	–	0	–	0
No. 10 Washington	7	–	1	–	0	7	–	2	–	0
Oregon State	4	–	3	–	1	5	–	3	–	1
Washington State	3	–	4	–	2	4	–	4	–	2
Oregon	3	–	4	–	1	4	–	4	–	1
California	3	–	4	–	0	4	–	6	–	0
USC	2	–	3	–	2	3	–	4	–	2
Montana	1	–	2	–	0	4	–	4	–	1
UCLA	1	–	6	–	0	1	–	9	–	0
Idaho	0	–	4	–	0	1	–	7	–	1
$ – Conference champion; Rankings from AP Poll

The 1940 Idaho Vandals football team represented the University of Idaho in the 1940 college football season. The Vandals were led by sixth-year head coach Ted Bank, and were members of the Pacific Coast Conference.

Idaho was ranked at No. 186 (out of 697 college football teams) in the final rankings under the Litkenhous Difference by Score system for 1940.

Home games were played on campus in Moscow at Neale Stadium, with one game in Boise at Public School Field.

The Vandals were 1–7–1 overall and lost all four conference games. They did not play any of the four teams from California or the Oregon Webfoots. In the Battle of the Palouse with neighbor Washington State, the Vandals suffered a thirteenth straight loss, falling 26–0 at homecoming in Moscow on November 2. Idaho's most recent win in the series was a fifteen years earlier in 1925 and the next was fourteen years away in 1954.

A week later, Idaho continued its rare three-year losing streak to Montana in the Little Brown Stein rivalry with a ten-point loss at Missoula. It improved the Grizzlies' record against the Vandals to 7–19–1 (.278). While Montana was in the PCC (through 1949), the loser of the game was frequently last in the conference standings. This was the seventh game of the season, and the first in which Idaho scored.

Bank was relieved of his coaching duties in January 1941, succeeded by Francis Schmidt of Ohio State.

== Schedule ==
Program for the season opener against the Oregon State Beavers, held in Corvallis at Bell Field

Date	Time	Opponent	Site	Result	Attendance	Source
September 28	2:00 pm	at Oregon State	Bell Field; Corvallis, OR	L 0–41	6,500–7,000	
October 5	2:00 pm	at Washington	Husky Stadium; Seattle, WA	L 0–21	23,000	
October 12	2:00 pm	Gonzaga*	Neale Stadium; Moscow, ID (rivalry)	L 0–25		
October 19	11:00 am	at Boston College*	Fenway Park; Boston, MA	L 0–60	10,000	
October 26	1:00 pm	vs. Utah State*	Public School Field; Boise, ID	T 0–0	3,500	
November 2	2:00 pm	Washington State^{†}	Neale Stadium; Moscow, ID (Battle of the Palouse)	L 0–26		
November 9	1:00 pm	at Montana	Dornblaser Field; Missoula, MT (Little Brown Stein)	L 18–28	7,000	
November 16	2:00 pm	Nevada*	Neale Stadium; Moscow, ID	W 6–0	2,500	
November 21	12:30 pm	at Utah*	Ute Stadium; Salt Lake City, UT	L 6–13	4,113	
*Non-conference game; ^{†}Homecoming; All times are in Pacific time

== Coaching staff ==
- Bob Tessier, line
- Forrest Twogood
- Walt Price, freshmen

== All-conference ==
No Vandals were named to the All-Coast team; honorable mention were end Chace Anderson, tackle Glenn Rathbun, and guard Len Zenkevitch.
