= 1940 All-Pacific Coast football team =

American all-star college football team

The 1940 All-Pacific Coast football team consists of American football players chosen by various organizations for All-Pacific Coast teams for the 1940 college football season. The organizations selecting teams in 1940 included the Associated Press (AP) and the United Press (UP).

The 1941 Stanford Indians football team compiled an undefeated 10-0 record, were ranked #2 in the final AP Poll, and had six players receiving first-team honors: quarterback Frankie Albert (AP, UP), halfback Pete Kmetovic (AP), fullback Norm Standlee (AP, UP), end Fred Meyer (AP), and tackles Bob Reinhard and Bruno Banducci (UP).

The 1941 Washington Huskies football team finished in second place with a 5-4 record and was represented by four players on either the AP or UP first team: halfback Dean McAdams (AP, UP), end Jay MacDowell (AP, UP), guard Ray Frankowski (AP, UP), and center Rudy Mucha (AP, UP).

No players from teams outside the PCC received first-team honors from the AP or UP.

== All-Pacific Coast selections ==
=== Quarterback ===
- Frankie Albert, Stanford (AP-1; UP-1)
- Bobby Robertson, USC (AP-3; UP-2)
- George Peters, Oregon State (AP-2)
- Don Means, Washington (AP-3)

=== Halfbacks ===
- Dean McAdams, Washington (AP-1; UP-1)
- Pete Kmetovic, Stanford (AP-1; UP-2)
- Bill Sewell, Washington State (AP-2; UP-1)
- Hugh Gallarneau, Stanford (AP-2)
- Jackie Robinson, UCLA (UP-2)
- Orv Hatcher, California (AP-3)

=== Fullback ===
- Norm Standlee, Stanford (AP-1; UP-1)
- Jim Kisselburgh, Oregon State (AP-2; UP-2)
- Jack Stackpool, Washington (AP-3)

=== Ends ===
- Jay MacDowell, Washington (AP-1; UP-1)
- Fred Meyer, Stanford (AP-1; UP-2)
- Milt Smith, UCLA (AP-2; UP-1)
- Al Krueger, USC (AP-2; UP-2)
- John Leovich, Oregon State (AP-3)
- John Ruskusky, Saint Mary's (AP-3)

=== Tackles ===
- Bob Reinhard, Stanford (AP-1; UP-1)
- Vic Sears, Oregon State (AP-1; UP-2)
- Bruno Banducci, Stanford (AP-2; UP-1)
- Jim Stuart, Oregon (AP-2; UP-2)
- Glen Conley, Washington (AP-3)
- Stan Johnson, Washington State (AP-3)

=== Guards ===
- Ray Frankowski, Washington (AP-1; UP-1)
- Len Younce, Oregon State (AP-1; UP-1)
- Chuck Taylor, Stanford (AP-2; UP-2)
- Rupe Thornton, Santa Clara (AP-2)
- Ben Sohn, USC (UP-2)
- Dick Palmer, Stanford (AP-3)
- Charles Donohue, California (AP-3)

=== Centers ===
- Rudy Mucha, Washington (AP-1; UP-1)
- Vic Lindskog, Stanford (AP-2; UP-2)
- Ed Dempsey, USC (AP-3)

== Key ==
AP = Associated Press, selected based on "annual consensus poll of sports writers, officials and coaches"

UP = United Press: "Sports editors of the United Press client newspapers of the Pacific Coast made the selections ..."

Bold = Consensus first-team selection of both the AP and UP

== See also ==
- 1940 College Football All-America Team
