= Jay MacDowell =

American football player (1919–1992)

No. 85, 88
- Positions: Tackle, Defensive end

Personal information
- Born: September 14, 1919; Oak Park, Illinois, U.S.
- Died: June 15, 1992 (aged 72); Springfield Township, Delaware County, Pennsylvania, U.S.
- Listed height: 6 ft 2 in (1.88 m)
- Listed weight: 217 lb (98 kg)

Career information
- High school: Oak Park and River Forest
- College: Washington (1937-1940)
- NFL draft: 1941: 3rd round, 19th overall pick

Career history
- Philadelphia Eagles (1946–1951)

Awards and highlights
- 2× NFL champion (1948, 1949); First-team All-American (1940); 3× First-team All-PCC (1938, 1939, 1940)

Career NFL statistics
- Games played: 62
- Games started: 38
- Fumble recoveries: 6
- Stats at Pro Football Reference

Jay Sidney MacDowell (September 14, 1919 – June 15, 1992) was an American professional football player who played tackle and end for six seasons for the Philadelphia Eagles. He was selected by the Cleveland Rams in the first round of the 1941 NFL draft.

After graduating from college, he entered the Army Air Corps as a first lieutenant and was at Pearl Harbor when the Japanese attacked Dec. 7, 1941.

After the war, he did postgraduate work at Michigan State University for a year before going to play for the Philadelphia Eagles.
