= 1940 Montana Grizzlies football team =

American college football season

1940 Montana Grizzlies football
- Conference: Pacific Coast Conference
- Record: 4–4–1 (1–2 PCC)
- Head coach: Doug Fessenden (6th season)
- Home stadium: Dornblaser Field

1940 Pacific Coast Conference football standings
| | Conf. | | | | | Overall |
| Team | W | | L | | T | W | | L | | T |
|---|---|---|---|---|---|---|---|---|---|---|
| No. 2 Stanford $ | 7 | – | 0 | – | 0 | 10 | – | 0 | – | 0 |
| No. 10 Washington | 7 | – | 1 | – | 0 | 7 | – | 2 | – | 0 |
| Oregon State | 4 | – | 3 | – | 1 | 5 | – | 3 | – | 1 |
| Washington State | 3 | – | 4 | – | 2 | 4 | – | 4 | – | 2 |
| Oregon | 3 | – | 4 | – | 1 | 4 | – | 4 | – | 1 |
| California | 3 | – | 4 | – | 0 | 4 | – | 6 | – | 0 |
| USC | 2 | – | 3 | – | 2 | 3 | – | 4 | – | 2 |
| Montana | 1 | – | 2 | – | 0 | 4 | – | 4 | – | 1 |
| UCLA | 1 | – | 6 | – | 0 | 1 | – | 9 | – | 0 |
| Idaho | 0 | – | 4 | – | 0 | 1 | – | 7 | – | 1 |
$ – Conference champion; Rankings from AP Poll

The 1940 Montana Grizzlies football team represented the University of Montana in the 1940 college football season as a member of the Pacific Coast Conference (PCC). The Grizzlies were led by sixth-year head coach Doug Fessenden, played their home games at Dornblaser Field and finished the season with a record of four wins, four losses and one tie (4–4–1, 1–2 PCC).

Montana was ranked at No. 169 (out of 697 college football teams) in the final rankings under the Litkenhous Difference by Score system for 1940.

== Schedule ==
| Date | Time | Opponent | Site | Result | Attendance | Source |
|---|---|---|---|---|---|---|
| September 28 | 8:00 p.m. | Eastern Washington* | Dornblaser Field; Missoula, MT (rivalry) | W 9–0 | | |
| October 5 | | at Washington State | Rogers Field; Pullman, WA | L 0–13 | 7,500 | |
| October 12 | | Texas Tech* | Dornblaser Field; Missoula, MT | L 19–32 | | |
| October 19 | | vs. Montana State* | Butte High Stadium; Butte, MT (rivalry) | W 6–0 | 6,000 | |
| October 26 | | vs. Gonzaga* | Butte High Stadium; Butte, MT | W 13–10 | 4,000 | |
| November 2 | | at Oregon | Hayward Field; Eugene OR | L 0–38 | 4,500 | |
| November 9 | | Idaho | Dornblaser Field; Missoula, MT (rivalry) | W 28–18 | 7,000 | |
| November 15 | | at San Diego Marines* | City Stadium; San Diego, CA | L 20–38 | | |
| November 23 | | at Portland* | Multnomah Stadium; Portland, OR | T 0–0 | 2,500 | |
*Non-conference game; All times are in Mountain time; Source:
