= Ben Sohn =

American football player (1918–1999)

No. 44, 24
- Positions: Guard, Tackle

Personal information
- Born: September 16, 1918; San Diego, California, U.S.
- Died: July 15, 1999 (aged 80); San Diego, California, U.S.
- Listed height: 6 ft 3 in (1.91 m)
- Listed weight: 230 lb (104 kg)

Career information
- High school: San Diego
- College: USC (1937–1940)
- NFL draft: 1941: 9th round, 76th overall pick

Career history

Playing
- New York Giants (1941); San Diego Bombers (1946)

Coaching
- San Diego Bombers (1946) Assistant Coach

Awards and highlights
- National champion (1939); Second-team All-PCC (1940)

Career NFL statistics
- Games played: 12
- Games started: 3
- Stats at Pro Football Reference

Benjamin Forester Sohn (September 16, 1918 – July 15, 1999) was an American professional football guard and tackle for the New York Giants of the National Football League (NFL). He played college football for the USC Trojans. Sohn also played for the San Diego Bombers of the Pacific Coast Professional Football League (PCPFL).

== Early life ==
Sohn was born on September 16, 1918, in San Diego, California. He attended San Diego High School where he played at tackle.

== College career ==
Sohn played college football for the USC Trojans from 1937 to 1940 and was a three-year letterman from 1938 to 1940. As a sophomore, he was moved to guard. On December 9, 1939, Sohn's father, Frank A. Sohn, died of a heart attack on his way to the game against the UCLA Bruins. He was not told until after the game by his mother. In 1965, Sohn was honored by USC as the "lineman of the game" for his performance. He was a member of the Trojans 1939 national championship team and earned second-team All-Pacific Coast Conference honors in 1940. In 1941, Sohn played in the East–West Shrine Game and College All-Star Game.

== Professional career ==
=== New York Giants ===
Sohn was selected by the New York Giants in the ninth round, with the 76th overall pick, of the 1941 NFL draft. On September 10, 1941, it was announced that he would fill in for the injured Ed Widseth at tackle. Sohn played in all 11 regular season games and had three starts. He also played in the 1941 NFL Championship Game.

=== San Diego Bombers ===
On August 10, 1946, Sohn was signed by the San Diego Bombers of the Pacific Coast Professional Football League (PCPFL) as a player-coach.

== Personal life ==
After playing one season for the Giants, Sohn ran a public accounting office in San Diego. He later served in the United States Marine Corps during World War II. Sohn was an instructor at the marine's officer school in Quantico, Virginia and was later stationed at Camp Pendleton. He reached the rank of Captain and was wounded during the Battle of Iwo Jima. Sohn died on July 15, 1999 in San Diego.
