= Hugh Gallarneau =

American football player (1917–1999)

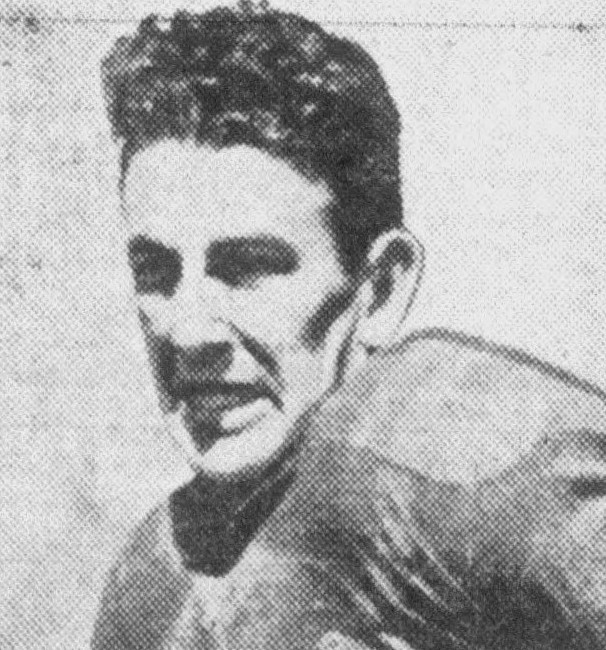
- Gallarneau in 1942

No. 8
- Position: Halfback

Personal information
- Born: April 2, 1917; Detroit, Michigan, U.S.
- Died: July 14, 1999 (aged 82); Northbrook, Illinois, U.S.
- Listed height: 6 ft 0 in (1.83 m)
- Listed weight: 190 lb (86 kg)

Career information
- High school: Morgan Park (Chicago, Illinois)
- College: Stanford (1937-1940)
- NFL draft: 1941: 3rd round, 23rd overall pick

Career history
- Chicago Bears (1941–1942, 1945–1947)

Awards and highlights
- 2× NFL champion (1941, 1946); Second-team All-Pro (1946); Pro Bowl (1941); NFL rushing touchdowns leader (1941); First-team All-American (1940); Second-team All-PCC (1940)

Career NFL statistics
- Rushing yards: 1,421
- Rushing average: 4.1
- Receptions: 51
- Receiving yards: 794
- Total touchdowns: 35
- Stats at Pro Football Reference
- College Football Hall of Fame

Hugh Harold "Duke" Gallarneau (April 2, 1917 – July 14, 1999) was an American professional player who was a halfback in the National Football League (NFL) from 1941 to 1942 and 1945 to 1947 for the Chicago Bears. He played college football at Stanford, where he was an All-American.

== College career ==
Gallarneau attended Morgan Park High School in Chicago, Illinois, but did not play high school football, opting instead for swimming, track, and baseball. After high school, he was accepted to Stanford University on an academic scholarship, and decided to try out for the football team for the 1938 season and made the team.

In 1938, Stanford's team was 3–6, and the next year, fell to 1–7–1. The next year, 1940, new head football coach Clark Shaughnessy introduced the T formation, and the Indians were transformed in a winner. Gallarneau, as part of a backfield including future NFL players quarterback Frankie Albert, halfback Pete Kmetovic, and fullback Norm Standlee, were the core of a team known as the Wow Boys, which went undefeated and beat Nebraska 21–13 in the 1941 Rose Bowl. In that game, Gallarneau scored two of Stanford's touchdowns, on a 10-yard run and a 40-yard pass reception.

Gallarneau was named an All-American in football, was on Stanford's rugby team, and won the Pacific Coast Conference heavyweight boxing title.

== NFL career ==
In the 1941 NFL draft, Gallarneau was selected in the third round by the Chicago Bears. He played for the Bears for the 1941 and 1942 seasons. Gallarneau still holds the Bears' record for the longest punt return in a postseason game, returning a punt 81 yards for a touchdown against the Green Bay Packers in the divisional playoffs to help lead the Bears to the 1941 NFL Championship game. The return also remains the third-longest in NFL postseason history.

== World War II ==
In 1943, Gallarneau joined the Marine Corps to fight in World War II. He was trained as a night fighter director and fought in the Pacific Theater, rising to the rank of major. During the Battle of Okinawa and he was a member of Air Warning Squadron 8 attached to a SCR-527 radar detachment located near Yontan Airifeld. On May 18, Gallarneau was working with 1stLt Robert Wellwood from VMF(N)-533, callsign "Scrapper 17." That evening Gallarneau and Wellwood collaborated to shoot down three Japanese Mitsubishi G4M "Betty" bombers. Gallarneau was awarded the Bronze Star for his efforts in assisting with the downing of six Japanese aircraft during the Battle of Okinawa. He returned to the Bears for the 1945 season, and played three more seasons before retiring in 1947.

== NFL career statistics ==
Legend
	Won the NFL Championship
	Led the league
**Bold**	Career high

=== Regular season ===
Year	Team	Games		Rushing					Receiving				
Year	Team	GP	GS	Att	Yds	Avg	Lng	TD	Rec	Yds	Avg	Lng	TD
1941	CHI	11	8	49	304	**6.2**	40	**8**	11	204	18.5	46	2
1942	CHI	10	9	68	292	4.3	20	4	**14**	**291**	**20.8**	**60**	**3**
1945	CHI	8	7	75	260	3.5	31	2	7	58	8.3	36	1
1946	CHI	11	5	**112**	**476**	4.3	**52**	6	12	185	15.4	36	1
1947	CHI	12	4	39	89	2.3	8	6	7	56	8.0	28	0
		52	33	343	1,421	4.1	52	26	51	794	15.6	60	7

=== Playoffs ===
Year	Team	Games		Rushing					Receiving				
Year	Team	GP	GS	Att	Yds	Avg	Lng	TD	Rec	Yds	Avg	Lng	TD
1941	CHI	2	2	**10**	17	1.7	-	0	0	0	0.0	0	0
1942	CHI	1	1	2	9	**4.5**	**9**	0	**1**	-9	-9.0	-9	0
1946	CHI	1	1	6	**24**	4.0	-	0	0	0	0.0	0	0
		4	4	18	50	2.8	9	0	1	-9	-9.0	-9	0

== After football ==
After leaving football, Gallarneau remained in Chicago, working for Marshall Field's and Hart, Schaffner & Marx, where he retired as a vice president in 1985. He was inducted into the College Football Hall of Fame in 1982 and is a member of the Stanford Athletic Hall of Fame and the Chicagoland Sports Hall of Fame. He died in Northfield, Illinois, in 1999.

== Bibliography ==
- DeChant, John A. (1947). Devilbirds – The Story of United States Marine Aviation in World War II. New York: Harper & Brothers.
