= Ray Frankowski =

American football player (1919–2001)

- Frankowski in 1940

No. 15, 37, 34
- Position: Guard

Personal information
- Born: September 14, 1919; Chicago, Illinois, U.S.
- Died: November 27, 2001 (aged 82); Laguna Niguel, California, U.S.
- Listed height: 5 ft 11 in (1.80 m)
- Listed weight: 223 lb (101 kg)

Career information
- High school: Hammond (IN)
- College: Washington (1938-1941)
- NFL draft: 1942: 3rd round, 24th overall pick

Career history
- Green Bay Packers (1945); Los Angeles Dons (1946-1948)

Awards and highlights
- Consensus All-American (1941); First-team All-American (1940); 2× First-team All-PCC (1940, 1941)

Career NFL/AAFC statistics
- Games played: 42
- Starts: 13
- Stats at Pro Football Reference

Raymond William Frankowski (September 14, 1919 – November 27, 2001) was an American professional football player who was a guard in the National Football League (NFL) and the All-America Football Conference (AAFC). He played college football for the Washington Huskies, earning first-team All-American honors as a junior in 1940 and was named a consensus All-American as a senior in 1941.

== Biography ==
=== Early life ===
Frankowski was born on September 14, 1919, in Chicago, Illinois, United States. He attended Hammond High School in Hammond, Indiana, where he was a star wrestler and football player. On the mat, Hammond was undefeated for three straight years, winning every match by pin within five minutes. On the gridiron he demonstrated superior skill as a lineman, helping lead the Hammond Wildcats to the Indiana state football championship during his 1937–38 senior year.

In the spring of 1938, Frankowski announced that he would be traveling west, entering the University of Washington, being joined in the journey to the Puget Sound by Hammond High teammate Herky Bereolos. Perhaps smoothing the transition was a promise of summertime employment on an Alaskan fishing trawler made to the two young Hoosier guards by a Husky alumnus and booster. The pair arrived in Seattle in mid-June, where they met with Washington head coach Jimmy Phelan — formerly the head coach at Purdue University and thus already well-familiar with the abilities of the Indiana high school champion linemen.

Frankowski as a member of the Los Angeles Dons in 1946.

While at Washington Frankowski was again successful with his athletic pursuits, being twice named a member of the All-America team and winning a place on the school's fencing and wrestling teams.

Frankowski (top center) on the program for a November 2, 1947 game with the rival San Francisco 49ers.

== Professional football career ==
Frankowski was selected by the Green Bay Packers in the third round of the 1942 NFL draft, who used the 24th pick of the draft, and played that season with the team. Following his time with the Packers, he would play three seasons with the Los Angeles Dons of the All-America Football Conference.
