= 1940 Stanford Indians football team =

American college football season

1940 Stanford Indians football

National champion (Billingsley, Helms, Poling) (Note: NCAA-recognized selectors the Billingsley Report, Helms Athletic Foundation, and Poling System declared Stanford to be the 1940 championship team.) PCC champion Rose Bowl champion

Rose Bowl, W 21–13 vs. Nebraska
- Conference: Pacific Coast Conference

Ranking
- AP: No. 2
- Record: 10–0 (7–0 PCC)
- Head coach: Clark Shaughnessy (1st season)
- Offensive scheme: T formation
- Home stadium: Stanford Stadium

1940 Pacific Coast Conference football standings
	Conf.					Overall
Team	W		L		T	W		L		T
No. 2 Stanford $	7	–	0	–	0	10	–	0	–	0
No. 10 Washington	7	–	1	–	0	7	–	2	–	0
Oregon State	4	–	3	–	1	5	–	3	–	1
Washington State	3	–	4	–	2	4	–	4	–	2
Oregon	3	–	4	–	1	4	–	4	–	1
California	3	–	4	–	0	4	–	6	–	0
USC	2	–	3	–	2	3	–	4	–	2
Montana	1	–	2	–	0	4	–	4	–	1
UCLA	1	–	6	–	0	1	–	9	–	0
Idaho	0	–	4	–	0	1	–	7	–	1
$ – Conference champion; Rankings from AP Poll

The 1940 Stanford Indians football team, nicknamed the "Wow Boys", (Note: The "Wow Boys" nickname was a nod to Stanford's "Vow Boys" teams of the mid-1930s.) represented Stanford University as a member of the Pacific Coast Conference (PCC) during the 1940 college football season. First-year head coach Clark Shaughnessy inherited a team that finished with a 1–7–1 record the previous season. He installed his own version of the T formation, a system that had largely fallen into disuse since the 1890s and was viewed as obsolete. The Indians shocked observers when they won all ten of their games including the Rose Bowl, which prompted several selectors to declare them the 1940 national champions. Stanford's dramatic reversal of fortunes prompted football programs across the nation to abandon the single-wing formation in favor of the newly reminted T formation.

== Schedule ==
Date	Opponent	Rank	Site	Result	Attendance	Source
September 28	at San Francisco*		Kezar Stadium; San Francisco, CA	W 27–0	25,000	
October 5	Oregon		Stanford Stadium; Stanford, CA	W 13–0	20,000	
October 12	Santa Clara*		Stanford Stadium; Stanford, CA	W 7–6	55,000	
October 19	at No. 19 Washington State	No. 10	Rogers Field; Pullman, WA	W 26–14	23,000	
October 26	No. 17 USC	No. 9	Stanford Stadium; Stanford, CA (rivalry)	W 21–7	60,000	
November 2	at UCLA	No. 6	Los Angeles Memorial Coliseum; Los Angeles, CA	W 20–14	55,000	
November 9	No. 11 Washington	No. 6	Stanford Stadium; Stanford, CA	W 20–10	65,000	
November 16	No. 19 Oregon State	No. 4	Stanford Stadium; Stanford, CA	W 28–14	35,000	
November 30	at California	No. 3	California Memorial Stadium; Berkeley, CA (Big Game)	W 13–7	75,000	
January 1, 1941	vs. No. 7 Nebraska*	No. 2	Rose Bowl; Pasadena, CA (Rose Bowl)	W 21–13	92,000	
*Non-conference game; Rankings from AP Poll released prior to the game; Source:

== Rankings ==
Ranking movements Legend: ██ Increase in ranking ██ Decrease in ranking ( ) = First-place votes
	Week							
Poll	1	2	3	4	5	6	7	Final
AP	10	9	6	6 (3)	4 (12)	3 (24)	3 (15)	2 (44)

== Preseason ==
Clark Shaughnessy had served as the head coach at the University of Chicago since 1930. While there, he developed a new version of the T formation based upon the "pro T" that was concurrently in use by the Chicago Bears of the National Football League. The T formation, in which three backs lined up abreast and behind the quarterback who was himself behind the center, was an obsolescent system that had been disused since the 1890s in favor of the single-wing and double-wing formations. Shaugnessy, however, incorporated several new features in his own version of the T. It utilized flankers and the man-in-motion concept, and it emphasized deception and quickness over the brute force necessitated by the wing formations. Shaughnessy was not very successful at Chicago and his teams never finished a season with more wins than losses. In 1939, the Chicago Maroons compiled a 2–6 record and failed to defeat any of their conference opponents. All six losses were defensive shutouts, the worst being an 85–0 rout by Michigan. After the season, the University of Chicago disbanded its football program. Instead of remaining at Chicago, where he also held a position as a professor and earned a comfortable salary of $10,000 per year, Shaughnessy elected to continue coaching football, which he described as his hobby and passion. For 1940, he was hired by Stanford University whose Indians had finished the previous season with a 1–7–1 record.

Stanford center Milt Vucinich said, "We'd been reading about all those beatings Shaughnessy's men had taken, so we were joking among ourselves that wasn't it just like Stanford to hire somebody like this to coach us." In his first address to the team, Shaughnessy told them, "Boys, I am not to be addressed as 'Clark' or, especially, [the nickname of] 'Soup'. To you, I am 'Mr. Shaughnessy' or 'Coach.' Nothing else. I am a professor of football . . . Now, I have a formation for you that if you learn it well will take you to the Rose Bowl." He asserted that one of his plays, a line plunge by a back without a blocker, would score ten to twelve touchdowns alone, which was more than the Indians had scored the entire previous season. The players were understandably skeptical, and they were not alone. Football innovator and single-wing proponent Glenn "Pop" Warner said before the season, "If Stanford wins a single game with that crazy formation, you can throw all the football I ever knew into the Pacific Ocean." Shaughnessy later discovered that the players, who were mostly returners from the 1939 team, were talented, but not suited to the single wing. As a contemporary newspaper noted, "The 1939 team looked great in some games and sour in others. The machinery was there but it wasn't running as smoothly as had been hoped for."

== Season ==
"It couldn't happen—but it did . . . Clark Shaughnessy, who coached the University of Chicago football team to dismal defeat and eventual extinction, is now leading an unbeaten, untied Stanford eleven toward the nation's greatest gridiron glory."

— The Milwaukee Journal

Stanford opened the season with a road game against San Francisco U at Kezar Stadium. It was part of the first-ever major college football doubleheader, which also featured Santa Clara and Utah. The Indians defeated San Francisco convincingly, 27–0. In attendance was their next opponents' head coach, Tex Oliver of Oregon, and he said, "Half of the time neither we or the spectators knew who was the ballcarrier until someone would dart out from the sidelines with the pigskin under his arms... and it was probably quarterback Frank Albert." Oliver added, "If we expect to stop their attack, we'll have to work fast", and immediately returned home to conduct intense practices in preparation for Stanford.

The extra preparation did not halt the Stanford attack, however, and according to Harold Parrott in The Milwaukee Journal, "the duped Webfoots chased phantom ball carriers all over the field. They tackled everybody but the nonchalant-looking Stanford man who actually had the ball." Stanford won again, 13–0. The following week, the Indians narrowly edged Santa Clara, 7–6, to remain "the only untied, undefeated team in the Far West." After defeating Washington State at home, 26–14, Stanford met the defending Pacific Coast Conference (PCC) champions, Southern California. With 90 seconds remaining to play, the game was tied at seven, but Stanford used its deception tactics to score two touchdowns to win, 21–7.

The Indians then beat UCLA the next week in Los Angeles, 20–14. Washington, the only other team with a perfect Pacific Coast Conference record, led Stanford by a touchdown at half time. In the third quarter, the Huskies extended their lead when they capitalized on an interception with a field goal. Before the end of the period, though, Albert engineered two long drives that culminated in touchdowns. In the final quarter, Indians back Pete Kmetovic caught an interception and tallied the final score. Stanford won, 20–10. After beating Oregon State, 28–14, Stanford traveled to Berkeley to face California in the annual rivalry, the "Big Game". The Indians defeated the Bears, 13–7, to guarantee a Rose Bowl invitation in lieu of Washington, which despite losing to Stanford head-to-head, had beaten UCLA more convincingly, 41–0.

== Postseason ==
In the final Associated Press Poll, which was published on December 2 before the bowl games, Stanford was ranked second in the US behind Minnesota. On December 1, Stanford accepted its invitation to represent the Pacific coast in the 1941 Rose Bowl, and Nebraska was selected to represent the East. Nebraska had compiled an 8–1 record with its only loss against Minnesota. Pundits deemed Stanford to be the favorite to win the Rose Bowl. The game was attended by 91,300 spectators and each team was paid $140,916 for its participation.

Nebraska received the opening kickoff and halfback Butch Luther returned it 27 yards to the Stanford 48-yard line. The drive culminated in a short rush by fullback Ike Francis, and with the extra point, the Cornhuskers took a 7–0 lead on the first possession. Stanford drove into Nebraska territory, but fumbled the ball away on the 28-yard line. The Cornhuskers punted it away and the Indians mounted a touchdown drive to equalize the score. In the second quarter, Nebraska recovered a fumbled punt return and on the subsequent possession scored on a 33-yard pass. Stanford responded immediately, and Albert passed to Hugh Gallarneau for a 40-yard touchdown to tie the game at 13. Albert made the extra point kick to take the lead. In the third quarter, the Indians drove 76 yards to within inches of the opposing goal line, but the Cornhusker defense held and took over on downs. Nebraska punted the ball away and Kmetovic returned it 40 yards for a touchdown. Albert made the extra point and Stanford went on to win the game, 21–13.

After the season, three NCAA-recognized selectors named Stanford the national championship team. At the time, the Poling System bestowed that title upon the Indians. In later years, the Billingsley Report and the Helms Athletic Foundation retroactively declared Stanford the 1940 champions. Frank Albert was named a consensus All-American at quarterback and finished fourth in the Heisman Trophy voting. The Newspaper Enterprise Association named Hugh Gallarneau an All-America back.

== Legacy ==
An earlier doubter, Pop Warner acknowledged the unexpected success of the revived formation. During Stanford's meteoric 1940 season, Warner said, "Shaughnessy has taken that T formation we used when I played at Cornell in 1892 and made it work as it has never worked before. This is because he has added his own ideas. There is no mystery about Shaughnessy's success at Stanford as I see it. The only mystery is where the ball is on some of those tricky plays of his."

The 1940 Stanford Indians, who became known as the "Wow Boys", proved the value of the T formation, and in response, football coaches around the nation adopted it for their own teams. Notre Dame coach Frank Leahy caused a stir in 1942 when he scrapped the venerable box formation in favor of the T. A survey conducted by Football Digest at the end of the decade revealed that 250 of the 350 best football teams were utilizing the formation. Shaughnessy's T gave rise to various incarnations, including the pro set, power I, veer, and the wishbone formation. Clark Shaughnessy was inducted into the College Football Hall of Fame in 1968. Today, his variant of the T formation remains in use, with some modifications, and according to Sports Illustrated, it "remains the longest-running formation in the history of the game".

== Players drafted by the NFL ==
Player	Position	Draft year	Round	Pick	NFL club
Norm Standlee	Fullback	1941	1	3	Chicago Bears
Hugh Gallarneau	Right Halfback	1941	3	23	Chicago Bears
Pete Kmetovic	Left Halfback	1942	1	3	Philadelphia Eagles
Frankie Albert	Quarterback	1942	1	10	Chicago Bears
Vic Lindskog	Center	1942	2	13	Philadelphia Eagles
Fred Meyer	End	1942	12	103	Philadelphia Eagles
