= 1940 Oregon Ducks football team =

American college football season

1940 Oregon Ducks football
- Conference: Pacific Coast Conference
- Record: 4–4–1 (3–4–1 PCC)
- Head coach: Tex Oliver (3rd season)
- Captain: None
- Home stadium: Hayward Field, Multnomah Stadium

1940 Pacific Coast Conference football standings
	Conf.					Overall
Team	W		L		T	W		L		T
No. 2 Stanford $	7	–	0	–	0	10	–	0	–	0
No. 10 Washington	7	–	1	–	0	7	–	2	–	0
Oregon State	4	–	3	–	1	5	–	3	–	1
Washington State	3	–	4	–	2	4	–	4	–	2
Oregon	3	–	4	–	1	4	–	4	–	1
California	3	–	4	–	0	4	–	6	–	0
USC	2	–	3	–	2	3	–	4	–	2
Montana	1	–	2	–	0	4	–	4	–	1
UCLA	1	–	6	–	0	1	–	9	–	0
Idaho	0	–	4	–	0	1	–	7	–	1
$ – Conference champion; Rankings from AP Poll

The 1940 Oregon Ducks football team represented the University of Oregon ass a member of the Pacific Coast Conference (PCC) during the 1940 college football season. In their third season under head coach Tex Oliver, the Ducks compiled a 4–4–1 record (3–4–1 in PCC, fifth), and outscored their opponents, 100 to 58.

Oregon was ranked at No. 32 (out of 697 college football teams) in the final rankings under the Litkenhous Difference by Score system for 1940.

Three home games were played on campus at Hayward Field in Eugene and one at Multnomah Stadium in Portland.

== Schedule ==
Date	Opponent	Site	Result	Attendance	Source
September 27	San Diego Marines*	Hayward Field; Eugene, OR	W 12–2	4,500	
October 5	at Stanford	Stanford Stadium; Stanford, CA	L 0–13	20,000	
October 12	Washington	Multnomah Stadium; Portland, OR (rivalry)	L 0–10	31,000	
October 19	at No. 17 USC	Los Angeles Memorial Coliseum; Los Angeles, CA	L 0–13	35,000	
October 26	at Washington State	Rogers Field; Pullman, WA	T 6–6	6,500	
November 2	Montana	Hayward Field; Eugene, OR	W 38–0	4,500	
November 9	UCLA	Hayward Field; Eugene, OR	W 18–0	7,500	
November 16	at California	California Memorial Stadium; Berkeley, CA	L 6–14		
November 30	at Oregon State	Bell Field; Corvallis, OR (rivalry)	W 20–0	18,000	
*Non-conference game; Rankings from AP Poll released prior to the game; Source:
