= 1941 Rose Bowl =

American college football game

- 27th Rose Bowl Game
| Nebraska Cornhuskers | Stanford Indians |
| (8–1) | (9–0) |
| MVIAA | PCC |
| 13 | 21 |
| Head coach: Biff Jones | Head coach: Clark Shaughnessy |
| AP 7 | AP 2 |
| | 1 | 2 | 3 | 4 | Total |
|---|---|---|---|---|---|
| Nebraska | 7 | 6 | 0 | 0 | 13 |
| Stanford | 7 | 7 | 7 | 0 | 21 |
- Date: January 1, 1941
- Season: 1940
- Stadium: Rose Bowl
- Location: Pasadena, California
- MVP: Pete Kmetovic (Stanford HB)
- Favorite: Stanford by 7
- Attendance: 92,000

The 1941 Rose Bowl was the twenty-seventh edition of the college football bowl game, played on January 1, 1941 at the Rose Bowl in Pasadena, California. Unbeaten and second-ranked Stanford of the Pacific Coast Conference defeated No. 7 Nebraska of the MVIAA to claim a share of the national championship.

It was Nebraska's first bowl game and Stanford's eighth, all in the Rose Bowl, and is the only time the programs have met. The 1941 game was the last edition of the Rose Bowl to feature a team from the MVIAA, Big Eight, or Big 12 until 2002.

== Teams ==
=== Nebraska ===
Nebraska entered 8–1 and ranked seventh nationally, its only loss a 13–7 defeat at top-ranked Minnesota. After declining previous bowl invitations, celebrations reportedly lasted for 24 hours Lincoln after the announcement of the school's first postseason appearance. University classes were canceled, and students stormed the Nebraska State Capitol demanding the governor lead a rendition of "Dear Old Nebraska U." The Cornhuskers were led by fourth-year head coach Biff Jones and featured two All-Americans, Warren Alfson and Forrest Behm.

=== Stanford ===
Stanford was led by first-year head coach Clark Shaughnessy, who brought his revolutionary T formation to Palo Alto, helping the Indians to a 9–0 regular season just a year after finishing 1–7–1. Shaughnessy's offensive design was filled with fakes and pitchouts, and had quarterback Frankie Albert take snaps directly under center, a rarity at the time. His 1940 team earned the nickname "Wow Boys," a nod to Stanford's "Vow Boys" teams of the mid-1930s. The Indians entered the Rose Bowl ranked second nationally.

== Game ==
Nebraska received the opening kickoff and marched fifty yards to take a quick 7–0 lead. Albert led a game-tying touchdown drive, after which Stanford forced an NU punt, but Pete Kmetovic fumbled deep in his own territory. Nebraska reclaimed the lead on a deep pass to Allen Zikmund. After a missed extra point and a leaping touchdown by Hugh Gallarneau, Stanford led 14–13 at halftime.

Trailing by one late in the third quarter, Nebraska stopped Stanford on four consecutive goal-line runs. The Cornhuskers punted on first down from their own one-yard line, which was returned for a winding touchdown by Kmetovic. It made the score 21–13, which stood through the fourth quarter as the final tally. Sportswriter Cy Sherman wrote that while the game was evenly matched on the lines, backfield "wizards" Albert and Kmetovic (named the game's most valuable player) made the difference.

=== Scoring summary ===
| Qtr | Team | Detail | NU | STAN |
|---|---|---|---|---|
| 1 | NU | Vike Francis 2-yd run (Francis kick) | 7 | 0 |
| 1 | STAN | Hugh Gallarneau 9-yd run (Frankie Albert kick) | 7 | 7 |
| 2 | NU | Allen Zikmund 33-yd pass from Herm Rohrig (kick blocked) | 13 | 7 |
| 2 | STAN | Gallarneau 41-yd pass from Albert (Albert kick) | 13 | 14 |
| 3 | STAN | Pete Kmetovic 39-yd punt return (Albert kick) | 13 | 21 |

=== Team statistics ===
Official statistics vary slightly between the schools. Statistics shown are from Nebraska's records.

| Statistic | Nebraska | Stanford |
|---|---|---|
| First downs | 9 | 15 |
| Rushing yards | 58 | 202 |
| Comp.–att.–yards | 3–15–70 | 7–15–74 |
| Total offense | 128 | 276 |
| Turnovers | 4 | 4 |

== Aftermath ==
Stanford finished a perfect 10–0 and was named national champion by several selectors, though Minnesota was named champion of the AP poll despite not playing a bowl game. Nebraska head coach Biff Jones, whose only two losses in 1940 were to the Golden Gophers and Indians, was noncommittal when asked which team deserved the title.

Shaughnessy's rapid transformation of Stanford's program thrust the T formation, an afterthought since the 1890s, into the national spotlight. Nebraska adopted the formation the following year, with significantly less success than the Indians. It became the most widely used offensive scheme in college football throughout the 1940s and 1950s, leading Shuaghnessy to become known as "the father of the T formation."

As the program's first bowl, the game was remembered fondly by Nebraska supporters; Bob Devaney arrived in Lincoln in 1962 and later joked it was years before he learned NU actually lost the 1941 Rose Bowl.

== In popular culture ==
This game is described by David Dodge in his 1942 mystery novel Shear the Black Sheep.
