= Jim Kisselburgh =

American football player (1919–1996)

- Kisselburgh in 1940

No. 49
- Positions: Fullback; Linebacker

Personal information
- Born: September 4, 1919; Ashland, Wisconsin, U.S.
- Died: July 10, 1996 (aged 76); El Paso, Texas, U.S.
- Listed height: 6 ft 0 in (1.83 m)
- Listed weight: 190 lb (86 kg)

Career information
- College: Oregon State
- NFL draft: 1941: 6th round, 44 (by the Cleveland Rams)th overall pick

Awards and highlights
- Third-team All-American (1940); First-team All-PCC (1939); 2× Second-team All-PCC (1938, 1940)

Alexander James Kisselburgh, Jr. (September 4, 1919 – July 10, 1996) was an American football player. He played college football for the Oregon State Beavers football team from 1938 to 1940 and was selected by the Associated Press as a third-team player on the 1940 College Football All-America Team.

In January 1941, he joined the United States Army Air Corps. He joined the Army All-Star West football team in 1942. He flew 35 missions over the European Theater during World War II and was shot down northeast of Munich in February 1944; he spent the rest of the war in a German prisoner of war camp in Moosburg, Germany. He returned to the United States in June 1945.
