= 1940 Washington Huskies football team =

American college football season

1940 Washington Huskies football
- Conference: Pacific Coast Conference

Ranking
- AP: No. 10
- Record: 7–2 (7–1 PCC)
- Head coach: Jimmy Phelan (11th season)
- Captain: Bill Marx
- Home stadium: University of Washington Stadium

1940 Pacific Coast Conference football standings
	Conf.					Overall
Team	W		L		T	W		L		T
No. 2 Stanford $	7	–	0	–	0	10	–	0	–	0
No. 10 Washington	7	–	1	–	0	7	–	2	–	0
Oregon State	4	–	3	–	1	5	–	3	–	1
Washington State	3	–	4	–	2	4	–	4	–	2
Oregon	3	–	4	–	1	4	–	4	–	1
California	3	–	4	–	0	4	–	6	–	0
USC	2	–	3	–	2	3	–	4	–	2
Montana	1	–	2	–	0	4	–	4	–	1
UCLA	1	–	6	–	0	1	–	9	–	0
Idaho	0	–	4	–	0	1	–	7	–	1
$ – Conference champion; Rankings from AP Poll

The 1940 Washington Huskies football team was an American football team that represented the University of Washington during the 1940 college football season. In its 11th season under head coach Jimmy Phelan, the team compiled a 7–2 record, finished in second place in the Pacific Coast Conference, was ranked No. 10 in the final AP Poll, and outscored its opponents by a combined total of 169 to 54. The Huskies' only two losses came to Minnesota and Stanford teams that were ranked Nos. 1 and 2, respectively, in the final AP Poll. Bill Marx was the team captain.

== Schedule ==
Date	Opponent	Rank	Site	Result	Attendance	Source
September 28	at Minnesota*		Memorial Stadium; Minneapolis, MN	L 14–19	46,000	
October 5	Idaho		University of Washington Stadium; Seattle, WA	W 21–0	23,000	
October 12	at Oregon		Multnomah Stadium; Portland, OR (rivalry)	W 10–0	31,000	
October 19	No. 18 Oregon State	No. 16	University of Washington Stadium; Seattle, WA	W 19–0	36,000	
October 26	California	No. 16	University of Washington Stadium; Seattle, WA	W 7–6	25,000	
November 9	at No. 6 Stanford	No. 11	Stanford Stadium; Stanford, CA	L 10–20	65,000	
November 16	USC	No. 17	University of Washington Stadium; Seattle, WA	W 14–0	30,000	
November 23	at UCLA	No. 13	Los Angeles Memorial Coliseum; Los Angeles, CA	W 41–0	30,000	
November 30	Washington State	No. 12	University of Washington Stadium; Seattle, WA (rivalry)	W 33–9	25,000	
*Non-conference game; Rankings from AP Poll released prior to the game; Source:

== Rankings ==
Ranking movements Legend: ██ Increase in ranking ██ Decrease in ranking т = Tied with team above or below
	Week							
Poll	1	2	3	4	5	6	7	Final
AP	16	16	13	11	17т	13	12	10

== NFL draft selections ==
Three University of Washington Huskies were selected in the 1941 NFL draft, which lasted 22 rounds with 204 selections.

= Husky Hall of Fame

Player	Position	Round	Pick	NFL club
Rudy Mucha	Center	1	4	Cleveland Rams
Dean McAdams	Back	1	8	Brooklyn Dodgers
Jay McDowell	End	3	4	Cleveland Rams
