= 1940 Washington State Cougars football team =

American college football season

1940 Washington State Cougars football
- Conference: Pacific Coast Conference
- Record: 4–4–2 (3–4–2 PCC)
- Head coach: Babe Hollingbery (15th season)
- Captain: Don Greeley
- Home stadium: Rogers Field

1940 Pacific Coast Conference football standings
	Conf.					Overall
Team	W		L		T	W		L		T
No. 2 Stanford $	7	–	0	–	0	10	–	0	–	0
No. 10 Washington	7	–	1	–	0	7	–	2	–	0
Oregon State	4	–	3	–	1	5	–	3	–	1
Washington State	3	–	4	–	2	4	–	4	–	2
Oregon	3	–	4	–	1	4	–	4	–	1
California	3	–	4	–	0	4	–	6	–	0
USC	2	–	3	–	2	3	–	4	–	2
Montana	1	–	2	–	0	4	–	4	–	1
UCLA	1	–	6	–	0	1	–	9	–	0
Idaho	0	–	4	–	0	1	–	7	–	1
$ – Conference champion; Rankings from AP Poll

The 1940 Washington State Cougars football team was an American football team that represented Washington State College during the 1940 college football season. Fifteenth-year head coach Babe Hollingbery led the team to a 3–4–2 mark in the Pacific Coast Conference (PCC) and 4–4–2 overall.

Washington State was ranked at No. 71 (out of 697 college football teams) in the final rankings under the Litkenhous Difference by Score system for 1940.

The Cougars played their three home games, all in October, on campus at Rogers Field in Pullman, Washington. Two road games were played nearby, in Moscow and Spokane.

== Schedule ==
Date	Opponent	Rank	Site	Result	Attendance	Source
September 28	at USC		Los Angeles Memorial Coliseum; Los Angeles, CA	T 14–14	40,000	
October 5	Montana		Rogers Field; Pullman, WA	W 13–0	7,500	
October 12	at California		California Memorial Stadium; Berkeley, CA	W 9–6	25,000	
October 19	No. 10 Stanford	No. 19	Rogers Field; Pullman, WA	L 14–26	23,000	
October 26	Oregon		Rogers Field; Pullman, WA	T 6–6	6,500	
November 2	at Idaho		Neale Stadium; Moscow, ID (Battle of the Palouse)	W 26–0	4,500	.
November 9	at Oregon State		Bell Field; Corvallis, OR	L 0–21	8,000	
November 16	at UCLA		Los Angeles Memorial Coliseum; Los Angeles	L 26–34	35,000	
November 23	at Gonzaga*		Gonzaga Stadium; Spokane, WA	W 14–7	8,000	
November 30	at No. 12 Washington		Husky Stadium; Seattle, WA (rivalry)	L 9–33	25,000	
*Non-conference game; Rankings from AP Poll released prior to the game

== Rankings ==
Ranking movements Legend: ██ Increase in ranking ██ Decrease in ranking — = Not ranked
	Week							
Poll	1	2	3	4	5	6	7	Final
AP	19	—	—	—	—	—	—	—
