= 1940 UCLA Bruins football team =

American college football season

1940 UCLA Bruins football
- Conference: Pacific Coast Conference
- Record: 1–9 (1–6 PCC)
- Head coach: Edwin C. Horrell (2nd season)
- Home stadium: Los Angeles Memorial Coliseum

1940 Pacific Coast Conference football standings
	Conf.					Overall
Team	W		L		T	W		L		T
No. 2 Stanford $	7	–	0	–	0	10	–	0	–	0
No. 10 Washington	7	–	1	–	0	7	–	2	–	0
Oregon State	4	–	3	–	1	5	–	3	–	1
Washington State	3	–	4	–	2	4	–	4	–	2
Oregon	3	–	4	–	1	4	–	4	–	1
California	3	–	4	–	0	4	–	6	–	0
USC	2	–	3	–	2	3	–	4	–	2
Montana	1	–	2	–	0	4	–	4	–	1
UCLA	1	–	6	–	0	1	–	9	–	0
Idaho	0	–	4	–	0	1	–	7	–	1
$ – Conference champion; Rankings from AP Poll

The 1940 UCLA Bruins football team represented the University of California, Los Angeles (UCLA) in the 1940 college football season. The Bruins offense scored 79 points while the defense allowed 174 points. Coached by Edwin C. Horrell, the Bruins finished the season with a 1–9 record.

UCLA was ranked at No. 60 (out of 697 college football teams) in the final rankings under the Litkenhous Difference by Score system for 1940.

== Schedule ==
Date	Opponent	Site	Result	Attendance	Source
September 27	SMU*	Los Angeles Memorial Coliseum; Los Angeles, CA	L 6–9	70,000	
October 4	Santa Clara*	Los Angeles Memorial Coliseum; Los Angeles, CA	L 6–9	45,000	
October 12	Texas A&M*	Los Angeles Memorial Coliseum; Los Angeles, CA	L 0–7	60,000	
October 19	at California	California Memorial Stadium; Berkeley, CA (rivalry)	L 7–9	40,000	
October 26	Oregon State	Los Angeles Memorial Coliseum; Los Angeles, CA	L 0–7	25,000	
November 2	No. 6 Stanford	Los Angeles Memorial Coliseum; Los Angeles, CA	L 14–20	55,000	
November 9	at Oregon	Hayward Field; Eugene, OR	L 0–18	7,500	
November 16	Washington State	Los Angeles Memorial Coliseum; Los Angeles, CA	W 34–26	35,000	
November 23	No. 13 Washington	Los Angeles Memorial Coliseum; Los Angeles, CA	L 0–41	30,000	
November 30	at USC	Los Angeles Memorial Coliseum; Los Angeles, CA (Victory Bell)	L 12–28	65,000	
*Non-conference game; Rankings from AP Poll released prior to the game; Source:

== 1940 Bruins in professional sports ==
The following players were claimed in the 1941 NFL draft.

Player	Position	Round	Pick	NFL club
Jack Sommers	Center	11	92	Chicago Cardinals
Del Lyman	Tackle	14	126	Green Bay Packers

Jackie Robinson went on to a career in Major League Baseball.
