= 1940 California Golden Bears football team =

American college football season

1940 California Golden Bears football
- Conference: Pacific Coast Conference
- Record: 4–6 (3–4 PCC)
- Head coach: Stub Allison (6th season)
- Home stadium: California Memorial Stadium

1940 Pacific Coast Conference football standings
	Conf.					Overall
Team	W		L		T	W		L		T
No. 2 Stanford $	7	–	0	–	0	10	–	0	–	0
No. 10 Washington	7	–	1	–	0	7	–	2	–	0
Oregon State	4	–	3	–	1	5	–	3	–	1
Washington State	3	–	4	–	2	4	–	4	–	2
Oregon	3	–	4	–	1	4	–	4	–	1
California	3	–	4	–	0	4	–	6	–	0
USC	2	–	3	–	2	3	–	4	–	2
Montana	1	–	2	–	0	4	–	4	–	1
UCLA	1	–	6	–	0	1	–	9	–	0
Idaho	0	–	4	–	0	1	–	7	–	1
$ – Conference champion; Rankings from AP Poll

The 1940 California Golden Bears football team season was an American football team that represented the University of California, Berkeley during the 1940 college football season. Under head coach Stub Allison, the team compiled an overall record of 4–6 and 3–4 in conference.

California was ranked at No. 40 (out of 697 college football teams) in the final rankings under the Litkenhous Difference by Score system for 1940.

== Schedule ==
Date	Opponent	Site	Result	Attendance	Source
September 28	Michigan*	California Memorial Stadium; Berkeley, CA	L 0–41	35,401	
October 5	Saint Mary's*	California Memorial Stadium; Berkeley, CA	W 9–6	50,000	
October 12	Washington State	California Memorial Stadium; Berkeley, CA	L 6–9	25,000	
October 19	UCLA	California Memorial Stadium; Berkeley, CA (rivalry)	W 9–7	40,000	
October 26	at No. 16 Washington	Husky Stadium; Seattle, WA	L 6–7	25,000	
November 2	Oregon State	California Memorial Stadium; Berkeley, CA	L 13–19	20,000	
November 9	at USC	Los Angeles Memorial Coliseum; Los Angeles, CA	W 20–7	55,000	
November 16	Oregon	California Memorial Stadium; Berkeley, CA	W 14–6		
November 30	No. 3 Stanford	California Memorial Stadium; Berkeley, CA (Big Game)	L 7–13	75,000	
December 28	at Georgia Tech*	Grant Field; Atlanta, GA	L 0–13	7,000	
*Non-conference game; Rankings from AP Poll released prior to the game
