= 1940 USC Trojans football team =

American college football season

1940 USC Trojans football
- Conference: Pacific Coast Conference
- Record: 3–4–2 (2–3–2 PCC)
- Head coach: Howard Jones (16th season)
- Captain: Ed Dempsey
- Home stadium: Los Angeles Memorial Coliseum

1940 Pacific Coast Conference football standings
	Conf.					Overall
Team	W		L		T	W		L		T
No. 2 Stanford $	7	–	0	–	0	10	–	0	–	0
No. 10 Washington	7	–	1	–	0	7	–	2	–	0
Oregon State	4	–	3	–	1	5	–	3	–	1
Washington State	3	–	4	–	2	4	–	4	–	2
Oregon	3	–	4	–	1	4	–	4	–	1
California	3	–	4	–	0	4	–	6	–	0
USC	2	–	3	–	2	3	–	4	–	2
Montana	1	–	2	–	0	4	–	4	–	1
UCLA	1	–	6	–	0	1	–	9	–	0
Idaho	0	–	4	–	0	1	–	7	–	1
$ – Conference champion; Rankings from AP Poll

The 1940 USC Trojans football team represented the University of Southern California (USC) in the 1940 college football season. In their 16th year under head coach Howard Jones, the Trojans compiled a 3–4–2 record (2–3–2 against conference opponents), finished in seventh place in the Pacific Coast Conference, and were outscored by their opponents by a combined total of 98 to 88.

USC was ranked at No. 41 (out of 697 college football teams) in the final rankings under the Litkenhous Difference by Score system for 1940.

== Schedule ==
Date	Opponent	Rank	Site	Result	Attendance	Source
September 28	Washington State		Los Angeles Memorial Coliseum; Los Angeles, CA	T 14–14	40,000	
October 5	Oregon State		Los Angeles Memorial Coliseum; Los Angeles, CA	T 0–0	55,000	
October 12	at Illinois*		Memorial Stadium; Champaign, IL	W 13–7	30,125	
October 19	Oregon	No. 17	Los Angeles Memorial Coliseum; Los Angeles, CA	W 13–0	35,000	
October 26	at No. 9 Stanford	No. 17	Stanford Stadium; Stanford, CA (rivalry)	L 7–21	60,000	
November 9	California		Los Angeles Memorial Coliseum; Los Angeles, CA	L 7–20	55,000	
November 16	at No. 17 Washington		Husky Stadium; Seattle, WA	L 0–14	30,000	
November 30	UCLA		Los Angeles Memorial Coliseum; Los Angeles, CA (Victory Bell)	W 28–12	65,000	
December 7	Notre Dame*^{†}		Los Angeles Memorial Coliseum; Los Angeles, CA (rivalry)	L 6–10	85,808	
*Non-conference game; ^{†}Homecoming; Rankings from AP Poll released prior to the game; Source:

== Rankings ==
Ranking movements Legend: ██ Increase in ranking ██ Decrease in ranking — = Not ranked
	Week							
Poll	1	2	3	4	5	6	7	Final
AP	17	17	—	—	—	—	—	—
