= Ray Newman (American football) =

American football coach and scout (1922–2017)

Biographical details
- Born: August 11, 1922; Wilsall, Montana, U.S.
- Died: February 8, 2017 (aged 94); Phoenix, Arizona, U.S.

Playing career

Football
- 1947–1948: Boise
- 1949: Idaho State
- Position: End

Coaching career (HC unless noted)

Football
- 1952–1956: Sanger HS (CA) (assistant)
- 1957–1958: Bakersfield (backfield)
- 1959–1966: Bakersfield

Track
- 1952–1957: Sanger HS (CA)
- 1957–?: Bakersfield (assistant)

Administrative career (AD unless noted)
- 1967–1971: New Orleans Saints (scout)
- 1971–1978: San Diego Chargers (scout)
- 1978–?: Edmonton Eskimos (scout)

Head coaching record
- Overall: 65–11–1 (junior college football)
- Bowls: 3–2

Accomplishments and honors

Championships
- Football; 1 junior college national (1959); 3 Metropolitan Conference (1959, 1961, 1963)

Ray Bowen Newman (August 11, 1922 – February 8, 2017) was an American football coach and scout. He served as the head football coach at Bakersfield College in Bakersfield, California from 1959 to 1966, compiling a record of 65–11–1. He led his 1959 Bakersfield team to an undefeated season, a victory in the Junior Rose Bowl, and a junior college national championship. Newman later worked as a scout for the New Orleans Saints and the San Diego Chargers of the National Football League (NFL) and the Edmonton Eskimos of the Canadian Football League (CFL).

Newman was born on August 11, 1922, in Wilsall, Montana. He graduated from Meridian High School in Meridian, Idaho, where he earned all-state honors playing football as an end in 1940. He played football at Boise Junior College—now known as Boise State University, earning first-team junior college All-American honors in 1948. Newman transferred to Idaho State University, where he lettered in football in 1949. He graduated from Fresno State College—now known as the California State University, Fresno—in 1952.

Newman coached football and track at Sanger High School in Sanger, California from 1952 to 1957. He joined the staff at Bakersfield College in 1957 as an assistant coach in football and track. Newman succeeded Homer Beatty as head football coach at Bakersfield in 1959. He led the Bakersfield Renegades to three Metropolitan Conference titles, two appearances in the Junior Rose Bowl and three appearance in the Potato Bowl, before resigning after the 1966 season. Newman was hired as a western area scout for the Saints in 1967.

Newman died on February 8, 2017, in Phoenix, Arizona.

== Head coaching record ==
=== Junior college football ===
Year	Team	Overall	Conference	Standing	Bowl/playoffs
Bakersfield Renegades (Metropolitan Conference) (1959–1960)
1959	Bakersfield	10–0	7–0	1st	W Junior Rose Bowl
1960	Bakersfield	9–1	6–1	2nd	W Potato Bowl
1961	Bakersfield	9–1	7–0	1st	L Junior Rose Bowl
1962	Bakersfield	6–2–1	5–1–1	2nd	
1963	Bakersfield	9–1	6–1	T–1st	W Potato Bowl
1964	Bakersfield	8–2	5–1	2nd	L Potato Bowl
1965	Bakersfield	7–2	4–2	2rd	
1967	Bakersfield	7–2	5–2	3rd	
Bakersfield:		65–11–1	45–8–1		
Total:		65–11–1			
National championship Conference title Conference division title or championship game berth
