= Gonzaga–Idaho football rivalry =

American college sports rivalry

- Gonzaga Bulldogs Idaho Vandals
- Sport: Football
- First meeting: October 15, 1910; Idaho, 46–6
- Latest meeting: October 10, 1941; Idaho, 21–7

Statistics
- Total meetings: 28
- All-time series: Idaho leads, 16–10–2 (.607)
- Largest victory: Idaho, 54–3 (1913)
- Longest win streak: Idaho, 5 (1910–1915)
- Current win streak: Idaho, 1 (1941–present)

Locations of Gonzaga and Idaho

The Gonzaga–Idaho rivalry was the football game between Gonzaga University and the University of Idaho. The respective campuses, in Spokane, Washington, and Moscow, Idaho, are approximately ninety miles (145 km) apart.

The football teams met 28 times from 1910 to 1941 and Idaho held a slight advantage at 16–10–2 (.607). For the last twenty meetings, from 1921 on, the rivalry was exactly even at 9–9–2 (.500), and the final ten were split at five wins each. They did not meet in 1912, 1917, or 1926, and Idaho did not have a varsity team in 1918. Idaho joined the Pacific Coast Conference (PCC) in 1922, while Gonzaga remained independent.

Gonzaga's dominating wins in 1939 and 1940, both shutouts, were led by halfback Tony Canadeo, a future member of the Pro Football Hall of Fame. With Canadeo in the NFL, Idaho rebounded in 1941 to win 21–7 in Spokane in what was the final game in the series.

During World War II, Gonzaga did not field a team after 1941, while Idaho played in 1942 and went on hiatus in September 1943. After the war, Idaho resumed football for the 1945 season, but Gonzaga opted not to, as its program had been in financial difficulty before the war.

== Game results ==
Gonzaga victories	Idaho victories

No.	Date	Location	Winner	Score
1	October 15, 1910	Moscow, ID	Idaho	46–6
2	October 14, 1911	Moscow, ID	Idaho	22–0
3	October 11, 1913	Spokane, WA	Idaho	54–3
4	October 10, 1914	Moscow, ID	Idaho	5–3
5	November 13, 1915	Spokane, WA	Idaho	6–3
6	October 14, 1916	Moscow, ID	Gonzaga	21–6
7	November 15, 1919	Spokane, WA	Idaho	13–7
8	November 27, 1920	Spokane, WA	Idaho	10–7
9	November 19, 1921	Spokane, WA	Idaho	6–0
10	November 25, 1922	Spokane, WA	Gonzaga	14–7
11	November 3, 1923	Moscow, ID	Idaho	23–0
12	October 4, 1924	Spokane, WA	Tie	0–0
13	October 24, 1925	Spokane, WA	Gonzaga	12–3
14	November 26, 1927	Spokane, WA	Gonzaga	13–0
15	October 6, 1928	Spokane, WA	Tie	6–6

No.	Date	Location	Winner	Score
16	November 16, 1929	Moscow, ID	Gonzaga	20–14
17	November 1, 1930	Spokane, WA	Idaho	26–0
18	October 31, 1931	Moscow, ID	Idaho	7–6
19	October 8, 1932	Spokane, WA	Gonzaga	20–7
20	November 30, 1933	Spokane, WA	Idaho	20–12
21	October 6, 1934	Moscow, ID	Gonzaga	24–20
22	October 5, 1935	Spokane, WA	Gonzaga	7–6
23	October 31, 1936	Spokane, WA	Idaho	18–0
24	November 13, 1937	Spokane, WA	Idaho	6–0
25	October 15, 1938	Moscow, ID	Idaho	26–12
26	October 13, 1939	Spokane, WA	Gonzaga	19–0
27	October 12, 1940	Moscow, ID	Gonzaga	25–0
28	October 10, 1941	Spokane, WA	Idaho	21–7
Series: Idaho leads 16–10–2

- The only one to serve as head coach for both programs was Matty Mathews,
  who was 1–2–1 while with Idaho (1922–1925), and won during his only season with Gonzaga in 1929.
- Idaho's 1918 team was non-varsity, composed of Student Army Training Corps (SATC) players.
  After the Armistice ended World War I on November 11, they played a limited schedule; the first two games were against Gonzaga.
  The opener in Moscow on November 16 was a 13–7 Idaho win, and the next week in Spokane was a 7–7 tie.

== Coaching records ==
From 1919 through 1941; Idaho 11–9–2 (.545)

=== Gonzaga ===
Head coach	Team	Games	Seasons	Wins	Losses	Ties	Pct.
William Higgins	Gonzaga	1	1919	0	1	0	.000
Gus Dorais	Gonzaga	5	1920–1924	1	3	1	.300
Clipper Smith	Gonzaga	4	1925–1928	2	0	1	.833
Matty Mathews	Gonzaga	1	1929	1	0	0	1.000
Ray Flaherty	Gonzaga	1	1930	0	1	0	.000
Mike Pecarovich	Gonzaga	8	1931–1938	3	5	0	.375
Puggy Hunton	Gonzaga	3	1939–1941	2	1	0	.667

=== Idaho ===
Head coach	Team	Games	Seasons	Wins	Losses	Ties	Pct.
Ralph Hutchinson	Idaho	1	1919	1	0	0	1.000
Thomas Kelley	Idaho	2	1920–1921	2	0	0	1.000
Matty Mathews	Idaho	4	1922–1925	1	2	1	.375
Charles Erb	Idaho	2	1926–1928	0	1	1	.250
Leo Calland	Idaho	6	1929–1934	3	3	0	.500
Ted Bank	Idaho	6	1935–1940	3	3	0	.500
Francis Schmidt	Idaho	1	1941–1942	1	0	0	1.000

== Other sports ==
=== Men's basketball ===
Idaho holds the overall lead at 70–64 (.522), but Gonzaga has won the last nine, most recently 80–46 in November 2008 at home in the McCarthey Center. The score at halftime was 47–11 and it was the third consecutive non-competitive game in the series.

Prior to both teams joining the new Big Sky Conference as charter members in 1963, Idaho had a large lead in the series at 55–21 (.724). As conference foes, they met two or three times per season and Gonzaga led at 22–13 (.629), plus two wins in tournaments. After sixteen years in the Big Sky, Gonzaga left for the WCAC in the summer of 1979, but the rivalry continued as an annual game (and occasionally biannual). In the next fifteen games through 1990, Idaho went 10–5, but Gonzaga has since dominated at 14–2 (.875). The last seven games in the series have been played on the Gonzaga campus; the last in Idaho was in early 2000. The Vandals' most recent win was 28 years ago in 1998 at home, and they last won in Spokane in December 1989.

After more than a decade, the teams were scheduled to meet in December 2020 in Spokane, but the game was canceled due to COVID-19 issues.

==== Game results ====
Since December 1979, Gonzaga leads 19–12 (.613), all non-league

Gonzaga victories	Idaho victories

No.	Date	Location	Winner	Score
1	December 21, 1979	Moscow	Idaho	50–49
2	December 6, 1980	Spokane	Idaho	73–69
3	January 2, 1982	Moscow	Idaho	65–57
4	January 8, 1983	Spokane	Idaho	54–51
5	January 7, 1984	Moscow	Gonzaga	59–52
6	January 2, 1985	Spokane	Gonzaga	56–54
7	December 14, 1985	Spokane	Gonzaga	72–61
8	January 4, 1986	Moscow	Idaho	61–60
9	December 5, 1986	Moscow	Idaho	62–55
10	November 27, 1987	Spokane^	Idaho	64–60
11	December 22, 1987	Spokane	Gonzaga	77–57
12	November 26, 1988	Spokane^	Idaho	80–72^{OT}
13	January 3, 1988	Moscow	Gonzaga	66–63
14	January 5, 1989	Spokane	Idaho	67–47
15	January 4, 1990	Moscow	Idaho	70–66
16	December 22, 1991	Spokane	Gonzaga	80–62

No.	Date	Location	Winner	Score
17	December 21, 1992	Moscow	Idaho	82–64
18	December 21, 1993	Spokane	Gonzaga	76–69
19	December 6, 1994	Moscow	Gonzaga	64–58
20	January 3, 1995	Spokane	Gonzaga	75–55
21	December 6, 1997	Spokane	Gonzaga	76–60
22	January 5, 1998	Moscow	Idaho	71–64
23	December 22, 1998	Spokane	Gonzaga	94–55
24	January 4, 2000	Moscow	Gonzaga	60–49
25	November 25, 2000	Spokane	Gonzaga	92–42
26	November 21, 2003	Spokane	Gonzaga	84–63
27	November 24, 2004	Spokane	Gonzaga	88–74
28	November 18, 2005	Spokane	Gonzaga	69–60
29	November 26, 2006	Spokane	Gonzaga	76–51
30	November 13, 2007	Spokane	Gonzaga	80–43
31	November 18, 2008	Spokane	Gonzaga	80–46
Series: Gonzaga leads 19–12

^ Two games were played at the Spokane Coliseum (Nov 1987, Nov 1988), both won by Idaho

=== Baseball ===
In the eleven seasons of baseball in the Big Sky (1964–74), Idaho and Gonzaga each won four league titles. The Vandals were champions in 1964, 1966, 1967, and 1969, while Gonzaga won in 1965, 1971, 1973, and 1974.

Baseball was one of five sports that the Big Sky stopped sponsoring in 1974, so both moved to the new Nor-Pac in 1975, and continued as conference foes until Idaho dropped its program in May 1980. The last eleven seasons of the baseball rivalry (1970–80) saw the Bulldogs dominate at 33–5 (.868).

== See also ==
- List of NCAA college football rivalry games
