= Gonzaga Bulldogs =

Intercollegiate sports teams of Gonzaga University

- University: Gonzaga University
- Nickname: Bulldogs (official); Zags (unofficial)
- Association: NCAA
- Conference: Pac-12
- Athletic director: Chris Standiford
- Location: Spokane, Washington
- Varsity teams: 18
- Basketball arena: McCarthey Athletic Center
- Baseball stadium: Washington Trust Field and Patterson Baseball Complex
- Other venues: Spokane Veterans Memorial Arena
- Colors: Navy blue, white, and red
- Mascot: Spike the Bulldog
- Fight song: Go, Gonzaga!
- Website: gozags.com

The Gonzaga Bulldogs (/ɡənˈzæɡə/), also known unofficially as the Zags, are the intercollegiate athletic teams representing Gonzaga University, located in Spokane, Washington, United States. Gonzaga competes in the National Collegiate Athletic Association (NCAA) Division I as a member of the Pac-12 Conference (Pac-12).

== History ==
Gonzaga University was founded in 1887 by Fr. Joseph Cataldo, a Sicilian-born priest. At one time, Gonzaga went by the nickname of "Fighting Irish" in the 1910s to early 1920s. This name was dropped in 1921 favor of the current "Bulldogs" mascot. Although the school's official mascot is a bulldog, fans and media have long used "Zags" and "Gonzos" as alternate nicknames.

Gonzaga was a member of the Northwest Conference from 1924 to 1925. They were an NAIA school from 1947 to 1958, when they moved to the NCAA as an independent. They were a charter member of the Big Sky Conference in 1963, the only one of the six without a football program. GU moved over to the West Coast Athletic Conference in the summer of 1979, and the Big Sky added Nevada, now in the Mountain West Conference. The WCAC was shortened to today's WCC in 1989.

On October 1, 2024, Gonzaga announced that they would be moving to the Pac-12 Conference for all sports in 2026. They officially moved to the conference on July 1, 2026.

== Sports sponsored ==
Men's sports	Women's sports
Baseball	Basketball
Basketball	Cross country
Cross country	Golf
Golf	Rowing
Rowing	Soccer
Soccer	Tennis
Tennis	Track and field^{†}
Track and field^{†}	Volleyball
† – Track and field includes both indoor and outdoor

=== Men's basketball ===
Men's basketball has been the most successful sport for the Bulldogs. Gonzaga home games have been played at the McCarthey Athletic Center since 2004. The Bulldogs opened the arena with a 100-game win streak, the longest at the time in the NCAA, eventually snapped in February 2007 by the Santa Clara Broncos.

The Bulldogs have generally been a consistently strong team in men's college basketball, having played in 26 consecutive NCAA tournaments and ascending to the #1 ranking in both major polls during the 2012–13 season.

Notable alumni of Gonzaga basketball players include Hall of Famer John Stockton, Domantas Sabonis, Rui Hachimura, Chet Holmgren, Drew Timme, Kelly Olynyk, Adam Morrison, Ronny Turiaf, Brandon Clarke, Zach Collins, Dan Dickau, Austin Daye, Robert Sacre, Andrew Nembhard, Richie Frahm, J. P. Batista, Jeremy Pargo, Blake Stepp, Paul Rogers, Corey Kispert, and Jalen Suggs.

=== Former teams ===
==== Football ====
Gonzaga last fielded a varsity football team 85 years ago in 1941. From 1892 to 1941 (excluding having no teams from 1894 to 1895 & 1900 to 1906), Gonzaga went 129–99–20.

===== Head coaches =====
- 1920–1924 Gus Dorais
- 1925–1928 Clipper Smith
- 1929 Matty Mathews
- 1930 Ray Flaherty
- 1931–1938 Mike Pecarovich
- 1939–1941 Puggy Hunton

==== Boxing ====
The university had a strong boxing program and shared the national title with Idaho in 1950 with a team composed of Carl Maxey, Eli Thomas, and Jim Reilly. Both Maxey and Thomas were undefeated over the course of the season, and Thomas would go on to win the individual championship after another undefeated season the following year. All three were inducted into Gonzaga's Athletic Hall of Fame, with Maxey and Thomas being inducted in 1988 and Reilly in 1989. Gonzaga dropped the sport in 1952, followed by Idaho in 1954, and the NCAA in 1960. Football star Tony Canadeo boxed during his senior year in 1941 at 175 lb (79 kg) and was named team captain.
