= Herbert Hart =

Herbert Hart may refer to:

- H. L. A. Hart (1907–1992), British legal philosopher
- Herbert Hart (cricketer) (1859–1895), English cricketer
- Herbert Hart (general) (1882–1968), New Zealand Military Forces officer
- Herbert L. Hart (1897–1988), American college football player and coach
