= 1939 Gonzaga Bulldogs football team =

American college football season

1939 Gonzaga Bulldogs football
- Conference: Independent
- Record: 6–2
- Head coach: Puggy Hunton (1st season)
- Home stadium: Gonzaga Stadium

1939 Western college football independents records
	Conf.			Overall
Team	W	L	T	W		L		T
San Diego Marines		–		11	–	0	–	0
No. T–14 Santa Clara		–		5	–	1	–	3
Gonzaga		–		6	–	2	–	0
Humboldt State		–		5	–	2	–	0
Idaho Southern Branch		–		5	–	2	–	0
Cal Poly		–		4	–	4	–	1
San Francisco		–		4	–	3	–	3
La Verne		–		3	–	3	–	0
Saint Mary's		–		3	–	4	–	1
Hawaii		–		3	–	6	–	0
Loyola (CA)		–		2	–	6	–	1
San Francisco State		–		2	–	4	–	2
Portland		–		1	–	5	–	1
Rankings from AP Poll

The 1939 Gonzaga Bulldogs football team was an American football team that represented Gonzaga University during the 1939 college football season. In their first year under head coach Puggy Hunton, the Bulldogs compiled a 6–2 record, shut out five of their last six opponents, and outscored all opponents by a total of 100 to 45. Among its victories, Gonzaga defeated two Pacific Coast Conference teams, including an undefeated Oregon team that was ranked No. 11 prior to the game.

The team was led by backfield star Tony Canadeo who later played 11 seasons for the Green Bay Packers and was inducted into the Pro Football Hall of Fame.

Gonzaga was ranked at No. 80 (out of 609 teams) in the final Litkenhous Ratings for 1939.

== Schedule ==
Date	Opponent	Site	Result	Attendance	Source
September 23	at Washington State	Rogers Field; Pullman, WA	L 6–19	5,000	
October 1	at Saint Mary's	Kezar Stadium; San Francisco, CA	L 0–19		
October 7	at Texas Tech	Tech Field; Lubbock, TX	W 6–0	9,000	
October 13	Idaho	Gonzaga Stadium; Spokane, WA (rivalry)	W 19–0		
October 21	at No. 11 Oregon	Hayward Field; Eugene, OR	W 12–7	5,500	
November 11	at Montana	Dornblaser Field; Missoula, MT	W 23–0		
November 18	Eastern Washington	Gonzaga Stadium; Spokane, WA	W 27–0		
November 26	at Portland	Multnomah Stadium; Portland, OR	W 7–0		
Rankings from AP Poll released prior to the game
