= 1939 Idaho Southern Branch Bengals football team =

American college football season

1939 Idaho Southern Branch Bengals football
- Conference: Independent
- Record: 5–2
- Head coach: Guy Wicks (5th season)
- Captain: Woody Lundberg (Note: Lundberg later transferred to Western State College, served in World War II, and became a teacher in Baltimore; he died in 1971 at age 56.)
- Home stadium: Spud Bowl

1939 Western college football independents records
	Conf.			Overall
Team	W	L	T	W		L		T
San Diego Marines		–		11	–	0	–	0
No. T–14 Santa Clara		–		5	–	1	–	3
Gonzaga		–		6	–	2	–	0
Humboldt State		–		5	–	2	–	0
Idaho Southern Branch		–		5	–	2	–	0
Cal Poly		–		4	–	4	–	1
San Francisco		–		4	–	3	–	3
La Verne		–		3	–	3	–	0
Saint Mary's		–		3	–	4	–	1
Hawaii		–		3	–	6	–	0
Loyola (CA)		–		2	–	6	–	1
San Francisco State		–		2	–	4	–	2
Portland		–		1	–	5	–	1
Rankings from AP Poll

The 1939 Idaho Southern Branch Bengals football team was an American football team that represented the University of Idaho, Southern Branch (later renamed Idaho State University) as an independent during the 1939 college football season. In their fifth season under head coach Guy Wicks, the team compiled a 5–2 record (Note: Contemporary newspaper reports for individual games yield a 4–3 record; see the Chaffey College game.) and outscored opponents by a total of 67 to 48.

== Schedule ==
Date	Opponent	Site	Result	Attendance	Source
September 30	Colorado State–Greeley (Note: Colorado State–Greeley is listed in some sources as Northern Colorado, a name adopted in 1970.)	Spud Bowl; Pocatello, ID	L 0–13		
October 14	Compton	Spud Bowl; Pocatello, ID	W 16–0		
October 21	Albion Normal (Note: Albion Normal is listed in some sources as Southern Idaho, a name adopted in 1947.)	Spud Bowl; Pocatello, ID	W 12–6 (Note: The 1940 Wickiup college yearbook listed the Albion score as 13–6.)		
October 28	at Montana State	Gatton Field; Bozeman, MT	L 6–10		
November 11	College of Idaho^{†}	Spud Bowl; Pocatello, ID	W 13–6	3,500	
November 18	Nebraska–Omaha	Spud Bowl; Pocatello, ID	W 6–0		
November 23	at Chaffey	Chaffey Field; Ontario, CA	W 14–13 (Note: Idaho State's football media guide lists the Chaffey College game as a 14–13 win for Idaho Southern Branch, as did the 1940 Wickiup college yearbook (although describing the game as "an anti-climax"). Conversely, contemporary newspapers reported a 14–13 win for Chaffey College, as did the 1940 Argus college yearbook.)		
^{†}Homecoming
