= Herbert L. Hart =

American college football player and coach (1897–1988)

Biographical details
- Born: February 20, 1897; Kitchel, Indiana, U.S.
- Died: May 6, 1988 (aged 91); Napa, California, U.S.

Playing career

Football
- 1916–1917: Purdue

Basketball
- 1915–1917: Purdue
- Positions: Center (football); Guard (basketball)

Coaching career (HC unless noted)

Football
- 1922–1923: Mount Morris
- 1924: Monmouth (IL) (assistant)
- 1925–1929: Monmouth (IL)
- 1932–1937: Monmouth (IL)
- 1938–1940: Humboldt State

Basketball
- 1922–1924: Mount Morris
- 1938–1939: Humboldt State

Administrative career (AD unless noted)
- 1924–1938: Monmouth (IL)
- 1938–1941: Humboldt State

Head coaching record
- Overall: 74–42–11 (football)

Accomplishments and honors

Championships
- Football; 3 IIAC (1925–1926, 1935); 3 MWC (1925, 1932, 1934)

Herbert Lybrook Hart (February 20, 1897 – May 6, 1988) was an American college football and college basketball player and coach and athletics administrator. He served as the head football coach at Mount Morris College from 1922 to 1923, Monmouth College from 1924 to 1928 and 1932 to 1937, and at Humboldt State University from 1938 to 1940.

Hart attended Purdue University, where he played football and basketball and ran track. He later earned a master's degree from the University of Chicago. Hart died on May 6, 1988, at Napa Nursing Center in Napa, California.

== Head coaching record ==
=== Football ===
Year	Team	Overall	Conference	Standing	Bowl/playoffs
Mount Morris Mounders (Illinois Intercollegiate Athletic Conference) (1922–1923)
1922	Mount Morris	3–3	1–1	T–9th	
1923	Mount Morris	2–1–2	2–0–1	2nd	
Mount Morris:		5–4–2	3–1–1		
Monmouth Fighting Scots (Illinois Intercollegiate Athletic Conference / Midwest Conference) (1925–1929)
1925	Monmouth	7–0–2	6–0–1 / 1–0–1	T–1st / T–1st	
1926	Monmouth	7–1	5–0 / 2–1	T–1st / 3rd	
1927	Monmouth	4–4	3–1 / 1–3	T–3rd / 8th	
1928	Monmouth	6–3	5–1 / 2–1	5th / T–3rd	
1929	Monmouth	5–4	5–1 / 0–2	T–3rd / T–7th	
Monmouth Fighting Scots (Illinois Intercollegiate Athletic Conference / Midwest Conference) (1932–1937)
1932	Monmouth	4–3–2	2–2–1 / 2–0–1	T–10th / T–1st	
1933	Monmouth	4–5	2–3 / 0–2	14th / T–6th	
1934	Monmouth	6–2–1	2–2 / 4–0–1	T–10th / T–1st	
1935	Monmouth	6–3	4–0 / 2–3	T–1st / 7th	
1936	Monmouth	4–4	2–2 / 1–3	T–10th / 7th	
1937	Monmouth	4–1–4	1–0–3 / 2–1–2	5th / 2nd	
Monmouth:		57–30–9			
Humboldt State Lumberjacks (Independent) (1938–1940)
1938	Humboldt State	4–2			
1939	Humboldt State	5–2			
1937	Humboldt State	3–4			
Humboldt State:		12–8			
Total:		74–42–11			
National championship Conference title Conference division title or championship game berth
