= 1939 Chico State Wildcats football team =

American college football season

1939 Chico State Wildcats football
- Conference: Far Western Conference
- Record: 2–3–2 (1–2 FWC)
- Head coach: Hubert J. McCormick (1st season)
- Home stadium: College Field

1939 Far Western Conference football standings
	Conf.					Overall
Team	W		L		T	W		L		T
Fresno State	2	–	0	–	0	10	–	1	–	1
Nevada $	3	–	1	–	0	5	–	4	–	0
Pacific (CA)	2	–	2	–	0	6	–	6	–	1
Chico State	1	–	2	–	0	2	–	4	–	2
Cal Aggies	0	–	3	–	0	4	–	4	–	0
$ – Conference champion; Fresno State was ineligible for the conference championship because they only played two league games.

The 1939 Chico State Wildcats football team represented Chico State College—now known as California State University, Chico—as a member of the Far Western Conference (FWC) during the 1939 college football season. Led by Hubert J. McCormick in his first and only season as head coach, Chico State compiled an overall record of 2–3–2 with a mark of 1–2 in conference play, placing fourth in the FWC. The team was outscored by its opponents 47 to 28 for the season.

Chico State was ranked at No. 332 (out of 609 teams) in the final Litkenhous Ratings for 1939.

The Wildcats played home games at College Field in Chico, California.

== Schedule ==
Date	Opponent	Site	Result	Source
October 7	Sacramento*	College Field; Chico, CA	T 0–0	
October 14	at San Francisco State*	Roberts Field; San Francisco, CA	T 0–0	
October 28	at Humboldt State*	Albee Stadium; Eureka, CA	L 0–6	
November 4	Nevada	College Field; Chico, CA	L 0–3	
November 18	at Cal Aggies	A Street field; Davis, CA	W 9–7	
November 23	Pacific (CA)	College Field; Chico, CA	L 6–31	
November 30	Cal Poly*	College Field; Chico, CA	W 13–0	
*Non-conference game
