= 1939 San Francisco State Staters football team =

American college football season

1939 San Francisco State Staters football
- Conference: Independent
- Record: 2–4–2
- Head coach: Dick Boyle (1st season)
- Home stadium: Roberts Field

1939 Western college football independents records
	Conf.			Overall
Team	W	L	T	W		L		T
San Diego Marines		–		11	–	0	–	0
No. T–14 Santa Clara		–		5	–	1	–	3
Gonzaga		–		6	–	2	–	0
Humboldt State		–		5	–	2	–	0
Idaho Southern Branch		–		5	–	2	–	0
Cal Poly		–		4	–	4	–	1
San Francisco		–		4	–	3	–	3
La Verne		–		3	–	3	–	0
Saint Mary's		–		3	–	4	–	1
Hawaii		–		3	–	6	–	0
Loyola (CA)		–		2	–	6	–	1
San Francisco State		–		2	–	4	–	2
Portland		–		1	–	5	–	1
Rankings from AP Poll

The 1939 San Francisco State States football team represented San Francisco State College—now known as San Francisco State University—as an independent during the 1939 college football season. Led by first-year head coach Dick Boyle, San Francisco State compiled a record of 2–4–2 and was outscored by its opponents 70 to 59. The team played home games at Roberts Field in San Francisco. Although the "Gator" was voted to be the mascot for the team in 1931, local newspaper articles called the team the "Staters" from 1935 through 1940.

== Schedule ==
Date	Opponent	Site	Result	Attendance	Source
September 15	at Marin	Kentfield, CA	W 26–0		
September 22	at Nevada	Mackay Stadium (Note: This stadium is the predecessor to the current Mackay Stadium, which was opened for the 1966 season.); Reno, NV	L 6–13		
September 29	San Mateo	Roberts Field; San Francisco, CA	W 18–12		
October 6	Cal Aggies	Roberts Field; San Francisco, CA	L 0–7	5,500	
October 13	Chico State	Roberts Field; San Francisco, CA	T 0–0		
October 21	at Humboldt State	Albee Stadium; Eureka, CA	L 9–19		
October 28	at Cal Poly	Mustang Stadium; San Luis Obispo, CA	T 0–0	2,000	
November 3	at San Francisco Junior College	Seals Stadium; San Francisco, CA	L 0–19		
