= 1939 San Diego Marines Devil Dogs football team =

American college football season

1939 San Diego Marines Devil Dogs football
- Conference: Independent
- Record: 11–0
- Head coach: Elmer Hall (1st season)

1939 Western college football independents records
| | Conf. | | | Overall |
| Team | W | L | T | W | | L | | T |
|---|---|---|---|---|---|---|---|---|
| San Diego Marines | | – | | 11 | – | 0 | – | 0 |
| No. T–14 Santa Clara | | – | | 5 | – | 1 | – | 3 |
| Gonzaga | | – | | 6 | – | 2 | – | 0 |
| Humboldt State | | – | | 5 | – | 2 | – | 0 |
| Idaho Southern Branch | | – | | 5 | – | 2 | – | 0 |
| Cal Poly | | – | | 4 | – | 4 | – | 1 |
| San Francisco | | – | | 4 | – | 3 | – | 3 |
| La Verne | | – | | 3 | – | 3 | – | 0 |
| Saint Mary's | | – | | 3 | – | 4 | – | 1 |
| Hawaii | | – | | 3 | – | 6 | – | 0 |
| Loyola (CA) | | – | | 2 | – | 6 | – | 1 |
| San Francisco State | | – | | 2 | – | 4 | – | 2 |
| Portland | | – | | 1 | – | 5 | – | 1 |
Rankings from AP Poll

The 1939 San Diego Marine Devil Dogs football team represented the United States Marines Corps Recruit Depot in San Diego as an independent during the 1939 college football season. Playing against college football teams from California, Oregon, and Arizona, the Devil Dogs compiled a perfect 11–0 record, shut out five of eleven opponents, and outscored all opponents by a total of 241 to 51. Major Elmer Hall, who had previously played college football for Oregon, was the team's coach. The Marines challenged the Army and Navy service academy teams to a post-season match, but neither academy accepted the challenge.

The San Diego Marines were ranked at No. 96 (out of 609 teams) in the final Litkenhous Ratings for 1939.

== Schedule ==
| Date | Opponent | Site | Result | Attendance | Source |
|---|---|---|---|---|---|
| September 17 | Western Bears | San Diego, CA | W 41–0 | | |
| September 23 | Willamette | San Diego, CA | W 26–0 | 5,000 | |
| October 6 | Caltech | San Diego, CA | W 21–6 | | |
| October 14 | at Santa Barbara State | La Playa Stadium; Santa Barbara, CA | W 7–0 | | |
| October 21 | Redlands | Balboa Stadium; San Diego, CA | W 15–14 | 3,500 | |
| October 27 | Occidental | San Diego, CA | W 33–6 | | |
| November 3 | Pomona | Balboa Bowl; San Diego, CA | W 33–12 | | |
| November 11 | San Diego State | San Diego, CA | W 13–6 | 8,000 | |
| November 17 | Cal Poly | San Diego, CA | W 20–7 | | |
| November 23 | Arizona State | San Diego, CA | W 18–0 | 6,000 | |
| December 7 | Pacific (CA) | San Diego, CA | W 14–0 | 12,000 | |

== Players ==
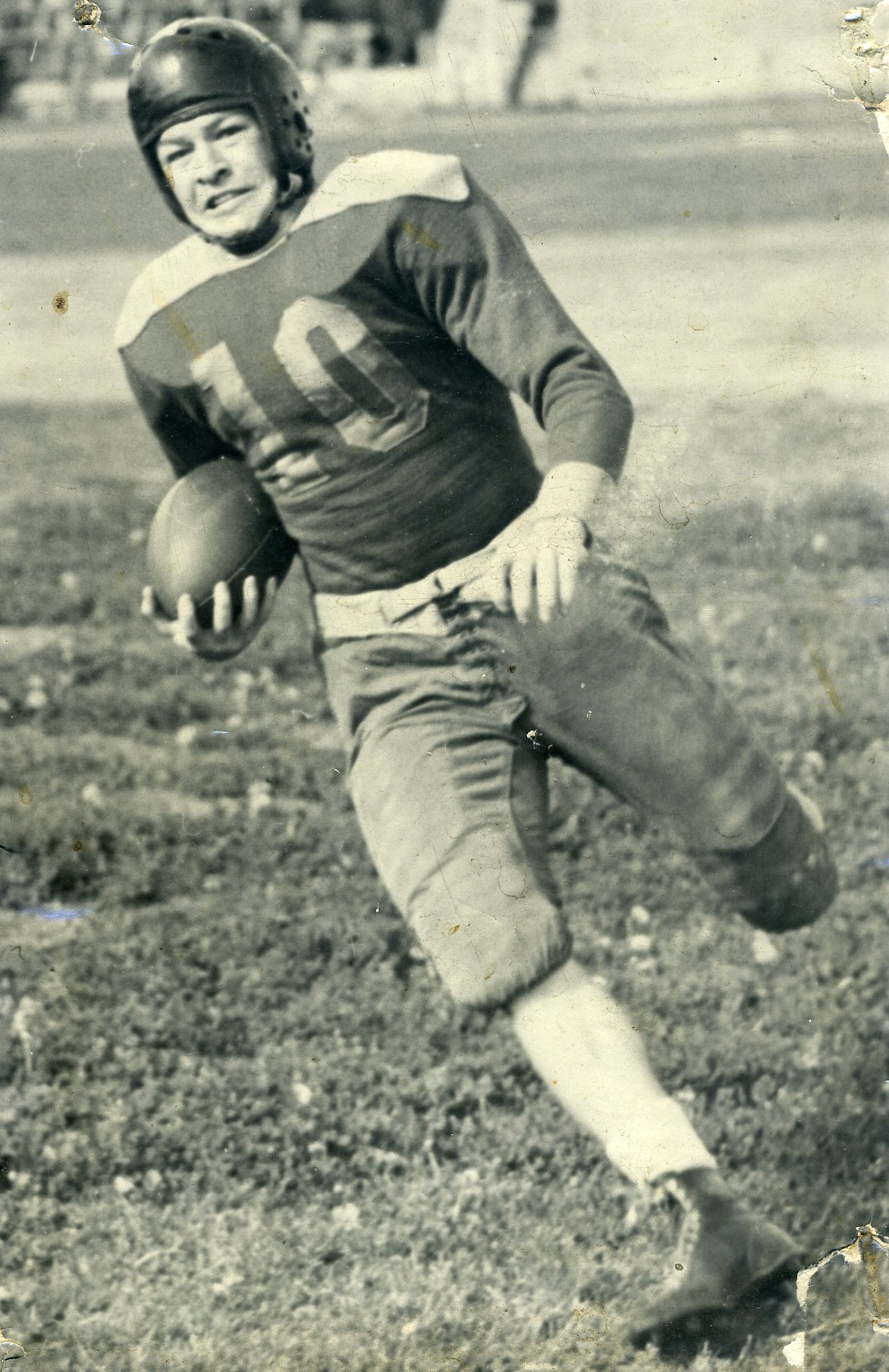
Jack Rawls

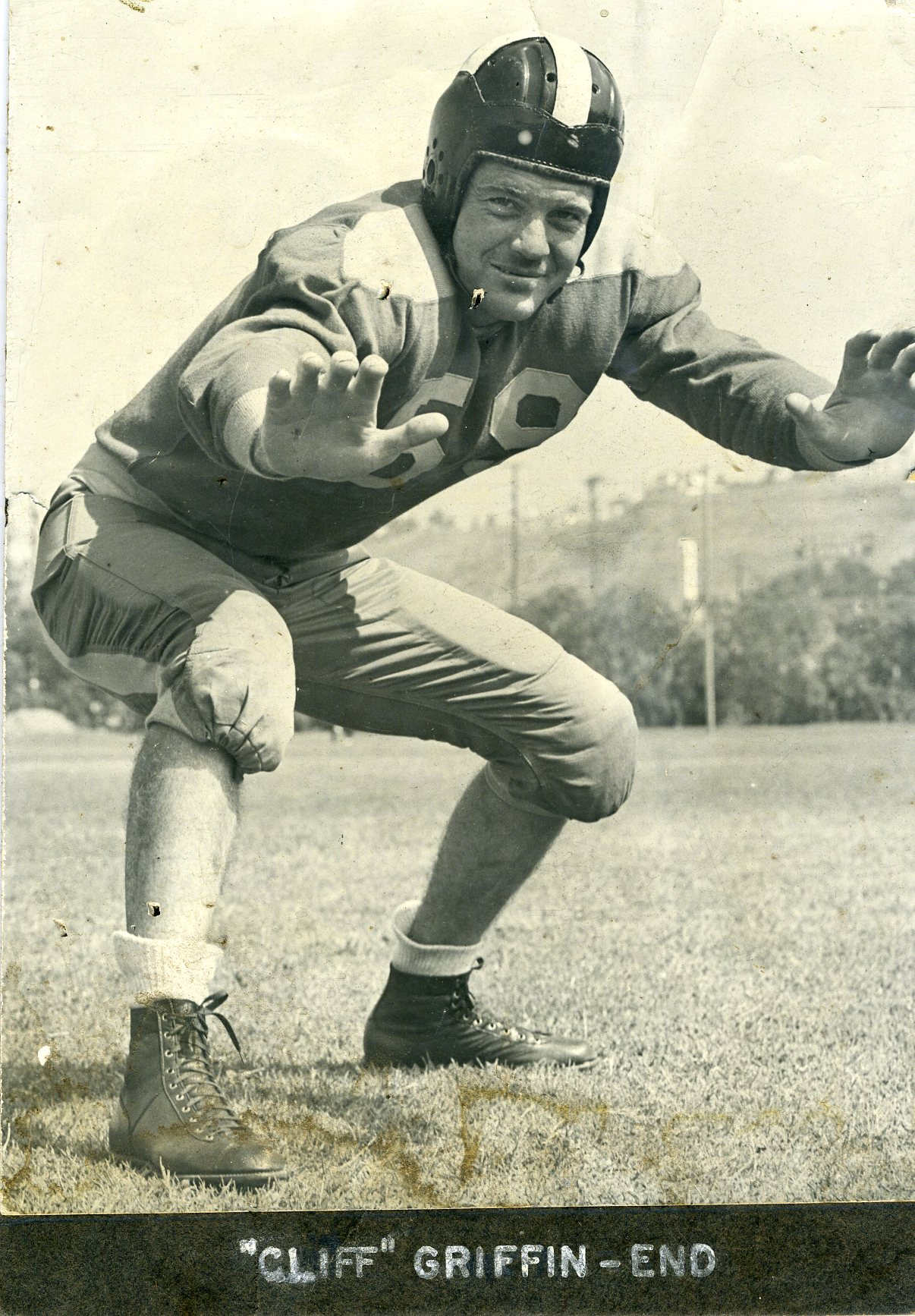
Clifford Griffin

The 1939 San Diego Marines football team included the following players:

- Arne Arneson, quarterback, 175 pounds
- Max Cowsert, guard, 190 pounds
- Bill Crass, fullback, 200 pounds
- Clifford Griffin, end, 202 pounds
- Clarence Klinck, center, 180 pounds
- Felix Krause, tackle, 195 pounds
- Alfred Montrief, end, 187 pounds
- Rivers Morrell, guard, 185 pounds
- Jack "Jittery Jackie" Rawls, halfback, 145 pounds
- Max Tafoya, halfback, 165 pounds
