= 1939 Loyola Lions football team =

American college football season

1939 Loyola Lions football
- Conference: Independent
- Record: 2–6–1
- Head coach: Mike Pecarovich (2nd season)
- Home stadium: Gilmore Stadium; Los Angeles Memorial Coliseum

1939 Western college football independents records
	Conf.			Overall
Team	W	L	T	W		L		T
San Diego Marines		–		11	–	0	–	0
No. T–14 Santa Clara		–		5	–	1	–	3
Gonzaga		–		6	–	2	–	0
Humboldt State		–		5	–	2	–	0
Idaho Southern Branch		–		5	–	2	–	0
Cal Poly		–		4	–	4	–	1
San Francisco		–		4	–	3	–	3
La Verne		–		3	–	3	–	0
Saint Mary's		–		3	–	4	–	1
Hawaii		–		3	–	6	–	0
Loyola (CA)		–		2	–	6	–	1
San Francisco State		–		2	–	4	–	2
Portland		–		1	–	5	–	1
Rankings from AP Poll

The 1939 Loyola Lions football team was an American football team that represented Loyola University of Los Angeles (now known as Loyola Marymount University) as an independent during the 1939 college football season. In their second non-consecutive season under head coach Mike Pecarovich, the Lions compiled a 2–6–1 record.

== Schedule ==
Date	Opponent	Site	Result	Attendance	Source
September 22	Redlands	Gilmore Stadium; Los Angeles, CA	W 6–0	10,000	
September 27	Whittier	Gilmore Stadium; Los Angeles, CA	L 13–19	< 9,000	
October 6	Pacific (CA)	Gilmore Stadium; Los Angeles, CA	T 13–13	10,000	
October 28	Hardin–Simmons	Gilmore Stadium; Los Angeles, CA	W 6–0	15,000	
November 5	San Francisco	Gilmore Stadium; Los Angeles, CA	L 7–14	12,000	
November 17	San Jose State	Gilmore Stadium; Los Angeles, CA	L 0–10	17,000	
November 26	Santa Clara	Gilmore Stadium; Los Angeles, CA	L 0–41	10,000	
December 3	Saint Mary's	Los Angeles Memorial Coliseum; Los Angeles, CA	L 7–40		
December 9	vs. Arizona	Phoenix Union High School Stadium; Phoenix, AZ	L 7–25	10,000	
