= 1939 Nevada Wolf Pack football team =

American college football season

1939 Nevada Wolf Pack football

FWC champion
- Conference: Far Western Conference
- Record: 5–4 (3–1 FWC)
- Head coach: Jim Aiken (1st season)
- Home stadium: Mackay Field

1939 Far Western Conference football standings
	Conf.					Overall
Team	W		L		T	W		L		T
Fresno State	2	–	0	–	0	10	–	1	–	1
Nevada $	3	–	1	–	0	5	–	4	–	0
Pacific (CA)	2	–	2	–	0	6	–	6	–	1
Chico State	1	–	2	–	0	2	–	4	–	2
Cal Aggies	0	–	3	–	0	4	–	4	–	0
$ – Conference champion; Fresno State was ineligible for the conference championship because they only played two league games.

The 1939 Nevada Wolf Pack football team was an American football team that represented the University of Nevada in the Far Western Conference (FWC) during the 1939 college football season. In their first season under head coach Jim Aiken, the team compiled a 5–4 record (3–1 against conference opponents) and won the conference championship.

Nevada was ranked at No. 253 (out of 609 teams) in the final Litkenhous Ratings for 1939.

This was the Wolf Pack's last year as a member of the FWC as they went independent for the 1940 season.

== Schedule ==
Date	Opponent	Site	Result	Attendance	Source
September 22	San Francisco State*	Mackay Field; Reno, NV	W 13–6		
September 30	at Arizona State–Flagstaff*	Skidmore Field; Flagstaff, AZ	L 7–9		
October 7	at San Jose State*	Spartan Stadium; San Jose, CA	L 0–28		
October 14	at Fresno State	Fresno State College Stadium; Fresno, CA	L 0–45	9,533	
October 21	BYU*^{†}	Mackay Field; Reno, NV	L 0–7	5,000	
October 28	Cal Aggies	Mackay Field; Reno, NV	W 3–0		
November 4	at Chico State	College Field; Chico, CA	W 3–0		
November 11	Colorado State–Greeley*	Mackay Field; Reno, NV	W 15–6		
December 2	at Pacific (CA)	Baxter Stadium; Stockton, CA	W 8–0		
*Non-conference game; ^{†}Homecoming
