= 1939 Portland Pilots football team =

American college football season

1939 Portland Pilots football
- Conference: Independent
- Record: 1–5–1
- Head coach: Robert L. Mathews (3rd season)
- Home stadium: Multnomah Stadium

1939 Western college football independents records
	Conf.			Overall
Team	W	L	T	W		L		T
San Diego Marines		–		11	–	0	–	0
No. T–14 Santa Clara		–		5	–	1	–	3
Gonzaga		–		6	–	2	–	0
Humboldt State		–		5	–	2	–	0
Idaho Southern Branch		–		5	–	2	–	0
Cal Poly		–		4	–	4	–	1
San Francisco		–		4	–	3	–	3
La Verne		–		3	–	3	–	0
Saint Mary's		–		3	–	4	–	1
Hawaii		–		3	–	6	–	0
Loyola (CA)		–		2	–	6	–	1
San Francisco State		–		2	–	4	–	2
Portland		–		1	–	5	–	1
Rankings from AP Poll

The 1939 Portland Pilots football team was an American football team that represented the University of Portland as an independent during the 1939 college football season. In its third year under head coach Robert L. Mathews, the team compiled a 1–5–1 record. The team played its home games at Multnomah Stadium in Portland, Oregon.

== Schedule ==
Date	Opponent	Site	Result	Attendance	Source
September 23	Montana State	Multnomah Stadium; Portland, OR	L 6–14	4,500	
September 30	at Montana	Dornblaser Field; Missoula, MT	L 0–9	4,500	
October 6	at Willamette	Sweetland Field; Salem, OR	T 0–0		
October 14	Oregon State	Multnomah Stadium; Portland, OR	L 12–14		
October 29	at Saint Mary's	Kezar Stadium; San Francisco, CA	W 14–12	2,500	
November 11	at Fresno State	Fresno State College Stadium; Fresno, CA	L 13–27	9,310	
November 26	Gonzaga	Multnomah Stadium; Portland, OR	L 0–7		
