= 1939 Fresno State Bulldogs football team =

American college football season

1939 Fresno State Bulldogs football
- Conference: California Collegiate Athletic Association, Far Western Conference
- Record: 10–1 (1–1 CCAA, 2–0 FWC)
- Head coach: James Bradshaw (4th season)
- Home stadium: Fresno State College Stadium

1939 California Collegiate Athletic Association football standings
	Conf.					Overall
Team	W		L		T	W		L		T
San Jose State $	3	–	0	–	0	13	–	0	–	0
Fresno State	1	–	1	–	0	10	–	1	–	0
Santa Barbara State	1	–	2	–	0	5	–	4	–	1
San Diego State	0	–	2	–	0	2	–	7	–	0
$ – Conference champion

1939 Far Western Conference football standings
	Conf.					Overall
Team	W		L		T	W		L		T
Fresno State	2	–	0	–	0	10	–	1	–	1
Nevada $	3	–	1	–	0	5	–	4	–	0
Pacific (CA)	2	–	2	–	0	6	–	6	–	1
Chico State	1	–	2	–	0	2	–	4	–	2
Cal Aggies	0	–	3	–	0	4	–	4	–	0
$ – Conference champion; Fresno State was ineligible for the conference championship because they only played two league games.

The 1939 Fresno State Bulldogs football team represented Fresno State Normal School—now known as California State University, Fresno—as a member of the California Collegiate Athletic Association (CCAA) and Far Western Conference (FWC) during the 1939 college football season. Led by fourth-year head coach James Bradshaw, Fresno State compiled an overall record of 10–1 with a mark of 1–1 in CCAA, playing second behind conference champion San Jose State. The Bulldogs were also 2–0 in FWC play, but did not play enough league game to qualify for the conference title. Fresno State outscored its opponents 244 to 98 for the season.

Fresno State was ranked at No. 59 (out of 609 teams) in the final Litkenhous Ratings for 1939.

The team played home games at Fresno State College Stadium on the campus of Fresno City College in Fresno, California.

== Schedule ==
Date	Opponent	Site	Result	Attendance	Source
September 30	Texas Mines*	Fresno State College Stadium; Fresno, CA	W 10–7	8,597–9,000	
October 6	at Santa Barbara State	La Playa Stadium; Santa Barbara, CA	W 13–6		
October 14	Nevada	Fresno State College Stadium; Fresno, CA	W 45–0	9,533	
October 21	California JV*	Fresno State College Stadium; Fresno, CA	W 28–7	5,044	
October 28	San Francisco*	Fresno State College Stadium; Fresno, CA	W 21–2	8,506	
November 4	Pacific (CA)	Fresno State College Stadium; Fresno, CA	W 7–0	11,227	
November 11	Portland*	Fresno State College Stadium; Fresno, CA	W 27–13	9,310	
November 17	at Whittier*	Hadley Field; Whittier, CA	W 27–13		
November 23	at San Jose State	Spartan Stadium; San Jose, CA (rivalry)	L 7–42	11,311	
December 2	at Hawaii*	Honolulu Stadium; Honolulu, HI (rivalry)	W 38–2	22,000	
December 6	at Healani Athletic Club (HI)*	Honolulu Stadium; Honolulu, HI	W 21–6		
*Non-conference game
