= Robert L. Mathews =

American college football coach (1887-1947)

- The Archive 1928, Saint Louis yearbook

Biographical details
- Born: August 6, 1887; Leadville, Colorado, U.S.
- Died: September 1, 1947 (aged 60); Portland, Oregon, U.S.

Playing career

Football
- 1907: Willamette
- 1908–1910: Notre Dame
- Position: Back

Coaching career (HC unless noted)

Football
- 1911: St. Edward's
- 1912–1914: Kenyon
- 1915–1920: Willamette
- 1921: Washington (freshmen)
- 1922–1925: Idaho
- 1926–1927: Saint Louis
- 1929: Gonzaga
- 1931–1932: West Seattle Athletic Club
- 1937–1942: Portland
- 1944: Portland Rockets
- 1946: Lewis & Clark

Basketball
- 1929–1930: Gonzaga
- 1942–1943: Portland
- 1945–1946: Lewis & Clark

Baseball
- 1922: Washington
- 1942: Portland

Administrative career (AD unless noted)
- 1915–1921: Willamette
- 1922–1926: Idaho
- 1929–1930: Gonzaga
- 1937–1944: Portland

Head coaching record
- Overall: 3–6 (AFL); 8–8 (college basketball)

Accomplishments and honors

Championships
- Football; 1 Northwest Conference (1924)

Robert Lee "Matty" Mathews (August 6, 1887 – September 1, 1947) was an American football player and coach. He was the head football coach at St. Edward's College (1911), Kenyon College (1912–1914), Willamette University (1915–1920), the University of Idaho (1922–1925), Saint Louis University (1926–1927), Gonzaga University (1929), the University of Portland (1937–1942), and Lewis & Clark College (1945–1946).

== Biography ==
He was born on August 6, 1887, in Leadville, Colorado.

Mathews played college football at Willamette University in Salem, Oregon, as a freshman then transferred to the University of Notre Dame in 1908 and played three seasons for the Fighting Irish in South Bend, Indiana. During his senior season in 1910, future coaching legend Knute Rockne was a freshman end.

In Mathews' four seasons at Idaho, the Vandals' first years in the Pacific Coast Conference, they won three consecutive rivalry games over Palouse neighbor Washington State. Idaho lost the other, Mathews' first in 1922, by a single point, and he remains the only Idaho head coach with multiple wins over WSU. The Vandals made significant use of the forward pass under Mathews, who was also the athletic director at Idaho.

He left Moscow and the Northwest after 1925 for St. Louis for two seasons (1926–27) but did not coach during the 1928 season, and worked in private business in Akron, Ohio, until hired at Gonzaga in June 1929. After less than a year in Spokane as athletic director and head coach in football and basketball, he resigned in April 1930 to pursue career options closer to the coast.

Mathews was also the head coach of the West Seattle Athletic Club in 1931 and 1932 and of the American Football League's Portland Rockets in 1944. In the 1930s, he supervised athletics for the Civilian Conservation Corps (CCC) camps in the state of Washington.

He returned to college football in Oregon at the University of Portland in 1937, where he was also athletic director. During World War II, the school dropped football prior to the 1943 season and Mathews resigned as AD the following spring when the administration extended the hiatus for the 1944 season. Entering his third season at Lewis & Clark in 1947,

Mathews died on September 1 at the age of 60 of a heart attack at his home in Portland, Oregon.

== Head coaching record ==
=== College football ===
Year	Team	Overall	Conference	Standing	Bowl/playoffs
St. Edward's Saints (1911)
1911	St. Edward's				
St. Edward's:					
Kenyon Lords (Ohio Athletic Conference) (1912–1914)
1912	Kenyon	4–3–1	2–3–1	T–7th	
1913	Kenyon	5–3–1	1–3–1	T–8th	
1914	Kenyon	4–3–1	2–3	7th	
Kenyon:		13–9–3	5–9–2		
Willamette Methodists/Bearcats (1915–1920)
1915	Willamette	2–2–1			
1916	Willamette	4–2			
1917	Willamette	1–1			
1918	No team—World War I				
1919	Willamette	4–1			
1920	Willamette	3–1–1			
Willamette:		14–7–2			
Idaho Vandals (Northwest Conference / Pacific Coast Conference) (1922–1925)
1922	Idaho	3–5	2–3 / 0–4	4th / 8th	
1923	Idaho	5–2–1	3–0–1 / 2–2–1	2nd / T–3rd	
1924	Idaho	5–2–1	4–0–1 / 4–2	T–1st / 4th	
1925	Idaho	3–5	2–3 / 2–3	T–4th / T–6th	
Idaho:		16–14–2	11–12–2		
Saint Louis Billikens (Independent) (1926–1927)
1926	Saint Louis	3–6			
1927	Saint Louis	5–5			
Saint Louis:		8–11			
Gonzaga Bulldogs (Independent) (1929)
1929	Gonzaga	4–3			
Gonzaga:		4–3			
Portland Pilots (Independent) (1937–1942)
1937	Portland	4–3–1			
1938	Portland	5–3			
1939	Portland	1–5–1			
1940	Portland	2–3–1			
1941	Portland	3–5			
1942	Portland	5–2			
Portland:		20–21–3			
Lewis & Clark Pioneers (Independent) (1946)
1946	Lewis & Clark	3–4–1			
Lewis & Clark:		3–4–1			
Total:					
