= 1939 San Jose State Spartans football team =

American college football season

1939 San Jose State Spartans football

CCAA champion
- Conference: California Collegiate Athletic Association
- Record: 13–0 (3–0 CCAA)
- Head coach: Dudley DeGroot (8th season)
- Home stadium: Spartan Stadium

1939 California Collegiate Athletic Association football standings
	Conf.					Overall
Team	W		L		T	W		L		T
San Jose State $	3	–	0	–	0	13	–	0	–	0
Fresno State	1	–	1	–	0	10	–	1	–	0
Santa Barbara State	1	–	2	–	0	5	–	4	–	1
San Diego State	0	–	2	–	0	2	–	7	–	0
$ – Conference champion

The 1939 San Jose State Spartans football team represented San Jose State College (Note: San Jose State University was known as San Jose State College from 1935 to 1971.) during the 1939 college football season.

San Jose State competed in the inaugural year of the California Collegiate Athletic Association (CCAA). The team was classified as an independent for the previous four seasons (1935–1938). The Spartans were led by head coach Dudley DeGroot, in his eighth year, and played home games at Spartan Stadium in San Jose, California.

The Spartans finished the season as undefeated CCAA champions with a final record of thirteen wins and no losses (13–0, 3-0 CCAA). The Spartans dominated their opponents, scoring 324 points for the season while giving up only 29, for an average score of 24–2. Only four opposing teams scored against the Spartans, never more than seven points, and eight teams were shut out.

The Spartans spent two weeks in the Associated Press poll in 1939. They were ranked No. 19 in week 7 and No. 18 in week 8. It was not ranked in the final AP poll, but it was ranked at No. 43 in the 1939 Williamson System ratings. and at No. 37 in the final Litkenhous Ratings.

Famed football coach Pop Warner was an advisory coach for the Spartans in 1939 and 1940, helping the team to a 24–1 record over the two seasons. The October 20th game vs. College of the Pacific marked the first time Warner had coached against Amos Alonzo Stagg since the two coaches had met in 1907, when Warner was coaching Carlisle and defeated Stagg's University of Chicago.

== Schedule ==
Date	Opponent	Site	Result	Attendance	Source
September 15	Montana State*	Spartan Stadium; San Jose, CA	W 35–0	5,000	
September 18	Texas A&I*	Spartan Stadium; San Jose, CA	W 9–0	7,500	
September 23	at San Francisco*	Kezar Stadium; San Francisco, CA	W 16–6	< 3,000	
October 1	California JV*	Spartan Stadium; San Jose, CA	W 27–0		
October 7	Nevada*	Spartan Stadium; San Jose, CA	W 28–0		
October 13	San Diego State	Spartan Stadium; San Jose, CA	W 42–0	8,000	
October 20	at Pacific (CA)*	Baxter Stadium; Stockton, CA (rivalry)	W 13–3	15,000	
October 27	at Santa Barbara State	La Playa Stadium; Santa Barbara, CA	W 23–7		
November 3	at Willamette*	Sweetland Field; Salem, OR	W 15–0	3,500	
November 10	Redlands*	Spartan Stadium; San Jose, CA	W 52–6		
November 17	at Loyola (CA)*	Gilmore Stadium; Los Angeles, CA	W 10–0	17,000	
November 24	Fresno State	Spartan Stadium; San Jose, CA (rivary)	W 42–7	11,311	
November 30	Drake*	Spartan Stadium; San Jose, CA	W 12–0	13,000	
*Non-conference game

== Team players in the NFL ==
The following San Jose State players were selected in the 1940 NFL draft.

Player	Position	Round	Overall	NFL team
Roy Zimmerman	Quarterback – Wing Back – Kicker	7	58	Washington Redskins

The following player ended his San Jose State career in 1939, was not drafted, but played in the NFL.

Player	Position	NFL team
Bob Titchenal (Note: Bob Titchenal would later become head coach of the San Jose State Spartans football team, coaching from 1957 to 1964)	End – Center – Linebacker – Defensive end	1940 Washington Redskins
