= 1939 Santa Clara Broncos football team =

American college football season

1939 Santa Clara Broncos football
- Conference: Independent

Ranking
- AP: No. 14
- Record: 5–1–3
- Head coach: Buck Shaw (4th season)
- Home stadium: Kezar Stadium, Seals Stadium

1939 Western college football independents records
	Conf.			Overall
Team	W	L	T	W		L		T
San Diego Marines		–		11	–	0	–	0
No. T–14 Santa Clara		–		5	–	1	–	3
Gonzaga		–		6	–	2	–	0
Humboldt State		–		5	–	2	–	0
Idaho Southern Branch		–		5	–	2	–	0
Cal Poly		–		4	–	4	–	1
San Francisco		–		4	–	3	–	3
La Verne		–		3	–	3	–	0
Saint Mary's		–		3	–	4	–	1
Hawaii		–		3	–	6	–	0
Loyola (CA)		–		2	–	6	–	1
San Francisco State		–		2	–	4	–	2
Portland		–		1	–	5	–	1
Rankings from AP Poll

The 1939 Santa Clara Broncos football team represented Santa Clara University as an independent during the 1939 college football season. In their fourth season under head coach Buck Shaw, the Broncos compiled a 5–1–3 record, outscored opponents by a total of 117 to 40, and were ranked No. 14 in the final AP poll. They ranked at No. 25 in the final Litkenhous Ratings.

After going winless in its first three games (one loss and two ties), the team went undefeated in the final six games, including victories over Purdue, Stanford, and Michigan State, and a scoreless tie with No. 11 UCLA.

Santa Clara center John Schiechl was a consensus pick on the 1939 College Football All-America Team. End Bill Anahu was named to the second team by the International News Service. Schiechl and Anahu were also both first-team picks on the 1939 All-Pacific Coast football team.

== Schedule ==
Date	Opponent	Rank	Site	Result	Attendance	Source
September 30	at Utah		Ute Stadium; Salt Lake City, UT	T 7–7	15,500–17,000	
October 6	Texas A&M		Seals Stadium; San Francisco, CA	L 3–7	16,000	
October 15	at San Francisco		San Francisco, CA	T 13–13	18,000	
October 22	Saint Mary's		Kezar Stadium; San Francisco, CA	W 7–0	45,000	
October 28	Purdue		Kezar Stadium; San Francisco, CA	W 13–6	20,000	
November 4	at Stanford		Stanford Stadium; Stanford, CA	W 27–7	40,000	
November 11	Michigan State	No. 16	Kezar Stadium; San Francisco, CA	W 6–0	18,000	
November 18	at No. 11 UCLA	No. 14	Los Angeles Memorial Coliseum; Los Angeles, CA	T 0–0	50,000	
November 26	at Loyola	No. 17	Gilmore Stadium; Los Angeles, CA	W 41–0	10,000	
Rankings from AP Poll released prior to the game

== After the season ==
=== NFL draft ===
The following Broncos were selected in the 1940 NFL draft following the season.

Round	Pick	Player	Position	NFL team
2	13	John Schiechl	Center	Philadelphia Eagles
8	65	Bob Anahu	End	Cleveland Rams
10	81	Jack Roche	Back	Chicago Cardinals
14	122	Nick Stublar	Tackle	Pittsburgh Steelers
15	133	Ray McCarthy	Back	Pittsburgh Steelers
