= 1939 Cal Poly Mustangs football team =

American college football season

1939 Cal Poly Mustangs football
- Conference: Independent
- Record: 4–4–1
- Head coach: Howie O'Daniels (7th season)
- Home stadium: Mustang Stadium

1939 Western college football independents records
	Conf.			Overall
Team	W	L	T	W		L		T
San Diego Marines		–		11	–	0	–	0
No. T–14 Santa Clara		–		5	–	1	–	3
Gonzaga		–		6	–	2	–	0
Humboldt State		–		5	–	2	–	0
Idaho Southern Branch		–		5	–	2	–	0
Cal Poly		–		4	–	4	–	1
San Francisco		–		4	–	3	–	3
La Verne		–		3	–	3	–	0
Saint Mary's		–		3	–	4	–	1
Hawaii		–		3	–	6	–	0
Loyola (CA)		–		2	–	6	–	1
San Francisco State		–		2	–	4	–	2
Portland		–		1	–	5	–	1
Rankings from AP Poll

The 1939 Cal Poly Mustangs football team represented California Polytechnic School—now known as California Polytechnic State University, San Luis Obispo—as an independent during the 1939 college football season. Led by seventh-year head coach Howie O'Daniels, Cal Poly compiled a record of 4–4–1. The team was outscored by its opponents 101 to 78 for the season. The Mustangs played home games at Mustang Stadium in San Luis Obispo, California.

Cal Poly was a two-year school until 1941 and competed as an independent from 1929 to 1945.

== Schedule ==
Date	Opponent	Site	Result	Attendance	Source
September 22	Caltech	Mustang Stadium; San Luis Obispo, CA	L 7–12		
September 30	at Humboldt State	Albee Stadium; Eureka, CA	L 9–13		
October 7	at Arizona State	Goodwin Stadium; Tempe, AZ	L 0–35		
October 20	at Ventura	Ventura, CA	W 13–0		
October 28	San Francisco State	Mustang Stadium; San Luis Obispo, CA	T 0–0		
November 4	at Cal Aggies	A Street field; Davis, CA	L 0–28	1,500	
November 11	San Francisco freshmen	Mustang Stadium; San Luis Obispo, CA	W 16–6		
November 17	at San Diego Marines (Note: The Marine Corps Recruit Depot (MCRD) in San Diego fielded a team that played against colleges and other military teams from 1922 to 1964.)	Balboa Stadium?; San Diego, CA	W 20–7		
November 30	at Chico State	College Field; Chico, CA	W 13–0		
