= 1939 Saint Mary's Gaels football team =

American college football season

1939 Saint Mary's Gaels football
- Conference: Independent
- Record: 3–4–1
- Head coach: Slip Madigan (19th season)
- Home stadium: Kezar Stadium

1939 Western college football independents records
	Conf.			Overall
Team	W	L	T	W		L		T
San Diego Marines		–		11	–	0	–	0
No. T–14 Santa Clara		–		5	–	1	–	3
Gonzaga		–		6	–	2	–	0
Humboldt State		–		5	–	2	–	0
Idaho Southern Branch		–		5	–	2	–	0
Cal Poly		–		4	–	4	–	1
San Francisco		–		4	–	3	–	3
La Verne		–		3	–	3	–	0
Saint Mary's		–		3	–	4	–	1
Hawaii		–		3	–	6	–	0
Loyola (CA)		–		2	–	6	–	1
San Francisco State		–		2	–	4	–	2
Portland		–		1	–	5	–	1
Rankings from AP Poll

The 1939 Saint Mary's Gaels football team was an American football team that represented Saint Mary's College of California during the 1939 college football season. In their 19th and final season under head coach Slip Madigan, the Gaels compiled a 3–4–1 record and outscored their opponents by a combined total of 84 to 57.

Saint Mary's was ranked at No. 67 (out of 609 teams) in the final Litkenhous Ratings for 1939.

== Schedule ==
Date	Opponent	Rank	Site	Result	Attendance	Source
October 1	Gonzaga		Kezar Stadium; San Francisco CA	W 19–0		
October 7	at California		California Memorial Stadium; Berkeley, CA	W 7–3		
October 22	vs. No. 17 Santa Clara	No. 20	Kezar Stadium; San Francisco, CA	L 0–7	45,000	
October 29	Portland		Kezar Stadium; San Francisco, CA	L 12–14	2,500	
November 5	Dayton		Kezar Stadium; San Francisco, CA	T 6–6	10,000	
November 12	at San Francisco		Kezar Stadium; San Francisco, CA	L 0–7		
November 18	at Fordham		Polo Grounds; New York, NY	L 0–13	34,800	
December 3	at Loyola		Los Angeles Memorial Coliseum; Los Angeles CA	W 40–7		
Rankings from AP Poll released prior to the game
