= Hec Cyre =

Canadian gridiron football player (1901–1971)

No. 3, 12
- Positions: Tackle, guard, end

Personal information
- Born: October 25, 1901; Rivière Qui Barre, Alberta
- Died: August 5, 1971 (aged 69); Langley, Washington
- Listed height: 6 ft 2 in (1.88 m)
- Listed weight: 215 lb (98 kg)

Career information
- College: Gonzaga

Career history
- Green Bay Packers (1926); New York Yankees (1928)

Awards and highlights
- Third-team All-American (1925)

Career statistics
- Games played: 13
- Games started: 7
- Stats at Pro Football Reference

Hector J. Cyre (October 25, 1901 – August 5, 1971) was an American football tackle, guard, and end for the Green Bay Packers and New York Yankees of the National Football League (NFL). He played college football for Gonzaga.

== Biography ==
Cyre was born on October 25, 1901, in Rivière Qui Barre, Alberta. He attended Gonzaga where he played college football. He played ten games, starting six, for the Green Bay Packers in 1926. He also played three games, starting one, for the New York Yankees in 1928. He died on August 5, 1971, in Langley, Washington, at 69. He was inducted into the Gonzaga Athletic Hall of Fame in 1991.
