= 1939 Cal Aggies football team =

American college football season

1939 Cal Aggies football
- Conference: Far Western Conference
- Record: 4–4 (0–3 FWC)
- Head coach: Vern Hickey (3rd season)
- Home stadium: A Street field

1939 Far Western Conference football standings
	Conf.					Overall
Team	W		L		T	W		L		T
Fresno State	2	–	0	–	0	10	–	1	–	1
Nevada $	3	–	1	–	0	5	–	4	–	0
Pacific (CA)	2	–	2	–	0	6	–	6	–	1
Chico State	1	–	2	–	0	2	–	4	–	2
Cal Aggies	0	–	3	–	0	4	–	4	–	0
$ – Conference champion; Fresno State was ineligible for the conference championship because they only played two league games.

The 1939 Cal Aggies football team represented the College of Agriculture at Davis—now known as the University of California, Davis—as a member of the Far Western Conference (FWC) during the 1939 college football season. Led by third-year head coach Vern Hickey, the Aggies compiled an overall record of 4–4 with a mark of 0–3 in conference play, placing last out of five teams in the FWC. The team outscored its opponents 92 to 73 for the season.

The Cal Aggies were ranked at No. 233 (out of 609 teams) in the final Litkenhous Ratings for 1939.

The Cal Aggies played home games at A Street field on campus in Davis, California.

== Schedule ==
Date	Opponent	Site	Result	Attendance	Source
September 30	at California*	California Memorial Stadium; Berkeley, CA	L 14–32		
October 6	at San Francisco State*	Roberts Field; San Francisco, CA	W 7–0	5,500	
October 14	Humboldt State*	A Street field; Davis, CA	W 12–2		
October 20	at Sacramento*	Sacramento Stadium; Sacramento, CA	W 12–6		
October 28	at Nevada	Mackay Stadium (Note: This stadium is the predecessor to the current Mackay Stadium, which was opened for the 1966 season.); Reno, NV	L 0–3		
November 4	Cal Poly*	A Street field; Davis, CA (rivalry)	W 28–0		
November 10	at Pacific (CA)	Baxter Stadium; Stockton, CA	L 12–21		
November 18	Chico State	A Street field; Davis, CA	L 7–9		
*Non-conference game
