= 1939 Hawaii Rainbows football team =

American college football season

1939 Hawaii Rainbows football

Pineapple Bowl, L 6–39 vs. Oregon State
- Conference: Independent
- Record: 3–6
- Head coach: Otto Klum (19th season)
- Home stadium: Honolulu Stadium

1939 Western college football independents records
	Conf.			Overall
Team	W	L	T	W		L		T
San Diego Marines		–		11	–	0	–	0
No. T–14 Santa Clara		–		5	–	1	–	3
Gonzaga		–		6	–	2	–	0
Humboldt State		–		5	–	2	–	0
Idaho Southern Branch		–		5	–	2	–	0
Cal Poly		–		4	–	4	–	1
San Francisco		–		4	–	3	–	3
La Verne		–		3	–	3	–	0
Saint Mary's		–		3	–	4	–	1
Hawaii		–		3	–	6	–	0
Loyola (CA)		–		2	–	6	–	1
San Francisco State		–		2	–	4	–	2
Portland		–		1	–	5	–	1
Rankings from AP Poll

The 1939 Hawaii Rainbows football team represented the University of Hawaiʻi (now known as the University of Hawaiʻi at Mānoa) as an independent during the 1939 college football season. Led by 19th-year head coach Otto Klum, the Rainbows compiled an overall record of 3–6.

== Schedule ==
Date	Opponent	Site	Result	Attendance	Source
October 6	Hawaiian Polar Bears	Honolulu Stadium; Honolulu, Territory of Hawaii	W 12–6	18,000	
October 13	Healani	Honolulu Stadium; Honolulu, Territory of Hawaii	L 13–24	14,000	
October 20	Pearl Harbor Navy	Honolulu Stadium; Honolulu, Territory of Hawaii	W 30–0	9,000	
October 26	Hawaiian Polar Bears	Honolulu Stadium; Honolulu, Territory of Hawaii	L 6–7	13,000	
November 11	at Utah	Ute Stadium; Salt Lake City, UT	L 19–34	13,200	
November 15	at San Diego State	Aztec Bowl; San Diego, CA	W 13–0	4,000	
December 2	Fresno State	Honolulu Stadium; Honolulu, Territory of Hawaii (rivalry)	L 2–38	22,000	
December 16	Pacific (CA)	Honolulu Stadium; Honolulu, Territory of Hawaii	L 6–19	15,000	
January 1	Oregon State	Honolulu Stadium; Honolulu, Territory of Hawaii (Pineapple Bowl)	L 6–39	15,000	
