= 1939 Humboldt State Lumberjacks football team =

American college football season

1939 Humboldt State Lumberjacks football
- Conference: Independent
- Record: 5–2
- Head coach: Herbert L. Hart (2nd season)
- Home stadium: Albee Stadium

1939 Western college football independents records
	Conf.			Overall
Team	W	L	T	W		L		T
San Diego Marines		–		11	–	0	–	0
No. T–14 Santa Clara		–		5	–	1	–	3
Gonzaga		–		6	–	2	–	0
Humboldt State		–		5	–	2	–	0
Idaho Southern Branch		–		5	–	2	–	0
Cal Poly		–		4	–	4	–	1
San Francisco		–		4	–	3	–	3
La Verne		–		3	–	3	–	0
Saint Mary's		–		3	–	4	–	1
Hawaii		–		3	–	6	–	0
Loyola (CA)		–		2	–	6	–	1
San Francisco State		–		2	–	4	–	2
Portland		–		1	–	5	–	1
Rankings from AP Poll

The 1939 Humboldt State Lumberjacks football team represented Humboldt State College—now known as California State Polytechnic University, Humboldt—as an independent during the 1939 college football season. Led by second-year head coach Herbert L. Hart, the Lumberjacks compiled a record of 5–2 and outscored their opponents 90 to 34 for the season. They shut outs three opponents and allowed more than ten points only once. The team played home games at Albee Stadium in Eureka, California.

Humboldt was ranked at No. 322 (out of 609 teams) in the final Litkenhous Ratings for 1939.

== Schedule ==
Date	Opponent	Site	Result	Attendance	Source
September 22	Linfield	Albee Stadium; Eureka, CA	W 13–7		
September 30	Cal Poly	Albee Stadium; Eureka, CA	W 13–9		
October 14	at Cal Aggies	A Street Field; Davis, CA	L 2–14		
October 21	San Francisco State	Albee Stadium; Eureka, CA	W 19–0		
October 27	Chico State	Albee Stadium; Eureka, CA	W 6–0	4,000	
November 4	Alhambra Athletic Club	Albee Stadium?; Eureka, CA?	L 0–6		
November 10	Oregon College	Albee Stadium; Eureka, CA	W 38–0		
