= Puggy Hunton =

American football player and coach (1902–1967)

Biographical details
- Born: August 28, 1902; Porum, Oklahoma, U.S.
- Died: October 3, 1967 (aged 65); Spokane, Washington, U.S.
- Education: Gonzaga University (1927)

Playing career
- 1925–1926: Gonzaga

Coaching career (HC unless noted)
- 1927–1928: Cogswell HS (CA)
- 1929–1938: Gonzaga Prep (WA)
- 1939–1941: Gonzaga

Head coaching record
- Overall: 14–13–1 (college); 74–10 (high school)

John W. "Puggy" Hunton (August 28, 1902 – October 3, 1967) was an American football coach. He was the last head football coach at Gonzaga University, leading the Gonzaga Bulldogs in their final three seasons, from 1939 to 1941. Prior to his tenure with the Bulldogs, he was a high school coach at Gonzaga Preparatory School in Spokane and Cogswell High School of San Francisco.

== Early life ==
Born in Porum, Oklahoma, Hunton played college football. After he graduated from Gonzaga in 1927, Hunton served as head coach for the football squad at Cogswell High School of San Francisco prior to accepting the head coaching position at the Gonzaga Preparatory School, in 1928. During his ten-year tenure at Gonzaga Prep, he led them to seven city championships and five undefeated seasons en route to an overall record of 74 wins and ten losses (.881).

== Gonzaga ==
On March 5, 1939, Hunton was introduced as Gonzaga's head football coach as a replacement for fellow alumnus Mike Pecarovich, who left for Loyola in Los Angeles. In his first season, Hunton led the Bulldogs to an upset over Oregon at Hayward Field. For his efforts in the upset, Hunton was named coach of the week by various selectors. During his three-year tenure at Gonzaga University, Hunton had an overall record of 14–13–1.

Gonzaga fielded its last varsity football team in 1941. Like many colleges, the football program went on hiatus during World War II (in April 1942), but after the war the administration decided not to resume it. The program had been in financial difficulty prior to the war.

After Hunton was hired from Gonzaga Prep in 1939, he earned substantially less than his predecessor. In late August 1940, he signed a three-year contract, retroactive to July 1, at $2,500 per year. When the program was dropped, Hunton was released as head coach and not paid for his final year. He filed suit against the university regarding the contract, which was settled out of court in 1943.

== Head coaching record ==
=== College ===
Year	Coach	Overall	Conference	Standing	Bowl/playoffs
Gonzaga Bulldogs (Independent) (1939–1941)
1939	Gonzaga	6–2			
1940	Gonzaga	5–4–1			
1941	Gonzaga	3–7			
Gonzaga:		14–13–1			
Total:		14–13–1			
