= 1939 Pacific Tigers football team =

American college football season

1939 Pacific Tigers football
- Conference: Far Western Conference
- Record: 6–6–1 (2–2 FWC)
- Head coach: Amos Alonzo Stagg (7th season)
- Home stadium: Baxter Stadium

1939 Far Western Conference football standings
| | Conf. | | | | | Overall |
| Team | W | | L | | T | W | | L | | T |
|---|---|---|---|---|---|---|---|---|---|---|
| Fresno State | 2 | – | 0 | – | 0 | 10 | – | 1 | – | 1 |
| Nevada $ | 3 | – | 1 | – | 0 | 5 | – | 4 | – | 0 |
| Pacific (CA) | 2 | – | 2 | – | 0 | 6 | – | 6 | – | 1 |
| Chico State | 1 | – | 2 | – | 0 | 2 | – | 4 | – | 2 |
| Cal Aggies | 0 | – | 3 | – | 0 | 4 | – | 4 | – | 0 |
$ – Conference champion; Fresno State was ineligible for the conference championship because they only played two league games.

The 1939 Pacific Tigers football team represented the College of the Pacific—now known as the University of the Pacific—in Stockton, California as a member of the Far Western Conference (FWC) during the 1939 college football season. Led by seventh-year head coach Amos Alonzo Stagg, Pacific compiled an overall record of 6–6–1 with a mark of 2–2 in conference play, placing second in the FWC. The team outscored its opponents 145 to 116 for the season.

Pacific was ranked at No. 138 (out of 609 teams) in the final Litkenhous Ratings for 1939.

The Tigers played home games at Baxter Stadium in Stockton.

== Schedule ==
| Date | Opponent | Site | Result | Attendance | Source |
|---|---|---|---|---|---|
| September 23 | South Dakota* | Charles C. Hughes Stadium; Sacramento, CA | W 6–0 | | |
| September 30 | at California* | California Memorial Stadium; Berkeley, CA | W 6–0 | | |
| October 6 | at Loyola (CA)* | Gilmore Stadium; Los Angeles, CA | T 13–13 | 10,000 | |
| October 20 | San Jose State*^{†} | Baxter Stadium; Stockton, CA (rivalry) | L 3–13 | 15,000 | |
| October 27 | California JV* | Baxter Stadium; Stockton, CA | W 32–7 | | |
| November 4 | at Fresno State | Fresno State College Stadium; Fresno, CA | L 0–7 | 11,227 | |
| November 10 | Northern Branch | Baxter Stadium; Stockton, CA | W 21–12 | | |
| November 18 | at Arizona* | Arizona Stadium; Tucson, AZ | L 7–12 | | |
| November 23 | at Chico State | College Field; Chico, California | W 31–6 | | |
| December 2 | Nevada | Baxter Stadium; Stockton, CA | L 0–8 | | |
| December 7 | at San Diego Marines* | San Diego, CA | L 0–14 | 12,000 | |
| December 16 | at Hawaii* | Honolulu Stadium; Honolulu, Territory of Hawaii | W 19–6 | 15,000–18,000 | |
| December 20 | at Healani Athletic Club* | Honolulu Stadium; Honolulu, Territory of Hawaii | L 7–18 | | |
*Non-conference game; ^{†}Homecoming
