= 1939 San Francisco Dons football team =

American college football season

1939 San Francisco Dons football
- Conference: Independent
- Record: 4–3–3
- Head coach: George Malley (3rd season)
- Home stadium: Kezar Stadium

1939 Western college football independents records
	Conf.			Overall
Team	W	L	T	W		L		T
San Diego Marines		–		11	–	0	–	0
No. T–14 Santa Clara		–		5	–	1	–	3
Gonzaga		–		6	–	2	–	0
Humboldt State		–		5	–	2	–	0
Idaho Southern Branch		–		5	–	2	–	0
Cal Poly		–		4	–	4	–	1
San Francisco		–		4	–	3	–	3
La Verne		–		3	–	3	–	0
Saint Mary's		–		3	–	4	–	1
Hawaii		–		3	–	6	–	0
Loyola (CA)		–		2	–	6	–	1
San Francisco State		–		2	–	4	–	2
Portland		–		1	–	5	–	1
Rankings from AP Poll

The 1939 San Francisco Dons football team was an American football team that represented the University of San Francisco as an independent during the 1941 college football season. In their third season under head coach George Malley, the Dons compiled a 4–3–3 record and outscored their opponents by a combined total of 92 to 91.

San Francisco was ranked at No. 92 (out of 609 teams) in the final Litkenhous Ratings for 1939.

== Schedule ==
Date	Opponent	Site	Result	Attendance	Source
September 17	St. Mary's (TX)	Kezar Stadium; San Francisco	L 6–7	10,000	
September 23	San Jose State	Kezar Stadium; San Francisco	L 6–16	< 3,000	
September 29	Hardin–Simmons	Seals Stadium; San Francisco	T 6–6	5,000	
October 7	at Montana	Missoula, MT	W 12–7		
October 15	Santa Clara	Kezar Stadium; San Francisco	T 13–13	25,000	
October 21	at Santa Barbara State	La Playa Field; Santa Barbara, CA	T 0–0		
October 28	at Fresno State	Fresno State College Stadium; Fresno, CA	L 2–21		
November 5	at Loyola (CA)	Gilmore Stadium; Los Angeles	W 14–7	12,000	
November 12	Saint Mary's	Kezar Stadium; San Francisco	W 7–0		
December 3	vs. Creighton	Sacramento Stadium; Sacramento, CA	W 26–14	9,900	
