= William S. Higgins =

American sports coach, dentist (1894–1944)

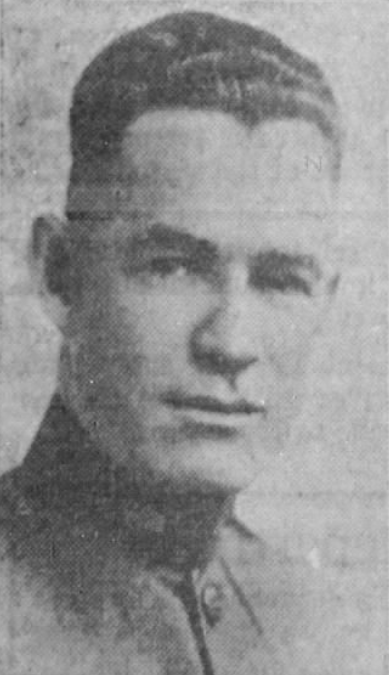
- Higgins pictured in the Spokane Daily Chronicle, 1919

Biographical details
- Born: 1894; Almira, Washington, U.S.
- Died: September 25, 1944; Spokane, Washington, U.S.

Playing career

Football
- c. 1913: Gonzaga
- 1917–1918: Saint Louis

Basketball
- c. 1913: Gonzaga

Baseball
- c. 1913: Gonzaga
- Positions: Fullback, halfback (football); Guard (basketball); Catcher (baseball)

Coaching career (HC unless noted)

Football
- 1914: Loyola HS (MT)
- 1919: Gonzaga

Basketball
- 1914–1915: Loyola HS (MT)
- 1915–1916: Gonzaga

Head coaching record
- Overall: 2–3 (college football); 2–7 (college basketball)

William S. Higgins (1894 – September 25, 1944) was an American college football player, coach, and official, college basketball coach, and dentist. He served as the head football coach at Gonzaga University for one season, in 1919, compiling a record of 2–3. Higgins was also the head basketball coach at Gonzaga for the 1915–16 season, tallying a mark of 2–7.

Higgins was born in Almira, Washington. He lettered in football, basketball, and baseball at Gonzaga. He played a guard in basketball and as a catcher on the baseball team before graduating from in 1914. Higgins spent the 1914–15 year at Loyoyla High School in Missoula, Montana as a teacher and coach of football and basketball. Higgins then went to Saint Louis University to study dentistry. There again played football, as a fullback and halfback. He was elected captain of the 1918 Saint Louis Billikens football team. After earning his dental degree from Saint Louis in 1919, he returned to Gonzaga as athletic coach.

Higgins later officiated football games for the Pacific Coast Conference. He practiced as a dentist in Spokane, Washington until retiring in 1944 due to poor health. Higgins died on September 25, 1944, in Spokane.

== Head coaching record ==
=== Football ===
Year	Team	Overall	Conference	Standing	Bowl/playoffs
Gonzaga Blue and White (Independent) (1919)
1919	Gonzaga	2–3			
Gonzaga:		2–3			
Total:		2–3			
