= Herbert Hart (cricketer) =

English cricketer

Personal information
- Born: 21 September 1859; Cottingham, East Riding of Yorkshire, England, UK
- Died: 2 November 1895 (aged 36); Cottingham, East Riding of Yorkshire, England, UK
- Batting: Left-handed
- Bowling: Left-handed fast

Domestic team information
- Years: Team
- 1888: Yorkshire County Cricket Club

Herbert William Hart (21 September 1859 – 2 November 1895) was an English first-class cricketer, who played one match as an amateur for Yorkshire County Cricket Club in 1888.

== Biography ==
Born in Cottingham, near Hull, East Riding of Yorkshire, England, Hart was a left arm fast bowler, whose only outing came against the Marylebone Cricket Club (MCC) at Lord's. After going wicketless in the first innings, he took 2 for 19 in the second innings, clean bowling Wilfred Flowers for a duck and Charles Wright for 14. However, Yorkshire lost by 103 runs. He scored 3 in each innings, batting at number nine. He was one of eight victims for George Hearne (8 for 30) in Yorkshire's first innings, in which Hearne took a hat-trick.

Hart died in Cottingham aged 36, in November 1895.
