= Gonzaga Bulldogs football =

Former university football team

- First season: 1892; 134 years ago
- Last season: 1941; 85 years ago
- Location: Spokane, Washington
- Stadium: Gonzaga Stadium (1922–1941)
- Conference: Independent; Northwest (1924–1925)
- Colors: Navy blue, white, and red
- All-time record: 134–99–20 (.569)
- Bowl record: 0–1 (.000)

Conference championships
- Northwest Conference: 1 (1924)
- Rivalries: Idaho (rivalry)

The Gonzaga Bulldogs football team represented Gonzaga University of Spokane, Washington, in the sport of college football. Gonzaga last fielded a varsity football team 85 years ago in 1941. From 1892 to 1941, Gonzaga went 134–99–20 (.569) with one bowl appearance, in 1922 in the San Diego East-West Christmas Classic. The Bulldogs lost to the undefeated West Virginia Mountaineers, who claimed a share of the national title that season.

Like many colleges, the Gonzaga football program went on hiatus during World War II (in April 1942), but after the war the administration decided not to resume it. The program had been in financial difficulty prior to the war.

GU's most notable football player was running back Tony Canadeo (1919–2003) from Chicago, who played in the NFL for the Green Bay Packers from 1941 to 1952 and was elected to the Pro Football Hall of Fame in 1974. Ray Flaherty joined him as a hall of famer (as a head coach) in 1976. Flaherty was a Gonzaga teammate of Houston Stockton, a noted halfback in the 1920s (and the paternal grandfather of basketball star John Stockton). Their head coach at Gonzaga was Gus Dorais, who threw to college teammate Knute Rockne at Notre Dame in 1913.

== Stadium ==
The Gonzaga football stadium, built in 1922, was used for city high school football until it was deemed unsafe by the city after the 1947 season. The white-painted wooden venue hosted a professional preseason game in 1946 under the lights, between the New York Yankees and Brooklyn Dodgers of the new All-America Football Conference. High school football moved to Ferris Field in 1948 and to the new Memorial Stadium in 1950, renamed for Gonzaga alumnus Joe Albi in 1962. The Gonzaga Stadium football field is now occupied by the Foley Center Library (1992) and its Foley Lawn.

== Head coaching history ==
Head coach	Seasons	Record	References
Henry Luhn	1892–1898	7–0–2	
Unknown	1907	0–0–1	
George M. Varnell	1908–1911	10–4–1	
Fred Burns	1912	2–1–0	
Robert E. Harmon	1913–1914	11–4	
William J. Coyle	1915	3–3	
John F. McGough	1916	3–2	
Jimmy Condon	1917	3–0	
C. A. Mullin	1918	0–2–1	
William S. Higgins	1919	2–3	
Gus Dorais	1920–1924	20–13–3	
Clipper Smith	1925–1928	23–9–5	
Robert L. Mathews	1929	4–3	
Ray Flaherty	1930	1–7–1	
Mike Pecarovich	1931–1938	31–35–5	
Puggy Hunton	1939–1941	14–13–1	
40 seasons		134–99–20	

== All Americans ==
All Americans
Year	Name	Position	Team
1924	Hust Stockton	HB	2nd
1924	Hec Cyre	DT	AP 3rd
1932	Max Krause	FB	AP 1st/ AP Little All American 1st
1937	George Karamatic	FB	NEA 1st/ UP 2nd
