= Mike Pecarovich =

American football coach, lawyer, and actor (1898–1965)

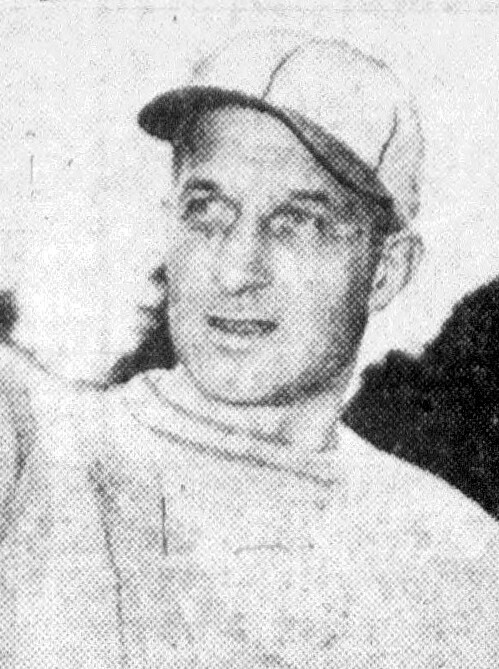

Biographical details
- Born: September 23, 1898; Astoria, Oregon, U.S.
- Died: March 22, 1965 (aged 66); Rolling Hills, California, U.S.

Playing career
- 1919–1921: Santa Clara
- 1922: Gonzaga
- Positions: Quarterback, end, guard

Coaching career (HC unless noted)
- 1923: Gonzaga (assistant)
- 1924–1925: Gonzaga Prep (WA)
- 1926: Los Angeles Angels (PCPL)
- 1928: Loyola (CA)
- 1929–1930: Cathedral HS (CA)
- 1931–1938: Gonzaga
- 1939: Loyola (CA)
- 1944: San Francisco Clippers
- 1960–1961: San Diego

Head coaching record
- Overall: 44–57–7 (college)

Michael J. Pecarovich (September 23, 1898 – March 23, 1965) was an American football coach and actor. He served as the head football coach at Loyola University of Los Angeles—now known as Loyola Marymount University—in 1928 and 1939, Gonzaga University from 1931 to 1938, and the University of San Diego from 1960 to 1961. Pecarovich also coached two professional teams, the Los Angeles Angels of the Pacific Coast Professional Football League and the San Francisco Clippers of the California-based American Football League.

== Early life ==
Pecarovich was the son of Croatian immigrants (his father Nikola was from Vis) born in Astoria, Oregon, Pecarovich attended Santa Clara University, where he played on the football team from 1919 to 1921 as a guard and an end. Pecarovich then transferred to Gonzaga University in Spokane, where he played football as a quarterback under head coach Gus Dorais. He graduated in 1922, and was an assistant under Dorais. In 1924, Pecarovich earned a law degree and passed the bar exam.

== Coaching career ==
After law school, Pecarovich coached the Gonzaga High School football team for two years, then led the Los Angeles Angels football team in the Pacific Coast Professional League, until 1928. That year, Pecarovich took over as head football coach at Loyola, where he installed the Knute Rockne system. The Lions amassed a 5–3 record in 1928. In 1929 and 1930, he coached Cathedral High School in Los Angeles.

Pecarovich returned to his alma mater Gonzaga in 1931 to succeed Ray Flaherty as head coach. While there, Pecarovich appointed Bing Crosby, a friend and former classmate, as an assistant coach, and made appearances in several movies alongside Crosby. He remained at Gonzaga through 1938 and compiled a 31–35–5 (.472) record in eight seasons.

In 1939, Pecarovich returned to coach Loyola, which gave him a three-year contract; the Gonzaga administration agreed to release him from the two years remaining on his contract. His second stint with Loyola was not successful, his team earning a 2–5–1 record, and he was replaced by Marty Brill. He applied for the head coaching position at the University of Idaho in Moscow in 1941, but was not hired despite being considered a strong candidate.

Pecarovich coached the San Francisco Clippers in 1944 in the short-lived American Football League of the Pacific Coast. He led the franchise to a second-place finish with a 7–3 record in the eight-team league's only season. He later served as an assistant coach under Flaherty with the New York Yankees professional football team, then taught at St. Anthony High School in Long Beach for ten years in the 1950s.

On April 27, 1960, the University of San Diego announced it had signed Pecarovich to a two-year contract as its head football coach. He led the Toreros to a 6–13–1 (.325) record over two seasons. However, after the 1961 season, the school disbanded its football program.

== Later life ==
Pecarovich earned a reputation as a skilled after-dinner speaker, and provided many lectures in his later life. He also used his oration skills during halftime pep talks, and people who knew both men compared him to Knute Rockne, who had been a famed motivator as the Notre Dame coach. Pecarovich died of a heart attack on March 22, 1965, in his home in Rolling Hills, California, and was buried at All Souls Cemetery in Long Beach.

He was the namesake for Pecarovich Field at Gonzaga, a $25,000 baseball venue which opened in 1967; it was renamed August/ART Stadium in 1996 and razed in 2003 to construct the McCarthey Center. The Gonzaga Athletic Hall of Fame inducted Pecarovich in its class of 1991.

== Head coaching record ==
=== College ===
Year	Team	Overall	Conference	Standing	Bowl/playoffs
Loyola Lions (Independent) (1928)
1928	Loyola	5–3			
Gonzaga Bulldogs (Independent) (1931–1938)
1931	Gonzaga	3–4			
1932	Gonzaga	5–3			
1933	Gonzaga	2–6–1			
1934	Gonzaga	8–2–1			
1935	Gonzaga	5–4–1			
1936	Gonzaga	5–3			
1937	Gonzaga	2–6–2			
1938	Gonzaga	1–7			
Gonzaga:		31–35–1			
Loyola Lions (Independent) (1939)
1939	Loyola	2–6–1			
Loyola:		7–9–1			
San Diego Toreros (Independent) (1960–1961)
1960	San Diego	4–5–1			
1961	San Diego	2–8			
San Diego:		6–13–1			
Total:		44–57–7			

== See also ==
- List of college football head coaches with non-consecutive tenure
