= 1939 college football season =

American college football season

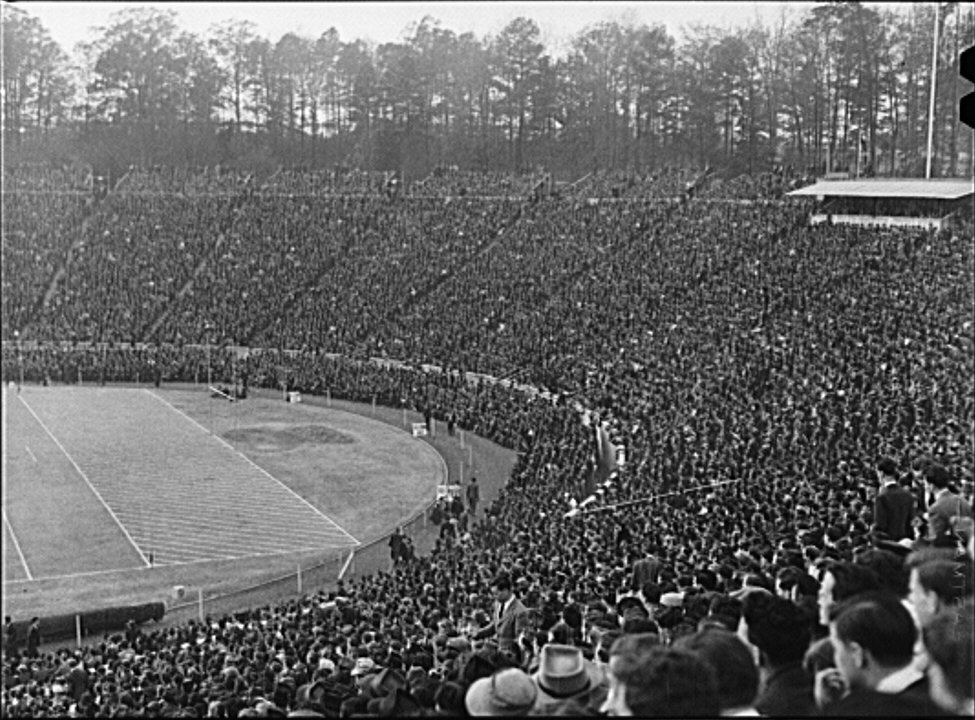
- Wallace Wade Stadium during the 1939 Victory Bell game between Duke and North Carolina.
- First AP No. 1 of season: Pittsburgh
- Number of bowls: 5
- Champion(s): Texas A&M (Note: per AP poll, Boand System, Dunkel System, Houlgate System, Poling System, Williamson System, Berryman QPRS, Billingsley Report, College Football Researchers Association, DeVold System, Helms Athletic Foundation, National Championship Foundation, Sagarin Ratings Elo chess method); USC (Note: per Dickinson System); Cornell (Note: per Litkenhous Ratings and Sagarin Ratings Predictor method)
- Heisman: Nile Kinnick (halfback, Iowa)

The 1939 college football season concluded with the Aggies of The Agricultural and Mechanical College of Texas (Texas A&M) being named as the national champions by the voters in the Associated Press writers' poll. Led by consensus All-American fullback John Kimbrough, the Aggies went undefeated at 11–0 and outscored their opponents by a combined total of 212 to 31, with the defense allowing just 54 first downs and 763 yards all season, or 1.71 yards per play. On New Year's Day, Texas A&M defeated Tulane, 14–13 in the Sugar Bowl.

The Volunteers of the University of Tennessee were 10–0 and unscored upon in the regular season. For the second straight year, they finished second in the AP Poll (the final poll in this era came out before postseason bowl games). In the 1940 Rose Bowl, the Volunteers faced the University of Southern California, who scored two touchdowns to defeat them, 14–0. One of that year's seven contemporary math system selectors, Frank Dickinson, named 8–0–2 USC as his No. 1 choice. In 2004, USC decided to recognize this selection to claim a share of the 1939 title.

The 1939 Cornell Big Red finished 8–0 and was selected by one (Litkenhous System) of the six other contemporary math systems as its No. 1 team. The remaining five chose Texas A&M.

The first AP Poll of the season was taken after four weeks of play, starting with October 16. Each writer listed his choice for the top ten teams, and points were tallied based on 10 for first place, 9 for second, etc., and the AP then ranked the twenty teams with the highest number of points.

== Conference and program changes ==
=== Conferences ===
- One new conference began football play in 1939:
  - California Collegiate Athletic Association – an active NCAA Division II conference that ended sponsorship of football in 1981

=== Programs ===
School	1938 Conference	1939 Conference
DePaul Blue Demons	Independent	Dropped Program
Grinnell Pioneers	Independent	Missouri Valley

== September ==
September 30 Defending champion TCU lost at UCLA, 6–2, on September 29, and finished 3–7–0. Tennessee won at N.C. State, 13–0. Duke beat Davidson 26–6. Oklahoma and SMU played to a 7–7 tie. Notre Dame beat Purdue 3–0. Tulane edged Clemson 7–6. Fordham defeated Waynesburg 34–7 in the first-ever televised football game.

== October ==
October 7 Tennessee beat Sewanee 40–0. Duke defeated Colgate 37–0. Notre Dame beat Georgia Tech 17–14. Tulane beat Auburn 12–0. Oklahoma won at Northwestern, 23–0.

October 14 Pittsburgh beat Duke 14–13. Tennessee won at Chattanooga, 28–0. Notre Dame edged SMU, 20–19. Tulane beat Fordham 7–0. Oklahoma beat Texas 24–12. The first AP Poll of the year listed Pittsburgh, Notre Dame, Oklahoma, Tulane, and Tennessee as the top five.

October 21 No. 1 Pittsburgh lost to cross-town rival Duquesne, 21–13. In Cleveland, No. 2 Notre Dame defeated Navy, 14–7. No. 3 Oklahoma beat Kansas 27–7, but still fell to sixth in the next AP Poll. No. 4 Tulane and visiting No. 14 North Carolina played to a 14–14 tie. No. 5 Tennessee continued shutting out its opponents, beating No. 8 Alabama 21–0. No. 6 Michigan visited the Windy City and handed the University of Chicago an 85–0 defeat. No. 9 Texas A&M reached 5–0–0 with a 20–6 win over TCU. No. 10 Ohio State won at Minnesota, 23–20. The AP selected Tennessee, Notre Dame, Michigan, Texas A&M, and Ohio State as its top five.

October 28 No. 1 Tennessee defeated Mercer, 17–0. In Pittsburgh, No. 2 Notre Dame edged Carnegie Tech, 7–6. No. 3 Michigan beat Yale 27–7. No. 4 Ohio State lost to No. 7 Cornell, 23–14. No. 5 Texas A&M beat Baylor 20–0. Nebraska defeated Kansas State in the second televised football game 25–9. In the next AP Poll, Tennessee remained at No. 1, while Michigan and Cornell moved ahead of Notre Dame (the Irish were 5–0–0, but each win was by a touchdown or less) and Texas A&M stayed at No. 5.

== November ==
November 4 No. 1 Tennessee won at No. 18 LSU, 20–0. No. 2 Michigan lost at unranked Illinois, 16–7. No. 3 Cornell beat Columbia 13–7. At Yankee Stadium, No. 4 Notre Dame beat Army 14–0. No. 5 Texas A&M won at Arkansas 27–0. No. 7 USC beat No. 11 Oregon State 19–7 in Portland. The next AP Poll was No. 1 Tennessee, No. 2 Texas A&M, No. 3 Notre Dame, No. 4 USC, and No. 5 Cornell.

November 11 No. 1 Tennessee shut out The Citadel, 34–0. No. 2 Texas A&M defeated No. 13 SMU 6–2. No. 3 Notre Dame, after several close calls in previous games, finally lost at unranked Iowa, 7–6. No. 4 USC beat Stanford 20–12. No. 5 Cornell narrowly beat Colgate 14–12. No. 6 Oklahoma won at Kansas State 13–10. Tennessee and Texas A&M remained first and second in the next poll, followed by USC, Cornell, and Oklahoma.

November 18 No. 1 Tennessee extended its shutout streak, beating Vanderbilt 13–0. Having outscored its opposition, 186–0, Tennessee had a record of 8–0–0, but fell to second in the poll that followed. Their replacement in the top spot was No. 2 Texas A&M, which won at Rice 19–0. No. 3 USC was idle. No. 4 Cornell won at No. 20 Dartmouth, 35–6, to stay unbeaten, and they swapped spots with USC in the next poll. No. 5 Oklahoma lost at No. 12 Missouri, 7–6. No. 6 Tulane beat Columbia 25–0 to move into fifth place.

In the next poll, Texas A&M—which had gotten none of the first place votes the week before—was first, with 38 votes. Tennessee, which had had 66 of the 85 No. 1 votes the week before, had 33 on the new round of ballots, and finished second. There were 20 for Cornell, and 11 for USC.

November 25 No. 1 Texas A&M and No. 2 Tennessee were idle. In Philadelphia, No. 3 Cornell closed its season with a 26–0 win over Penn, to finish unbeaten and untied at 8–0–0. No. 4 USC won at No. 7 Notre Dame, 20–12. No. 5 Tulane beat Sewanee 52–0. In the next round of voting, Texas A&M and USC tied for first place, with 939 points apiece. Cornell led all teams with 34 first-place votes (A&M received 27 and USC 25), but their 909 overall points put them in third place. Tennessee fell to No. 4 and Tulane remained at No. 5.

On Thanksgiving Day, which fell on November 30 in 1939, No. 1 Texas A&M beat Texas 20–0 to complete a 10–0–0 season, and No. 4 Tennessee won at Kentucky, 19–0. Two days later, December 2, No. 1 USC beat Washington 9–7. No. 5 Tulane beat LSU 33–20. Texas A&M now stood alone in first place, followed by No. 2 Tennessee, No. 3 USC, No. 4 Cornell, and No. 5 Tulane.

December 9 No. 1 Texas A&M had finished its season and accepted a bid to the Sugar Bowl. No. 2 Tennessee beat Auburn 7–0. No. 3 USC and No. 9 UCLA played to a 0–0 tie. No. 4 Cornell and No. 5 Tulane had both completed their seasons, and the top five remained unchanged.

== Conference standings ==
=== Major conference standings ===
1939 Big Six Conference football standings
	Conf.					Overall
Team	W		L		T	W		L		T
No. 6 Missouri $	5	–	0	–	0	8	–	2	–	0
No. 18 Nebraska	4	–	1	–	0	7	–	1	–	1
No. 19 Oklahoma	3	–	2	–	0	6	–	2	–	1
Kansas	1	–	4	–	0	2	–	6	–	0
Iowa State	1	–	4	–	0	2	–	7	–	0
Kansas State	1	–	4	–	0	4	–	5	–	0
$ – Conference champion; Rankings from AP Poll

1939 Big Ten Conference football standings
	Conf.					Overall
Team	W		L		T	W		L		T
No. 15 Ohio State $	5	–	1	–	0	6	–	2	–	0
No. 9 Iowa	4	–	1	–	1	6	–	1	–	1
No. 20 Michigan	3	–	2	–	0	6	–	2	–	0
Purdue	2	–	1	–	2	3	–	3	–	2
Northwestern	3	–	2	–	1	3	–	4	–	1
Illinois	3	–	3	–	0	3	–	4	–	1
Minnesota	2	–	3	–	1	3	–	4	–	1
Indiana	2	–	3	–	0	2	–	4	–	2
Wisconsin	0	–	5	–	1	1	–	6	–	1
Chicago	0	–	3	–	0	2	–	6	–	0
$ – Conference champion; Rankings from AP Poll

1939 Border Conference football standings
	Conf.					Overall
Team	W		L		T	W		L		T
Arizona State $	4	–	0	–	0	8	–	2	–	1
New Mexico	4	–	2	–	0	8	–	2	–	0
Texas Tech	2	–	1	–	0	5	–	5	–	1
Texas Mines	3	–	2	–	0	5	–	4	–	0
Arizona	1	–	2	–	0	6	–	4	–	0
New Mexico A&M	1	–	4	–	0	3	–	6	–	0
Arizona State–Flagstaff	0	–	4	–	0	1	–	6	–	1
$ – Conference champion

1939 Mountain States Conference football standings
	Conf.					Overall
Team	W		L		T	W		L		T
Colorado $	5	–	1	–	0	5	–	3	–	0
Utah	4	–	1	–	1	6	–	1	–	2
Denver	3	–	2	–	1	5	–	3	–	1
BYU	2	–	2	–	2	5	–	2	–	2
Utah State	2	–	3	–	1	3	–	4	–	1
Colorado A&M	2	–	4	–	0	2	–	7	–	0
Wyoming	0	–	5	–	1	0	–	7	–	1
$ – Conference champion

1939 Pacific Coast Conference football standings
	Conf.					Overall
Team	W		L		T	W		L		T
No. 3 USC $	5	–	0	–	2	8	–	0	–	2
No. 7 UCLA	5	–	0	–	3	6	–	0	–	4
Oregon State	6	–	1	–	1	9	–	1	–	1
Washington	4	–	4	–	0	4	–	5	–	1
Oregon	3	–	3	–	1	3	–	4	–	1
Washington State	3	–	5	–	0	4	–	5	–	0
Montana	1	–	2	–	0	3	–	6	–	0
California	2	–	5	–	0	3	–	7	–	0
Stanford	0	–	6	–	1	1	–	7	–	1
Idaho	0	–	3	–	0	2	–	6	–	0
$ – Conference champion; Rankings from AP Poll

1939 Southeastern Conference football standings
	Conf.					Overall
Team		W		L			W		L
No. 2 Tennessee +	6	–	0	–	0	10	–	1	–	0
No. 16 Georgia Tech +	6	–	0	–	0	8	–	2	–	0
No. 5 Tulane +	5	–	0	–	0	8	–	1	–	1
Mississippi State	3	–	2	–	0	8	–	2	–	0
Ole Miss	2	–	2	–	0	7	–	2	–	0
Kentucky	2	–	2	–	1	6	–	2	–	1
Auburn	3	–	3	–	1	5	–	5	–	1
Alabama	2	–	3	–	1	5	–	3	–	1
Georgia	1	–	3	–	0	5	–	6	–	0
LSU	1	–	5	–	0	4	–	5	–	0
Vanderbilt	1	–	6	–	0	2	–	7	–	1
Florida	0	–	3	–	1	5	–	5	–	1
Sewanee	0	–	3	–	0	3	–	5	–	0
+ – Conference co-champions; Rankings from AP Poll

1939 Southern Conference football standings
	Conf.					Overall
Team	W		L		T	W		L		T
No. 8 Duke $	5	–	0	–	0	8	–	1	–	0
No. 12 Clemson	4	–	0	–	0	9	–	1	–	0
William & Mary	2	–	0	–	1	6	–	2	–	1
North Carolina	5	–	1	–	0	8	–	1	–	1
VMI	3	–	1	–	1	6	–	3	–	1
Richmond	3	–	1	–	1	7	–	1	–	2
Furman	3	–	3	–	0	5	–	4	–	0
Wake Forest	3	–	3	–	0	7	–	3	–	0
NC State	2	–	4	–	0	2	–	8	–	0
Washington and Lee	1	–	2	–	0	3	–	4	–	1
South Carolina	1	–	3	–	0	3	–	6	–	1
VPI	1	–	4	–	1	4	–	5	–	1
Davidson	1	–	7	–	0	2	–	7	–	0
Maryland	0	–	1	–	0	2	–	7	–	0
The Citadel	0	–	4	–	0	3	–	8	–	0
$ – Conference champion; Rankings from AP Poll

1939 Southwest Conference football standings
	Conf.					Overall
Team	W		L		T	W		L		T
No. 1 Texas A&M $	6	–	0	–	0	11	–	0	–	0
Baylor	4	–	2	–	0	7	–	3	–	0
SMU	4	–	2	–	0	6	–	3	–	1
Texas	3	–	3	–	0	5	–	4	–	0
Arkansas	2	–	3	–	1	4	–	5	–	1
TCU	1	–	5	–	0	3	–	7	–	0
Rice	0	–	5	–	1	1	–	9	–	1
$ – Conference champion; Rankings from AP Poll

=== Independents ===
1939 Eastern college football independents records
	Conf.			Overall
Team	W	L	T	W		L		T
No. 4 Cornell		–		8	–	0	–	0
No. 10 Duquesne		–		8	–	0	–	1
Swarthmore		–		6	–	0	–	1
Scranton		–		7	–	0	–	2
Princeton		–		7	–	1	–	0
La Salle		–		6	–	1	–	1
Penn State		–		5	–	1	–	2
No. 11 Boston College		–		9	–	2	–	0
No. 17 Fordham		–		6	–	2	–	0
Villanova		–		6	–	2	–	0
Boston University		–		5	–	3	–	0
Brown		–		5	–	3	–	1
Dartmouth		–		5	–	3	–	1
Hofstra		–		4	–	3	–	0
NYU		–		5	–	4	–	0
Pittsburgh		–		5	–	4	–	0
Harvard		–		4	–	4	–	0
Manhattan		–		4	–	4	–	0
Penn		–		4	–	4	–	0
Syracuse		–		3	–	3	–	2
Vermont		–		3	–	3	–	2
Tufts		–		3	–	4	–	1
Yale		–		3	–	4	–	1
Army		–		3	–	4	–	2
Bucknell		–		3	–	5	–	0
Carnegie Tech		–		3	–	5	–	0
Providence		–		3	–	5	–	0
Columbia		–		2	–	4	–	2
Massachusetts State		–		2	–	5	–	2
Colgate		–		2	–	5	–	1
Temple		–		2	–	7	–	0
CCNY		–		1	–	7	–	0
Buffalo		–		0	–	7	–	0
Rankings from AP Poll

1939 Midwestern college football independents records
	Conf.			Overall
Team	W	L	T	W		L		T
Central Michigan		–		8	–	1	–	0
No. 13 Notre Dame		–		7	–	2	–	0
Michigan Tech		–		3	–	1	–	1
Ohio		–		6	–	3	–	0
Detroit		–		5	–	3	–	1
Akron		–		5	–	4	–	0
Cincinnati		–		4	–	3	–	2
Ohio Wesleyan		–		5	–	4	–	1
Marquette		–		4	–	4	–	0
Michigan State		–		4	–	4	–	1
Dayton		–		4	–	4	–	1
Michigan State Normal		–		3	–	3	–	1
Wayne		–		4	–	5	–	0
Xavier		–		3	–	5	–	1
Western State Teachers		–		2	–	6	–	1
Miami (OH)		–		1	–	7	–	1
Rankings from AP Poll

1939 Southern college football independents records
	Conf.			Overall
Team	W	L	T	W		L		T
Georgetown		–		7	–	0	–	1
Catholic University		–		8	–	1	–	1
Hardin–Simmons		–		7	–	1	–	1
George Washington		–		5	–	3	–	0
Virginia		–		5	–	4	–	0
Georgia Teachers		–		5	–	5	–	0
Oklahoma City		–		4	–	4	–	2
Roanoke		–		4	–	4	–	0
Delaware State		–		2	–	2	–	0
William & Mary Norfolk		–		4	–	5	–	0
Navy		–		3	–	5	–	1
West Virginia		–		2	–	6	–	1
Western Maryland		–		1	–	6	–	0
Delaware		–		1	–	7	–	0
East Carolina		–		0	–	8	–	0

1939 Western college football independents records
	Conf.			Overall
Team	W	L	T	W		L		T
San Diego Marines		–		11	–	0	–	0
No. T–14 Santa Clara		–		5	–	1	–	3
Gonzaga		–		6	–	2	–	0
Humboldt State		–		5	–	2	–	0
Idaho Southern Branch		–		5	–	2	–	0
Cal Poly		–		4	–	4	–	1
San Francisco		–		4	–	3	–	3
La Verne		–		3	–	3	–	0
Saint Mary's		–		3	–	4	–	1
Hawaii		–		3	–	6	–	0
Loyola (CA)		–		2	–	6	–	1
San Francisco State		–		2	–	4	–	2
Portland		–		1	–	5	–	1
Rankings from AP Poll

=== Minor conferences ===
Conference	Champion(s)	Record
Alamo Conference	Texas A&I; West Texas State Teachers	1–0–1
California Collegiate Athletic Association	San Jose State	3–0
Central Intercollegiate Athletics Association	Virginia State College	7–0–1
Central Intercollegiate Athletic Conference	Wichita	4–0–1
Far Western Conference	Nevada	3–0
Indiana Intercollegiate Conference	Butler	4–0
Iowa Intercollegiate Athletic Conference	Central (IA); Upper Iowa	5–2
Kansas Collegiate Athletic Conference	Ottawa (KS)	5–0–1
Lone Star Conference	North Texas State Teachers	4–0
Michigan Intercollegiate Athletic Association	Albion	6–0
Michigan-Ontario Collegiate Conference	DeSales (OH)	4–0
Midwest Collegiate Athletic Conference	Knox; Ripon	3–1–1
Minnesota Intercollegiate Athletic Conference	Saint Thomas (MN)	4–0–1
Missouri Intercollegiate Athletic Association	Northwest Missouri State Teachers	5–0
Nebraska College Athletic Conference	Hastings	3–0–1
Nebraska Intercollegiate Athletic Association	Nebraska State Normal	3–0
North Central Intercollegiate Athletic Conference	North Dakota; South Dakota; South Dakota State College	4–1
North Dakota College Athletic Conference	North Dakota Science	6–0
Northern Teachers Athletic Conference	Winona State Teachers	4–0
Ohio Athletic Conference	Muskingum	6–0
Oklahoma Collegiate Athletic Conference	Central State Teachers (OK)	5–1
Pacific Northwest Conference	Pacific (OR)	3–0–2
Pennsylvania State Athletic Conference	Slippery Rock State Teachers	5–0
South Dakota Intercollegiate Conference	Northern State Teachers	3–1–1
Southern California Intercollegiate Athletic Conference	Whittier	3–0–1
Southern Intercollegiate Athletic Conference	Alabama State College	5–1–2
Southwestern Athletic Conference	Langston	5–0–1
Texas Conference	Abilene Christian; St. Edward's (TX)	5–1
Washington Intercollegiate Conference	Eastern Washington College; Pacific Lutheran	2–0–1
Wisconsin State Teachers College Conference	North: La Crosse Teachers; South: Milwaukee State Teachers	3–1; 4–0

=== Minor conference standings ===
1939 Alabama Intercollegiate Conference football standings
	Conf.					Overall
Team	W		L		T	W		L		T
Troy State $	3	–	0	–	0	7	–	4	–	0
Snead	2	–	0	–	1	2	–	3	–	2
Marion	3	–	2	–	0	4	–	4	–	0
Livingston State	2	–	2	–	0	4	–	5	–	0
St. Bernard	0	–	3	–	0	2	–	4	–	0
Jacksonville State	0	–	3	–	1	0	–	8	–	2
$ – Conference champion

1939 Alamo Conference football standings
	Conf.					Overall
Team	W		L		T	W		L		T
Texas A&I +	2	–	0	–	1	6	–	1	–	3
West Texas State +	2	–	0	–	1	5	–	3	–	1
St. Mary's (TX)	1	–	2	–	0	5	–	4	–	2
Sul Ross	0	–	3	–	0	0	–	7	–	1
+ – Conference co-champions

1939 California Collegiate Athletic Association football standings
	Conf.					Overall
Team	W		L		T	W		L		T
San Jose State $	3	–	0	–	0	13	–	0	–	0
Fresno State	1	–	1	–	0	10	–	1	–	0
Santa Barbara State	1	–	2	–	0	5	–	4	–	1
San Diego State	0	–	2	–	0	2	–	7	–	0
$ – Conference champion

1939 Central Intercollegiate Conference football standings
	Conf.					Overall
Team	W		L		T	W		L		T
Wichita $	4	–	0	–	1	5	–	3	–	2
Emporia State	3	–	2	–	0	6	–	3	–	0
St. Benedict's	3	–	2	–	0	5	–	3	–	0
Pittsburg State	2	–	1	–	2	3	–	4	–	2
Fort Hays State	1	–	3	–	1	2	–	5	–	2
Southwestern (KS)	0	–	5	–	0	1	–	8	–	0
$ – Conference champion

1939 Colored Intercollegiate Athletic Association football standings
	Conf.					Overall
Team	W		L		T	W		L		T
Virginia State $	7	–	0	–	1	7	–	1	–	1
Bluefield State	4	–	1	–	3	4	–	1	–	4
Johnson C. Smith	4	–	2	–	0	7	–	2	–	0
Lincoln (PA)	4	–	1	–	1	6	–	1	–	1
North Carolina A&T	3	–	2	–	2	4	–	2	–	3
North Carolina College	4	–	3	–	0	5	–	4	–	0
Hampton	3	–	3	–	1	3	–	3	–	1
Morgan State	2	–	3	–	2	3	–	3	–	2
Virginia Union	3	–	4	–	0	5	–	4	–	0
Shaw	3	–	5	–	0	3	–	5	–	0
Saint Paul (VA)	2	–	6	–	0	2	–	6	–	0
Howard	0	–	6	–	0	1	–	7	–	0
St. Augustine's	0	–	3	–	0	1	–	3	–	1
$ – Conference champion; Conference standings were based on the Dickinson System. The Howard–Lincoln game was declared a no contest by the CIAA, and did not count in the conference standings.

1939 Dixie Conference football standings
	Conf.					Overall
Team	W		L		T	W		L		T
Southwestern (TN)	2	–	0	–	0	3	–	5	–	1
Loyola (LA) $	3	–	1	–	0	5	–	5	–	0
Mississippi College	3	–	1	–	1	6	–	1	–	1
Chattanooga	2	–	1	–	1	5	–	2	–	1
Millsaps	2	–	1	–	1	4	–	3	–	2
Birmingham–Southern	2	–	3	–	1	3	–	5	–	1
Howard (AL)	2	–	3	–	1	3	–	6	–	1
Mercer	1	–	3	–	0	3	–	7	–	0
Spring Hill	0	–	4	–	1	1	–	7	–	1
$ – Conference champion

1939 Eastern Pennsylvania Collegiate Conference football standings
	Conf.					Overall
Team	W		L		T	W		L		T
Gettysburg $	3	–	0	–	1	6	–	2	–	1
Muhlenberg	2	–	1	–	0	6	–	4	–	0
Franklin & Marshall	1	–	1	–	1	5	–	3	–	1
Drexel	0	–	1	–	1	3	–	5	–	1
Ursinus	0	–	3	–	1	2	–	5	–	1
$ – Conference champion

1939 Far Western Conference football standings
	Conf.					Overall
Team	W		L		T	W		L		T
Fresno State	2	–	0	–	0	10	–	1	–	1
Nevada $	3	–	1	–	0	5	–	4	–	0
Pacific (CA)	2	–	2	–	0	6	–	6	–	1
Chico State	1	–	2	–	0	2	–	4	–	2
Cal Aggies	0	–	3	–	0	4	–	4	–	0
$ – Conference champion; Fresno State was ineligible for the conference championship because they only played two league games.

1939 Illinois College Conference football standings
	Conf.					Overall
Team	W		L		T	W		L		T
Illinois Wesleyan $	2	–	0	–	0	4	–	4	–	0
Knox (IL)	2	–	0	–	1	6	–	1	–	1
Monmouth (IL)	1	–	0	–	1	6	–	2	–	2
Illinois College	1	–	0	–	1	6	–	1	–	1
Wheaton (IL)	1	–	0	–	1	2	–	4	–	2
Bradley	2	–	1	–	0	6	–	1	–	2
Lake Forest	2	–	2	–	0	5	–	2	–	0
Augustana (IL)	2	–	2	–	0	4	–	4	–	0
North Central	0	–	3	–	0	2	–	4	–	1
Millikin	0	–	5	–	0	2	–	6	–	0
$ – Conference champion

1939 Illinois Intercollegiate Athletic Conference football standings
	Conf.					Overall
Team	W		L		T	W		L		T
Western Illinois $	3	–	0	–	1	5	–	1	–	1
Illinois State Normal	3	–	0	–	2	4	–	2	–	3
Northern Illinois State	3	–	1	–	0	5	–	2	–	1
Carthage	2	–	1	–	0	2	–	6	–	1
Eastern Illinois	2	–	2	–	1	4	–	3	–	1
Elmhurst	1	–	4	–	0	1	–	6	–	1
Eureka	0	–	2	–	0	0	–	7	–	0
Southern Illinois	0	–	4	–	0	0	–	8	–	0
$ – Conference champion

1939 Indiana Intercollegiate Conference football standings
	Conf.					Overall
Team	W		L		T	W		L		T
Butler $	4	–	0	–	0	7	–	0	–	1
Ball State	5	–	1	–	0	6	–	2	–	0
Manchester	4	–	1	–	0	7	–	1	–	0
Rose Poly	3	–	1	–	1	5	–	3	–	1
Earlham	5	–	2	–	0	5	–	2	–	0
Saint Joseph's (IN)	2	–	1	–	0	4	–	3	–	0
DePauw	3	–	2	–	1	4	–	3	–	1
Hanover	3	–	3	–	0	4	–	4	–	0
Wabash	2	–	3	–	1	3	–	5	–	1
Central Normal	1	–	3	–	0	2	–	4	–	0
Valparaiso	1	–	3	–	0	2	–	6	–	0
Franklin (IN)	1	–	7	–	0	1	–	7	–	0
Evansville	0	–	4	–	1	1	–	6	–	1
Indiana State	0	–	3	–	0	2	–	6	–	0
$ – Conference champion

1939 Iowa Conference football standings
	Conf.					Overall
Team	W		L		T	W		L		T
Central (IA) +	5	–	2	–	0	7	–	2	–	0
Upper Iowa +	5	–	2	–	0	5	–	2	–	0
St. Ambrose	2	–	0	–	0	6	–	1	–	1
Dubuque	4	–	2	–	0	4	–	4	–	0
Iowa Wesleyan	3	–	2	–	1	5	–	3	–	1
Parsons	3	–	2	–	1	5	–	3	–	1
Loras	4	–	3	–	0	4	–	5	–	0
Western Union	2	–	2	–	0	6	–	2	–	1
Penn (IA)	2	–	2	–	2	3	–	3	–	2
Luther	2	–	3	–	0	3	–	5	–	0
Simpson (IA)	1	–	5	–	0	1	–	8	–	0
Buena Vista	0	–	4	–	1	1	–	5	–	1
Wartburg	0	–	4	–	1	0	–	5	–	1
+ – Conference co-champions

1939 Kansas Collegiate Athletic Conference football standings
	Conf.					Overall
Team	W		L		T	W		L		T
Ottawa $	5	–	0	–	1	6	–	1	–	1
Bethany (KS)	3	–	2	–	1	3	–	5	–	1
Baker	2	–	2	–	2	3	–	4	–	2
Kansas Wesleyan	2	–	2	–	2	2	–	3	–	4
College of Emporia	2	–	3	–	1	2	–	5	–	2
McPherson	1	–	3	–	2	4	–	3	–	2
Bethel (KS)	1	–	4	–	1	3	–	5	–	1
$ – Conference champion

1939 Lone Star Conference football standings
	Conf.					Overall
Team	W		L		T	W		L		T
North Texas State $	4	–	0	–	0	6	–	1	–	0
Sam Houston State	2	–	1	–	1	6	–	2	–	2
East Texas State	2	–	2	–	0	7	–	3	–	0
Stephen F. Austin	1	–	3	–	0	3	–	4	–	2
Southwest Texas State	0	–	3	–	1	3	–	5	–	2
$ – Conference champion

1939 Michigan Intercollegiate Athletic Association football standings
	Conf.					Overall
Team	W		L		T	W		L		T
Albion $	6	–	0	–	0	7	–	1	–	0
Hillsdale	5	–	1	–	0	6	–	1	–	0
Hope	3	–	2	–	1	4	–	2	–	2
Kalamazoo	3	–	3	–	0	3	–	5	–	0
Alma	2	–	3	–	1	2	–	5	–	1
Adrian	1	–	5	–	0	2	–	6	–	0
Olivet	0	–	6	–	0	1	–	7	–	0
$ – Conference champion

1939 Michigan-Ontario Collegiate Conference football standings
	Conf.					Overall
Team	W		L		T	W		L		T
DeSales (OH) $	4	–	0	–	0	6	–	0	–	0
Lawrence Tech	2	–	2	–	0	4	–	4	–	0
Ferris Institute	2	–	2	–	0	2	–	6	–	0
Assumption (ON)	2	–	2	–	0	?	–	?	–	?
St. Mary's (MI)	0	–	4	–	0	0	–	6	–	0
$ – Conference champion

1939 Middle Three Conference football standings
	Conf.					Overall
Team	W		L		T	W		L		T
Rutgers $	2	–	0	–	0	7	–	1	–	1
Lafayette	1	–	1	–	0	4	–	5	–	0
Lehigh	0	–	2	–	0	3	–	6	–	0
$ – Conference champion

1939 Midwest Athletic Association football standings
	Conf.					Overall
Team	W		L		T	W		L		T
Wilberforce $	4	–	1	–	0	5	–	2	–	0
Kentucky State	3	–	1	–	0	6	–	1	–	0
Lincoln (MO)	2	–	2	–	0	4	–	3	–	0
West Virginia State	2	–	2	–	0	2	–	3	–	1
Tennessee State	1	–	2	–	0	4	–	3	–	1
Louisville Municipal	0	–	4	–	0	1	–	4	–	0
$ – Conference champion

1939 Midwest Conference football standings
	Conf.					Overall
Team	W		L		T	W		L		T
Knox +	3	–	1	–	1	6	–	1	–	1
Ripon +	3	–	1	–	1	3	–	1	–	2
Cornell (IA)	4	–	2	–	0	7	–	2	–	0
Monmouth (IL)	2	–	2	–	2	6	–	2	–	2
Carleton	3	–	3	–	0	4	–	3	–	0
Beloit	2	–	3	–	1	4	–	3	–	1
Coe	2	–	3	–	1	2	–	5	–	2
Grinnell	2	–	3	–	0	3	–	5	–	1
Lawrence	1	–	4	–	0	2	–	5	–	0
+ – Conference co-champions

1939 Minnesota Intercollegiate Athletic Conference football standings
	Conf.					Overall
Team	W		L		T	W		L		T
St. Thomas (MN) $	4	–	0	–	1	6	–	1	–	1
Saint Mary's (MN)	4	–	1	–	0	5	–	2	–	0
Macalester	2	–	1	–	3	4	–	1	–	3
Gustavus Adolphus	3	–	2	–	0	6	–	2	–	0
Saint John's (MN)	3	–	2	–	0	5	–	2	–	0
St. Olaf	1	–	3	–	1	2	–	4	–	1
Concordia (MN)	0	–	3	–	2	2	–	4	–	2
Hamline	0	–	5	–	1	1	–	5	–	1
$ – Conference champion

1939 Missouri College Athletic Union football standings
	Conf.					Overall
Team	W		L		T	W		L		T
Missouri Valley +	3	–	1	–	0	7	–	1	–	0
Culver–Stockton +	3	–	1	–	0	4	–	4	–	0
William Jewell	2	–	2	–	0	3	–	5	–	0
Central (MO)	1	–	3	–	0	2	–	5	–	1
Tarkio	1	–	3	–	0	1	–	7	–	0
+ – Conference co-champions

1939 Missouri Intercollegiate Athletic Association football standings
	Conf.					Overall
Team	W		L		T	W		L		T
Maryville (MO) $	5	–	0	–	0	9	–	0	–	0
Springfield (MO)	3	–	1	–	1	7	–	1	–	1
Missouri Mines	3	–	2	–	0	5	–	4	–	0
Warrensburg	1	–	2	–	2	3	–	3	–	3
Cape Girardeau	1	–	3	–	1	5	–	3	–	1
Kirksville	0	–	5	–	0	2	–	6	–	0
$ – Conference champion

1939 Missouri Valley Conference football standings
	Conf.					Overall
Team	W		L		T	W		L		T
Washington University $	4	–	1	–	0	6	–	3	–	1
Oklahoma A&M	3	–	1	–	0	5	–	4	–	1
Tulsa	2	–	1	–	1	4	–	5	–	1
Drake	2	–	3	–	0	5	–	5	–	0
Saint Louis	1	–	2	–	1	5	–	3	–	2
Creighton	2	–	4	–	0	4	–	5	–	0
Washburn	1	–	3	–	0	6	–	4	–	0
$ – Conference champion

1939 Montana Collegiate Conference football standings
	Conf.					Overall
Team	W		L		T	W		L		T
Montana Mines $	3	–	0	–	0	3	–	2	–	0
Carroll (MT)	2	–	1	–	0	3	–	4	–	0
Billings Polytechnic	1	–	2	–	0	2	–	3	–	0
Montana Normal	0	–	3	–	0	?	–	?	–	?
$ – Conference champion

1939 Nebraska College Athletic Conference football standings
	Conf.					Overall
Team	W		L		T	W		L		T
Hastings *	3	–	0	–	1	6	–	3	–	1
Midland	2	–	0	–	2	4	–	1	–	4
Doane	2	–	2	–	0	4	–	4	–	0
Nebraska Wesleyan	1	–	3	–	0	2	–	7	–	0
York (NE)	0	–	3	–	1	2	–	4	–	3
* The conference title was declared vacant after the season because Hastings used an ineligible player.

1939 Nebraska Intercollegiate Athletic Association football standings
	Conf.					Overall
Team	W		L		T	W		L		T
Peru State $	3	–	0	–	0	7	–	1	–	1
Chadron State	2	–	1	–	0	4	–	3	–	1
Wayne State (NE)	1	–	2	–	0	3	–	5	–	1
Kearney State	0	–	3	–	0	3	–	6	–	0
$ – Conference champion

1939 New England Conference football standings
	Conf.					Overall
Team	W		L		T	W		L		T
Maine $	3	–	0	–	0	5	–	2	–	0
Connecticut	1	–	1	–	0	5	–	3	–	0
New Hampshire	1	–	1	–	0	3	–	5	–	0
Rhode Island State	1	–	2	–	0	3	–	4	–	1
Northeastern	0	–	2	–	0	0	–	6	–	1
$ – Conference champion

1939 North Central Conference football standings
	Conf.					Overall
Team	W		L		T	W		L		T
South Dakota State +	4	–	1	–	0	7	–	2	–	0
North Dakota +	4	–	1	–	0	5	–	3	–	0
South Dakota +	4	–	1	–	0	4	–	5	–	0
Iowa State Teachers	3	–	1	–	0	5	–	3	–	1
Omaha	1	–	3	–	0	3	–	5	–	0
Morningside	1	–	5	–	0	2	–	6	–	0
North Dakota Agricultural	0	–	5	–	0	1	–	6	–	1
+ – Conference co-champions

1939 North Dakota Intercollegiate Conference football standings
	Conf.					Overall
Team	W		L		T	W		L		T
Wahpeton $	6	–	0	–	0	6	–	1	–	0
Ellendale	5	–	1	–	0	5	–	2	–	0
Mayville State	5	–	2	–	0	5	–	3	–	0
Valley City State	2	–	4	–	0	2	–	5	–	0
Jamestown	1	–	3	–	1	2	–	5	–	1
Dickinson State	1	–	3	–	1	1	–	4	–	1
Bottineau	0	–	3	–	2	?	–	?	–	?
Minot State	0	–	4	–	2	0	–	6	–	2
$ – Conference champion

1939 North State Conference football standings
	Conf.					Overall
Team	W		L		T	W		L		T
Appalachian State +	3	–	0	–	1	7	–	1	–	2
Lenoir Rhyne +	4	–	0	–	2	6	–	1	–	3
Elon	4	–	2	–	0	5	–	5	–	0
Catawba	2	–	1	–	1	6	–	2	–	2
High Point	2	–	4	–	0	4	–	6	–	0
Western Carolina	0	–	4	–	1	1	–	6	–	1
Guilford	0	–	4	–	1	1	–	7	–	1
+ – Conference co-champions

1939 Northern Teachers College Conference football standings
	Conf.					Overall
Team	W		L		T	W		L		T
Winona State $	4	–	0	–	0	7	–	1	–	0
Duluth State	3	–	1	–	0	5	–	1	–	1
Moorhead State	3	–	1	–	0	4	–	3	–	1
Bemidji State	1	–	3	–	1	3	–	3	–	1
Mankato State	0	–	2	–	2	0	–	4	–	2
St. Cloud State	0	–	4	–	1	2	–	5	–	1
$ – Conference champion

1939 Northwest Conference football standings
	Conf.					Overall
Team	W		L		T	W		L		T
Pacific (OR) $	3	–	0	–	2	3	–	2	–	2
Willamette	3	–	1	–	1	3	–	4	–	2
Whitman	3	–	2	–	0	4	–	3	–	0
Linfield	2	–	3	–	0	2	–	7	–	0
Puget Sound	1	–	3	–	0	1	–	5	–	1
College of Idaho	0	–	3	–	1	4	–	4	–	1
$ – Conference champion

1939 Ohio Athletic Conference football standings
	Conf.					Overall
Team	W		L		T	W		L		T
Muskingum $	7	–	0	–	0	8	–	1	–	0
Toledo	1	–	0	–	0	7	–	3	–	0
Capital	5	–	1	–	0	5	–	2	–	0
Case	3	–	1	–	0	6	–	2	–	0
Bowling Green	3	–	1	–	1	6	–	1	–	1
Findlay	3	–	1	–	1	4	–	2	–	1
Denison	5	–	2	–	0	6	–	2	–	0
John Carroll	2	–	1	–	0	7	–	1	–	0
Wittenberg	4	–	2	–	0	5	–	3	–	0
Ohio Northern	5	–	3	–	0	5	–	3	–	0
Marietta	2	–	3	–	0	4	–	3	–	0
Mount Union	2	–	3	–	1	3	–	5	–	1
Wooster	2	–	4	–	0	2	–	6	–	0
Baldwin–Wallace	1	–	2	–	0	6	–	2	–	0
Heidelberg	2	–	5	–	0	1	–	8	–	0
Ashland	1	–	3	–	0	2	–	4	–	0
Kent State	1	–	3	–	1	3	–	4	–	1
Oberlin	0	–	3	–	0	3	–	4	–	1
Kenyon	0	–	3	–	0	0	–	6	–	1
Otterbein	0	–	7	–	0	0	–	8	–	0
$ – Conference champion

1939 Oklahoma Collegiate Conference football standings
	Conf.					Overall
Team	W		L		T	W		L		T
Central State (OK) $	5	–	1	–	0	5	–	3	–	0
Oklahoma Baptist	4	–	2	–	0	8	–	2	–	0
East Central	4	–	2	–	0	7	–	2	–	0
SE Oklahoma State	3	–	2	–	1	5	–	5	–	1
SW Oklahoma State	2	–	3	–	1	2	–	5	–	3
NW Oklahoma State	1	–	5	–	0	2	–	6	–	0
Northeastern State	1	–	5	–	0	2	–	7	–	0
$ – Conference champion

1939 Pennsylvania State Teachers Conference football standings
	Conf.					Overall
Team	W		L		T	W		L		T
Slippery Rock $	5	–	0	–	0	8	–	0	–	0
West Chester	3	–	0	–	0	3	–	3	–	3
Clarion	2	–	0	–	1	5	–	1	–	1
Lock Haven	5	–	1	–	0	5	–	4	–	0
Indiana (PA)	4	–	2	–	2	4	–	2	–	2
Mansfield	3	–	2	–	0	4	–	3	–	0
East Stroudsburg	3	–	2	–	0	3	–	5	–	0
Shippensburg	3	–	3	–	1	3	–	3	–	1
Kutztown	2	–	3	–	0	5	–	3	–	0
California (PA)	1	–	3	–	0	1	–	7	–	0
Millersville	1	–	4	–	0	2	–	5	–	0
Edinboro	0	–	5	–	0	1	–	6	–	0
Bloomsburg	0	–	7	–	0	0	–	8	–	0
$ – Conference champion

1939 Rocky Mountain Conference football standings
	Conf.					Overall
Team	W		L		T	W		L		T
Colorado Mines $	4	–	0	–	0	8	–	0	–	0
Colorado State–Greeley	3	–	1	–	0	4	–	4	–	0
Western State (CO)	1	–	2	–	0	2	–	5	–	1
Montana State	0	–	2	–	0	2	–	7	–	0
Colorado College	0	–	3	–	0	2	–	5	–	1
$ – Conference champion

1939 Smoky Mountain Conference football standings
	Conf.					Overall
Team	W		L		T	W		L		T
Carson–Newman $	4	–	1	–	2	4	–	3	–	2
Milligan	4	–	2	–	0	6	–	3	–	0
East Tennessee State Teachers	4	–	2	–	0	5	–	3	–	0
Maryville (TN)	2	–	3	–	1	4	–	5	–	1
Cumberland (TN)	1	–	5	–	0	2	–	7	–	0
Tusculum	0	–	5	–	0	0	–	7	–	1
Appalachian State *	2	–	0	–	0	7	–	1	–	2
King *	3	–	2	–	1	7	–	3	–	1
$ – Conference champion; * Appalachian State and King were ruled ineligible for conference competition.

1939 South Dakota Intercollegiate Conference football standings
	Conf.					Overall
Team	W		L		T	W		L		T
Augustana (SD) $	5	–	0	–	0	6	–	2	–	0
Northern State	3	–	1	–	1	5	–	1	–	1
Yankton	3	–	1	–	1	4	–	3	–	1
Huron	3	–	3	–	0	4	–	4	–	0
South Dakota Mines	2	–	2	–	0	3	–	4	–	0
Dakota Wesleyan	2	–	3	–	0	2	–	5	–	0
Sioux Falls	2	–	3	–	0	2	–	6	–	0
Spearfish	1	–	3	–	0	3	–	4	–	0
Southern Normal	1	–	4	–	0	2	–	5	–	0
Eastern Normal	0	–	2	–	0	0	–	4	–	1
$ – Conference champion

1939 Southern California Conference football standings
	Conf.					Overall
Team	W		L		T	W		L		T
Whittier $	3	–	0	–	1	8	–	2	–	1
Pomona	2	–	1	–	1	4	–	3	–	1
Occidental	2	–	2	–	0	3	–	5	–	0
Redlands	2	–	2	–	0	3	–	7	–	0
Caltech	0	–	4	–	0	2	–	6	–	0
$ – Conference champion

1939 Southern Intercollegiate Athletic Association football standings
	Conf.					Overall
Team	W		L		T	W		L		T
Louisiana Normal $	7	–	0	–	0	11	–	0	–	0
Tennessee Tech	4	–	0	–	0	6	–	3	–	1
Mississippi College	3	–	0	–	0	6	–	1	–	1
Miami (FL)	2	–	0	–	0	5	–	5	–	0
Rollins	5	–	1	–	0	10	–	1	–	0
Western Kentucky State Teachers	5	–	1	–	1	7	–	1	–	1
Mississippi State Teachers	4	–	1	–	0	4	–	2	–	3
Murray State	4	–	1	–	1	4	–	4	–	1
Newberry	3	–	1	–	1	4	–	1	–	4
Presbyterian	3	–	1	–	2	4	–	3	–	2
Georgetown (KY)	2	–	1	–	1	4	–	4	–	1
Eastern Kentucky	3	–	2	–	0	6	–	3	–	0
Union (TN)	3	–	2	–	0	7	–	2	–	0
Morehead State	2	–	2	–	0	6	–	2	–	0
Louisville	1	–	1	–	1	5	–	2	–	1
Union (KY)	1	–	1	–	1	3	–	3	–	1
Oglethorpe	3	–	3	–	1	3	–	4	–	1
Centre	1	–	1	–	1	1	–	5	–	2
Centenary	1	–	1	–	0	2	–	9	–	1
Louisiana Tech	3	–	4	–	0	5	–	6	–	0
West Tennessee State Teachers	3	–	4	–	0	3	–	8	–	0
Troy State	2	–	3	–	0	7	–	4	–	0
SW Louisiana	2	–	3	–	0	3	–	5	–	1
Stetson	2	–	4	–	2	3	–	5	–	2
Louisiana College	2	–	5	–	0	4	–	6	–	1
Middle Tennessee State Teachers	1	–	5	–	1	1	–	6	–	1
Erskine	1	–	5	–	0	1	–	9	–	0
Delta State	1	–	6	–	0	1	–	9	–	0
Wofford	0	–	2	–	3	1	–	5	–	3
Tampa	0	–	3	–	1	2	–	7	–	1
Jacksonville State	0	–	3	–	1	0	–	8	–	2
Transylvania	0	–	7	–	0	1	–	8	–	0
Emory and Henry	0	–	0	–	0	7	–	2	–	0
$ – Conference champion

1939 Southern Intercollegiate Athletic Conference football standings
	Conf.					Overall
Team	W		L		T	W		L		T
Alabama State $	5	–	1	–	2	6	–	2	–	2
Florida A&M	5	–	2	–	0	7	–	2	–	1
Xavier (LA)	4	–	2	–	0	5	–	5	–	0
Lane	2	–	2	–	1	4	–	3	–	1
Morris Brown	5	–	2	–	2	7	–	2	–	2
Morehouse	3	–	2	–	1	4	–	3	–	1
Tuskegee	2	–	6	–	0	3	–	7	–	0
South Carolina State	3	–	3	–	1	4	–	3	–	1
Knoxville	3	–	4	–	1	4	–	4	–	1
Clark (GA)	2	–	4	–	0	3	–	4	–	0
Fisk	0	–	5	–	0	0	–	7	–	0
Benedict	2	–	1	–	0	5	–	2	–	1
LeMoyne	2	–	3	–	0	3	–	4	–	1
Talladega	1	–	2	–	0	1	–	3	–	1
$ – Conference champion; Standings were based on Dickinson System ratings. Benedict, LeMoyne, and Talladega were not rated.

1939 Southwestern Athletic Conference football standings
	Conf.					Overall
Team	W		L		T	W		L		T
Langston $	5	–	0	–	1	7	–	0	–	1
Prairie View	3	–	2	–	1	5	–	2	–	1
Arkansas AM&N	3	–	2	–	1	6	–	3	–	1
Bishop	2	–	2	–	2	3	–	2	–	2
Wiley	3	–	3	–	0	6	–	5	–	0
Southern	1	–	4	–	1	4	–	5	–	1
Texas College	1	–	5	–	0	1	–	6	–	1
$ – Conference champion

1939 Texas Conference football standings
	Conf.					Overall
Team	W		L		T	W		L		T
Abilene Christian +	5	–	1	–	0	6	–	2	–	1
St. Edward's +	5	–	1	–	0	6	–	3	–	0
Trinity (TX)	4	–	1	–	2	6	–	3	–	2
Howard Payne	4	–	2	–	1	5	–	4	–	1
Texas Wesleyan	2	–	2	–	1	4	–	5	–	2
Southwestern (TX)	3	–	3	–	0	3	–	5	–	0
Daniel Baker	3	–	4	–	0	4	–	6	–	0
McMurry	1	–	6	–	0	1	–	6	–	0
Austin	0	–	7	–	0	0	–	10	–	0
+ – Conference co-champions

1939 Washington Intercollegiate Conference football standings
	Conf.					Overall
Team	W		L		T	W		L		T
Pacific Lutheran +	2	–	1	–	0	7	–	1	–	0
Eastern Washington +	2	–	1	–	0	5	–	3	–	0
Central Washington	1	–	2	–	0	5	–	2	–	0
Western Washington	1	–	2	–	0	5	–	2	–	0
+ – Conference co-champions

1939 West Virginia Intercollegiate Athletic Conference football standings
	Conf.					Overall
Team	W		L		T	W		L		T
West Liberty State $	5	–	0	–	0	8	–	2	–	0
Glenville State	6	–	2	–	1	6	–	2	–	1
Concord	3	–	1	–	1	4	–	4	–	1
Morris Harvey	2	–	2	–	1	5	–	3	–	1
New River State	2	–	3	–	0	0	–	3	–	4
Potomac State	1	–	3	–	0	2	–	5	–	1
West Virginia Wesleyan	1	–	3	–	0	1	–	8	–	0
Salem	1	–	5	–	2	1	–	6	–	2
Fairmont State	1	–	5	–	0	2	–	6	–	0
Shepherd	0	–	4	–	0	1	–	6	–	0
Marshall *	3	–	0	–	0	9	–	2	–	0
Davis & Elkins *	3	–	0	–	0	5	–	4	–	1
Bethany (WV) *	1	–	1	–	1	3	–	3	–	1
$ – Conference champion; * – Did not qualify for conference standings Ties did not count in conference standings.

1939 Wisconsin State Teachers College Conference football standings
	Conf.					Overall
Team	W		L		T	W		L		T
Northern Division
La Crosse State x	3	–	1	–	0	3	–	4	–	0
Superior State	2	–	1	–	1	5	–	1	–	2
Eau Claire State	2	–	2	–	0	2	–	5	–	0
Stout Institute	1	–	2	–	1	1	–	5	–	1
River Falls State	1	–	3	–	0	3	–	4	–	0
Southern Division
Milwaukee State x	4	–	0	–	0	5	–	1	–	1
Whitewater State	3	–	1	–	0	5	–	1	–	0
Platteville State	2	–	2	–	0	4	–	2	–	0
Stevens Point State	1	–	3	–	0	2	–	6	–	0
Oshkosh State	0	–	4	–	0	1	–	5	–	0
x – Division champion/co-champions

== Heisman Trophy voting ==
The Heisman Trophy is given to the year's most outstanding player

Player	School	Position	Total
Nile Kinnick	Iowa	HB	651
Tom Harmon	Michigan	HB	405
Paul Christman	Missouri	QB	391
George Cafego	Tennessee	HB	296

== Bowl games ==
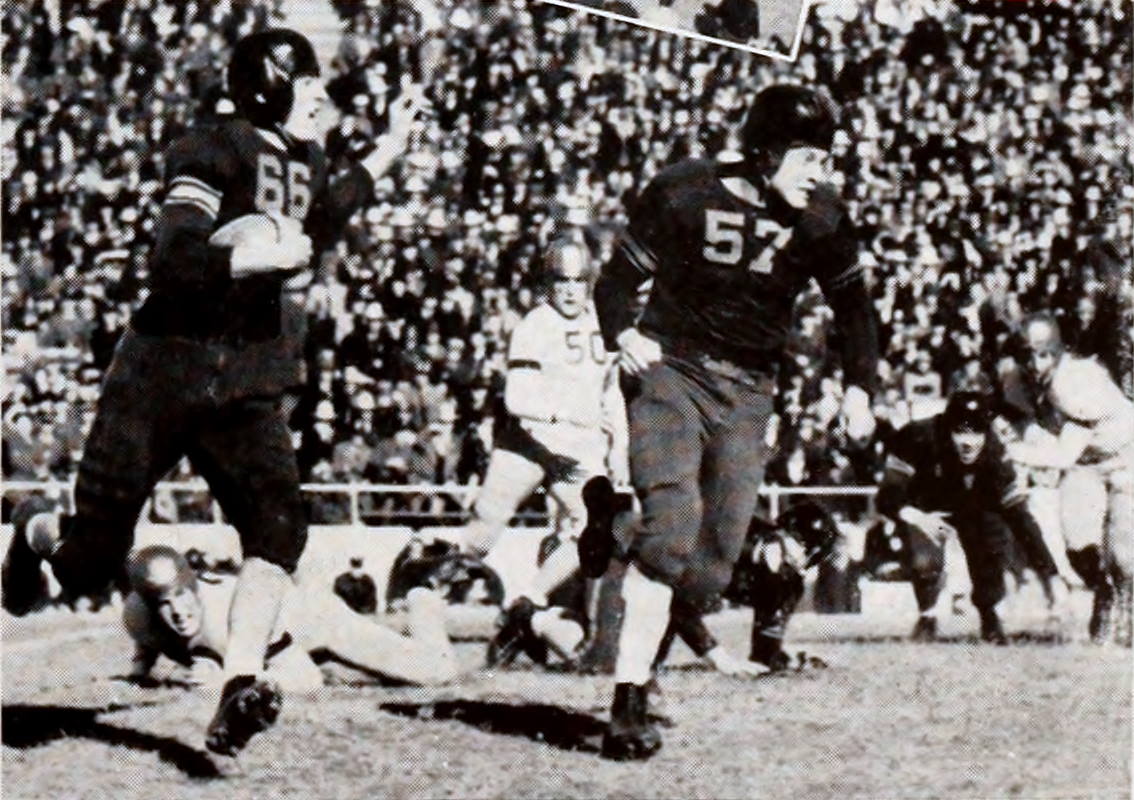
Cotton Bowl

Bowl game	Winning team		Losing team	
Rose Bowl	No. 3 USC	14	No. 2 Tennessee	0
Sugar Bowl	No. 1 Texas A&M	14	No. 5 Tulane	13
Orange Bowl	No. 16 Georgia Tech	21	No. 6 Missouri	7
Cotton Bowl Classic	No. 12 Clemson	6	No. 11 Boston College	3
Sun Bowl	Arizona State	0	Catholic University	0

== See also ==
- 1939 College Football All-America Team
