= 1939 Texas Longhorns football team =

American college football season

1939 Texas Longhorns football
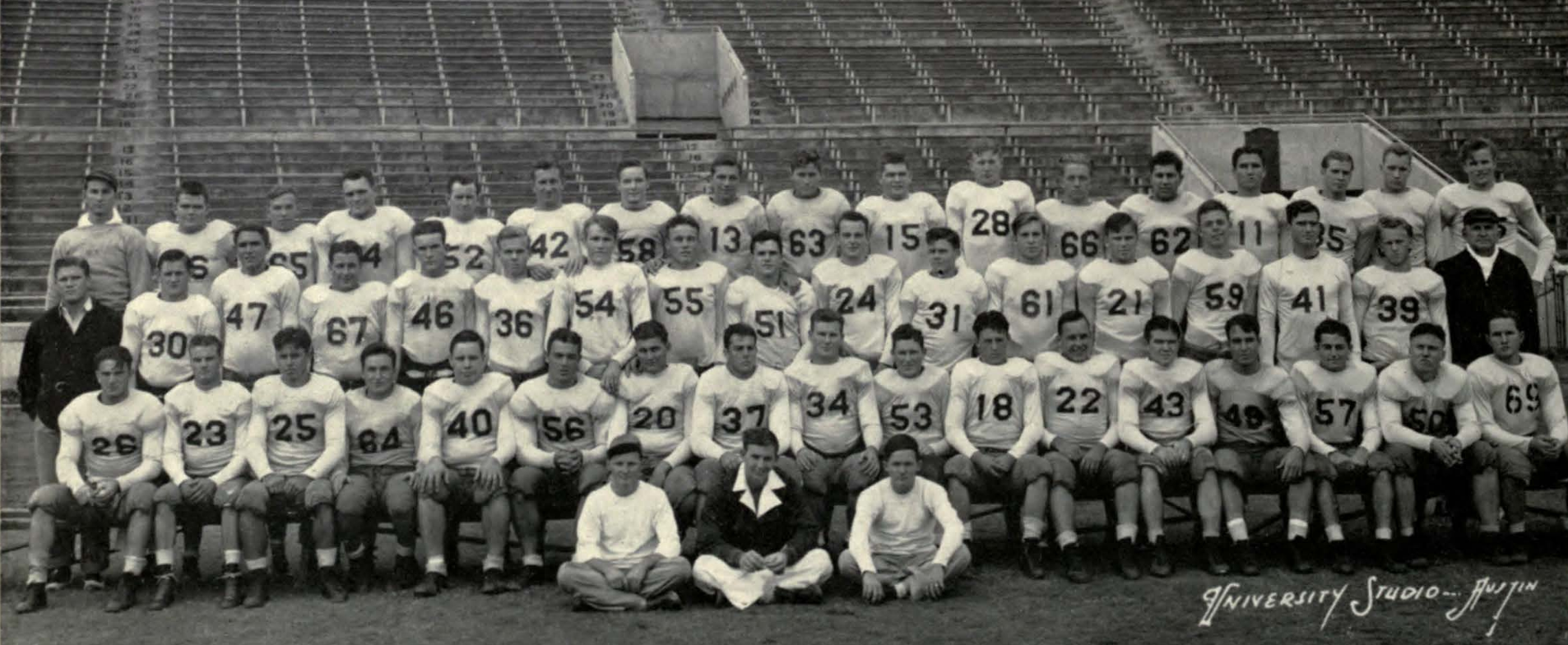
- Conference: Southwest Conference
- Record: 5–4 (3–3 SWC)
- Head coach: Dana X. Bible (3rd season)
- Captains: Ned McDonald; Park Myers
- Home stadium: War Memorial Stadium

1939 Southwest Conference football standings
	Conf.					Overall
Team	W		L		T	W		L		T
No. 1 Texas A&M $	6	–	0	–	0	11	–	0	–	0
Baylor	4	–	2	–	0	7	–	3	–	0
SMU	4	–	2	–	0	6	–	3	–	1
Texas	3	–	3	–	0	5	–	4	–	0
Arkansas	2	–	3	–	1	4	–	5	–	1
TCU	1	–	5	–	0	3	–	7	–	0
Rice	0	–	5	–	1	1	–	9	–	1
$ – Conference champion; Rankings from AP Poll

The 1939 Texas Longhorns football team was an American football team that represented the University of Texas (now known as the University of Texas at Austin) as a member of the Southwest Conference (SWC) during the 1939 college football season. In their third year under head coach Dana X. Bible, the Longhorns compiled an overall record of 5–4, with a mark of 3–3 in conference play, and finished fourth in the SWC.

Texas was not ranked in the final AP Poll, but was ranked at No. 48 in the 1939 Williamson System ratings, and at No. 43 in the final Litkenhous Ratings.

== Schedule ==
Date	Opponent	Site	Result	Attendance	Source
September 30	Florida*	War Memorial Stadium; Austin, TX	W 12–0	17,000	
October 7	at Wisconsin*	Camp Randall Stadium; Madison, WI	W 17–7	25,000	
October 14	vs. No. 3 Oklahoma*	Cotton Bowl; Dallas, TX (rivalry)	L 12–24	28,000	
October 21	Arkansas	War Memorial Stadium; Austin, TX (rivalry)	W 14–13	16,000	
October 28	Rice	War Memorial Stadium; Austin, TX (rivalry)	W 26–12		
November 4	at No. 16 SMU	Ownby Stadium; University Park, TX	L 0–10	23,000	
November 11	at Baylor	Municipal Stadium; Waco, TX (rivalry)	L 0–20		
November 18	TCU	War Memorial Stadium; Austin, TX (rivalry)	W 25–19	20,000	
November 30	at No. 1 Texas A&M	Kyle Field; College Station, TX (rivalry)	L 0–20	40,000	
*Non-conference game; Rankings from AP Poll released prior to the game

== Season summary ==
=== Arkansas (The Renaissance Game) ===
Week 4: Arkansas at Texas

Team	1	2	3	4	Total
Arkansas	6	0	0	7	13
• Texas	7	0	0	7	14

- Date: October 21
- Location: Austin, TX
- Game attendance: 16,000
- Referee: Harry Viner (Missouri)

Scoring summary
Q1	AR	Kay Eakin 8-yard run (Kick failed)	ARK 7–0
Q1	UT	R.B. Patrick run (Crain Kick)	TEX 7–6
Q4	AR	Kay Eakin 1-yard run (Simington Kick)	ARK 13–7
Q4	UT	Jack Crain 67-yard pass from ??? (Crain Kick)	TEX 14–13

On October 21, 1939, the Texas Longhorns and Arkansas Razorbacks met at War Memorial Stadium, the game was the start of conference play for Texas. Arkansas jumped out to an early lead after a series of passes and quick runs that brought them to the Texas 8 yard-line. One play later QB Gloyd Lyon lateraled the ball to Left Halfback Kay Eakin, who evaded multiple Horns and crossed over the end zone for a touchdown. Walter Hamberg missed the extra point attempt and the score stood 6-0 Arkansas. At some point in the first quarter following a Jack Crain quick kick, Texas' R.B. Patrick responded with the Longhorns first touchdown of the game, Crain kicked the extra point and Texas took the lead 7-6.

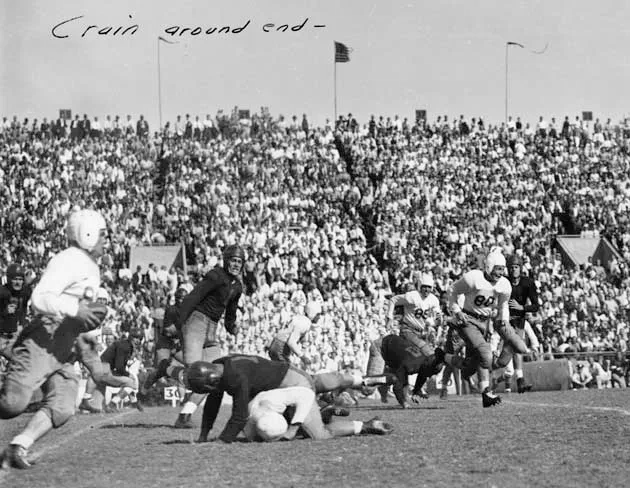
Jack Crain scoring the walk-off touchdown.

Arkansas held Texas' to a standstill for most of the game but not due to the Horns lack of energy. The game was hard-fought and every Razorback drive was "earned the hard way." Early in the fourth quarter Arkansas marched down the field following an unnecessary roughness penalty against Texas, Eakin faked a pass and sprinted towards the end zone but was downed at the Texas 10. On the next play substitute Ralph Atwood swept past the end and was downed at the 1. Subsequently Eakin "plunged, fought, and finally scrambled" his way into the end zone to retake the lead 13-7 after Milton Simington kicked the extra point. On Texas' next possession they found themselves deep within their own territory and with only :30 seconds left on the clock. Crain, a relatively unknown sophomore at the time, ran an out route and caught a dump-off pass before breaking loose for a 67 yard touchdown to tie the game, following this Crain himself kicked the game-winning extra point to take back the lead 14-13. 16,000 Frenzied Longhorns fans prematurely rushed the field to celebrate the victory but there was still time left on the clock. After officials cleared the field Arkansas received the kick and only had time for one play, which was smeared.

John Crain's miraculous last second touchdown earned him the nickname of "Jackrabbit" and sealed his name in Longhorn History books. The play has also been credited with helping save the football program at the university. After an abysmal 1-8 season in 1938 where the only win was an upset over A&M the future did not seem bright for Texas football. But the come-from-behind victory has since been referred to as “The Renaissance Game,” as it represented the start of a new era in Texas football. This was the Longhorns first winning season since 1934 and they wouldn't lose another until 1954.
