= 1939 TCU Horned Frogs football team =

American college football season

1939 TCU Horned Frogs football
- Conference: Southwest Conference
- Record: 3–7 (1–5 SWC)
- Head coach: Dutch Meyer (6th season)
- Offensive scheme: Meyer spread
- Home stadium: Amon G. Carter Stadium

1939 Southwest Conference football standings
| | Conf. | | | | | Overall |
| Team | W | | L | | T | W | | L | | T |
|---|---|---|---|---|---|---|---|---|---|---|
| No. 1 Texas A&M $ | 6 | – | 0 | – | 0 | 11 | – | 0 | – | 0 |
| Baylor | 4 | – | 2 | – | 0 | 7 | – | 3 | – | 0 |
| SMU | 4 | – | 2 | – | 0 | 6 | – | 3 | – | 1 |
| Texas | 3 | – | 3 | – | 0 | 5 | – | 4 | – | 0 |
| Arkansas | 2 | – | 3 | – | 1 | 4 | – | 5 | – | 1 |
| TCU | 1 | – | 5 | – | 0 | 3 | – | 7 | – | 0 |
| Rice | 0 | – | 5 | – | 1 | 1 | – | 9 | – | 1 |
$ – Conference champion; Rankings from AP Poll

The 1939 TCU Horned Frogs football team represented Texas Christian University (TCU) in the 1939 college football season. The team was coached by Dutch Meyer in his sixth year as head coach, finishing the season with a 3–7 record after winning the national championship the season before. The team scored 11.6 points per game while the defense allowed 11.9 points per game.

TCU was ranked at No. 47 (out of 609 teams) in the final Litkenhous Ratings for 1939.

The Horned Frogs played their home games in Amon G. Carter Stadium, which is located on campus in Fort Worth, Texas.

== Schedule ==
| Date | Opponent | Site | Result | Attendance | Source |
|---|---|---|---|---|---|
| September 29 | at UCLA* | Los Angeles Memorial Coliseum; Los Angeles, CA | L 2–6 | 60,000 | |
| October 7 | at Arkansas | Bailey Stadium; Fayetteville, AR | L 13–14 | | |
| October 14 | at Temple | Temple Stadium; Philadelphia, PA | L 11–13 | 20,000 | |
| October 21 | No. 9 Texas A&M | Amon G. Carter Stadium; Fort Worth, TX (rivalry) | L 6–20 | 25,000 | |
| October 28 | at Centenary* | Centenary College Stadium; Shreveport, LA | W 21–0 | | |
| November 4 | at Baylor | Waco Stadium; Waco, TX (rivalry) | L 0–27 | 7,000 | |
| November 11 | Tulsa* | Amon G. Carter Stadium; Fort Worth, TX | W 16–0 | 5,000 | |
| November 18 | at Texas | War Memorial Stadium; Austin, TX (rivalry) | L 19–25 | 20,000 | |
| November 25 | Rice | Amon G. Carter Stadium; Fort Worth, TX | W 21–0 | | |
| December 2 | at SMU | Amon G. Carter Stadium; Fort Worth, TX (rivalry) | L 7–14 | 18,000 | |
*Non-conference game; Rankings from AP Poll released prior to the game
