= 1939 Texas Tech Red Raiders football team =

American college football season

1939 Texas Tech Red Raiders football
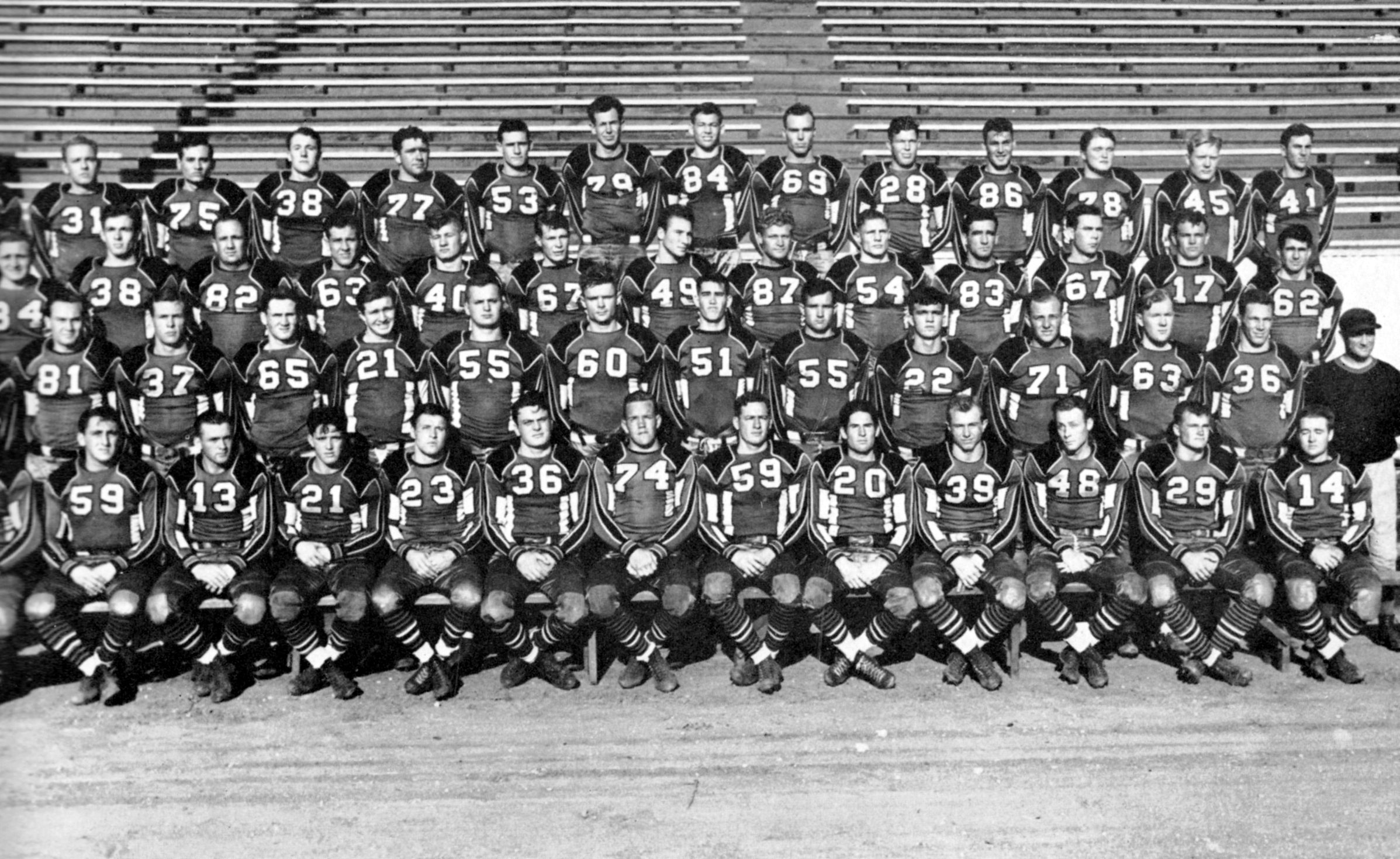
- 1939 Texas Tech football team
- Conference: Border Conference
- Record: 5–5–1 (2–1 Border)
- Head coach: Pete Cawthon (10th season)
- Offensive scheme: Single-wing
- Base defense: 6–2
- Home stadium: Tech Field

1939 Border Conference football standings
	Conf.					Overall
Team	W		L		T	W		L		T
Arizona State $	4	–	0	–	0	8	–	2	–	1
New Mexico	4	–	2	–	0	8	–	2	–	0
Texas Tech	2	–	1	–	0	5	–	5	–	1
Texas Mines	3	–	2	–	0	5	–	4	–	0
Arizona	1	–	2	–	0	6	–	4	–	0
New Mexico A&M	1	–	4	–	0	3	–	6	–	0
Arizona State–Flagstaff	0	–	4	–	0	1	–	6	–	1
$ – Conference champion

The 1939 Texas Tech Red Raiders football team represented Texas Technological College—now known as Texas Tech University—as a member of the Border Conference during the 1939 college football season. Led by tenth-year head coach Pete Cawthon, the Red Raiders compiled an overall record of 5–5–1 with a mark of 2–1 in conference play, placing third in the Border Conference. The team outscored its opponents by a total of 150 to 74 on the season. Texas Tech played home games at Tech Field in Lubbock, Texas.

On November 11, Texas Tech played Centenary to a scoreless tie in a game in which the two teams combined for an NCAA-record 77 punts.

Texas Tech was ranked at No. 90 (out of 609 teams) in the final Litkenhous Ratings for 1939.

== Schedule ==
Date	Time	Opponent	Site	Result	Attendance	Source
September 23		at Texas Mines	Kidd Field; El Paso, TX	L 2–7		
September 30		Texas Wesleyan*	Tech Field; Lubbock, TX	W 33–0	7,000	
October 7		Gonzaga*	Tech Field; Lubbock, TX	L 0–6		
October 14		Arizona State–Flagstaff	Tech Field; Lubbock, TX	W 54–0		
October 21		New Mexico	Tech Field; Lubbock, TX	W 19–7	9,000	
October 27		at No. 11 Duquesne*	Forbes Field; Pittsburgh, PA	L 0–13	11,061	
November 3	7:15 p.m.	at Miami (FL)*	Burdine Stadium; Miami, FL	L 0–19	11,337	
November 11		at Centenary*	Centenary College Stadium; Shreveport, LA	T 0–0		
November 18		Marquette*^{†}	Tech Field; Lubbock, TX	L 19–22	8,000	
November 25		Montana*	Tech Field; Lubbock, TX	W 13–0	3,000	
December 1		at Loyola (LA)*	Loyola University Stadium; New Orleans, LA	W 13–0	3,500	
*Non-conference game; ^{†}Homecoming; Rankings from AP Poll released prior to the game; All times are in Central time

== Game summaries ==
=== At Centenary ===
Texas Tech Red Raiders at Centenary Gentlemen – Game summary

Quarter	1	2	3	4	Total
Red Raiders	0	0	0	0	0
Gentlemen	0	0	0	0	0

at Centenary College Stadium, Shreveport, LA

- Date: November 11
- Game weather: Heavy rain

The game was played in a torrential downpour that led to muddy field conditions that prevented either team from effectively running or passing the ball. To cope with the poor conditions, the teams resorted to punting in hopes of recovering a turnover on the other end of the field. Both teams combined for 77 punts (39 for Texas Tech and 38 for Centenary), with 67 occurring on first down. 42 punts were returned, 19 went out of bounds, 10 were downed, 1 went into the end zone for a touchback, 4 were blocked, and 1 was fair caught. The Gentlemen managed to finish with 31 yards of total offense, while the Red Raiders finished with a one-yard loss. Texas Tech punter Charlie Calhoun punted the ball 36 times for 1,318 yards, both of which still stand as NCAA records.
