= Floyd Casey Stadium =

Former football stadium in Waco, Texas

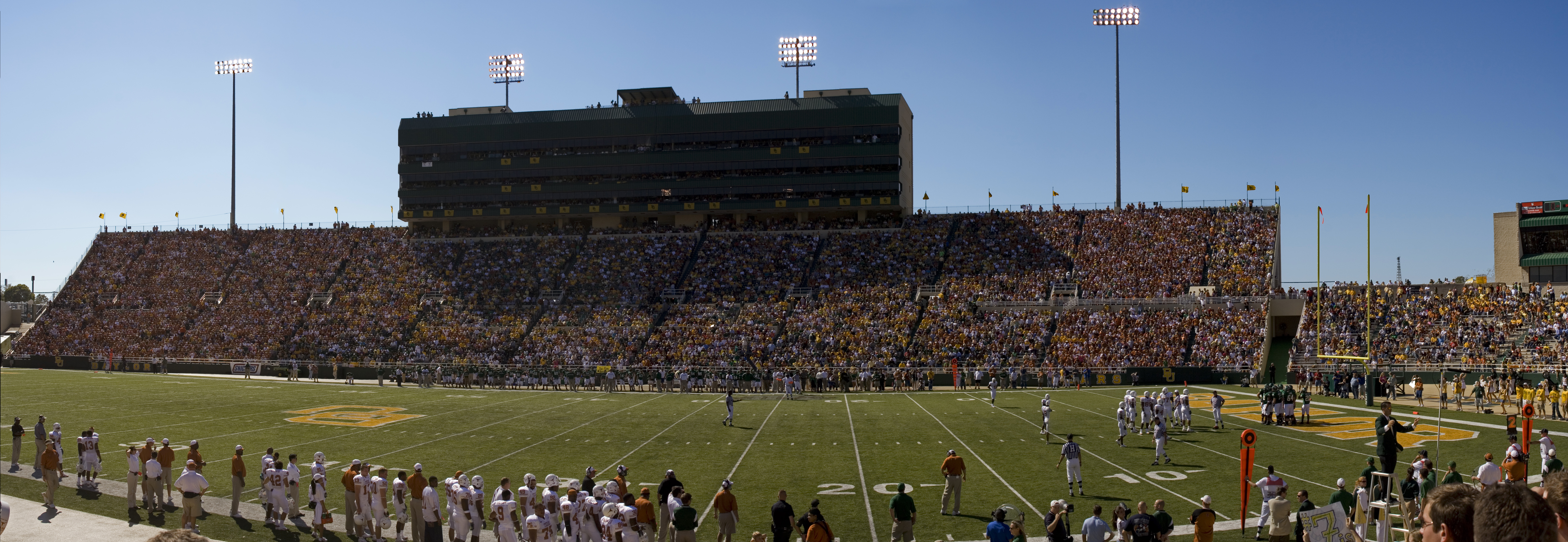
- Floyd Casey Stadium on November 5, 2005 at the Baylor vs. Texas game.
- Interactive map of Floyd Casey Stadium
- Former names: Baylor Stadium (1950–1988)
- Location: 3088 Burnett Avenue; Waco, TX 76711
- Coordinates: 31°31′52.83″N 97°8′55.43″W
- Owner: Baylor University
- Operator: Baylor University
- Capacity: 50,000
- Surface: Grass (1950–1971, 1998–2003); AstroTurf (1972–1997); Prestige System SportGrass (artificial) (2004–2013)

Construction
- Groundbreaking: May 28, 1949
- Opened: September 30, 1950
- Renovated: 1989
- Closed: December 14, 2013
- Demolished: May 14, 2016
- Cost: $1.5 million ($20.1 million in 2025 dollars)
- Architect: Willard Simpson
- General contractor: Swigert Construction Company

Tenant
- Baylor Bears (NCAA) (1950–2013)

Floyd Casey Stadium was a football stadium located in Waco, Texas. It served as the home of the Baylor Bears from 1950 to 2013.

The stadium, located about four miles from the Baylor University campus, cost $1.8 million to build and sat 50,000 people. Originally named Baylor Stadium, it opened in 1950 with a game against the Houston Cougars. On December 7, 2013, Baylor played its last game in the stadium, against the Texas Longhorns, where the attendance record of 51,728 was established. Baylor won 19 of its final 20 games played at the stadium.

In November 1988, the stadium was renamed for Floyd Casey by his son, university trustee and longtime booster Carl B. Casey of Dallas, who contributed US$5 million towards an $8 million renovation project.

The venue was renovated several times. Turf was introduced to the stadium in 1972. In 1998, the stadium installed SportGrass, a leading artificial grass surface. In 2005, it underwent massive renovations to extend the Grant Teaff Plaza in honor of former head coach Grant Teaff. The extended plaza created much-needed updates to the stadium's façade.

The stadium was an elongated oval shape, running southeast-northwest, with large grandstands on the sidelines. The south end zone was cleared, with athletic marks painted on the ground and the large LED scoreboard behind it. (Prior to the creation of the current athletic marks, the area was painted gold, with "BAYLOR" painted in large green block letters.) In 2004, a large tarpaulin was installed that covered the south end zone and could be removed when ticket demand necessitated it. With the tarp in place seating capacity was reduced to 47,000. The north end zone had seating in front of the Carl & Thelma Casey Athletic Center, site of the football offices, training facilities, and stadium field house.

Prior to the building of the stadium, the Baylor football team played at Carroll Field, an on-campus field last used in 1935, and Waco's Municipal Stadium on Dutton Avenue.

In the spring of 2012, Baylor regents approved a new on-campus stadium to be built on the Brazos River adjacent to Interstate 35.

The demolition of the stadium was completed on May 14, 2016.

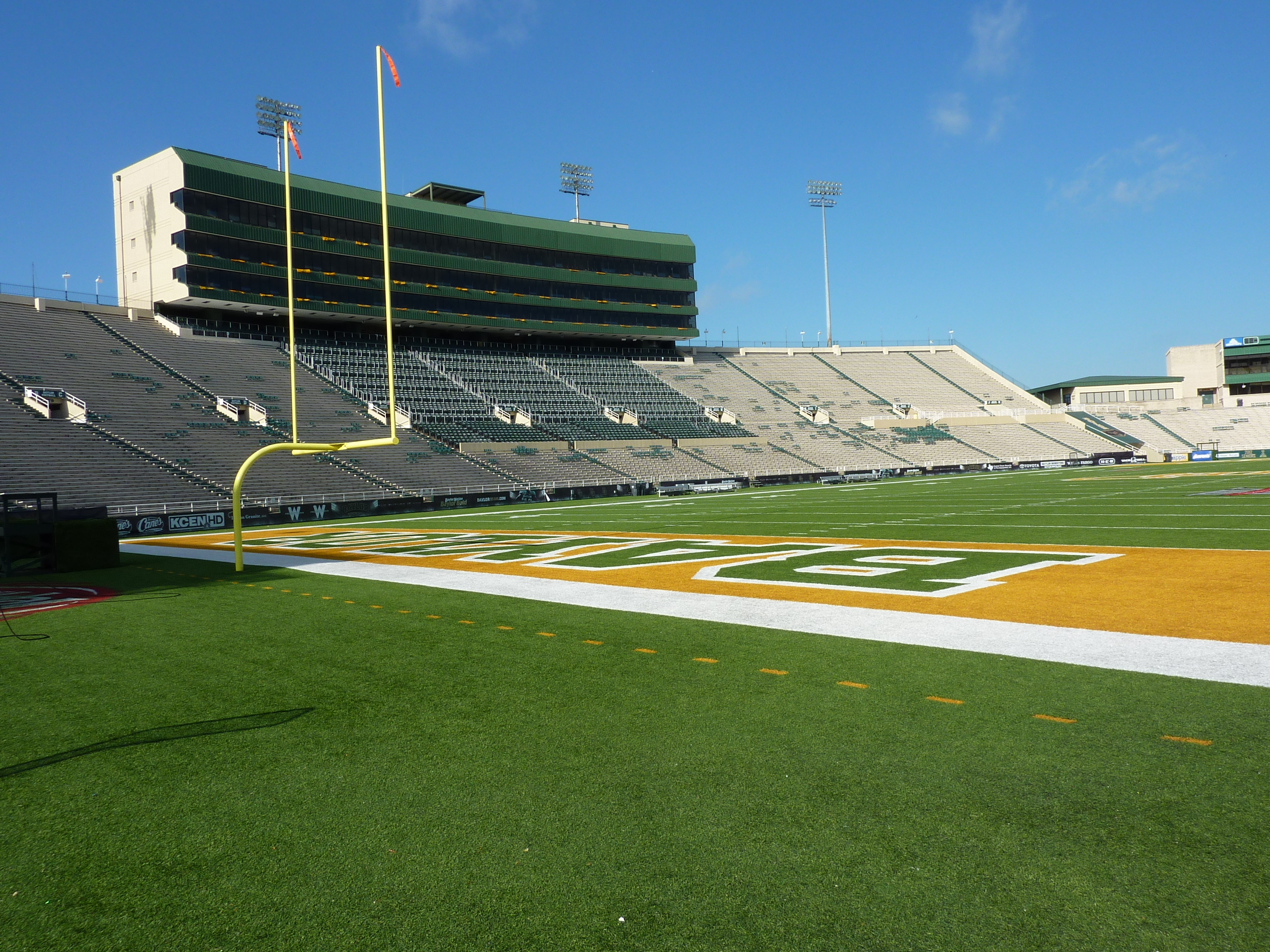
Floyd Casey Stadium

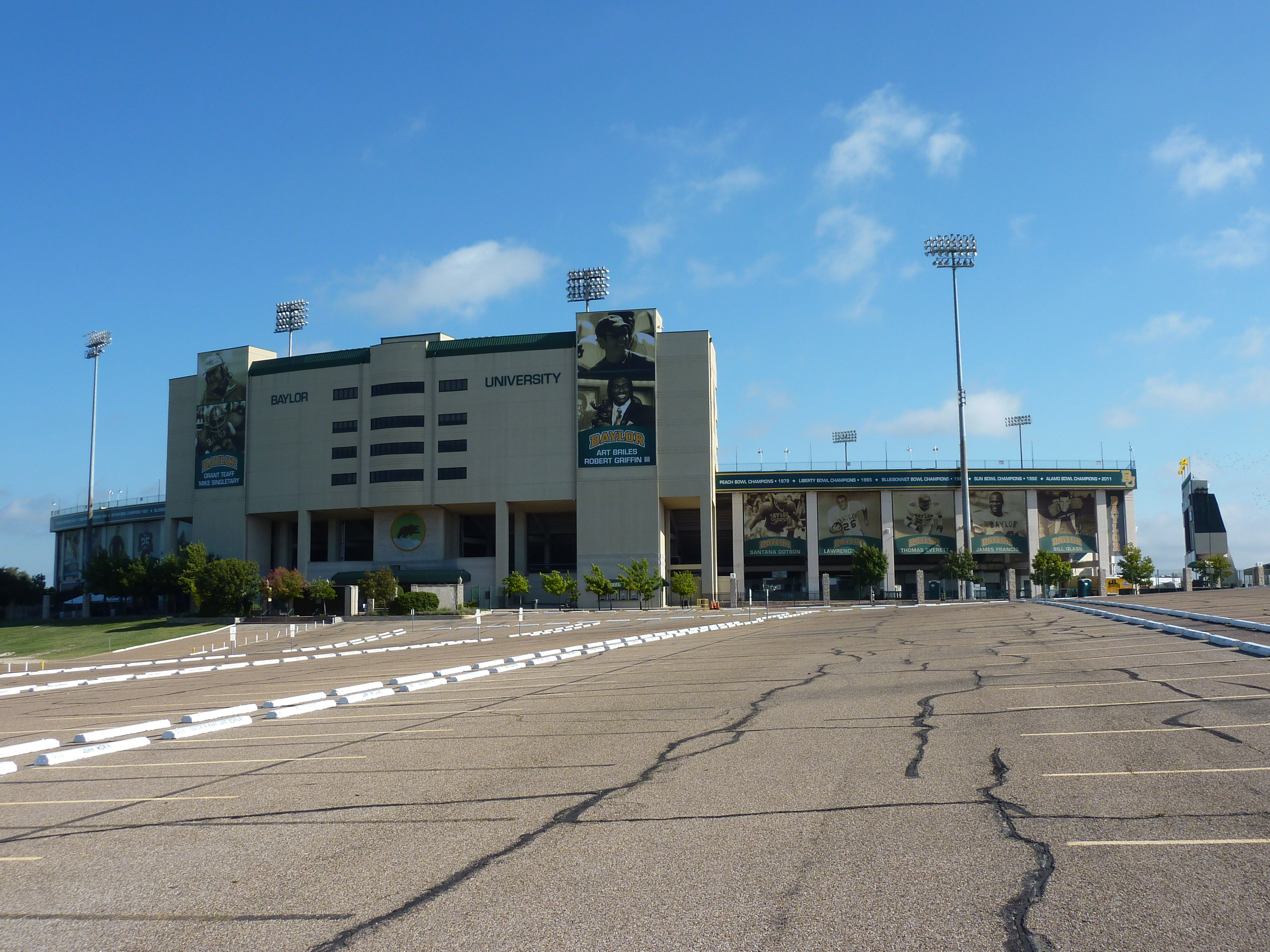
Floyd Casey Stadium

== College football attendance records ==
| Rank | Attendance | Date | Opponent | Score |
|---|---|---|---|---|
| 1 | 51,728 | 12-07-13 | Texas | 30-10 W |
| 2 | 51,385 | 10-28-06 | Texas A&M | 21-31 L |
| 3 | 51,218 | 10-21-95 | Texas A&M | 9-24 L |
| 4 | 51,200 | 10-26-74 | Texas A&M | 0-20 L |
| 5 | 50,537 | 11-8-13 | Oklahoma | 41-12 W |
| 6 | 50,267 | 10-19-91 | Texas A&M | 12-34 L |
| 7 | 50,000 | 11-5-60 | Texas | 7-12 L |
| 8 | 49,500 | 10-27-56 | Texas A&M | 13-19 L |
| 9 | 48,756 | 10-19-85 | Texas A&M | 20-15 W |
| 10 | 48,500 | 9-15-79 | Texas A&M | 17-7 W |
| 11 | 48,500 | 11-22-80 | Texas | 16-0 W |
| 12 | 48,394 | 11-11-72 | Texas | 3-17 L |
| 13 | 47,900 | 11-6-76 | Arkansas | 7-7 T |
| 14 | 47,200 | 9-20-75 | Arkansas | 3-41 L |
| 15 | 46,825 | 10-19-13 | Iowa State | 71-7 W |
| 16 | 46,812 | 10-17-87 | Texas A&M | 10-34 L |
| 17 | 46,543 | 12-03-11 | Texas | 48-24 W |
| 18 | 46,300 | 9-20-75 | Auburn | 10-10 T |
| 19 | 46,000 | 9-15-73 | Oklahoma | 14-42 L |
| T19 | 46,000 | 11-8-80 | Arkansas | 42-15 W |
| 20 | 45,800 | 9-10-77 | Texas Tech | 7-17 L |
| 21 | 45,649 | 11-24-90 | Texas | 13-23 L |
| 22 | 45,565 | 10-21-89 | Texas A&M | 11-14 L |
| 23 | 45,500 | 11-20-76 | Texas | 20-10 W |
