= 1939 Baylor Bears football team =

American college football season

1939 Baylor Bears football
- Conference: Southwest Conference
- Record: 7–3 (4–2 SWC)
- Head coach: Morley Jennings (14th season)
- Captain: Bobby R. Taylor
- Home stadium: Waco Stadium

1939 Southwest Conference football standings
	Conf.					Overall
Team	W		L		T	W		L		T
No. 1 Texas A&M $	6	–	0	–	0	11	–	0	–	0
Baylor	4	–	2	–	0	7	–	3	–	0
SMU	4	–	2	–	0	6	–	3	–	1
Texas	3	–	3	–	0	5	–	4	–	0
Arkansas	2	–	3	–	1	4	–	5	–	1
TCU	1	–	5	–	0	3	–	7	–	0
Rice	0	–	5	–	1	1	–	9	–	1
$ – Conference champion; Rankings from AP Poll

The 1939 Baylor Bears football team represented Baylor University in the Southwest Conference (SWC) during the 1939 college football season. In their 14th season under head coach Morley Jennings, the Bears compiled a 7–3 record (4–2 against conference opponents), tied for second place in the conference, and outscored opponents by a combined total of 136 to 81.

Baylor was not ranked in the final AP poll, but it was ranked at No. 33 in the 1939 Williamson System ratings, and at No. 36 in the Litkenhous Ratings.

They played their home games at Waco Stadium in Waco, Texas. Bobby R. Taylor was the team captain.

== Schedule ==
Date	Opponent	Rank	Site	Result	Attendance	Source
September 30	Southwestern (TX)*		Waco Stadium; Waco, TX	W 34–0		
October 7	at Oklahoma A&M*		Lewis Field; Stillwater, OK	W 13–0	5,000	
October 14	Arkansas		Waco Stadium; Waco, TX	W 19–7		
October 21	at No. 16 Nebraska*	No. 19	Memorial Stadium; Lincoln, NE	L 0–20	27,000	
October 28	at No. 5 Texas A&M		Kyle Field; College Station, TX (rivalry)	L 0–20	20,000	
November 4	TCU^{†}		Waco Stadium; Waco, TX (rivalry)	W 27–0	7,000	
November 11	Texas		Waco Stadium; Waco, TX (rivalry)	W 20–0		
November 18	at Centenary*		Centenary College Stadium; Shreveport, LA	W 13–6		
November 25	at SMU		Ownby Stadium; University Park, TX	L 0–21	14,000	
December 2	at Rice		Rice Field; Houston, TX	W 10–7		
*Non-conference game; ^{†}Homecoming; Rankings from AP Poll released prior to the game
