= 1939 Arkansas Razorbacks football team =

American college football season

1939 Arkansas Razorbacks football
- Conference: Southwest Conference
- Record: 4–5–1 (2–3–1 SWC)
- Head coach: Fred Thomsen (11th season)
- Captains: Kay Eakin; Ray Cole
- Home stadium: Bailey Stadium, Quigley Stadium

1939 Southwest Conference football standings
	Conf.					Overall
Team	W		L		T	W		L		T
No. 1 Texas A&M $	6	–	0	–	0	11	–	0	–	0
Baylor	4	–	2	–	0	7	–	3	–	0
SMU	4	–	2	–	0	6	–	3	–	1
Texas	3	–	3	–	0	5	–	4	–	0
Arkansas	2	–	3	–	1	4	–	5	–	1
TCU	1	–	5	–	0	3	–	7	–	0
Rice	0	–	5	–	1	1	–	9	–	1
$ – Conference champion; Rankings from AP Poll

The 1939 Arkansas Razorbacks football team represented the University of Arkansas in the Southwest Conference (SWC) during the 1939 college football season. In their 11th year under head coach Fred Thomsen, the Razorbacks compiled a 4–5–1 record (2–3–1 against SWC opponents), finished in fifth place in the SWC, and were outscored by their opponents by a combined total of 117 to 115.

Arkansas was not ranked in the final AP poll, but it was ranked at No. 46 in the 1939 Williamson System ratings. and at No. 46 in the Litkenhous Ratings.

== Schedule ==
Date	Opponent	Site	Result	Attendance	Source
September 23	Central State (OK)*	Bailey Stadium; Fayetteville, AR	W 32–6		
September 30	vs. Mississippi State*	Crump Stadium; Memphis, TN	L 0–19	10,000	
October 7	TCU	Bailey Stadium; Fayetteville, AR	W 14–13		
October 14	at Baylor	Waco Stadium; Waco, TX	L 7–19		
October 21	at Texas	War Memorial Stadium; Austin, TX (rivalry)	L 13–14		
October 28	at Villanova*	Shibe Park; Philadelphia, PA	L 0–7	22,000	
November 4	No. 5 Texas A&M^{†}	Bailey Stadium; Fayetteville, AR (rivalry)	L 0–27	11,000	
November 11	at Rice	Rice Field; Houston, TX	T 12–12		
November 17	No. 17 SMU	Quigley Stadium; Little Rock, AR	W 14–0	8,000	
November 30	at Tulsa*	Skelly Field; Tulsa, OK	W 23–0	12,000	
*Non-conference game; ^{†}Homecoming; Rankings from AP Poll released prior to the game
