= Punt (gridiron football) =

Kick downfield to the opposing team in gridiron football

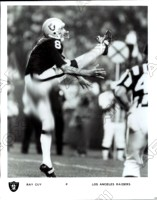
Ray Guy, a member of the Pro Football Hall of Fame, punting in 1985

In gridiron football, a punt is a kick performed by dropping the ball from the hands and then kicking the ball before it hits the ground. The most common use of this tactic is to punt the ball downfield to the opposing team, usually on the final down, with the hope of maximizing the distance the opposing team must advance in order to score. The result of a typical punt, barring any penalties or extraordinary circumstances, is a first down for the receiving team. A punt is not to be confused with a drop kick, a kick after the ball hits the ground, now rare in both American and Canadian football.

The type of punt leads to different motion of the football. Alex Moffat invented the now-common spiral punt, as opposed to end-over-end.

== Description ==
A punt in gridiron football is a kick performed by dropping the ball from the hands and then kicking the ball before it hits the ground. In football, the offense has a limited number of downs, or plays, in which to move the ball at least 10 yards. The team in possession of the ball will typically punt the ball to the opposing team when it is on its final down (fourth down in American football, third down in Canadian football), does not want to risk a turnover on downs by not gaining enough yardage to make a first down, and does not believe it is in range for a successful field goal. The purpose of the punt is for the team in possession, or "kicking team", to move the ball as far as possible towards the opponent's end zone; this maximizes the distance the receiving team must advance the ball in order to score a touchdown upon taking possession.

A punt play involves the kicking team lining up at the line of scrimmage with the kicker, or punter, typically lined up about 15 yards behind the center. In American football, the end zone is only 10 yards deep and as such this distance must be shortened if the kicker's normal position would be on or beyond the end line. In Canadian football the end zone is 20 yards deep and therefore sufficiently large for the punter to take his usual position in any situation. However, Canadian rules also give scored-on teams more advantageous field position following a safety, so Canadian football punters will often choose to concede two points instead of punting from the end zone.

The receiving team lines up with one or two players downfield to catch the ball. The center makes a long snap to the kicker who then drops the ball and kicks it before it hits the ground. The player who catches the ball is then entitled to attempt to advance the ball.

The result of a typical punt, barring any penalties or extraordinary circumstances, is a first down for the receiving team at the spot where:

- the receiver or subsequent receiving team ball carrier is downed or goes out of bounds;
- the ball crosses out of bounds, whether in flight or after touching the ground;
- there is "illegal touching", defined as when a player from the kicking team is the first player to touch the ball after it has been punted beyond the line of scrimmage; or
- a ball which is allowed to land comes to rest in-bounds without being touched (American football only).

Other possible results include the punt being blocked behind the line of scrimmage, and the ball being touched, but not caught or possessed, downfield by the receiving team. In both cases the ball is then "free" and "live" and will belong to whichever team recovers it.

== Rules ==
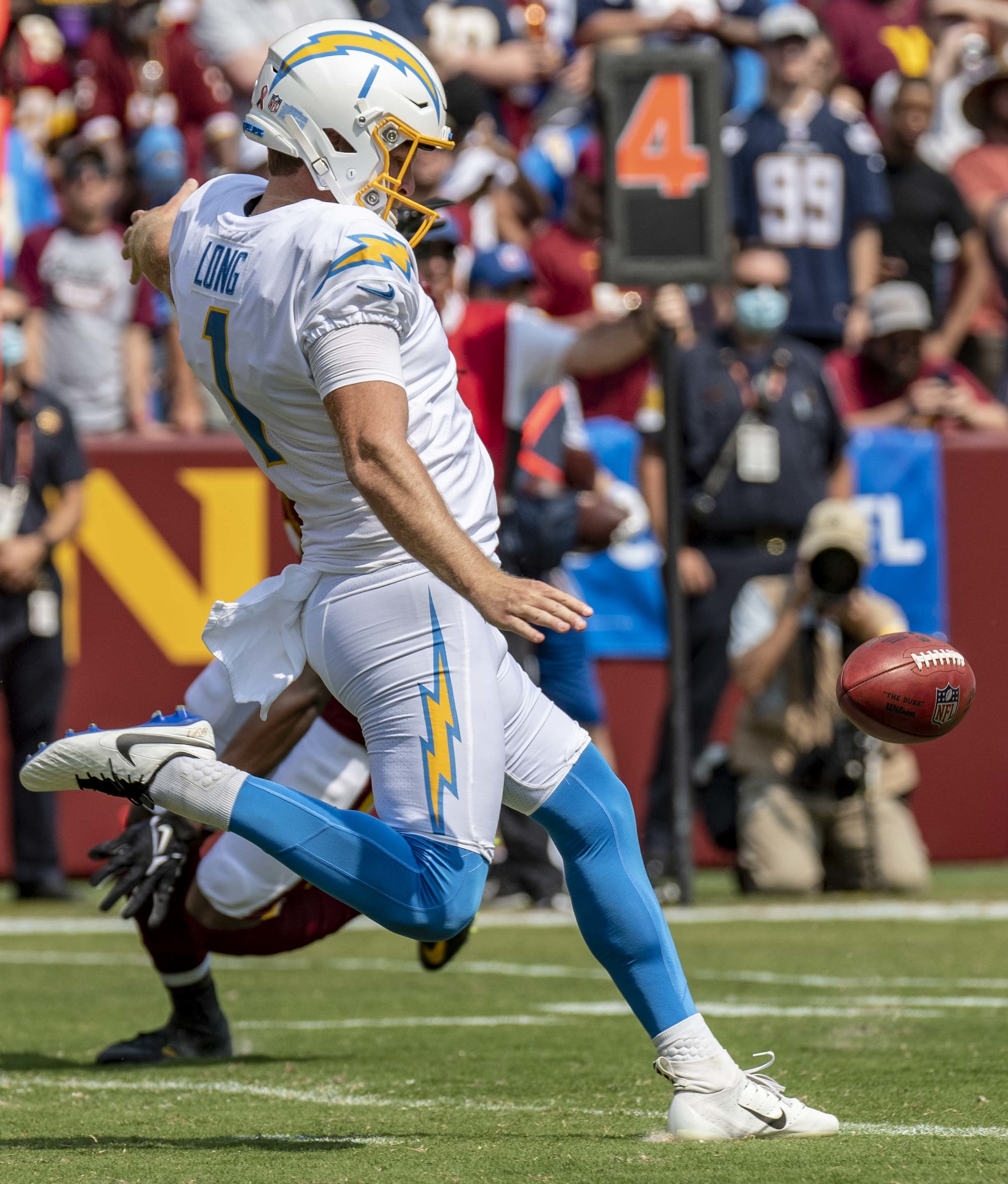
Ty Long of the Los Angeles Chargers punting in 2021

=== Common to American and Canadian football ===
- If the kicked ball fails to cross the line of scrimmage, it may be picked up and advanced by either team. However, if it is picked up by the kicking team, the play is treated as any other play from scrimmage; i.e., if it is the team's final down, it must advance the ball beyond the first down marker in order to avoid a turnover on downs. There are two ways a punt can fail to cross the line of scrimmage: a blocked kick, in which the opposing team obstructs the path of the punt shortly after it leaves the punter's foot; and a shank, in which the punter fails to advance the kick beyond the line of scrimmage on his own (usually erroneous) action. If a punt crosses the plane above the line of scrimmage at any point during the punt, it is treated as such and the kicking team may not advance it, even if the ball moves on its own volition (either due to a headwind or errant bounce) back behind the line.
  - Deliberate, targeted punting to another player on the kicking team behind the line of scrimmage has some strategic advantages (for example, an offensive lineman can receive a forward punt but is not eligible to receive a screen pass) but, because of some disadvantages (any errant kick that crosses the line of scrimmage would result in lost possession), is extremely rare as a strategy.
- The official rules regulate when and how the receiving team may hit the kicker before, during, and after the kick.
- If the receiving team drops the ball or touches the ball beyond the line of scrimmage without catching it then it is considered a live ball and may be recovered by either team. If the receiving team never had full possession, it is considered to be a muffed punt rather than a fumble. However, the receiving player must be actively pursuing the ball. If the receiving player is blocked into the ball, it is not considered "touching" the ball.
- A field goal cannot be scored on a punt kick.
  - By contrast, the now very rarely attempted drop kick can be used to score either field goals or extra points in both American and Canadian football.

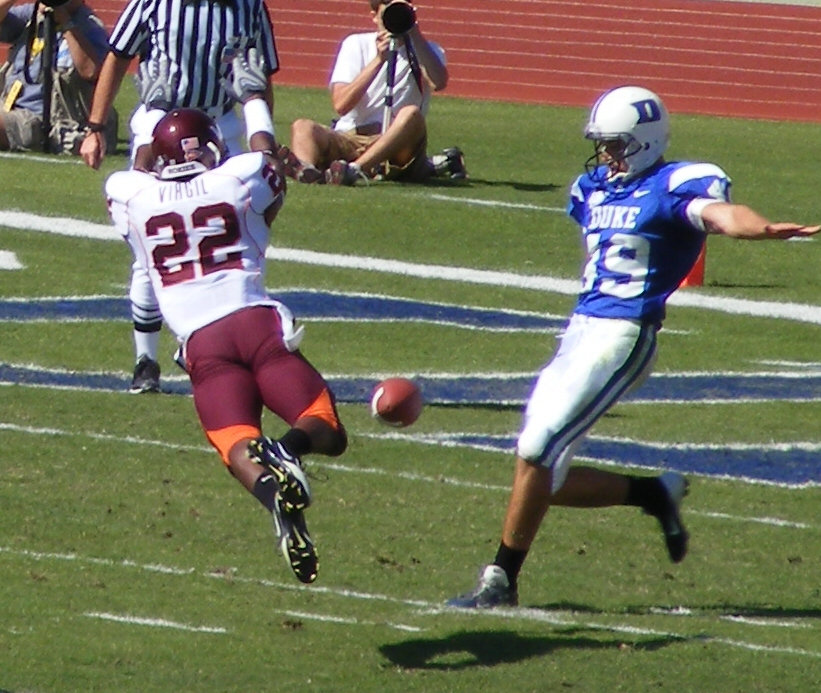
The 2007 Virginia Tech Hokies football team blocks a punt against the Duke Blue Devils

=== American football ===
- The player attempting to catch the kicked ball may attempt a fair catch. If caught, the ball becomes dead and the receiving team gets the ball at the spot of the catch.
- A touchback may be called if any of the following occur: (1) The kicked ball lands in the receiving team's end zone without first touching any player, whether as a direct result of the kick or a bounce. (2) The receiving team catches the ball in its own end zone and downs it before advancing the ball out of the end zone. (In high school football, the ball automatically becomes dead when it crosses the goal line and cannot be returned out of the end zone, except in Texas, which bases its high school rules on the NCAA rule set.) (3) The ball enters then exits the end zone behind the goal line. After a touchback, the receiving team gets the ball at its own 20-yard line except in the current UFL, which spots the ball on the receiving team's 25-yard line. The UFL also spots the ball on the 25 if a punt goes out of bounds between the receiving team's 25-yard line and its own end zone.
- If a player from the kicking team is the first to touch the ball after it crosses the line of scrimmage, "illegal touching" is called and the receiving team gains possession at the spot where the illegal touching occurred. This is often not considered to be detrimental to the kicking team; for example, it is common for a player on the kicking team to deliberately touch the ball near the goal line before it enters the end zone to prevent a touchback. Since there is no further yardage penalty awarded, the kicking team is often said to have "downed the ball" when this occurs (and the NFL does not count it as an official penalty). While the ball is not automatically dead upon an illegal touch, and can be advanced by the receiving team (who would then have the choice of accepting the result of the play or taking the ball at the spot of the illegal touch), this rarely happens in practice, as illegal touching typically occurs when members of the kicking team are closer to the ball than members of the receiving team. In the NFL, this is referred to as "first touching," and is considered a "violation," and cannot offset a foul by the receiving team. Moreover, kicking team players are allowed to bat the ball back into the field of play so long as they have not touched the goal line or end zone, even if their bodies enter the air above the end zone; in such cases, the ball is spotted from where the player jumped or the 1-yard line, whichever is farther from the goal line.
- The length of the punt, referred to as punting yards or gross punting yards, is measured from the line of scrimmage (not the spot where the punter punts) to whichever of the following points applies: (1) the spot that a punt is caught; (2) the spot that a punt goes out of bounds; (3) the spot that a punt is declared dead because of illegal touching; or (4) the goal line, for punts that are ruled touchbacks.
- The net punting yardage is taken by calculating the total punting yardage and subtracting any yardage earned by the receiving team on returns, and subtracting 20 yards for each touchback.
- Under no circumstance can the kicking team score points as the direct result of a punt. (It can score indirectly if the receiving team loses possession of the ball or runs back into its own end zone and gets tackled.)

=== Canadian football ===
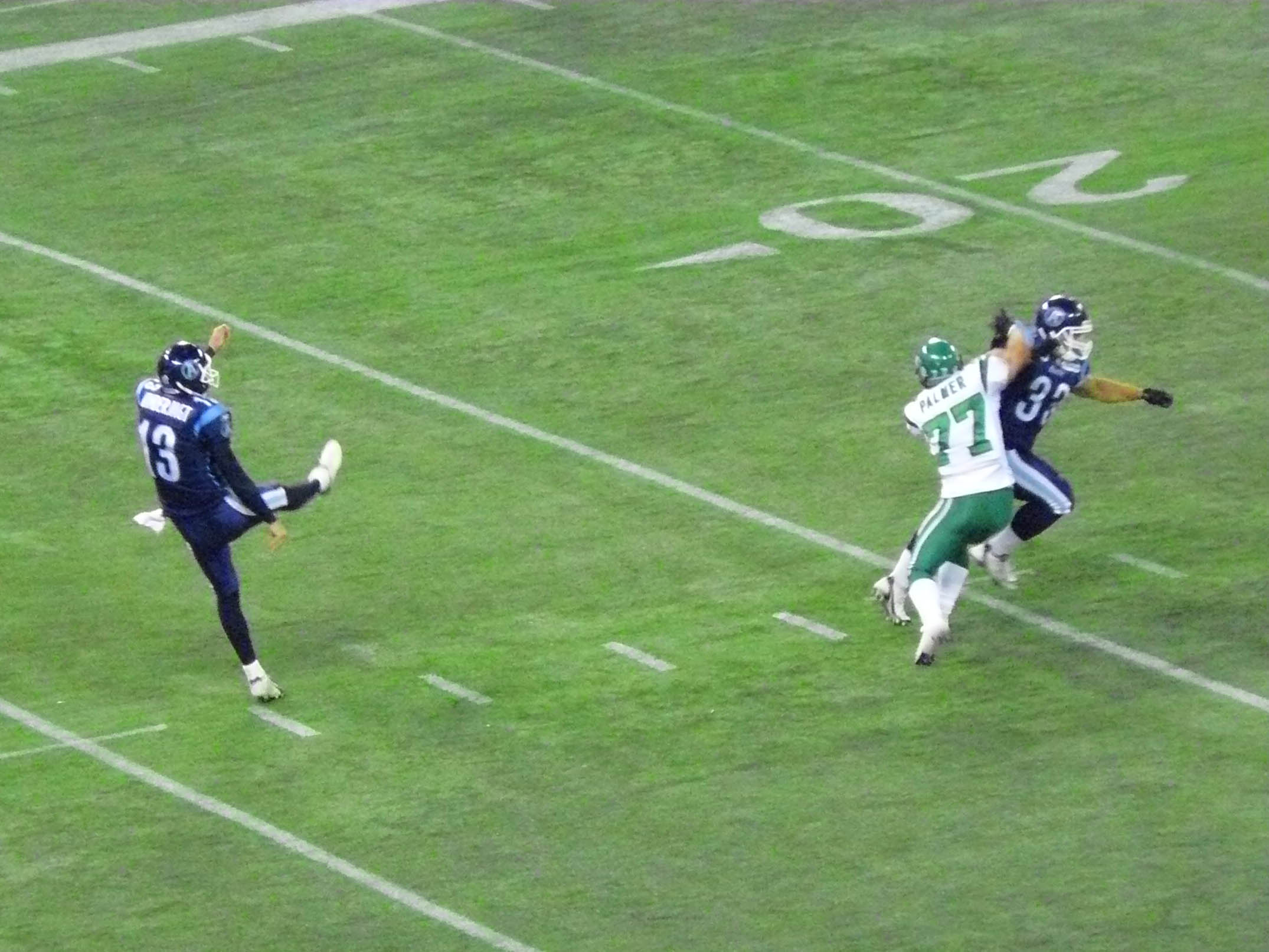
Mike Vanderjagt (left) punting for the Toronto Argonauts in 2008.

- The kicker and any players behind him at the time of the kick are considered "onside"; any other players on the kicking team are considered "offside". This is the same rule that makes all players "onside" on a kickoff since they are behind the ball once kicked. A player who is onside may recover the kicked ball, while a player who is offside may not be the first to touch the kicked ball and is required to remain at least 5 yards from an opposing player attempting to catch the ball. Violations of these restrictions on an offside player are called "no yards" infractions, with various penalties associated with them.
- The ball remains in play if it enters the goal area (end zone) until it is downed by a player on either team or goes out of bounds:
  - If a member of the receiving team downs it in the goal area or the ball goes out of bounds before being brought back into the field of play, a single is awarded to the kicking team and the receiving team gains possession at their own 35-yard line.
  - If an onside player downs the ball in the goal area, the kicking team is awarded a touchdown.
  - If an offside player downs the ball in the goal area, the receiving team gains possession after a "no yards" penalty is applied from their own 10-yard line.
- If the ball strikes the goalpost assembly while in flight the receiving team gains possession at their own 25-yard line.
- The length of the punt is measured from the line of scrimmage to the spot of the catch or the point where the kick goes out of bounds. The punt return is measured independently, though the value of the punt to the kicking team is determined by distance from the line of scrimmage to the end of the return.
- Canadian rules also allow a punt when the punter is not behind the line of scrimmage, which is not permitted in American rules. This tactic (termed an "open-field kick" in the rule book) is similar to rugby and in the modern game is usually reserved for last-second desperation: for example, a player, after receiving a forward pass with no time left on the clock and with no hope of evading tacklers, may punt the ball in the hope that it will score a single or be recovered by an onside teammate. After recovering a ball kicked by the other team a player can also punt out of his own end zone in order to avoid a single. On at least two occasions in the CFL, the last play of the game was a missed field goal attempt followed by three punts, as the teams alternately tried to avoid a single and score a single.

== Types and styles of punts ==
In American Football, different types of punts have developed over time as punters adapted to strategic needs such as field position, coverage optimization, and limiting punt returns. The spiral punt, credited to Alex Moffat in the early 1880s, was an early innovation that became widespread due to its increased aerodyamic efficiency compared with earlier punt styles.

In the modern era, punters have expanded the variety of kicks they employ beyond traditional spirals and end-over-end punts. Notably Sam Koch of the Baltimore Ravens has been recognized for developing a diverse set of punt variations tailored to specific game situations, often described metaphorically as a "golf bag" of different punts with varying trajectories and behaviors to influence hang time, placement, and return opportunities.

Influences from other football codes, including rugby-style kicks and techniques seen in Australian rules football, have also contributed to the diversity of punt types seen at collegiate and professional levels. These broader developments reflect the evolution of punting from a relatively uniform skill to a nuanced and tactical component of team strategy.

=== End-over-end punt ===
In an end-over-end punt the football rotates forward over its short axis, rather than spinning along its long axis as in a spiral punt. This style generally produces a more vertical trajectory and a shorter overall distance, but allows for greater control of ball placement and bounce behavior upon landing.

End-over-end punts are often used in situations where limiting the return is more important than maximizing distance, such as punts near the opponent's end zone. Because the ball tends to bounce more predictably forward or stop quickly, this technique is commonly employed to execute coffin corner punts, to avoid touchbacks, and to increase the net punt average of the punter.

While less common in traditional American football punting, the end-over-end punt is closely related to the drop punt used in Australian rules football, and elements of this technique have influenced modern punting styles, including the Australian-style punt increasingly used in gidirion football.

=== Spiral punt ===
Alex Moffat is generally recognized as the creator of the spiral punt, having developed it during his time as a college athlete in the early 1880s. The spiral punt is typically the longest type of punt kick used in gridiron football. During flight, the ball spins about its long axis, rather than rotating end over end as in a drop punt. This rotational motion increases aerodynamic stability, allowing the ball to travel farther with a more consistent trajectory.

The elongated shape of gridiron footballs further enhances the effectiveness of the spiral punt, though the tight spiral can also make the ball more easy for returners to catch cleanly compared to other punt types, this because of its pass-like trajectory and spiral.

=== Aussie-style punt ===
An Aussie-style punt is a modern punting technique adapted from Australian rules football and Rugby football, characterized by an angled drop and off-center contact intended to control the ball's bounce and roll. The kick often produces a forward or sideways bounce designed to limit return opportunities and improve field position.

The technique has become increasingly common in gridiron football at both the collegiate and professional levels, influenced by Australian-trained punters and further developed in the NFL by players such as Sam Koch, Tory Taylor, Michael Dickson, and Jordan Berry. Amongst others.

=== Rugby-style punt ===
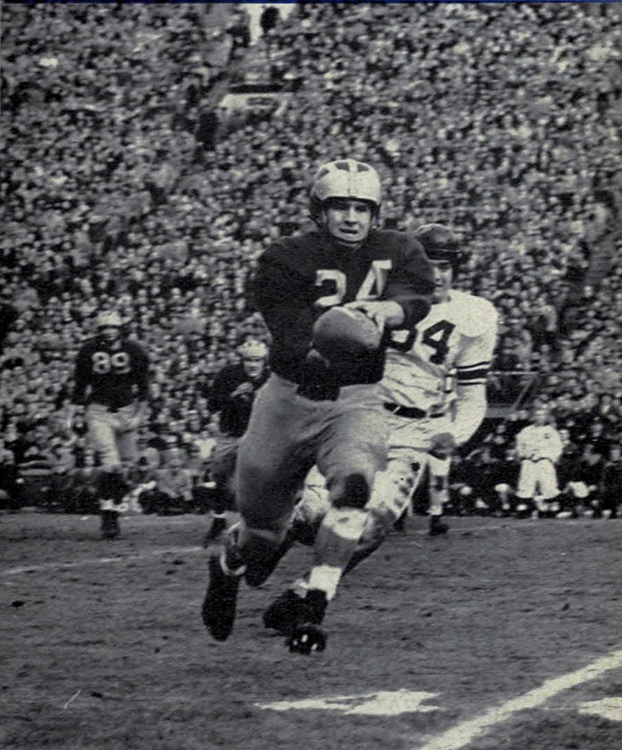
Bill Putich punting on the run

A rugby-style punt is executed with a running approach, typically to the left or right, before the ball is kicked while the punter remains behind the line of scrimmage. This style differs from a traditional stationary punt by incorporating lateral movement, which allows the punter to influence the ball’s direction, trajectory, and landing behavior.

The rugby-style punt is often used to produce directional kicks toward the sideline, reduce return opportunities, or create unpredictable bounces upon landing. The angled approach and contact point can result in balls that roll, check up near the boundary, or change direction after hitting the ground, making them more difficult for returners to field cleanly.

This technique gained prominence in American football through punters with backgrounds in rugby football and Australian rules football, and has become increasingly common in college football and the NFL. Modern punters frequently adapt the rugby-style approach to execute situational kicks such as directional punts, boundary punts, and kicks designed to flip field position.

=== Directional punt ===
A directional punt is a type of punt intentionally aimed toward a specific area of the field, most commonly the sideline or the numbers, rather than directly down the center. The primary objective is to limit return opportunities by reducing the amount of field available to the returner.

Directional punts are widely used in modern gridiron football and may be executed using a variety of techniques, including spiral, low line-drive, or rugby-style kicks, depending on field position and strategic considerations. Within informal punting communities, certain low, sideline-directed variations of the directional punt are sometimes colloquially referred to as a "Louie punt", though the term is not formally recognized.

=== Pooch punt ===
Teams may line up in a normal offensive formation and have the quarterback perform a pooch punt, also known as a quick kick. This usually happens in situations where the offense is in a 4th and long situation in their opponent's territory, but are too close to the end zone for a traditional punt and (depending on weather conditions) too far for a field goal try—a situation also known as the dead zone. Like fake punt attempts, these are rarely tried, although Randall Cunningham, Tom Brady, Matt Cassel and Ben Roethlisberger have successfully executed pooch punts in the modern NFL era. Some pooch punts occur on third down and long situations in American football to fool the defense, which is typically not prepared to return a punt on third down.

=== Banana punt ===
A banana punt is a type of punt in which the football is struck at an angle that causes it to curve laterally during flight rather than travel in a straight downfield trajectory. This curved path is produced by imparting off-axis spin on the ball, resulting in a sideways deviation that can complicate return attempts and influence the ball's bounce upon landing.

The banana punt is derived from kicking techniques commonly used in Australian rules football, where similar methods are emplyed to bend the ball toward specific areas of the field. As Australian-trained punters entered American Football at the collegiate and professional levels, elements of these techniques were adapted for use in gridiron punting.

In gridiron football, the banana punt is typically used situationally to reduce return opportunities, direct the ball toward the sideline, or produce an umpredictable bounce near the goal line. Due to its technical difficulty compared to conventional spiral punts, it remains less common and is primarily attempted by punters with experience in rugby-style or Australian kicking techniques.

=== Boomerang punt ===
A boomerang punt is a type of punt in which the football is kicked with pronounced lateral spin, causing it to curve back toward the punter's side of the field during flight or after bouncing on the ground.

The boomerang punt is influenced by techniques used in Australian rules football and Rugby football, where curved kicks are commonly employed to direct the ball toward specific areas of the field. As Australian-trained punters entered American Football, elements of these kicking styles were adapted to suit gridiron strategy, particularly in situations requiring precise sideline placement or reduced return opportunities.

The boomerang punt is most often used to force the ball toward the sideline or to create an unpredictable bounce that limits the returner's ability to field the kick cleanly, potentially creating a fumble. Because of its technical complexity and reliance on controlled side spin, it is less common than conventional spiral or end-over-end punts and is primarily attempted by punters with experience in rugby-style kicking techniques.

=== Knuckleball punt ===
A knuckleball punt is a rare type of punt in which the football is struck with little to no rotational spin, resulting in an unstable and irregular flight path. The lack of consistent rotation can cause the ball to move unpredictably through the air and bounce erratically upon landing, making it difficult for returnes to field cleanly.

=== Fake punts ===
On very rare occasions, a punting team will elect to attempt a "fake punt"—line up in punt formation and begin the process as normal, but instead do one of the following:

- The punter may choose to run with the ball.
- The ball may be snapped to the upback, who then runs with the ball.
- The punter (or another back, who is standing nearby) may decide to pass to a pre-designated receiver.
- The ball may be snapped to the upback, who then passes the ball to a receiver.

Although teams sometimes use fake punts to exploit a weakness in the opposing team's defense, a fake punt is very rare, and often used in desperate situations, such as to keep a drive alive when a team is behind and needs to catch up quickly, or to spark an offense in a game where the defense dominates. The high risk of "fake punts", and the need to maintain an element of surprise when the play is actually called, explains why this play is seldom seen. Fake punts are more likely to occur when there is short yardage remaining to secure a first down, or the line of scrimmage is inside the opponent's territory.

One of the most famous fake punts was by New York Giants linebacker Gary Reasons during the 1990 NFC Championship Game against the San Francisco 49ers, in which he rushed for 30 yards on a fourth down conversion via a direct snap to him instead of the punter, Sean Landeta, which was a critical difference in a 15–13 victory. The Giants went on to win Super Bowl XXV.

== Punting records ==
- The longest punt in North American pro football history is a 108-yarder by Zenon Andrusyshyn of the Canadian Football League's Toronto Argonauts (at Edmonton, October 23, 1977). This record was also tied by Christopher Milo of the Saskatchewan Roughriders on October 29, 2011, at a home game at Mosaic Stadium at Taylor Field in Regina, during which winds gusted above 35 miles per hour (56 km/h). Taylor Field, which has since been replaced and demolished, also remains the site of the three longest field goals in CFL history and was one of the windiest fields in professional football.
- The longest punt in NFL/AFL play was a 98-yarder by Steve O'Neal of the New York Jets in an American Football League regular season loss to the Denver Broncos at Mile High Stadium on September 21, 1969.
- Jeff Feagles is the all-time NFL career punts and punt yards leader with 1,713 punts and 71,211 punt yards over 352 games.
- Bob Cameron is the all-time CFL career punts and punt yards leader with 3,129 punts and 134,301 punt yards over 394 games.
- Shane Lechler holds the NFL record for career punting average with 47.6 yards per punt.
- Ryan Stonehouse holds the single-season record for yards per punt with a 53.1 yards per punt average in 2022 (90 punts for 4,779 yards). This broke an 82-year-old record held by Sammy Baugh who averaged 51.4 yards per punt in 1940 (35 punts for 1,799 yards).
- The record for college football is held by the University of Nevada's Pat Brady, who booted the longest possible punt on a 100-yard field at 99 yards against Loyola University on October 28, 1950.
- Joe Theismann punted for one yard against the Chicago Bears in 1985.

== Return ==
A punt return is one of the receiving team's options to respond to a punt. A player positioned about 35–45 yards from the line of scrimmage (usually a wide receiver or return specialist) will attempt to catch or pick up the ball after it is punted by the opposing team's punter. He then attempts to carry the ball as far as possible back in the direction of the line of scrimmage, without being tackled or running out of bounds. He may also lateral the ball to teammates in order to keep the play alive should he expect to be tackled or go out of bounds. The punting team may employ a "directional punting" strategy. This strategy has a punter place the ball in a way that pins returners against the sideline deep on their side of the field, minimizing their potential to have a big return.

DeSean Jackson, then playing for the Philadelphia Eagles in the "Miracle at the New Meadowlands", is the only NFL player to return a punt for a game-winning touchdown on the final play of regulation. The NFL record holder for the number of punt returns for a touchdown in a career is Devin Hester with 14. The CFL career record holder for most punt returns for a touchdown in a career is Gizmo Williams with 26.

== See also ==
- Glossary of American football
- Short punt formation
- Coffin corner (American football)
- American Football Kicking Hall of Fame
- No Punt Game
- When Punts Rained from the Sky
