= 1939 Tulsa Golden Hurricane football team =

American college football season

1939 Tulsa Golden Hurricane football
- Conference: Missouri Valley Conference
- Record: 4–5–1 (2–1–1 MVC)
- Head coach: Chet Benefiel (1st season)
- Home stadium: Skelly Field

1939 Missouri Valley Conference football standings
| | Conf. | | | | | Overall |
| Team | W | | L | | T | W | | L | | T |
|---|---|---|---|---|---|---|---|---|---|---|
| Washington University $ | 4 | – | 1 | – | 0 | 6 | – | 3 | – | 1 |
| Oklahoma A&M | 3 | – | 1 | – | 0 | 5 | – | 4 | – | 1 |
| Tulsa | 2 | – | 1 | – | 1 | 4 | – | 5 | – | 1 |
| Drake | 2 | – | 3 | – | 0 | 5 | – | 5 | – | 0 |
| Saint Louis | 1 | – | 2 | – | 1 | 5 | – | 3 | – | 2 |
| Creighton | 2 | – | 4 | – | 0 | 4 | – | 5 | – | 0 |
| Washburn | 1 | – | 3 | – | 0 | 6 | – | 4 | – | 0 |
$ – Conference champion

The 1939 Tulsa Golden Hurricane football team represented the University of Tulsa during the 1939 college football season. In their first year under head coach Chet Benefiel, the Golden Hurricane compiled a 4–5–1 record (2–1–1 against conference opponents) and finished in third place in the Missouri Valley Conference.

Tulsa was ranked at No. 100 (out of 609 teams) in the final Litkenhous Ratings for 1939.

== Schedule ==
| Date | Opponent | Site | Result | Attendance | Source |
|---|---|---|---|---|---|
| September 30 | Wichita* | Skelly Field; Tulsa, OK | W 23–6 | 10,000 | |
| October 7 | at Creighton | Creighton Stadium; Omaha, NE | W 21–14 | 12,000 | |
| October 14 | Oklahoma A&M | Skelly Field; Tulsa, OK (rivalry) | L 7–9 | 11,000 | |
| October 21 | Centenary* | Skelly Field; Tulsa, OK | W 15–7 | 9,500 | |
| October 28 | Detroit*^{†} | Skelly Field; Tulsa, OK | L 7–16 | 8,500 | |
| November 4 | at Catholic University* | Brookland Stadium; Washington, DC | L 7–13 | | |
| November 11 | at TCU* | Amon G. Carter Stadium; Fort Worth, TX | L 0–16 | 5,000 | |
| November 18 | Saint Louis | Skelly Field; Tulsa, OK | T 0–0 | 6,500 | |
| November 25 | Drake | Skelly Field; Tulsa, OK | W 14–0 | 5,000 | |
| November 30 | Arkansas* | Skelly Field; Tulsa, OK | L 0–23 | 12,000 | |
*Non-conference game; ^{†}Homecoming

== After the season ==
The 1940 NFL draft was held on December 9, 1939. The following Golden Hurricane players were selected.

| Round | Pick | Player | Position | NFL club |
|---|---|---|---|---|
| 11 | 100 | John McKibben | End | New York Giants |
| 15 | 140 | Othel Turner | Tackle | New York Giants |
