= 1939 Oklahoma A&M Cowboys football team =

American college football season

1939 Oklahoma A&M Cowboys football
- Conference: Missouri Valley Conference
- Record: 5–4–1 (3–1 MVC)
- Head coach: Ted Cox (1st season)
- Home stadium: Lewis Field

1939 Missouri Valley Conference football standings
	Conf.					Overall
Team	W		L		T	W		L		T
Washington University $	4	–	1	–	0	6	–	3	–	1
Oklahoma A&M	3	–	1	–	0	5	–	4	–	1
Tulsa	2	–	1	–	1	4	–	5	–	1
Drake	2	–	3	–	0	5	–	5	–	0
Saint Louis	1	–	2	–	1	5	–	3	–	2
Creighton	2	–	4	–	0	4	–	5	–	0
Washburn	1	–	3	–	0	6	–	4	–	0
$ – Conference champion

The 1939 Oklahoma A&M Cowboys football team represented Oklahoma A&M College in the 1939 college football season. This was the 39th year of football at A&M and the first under Jim Lookabaugh. The Cowboys played their home games at Lewis Field in Stillwater, Oklahoma. They finished the season 5–4–1, 3–1 in the Missouri Valley Conference.

Oklahoma A&M was ranked at No. 99 (out of 609 teams) in the final Litkenhous Ratings for 1939.

== Schedule ==
Date	Opponent	Site	Result	Attendance	Source
September 23	vs. Texas A&M*	Taft Stadium; Oklahoma City, OK	L 0–32	6,000	
September 30	Northwestern Oklahoma State*	Lewis Field; Stillwater, OK	W 52–0		
October 7	Baylor*	Lewis Field; Stillwater, OK	L 0–13	5,000	
October 14	at Tulsa	Skelly Field; Tulsa, OK (rivalry)	W 9–7	11,000	
October 21	at Washburn	Moore Bowl; Topeka, KS	W 27–6		
October 28	at No. 6 Oklahoma*	Memorial Stadium; Norman, OK (Bedlam Series)	L 0–41		
November 4	New Mexico A&M*	Lewis Field; Stillwater, OK	W 20–0		
November 11	at Washington University	Francis Field; St. Louis, MO	L 0–7		
November 18	Wichita*	Wichita, KS	T 0–0		
November 25	Creighton^{†}	Lewis Field; Stillwater, OK	W 20–9		
*Non-conference game; ^{†}Homecoming; Rankings from Coaches' Poll released prior to the game

== After the season ==
The 1940 NFL draft took place on December 9, 1939 at the Schroeder Hotel in Milwaukee. The following Oklahoma State player was selected during the draft.

Player	Position	Round	Pick	NFL team
Ralph Foster	T	5th	151	Chicago Cardinals
