= 1939 Utah State Aggies football team =

American college football season

1939 Utah State Aggies football
- Conference: Mountain States Conference
- Record: 3–4–1 (2–3–1 MSC)
- Head coach: Dick Romney (21st season)
- Home stadium: Aggie Stadium

1939 Mountain States Conference football standings
	Conf.					Overall
Team	W		L		T	W		L		T
Colorado $	5	–	1	–	0	5	–	3	–	0
Utah	4	–	1	–	1	6	–	1	–	2
Denver	3	–	2	–	1	5	–	3	–	1
BYU	2	–	2	–	2	5	–	2	–	2
Utah State	2	–	3	–	1	3	–	4	–	1
Colorado A&M	2	–	4	–	0	2	–	7	–	0
Wyoming	0	–	5	–	1	0	–	7	–	1
$ – Conference champion

The 1939 Utah State Aggies football team was an American football team that represented Utah State Agricultural College in the Mountain States Conference (MSC) during the 1939 college football season. In their 21st season under head coach Dick Romney, the Aggies compiled a 3–4–1 record (2–3–1 against MSC opponents), finished fifth in the MSC, and were outscored by a total of 81 to 76.

Utah State was ranked at No. 188 (out of 609 teams) in the final Litkenhous Ratings for 1939.

== Schedule ==
Date	Opponent	Site	Result	Attendance	Source
September 30	College of Idaho*	Aggie Stadium; Logan, UT	W 33–0		
October 7	at Colorado	Colorado Stadium; Boulder, CO	W 16–6		
October 21	Denver	Aggie Stadium; Logan, UT	L 0–7		
October 28	Colorado A&M^{†}	Aggie Stadium; Logan, UT	L 0–9	7,000	
November 4	at Idaho*	Neale Stadium; Moscow, ID	L 7–19	2,500	
November 11	BYU	Aggie Stadium; Logan, UT (rivalry)	T 0–0	9,000	
November 18	at Wyoming	Corbett Field; Laramie, WY (rivalry)	W 20–13	5,000	
November 23	at Utah	Ute Stadium; Salt Lake City, UT (rivalry)	L 0–27	15,725	
*Non-conference game; ^{†}Homecoming
