= 1939 Rice Owls football team =

American college football season

1939 Rice Owls football
- Conference: Southwest Conference
- Record: 1–9–1 (0–5–1 SWC)
- Head coach: Jimmy Kitts (6th season)
- Home stadium: Rice Field

1939 Southwest Conference football standings
	Conf.					Overall
Team	W		L		T	W		L		T
No. 1 Texas A&M $	6	–	0	–	0	11	–	0	–	0
Baylor	4	–	2	–	0	7	–	3	–	0
SMU	4	–	2	–	0	6	–	3	–	1
Texas	3	–	3	–	0	5	–	4	–	0
Arkansas	2	–	3	–	1	4	–	5	–	1
TCU	1	–	5	–	0	3	–	7	–	0
Rice	0	–	5	–	1	1	–	9	–	1
$ – Conference champion; Rankings from AP Poll

The 1939 Rice Owls football team was an American football team that represented Rice Institute as a member of the Southwest Conference (SWC) during the 1939 college football season. In its sixth season under head coach Jimmy Kitts, the team compiled a 1–9–1 record (0–5–1 against SWC opponents) and was outscored by a total of 143 to 77.

Rice was ranked at No. 70 (out of 609 teams) in the final Litkenhous Ratings for 1939.

== Schedule ==
Date	Opponent	Site	Result	Attendance	Source
September 30	Vanderbilt*	Rice Field; Houston, TX	L 12–13	20,000	
October 7	Centenary*	Rice Field; Houston, TX	W 13–0		
October 14	at LSU*	Tiger Stadium; Baton Rouge, LA	L 0–7	28,000	
October 21	Sam Houston State*	Rice Field; Houston, TX	L 8–9		
October 28	at Texas	War Memorial Stadium; Austin, TX (rivalry)	L 12–26		
November 4	at Fordham*	Polo Grounds; New York, NY	L 7–13	19,971	
November 11	Arkansas	Rice Field; Houston, TX	T 12–12		
November 18	No. 2 Texas A&M	Rice Field; Houston, TX	L 0–19	25,000	
November 25	at TCU	Amon G. Carter Stadium; Fort Worth, TX	L 0–21		
December 2	Baylor	Rice Field; Houston, TX	L 7–10		
December 9	at SMU	Ownby Stadium; University Park, TX (rivalry)	L 6–13		
*Non-conference game; Rankings from AP Poll released prior to the game
