= 1939 New Mexico Lobos football team =

American college football season

1939 New Mexico Lobos football
- Conference: Border Conference
- Record: 8–2 (4–2 Border)
- Head coach: Ted Shipkey (3rd season)
- Home stadium: Hilltop Stadium

1939 Border Conference football standings
	Conf.					Overall
Team	W		L		T	W		L		T
Arizona State $	4	–	0	–	0	8	–	2	–	1
New Mexico	4	–	2	–	0	8	–	2	–	0
Texas Tech	2	–	1	–	0	5	–	5	–	1
Texas Mines	3	–	2	–	0	5	–	4	–	0
Arizona	1	–	2	–	0	6	–	4	–	0
New Mexico A&M	1	–	4	–	0	3	–	6	–	0
Arizona State–Flagstaff	0	–	4	–	0	1	–	6	–	1
$ – Conference champion

The 1939 New Mexico Lobos football team represented the University of New Mexico as a member of the Border Conference during the 1939 college football season. In their third season under head coach Ted Shipkey, the Lobos compiled an overall record of 8–2 record with a mark of 4–2 against conference opponents, placing second in the Border Conference, and outscored all opponents by a total of 167 to 98.

New Mexico was ranked at No. 126 (out of 609 teams) in the final Litkenhous Ratings for 1939.

== Schedule ==
Date	Opponent	Site	Result	Attendance	Source
September 22	Silver City Teachers*	Hilltop Stadium; Albuquerque, NM	W 29–7	5,000	
September 29	Wyoming*	Hilltop Stadium; Albuquerque, NM	W 34–7		
October 6	at Denver*	DU Stadium; Denver, CO	W 7–6	13,000	
October 13	Texas Mines	Hilltop Stadium; Albuquerque, NM	W 14–0		
October 21	at Texas Tech	Tech Field; Lubbock, TX	L 7–19	9,000	
October 27	Arizona State–Flagstaff	Hilltop Stadium; Albuquerque, NM	W 33–0		
November 10	at New Mexico A&M	Quesenberry Field; Las Cruces, NM (rivalry)	W 9–6	6,000	
November 18	at Arizona State	Goodwin Stadium; Tempe, AZ	L 6–28	10,000	
November 25	Arizona^{†}	Hilltop Stadium; Albuquerque, NM (rivalry)	W 7–6	6,000	
November 30	Colorado A&M*	Hilltop Stadium; Albuquerque, NM	W 21–19	5,500	
*Non-conference game; ^{†}Homecoming
