= 1939 North Texas State Teachers Eagles football team =

American college football season

1939 North Texas State Teachers Eagles football

LSC champion
- Conference: Lone Star Conference
- Record: 6–1 (4–0 LSC)
- Head coach: Jack Sisco (11th season)
- Home stadium: Eagle Field

1939 Lone Star Conference football standings
	Conf.					Overall
Team	W		L		T	W		L		T
North Texas State $	4	–	0	–	0	6	–	1	–	0
Sam Houston State	2	–	1	–	1	6	–	2	–	2
East Texas State	2	–	2	–	0	7	–	3	–	0
Stephen F. Austin	1	–	3	–	0	3	–	4	–	2
Southwest Texas State	0	–	3	–	1	3	–	5	–	2
$ – Conference champion

The 1939 North Texas State Teachers Eagles football team was an American football team that represented the North Texas State Teachers College (now known as the University of North Texas) during the 1939 college football season as a member of the Lone Star Conference. In their 11th year under head coach Jack Sisco, the team compiled a 6–1 record.

== Schedule ==
Date	Opponent	Site	Result	Source
September 23	vs. Abilene Christian*	Sweetwater H.S. Stadium; Sweetwater, TX	W 9–0	
October 7	at SMU*	Ownby Stadium; University Park, TX (rivalry)	L 0–16	
October 20	at Stephen F. Austin	Nacogdoches, TX	W 14–0	
October 29	Sam Houston State	Eagle Field; Denton, TX	W 24–13	
November 3	at Southwest Texas State	Evans Field; San Marcos, TX	W 26–0	
November 11	Austin*	Eagle Field; Denton, TX	W 27–0	
November 18	East Texas State	Eagle Field; Denton, TX	W 16–13	
*Non-conference game
