= 1939 Drake Bulldogs football team =

American college football season

1939 Drake Bulldogs football
- Conference: Missouri Valley Conference
- Record: 5–5 (2–3 MVC)
- Head coach: Vee Green (7th season)
- Home stadium: Drake Stadium

1939 Missouri Valley Conference football standings
| | Conf. | | | | | Overall |
| Team | W | | L | | T | W | | L | | T |
|---|---|---|---|---|---|---|---|---|---|---|
| Washington University $ | 4 | – | 1 | – | 0 | 6 | – | 3 | – | 1 |
| Oklahoma A&M | 3 | – | 1 | – | 0 | 5 | – | 4 | – | 1 |
| Tulsa | 2 | – | 1 | – | 1 | 4 | – | 5 | – | 1 |
| Drake | 2 | – | 3 | – | 0 | 5 | – | 5 | – | 0 |
| Saint Louis | 1 | – | 2 | – | 1 | 5 | – | 3 | – | 2 |
| Creighton | 2 | – | 4 | – | 0 | 4 | – | 5 | – | 0 |
| Washburn | 1 | – | 3 | – | 0 | 6 | – | 4 | – | 0 |
$ – Conference champion

The 1939 Drake Bulldogs football team represented Drake University in the Missouri Valley Conference (MVC) during the 1939 college football season. In its seventh season under head coach Vee Green, the team compiled a 5–5 record (2–3 against MVC opponents), finished fourth in the MVC, and was outscored by a total of 104 to 83.

Drake was ranked at No. 121 (out of 609 teams) in the final Litkenhous Ratings for 1939.

== Schedule ==
| Date | Opponent | Site | Result | Attendance | Source |
|---|---|---|---|---|---|
| September 29 | Kansas* | Drake Stadium; Des Moines, IA | W 12–6 | 10,000 | |
| October 7 | Grinnell* | Drake Stadium; Des Moines, IA | W 13–0 | | |
| October 14 | at Creighton | Creighton Stadium; Omaha, NE | L 0–7 | 12,000 | |
| October 21 | Iowa State*^{†} | Drake Stadium; Des Moines, IA | W 7–0 | 13,500 | |
| October 28 | at Saint Louis | Walsh Stadium; St. Louis, MO | W 12–0 | | |
| November 4 | Washburn | Drake Stadium; Des Moines, IA | W 20–7 | | |
| November 10 | at Miami (FL)* | Burdine Stadium; Miami, FL | L 6–33 | 16,415 | |
| November 18 | Washington University | Drake Stadium; Des Moines, IA | L 13–25 | 7,000 | |
| November 25 | at Tulsa | Skelly Field; Tulsa, OK | L 0–14 | 5,000 | |
| November 30 | at San Jose State* | Spartan Stadium; San Jose, CA | L 0–12 | 13,000 | |
*Non-conference game; ^{†}Homecoming
