= 1939 Saint Louis Billikens football team =

American college football season

1939 Saint Louis Billikens football
- Conference: Missouri Valley Conference
- Record: 5–3–2 (1–1–1 MVC)
- Head coach: Cecil Muellerleile (6th season)
- Home stadium: Walsh Stadium

1939 Missouri Valley Conference football standings
	Conf.					Overall
Team	W		L		T	W		L		T
Washington University $	4	–	1	–	0	6	–	3	–	1
Oklahoma A&M	3	–	1	–	0	5	–	4	–	1
Tulsa	2	–	1	–	1	4	–	5	–	1
Drake	2	–	3	–	0	5	–	5	–	0
Saint Louis	1	–	2	–	1	5	–	3	–	2
Creighton	2	–	4	–	0	4	–	5	–	0
Washburn	1	–	3	–	0	6	–	4	–	0
$ – Conference champion

The 1939 Saint Louis Billikens football team was an American football team that represented Saint Louis University as a member of the Missouri Valley Conference (MVC) during the 1939 college football season. In its sixth and final season under head coach Cecil Muellerleile, the team compiled a 5–3–2 record and outscored opponents by a total of 103 to 95.

Saint Louis was ranked at No. 147 (out of 609 teams) in the final Litkenhous Ratings for 1939.

The team played its home games at Edward J. Walsh Memorial Stadium in St. Louis.

== Schedule ==
Date	Opponent	Site	Result	Attendance	Source
September 29	Missouri Mines*	Walsh Memorial Stadium; St. Louis, MO	W 13–0		
October 6	Bradley*	Walsh Memorial Stadium; St. Louis, MO	T 0–0	4,639	
October 13	Wichita*	Walsh Memorial Stadium; St. Louis, MO	W 7–0	4,956	
October 21	at No. 17 Ole Miss*	Hemingway Stadium; Oxford, MS	L 0–42		
October 28	Drake	Walsh Memorial Stadium; St. Louis, MO	L 0–12		
November 4	at Creighton	Creighton Stadium; Omaha, NE	W 21–14		
November 10	Wyoming*	Walsh Memorial Stadium; St. Louis, MO	W 39–6	3,598	
November 18	at Tulsa*	Skelly Field; Tulsa, OK	T 0–0	6,500	
November 25	South Dakota*	Walsh Memorial Stadium; St. Louis, MO	W 6–0		
December 2	at Washington University	Francis Field; St. Louis, MO	L 17–21	12,000	
*Non-conference game; Rankings from AP Poll released prior to the game
