= 1939 Texas Mines Miners football team =

American college football season

1939 Texas Mines Miners football
- Conference: Border Conference
- Record: 5–4 (3–2 Border)
- Head coach: Mack Saxon (11th season)
- Home stadium: Kidd Field

1939 Border Conference football standings
	Conf.					Overall
Team	W		L		T	W		L		T
Arizona State $	4	–	0	–	0	8	–	2	–	1
New Mexico	4	–	2	–	0	8	–	2	–	0
Texas Tech	2	–	1	–	0	5	–	5	–	1
Texas Mines	3	–	2	–	0	5	–	4	–	0
Arizona	1	–	2	–	0	6	–	4	–	0
New Mexico A&M	1	–	4	–	0	3	–	6	–	0
Arizona State–Flagstaff	0	–	4	–	0	1	–	6	–	1
$ – Conference champion

The 1939 Texas Mines Miners football team was an American football team that represented Texas School of Mines (now known as University of Texas at El Paso) as a member of the Border Conference during the 1939 college football season. In its 11th season under head coach Mack Saxon, the team compiled a 5–4 record (3–2 against Border Conference opponents), finished fourth in the conference, and outscored opponents by a total of 110 to 71.

Texas Mines was ranked at No. 108 (out of 609 teams) in the final Litkenhous Ratings for 1939.

== Schedule ==
Date	Opponent	Site	Result	Attendance	Source
September 23	Texas Tech	Kidd Field; El Paso, TX	W 7–2		
September 30	at Fresno State*	Fresno State College Stadium; Fresno, CA	L 7–0	8,597–9,000	
October 7	Hardin–Simmons*	Kidd Field; El Paso, TX	L 0–12	5,000	
October 13	at New Mexico	Hilltop Stadium; Albuquerque, NM	L 0–14		
October 21	Wichita*	Kidd Field; El Paso, TX	W 17–0		
October 28	at Arizona State	Goodwin Stadium; Tempe, AZ	L 7–27		
November 11	Arizona^{†}	Kidd Field; El Paso, TX	W 14–6	8,000	
November 18	Louisiana Tech*	Kidd Field; El Paso, TX	W 27–0	5,500	
November 25	at New Mexico A&M	Quesenberry Field; Las Cruces, NM (rivalry)	W 34–0		
*Non-conference game; ^{†}Homecoming
