= 1939 Colorado Buffaloes football team =

American college football season

1939 Colorado Buffaloes football

MSC champion
- Conference: Mountain States Conference
- Record: 5–3 (5–1 MSC)
- Head coach: Bunny Oakes (5th season)
- Captain: Game captains
- Home stadium: Colorado Stadium

1939 Mountain States Conference football standings
	Conf.					Overall
Team	W		L		T	W		L		T
Colorado $	5	–	1	–	0	5	–	3	–	0
Utah	4	–	1	–	1	6	–	1	–	2
Denver	3	–	2	–	1	5	–	3	–	1
BYU	2	–	2	–	2	5	–	2	–	2
Utah State	2	–	3	–	1	3	–	4	–	1
Colorado A&M	2	–	4	–	0	2	–	7	–	0
Wyoming	0	–	5	–	1	0	–	7	–	1
$ – Conference champion

The 1939 Colorado Buffaloes football team was an American football team that represented the University of Colorado as a member of the Mountain States Conference (MSC) during the 1939 college football season. Led by Bunny Oakes in his fifth and final season as head coach, the Buffaloes compiled an overall record of 5–3 with a mark of 5–1 in conference play, winning the MSC title.

Colorado was ranked at No. 136 (out of 609 teams) in the final Litkenhous Ratings for 1939.

== Schedule ==
Date	Opponent	Site	Result	Attendance	Source
September 30	at Missouri*	Memorial Stadium; Columbia, MO	L 0–30		
October 7	Utah State	Colorado Stadium; Boulder, CO	L 6–16		
October 14	at Kansas State*	Memorial Stadium; Manhattan, KS (rivalry)	L 0–20	7,000	
October 21	Colorado A&M^{†}	Colorado Stadium; Boulder, CO (rivalry)	W 13–0	11,000	
October 28	at Wyoming	Corbett Field; Laramie, WY	W 27–7		
November 4	at Utah	Ute Stadium; Salt Lake City, UT (rivalry)	W 21–14	13,000	
November 18	at BYU	BYU Stadium; Provo, UT	W 12–6	7,500	
November 30	Denver	Colorado Stadium; Boulder, CO	W 27–17	18,000	
*Non-conference game; ^{†}Homecoming; Source:
