= 1939 Wichita Shockers football team =

American college football season

1939 Wichita Shockers football

CIC champion
- Conference: Central Intercollegiate Conference
- Record: 5–3–2 (4–0–1 CIC)
- Head coach: Al Gebert (10th season)

1939 Central Intercollegiate Conference football standings
	Conf.					Overall
Team	W		L		T	W		L		T
Wichita $	4	–	0	–	1	5	–	3	–	2
Emporia State	3	–	2	–	0	6	–	3	–	0
St. Benedict's	3	–	2	–	0	5	–	3	–	0
Pittsburg State	2	–	1	–	2	3	–	4	–	2
Fort Hays State	1	–	3	–	1	2	–	5	–	2
Southwestern (KS)	0	–	5	–	0	1	–	8	–	0
$ – Conference champion

The 1939 Wichita Shockers football team was an American football team that represented Wichita University (now known as Wichita State University) in the Central Intercollegiate Conference during the 1939 college football season. In their 10th season under head coach Al Gebert, the Shockers compiled a 5–3–2 record (4–0–1 against conference opponents), won the CIC championship, and outscored opponents by a total of 111 to 68.

Wichita was ranked at No. 151 (out of 609 teams) in the final Litkenhous Ratings for 1939.

== Schedule ==
Date	Opponent	Site	Result	Attendance	Source
September 30	at Tulsa*	Skelly Field; Tulsa, OK	L 6–23	10,000	
October 7	Southwestern (KS)	Wichita, KS	W 32–0	5,000	
October 13	at Saint Louis*	Walsh Memorial Stadium; St. Louis, MO	L 0–7	4,956	
October 21	at Texas Mines*	Kidd Field; El Paso, TX	L 0–14		
October 28	Pittsburg State	Wichita, KS	T 0–0	5,000	
November 4	St. Benedict's	Wichita, KS	W 33–6		
November 11	at Emporia State	Emporia, KS	W 7–6		
November 18	Oklahoma A&M*^{†}	Wichita, KS	T 0–0	4,000	
November 24	Fort Hays State	Wichita, KS	W 26–6	2,000	
November 30	Washburn*	Wichita, KS	W 7–6		
*Non-conference game; ^{†}Homecoming
