= 1939 Creighton Bluejays football team =

American college football season

1939 Creighton Bluejays football
- Conference: Missouri Valley Conference
- Record: 4–5 (2–4 MVC)
- Head coach: Marchmont Schwartz (5th season)
- Home stadium: Creighton Stadium

1939 Missouri Valley Conference football standings
	Conf.					Overall
Team	W		L		T	W		L		T
Washington University $	4	–	1	–	0	6	–	3	–	1
Oklahoma A&M	3	–	1	–	0	5	–	4	–	1
Tulsa	2	–	1	–	1	4	–	5	–	1
Drake	2	–	3	–	0	5	–	5	–	0
Saint Louis	1	–	2	–	1	5	–	3	–	2
Creighton	2	–	4	–	0	4	–	5	–	0
Washburn	1	–	3	–	0	6	–	4	–	0
$ – Conference champion

The 1939 Creighton Bluejays football team was an American football team that represented Creighton University as a member of the Missouri Valley Conference (MVC) during the 1939 college football season. In its fifth and final season under head coach Marchmont Schwartz, the team compiled a 4–5 record (2–4 against MVC opponents) and outscored opponents by a total of 164 to 43.

Creighton was ranked at No. 102 (out of 609 teams) in the final Litkenhous Ratings for 1939.

The team played its home games at Creighton Stadium in Omaha, Nebraska.

== Schedule ==
Date	Opponent	Site	Result	Attendance	Source
September 30	Iowa State Teachers*	Creighton Stadium; Omaha, NE	W 26–0		
October 7	Tulsa	Creighton Stadium; Omaha, NE	L 14–21	12,000	
October 14	Drake	Creighton Stadium; Omaha, NE	W 7–0	12,000	
October 20	at Washington University	Francis Field; St. Louis, MO	L 12–42	7,000	
October 28	Loyola (LA)*	Creighton Stadium; Omaha, NE	W 21–13		
November 4	Saint Louis	Creighton Stadium; Omaha, NE	L 14–21		
November 18	Washburn	Creighton Stadium; Omaha, NE	W 47–0		
November 25	at Oklahoma A&M	Lewis Field; Stillwater, OK	L 9–20		
December 3	vs. San Francisco*	Sacramento Stadium; Sacramento, CA	L 14–26	9,900	
*Non-conference game
