= 1939 Wyoming Cowboys football team =

American college football season

1939 Wyoming Cowboys football
- Conference: Mountain States Conference
- Record: 0–7–1 (0–5–1 MSC)
- Head coach: Joel Hunt (1st season)
- Captain: None
- Home stadium: Corbett Field

1939 Mountain States Conference football standings
	Conf.					Overall
Team	W		L		T	W		L		T
Colorado $	5	–	1	–	0	5	–	3	–	0
Utah	4	–	1	–	1	6	–	1	–	2
Denver	3	–	2	–	1	5	–	3	–	1
BYU	2	–	2	–	2	5	–	2	–	2
Utah State	2	–	3	–	1	3	–	4	–	1
Colorado A&M	2	–	4	–	0	2	–	7	–	0
Wyoming	0	–	5	–	1	0	–	7	–	1
$ – Conference champion

The 1939 Wyoming Cowboys football team represented the University of Wyoming in the Mountain States Conference (MSC) during the 1939 college football season. In its first and only season under head coach Joel Hunt, the team compiled a 0–7–1 record (0–5–1 against MSC opponents), finished last in the conference, and was outscored by a total of 241 to 47.

== Schedule ==
Date	Opponent	Site	Result	Attendance	Source
September 29	at New Mexico*	Hilltop Stadium; Albuquerque, NM	L 7–34		
October 7	at Utah	Ute Stadium; Salt Lake City, UT	L 0–60		
October 13	at Denver	Denver University Stadium; Denver, CO	L 7–32	8,000	
October 28	Colorado	Corbett Field; Laramie, WY	L 7–27		
November 4	at Colorado A&M	Colorado Field; Fort Collins, CO (rivalry)	L 0–22	4,000	
November 10	at Saint Louis*	Walsh Memorial Stadium; St. Louis, MO	L 6–39	3,598	
November 18	Utah State^{†}	Corbett Field; Laramie, WY (rivalry)	L 13–20	5,000	
November 25	BYU	Corbett Field; Laramie, WY	T 7–7	1,500	
*Non-conference game; ^{†}Homecoming
