= 1939 Arizona Wildcats football team =

American college football season

1939 Arizona Wildcats football
- Conference: Border Conference
- Record: 6–4 (1–2 Border)
- Head coach: Mike Casteel (1st season)
- Captain: Tom Hargis
- Home stadium: Arizona Stadium

1939 Border Conference football standings
	Conf.					Overall
Team	W		L		T	W		L		T
Arizona State $	4	–	0	–	0	8	–	2	–	1
New Mexico	4	–	2	–	0	8	–	2	–	0
Texas Tech	2	–	1	–	0	5	–	5	–	1
Texas Mines	3	–	2	–	0	5	–	4	–	0
Arizona	1	–	2	–	0	6	–	4	–	0
New Mexico A&M	1	–	4	–	0	3	–	6	–	0
Arizona State–Flagstaff	0	–	4	–	0	1	–	6	–	1
$ – Conference champion

The 1939 Arizona Wildcats football team represented the University of Arizona in the Border Conference during the 1939 college football season. In their first season under head coach Mike Casteel, the Wildcats compiled a 6–4 record (1–2 against Border opponents), finished in fourth place in the conference, and were outscored by their opponents, 113 to 109. The team captain was Tom Hargis. The team played its home games at Arizona Stadium in Tucson, Arizona.

== Schedule ==
Date	Opponent	Site	Result	Attendance	Source
September 23	Pomona*	Arizona Stadium; Tucson, AZ	W 21–0		
September 30	at Minnesota*	Memorial Stadium; Minneapolis, MN	L 0–62	42,875	
October 14	New Mexico A&M	Arizona Stadium; Tucson, AZ	W 20–3	9,000	
October 28	at Marquette*	Marquette Stadium; Milwaukee, WI	L 6–13	10,000	
November 4	Centenary*	Arizona Stadium; Tucson, AZ	W 7–0		
November 11	at Texas Mines	Kidd Field; El Paso, TX	L 6–14	8,000	
November 18	Pacific (CA)*	Arizona Stadium; Tucson, AZ	W 12–7	9,000	
November 25	at New Mexico	Hilltop Stadium; Albuquerque, NM (rivalry)	L 6–7	6,000	
November 30	Montana*	Arizona Stadium; Tucson, AZ	W 6–0	9,000	
December 9	vs. Loyola (CA)*	Phoenix Union High School; Phoenix, AZ	W 25–7	10,000	
*Non-conference game
