= 1939 Southwest Texas State Bobcats football team =

American college football season

1939 Southwest Texas State Bobcats football
- Conference: Lone Star Conference
- Record: 3–5–2 (0–3–1 LSC)
- Head coach: Joe Bailey Cheaney (5th season)
- Home stadium: Evans Field

1939 Lone Star Conference football standings
	Conf.					Overall
Team	W		L		T	W		L		T
North Texas State $	4	–	0	–	0	6	–	1	–	0
Sam Houston State	2	–	1	–	1	6	–	2	–	2
East Texas State	2	–	2	–	0	7	–	3	–	0
Stephen F. Austin	1	–	3	–	0	3	–	4	–	2
Southwest Texas State	0	–	3	–	1	3	–	5	–	2
$ – Conference champion

The 1939 Southwest Texas State Bobcats football team was an American football team that represented Southwest Texas State Teachers College (now known as Texas State University) during the 1939 college football season as a member of the Lone Star Conference (LSC). In their fifth year under head coach Joe Bailey Cheaney, the team compiled an overall record of 3–5–2 with a mark of 0–3–1 in conference play.

== Schedule ==
Date	Opponent	Site	Result	Source
September 16	Randolph Field*	Evans Field; San Marcos, TX	W 20–0	
September 22	at Howard Payne*	Brownwood, TX	L 0–13	
September 29	St. Edward's*	Evans Field; San Marcos, TX	L 0–6	
October 6	at Schreiner*	Kerrville, TX	W 6–0	
October 14	at Southwestern (TX)*	Snyder Field; Georgetown, TX	W 0–6	
October 20	Texas A&I*	Evans Field; San Marcos, TX	T 0–0	
October 27	Stephen F. Austin	Evans Field; San Marcos, TX	L 6–13	
November 3	North Texas State	Evans Field; San Marcos, TX	L 0–26	
November 11	at East Texas State	Commerce, TX	L 7–19	
November 17	at Sam Houston State	Pritchett Field; Huntsville, TX (rivalry)	T 0–0	
*Non-conference game
