= Cecil Muellerleile =

American football player, coach, and administrator (1907–1972)

- Muellerleile pictured in The Archive 1936, Saint Louis yearbook

Biographical details
- Born: March 14, 1907
- Died: March 1972 (aged 64–65)

Playing career
- 1929–1931: Saint Louis

Coaching career (HC unless noted)
- 1934–1939: Saint Louis

Administrative career (AD unless noted)
- 1934–1940: Saint Louis

Head coaching record
- Overall: 28–23–8

Cecil E. Muellerleile (March 14, 1907 – March 1972) was an American football player, coach, and college athletics administrator. He served as the head football coach at Saint Louis University from 1934 to 1939, compiling a record of 28–23–8. Muellerleile played college football at Saint Louis from 1929 to 1931. He was married to Margaret Keaney, with whom he had five children including actress Marianne Muellerleile.

== Head coaching record ==
Year	Team	Overall	Conference	Standing	Bowl/playoffs
Saint Louis Billikens (Independent) (1933–1936)
1934	Saint Louis	3–3–2			
1935	Saint Louis	5–6			
1936	Saint Louis	5–4–1			
Saint Louis Billikens (Missouri Valley Conference) (1937–1939)
1937	Saint Louis	7–2–1	2–1	3rd	
1938	Saint Louis	3–5–2	1–1–1	4th	
1939	Saint Louis	5–3–2	1–2–1	5th	
Saint Louis:		28–23–8	4–4–2		
Total:		28–23–8			
