= 1939 Sam Houston State Bearkats football team =

American college football season

1939 Sam Houston State Bearkats football
- Conference: Lone Star Conference
- Record: 7–1–2 (4–1–1 LSC)
- Head coach: Puny Wilson (2nd season)
- Home stadium: Pritchett Field

1939 Lone Star Conference football standings
	Conf.					Overall
Team	W		L		T	W		L		T
North Texas State $	4	–	0	–	0	6	–	1	–	0
Sam Houston State	2	–	1	–	1	6	–	2	–	2
East Texas State	2	–	2	–	0	7	–	3	–	0
Stephen F. Austin	1	–	3	–	0	3	–	4	–	2
Southwest Texas State	0	–	3	–	1	3	–	5	–	2
$ – Conference champion

The 1939 Sam Houston State Bearkats football team represented Sam Houston State Teachers College (now known as Sam Houston State University) as a member of the Lone Star Conference (LSC) during the 1939 college football season. Led by second-year head coach Puny Wilson, the Bearkats compiled an overall record of 7–1–2 with a mark of 4–1–1 in conference play, and finished second in the LSC.

== Schedule ==
Date	Opponent	Site	Result	Source
September 22	Trinity (TX)*	Pritchett Field; Huntsville, TX	W 15–12	
September 28	at Lamar*	Greenie Stadium; Beaumont, TX	W 20–6	
October 7	Mississippi State Teachers*	Pritchett Field; Huntsville, TX	T 7–7	
October 14	at Texas A&I*	Kingsville, TX	W 7–0	
October 21	at Rice*	Rice Field; Houston, TX	W 9–8	
October 29	at North Texas State	Eagle Field; Denton, TX	L 13–24	
November 4	East Texas State	Pritchett Field; Huntsville, TX	W 15–0	
November 10	Texas Wesleyan*	Pritchett Field; Huntsville, TX	W 29–0	
November 17	Southwest Texas State	Pritchett Field; Huntsville, TX (rivalry)	T 0–0	
November 25	at Stephen F. Austin	Birdwell Field; Nacogdoches, TX (rivalry)	W 14–0	
*Non-conference game
