= 1939 Arizona State–Flagstaff Lumberjacks football team =

American college football season

1939 Arizona State–Flagstaff Lumberjacks football
- Conference: Border Conference
- Record: 1–6–1 (0–4 Border)
- Head coach: Garrett Arbelbide (4th season)
- Home stadium: Skidmore Field

1939 Border Conference football standings
	Conf.					Overall
Team	W		L		T	W		L		T
Arizona State $	4	–	0	–	0	8	–	2	–	1
New Mexico	4	–	2	–	0	8	–	2	–	0
Texas Tech	2	–	1	–	0	5	–	5	–	1
Texas Mines	3	–	2	–	0	5	–	4	–	0
Arizona	1	–	2	–	0	6	–	4	–	0
New Mexico A&M	1	–	4	–	0	3	–	6	–	0
Arizona State–Flagstaff	0	–	4	–	0	1	–	6	–	1
$ – Conference champion

The 1939 Arizona State–Flagstaff Lumberjacks football team represented Arizona State Teachers College at Flagstaff (now known as Northern Arizona University) as a member of the Border Conference during the 1939 college football season. Led by fourth-year head coach Garrett Arbelbide, the Lumberjacks compiled an overall record of 1–6–1, with a conference record of 0–4, and finished seventh in the Border.

== Schedule ==
Date	Opponent	Site	Result	Attendance	Source
September 16	Silver City Teachers*	Skidmore Field; Flagstaff, AZ	T 12–12		
September 23	BYU*	Skidmore Field; Flagstaff, AZ	L 0–25		
September 30	Nevada*	Skidmore Field; Flagstaff, AZ	W 9–7		
October 7	New Mexico A&M	Skidmore Field; Flagstaff, AZ	L 13–26		
October 14	at Texas Tech	Tech Field; Lubbock, TX	L 0–54		
October 21	Whittier*	Skidmore Field; Flagstaff, AZ	L 13–27	1,000	
October 27	at New Mexico	Hilltop Stadium; Albuquerque, NM	L 0–33		
November 11	at Arizona State	Goodwin Stadium; Tempe, AZ	L 6–41		
*Non-conference game
