= Ned McDonald =

American football player and coach (1910–1977)

Biographical details
- Born: January 2, 1910; Caldwell, Texas, U.S.
- Died: February 8, 1977 (aged 67); Keene, Virginia, U.S.
- Education: University of Texas

Playing career
- 1937–1939: Texas

Coaching career (HC unless noted)
- 1946–1952: Virginia (line)
- 1953–1955: Virginia
- 1964–1973: Virginia (line)

Head coaching record
- Overall: 5–23

Ned L. McDonald (January 2, 1910 – February 8, 1977) was an American football coach. He served as the head football coach at the University of Virginia from 1953 to 1955.

McDonald played college football as a two-way end at the University of Texas from 1937 to 1939 under head coach Dana X. Bible, captaining in 1939 with Park Myers.

After graduating from Texas in 1940, McDonald coached high school football in Orange, Texas and then served in the Pacific in the Navy during World War II.

In 1946 he went to Virginia to serve on the coaching staff of Art Guepe and became head coach in 1953 when Guepe took the head coaching job at Vanderbilt. He led the team for three years that overlapped the school's move to the ACC.

After failing to produce a winning season he was pressured to resign, which he did in late 1955 and he then went into private business in Charlottesville after the 1955 season. He continued coaching as a frequent head coach of high school all-star games, coaching the West squad four times in the "East-West" game and the North in 1959 and South in 1960 of the Shrine North-South game, and then as a part-time coach at Woodberry Forest School. In 1964 he returned to UVA as the line coach and stayed, through three head coaches, until 1973.

He retired, but continued to serve as a part-time instructor in UVA's service physical education department.

McDonald died of a heart attack during a hunting trip in 1977.

UVA's award for the most outstanding defensive player is named in his honor.

== Head coaching record ==
Year	Team	Overall	Conference	Standing	Bowl/playoffs
Virginia Cavaliers (Independent) (1953)
1953	Virginia	1–8			
Virginia Cavaliers (Atlantic Coast Conference) (1954–1955)
1954	Virginia	3–6	0–2	7th	
1955	Virginia	1–9	0–4	8th	
Virginia:		5–23	0–6		
Total:		5–23			
