= 1939 New Mexico A&M Aggies football team =

American college football season

1939 New Mexico A&M Aggies football
- Conference: Border Conference
- Record: 3–6 (1–4 Border)
- Head coach: Jerry Hines (11th season)
- Home stadium: Quesenberry Field

1939 Border Conference football standings
	Conf.					Overall
Team	W		L		T	W		L		T
Arizona State $	4	–	0	–	0	8	–	2	–	1
New Mexico	4	–	2	–	0	8	–	2	–	0
Texas Tech	2	–	1	–	0	5	–	5	–	1
Texas Mines	3	–	2	–	0	5	–	4	–	0
Arizona	1	–	2	–	0	6	–	4	–	0
New Mexico A&M	1	–	4	–	0	3	–	6	–	0
Arizona State–Flagstaff	0	–	4	–	0	1	–	6	–	1
$ – Conference champion

The 1939 New Mexico A&M Aggies football team was an American football team that represented New Mexico College of Agriculture and Mechanical Arts (now known as New Mexico State University) as a member of the Border Conference during the 1939 college football season. In its eleventh and final year under head coach Jerry Hines, the team compiled a 3–6 record (1–4 against conference opponents), finished sixth in the conference, and was outscored by a total of 141 to 92. The team played home games at Quesenberry Field in Las Cruces, New Mexico.

New Mexico A&M was ranked No. 239 (out of 609 teams) in the final Litkenhous Ratings for 1939.

== Schedule ==
Date	Opponent	Site	Result	Attendance	Source
September 22	Fort Hays State*	Quesenberry Field; Las Cruces, NM	W 33–7		
September 28	at Arkansas State Teachers*	Estes Stadium; Conway, AR	W 12–3		
October 7	at Arizona State–Flagstaff	Skidmore Field; Flagstaff, AZ	W 26–13		
October 14	at Arizona	Arizona Stadium; Tucson, AZ	L 3–20	9,000	
October 20	Arizona State	Quesenberry Field; Las Cruces, NM	L 0–7		
November 4	at Oklahoma A&M*	Lewis Field; Stillwater, OK	L 0–20	6,000	
November 10	New Mexico^{†}	Quesenberry Field; Las Cruces, NM (rivalry)	L 6–9	6,000	
November 17	Hardin–Simmons*	Quesenberry Field; Las Cruces, NM	L 13–28		
November 25	Texas Mines	Quesenberry Field; Las Cruces, NM (rivalry)	L 0–34		
*Non-conference game; ^{†}Homecoming
