= 1939 SMU Mustangs football team =

American college football season

1939 SMU Mustangs football
- Conference: Southwest Conference
- Record: 6–3–1 (4–2 SWC)
- Head coach: Matty Bell (5th season)
- Captain: Chelsea Crouch
- Home stadium: Ownby Stadium

1939 Southwest Conference football standings
	Conf.					Overall
Team	W		L		T	W		L		T
No. 1 Texas A&M $	6	–	0	–	0	11	–	0	–	0
Baylor	4	–	2	–	0	7	–	3	–	0
SMU	4	–	2	–	0	6	–	3	–	1
Texas	3	–	3	–	0	5	–	4	–	0
Arkansas	2	–	3	–	1	4	–	5	–	1
TCU	1	–	5	–	0	3	–	7	–	0
Rice	0	–	5	–	1	1	–	9	–	1
$ – Conference champion; Rankings from AP Poll

The 1939 SMU Mustangs football team was an American football team that represented Southern Methodist University (SMU) as a member of the Southwest Conference (SWC) during the 1939 college football season. In their fifth season under head coach Matty Bell, the Mustangs compiled a 6–3–1 record (4–2 against conference opponents) and were outscored by a total of 118 to 60.

SMU was not ranked in the final AP poll, but it was ranked at No. 12 in the final Litkenhous Ratings for 1939, and at No. 22 in the 1939 Williamson System ratings.

The team played its home games at Ownby Stadium in the University Park suburb of Dallas.

== Schedule ==
Date	Opponent	Rank	Site	Result	Attendance	Source
September 30	at Oklahoma		Memorial Stadium; Norman, OK	T 7–7	26,205	
October 7	North Texas State Teachers*		Ownby Stadium; University Park, TX (rivalry)	W 16–0		
October 14	at Notre Dame*		Notre Dame Stadium; South Bend, IN	L 19–20	29,730	
October 21	Marquette*	No. 18	Cotton Bowl; Dallas, TX	W 16–0	8,500	
November 4	Texas	No. 16	Ownby Stadium; University Park, TX	W 10–0	23,000	
November 11	at No. 2 Texas A&M	No. 13	Kyle Field; College Station, TX	L 2–6	30,000	
November 17	at Arkansas	No. 17	Quigley Stadium; Little Rock, AR	L 0–14	8,000	
November 25	Baylor		Ownby Stadium; University Park, TX	W 21–0	14,000	
December 2	at TCU		Amon G. Carter Stadium; Fort Worth, TX	W 14–7	18,000	
December 9	Rice		Ownby Stadium; University Park, TX	W 13–6		
*Non-conference game; Rankings from AP Poll released prior to the game
