= 1939 Washington University Bears football team =

American college football season

1939 Washington University Bears football

MVC champion
- Conference: Missouri Valley Conference
- Record: 6–3–1 (4–1 MVC)
- Head coach: Jimmy Conzelman (8th season)
- Home stadium: Francis Field

1939 Missouri Valley Conference football standings
	Conf.					Overall
Team	W		L		T	W		L		T
Washington University $	4	–	1	–	0	6	–	3	–	1
Oklahoma A&M	3	–	1	–	0	5	–	4	–	1
Tulsa	2	–	1	–	1	4	–	5	–	1
Drake	2	–	3	–	0	5	–	5	–	0
Saint Louis	1	–	2	–	1	5	–	3	–	2
Creighton	2	–	4	–	0	4	–	5	–	0
Washburn	1	–	3	–	0	6	–	4	–	0
$ – Conference champion

The 1939 Washington University Bears football team represented Washington University in St. Louis as a member of the Missouri Valley Conference (MVC) during the 1939 college football season. In its eighth season under head coach Jimmy Conzelman, the team compiled a 6–3–1 record (4–1 against MVC opponents) and outscored opponents by a total of 172 to 103.

Washington University was not ranked in the final AP poll, but it was ranked at No. 44 in the 1939 Williamson System ratings, and at No. 81 in the Litkenhous Ratings.

The team played its home games at Francis Field in St. Louis.

== Schedule ==
Date	Opponent	Site	Result	Attendance	Source
September 30	at Northwest Missouri State*	Francis Field; St. Louis, MO	L 7–9		
October 7	at Washburn	Moore Bowl; Topeka, KS	L 20–26		
October 14	Missouri*	Francis Field; St. Louis, MO	L 0–14	10,000	
October 20	Creighton	Francis Field; St. Louis, MO	W 42–12	7,000	
October 28	at Butler*	Butler Bowl; Indianapolis, IN	T 6–6		
November 4	Washington and Lee*^{†}	Francis Field; St. Louis, MO	W 12–6	7,500	
November 11	Oklahoma A&M	Francis Field; St. Louis, MO	W 7–0		
November 18	at Drake	Drake Stadium; Des Moines, IA	W 25–13	7,000	
November 25	Missouri Mines*	Francis Field; St. Louis, MO	W 32–0	6,000	
December 1	Saint Louis	Francis Field; St. Louis, MO	W 21–17	12,000	
*Non-conference game; ^{†}Homecoming
