= 1939 Colorado A&M Aggies football team =

American college football season

1939 Colorado A&M Aggies football
- Conference: Mountain States Conference
- Record: 2–7 (2–4 MSC)
- Head coach: Harry W. Hughes (29th season)
- Home stadium: Colorado Field

1939 Mountain States Conference football standings
	Conf.					Overall
Team	W		L		T	W		L		T
Colorado $	5	–	1	–	0	5	–	3	–	0
Utah	4	–	1	–	1	6	–	1	–	2
Denver	3	–	2	–	1	5	–	3	–	1
BYU	2	–	2	–	2	5	–	2	–	2
Utah State	2	–	3	–	1	3	–	4	–	1
Colorado A&M	2	–	4	–	0	2	–	7	–	0
Wyoming	0	–	5	–	1	0	–	7	–	1
$ – Conference champion

The 1939 Colorado A&M Aggies football team was an American football team that represented Colorado A&M (now known as Colorado State University) in the Mountain States Conference (MSC) during the 1939 college football season. In their 29th season under head coach Harry W. Hughes, the Aggies compiled a 2–7 record (2–4 against MSC opponents), finished sixth in the MSC, and were outscored by a total of 128 to 89.

== Schedule ==
Date	Opponent	Site	Result	Attendance	Source
September 30	Colorado Mines*	Colorado Field; Fort Collins, CO	L 14–19	4,000	
October 7	at BYU	BYU Stadium; Provo, UT	L 12–13	3,000	
October 14	Kansas*^{†}	Colorado Field; Fort Collins, CO	L 0–7		
October 21	at Colorado	Colorado Stadium; Boulder, CO (rivalry)	L 0–13	11,000	
October 28	at Utah State	Aggie Stadium; Logan, UT	W 9–0	7,000	
November 4	Wyoming	Colorado Field; Fort Collins, CO (rivalry)	W 22–0	4,000	
November 11	at Denver	Denver University Stadium; Denver, CO	L 6–13	12,500	
November 18	Utah	Colorado Field; Fort Collins, CO	L 7–42	5,000	
November 30	at New Mexico*	Hilltop Stadium; Albuquerque, NM	L 19–21	5,500	
*Non-conference game; ^{†}Homecoming
