= 1939 Utah Utes football team =

American college football season

1939 Utah Utes football
- Conference: Mountain States Conference
- Record: 6–1–2 (4–1–1 MSC)
- Head coach: Ike Armstrong (15th season)
- Home stadium: Ute Stadium

1939 Mountain States Conference football standings
| | Conf. | | | | | Overall |
| Team | W | | L | | T | W | | L | | T |
|---|---|---|---|---|---|---|---|---|---|---|
| Colorado $ | 5 | – | 1 | – | 0 | 5 | – | 3 | – | 0 |
| Utah | 4 | – | 1 | – | 1 | 6 | – | 1 | – | 2 |
| Denver | 3 | – | 2 | – | 1 | 5 | – | 3 | – | 1 |
| BYU | 2 | – | 2 | – | 2 | 5 | – | 2 | – | 2 |
| Utah State | 2 | – | 3 | – | 1 | 3 | – | 4 | – | 1 |
| Colorado A&M | 2 | – | 4 | – | 0 | 2 | – | 7 | – | 0 |
| Wyoming | 0 | – | 5 | – | 1 | 0 | – | 7 | – | 1 |
$ – Conference champion

The 1939 Utah Utes football team was an American football team that represented the University of Utah as a member of the Mountain States Conference (MSC) during the 1939 college football season. In their 15th season under head coach Ike Armstrong, the Utes compiled an overall record of 6–1–2 with a mark of 4–1–1 in conference play, placed second in the MSC, and outscored all opponents by a total of 261 to 74.

Four Utah players received recognition on the 1939 All-Mountain States football team: end Paul Bogden; tackle Luke Pappas; guard Rex Geary; and quarterback Bill Swan.

Utah was ranked at No. 40 (out of 609 teams) in the final Litkenhous Ratings for 1939.

== Schedule ==
| Date | Opponent | Site | Result | Attendance | Source |
|---|---|---|---|---|---|
| September 30 | Santa Clara* | Ute Stadium; Salt Lake City, UT | T 7–7 | 15,500–17,000 | |
| October 7 | Wyoming | Ute Stadium; Salt Lake City, UT | W 60–0 | | |
| October 14 | at BYU | BYU Stadium; Provo, UT (rivalry) | W 35–13 | 9,000–10,000 | |
| October 21 | vs. Idaho* | Public School Field; Boise, ID | W 35–0 | 6,500 | |
| October 28 | at Denver | DU Stadium; Denver, CO | T 7–7 | | |
| November 4 | Colorado^{†} | Ute Stadium; Salt Lake City, UT (rivalry) | L 14–21 | 13,000 | |
| November 11 | Hawaii* | Ute Stadium; Salt Lake City, UT | W 34–19 | 13,200 | |
| November 18 | at Colorado A&M | Colorado Field; Fort Collins, CO | W 42–7 | 5,000 | |
| November 23 | Utah State | Ute Stadium; Salt Lake City, UT (rivalry) | W 27–0 | 15,725 | |
*Non-conference game; ^{†}Homecoming

== NFL draft ==
Utah had three players selected in the 1940 NFL draft.

| Player | Position | Round | Pick | NFL team |
| Luke Pappas | Tackle | 9 | 71 | Chicago Cardinals |
| Tom Pace | Back | 10 | 87 | Chicago Bears |
| Pete Bogden | End | 14 | 125 | Cleveland Rams |

In addition, Halfback Fred Gehrke was not drafted but played eight seasons in the National Football League (NFL).
