= 1939 Arizona State Bulldogs football team =

American college football season

1939 Arizona State Bulldogs football

Border champion

Sun Bowl, T 0–0 vs. Catholic University
- Conference: Border Conference
- Record: 8–2–1 (4–0 Border)
- Head coach: Dixie Howell (2nd season)
- Captains: Wiley Aker; Noble Riggs
- Home stadium: Goodwin Stadium

1939 Border Conference football standings
	Conf.					Overall
Team	W		L		T	W		L		T
Arizona State $	4	–	0	–	0	8	–	2	–	1
New Mexico	4	–	2	–	0	8	–	2	–	0
Texas Tech	2	–	1	–	0	5	–	5	–	1
Texas Mines	3	–	2	–	0	5	–	4	–	0
Arizona	1	–	2	–	0	6	–	4	–	0
New Mexico A&M	1	–	4	–	0	3	–	6	–	0
Arizona State–Flagstaff	0	–	4	–	0	1	–	6	–	1
$ – Conference champion

The 1939 Arizona State Bulldogs football team was an American football team that represented Arizona State Teachers College (later renamed Arizona State University) in the Border Conference during the 1939 college football season. In their second season under head coach Dixie Howell, the Bulldogs compiled an 8–2–1 record (4–0 against Border opponents), won the conference championship, played to a scoreless tie against Catholic University in the 1940 Sun Bowl, and outscored their opponents by a combined total of 212 to 56. The team captains were Wiley Aker and Noble Riggs. The Bulldogs finished 6–0 at home, 2–2 on the road, and 0–0–1 on a neutral site. Hilman Walker was an assistant coach.

Arizona State was ranked at No. 65 (out of 609 teams) in the final Litkenhous Ratings for 1939.

All home games were played at Goodwin Stadium in Tempe, Arizona.

== Schedule ==
Date	Opponent	Site	Result	Attendance	Source
September 21	at San Diego State*	Aztec Bowl; San Diego, CA	W 20–0	3,500	
September 30	West Texas State*	Goodwin Stadium; Tempe, AZ	W 19–0	5,000	
October 7	Cal Poly*	Goodwin Stadium; Tempe, AZ	W 35–0		
October 14	Whittier*	Goodwin Stadium; Tempe, AZ	W 28–0		
October 20	at New Mexico A&M	Quesenberry Field; Las Cruces, NM	W 7–0		
October 28	Texas Mines	Goodwin Stadium; Tempe, AZ	W 27–7		
November 4	vs. Hardin–Simmons*	Fly Field; Odessa, TX	L 7–19		
November 11	Arizona State–Flagstaff	Goodwin Stadium; Tempe, AZ	W 41–6		
November 18	New Mexico	Goodwin Stadium; Tempe, AZ	W 28–6	10,000	
November 23	at San Diego Marines*	Balboa Stadium; San Diego, CA	L 0–18	6,000	
January 1, 1940	vs. Catholic University*	Kidd Field; El Paso, TX (Sun Bowl)	T 0–0	12,000–13,000	
*Non-conference game

== Game summaries ==
=== Regular season ===
In the season opener, Arizona State delivered a 20–0 road shutout victory over San Diego State. The Bulldogs produced another shutout in their home opener, as they beat West Texas State 19–0 in Tempe. Arizona State shut out Cal Poly 35–0 at Goodwin Stadium, as halfback Hascall Henshaw scored a touchdown on a 91-yard kickoff return. The Bulldogs prevailed for a 28–0 home win against Whittier. Arizona State earned a 7–0 road win at New Mexico State, marking their fifth consecutive shutout victory to begin the season. The Bulldogs outlasted Texas-El Paso, 27–7, in Tempe. Arizona State's six-game winning streak was snapped in a 19–7 road loss at Hardin-Simmons. The Bulldogs responded with a convincing 41–6 home victory over NAU. Arizona State delivered a 28–6 win against New Mexico at Goodwin Stadium. In the regular season finale, the Bulldogs suffered an 18–0 road loss to the San Diego Marines.

=== 1940 Sun Bowl ===
On January 1, 1940, Arizona State played to a 0–0 tie against Catholic University in the 1940 Sun Bowl. The game was played at Kidd Field in El Paso, Texas with a crowd of 13,000 persons in attendance. It marked the only meeting between the teams in school history. The Bulldogs held Catholic University to only four first downs, but Arizona State lost four fumbles and threw several interceptions. Fullback Wayne Pitts had 15 carries for 89 rushing yards for Arizona State. It was the first bowl game in Arizona State school history.

== Roster ==
The usual Arizona State lineup included left end Bob Lackey, left tackle Mark Kalastro, left guard Albert Sanserino, center Bob Walberg, right guard Louis Rappaport, right tackle Ted Anderson, right end Sam Andrews, quarterback Walt Ruth, halfbacks Wiley Aker and Hascall Henshaw, and fullback Bill Davis.

Ted Anderson, John Balshor, Leo Burns, Dominic Campolo, and Frank Consentino were also on roster.

== Awards and honors ==
Halfback Joe Hernandez, fullback Wayne Pitts, and guards Noble Riggs and Albert Sanserino each earned All-Border Conference honors for the 1939 football season.

Fullback Wayne Pitts earned Little All-America second-team honors.
