= 1939 Texas A&M Aggies football team =

American college football season

1939 Texas A&M Aggies football

AP Poll national champion SWC champion Sugar Bowl champion

Sugar Bowl, W 14–13 vs. Tulane
- Conference: Southwest Conference

Ranking
- AP: No. 1
- Record: 11–0 (6–0 SWC)
- Head coach: Homer Norton (6th season)
- Home stadium: Kyle Field

1939 Southwest Conference football standings
	Conf.					Overall
Team	W		L		T	W		L		T
No. 1 Texas A&M $	6	–	0	–	0	11	–	0	–	0
Baylor	4	–	2	–	0	7	–	3	–	0
SMU	4	–	2	–	0	6	–	3	–	1
Texas	3	–	3	–	0	5	–	4	–	0
Arkansas	2	–	3	–	1	4	–	5	–	1
TCU	1	–	5	–	0	3	–	7	–	0
Rice	0	–	5	–	1	1	–	9	–	1
$ – Conference champion; Rankings from AP Poll

The 1939 Texas A&M Aggies football team represented the Agricultural and Mechanical College of Texas—now known as Texas A&M University—as a member of the Southwest Conference (SWC) during the 1939 college football season. In their sixth year under head coach Homer Norton, the Aggies compiled a perfect 11-0 record for their first (and to date, only) consensus national championship, shut out six of eleven opponents, won the Southwest Conference championship, and outscored all opponents by a total of 212 to 31.

In the final AP Poll released on December 12, the Aggies were ranked No 1 with 1,091 points, edging out Tennessee (970 points), USC (891 points), and Cornell (889 points). They went on to defeat No. 5 Tulane, 14–13, in the 1940 Sugar Bowl.

Fullback John Kimbrough was a consensus pick on the 1939 All-America college football team. Kimbrough was inducted in 1954 into the College Football Hall of Fame.

Tackle Joe Boyd was the team captain. He was also chosen as a first-team All-American by, among others, Grantland Rice for Collier's Weekly and the Sporting News.

Four Texas A&M players were selected by the United Press as first-team players on the 1939 All-Southwest Conference football team: Kimbrough; Boyd; end Herbert Smith; and guard Marshall Robnett.

== Schedule ==
Date	Opponent	Rank	Site	Result	Attendance	Source
September 23	at Oklahoma A&M*		Lewis Field; Stillwater OK	W 32–0	6,000	
September 30	Centenary*		Kyle Field; College Station, TX	W 14–0	10,000	
October 6	at Santa Clara*		Seals Stadium; San Francisco, CA	W 7–3	16,000	
October 14	vs. Villanova*		Tyler High School; Tyler, TX (Rose Festival Classic)	W 33–7	14,000	
October 21	at TCU	No. 9	T.C.U. Stadium; Fort Worth, TX (rivalry)	W 20–6	25,000	
October 28	Baylor	No. 5	Kyle Field; College Station, TX (Battle of the Brazos)	W 20–0	20,000	
November 4	at Arkansas	No. 5	Bailey Stadium; Fayetteville, AR (rivalry)	W 27–0	11,000	
November 11	No. 13 SMU	No. 2	Kyle Field; College Station, TX	W 6–2	30,000	
November 18	at Rice	No. 2	Rice Field; Houston, TX	W 19–0	25,000	
November 30	Texas	No. 1	Kyle Field; College Station, TX (rivalry)	W 20–0	40,000	
January 1	vs. No. 5 Tulane*	No. 1	Tulane Stadium; New Orleans, LA (Sugar Bowl)	W 14–13	73,000	
*Non-conference game; Rankings from AP Poll released prior to the game

== Rankings ==
Ranking movements Legend: ██ Increase in ranking ██ Decrease in ranking т = Tied with team above or below ( ) = First-place votes
	Week								
Poll	1	2	3	4	5	6	7	8	Final
AP	9 (5)	5 (6)	5 (6)	2 (6)	2	1 (38)	1т (27)	1 (28)	1 (55)

== Starting lineup ==
Name	Number	Position
Sterling, James	67	REL
Boyd, Joe	64	RTL
Henke, Charles	38	RGL
Vaughn, Tommie	60	C
Robnett, Marshal Foch "Foxey"	43	LGR
Pannell, Ernest	54	LTR
Smith, Herbert	29	LER
Moser, Derace "Mose"	42	LHR
Thomason, James	47	RHL
Price, Walemon	45	Q
Kimbrough, John "Jarrin"	39	F
