= 1939 BYU Cougars football team =

American college football season

1939 BYU Cougars football
- Conference: Mountain States Conference
- Record: 5–2–2 (2–2–2 MSC)
- Head coach: Eddie Kimball (3rd season)
- Home stadium: BYU Stadium

1939 Mountain States Conference football standings
	Conf.					Overall
Team	W		L		T	W		L		T
Colorado $	5	–	1	–	0	5	–	3	–	0
Utah	4	–	1	–	1	6	–	1	–	2
Denver	3	–	2	–	1	5	–	3	–	1
BYU	2	–	2	–	2	5	–	2	–	2
Utah State	2	–	3	–	1	3	–	4	–	1
Colorado A&M	2	–	4	–	0	2	–	7	–	0
Wyoming	0	–	5	–	1	0	–	7	–	1
$ – Conference champion

The 1939 BYU Cougars football team was an American football team that represented Brigham Young University (BYU) as a member of the Mountain States Conference (MSC) during the 1939 college football season. their third season under head coach Eddie Kimball, the Cougars compiled am overall record of 5–2–2 with a mark of 2–2–2 against conference opponents, finished fourth in the MSC, and outscored opponents by a total of 110 to 90.

Sophomore left halfback George Wing led the team on offense.

BYU was ranked at No. 161 (out of 609 teams) in the final Litkenhous Ratings for 1939.

== Schedule ==
Date	Opponent	Site	Result	Attendance	Source
September 23	at Arizona State–Flagstaff*	Flagstaff, AZ	W 25–0		
October 7	Colorado A&M	BYU Stadium; Provo, UT	W 13–12	3,000	
October 14	Utah	BYU Stadium; Provo, UT (rivalry)	L 13–35	9,000–10,000	
October 21	at Nevada*	Mackay Field; Reno, NV	W 7–0	5,000	
October 27	at Colorado State–Greeley*	Greeley, CO	W 18–6		
November 4	at Denver	DU Stadium; Denver, CO	W 21–18		
November 11	at Utah State	Aggie Stadium; Logan, UT (rivalry)	T 0–0	9,000	
November 18	Colorado^{†}	BYU Stadium; Provo, UT	L 6–12	7,500	
November 25	at Wyoming	Corbett Field; Laramie, WY	T 7–7	1,500	
*Non-conference game; ^{†}Homecoming
