= 1939 Texas Tech vs. Centenary football game =

1939 Texas Tech vs. Centenary "When Punts Rained from the Sky"
Texas Tech Red Raiders	Centenary Gentlemen
(3–4)	(0–8)
0	0
Head coach: Pete Cawthon	Head coach: Curtis Parker
	1	2	3	4	Total
Texas Tech	0	0	0	0	0
Centenary	0	0	0	0	0
- Date: November 11, 1939
- Season: 1939
- Stadium: Centenary College Stadium
- Location: Shreveport, Louisiana

The 1939 Texas Tech vs. Centenary football game was an American college football game played between the Texas Tech Red Raiders and Centenary Gentlemen on November 11, 1939, at Centenary College Stadium in Shreveport, Louisiana. In "one of the weirdest games in NCAA History," torrential downpour and muddy field conditions prevented either Texas Tech or Centenary from advancing the ball by running or passing. To cope with the conditions, both teams resorted to repetitive and immediate punting. Both teams combined to punt 77 times. With each punt, both teams hoped to recover a fumble at the other end of the field.

6 of 14 fumbles were lost, but none of the turnovers led to a score. 42 punts were returned, 19 went out of bounds, 10 were downed, 1 went into the end zone for a touchback, 4 were blocked, and 1 was fair caught. 67 punts (34 by Texas Tech, 33 by Centenary) occurred on first down, including 22 consecutively in the third and fourth quarters. The game ended in a 0–0 tie with Centenary owning a statistical edge with 31 yards of total offense compared with a one-yard loss for Texas Tech.

== Historical significance ==
The 1939 Texas Tech vs Centenary game is referenced in the 2013 edition of the NCAA Football Records Book 14 times. More NCAA single-game records (13 total) were set in the 1939 Texas Tech vs Centenary game than any other game played in NCAA history. Steve Boda, a former associate director of NCAA statistics, researched the record in 1987. Stunned by the brief wire-service report of the game, he used a play-by-play account to confirm the details. All NCAA records set during the game have remained unbroken. Boda claims three modern football factors guard against a repeat of these records: Better field surfaces, easier to handle footballs, and advanced gloves and footwear.

=== NCAA records ===
==== Individual records ====
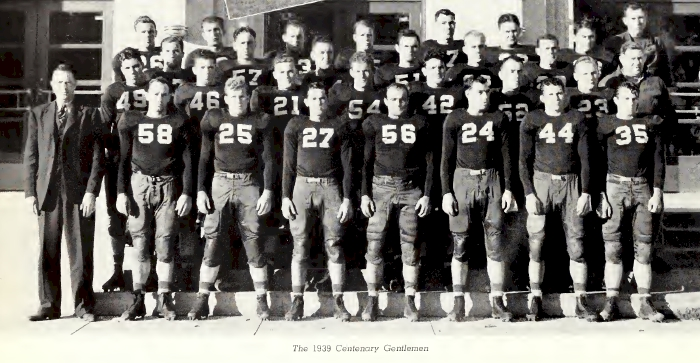
1939 Centenary College Gents Football Team

Player	Position	Team	NCAA record	Statistic
Charlie Calhoun	Punter	Texas Tech	Most punts, game	36 (vs Centenary 1939)
Charlie Calhoun	Punter	Texas Tech	Most punting yards, game	1,318 (vs Centenary 1939)
Milton Hill	Punt Returner	Texas Tech	Most punt returns, game	20 (vs Centenary 1939)
Milton Hill	Punt Returner	Texas Tech	Most combined punt and kickoff returns, game	20 (vs Centenary 1939)

==== Team records ====
NCAA record	Team	Statistic
Most punts, both teams	Texas Tech & Centenary (LA)	77
Most punts, game	Texas Tech	Texas Tech - 39 (1st), Centenary - 38 (2nd)
Most punt returns, game	Texas Tech	22
Most punt returns, both teams	Texas Tech & Centenary (LA)	42
Fewest Plays	Texas Tech	12
Fewest Plays Allowed	Centenary (LA)	12
Fewest Plays, both Teams	Texas Tech & Centenary (LA)	33
Fewest yards gained, both Teams	Texas Tech & Centenary (LA)	30
Fewest rushes, both Teams	Texas Tech & Centenary (LA)	28

NCAA Records Reference (Last referenced for 2013 season)
