= Park Myers =

American football player (1916–2001)

- Park Myers, 1939

Profile
- Position: Tackle

Personal information
- Born: January 20, 1916; Kansas, U.S.
- Died: February 10, 2001 (aged 85); Austin, Texas, U.S.

Career information
- College: Texas

Awards and highlights
- Second-team All-SWC (1939)

Park Leslie Myers (January 20, 1916 – February 10, 2001) was an American football player.

A Kansas native, Myers attended high school in Caldwell, Kansas. He played four years of high school football, playing fullback on offense and tackle on defense. After high school, he played two years of junior college football at Schreiner Institute, earning all-state junior college honors. He was elected as president of the Schreiner student body in 1935.

He then transferred to the University of Texas where he played at the tackle position for the Texas Longhorns, earning varsity letters in 1937, 1938, and 1939. He was co-captain of the 1939 Texas team. He was also selected to play in the 1940 East-West Shrine Game after his senior year.

Myers was selected by the Cleveland Rams in the fifth round (35th overall pick) of the 1940 NFL draft, but he opted instead to work for the Hughes Tool Company. During World War II, he served in the Fourteenth Air Force in China. He was married in June 1940 to Julie Antoinette Jackson. After the war, Myers returned to work at the Hughes Tool Company, eventually becoming the company's sales manager. He died in 2001 at age 85.
