= Municipal Stadium (Waco) =

Athletics stadium in Waco, Texas, United States

Municipal Stadium (Kiwanis Field)
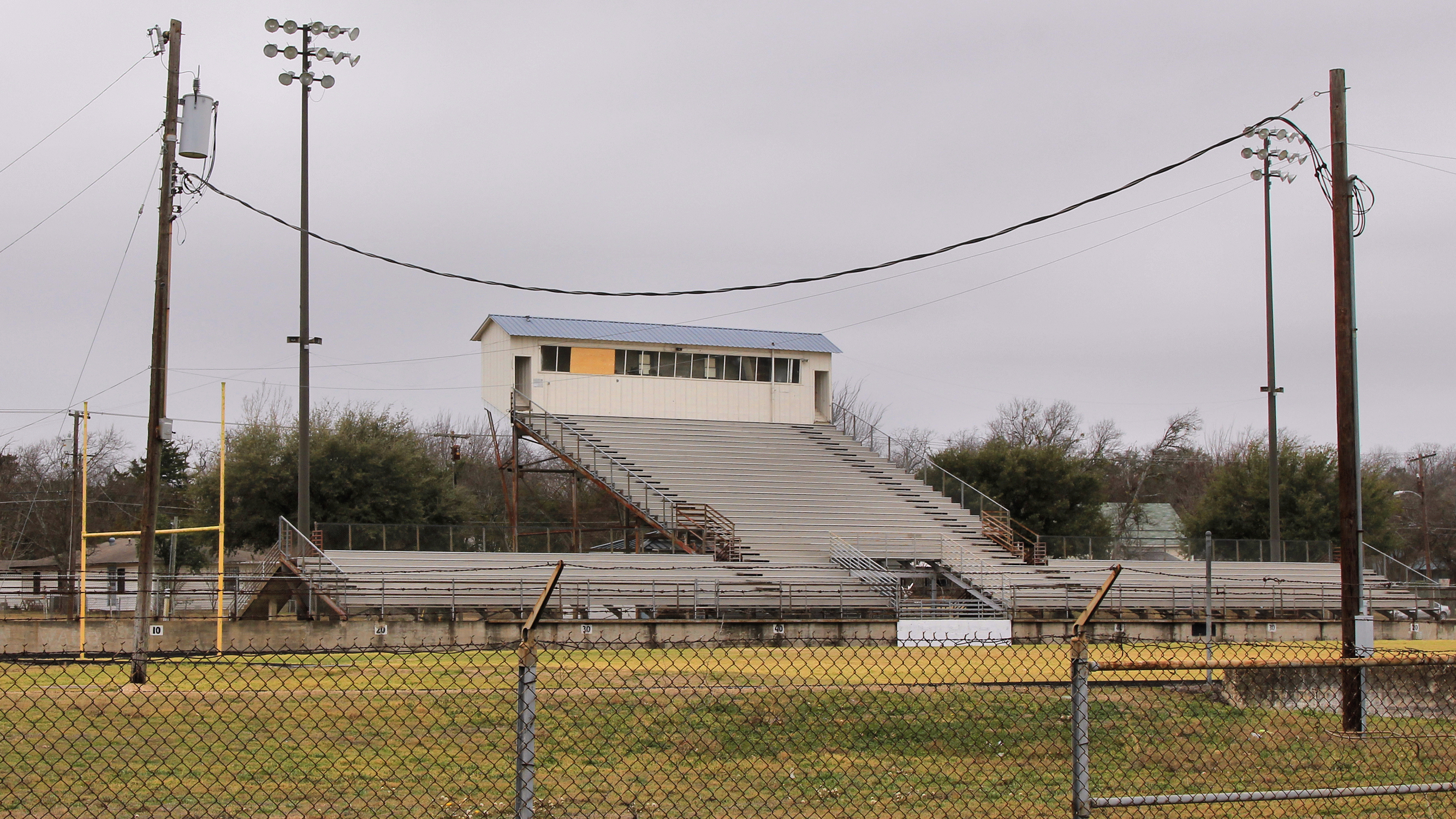
- Interactive map of Municipal Stadium (Kiwanis Field)
- Former names: Waco Stadium (1936–1942)
- Location: Waco, Texas
- Coordinates: 31.542110°N 97.131781°W
- Surface: Grass

Construction
- Built: 1936
- Opened: 1936

Tenant
- Baylor Bears (NCAA SWC) (1936–1949)

Municipal Stadium, or Waco Municipal Stadium, and formerly Waco Stadium, is an athletics stadium located in Waco, Texas at S 15th Street and Dutton Avenue. It was the home field of Baylor University's athletic teams from the time shortly after the stadium was built in 1936 until 1949. For the Bears, the new off-campus facility replaced the smaller Carroll Field as the home football game location, where they had played from 1930 to 1935. Waco Stadium was renamed Municipal Stadium in 1942. Baylor did not play there in 1943 or 1944 due to World War II. Baylor's track teams used the stadium into the 1950s.

Today the original grandstands are gone, replaced by a single side seating area, but the track and playing field remain.
