= 1940 San Diego Marines Devil Dogs football team =

American college football season

1940 San Diego Marines Devil Dogs football
- Conference: Independent
- Record: 8–1
- Head coach: Elmer Hall (2nd season)

1940 Western college football independents records
	Conf.			Overall
Team	W	L	T	W		L		T
No. 11 Santa Clara		–		6	–	1	–	1
Cal Poly		–		6	–	3	–	0
Saint Mary's		–		5	–	3	–	0
Gonzaga		–		5	–	4	–	1
Nevada		–		4	–	4	–	1
Humboldt State		–		3	–	4	–	0
Idaho Southern Branch		–		3	–	5	–	0
San Francisco State		–		3	–	5	–	0
Loyola (CA)		–		3	–	7	–	0
Portland		–		2	–	3	–	1
Hawaii		–		2	–	5	–	0
San Francisco		–		1	–	6	–	1
La Verne		–		0	–	6	–	0
Rankings from AP Poll

The 1940 San Diego Marine Devil Dogs football team was an American football team that represented the United States Marines Corps Recruit Depot in San Diego as an independent during the 1940 college football season. Playing against college football teams from California, Oregon, and Montana, the Devil Dogs compiled an 8–1 record, shut out four of nine opponents, and outscored all opponents by a total of 185 to 47. The team's only loss was to Oregon. Lieutenant Colonel Elmer Hall, who had previously played college football for Oregon, returned for a second year as the Devil Dogs' head football coach.

At the end of the season, the San Diego Marines were ranked at No. 84 (out of 697 teams) in the final Litkenhous Difference by Score rankings for 1940.

== Schedule ==
Date	Opponent	Site	Result	Attendance	Source
September 27	at Oregon	Hayward Field; Eugene, OR	L 2–12	4,500	
October 5	Redlands	San Diego, CA	W 13–0		
October 12	Pomona	San Diego, CA	W 47–0	6,000	
October 18	at Willamette	Sweetland Field; Salem, OR	W 7–6	3,500	
November 2	Santa Barbara State	Balboa Stadium; San Diego, CA	W 19–0		
November 8	San Diego State	Balboa Stadium; San Diego, CA	W 20–6	12,000	
November 15	Montana	San Diego, CA	W 38–20		
November 22	Whittier	San Diego, CA	W 33–0		
December 5	Pacific (CA)	San Diego, CA	W 6–3	12,000	
