= 1939 Southern California Conference football season =

- Sport: Football
- Teams: 5
- Champion: Whittier

Football seasons
- 1938 1940

1939 Southern California Conference football standings
	Conf.					Overall
Team	W		L		T	W		L		T
Whittier $	3	–	0	–	1	8	–	2	–	1
Pomona	2	–	1	–	1	4	–	3	–	1
Occidental	2	–	2	–	0	3	–	5	–	0
Redlands	2	–	2	–	0	3	–	7	–	0
Caltech	0	–	4	–	0	2	–	6	–	0
$ – Conference champion

The 1939 Southern California Conference football season was the season of college football played by the five member schools of the Southern California Conference (SCC) as part of the 1939 college football season.

The Whittier Poets, led by head coach Wallace Newman, won the SCC championship with an 8–2–1 record (3–0–1 against SCC opponents) and outscored opponents by a total of 214 to 97. Halfback Gene Wineinger and tackle Myron Claxton were unanimous picks as first-team players on the 1939 SCC all-star team. The 1939 Occidental–Whittier football rivalry game gave birth to Myron Claxton's Shoes, a traveling trophy that has been awarded to the winner of the game since 1945.

The Pomona Sagehens, led by head coach Earl J. Merritt, finished in second place with a 4–3–1 record. Tackle Stan Jolivette and halfback Normal Nagel were first-team picks on the SCC all-star team.

== Conference overview ==
Conf. rank	Team	Head coach	Conf. record	Overall record	Points scored	Points against
1	Whittier	Wallace Newman	3–0–1	8–2–1	214	97
2	Pomona	Earl J. Merritt	2–1–1	4–3–1	89	98
3	Occidental	Bill Anderson	2–2	3–5	82	138
4	Redlands	Cecil A. Cushman	2–2	3–7		
5	Caltech	Fox Stanton	0–4	2–6	89	98

== Teams ==
=== Whittier ===
1939 Whittier Poets football

SCC champion
- Conference: Southern California Conference
- Record: 8–2–1 (3–0–1 SCC)
- Head coach: Wallace Newman (11th season)
- Home stadium: Hadley Field

The 1939 Whittier Poets football team represented Whittier College of Whittier, California. In their 11th season under head coach Wallace Newman, the team compiled an 8–2–1 record (3–0–1 against SCC opponents) and won the SCC championship.

Whittier players received six of eleven first-team spots on the 1939 SCC all-star team selected by the conference coaches. Whittier players receiving first-team honors were: halfback Gene Wineinger; ends Leroy Hughes and Don Craggs; tackle Myron Claxton; guard Bert Nichols; and center Alex Mecikoff.

Prior to the Occidental–Whittier football rivalry game on November 11, 1939, Occidental stole Myron Claxton's Shoes in an attempt to hinder his performance. Claxton reportedly played in work boots, leading Whittier to a 36–0 victory. Following the game, Claxton reclaimed his shoes from the Occidental sideline. Claxton's shoes were later bronzed and became a traveling trophy held each year by the winner of the rivalry game. The shoes were featured on a 2013 episode of ESPN's College Gameday.

Date	Opponent	Site	Result	Attendance	Source
September 20	USS Maryland*	Hadley Field; Whittier, CA	W 12–0	4,000	
September 27	at Loyola (Los Angeles)*	Gilmore Stadium; Los Angeles	W 19–13	9,000	
October 7	at Pomona	Alumni Field; Claremont, CA	T 0–0	4,000	
October 14	at Arizona State*	Goodwin Stadium; Tempe, AZ	L 0–19	9,000	
October 21	at Arizona State–Flagstaff*	Skidmore Field; Flagstaff, AZ	W 27–13	1,000	
October 27	Caltech	Hadley Field; Whittier, CA	W 47–6	3,000	
November 4	at San Diego State*	Aztec Bowl; San Diego, CA (Shrine Charity game)	W 23–12	8,000	
November 11	Occidental^{†}	Hadley Field; Whittier, CA	W 36–0	7,000	
November 17	Fresno State*	Hadley Field; Whittier, CA	L 13–27	5,000	
November 22	at Redlands	Redlands, CA	W 27–7	> 3,000	
December 1	Santa Barbara State*	Hadley Field; Whittier, CA	W 10–0	4,000	
*Non-conference game; ^{†}Homecoming

=== Pomona ===
1939 Pomona Sagehens football
- Conference: Southern California Conference
- Record: 4–3–1 (2–1–1 SCC)
- Head coach: Earl J. Merritt (5th season)

The 1939 Pomona Sagehens football team represented Pomona College of Pomona, California. In their fifth season under head coach Earl J. Merritt, the Sagehens compiled a 4–3–1 record (2–1–1 against SCC opponents) and finished in second place in the SCC.

Two Pomona players received first-team honors on the 1939 SCC all-star team: halfback Norman Nagel and tackle Stan Jolivette.

Pomona was ranked at No. 247 (out of 609 teams) in the final Litkenhous Ratings for 1939.

Date	Opponent	Site	Result	Attendance	Source
September 23	at Arizona*	Arizona Stadium; Tucson, AZ	L 0–21		
October 7	Whittier	Alumni Field; Claremont, CA	T 0–0	4,000	
October 14	at Redlands	Redlands, CA	L 9–19		
October 21	La Verne*	Claremont, CA	W 16–0		
October 28	at San Diego State*	Aztec Bowl; San Diego, CA	W 12–6	4,500	
November 3	San Diego Marines*	Balboa Bowl; San Diego, CA	L 12–33		
November 11	at Caltech	Rose Bowl; Pasadena, CA	W 20–13		
November 18	Occidental^{†}	Claremont, CA	W 20–6	8,000	
*Non-conference game; ^{†}Homecoming

=== Occidental ===
1939 Occidental Tigers football
- Conference: Southern California Conference
- Record: 3–5 (2–2 SCC)
- Head coach: Bill Anderson (8th season)
- Home stadium: Patterson Field

The 1939 Occidental Tigers football team represented Occidental College of Los Angeles, California. In their eighth and final year under head coach Bill Anderson, the Tigers compiled a 3–5 record (2–2 against SCC opponents) and finished in third place in the SCC.

Two Occidental players received first-team honors on the 1939 SCC all-star team: fullback James Moradian and guard Jack Thatcher.

Occidental was ranked at No. 309 (out of 609 teams) in the final Litkenhous Ratings for 1939.

Date	Opponent	Site	Result	Attendance	Source
September 22	at Santa Barbara State*	State College Bowl; Santa Barbara, CA	L 0–20		
October 6	San Diego State*	Aztec Bowl; San Diego, CA	L 6–10	3,000	
October 21	at Caltech	Rose Bowl; Pasadena, CA	W 15–7		
October 27	at San Diego Marines*	San Diego, CA	L 6–33		
November 4	Redlands^{†}	Patterson Field; Los Angeles, CA	W 16–6	4,000	
November 11	at Whittier	Hadley Field; Whittier, CA	L 0–36	7,000	
November 18	at Pomona	Alumni Field; Claremont, CA	L 6–20	8,000	
December 2	Colorado College*	Patterson Field; Los Angeles, CA	W 33–6		
*Non-conference game; ^{†}Homecoming

=== Redlands ===
1939 Redlands Bulldogs football
- Conference: Southern California Conference
- Record: 3–7 (2–2 SCC)
- Head coach: Cecil A. Cushman (9th season)

The 1939 Redlands Bulldogs football team represented the University of Redlands of Redlands, California. In their 10th season under head coach Cecil A. Cushman, the Bulldogs compiled a 3–7 record (2–2 against SCC opponents) and finished in fourth place in the SCC.

Redlands was ranked at No. 324 (out of 609 teams) in the final Litkenhous Ratings for 1939.

Date	Opponent	Site	Result	Attendance	Source
September 22	at Loyola (Los Angeles)*	Gilmore Stadium; Los Angeles, CA	L 0–6	10,000	
September 29	at San Diego State*	Aztec Bowl; San Diego, CA	L 0–26	3,500	
October 6	at Santa Ana*	The Bowl; Santa Ana, CA	postponed		
October 14	Pomona	Redlands, CA	W 19–9		
October 21	at San Diego Marines*	Balboa Stadium; San Diego, CA	L 14–15	3,500	
October 27	La Verne*	Redlands, CA	W 13–12		
November 4	at Occidental	Patterson Field; Los Angeles, CA	L 6–15		
November 10	at San Jose State	Spartan Stadium; San Jose, CA	L 6–52		
November 18	at Caltech	Rose Bowl; Pasadena, CA	W 7–6		
November 22	Whittier	Redlands, CA	L 7–27	> 3,000	
*Non-conference game

=== Caltech ===
1939 Caltech Engineers football
- Conference: Southern California Conference
- Record: 2–6 (0–4 SCC)
- Head coach: Fox Stanton (19th season)
- Home stadium: Rose Bowl

The 1939 Caltech Engineers football team represented the California Institute of Technology of Pasadena, California. In their 19th year under head coach Fox Stanton, the Engineers compiled a 2–6 record (0–4 against SCC opponents) and finished in last place in the SCC.

Caltech's star center Paul H. Becker Jr. died from injuries sustained in a November 22 game against La Verne. He was 19 years old, attended Caltech on a mathematics scholarship, and died at Huntington Memorial Hospital having never regained consciousness.

Caltech quarterback Stanley Sohler received first-team honors on the 1939 SCC all-star team. End Donald Walter was named to the second team.

Date	Opponent	Site	Result	Attendance	Source
September 22	at Cal Poly*	Mustang Stadium; San Luis Obispo, CA	L 6–24	2,000	
September 29	Citrus*	Tournament Park; Pasadena, CA	W 26–0		
October 6	at San Diego Marines*	San Diego, CA	L 3–21		
October 21	Occidental	Rose Bowl; Pasadena, CA	L 7–15		
October 27	at Whittier	Hadley Field; Whittier, CA	L 6–47	3,000	
November 11	Pomona	Rose Bowl; Pasadena, CA	L 12–20		
November 18	Redlands	Rose Bowl; Pasadena, CA	L 6–7		
November 23	La Verne*	Rose Bowl; Pasadena, CA	W 13–7		
*Non-conference game

== All-conference team ==
At the end of the season, the SCC coaches selected the following players as first-team players on the 1939 all-conference team:

- Quarterback: Stanley Sohler, Caltech
- Halfbacks: Norman Nagel, Pomona; Gene Wineinger, Whittier
- Fullback: James Moradian, Occidental
- Ends: Leroy Hughes, Whittier; Don Craggs, Whittier
- Tackles: Myron Claxton, Whittier; Stan Jolivette, Pomona
- Guards: Bert Nichols, Whittier; Jack Thatcher, Occidental
- Center: Alex Mechikoff, Whittier

Claxton and Wineinger were the only two unanimous choices.
