= 1939 Rocky Mountain Conference football season =

American college football season

Rocky Mountain Conference
- Sport: Football
- Teams: 5
- Champion: Colorado Mines

Football seasons
- 1938 1940

1939 Rocky Mountain Conference football standings
	Conf.					Overall
Team	W		L		T	W		L		T
Colorado Mines $	4	–	0	–	0	8	–	0	–	0
Colorado State–Greeley	3	–	1	–	0	4	–	4	–	0
Western State (CO)	1	–	2	–	0	2	–	5	–	1
Montana State	0	–	2	–	0	2	–	7	–	0
Colorado College	0	–	3	–	0	2	–	5	–	1
$ – Conference champion

The 1939 Rocky Mountain Conference football season was the season of college football played by the five member schools of the Rocky Mountain Conference (RMC) as part of the 1939 college football season.

The Colorado Mines Orediggers, led by head coach John Mason, compiled a perfect 8–0 record and won the RMC championship. They led the RMC in both scoring offense (33.5 points per game) and scoring defense (8.8 points per game). Colorado Mines wingback Lloyd Madden led the nation with 143 points scored.

== Conference overview ==
Conf. rank	Team	Head coach	Conf. record	Overall record	Points scored	Points against
1	Colorado Mines	John Mason	4–0	8–0	268	44
2	Colorado State–Greeley	John W. Hancock	3–1	4–4	79	70
3	Western State (CO)	Paul Wright	2–5–1	1–2	42	174
4	Montana State	Schubert R. Dyche	0–2	2–7	54	120
5	Colorado College	William T. Van de Graaff	0–3	2–5–1	99	164

== Teams ==
=== Colorado Mines ===
1939 Colorado Mines Orediggers football

RMC champion
- Conference: Rocky Mountain Conference
- Record: 8–0 (4–0 RMC)
- Head coach: John Mason (3rd season)
- Home stadium: Brooks Field

The 1939 Colorado Mines Orediggers football team represented the Colorado School of Mines of Golden, Colorado. In their third year under head coach John Mason, the Orediggers compiled a perfect 8–0 record, outscored opponents by a total of 268 to 44, and won the RMC championship.

Colorado Mines was ranked at No. 93 (out of 609 teams) in the final Litkenhous Ratings for 1939.

Colorado Mines wingback Lloyd Madden won the national scoring title with 141 points scored (23 touchdowns and three extra points). He broke the RMC scoring record set in 1937 by Byron White. He was selected by the Chicago Cardinals with the 16th overall pick in the 1940 NFL draft.

Colorado Mines secured eight of eleven first-team spots on the Associated Press All-Rocky Mountain Conference football team. Six were also given first-team conference honors by the United Press. The first-team honorees were: backs Madden (AP-1, UP-1), Joe Berta (AP-1), Jacky Torpey (AP-1, UP-1), and Taylor (UP-1); end Rex Flynn (AP-1, UP-1); tackles Marv Katzenstein (AP-1, UP-1) and Dick Moe (AP-1, UP-1); guard Dave Geiskieng (AP-1, UP-1); and center Herbert Thornton (AP-1).

Date	Opponent	Site	Result	Attendance	Source
September 30	at Colorado A&M	Colorado Field; Fort Collins, CO	W 19–14		
October 7	Chadron State	Brooks Field; Golden, CO	W 32–0		
October 14	at Colorado State–Greeley	Jackson Field; Greeley, CO	W 6–3	5,000	
October 21	at Montana State	Gatton Field; Bozeman, MT	W 20–7	2,000	
October 28	Colorado College	Brooks Field; Golden, CO	W 50–7		
November 11	Western State (CO)	Brooks Field; Golden, CO	W 71–7		
November 18	Kearney State	Brooks Field; Golden, CO	W 32–0		
December 2	at Regis	Denver, CO	W 38–6		

=== Colorado State–Greeley ===
1939 Colorado State–Greeley Bears football
- Conference: Rocky Mountain Conference
- Record: 4–4 (3–1 RMC)
- Head coach: John W. Hancock (8th season)
- Home stadium: Jackson Field

The 1939 Colorado State–Greeley Bears football team represented Colorado State College at Greeley, Colorado (now known as the University of Northern Colorado). In their eighth year under head coach John W. Hancock, the Bears compiled a 4–4 record (3–1 against RMC opponents) and finished in second place out of five teams in the RMC.

Colorado State–Greeley was ranked at No. 225 (out of 609 teams) in the final Litkenhous Ratings for 1939.

The team played its home games at Jackson Field in Greeley, Colorado.

Date	Opponent	Site	Result	Attendance	Source
September 30	at Southern Idaho	Pocatello, ID	W 13–0		
October 6	Colorado College	Jackson Field; Greeley, CO	W 26–9	3,000	
October 14	Colorado Mines	Jackson Field; Greeley, CO	L 3–6	5,000	
October 21	at Western State (CO)	Gunnison, CO	W 13–0		
October 27	BYU	Jackson Field; Greeley, CO	L 6–18		
November 3	Montana State	Jackson Field; Greeley, CO	W 12–3	1,500	
November 11	at Nevada*	Mackay Field; Reno, NV	L 6–15		
November 17	at Santa Barbara State*	La Playa Stadium; Santa Barbara, CA	L 0–19		
*Non-conference game

=== Western State ===
1939 Western State Mountaineers football
- Conference: Rocky Mountain Conference
- Record: 2–5–1 (1–2 RMC)
- Head coach: Paul Wright (5th season)

The 1939 Western State Mountaineers football team represented Western State College of Colorado at Gunnison, Colorado (now known as the Western Colorado University). In their fifth year under head coach Paul Wright, the Mountaineers compiled a 2–5–1 record (1–2 against RMC opponents) and finished in third place out of five teams in the RMC.

Date	Time	Opponent	Site	Result	Attendance	Source
September 29		Weber*	Ogden, UT	W 9–7	600	
October 6	7:00 p.m.	at West Texas State*	Buffalo Stadium; Canyon, TX	L 0–35		
October 13		Chadron State*	Chadron, NE	T 0–0		
October 21		Colorado State–Greeley	Gunnison, CO	L 0–13		
October 28		Regis*	Gunnison, CO	L 0–9		
November 11		at Colorado Mines	Brooks Field; Golden, CO	L 7–71		
November 25		at Colorado College	Washburn Field; Colorado Springs, CO	W 12–8		
November 30		at New Mexico Military	Roswell, NM	L 14–31		
*Non-conference game; All times are in Mountain time

=== Montana State ===
1939 Montana State Bobcats football
- Conference: Rocky Mountain Conference
- Record: 2–7 (0–2 RMC)
- Head coach: Schubert R. Dyche (10th season)
- Home stadium: Gatton Field

The 1939 Montana State Bobcats football team represented Montana State College (later renamed Montana State University) of Bozeman, Montana. In their tenth season under head coach Schubert R. Dyche, the Bobcats compiled a 2–7 record (0–2 against conference opponents) and finished in fourth place out of five teams in the RMC.

Montana State was ranked at No. 252 (out of 609 teams) in the final Litkenhous Ratings for 1939.

Date	Opponent	Site	Result	Attendance	Source
September 15	at San Jose State*	Spartan Stadium; San Jose, CA	L 0–35	5,000	
September 22	at Portland*	Multnomah Stadium; Portland, OR	W 14–6		
September 30	at Idaho*	Neale Stadium; Moscow, ID	L 6–7		
October 6	at Omaha*	Omaha, NE	L 0–12		
October 14	vs. Montana*	Butte High Stadium; Butte, MT (rivalry)	L 0–6		
October 20	Colorado Mines	Gatton Field; Bozeman, MT	L 7–20		
October 28	Idaho Southern Branch*	Gatton Field; Bozeman, MT	W 10–6		
November 3	at Colorado State–Greeley	Jackson Field; Greeley, CO	L 3–12	1,500	
November 11	North Dakota Agricultural*	Gatton Field; Bozeman, MT	L 14–16		
*Non-conference game

=== Colorado College ===
1939 Colorado College Tigers football
- Conference: Rocky Mountain Conference
- Record: 2–5–1 (0–4 RMC)
- Head coach: William T. Van de Graaff (14th season)
- Home stadium: Washburn Field

The 1939 Colorado College Tigers football team represented Colorado College of Colorado Springs, Colorado. In their 14th and final season under head coach William T. Van de Graaff, the Tigers compiled a 2–5–1 record (0–4 against RMC opponents) and finished in last place out of five teams in the RMC. The team played its home games at Washburn Field in Colorado Springs.

Date	Opponent	Site	Result	Attendance	Source
September 30	Baker	Washburn Field; Colorado Spring, CO	W 30–0		
October 6	at Colorado State–Greeley	Jackson Field; Greeley, CO	L 9–26	3,000	
October 13	at Washburn*	Topeka, KS	L 6–22		
October 21	Grinnell*	Washburn Field; Colorado Springs, CO	T 14–14	5,000	
October 28	at Colorado Mines	Brooks Field; Golden, CO	L 7–50		
November 11	Whitman*	Washburn Field; Colorado Springs, CO	W 19–7		
November 25	Western State (CO)	Washburn Field; Colorado Springs, CO	L 8–12		
December 2	at Occidental*	Los Angeles, CA	L 6–33		
*Non-conference game

== All-conference team ==
The Associated Press selected the following players as first-team honorees on the all-conference team.
