= 1940 Pacific Tigers football team =

American college football season

1940 Pacific Tigers football

FWC champion
- Conference: Far Western Conference
- Record: 4–5 (2–0 FWC)
- Head coach: Amos Alonzo Stagg (8th season)
- Home stadium: Baxter Stadium

1940 Far Western Conference football standings
	Conf.					Overall
Team	W		L		T	W		L		T
Pacific (CA) $	2	–	0	–	0	4	–	5	–	0
Cal Aggies	2	–	1	–	0	4	–	4	–	1
Chico State	1	–	2	–	0	3	–	3	–	1
Humboldt State	0	–	2	–	0	3	–	4	–	0
$ – Conference champion

The 1940 Pacific Tigers football team represented the College of the Pacific—now known as the University of the Pacific—in Stockton, California as a member of the Far Western Conference (FWC) during the 1940 college football season. Led by eighth-year head coach Amos Alonzo Stagg, Pacific compiled an overall record of 4–5 with a mark of 2–0 in conference play, winning the FWC title. The team was outscored by its opponents 94 to 81 for the season.

Pacific was ranked at No. 158 (out of 697 college football teams) in the final rankings under the Litkenhous Difference by Score system for 1940.

The Tigers played home games at Baxter Stadium in Stockton.

== Schedule ==
Date	Opponent	Site	Result	Attendance	Source
October 5	at Notre Dame*	Notre Dame Stadium; Notre Dame, IN	L 7–25	22,670	
October 11	California JV*	Baxter Stadium; Stockton, CA	W 6–0		
October 18	Fresno State*^{†}	Baxter Stadium; Stockton, CA	L 0–3	10,000	
October 25	at Loyola (CA)*	Gilmore Stadium; Los Angeles, CA	L 0–20	4,000	
November 2	at Cal Aggies	A Street field; Davis, CA	W 7–6		
November 8	at San Jose State*	Spartan Stadium; San Jose, CA (rivalry)	L 7–28	12,000	
November 21	Nevada*	Baxter Stadium; Stockton, CA	W 24–6		
November 29	at Chico State	College Field; Chico, CA	W 27–0		
December 5	at San Diego Marines*	San Diego, CA	L 3–6	12,000	
*Non-conference game; ^{†}Homecoming
