= 1945 Redlands Bulldogs football team =

American college football season

1945 Redlands Bulldogs football

SCC champion
- Conference: Southern California Conference
- Record: 5–0 (4–0 SCC)
- Head coach: Cecil A. Cushman (13th season)

The 1945 Redlands Bulldogs football team was an American football team that represented the University of Redlands as a member of the Southern California Conference (SCC) during the 1945 college football season. In their 13th year under head coach Cecil A. Cushman, the team compiled a 5–0 record (4–0 against SCC opponents), won the SCC championship, shut out three of five opponents, and outscored all opponents by a total of 150 to 13.

== Schedule ==
Date	Opponent	Site	Result	Attendance	Source
September 7	at Caltech	Rose Bowl; Pasadena, CA	W 13–7		
September 21	Occidental	Redlands, CA	W 44–0		
September 28	at San Diego State*	Balboa Stadium; San Diego, CA	W 7–6	12,000	
October 6	at Occidental	Patterson Field; Eagle Rock, Los Angeles, CA	W 39–0		
October 13	Pomona	Redlands, CA	W 47–0		
*Non-conference game
