= 1940 Southern California Conference football season =

- Sport: Football
- Teams: 5
- Champion: Redlands

Football seasons
- 1939 1941

1940 Southern California Conference football standings
	Conf.					Overall
Team	W		L		T	W		L		T
Redlands $	3	–	0	–	1	4	–	4	–	1
Pomona	3	–	1	–	0	4	–	4	–	0
Occidental	2	–	2	–	0	3	–	4	–	1
Whittier	1	–	2	–	1	2	–	6	–	1
Caltech	0	–	4	–	0	2	–	5	–	1
$ – Conference champion

The 1940 Southern California Conference football season was the season of college football played by the five member schools of the Southern California Conference (SCC) as part of the 1940 college football season.

The Redlands Bulldogs, led by head coach Cecil A. Cushman, won the SCC championship with a 4–4–1 record (3–0–1 against SCC opponents).

The Pomona Sagehens, led by head coach Earl J. Merritt, finished in second place with a 4–4 record (3–1 against SCC opponents).

== Conference overview ==
Conf. rank	Team	Head coach	Conf. record	Overall record	Points scored	Points against
1	Redlands	Cecil A. Cushman	3–0–1	4–4–1		
2	Pomona	Earl J. Merritt	3–1	4–4		
3	Occidental	Gus Henderson	2–2	3–4–1		
4	Whittier	Wallace Newman	1–2–1	2–6–1		
5	Caltech	Fox Stanton	0–4	2–5–1		

== Teams ==
=== Redlands ===
1940 Redlands Bulldogs football

SCC champion
- Conference: Southern California Conference
- Record: 4–4–1 (3–0–1 SCC)
- Head coach: Cecil A. Cushman (10th season)

The 1940 Redlands Bulldogs football team that represented the University of Redlands of Redlands, California. In their 11th season under head coach Cecil A. Cushman, the team compiled a 4–4–1 record (3–0–1 against SCC opponents), won the SCC championship, and outscored opponents by a total of 115 to 83.

Three Redlands players were selected by Ray Canton for first-team, all-conference honors: halfback Alvin Chang; guard Herb Morelli; and center John Hoffman.

Redlands was ranked at No. 257 (out of 697 college football teams) in the final rankings under the Litkenhous Difference by Score system for 1940.

Date	Opponent	Site	Result	Attendance	Source
September 20	at Loyola (CA)	Gilmore Stadium; Los Angeles, CA	L 0–13	12,000	
October 5	at San Diego Marines	San Diego, CA	L 0–13		
October 12	La Verne	Redlands, CA	W 7–0		
October 19	at San Diego State	Aztec Bowl; San Diego, CA	L 14–20	6,000	
October 26	at Pomona	Alumni Field; Pomona, CA	W 27–6		
November 2	Occidental	Redlands, CA	W 13–6		
November 9	at Whittier	Whittier, CA	T 0–0	6,000	
November 15	Caltech	Redlands, CA	W 40–0		
November 23	at New Mexico A&M	Quesenberry Field; Las Cruces, NM	L 14–25		

=== Pomona ===
1940 Pomona Sagehens football
- Conference: Southern California Conference
- Record: 4–4 (3–1 SCC)
- Head coach: Earl J. Merritt (6th season)

The 1940 Pomona Sagehens football team that represented Pomona College of Pomona, California. In their sixth season under head coach Earl J. Merritt, the Sagehens compiled a 4–4 record (3–1 against SCC opponents), finished in second place in the SCC, and were outscored by a total of 139 to 83.

Two Pomona players received first-team honors on the all-conference team: halfback Fred Stuedler and end Dick Strehle.

Pomona was ranked at No. 406 (out of 697 college football teams) in the final rankings under the Litkenhous Difference by Score system for 1940.

Date	Opponent	Site	Result	Attendance	Source
September 20	at Santa Barbara*	La Playa Stadium; Santa Barbara, CA	L 0–19		
September 27	at San Diego State*	Aztec Bowl; San Diego, CA	L 3–33	6,000	
October 5	La Verne*	Alumni Field; Claremont, CA	W 33–0		
October 12	at San Diego Marines*	San Diego, CA	L 0–47	6,000	
October 19	Caltech	Alumni Field; Claremont, CA	W 23–6		
October 26	Redlands	Alumni Field; Pomona, CA	L 6–27		
November 2	at Whittier	Hadley Field; Whittier, CA	W 12–7		
November 16	Occidental	Patterson Field; Los Angeles, CA	W 6–0		
*Non-conference game

=== Occidental ===
1940 Occidental Tigers football
- Conference: Southern California Conference
- Record: 3–4–1 (2–2 SCC)
- Head coach: Gus Henderson (1st season)
- Home stadium: Patterson Field

The 1940 Occidental Tigers football team that represented Occidental College of Los Angeles, California. In their first season under head coach Gus Henderson, the Tigers compiled a 3–4–1 record (2–2 against SCC opponents), finished in third place in the SCC, and were outscored by a total of 91 to 58.

Three Occidental players received first-team honors on the all-conference team: back Keith Beebe; end Morgan Odell; and tackle Burt Jones.

Occidental was ranked at No. 342 (out of 697 college football teams) in the final rankings under the Litkenhous Difference by Score system for 1940.

Date	Opponent	Site	Result	Attendance	Source
September 28	at Santa Barbara	La Playa Field; Santa Barbara, CA	L 13–27		
October 4	at San Diego State	Aztec Bowl; San Diego, CA	L 0–20	6,000	
October 12	Cal Aggies	D.W. Patterson Field; Los Angeles, CA	T 6–6		
October 26	Whittier	Patterson Field; Los Angeles, CA	W 7–6		
November 2	at Redlands	Redlands, CA	L 6–13		
November 8	at Caltech	Rose Bowl; Pasadena, CA	W 26–13	2,500	
November 16	Pomona	Patterson Field; Los Angeles, CA	L 0–6		
November 30	at Colorado College	Washburn Field; Colorado Springs, CO	W 25–6		

=== Whittier ===
1940 Whittier Poets football
- Conference: Southern California Conference
- Record: 2–6–1 (1–2–1 SCC)
- Head coach: Wallace Newman (12th season)
- Home stadium: Hadley Field

The 1940 Whittier Poets football team that represented Whittier College of Whittier, California. In their 12th season under head coach Wallace Newman, the team compiled a 2–6–1 record (1–2–1 against SCC opponents), finished in fourth place in the SCC, and were outscored by a total of 110 to 39.

Two Whittier players received first-team honors on the all-conference team: tackle Ralph Garman and guard Fred Shaheen.

Whittier was ranked at No. 344 (out of 697 college football teams) in the final rankings under the Litkenhous Difference by Score system for 1940.

Date	Opponent	Site	Result	Attendance	Source
September 28	at Fresno State	Ratcliffe Stadium; Fresno, CA	L 7–13	7,946	
October 4	at Caltech	Rose Bowl; Pasadena, CA	W 19–0	1,500	
October 11	at Loyola	Gilmore Stadium; Los Angeles, CA	L 0–18	10,000	
October 26	at Occidental	Patterson Field; Los Angeles, CA	L 6–7		
November 2	Pomona	Hadley Field; Whittier, CA	L 7–12		
November 9	Redlands	Whittier, CA	T 0–0	6,000	
November 16	San Diego State	Hadley Field; Whittier, CA	L 0–33		
November 22	at San Diego Marines	San Diego, CA	L 0–33		
November 30	Willamette	Hadley Field; Whittier, CA	W 14–7	3,000	

=== Caltech ===
1940 Caltech Beavers football
- Conference: Southern California Conference
- Record: 2–5–1 (0–4 SCC)
- Head coach: Fox Stanton (20th season)
- Home stadium: Rose Bowl

The 1940 Caltech Beavers football team that represented the California Institute of Technology of Pasadena, California. In their 20th year under head coach Fox Stanton, the Beavers compiled a 2–5–1 record (0–4 against SCC opponents), finished in last place in the SCC, and were outscored by a total of 154 to 48.

Caltech fullback Stan Sohler received first-team honors on the all-conference team.

Date	Opponent	Site	Result	Attendance	Source
September 20	at Cal Poly*	Mustang Stadium; San Luis Obispo, CA	W 12–7		
September 28	Glendale (CA)*	Rose Bowl; Pasadena, CA	T 7–7	1,500	
October 4	Whittier	Rose Bowl; Pasadena, CA	L 0–19	1,500	
October 12	at Arizona State–Flagstaff*	Skidmore Field; Flagstaff, AZ	L 14–33		
October 19	at Pomona	Alunni Field; Claremont, CA	L 6–23		
October 26	at La Verne*	La Verne, CA	W 7–0		
November 8	Occidental	Rose Bowl; Pasadena, CA	L 13–26	2,500	
November 15	at Redlands	Redlands, CA	L 0–40		
*Non-conference game

== All-conference selections ==
Ray Canton in The Whittier News selected the following first-team players to the All-Southern California Conference football team:

- Back - Keith Beebe, Occidental
- Halfbacks - Alvin Chang, Redlands; Fred Stuedler, Pomona
- Fullback - Stan Sohler, Caltech
- Ends - Dick Strehle, Pomona; Morgan Odell, Occidental
- Tackles - Burt Jones, Occidental; Ralph Garman, Whittier
- Guards - Herb Morelli, Redlands; Fred Shaheen, Whittier
- Center - John Hoffman, Redlands
