= Schubert R. Dyche =

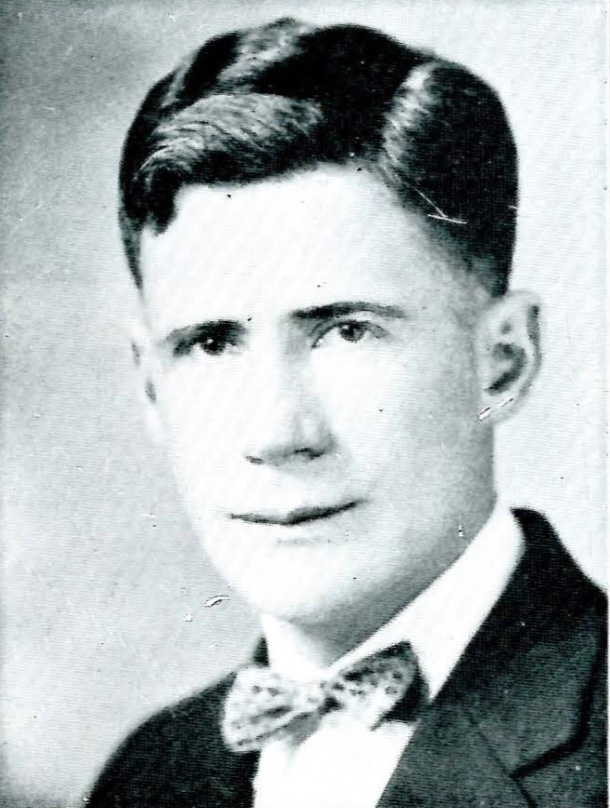
- Dyche from the 1930 Montanan

Biographical details
- Born: February 11, 1893; Topeka, Kansas, U.S.
- Died: October 19, 1982 (aged 89); Scotland, United Kingdom
- Education: Montana State University (1923)

Coaching career (HC unless noted)

Football
- 1928–1935: Montana State
- 1938–1941: Montana State

Basketball
- 1924–1928: Montana State (assistant)
- 1928–1935: Montana State

Administrative career (AD unless noted)
- 1928–1941: Montana State
- 1946–1951: Montana State

Head coaching record
- Overall: 36–53–7 (football); 110–93 (basketball)

Accomplishments and honors

Championships
- Football; 1 RMC (1938) Basketball; 1 Helms National (1929); 1 RMC (1929); 2 RMC Western Division (1929–1930)

Schubert Reilley Dyche (February 11, 1893 – October 19, 1982) was an American college football and college basketball coach and athletics administrator, all at Montana State University, from the 1920s through 1940s. In football, he compiled a record of 36–53–7, and led his team to one conference championship during the 1938 season. In basketball, he recorded a 110–93 record. His 1928–29 Bobcats team finished the season with a 36–2 record, was retroactively named the national champion by the Helms Athletic Foundation, and was retroactively listed as the top team of the season by the Premo-Porretta Power Poll. That squad is considered to be one of the greatest college teams in the first half of the 20th century.

Dyche was born in Topeka, Kansas and grew up in southern Colorado. He attended the University of Colorado before moving to Montana in 1923, where he received a bachelor's degree from Montana State in 1923. Dyche also taught in the physical education department at Montana State and was a part-time coach for the baseball team. After retiring in 1961, he moved to France and then Scotland. He died on October 19, 1982, in Scotland.

== Head coaching record ==
=== Football ===
Year	Team	Overall	Conference	Standing	Bowl/playoffs
Montana State Bobcats (Rocky Mountain Conference) (1928–1935)
1928	Montana State	4–4–1	3–2	6th	
1929	Montana State	6–2	2–1	N/A^{[a]}	
1930	Montana State	6–3	1–1	N/A^{[a]}	
1931	Montana State	1–5–1	0–2	N/A^{[a]}	
1932	Montana State	3–3–1	0–3	N/A^{[a]}	
1933	Montana State	2–5	1–3	N/A^{[a]}	
1934	Montana State	2–5	0–4	N/A^{[a]}	
1935	Montana State	2–6–1	1–5	9th	
Montana State Bobcats (Rocky Mountain Conference) (1938–1941)
1938	Montana State	3–5–1	1–0–1	1st	
1939	Montana State	2–7	0–2	4th	
1940	Montana State	4–4	2–1	3rd	
1941	Montana State	1–4–2	1–2–1	T–3rd	
Montana State:		36–53–7	14–27–2		
Total:		36–53–7			

^{a} The minimum number of conference games needed to be played to compete for the conference championship was five.

=== Basketball ===
Record table
Season	Team	Overall	Conference	Standing	Postseason
Montana State Bobcats (Rocky Mountain Conference) (1928–1935)
1928–29	Montana State	36–2	11–1	1st (Western)	Helms National Champions
1929–30	Montana State	21–10	7–5	T–1st (Western)	
1930–31	Montana State	9–13	2–10	4th (Western)	
1931–32	Montana State	14–15	6–6	3rd (Western)	
1932–33	Montana State	9–18	2–10	T–4th (Western)	
1933–34	Montana State	5–22	1–11	4th (Western)	
1934–35	Montana State	16–13	4–8	4th (Western)	
Montana State:		110–93	33–51		
Total:		110–93 (.542)			
National champion Postseason invitational champion Conference regular season champion Conference regular season and conference tournament champion Division regular season champion Division regular season and conference tournament champion Conference tournament champion
