= 1940 San Diego State Aztecs football team =

American college football season

1940 San Diego State Aztecs football
- Conference: California Collegiate Athletic Association
- Record: 5–3–1 (1–1–1 CCAA)
- Head coach: Leo Calland (6th season)
- Home stadium: Aztec Bowl

1940 California Collegiate Athletic Association football standings
	Conf.					Overall
Team	W		L		T	W		L		T
San Jose State $	3	–	0	–	0	11	–	1	–	0
Fresno State	1	–	1	–	1	9	–	2	–	1
San Diego State	1	–	1	–	1	5	–	3	–	1
Santa Barbara State	0	–	3	–	0	5	–	5	–	0
$ – Conference champion

The 1940 San Diego State Aztecs football team represented San Diego State College (Note: San Diego State University was known as San Diego State College from 1935 to 1971.) during the 1940 college football season.

San Diego State competed in the California Collegiate Athletic Association (CCAA). The 1940 team was led by head coach Leo B. Calland in his sixth season with the Aztecs. They played home games at two sites, Aztec Bowl and Balboa Stadium in San Diego, California. The Aztecs finished the season with five wins, three losses and one tie (5–3–1, 1–1–1 CCAA). Overall, the team outscored its opponents 128–87 for the season.

San Diego State was ranked at No. 146 (out of 697 college football teams) in the final rankings under the Litkenhous Difference by Score system for 1940.

== Schedule ==
Date	Opponent	Site	Result	Attendance	Source
September 27	Pomona*	Aztec Bowl; San Diego, CA	W 33–3	6,000	
October 4	Occidental*	Aztec Bowl; San Diego, CA	W 20–0	6,000	
October 11	at San Jose State	Spartan Stadium; San Jose, CA	L 0–10	7,000	
October 19	Redlands*^{†}	Aztec Bowl; San Diego, CA	W 20–14	4,000	
October 25	Fresno State	Balboa Stadium; San Diego, CA (rivalry)	T 0–0	3,000	
November 8	at San Diego Marines*	Balboa Stadium; San Diego, CA	L 6–20	12,000	
November 16	at Whittier*	Hadley Field; Whittier, CA	W 33–0		
November 23	at Santa Barbara State	La Playa Stadium; Santa Barbara, CA	W 9–7	4,000	
December 7	at Hawaii*	Honolulu Stadium; Honolulu, Territory of Hawaii	L 7–33	22,000	
*Non-conference game; ^{†}Homecoming
