= 1939 San Diego State Aztecs football team =

American college football season

1939 San Diego State Aztecs football
- Conference: California Collegiate Athletic Association
- Record: 2–7 (0–2 CCAA)
- Head coach: Leo Calland (5th season)
- Home stadium: Aztec Bowl

1939 California Collegiate Athletic Association football standings
	Conf.					Overall
Team	W		L		T	W		L		T
San Jose State $	3	–	0	–	0	13	–	0	–	0
Fresno State	1	–	1	–	0	10	–	1	–	0
Santa Barbara State	1	–	2	–	0	5	–	4	–	1
San Diego State	0	–	2	–	0	2	–	7	–	0
$ – Conference champion

The 1939 San Diego State Aztecs football team represented San Diego State College (Note: San Diego State University was known as San Diego State College from 1935 to 1971.) during the 1939 college football season.

San Diego State competed in the inaugural season of the California Collegiate Athletic Association (CCAA). They had competed in the Southern California Intercollegiate Athletic Conference (SCIAC) for the previous 13 years. The 1939 team was led by head coach Leo B. Calland in his fifth season with the Aztecs. They played home games at Aztec Bowl in San Diego, California. The Aztecs finished the season with two wins and seven losses (2–7, 0–2 CCAA). Overall, the team was outscored by its opponents 60–148 for the season.

San Diego State was ranked at No. 235 (out of 609 teams) in the final Litkenhous Ratings for 1939.

== Schedule ==
Date	Opponent	Site	Result	Attendance	Source
September 21	Arizona State*	Aztec Bowl; San Diego, CA	L 0–20	3,500	
September 29	Redlands*	Aztec Bowl; San Diego, CA	W 26–0	3,500	
October 6	Occidental*	Aztec Bowl; San Diego, CA	W 10–6	3,000	
October 13	at San Jose State	Spartan Stadium; San Jose, CA	L 0–42	8,000	
October 28	Pomona*^{†}	Aztec Bowl; San Diego, CA	L 6–12	4,500	
November 4	Whittier*	Aztec Bowl; San Diego, CA	L 12–23	6,000	
November 11	at San Diego Marines*	Balboa Stadium; San Diego, CA	L 6–13	8,000	
November 15	Hawaii*	Aztec Bowl; San Diego, CA	L 0–13	4,000	
November 25	Santa Barbara State	Aztec Bowl; San Diego, CA	L 0–19	4,000	
*Non-conference game; ^{†}Homecoming
