= 1940 Cal Aggies football team =

American college football season

1940 Cal Aggies football
- Conference: Far Western Conference
- Record: 4–4–1 (2–1 FWC)
- Head coach: Vern Hickey (4th season)
- Captain: Bob Fryer
- Home stadium: A Street field

1940 Far Western Conference football standings
	Conf.					Overall
Team	W		L		T	W		L		T
Pacific (CA) $	2	–	0	–	0	4	–	5	–	0
Cal Aggies	2	–	1	–	0	4	–	4	–	1
Chico State	1	–	2	–	0	3	–	3	–	1
Humboldt State	0	–	2	–	0	3	–	4	–	0
$ – Conference champion

The 1940 Cal Aggies football team represented the College of Agriculture at Davis—now known as the University of California, Davis—as a member of the Far Western Conference (FWC) during the 1940 college football season. Led by fourth-year head coach Vern Hickey, the Aggies compiled an overall record of 4–4 with a mark of 2–1 in conference play, placing second in the FWC. The team outscored its opponents 120 to 81 for the season.

The Cal Aggies were ranked at No. 301 (out of 697 college football teams) in the final rankings under the Litkenhous Difference by Score system for 1940.

The Cal Aggies played home games at A Street field on campus in Davis, California.

== Schedule ==
Date	Opponent	Site	Result	Source
September 21	at Arizona State*	Goodwin Stadium; Tempe, AZ	L 13–21	
September 28	at California JV (Note: The University of California JV team was commonly known as the "Cal Ramblers".)*	California Memorial Stadium; Berkeley, CA	L 7–15	
October 5	San Francisco State*	A Street field; Davis, CA	W 35–0	
October 12	at Occidental*	D.W. Patterson Field; Los Angeles, CA	T 6–6	
October 18	at Humboldt State	Albee Stadium; Eureka, CA	W 20–0	
November 2	Pacific (CA)^{†}	A Street field; Davis, CA	L 6–7	
November 9	Santa Barbara State*	A Street field; Davis, CA	W 14–6	
November 16	at Cal Poly*	Mustang Stadium; San Luis Obispo, CA (rivalry)	L 7–20	
November 21	at Chico State	Chico High School Stadium; Chico, CA	W 12–6	
*Non-conference game; ^{†}Homecoming
