= 1940 Chico State Wildcats football team =

American college football season

1940 Chico State Wildcats football
- Conference: Far Western Conference
- Record: 3–3–1 (1–2 FWC)
- Head coach: Roy Bohler (2nd season)
- Home stadium: College Field

1940 Far Western Conference football standings
	Conf.					Overall
Team	W		L		T	W		L		T
Pacific (CA) $	2	–	0	–	0	4	–	5	–	0
Cal Aggies	2	–	1	–	0	4	–	4	–	1
Chico State	1	–	2	–	0	3	–	3	–	1
Humboldt State	0	–	2	–	0	3	–	4	–	0
$ – Conference champion

The 1940 Chico State Wildcats football team represented Chico State College—now known as California State University, Chico—as a member of the Far Western Conference (FWC) during the 1940 college football season. Led by second-year head coach Roy Bohler, Chico State compiled an overall record of 3–3–1 with a mark of 1–2 in conference play, placing third in the FWC. The team was outscored by its opponents 65 to 44 for the season.

Chico State was ranked at No. 449 (out of 697 college football teams) in the final rankings under the Litkenhous Difference by Score system for 1940.

The Wildcats played home games at College Field in Chico, California.

== Schedule ==
Date	Opponent	Site	Result	Source
October 12	at Sacramento*	Sacramento Stadium; Sacramento, CA	W 6–0	
October 19	San Francisco State*^{†}	College Field; Chico, CA	W 12–0	
October 26	Sacramento Athletic Club*	College Field; Chico, CA	T 6–6	
November 1	at Cal Poly*	Mustang Stadium; San Luis Obispo, CA	L 7–20	
November 11	Humboldt State	College Field; Chico, CA	W 7–0	
November 21	Cal Aggies	College Field; Chico, CA	L 6–12	
November 29	Pacific (CA)	College Field; Chico, CA	L 0–27	
*Non-conference game; ^{†}Homecoming
