= Bill Anderson (American coach) =

American sports coach (1891–1969)

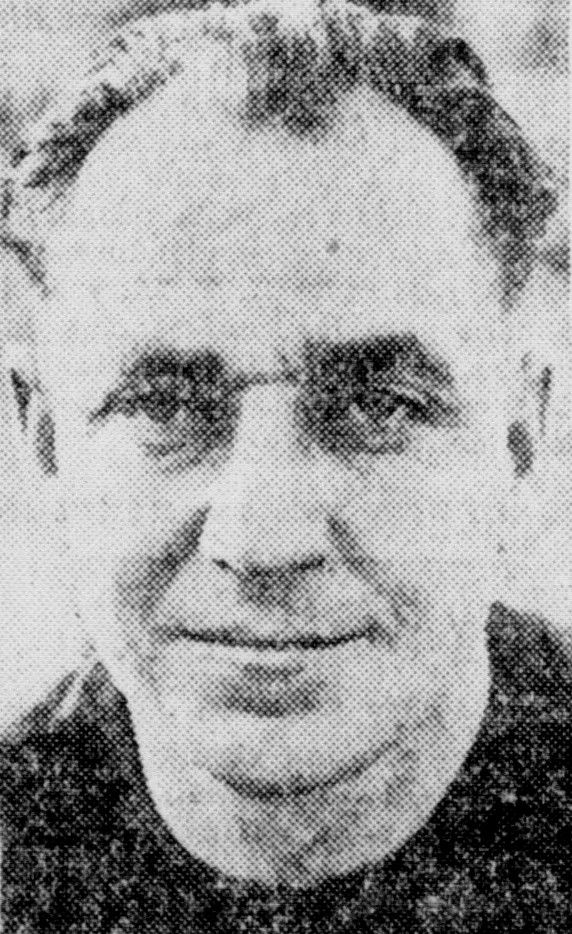
- Anderson, circa 1935

Biographical details
- Born: September 28, 1891; Ohio, Illinois, U.S.
- Died: September 17, 1969 (aged 77); Los Angeles County, California, U.S.

Playing career

Football
- 1915–1916: Illinois
- Position: Halfback

Coaching career (HC unless noted)

Football
- 1932–1939: Occidental

Administrative career (AD unless noted)
- 1939–1954: Occidental

Head coaching record
- Overall: 23–35–7 (football)

William Wilson Anderson (September 17, 1891 – September 17, 1969) was an American football, basketball, and baseball coach. He served as the head football coach at Occidental College from 1932 to 1939. Anderson played college football at the University of Illinois from 1915 to 1916 under head coach Robert Zuppke. Anderson was born in Ohio, Illinois. He died on September 17, 1969, at the age of 77.

== Head coaching record ==
=== Football ===
Year	Team	Overall	Conference	Standing	Bowl/playoffs
Occidental Tigers (Southern California Conference) (1932–1939)
1932	Occidental	4–4–1	4–2–1	4th	
1933	Occidental	2–6	2–5	T–5th	
1934	Occidental	3–5	2–2	3rd	
1935	Occidental	3–3–2	1–2–1	5th	
1936	Occidental	3–5–1	1–4	5th	
1937	Occidental	2–2–3	1–2–2	5th	
1938	Occidental	3–5	1–4	5th	
1939	Occidental	3–5	2–2	T–3rd	
Occidental:		23–35–7	14–23–4		
Total:		23–35–7			
