= 1940 Fresno State Bulldogs football team =

American college football season

1940 Fresno State Bulldogs football

Pineapple Bowl, W 20–0 vs. Hawaii
- Conference: California Collegiate Athletic Association
- Record: 9–2–1 (1–1–1 CCAA)
- Head coach: James Bradshaw (5th season)
- Home stadium: Ratcliffe Stadium

1940 California Collegiate Athletic Association football standings
	Conf.					Overall
Team	W		L		T	W		L		T
San Jose State $	3	–	0	–	0	11	–	1	–	0
Fresno State	1	–	1	–	1	9	–	2	–	1
San Diego State	1	–	1	–	1	5	–	3	–	1
Santa Barbara State	0	–	3	–	0	5	–	5	–	0
$ – Conference champion

The 1940 Fresno State Bulldogs football team represented Fresno State Normal School—now known as California State University, Fresno—during the 1940 college football season.

Fresno State competed in the California Collegiate Athletic Association (CCAA). The team was led by fifth-year head coach James Bradshaw and played home games at Ratcliffe Stadium on the campus of Fresno City College in Fresno, California. They finished the season with a record of nine wins, two losses and one tie (9–2–1, 1–1–1 CCAA). The Bulldogs outscored their opponents 132–52 for the season, including six shutouts and holding the other team to less than 10 points in 10 of 12 games.

At the end of the season, the Bulldogs made a two-game trip to Hawaii, including the January 1, 1941 Pineapple Bowl game against Hawaii. Fresno State did not give up a point in either of the two games in Hawaii.

Fresno State was ranked at No. 126 (out of 697 college football teams) in the final rankings under the Litkenhous Difference by Score system for 1940.

== Schedule ==
Date	Time	Opponent	Site	Result	Attendance	Source
September 28		Whittier*	Ratcliffe Stadium; Fresno, CA	W 13–7	7,946	
October 5		Santa Barbara State	Ratcliffe Stadium; Fresno, CA	W 20–0	7,596	
October 12	8:00 p.m.	West Texas State*	Ratcliffe Stadium; Fresno, CA	W 15–6	9,625–11,000	
October 18		at Pacific (CA)*	Baxter Stadium; Stockton, CA	W 3–0	10,000	
October 25		at San Diego State	Balboa Stadium; San Diego, CA (rivalry)	T 0–0	4,000	
November 2		Nevada*	Ratcliffe Stadium; Fresno, CA	W 7–6	5,732	
November 11		Texas Mines*	Ratcliffe Stadium; Fresno, CA	W 16–6	10,024	
November 16		San Jose State	Ratcliffe Stadium; Fresno, CA (rivalry)	L 7–14	12,276–15,000	
November 21		Colorado Mines*	Ratcliffe Stadium; Fresno, CA	W 28–0	7,256	
December 7		at Arkansas State Teachers*	Estes Stadium; Little Rock, AR	L 0–13	2,500	
December 25		at Healani Athletic Club*	Honolulu Stadium; Honolulu, Territory of Hawaii	W 20–0	13,000	
January 1		at Hawaii*	Honolulu Stadium; Honolulu, Territory of Hawaii (Pineapple Bowl, rivalry)	W 3–0	22,000	
*Non-conference game; All times are in Pacific time

== Team players in the NFL ==
The following Fresno State Bulldog players were selected in the 1941 NFL draft.

Player	Position	Round	Overall	NFL team
Jack Mulkey	End	15	139	Chicago Bears
