= John Mason (American football) =

Playing career
- 1921–1922: Oklahoma A&M
- 1924: Oklahoma A&M

Coaching career (HC unless noted)
- 1928–1936: Colorado (assistant)
- 1937–1946: Colorado Mines
- 1950–1951: Montana State

Head coaching record
- Overall: 24–40–3

Accomplishments and honors

Championships
- 2 RMC (1939, 1942)

John H. Mason was an American college football player and coach. He served as the head football coach at Colorado School of Mines from 1947 to 1946 and at Montana State University from 1950 to 1951, compiling a career head coaching record of 24–40–3. Mason graduated from Oklahoma Agricultural and Mechanical College—now known as Oklahoma State University–Stillwater–in 1925. He lettered in football and wrestling at Oklahoma A&M and was a member of the Gamma Lambda Chapter of Beta Theta Pi. Mason became an assistant football coach at University of Colorado Boulder in 1928. There he also coached wrestling and served as a chapter advisor for the Beta Tau Chapter of Beta Theta Pi.

== Head coaching record ==
=== College ===
Year	Team	Overall	Conference	Standing	Bowl/playoffs
Colorado Mines Orediggers (Rocky Mountain Conference) (1937–1946)
1937	Colorado Mines	2–5	1–5	10th	
1938	Colorado Mines	4–3	2–1	2nd	
1939	Colorado Mines	8–0	4–0	1st	
1940	Colorado Mines	3–4	3–1	2nd	
1941	Colorado Mines	2–4–2	1–2–1	T–3rd	
1942	Colorado Mines	3–4	2–0	T–1st	
1943	Colorado Mines	0–1	NA	NA	
1944	No team—World War II				
1945	No team—World War II				
1946	Colorado Mines	1–4–1	0–3	5th	
Colorado Mines:		23–25–3	13–12–1		
Montana State Bobcats (Rocky Mountain Conference) (1950–1951)
1950	Montana State	1–8	1–3	5th	
1951	Montana State	0–7	0–4	6th	
Montana State:		1–15	1–7		
Total:		24–40–3			
National championship Conference title Conference division title or championship game berth
