= Spud Harder =

American football and baseball coach (1906–1994)

Biographical details
- Born: March 7, 1906
- Died: February 13, 1994 (aged 87)

Playing career

Football
- 1926–1928: Stanford
- Position: End

Coaching career (HC unless noted)

Football
- 1929–1933: Bakersfield
- 1934–1940: Santa Barbara State

Baseball
- 1935–1948: Santa Barbara State / Santa Barbara
- 1950–1951: Santa Barbara

Administrative career (AD unless noted)
- 1949–1956: Santa Barbara

Head coaching record
- Overall: 33–27–6 (college football); 32–9–5 (junior college football)

Theodore "Spud" Harder (March 7, 1906 – February 13, 1994) was an American football and baseball coach and college athletic director. He served as the head football coach at Santa Barbara State College—now known as the University of California, Santa Barbara—from 1934 to 1940, compiling a record of 33–27–6. Harder was also the head baseball coach at Santa Barbara from 1935 to 1948 and again from 1950 to 1951. He was the school's athletic director from 1949 to 1956. Harder Stadium on the campus of the University of California, Santa Barbara in Santa Barbara, California was named his honor in 1981.

A native of Bakersfield, California, Harder graduated from Bakersfield High School in 1925. He played college football as an end at Stanford University under head coach Pop Warner from 1926 to 1928. Harder began his coaching career in 1929 at Bakersfield Junior College—now known as Bakersfield College.

== Head coaching record ==
=== College football ===
| Year | Team | Overall | Conference | Standing | Bowl/playoffs |
|---|---|---|---|---|---|
Santa Barbara State Roadrunners/Gauchos (Southern California Conference) (1934–1937)
| 1934 | Santa Barbara State | 2–5–1 | 0–4 | 6th | |
| 1935 | Santa Barbara State | 5–2–2 | 2–2–1 | T–3rd | |
| 1936 | Santa Barbara State | 9–1 | 4–1 | 2nd | |
| 1937 | Santa Barbara State | 5–2–2 | 3–1–1 | 2nd | |
Santa Barbara State Gauchos (Independent) (1938)
| 1938 | Santa Barbara State | 2–8 | | | |
Santa Barbara State Gauchos (California Collegiate Athletic Association) (1939–1940)
| 1939 | Santa Barbara State | 5–4–1 | 1–2 | 3rd | |
| 1940 | Santa Barbara State | 5–5 | 0–3 | 4th | |
| Santa Barbara State: | | 33–27–6 | 10–13–2 | | |
| Total: | | 33–27–6 | | | |
