= 1940 San Jose State Spartans football team =

American college football season

1940 San Jose State Spartans football

CCAA champion
- Conference: California Collegiate Athletic Association
- Record: 11–1 (3–0 CCAA)
- Head coach: Ben Winkelman (1st season)
- Home stadium: Spartan Stadium

1940 California Collegiate Athletic Association football standings
	Conf.					Overall
Team	W		L		T	W		L		T
San Jose State $	3	–	0	–	0	11	–	1	–	0
Fresno State	1	–	1	–	1	9	–	2	–	1
San Diego State	1	–	1	–	1	5	–	3	–	1
Santa Barbara State	0	–	3	–	0	5	–	5	–	0
$ – Conference champion

The 1940 San Jose State Spartans football team represented San Jose State College (Note: San Jose State University was known as San Jose State College from 1935 to 1971.) during the 1940 college football season.

San Jose State competed in the California Collegiate Athletic Association. The team was led by head coach Ben Winkelman, in his first year, and they played home games at Spartan Stadium in San Jose, California. They finished the season as champions of the CCAA, with a record of eleven wins and one loss (11–1, 3–0 CCAA). The Spartans dominated their opponents, scoring 263 points for the season while giving up only 62. In 10 of the 12 games, their opponents scored a touchdown or less, including four shutouts.

San Jose was ranked at No. 74 (out of 697 college football teams) in the final rankings under the Litkenhous Difference by Score system for 1940.

Famed football coach Glenn Scobey "Pop" Warner was an advisory coach for the Spartans in 1939 and 1940, helping the team to a 24–1 record over the two seasons.

== Schedule ==
Date	Time	Opponent	Site	Result	Attendance	Source
September 16		Texas A&I*	Spartan Stadium; San Jose, CA	L 0–10		
September 23		vs. Montana State*	Butte High Stadium; Butte, MT	W 34–0	4,000	
September 28	1:30 p.m.	at Utah State*	Aggie Stadium (Note: This stadium is the predecessor to the current Maverik Stadium (Romney Stadium) that has served as the home of the Aggies since 1968); Logan, UT	W 19–0	4,000	
October 4		at Willamette	Multnomah Stadium; Portland, OR	W 21–0		
October 11		San Diego State	Spartan Stadium; San Jose, CA	W 10–0	7,000	
October 18		at San Francisco*	Kezar Stadium; San Francisco, CA	W 7–6	6,000	
October 25		at Santa Barbara State	La Playa Stadium; Santa Barbara, CA	W 33–6		
November 1		at Loyola (CA)*	Gilmore Stadium; Los Angeles, CA	W 27–12	10,000	
November 8		Pacific (CA)	Spartan Stadium; San Jose, CA (rivalry)	W 28–7	12,000	
November 16		at Fresno State	Ratcliffe Stadium; Fresno, CA (rivary)	W 14–7	12,276–15,000	
November 21		South Dakota*	Spartan Stadium; San Jose, CA (Prune Bowl)	W 40–7	6,000	
November 29		Nevada*	Spartan Stadium; San Jose, CA	W 30–7		
*Non-conference game; All times are in Pacific time

== Team players in the NFL ==
The following San Jose State players were selected in the 1941 NFL draft.

Player	Position	Round	Overall	NFL team
Deward Tornell	Back	14	130	Washington Redskins
Morris Buckingham	Center	15	140	Washington Redskins

The following player ended his San Jose State career in 1940, was not drafted, but played in the NFL.

Player	Position	NFL team
Bernie Nygren	Halfback – Defensive back	1946 Los Angeles Dons
