= 1940 Rocky Mountain Conference football season =

American college football season

Rocky Mountain Conference
- Sport: Football
- Teams: 5
- Champion: Colorado College

Football seasons
- 1939 1941

1940 Rocky Mountain Conference football standings
| | Conf. | | | | | Overall |
| Team | W | | L | | T | W | | L | | T |
|---|---|---|---|---|---|---|---|---|---|---|
| Colorado College $ | 2 | – | 0 | – | 1 | 5 | – | 2 | – | 1 |
| Colorado Mines | 3 | – | 1 | – | 0 | 3 | – | 4 | – | 0 |
| Montana State | 2 | – | 1 | – | 0 | 4 | – | 4 | – | 0 |
| Colorado State–Greeley | 1 | – | 3 | – | 0 | 2 | – | 5 | – | 1 |
| Western State (CO) | 0 | – | 3 | – | 1 | 2 | – | 6 | – | 1 |
$ – Conference champion

The 1940 Rocky Mountain Conference football season was the season of college football played by the five member schools of the Rocky Mountain Conference (RMC) as part of the 1940 college football season.

The Colorado College Tigers, led by head coach Clark DeGroot, won the RMC championship with a 5–2–1 record (2–0–1 against conference opponents). End Tom Pelican and halfback Don Heizer received first-team honors on the All-Rocky Mountain Conference team.

The Colorado Mines Orediggers, led by John Mason, finished in second place with a 3–4 record (3–1 against RMC opponents). The conference championship was decided on October 19 when the Orediggers lost to Colorado College, 28–21, at Washburn Field in Colorado Springs. Four Colorado Mines players, including quarterback Joe Berta, received first-team honors on the 1940 All-Rocky Mountain Conference football team.

== Conference overview ==
| Conf. rank | Team | Head coach | Conf. record | Overall record | Points scored | Points against |
|---|---|---|---|---|---|---|
| 1 | Colorado College | Clark DeGroot | 2-0–1 | 5–2–1 | | |
| 2 | Colorado Mines | John Mason | 3–1 | 3–4 | | |
| 3 | Montana State | Schubert R. Dyche | 2–1 | 4–4 | | |
| 4 | Colorado State–Greeley | John W. Hancock | 1–3 | 2–5–1 | | |
| 5 | Western State (CO) | Paul Wright | 0–3–1 | 2–6–1 | | |

== Teams ==
=== Colorado College ===
1940 Colorado College Tigers football

RMC champion
- Conference: Rocky Mountain Conference
- Record: 5–2–1 (2–0–1 RMC)
- Head coach: Clark DeGroot (1st season)
- Home stadium: Washburn Field

The 1940 Colorado College Tigers football team represented Colorado College of Colorado Springs, Colorado. In their first and only season under head coach Clark DeGroot, the Tigers compiled a 5–2–1 record (2–0–1 against RMC opponents) and won the RMC championship. The team played its home games at Washburn Field in Colorado Springs.

End Tom Pelican and halfback Don Heizer received first-team honors on the All-Rocky Mountain Conference team. Despite his size (five feet, six inches, and 156 pounds), Heizer was rated highly by opposing coaches "for his driving ball carrying, his pass catching and his general defensive play."

Colorado College was ranked at No. 328 (out of 697 college football teams) in the final rankings under the Litkenhous Difference by Score system for 1940.

| Date | Opponent | Site | Result | Attendance | Source |
|---|---|---|---|---|---|
| September 27 | Baker* | Washburn Field; Colorado Springs, CO | W 16–0 | | |
| October 5 | New Mexico Normal* | Washburn Field; Colorado Springs, CO | W 37–7 | | |
| October 12 | at Whitman* | Walla Walla, WA | W 6–0 | | |
| October 19 | Colorado Mines^{†} | Washburn Field; Colorado Springs, CO | W 28–21 | 4,214 | |
| November 2 | at Western State | Gunnison, CO | T 0–0 | | |
| November 11 | Colorado State-Greeley | Washburn Field; Colorado Springs, CO | W 20–7 | | |
| November 23 | at Grinnell* | Grinnell, IA | L 12–26 | 500 | |
| November 30 | Occidental* | Washburn Field; Colorado Springs, CO | L 6–25 | | |
*Non-conference game; ^{†}Homecoming

=== Colorado Mines ===
1940 Colorado Mines Orediggers football
- Conference: Rocky Mountain Conference
- Record: 3–4 (3–1 RMC)
- Head coach: John Mason (4th season)
- Home stadium: Campbell Field

The 1940 Colorado Mines Orediggers football team represented the Colorado School of Mines of Golden, Colorado. In their fourth season under head coach John Mason, the Orediggers compiled a 3–4 record (3–1 against RMC opponents) and finished in second place in the RMC. The team played its home games at Campbell Field in Golden.

Four Colorado Mines players received first-team honors from the Associated Press on the 1940 All-Rocky Mountain Conference football team. They were: quarterback Joe Berta; end Louis DeGoes; tackle Dick Moe; and center Glen Hutchinson.

Colorado Mines was ranked at No. 387 (out of 697 college football teams) in the final rankings under the Litkenhous Difference by Score system for 1940.

| Date | Opponent | Site | Result | Attendance | Source |
|---|---|---|---|---|---|
| September 28 | vs. Colorado A&M* | Denver University Stadium; Denver, CO | L 0–25 | | |
| October 5 | at Creighton* | Creighton Stadium; Omaha, NE | L 0–43 | | |
| October 12 | Colorado State-Greeley | Campbell Field; Golden, CO | W 12–7 | | |
| October 19 | at Colorado College^{†} | Washburn Field; Colorado Springs, CO | L 21–28 | 4,214 | |
| November 2 | Montana State | Campbell Field; Golden, CO | W 20–7 | | |
| November 9 | at Western State | Gunnison, CO | W 12–0 | | |
| November 21 | at Fresno State | Ratcliffe Stadium; Fresno, CA | L 0–28 | 7,256 | |
*Non-conference game; ^{†}Homecoming

=== Montana State ===
1940 Montana State Bobcats football
- Conference: Rocky Mountain Conference
- Record: 4–4 (2–1 RMC)
- Head coach: Schubert R. Dyche (11th season)
- Home stadium: Gatton Field

The 1940 Montana State Bobcats football team represented Montana State College (later renamed Montana State University) of Bozeman, Montana. In their 11th season under head coach Schubert R. Dyche, the Bobcats compiled a 4–4 record.

Montana State was ranked at No. 397 (out of 697 college football teams) in the final rankings under the Litkenhous Difference by Score system for 1940.

| Date | Opponent | Site | Result | Attendance | Source |
|---|---|---|---|---|---|
| September 21 | Western State (CO) | Gatton Field; Bozeman, MT | W 12–0 | | |
| September 23 | San Jose State* | Butte High Stadium; Butte, MT | L 0–32 | 4,000 | |
| September 27 | at Drake* | Drake Stadium; Des Moines, IA | L 0–56 | 8,000 | |
| October 5 | North Dakota Agricultural*^{†} | Gatton Field; Bozeman, MT | W 7–0 | 2,500 | |
| October 19 | vs. Montana* | Butte High Stadium; Butte, MT (rivalry) | L 0–6 | 6,000 | |
| October 26 | Colorado State-Greeley | Gatton Field; Bozeman, MT | W 7–0 | | |
| November 2 | at Colorado Mines | Campbell Field; Golden, CO | L 7–20 | | |
| November 11 | at Idaho Southern Branch* | Spud Bowl; Pocatello, ID | W 15–7 | | |
*Non-conference game; ^{†}Homecoming

=== Colorado State–Greeley ===
1940 Colorado State–Greeley Bears football
- Conference: Rocky Mountain Conference
- Record: 2–5–1 (1–3 RMC)
- Head coach: John W. Hancock
- Home stadium: Jackson Field

The 1940 Colorado State–Greeley Bears football team represented Colorado State College at Greeley, Colorado (now known as the University of Northern Colorado). Led by head coach John W. Hancock, the Bears compiled a 2–5–1 record (1–3 against RMC opponents) and finished in fourth place in the RMC.

Halfback Sam Sears and fullback Horace Brelsford, both juniors, were selected by the Associated Press as first-team players on the 1940 All-Rocky Mountain Conference team.

The team played its home games at Jackson Field in Greeley, Colorado.

| Date | Opponent | Site | Result | Attendance | Source |
|---|---|---|---|---|---|
| October 4 | Idaho Southern* | Jackson Field; Greeley, CO | W 21–7 | | |
| October 12 | at Colorado Mines | Campbell Field; Golden, CO | L 7–12 | | |
| October 19 | Western State^{†} | Jackson Field; Greeley, Co | W 33–12 | | |
| October 26 | at Montana State | Gatton Field; Bozeman, MT | L 0–7 | | |
| November 2 | Fort Hays State | Jackson Field; Greeley, CO | T 0–0 | | |
| November 11 | at Colorado College | Colorado Springs, CO | L 7–20 | | |
| November 16 | at Arizona State | Goodwin Stadium; Tempe, AZ | L 0–41 | 5,000 | |
| November 23 | Regis* | Jackson Field; Greeley, CO | L 12–13 | | |
*Non-conference game; ^{†}Homecoming

=== Western State ===
1940 Western State Mountaineers football
- Conference: Rocky Mountain Conference
- Record: 2–6–1 (0–3–1 RMC)
- Head coach: Paul Wright (6th season)

The 1940 Western State Mountaineers football team represented Western State College of Colorado at Gunnison, Colorado (now known as the Western Colorado University). In their sixth year under head coach Paul Wright, the Mountaineers compiled a 2–6–1 record (0–3–1 against RMC opponents) and finished in fifth place in the RMC.

Western Colorado was ranked at No. 475 (out of 697 college football teams) in the final rankings under the Litkenhous Difference by Score system for 1940.

| Date | Opponent | Site | Result | Source |
|---|---|---|---|---|
| September 21 | at Montana State | Gatton Field; Bozeman, MT | L 0–12 | |
| September 28 | at Idaho Southern Branch* | Pocatello, ID | L 0–7 | |
| October 5 | West Texas State | Gunnison, CO | L 13–48 | |
| October 12 | Weber JC* | Gunnison, CO | L 0–13 | |
| October 19 | at Colorado State-Greeley | Jackson Field; Greeley, Co | L 12–33 | |
| October 26 | Regis* | Denver, CO | W 13–0 | |
| November 2 | Colorado College | Gunnison, CO | T 0–0 | |
| November 9 | Colorado Mines | Gunnison, CO | L 0–12 | |
*Non-conference game

== All-conference team ==
The Associated Press selected the following players as first-team honorees on the all-conference team.

- Quarterback - Joe Berta, Colorado Mines
- Halfbacks - Don Heizer, Colorado College; Sam Sears, Greeley
- Fullback - Horace Brelsford, Greeley
- Ends - Louis DeGoes, Colorado Mines; Tom Pelican, Colorado College
- Tackles - Dick Moe, Colorado Mines; Jack Burke, Montana State
- Guards - Rudy Aganski, Western State; Newell Berg, Montana State
- Center - Glen Hutchinson, Colorado Mines.
