= 1940 San Francisco State Staters football team =

American college football season

1940 San Francisco State Staters football
- Conference: Independent
- Record: 3–5
- Head coach: Dick Boyle (2nd season)
- Home stadium: Roberts Field

1940 Western college football independents records
	Conf.			Overall
Team	W	L	T	W		L		T
No. 11 Santa Clara		–		6	–	1	–	1
Cal Poly		–		6	–	3	–	0
Saint Mary's		–		5	–	3	–	0
Gonzaga		–		5	–	4	–	1
Nevada		–		4	–	4	–	1
Humboldt State		–		3	–	4	–	0
Idaho Southern Branch		–		3	–	5	–	0
San Francisco State		–		3	–	5	–	0
Loyola (CA)		–		3	–	7	–	0
Portland		–		2	–	3	–	1
Hawaii		–		2	–	5	–	0
San Francisco		–		1	–	6	–	1
La Verne		–		0	–	6	–	0
Rankings from AP Poll

The 1940 San Francisco State States football team represented San Francisco State College—now known as San Francisco State University—as an independent during the 1940 college football season. Led by second-year head coach Dick Boyle, San Francisco State compiled a record of 3–5 and was outscored by its opponents 139 to 73. The team played home games at Roberts Field in San Francisco. Although the "Gator" was voted to be the mascot for the team in 1931, local newspaper articles called the team the "Staters" from 1935 through 1940.

San Francisco State was ranked at No. 529 (out of 697 college football teams) in the final rankings under the Litkenhous Difference by Score system for 1940.

== Schedule ==
Date	Opponent	Site	Result	Attendance	Source
September 13	Moffett Field Air Corps (Note: Naval Air Station Moffett Field was a Naval Air Station from 1933 to 1994.)	Roberts Field; San Francisco, CA	W 20–0	6,000	
September 21	at Nevada	Mackay Stadium (Note: This stadium is the predecessor to the current Mackay Stadium, which was opened for the 1966 season.); Reno, NV	L 0–47		
September 27	San Francisco Junior College	Roberts Field; San Francisco, CA	L 13–19		
October 5	at Cal Aggies	A Street field; Davis, CA	L 0–35		
October 11	Humboldt State	Roberts Field; San Francisco, CA	W 3–0	2,000	
October 19	at Chico State	Chico High School Stadium; Chico, CA	L 0–12		
October 25	Cal Poly	Roberts Field; San Francisco, CA	L 13–20		
November 1	La Verne	Roberts Field; San Francisco, CA	W 24–6		
