= 1939 Santa Barbara State Gauchos football team =

American college football season

1939 Santa Barbara State Gauchos football
- Conference: California Collegiate Athletic Association
- Record: 5–4–1 (1–2 CCAA)
- Head coach: Spud Harder (6th season)
- Home stadium: La Playa Stadium

1939 California Collegiate Athletic Association football standings
	Conf.					Overall
Team	W		L		T	W		L		T
San Jose State $	3	–	0	–	0	13	–	0	–	0
Fresno State	1	–	1	–	0	10	–	1	–	0
Santa Barbara State	1	–	2	–	0	5	–	4	–	1
San Diego State	0	–	2	–	0	2	–	7	–	0
$ – Conference champion

The 1939 UC Santa Barbara Gauchos football team represented Santa Barbara State (Note: University of California, Santa Barbara was known as Santa Barbara State College from 1921 to 1943.) during the 1939 college football season.

Santa Barbara was ranked at No. 120 (out of 609 teams) in the final Litkenhous Ratings for 1939.

1939 was the inaugural year for the California Collegiate Athletic Association (CCAA). Santa Barbara State was one of four charter members of the conference, along with Fresno State Normal School, San Diego State College and San Jose State College. The Gauchos were led by sixth-year head coach Theodore "Spud" Harder and played home games at La Playa Stadium in Santa Barbara, California. They finished the season with a record of five wins, four losses and one tie (5–4–1, 1–2 CCAA).

== Schedule ==
Date	Opponent	Site	Result	Attendance	Source
September 22	Occidental*	La Playa Stadium; Santa Barbara, CA	W 20–0		
September 29	Willamette*	La Playa Stadium; Santa Barbara, CA	W 20–14		
October 6	Fresno State	La Playa Stadium; Santa Barbara, CA	L 6–13		
October 14	San Diego Marines*	La Playa Stadium; Santa Barbara, CA	L 0–7		
October 21	San Francisco*	La Playa Stadium; Santa Barbara, CA	T 0–0		
October 27	at San Jose State	Spartan Stadium; San Jose, CA	L 7–23		
November 3	at California JV*	La Playa Stadium; Santa Barbara, CA	W 22–0		
November 17	Colorado State–Greeley*	La Playa Stadium; Santa Barbara, CA	W 19–0		
November 25	at San Diego State	Aztec Bowl; San Diego, CA	W 19–0	4,000	
December 1	at Whittier*	Hadley Field; Whittier, CA	L 0–10	4,000	
*Non-conference game
