= Cecil A. Cushman =

American sports coach (1890–1959)

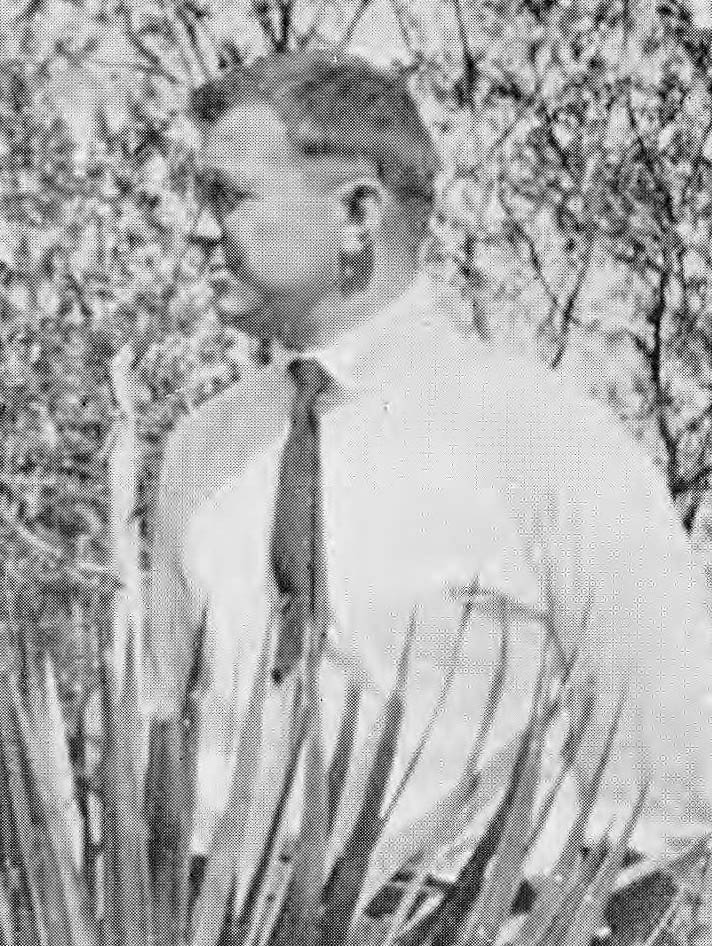
- Cushman in 1921

Biographical details
- Born: December 15, 1890; Greenville, Texas, U.S.
- Died: November 3, 1959 (aged 68); Redlands, California, U.S.
- Education: Pittsburg State (1914)

Playing career

Football
- 1912: Texas A&M
- Position: Center

Coaching career (HC unless noted)

Football
- 1920: East Texas State
- 1921–1922: Simpson (IA)
- 1923–1924: Redlands
- 1933–1952: Redlands

Basketball
- 1920–1921: East Texas State
- 1921–1923: Simpson (IA)
- 1923–1926: Redlands

Baseball
- 1921–1922: Simpson (IA)

Head coaching record
- Overall: 90–99–15 (football); 39–46 (basketball); 5–11 (baseball)
- Bowls: 0–1

Accomplishments and honors

Championships
- Football; 6 SCIAC (1933, 1940, 1945–1947, 1950)

Cecil Alonzo Cushman (December 15, 1890 – November 3, 1959) was an American football, basketball and baseball coach. He served as the head football coach at East Texas State Normal School—now known as East Texas A&M University—in 1920, Simpson College in Indianola, Iowa from 1921 to 1922, and the University of Redlands in Redlands, California from 1923 to 1925 and against from 1933 to 1952, compiling career college football coaching record of 90–99–15. Cushman was the head basketball coach at East Texas State in 1920–21, Simpson from 1921 to 1923, and Redlands from 1923 to 1926, amassing a career college basketball mark of 39–46. He was recognized as the inventor of the "kicking toe," a special shoe designed to aid "straight-toe" style placekickers in football. Cushman played attended Texas A&M University and was a member of the 1912 Texas A&M Aggies football team.

== Head coaching record ==
=== Football ===
Year	Team	Overall	Conference	Standing	Bowl/playoffs
East Texas State Lions (Independent) (1920)
1920	East Texas State	2–5–1			
East Texas State:		2–5–1			
Simpson Red and Gold (Independent) (1921–1922)
1921	Simpson	2–5			
1922	Simpson	4–3–1			
Simpson:		6–8–1			
Redlands Bulldogs (Southern California Conference) (1923–1924)
1923	Redlands	4–5–1	2–3	T–4th	
1924	Redlands	1–5–2	1–3–1	4th	
Redlands Bulldogs (Southern California Conference / Southern California Intercollegiate Athletic Conference) (1933–1952)
1933	Redlands	7–1–1	6–0–1	1st	
1934	Redlands	3–4–1	2–3	4th	
1935	Redlands	8–1–1	3–1–1	2nd	
1936	Redlands	2–6	2–3	4th	
1937	Redlands	3–3–2	2–1–2	3rd	
1938	Redlands	3–5	2–3	4th	
1939	Redlands	3–7	2–2	T–3rd	
1940	Redlands	4–4–1	3–0–1	1st	
1941	Redlands	3–3–1	2–1–1	3rd	
1942	Redlands	4–4	0–3	4th	
1943	Redlands	3–5	NA	NA	
1944	Redlands	2–5	1–1		
1945	Redlands	5–0	4–0	1st	
1946	Redlands	4–2–2	2–0–2	1st	
1947	Redlands	6–3	4–0	1st	L Pineapple
1948	Redlands	3–5	1–3	4th	
1949	Redlands	4–3–1	2–2	3rd	
1950	Redlands	5–3	3–1	T–1st	
1951	Redlands	3–5	2–2	T–2nd	
1952	Redlands	2–7	1–3	4th	
Redlands:		82–86–13	47–35–9		
Total:		90–99–15			
National championship Conference title Conference division title or championship game berth
