= 1940 Portland Pilots football team =

American college football season

1940 Portland Pilots football
- Conference: Independent
- Record: 2–3–1
- Head coach: Robert L. Mathews (4th season)
- Home stadium: Multnomah Stadium

1940 Western college football independents records
	Conf.			Overall
Team	W	L	T	W		L		T
No. 11 Santa Clara		–		6	–	1	–	1
Cal Poly		–		6	–	3	–	0
Saint Mary's		–		5	–	3	–	0
Gonzaga		–		5	–	4	–	1
Nevada		–		4	–	4	–	1
Humboldt State		–		3	–	4	–	0
Idaho Southern Branch		–		3	–	5	–	0
San Francisco State		–		3	–	5	–	0
Loyola (CA)		–		3	–	7	–	0
Portland		–		2	–	3	–	1
Hawaii		–		2	–	5	–	0
San Francisco		–		1	–	6	–	1
La Verne		–		0	–	6	–	0
Rankings from AP Poll

The 1940 Portland Pilots football team was an American football team that represented the University of Portland as an independent during the 1940 college football season. In its fourth year under head coach Robert L. Mathews, the team compiled a 2–3–1 record.

Portland was ranked at No. 154 (out of 697 college football teams) in the final rankings under the Litkenhous Difference by Score system for 1940.

The team played its home games at Multnomah Stadium in Portland, Oregon.

== Schedule ==
Date	Opponent	Site	Result	Attendance	Source
September 28	Willamette	Multnomah Stadium; Portland, OR	W 21–7		
October 5	Pacific (OR)	Multnomah Stadium; Portland, OR	W 25–7		
October 11	at Oregon State	Bell Field; Corvallis, OR	L 0–26	6,000	
October 19	Gonzaga	Multnomah Stadium; Portland, OR	L 0–20	6,000	
November 3	Saint Mary's	Multnomah Stadium; Portland, OR	L 13–25	9,000	
November 23	Montana	Multnomah Stadium; Portland, OR	T 0–0	2,500	
