= 1940 Santa Barbara State Gauchos football team =

American college football season

1940 Santa Barbara State Gauchos football
- Conference: California Collegiate Athletic Association
- Record: 5–5 (0–3 CCAA)
- Head coach: Spud Harder (7th season)
- Home stadium: La Playa Stadium

1940 California Collegiate Athletic Association football standings
	Conf.					Overall
Team	W		L		T	W		L		T
San Jose State $	3	–	0	–	0	11	–	1	–	0
Fresno State	1	–	1	–	1	9	–	2	–	1
San Diego State	1	–	1	–	1	5	–	3	–	1
Santa Barbara State	0	–	3	–	0	5	–	5	–	0
$ – Conference champion

The 1940 UC Santa Barbara Gauchos football team represented Santa Barbara State College—now known as the University of California, Santa Barbara as a member of the California Collegiate Athletic Association (CCAA) during the 1940 college football season. Led by Spud Harder in his seventh and final season as head coach, Santa Barbara State compiled an overall record of 5–5 with a mark of 0–3 in conference play, placing last out of four teams in the CCAA.

Santa Barbara was ranked at No. 235 (out of 697 college football teams) in the final rankings under the Litkenhous Difference by Score system for 1940.

The Gauchos played home games at La Playa Stadium in Santa Barbara, California.

== Schedule ==
Date	Opponent	Site	Result	Attendance	Source
September 20	Pomona*	La Playa Stadium; Santa Barbara, CA	W 19–0		
September 28	Occidental*	La Playa Stadium; Santa Barbara, CA	W 27–13		
October 5	at Fresno State	Ratcliffe Stadium; Fresno, CA	L 0–20	7,596	
October 11	Cal Poly*	La Playa Stadium; Santa Barbara, CA	W 18–14		
October 19	California JV*	La Playa Stadium; Santa Barbara, CA	W 7–6		
October 25	San Jose State	La Playa Stadium; Santa Barbara, CA	L 6–33		
November 2	at San Diego Marines (Note: The Marine Corps Recruit Depot (MCRD) in San Diego fielded a team that played against colleges and other military teams from 1922 to 1964.)*	Balboa Stadium; San Diego, CA	L 0–19		
November 9	Cal Aggies*	A Street field; Davis, CA	L 6–14		
November 15	La Verne*	La Playa Stadium; Santa Barbara, CA	W 14–0		
November 23	San Diego State	La Playa Stadium; Santa Barbara, CA	L 7–9	4,000	
*Non-conference game
