= 1940 Cal Poly Mustangs football team =

American college football season

1940 Cal Poly Mustangs football
- Conference: Independent
- Record: 6–3
- Head coach: Howie O'Daniels (8th season)
- Home stadium: Mustang Stadium

1940 Western college football independents records
	Conf.			Overall
Team	W	L	T	W		L		T
No. 11 Santa Clara		–		6	–	1	–	1
Cal Poly		–		6	–	3	–	0
Saint Mary's		–		5	–	3	–	0
Gonzaga		–		5	–	4	–	1
Nevada		–		4	–	4	–	1
Humboldt State		–		3	–	4	–	0
Idaho Southern Branch		–		3	–	5	–	0
San Francisco State		–		3	–	5	–	0
Loyola (CA)		–		3	–	7	–	0
Portland		–		2	–	3	–	1
Hawaii		–		2	–	5	–	0
San Francisco		–		1	–	6	–	1
La Verne		–		0	–	6	–	0
Rankings from AP Poll

The 1940 Cal Poly Mustangs football team represented California Polytechnic School—now known as California Polytechnic State University, San Luis Obispo—as an independent during the 1940 college football season. Led by eighth-year head coach Howie O'Daniels, Cal Poly compiled a record of 6–3. The team outscored its opponents 148 to 83 for the season.

Cal Poly was ranked at No. 391 (out of 697 college football teams) in the final rankings under the Litkenhous Difference by Score system for 1940.

The Mustangs played home games at Mustang Stadium in San Luis Obispo, California.

Cal Poly was a two-year school until 1941 and competed as an independent from 1929 to 1945.

== Schedule ==
Date	Time	Opponent	Site	Result	Attendance	Source
September 20		Caltech	Mustang Stadium; San Luis Obispo, CA	L 7–12		
September 27		Santa Maria	Mustang Stadium; San Luis Obispo, CA	W 34–0		
October 5		at Humboldt State	Albee Stadium; Eureka, CA	L 12–13		
October 11		at Santa Barbara State	La Playa Stadium; Santa Barbara, CA	L 14–18		
October 19		at La Verne	La Verne, CA	W 13–7		
October 25		at San Francisco State	Roberts Field; San Francisco, CA	W 20–13		
November 1		Chico State	Mustang Stadium; San Luis Obispo, CA	W 20–7		
November 9	8:00 p.m.	at Sacramento	Sacramento Stadium; Sacramento, CA	W 8–6	2,000	
November 16		Cal Aggies	Mustang Stadium; San Luis Obispo, CA	W 20–7		
