= 1940 Hawaii Rainbows football team =

American college football season

1940 Hawaii Rainbows football

Pineapple Bowl, L 0–3 vs. Fresno State
- Conference: Independent
- Record: 2–5
- Head coach: Eugene Gill (1st season)
- Home stadium: Honolulu Stadium

1940 Western college football independents records
	Conf.			Overall
Team	W	L	T	W		L		T
No. 11 Santa Clara		–		6	–	1	–	1
Cal Poly		–		6	–	3	–	0
Saint Mary's		–		5	–	3	–	0
Gonzaga		–		5	–	4	–	1
Nevada		–		4	–	4	–	1
Humboldt State		–		3	–	4	–	0
Idaho Southern Branch		–		3	–	5	–	0
San Francisco State		–		3	–	5	–	0
Loyola (CA)		–		3	–	7	–	0
Portland		–		2	–	3	–	1
Hawaii		–		2	–	5	–	0
San Francisco		–		1	–	6	–	1
La Verne		–		0	–	6	–	0
Rankings from AP Poll

The 1940 Hawaii Rainbows football team represented the University of Hawaiʻi (now known as the University of Hawaiʻi at Mānoa) as an independent during the 1940 college football season. Led by first-year head coach Eugene Gill, the Rainbows compiled an overall record of 2–5.

== Schedule ==
Date	Opponent	Site	Result	Attendance	Source
October 18	Hawaiian Polar Bears	Honolulu Stadium; Honolulu, Territory of Hawaii	L 28–35	15,000	
October 25	Healani	Honolulu Stadium; Honolulu, Territory of Hawaii	L 13–28	12,000	
November 1	Hawaiian Polar Bears	Honolulu Stadium; Honolulu, Territory of Hawaii	W 21–20		
November 15	Healani	Honolulu Stadium; Honolulu, Territory of Hawaii	L 4–25	7,000	
December 7	San Diego State	Honolulu Stadium; Honolulu, Territory of Hawaii	W 33–7	22,000	
December 14	Denver	Honolulu Stadium; Honolulu, Territory of Hawaii	L 16–19	22,000	
January 1	Fresno State	Honolulu Stadium; Honolulu, Territory of Hawaii (Pineapple Bowl, rivalry)	L 0–3	22,000	
