= 1940 Idaho Southern Branch Bengals football team =

American college football season

1940 Idaho Southern Branch Bengals football
- Conference: Independent
- Record: 3–5
- Head coach: Guy Wicks (6th season)
- Captain: Jim Erley (Note: Erley became a pharmacist in Coeur d'Alene, Idaho.)
- Home stadium: Spud Bowl

1940 Western college football independents records
	Conf.			Overall
Team	W	L	T	W		L		T
No. 11 Santa Clara		–		6	–	1	–	1
Cal Poly		–		6	–	3	–	0
Saint Mary's		–		5	–	3	–	0
Gonzaga		–		5	–	4	–	1
Nevada		–		4	–	4	–	1
Humboldt State		–		3	–	4	–	0
Idaho Southern Branch		–		3	–	5	–	0
San Francisco State		–		3	–	5	–	0
Loyola (CA)		–		3	–	7	–	0
Portland		–		2	–	3	–	1
Hawaii		–		2	–	5	–	0
San Francisco		–		1	–	6	–	1
La Verne		–		0	–	6	–	0
Rankings from AP Poll

The 1940 Idaho Southern Branch Bengals football team was an American football team that represented the University of Idaho, Southern Branch (later renamed Idaho State University) as an independent during the 1940 college football season. In their sixth and final season under head coach Guy Wicks, the team compiled a 3–5 record and were outscored by their opponents by a total of 185 to 96.

Idaho Southern was ranked at No. 498 (out of 697 college football teams) in the final rankings under the Litkenhous Difference by Score system for 1940.

== Schedule ==
Date	Opponent	Site	Result	Attendance	Source
September 28	Western State (CO)	baseball park (Note: The September 28 contest was a night game played at "the Pocatello baseball park".); Pocatello, ID	W 7–0	1,000+	
October 4	at Colorado State–Greeley (Note: Colorado State–Greeley is listed in some sources as Northern Colorado, a name adopted in 1970.)	Greeley, CO	L 7–21		
October 12	at Nevada	Mackay Stadium; Reno, NV	L 0–62		
October 18	at College of Idaho	Caldwell, ID	W 19–13		
October 25	Albion Normal (Note: Albion Normal is listed in some sources as Southern Idaho, a name adopted in 1947.)	Spud Bowl; Pocatello, ID	W 30–26 (Note: The 1941 Wickiup college yearbook listed the Albion score as 31–26.)		
November 2	at Weber	Ogden, UT	L 19–27	800	
November 11	Montana State^{†}	Spud Bowl; Pocatello, ID	L 7–15		
November 22	at Compton	Ramsaur Field; Compton, CA	L 7–21	4,000	
^{†}Homecoming
