= 1940 Nevada Wolf Pack football team =

American college football season

1940 Nevada Wolf Pack football
- Conference: Independent
- Record: 4–4–1
- Head coach: Jim Aiken (2nd season)
- Home stadium: Mackay Field

1940 Western college football independents records
	Conf.			Overall
Team	W	L	T	W		L		T
No. 11 Santa Clara		–		6	–	1	–	1
Cal Poly		–		6	–	3	–	0
Saint Mary's		–		5	–	3	–	0
Gonzaga		–		5	–	4	–	1
Nevada		–		4	–	4	–	1
Humboldt State		–		3	–	4	–	0
Idaho Southern Branch		–		3	–	5	–	0
San Francisco State		–		3	–	5	–	0
Loyola (CA)		–		3	–	7	–	0
Portland		–		2	–	3	–	1
Hawaii		–		2	–	5	–	0
San Francisco		–		1	–	6	–	1
La Verne		–		0	–	6	–	0
Rankings from AP Poll

The 1940 Nevada Wolf Pack football team was an American football team that represented the University of Nevada as an independent during the 1940 college football season. In their second season under head coach Jim Aiken, the team compiled a 4–4–1 record.

Nevada was ranked at No. 141 (out of 697 college football teams) in the final rankings under the Litkenhous Difference by Score system for 1940.

== Schedule ==
Date	Opponent	Site	Result	Attendance	Source
September 21	San Francisco State	Mackay Field; Reno, NV	W 47–0		
September 27	at BYU	BYU Stadium; Provo, UT	T 6–6		
October 12	Idaho Southern Branch	Mackay Field; Reno, NV	W 62–0		
October 19	Arkansas State	Mackay Field; Reno, NV	W 78–0		
October 26	Eastern New Mexico	Mackay Field; Reno, NV	W 47–6		
November 2	at Fresno State	Ratcliffe Stadium; Fresno, CA	L 6–7	5,732	
November 16	at Idaho	Neale Stadium; Moscow, ID	L 0–6	2,500	
November 21	Pacific (CA)	Mackay Field; Reno, NV	L 6–24		
November 29	at San Jose State	Spartan Stadium; San Jose, CA	L 7–30		
