= 1940 Gonzaga Bulldogs football team =

American college football season

1940 Gonzaga Bulldogs football
- Conference: Independent
- Record: 5–4–1
- Head coach: Puggy Hunton (2nd season)
- Home stadium: Gonzaga Stadium

1940 Western college football independents records
	Conf.			Overall
Team	W	L	T	W		L		T
No. 11 Santa Clara		–		6	–	1	–	1
Cal Poly		–		6	–	3	–	0
Saint Mary's		–		5	–	3	–	0
Gonzaga		–		5	–	4	–	1
Nevada		–		4	–	4	–	1
Humboldt State		–		3	–	4	–	0
Idaho Southern Branch		–		3	–	5	–	0
San Francisco State		–		3	–	5	–	0
Loyola (CA)		–		3	–	7	–	0
Portland		–		2	–	3	–	1
Hawaii		–		2	–	5	–	0
San Francisco		–		1	–	6	–	1
La Verne		–		0	–	6	–	0
Rankings from AP Poll

The 1940 Gonzaga Bulldogs football team was an American football team that represented Gonzaga University during the 1940 college football season. In their second year under head coach Puggy Hunton, the Bulldogs compiled a 5–4–1 record and outscored their opponents by a total of 133 to 79.

Senior halfback Tony Canadeo was the star of Gonzaga's 1940 team. He later played 11 seasons for the Green Bay Packers and was inducted in 1974 into the Pro Football Hall of Fame.

Gonzaga was ranked at No. 94 (out of 697 college football teams) in the final rankings under the Litkenhous Difference by Score system for 1940.

== Schedule ==
Date	Opponent	Site	Result	Attendance	Source
September 21	College of Idaho	Gonzaga Stadium; Spokane, WA	W 31–0	1,200	
September 28	at Saint Mary's	Kezar Stadium; San Francisco, CA	L 0–16	20,000	
October 12	at Idaho	Neale Stadium; Moscow, ID (rivalry)	W 25–0		
October 19	at Portland	Multnomah Stadium; Portland, OR	W 20–0	6,000	
October 26	at Montana	Butte High Stadium; Butte, MT	L 10–13	4,000	
November 2	vs. Willamette	Longview, WA	W 7–6		
November 9	at Arizona State	Goodwin Field; Tempe, AZ	T 7–7		
November 16	Detroit	Gonzaga Stadium; Spokane, WA	W 13–7	6,000	
November 23	Washington State	Gonzaga Stadium; Spokane, WA	L 7–14	8,000	
November 29	at Pacific Lutheran	Tacoma Stadium; Tacoma, WA	L 13–16	12,000–15,000	
