= 1940 Santa Clara Broncos football team =

American college football season

1940 Santa Clara Broncos football
- Conference: Independent

Ranking
- AP: No. 11
- Record: 6–1–1
- Head coach: Buck Shaw (5th season)
- Home stadium: Kezar Stadium

1940 Western college football independents records
	Conf.			Overall
Team	W	L	T	W		L		T
No. 11 Santa Clara		–		6	–	1	–	1
Cal Poly		–		6	–	3	–	0
Saint Mary's		–		5	–	3	–	0
Gonzaga		–		5	–	4	–	1
Nevada		–		4	–	4	–	1
Humboldt State		–		3	–	4	–	0
Idaho Southern Branch		–		3	–	5	–	0
San Francisco State		–		3	–	5	–	0
Loyola (CA)		–		3	–	7	–	0
Portland		–		2	–	3	–	1
Hawaii		–		2	–	5	–	0
San Francisco		–		1	–	6	–	1
La Verne		–		0	–	6	–	0
Rankings from AP Poll

The 1940 Santa Clara Broncos football team represented Santa Clara University as an independent during the 1940 college football season. In its fifth season under head coach Buck Shaw, the team compiled a 6–1–1 record, outscored opponents by a total of 155 to 46, and was ranked No. 11 in the final AP poll.

== Schedule ==
Date	Opponent	Rank	Site	Result	Attendance	Source
September 28	Utah		Kezar Stadium; San Francisco, CA	W 34–13	40,000	
October 4	at UCLA		Los Angeles Memorial Coliseum; Los Angeles, CA	W 9–6	45,000	
October 12	at Stanford		Stanford Stadium; Stanford, CA	L 6–7	54,999	
October 26	at Michigan State		Macklin Field; East Lansing, MI	T 0–0	18,500	
November 3	San Francisco	No. 19	Kezar Stadium; San Francisco, CA	W 27–0		
November 17	Saint Mary's	No. 19	Kezar Stadium; San Francisco, CA	W 19–7	40,000	
November 24	Loyola (CA)	No. 16	Kezar Stadium; San Francisco, CA	W 27–0	10,000	
November 30	Oklahoma	No. 15	Kezar Stadium; San Francisco, CA	W 33–13	5,000	
Rankings from AP Poll released prior to the game

== Rankings ==
Ranking movements Legend: ██ Increase in ranking ██ Decrease in ranking — = Not ranked т = Tied with team above or below
	Week							
Poll	1	2	3	4	5	6	7	Final
AP	—	—	20т	19т	16	19	15	11

== After the season ==
=== NFL draft ===
The following Bronco was selected in the 1941 NFL draft following the season.

Round	Pick	Player	Position	NFL team
13	119	Jim Johnson	Back	Chicago Bears

Johnson played in the January 1941 edition of the East–West Shrine Game, as it was then known; in 2025, he was named to the All-Century Team of the East–West Shrine Bowl. Johnson died in an airplane crash in Germany in May 1945 while serving in the U.S. Ninth Army. He was inducted to the Broncos' athletic hall of fame in 1975.
