= 1940 San Francisco Dons football team =

American college football season

1940 San Francisco Dons football
- Conference: Independent
- Record: 1–6–1
- Head coach: George Malley (4th season)
- Home stadium: Kezar Stadium

1940 Western college football independents records
	Conf.			Overall
Team	W	L	T	W		L		T
No. 11 Santa Clara		–		6	–	1	–	1
Cal Poly		–		6	–	3	–	0
Saint Mary's		–		5	–	3	–	0
Gonzaga		–		5	–	4	–	1
Nevada		–		4	–	4	–	1
Humboldt State		–		3	–	4	–	0
Idaho Southern Branch		–		3	–	5	–	0
San Francisco State		–		3	–	5	–	0
Loyola (CA)		–		3	–	7	–	0
Portland		–		2	–	3	–	1
Hawaii		–		2	–	5	–	0
San Francisco		–		1	–	6	–	1
La Verne		–		0	–	6	–	0
Rankings from AP Poll

The 1940 San Francisco Dons football team was an American football team that represented the University of San Francisco as an independent during the 1940 college football season. In their fourth and final season under head coach George Malley, the Dons compiled a 1–6–1 record and were outscored by their opponents by a combined total of 125 to 73.

San Francisco was ranked at No. 89 (out of 697 college football teams) in the final rankings under the Litkenhous Difference by Score system for 1940.

== Schedule ==
Date	Opponent	Site	Result	Attendance	Source
September 28	Stanford	Kezar Stadium; San Francisco, CA	L 0–27	25,000	
October 13	at Saint Mary's	Kezar Stadium; San Francisco, CA	L 7–13	16,000	
October 18	San Jose State	Seals Stadium; San Francisco, CA	L 6–7	6,000	
October 27	Creighton	Kezar Stadium; San Francisco, CA	T 0–0	10,000	
November 3	at No. 19 Santa Clara	Kezar Stadium; San Francisco, CA	L 0–27		
November 23	at Hardin–Simmons	Abilene, TX	L 18–28	6,000	
December 1	at Loyola (CA)	Gilmore Stadium; Los Angeles, CA	W 21–0	7,000	
December 7	No. 18 Texas Tech	Kezar Stadium; San Francisco, CA	L 21–23	< 2,500	
Rankings from AP Poll released prior to the game
