= 1940 Loyola Lions football team =

American college football season

1940 Loyola Lions football
- Conference: Independent
- Record: 3–7
- Head coach: Marty Brill (1st season)
- Home stadium: Gilmore Stadium; Los Angeles Memorial Coliseum

1940 Western college football independents records
	Conf.			Overall
Team	W	L	T	W		L		T
No. 11 Santa Clara		–		6	–	1	–	1
Cal Poly		–		6	–	3	–	0
Saint Mary's		–		5	–	3	–	0
Gonzaga		–		5	–	4	–	1
Nevada		–		4	–	4	–	1
Humboldt State		–		3	–	4	–	0
Idaho Southern Branch		–		3	–	5	–	0
San Francisco State		–		3	–	5	–	0
Loyola (CA)		–		3	–	7	–	0
Portland		–		2	–	3	–	1
Hawaii		–		2	–	5	–	0
San Francisco		–		1	–	6	–	1
La Verne		–		0	–	6	–	0
Rankings from AP Poll

The 1940 Loyola Lions football team was an American football team that represented Loyola University of Los Angeles (now known as Loyola Marymount University) as an independent during the 1940 college football season. In their first season under head coach Marty Brill, the Lions compiled a 3–7 record.

Loyola was ranked at No. 135 (out of 697 college football teams) in the final rankings under the Litkenhous Difference by Score system for 1940.

== Schedule ==
Date	Opponent	Site	Result	Attendance	Source
September 20	Redlands	Gilmore Stadium; Los Angeles, CA	W 13–0	12,000	
October 5	at Texas Tech	Tech Field; Lubbock, TX	L 0–19	9,000	
October 11	Whittier	Gilmore Stadium; Los Angeles, CA	W 18–0	10,000	
October 20	Saint Mary's	Los Angeles Memorial Coliseum; Los Angeles, CA	L 7–18	10,000	
October 26	Pacific (CA)	Gilmore Stadium; Los Angeles, CA	W 20–0	4,000	
November 1	San Jose State	Gilmore Stadium; Los Angeles, CA	L 12–27	10,000	
November 8	Hardin–Simmons	Gilmore Stadium; Los Angeles, CA	L 6–40	10,000	
November 15	Arizona	Gilmore Stadium; Los Angeles, CA	L 13–20	8,000	
November 24	at No. 16 Santa Clara	Kezar Stadium; San Francisco, CA	L 0–27	10,000	
December 1	San Francisco	Gilmore Stadium; Los Angeles, CA	L 0–21	7,000	
Rankings from Coaches' Poll released prior to the game
