= Earl J. Merritt =

American athletics coach (1896–1986)

Biographical details
- Born: August 9, 1896; Duluth, Minnesota, U.S.
- Died: July 7, 1986 (aged 89); La Verne, California, U.S.

Playing career

Football
- 1923–1924: Pomona

Basketball
- c. 1924: Pomona

Baseball
- c. 1924: Pomona

Track
- c. 1924: Pomona
- Positions: Quarterback (football); Center fielder (baseball)

Coaching career (HC unless noted)

Football
- 1925–1934: Pomona (freshmen)
- 1935–1958: Pomona/Pomona-Claremont

Head coaching record
- Overall: 93–67–13

Accomplishments and honors

Championships
- 6 SCC/SCIAC (1938, 1942, 1950, 1953–1955)

Earl Jay "Fuzz" Merritt (August 9, 1896 – July 7, 1986) was an American football, basketball, and baseball coach. He served as the head football coach at Pomona College in Claremont, California, from 1935 to 1958, compiling a record of 93–67–13. Merritt also coached basketball and baseball at Pomona.

== Early life and education ==
Merritt attended Pomona, where he lettered in football, basketball, baseball, and track. He played quarterback on the football team and as a center fielder on the baseball team. In track, he participated in the hammer throw, discus throw, and pole vault.

== Coaching career ==
Following his graduation in 1925, Merritt joined Pomona's coaching staff. He coached the freshman football team for ten seasons before succeeding Eugene W. Nixon as head coach of the varsity football team in 1935.

== Death and legacy ==
In December 1960, Merrit was elected to the National Association of Intercollegiate Athletics Hall of Fame. He died on July 7, 1986. The football field of the Pomona-Pitzer Sagehens was renamed Merritt Field in his honor in 1991.

== Head coaching record ==
Year	Team	Overall	Conference	Standing	Bowl/playoffs
Pomona Sagehens (Independent) (1935–1937)
1935	Pomona	5–2–1			
1936	Pomona	6–4			
1937	Pomona	6–2–1			
Pomona/Pomona-Claremont Sagehens (Southern California Conference / Southern California Intercollegiate Athletic Conference) (1938–1958)
1938	Pomona	6–0–1	4–0–1	1st	
1939	Pomona	4–3–1	2–1–1	2nd	
1940	Pomona	4–4	3–1	2nd	
1941	Pomona	2–5	0–4	5th	
1942	Pomona	3–3–1	2–1	T–1st	
1943	Pomona	2–3–2			
1944	No team—World War II				
1945	No team—World War II				
1946	Pomona	1–5–2	1–1–2	3rd	
1947	Pomona	3–3–1	1–2–1	T–3rd	
1948	Pomona	6–2	3–1	2nd	
1949	Pomona	6–2	3–1	2nd	
1950	Pomona	4–3–1	3–1	T–1st	
1951	Pomona	1–7	1–3	T–4th	
1952	Pomona	2–5	2–2	3rd	
1953	Pomona-Claremont	7–1	3–1	T–1st	
1954	Pomona-Claremont	8–0	4–0	1st	
1955	Pomona-Claremont	7–1	4–0	1st	
1956	Pomona-Claremont	4–3–1	2–1–1	T–2nd	
1957	Pomona-Claremont	3–4	2–1	2nd	
1958	Pomona	3–5–1	1–3	4th	
Pomona / Pomona-Claremont:		93–67–13			
Total:		93–67–13			
National championship Conference title Conference division title or championship game berth

== See also ==
- List of Pomona College people
