= 1940 Saint Mary's Gaels football team =

American college football season

1940 Saint Mary's Gaels football
- Conference: Independent
- Record: 5–3
- Head coach: Red Strader (1st season)
- Home stadium: Kezar Stadium

1940 Western college football independents records
	Conf.			Overall
Team	W	L	T	W		L		T
No. 11 Santa Clara		–		6	–	1	–	1
Cal Poly		–		6	–	3	–	0
Saint Mary's		–		5	–	3	–	0
Gonzaga		–		5	–	4	–	1
Nevada		–		4	–	4	–	1
Humboldt State		–		3	–	4	–	0
Idaho Southern Branch		–		3	–	5	–	0
San Francisco State		–		3	–	5	–	0
Loyola (CA)		–		3	–	7	–	0
Portland		–		2	–	3	–	1
Hawaii		–		2	–	5	–	0
San Francisco		–		1	–	6	–	1
La Verne		–		0	–	6	–	0
Rankings from AP Poll

The 1940 Saint Mary's Gaels football team was an American football team that represented Saint Mary's College of California during the 1940 college football season. In their first season under head coach Red Strader, the Gaels compiled a 5–3 record and outscored their opponents by a combined total of 100 to 68.

Saint Mary's was ranked at No. 49 (out of 697 college football teams) in the final rankings under the Litkenhous Difference by Score system for 1940.

== Schedule ==
Date	Opponent	Site	Result	Attendance	Source
September 28	Gonzaga	Kezar Stadium; San Francisco CA	W 16–0	20,000	
October 5	at California	California Memorial Stadium; Berkeley, CA	L 6–9	50,000	
October 13	vs. San Francisco	Kezar Stadium; San Francisco, CA	W 13–7	16,000	
October 20	at Loyola (CA)	Los Angeles Memorial Coliseum; Los Angeles, CA	W 18–7	10,000	
October 26	at No. 11 Fordham	Polo Grounds; New York, NY	W 9–6	34,500	
November 3	at Portland	Multnomah Field; Portland, OR	W 25–13	9,000	
November 10	Duquesne	Kezar Stadium; San Francisco, CA	L 6–7	12,000	
November 17	vs. No. 19 Santa Clara	Kezar Stadium; San Francisco, CA	L 7–19	40,000	
Rankings from AP Poll released prior to the game
