= Occidental–Whittier football rivalry =

College football rivalry

- Teams: Occidental Tigers; Whittier Poets
- First meeting: 1907; Occidental 10, Whittier 0
- Latest meeting: 2019; Whittier 21, Occidental 18
- Trophy: Myron Claxton's Shoes

Statistics
- Total meetings: 111
- All-time series: Occidental leads, 57–52–2

The Occidental–Whittier football rivalry was a college football rivalry between the Occidental College Tigers and the Whittier College Poets, both members of the Southern California Intercollegiate Athletic Conference. The rivalry has been played 108 times, renewed annually since 1907, except for interruptions during the World Wars and in 2017. By 1935, the Los Angeles Times was already referring to the Tigers and Poets as "old rivals". The schools met twice in the years of 1913, 1984, and 1989, the latter two due to the SCIAC's doubling up of one opponent per season in the 1980s. The game is often referred to as the Shoes Game, as the winner maintains possession of Myron Claxton's bronzed shoes as a trophy. Over its more than 100-year history, the rivalry has been relatively even, with Oxy maintaining a 57–52–2 edge. Whittier dominated the rivalry from the 1950s through the 1970s, but Oxy has won 27 of the last 35 games since 1983. Following the abandonment of Occidental's 2017 football season, no game was played in 2017, but the series resumed in 2018. The series is on hiatus following Occidental's discontinuation of its football program amidst the coronavirus pandemic, and Whittier's discontinuation of football following the 2022 season.

== Myron Claxton's shoes ==
Prior to the 1939 game between the two schools, Occidental decided to steal the shoes of Little All-American tackle (and future Whittier mayor) Myron Claxton in an attempt to hinder his performance. Claxton played in his work boots, and Whittier went to Oxy and won 36–0. Following the game, Claxton went to the Oxy sideline and reclaimed his shoes. After the Second World War, Claxton's shoes were bronzed by Whittier College's Franklin Society and became a trophy that the winner of the game maintains possession of for a year. In anticipation of winning this trophy, both teams have been known to shout "Shoes!" as a rallying cry. The Shoes were featured on a 2013 episode of ESPN's College Gameday broadcast from the University of Southern California.

== Game results ==
Occidental victories	Whittier victories	Ties

No.	Date	Location	Winner	Score
1	1907		Occidental	10–0
2	1908		Occidental	25–6
3	1909		Whittier	35–9
4	1910		Tie	0–0
5	1911		Occidental	38–2
6	1912		Occidental	28–7
7	1913	Los Angeles	Occidental	6–0
8	1913	Whittier	Whittier	30–6
9	1914		Whittier	14–7
10	1915		Occidental	13–6
11	1916	Whittier	Tie	13–13
12	1917	Los Angeles	Occidental	32–7
13	1919		Occidental	13–0
14	1920		Whittier	21–7
15	1921		Whittier	10–6
16	1922		Occidental	27–6
17	1923		Occidental	12–3
18	1924		Occidental	13–0
19	1925		Occidental	13–0
20	1926		Occidental	27–7
21	1927		Whittier	7–0
22	1928		Occidental	19–7
23	1929		Occidental	28–0
24	1930		Occidental	25–0
25	1931		Whittier	21–0
26	1932		Occidental	20–7
27	1933		Whittier	7–6
28	1934		Whittier	12–0
29	1935	Whittier	Whittier	52–0
30	1936		Whittier	21–0
31	1937		Whittier	23–7
32	1938		Whittier	14–0
33	1939		Whittier	36–0
34	1940		Occidental	7–6
35	1941		Whittier	14–7
36	1942		Occidental	19–7
37	1946		Occidental	7–6
38	1947		Occidental	6–4
39	1948		Occidental	20–6
40	1949		Whittier	54–6
41	1950		Whittier	15–0
42	1951		Occidental	7–0
43	1952		Whittier	14–6
44	1953		Occidental	7–6
45	1954		Occidental	13–7
46	1955		Whittier	7–0
47	1956		Whittier	20–7
48	1957		Whittier	30–6
49	1958		Whittier	40–14
50	1959		Whittier	28–6
51	1960		Whittier	13–12
52	1961		Whittier	28–8
53	1962		Whittier	27–7
54	1963		Whittier	20–7
55	1964		Whittier	32–17
56	1965		Occidental	21–17

No.	Date	Location	Winner	Score
57	1966		Whittier	12–7
58	1967		Whittier	20–13
59	1968		Occidental	20–8
60	1969		Whittier	53–8
61	1970		Whittier	23–10
62	1971		Whittier	23–14
63	1972		Whittier	23–17
64	1973		Whittier	29–12
65	1974		Whittier	16–7
66	1975		Occidental	41–32
67	1976		Occidental	21–0
68	1977		Whittier	28–14
69	1978		Whittier	17–0
70	1979		Whittier	28–26
71	1980		Whittier	21–12
72	1981		Whittier	41–6
73	1982		Whittier	35–23
74	1983		Occidental	18–8
75	1984		Occidental	27–23
76	1984		Occidental	17–0
77	1985	Los Angeles	Occidental	20–7
78	1986	Whittier	Whittier	28–25
79	1987	Los Angeles	Occidental	6–0
80	1988	Whittier	Occidental	27–10
81	1989	Los Angeles	Occidental	7–0
82	1989	Whittier	Whittier	26–16
83	1990	Los Angeles	Occidental	38–13
84	1991	Whittier	Occidental	20–14
85	1992	Los Angeles	Occidental	36–34
86	1993	Whittier	Occidental	37–25
87	1994	Los Angeles	Occidental	17–13
88	1995	Whittier	Occidental	10–0
89	1996	Los Angeles	Occidental	14–10
90	1997	Whittier	Whittier	41–7
91	1998	Los Angeles	Whittier	30–14
92	1999	Whittier	Occidental	17–7
93	2000	Los Angeles	Whittier	28–27
94	2001	Whittier	Occidental	34–7
95	2002	Los Angeles	Occidental	29–20
96	2003	Whittier	Occidental	35–20
97	2004	Los Angeles	Occidental	42–13
98	2005	Whittier	Occidental	28–20
99	2006	Los Angeles	Occidental	34–30
100	2007	Whittier	Whittier	67–61
101	2008	Los Angeles	Occidental	48–14
102	2009	Whittier	Occidental	44–23
103	2010	Los Angeles	Occidental	25–22
104	2011	Whittier	Occidental	31–17
105	2012	Los Angeles	Whittier	61–30
106	2013	Whittier	Whittier	59–52
107	2014	Los Angeles	Occidental	23–17
108	2015	Whittier	Occidental	62–15
109	2016	Los Angeles	Occidental	56–38
110	2018	Los Angeles	Whittier	28–13
111	2019	Whittier	Whittier	21–18
Series: Occidental leads 57–52–2

== See also ==
- List of NCAA college football rivalry games
