= 1940 Humboldt State Lumberjacks football team =

American college football season

1940 Humboldt State Lumberjacks football
- Conference: Independent
- Record: 3–4
- Head coach: Herbert L. Hart (3rd season)
- Home stadium: Albee Stadium

1940 Western college football independents records
	Conf.			Overall
Team	W	L	T	W		L		T
No. 11 Santa Clara		–		6	–	1	–	1
Cal Poly		–		6	–	3	–	0
Saint Mary's		–		5	–	3	–	0
Gonzaga		–		5	–	4	–	1
Nevada		–		4	–	4	–	1
Humboldt State		–		3	–	4	–	0
Idaho Southern Branch		–		3	–	5	–	0
San Francisco State		–		3	–	5	–	0
Loyola (CA)		–		3	–	7	–	0
Portland		–		2	–	3	–	1
Hawaii		–		2	–	5	–	0
San Francisco		–		1	–	6	–	1
La Verne		–		0	–	6	–	0
Rankings from AP Poll

The 1940 Humboldt State Lumberjacks football team represented Humboldt State College—now known as California State Polytechnic University, Humboldt—as an independent during the 1940 college football season. Led by Herbert L. Hart in his third and final season as head coach, the Lumberjacks compiled a record of 3–4 and were outscored by their opponents 60 to 33 for the season. The team played home games at Albee Stadium in Eureka, California.

Humboldt was ranked at No. 472 (out of 697 college football teams) in the final rankings under the Litkenhous Difference by Score system for 1940.

Hart finished his three-year tenure with an overall record of 12–8 (.600).

== Schedule ==
Date	Opponent	Site	Result	Attendance	Source
September 28	Alhambra Athletic Club	Albee Stadium; Eureka, CA	W 7–6		
October 5	Cal Poly	Albee Stadium; Eureka, CA	W 13–12	2,000	
October 11	at San Francisco State	Roberts Field; San Francisco, CA	L 0–3	2,000	
October 18	Cal Aggies	Albee Stadium; Eureka, CA	L 0–20		
October 23	Arkansas A&M	Albee Stadium; Eureka, CA	W 13–0		
November 2	California JV (Note: The University of California JV team was commonly known as the "Cal Ramblers".)	Albee Stadium; Eureka, CA	L 0–12		
November 11	at Chico State	Chico High School Stadium; Chico, CA	L 0–7		
