= Occidental Tigers =

Intercollegiate sports teams of Occidental College

- University: Occidental College
- Nickname: Tigers
- NCAA: Division III
- Conference: Southern California Intercollegiate Athletic Conference
- Athletic director: Shanda Ness
- Location: Los Angeles, California
- Varsity teams: 21
- Basketball arena: Rush Gymnasium
- Baseball stadium: Anderson Field
- Lacrosse stadium: Jack Kemp Stadium/Patterson Field
- Colors: Orange and black
- Mascot: Oswald the Tiger
- Fight song: "Tiger Roar"
- Website: oxyathletics.com

Located in Los Angeles, Occidental College competes in the Southern California Intercollegiate Athletic Conference (SCIAC) at the NCAA's Division III level. Approximately 25 percent of all students play a varsity sport, and nearly half of all students participate in all athletics activities combined (including a host of club sports and intramural leagues).

== History ==
In 1889–90 Professor James Parkhill (Occidental College’s fourth president, from 1896–97) organized intramural games for interested College men and Academy boys. His enthusiastic leadership laid the groundwork for establishing the nickname (Tigers) and school colors (orange and black) after his undergraduate alma mater, Princeton. The school dropped football in 2020.

== Rivalries ==
Every year Occidental played two football games for rivalry trophies. One game was against Pomona-Pitzer and the winner awarded "The Drum." The Drum rivalry is the oldest rivalry game in Southern California, having been contested since 1895. Oxy leads Pomona-Pitzer all time in the series 65–54–3. The other game was against Whittier College and the winner awarded "The Shoes," which are a pair of bronzed cleats from a 1940 graduate from Whittier named Myron Claxton.

== Varsity sports ==
The Tigers have 10 varsity men's teams and 11 varsity women's teams.

Men's sports	Women's sports
Baseball	Basketball
Basketball	Cross country
Cross country	Golf
Golf	Lacrosse
Soccer	Soccer
Swimming	Softball
Tennis	Swimming
Track and field	Tennis
Water Polo	Track and field
	Volleyball
	Water polo

=== Men's basketball ===
For the last decade, under alumnus and winningest coach in school history Brian Newhall, the Tigers have found great success on the court. In that time span the program has compiled a 146–59 (.712) record and have won a pair of SCIAC conference championships (2006–07, 2007–08). Furthermore under Newhall, the Tigers have earned regional and national rankings, produced the only perfect 14–0 record in SCIAC history and triumphed in two NCAA playoff games to reach the NCAA III Elite 8 in 2003. Some Oxy players have pursued professional careers overseas, including four players from Oxy's 25–3 Elite 8 team, have gone overseas. One example is Oxy alumnus Blair Slattery, the all-time career scoring and rebounding leader who signed on with the Munster Basketball Club in Germany in 1993.

The program plays its games in Frank Neill Rush Gymnasium with a seating capacity of 1,800.

== Club sports ==
The college also have six club sport teams:

- Dance team
- Men's lacrosse
- Men's and women's rugby
- Men's and women's ultimate frisbee

== Facilities ==
Venue	Sport(s)	Ref.
Patterson Field	Soccer	
Patterson Field	Lacrosse	
Patterson Field	Track and field (Note: At the "Bill Henry Track".)	
Anderson Field	Baseball	
Bell Field	Softball	
McKinnon Family Center	Tennis	
De Mandel Aquatics Center	Swimming	
Upper and Lower Fields	Soccer (training)	
Alumni Gymnasium	(recreational)	

== National championships ==
Sport	Titles	Assoc.	Division	Year	Rival/runner-up	Score
Cross country (m)	1	NCAA	Division III	1977	Humboldt State	149–152
Track and field (m)	3	NAIA	Single	1956	Abilene Christian	89½–56 (+33½)
Track and field (m)	3	NAIA	Single	1957	Abilene Christian	148½–34 (+114½)
Track and field (m)	3	NAIA	Single	1958	Winston-Salem State	93–62 (+31)

== Conference championships ==
All the titles won in the SCIAC

Sport	Titles	Winning years
Football	4	2004, 2005, 2006, 2008
Cross country (m)	1	2006
Basketball (m)	2	2006–07, 2007–08
Basketball (w)	1	2007–08
Baseball	1	2016
Track and Field	34	1938, 1943, 1948, 1954, 1956, 1957, 1958, 1959, 1960, 1961, 1962, 1963, 1964, 1965, 1966, 1968, 1969, 1970, 1971, 1972, 1973, 1974, 1975, 1976, 1977, 1980, 1981, 1983, 1984, 1985, 1986, 1988, 1989, 1990
SCIAC All Sports Champions	3	1978, 1983, 1984
Soccer (m)	1	2023
