= 1939 Pittsburgh Panthers football team =

American college football season

1939 Pittsburgh Panthers football
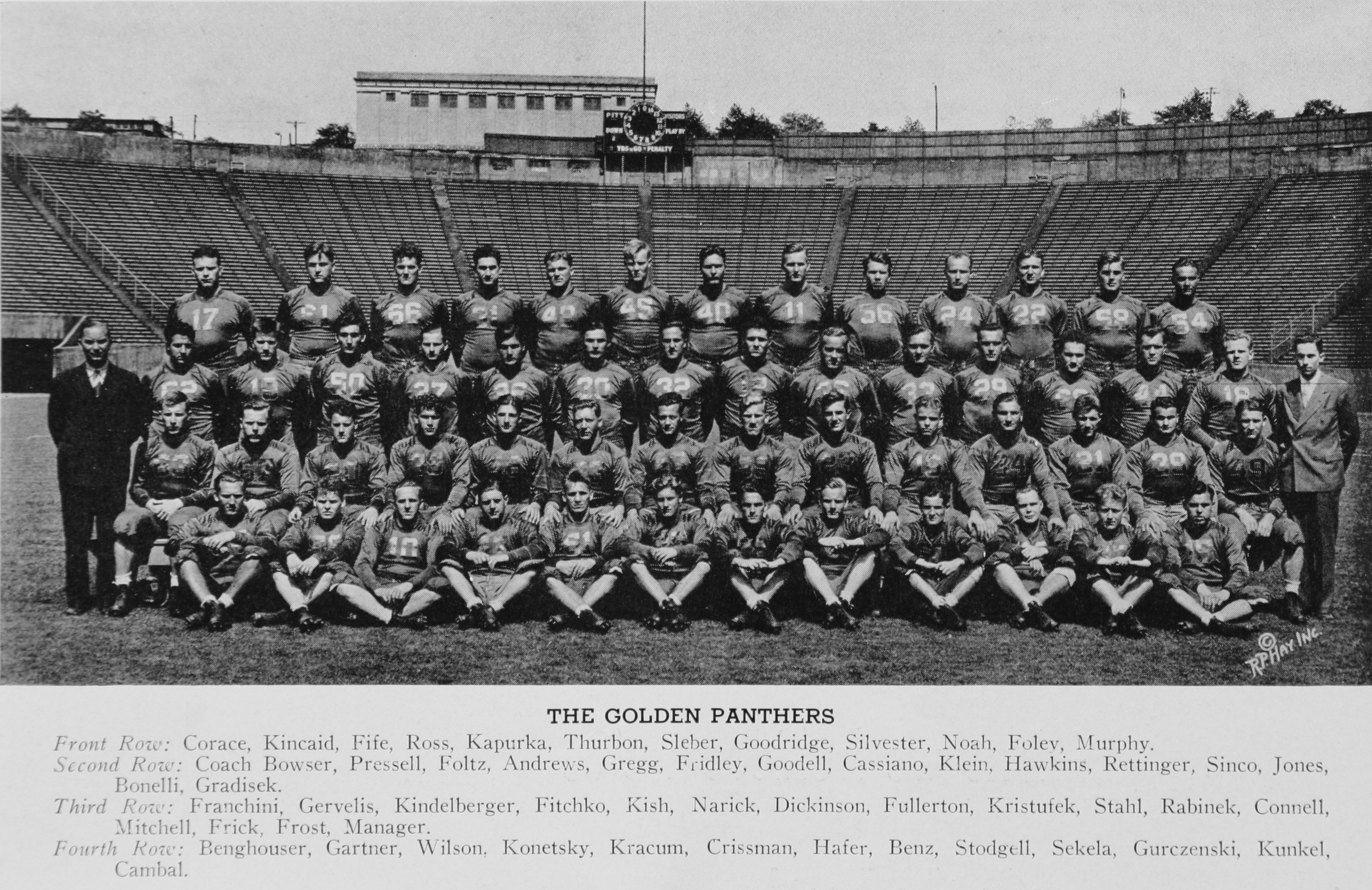
- Conference: Independent
- Record: 5–4
- Head coach: Charley Bowser (1st season)
- Home stadium: Pitt Stadium

1939 Eastern college football independents records
	Conf.			Overall
Team	W	L	T	W		L		T
No. 4 Cornell		–		8	–	0	–	0
No. 10 Duquesne		–		8	–	0	–	1
Swarthmore		–		6	–	0	–	1
Scranton		–		7	–	0	–	2
Princeton		–		7	–	1	–	0
La Salle		–		6	–	1	–	1
Penn State		–		5	–	1	–	2
No. 11 Boston College		–		9	–	2	–	0
No. 17 Fordham		–		6	–	2	–	0
Villanova		–		6	–	2	–	0
Boston University		–		5	–	3	–	0
Brown		–		5	–	3	–	1
Dartmouth		–		5	–	3	–	1
Hofstra		–		4	–	3	–	0
NYU		–		5	–	4	–	0
Pittsburgh		–		5	–	4	–	0
Harvard		–		4	–	4	–	0
Manhattan		–		4	–	4	–	0
Penn		–		4	–	4	–	0
Syracuse		–		3	–	3	–	2
Vermont		–		3	–	3	–	2
Tufts		–		3	–	4	–	1
Yale		–		3	–	4	–	1
Army		–		3	–	4	–	2
Bucknell		–		3	–	5	–	0
Carnegie Tech		–		3	–	5	–	0
Providence		–		3	–	5	–	0
Columbia		–		2	–	4	–	2
Massachusetts State		–		2	–	5	–	2
Colgate		–		2	–	5	–	1
Temple		–		2	–	7	–	0
CCNY		–		1	–	7	–	0
Buffalo		–		0	–	7	–	0
Rankings from AP Poll

The 1939 Pittsburgh Panthers football team represented the University of Pittsburgh as an independent during the 1939 college football season. Led by first-year head coach Charley Bowser, the Panthers compiled a record of 5–4.

Pittsburgh was not ranked in the final AP poll, but it was ranked at No. 24 in the 1939 Williamson System ratings, and at No. 35 in the final Litkenhous Ratings for 1939.

The team played home games at Pitt Stadium in Pittsburgh.

== Schedule ==
Date	Opponent	Rank	Site	Result	Attendance	Source
September 30	at Washington		Husky Stadium; Seattle, WA	W 27–6	25,000	
October 7	West Virginia		Pitt Stadium; Pittsburgh, PA (rivalry)	W 20–0	30,000	
October 14	Duke		Pitt Stadium; Pittsburgh, PA	W 14–13	49,000–50,000	
October 21	Duquesne	No. 1	Pitt Stadium; Pittsburgh, PA	L 13–21	23,000–25,000	
October 28	at Fordham	No. 18	Polo Grounds; New York, NY	L 13–27	36,218	
November 4	at Temple		Temple Stadium; Philadelphia, PA	W 13–7	18,000	
November 11	Carnegie Tech		Pitt Stadium; Pittsburgh, PA	W 6–0	55,000	
November 18	Nebraska		Pitt Stadium; Pittsburgh, PA	L 13–14	30,000	
November 25	at Penn State		New Beaver Field; State College, PA (rivalry)	L 0–10	20,000	
Rankings from AP Poll released prior to the game

== Rankings ==
Ranking movements Legend: ██ Increase in ranking ██ Decrease in ranking — = Not ranked ( ) = First-place votes
	Week								
Poll	1	2	3	4	5	6	7	8	Final
AP	1 (25)	18	—	—	—	—	—	—	—

== Preseason ==
Coach Sutherland attempted to give his assistants a raise, but his request was turned down by the athletic department. Harold Williams, Eddie Schultz, Mike Milligan and Alex Fox resigned. Williams and Milligan accepted coaching positions with the University of Florida. Eddie Schultz concentrated on his law practice and Alex Fox went into business full-time with the Lehigh Portland Cement Co.

In February, the athletic department agreed that the university would be a non-participating member of the Western Conference (Big Ten) and be under the jurisdiction of their Commissioner, Major John L. Griffith. He would supposedly monitor the implementation of the Code Bowman and advise the athletic department of any problems. This was set up without any input from Coach Sutherland.

In late February the athletic department posted the athletic eligibility list and most of the freshmen football players were no longer in school.

By early March, Jock Sutherland and Chancellor Bowman could not come to an agreement about de-emphasizing the schedule to balance the loss of talent brought about by the stringent athletic code. On March 4, Sutherland sent a letter of resignation to the Chancellor and ended his coaching career at Pitt. Author Harry Scott wrote that Sutherland confided to one of his closest friends: "I would be there today–as far as I am concerned– coaching whatever material I had, regardless of the size or ability, provided–and this is important–(1) that I had been treated with just ordinary courtesy and decency in a spirit of friendly co-operation, (2) that the schedules had been adjusted to the quality of the material."

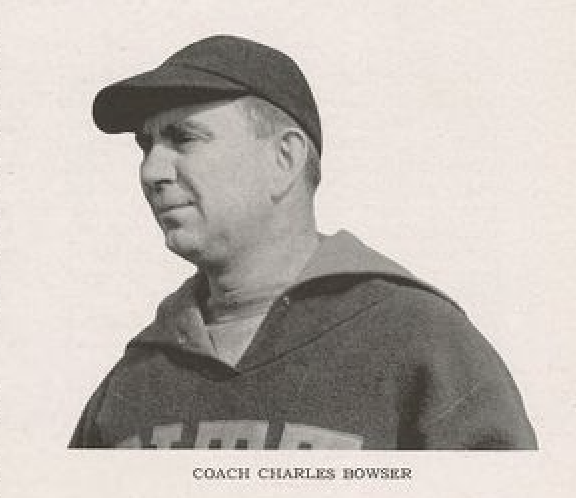
Coach Bowser

On March 20, the Board of Trustees approved the selection of Charles Bowser as the head coach of the Pitt varsity football team. He was tendered a three-year contract for $7,500 per year. Bowser was a Pitt man, having both played for Pop Warner (1919–1922) and coached twice on Jock Sutherland's staff (1927–1929, 1935–1937). The Pitt News noted that Bowser would be in a most difficult position for the 1939 season. "With a squad that has been wrecked by graduation, perforated by the Code Bowman, and demoralized by continual football squabbling, Bowser faces a terrific schedule."

By Tuesday March 28, Bowser had completed his coaching staff. He hired six former Panthers as assistants – Mike Nicksik (backfield), Dr. Arnold Greene (fullback), Bob Hoel (tackle), Albin Lezouski (guard), Nick Kliskey (center) and Bill Daddio (end). Nick Kliskey was hired full-time and given the additional duty of personnel manager. Bill Daddio was hired as a student coach to retain his amateur golf status. The other four were hired on a part-time basis. During fall practice Al Lezouski took a job at East Orange High School in New Jersey. Walt Raskowski, in medical school at Pitt, replaced him as guard coach.

Spring practice opened on March 31 and concluded on May 6, with an intra-squad game won by the Blues over the Whites 20 to 6.

As per Code Bowman, fall practice began on September 9 (three weeks prior to first game), and one week prior to the opening of school. Coach Bowser's Panthers only had one week of two-a-days and 20 total practices before their first game. The 58 candidates included only 12 lettermen.

== Coaching staff ==
1939 Pittsburgh Panthers football staff
Coaching staff: Charley Bowser – Head coach; Walter Raskowski – guard coach – freshman team coach; Michael Nicksick – backfield coach; Dr. Arnold Greene – assistant backfield coach; Nicholas Kliskey – center coach; Robert Hoel – tackle coach; Bill Daddio – end coach; Charles Shea – assistant freshman team coach	Support staff: Dr. H. A. Ralph Shanor – team physician; Elwin Dees – team trainer; Harold Whitson – varsity equipment manager; James Hagan - director of athletics; Frank Carver – publicity director; Robert Frost – varsity student manager

== Roster ==
1939 Pittsburgh Panthers football roster
Player	Position	Games	Height	Weight	Class	Prep School	Hometown
Ralph Fife*	guard	9	5' 10"	179	1942	Canton McKinley H. S.	Canton, OH
John Benz*	tackle	8	6' 2"	206	1941	Peabody H. S.	Pittsburgh, PA
Richard Fullerton*	center	5	6' 1"	183	1940	Peabody H. S.	Madison, NJ
George Allhouse	center	0	5' 10"	195	1942	Duquesne H. S.	Duquesne, PA
Thomas Murphy	quarterback	4	5' 11"	175	1942		Pittsburgh. PA
Joseph Rettinger*	end	9	5' 11"	184	1941	Ashland H. S.	Ashland, PA
William Benghouser	tackle	2	6'	208	1942	Central Catholic H. S.	Pittsburgh, PA
William Frick	center	0	6'	190	1941	Taylor Allderdice H. S.	Pittsburgh, PA
Stanley Gervelis*	end	9	6' 1"	190	1942	Charleroi H. S.	Charleroi, PA
Melvin Andrews	guard	0	6'	190	1942	Etna H. S.	Etna, PA
Edgar Jones*	halfback	5	5' 9"	176	1942	Scranton H. S.	Scranton, PA
Albert Gurczenski	tackle	4	6' 1"	195	1941	Jeannette H. S.	Jeannette, PA
Harris Hawkins*	center	7	5' 10"	166	1941	New Martinsville H. S.	New Martinsville, WV
Michael Sekela*	fullback	7	6'	200	1941	Windber H. S.	Windber, PA
Robert Thurbon*	halfback	9	5' 10"	170	1941	Erie H. S.	Erie, PA
Ben Kish*	fullback	8	6'	200	1940	Tonawanda H. S.	Tonowanda, NY
William Fitchko	end	0	6'	167	1942	Gary H. S.	Gary, WV
Fred Noah	guard	0	5' 8"	176	1942		Pittsburgh, PA
Raymond Rabinek	guard	0	5' 9"	178	1942		Pittsburgh, PA
Emil Narick*	quarterback	9	6'	184	1940	Union H. S.	Benwood, WV
Ted Konetsky*	tackle	5	6' 1"	193	1941	German Township H. S.	German Township, PA
John Dickinson*	end	7	6'	185	1940	Peabody H. S.	Pittsburgh, PA
John Stahl	end	2	5' 10"	185	1942	Tarentum H. S.	Tarentum, PA
Stephen Sinco*	center	9	5' 11"	205	1942	Canonsburg H. S.	Canonsburg, PA
John Gregg	end	2	5' 11"	171	1942	Mt. Lebanon H. S.	Mt. Lebanon, PA
Frank Kristufek*	tackle	9	6'	200	1940	McKeesport H. S.	McKeesport, PA
Paul Foley	guard	1	5' 10"	189	1941	Swissvale H. S.	Swissvale, PA
Louis Sleber	halfback	1	5' 9"	170	1941	Sewickley Township H. S.	Herminie, PA
Ernest Bonelli*	fullback	8	5' 9"	185	1941	Aspinwall H. S.	Aspinwall, PA
Ralph Hafer*	tackle	9	6' 1"	196	1940	Dormont H. S.	Dormont, PA
Jack Goodridge*	end	8	5' 11"	175	1941	Washington H. S.	Washington, PA
Richard Cassiano*	halfback	9	5' 10"	173	1940	Albany H. S.	Albany, NY
George Mitchell	guard	3	6'	192	1942	Ellsworth H. S.	Ellsworth, PA
Robert Crissman	tackle	0	6' 1"	194	1942	Butler H. S.	Butler, PA
Walter Fridley	quarterback	0	5' 10"	175	1941	Kane H. S.	Kane, PA
John Ross	fullback	1	5' 10"	184	1942	Ellsworth H. S.	Ellsworth, PA
George Kracum*	halfback	7	6'	178	1941	Hazelton H. S.	Hazelton, PA
Rudolph Gradisek*	guard	9	5' 11"	193	1941	Sewickley Township H. S.	Herminie, PA
Harry Kindelberger	tackle	3	6' 1"	202	1942	Oil City H. S.	Oil City, PA
John Kapurka	end	1	5' 10"	180	1941		Pittsburgh, PA
Frank Goodell*	fullback	7	5' 10"	186	1940	Curtis H. S.	Staten Island, NY
Joe Cambal	tackle	2	6' 1"	203	1940	Kiskiminetas Springs H. S.	Springdale, PA
Bud Kincaid	guard	0	5' 10"	187	1942	Peru H. S.	Peru, IN
Robert Stodgell	guard	0	5' 11"	185	1942	Peru H. S.	Peru, IN
Albert Kunkel	center	0	6'	185	1942		Pittsburgh, PA
Harold Klein*	guard	9	5' 10"	185	1940	Altoona H. S.	Altoona, PA
John Sylvester	halfback	0	5' 9"	155	1941	Bentleyville H. S.	Bentleyville, PA
Allen Gartner	tackle	0	6' 1"	230	1942	Carrick H. S.	Carrick, PA
Frank Franchini	tackle	0	6' 1"	209	1939	Dormont H. S.	Dormont, PA
Earl Pressel	halfback	0	6'	180	1941	Hollidaysburg H. S.	Hollidaysburg, PA
Arthur Corace*	guard	9	5' 11"	190	1940	Carrick H. S.	Carrick, PA
William Wilson	end	0	6'	180	1942	Canonsburg H. S.	Canonsburg, PA
Val Foltz	guard	0	6'	200	1942	Greensburg H. S.	Greensburg, PA
Joseph Connell*	fullback	5	5' 11"	192	1942	Charleroi H. S.	Charleroi, PA
Carl Sardi	end	0	5' 10"	170	1941	Clarion H. S.	Clarion, PA
Robert Frost*	varsity student manager				1940		Pittsburgh, PA
* Letterman

== Game summaries ==
=== At Washington ===
Week 1: Pitt at Washington

Team	1	2	3	4	Total
• Pitt	7	6	0	14	27
Washington	0	0	6	0	6

- Date: September 30, 1939
- Location: Husky Stadium
  Seattle, WA
- Game start: 2:00 p.m.
- Game attendance: 25,000
- Game weather: cool
- Referee: Robert Morris (Seattle)

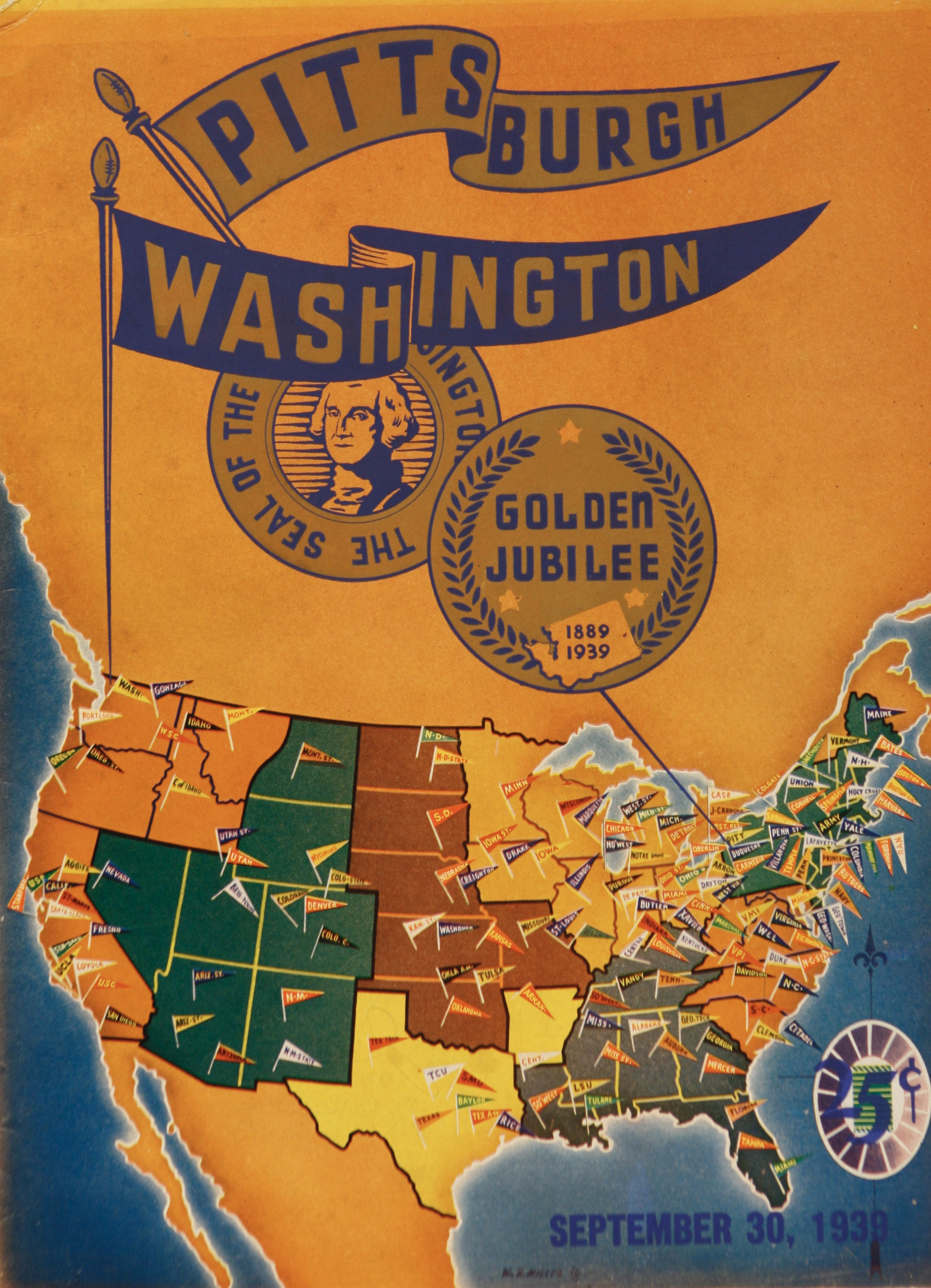
Program for September 30 game vs. Washington

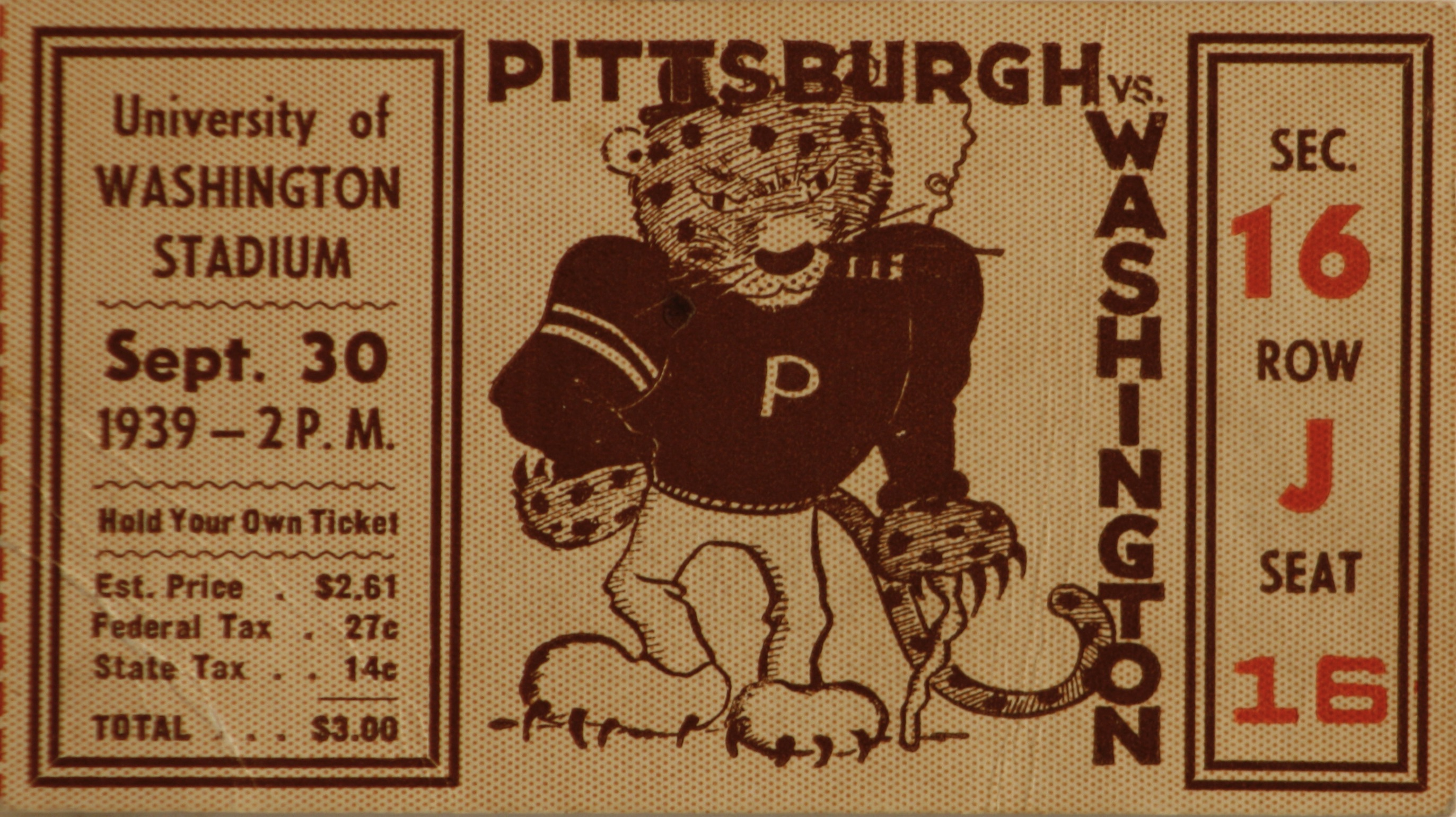
Ticket stub for game vs. Washington

On September 30, 1939, the Pitt Panthers opened their season against the Washington Huskies. This was their second meeting as the Panthers beat the Huskies in the 1937 Rose Bowl. But "the Huskies are eagerly hoping for revenge for that 21-to-0 whipping." Coach Jim Phelan was in his tenth-year and his Huskies were coming off a 3–5–1 record. Coach Phelan told the Sun-Telegraph: "We are ready to give the Panthers all we've got."

Pitt was the first team to travel across the country by air for a football game. The initial plan had scheduled stops in Minneapolis, MN, Bismark, ND, Billings, MT, and Spokane, WA. On Tuesday September 26 at 5:00 pm, Charley Bowser's Panthers boarded two 21-passenger airplanes for the 2,300 mile trip west to Seattle, WA. The team arrived in Minneapolis at 9:30 pm and spent the night. Wednesday they ate lunch in Billings and then encountered weather problems that forced them to land in Helena, MT. Due to the delay, the team flew directly into Seattle on Thursday afternoon. Coach Bowser held practice on the Husky Stadium turf on Thursday evening and again on Friday afternoon. Bowser told the Sun-Telegraph: "Washington has a good team. We've come a long way. I am not definitely set on my starting backfield. But we'll have 11 men on the field and be ready to go."

The one to four touchdown underdog Panthers surprised the odds makers with a 27 to 6 decision over the Huskies. Pitt scored in the first five minutes on a 70-yard drive that ended with a 20-yard touchdown pass from Emil Narick to Joe Rettinger. Rettinger added the extra point and Pitt led 7 to 0. Dick Cassiano ran in from 3 yards out in the second stanza to make the score 13 to 0 at halftime. In the third period, after the Huskies offense drove 46 yards in 12 plays, Washington halfback Don Jones plunged over center from the 1-yard line. Jones was wide on the point after and Pitt led 13–6. Pitt added two touchdowns in the final period. One was set up on a blocked punt by John Dickinson that Ted Konetsky recovered on the Huskies 3-yard line. The second followed an interception by Richard Fullerton that he returned 57 yards to the Huskies 9-yard line.

Coach Phelan told the press: "Pittsburgh has a great ball club. It's [sic] attack is sound and was beautifully executed this afternoon and Cassiano showed me that he is one of the best forward passers Washington has ever faced." The Huskies finished the season with a 4–5 record.

Due to bad weather, the Panther entourage had to take the southern route home over Los Angeles, CA, Albuquerque, NM and Kansas City, MO. Yet, when they arrived home on Tuesday, they were ready to fly to all their away games.

The Pitt starting lineup for the game against Washington was Joe Rettinger (left end), Frank Kristufek (left tackle), Rudy Gradisek (left guard), Richard Fullerton (center), Harold Klein (right guard), Ted Konetsky (right tackle), John Dickinson (right end), Ben Kish (quarterback), Dick Cassiano (left halfback), Emil Narick (right halfback) and Ernest Bonelli (fullback). Substitutes appearing in the game for Pitt were Stanley Gervelis, John Kapurka, Ralph Hafer, Harry Kindelberger, Arthur Corace, Paul Foley, Stephen Sinco, Harris Hawkins, Ralph Fife, George Mitchell, John Benz, Joe Cambal, Jack Goodridge, John Gregg, Mike Sekela, Thomas Murphy, George Kracum, Edgar Jones, Robert Thurbon, Louis Sleber, Frank Goodell and John Ross.

Scoring summary

Quarter	Time	Drive			Team	Scoring information	Score	
Quarter	Time	Plays	Yards	TOP	Team	Scoring information	Pittsburgh	Washington
1		9	70		Pittsburgh	Joe Rettinger 20-yard touchdown reception from Emil Narick, Joe Rettinger kick good	7	0
2		7	44		Pittsburgh	Dick Cassiano 1-yard touchdown run, Joe Rettinger (threw an incomplete pass) kick no good	13	0
3		12	46		Washington	Don Jones 1-yard touchdown run, Don Jones kick no good	13	6
4		3	3		Pittsburgh	Ben Kish 1-yard touchdown run, Joe Rettinger kick good	20	6
4		1	9		Pittsburgh	Ben Kish 9-yard touchdown reception from Dick Cassiano, Ben Kish kick good	27	6
"TOP" = time of possession. For other American football terms, see Glossary of American football.							27	6

=== West Virginia ===
Week 2: West Virginia at Pitt

Team	1	2	3	4	Total
West Virginia	0	0	0	0	0
• Pitt	0	6	14	0	20

- Date: October 7, 1939
- Location: Pitt Stadium
  Pittsburgh, PA
- Game start: 2:00 p.m.
- Game attendance: 30,000
- Game weather: sunny and warm
- Referee: Hol Slutz (Indiana)

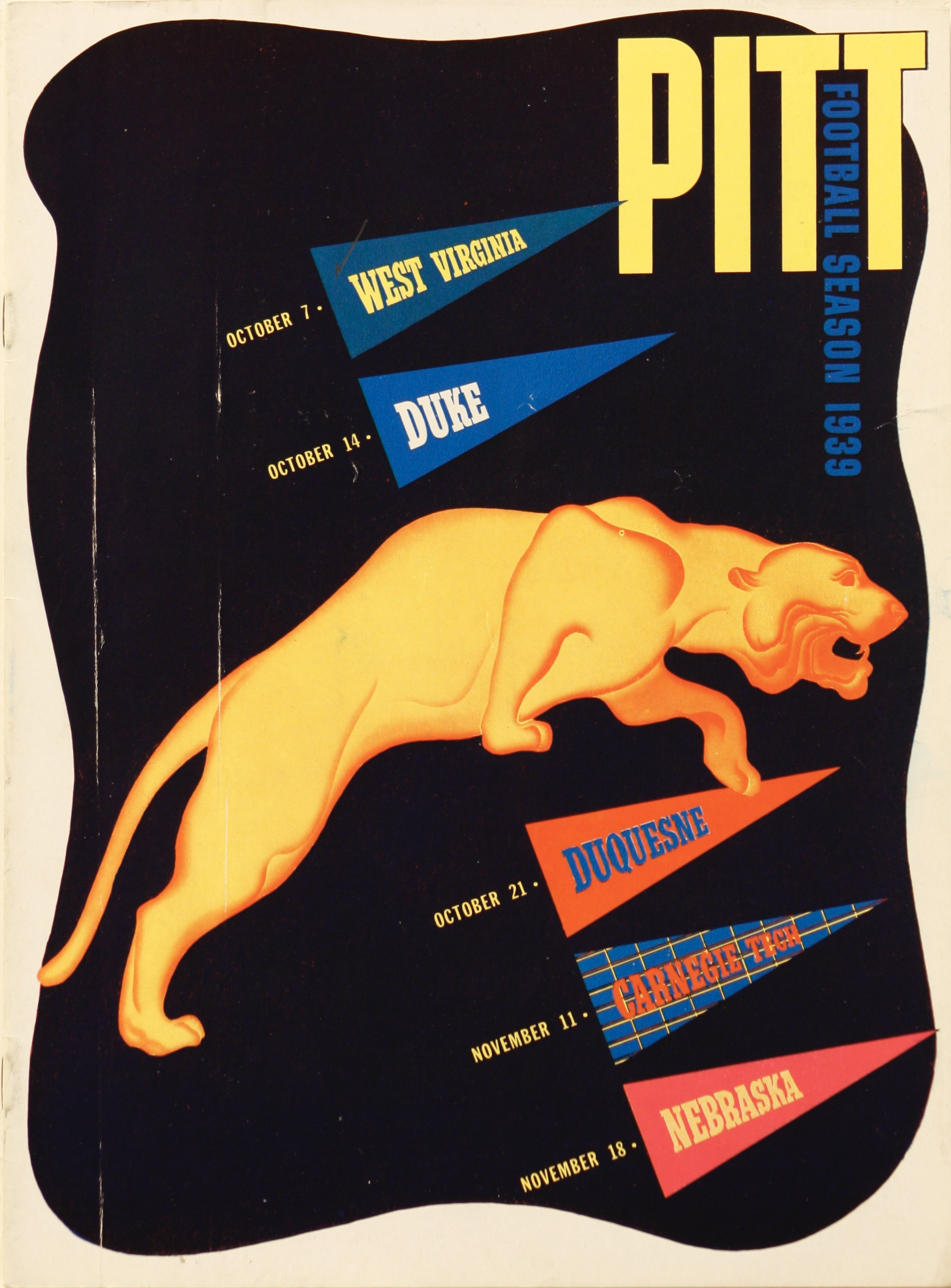
Program for October 7 game vs. West Virginia

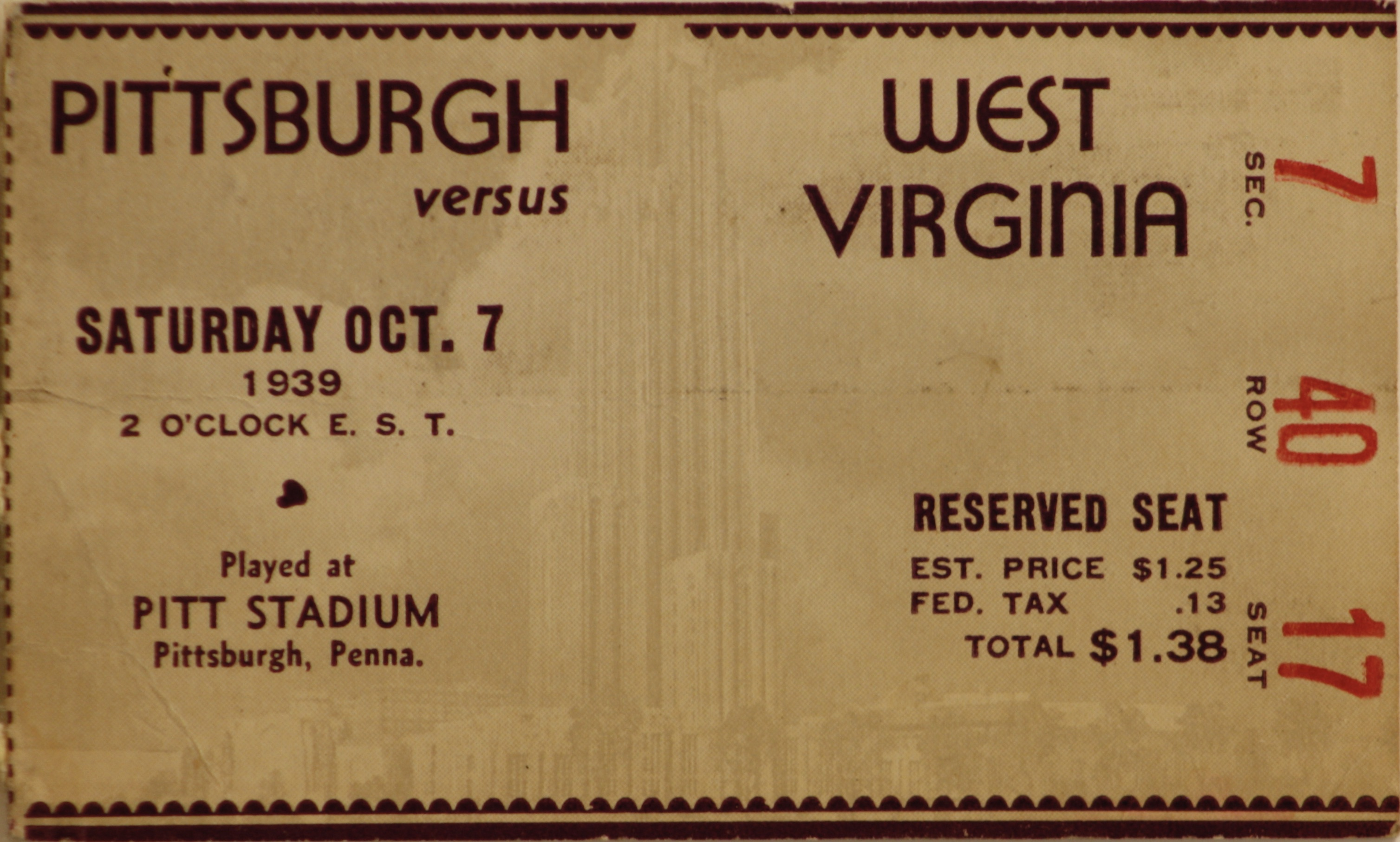
Ticket stub for October 7 game vs. West Virginia

On October 7, 1939, Coach Bowser's home opener came against the West Virginia Mountaineers. Pitt led the series 25–8–1 with the Mountaineers gaining only one victory in the previous 15 years. In 1937, Mountaineers coach Dr. Marshall Glenn led them to an 8–1–1 record, capped by a Sun Bowl victory over Texas Tech. But the Mountaineers followed that up with a disappointing 4–5–1 slate last year. West Virginia opened this season with a romp over West Virginia Wesleyan 44–0. Chester L. Smith of The Pittsburgh Press interviewed Coach Glenn: "The Doctor said he could be quoted as promising his lads would be in there pitching for the full 60 minutes, but he added an amendment which may be more significant than it sounds at first. 'We're not going to ruin our season as we did last year, and as many a former West Virginia team has done....We are better than we were last year when we lost to Pitt by 19 points'."

30,000 fans watched the Panthers continue their dominance over the Mountaineers with a 20 to 0 victory. After a scoreless first period, the Pitt offense drove 56 yards in 5 plays, and Dick Cassiano thrilled the crowd with a 38-yard run through left tackle for the first score of the game. The extra point went wide and Pitt led 6–0 at halftime. The Panthers offense marched 66 yards on their first possession of the second half. From the Mountaineers 23-yard line, Cassiano ran around right end to the nine where he fumbled. The ball was kicked into the end zone and Pitt center Richard Fullerton fell on it for the touchdown. Joe Rettinger added the point and Pitt led 13 to 0. Late in the same quarter Ernest Bonelli scored the final touchdown on a 2-yard plunge over center. Ben Kish added the placement.

The Panthers offense made 14 first downs and gained 345 yards, while the defense gave up 3 first downs and 64 yards. Coach Bowser was pleased: "The boys played a fine game against a tough West Virginia team. They blocked and charged well. Give West Virginia credit for its fine defensive stand."

Coach Glenn stated: "Pitt has a better running attack than it is given credit for this year. Cassiano showed some of the hardest running I've ever seen. Our team played well for a hot day, especially those who had to stay in there most of the game." The Mountaineers finished their season with a 2–6–1 record in what was Dr. Marshall Glenn's final season as coach at West Virginia.

The Pitt starting lineup for the game against West Virginia was Joe Rettinger (left end), Frank Kristufek (left tackle), Rudy Gradisek (left guard), Richard Fullerton (center), Harold Klein (right guard), Ted Konetsky (right tackle), John Dickinson (right end), Ben Kish (quarterback), Dick Cassiano (left halfback), Emil Narick (right halfback) and Ernest Bonelli (fullback). Substitutes appearing in the game for Pitt were Stanley Gervelis, Jack Goodridge, John Gregg, Ralph Hafer, William Benghouser, Joe Cambal, Arthur Corace, George Mitchell, Ralph Fife, Stephen Sinco, Harris Hawkins, Thomas Murphy, George Kracum, Edgar Jones, Robert Thurbon, Frank Goodell and Joseph Connell.

Scoring summary

Quarter	Time	Drive			Team	Scoring information	Score	
Quarter	Time	Plays	Yards	TOP	Team	Scoring information	West Virginia	Pittsburgh
2		5	56		Pittsburgh	Dick Cassiano 38-yard touchdown run, Joe Rettinger kick no good	0	6
3		7	66		Pittsburgh	Richard Fullerton recovered Cassiano's fumble in the end zone, Joe Rettinger added the extra point	0	13
3		9	55		Pittsburgh	Ernest Bonelli 2-yard touchdown run, Ben Kish kick good	0	20
"TOP" = time of possession. For other American football terms, see Glossary of American football.							0	20

=== Duke ===
Week 3: Duke at Pitt

Team	1	2	3	4	Total
Duke	7	6	0	0	13
• Pitt	0	7	7	0	14

- Date: October 14, 1939
- Location: Pitt Stadium
  Pittsburgh, PA
- Game start: 2:00 p.m.
- Game attendance: 49,000
- Game weather: cold and windy
- Referee: W. H. Friesell (Princeton)

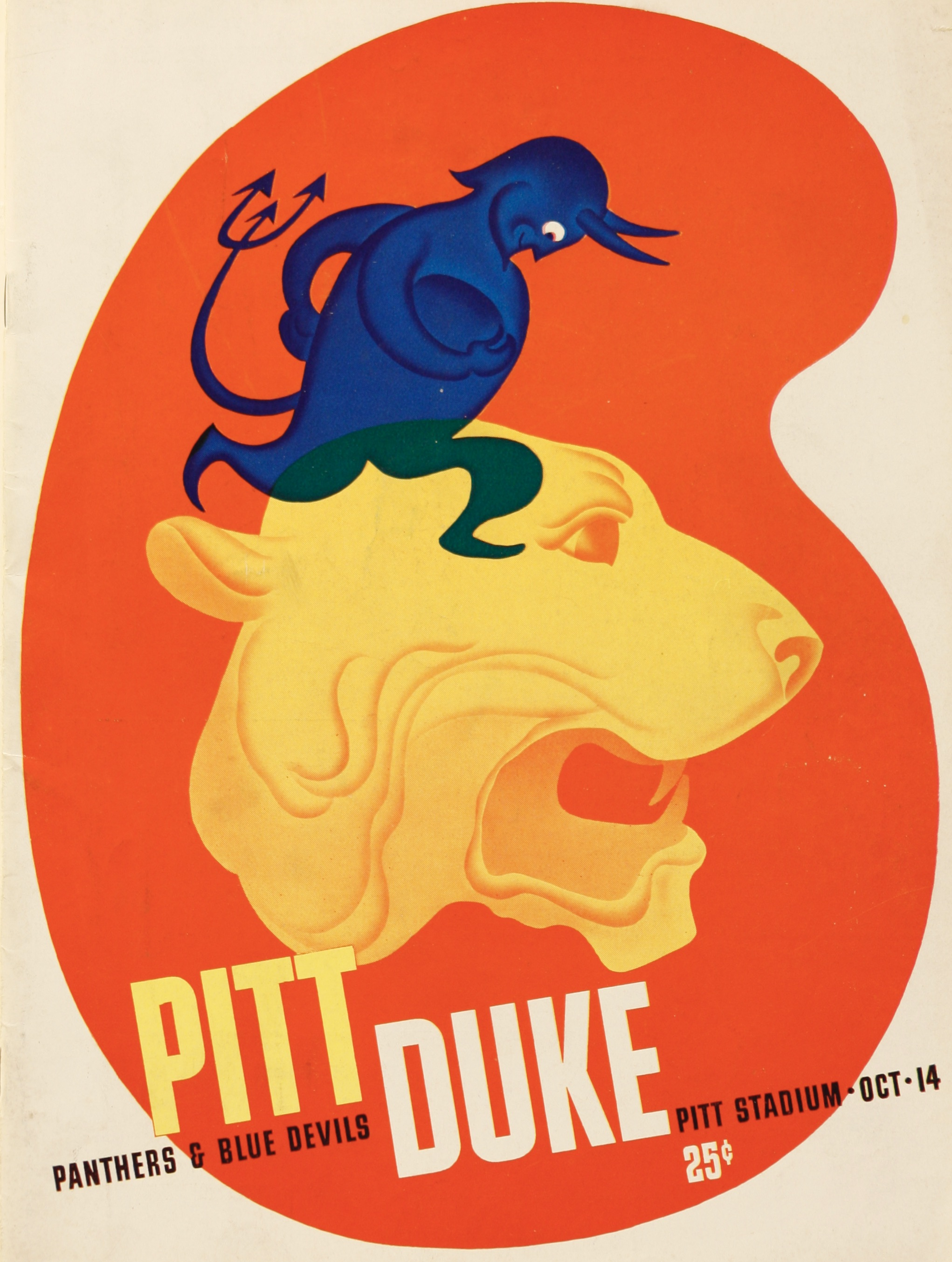
Program for the October 14 game vs. Duke

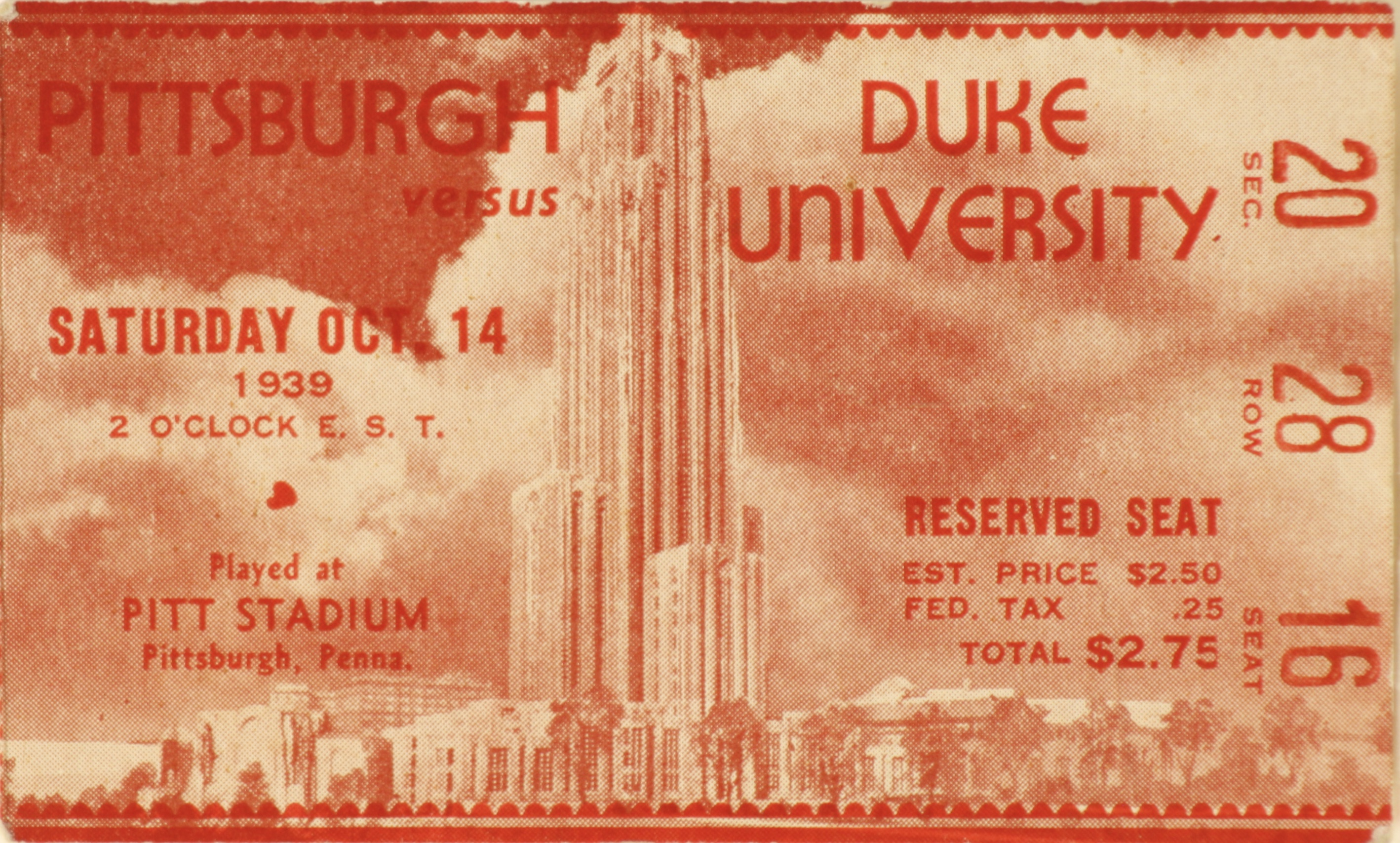
Ticket stub for October 14 game vs. Duke

The Duke Blue Devils made their first visit to Pitt Stadium on October 14, 1939. Pitt led the series 2–1, but all previous games were played in Durham, NC. Tenth-year coach Wallace Wade's Devils were coming off a banner 1938 season. They beat the Panthers (7–0) in a snowstorm to finish out their regular season undefeated, untied and unscored upon. They lost to USC in the Rose Bowl to close out their season. They arrived in Pittsburgh with a 2–0 record, having beaten Davidson (26–6) and Colgate (37–0). The Devils lineup featured 3 All-Americans: halfback George McAfee, guard Frank Ribar and guard Allen Johnson.

Halfback Dick Cassiano told "sportswriter" Jock Sutherland: "This is one of the games we particularly want, and I think the boys will be at their best." Pitt tackle Ted Konetsky and fullback Ernest Bonelli were injured in the West Virginia game and replaced in the starting lineup by John Benz and Frank Goodell.

On a cold and windy day in front of 49,000 fans, the Pitt Panthers remained unbeaten by defeating Duke by one point 14–13. The Panthers had to come from behind twice to secure the win. Duke scored in the first period on a 1-yard plunge by Roger Robinson, following a 6-play, 43-yard drive. Tony Ruffa converted the point after for a 7–0 lead. The Panthers answered in the second quarter. Pitt end John Dickinson recovered a fumble and raced 47 yards to the Duke 10-yard line. On first down Emil Narick passed to Dick Cassiano in the end zone for the touchdown. Ben Kish booted the extra point to tie the score. Before halftime, the Duke offense sustained an 8-play, 44-yard drive that ended with a Ruffa 2-yard scoring pass to George McAfee. Ruffa's extra point attempt was wide. In the third period Cassiano recovered a Duke fumble near mid-field. Nine plays later, a 28-yard pass from Narick to Cassiano tied the score, and Ben Kish's extra point put the Panthers ahead. The Panthers had the wind at their backs for the final quarter and Duke could not advance into Pitt territory for the remainder of the contest.

Coach Wade stated simply: "I think it was one of the finest games ever played." The Duke Blue Devils finished their season with an 8–1 record.

Coach Bowser said: "It was all hard football. We were lucky to win. I think we won by following the ball. And I want you to say for me that George McAfee is one of the greatest football players I've ever seen."

On October 17, the first Associated Press football poll ranked Pitt number 1.

The Pitt starting lineup for the game against Duke was Joe Rettinger (left end), Frank Kristufek (left tackle), Rudy Gradisek (left guard), Richard Fullerton (center), Harold Klein (right guard), John Benz (right tackle), John Dickinson (right end), Ben Kish (quarterback), Dick Cassiano (left halfback), Emil Narick (right halfback) and Frank Goodell (fullback). Substitute appearing in the game for Pitt were Stanley Gervelis, Ralph Hafer, Arthur Corace, Stephen Cinco, Ralph Fife, William Benghouser, Robert Thurbon and Ernest Bonelli.

Scoring summary

Quarter	Time	Drive			Team	Scoring information	Score	
Quarter	Time	Plays	Yards	TOP	Team	Scoring information	Duke	Pittsburgh
1		6	43		Duke	Roger Robinson 1-yard touchdown run, Tony Ruffa kick good	7	0
2		1	10		Pittsburgh	Dick Cassiano 10-yard touchdown reception from Emil Narick, Ben Kish kick good	7	7
2		8	44		Duke	George McAfee 2-yard touchdown reception from Tony Ruffa, Tony Ruffa kick no good	13	7
3		9	52		Pittsburgh	Dick Cassiano 28-yard touchdown reception from Emil Narick, Ben Kish kick good	13	14
"TOP" = time of possession. For other American football terms, see Glossary of American football.							13	14

=== Duquesne ===
Week 4: Duquesne at Pitt

Team	1	2	3	4	Total
Duquesne	7	6	0	0	13
• Pitt	0	7	7	0	14

- Date: October 21, 1939
- Location: Pitt Stadium
  Pittsburgh, PA
- Game start: 2:00 p.m.
- Game attendance: 23,000
- Game weather: cloudy and cool
- Referee: T. A. Timlin (Niagara)

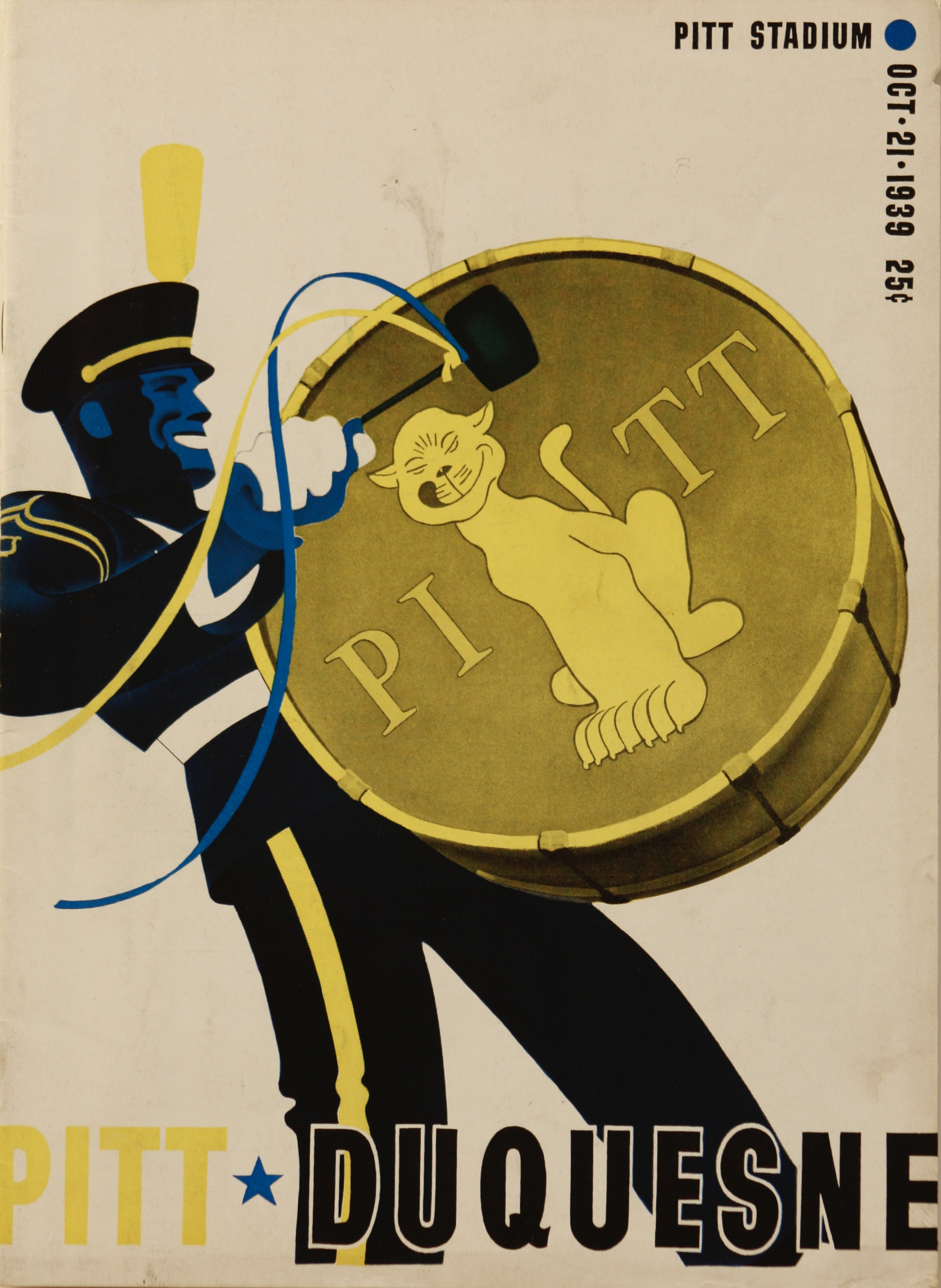
Program for the October 21 game vs. Duquesne

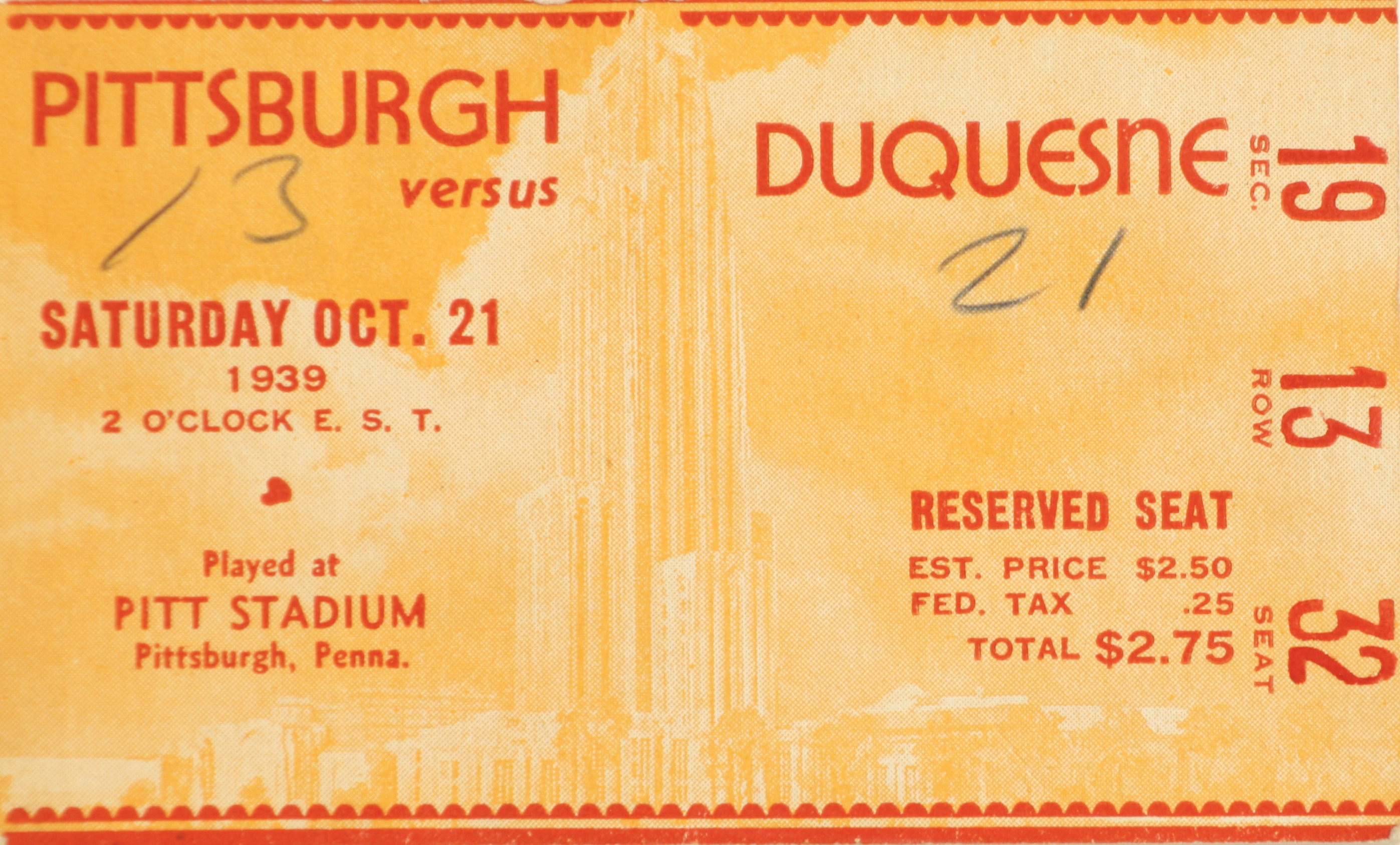
Ticket stub for October 21 game vs. Duquesne

On October 21, 1939, the Pitt Panthers and Duquesne Dukes played their final football game. The athletic department felt that the Panthers needed to schedule teams from the Western Conference (Big Ten), so the intra-city series against the Dukes was scratched. Pitt led the series 5–1. Duquesne's only victory was a 7–0 upset in 1936. Jack Sell of the Post-Gazette felt that the situation was ripe for another Duquesne upset since Pitt had played three hard games, and was looking ahead to a game at Fordham the following week. First-year coach Aldo Donelli's Dukes were undefeated and unscored upon with victories over Illinois Wesleyan (31–0), Waynesburg (20–0) and Manhattan (7–0).

Coach Bowser had fullback Ernest Bonelli back in the starting lineup, but John Benz again replaced Ted Konetsky at tackle.

In front of a disappointing crowd of 23,000 fans, Pitt scored two touchdowns in the opening quarter to take a 13–0 lead. The Duquesne Dukes then scored the final 21 points of the contest to upset the #1 Panthers 21–13. After 13 minutes of exchanging punts to gain field position, Pitt scored twice in 1 minute and 20 seconds. Pitt end Joe Rettinger blocked a Carl Nery punt that fell out of bounds on the Duquesne 8-yard line. On third down Ernest Bonelli went over center for the touchdown. Ben Kish's placement kick went wide left. Duquesne returned the kick-off to their 9-yard line, so they punted on first down. Pitt gained possession on their own 47-yard line. On first down Bonelli picked up 34 yards. Then Emil Narick passed 19-yards to Joe Rettinger for the touchdown, Rettinger added the point after. Late in the second quarter Pitt's James Thurbon shanked a punt and the Dukes gained possession on the Panthers' 26-yard line. A 20-yard pass completion followed by a 5-yard penalty placed the ball on the 1-yard line. 15 seconds before halftime, George Gonda scored the touchdown and Carl Nery added the point. The third quarter was scoreless, but Duquesne had possession in Pitt territory as the fourth period started. The Dukes punted and Pitt was backed up on their 18-yard line. An errant center snap bounced off of Cassiano's shoulder and into the arms of Duquesne end John Yacina. He ran unmolested for the score and John Rokiskey's placement put the Dukes ahead 14 to 13. The last gasp Panther offensive drive ended when they failed to convert a fourth down and 2 to go on the Duquesne 37-yard line. The Duquesne offense responded with an 8-play 63-yard drive. Philip Ahwesh completed a 19-yard pass to Rokiskey for the touchdown and Rokiskey added the placement to complete the upset.

Coach Aldo T. "Buff" Donelli told The Press: "I can't say too much about how this team came from behind, after trailing by 13 points. Most of our boys had never been behind in a varsity game, and the way they continued to fight for all they were worth represents more than all the victories in the world. That was victory in itself." The Duquesne Dukes finished the season ranked #10 in the AP final poll with an 8–0–1 record.

Coach Bowser stated: "Sometimes you're up, and then again – well, we weren't up today. Duquesne just outplayed us, I guess." Dick Cassiano added: "I guess we can't expect to win every time. But gosh, of all the games to lose – this is the toughest one to take."

The Pitt starting lineup for the game against Duquesne was Joe Rettinger (left end), Frank Kristufek (left tackle), Rudy Gradisek (left guard), Richard Fullerton (center), Harold Klein (right guard), John Benz (right tackle), John Dickinson (right end), Ben Kish (quarterback), Dick Cassiano (left halfback), Emil Narick (right halfback) and Ernest Bonelli (fullback). Substitutes appearing in the game for Pitt were Stanley Gervelis, Ralph Hafer, Arthur Corace, George Mitchell, Stephen Sinco, Ralph Fife, Albert Gurczenski, Jack Goodridge, Mike Sekela, Thomas Murphy, George Kracum, Robert Thurbon, Joseph Connell and Frank Goodell.

Scoring summary

Quarter	Time	Drive			Team	Scoring information	Score	
Quarter	Time	Plays	Yards	TOP	Team	Scoring information	Duquesne	Pittsburgh
1		3	8		Pittsburgh	Ernest Bonelli 1-yard touchdown run, Ben Kish kick no good	0	6
1		2	53		Pittsburgh	Joe Rettinger 19-yard touchdown reception from Emil Narick, Joe Rettinger kick good	0	13
2		4	26		Duquesne	George Gonda 1-yard touchdown run, John Rokisky kick good	7	13
4		1	18		Duquesne	Fumble recovery returned 18 yards for touchdown by John Yacina, John Rokisky kick good	14	13
4		8	63		Duquesne	John Rokisky 19-yard touchdown reception from Philip Ahwesh, John Rokisky kick good	21	13
"TOP" = time of possession. For other American football terms, see Glossary of American football.							21	13

=== At Fordham ===
Week 5: Pitt at Fordham

Team	1	2	3	4	Total
Fordham	7	6	0	0	13
• Pitt	0	6	7	14	27

- Date: October 28, 1939
- Location: Polo Grounds
  New York, NY
- Game start: 2:00 p.m.
- Game attendance: 36,000
- Game weather: clear and cool
- Referee: E. A. Geiges

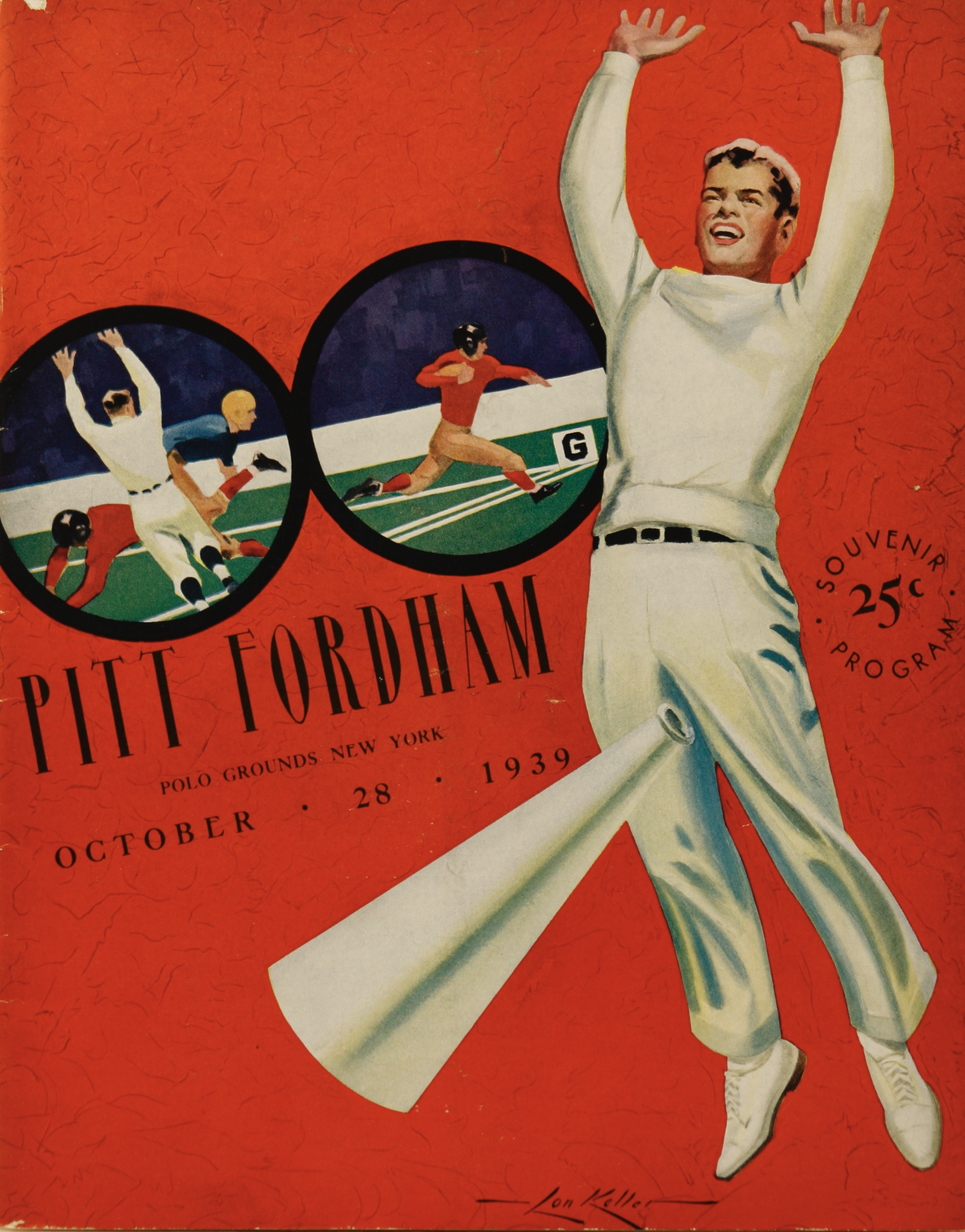
Program for October 28 game vs. Fordham

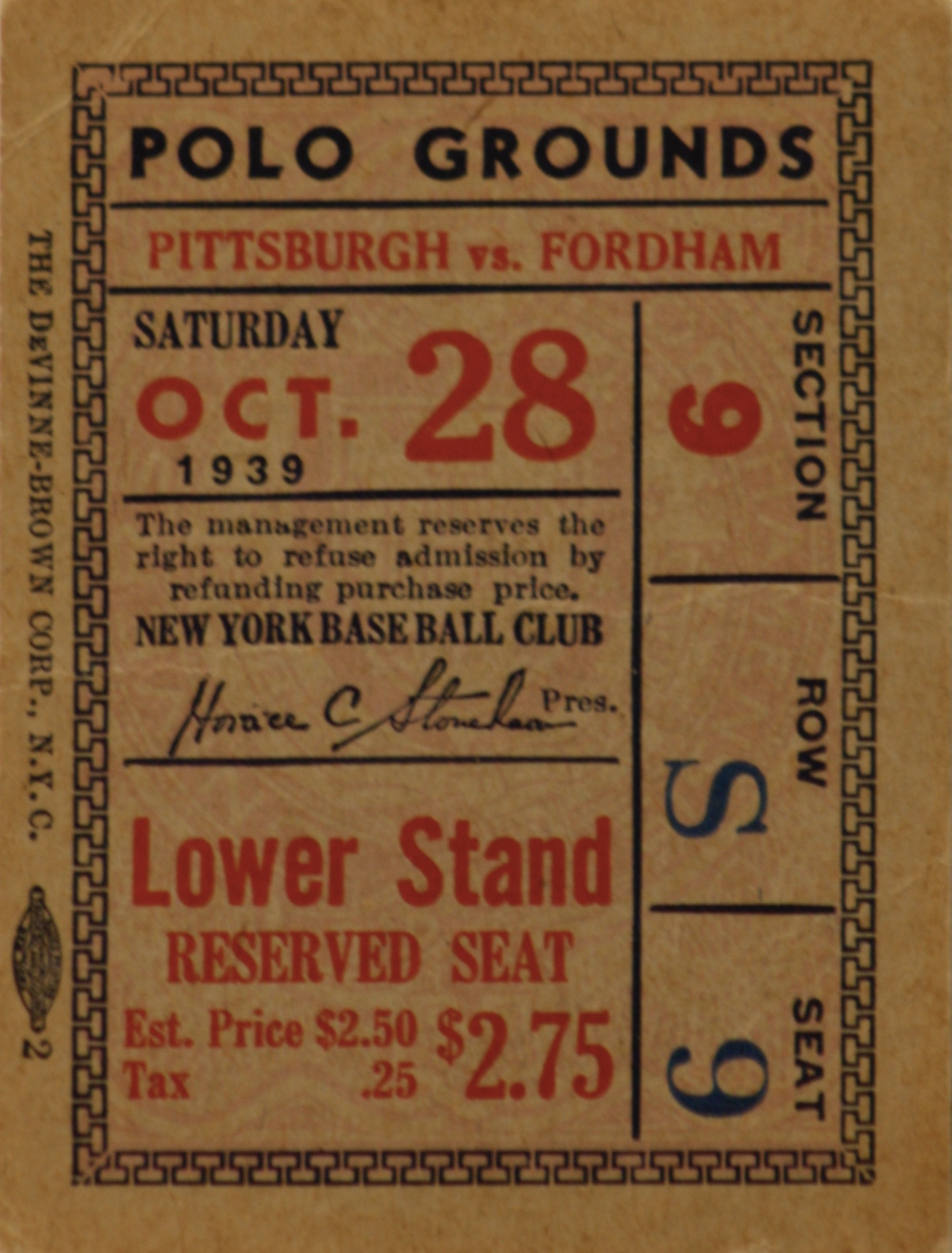
Ticket stub for October 28 game vs. Fordham

On October 28, for the fourth time in the five-year series, the Panthers traveled to New York's Polo Grounds to meet the Fordham Rams. Pitt led the series 1–0–3. After three scoreless ties in New York, the Panthers won at Pitt Stadium last year 24–13 . The favored Rams were 1–2 on the season, having beaten Waynesburg 34–7 and losing to Alabama 7–6 and Tulane 7–0. The Rams were led by All-American fullback Dom Principe. Coach Jim Crowley justified four sophomores in his starting lineup to Gene Ward of the Daily News: "I have to gamble. Injuries to key players and talent which hasn't quite lived up to advance notice leaves us only one recourse – to depend on sophomore inspiration."

While Pitt coaches Bowser and Nicksick directed the team in New York, the remaining coaching staff was busy: Walt Raskowski led the B squad against Navy in Annapolis; Chuck Shea was in Morgantown with the freshman team; Arnold Green scouted Nebraska in Manhattan, Kansas; Bill Daddio scouted Penn State at Syracuse; and Nick Kliskey scouted Temple against Bucknell in Philadelphia on Friday night before joining the varsity in New York City on Saturday.

For the second week in a row, the Panthers started strong, but were outplayed in the second half and went down to defeat. The first time the Panthers gained possession they drove 60 yards in 11 plays. Ernest Bonelli scored from the 1-yard line and Joe Rettinger added the point after for a 7 to 0 lead. In the second quarter, Fordham recovered a Pitt fumble on the Panther 32-yard line. The Rams needed five plays to score. James Blumenstock ran off tackle from the 8-yard line for the touchdown, but Alex Yudikaitas missed the extra point and Pitt led 7 to 6. The Panther offense answered with a 69-yard drive. Dick Cassiano passed 15 yards to Ben Kish for the score. Leonard Eshmont blocked the extra point, and Pitt led 13 to 6 at halftime. The second half was all Fordham. They tied the score early in the third period on a 48-yard pass play from Blumenstock to Vincent Dennery and placement by Stephen Kazlo. In the final stanza, the Pitt offense gained possession on the Rams 17-yard line. They earned a first down on the 3-yard line. On third down Cassiano went through right tackle and fumbled into the arms of Dennery who raced 99-yards for a touchdown. Kazlo tacked on the extra point and Pitt was behind 20 to 13. Later, a poor punt gave the Rams possession on the Pitt 28-yard line and five plays later Dominic Principe plunged across the goal line. Kazlo's extra point made the final score: Fordham 27 to Pitt 13. It was the first time in 15 years that Pitt lost two games in a row. The Fordham Rams finished the season with a 6–2 record.

Coach Bowser's post-game comment: "It was a great game." Coach Crowley was just as brief: "I am very proud that our boys came from behind twice to win."

The Pitt starting lineup for the game against Fordham was Joe Rettinger (left end), Frank Kristufek (left tackle), Rudy Gradisek (left guard), Richard Fullerton (center), Harold Klein (right guard), Ted Konetsky (right tackle), John Dickinson (right end), Ben Kish (quarterback), Dick Cassiano (left halfback), Emil Narick (right halfback) and Ernest Bonelli (fullback). Substitutes appearing in the game for Pitt were Stanley Gervelis, Jack Goodridge, Albert Gurczenski, Ralph Hafer, John Benz, Ralph Fife, Arthur Corace, Stephen Sinco, Harris Hawkins, Mike Sekela, George Kracum and Richard Thurbon.

Scoring summary

Quarter	Time	Drive			Team	Scoring information	Score	
Quarter	Time	Plays	Yards	TOP	Team	Scoring information	Pittsburgh	Fordham
1		11	60		Pittsburgh	Ernest Bonelli 1-yard touchdown run, Joe Rettinger kick good	7	0
2		5	33		Fordham	James Blumenstock 8-yard touchdown run, Alex Yudikiatis kick no good	7	6
2		7	69		Pittsburgh	Ben Kish 15-yard touchdown reception from Dick Cassiano, Joe Rettinger kick no good (blocked)	13	6
3		3	49		Fordham	Vincent Dennery 49-yard touchdown reception from James Blumenstock, Stephen Kazlo kick good	13	13
4		1	99		Fordham	Fumble recovery returned 99 yards for touchdown by Vincent Dennery, Stephen Kazlo kick good	13	20
4		5	27		Fordham	Dominic Principe 1-yard touchdown run, Stephen Kazlo kick good	13	27
"TOP" = time of possession. For other American football terms, see Glossary of American football.							13	27

=== At Temple ===
Week 6: Pitt at Temple

Team	1	2	3	4	Total
• Pitt	7	0	6	0	13
Temple	0	0	7	0	7

- Date: November 4, 1939
- Location: Temple Stadium
  Philadelphia, PA
- Game start: 2:00 p.m.
- Game attendance: 18,000
- Game weather: fair and cold
- Referee: D. Leo Daley (Boston College)

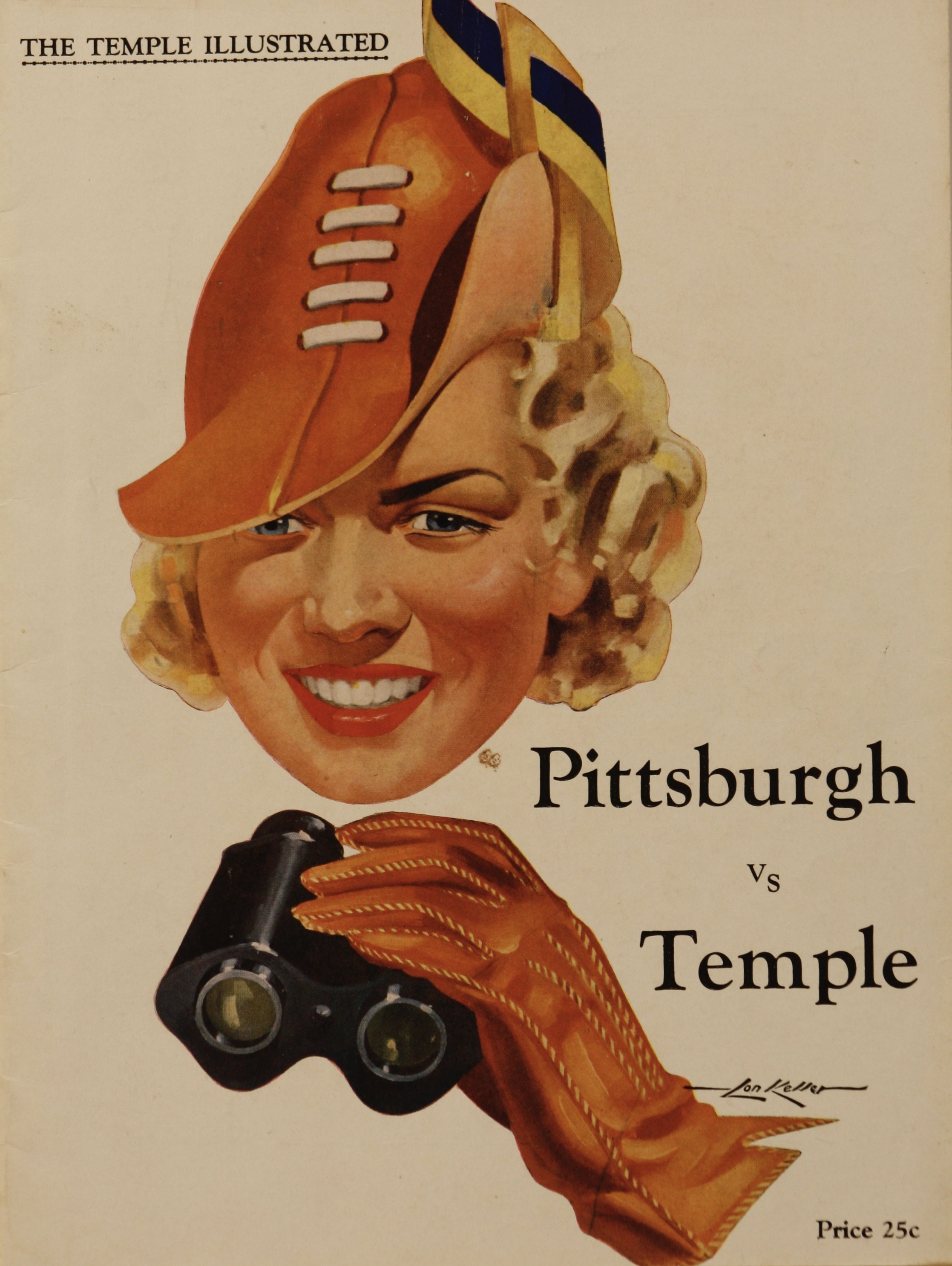
Program for the November 4 game vs. Temple

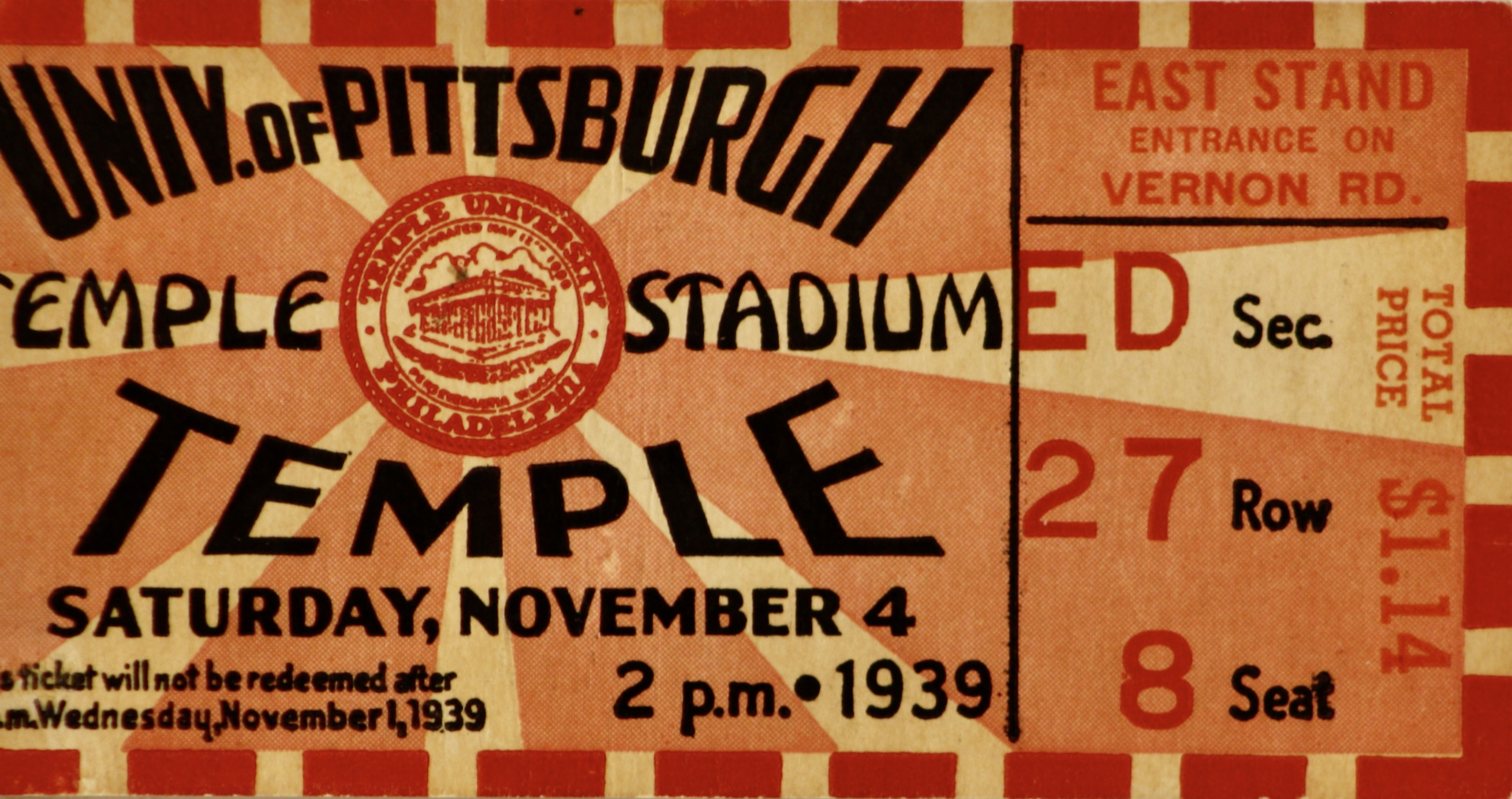
Ticket stub for November 4 game vs. Temple

On November 3, the Panthers traveled to Philadelphia for their second game against the Temple Owls. In 1938, which was Pop Warner's last season as Temple coach, the Panthers won the initial contest 28 to 6. Warner retired after the season and the Owls were now led by Fred Swan. They had a 2–3 record, having beaten TCU and Bucknell, and having lost to Georgetown, Carnegie Tech and Boston College.

Coach Swan told The Philadelphia Inquirer: "If the Temple team goes into the Pittsburgh game with the right mental attitude, there isn't any reason why it can't score a victory.... The situation is different than it was last year...Temple has been through the mill just as often as Pitt, and I believe our schedule has been every bit as tough as the one Pittsburgh has tackled. We're going to be ready for the game and we will have to be, for Charley Bowser's squad no doubt will be rebounding after the luckless defeats at the hands of Duquesne and Fordham in its last two starts."

The favored Panthers needed two replacements in their starting eleven. During the Fordham game, center Richard Fullerton sustained a concussion and was lost for the season, and tackle Ted Konetsky aggravated his leg injury. Coach Bowser started Harris Hawkins at center and John Benz at tackle.

The Pitt Panthers broke their 2-game losing skid with a 13 to 7 win. According to The Philadelphia Inquirer: "It was a game of fumbles, blocked kicks, intercepted passes and penalties. At times the officials stole the spotlight and almost a hundred (penalty) yards were meted out against the teams." The Panthers scored in the first period after a poor Temple punt gave Pitt possession on the Owl 46-yard line. Dick Cassiano gained 4 yards, and 5 more were added after an offside penalty against Temple. Emil Narick then threw a 37-yard touchdown pass to Cassiano. Joe Rettinger's placement made the score 7 to 0. The second period was scoreless. Early in the second half Emil Narick fumbled and Temple back Andy Tomasic recovered on the Pitt 18-yard line. On the fifth play Tomasic faked right, and raced around left end for an 11-yard touchdown. Jonah Bowles' extra point tied the game. After an exchange of punts, Temple lined up to punt from the Panther 49-yard line. Pitt end John Dickinson blocked the punt, picked up the ball and rambled to the Temple 8-yard line. Cassiano scored the go-ahead touchdown and Rettinger missed the extra point. Both offenses were plagued by interceptions and fumbles the remainder of the game. Final score: Pitt 13 to Temple 7. Temple finished the season with a 2–7 record.

The Pitt starting lineup for the game against Temple was Joe Rettinger (left end), Frank Kristufek (left tackle), Rudy Gradisek (left guard), Harris Hawkins (center), Harold Klein (right guard), John Benz (right tackle), John Dickinson (right end), Ben Kish (quarterback), Dick Cassiano (left halfback), Emil Narick (right halfback) and Ernest Bonelli (fullback). Substitutes appearing in the game for Pitt were Stanley Gervelis, Jack Goodridge, Ralph Hafer, Ted Konetsky, Albert Gurczenski, Arthur Corace, Ralph Fife, Stephen Sinco, Mike Sekela, Thomas Murphy, George Kracum, Robert Thurbon and Frank Goodell.

Scoring summary

Quarter	Time	Drive			Team	Scoring information	Score	
Quarter	Time	Plays	Yards	TOP	Team	Scoring information	Pittsburgh	Temple
1		3	46		Pittsburgh	Dick Cassiano 37-yard touchdown reception from Emil Narick, Joe Rettinger kick good	7	0
3		5	18		Temple	Andrew Tomasic 11-yard touchdown run, Jonah Bowles kick good	7	7
3		4	7		Pittsburgh	Dick Cassiano 4-yard touchdown run, Joe Rettinger kick no good	13	7
"TOP" = time of possession. For other American football terms, see Glossary of American football.							13	7

=== Carnegie Tech ===
Week 7: Carnegie Tech at Pitt

Team	1	2	3	4	Total
Carnegie Tech	0	0	0	0	0
• Pitt	0	0	0	6	6

- Date: November 11, 1939
- Location: Pitt Stadium
  Pittsburgh, PA
- Game start: 2:00 p.m.
- Game attendance: 55,000
- Game weather: fair and cold
- Referee: E. J. Heintz (Pennsylvania)

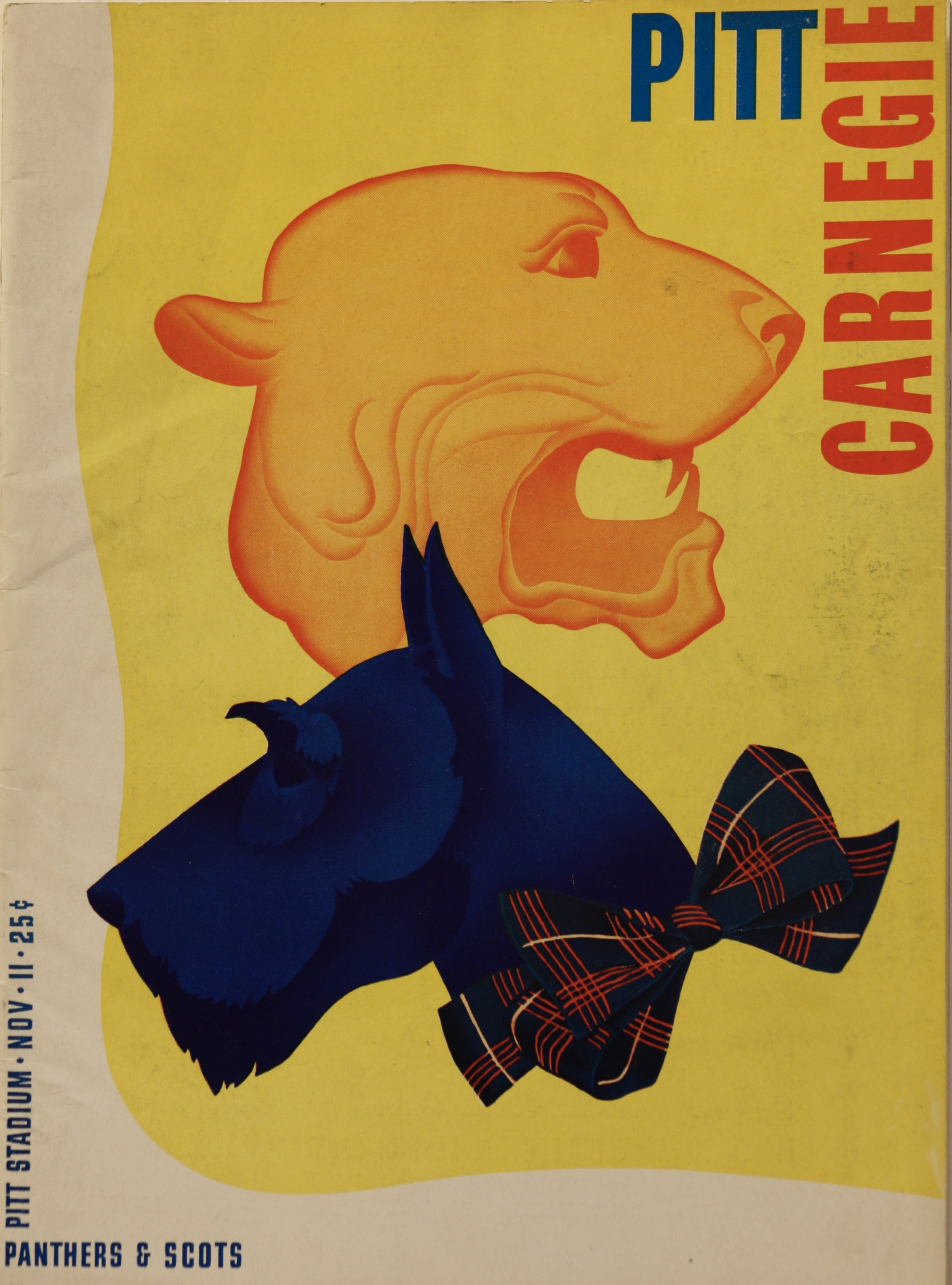
Program for November 11 game vs. Carnegie Tech

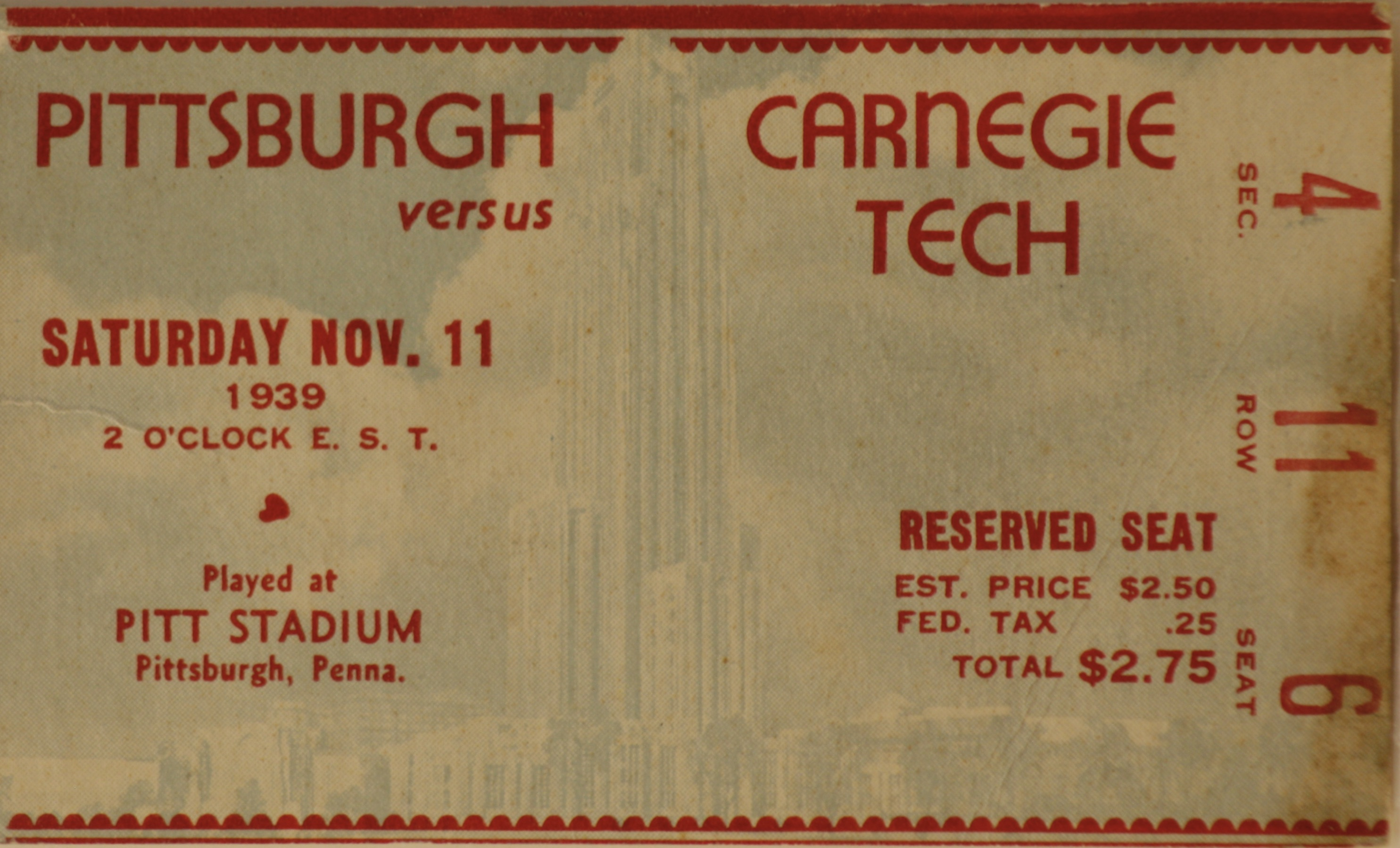
Ticket stub for November 11 game vs. Carnegie Tech

On November 11, the Panthers and Tartans met in the City Game for the twenty-fifth time. Even though Pitt led the series at 18–5–1, the Panthers were pointing to this game, and hoping to avenge Carnegie's previous year 20 to 10 upset.

Third-year coach Bill Kern's squad was 3–2. They won their first three games (all on the road) against Wittenberg (35–0), Temple (6–0) and Case (21–0). They lost at NYU (6–0) and at home versus Notre Dame (7–6).

55,000 fans had to wait more than 58 minutes for the Panthers to score a last gasp touchdown and defeat the Techsters 6 to 0. The first period was a series of punt exchanges with only Tech managing to earn a first down. In the second period, Pitt's Ben Kish punted poorly from his own 9-yard line and Tech gained possession on the Panther 31-yard line. Kish intercepted Merlyn Condit's fourth down pass to thwart the drive. Before halftime the Pitt offense advanced the ball to the Carnegie 24-yard line, but lost the ball on downs. At the start of the third quarter Tech marched to the Pitt 22-yard line, but the Panther defense stiffened and gained possession on downs. Pitt punted out of trouble. Later Condit shanked a punt and Pitt had the ball on the Tech 39-yard line. The Panther offense moved the ball to the 6-yard line where Emil Narick fumbled and Tech recovered. On second down Tartan fullback Jerry White raced 66 yards to the Panther 30-yard line, where he was tackled by Dick Cassiano. The Tech offense managed to gain a first down on the Pitt 20, but lost the ball on downs. After an exchange of punts, the Panthers had possession on their 31-yard line. James Thurbon and Edgar Jones were in the backfield for the Panthers. Thurbon carried three times and Jones once to set up first down on the Tech 38-yard line. Jones faded back to midfield and heaved a strike to Thurbon for the score with a minute and fifteen seconds left in the contest. Joe Rettinger's point after struck the upright, but Pitt was ahead 6 to 0. Pitt then iced the game with an interception.

Coach Bowser was pleased: "The team play of the Pitt eleven against Carnegie Tech gave all of us coaches a thrill; the Panthers offered a fine display of fundamental football and the morale of the club was high." Coach Kern offered: "If you ask me, I would say that Pitt richly deserved her fine victory over our team, and that game, by the way, was one of the fiercest I have seen in the Stadium in years."

Carnegie Tech finished the season with a 3–5 record.

The Pitt starting lineup for the game against Carnegie Tech was Joe Rettinger (left end), Frank Kristufek (left tackle), Rudy Gradisek (left guard) Harris Hawkins (center), Harold Klein (right guard), Ted Konetsky (right tackle), John Dickinson (right end), Ben Kish (quarterback), Dick Cassiano (left halfback), Emil Narick (right halfback) and Ernest Bonelli (fullback). Substitutes appearing in the game for Pitt were Stanley Gervelis, Jack Goodridge, John Benz, Ralph Hafer, Arthur Corace, Ralph Fife, Stephen Sinco, Mike Sekela, Edgar Jones, Robert Thurbon and Joseph Connell.

Scoring summary

Quarter	Time	Drive			Team	Scoring information	Score	
Quarter	Time	Plays	Yards	TOP	Team	Scoring information	Carnegie Tech	Pittsburgh
4		5	68		Pittsburgh	Robert Thurbon 39-yard touchdown reception from Edgar Jones, Joe Rettinger kick no good	0	6
"TOP" = time of possession. For other American football terms, see Glossary of American football.							0	6

=== Nebraska ===
Week 8: Nebraska at Pitt

Team	1	2	3	4	Total
• Nebraska	0	7	7	0	14
Pitt	0	6	0	7	13

- Date: November 18, 1939
- Location: Pitt Stadium
  Pittsburgh, PA
- Game start: 2:00 p.m.
- Game attendance: 30,000
- Game weather: cloudy
- Referee: W. H. Friesell (Princeton)

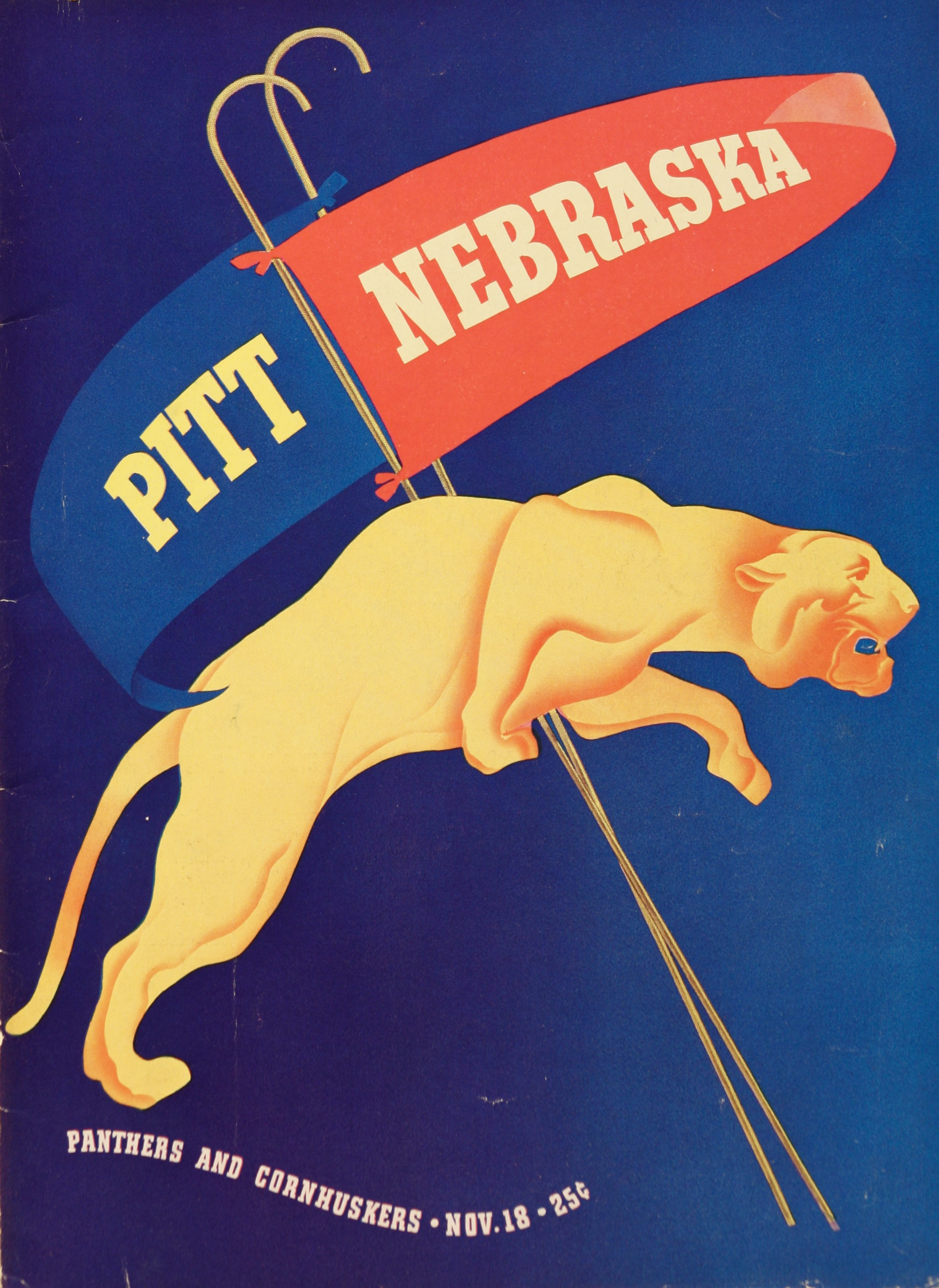
Program for November 18 game vs. Nebraska

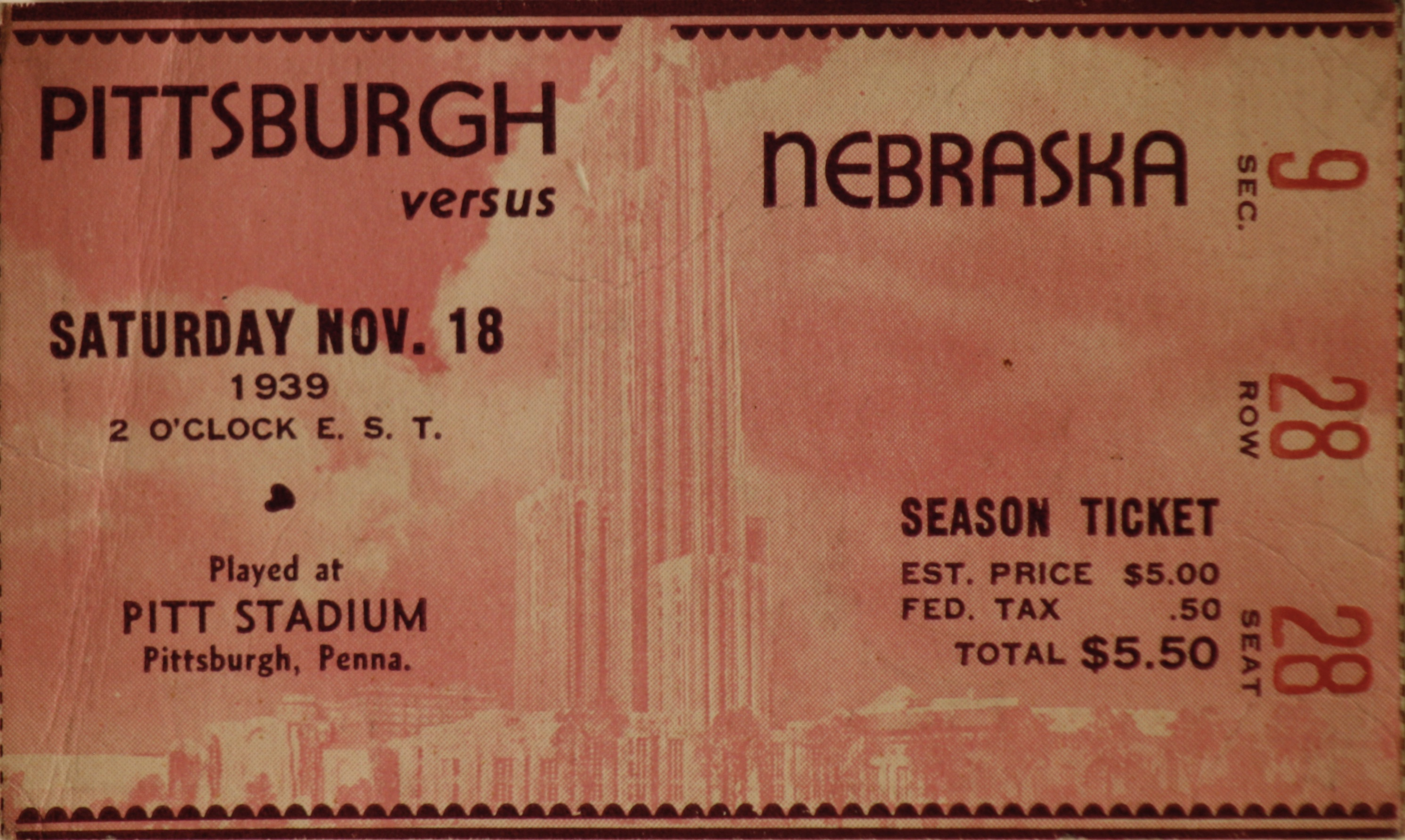
Ticket stub for November 18 game vs. Nebraska

On November 18, the Nebraska Cornhuskers came to Pittsburgh seeking their first victory over the Panthers since 1921. Pitt led the series 9–1–3 and had outscored the Huskers 161–49. The Panthers lost five starters to injury during the Carnegie Tech victory. Tackle Ted Konetsky, end John Dickinson, quarterback Ben Kish, halfback Dick Cassiano and fullback Ernest Bonelli did not start the Nebraska game. Coach Bowser went with John Benz at tackle, John Goodridge at end, Mike Sekela at quarterback, George Kracum at halfback and sophomore Joe Connell at fullback. Coach Bowser was optimistic: "Those injuries have hurt us an awful lot. We'll be up against a powerful team, one of the best Nebraska has had in years but we're not licked yet and won't be until the final gun finds us on the short end of the score."

The Biff Jones-led Huskers were 5–1–1, having lost to Missouri and tied Indiana. They were sitting in third place in the Big 6 Conference race. Walter E. Dobbins of the Evening State Journal noted: "In view of the fact that Pitt has dropped games to both Fordham and Duquesne, Nebraska's chances against the Panthers are considerably brighter than in the past...Fortunately the Huskers came thru the Jayhawk tussle without serious injury and barring accidents during the week should be able to face Charley Bowser's clan with its full strength."

18 years of frustration came to an end when a fumbled center snap on an extra point attempt by Pitt allowed the Nebraska Cornhuskers to eke out their second victory over the Panthers 14–13. The first period, in which the Panther defense needed a goal line stand after Nebraska had a first and goal from the 4-yard line, was scoreless. Early in the second period, Nebraska gained possession on the Pitt 32-yard line and Henry Rohn scored five plays later on a 1-yard run. Herman Rohrig's extra point put the Huskers ahead 7 to 0. The Panthers scored late in the half. Husker back Harry Hopp fumbled and Pitt's James Thurbon recovered on the Nebraska 30-yard line. On first down George Kracum threw a touchdown pass to Thurbon. Harris Hawkins' center snap to Thurbon for the placement attempt was botched and Pitt trailed 7 to 6 at halftime. Nebraska extended their lead in the third quarter after recovering an Emil Narick fumble on the Panther 25-yard line. Vike Francis carried the ball twice for the score. George Knight added the extra point. Nebraska led 14 to 6. In the final period, Pitt recovered Henry Rohn's fumble on the Panther 41-yard line and sustained an 8-play scoring drive, culminating with a Krakum 1-yard touchdown plunge. Joe Rettinger booted the placement, but Pitt trailed 14–13. The Nebraska offense was able to run out the clock. Pitt had three losses in a season for the first time since 1924. The Huskers finished their season ranked #18 in the Associated Press football poll with a 7–1–1 record.

Coach Jones was ecstatic: "This is the biggest day in Nebraska football. There are men who have traveled thousands of miles these past 20 years, I am told, to see this thing that happened today. First victory in 20 years – I'll say it's great." Coach Bowser was honest: "Those fumbles did us a lot of damage....However, Nebraska played headsup football and deserved its victory. They were able to take advantage of our fumbles, and all in all played good ball."

The Pitt starting lineup for the game against Nebraska was Joe Rettinger (left end), Frank Kristufek (right tackle), Rudy Gradisek (left guard), Harris Hawkins (center), Harold Klein (right guard), John Benz (right tackle), Jack Goodridge (right end), Mike Sekela (quarterback), George Kracum (left halfback), Emil Narick (right halfback) and Joseph Connell (fullback). Substitutes appearing in the game for Pitt were Stanley Gervelis, Ralph Hafer, Harry Kindelberger, Arthur Corace, Stephen Sinco, Ralph Fife, Albert Gurczenski, John Stahl, Thomas Murphy, Edgar Jones, Dick Cassiano, Robert Thurbon and Frank Goodell.

Scoring summary

Quarter	Time	Drive			Team	Scoring information	Score	
Quarter	Time	Plays	Yards	TOP	Team	Scoring information	Nebraska	Pittsburgh
2		5	32		Nebraska	Henry Rohn 1-yard touchdown run, Herman Rohrig kick good	7	0
2		1	30		Pittsburgh	Robert Thurbon 39-yard touchdown reception from George Kracum, Joe Rettinger kick no good, fumbled snap	7	6
3		2	25		Nebraska	Vike Francis 23-yard touchdown run, George Knight kick good	17	6
4		8	60		Pittsburgh	George Kracum 1-yard touchdown run, Joe Rettinger kick good	14	13
"TOP" = time of possession. For other American football terms, see Glossary of American football.							14	13

=== At Penn State ===
Week 9: Pitt at Penn State

Team	1	2	3	4	Total
Pitt	0	0	0	0	0
• Penn State	7	0	0	3	10

- Date: November 25, 1939
- Location: Beaver Field
  State College, PA
- Game start: 2:00 p.m.
- Game attendance: 20,000
- Game weather: cloudy
- Referee: J. R. Trimble (Dubuque)

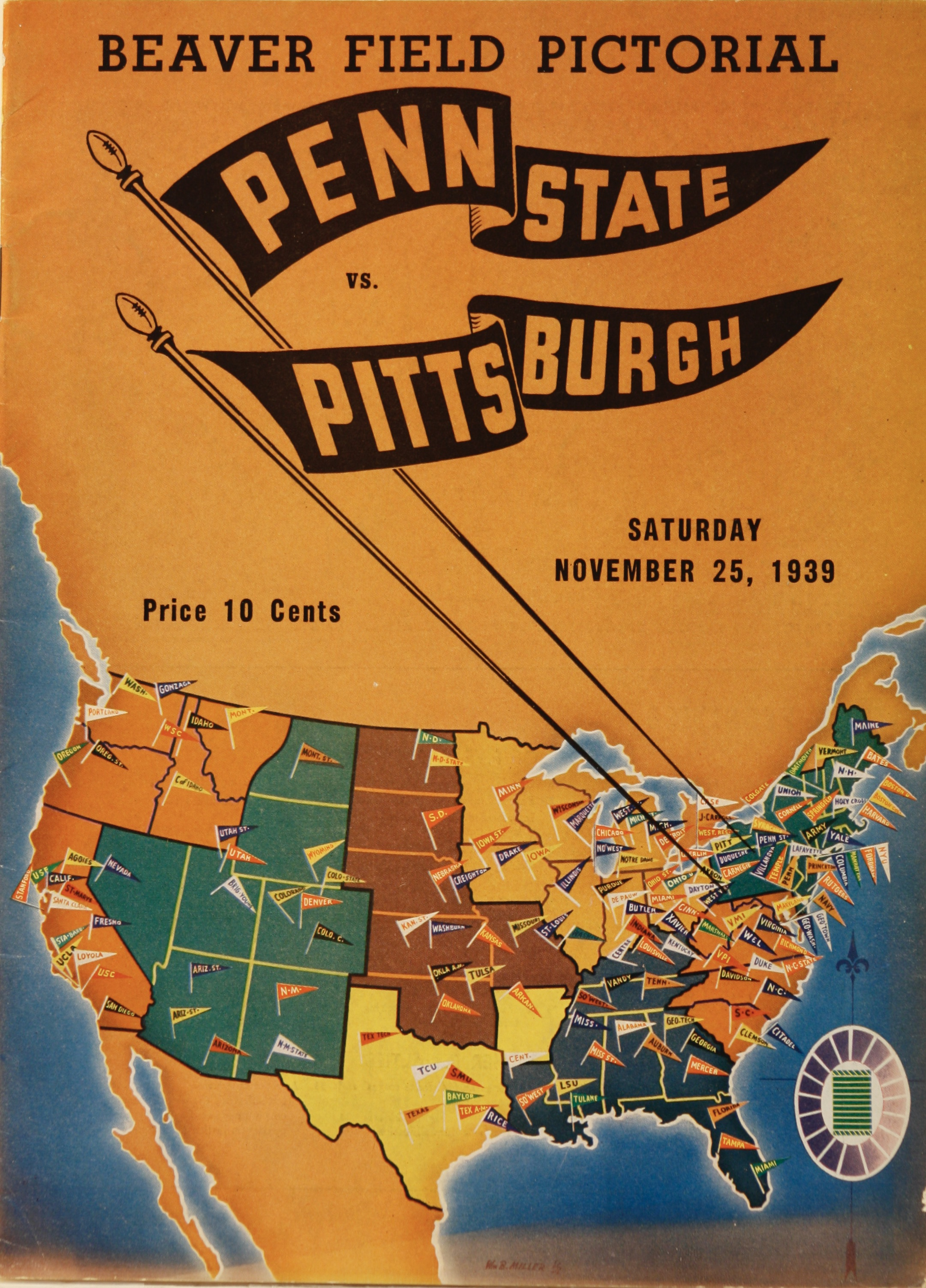
Program for November 25 game vs. Penn State

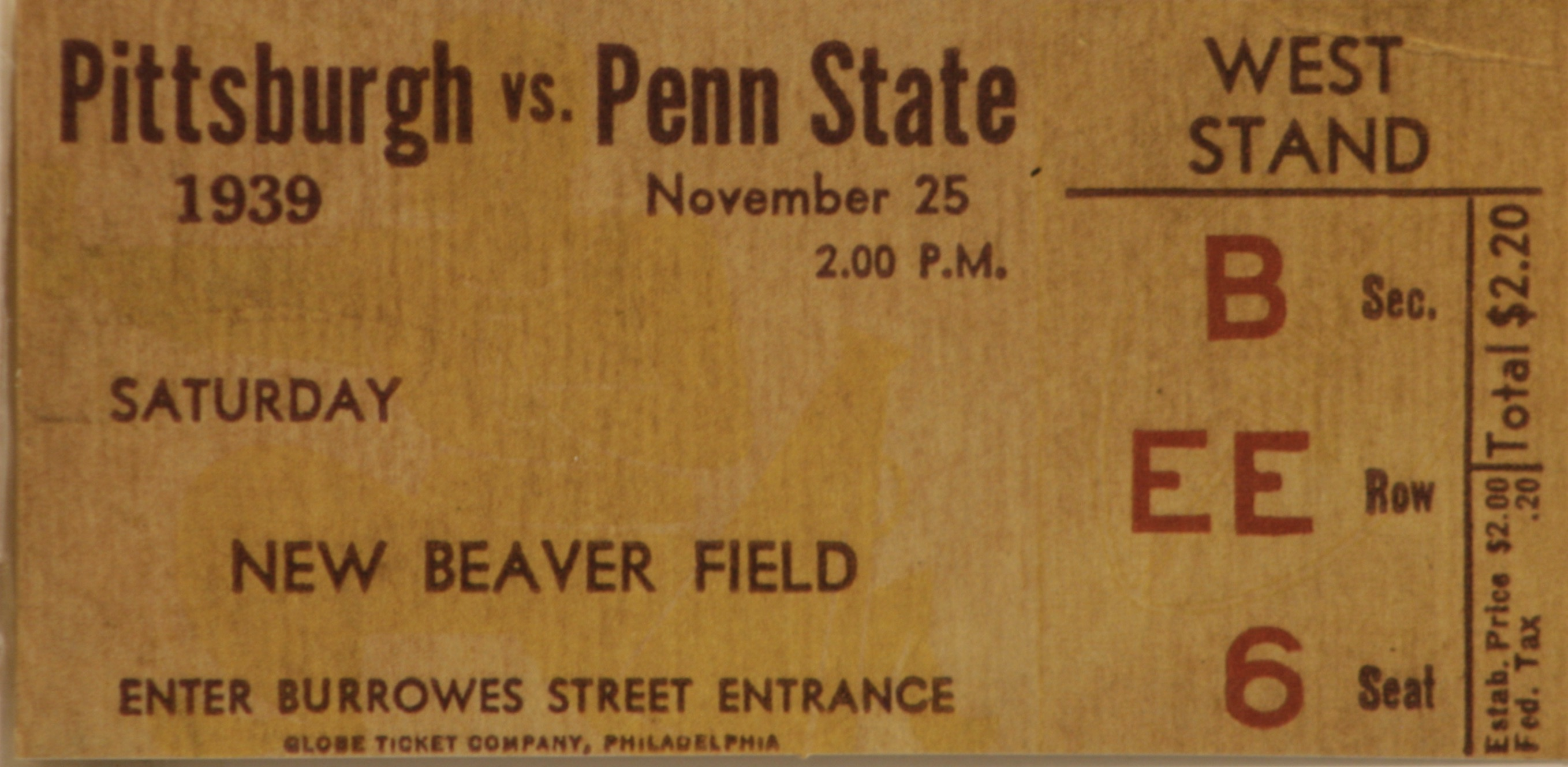
Ticket stub for November 25 game vs. Penn State

On November 25, the Panthers ended their season at Penn State . Pitt led the series 23–13–2, but the game was played in State College only four times. Coach Bowser returned halfback Dick Cassiano to the Panther starting lineup, while quarterback Ben Kish, fullback Ernie Bonelli and tackle Ted Konetsky were still injured, but available for game action. Pitt had nine seniors playing their final game – Ben Kish, Frank Kristufek, Ralph Hafer, Joe Cambal, Harold Klein, Art Corace, Dick Cassiano, Emil Narick and Frank Goodell.

This was ten-year coach Bob Higgins' best Penn State team. They had a 4–1–2 record; having beaten Bucknell, Lehigh, Maryland and Penn; lost to Cornell; and tied Syracuse and Army. The Lions had three starters missing from their lineup - quarterback Steve Rollins, fullback Lloyd Ickes and guard Ted Nemeth.

Like Nebraska the previous week, Penn State broke their long losing streak against the Panthers with a 10 to 0 victory. In the opening quarter, Penn State scored 3 plays after Leon Gajecki recovered a Dick Cassiano fumble on the Pitt 22-yard line. Bill Smaltz plunged over right guard from the 1-yard line for the touchdown. Ben Pollack added the point after. State led 7 to 0. The Lions added a field goal in the final period. Penn State got possession on the Panther 46-yard line and seven plays later, John Patrick kicked a 24-yard field goal. Penn State earned 17 first downs to the Panthers 9 and out gained the Panthers 265 yards to 121. Pitt lost 2 of 5 fumbles and was penalized 11 times for 85 yards.

State coach Higgins was pleased: "Penn State has been waiting 20 years for this moment and naturally when it has arrived, it's hard for me to express my feelings... We are very proud, this year, to be able to defeat a team of Pitt's caliber." Coach Bowser was honest: "There was no doubt about the best team. Penn State dominated the play as no team has against Pitt all season."

The Pitt starting lineup for the game against Penn State was Joe Rettinger (left end), Frank Kristufek (left tackle), Rudy Gradisek (left guard), Harris Hawkins (center), Harold Klein (right guard), John Benz (right tackle), Jack Goodridge (right end), Mike Sekela (quarterback), Dick Cassiano (left halfback), Emil Narick (right halfback) and Joseph Connell (fullback). Substitutes appearing in the game for Pitt were Stanley Gervelis, John Stahl, Ted Konetsky, Ralph Hafer, Harry Kindelberger, Ralph Fife, Arthur Corace, Stephen Sinco, Robert Thurbon, Ernest Bonelli, George Kracum, Ben Kish, Edgar Jones and Frank Goodell.

Scoring summary

Quarter	Time	Drive			Team	Scoring information	Score	
Quarter	Time	Plays	Yards	TOP	Team	Scoring information	Pittsburgh	Penn State
1		3	22		Penn State	Bill Smaltz 1-yard touchdown run, Ben Pollack kick good	0	7
4		8	36		Penn State	24-yard field goal by John Patrick	0	10
"TOP" = time of possession. For other American football terms, see Glossary of American football.							0	10

== Individual scoring summary ==
1939 Pittsburgh Panthers scoring summary
Player	Touchdowns	Extra points	Field goals	Safety	Points
Richard Cassiano	6	0	0	0	36
Ben Kish	3	4	0	0	22
Joseph Rettinger	2	7	0	0	19
Ernest Bonelli	3	0	0	0	18
Robert Thurbon	2	0	0	0	12
Richard Fullerton	1	0	0	0	6
George Kracum	1	0	0	0	6
Totals	18	11	0	0	119

== Postseason ==
Off the field, athletic director James Hagan finalized the 1940 gridiron schedule. Duquesne and West Virginia were replaced by Missouri and Ohio State. West Virginia athletic director Roy Hawley was not pleased. He told The Pittsburgh Press that the game was set. "Jimmy Hagan and I had agreed on Nov. 9 as the date." Hagan countered: "We had no agreement, verbal or otherwise, to play in 1940. When the chance to play Ohio State was offered us, we had to drop West Virginia to stay within our allotted eight games per season."

Twenty-six players received varsity letters for the 1939 season: John Benz, Ernest Bonelli, Richard Cassiano, Joe Connell, Art Corace, John Dickinson, Ralph Fife, Richard Fullerton, Stan Gervelis, Frank Goodell, Jack Goodridge, Rudy Gradisek, Ralph Hafer, Harris Hawkins, Edgar Jones, Ben Kish, Harold Klein, Ted Konetsky, George Kracum, Frank Kristufek, Emil Narick, Joseph Rettinger, Mike Sekela, Steve Sinco, Robert Thurbon and Robert Frost, manager.

Quarterback Ben Kish and halfback Dick Cassiano were selected by coaches Andy Kerr and Bernie Bierman to play in the annual east–west all-star game at San Francisco's Kezar Stadium on New Year's Day.

== All-America ==
Dick Cassiano gained mention on the United Press third team; Newspaper Enterprise Association third team; Collegiate Writers' second team; and Life Magazine's second team.

== Team players drafted into the NFL ==
The following players were selected in the 1940 NFL draft.

Player	Position	Round	Pick	NFL club
Dick Cassiano	Back	6	49	Green Bay
Ben Kish	Back	8	61	Chicago Cardinals
