= 1939 Kansas State Wildcats football team =

American college football season

1939 Kansas State Wildcats football
- 1939 Nebraska vs. Kansas State football game
- Conference: Big Six Conference
- Record: 4–5 (1–4 Big 6)
- Head coach: Wesley Fry (5th season)
- Home stadium: Memorial Stadium

1939 Big Six Conference football standings
	Conf.					Overall
Team	W		L		T	W		L		T
No. 6 Missouri $	5	–	0	–	0	8	–	2	–	0
No. 18 Nebraska	4	–	1	–	0	7	–	1	–	1
No. 19 Oklahoma	3	–	2	–	0	6	–	2	–	1
Kansas	1	–	4	–	0	2	–	6	–	0
Iowa State	1	–	4	–	0	2	–	7	–	0
Kansas State	1	–	4	–	0	4	–	5	–	0
$ – Conference champion; Rankings from AP Poll

The 1939 Kansas State Wildcats football team represented Kansas State University in the 1939 college football season. The team's head football coach was Wesley Fry, in his fifth and final year of his at the helm of the Wildcats. The Wildcats played their home games in Memorial Stadium. The Wildcats finished the season with a 4–5 record with a 1–4 record in conference play. They finished in a three-way tie for last place in the Big Six Conference. The Wildcats scored 117 points and gave up 108 points.

Kansas State was ranked at No. 61 (out of 609 teams) in the final Litkenhous Ratings for 1939.

== Schedule ==
Date	Opponent	Site	TV	Result	Attendance	Source
September 30	Fort Hays*	Memorial Stadium; Manhattan, KS		W 34–7	6,000	
October 6	at Marquette*	Marquette Stadium; Milwaukee, WI		W 3–0	15,000	
October 14	Colorado*	Memorial Stadium; Manhattan, KS (rivalry)		W 20–0	7,000	
October 21	at Missouri	Memorial Stadium; Columbia, MO		L 7–9	12,000	
October 28	No. 10 Nebraska^{†}	Memorial Stadium; Manhattan, KS (rivalry)	W9XAK	L 9–25	15,000	
November 4	at Kansas	Memorial Stadium; Lawrence, KS (rivalry)		W 27–6		
November 11	No. 6 Oklahoma	Memorial Stadium; Manhattan, KS		L 10–13	17,545	
November 18	at Iowa State	Clyde Williams Field; Ames, IA (rivalry)		L 0–10	5,339	
November 25	at Boston College*	Fenway Park; Boston, MA		L 7–20	11,000	
*Non-conference game; ^{†}Homecoming; Rankings from AP Poll released prior to the game

== Homecoming game against Nebraska ==
Kansas State played the Nebraska Cornhuskers on October 28, 1939. This game is notable for being the first college football homecoming game ever televised., the second ever televised college football game and the first televised game west of New York City.

Kansas State scored first with a field goal, but two minutes later Nebraska took the lead. Nebraska won the game 25–9.

Although Nebraska entered the game a 12–5 favorite, the game itself was considered to a good test for Nebraska, who was undefeated at the time. The matchup was considered to be important to the outcome of the Big Six Conference championship. Nebraska ended the game as one of ten college teams in the US that were unbeaten up to that point.
