= 1939 Nebraska Cornhuskers football team =

American college football season

1939 Nebraska Cornhuskers football
- Conference: Big Six Conference

Ranking
- AP: No. 18
- Record: 7–1–1 (4–1 Big 6)
- Head coach: Biff Jones (3rd season)
- Offensive scheme: Single-wing
- Home stadium: Memorial Stadium

1939 Big Six Conference football standings
	Conf.					Overall
Team	W		L		T	W		L		T
No. 6 Missouri $	5	–	0	–	0	8	–	2	–	0
No. 18 Nebraska	4	–	1	–	0	7	–	1	–	1
No. 19 Oklahoma	3	–	2	–	0	6	–	2	–	1
Kansas	1	–	4	–	0	2	–	6	–	0
Iowa State	1	–	4	–	0	2	–	7	–	0
Kansas State	1	–	4	–	0	4	–	5	–	0
$ – Conference champion; Rankings from AP Poll

The 1939 Nebraska Cornhuskers football team was an American football team that represented the University of Nebraska in the Big Six Conference during the 1939 college football season. In its third season under head coach Biff Jones, the team compiled a 7–1–1 record (4–1 against conference opponents), finished second in the Big Six, and was ranked No. 18 in the final AP Poll. The Cornhuskers outscored opponents by a total of 115 to 70. They were also ranked at No. 9 in the 1939 Williamson System ratings, at No. 8 in the Boand System ratings, and at No. 23 in the Litkenhous Ratings.

The team played its home games at Memorial Stadium in Lincoln, Nebraska.

== Before the season ==
Coach Jones was under some scrutiny upon the start of his third year at the helm of the program, as it wasn't entirely clear if his successful first year in 1937 was a product of his leadership or a remnant of former head coach Dana X. Bible's legacy. After suffering a 3–5–1 campaign in 1938, the most losses in a single season since 1899, coach Jones needed to get the program back on its feet.

== Schedule ==
Date	Time	Opponent	Rank	Site	Result	Attendance	Source
September 30	2:00 p.m.	at Indiana*		Memorial Stadium; Bloomington, IN	T 7–7	18,000	
October 7	2:00 p.m.	Minnesota*		Memorial Stadium; Lincoln, NE (rivalry)	W 6–0	33,000	
October 14	2:00 p.m.	at Iowa State		Clyde Williams Field; Ames, IA (rivalry)	W 10–7	11,770	
October 21	2:00 p.m.	No. 19 Baylor*	No. 16	Memorial Stadium; Lincoln, NE	W 20–0		
October 28	2:00 p.m.	at Kansas State	No. 10	Memorial Stadium; Manhattan, KS (rivalry)	W 25–9		
November 4	2:00 p.m.	at Missouri	No. 10	Memorial Stadium; Columbia, MO (rivalry)	L 13–27	18,000	
November 11	2:00 p.m.	Kansas^{†}		Memorial Stadium; Lincoln, NE (rivalry)	W 7–0		
November 18	1:00 p.m.	at Pittsburgh*		Pitt Stadium; Pittsburgh, PA	W 14–13	30,000	
November 25	2:00 p.m.	No. 14 Oklahoma		Memorial Stadium; Lincoln, NE (rivalry)	W 13–7		
*Non-conference game; ^{†}Homecoming; Rankings from AP Poll released prior to the game; All times are in Central time

== Roster ==
Abel, George #47 G Alfson, Warren #22 G Ashburn, Jack #55 E Behm, Forrest #33 T Blue, Wayne #39 HB; Burruss, Robert #49 C Carper, Charles #58 E DeFruiter, Robert #46 HB; Dobson, Adna #53 G Francis, Vike #38 FB; Fuenning, Sam #57 G Haynes, Edgar #36 T Herndon, Clarence #34 T Herrmann, William #29 G Hopp, Harry #37 FB; Kahler, Robert #35 HB; Kahler, Royal #42 T Kelly, Howard #56 C Klum, Arlo #51 G Knickrehm, Hubert #40 T Knight, George #21 QB; Leik, Francis #60 T Ludwick, Robert #30 E Luther, Walter #27 HB; Meier, Fred #20 C	Monsky, Hubert #45 G Muskin, Leonard #43 T Myers, Lynn #64 G Nelson, Jack #65 T Petsch, Roy #13 QB; Porter, George #18 HB; Preston, Fred #52 E Prochaska, Jerome #32 E Prochaska, Ray #31 E Ramey, Robert #16 C Rohn, Henry #15 FB; Rohrig, Herman #25 HB; Rubottom, Don #10 HB; Schwartzkopf, Ed #17 G Schwartzkopf, Sam #54 T Seeman, George #41 E Simmons, Kenneth #19 HB; Stearns, George #48 G Thompson, Marvin #44 HB; Thompson, Theos #26 HB; Vincent, Jack #23 HB; Waddick, Donald #24 E Ziegler, Donald #50 E Zorn, Howard #68 G

== Coaching staff ==
Name	Title	First year in this position	Years at Nebraska	Alma mater
Lawrence Mcceney "Biff" Jones	Head coach	1937	1937–1941	Army
W. Harold Browne	Assistant coach	1930	1930–1940	
Roy Lyman		1936	1936–1941	
Harold Petz		1938	1936, 1938–1940	
Charles Armstrong		1937	1937–1942, 1944	
Adolph J. Lewandowski		1937	1937–1944	Nebraska
Paul Amen		1938	1938–1941	
Glenn Presnell		1938	1938–1942, 1946	Nebraska
Robert Mills		1939	1939	
William Pfeiff		1939	1939, 1942	

== Game summaries ==
=== Indiana ===
Nebraska at Indiana

Team	1	2	Total
Nebraska			7
Indiana			7

- Date: September 30
- Location: Memorial Stadium • Bloomington, Indiana

Indiana scored first and held Nebraska off with the narrow 7–0 lead for most of the rest of the game. Finally, as time was running out, the Cornhuskers pulled up to the Hoosier 1 yard line. After two subsequent scoring attempts were turned away, Nebraska executed a reverse around the right and scored with less than 90 seconds remaining to play. Indiana responded valiantly, quickly driving from their own 35 to the Nebraska 10 before a turnover ended their last hope with 35 seconds still on the clock. Indiana thus remained winless against Nebraska in all four of their attempts.

=== Minnesota ===
Minnesota at Nebraska

Team	1	2	3	4	Total
Minnesota	0	0	0	0	0
• Nebraska	0	6	0	0	6

- Date: October 7
- Location: Memorial Stadium • Lincoln, Nebraska
- Game attendance: 33,000

Minnesota visited Lincoln to face Nebraska, with Nebraska relying primarily on its rushing offense throughout the game. Nebraska completed only one pass, while its defense prevented Minnesota from scoring. Nebraska’s only touchdown came on the same play used for a score in its previous game against Indiana. Despite the win, Minnesota continued to lead the all-time series 15–4–2.

=== Iowa State ===
Nebraska at Iowa State

Team	1	2	3	4	Total
• Nebraska	3	0	7	0	10
Iowa State	0	0	0	7	7

- Date: October 14
- Location: Clyde Williams Field • Ames, Iowa
- Game attendance: 11,770

Nebraska opened the 1939 conference slate with a relatively easy win over Iowa State, running out to a 10–0 lead by the start of the 4th quarter. The Cyclones did manage a late rally to put up 7 late points, but the Cornhuskers successfully avenged the previous year's upsetting loss to Iowa State and padded the series lead over the Cyclones to 28–5–1.

=== Baylor ===
#19 Baylor at #16 Nebraska

Team	1	2	3	4	Total
#19 Baylor	0	0	0	0	0
• #16 Nebraska	6	0	14	0	20

- Date: October 21
- Location: Memorial Stadium • Lincoln, Nebraska

Baylor met Nebraska for the first time in what was presented initially as a marquee matchup of two highly touted lines. The day belonged to Nebraska all the way, however, as the Cornhuskers pulled up to a 6–0 lead by the half before breaking away with two more touchdowns in the 3rd quarter on their way to blanking the Bears in Lincoln.

=== Kansas State ===
#10 Nebraska at Kansas State

Team	1	2	Total
• #10 Nebraska			25
Kansas State			9

- Date: October 28
- Location: Memorial Stadium • Manhattan, Kansas

Kansas State found the scoreboard first on an early field goal, but a punt returned for a touchdown turned the tide, and two Wildcat fumbles later on handed additional points to the Cornhuskers, who never looked back. It was Nebraska's fourth straight win over Kansas State as the series was advanced to 20–2–2 all time.

The game was the second televised college football game of all time, and the first ever televised homecoming game.

=== Missouri ===
#10 Nebraska at Missouri

Team	1	2	Total
#10 Nebraska			13
• Missouri			27

- Date: November 4
- Location: Faurot Field • Columbia, Missouri

Missouri handed Nebraska its first and only loss of the season in Columbia, easily holding Nebraska off by a two-touchdown margin to hold onto the Missouri-Nebraska Bell. It was the second straight Tiger victory, but Missouri still lagged in the series 8–22–3.

=== Kansas ===
Kansas at Nebraska

Team	1	2	3	4	Total
Kansas	0	0	0	0	0
• Nebraska	7	0	0	0	7

- Date: November 11
- Location: Memorial Stadium • Lincoln, Nebraska

The Cornhuskers wasted no time in finding the scoreboard early on, but wasted two scoring attempts soon afterward to lost fumbles. The game remained fairly evenly matched thereafter, until a late spirited attack by the Jayhawks put a brief minor scare in Nebraska before being warded off. This was the 14th straight game dropped to the Cornhuskers, and the Jayhawks fell to 9–34–3 against the Cornhuskers in the series.

=== Pittsburgh ===
Nebraska at Pittsburgh

Team	1	2	Total
• Nebraska			14
Pittsburgh			13

- Date: November 18
- Location: Pitt Stadium • Pittsburgh

The bitter rivalry with Pittsburgh was continued when the Cornhuskers arrived for the game at Pitt Stadium with hopes to end the long streak of Nebraska futility against the Panthers. The Cornhuskers battled to a slim 7–6 halftime lead, a margin which would eventually prove enough for the win after both teams each managed a second half touchdown apiece. Nebraska's six-game losing streak and twelve-game winless streak against Pittsburgh, both all-time program records to date, were snapped at last. Still, this was only Nebraska's second win against Pittsburgh in all 14 attempts, leaving a long way for the Cornhuskers to go to catch up.

=== Oklahoma ===
#14 Oklahoma at Nebraska

Team	1	2	3	4	Total
#14 Oklahoma	7	0	0	0	7
• Nebraska	0	13	0	0	13

- Date: November 25
- Location: Memorial Stadium • Lincoln, Nebraska

Oklahoma, a recent source of frustration to Nebraska after defeating the Cornhuskers in the previous year and drawing up a tie the year before that, once again fell to Nebraska as the Cornhuskers wrapped up the conference slate with just one loss overall, to Big 6 champion Missouri. Though the Sooners scored early, Nebraska promptly answered before the half to take the lead, and no further scores were attained by either team afterwards. Nebraska improved in the series to 13–3–3.

== After the season ==
Coach Jones redeemed himself in a convincing manner following the disappointing 1938 season. Although Nebraska did not bring home a conference title this year, the Cornhuskers were able to defeat both bitter rivals Minnesota and Pittsburgh in the same season for the first time ever, and wrapped up the season with a defeat of #14 Oklahoma to move into the rankings themselves in the postseason poll. Coach Jones saw his overall career record at Nebraska bounce back substantially, to 16–7–4 (.667), while his conference total also improved to 9–4–2 (.667). The Cornhuskers now owned an overall record of 286–96–31 (.730) and a Big 6 conference record of 96–15–11 (.832).

=== Awards ===
Award	Name(s)
All American 2nd team	Warren Alfson
All Big 6	Warren Alfson, Herman Rohrig
