= 1939 Iowa State Cyclones football team =

American college football season

1939 Iowa State Cyclones football
- Conference: Big Six Conference
- Record: 2–7 (1–4 Big 6)
- Head coach: James J. Yeager (3rd season)
- Captain: Marty Boswell
- Home stadium: Clyde Williams Field

1939 Big Six Conference football standings
	Conf.					Overall
Team	W		L		T	W		L		T
No. 6 Missouri $	5	–	0	–	0	8	–	2	–	0
No. 18 Nebraska	4	–	1	–	0	7	–	1	–	1
No. 19 Oklahoma	3	–	2	–	0	6	–	2	–	1
Kansas	1	–	4	–	0	2	–	6	–	0
Iowa State	1	–	4	–	0	2	–	7	–	0
Kansas State	1	–	4	–	0	4	–	5	–	0
$ – Conference champion; Rankings from AP Poll

The 1939 Iowa State Cyclones football team represented Iowa State College of Agricultural and Mechanic Arts (later renamed Iowa State University) in the Big Six Conference during the 1939 college football season. In their third season under head coach James J. Yeager, the Cyclones compiled a 2–7 record (1–4 against conference opponents), tied for fourth place in the conference, and were outscored by opponents by a combined total of 117 to 50. They played their home games at Clyde Williams Field in Ames, Iowa.

Marty Boswell was the team captain. Center Jack West was selected as a first-team all-conference player.

Iowa State was ranked at No. 114 (out of 609 teams) in the final Litkenhous Ratings for 1939.

== Schedule ==
Date	Time	Opponent	Site	Result	Attendance	Source
September 23	2:00 p.m.	Coe*	Clyde Williams Field; Ames, IA	W 19–0	7,873	
September 29	9:00 p.m.	at Denver*	DU Stadium; Denver, CO	L 0–6	18,000	
October 7	2:00 p.m.	at Kansas	Memorial Stadium; Lawrence, KS	L 0–14	8,043	
October 14	2:00 p.m.	Nebraska	Clyde Williams Field; Ames, IA (rivalry)	L 7–10	11,770	
October 21	2:00 p.m.	at Drake*	Drake Stadium; Des Moines, IA	L 0–7	13,500	
October 28	2:00 p.m.	Missouri^{†}	Clyde Williams Field; Ames, IA (rivalry)	L 6–21	12,000	
November 4	2:30 p.m.	at No. 6 Oklahoma	Oklahoma Memorial Stadium; Norman, OK	L 6–38	20,417	
November 11	2:00 p.m.	at Marquette*	Marquette Stadium; Milwaukee, WI	L 2–21	15,000	
November 18	2:00 p.m.	Kansas State	Clyde Williams Field; Ames, IA (rivalry)	W 10–0	5,339	
*Non-conference game; ^{†}Homecoming; Rankings from AP Poll released prior to the game; All times are in Central time
