= 1939 Oklahoma Sooners football team =

American college football season

1939 Oklahoma Sooners football
- Conference: Big Six Conference

Ranking
- AP: No. 19
- Record: 6–2–1 (3–2 Big 6)
- Head coach: Tom Stidham (3rd season)
- Captain: Norval Locke
- Home stadium: Memorial Stadium

1939 Big Six Conference football standings
	Conf.					Overall
Team	W		L		T	W		L		T
No. 6 Missouri $	5	–	0	–	0	8	–	2	–	0
No. 18 Nebraska	4	–	1	–	0	7	–	1	–	1
No. 19 Oklahoma	3	–	2	–	0	6	–	2	–	1
Kansas	1	–	4	–	0	2	–	6	–	0
Iowa State	1	–	4	–	0	2	–	7	–	0
Kansas State	1	–	4	–	0	4	–	5	–	0
$ – Conference champion; Rankings from AP Poll

The 1939 Oklahoma Sooners football team was an American football team that represented the University of Oklahoma as a member of the Big Six Conference during the 1939 college football season. In their third year under head coach Tom Stidham, the Sooners compiled a 6–2–1 record (3–2 against conference opponents), finished in third place in the Big Six Conference, and outscored their opponents by a total of 186 to 62.

Oklahoma was ranked at No. 19 in the final AP Poll and at No. 8 in the final Litkenhous Ratings.

Two Sooners received All-America honors in 1939: tackle Gil Duggan and Pop Ivy. Five Sooners received all-conference honors: Duggan, Ivy, tackle Justin Bowers, and backs Beryl Clark and Robert Seymour.

== Schedule ==
Date	Opponent	Rank	Site	Result	Attendance	Source
September 30	SMU*		Oklahoma Memorial Stadium; Norman, OK	T 7–7	26,205	
October 7	at Northwestern*		Dyche Stadium; Evanston, IL	W 23–0	45,000	
October 14	vs. Texas*	No. 3	Cotton Bowl; Dallas, TX (rivalry)	W 24–12	28,000	
October 21	Kansas	No. 3	Memorial Stadium; Norman, OK	W 27–7		
October 28	Oklahoma A&M*	No. 6	Memorial Stadium; Norman, OK (Bedlam Series)	W 41–0		
November 4	Iowa State	No. 6	Memorial Stadium; Norman, OK	W 38–6	20,417	
November 11	at Kansas State	No. 6	Memorial Stadium; Manhattan, KS	W 13–10	17,545	
November 18	at No. 12 Missouri	No. 5	Memorial Stadium; Columbia, MO (rivalry)	L 6–7	27,000	
November 25	at Nebraska	No. 14	Memorial Stadium; Lincoln, NE (rivalry)	L 7–13	35,000	
*Non-conference game; Rankings from AP Poll released prior to the game

== Rankings ==
The first AP poll for 1939 came out on October 16. The Sooners were ranked third. They finished the year ranked 19th.

Ranking movements Legend: ██ Increase in ranking ██ Decrease in ranking — = Not ranked ( ) = First-place votes
	Week								
Poll	1	2	3	4	5	6	7	8	Final
AP	3 (10)	6 (2)	6 (2)	6 (3)	5 (2)	14	—	—	19

== NFL draft ==
The following players were drafted into the National Football League following the season.

Round	Pick	Player	Position	NFL team
3	17	Dick Favor	Back	Philadelphia Eagles
4	26	John Shirk	End	Chicago Cardinals
4	27	Pop Ivy	End	Pittsburgh Steelers
9	79	J. R. Manley	Guard	Green Bay Packers
10	88	Bob Seymour	Back	Washington Redskins
13	111	Al Coppage	End	Chicago Cardinals
13	116	Justin Bowers	Tackle	Detroit Lions
16	141	Beryl Clark	Back	Chicago Cardinals
18	165	Ralph Stevenson	Guard	Cleveland Rams
