= 1939 Kansas Jayhawks football team =

American college football season

1939 Kansas Jayhawks football
- Conference: Big Six Conference
- Record: 2–6 (1–4 Big 6)
- Head coach: Gwinn Henry (1st season)
- Captain: Milt Sullivant
- Home stadium: Memorial Stadium

1939 Big Six Conference football standings
	Conf.					Overall
Team	W		L		T	W		L		T
No. 6 Missouri $	5	–	0	–	0	8	–	2	–	0
No. 18 Nebraska	4	–	1	–	0	7	–	1	–	1
No. 19 Oklahoma	3	–	2	–	0	6	–	2	–	1
Kansas	1	–	4	–	0	2	–	6	–	0
Iowa State	1	–	4	–	0	2	–	7	–	0
Kansas State	1	–	4	–	0	4	–	5	–	0
$ – Conference champion; Rankings from AP Poll

The 1939 Kansas Jayhawks football team represented the University of Kansas in the Big Six Conference during the 1939 college football season. In their first season under head coach Gwinn Henry, the Jayhawks compiled a 2–6 record (1–4 against conference opponents), tied for fourth place in the conference, and were outscored by opponents by a combined total of 107 to 47. They played their home games at Memorial Stadium in Lawrence, Kansas.

The team's statistical leaders included Ed Hall with 189 rushing yards, Ralph Miller with 261 passing yards, Jake Fry with 137 receiving yards, and Fry and Milt Sullivant with 12 points scored each. Sullivant was the team captain.

Kansas was ranked at No. 109 (out of 609 teams) in the final Litkenhous Ratings for 1939.

== Schedule ==
Date	Opponent	Site	Result	Attendance	Source
September 29	at Drake*	Drake Stadium; Des Moines, IA	L 6–12	10,000	
October 7	Iowa State	Memorial Stadium; Lawrence, KS	W 14–0	8,043	
October 14	at Colorado A&M*	Colorado Field; Fort Collins, CO	W 7–0		
October 21	at No. 3 Oklahoma	Memorial Stadium; Norman, OK	L 7–27		
November 4	Kansas State	Memorial Stadium; Lawrence, KS (rivalry)	L 6–27		
November 11	at Nebraska	Memorial Stadium; Lincoln, NE (rivalry)	L 0–7		
November 18	George Washington*	Memorial Stadium; Lawrense, KS	L 7–14	5,000	
November 25	No. 10 Missouri^{†}	Memorial Stadium; Lawrense, KS (rivalry)	L 0–20		
*Non-conference game; ^{†}Homecoming; Rankings from AP Poll released prior to the game

== After the season ==
=== NFL draft ===
The following Jayhawk was selected in the 1940 NFL draft following the season.

Round	Pick	Player	Position	NFL club
14	123	Bill Bunson	Back	Philadelphia Eagles
