= 1939 Missouri Tigers football team =

American college football season

1939 Missouri Tigers football

Big 6 champion

Orange Bowl, L 7–21 vs. Georgia Tech
- Conference: Big Six Conference

Ranking
- AP: No. 6
- Record: 8–2 (5–0 Big 6)
- Head coach: Don Faurot (5th season)
- Home stadium: Memorial Stadium

1939 Big Six Conference football standings
	Conf.					Overall
Team	W		L		T	W		L		T
No. 6 Missouri $	5	–	0	–	0	8	–	2	–	0
No. 18 Nebraska	4	–	1	–	0	7	–	1	–	1
No. 19 Oklahoma	3	–	2	–	0	6	–	2	–	1
Kansas	1	–	4	–	0	2	–	6	–	0
Iowa State	1	–	4	–	0	2	–	7	–	0
Kansas State	1	–	4	–	0	4	–	5	–	0
$ – Conference champion; Rankings from AP Poll

The 1939 Missouri Tigers football team was an American football team that represented the University of Missouri in the Big Six Conference (Big 6) during the 1939 college football season. The team compiled an 8–2 record (5–0 against Big 6 opponents), won the Big 6 championship, lost to Georgia Tech in the 1940 Orange Bowl, outscored all opponents by a combined total of 155 to 79, and was ranked No. 6 in the final AP Poll. Don Faurot was the head coach for the fifth of 19 seasons. The team played its home games at Memorial Stadium in Columbia, Missouri.

The team's leading scorer was Paul Christman with 42 points. Christman was also selected as a first-team All-American by the All-America Board, Collier's Weekly (chosen by Grantland Rice), Newspaper Enterprise Association, and The Sporting News. He finished third in the 1939 Heisman Trophy voting, was inducted into the College Football Hall of Fame in 1956, and had his jersey (No. 44) retired at Missouri.

== Schedule ==
Date	Opponent	Rank	Site	Result	Attendance	Source
September 30	Colorado*		Memorial Stadium; Columbia, MO	W 30–0		
October 7	at Ohio State*		Ohio Stadium; Columbus, OH	L 0–19	58,165	
October 14	at Washington University*		Francis Field; St. Louis, MO	W 14–0	10,000	
October 21	Kansas State		Memorial Stadium; Columbia, MO	W 9–7	12,000	
October 28	at Iowa State		Clyde Williams Field; Ames, IA (rivalry)	W 21–6	12,000	
November 4	No. 10 Nebraska		Memorial Stadium; Columbia, MO (rivalry)	W 27–13	18,000	
November 11	at No. 17 NYU*		Yankee Stadium; Bronx, NY	W 20–7	30,000	
November 18	No. 5 Oklahoma	No. 12	Memorial Stadium; Columbia, MO (rivalry)	W 7–6	27,000	
November 25	at Kansas	No. 10	Memorial Stadium; Lawrence, KS (rivalry)	W 20–0		
January 1, 1940	vs. No. 16 Georgia Tech	No. 6	Burdine Stadium; Miami, FL (Orange Bowl)	L 7–21	35,000	
*Non-conference game; Rankings from AP Poll released prior to the game
