= 1939 Holy Cross Crusaders football team =

American college football season

1939 Holy Cross Crusaders football
- Conference: Independent
- Record: 7–2
- Head coach: Joe Sheeketski (1st season)
- Home stadium: Fitton Field

1939 Eastern college football independents records
	Conf.			Overall
Team	W	L	T	W		L		T
No. 4 Cornell		–		8	–	0	–	0
No. 10 Duquesne		–		8	–	0	–	1
Swarthmore		–		6	–	0	–	1
Scranton		–		7	–	0	–	2
Princeton		–		7	–	1	–	0
La Salle		–		6	–	1	–	1
Penn State		–		5	–	1	–	2
No. 11 Boston College		–		9	–	2	–	0
No. 17 Fordham		–		6	–	2	–	0
Villanova		–		6	–	2	–	0
Boston University		–		5	–	3	–	0
Brown		–		5	–	3	–	1
Dartmouth		–		5	–	3	–	1
Hofstra		–		4	–	3	–	0
NYU		–		5	–	4	–	0
Pittsburgh		–		5	–	4	–	0
Harvard		–		4	–	4	–	0
Manhattan		–		4	–	4	–	0
Penn		–		4	–	4	–	0
Syracuse		–		3	–	3	–	2
Vermont		–		3	–	3	–	2
Tufts		–		3	–	4	–	1
Yale		–		3	–	4	–	1
Army		–		3	–	4	–	2
Bucknell		–		3	–	5	–	0
Carnegie Tech		–		3	–	5	–	0
Providence		–		3	–	5	–	0
Columbia		–		2	–	4	–	2
Massachusetts State		–		2	–	5	–	2
Colgate		–		2	–	5	–	1
Temple		–		2	–	7	–	0
CCNY		–		1	–	7	–	0
Buffalo		–		0	–	7	–	0
Rankings from AP Poll

The 1939 Holy Cross Crusaders football team was an American football team that represented the College of the Holy Cross as an independent during the 1939 college football season. In its first year under head coach Joe Sheeketski, the team compiled a 7–2 record.

Holy Cross was ranked at No. 11 in the final Litkenhous Ratings for 1939. It was ranked at No. 42 in the 1939 Williamson System ratings.

The team played its home games at Fitton Field in Worcester, Massachusetts.

== Schedule ==
Date	Time	Opponent	Site	Result	Attendance	Source
September 30		Manhattan	Fitton Field; Worcester, MA	W 28–0	20,000	
October 7		LSU	Fitton Field; Worcester, MA	L 7–26	25,000	
October 14		at Georgia	Sanford Stadium; Athens, GA	W 13–0	15,000	
October 21	2:00 p.m.	Brown	Brown Stadium; Providence, RI	W 20–0	18,000	
October 28		Colgate	Fitton Field; Worcester, MA	W 27–7	15,000	
November 4		Providence	Fitton Field; Worcester, MA	W 46–0	10,000	
November 11		Temple	Fitton Field; Worcester, MA	W 14–0	15,000	
November 18		Carnegie Tech	Fitton Field; Worcester, MA	W 21–0	30,000	
December 2		vs. Boston College	Fenway Park; Boston, MA	L 0–14	40,000	
All times are in Eastern time
