= 1939 Brown Bears football team =

American college football season

1939 Brown Bears football
- Conference: Independent
- Record: 5–3–1
- Head coach: Tuss McLaughry (14th season)
- Captain: J. J. McLaughry
- Home stadium: Brown Stadium

1939 Eastern college football independents records
	Conf.			Overall
Team	W	L	T	W		L		T
No. 4 Cornell		–		8	–	0	–	0
No. 10 Duquesne		–		8	–	0	–	1
Swarthmore		–		6	–	0	–	1
Scranton		–		7	–	0	–	2
Princeton		–		7	–	1	–	0
La Salle		–		6	–	1	–	1
Penn State		–		5	–	1	–	2
No. 11 Boston College		–		9	–	2	–	0
No. 17 Fordham		–		6	–	2	–	0
Villanova		–		6	–	2	–	0
Boston University		–		5	–	3	–	0
Brown		–		5	–	3	–	1
Dartmouth		–		5	–	3	–	1
Hofstra		–		4	–	3	–	0
NYU		–		5	–	4	–	0
Pittsburgh		–		5	–	4	–	0
Harvard		–		4	–	4	–	0
Manhattan		–		4	–	4	–	0
Penn		–		4	–	4	–	0
Syracuse		–		3	–	3	–	2
Vermont		–		3	–	3	–	2
Tufts		–		3	–	4	–	1
Yale		–		3	–	4	–	1
Army		–		3	–	4	–	2
Bucknell		–		3	–	5	–	0
Carnegie Tech		–		3	–	5	–	0
Providence		–		3	–	5	–	0
Columbia		–		2	–	4	–	2
Massachusetts State		–		2	–	5	–	2
Colgate		–		2	–	5	–	1
Temple		–		2	–	7	–	0
CCNY		–		1	–	7	–	0
Buffalo		–		0	–	7	–	0
Rankings from AP Poll

The 1939 Brown Bears football team was an American football team that represented Brown University as an independent during the 1939 college football season. In their 14th year under head coach Tuss McLaughry, the Bears compiled a 5–3–1 record and outscored opponents by a total of 188 to 91.

Brown was ranked at No. 62 (out of 609 teams) in the final Litkenhous Ratings for 1939.

== Schedule ==
Date	Time	Opponent	Site	Result	Attendance	Source
September 30		Rhode Island State	Brown Stadium; Providence, RI (rivalry)	W 34–0	10,000	
October 7		Amherst	Brown Stadium; Providence, RI	W 20–14	8,000	
October 14		at Colgate	Colgate Athletic Field; Hamilton, NY	L 0–10	8,500	
October 21	2:00 p.m.	Holy Cross	Brown Stadium; Providence, RI	L 0–20	18,000	
October 28		at Princeton	Palmer Stadium; Princeton, NJ	L 12–26	25,000	
November 4		Tufts	Brown Stadium; Providence, RI	W 54–7	3,000	
November 11		at Yale	Yale Bowl; New Haven, CT	T 14–14	32,000	
November 18		Connecticut	Brown Stadium; Providence, RI	W 41–0	3,000	
November 30		Rutgers	Brown Stadium; Providence, RI	W 13–0		
All times are in Eastern time
