= 1939 Rutgers Queensmen football team =

American college football season

1939 Rutgers Queensmen football

Middle Three champion
- Conference: Middle Three Conference
- Record: 7–1–1 (2–0 Middle Three)
- Head coach: Harvey Harman (2nd season)
- Captain: William Tranavitch
- Home stadium: Rutgers Stadium

1939 Middle Three Conference football standings
| | Conf. | | | | | Overall |
| Team | W | | L | | T | W | | L | | T |
|---|---|---|---|---|---|---|---|---|---|---|
| Rutgers $ | 2 | – | 0 | – | 0 | 7 | – | 1 | – | 1 |
| Lafayette | 1 | – | 1 | – | 0 | 4 | – | 5 | – | 0 |
| Lehigh | 0 | – | 2 | – | 0 | 3 | – | 6 | – | 0 |
$ – Conference champion

The 1939 Rutgers Queensmen football team represented Rutgers University in the 1939 college football season. In their second season under head coach Harvey Harman, the Queensmen compiled a 7–1–1 record, won the Middle Three Conference championship, and outscored their opponents 146 to 70. Rutgers was undefeated in its first eight games, but fell short of its first undefeated season in 70 years when Brown scored 13 points in the fourth quarter to defeat the Queensmen, 13–0, in a Thanksgiving Day game at Providence, Rhode Island.

Rutgers was ranked at No. 106 (out of 609 teams) in the final Litkenhous Ratings for 1939.

== Schedule ==
| Date | Opponent | Site | Result | Attendance | Source |
|---|---|---|---|---|---|
| September 30 | Wesleyan | Rutgers Stadium; Piscataway, NJ | W 13–7 | 6,000 | |
| October 7 | Wooster | Rutgers Stadium; Piscataway, NJ | W 20–0 | | |
| October 14 | Richmond | Rutgers Stadium; Piscataway, NJ | T 6–6 | | |
| October 21 | Maryland | Rutgers Stadium; Piscataway, NJ | W 25–12 | 8,500 | |
| October 28 | Lehigh | Rutgers Stadium; Piscataway, NJ | W 13–0 | | |
| November 4 | New Hampshire | Rutgers Stadium; Piscataway, NJ | W 32–13 | | |
| November 11 | at Lafayette | Fisher Field; Easton, PA | W 13–6 | 12,000 | |
| November 18 | Springfield | Rutgers Stadium; Piscataway, NJ | W 17–7 | | |
| November 30 | at Brown | Brown Stadium; Providence, RI | L 0–13 | | |
