= 1939 Boston University Terriers football team =

American college football season

1939 Boston University Terriers football
- Conference: Independent
- Record: 5–3
- Head coach: Pat Hanley (6th season)
- Home stadium: Fenway Park, Braves Field

1939 Eastern college football independents records
	Conf.			Overall
Team	W	L	T	W		L		T
No. 4 Cornell		–		8	–	0	–	0
No. 10 Duquesne		–		8	–	0	–	1
Swarthmore		–		6	–	0	–	1
Scranton		–		7	–	0	–	2
Princeton		–		7	–	1	–	0
La Salle		–		6	–	1	–	1
Penn State		–		5	–	1	–	2
No. 11 Boston College		–		9	–	2	–	0
No. 17 Fordham		–		6	–	2	–	0
Villanova		–		6	–	2	–	0
Boston University		–		5	–	3	–	0
Brown		–		5	–	3	–	1
Dartmouth		–		5	–	3	–	1
Hofstra		–		4	–	3	–	0
NYU		–		5	–	4	–	0
Pittsburgh		–		5	–	4	–	0
Harvard		–		4	–	4	–	0
Manhattan		–		4	–	4	–	0
Penn		–		4	–	4	–	0
Syracuse		–		3	–	3	–	2
Vermont		–		3	–	3	–	2
Tufts		–		3	–	4	–	1
Yale		–		3	–	4	–	1
Army		–		3	–	4	–	2
Bucknell		–		3	–	5	–	0
Carnegie Tech		–		3	–	5	–	0
Providence		–		3	–	5	–	0
Columbia		–		2	–	4	–	2
Massachusetts State		–		2	–	5	–	2
Colgate		–		2	–	5	–	1
Temple		–		2	–	7	–	0
CCNY		–		1	–	7	–	0
Buffalo		–		0	–	7	–	0
Rankings from AP Poll

The 1939 Boston University Terriers football team was an American football team that represented Boston University as an independent during the 1939 college football season. In its sixth season under head coach Pat Hanley, the team compiled a 5–3 record and was outscored by a total of 80 to 77.

Boston University was ranked at No. 174 (out of 609 teams) in the final Litkenhous Ratings for 1939.

== Schedule ==
Date	Time	Opponent	Site	Result	Attendance	Source
October 7	2:00 p.m.	Franklin & Marshall	Fenway Park; Boston, MA	W 19–7		
October 14		Western Reserve	Fenway Park; Boston, MA	L 14–19	7,000	
October 21		Upsala	National League Field; Boston, MA	W 13–3		
October 27		at Western Maryland	Memorial Stadium; Baltimore, MD	W 6–0		
November 4		Manhattan	Braves Field; Boston, MA	L 0–26	5,000	
November 11		at Cincinnati	Nippert Stadium; Cincinnati, OH	W 13–6	7,000	
November 18		vs. Boston College	Fenway Park; Boston, MA (rivalry)	L 0–19	14,000	
December 1	8:00 p.m.	at Tampa	Philips Field; Tampa, FL	W 12–0	4,000	
All times are in Eastern time
