= 1939 Colgate Red Raiders football team =

American college football season

1939 Colgate Red Raiders football
- Conference: Independent
- Record: 2–5–1
- Head coach: Andrew Kerr (11th season)
- Captain: Ernest Neill
- Home stadium: Colgate Athletic Field

1939 Eastern college football independents records
	Conf.			Overall
Team	W	L	T	W		L		T
No. 4 Cornell		–		8	–	0	–	0
No. 10 Duquesne		–		8	–	0	–	1
Swarthmore		–		6	–	0	–	1
Scranton		–		7	–	0	–	2
Princeton		–		7	–	1	–	0
La Salle		–		6	–	1	–	1
Penn State		–		5	–	1	–	2
No. 11 Boston College		–		9	–	2	–	0
No. 17 Fordham		–		6	–	2	–	0
Villanova		–		6	–	2	–	0
Boston University		–		5	–	3	–	0
Brown		–		5	–	3	–	1
Dartmouth		–		5	–	3	–	1
Hofstra		–		4	–	3	–	0
NYU		–		5	–	4	–	0
Pittsburgh		–		5	–	4	–	0
Harvard		–		4	–	4	–	0
Manhattan		–		4	–	4	–	0
Penn		–		4	–	4	–	0
Syracuse		–		3	–	3	–	2
Vermont		–		3	–	3	–	2
Tufts		–		3	–	4	–	1
Yale		–		3	–	4	–	1
Army		–		3	–	4	–	2
Bucknell		–		3	–	5	–	0
Carnegie Tech		–		3	–	5	–	0
Providence		–		3	–	5	–	0
Columbia		–		2	–	4	–	2
Massachusetts State		–		2	–	5	–	2
Colgate		–		2	–	5	–	1
Temple		–		2	–	7	–	0
CCNY		–		1	–	7	–	0
Buffalo		–		0	–	7	–	0
Rankings from AP Poll

The 1939 Colgate Red Raiders football team was an American football team that represented Colgate University as an independent during the 1939 college football season. In its 11th season under head coach Andrew Kerr, the team compiled a 2–5–1 record and was outscored by a total of 92 to 66. Ernest Neill was the team captain.

Colgate was ranked at No. 58 (out of 609 teams) in the final Litkenhous Ratings for 1939.

The team played its home games at the newly-constructed Colgate Athletic Field, later renamed Andy Kerr Stadium, in Hamilton, New York. The first game at the new facility was played against NYU on September 30, 1939. Colgate's first victory at the new stadium was on October 14, 1939, against Brown.

== Schedule ==
Date	Opponent	Site	Result	Attendance	Source
September 30	NYU	Colgate Athletic Field; Hamilton, NY	L 6–7	8,000	
October 7	at Duke	Duke Stadium; Durham, NC	L 0–37	20,000	
October 14	Brown	Colgate Athletic Field; Hamilton, NY	W 10–0	8,500	
October 21	St. Lawrence	Colgate Athletic Field; Hamilton, NY	W 31–0	9,000	
October 28	at Holy Cross	Fitton Field; Worcester, MA	L 7–27	15,000	
November 11	at No. 5 Cornell	Schoellkopf Field; Ithaca, NY (rivalry)	L 12–14	15,000	
November 18	at Syracuse	Archbold Stadium; Syracuse, NY (rivalry)	L 0–7	28,000	
November 25	at Columbia	Baker Field; New York, NY	T 0–0	20,000	
Rankings from AP Poll released prior to the game
