= 1939 Connecticut Huskies football team =

American college football season

1939 Connecticut Huskies football
- Conference: New England Conference
- Record: 5–3 (1–1 New England)
- Head coach: J. Orlean Christian (6th season)
- Home stadium: Gardner Dow Athletic Fields

1939 New England Conference football standings
	Conf.					Overall
Team	W		L		T	W		L		T
Maine $	3	–	0	–	0	5	–	2	–	0
Connecticut	1	–	1	–	0	5	–	3	–	0
New Hampshire	1	–	1	–	0	3	–	5	–	0
Rhode Island State	1	–	2	–	0	3	–	4	–	1
Northeastern	0	–	2	–	0	0	–	6	–	1
$ – Conference champion

The 1939 Connecticut Huskies football team represented the University of Connecticut in the 1939 college football season. The Huskies were led by sixth-year head coach J. Orlean Christian and completed the season with a record of 5–3.

== Schedule ==
Date	Opponent	Site	Result	Attendance	Source
September 30	Coast Guard*	Gardner Dow Athletic Fields; Storrs, CT	W 14–0		
October 7	at Wesleyan*	Andrus Field; Middletown, CT	L 6–9		
October 14	at Massachusetts State*	Alumni Field; Amherst, MA (rivalry)	W 7–6		
October 21	Maine	Gardner Dow Athletic Fields; Storrs, CT	L 7–20	4,000	
October 28	at Buffalo*	Rotary Field; Buffalo, NY	W 25–7		
November 4	Lowell Textile*	Gardner Dow Athletic Fields; Storrs, CT	W 20–0		
November 11	at Rhode Island State	Meade Stadium; Kingston, RI (rivalry)	W 20–14		
November 18	at Brown*	Brown Stadium; Providence, RI	L 0–47	3,000	
*Non-conference game
