= 1939 Massachusetts State Aggies football team =

American college football season

1939 Massachusetts State Aggies football
- Conference: Independent
- Record: 2–5–2
- Head coach: Elbert Carraway (4th season)
- Home stadium: Alumni Field

1939 Eastern college football independents records
	Conf.			Overall
Team	W	L	T	W		L		T
No. 4 Cornell		–		8	–	0	–	0
No. 10 Duquesne		–		8	–	0	–	1
Swarthmore		–		6	–	0	–	1
Scranton		–		7	–	0	–	2
Princeton		–		7	–	1	–	0
La Salle		–		6	–	1	–	1
Penn State		–		5	–	1	–	2
No. 11 Boston College		–		9	–	2	–	0
No. 17 Fordham		–		6	–	2	–	0
Villanova		–		6	–	2	–	0
Boston University		–		5	–	3	–	0
Brown		–		5	–	3	–	1
Dartmouth		–		5	–	3	–	1
Hofstra		–		4	–	3	–	0
NYU		–		5	–	4	–	0
Pittsburgh		–		5	–	4	–	0
Harvard		–		4	–	4	–	0
Manhattan		–		4	–	4	–	0
Penn		–		4	–	4	–	0
Syracuse		–		3	–	3	–	2
Vermont		–		3	–	3	–	2
Tufts		–		3	–	4	–	1
Yale		–		3	–	4	–	1
Army		–		3	–	4	–	2
Bucknell		–		3	–	5	–	0
Carnegie Tech		–		3	–	5	–	0
Providence		–		3	–	5	–	0
Columbia		–		2	–	4	–	2
Massachusetts State		–		2	–	5	–	2
Colgate		–		2	–	5	–	1
Temple		–		2	–	7	–	0
CCNY		–		1	–	7	–	0
Buffalo		–		0	–	7	–	0
Rankings from AP Poll

The 1939 Massachusetts State Aggies football team represented Massachusetts State College in the 1939 college football season. The team was coached by Elbert Carraway and played its home games at Alumni Field in Amherst, Massachusetts. Mass State finished the season with a record of 2–5–2.

Massachusetts State was ranked at No. 315 (out of 609 teams) in the final Litkenhous Ratings for 1939.

== Schedule ==
Date	Opponent	Site	Result	Attendance	Source
September 29	at Springfield	Springfield, MA	T 0–0		
October 7	Bowdoin	Alumni Field; Amherst, MA	L 14–19		
October 14	Connecticut	Alumni Field; Amherst, MA (rivalry)	L 6–7		
October 21	at Rhode Island State	Meade Stadium; Kingston, RI	L 20–23	2,000	
October 28	at Worcester Tech	Alumni Field; Worcester, MA	W 7–0		
November 4	Amherst	Alumni Field; Amherst, MA	L 0–13		
November 11	at Coast Guard	Cadet Memorial Field; New London, CT	W 6–0		
November 18	RPI	Alumni Field; Amherst, MA	T 7–7		
November 25	Tufts	Alumni Field; Amherst, MA	L 7–34		

== See also ==
- Texas A&M University
