= 1939 Maine Black Bears football team =

American college football season

1939 Maine Black Bears football

New England champion
- Conference: New England Conference, Maine Intercollegiate Athletic Association
- Record: 5–2 (3–0 New England, 1–2 MIAA)
- Head coach: Fred Brice (19th season)
- Captain: Richard Dyer
- Home stadium: Alumni Field

1939 New England Conference football standings
	Conf.					Overall
Team	W		L		T	W		L		T
Maine $	3	–	0	–	0	5	–	2	–	0
Connecticut	1	–	1	–	0	5	–	3	–	0
New Hampshire	1	–	1	–	0	3	–	5	–	0
Rhode Island State	1	–	2	–	0	3	–	4	–	1
Northeastern	0	–	2	–	0	0	–	6	–	1
$ – Conference champion

The 1939 Maine Black Bears football team was an American football team that represented the University of Maine as a member of the New England Conference and Maine Intercollegiate Athletic Association during the 1939 college football season. In its 19th season under head coach Fred Brice, the team compiled a 5–2 record (3–0 against New England conference and 1–2 against MIAA opponents) and won the New England conference championship. The team played its home games at Alumni Field in Orono, Maine. Richard Dyer was the team captain.

== Schedule ==
Date	Opponent	Site	Result	Attendance	Source
September 30	Arnold*	Alumni Field; Orono, ME	W 47–0		
October 7	Rhode Island State	Alumni Field; Orono ME	W 14–0		
October 14	New Hampshire	Alumni Field; Orono, ME (rivalry)	W 6–0		
October 21	at Connecticut	Gardner Dow Athletic Fields; Storrs, CT	W 20–7	4,000	
October 28	at Bates	Garcelon Field; Lewiston, ME	L 0–6		
November 4	at Colby	Seaverns Field; Waterville, ME	L 6–7		
November 11	Bowdoin	Alumni Field; Orono, ME	W 12–6	11,000	
*Non-conference game
