= 1939 Boston College Eagles football team =

American college football season

1939 Boston College Eagles football

Cotton Bowl Classic, L 3–6 vs. Clemson
- Conference: Independent

Ranking
- AP: No. 11
- Record: 9–2
- Head coach: Frank Leahy (1st season)
- Captain: Ernie Schwotzer
- Home stadium: Alumni Field, Fenway Park

1939 Eastern college football independents records
	Conf.			Overall
Team	W	L	T	W		L		T
No. 4 Cornell		–		8	–	0	–	0
No. 10 Duquesne		–		8	–	0	–	1
Swarthmore		–		6	–	0	–	1
Scranton		–		7	–	0	–	2
Princeton		–		7	–	1	–	0
La Salle		–		6	–	1	–	1
Penn State		–		5	–	1	–	2
No. 11 Boston College		–		9	–	2	–	0
No. 17 Fordham		–		6	–	2	–	0
Villanova		–		6	–	2	–	0
Boston University		–		5	–	3	–	0
Brown		–		5	–	3	–	1
Dartmouth		–		5	–	3	–	1
Hofstra		–		4	–	3	–	0
NYU		–		5	–	4	–	0
Pittsburgh		–		5	–	4	–	0
Harvard		–		4	–	4	–	0
Manhattan		–		4	–	4	–	0
Penn		–		4	–	4	–	0
Syracuse		–		3	–	3	–	2
Vermont		–		3	–	3	–	2
Tufts		–		3	–	4	–	1
Yale		–		3	–	4	–	1
Army		–		3	–	4	–	2
Bucknell		–		3	–	5	–	0
Carnegie Tech		–		3	–	5	–	0
Providence		–		3	–	5	–	0
Columbia		–		2	–	4	–	2
Massachusetts State		–		2	–	5	–	2
Colgate		–		2	–	5	–	1
Temple		–		2	–	7	–	0
CCNY		–		1	–	7	–	0
Buffalo		–		0	–	7	–	0
Rankings from AP Poll

The 1939 Boston College Eagles football team represented Boston College during the 1939 college football season. The Eagles were led by first-year head coach Frank Leahy and played their home games at Alumni Field in Chestnut Hill, Massachusetts and Fenway Park in Boston. The team finished the regular season with a 9–1 record, and the Eagles were ranked in the final AP Poll for the first time in school history, at 11th. They were invited to the school's first bowl game, the 1940 Cotton Bowl, where they were defeated by Clemson.

== Schedule ==
Date	Time	Opponent	Rank	Site	Result	Attendance	Source
September 30		Lebanon Valley		Alumni Field; Chestnut Hill, MA	W 45–0	16,000	
October 6		Saint Joseph's		Alumni Field; Chestnut Hill, MA	W 20–6	22,685	
October 12		Florida		Fenway Park; Boston, MA	L 0–7	18,000	
October 21	2:30 p.m.	Temple		Fenway Park; Boston, MA	W 19–0	13,300	
October 28		Saint Anselm		Alumni Field; Chestnut Hill, MA	W 28–0		
November 4		Auburn		Fenway Park; Boston, MA	W 13–7	14,000–15,000	
November 11		at Detroit		University of Detroit Stadium; Detroit, MI	W 20–13	10,342	
November 18		vs. Boston University		Fenway Park; Boston, MA (rivalry)	W 19–0	13,000	
November 25		Kansas State		Fenway Park; Boston, MA	W 38–7	11,000	
December 2		vs. No. 10 Holy Cross		Fenway Park; Boston, MA (rivalry)	W 14–0	40,000	
January 1, 1940		vs. No. 12 Clemson	No. 11	Cotton Bowl; Dallas, TX (Cotton Bowl, rivalry)	L 3–6	15,000	
Rankings from AP Poll released prior to the game; All times are in Eastern time

== See also ==
- Lou Montgomery, halfback on the team who did not play in the bowl game due to racial policies of the era
