= 1939 Temple Owls football team =

American college football season

1939 Temple Owls football
- Conference: Independent
- Record: 2–7
- Head coach: Fred H. Swan (1st season)
- Captain: Edward Kolman
- Home stadium: Temple Stadium

1939 Eastern college football independents records
| | Conf. | | | Overall |
| Team | W | L | T | W | | L | | T |
|---|---|---|---|---|---|---|---|---|
| No. 4 Cornell | | – | | 8 | – | 0 | – | 0 |
| No. 10 Duquesne | | – | | 8 | – | 0 | – | 1 |
| Swarthmore | | – | | 6 | – | 0 | – | 1 |
| Scranton | | – | | 7 | – | 0 | – | 2 |
| Princeton | | – | | 7 | – | 1 | – | 0 |
| La Salle | | – | | 6 | – | 1 | – | 1 |
| Penn State | | – | | 5 | – | 1 | – | 2 |
| No. 11 Boston College | | – | | 9 | – | 2 | – | 0 |
| No. 17 Fordham | | – | | 6 | – | 2 | – | 0 |
| Villanova | | – | | 6 | – | 2 | – | 0 |
| Boston University | | – | | 5 | – | 3 | – | 0 |
| Brown | | – | | 5 | – | 3 | – | 1 |
| Dartmouth | | – | | 5 | – | 3 | – | 1 |
| Hofstra | | – | | 4 | – | 3 | – | 0 |
| NYU | | – | | 5 | – | 4 | – | 0 |
| Pittsburgh | | – | | 5 | – | 4 | – | 0 |
| Harvard | | – | | 4 | – | 4 | – | 0 |
| Manhattan | | – | | 4 | – | 4 | – | 0 |
| Penn | | – | | 4 | – | 4 | – | 0 |
| Syracuse | | – | | 3 | – | 3 | – | 2 |
| Vermont | | – | | 3 | – | 3 | – | 2 |
| Tufts | | – | | 3 | – | 4 | – | 1 |
| Yale | | – | | 3 | – | 4 | – | 1 |
| Army | | – | | 3 | – | 4 | – | 2 |
| Bucknell | | – | | 3 | – | 5 | – | 0 |
| Carnegie Tech | | – | | 3 | – | 5 | – | 0 |
| Providence | | – | | 3 | – | 5 | – | 0 |
| Columbia | | – | | 2 | – | 4 | – | 2 |
| Massachusetts State | | – | | 2 | – | 5 | – | 2 |
| Colgate | | – | | 2 | – | 5 | – | 1 |
| Temple | | – | | 2 | – | 7 | – | 0 |
| CCNY | | – | | 1 | – | 7 | – | 0 |
| Buffalo | | – | | 0 | – | 7 | – | 0 |
Rankings from AP Poll

The 1939 Temple Owls football team was an American football team that represented Temple University as an independent during the 1939 college football season. In its first and only season under head coach Fred H. Swan, the team compiled a 2–7 record and was outscored by a total of 96 to 51. Edward Kolman was the team captain.

Temple was ranked at No. 71 (out of 609 teams) in the final Litkenhous Ratings for 1939.

The team played its home games at Temple Stadium in Philadelphia.

== Schedule ==
| Date | Time | Opponent | Site | Result | Attendance | Source |
|---|---|---|---|---|---|---|
| September 29 | | Georgetown | Temple Stadium; Philadelphia, PA | L 2–3 | 15,000 | |
| October 7 | | Carnegie Tech | Temple Stadium; Philadelphia, PA | L 0–6 | | |
| October 14 | | TCU | Temple Stadium; Philadelphia, PA | W 13–11 | | |
| October 21 | 2:30 p.m. | at Boston College | Fenway Park; Boston, MA | L 0–19 | 13,300 | |
| October 27 | | Bucknell | Temple Stadium; Philadelphia, PA | W 16–0 | 10,000 | |
| November 4 | | Pittsburgh | Temple Stadium; Philadelphia, PA | L 7–13 | 18,000 | |
| November 11 | | at Holy Cross | Fitton Field; Worcester, MA | L 0–14 | 15,000 | |
| November 18 | | Villanova | Temple Stadium; Philadelphia, PA | L 6–20 | | |
| November 25 | | at Michigan State | Macklin Field; East Lansing, MI | L 7–18 | 8,500 | |
All times are in Eastern time
