= 1939 Vermont Catamounts football team =

American college football season

1939 Vermont Catamounts football
- Conference: Independent
- Record: 3–3–2
- Head coach: John P. Sabo (6th season)
- Home stadium: Centennial Field

1939 Eastern college football independents records
	Conf.			Overall
Team	W	L	T	W		L		T
No. 4 Cornell		–		8	–	0	–	0
No. 10 Duquesne		–		8	–	0	–	1
Swarthmore		–		6	–	0	–	1
Scranton		–		7	–	0	–	2
Princeton		–		7	–	1	–	0
La Salle		–		6	–	1	–	1
Penn State		–		5	–	1	–	2
No. 11 Boston College		–		9	–	2	–	0
No. 17 Fordham		–		6	–	2	–	0
Villanova		–		6	–	2	–	0
Boston University		–		5	–	3	–	0
Brown		–		5	–	3	–	1
Dartmouth		–		5	–	3	–	1
Hofstra		–		4	–	3	–	0
NYU		–		5	–	4	–	0
Pittsburgh		–		5	–	4	–	0
Harvard		–		4	–	4	–	0
Manhattan		–		4	–	4	–	0
Penn		–		4	–	4	–	0
Syracuse		–		3	–	3	–	2
Vermont		–		3	–	3	–	2
Tufts		–		3	–	4	–	1
Yale		–		3	–	4	–	1
Army		–		3	–	4	–	2
Bucknell		–		3	–	5	–	0
Carnegie Tech		–		3	–	5	–	0
Providence		–		3	–	5	–	0
Columbia		–		2	–	4	–	2
Massachusetts State		–		2	–	5	–	2
Colgate		–		2	–	5	–	1
Temple		–		2	–	7	–	0
CCNY		–		1	–	7	–	0
Buffalo		–		0	–	7	–	0
Rankings from AP Poll

The 1939 Vermont Catamounts football team was an American football team that represented the University of Vermont as an independent during the 1939 college football season. In their sixth year under head coach John P. Sabo, the team compiled a 3–3–2 record.

Vermont was ranked at No. 273 (out of 609 teams) in the final Litkenhous Ratings for 1939.

== Schedule ==
Date	Opponent	Site	Result	Attendance	Source
September 30	at Amherst	Pratt Field; Amherst, MA	W 7–6		
October 7	St. Lawrence	Centennial Field; Burlington, VT	W 12–0		
October 14	at Colby	Seaverns Field; Waterville, ME	T 0–0		
October 21	Union (NY)	Centennial Field; Burlington, VT	L 6–19	4,000	
October 28	at New Hampshire	Lewis Field; Durham, NH	L 7–22	6,000	
November 4	RPI	Centennial Field; Burlington, VT	L 6–13		
November 11	at Norwich	Sabine Field; Northfield, VT	T 0–0	3,000	
November 18	Middlebury	Centennial Field; Burlington, VT	W 21–0		
