= 1939 Northeastern Huskies football team =

American college football season

1939 Northeastern Huskies football
- Conference: New England Conference
- Record: 0–6–1 (0–2 New England)
- Head coach: James W. Dunn (3rd season)
- Captain: Cornelius Sullivan
- Home stadium: Kent Street Field

1939 New England Conference football standings
	Conf.					Overall
Team	W		L		T	W		L		T
Maine $	3	–	0	–	0	5	–	2	–	0
Connecticut	1	–	1	–	0	5	–	3	–	0
New Hampshire	1	–	1	–	0	3	–	5	–	0
Rhode Island State	1	–	2	–	0	3	–	4	–	1
Northeastern	0	–	2	–	0	0	–	6	–	1
$ – Conference champion

The 1939 Northeastern Huskies football team represented Northeastern University during the 1939 college football season. It was the program's seventh season and they finished with a winless record of 0–6–1 (0–2 in New England Conference play). Their head coach was James W. Dunn serving in his third season, and their captain was Cornelius Sullivan.

== Schedule ==
Date	Time	Opponent	Site	Result	Attendance	Source
September 30		Saint Anselm*	Kent Street Field; Brookline, MA	L 7–36		
October 7		at New Hampshire	Wildcat Stadium; Durham, NH	L 6–15		
October 14		at Bates*	Lewiston, ME	L 7–10		
October 21	2:00 p.m.	at Tufts*	Medford, MA	T 0–0		
October 28		Rhode Island	Kent Street Field; Brookline, MA	L 6–7	4,500	
November 4		Springfield*	Kent Street Field; Brookline, MA	L 13–19		
November 11		at Upsala*	East Orange, NJ	L 13–22		
*Non-conference game; All times are in Eastern time
