= 1939 Rhode Island State Rams football team =

American college football season

1939 Rhode Island State Rams football
- Conference: New England Conference
- Record: 3–4–1 (1–2 New England)
- Head coach: Frank Keaney (20th season)
- Home stadium: Meade Stadium

1939 New England Conference football standings
	Conf.					Overall
Team	W		L		T	W		L		T
Maine $	3	–	0	–	0	5	–	2	–	0
Connecticut	1	–	1	–	0	5	–	3	–	0
New Hampshire	1	–	1	–	0	3	–	5	–	0
Rhode Island State	1	–	2	–	0	3	–	4	–	1
Northeastern	0	–	2	–	0	0	–	6	–	1
$ – Conference champion

The 1939 Rhode Island Rams football team was an American football team that represented Rhode Island State College (later renamed the University of Rhode Island) as a member of the New England Conference during the 1939 college football season. In its 20th season under head coach Frank Keaney, the team compiled a 3–4–1 record (1–2 against conference opponents) and finished in fourth place in the conference.

Rhode Island State was ranked at No. 318 (out of 609 teams) in the final Litkenhous Ratings for 1939.

The team played its home games at Meade Stadium in Kingston, Rhode Island.

== Schedule ==
Date	Opponent	Site	Result	Attendance	Source
September 22	at Providence*	Cranston Stadium; Providence, RI	L 0–6		
September 30	at Brown*	Brown Stadium; Providence, RI (rivalry)	L 0–34	10,000	
October 7	at Maine	Alumni Field; Orono, ME	L 0–14		
October 14	Brooklyn*	Meade Stadium; Kingston, RI	W 40–0		
October 21	Massachusetts State*	Meade Stadium; Kingston, RI	W 23–20	2,000	
October 28	at Northeastern	Huntington Field; Brookline, MA	W 7–6	4,500	
November 4	at Worcester Tech*	Alumni Field; Worcester, MA	T 7–7	3,000	
November 11	Connecticut^{†}	Meade Stadium; Kingston, RI (rivalry)	L 14–20		
*Non-conference game; ^{†}Homecoming
