= 1939 Buffalo Bulls football team =

American college football season

1939 Buffalo Bulls football
- Conference: Independent
- Record: 0–7
- Head coach: Jim Peele (4th season)
- Captains: Gene Nuwer; Al Collins
- Home stadium: Rotary Field

1939 Eastern college football independents records
	Conf.			Overall
Team	W	L	T	W		L		T
No. 4 Cornell		–		8	–	0	–	0
No. 10 Duquesne		–		8	–	0	–	1
Swarthmore		–		6	–	0	–	1
Scranton		–		7	–	0	–	2
Princeton		–		7	–	1	–	0
La Salle		–		6	–	1	–	1
Penn State		–		5	–	1	–	2
No. 11 Boston College		–		9	–	2	–	0
No. 17 Fordham		–		6	–	2	–	0
Villanova		–		6	–	2	–	0
Boston University		–		5	–	3	–	0
Brown		–		5	–	3	–	1
Dartmouth		–		5	–	3	–	1
Hofstra		–		4	–	3	–	0
NYU		–		5	–	4	–	0
Pittsburgh		–		5	–	4	–	0
Harvard		–		4	–	4	–	0
Manhattan		–		4	–	4	–	0
Penn		–		4	–	4	–	0
Syracuse		–		3	–	3	–	2
Vermont		–		3	–	3	–	2
Tufts		–		3	–	4	–	1
Yale		–		3	–	4	–	1
Army		–		3	–	4	–	2
Bucknell		–		3	–	5	–	0
Carnegie Tech		–		3	–	5	–	0
Providence		–		3	–	5	–	0
Columbia		–		2	–	4	–	2
Massachusetts State		–		2	–	5	–	2
Colgate		–		2	–	5	–	1
Temple		–		2	–	7	–	0
CCNY		–		1	–	7	–	0
Buffalo		–		0	–	7	–	0
Rankings from AP Poll

The 1939 Buffalo Bulls football team was an American football team that represented the University of Buffalo as an independent during the 1939 college football season. In its fourth season under head coach Jim Peele, the team compiled a 0–7 record. The team played its home games at Rotary Field in Buffalo, New York.

Buffalo was ranked at No. 529 in the final Litkenhous Ratings for 1939.

== Schedule ==
Date	Opponent	Site	Result	Attendance	Source
September 30	Susquehanna	Rotary Field; Buffalo, NY	L 0–6		
October 7	CCNY	Rotary Field; Buffalo, NY	L 0–19		
October 14	Alfred	Rotary Field; Buffalo, NY	L 0–14		
October 21	at Lehigh	Taylor Stadium; Bethlehem, PA	L 0–22	5,000	
October 28	Connecticut	Rotary Field; Buffalo, NY	L 7–25		
November 11	at Hobart	Geneva, NY	L 0–20		
November 18	at Wayne	Keyworth Stadium; Hamtramck, MI	L 0–20	4,500	
