= 1939 New Hampshire Wildcats football team =

American college football season

1939 New Hampshire Wildcats football
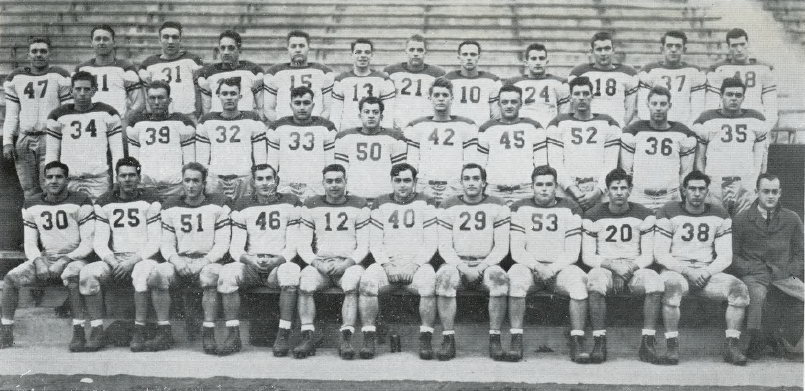
- Conference: New England Conference
- Record: 3–5 (1–1 New England)
- Head coach: George Sauer (3rd season)
- Captain: Burton Mitchell
- Home stadium: Lewis Field

1939 New England Conference football standings
	Conf.					Overall
Team	W		L		T	W		L		T
Maine $	3	–	0	–	0	5	–	2	–	0
Connecticut	1	–	1	–	0	5	–	3	–	0
New Hampshire	1	–	1	–	0	3	–	5	–	0
Rhode Island State	1	–	2	–	0	3	–	4	–	1
Northeastern	0	–	2	–	0	0	–	6	–	1
$ – Conference champion

The 1939 New Hampshire Wildcats football team was an American football team that represented the University of New Hampshire as a member of the New England Conference during the 1939 college football season. In its third year under head coach George Sauer, the team compiled a 3–5 record, being outscored by their opponents 126–71.

New Hampshire was ranked at No. 260 (out of 609 teams) in the final Litkenhous Ratings for 1939.

The team played its home games at Lewis Field (also known as Lewis Stadium) in Durham, New Hampshire.

== Schedule ==
Date	Opponent	Site	Result	Attendance	Source
September 30	Colby*	Lewis Field; Durham, NH	L 6–20		
October 7	Northeastern	Lewis Field; Durham, NH	W 15–6		
October 14	at Maine	Alumni Field; Orono, ME (rivalry)	L 0–6		
October 20	at Springfield*	Pratt Field; Springfield, MA	L 2–3		
October 28	Vermont*	Lewis Field; Durham, NH	W 22–7	6,000	
November 4	at Rutgers*	Rutgers Stadium; New Brunswick, NJ	L 13–32		
November 11	Tufts*^{†}	Lewis Field; Durham, NH	W 13–6	6,000	
November 18	at Harvard*	Harvard Stadium; Boston, MA	L 0–46	15,000	
*Non-conference game; ^{†}Homecoming; Source:

The Harvard team was captained by "Torby" Macdonald, roommate of John F. Kennedy, who would go on serve in the United States House of Representatives from 1955 to 1976. The 1939 game remains the last time that the Harvard and New Hampshire football programs have met.

New Hampshire captain Burton Mitchell was inducted to the university's athletic hall of fame in 1998.
