= 1939 Carnegie Tech Tartans football team =

American college football season

1939 Carnegie Tech Tartans football
- Conference: Independent
- Record: 3–5
- Head coach: Bill Kern (3rd season)
- Home stadium: Pitt Stadium

1939 Eastern college football independents records
	Conf.			Overall
Team	W	L	T	W		L		T
No. 4 Cornell		–		8	–	0	–	0
No. 10 Duquesne		–		8	–	0	–	1
Swarthmore		–		6	–	0	–	1
Scranton		–		7	–	0	–	2
Princeton		–		7	–	1	–	0
La Salle		–		6	–	1	–	1
Penn State		–		5	–	1	–	2
No. 11 Boston College		–		9	–	2	–	0
No. 17 Fordham		–		6	–	2	–	0
Villanova		–		6	–	2	–	0
Boston University		–		5	–	3	–	0
Brown		–		5	–	3	–	1
Dartmouth		–		5	–	3	–	1
Hofstra		–		4	–	3	–	0
NYU		–		5	–	4	–	0
Pittsburgh		–		5	–	4	–	0
Harvard		–		4	–	4	–	0
Manhattan		–		4	–	4	–	0
Penn		–		4	–	4	–	0
Syracuse		–		3	–	3	–	2
Vermont		–		3	–	3	–	2
Tufts		–		3	–	4	–	1
Yale		–		3	–	4	–	1
Army		–		3	–	4	–	2
Bucknell		–		3	–	5	–	0
Carnegie Tech		–		3	–	5	–	0
Providence		–		3	–	5	–	0
Columbia		–		2	–	4	–	2
Massachusetts State		–		2	–	5	–	2
Colgate		–		2	–	5	–	1
Temple		–		2	–	7	–	0
CCNY		–		1	–	7	–	0
Buffalo		–		0	–	7	–	0
Rankings from AP Poll

The 1939 Carnegie Tech Tartans football team represented the Carnegie Institute of Technology—now known as Carnegie Mellon University—as an independent during the 1939 college football season. Led by Bill Kern in his third and final season as head coach, the Tartans compiled a record of 3–5.

Carnegie Tech was ranked at No. 55 (out of 609 teams) in the final Litkenhous Ratings for 1939.

Carnegie Tech played home games at Pitt Stadium in Pittsburgh.

== Schedule ==
Date	Opponent	Rank	Site	Result	Attendance	Source
September 30	at Wittenberg		Springfield, OH	W 35–0		
October 7	at Temple		Temple Stadium; Philadelphia, PA	W 6–0		
October 14	at Case		Shaw Stadium; Cleveland, OH	W 21–0		
October 21	at NYU	No. 15	Yankee Stadium; Bronx, NY	L 0–6	25,000	
October 28	No. 2 Notre Dame		Pitt Stadium; Pittsburgh, PA	L 6–7	61,420	
November 11	Pittsburgh		Pitt Stadium; Pittsburgh, PA	L 0–6	55,000	
November 18	at No. 18 Holy Cross		Fitton Field; Worcester, MA	L 0–21	30,000	
November 25	No. 12 Duquesne		Pitt Stadium; Pittsburgh, PA	L 7–22	37,500	
Rankings from AP Poll released prior to the game
