= 1939 CCNY Beavers football team =

American college football season

1939 CCNY Beavers football
- Conference: Independent
- Record: 1–7
- Head coach: Benny Friedman (6th season)
- Home stadium: Lewisohn Stadium

1939 Eastern college football independents records
	Conf.			Overall
Team	W	L	T	W		L		T
No. 4 Cornell		–		8	–	0	–	0
No. 10 Duquesne		–		8	–	0	–	1
Swarthmore		–		6	–	0	–	1
Scranton		–		7	–	0	–	2
Princeton		–		7	–	1	–	0
La Salle		–		6	–	1	–	1
Penn State		–		5	–	1	–	2
No. 11 Boston College		–		9	–	2	–	0
No. 17 Fordham		–		6	–	2	–	0
Villanova		–		6	–	2	–	0
Boston University		–		5	–	3	–	0
Brown		–		5	–	3	–	1
Dartmouth		–		5	–	3	–	1
Hofstra		–		4	–	3	–	0
NYU		–		5	–	4	–	0
Pittsburgh		–		5	–	4	–	0
Harvard		–		4	–	4	–	0
Manhattan		–		4	–	4	–	0
Penn		–		4	–	4	–	0
Syracuse		–		3	–	3	–	2
Vermont		–		3	–	3	–	2
Tufts		–		3	–	4	–	1
Yale		–		3	–	4	–	1
Army		–		3	–	4	–	2
Bucknell		–		3	–	5	–	0
Carnegie Tech		–		3	–	5	–	0
Providence		–		3	–	5	–	0
Columbia		–		2	–	4	–	2
Massachusetts State		–		2	–	5	–	2
Colgate		–		2	–	5	–	1
Temple		–		2	–	7	–	0
CCNY		–		1	–	7	–	0
Buffalo		–		0	–	7	–	0
Rankings from AP Poll

The 1939 CCNY Beavers football team was an American football team that represented the City College of New York (CCNY) as an independent during the 1939 college football season. In their sixth season under head coach Benny Friedman, the team compiled a 1–7 record.

== Schedule ==
Date	Opponent	Site	Result	Attendance	Source
September 29	at LIU	Ebbets Field; Brooklyn, NY	L 0–20	7,000	
October 7	at Buffalo	Rotary Field; Buffalo, NY	W 19–0		
October 14	Scranton	Lewisohn Stadium; New York, NY	L 0–31	3,500	
October 21	at Susquehanna	Selinsgrove, PA	L 6–14		
October 28	at Lowell Textile	Lowell, MA	L 0–7		
November 4	Brooklyn	Lewisohn Stadium; New York, NY	L 6–12	4,000	
November 11	at Springfield	Pratt Field; Springfield, MA	L 0–26	1,500	
November 18	Saint Joseph's	Lewisohn Stadium; New York, NY	L 13–20		
