= George Gonda =

American football player (1919–)

- Gonda, circa 1941

No. 30
- Position: Halfback

Personal information
- Born: February 23, 1919; Grindstone, Pennsylvania, U.S.
- Died: September 19, 1994 (aged 75); Woodville, Mississippi, U.S.
- Listed height: 5 ft 10 in (1.78 m)
- Listed weight: 175 lb (79 kg)

Career information
- High school: Redstone Township (Republic, Pennsylvania)
- College: Duquesne (1938–1941)
- NFL draft: 1942: undrafted

Career history
- Pittsburgh Steelers (1942); Richmond Rebels (1946)
- Stats at Pro Football Reference

George John Gonda (February 23, 1919 – September 19, 1994) was an American professional football halfback who played for the Pittsburgh Steelers of the National Football League (NFL). He played college football for the Duquesne Dukes.

== Early life ==
George John Gonda was born on February 23, 1919, in Grindstone, Pennsylvania. He played high school football and baseball at Redstone Township High School in Republic, Pennsylvania. Redstone was eliminated from the WPIAL baseball playoffs in 1938 after Gonda gave up nine walks in a 6–1 loss.

== College career ==
Gonda enrolled at Duquesne University to play college football for the Dukes. He was on the freshman team in 1938 and the varsity team from 1939 to 1941. He opened the 1939 season as Duquesne's starting right halfback. On October 19, 1939, it was reported that Gonda had been moved to fullback. The 1941 Dukes went undefeated. At the conclusion of his college career, Gonda played in the Blue–Gray Football Classic.

== Professional career ==
After going undrafted in the 1942 NFL draft, Gonda signed with the Pittsburgh Steelers on January 15, 1942. At the time of his signing, Gonda had obtained a 60-day deferment from the military. After returning from the military, Gonda signed with the Steelers again on October 12, 1942. He played in five games, starting one, for Pittsburgh during the 1942 season, totaling 17 carries for 147 yards and two touchdowns, one reception for seven yards, two punt returns for 17 yards, and one interception on defense for 37 yards.

Gonda served in the United States Navy after the 1942 season. After World War II, he played in two games for the Richmond Rebels of the Dixie League in 1946.

== Personal life ==
Gonda taught and coached at schools in Richmond, Virginia. He later moved to Woodville, Mississippi, where he also taught and coached. He served three terms as mayor of Woodville from 1973 to 1985. Gonda died of cancer on September 19, 1994, at a hospital in Woodville.
