= 1939 Swarthmore Garnet Tide football team =

American college football season

1939 Swarthmore Garnet Tide football
- Conference: Independent
- Record: 6–0–1
- Head coach: Lew Elverson (2nd season)
- Home stadium: Alumni Field

1939 Eastern college football independents records
	Conf.			Overall
Team	W	L	T	W		L		T
No. 4 Cornell		–		8	–	0	–	0
No. 10 Duquesne		–		8	–	0	–	1
Swarthmore		–		6	–	0	–	1
Scranton		–		7	–	0	–	2
Princeton		–		7	–	1	–	0
La Salle		–		6	–	1	–	1
Penn State		–		5	–	1	–	2
No. 11 Boston College		–		9	–	2	–	0
No. 17 Fordham		–		6	–	2	–	0
Villanova		–		6	–	2	–	0
Boston University		–		5	–	3	–	0
Brown		–		5	–	3	–	1
Dartmouth		–		5	–	3	–	1
Hofstra		–		4	–	3	–	0
NYU		–		5	–	4	–	0
Pittsburgh		–		5	–	4	–	0
Harvard		–		4	–	4	–	0
Manhattan		–		4	–	4	–	0
Penn		–		4	–	4	–	0
Syracuse		–		3	–	3	–	2
Vermont		–		3	–	3	–	2
Tufts		–		3	–	4	–	1
Yale		–		3	–	4	–	1
Army		–		3	–	4	–	2
Bucknell		–		3	–	5	–	0
Carnegie Tech		–		3	–	5	–	0
Providence		–		3	–	5	–	0
Columbia		–		2	–	4	–	2
Massachusetts State		–		2	–	5	–	2
Colgate		–		2	–	5	–	1
Temple		–		2	–	7	–	0
CCNY		–		1	–	7	–	0
Buffalo		–		0	–	7	–	0
Rankings from AP Poll

The 1939 Swarthmore Quakers football team was an American football team that represented Swarthmore College as an independent during the 1939 college football season. In its second year under head coach Lew Elverson, Swarthmore compiled a 6–0–1 record and outscored opponents by a total of 140 to 36.

The team played its home games at Alumni Field in Swarthmore, Pennsylvania.

== Schedule ==
Date	Opponent	Site	Result	Attendance	Source
October 7	Washington College	Alumni Field; Swarthmore, PA	W 13–12		
October 14	at Susquehanna	University Field; Selinsgrove, PA	W 27–12		
October 21	at Drexel	Drexel Field; Philadelphia, PA	W 14–0	6,000	
October 28	at Oberlin	Oberlin, OH	T 12–12	3,000	
November 4	at Hamilton	Clinton, NY	W 6–0		
November 11	Johns Hopkins	Alumni Field; Swarthmore, PA	W 10–0		
November 18	American	Alumni Field; Swarthmore, PA	W 58–0	4,000	
