= 1939 Lehigh Engineers football team =

American college football season

1939 Lehigh Engineers football
- Conference: Middle Three Conference
- Record: 3–6 (0–2 Middle Three)
- Head coach: Glen Harmeson (6th season)
- Captain: Alfred Cox
- Home stadium: Taylor Stadium

1939 Middle Three Conference football standings
	Conf.					Overall
Team	W		L		T	W		L		T
Rutgers $	2	–	0	–	0	7	–	1	–	1
Lafayette	1	–	1	–	0	4	–	5	–	0
Lehigh	0	–	2	–	0	3	–	6	–	0
$ – Conference champion

The 1939 Lehigh Engineers football team was an American football team that represented Lehigh University during the 1939 college football season. In its sixth season under head coach Glen Harmeson, the team compiled a 3–6 record, and lost both games against its Middle Three Conference rivals. Lehigh played home games at Taylor Stadium in Bethlehem, Pennsylvania.

Lehigh was ranked at No. 297 (out of 609 teams) in the final Litkenhous Ratings for 1939.

== Schedule ==
Date	Opponent	Site	Result	Attendance	Source
September 30	Alfred*	Taylor Stadium; Bethlehem, PA	L 0–7		
October 7	Case*	Taylor Stadium; Bethlehem, PA	L 13–20		
October 14	at Penn State*	New Beaver Field; State College, PA	L 7–49	10,000	
October 21	Buffalo*	Taylor Stadium; Bethlehem, PA	W 22–0	5,000	
October 28	at Rutgers	Rutgers Stadium; Piscataway, NJ	L 6–20	8,500	
November 4	Haverford*	Taylor Stadium; Bethlehem, PA	W 20–13		
November 11	Muhlenberg*	Taylor Stadium; Bethlehem, PA	L 0–23	7,000	
November 18	Delaware*	Taylor Stadium; Bethlehem, PA	W 39–7	4,000	
November 25	Lafayette	Taylor Stadium; Bethlehem, PA (rivalry)	L 13–29	13,000	
*Non-conference game
