= 1939 Yale Bulldogs football team =

American college football season

1939 Yale Bulldogs football
- Conference: Independent
- Record: 3–4–1
- Head coach: Ducky Pond (6th season)
- Captain: J. William Stack Jr.
- Home stadium: Yale Bowl

1939 Eastern college football independents records
	Conf.			Overall
Team	W	L	T	W		L		T
No. 4 Cornell		–		8	–	0	–	0
No. 10 Duquesne		–		8	–	0	–	1
Swarthmore		–		6	–	0	–	1
Scranton		–		7	–	0	–	2
Princeton		–		7	–	1	–	0
La Salle		–		6	–	1	–	1
Penn State		–		5	–	1	–	2
No. 11 Boston College		–		9	–	2	–	0
No. 17 Fordham		–		6	–	2	–	0
Villanova		–		6	–	2	–	0
Boston University		–		5	–	3	–	0
Brown		–		5	–	3	–	1
Dartmouth		–		5	–	3	–	1
Hofstra		–		4	–	3	–	0
NYU		–		5	–	4	–	0
Pittsburgh		–		5	–	4	–	0
Harvard		–		4	–	4	–	0
Manhattan		–		4	–	4	–	0
Penn		–		4	–	4	–	0
Syracuse		–		3	–	3	–	2
Vermont		–		3	–	3	–	2
Tufts		–		3	–	4	–	1
Yale		–		3	–	4	–	1
Army		–		3	–	4	–	2
Bucknell		–		3	–	5	–	0
Carnegie Tech		–		3	–	5	–	0
Providence		–		3	–	5	–	0
Columbia		–		2	–	4	–	2
Massachusetts State		–		2	–	5	–	2
Colgate		–		2	–	5	–	1
Temple		–		2	–	7	–	0
CCNY		–		1	–	7	–	0
Buffalo		–		0	–	7	–	0
Rankings from AP Poll

The 1939 Yale Bulldogs football team represented Yale University in the 1939 college football season. The Bulldogs were led by sixth-year head coach Ducky Pond, played their home games at the Yale Bowl and finished the season with a 3–4–1 record.

Yale was ranked at No. 73 (out of 609 teams) in the final Litkenhous Ratings for 1939.

== Schedule ==
Date	Opponent	Site	Result	Attendance	Source
October 7	Columbia	Yale Bowl; New Haven, CT	W 10–7		
October 14	Penn	Yale Bowl; New Haven, CT	L 0–6	32,500	
October 21	Army	Yale Bowl; New Haven, CT	W 20–15		
October 28	at No. 3 Michigan	Michigan Stadium; Ann Arbor, MI	L 7–27	54,480	
November 4	Dartmouth	Yale Bowl; New Haven, CT	L 0–33		
November 11	Brown	Yale Bowl; New Haven, CT	T 14–14	32,000	
November 18	Princeton	Yale Bowl; New Haven, CT (rivalry)	L 7–13		
November 25	at Harvard	Harvard Stadium; Boston, MA (rivalry)	W 20–7	52,000	
Rankings from AP Poll released prior to the game
