= 1939 Dartmouth Indians football team =

American college football season

1939 Dartmouth Indians football
- Conference: Independent
- Record: 5–3–1
- Head coach: Earl Blaik (6th season)
- Home stadium: Memorial Field

1939 Eastern college football independents records
	Conf.			Overall
Team	W	L	T	W		L		T
No. 4 Cornell		–		8	–	0	–	0
No. 10 Duquesne		–		8	–	0	–	1
Swarthmore		–		6	–	0	–	1
Scranton		–		7	–	0	–	2
Princeton		–		7	–	1	–	0
La Salle		–		6	–	1	–	1
Penn State		–		5	–	1	–	2
No. 11 Boston College		–		9	–	2	–	0
No. 17 Fordham		–		6	–	2	–	0
Villanova		–		6	–	2	–	0
Boston University		–		5	–	3	–	0
Brown		–		5	–	3	–	1
Dartmouth		–		5	–	3	–	1
Hofstra		–		4	–	3	–	0
NYU		–		5	–	4	–	0
Pittsburgh		–		5	–	4	–	0
Harvard		–		4	–	4	–	0
Manhattan		–		4	–	4	–	0
Penn		–		4	–	4	–	0
Syracuse		–		3	–	3	–	2
Vermont		–		3	–	3	–	2
Tufts		–		3	–	4	–	1
Yale		–		3	–	4	–	1
Army		–		3	–	4	–	2
Bucknell		–		3	–	5	–	0
Carnegie Tech		–		3	–	5	–	0
Providence		–		3	–	5	–	0
Columbia		–		2	–	4	–	2
Massachusetts State		–		2	–	5	–	2
Colgate		–		2	–	5	–	1
Temple		–		2	–	7	–	0
CCNY		–		1	–	7	–	0
Buffalo		–		0	–	7	–	0
Rankings from AP Poll

The 1939 Dartmouth Indians football team represented Dartmouth College in the 1939 college football season. The Indians were led by sixth-year head coach Earl Blaik and played their home games at Memorial Field in Hanover, New Hampshire. They finished with a record of 5–3–1 and outscored opponents by a total of 154 to 73. After amassing a 5–0–1 record to start the season and shutting out four of those opponents, Dartmouth ascended to 14th in the AP Poll, but lost their last three contests against, No. 4 Cornell, Princeton, and a Stanford team that finished 1–7–1—their only win coming against Dartmouth. Dartmouth finished the year unranked in the AP poll and were ranked No. 29 in the final Litkenhous Ratings.

== Schedule ==
Date	Opponent	Rank	Site	Result	Attendance	Source
September 30	St. Lawrence		Memorial Field; Hanover, NH	W 41–9	6,000	
October 7	Hampden–Sydney		Memorial Field; Hanover, NH	W 34–6		
October 14	at Navy		Municipal Stadium; Baltimore, MD	T 0–0		
October 21	Lafayette		Memorial Field; Hanover, MH	W 14–0		
October 28	at Harvard		Harvard Stadium; Boston, MA (rivalry)	W 16–0	35,000	
November 4	at Yale		Yale Bowl; New Haven, CT	W 33–0		
November 11	at Princeton	No. 14	Palmer Stadium; Princeton, NJ	L 7–9		
November 18	No. 4 Cornell	No. 20	Memorial Field; Hanover, NH (rivalry)	L 6–35	16,000	
December 2	vs. Stanford		Polo Grounds; Nork York, NY	L 3–14	10,603	
Rankings from AP Poll released prior to the game
