= 1939 Penn State Nittany Lions football team =

American college football season

1939 Penn State Nittany Lions football
- Conference: Independent
- Record: 5–1–2
- Head coach: Bob Higgins (10th season)
- Captain: Spike Alter
- Home stadium: New Beaver Field

1939 Eastern college football independents records
	Conf.			Overall
Team	W	L	T	W		L		T
No. 4 Cornell		–		8	–	0	–	0
No. 10 Duquesne		–		8	–	0	–	1
Swarthmore		–		6	–	0	–	1
Scranton		–		7	–	0	–	2
Princeton		–		7	–	1	–	0
La Salle		–		6	–	1	–	1
Penn State		–		5	–	1	–	2
No. 11 Boston College		–		9	–	2	–	0
No. 17 Fordham		–		6	–	2	–	0
Villanova		–		6	–	2	–	0
Boston University		–		5	–	3	–	0
Brown		–		5	–	3	–	1
Dartmouth		–		5	–	3	–	1
Hofstra		–		4	–	3	–	0
NYU		–		5	–	4	–	0
Pittsburgh		–		5	–	4	–	0
Harvard		–		4	–	4	–	0
Manhattan		–		4	–	4	–	0
Penn		–		4	–	4	–	0
Syracuse		–		3	–	3	–	2
Vermont		–		3	–	3	–	2
Tufts		–		3	–	4	–	1
Yale		–		3	–	4	–	1
Army		–		3	–	4	–	2
Bucknell		–		3	–	5	–	0
Carnegie Tech		–		3	–	5	–	0
Providence		–		3	–	5	–	0
Columbia		–		2	–	4	–	2
Massachusetts State		–		2	–	5	–	2
Colgate		–		2	–	5	–	1
Temple		–		2	–	7	–	0
CCNY		–		1	–	7	–	0
Buffalo		–		0	–	7	–	0
Rankings from AP Poll

The 1939 Penn State Nittany Lions football team represented the Pennsylvania State University as an independent during the 1939 college football season. The team was coached by Bob Higgins and played its home games in New Beaver Field in State College, Pennsylvania.

Penn State was ranked at No. 51 (out of 609 teams) in the final Litkenhous Ratings for 1939.

== Schedule ==
Date	Opponent	Site	Result	Attendance	Source
October 7	Bucknell	New Beaver Field; State College, PA	W 13–3	11,143	
October 14	Lehigh^{†}	New Beaver Field; State College, PA	W 49–7	9,149	
October 21	at No. 12 Cornell	Schoellkopf Field; Ithaca, NY	L 0–47	7,500	
October 28	at Syracuse	Archbold Stadium; Syracuse, NY (rivalry)	T 6–6	16,000	
November 4	Maryland	New Beaver Field; State College, PA (rivalry)	W 12–0	7,000	
November 11	at Penn	Franklin Field; Philadelphia, PA	W 10–0	40,000	
November 18	at Army	Michie Stadium; West Point, NY	T 14–14	7,412	
November 25	Pittsburgh	New Beaver Field; State College, PA (rivalry)	W 10–0	20,000	
^{†}Homecoming; Rankings from AP Poll released prior to the game
