= 1939 Bucknell Bison football team =

American college football season

1939 Bucknell Bison football
- Conference: Independent
- Record: 3–5
- Head coach: Al Humphreys (3rd season)
- Home stadium: Memorial Stadium

1939 Eastern college football independents records
	Conf.			Overall
Team	W	L	T	W		L		T
No. 4 Cornell		–		8	–	0	–	0
No. 10 Duquesne		–		8	–	0	–	1
Swarthmore		–		6	–	0	–	1
Scranton		–		7	–	0	–	2
Princeton		–		7	–	1	–	0
La Salle		–		6	–	1	–	1
Penn State		–		5	–	1	–	2
No. 11 Boston College		–		9	–	2	–	0
No. 17 Fordham		–		6	–	2	–	0
Villanova		–		6	–	2	–	0
Boston University		–		5	–	3	–	0
Brown		–		5	–	3	–	1
Dartmouth		–		5	–	3	–	1
Hofstra		–		4	–	3	–	0
NYU		–		5	–	4	–	0
Pittsburgh		–		5	–	4	–	0
Harvard		–		4	–	4	–	0
Manhattan		–		4	–	4	–	0
Penn		–		4	–	4	–	0
Syracuse		–		3	–	3	–	2
Vermont		–		3	–	3	–	2
Tufts		–		3	–	4	–	1
Yale		–		3	–	4	–	1
Army		–		3	–	4	–	2
Bucknell		–		3	–	5	–	0
Carnegie Tech		–		3	–	5	–	0
Providence		–		3	–	5	–	0
Columbia		–		2	–	4	–	2
Massachusetts State		–		2	–	5	–	2
Colgate		–		2	–	5	–	1
Temple		–		2	–	7	–	0
CCNY		–		1	–	7	–	0
Buffalo		–		0	–	7	–	0
Rankings from AP Poll

The 1939 Bucknell Bison football team was an American football team that represented Bucknell University as an independent during the 1939 college football season. In their third season under head coach Al Humphreys, the Bison compiled a 3–5 record and outscored opponents by a total of 88 to 64.

Bucknell was ranked at No. 94 (out of 609 teams) in the final Litkenhous Ratings for 1939.

The team played its home games at Memorial Stadium in Lewisburg, Pennsylvania.

== Schedule ==
Date	Opponent	Site	Result	Attendance	Source
September 30	at Gettysburg	Memorial Field; Gettysburg, PA	L 0–6		
October 7	at Penn State	New Beaver Field; State College, PA	L 3–13	12,000	
October 14	Albright	Memorial Stadium; Lewisburg, PA	W 15–0		
October 21	Georgetown^{†}	Memorial Stadium; Lewisburg, PA	L 7–13		
October 27	at Temple	Temple Stadium; Philadelphia, PA	L 0–16	10,000	
November 4	Western Maryland	Memorial Stadium; Lewisburg, PA	W 32–6		
November 18	Muhlenberg	Memorial Stadium; Lewisburg, PA	W 25–3		
November 25	at George Washington	Griffith Stadium; Washington, DC	L 6–7	3,000	
^{†}Homecoming
