= 1939 Army Cadets football team =

American college football season

1939 Army Cadets football
- Conference: Independent
- Record: 3–4–2
- Head coach: William H. Wood (2nd season)
- Captain: Harry Stella
- Home stadium: Michie Stadium

1939 Eastern college football independents records
	Conf.			Overall
Team	W	L	T	W		L		T
No. 4 Cornell		–		8	–	0	–	0
No. 10 Duquesne		–		8	–	0	–	1
Swarthmore		–		6	–	0	–	1
Scranton		–		7	–	0	–	2
Princeton		–		7	–	1	–	0
La Salle		–		6	–	1	–	1
Penn State		–		5	–	1	–	2
No. 11 Boston College		–		9	–	2	–	0
No. 17 Fordham		–		6	–	2	–	0
Villanova		–		6	–	2	–	0
Boston University		–		5	–	3	–	0
Brown		–		5	–	3	–	1
Dartmouth		–		5	–	3	–	1
Hofstra		–		4	–	3	–	0
NYU		–		5	–	4	–	0
Pittsburgh		–		5	–	4	–	0
Harvard		–		4	–	4	–	0
Manhattan		–		4	–	4	–	0
Penn		–		4	–	4	–	0
Syracuse		–		3	–	3	–	2
Vermont		–		3	–	3	–	2
Tufts		–		3	–	4	–	1
Yale		–		3	–	4	–	1
Army		–		3	–	4	–	2
Bucknell		–		3	–	5	–	0
Carnegie Tech		–		3	–	5	–	0
Providence		–		3	–	5	–	0
Columbia		–		2	–	4	–	2
Massachusetts State		–		2	–	5	–	2
Colgate		–		2	–	5	–	1
Temple		–		2	–	7	–	0
CCNY		–		1	–	7	–	0
Buffalo		–		0	–	7	–	0
Rankings from AP Poll

The 1939 Army Cadets football team represented the United States Military Academy as an independent during the 1939 college football season. In their second year under head coach William H. Wood, the Cadets compiled a 3–4–2 record and outscored their opponents by a combined total of 106 to 105. In the annual Army–Navy Game, the Midshipmen won 10–0. The Cadets' three other losses came against Yale, Notre Dame, and Harvard.

Army tackle Harry Stella was selected by the United Press (UP), International News Service (INS), and Newsweek magazine as a first-team player on the All-America team.

Army was ranked at No. 91 (out of 609 teams) in the final Litkenhous Ratings for 1939.

== Schedule ==
Date	Opponent	Site	Result	Attendance	Source
September 30	Furman	Michie Stadium; West Point, NY	W 16–7	7,000	
October 7	Centre	Michie Stadium; West Point, NY	W 9–6	3,000	
October 14	at Columbia	Baker Field; New York, NY	T 6–6	27,000	
October 21	at Yale	Yale Bowl; New Haven, CT	L 15–20		
October 28	Ursinus	Michie Stadium; West Point, NY	W 46–13		
November 4	vs. No. 4 Notre Dame	Yankee Stadium; Bronx, NY (rivalry)	L 0–14	75,632	
November 11	at Harvard	Harvard Stadium; Boston, MA	L 0–15	45,000	
November 18	Penn State	Michie Stadium; West Point, NY	T 14–14	7,412	
December 2	vs. Navy	Philadelphia Municipal Stadium; Philadelphia, PA (Army–Navy Game)	L 0–10	102,000	
Rankings from AP Poll released prior to the game
