= 1939 Cornell Big Red football team =

American college football season

1939 Cornell Big Red football

National champion (Litkenhous) Co-national champion (Sagarin) Eastern champion
- Conference: Independent

Ranking
- AP: No. 4
- Record: 8–0
- Head coach: Carl Snavely (4th season)
- Offensive scheme: Single-wing
- Captains: Vincent Eichler; Malvern Baker; Ken Brown
- Home stadium: Schoellkopf Field

1939 Eastern college football independents records
	Conf.			Overall
Team	W	L	T	W		L		T
No. 4 Cornell		–		8	–	0	–	0
No. 10 Duquesne		–		8	–	0	–	1
Swarthmore		–		6	–	0	–	1
Scranton		–		7	–	0	–	2
Princeton		–		7	–	1	–	0
La Salle		–		6	–	1	–	1
Penn State		–		5	–	1	–	2
No. 11 Boston College		–		9	–	2	–	0
No. 17 Fordham		–		6	–	2	–	0
Villanova		–		6	–	2	–	0
Boston University		–		5	–	3	–	0
Brown		–		5	–	3	–	1
Dartmouth		–		5	–	3	–	1
Hofstra		–		4	–	3	–	0
NYU		–		5	–	4	–	0
Pittsburgh		–		5	–	4	–	0
Harvard		–		4	–	4	–	0
Manhattan		–		4	–	4	–	0
Penn		–		4	–	4	–	0
Syracuse		–		3	–	3	–	2
Vermont		–		3	–	3	–	2
Tufts		–		3	–	4	–	1
Yale		–		3	–	4	–	1
Army		–		3	–	4	–	2
Bucknell		–		3	–	5	–	0
Carnegie Tech		–		3	–	5	–	0
Providence		–		3	–	5	–	0
Columbia		–		2	–	4	–	2
Massachusetts State		–		2	–	5	–	2
Colgate		–		2	–	5	–	1
Temple		–		2	–	7	–	0
CCNY		–		1	–	7	–	0
Buffalo		–		0	–	7	–	0
Rankings from AP Poll

The 1939 Cornell Big Red football team was an American football team that represented Cornell University as an independent during the 1939 college football season. In its fourth season under head coach Carl Snavely, Cornell compiled an 8–0 record and outscored opponents by a total of 197 to 52. After the season, Cornell declined a bid to the 1940 Rose Bowl so that the football players could catch up on their schoolwork.

On December 1, Cornell was awarded the Lambert Trophy as the best Eastern college football team. In the final AP Poll released on December 12, Cornell was ranked No. 4 nationally, behind Texas A&M, Tennessee, and USC. Cornell was named national champion in the Litkenhous Ratings released in December 1939. It was also retroactively recognized as co-national champion in the Sagarin Ratings As of 2026, this remains the last football national title in any division by an Ivy League school.

Cornell tackle Nick Drahos was a consensus first-team selection on the 1939 All-America college football team. He was inducted in 1981 into the College Football Hall of Fame. Quarterback Walter Matuszczak was also selected as a first-team All-American by the New York Sun.

== Schedule ==
Date	Opponent	Rank	Site	Result	Attendance	Source
October 7	Syracuse		Schoellkopf Field; Ithaca, NY	W 19–6	> 23,000	
October 14	at Princeton		Palmer Stadium; Princeton, NJ	W 20–7	35,000	
October 21	Penn State	No. 12	Schoellkopf Field; Ithaca, NY	W 47–0	7,500	
October 28	at No. 4 Ohio State	No. 7	Ohio Stadium; Columbus, OH	W 23–14	49,583	
November 4	Columbia^{†}	No. 3	Schoellkopf Field; Ithaca, NY (rivalry)	W 13–7	15,000	
November 11	Colgate	No. 5	Schoellkopf Field; Ithaca, NY (rivalry)	W 14–12	15,000	
November 18	Dartmouth	No. 4	Memorial Field; Hanover, NH (rivalry)	W 35–6	16,000	
November 30	at Penn	No. 3	Franklin Field; Philadelphia, PA (rivalry)	W 26–0	69,000	
^{†}Homecoming; Rankings from AP Poll released prior to the game
