= 1939 La Salle Explorers football team =

American college football season

1939 La Salle Explorers football
- Conference: Independent
- Record: 6–1–1
- Head coach: Marty Brill (7th season)
- Home stadium: McCarthy Stadium

1939 Eastern college football independents records
	Conf.			Overall
Team	W	L	T	W		L		T
No. 4 Cornell		–		8	–	0	–	0
No. 10 Duquesne		–		8	–	0	–	1
Swarthmore		–		6	–	0	–	1
Scranton		–		7	–	0	–	2
Princeton		–		7	–	1	–	0
La Salle		–		6	–	1	–	1
Penn State		–		5	–	1	–	2
No. 11 Boston College		–		9	–	2	–	0
No. 17 Fordham		–		6	–	2	–	0
Villanova		–		6	–	2	–	0
Boston University		–		5	–	3	–	0
Brown		–		5	–	3	–	1
Dartmouth		–		5	–	3	–	1
Hofstra		–		4	–	3	–	0
NYU		–		5	–	4	–	0
Pittsburgh		–		5	–	4	–	0
Harvard		–		4	–	4	–	0
Manhattan		–		4	–	4	–	0
Penn		–		4	–	4	–	0
Syracuse		–		3	–	3	–	2
Vermont		–		3	–	3	–	2
Tufts		–		3	–	4	–	1
Yale		–		3	–	4	–	1
Army		–		3	–	4	–	2
Bucknell		–		3	–	5	–	0
Carnegie Tech		–		3	–	5	–	0
Providence		–		3	–	5	–	0
Columbia		–		2	–	4	–	2
Massachusetts State		–		2	–	5	–	2
Colgate		–		2	–	5	–	1
Temple		–		2	–	7	–	0
CCNY		–		1	–	7	–	0
Buffalo		–		0	–	7	–	0
Rankings from AP Poll

The 1939 La Salle Explorers football team was an American football team that represented La Salle University as an independent during the 1939 college football season. In their seventh year under head coach Marty Brill, the Explorers compiled a 6–1–1 record, shut out five of eight opponents, and outscored all opponents by a total of 151 to 21. The team played home games at McCarthy Stadium in Philadelphia.

La Salle was ranked at No. 87 (out of 609 teams) in the final Litkenhous Ratings for 1939.

== Schedule ==
Date	Opponent	Site	Result	Attendance	Source
September 29	at Elon	Hillcrest Field; Burlington, NC	W 32–6	1,500	
October 8	Scranton	McCarthy Stadium; Philadelphia, PA	L 7–12	7,500	
October 13	at West Chester	Wayne Field; West Chester, PA	W 28–0	12,000	
October 22	Mount St. Mary's	McCarthy Stadium; Philadelphia, PA	W 19–0	5,000	
October 29	Saint Joseph's	McCarthy Stadium; Philadelphia, PA	W 31–0	10,000	
November 5	Niagara	McCarthy Stadium; Philadelphia, PA	T 0–0		
November 12	at Canisius*	Civic Stadium; Buffalo, NY	W 14–3	13,500	
November 23	at Pennsylvania Military	Chester, PA	W 20–0	5,000	
*Non-conference game
