= 1939 Columbia Lions football team =

American college football season

1939 Columbia Lions football
- Conference: Independent
- Record: 2–4–2
- Head coach: Lou Little (10th season)
- Captain: Frank J. Stulgaitis
- Home stadium: Baker Field

1939 Eastern college football independents records
	Conf.			Overall
Team	W	L	T	W		L		T
No. 4 Cornell		–		8	–	0	–	0
No. 10 Duquesne		–		8	–	0	–	1
Swarthmore		–		6	–	0	–	1
Scranton		–		7	–	0	–	2
Princeton		–		7	–	1	–	0
La Salle		–		6	–	1	–	1
Penn State		–		5	–	1	–	2
No. 11 Boston College		–		9	–	2	–	0
No. 17 Fordham		–		6	–	2	–	0
Villanova		–		6	–	2	–	0
Boston University		–		5	–	3	–	0
Brown		–		5	–	3	–	1
Dartmouth		–		5	–	3	–	1
Hofstra		–		4	–	3	–	0
NYU		–		5	–	4	–	0
Pittsburgh		–		5	–	4	–	0
Harvard		–		4	–	4	–	0
Manhattan		–		4	–	4	–	0
Penn		–		4	–	4	–	0
Syracuse		–		3	–	3	–	2
Vermont		–		3	–	3	–	2
Tufts		–		3	–	4	–	1
Yale		–		3	–	4	–	1
Army		–		3	–	4	–	2
Bucknell		–		3	–	5	–	0
Carnegie Tech		–		3	–	5	–	0
Providence		–		3	–	5	–	0
Columbia		–		2	–	4	–	2
Massachusetts State		–		2	–	5	–	2
Colgate		–		2	–	5	–	1
Temple		–		2	–	7	–	0
CCNY		–		1	–	7	–	0
Buffalo		–		0	–	7	–	0
Rankings from AP Poll

The 1939 Columbia Lions football team was an American football team that represented Columbia University as an independent during the 1939 college football season. In his tenth season, head coach Lou Little led the team to a 2–4–2 record, and the Lions were outscored 88 to 72 by opponents.

Columbia was ranked at No. 41 (out of 609 teams) in the final Litkenhous Ratings for 1939.

The team played its home games at Baker Field in Upper Manhattan.

== Schedule ==
Date	Opponent	Site	Result	Attendance	Source
October 7	at Yale	Yale Bowl; New Haven, CT	L 7–10	30,000	
October 14	Army	Baker Field; New York, NY	T 6–6	27,000	
October 21	Princeton	Baker Field; New York, NY	L 7–14	30,000	
October 28	Virginia Military	Baker Field; New York, NY	W 26–7	12,000	
November 4	at No. 3 Cornell	Schoellkopf Field; Ithaca, NY (rivalry)	L 7–13	15,000	
November 11	at Navy	Thompson Stadium; Annapolis, MD	W 19–13	17,300	
November 18	No. 6 Tulane	Baker Field; New York, NY	L 0–25	25,000	
November 25	Colgate	Baker Field; New York, NY	T 0–0	20,000	
Rankings from AP Poll released prior to the game
