= 1939 Harvard Crimson football team =

American college football season

1939 Harvard Crimson football
- Conference: Independent
- Record: 4–4
- Head coach: Dick Harlow (5th season)
- Home stadium: Harvard Stadium

1939 Eastern college football independents records
	Conf.			Overall
Team	W	L	T	W		L		T
No. 4 Cornell		–		8	–	0	–	0
No. 10 Duquesne		–		8	–	0	–	1
Swarthmore		–		6	–	0	–	1
Scranton		–		7	–	0	–	2
Princeton		–		7	–	1	–	0
La Salle		–		6	–	1	–	1
Penn State		–		5	–	1	–	2
No. 11 Boston College		–		9	–	2	–	0
No. 17 Fordham		–		6	–	2	–	0
Villanova		–		6	–	2	–	0
Boston University		–		5	–	3	–	0
Brown		–		5	–	3	–	1
Dartmouth		–		5	–	3	–	1
Hofstra		–		4	–	3	–	0
NYU		–		5	–	4	–	0
Pittsburgh		–		5	–	4	–	0
Harvard		–		4	–	4	–	0
Manhattan		–		4	–	4	–	0
Penn		–		4	–	4	–	0
Syracuse		–		3	–	3	–	2
Vermont		–		3	–	3	–	2
Tufts		–		3	–	4	–	1
Yale		–		3	–	4	–	1
Army		–		3	–	4	–	2
Bucknell		–		3	–	5	–	0
Carnegie Tech		–		3	–	5	–	0
Providence		–		3	–	5	–	0
Columbia		–		2	–	4	–	2
Massachusetts State		–		2	–	5	–	2
Colgate		–		2	–	5	–	1
Temple		–		2	–	7	–	0
CCNY		–		1	–	7	–	0
Buffalo		–		0	–	7	–	0
Rankings from AP Poll

The 1939 Harvard Crimson football team was an American football team that represented Harvard University as an independent during the 1939 college football season. In its fifth season under head coach Dick Harlow, the team compiled a 4–4 record and outscored opponents by a total of 162 to 67.

Harvard was ranked at No. 57 (out of 609 teams) in the final Litkenhous Ratings for 1939.

The team played its home games at Harvard Stadium in Cambridge, Massachusetts.

== Schedule ==
Date	Opponent	Site	Result	Attendance	Source
October 7	Bates	Harvard Stadium; Boston, MA	W 20–0		
October 14	at Chicago	Stagg Field; Chicago, IL	W 61–0		
October 21	Penn	Harvard Stadium; Boston, MA (rivalry)	L 7–22	30,000	
October 28	Dartmouth	BostonStadium; Cambridge, MA (rivalry)	L 0–16	35,000	
November 4	at Princeton	Palmer Stadium; Princeton, NJ (rivalry)	L 6–9		
November 11	Army	Harvard Stadium; Boston, MA	W 15–0	45,000	
November 18	New Hampshire	Harvard Stadium; Boston, MA	W 46–0	15,000	
November 25	Yale	Harvard Stadium; Boston, MA (rivalry)	L 7–20	52,000	
