= 1939 Penn Quakers football team =

American college football season

1939 Penn Quakers football
- Conference: Independent
- Record: 4–4
- Head coach: George Munger (2nd season)
- Captain: Harlan Gustafson
- Home stadium: Franklin Field

1939 Eastern college football independents records
	Conf.			Overall
Team	W	L	T	W		L		T
No. 4 Cornell		–		8	–	0	–	0
No. 10 Duquesne		–		8	–	0	–	1
Swarthmore		–		6	–	0	–	1
Scranton		–		7	–	0	–	2
Princeton		–		7	–	1	–	0
La Salle		–		6	–	1	–	1
Penn State		–		5	–	1	–	2
No. 11 Boston College		–		9	–	2	–	0
No. 17 Fordham		–		6	–	2	–	0
Villanova		–		6	–	2	–	0
Boston University		–		5	–	3	–	0
Brown		–		5	–	3	–	1
Dartmouth		–		5	–	3	–	1
Hofstra		–		4	–	3	–	0
NYU		–		5	–	4	–	0
Pittsburgh		–		5	–	4	–	0
Harvard		–		4	–	4	–	0
Manhattan		–		4	–	4	–	0
Penn		–		4	–	4	–	0
Syracuse		–		3	–	3	–	2
Vermont		–		3	–	3	–	2
Tufts		–		3	–	4	–	1
Yale		–		3	–	4	–	1
Army		–		3	–	4	–	2
Bucknell		–		3	–	5	–	0
Carnegie Tech		–		3	–	5	–	0
Providence		–		3	–	5	–	0
Columbia		–		2	–	4	–	2
Massachusetts State		–		2	–	5	–	2
Colgate		–		2	–	5	–	1
Temple		–		2	–	7	–	0
CCNY		–		1	–	7	–	0
Buffalo		–		0	–	7	–	0
Rankings from AP Poll

The 1939 Penn Quakers football team was an American football team that represented the University of Pennsylvania as an independent during the 1939 college football season. In its second season under head coach George Munger, the team compiled a 4–4 record and was outscored by a total of 98 to 70.

Penn was not ranked in the final AP poll, but it was ranked at No. 20 in the 1939 Williamson System ratings, and at No. 48 in the final Litkenhous Ratings for 1939.

The team played its home games at Franklin Field in Philadelphia.

== Schedule ==
Date	Opponent	Rank	Site	Result	Attendance	Source
October 7	Lafayette		Franklin Field; Philadelphia, PA	W 6–0	35,000	
October 14	at Yale		Yale Bowl; New Haven, CT	W 6–0	32,500	
October 21	at Harvard		Harvard Stadium; Boston, MA (rivalry)	W 22–7	30,000	
October 28	No. 13 North Carolina	No. 16	Franklin Field; Philadelphia, PA	L 6–30	55,000	
November 4	Navy		Franklin Field; Philadelphia, PA	W 13–6	70,000	
November 11	Penn State		Franklin Field; Philadelphia, PA	L 0–10	40,000	
November 18	Michigan		Franklin Field; Philadelphia, PA	L 17–19	39,510	
November 25	No. 3 Cornell		Franklin Field; Philadelphia, PA (rivalry)	L 0–26	69,000	
Rankings from AP Poll released prior to the game
