= 1939 Princeton Tigers football team =

American college football season

1939 Princeton Tigers football
- Conference: Independent
- Record: 7–1
- Head coach: Tad Wieman (2nd season)
- Captain: Bob Tierney
- Home stadium: Palmer Stadium

1939 Eastern college football independents records
	Conf.			Overall
Team	W	L	T	W		L		T
No. 4 Cornell		–		8	–	0	–	0
No. 10 Duquesne		–		8	–	0	–	1
Swarthmore		–		6	–	0	–	1
Scranton		–		7	–	0	–	2
Princeton		–		7	–	1	–	0
La Salle		–		6	–	1	–	1
Penn State		–		5	–	1	–	2
No. 11 Boston College		–		9	–	2	–	0
No. 17 Fordham		–		6	–	2	–	0
Villanova		–		6	–	2	–	0
Boston University		–		5	–	3	–	0
Brown		–		5	–	3	–	1
Dartmouth		–		5	–	3	–	1
Hofstra		–		4	–	3	–	0
NYU		–		5	–	4	–	0
Pittsburgh		–		5	–	4	–	0
Harvard		–		4	–	4	–	0
Manhattan		–		4	–	4	–	0
Penn		–		4	–	4	–	0
Syracuse		–		3	–	3	–	2
Vermont		–		3	–	3	–	2
Tufts		–		3	–	4	–	1
Yale		–		3	–	4	–	1
Army		–		3	–	4	–	2
Bucknell		–		3	–	5	–	0
Carnegie Tech		–		3	–	5	–	0
Providence		–		3	–	5	–	0
Columbia		–		2	–	4	–	2
Massachusetts State		–		2	–	5	–	2
Colgate		–		2	–	5	–	1
Temple		–		2	–	7	–	0
CCNY		–		1	–	7	–	0
Buffalo		–		0	–	7	–	0
Rankings from AP Poll

The 1939 Princeton Tigers football team was an American football team that represented Princeton University as an independent during the 1939 college football season. In its second season under head coach Tad Wieman, the team compiled a 7–1 record and outscored opponents by a total of 132 to 65. Princeton played its 1939 home games at Palmer Stadium in Princeton, New Jersey.

Princeton was ranked No. 19 in the AP Poll issued prior to its final game against Navy. Despite defeating Navy by a 28–0 score, the Tigers dropped out of the final AP Poll. Princeton's sole loss was to the 1939 Cornell Big Red football team that finished the season undefeated and ranked No. 4 in the final AP Poll.

Princeton was not ranked in the final AP poll, but it was ranked at No. 14 in the 1939 Williamson System ratings, and at No. 24 in the final Litkenhous Ratings.

Tackle Bob Tierney was Princeton's team captain. Guard James H. Worth received the John Prentiss Poe Cup, the team's highest award.

== Schedule ==
Date	Opponent	Rank	Site	Result	Attendance	Source
October 7	Williams		Palmer Stadium; Princeton, NJ	W 26–6	15,000	
October 14	Cornell		Palmer Stadium; Princeton, NJ	L 7–20	35,000	
October 21	at Columbia		New York, NY	W 14–7	30,000	
October 28	Brown		Palmer Stadium; Princeton, NJ	W 26–12	25,000	
November 4	Harvard		Palmer Stadium; Princeton, NJ (rivalry)	W 9–6		
November 11	No. 14 Dartmouth		Palmer Stadium; Princeton, NJ	W 9–7	45,000	
November 18	at Yale		Yale Bowl; New Haven, CT (rivalry)	W 13–7	35,000	
November 25	Navy	No. 19	Palmer Stadium; Princeton, NJ	W 28–0	35,000	
Rankings from AP Poll released prior to the game
