= 1939 Lafayette Leopards football team =

American football club

1939 Lafayette Leopards football
- Conference: Middle Three Conference
- Record: 4–5 (1–1 Middle Three)
- Head coach: Edward Mylin (3rd season)
- Captain: Hunter Jaggard
- Home stadium: Fisher Field

1939 Middle Three Conference football standings
	Conf.					Overall
Team	W		L		T	W		L		T
Rutgers $	2	–	0	–	0	7	–	1	–	1
Lafayette	1	–	1	–	0	4	–	5	–	0
Lehigh	0	–	2	–	0	3	–	6	–	0
$ – Conference champion

The 1939 Lafayette Leopards football team was an American football team that represented Lafayette College in the Middle Three Conference during the 1939 college football season. In its third season under head coach Edward Mylin, the team compiled a 4–5 record. Hunter Jaggard was the team captain.

Lafayette was ranked at No. 97 (out of 609 teams) in the final Litkenhous Ratings for 1939.

== Schedule ==
Date	Opponent	Site	Result	Attendance	Source
September 30	Ursinus*	Fisher Field; Easton, PA	W 33–0	4,000	
October 7	at Penn*	Franklin Field; Philadelphia, PA	L 0–6	35,000	
October 14	Muhlenberg*	Fisher Field; Easton, PA	L 6–7	8,000	
October 21	at Dartmouth*	Memorial Field; Hanover, NH	L 0–14		
October 28	Gettysburg*	Fisher Field; Easton, PA	W 40–0		
November 4	at NYU*	Ohio Field; New York, NY	L 0–14		
November 11	Rutgers	Fisher Field; Easton, PA	L 6–13	12,000	
November 18	Washington & Jefferson*	Fisher Field; Easton, PA	W 13–0	4,000	
November 25	at Lehigh	Taylor Stadium; Bethlethem, PA (rivalry)	W 29–13	13,000	
*Non-conference game
