= 1939 Duquesne Dukes football team =

American college football season

1939 Duquesne Dukes football
- Conference: Independent

Ranking
- AP: No. 10
- Record: 8–0–1
- Head coach: Aldo Donelli (1st season)
- Home stadium: Forbes Field

1939 Eastern college football independents records
	Conf.			Overall
Team	W	L	T	W		L		T
No. 4 Cornell		–		8	–	0	–	0
No. 10 Duquesne		–		8	–	0	–	1
Swarthmore		–		6	–	0	–	1
Scranton		–		7	–	0	–	2
Princeton		–		7	–	1	–	0
La Salle		–		6	–	1	–	1
Penn State		–		5	–	1	–	2
No. 11 Boston College		–		9	–	2	–	0
No. 17 Fordham		–		6	–	2	–	0
Villanova		–		6	–	2	–	0
Boston University		–		5	–	3	–	0
Brown		–		5	–	3	–	1
Dartmouth		–		5	–	3	–	1
Hofstra		–		4	–	3	–	0
NYU		–		5	–	4	–	0
Pittsburgh		–		5	–	4	–	0
Harvard		–		4	–	4	–	0
Manhattan		–		4	–	4	–	0
Penn		–		4	–	4	–	0
Syracuse		–		3	–	3	–	2
Vermont		–		3	–	3	–	2
Tufts		–		3	–	4	–	1
Yale		–		3	–	4	–	1
Army		–		3	–	4	–	2
Bucknell		–		3	–	5	–	0
Carnegie Tech		–		3	–	5	–	0
Providence		–		3	–	5	–	0
Columbia		–		2	–	4	–	2
Massachusetts State		–		2	–	5	–	2
Colgate		–		2	–	5	–	1
Temple		–		2	–	7	–	0
CCNY		–		1	–	7	–	0
Buffalo		–		0	–	7	–	0
Rankings from AP Poll

The 1939 Duquesne Dukes football team was an American football team that represented Duquesne University as an independent the 1939 college football season. In their first year under head coach Aldo Donelli, the Dukes compiled an 8–0–1 record, shut out five of nine opponents, outscored all opponents by a total of 152 to 43, and were ranked No. 10 in the final AP poll and No. 32 in the final Litkenhous Ratings.

For the second time in four years, the Dukes upset cross-town rivals Pittsburgh, this time as the Panthers were the number one team in the AP poll.

Tackle Carl Nery won third-team honors on the 1939 All-America team and second-team honors on the All-Eastern team. Other key players included halfback/fullback George Gonda.

The team played its home games at Forbes Field (five games) and Pitt Stadium (two games) in Pittsburgh, Pennsylvania

== Schedule ==
Date	Opponent	Rank	Site	Result	Attendance	Source
September 29	Illinois Wesleyan		Forbes Field; Pittsburgh, PA	W 31–0		
October 6	Waynesburg		Forbes Field; Pittsburgh, PA	W 20–0		
October 14	at Manhattan		Polo Grounds; New York, NY	W 7–0		
October 21	at No. 1 Pittsburgh		Pitt Stadium; Pittsburgh, PA	W 21–13	23,000–25,000	
October 27	Texas Tech	No. 11	Forbes Field; Pittsburgh, PA	W 13–0	11,061	
November 4	Marquette	No. 13	Forbes Field; Pittsburgh, PA	W 21–13	12,000	
November 11	at NC State	No. 12	Riddick Stadium; Raleigh, NC	W 7–0	13,000	
November 25	at Carnegie Tech	No. 12	Pitt Stadium; Pittsburgh, PA	W 22–7	37,500	
December 2	Detroit	No. 6	Forbes Field; Pittsburgh, PA	T 10–10	23,691	
Rankings from AP Poll released prior to the game; Source:

== Game summaries ==
=== Pittsburgh ===
Week 4: Duquesne at Pitt

Team	1	2	3	4	Total
• Duquesne	0	7	0	14	21
No. 1 Pitt	13	0	0	0	13

- Date: October 21, 1939
- Location: Pitt Stadium
  Pittsburgh, PA
- Game start: 2:00 p.m.
- Game attendance: 23,000
- Game weather: cloudy and cool
- Referee: T. A. Timlin (Niagara)

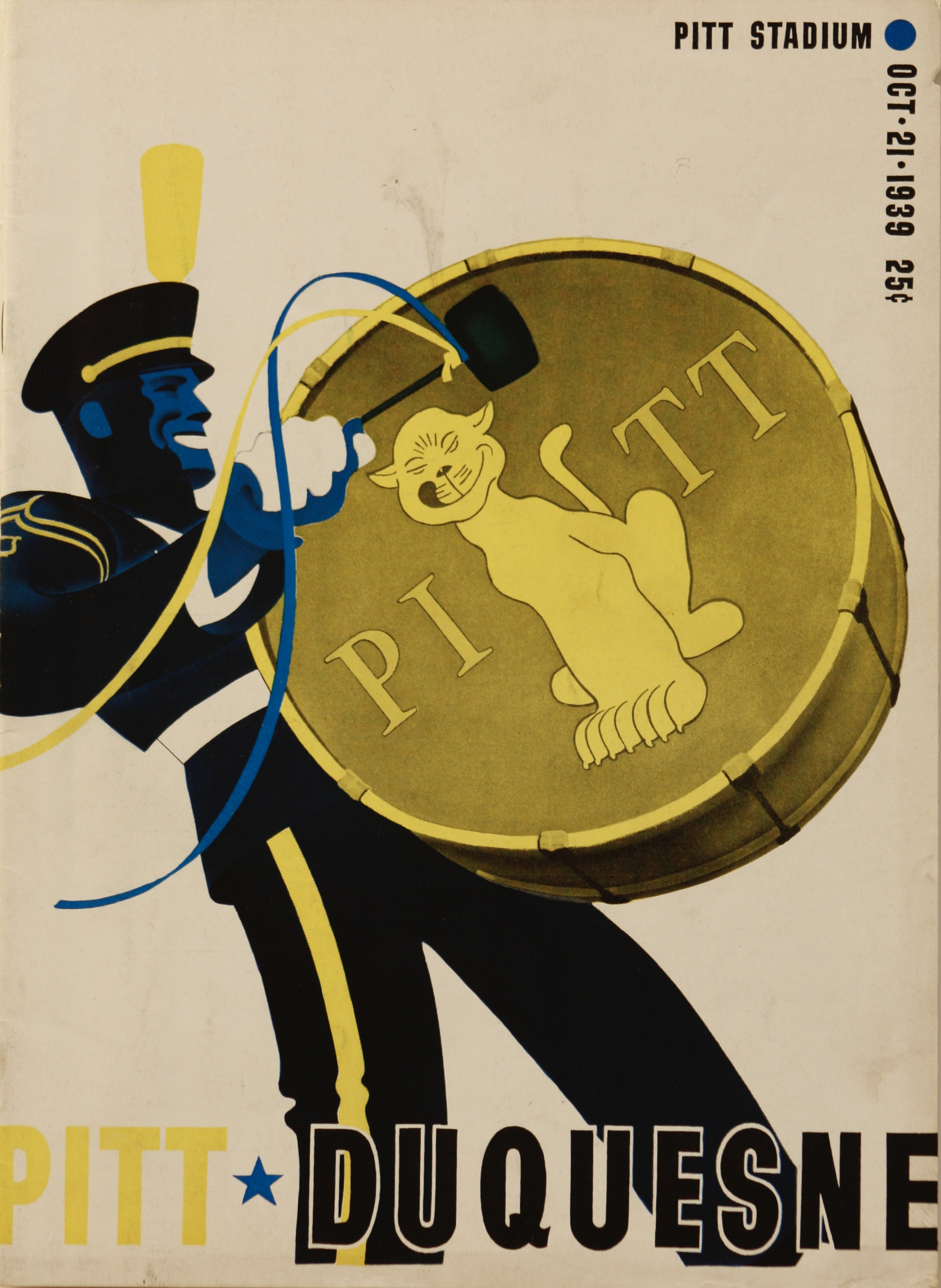
Program for the October 21 game vs. Pitt

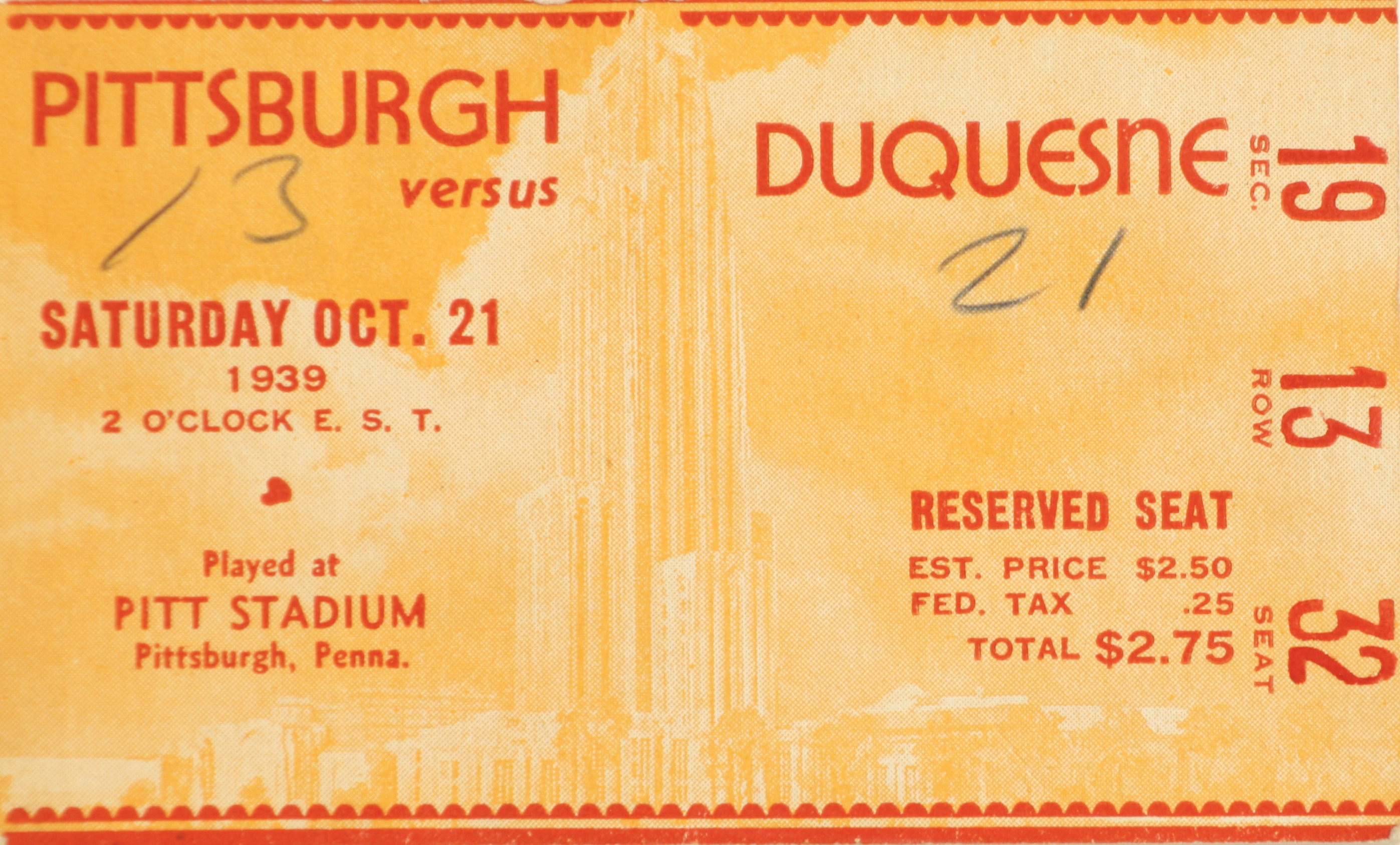
Ticket stub for October 21 game vs. Pitt

On October 21, 1939, the Pitt Panthers and Duquesne Dukes played their final football game. The athletic department felt that the Panthers needed to schedule teams from the Western Conference (Big Ten), so the intra-city series against the Dukes was scratched. Pitt led the series 5–1. Duquesne's only victory was a 7–0 upset in 1936. Jack Sell of the Post-Gazette felt that the situation was ripe for another Duquesne upset since Pitt had played three hard games, and was looking ahead to a game at Fordham the following week. Donelli's Dukes were undefeated and unscored upon with victories over Illinois Wesleyan (31–0), Waynesburg (20–0) and Manhattan (7–0).

In front of a disappointing crowd of 23,000 fans, Pitt scored two touchdowns in the opening quarter to take a 13–0 lead. The Duquesne Dukes then scored the final 21 points of the contest to upset the No. 1 Panthers, 21–13. After 13 minutes of exchanging punts to gain field position, Pitt scored twice in 1 minute and 20 seconds. Pitt end Joe Rettinger blocked a Carl Nery punt that fell out of bounds on the Duquesne eight-yard line. On third down Ernest Bonelli went over center for the touchdown. Ben Kish's placement kick went wide left. Duquesne returned the kickoff to their nine-yard line, so they punted on first down. Pitt gained possession on their own 47-yard line. On first down Bonelli picked up 34 yards. Then Emil Narick passed 19-yards to Joe Rettinger for the touchdown, Rettinger added the point after. Late in the second quarter Pitt's James Thurbon shanked a punt and the Dukes gained possession on the Panthers' 26-yard line. A 20-yard pass completion followed by a 5-yard penalty placed the ball on the 1-yard line. 15 seconds before halftime, George Gonda scored the touchdown and Carl Nery added the point. The third quarter was scoreless, but Duquesne had possession in Pitt territory as the fourth period started. The Dukes punted and Pitt was backed up on their 18-yard line. An errant center snap bounced off of Cassiano's shoulder and into the arms of Duquesne end John Yacina. He ran unmolested for the score and John Rokiskey's placement put the Dukes ahead 14 to 13. The last gasp Panther offensive drive ended when they failed to convert a fourth down and 2 to go on the Duquesne 37-yard line. The Duquesne offense responded with an 8-play 63-yard drive. Philip Ahwesh completed a 19-yard pass to Rokiskey for the touchdown and Rokiskey added the placement to complete the upset.

Donelli told The Press: "I can't say too much about how this team came from behind, after trailing by 13 points. Most of our boys had never been behind in a varsity game, and the way they continued to fight for all they were worth represents more than all the victories in the world. That was victory in itself."

Coach Bowser stated: "Sometimes you're up, and then again – well, we weren't up today. Duquesne just outplayed us, I guess." Dick Cassiano added: "I guess we can't expect to win every time. But gosh, of all the games to lose – this is the toughest one to take."

Scoring summary

Quarter	Time	Drive			Team	Scoring information	Score	
Quarter	Time	Plays	Yards	TOP	Team	Scoring information	Duquesne	Pittsburgh
1		3	8		Pittsburgh	Ernest Bonelli 1-yard touchdown run, Ben Kish kick no good	0	6
1		2	53		Pittsburgh	Joe Rettinger 19-yard touchdown reception from Emil Narick, Joe Rettinger kick good	0	13
2		4	26		Duquesne	George Gonda 1-yard touchdown run, John Rokisky kick good	7	13
4		1	18		Duquesne	Fumble recovery returned 18 yards for touchdown by John Yacina, John Rokisky kick good	14	13
4		8	63		Duquesne	John Rokisky 19-yard touchdown reception from Philip Ahwesh, John Rokisky kick good	21	13
"TOP" = time of possession. For other American football terms, see Glossary of American football.							21	13
