= 1939 Villanova Wildcats football team =

American college football season

1939 Villanova Wildcats football
- Conference: Independent
- Head coach: Clipper Smith (4th season)
- Captain: Andrew Chisick
- Home stadium: Shibe Park, Villanova Stadium

1939 Eastern college football independents records
	Conf.			Overall
Team	W	L	T	W		L		T
No. 4 Cornell		–		8	–	0	–	0
No. 10 Duquesne		–		8	–	0	–	1
Swarthmore		–		6	–	0	–	1
Scranton		–		7	–	0	–	2
Princeton		–		7	–	1	–	0
La Salle		–		6	–	1	–	1
Penn State		–		5	–	1	–	2
No. 11 Boston College		–		9	–	2	–	0
No. 17 Fordham		–		6	–	2	–	0
Villanova		–		6	–	2	–	0
Boston University		–		5	–	3	–	0
Brown		–		5	–	3	–	1
Dartmouth		–		5	–	3	–	1
Hofstra		–		4	–	3	–	0
NYU		–		5	–	4	–	0
Pittsburgh		–		5	–	4	–	0
Harvard		–		4	–	4	–	0
Manhattan		–		4	–	4	–	0
Penn		–		4	–	4	–	0
Syracuse		–		3	–	3	–	2
Vermont		–		3	–	3	–	2
Tufts		–		3	–	4	–	1
Yale		–		3	–	4	–	1
Army		–		3	–	4	–	2
Bucknell		–		3	–	5	–	0
Carnegie Tech		–		3	–	5	–	0
Providence		–		3	–	5	–	0
Columbia		–		2	–	4	–	2
Massachusetts State		–		2	–	5	–	2
Colgate		–		2	–	5	–	1
Temple		–		2	–	7	–	0
CCNY		–		1	–	7	–	0
Buffalo		–		0	–	7	–	0
Rankings from AP Poll

The 1939 Villanova Wildcats football team represented the Villanova University during the 1939 college football season. The head coach was Clipper Smith, coaching his fourth season with the Wildcats. The team played their home games at Villanova Stadium in Villanova, Pennsylvania.

Villanova was not ranked in the final AP poll, but it was ranked at No. 34 in the 1939 Williamson System ratings, and at No. 32 in the Litkenhous Ratings.

== Schedule ==
Date	Opponent	Site	Result	Attendance	Source
September 30	Muhlenberg	Villanova Stadium; Villanova, PA	W 14–0		
October 6	South Carolina	Shibe Park; Philadelphia, PA	W 40–0	25,000	
October 14	at Texas A&M	Tyler High School; Tyler, TX (Rose Festival Classic)	L 7–33	14,000	
October 28	Arkansas	Shibe Park; Philadelphia, PA	W 7–0	22,000	
November 4	at Detroit	University of Detroit Stadium; Detroit, MI	W 13–6		
November 11	at Auburn	Legion Field; Birmingham, AL	L 9–10	15,000	
November 18	at Temple	Temple Stadium; Philadelphia, PA	W 12–6		
November 25	at Manhattan	Polo Grounds; New York, NY	W 7–0	9,951	
