= 1939 Scranton Tomcats football team =

American college football season

1939 Scranton Tomcats football
- Conference: Independent
- Record: 7–0–2
- Head coach: Tom Davies (3rd season)
- Home stadium: Athletic Park

1939 Eastern college football independents records
	Conf.			Overall
Team	W	L	T	W		L		T
No. 4 Cornell		–		8	–	0	–	0
No. 10 Duquesne		–		8	–	0	–	1
Swarthmore		–		6	–	0	–	1
Scranton		–		7	–	0	–	2
Princeton		–		7	–	1	–	0
La Salle		–		6	–	1	–	1
Penn State		–		5	–	1	–	2
No. 11 Boston College		–		9	–	2	–	0
No. 17 Fordham		–		6	–	2	–	0
Villanova		–		6	–	2	–	0
Boston University		–		5	–	3	–	0
Brown		–		5	–	3	–	1
Dartmouth		–		5	–	3	–	1
Hofstra		–		4	–	3	–	0
NYU		–		5	–	4	–	0
Pittsburgh		–		5	–	4	–	0
Harvard		–		4	–	4	–	0
Manhattan		–		4	–	4	–	0
Penn		–		4	–	4	–	0
Syracuse		–		3	–	3	–	2
Vermont		–		3	–	3	–	2
Tufts		–		3	–	4	–	1
Yale		–		3	–	4	–	1
Army		–		3	–	4	–	2
Bucknell		–		3	–	5	–	0
Carnegie Tech		–		3	–	5	–	0
Providence		–		3	–	5	–	0
Columbia		–		2	–	4	–	2
Massachusetts State		–		2	–	5	–	2
Colgate		–		2	–	5	–	1
Temple		–		2	–	7	–	0
CCNY		–		1	–	7	–	0
Buffalo		–		0	–	7	–	0
Rankings from AP Poll

The 1939 Scranton Tomcats football team was an American football team that represented the University of Scranton during the 1939 college football season. The team compiled a 7–0–2 record, shut out five of nine opponents, and outscored all opponents by a total of 159 to 40. The team played its home games at Athletic Park in Scranton, Pennsylvania.

Scranton was ranked at No. 72 (out of 609 teams) in the final Litkenhous Ratings for 1939.

Tom Davies was the team's head coach for three years from 1937 to 1939. He left Scranton in March 1940 with a record of 20–3. He was inducted into the College Football Hall of Fame in 1970.

== Schedule ==
Date	Opponent	Site	Result	Attendance	Source
September 22	Saint Francis (PA)	Athletic Park; Scranton, PA	W 33–0	1,860	
October 1	Canisius	Athletic Park; Scranton, PA	T 0–0	1,500	
October 8	at La Salle	McCarthy Stadium; Philadelphia, PA	W 12–7	7,500	
October 14	at CCNY	Lewisohn Stadium; New York, NY	W 31–0	3,500	
October 20	Toledo	Athletic Park; Scranton, PA	W 7–6	5,000	
October 28	Marshall	Scranton, PA	W 20–0	4,000	
November 5	at Saint Vincent	Latrobe, PA	T 7–7	2,500	
November 12	at St. Bonaventure	Bradner Stadium; Olean, NY	W 28–0	2,500	
November 19	Niagara	Scranton, PA	W 21–20	6,300	
