= 1939 Syracuse Orangemen football team =

American college football season

1939 Syracuse Orangemen football
- Conference: Independent
- Record: 3–3–2
- Head coach: Ossie Solem (3rd season)
- Captains: Duffy Daugherty; William Hoffman
- Home stadium: Archbold Stadium

1939 Eastern college football independents records
	Conf.			Overall
Team	W	L	T	W		L		T
No. 4 Cornell		–		8	–	0	–	0
No. 10 Duquesne		–		8	–	0	–	1
Swarthmore		–		6	–	0	–	1
Scranton		–		7	–	0	–	2
Princeton		–		7	–	1	–	0
La Salle		–		6	–	1	–	1
Penn State		–		5	–	1	–	2
No. 11 Boston College		–		9	–	2	–	0
No. 17 Fordham		–		6	–	2	–	0
Villanova		–		6	–	2	–	0
Boston University		–		5	–	3	–	0
Brown		–		5	–	3	–	1
Dartmouth		–		5	–	3	–	1
Hofstra		–		4	–	3	–	0
NYU		–		5	–	4	–	0
Pittsburgh		–		5	–	4	–	0
Harvard		–		4	–	4	–	0
Manhattan		–		4	–	4	–	0
Penn		–		4	–	4	–	0
Syracuse		–		3	–	3	–	2
Vermont		–		3	–	3	–	2
Tufts		–		3	–	4	–	1
Yale		–		3	–	4	–	1
Army		–		3	–	4	–	2
Bucknell		–		3	–	5	–	0
Carnegie Tech		–		3	–	5	–	0
Providence		–		3	–	5	–	0
Columbia		–		2	–	4	–	2
Massachusetts State		–		2	–	5	–	2
Colgate		–		2	–	5	–	1
Temple		–		2	–	7	–	0
CCNY		–		1	–	7	–	0
Buffalo		–		0	–	7	–	0
Rankings from AP Poll

The 1939 Syracuse Orangemen football team represented Syracuse University as an independent during the 1939 college football season. The Orangemen were led by third-year head coach Ossie Solem and played their home games at Archbold Stadium in Syracuse, New York. The team was co-captained by guard Hugh "Duffy" Daugherty, who would later become a Hall-of-Fame-inducted coach at Michigan State. The Daily Orange predicted before the season that Syracuse will beat all the team except Duke.

The 1939 bout between Syracuse and Duke was a rout with Duke coming out on top 33-6. It was Gerald Courtney the Syracuse all-American who ran the only scoring goal down the sidelines for 74 yards. Gerald playing both sides of the ball both in offense and defense. The Charlotte Observer Sports was quoted saying "Gerald Courtney and his orange henchmen couldn't stop the Blue Devils". This was the second time these teams had met, and Syracuse had won the first meeting.

Syracuse was ranked at No. 75 (out of 609 teams) in the final Litkenhous Ratings for 1939.

== Schedule ==
Date	Opponent	Site	Result	Attendance	Source
September 29	Clarkson	Archbold Stadium; Syracuse, NY	W 12–0	15,000	
October 7	at Cornell	Schoellkopf Field; Ithaca, NY	L 6–19	24,000	
October 14	Georgetown	Archbold Stadium; Syracuse, NY	T 13–13	15,000	
October 21	at No. 13 Duke	Duke Stadium; Durham, NC	L 6–33	20,000–25,000	
October 28	Penn State	Archbold Stadium; Syracuse, NY (rivalry)	T 6–6	16,000	
November 4	Michigan State	Archbold Stadium; Syracuse, NY	L 3–14	16,000	
November 18	Colgate	Archbold Stadium; Syracuse, NY (rivalry)	W 7–0	28,000	
November 23	at Maryland	Byrd Stadium; College Park, MD	W 10–7	5,000	
Rankings from AP Poll released prior to the game
