= 1939 Canisius Golden Griffins football team =

American college football season

1939 Canisius Golden Griffins football

Little Three champion
- Conference: Western New York Little Three Conference
- Record: 4–1–1 (2–0 Little Three)
- Head coach: James B. Wilson (1st season)
- Home stadium: Civic Stadium

The 1939 Canisius Golden Griffins football team was an American football team that represented Canisius College in the Western New York Little Three Conference (Little Three) during the 1939 college football season. In their first year under head coach James B. Wilson, the Griffins compiled a 4–1–1 record (2–0 against conference opponents), shut out four of six opponents, won the Little Three championship, and outscored all opponents by a total of 66 to 21.

The team was led on offense by star halfback Tommy Colella. Colella was selected by Coller's Eye as a second-team player on the 1939 Little All-America college football team.

Canisius was ranked at No. 86 (out of 609 teams) in the final Litkenhous Ratings for 1939.

The team played its home games at Civic Stadium in Buffalo, New York.

== Schedule ==
Date	Opponent	Site	Result	Attendance	Source
October 1	at Scranton*	Athletic Park; Scranton, PA	T 0–0	1,500	
October 8	Niagara	Civic Stadium; Buffalo, NY	W 19–0	10,000	
October 29	at Saint Vincent*	Bearcat Stadium; Latrobe, PA	W 14–0	4,000	
November 5	St. Bonaventure	Civic Stadium; Buffalo, NY	W 10–0		
November 12	La Salle*	Civic Stadium; Buffalo, NY	L 3–14	13,500	
November 19	Saint Francis (PA)*	Civic Stadium; Buffalo, NY	W 20–7	10,000	
*Non-conference game
