= 1939 NYU Violets football team =

American college football season

1939 NYU Violets football
- Conference: Independent
- Record: 5–4
- Head coach: Mal Stevens (6th season)
- Home stadium: Ohio Field; Yankee Stadium

1939 Eastern college football independents records
	Conf.			Overall
Team	W	L	T	W		L		T
No. 4 Cornell		–		8	–	0	–	0
No. 10 Duquesne		–		8	–	0	–	1
Swarthmore		–		6	–	0	–	1
Scranton		–		7	–	0	–	2
Princeton		–		7	–	1	–	0
La Salle		–		6	–	1	–	1
Penn State		–		5	–	1	–	2
No. 11 Boston College		–		9	–	2	–	0
No. 17 Fordham		–		6	–	2	–	0
Villanova		–		6	–	2	–	0
Boston University		–		5	–	3	–	0
Brown		–		5	–	3	–	1
Dartmouth		–		5	–	3	–	1
Hofstra		–		4	–	3	–	0
NYU		–		5	–	4	–	0
Pittsburgh		–		5	–	4	–	0
Harvard		–		4	–	4	–	0
Manhattan		–		4	–	4	–	0
Penn		–		4	–	4	–	0
Syracuse		–		3	–	3	–	2
Vermont		–		3	–	3	–	2
Tufts		–		3	–	4	–	1
Yale		–		3	–	4	–	1
Army		–		3	–	4	–	2
Bucknell		–		3	–	5	–	0
Carnegie Tech		–		3	–	5	–	0
Providence		–		3	–	5	–	0
Columbia		–		2	–	4	–	2
Massachusetts State		–		2	–	5	–	2
Colgate		–		2	–	5	–	1
Temple		–		2	–	7	–	0
CCNY		–		1	–	7	–	0
Buffalo		–		0	–	7	–	0
Rankings from AP Poll

The 1939 NYU Violets football team represented New York University in the 1939 college football season. In Mal Stevens's 6th season at NYU, the Violets compiled a 5–4 record, and managed to secure a place on the AP poll for the first and only time in program history for three weeks. They also defeated No. 15 Carnegie Tech 6–0 for their 2nd and final win over a ranked college football program, the other victory coming against #8 Fordham in 1936.

NYU was ranked at No. 49 (out of 609 teams) in the final Litkenhous Ratings for 1939.

== Schedule ==
Date	Opponent	Rank	Site	Result	Attendance	Source
September 30	at Colgate		Colgate Athletic Field; Hamilton, NY	W 7–6	8,000	
October 7	Pennsylvania Military		Ohio Field; Bronx, NY	W 43–0		
October 14	at North Carolina		Kenan Memorial Stadium; Chapel Hill, NC	L 7–14	20,000	
October 21	No. 15 Carnegie Tech		Yankee Stadium; Bronx, NY	W 6–0	25,000	
October 28	Georgia	No. 19	Yankee Stadium; Bronx, NY	W 14–13	15,000	
November 4	Lafayette	No. 17	Ohio Field; Bronx, NY	W 14–0		
November 11	Missouri	No. 17	Yankee Stadium; Bronx, NY	L 7–20	30,000	
November 18	Georgetown		Yankee Stadium; Bronx, NY	L 0–14	17,000	
December 2	vs. Fordham		Yankee Stadium; Bronx, NY	L 7–18	57,000	
Rankings from AP Poll released prior to the game
