= 1939 Fordham Rams football team =

American college football season

1939 Fordham Rams football
- Conference: Independent

Ranking
- AP: No. 17
- Record: 6–2
- Head coach: Jim Crowley (7th season)
- Home stadium: Polo Grounds

1939 Eastern college football independents records
	Conf.			Overall
Team	W	L	T	W		L		T
No. 4 Cornell		–		8	–	0	–	0
No. 10 Duquesne		–		8	–	0	–	1
Swarthmore		–		6	–	0	–	1
Scranton		–		7	–	0	–	2
Princeton		–		7	–	1	–	0
La Salle		–		6	–	1	–	1
Penn State		–		5	–	1	–	2
No. 11 Boston College		–		9	–	2	–	0
No. 17 Fordham		–		6	–	2	–	0
Villanova		–		6	–	2	–	0
Boston University		–		5	–	3	–	0
Brown		–		5	–	3	–	1
Dartmouth		–		5	–	3	–	1
Hofstra		–		4	–	3	–	0
NYU		–		5	–	4	–	0
Pittsburgh		–		5	–	4	–	0
Harvard		–		4	–	4	–	0
Manhattan		–		4	–	4	–	0
Penn		–		4	–	4	–	0
Syracuse		–		3	–	3	–	2
Vermont		–		3	–	3	–	2
Tufts		–		3	–	4	–	1
Yale		–		3	–	4	–	1
Army		–		3	–	4	–	2
Bucknell		–		3	–	5	–	0
Carnegie Tech		–		3	–	5	–	0
Providence		–		3	–	5	–	0
Columbia		–		2	–	4	–	2
Massachusetts State		–		2	–	5	–	2
Colgate		–		2	–	5	–	1
Temple		–		2	–	7	–	0
CCNY		–		1	–	7	–	0
Buffalo		–		0	–	7	–	0
Rankings from AP Poll

The 1939 Fordham Rams football team represented Fordham University as an independent during the 1939 college football season. Led by seventh-year head coach Jim Crowley, the Rams compiled a record of 6–2. The season opener against Waynesburg was the first college football game ever broadcast on television. Fordham played home games at the Polo Grounds in Manhattan.

== Schedule ==
Date	Opponent	Site	TV	Result	Attendance	Source
September 30	Waynesburg	Randall's Island Stadium; New York, NY	NBC	W 34–7	9,000	
October 7	Alabama	Polo Grounds; New York, NY		L 6–7	41,454	
October 14	at Tulane	Tulane Stadium; New Orleans, LA		L 0–7	43,000	
October 28	No. 18 Pittsburgh	Polo Grounds; New York, NY		W 27–13	36,218	
November 4	Rice	Polo Grounds; New York, NY		W 13–7	19,971	
November 11	Indiana	Polo Grounds; New York, NY		W 13–0	19,279	
November 18	Saint Mary's	Polo Grounds; New York, NY		W 13–0	34,800	
December 2	vs. NYU	Yankee Stadium; Bronx, NY		W 18–7	57,000	
Rankings from AP Poll released prior to the game
