= 1939 college football rankings =

- Season: 1939
- Bowl season: 1939–40 bowl games
- End of season champions: Texas A&M (Note: per AP poll, Boand System, Dunkel System, Houlgate System, Poling System, Williamson System, Berryman QPRS, Billingsley Report, College Football Researchers Association, DeVold System, Helms Athletic Foundation, National Championship Foundation, Sagarin Ratings Elo chess method); USC (Note: per Dickinson System); Cornell (Note: per Litkenhous Ratings and Sagarin Ratings Predictor method)

Various selection methods comprised 1939 college football rankings, including the AP Poll. Unlike most sports, college football's governing body, the NCAA, did not itself bestow a national championship.

== Champions (by ranking) ==
The AP Poll and most other rankings consider Texas A&M the season's champion. The Dickinson System considers USC the season's champion. Litkenhous Ratings and the Sagarin Ratings Predictor method consider Cornell to have been the season's chamnpion.

- AP poll: Texas A&M
- Berryman QPRS: Texas A&M
- Billingsley Report: Texas A&M
- Boand System: Texas A&M
- College Football Researchers Association: Texas A&M
- DeVold System Texas A&M
- Dickinson System: USC
- Dunkel System: Texas A&M
- Helms Athletic Foundation: Texas A&M
- Houlgate System: Texas A&M
- Litkenhous Ratings: Cornell
- National Championship Foundation: Texas A&M
- Poling System: Texas A&M
- Sagarin Ratings Elo chess method: Texas A&M
- Sagarin Ratings Predictor method: Cornell
- Williamson System: Texas A&M

Note: AP Poll, Boand System, Dickinson System, Dunkel System, Houlgate System, Litkenhous Ratings, Poling System, and Williamson System were given contemporarily. All other methods were given retroactively.

== AP Poll ==
=== Legend ===
| | Increase in ranking |
| | Decrease in ranking |
| | Not ranked previous week |
| | National champion |
| (#–#) | Win–loss record |
| (Italics) | Number of first place votes |
| т | Tied with team above or below also with this symbol |

The final AP Poll was released on December 11, at the end of the 1939 regular season, weeks before the major bowls. The AP would not release a post-bowl season final poll regularly until 1968.

| | Week 1 Oct 16 | Week 2 Oct 23 | Week 3 Oct 30 | Week 4 Nov 6 | Week 5 Nov 13 | Week 6 Nov 20 | Week 7 Nov 27 | Week 8 Dec 4 | Week 9 (Final) Dec 11 | |
|---|---|---|---|---|---|---|---|---|---|---|
| 1. | Pittsburgh (3–0) (25) | Tennessee (4–0) (83) | Tennessee (5–0) (67) | Tennessee (6–0) (81) | Tennessee (7–0) (66) | Texas A&M (9–0) (38) | Texas A&M (9–0) (27) т | Texas A&M (10–0) (28) | Texas A&M (10–0) (55) | 1. |
| 2. | Notre Dame (3–0) (16) | Notre Dame (4–0) (12) | Michigan (4–0) (20) | Texas A&M (7–0) (6) | Texas A&M (8–0) | Tennessee (8–0) (33) | USC (6–0–1) (25) т | Tennessee (9–0) (19) | Tennessee (10–0) (26) | 2. |
| 3. | Oklahoma (2–0–1) (10) | Michigan (3–0) (8) | Cornell (4–0) (18) | Notre Dame (6–0) (11) | USC (5–0–1) (10) | Cornell (7–0) (20) | Cornell (8–0) (34) | USC (7–0–1) (18) | USC (7–0–2) (9) | 3. |
| 4. | Tulane (3–0) (14) | Ohio State (3–0) (5) | Notre Dame (5–0) (12) | USC (4–0–1) (5) | Cornell (6–0) (3) | USC (5–0–1) (11) | Tennessee (8–0) (18) | Cornell (8–0) (15) | Cornell (8–0) (16) | 4. |
| 5. | Tennessee (3–0) (26.5) | Texas A&M (5–0) (6) | Texas A&M (6–0) (6) | Cornell (5–0) (1) | Oklahoma (6–0–1) (2) | Tulane (6–0–1) (3) | Tulane (7–0–1) (4) | Tulane (8–0–1) (5) | Tulane (8–0–1) | 5. |
| 6. | Michigan (2–0) (10) | Oklahoma (3–0–1) (2) | Oklahoma (4–0–1) (2) | Oklahoma (5–0–1) (3) | Tulane (5–0–1) (2) | Ohio State (6–1) (1) | Duquesne (8–0) | Duke (8–1) (1) | Missouri (8–1) | 6. |
| 7. | USC (2–0–1) | Cornell (3–0) (1) | USC (3–0–1) (1) | Tulane (4–0–1) | North Carolina (7–0–1) (1) | Notre Dame (7–1) | Duke (8–1) (2) | Missouri (8–1) | UCLA (6–0–4) | 7. |
| 8. | Alabama (3–0) (2.5) | USC (2–0–1) | Tulane (4–0–1) (1) | North Carolina (6–0–1) (1) | Ohio State (5–1) | Duke (7–1) (2) | Missouri (8–1) | Iowa (6–1–1) | Duke (8–1) (2) | 8. |
| 9. | Texas A&M (4–0) (5) | Tulane (3–0–1) (1) | North Carolina (5–0–1) (1) | Ohio State (4–1) | Notre Dame (6–1) | Iowa (6–1) (1) | Iowa (6–1–1) | UCLA (6–0–3) | Iowa (6–1–1) | 9. |
| 10. | Ohio State (2–0) (11) | Nebraska (3–0–1) | Nebraska (4–0–1) | Michigan (4–1) | Duquesne (7–0) | Missouri (7–1) | Holy Cross (7–1) | Duquesne (8–0–1) | Duquesne (8–0–1) | 10. |
| 11. | Oregon (2–0–1) (2) | Duquesne (4–0) | Oregon State (5–0) | UCLA (5–0–1) | UCLA (5–0–1) | Holy Cross (7–1) | Notre Dame (7–2) | Notre Dame (7–2) | Boston College (9–1) | 11. |
| 12. | Cornell (2–0) (1) | Duke (3–1) | Duke (4–1) | Duquesne (6–0) | Missouri (6–1) | Duquesne (7–0) | Ohio State (6–2) | Ohio State (6–2) | Clemson (8–1) | 12. |
| 13. | Duke (2–1) | North Carolina (4–0–1) | Duquesne (5–0) | SMU (3–1–1) | Duke (6–1) | UCLA (5–0–2) | UCLA (5–0–3) | Georgia Tech (7–2) | Notre Dame (7–2) | 13. |
| 14. | North Carolina (4–0) | Ole Miss (4–0) | Ohio State (3–1) | Dartmouth (5–0–1) | Santa Clara (4–1–2) | Oklahoma (6–1–1) | Clemson (8–1) (1) | Boston College (9–1) | Santa Clara (5–1–3) | 14. |
| 15. | Carnegie Tech (3–0) | Oregon State (4–0) | Kentucky (5–0) | Duke (5–1) | Iowa (5–1) | Clemson (7–1) (1) | Michigan (6–2) | Clemson (8–1) (1) | Ohio State (6–2) | 15. |
| 16. | Nebraska (2–0–1) | Penn (3–0) | SMU (2–1–1) | Santa Clara (3–1–2) | Clemson (6–1) (1) | Georgetown (7–0–1) | North Carolina (7–1–1) | Santa Clara (5–1–3) | Georgia Tech (8–2) | 16. |
| 17. | Ole Miss (3–0) | SMU (2–1–1) | NYU (4–1) | NYU (5–1) | SMU (3–2–1) | North Carolina (7–1–1) т | Georgetown (7–0–1) | Nebraska (7–1–1) | Fordham (6–2) | 17. |
| 18. | SMU (1–1–1) | Pittsburgh (3–1) | LSU (4–1) | Kentucky (5–0–1) | Holy Cross (6–1) | Santa Clara (4–1–3) т | Nebraska (7–1–1) | Fordham (6–2) т | Nebraska (7–1–1) | 18. |
| 19. | Baylor (3–0) | NYU (3–1) | Alabama (4–1) т | Ole Miss (5–1) | Oregon State (6–1) | Georgia Tech (5–2) т | San Jose State (12–0) | San Jose State (13–0) т | Oklahoma (6–2–1) | 19. |
| 20. | St. Mary's (2–0) | Alabama (3–1) | UCLA (4–0–1) т | Alabama (4–1–1) | Dartmouth (5–1–1) т; Minnesota (2–3–1) т | Princeton (6–1) т | Santa Clara (5–1–3) | Georgetown (7–0–1) | Michigan (6–2) | 20. |
| | Week 1 Oct 16 | Week 2 Oct 23 | Week 3 Oct 30 | Week 4 Nov 6 | Week 5 Nov 13 | Week 6 Nov 20 | Week 7 Nov 27 | Week 8 Dec 4 | Week 9 (Final) Dec 11 | |
| | | Dropped: Baylor; Carnegie Tech; Oregon; St. Mary's | Dropped: Ole Miss; Penn; Pittsburgh | Dropped: LSU; Nebraska; Oregon State | Dropped: Alabama; Kentucky; Michigan; Ole Miss; NYU | Dropped: Dartmouth; Minnesota; Oregon State; SMU | Dropped: Georgia Tech; Oklahoma; Princeton | Dropped: Holy Cross; Michigan; North Carolina | Dropped: Georgetown; San Jose State | |

== Boand System ==
The Boand System rankings (also known as "Azzi Ratem") were the only ratings released after the bowl games. Released in early January 1940, Boand's final rankings were as follows:

1. Texas A&M
2. Cornell
3. USC
4. Tulane
5. Duke
6. Tennessee
7. Georgia Tech
8. Clemson
9. Notre Dame
10. UCLA

== Dickinson System ==
The Dickinson System rankings released in December 1939 were as follows:

1. USC (25.73)
2. Texas A&M (25.43)
3. Cornell (25.26)
4. Tulane (23.61)
5. Tennessee (22.61)
6. Notre Dame (22.59)
7. Michigan (22.50)
8. Duke (22.34)
9. Missouri (22.29)
10. UCLA (21.91)
11. Iowa (21.02)
. Duquesne
. Georgia Tech
. Ohio State
. Princeton
. Santa Clara

== Litkenhous Ratings ==
The final Litkenhous Ratings released in December 1939 provided numerical rankings to more than 600 college football programs. The top 100 ranked teams were:

1. Cornell
2. Tennessee
3. Texas A&M
4. Tulane
5. Ohio State
6.Duke
7. North Carolina
8. Oklahoma
9. Minnesota
10. USC
11. Holy Cross
12. SMU
13. Fordham
14. Georgia Tech
15. Missouri
16. Michigan
17. Ole Miss
18. Boston College
19. Mississippi State
20. Clemson
21. Notre Dame
22. Alabama
23. Nebraska
24. Princeton
25. Santa Clara
26. Iowa
27. Kentucky
28. Wake Forest
29. Dartmouth
30. Northwestern
31. Duquesne
32. Villanova
33. Purdue
34. UCLA
35. Pittsburgh
36. Baylor
37. San Jose State
38. LSU
39. Auburn
40. Utah
41. Columbia
42. Georgetown
43. Texas
44. Detroit
45.
46. Arkansas
47. TCU
48. Penn
49. NYU
50. Oregon
51. Penn State
52. North Texas
53. Oregon State
54. Catholic Univ.
55. Carnegie Tech
56. Navy
57. Harvard
58. Colgate
59. Fresno State
60. Butler
61. Kansas State
62. Brown
63. Illinois
64. Marshall
65. Arizona State
66. Marquette
67. Saint Mary's (CA)
68. VMI
69. Georgia
70. Rice
71. Temple
72. Scranton
73. Yale
74. Michigan State
75. Syracuse
76. Richmond
77. Virginia
78. Wisconsin
79. George Washington
80. Gonzaga
81. Washington Univ.
82. Washington
83. Manhattan
84. Vanderbilt
85. Hardin–Simmons
86. Canisius
87. La Salle
88. Miami (FL)
89. Furman
90. Texas Tech
91. Army
92. San Francisco
93. Colorado Mines
94. Bucknell
95. Florida
96. San Diego Marines
97. Lafayette
98. Rollins
99. Oklahoma A&M
100. Tulsa

== Williamson System ==
The Williamson System rankings released in December 1939 were as follows:

1. Texas A&M
2. Tulane
3. Cornell
4. Tennessee
5. USC
6. Clemson
7. Duke
8. Missouri
9. Nebraska
10. Iowa
11. Boston College
12. Notre Dame
13. Georgia Tech
14. Princeton
15. UCLA
16. Oregon State
17. Alabama
18. Duquesne
19. Fordham
20. Penn
21. Oklahoma
22. SMU
23. Ohio State
24. Pittsburgh
25. Santa Clara
26. North Carolina
27. Purdue
28. Kentucky
29. Northwestern
30. Auburn
31. Mississippi State
32. Minnesota
33. Baylor
34. Villanova
35. Ole Miss
36. Michigan
37. St. Anselm
38. LSU
39. Catholic Univ.
40. Georgetown
41. Detroit
42. Holy Cross
43. San Jose State
44. Washington Univ.
45. Manhattan
46. Arkansas
47. Wake Forest
48. Texas
49. Oregon
50. Indiana

== See also ==
- 1939 College Football All-America Team
