= 1939 William & Mary Norfolk Division Braves football team =

American college football season

1939 William & Mary Norfolk Division Braves football
- Conference: Independent
- Record: 4–5
- Head coach: Tommy Scott (10th season)
- Home stadium: Foreman Field

1939 Southern college football independents records
	Conf.			Overall
Team	W	L	T	W		L		T
Georgetown		–		7	–	0	–	1
Catholic University		–		8	–	1	–	1
Hardin–Simmons		–		7	–	1	–	1
George Washington		–		5	–	3	–	0
Virginia		–		5	–	4	–	0
Georgia Teachers		–		5	–	5	–	0
Oklahoma City		–		4	–	4	–	2
Roanoke		–		4	–	4	–	0
Delaware State		–		2	–	2	–	0
William & Mary Norfolk		–		4	–	5	–	0
Navy		–		3	–	5	–	1
West Virginia		–		2	–	6	–	1
Western Maryland		–		1	–	6	–	0
Delaware		–		1	–	7	–	0
East Carolina		–		0	–	8	–	0

The 1939 William & Mary Norfolk Division Braves football team represented the Norfolk Division of the College of William & Mary, now referred to as Old Dominion University, during the 1939 college football season. They finished with a 4–5 record.

== Schedule ==
Date	Time	Opponent	Site	Result	Attendance	Source
September 29	3:00 p.m.	Richmond freshmen	Foreman Field; Norfolk, VA	L 0–12		
October 6	3:00 p.m	Apprentice	Foreman Field; Norfolk, VA	W 27–0		
October 14		at High Point	High Point, NC	L 0–7		
October 20		at Georgetown freshmen	Washington, DC	L 6–39		
October 28	2:00 p.m.	at East Carolina	Greenville, NC	W 7–0		
November 4		Norfolk NAS	Foreman Field; Norfolk, VA	W 25–6		
November 10	2:00 p.m.	Apprentice freshmen	Foreman Field; Norfolk, VA	W 26–0		
November 17	2:30 p.m.	NC State freshmen	Foreman Field; Norfolk, VA	L 6–16		
November 25	2:30 p.m.	William & Mary freshmen	Foreman Field; Norfolk, VA	L 13–19	2,000	
All times are in Eastern time
