= 1939 VPI Gobblers football team =

American college football season

1939 VPI Gobblers football
- Conference: Southern Conference
- Record: 4–5–1 (1–4–1 SoCon)
- Head coach: Henry Redd (8th season)
- Captain: David Marion Pitts
- Home stadium: Miles Stadium

1939 Southern Conference football standings
| | Conf. | | | | | Overall |
| Team | W | | L | | T | W | | L | | T |
|---|---|---|---|---|---|---|---|---|---|---|
| No. 8 Duke $ | 5 | – | 0 | – | 0 | 8 | – | 1 | – | 0 |
| No. 12 Clemson | 4 | – | 0 | – | 0 | 9 | – | 1 | – | 0 |
| William & Mary | 2 | – | 0 | – | 1 | 6 | – | 2 | – | 1 |
| North Carolina | 5 | – | 1 | – | 0 | 8 | – | 1 | – | 1 |
| VMI | 3 | – | 1 | – | 1 | 6 | – | 3 | – | 1 |
| Richmond | 3 | – | 1 | – | 1 | 7 | – | 1 | – | 2 |
| Furman | 3 | – | 3 | – | 0 | 5 | – | 4 | – | 0 |
| Wake Forest | 3 | – | 3 | – | 0 | 7 | – | 3 | – | 0 |
| NC State | 2 | – | 4 | – | 0 | 2 | – | 8 | – | 0 |
| Washington and Lee | 1 | – | 2 | – | 0 | 3 | – | 4 | – | 1 |
| South Carolina | 1 | – | 3 | – | 0 | 3 | – | 6 | – | 1 |
| VPI | 1 | – | 4 | – | 1 | 4 | – | 5 | – | 1 |
| Davidson | 1 | – | 7 | – | 0 | 2 | – | 7 | – | 0 |
| Maryland | 0 | – | 1 | – | 0 | 2 | – | 7 | – | 0 |
| The Citadel | 0 | – | 4 | – | 0 | 3 | – | 8 | – | 0 |
$ – Conference champion; Rankings from AP Poll

The 1939 VPI Gobblers football team represented Virginia Agricultural and Mechanical College and Polytechnic Institute in the 1939 college football season. The team was led by their head coach Henry Redd and finished with a record of four wins, five losses and one tie (4–5–1).

VPI was ranked at No. 110 (out of 609 teams) in the final Litkenhous Ratings for 1939.

== Schedule ==
| Date | Time | Opponent | Site | Result | Attendance | Source |
|---|---|---|---|---|---|---|
| September 23 | | Randolph–Macon* | Miles Stadium; Blacksburg, VA | W 26–0 | 2,500 | |
| September 30 | | at Marshall* | Fairfield Stadium; Huntington, WV | L 0–20 | 8,500 | |
| October 7 | 2:30 p.m. | vs. North Carolina | Foreman Field; Norfolk, VA | L 6–13 | 15,000 | |
| October 14 | 2:30 p.m. | vs. William & Mary | City Stadium; Richmond, VA | T 6–6 | 6,500 | |
| October 21 | | Centre*^{†} | Miles Stadium; Blacksburg, VA | W 28–0 | 3,500-4,000 | |
| October 28 | 2:30 p.m. | vs. Washington and Lee | Lynchburg Municipal Stadium; Lynchburg, VA | L 0–6 | 10,000-12,000 | |
| November 4 | 2:30 p.m. | Furman | Miles Stadium; Blacksburg, VA | W 20–7 | 2,500 | |
| November 11 | 2:30 p.m. | at Richmond | City Stadium; Richmond, VA | L 0–13 | 8,000 | |
| November 18 | | at Virginia* | Scott Stadium; Charlottesville, VA (rivalry) | W 13–0 | 8,000 | |
| November 23 | 2:15 p.m. | vs. VMI | Maher Field; Roanoke, VA (rivalry) | L 7–19 | 20,000 | |
*Non-conference game; ^{†}Homecoming; All times are in Eastern time

== Before the season ==
The 1938 VPI Gobblers football team compiled a 3–5–2 record and were led by Henry Redd in his seventh season as head coach. After the 1938 season, VPI lost ten letter winners due to graduation and another letter winner by withdrawal.

VPI started their preseason practices September 1st.

== Game summaries ==
=== Randolph–Macon ===
Randolph–Macon at VPI

| Team | 1 | 2 | 3 | 4 | Total |
|---|---|---|---|---|---|
| RM | 0 | 0 | 0 | 0 | 0 |
| • VPI | 6 | 7 | 7 | 6 | 26 |

- Date: September 23, 1939
- Location: Miles Stadium
  Blacksburg, VA
- Game attendance: 2,500
- Referee: Jake Miller (Davis & Elkins)

VPI's first game of the season was a victory over Randolph–Macon at Miles Stadium.

During the trip to Blacksburg, the manager for the Randolph–Macon team had a ruptured ulcer and had to be taken to the hospital.

The starting lineup for VPI was: Lawson (left end), Pitts (left tackle), Graves (left guard), Zydiak (center), Gosney (right guard), Coleman (right tackle), Willson (right end), Boswell (quarterback), Thomas (left halfback), Ellison (right halfback), Hudson (fullback). The substitutes were: Barnes, Buchanan, Clark, Cocker, DeBord, DeMuro, McCurdy, Rose, Shawhan, Smith, Streiff, B. Tate, W. Tate, Taylor, Traynham, Unterzuber, Warriner, Woolwine and Wycoff. Willard Henderson and Kern did not play due to injury.

The starting lineup for Randolph–Macon was: Robert Golubic (left end), Stuart Pugh (left tackle), R. Miller (left guard), George Chappell (center), Marshall Peterson (right guard), Dick Powell (right tackle), George Sawyer (right end), Billy Fox (quarterback), John Lovett (left halfback), Gordon Harrell (right halfback), Dick Irby (fullback). The substitutes were: James Cramer, Lewis, McDowell, Rawlings and Smith.

=== Marshall ===
VPI at Marshall

| Team | 1 | 2 | 3 | 4 | Total |
|---|---|---|---|---|---|
| VPI | 0 | 0 | 0 | 0 | 0 |
| • Marshall | 0 | 0 | 7 | 13 | 20 |

- Date: September 30, 1939
- Location: Fairfield Stadium
  Huntington, WV
- Game attendance: 8,500
- Game weather: "Steady drizzle"
- Referee: Ernst (Cincinnati)

After their victory over Randolph–Macon, VPI played Marshall College at Fairfield Stadium in Huntington, West Virginia.

The starting lineup for VPI was: Willson (left end), Coleman (left tackle), Graves (left guard), Zydiak (center), Gosney (right guard), Pitts (right tackle), Clark (right end), Boswell (quarterback), Ellison (left halfback), Thomas (right halfback), Warriner (fullback). Hudson and Henderson did not play due to injury.

The starting lineup for Marshall was: Bob Adkins (left end), Ed Ulinski (left tackle), John Boyd (left guard), Jim Roberts (center), Ray Truitt (right guard), Harold Cox (right tackle), Jack Mattiford (right end), Zach Kush (quarterback), Jackie Hunt (left halfback), Jack Morlock (right halfback), Ev Elkins (fullback). The substitutes were: Clyde Underwood.

=== North Carolina ===
North Carolina vs. VPI

| Team | 1 | 2 | 3 | 4 | Total |
|---|---|---|---|---|---|
| • UNC | 0 | 7 | 6 | 0 | 13 |
| VPI | 0 | 0 | 0 | 6 | 6 |

- Date: October 7, 1939
- Location: Foreman Field
  Norfolk, VA
- Game start: 2:30 p.m.
- Game attendance: 15,000
- Game weather: "Mid-summer heat"
- Referee: Dixon Foster

The starting lineup for VPI was: Clark (left end), Pitts (left tackle), Graves (left guard), Streiff (center), W. Tate (right guard), Gosney (right tackle), Willson (right end), Boswell (quarterback), Thomas (left halfback), Ellison (right halfback), Warriner (fullback). The substitutes were: Anderson, Cocker, Coleman, DeMuro, Willard Henderson, Hudson, Kern, Lawson, McCurdy, Rose, B. Tate, Taylor, Todd, Traynham, Unterzuber, Woolwine and Zydiak.

The starting lineup for North Carolina was: Paul Severin (left end), White (left tackle), Leroy Abernethy (left guard), Robert Smith (center), James Woodson (right guard), Claud Kimball (right tackle), James Mallory (right end), Jim Lalanne (quarterback), George Radman (left halfback), Mike Bobbitt (right halfback), Sydney Sadoff (fullback). The substitutes were: Charlie Baker, Don Baker, Blalock, Frank Doty, Harry Dunkle, Bill Faircloth, Grant, Sweet James, Gwynn Nowell, Stewart Richardson, Charles Slagle, Leo Slotnick, Bob Stoinoff and Carl Suntheimer.

=== William & Mary ===
William & Mary vs. VPI

| Team | 1 | 2 | 3 | 4 | Total |
|---|---|---|---|---|---|
| W&M | 6 | 0 | 0 | 0 | 6 |
| VPI | 0 | 0 | 6 | 0 | 6 |

- Date: October 14, 1939
- Location: City Stadium
  Richmond, VA
- Game start: 2:30 p.m.
- Game attendance: 6,500
- Referee: Paul Magoffin

The starting lineup for VPI was: Clark (left end), Pitts (left tackle), Graves (left guard), Zydiak (center), Gosney (right guard), Coleman (right tackle), Willson (right end), Boswell (quarterback), Thomas (left halfback), Ellison (right halfback), Warriner (fullback). The substitutes were: DeMuro, Henderson, Hudson, Rose, Streiff and Tate.

The starting lineup for William & Mary was: Charles Gondak (left end), Hank Whitehouse (left tackle), Buster Ramsey (left guard), Rudolph Tucker (center), John Brodka (right guard), John Dillard (right tackle), Alphonse Chestnut (right end), Mervyn Simpson (quarterback), Lloyd Phillips (left halfback), Waldo Matthews (right halfback), H. Hollingsworth (fullback). The substitutes were: Cary Berry, Harold Burchfield, Ed Goodlow, Jim Hickey, Carter Holbrook, Jimmy Howard, Hurlie Masters, George McComb and Clarence Twiddy.

=== Centre ===
Centre at VPI

| Team | 1 | 2 | 3 | 4 | Total |
|---|---|---|---|---|---|
| Centre | 0 | 0 | 0 | 0 | 0 |
| • VPI | 14 | 0 | 7 | 7 | 28 |

- Date: October 21, 1939
- Location: Miles Stadium
  Blacksburg, VA
- Game attendance: 3,500-4,000
- Referee: Richard Carrington (UVA)

VPI's 1939 homecoming game was a victory over the Centre Colonels.

The starting lineup for VPI was: Clark (left end), Pitts (left tackle), Graves (left guard), Zydiak (center), Gosney (right guard), Coleman (right tackle), Willson (right end), Boswell (quarterback), Thomas (left halfback), Ellison (right halfback), Warriner (fullback). The substitutes were: DeMuro and Taylor.

The starting lineup for Centre was: Schultz (left end), Lucian Cayce (left tackle), Dutch Herrick (left guard), Bill Hale (center), Jim Brakefield (right guard), Kyle (right tackle), Marlin Mays (right end), Bill Yates (quarterback), Red Smith (left halfback), Theodore Selin (right halfback), Roger Thompson (fullback).

=== Washington and Lee ===
Washington and Lee vs. VPI

| Team | 1 | 2 | 3 | 4 | Total |
|---|---|---|---|---|---|
| • W&L | 6 | 0 | 0 | 0 | 6 |
| VPI | 0 | 0 | 0 | 0 | 0 |

- Date: October 28, 1939
- Location: Lynchburg Municipal Stadium
  Lynchburg, VA
- Game start: 2:30 p.m.
- Game attendance: 10,000-12,000
- Referee: Richard Carrington (UVA)

The game against Washington & Lee on October 28 was the first game played at Lynchburg Municipal Stadium.

The starting lineup for VPI was: Lawson (left end), Pitts (left tackle), Graves (left guard), Zydiak (center), Gosney (right guard), Coleman (right tackle), Willson (right end), Boswell (quarterback), Thomas (left halfback), Ellison (right halfback), Warriner (fullback).

The starting lineup for Washington & Lee was: Howard Dobbins (left end), Richard "Dick" Boisseau (left tackle), Stephen Hanasik (left guard), John "Jack" Mangan (center), James Lindsey (right guard), Kelley Litteral (right tackle), Courtney Wadlington (right end), Dan Justice (quarterback), Charles Didier (left halfback), Preston Brown (right halfback), Alfred "Junie" Bishop (fullback). The substitutes were: Francis Sugrue and Taylor Truehart.

=== Furman ===
Furman at VPI

| Team | 1 | 2 | 3 | 4 | Total |
|---|---|---|---|---|---|
| Furman | 0 | 0 | 0 | 7 | 7 |
| • VPI | 12 | 0 | 6 | 2 | 20 |

- Date: November 4, 1939
- Location: Miles Stadium
  Blacksburg, VA
- Game start: 2:30 p.m.
- Game attendance: 2,500
- Game weather: "Snow-swept turf"

Before their match against Furman, VPI athletic director Monk Younger offered free tickets to the game to the first 13 people who brought him a black cat, in an effort to "slay the jinx that has denied Tech victory in two state games despite impressive yardage totals". The cats would then be released on the football field before the game.

The starting lineup for VPI was: Lawson (left end), Pitts (left tackle), Graves (left guard), Zydiak (center), Gosney (right guard), Coleman (right tackle), John Henderson (right end), Boswell (quarterback), DeMuro (left halfback), Ellison (right halfback), Warriner (fullback). The substitutes were: Thomas.

The starting lineup for Furman was: Lloyd Coley (left end), Sam Fleming (left tackle), Hugh Wofford (left guard), Johnson Moore (center), Gates Barker (right guard), Hinson (right tackle), Ray Dorman (right end), C. V. Lipscomb (quarterback), Joe Jenkins (left halfback), Dan Martin (right halfback), Rhoten Shetley (fullback). The substitutes were: Brevil and Robert Fitzer.

=== Richmond ===
VPI at Richmond

| Team | 1 | 2 | 3 | 4 | Total |
|---|---|---|---|---|---|
| VPI | 0 | 0 | 0 | 0 | 0 |
| • Richmond | 0 | 7 | 0 | 6 | 13 |

- Date: November 11, 1939
- Location: City Stadium
  Richmond, VA
- Game start: 2:30 p.m.
- Game attendance: 8,000
- Referee: Richard Carrington (UVA)

The starting lineup for VPI was: Lawson (left end), Pitts (left tackle), W. Tate (left guard), Streiff (center), Gosney (right guard), Coleman (right tackle), J. Hudson (right end), Kern (quarterback), Thomas (left halfback), DeMuro (right halfback), R. Hudson (fullback). The substitutes were: Anderson, Boswell, Clark, Ellison, Traynham, Warriner and Willson.

The starting lineup for Richmond was: Bill Burge (left end), Harold McVay (left tackle), Joseph Mack (left guard), Ed Merrick (center), Bert Milling (right guard), David Robertson (right tackle), Dick Humbert (right end), William Fitzhugh (quarterback), Art Jones (left halfback), Alec Moore (right halfback), Stuart Hoskins (fullback). The substitutes were: Joseph Amrhein, William Cash, Edners Dickinson, Wilson Faris, Fred Frohbose, Jack Powers, Gordon ReMine and Edward Sinar.

=== Virginia ===
VPI at Virginia

| Team | 1 | 2 | 3 | 4 | Total |
|---|---|---|---|---|---|
| • VPI | 6 | 0 | 0 | 7 | 13 |
| UVA | 0 | 0 | 0 | 0 | 0 |

- Date: November 18, 1939
- Location: Scott Stadium
  Charlottesville, VA
- Game attendance: 8,000
- Referee: Dixon Foster

The starting lineup for VPI was: Lawson (left end), Pitts (left tackle), Bill Tate (left guard), Streiff (center), Gosney (right guard), Coleman (right tackle), John Henderson (right end), Boswell (quarterback), Thomas (left halfback), Ellison (right halfback), Hudson (fullback). The substitutes were: Clark.

The starting lineup for Virginia was: James White (left end), Lee McLaughlin (left tackle), Herbert Winokur (left guard), Raymond Murden (center), John Sauerbeck (right guard), R. Walter Jones (right tackle), Nick Gianakos (right end), Mosby Cardozo (quarterback), Jim Gillette (left halfback), Sylvester O'Grince (right halfback), Leroy Neustedter (fullback).

=== VMI ===
VMI vs. VPI

| Team | 1 | 2 | 3 | 4 | Total |
|---|---|---|---|---|---|
| • VMI | 7 | 0 | 12 | 0 | 19 |
| VPI | 0 | 7 | 0 | 0 | 7 |

- Date: November 23, 1939
- Location: Maher Field
  Roanoke, VA
- Game start: 2:15 p.m.
- Game attendance: 20,000
- Game weather: "Brisk"
- Referee: T. G. Kain (Georgia)

The starting lineup for VPI was: Clark. (left end), Pitts (left tackle), Bill Tate (left guard), Streiff (center), Gosney (right guard), Coleman (right tackle), John Henderson (right end), Boswell (quarterback), Thomas (left halfback), DeMuro (right halfback), Warriner (fullback). The substitutes were: Anderson, Buchanan, Ellison, Graves, Hudson, Kern, Rose, Shawhan, Taylor, Traynham, Willson and Zydiak.

The starting lineup for VMI was: Gordon Irwin (left end), Byron Walker (left tackle), William Walker (left guard), George Atkison (center), Ray Reutt (right guard), Andy Nelson (right tackle), Luther Sexton (right end), James Shelby (quarterback), Nelson Catlett (left halfback), Paul Shu (right halfback), Edgar Carney (fullback). The substitutes were: Philip Chapman, Dale Heely, Johnson, John Larrick, Robert Mathews, Earl Mitchell, Bill Nugent, Bosh Pritchard, Roy Replogle, Barney Skladany, Harold Tipton and Thomas Thrasher.

== After the season ==
Multiple VPI players were named to the Associated Press All-State Team. They were Gosney (First Team), Warriner (First Team), Coleman (Second Team), Pitts (Second Team), Tate (Honorable Mention) and Zydiak (Honorable Mention).

In December 1939, the VPI letterwinners chose linemen Jim Coleman and John Henderson as co-captains of the 1940 VPI Gobblers football team.

== Players ==
=== Roster ===
VPI 1939 roster
| Quarterbacks: Dick Kern; Samuel B. Rose, Jr.; Guards: Cecil Anderson; Roland M. Cocker; Woodrow Gosney; Preston Graves; Joseph Franklin Smith; Bill Tate; John Charles Wycoff; Tackles: Jim Coleman; Frank L. DeBord, Jr.; Charles Thomas McCurdy; Dave Pitts (Capt.); Benjamin C. Tate; Andrew Wellington Todd; Ralph Travis Unterzuber | Centers: Graham Buchanan; Herbert Andrews Markle; Frank Streiff; Bill Zydiak; Ends: Gerald Clark; John Henderson; Lewis W. Kincaid; Bob Lawson; Dan Shawhan; Louis Willson | Halfbacks: William T. Barnes; Phil DeMuro; Sonny Ellison; Willard Joseph Henderson; William W. James; Sherwood A. Roudabush; Herbert Joseph Thomas; Albert Crawford Traynham; Garrett Ernest Taylor; Walter Trimble; James Walter Woolwine; Fullbacks: I. Ward Boswell; Rankin Hudson; George Warriner |

=== Varsity letter winners ===
Twenty-two players received varsity letters for their participation on the 1939 VPI team.

| Player | Hometown | Notes |
|---|---|---|
| Cecil Van Anderson | Andersonville, Virginia | World War II veteran (Major, Army Air Corps). |
| Irving Ward Boswell, Jr. | Arlington, Virginia | World War II, Korean War and Vietnam War veteran (Lieutenant Colonel, Air Force). |
| Graham Sullivan Buchanan, Jr. | Saltville, Virginia | World War II veteran (Major, Army). |
| Gerald Harley Clark | Bristol, Tennessee | |
| James Emory Coleman | Fayetteville, West Virginia | |
| Philip Galliano DeMuro | Passaic, New Jersey | |
| Matthew Leslie "Sonny" Ellison | Beckley, West Virginia | |
| H. Woodrow Gosney | Clarksburg, West Virginia | |
| Robert Preston Graves | Salem, Virginia | World War II and Vietnam War veteran (Colonel, Army). Awarded the Bronze Star Medal. |
| John L. Henderson | Sevierville, Tennessee | |
| Rankin McGuire Hudson | Sweetwater, Tennessee | |
| Richard Davis Kern | Winchester, Virginia | World War II veteran (Major, Army). Awarded the Bronze Star Medal and Purple Heart. |
| J. Robert "Bob" Lawson | Cambria, Virginia | |
| David Marion Pitts (Capt.) | Manassas, Virginia | |
| Daniel Green Shawhan | Washington, D.C. | World War II veteran (Lieutenant Colonel, Army). |
| Frank Arthur Streiff | Savannah, Georgia | World War II veteran (Lieutenant commander, Navy). |
| William Lee "Bill" Tate | Pulaski, Virginia | |
| Herbert Joseph Thomas | South Charleston, West Virginia | World War II veteran (Sergeant, Marines). Awarded the Medal of Honor. |
| Walter Haynes Trimble | Swoope, Virginia | World War II veteran (Army). |
| George Daniel Warriner | Montgomery County, Virginia | World War II veteran (Captain, Army). Awarded the Bronze Star Medal and Purple Heart. |
| Louis C. Willson | Blacksburg, Virginia | |
| William Daniel Zydiak | Manville, New Jersey | |

== Coaching and training staff ==
- Head coach: Henry Redd
- Assistant coaches
  - Backfield coach: Herbert McEver
  - Line coach: Sumner D. Tilson
- Manager: John Harrington
- Freshman coaches
  - Freshman head coach: Red Laird
  - Assistant freshman coach and trainer: Willard D. Altman
  - Assistant freshman coach and trainer: Thomas A. Slusser
