= 1939 North Carolina Tar Heels football team =

American college football season

1939 North Carolina Tar Heels football
- Conference: Southern Conference
- Record: 8–1–1 (5–1 SoCon)
- Head coach: Raymond Wolf (4th season)
- Captains: Snuffy Stirnweiss; Jim Woodson
- Home stadium: Kenan Memorial Stadium

1939 Southern Conference football standings
	Conf.					Overall
Team	W		L		T	W		L		T
No. 8 Duke $	5	–	0	–	0	8	–	1	–	0
No. 12 Clemson	4	–	0	–	0	9	–	1	–	0
William & Mary	2	–	0	–	1	6	–	2	–	1
North Carolina	5	–	1	–	0	8	–	1	–	1
VMI	3	–	1	–	1	6	–	3	–	1
Richmond	3	–	1	–	1	7	–	1	–	2
Furman	3	–	3	–	0	5	–	4	–	0
Wake Forest	3	–	3	–	0	7	–	3	–	0
NC State	2	–	4	–	0	2	–	8	–	0
Washington and Lee	1	–	2	–	0	3	–	4	–	1
South Carolina	1	–	3	–	0	3	–	6	–	1
VPI	1	–	4	–	1	4	–	5	–	1
Davidson	1	–	7	–	0	2	–	7	–	0
Maryland	0	–	1	–	0	2	–	7	–	0
The Citadel	0	–	4	–	0	3	–	8	–	0
$ – Conference champion; Rankings from AP Poll

The 1939 North Carolina Tar Heels football team represented the University of North Carolina at Chapel Hill during the 1939 college football season. The Tar Heels were led by fourth-year head coach Raymond Wolf and played their home games at Kenan Memorial Stadium. They competed as a member of the Southern Conference.

North Carolina was not ranked in the final AP poll, but it was ranked at No. 26 in the 1939 Williamson System ratings, and at No. 7 in the final Litkenhous Ratings for 1939.

Paul Severin was named a first-team All-American end by the Associated Press, and a second-team All-American by the NEA.

== Schedule ==
Date	Time	Opponent	Rank	Site	Result	Attendance	Source
September 23	2:30 p.m.	The Citadel		Kenan Memorial Stadium; Chapel Hill, NC	W 50–0	28,000	
September 30	2:30 p.m.	Wake Forest		Kenan Memorial Stadium; Chapel Hill, NC (rivalry)	W 36–6	18,000	
October 7	2:30 p.m.	vs. VPI		Foreman Field; Norfolk, VA	W 13–6	15,000	
October 14	2:30 p.m.	NYU*		Kenan Memorial Stadium; Chapel Hill, NC	W 14–7	20,000	
October 21	3:00 p.m.	at No. 4 Tulane*	No. 14	Tulane Stadium; New Orleans, LA	T 14–14	34,000	
October 28	2:00 p.m.	at No. 16 Penn*	No. 13	Franklin Field; Philadelphia, PA	W 30–6	55,000	
November 4	2:00 p.m.	NC State	No. 9	Kenan Memorial Stadium; Chapel Hill, NC (rivalry)	W 17–0	14,000	
November 11	2:00 p.m.	vs. Davidson	No. 8	Bowman Gray Stadium; Winston-Salem, NC	W 32–0	11,000	
November 18	2:00 p.m.	at No. 13 Duke	No. 7	Duke Stadium; Durham, NC (rivalry)	L 3–13	52,000	
November 30	2:00 p.	Virginia*	No. 16	Kenan Memorial Stadium; Chapel Hill, NC (South's Oldest Rivalry)	W 19–0		
*Non-conference game; Rankings from AP Poll released prior to the game; All times are in Eastern time
