= 1939 Georgia Teachers Blue Tide football team =

American college football season

1939 Georgia Teachers Blue Tide football
- Conference: Independent
- Record: 5–5
- Head coach: Crook Smith (11th season)
- Home stadium: Teachers College field

1939 Southern college football independents records
	Conf.			Overall
Team	W	L	T	W		L		T
Georgetown		–		7	–	0	–	1
Catholic University		–		8	–	1	–	1
Hardin–Simmons		–		7	–	1	–	1
George Washington		–		5	–	3	–	0
Virginia		–		5	–	4	–	0
Georgia Teachers		–		5	–	5	–	0
Oklahoma City		–		4	–	4	–	2
Roanoke		–		4	–	4	–	0
Delaware State		–		2	–	2	–	0
William & Mary Norfolk		–		4	–	5	–	0
Navy		–		3	–	5	–	1
West Virginia		–		2	–	6	–	1
Western Maryland		–		1	–	6	–	0
Delaware		–		1	–	7	–	0
East Carolina		–		0	–	8	–	0

The 1939 Georgia Teachers Blue Tide football team represented the Georgia Teachers College—now known as Georgia Southern University—during the 1939 college football season. The team was led by Crook Smith in his 11th year as head coach.

== Schedule ==
Date	Time	Opponent	Site	Result	Attendance	Source
September 29		at Stetson	Hulley Field; Deland, FL	L 0–19		
October 7		Jacksonville State	Statesboro, GA	W 13–0		
October 14		University of Havana	Statesboro, GA	W 14–0		
October 19		at Troy State	Wiregrass Stadium; Dothan, AL	L 6–7		
October 27		at South Georgia	Douglas, GA	L 6–12		
November 4	3:00 p.m.	Snead	Teachers College field; Statesboro, GA	W 13–7		
November 10	8:00 p.m.	at Middle Georgia	Wolverine Stadium; Cochran, GA	L 6–13		
November 18		at Appalachian State	College Field; Boone, NC (rivalry)	L 0–59		
November 23		Armstrong	Statesboro, GA	W 7–0		
December 9		University of Havana	Havana University stadium; Havana, Cuba	W 27–7	3,000	
All times are in Eastern time
