= 1939 Delaware Fightin' Blue Hens football team =

American college football season

1939 Delaware Fightin' Blue Hens football
- Conference: Independent
- Record: 1–7
- Head coach: Stephen Grenda (2nd season)
- Home stadium: Frazer Field

1939 Southern college football independents records
| | Conf. | | | Overall |
| Team | W | L | T | W | | L | | T |
|---|---|---|---|---|---|---|---|---|
| Georgetown | | – | | 7 | – | 0 | – | 1 |
| Catholic University | | – | | 8 | – | 1 | – | 1 |
| Hardin–Simmons | | – | | 7 | – | 1 | – | 1 |
| George Washington | | – | | 5 | – | 3 | – | 0 |
| Virginia | | – | | 5 | – | 4 | – | 0 |
| Georgia Teachers | | – | | 5 | – | 5 | – | 0 |
| Oklahoma City | | – | | 4 | – | 4 | – | 2 |
| Roanoke | | – | | 4 | – | 4 | – | 0 |
| Delaware State | | – | | 2 | – | 2 | – | 0 |
| William & Mary Norfolk | | – | | 4 | – | 5 | – | 0 |
| Navy | | – | | 3 | – | 5 | – | 1 |
| West Virginia | | – | | 2 | – | 6 | – | 1 |
| Western Maryland | | – | | 1 | – | 6 | – | 0 |
| Delaware | | – | | 1 | – | 7 | – | 0 |
| East Carolina | | – | | 0 | – | 8 | – | 0 |

The 1939 Delaware Fightin' Blue Hens football team was an American football team that represented the University of Delaware in the 1939 college football season. In their second and final season under head coach Stephen Grenda, the Blue Hens compiled a 1–7 record and were outscored by a total of 134 to 47.

Delaware was ranked at No. 441 in the final Litkenhous Ratings for 1939.

The team played its home games at Frazer Field in Newark, Delaware.

== Schedule ==
| Date | Opponent | Site | Result | Attendance | Source |
|---|---|---|---|---|---|
| October 7 | at Ursinus | Collegeville, PA | L 0–3 | | |
| October 14 | Dickinson | Frazer Field; Newark, DE | L 7–13 | | |
| October 21 | Lebanon Valley | Frazer Field; Newark, DE | L 6–7 | | |
| October 28 | Hampden–Sydney | Frazer Field; Newark, DE | L 6–26 | | |
| November 4 | at Randolph–Macon | Ashland, VA | L 0–26 | | |
| November 11 | vs. Pennsylvania Military | Convention Hall; Atlantic City, NJ (Armistice Day) | L 0–20 | 10,000 | |
| November 18 | at Lehigh | Taylor Stadium; Bethlehem, PA | L 7–39 | 4,000 | |
| November 25 | Washington College^{†} | Frazer Field; Newark, DE | W 21–0 | | |
^{†}Homecoming
