= 1939 Washington and Lee Generals football team =

American college football season

1939 Washington and Lee Generals football
- Conference: Southern Conference
- Record: 3–4–1 (1–2 SoCon)
- Head coach: Warren E. Tilson (7th season)
- Home stadium: Wilson Field

1939 Southern Conference football standings
	Conf.					Overall
Team	W		L		T	W		L		T
No. 8 Duke $	5	–	0	–	0	8	–	1	–	0
No. 12 Clemson	4	–	0	–	0	9	–	1	–	0
William & Mary	2	–	0	–	1	6	–	2	–	1
North Carolina	5	–	1	–	0	8	–	1	–	1
VMI	3	–	1	–	1	6	–	3	–	1
Richmond	3	–	1	–	1	7	–	1	–	2
Furman	3	–	3	–	0	5	–	4	–	0
Wake Forest	3	–	3	–	0	7	–	3	–	0
NC State	2	–	4	–	0	2	–	8	–	0
Washington and Lee	1	–	2	–	0	3	–	4	–	1
South Carolina	1	–	3	–	0	3	–	6	–	1
VPI	1	–	4	–	1	4	–	5	–	1
Davidson	1	–	7	–	0	2	–	7	–	0
Maryland	0	–	1	–	0	2	–	7	–	0
The Citadel	0	–	4	–	0	3	–	8	–	0
$ – Conference champion; Rankings from AP Poll

The 1939 Washington and Lee Generals football team was an American football team that represented Washington and Lee University during the 1939 college football season as a member of the Southern Conference. In their seventh year under head coach Warren E. Tilson, the team compiled an overall record of 3–4–1, with a mark of 1–2 in conference play.

Washington and Lee was ranked at No. 113 (out of 609 teams) in the final Litkenhous Ratings for 1939.

== Schedule ==
Date	Opponent	Site	Result	Attendance	Source
September 30	Sewanee*	Wilson Field; Lexington, VA	W 9–0	1,500	
October 7	Richmond	Wilson Field; Lexington, VA	L 0–7	2,500	
October 14	at Southwestern (TN)*	Crump Stadium; Memphis, TN	T 7–7	8,000	
October 21	vs. West Virginia*	Laidley Field; Charleston, WV	W 9–0		
October 28	vs. VPI	Municipal Stadium; Lynchburg, VA	W 6–0	12,000	
November 4	at Washington University*	Francis Field; St. Louis, MO	L 6–12	7,500	
November 10	Virginia*	Wilson Field; Lexington, VA	L 0–7		
November 18	at William & Mary	Cary Field; Williamsburg, VA	L 14–18	9,000	
*Non-conference game
