= 1939 East Carolina Pirates football team =

American college football season

1939 East Carolina Pirates football
- Conference: Independent
- Record: 0–8
- Head coach: O. A. Hankner (1st season)
- Home stadium: Guy Smith Stadium

1939 Southern college football independents records
| | Conf. | | | Overall |
| Team | W | L | T | W | | L | | T |
|---|---|---|---|---|---|---|---|---|
| Georgetown | | – | | 7 | – | 0 | – | 1 |
| Catholic University | | – | | 8 | – | 1 | – | 1 |
| Hardin–Simmons | | – | | 7 | – | 1 | – | 1 |
| George Washington | | – | | 5 | – | 3 | – | 0 |
| Virginia | | – | | 5 | – | 4 | – | 0 |
| Georgia Teachers | | – | | 5 | – | 5 | – | 0 |
| Oklahoma City | | – | | 4 | – | 4 | – | 2 |
| Roanoke | | – | | 4 | – | 4 | – | 0 |
| Delaware State | | – | | 2 | – | 2 | – | 0 |
| William & Mary Norfolk | | – | | 4 | – | 5 | – | 0 |
| Navy | | – | | 3 | – | 5 | – | 1 |
| West Virginia | | – | | 2 | – | 6 | – | 1 |
| Western Maryland | | – | | 1 | – | 6 | – | 0 |
| Delaware | | – | | 1 | – | 7 | – | 0 |
| East Carolina | | – | | 0 | – | 8 | – | 0 |

The 1939 East Carolina Pirates football team was an American football team that represented East Carolina Teachers College (now known as East Carolina University) as an independent during the 1939 college football season. In their only season under head coach O. A. Hankner, the team compiled a 0–8 record.

== Schedule ==
| Date | Time | Opponent | Site | Result | Source |
|---|---|---|---|---|---|
| September 30 | | at Kutztown | University Field; Kutztown, PA | L 6–20 | |
| October 7 | | Campbell | Guy Smith Stadium; Greenville, NC | L 0–13 | |
| October 14 | | at Naval Station Norfolk | Norfolk, VA | L 6–7 | |
| October 21 | | Western Carolina | Guy Smith Stadium; Greenville, NC | L 6–12 | |
| October 28 | 2:00 p.m. | William & Mary Norfolk Division | Guy Smith Stadium; Greenville, NC | L 0–7 | |
| November 11 | | at Guilford | Greensboro, NC | L 0–20 | |
| November 18 | | High Point | Guy Smith Stadium; Greenville, NC | L 0–25 | |
| November 25 | | at Appalachian State | Morganton, NC | L 0–64 | |
All times are in Eastern time
