= Stephen Grenda =

American football player and coach (1910–1971)

Stephen J. Grenda
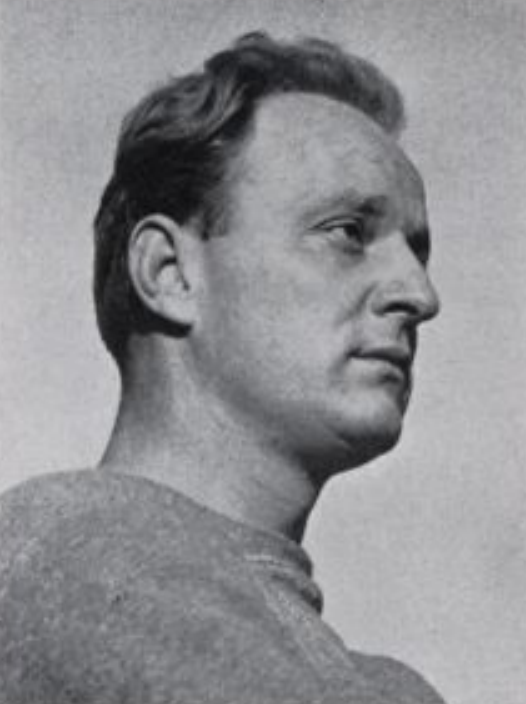
- Grenda pictured in The Blue Hen 1939, Delaware yearbook

Biographical details
- Born: May 23, 1910; Lawrence, Massachusetts, U.S.
- Died: September 21, 1971 (aged 61); Lewiston, Maine, U.S.
- Education: Columbia University (1930s)

Playing career
- 1931–1932: Columbia
- Position: Guard

Coaching career (HC unless noted)
- 1933–1936: Columbia (line)
- 1937: Blue Ridge College
- 1938–1939: Delaware

Head coaching record
- Overall: 4–12

Stephen J. Grenda (May 23, 1910 – September 21, 1971) was an American college football head coach who was Delaware football program's eighteenth head coach. He led them to a 4–12 overall record in two seasons.

== Head coaching record ==
Year	Team	Overall	Conference	Standing	Bowl/playoffs
Delaware Fightin' Blue Hens (Independent) (1938–1939)
1938	Delaware	3–5			
1939	Delaware	1–7			
Delaware:		4–12			
Total:		4–12			
