= 1939 George Washington Colonials football team =

American college football season

1939 George Washington Colonials football
- Conference: Independent
- Record: 5–3
- Head coach: Bill Reinhart (2nd season)
- Home stadium: Griffith Stadium

1939 Southern college football independents records
	Conf.			Overall
Team	W	L	T	W		L		T
Georgetown		–		7	–	0	–	1
Catholic University		–		8	–	1	–	1
Hardin–Simmons		–		7	–	1	–	1
George Washington		–		5	–	3	–	0
Virginia		–		5	–	4	–	0
Georgia Teachers		–		5	–	5	–	0
Oklahoma City		–		4	–	4	–	2
Roanoke		–		4	–	4	–	0
Delaware State		–		2	–	2	–	0
William & Mary Norfolk		–		4	–	5	–	0
Navy		–		3	–	5	–	1
West Virginia		–		2	–	6	–	1
Western Maryland		–		1	–	6	–	0
Delaware		–		1	–	7	–	0
East Carolina		–		0	–	8	–	0

The 1939 George Washington Colonials football team was an American football team that represented George Washington University as an independent during the 1939 college football season. In its second season under head coach Bill Reinhart, the team compiled a 5–3 record and outscored opponents by a total of 78 to 53.

George Washington was ranked at No. 79 (out of 609 teams) in the final Litkenhous Ratings for 1939.

== Schedule ==
Date	Opponent	Site	Result	Attendance	Source
October 7	Davis & Elkins	Griffith Stadium; Washington, DC	W 19–0		
October 14	at Butler	Sellick Bowl; Indianapolis, IN	L 6–13	6,000–7,500	
October 20	The Citadel	Griffith Stadium; Washington, DC	W 13–7		
October 28	vs. Georgetown	Griffith Stadium; Washington, DC	L 0–7		
November 3	Clemson	Griffith Stadium; Washington, DC	L 6–13		
November 18	at Kansas	Memorial Stadium; Lawrence, KS	W 14–7	5,000	
November 25	Bucknell	Griffith Stadium; Washington, DC	W 7–6	3,000	
December 2	at West Virginia	Mountaineer Field; Morgantown, WV	W 13–0		
