= 1939 Roanoke Maroons football team =

American college football season

1939 Roanoke Maroons football
- Conference: Independent
- Record: 4–4
- Head coach: Gordon C. White (10th season)
- Home stadium: College Field

1939 Southern college football independents records
	Conf.			Overall
Team	W	L	T	W		L		T
Georgetown		–		7	–	0	–	1
Catholic University		–		8	–	1	–	1
Hardin–Simmons		–		7	–	1	–	1
George Washington		–		5	–	3	–	0
Virginia		–		5	–	4	–	0
Georgia Teachers		–		5	–	5	–	0
Oklahoma City		–		4	–	4	–	2
Roanoke		–		4	–	4	–	0
Delaware State		–		2	–	2	–	0
William & Mary Norfolk		–		4	–	5	–	0
Navy		–		3	–	5	–	1
West Virginia		–		2	–	6	–	1
Western Maryland		–		1	–	6	–	0
Delaware		–		1	–	7	–	0
East Carolina		–		0	–	8	–	0

The 1939 Roanoke Maroons football team represented Roanoke College as an independent during the 1939 college football season. Led by 10th-year head coach Gordon C. White, the Maroons compiled an overall record of 4–4.

== Schedule ==
Date	Opponent	Site	Result	Attendance	Source
September 16	Lenoir–Rhyne	College Field; Salem, VA	L 0–13		
September 23	at VMI	Alumni Field; Lexington, VA	L 0–41	2,000	
October 2	Concord State	College Field; Salem, VA	L 12–14	1,500	
October 7	at Georgetown	Griffith Stadium; Washington, DC	L 0–25	10,000	
October 21	Randolph–Macon^{†}	College Field; Salem, VA	W 20–6	2,000	
October 28	Dickinson	College Field; Salem, VA	W 13–0		
November 10	at Apprentice	Apprentice Field; Newport News, VA	W 31–0	2,000	
November 17	at Catawba	Shuford Stadium; Salisbury, NC	W 12–7	1,500	
^{†}Homecoming
