= 1939 Davidson Wildcats football team =

American college football season

1939 Davidson Wildcats football
- Conference: Southern Conference
- Record: 2–7 (1–7 SoCon)
- Head coach: Gene McEver (4th season)
- Home stadium: Richardson Field

1939 Southern Conference football standings
	Conf.					Overall
Team	W		L		T	W		L		T
No. 8 Duke $	5	–	0	–	0	8	–	1	–	0
No. 12 Clemson	4	–	0	–	0	9	–	1	–	0
William & Mary	2	–	0	–	1	6	–	2	–	1
North Carolina	5	–	1	–	0	8	–	1	–	1
VMI	3	–	1	–	1	6	–	3	–	1
Richmond	3	–	1	–	1	7	–	1	–	2
Furman	3	–	3	–	0	5	–	4	–	0
Wake Forest	3	–	3	–	0	7	–	3	–	0
NC State	2	–	4	–	0	2	–	8	–	0
Washington and Lee	1	–	2	–	0	3	–	4	–	1
South Carolina	1	–	3	–	0	3	–	6	–	1
VPI	1	–	4	–	1	4	–	5	–	1
Davidson	1	–	7	–	0	2	–	7	–	0
Maryland	0	–	1	–	0	2	–	7	–	0
The Citadel	0	–	4	–	0	3	–	8	–	0
$ – Conference champion; Rankings from AP Poll

The 1939 Davidson Wildcats football team was an American football team that represented Davidson College during the 1939 college football season as a member of the Southern Conference. In their fourth year under head coach Gene McEver, the team compiled an overall record of 2–7, with a mark of 1–7 in conference play, and finished in 13th place in the SoCon.

== Schedule ==
Date	Opponent	Site	Result	Attendance	Source
September 23	vs. NC State	World War Memorial Stadium; Greensboro, NC	L 14–18	11,000	
September 30	Duke	Richardson Field; Davidson, NC	L 6–26	7,000	
October 7	vs. VMI	Mitchell Stadium; Bluefield, WV	L 0–2	2,500	
October 13	vs. South Carolina	Sumter County Fair Grounds; Sumter, SC	L 0–7	3,000	
October 28	Furman	Richardson Field; Davidson, NC	L 0–15		
November 4	The Citadel^{†}	Richardson Field; Davidson, NC	W 22–14	2,500	
November 11	vs. No. 8 North Carolina	Bowman Gray Stadium; Winston-Salem, NC	L 0–32	11,000	
November 18	Erskine*	Richardson Field; Davidson, NC	W 32–6	1,200	
November 30	vs. Wake Forest	American Legion Memorial Stadium; Charlotte, NC	L 7–46	10,000	
*Non-conference game; ^{†}Homecoming; Rankings from AP Poll released prior to the game
