= 1939 Delaware State Hornets football team =

American college football season

1939 Delaware State Hornets football
- Conference: Independent
- Record: 2–2
- Head coach: Unknown
- Home stadium: Soldier's Field

1939 Southern college football independents records
	Conf.			Overall
Team	W	L	T	W		L		T
Georgetown		–		7	–	0	–	1
Catholic University		–		8	–	1	–	1
Hardin–Simmons		–		7	–	1	–	1
George Washington		–		5	–	3	–	0
Virginia		–		5	–	4	–	0
Georgia Teachers		–		5	–	5	–	0
Oklahoma City		–		4	–	4	–	2
Roanoke		–		4	–	4	–	0
Delaware State		–		2	–	2	–	0
William & Mary Norfolk		–		4	–	5	–	0
Navy		–		3	–	5	–	1
West Virginia		–		2	–	6	–	1
Western Maryland		–		1	–	6	–	0
Delaware		–		1	–	7	–	0
East Carolina		–		0	–	8	–	0

The 1939 Delaware State Hornets football team represented the State College for Colored Students—now known as Delaware State University—in the 1939 college football season as an independent.

== Schedule ==
Date	Opponent	Site	Result	Source
October 14	at Princess Anne	Princess Anne, MD	W 7–0	
October 21	at Bordentown	Bordentown, NJ	L ?	
October 28	Storer	Soldier's Field; Dover, DE	W 24–0	
November 11	Cheyney	Soldier's Field; Dover, DE	L 7–12	
