= 1939 West Virginia Mountaineers football team =

American college football season

1939 West Virginia Mountaineers football
- Conference: Independent
- Record: 2–6–1
- Head coach: Marshall Glenn (3rd season)
- Captains: Albert Baisi; Harry Clarke
- Home stadium: Mountaineer Field

1939 Southern college football independents records
	Conf.			Overall
Team	W	L	T	W		L		T
Georgetown		–		7	–	0	–	1
Catholic University		–		8	–	1	–	1
Hardin–Simmons		–		7	–	1	–	1
George Washington		–		5	–	3	–	0
Virginia		–		5	–	4	–	0
Georgia Teachers		–		5	–	5	–	0
Oklahoma City		–		4	–	4	–	2
Roanoke		–		4	–	4	–	0
Delaware State		–		2	–	2	–	0
William & Mary Norfolk		–		4	–	5	–	0
Navy		–		3	–	5	–	1
West Virginia		–		2	–	6	–	1
Western Maryland		–		1	–	6	–	0
Delaware		–		1	–	7	–	0
East Carolina		–		0	–	8	–	0

The 1939 West Virginia Mountaineers football team was an American football team that represented West Virginia University as an independent during the 1939 college football season. In its third and final season under head coach Marshall Glenn, the team compiled a 2–6–1 record and was outscored by a total of 94 to 70. The team played its home games at Mountaineer Field in Morgantown, West Virginia. Albert Baisi and Harry Clarke were the team captains.

== Schedule ==
Date	Opponent	Site	Result	Attendance	Source
September 30	West Virginia Wesleyan	Mountaineer Field; Morgantown, WV	W 44–0	7,000	
October 7	at Pittsburgh	Pitt Stadium; Pittsburgh, PA (rivalry)	L 0–20	30,000	
October 14	at Cincinnati	Nippert Stadium; Cincinnati, OH	W 7–0	6,000	
October 21	vs. Washington and Lee	Laidley Field; Charleston, WV	L 0–9		
October 27	at South Carolina	County Fairgrounds; Orangeburg, SC	T 6–6		
November 4	at Georgetown	Griffith Stadium; Washington, DC	L 0–14		
November 11	Manhattan^{†}	Mountaineer Field; Morgantown, WV	L 7–19	10,000	
November 18	at Kentucky	McLean Stadium; Lexington, KY	L 6–13	8,000	
December 2	George Washington	Mountaineer Field; Morgantown, WV	L 0–13		
^{†}Homecoming
