= 1939 The Citadel Bulldogs football team =

American college football season

1939 The Citadel Bulldogs football
- Conference: Southern Conference
- Record: 3–8 (0–4 SoCon)
- Head coach: Tatum Gressette (8th season)
- Home stadium: Johnson Hagood Stadium

1939 Southern Conference football standings
	Conf.					Overall
Team	W		L		T	W		L		T
No. 8 Duke $	5	–	0	–	0	8	–	1	–	0
No. 12 Clemson	4	–	0	–	0	9	–	1	–	0
William & Mary	2	–	0	–	1	6	–	2	–	1
North Carolina	5	–	1	–	0	8	–	1	–	1
VMI	3	–	1	–	1	6	–	3	–	1
Richmond	3	–	1	–	1	7	–	1	–	2
Furman	3	–	3	–	0	5	–	4	–	0
Wake Forest	3	–	3	–	0	7	–	3	–	0
NC State	2	–	4	–	0	2	–	8	–	0
Washington and Lee	1	–	2	–	0	3	–	4	–	1
South Carolina	1	–	3	–	0	3	–	6	–	1
VPI	1	–	4	–	1	4	–	5	–	1
Davidson	1	–	7	–	0	2	–	7	–	0
Maryland	0	–	1	–	0	2	–	7	–	0
The Citadel	0	–	4	–	0	3	–	8	–	0
$ – Conference champion; Rankings from AP Poll

The 1939 The Citadel Bulldogs football team represented The Citadel, The Military College of South Carolina in the 1939 college football season. Tatum Gressette served as head coach for the eighth season. The Bulldogs played as members of the Southern Conference and played home games at Johnson Hagood Stadium.

The Citadel was ranked at No. 175 (out of 609 teams) in the final Litkenhous Ratings for 1939.

== Schedule ==
Date	Opponent	Site	Result	Attendance	Source
September 23	at North Carolina*	Kenan Memorial Stadium; Chapel Hill, NC	L 0–50	28,000	
September 30	at Georgia*	Sanford Stadium; Athens, GA	L 0–26	15,000	
October 6	Presbyterian*	Johnson Hagood Stadium; Charleston, SC	W 12–7	5,000	
October 14	Furman	Johnson Hagood Stadium; Charleston, SC (rivalry)	L 0–7		
October 20	at George Washington	Griffith Stadium; Washington, DC	L 7–13		
October 28	at Richmond	City Stadium; Richmond, VA	L 0–19	5,000	
November 4	at Davidson	Richardson Field; Davidson, NC	L 14–22	2,500	
November 11	at No. 1 Tennessee*	Shields–Watkins Field; Knoxville, TN	L 0–34	8,000	
November 18	Sewanee*	Johnson Hagood Stadium; Charleston, SC	L 7–14		
November 23	Erskine*	Johnson Hagood Stadium; Charleston, SC	W 34–0	4,000	
November 30	vs. Wofford*	Legion Stadium; Wilmington, NC (rivalry)	W 21–2		
*Non-conference game; Rankings from AP Poll released prior to the game

== NFL Draft selection ==
Year	Round	Pick	Overall	Name	Team	Position
1939	13	1	111	Andy Sabados	Chicago Cardinals	Guard
