= 1939 Hardin–Simmons Cowboys football team =

American college football season

1939 Hardin–Simmons Cowboys football
- Conference: Independent
- Record: 7–1–1
- Head coach: Frank Kimbrough (5th season)

1939 Southern college football independents records
	Conf.			Overall
Team	W	L	T	W		L		T
Georgetown		–		7	–	0	–	1
Catholic University		–		8	–	1	–	1
Hardin–Simmons		–		7	–	1	–	1
George Washington		–		5	–	3	–	0
Virginia		–		5	–	4	–	0
Georgia Teachers		–		5	–	5	–	0
Oklahoma City		–		4	–	4	–	2
Roanoke		–		4	–	4	–	0
Delaware State		–		2	–	2	–	0
William & Mary Norfolk		–		4	–	5	–	0
Navy		–		3	–	5	–	1
West Virginia		–		2	–	6	–	1
Western Maryland		–		1	–	6	–	0
Delaware		–		1	–	7	–	0
East Carolina		–		0	–	8	–	0

The 1939 Hardin–Simmons Cowboys football team was an American football team that represented Hardin–Simmons University as an independent during the 1939 college football season. In its fifth season under head coach Frank Kimbrough, the team compiled a 7–1–1 record and outscored opponents by a total of 137 to 54.

Hardin–Simmons was ranked at No. 85 (out of 609 teams) in the final Litkenhous Ratings for 1939.

== Schedule ==
Date	Opponent	Site	Result	Attendance	Source
September 23	at Centenary	Centenary College Stadium; Shreveport, LA	W 7–6		
September 29	at San Francisco	Seals Stadium; San Francisco, CA	T 6–6	5,000	
October 7	at Texas Mines	Kidd Field; El Paso, TX	W 12–0	5,000	
October 13	St. Edward's	Parramore Field; Abilene, TX	W 33–3		
October 27	at Loyola (CA)	Gilmore Stadium; Los Angeles, CA	L 0–6	15,000	
November 4	vs. Arizona State	Fly Field; Odessa, TX	W 19–7		
November 11	West Texas State	Parramore Field; Abilene, TX	W 18–13		
November 17	at New Mexico A&M	Quesenberry Field; Las Cruces, NM	W 28–13		
December 1	Howard Payne	Parramore Field; Abilene, TX	W 14–0		
