= 1939 Georgetown Hoyas football team =

American college football season

1939 Georgetown Hoyas football
- Conference: Independent
- Record: 7–0–1
- Head coach: Jack Hagerty (8th season)
- Captain: Game captains
- Home stadium: Griffith Stadium

1939 Southern college football independents records
	Conf.			Overall
Team	W	L	T	W		L		T
Georgetown		–		7	–	0	–	1
Catholic University		–		8	–	1	–	1
Hardin–Simmons		–		7	–	1	–	1
George Washington		–		5	–	3	–	0
Virginia		–		5	–	4	–	0
Georgia Teachers		–		5	–	5	–	0
Oklahoma City		–		4	–	4	–	2
Roanoke		–		4	–	4	–	0
Delaware State		–		2	–	2	–	0
William & Mary Norfolk		–		4	–	5	–	0
Navy		–		3	–	5	–	1
West Virginia		–		2	–	6	–	1
Western Maryland		–		1	–	6	–	0
Delaware		–		1	–	7	–	0
East Carolina		–		0	–	8	–	0

The 1939 Georgetown Hoyas football team was an American football team that represented Georgetown University as an independent during the 1939 college football season. In their eighth season under head coach Jack Hagerty, the Hoyas compiled a 7–0–1 record, shut out five of eight opponents, and outscored all opponents by a total of 109 to 22. The team was ranked No. 16 in the AP Poll of November 20 but dropped out of the final poll.

Georgetown was not ranked in the final AP poll, but it was ranked at No. 40 in the 1939 Williamson System ratings. and at No. 42 in the Litkenhous Ratings.

The team played its home games at Griffith Stadium in Washington, D.C.

== Schedule ==
Date	Opponent	Site	Result	Attendance	Source
September 29	at Temple	Temple Stadium; Philadelphia, PA	W 3–2	15,000	
October 7	Roanoke	Griffith Stadium; Washington, DC	W 25–0	10,000	
October 14	at Syracuse	Archbold Stadium; Syracuse, NY	T 13–13	15,000	
October 21	at Bucknell	Memorial Stadium; Lewisburg, PA	W 13–7		
October 28	George Washington	Griffith Stadium; Washington, DC	W 7–0		
November 4	West Virginia	Griffith Stadium; Washington, DC	W 14–0		
November 11	Maryland	Griffith Stadium; Washington, DC	W 20–0	15,500	
November 18	at NYU	Yankee Stadium; Bronx, NY	W 14–0	17,000	
