= 1939 Maryland Terrapins football team =

American college football season

1939 Maryland Terrapins football
- Conference: Southern Conference
- Record: 2–7 (0–1 SoCon)
- Head coach: Frank Dobson (4th season)
- Home stadium: Byrd Stadium (original)

1939 Southern Conference football standings
| | Conf. | | | | | Overall |
| Team | W | | L | | T | W | | L | | T |
|---|---|---|---|---|---|---|---|---|---|---|
| No. 8 Duke $ | 5 | – | 0 | – | 0 | 8 | – | 1 | – | 0 |
| No. 12 Clemson | 4 | – | 0 | – | 0 | 9 | – | 1 | – | 0 |
| William & Mary | 2 | – | 0 | – | 1 | 6 | – | 2 | – | 1 |
| North Carolina | 5 | – | 1 | – | 0 | 8 | – | 1 | – | 1 |
| VMI | 3 | – | 1 | – | 1 | 6 | – | 3 | – | 1 |
| Richmond | 3 | – | 1 | – | 1 | 7 | – | 1 | – | 2 |
| Furman | 3 | – | 3 | – | 0 | 5 | – | 4 | – | 0 |
| Wake Forest | 3 | – | 3 | – | 0 | 7 | – | 3 | – | 0 |
| NC State | 2 | – | 4 | – | 0 | 2 | – | 8 | – | 0 |
| Washington and Lee | 1 | – | 2 | – | 0 | 3 | – | 4 | – | 1 |
| South Carolina | 1 | – | 3 | – | 0 | 3 | – | 6 | – | 1 |
| VPI | 1 | – | 4 | – | 1 | 4 | – | 5 | – | 1 |
| Davidson | 1 | – | 7 | – | 0 | 2 | – | 7 | – | 0 |
| Maryland | 0 | – | 1 | – | 0 | 2 | – | 7 | – | 0 |
| The Citadel | 0 | – | 4 | – | 0 | 3 | – | 8 | – | 0 |
$ – Conference champion; Rankings from AP Poll

The 1939 Maryland Terrapins football team was an American football team that represented the University of Maryland in the Southern Conference (SoCon) during the 1939 college football season. In their fourth and final season under head coach Frank Dobson, the Terrapins compiled a 2–7 record (0–1 in conference), finished in 14th place in the SoCon, and were outscored by a total of 106 to 64.

Maryland was ranked at No. 135 (out of 609 teams) in the final Litkenhous Ratings for 1939.

== Schedule ==
| Date | Opponent | Site | Result | Attendance | Source |
|---|---|---|---|---|---|
| September 30 | Hampden–Sydney* | Byrd Stadium (original); College Park, MD | W 26–0 | | |
| October 7 | vs. Western Maryland* | Baltimore Stadium; Baltimore, MD | W 12–0 | 12,000 | |
| October 14 | at Virginia* | Scott Stadium; Charlottesville, VA (rivalry) | L 7–12 | 9,000 | |
| October 21 | at Rutgers* | Rutgers Stadium; Piscataway, NJ | L 12–25 | 8,500 | |
| October 28 | Florida*^{†} | Byrd Stadium; College Park, MD | L 0–14 | 10,000 | |
| November 4 | at Penn State* | New Beaver Field; State College, PA (rivalry) | L 0–12 | 7,000 | |
| November 11 | at Georgetown* | Griffith Stadium; Washington, DC | L 0–20 | 15,500 | |
| November 18 | vs. VMI | Foreman Field; Norfolk, VA | L 0–13 | | |
| November 23 | Syracuse* | Byrd Stadium; College Park, MD | L 7–10 | 5,000 | |
*Non-conference game; ^{†}Homecoming
