= 1939 Wake Forest Demon Deacons football team =

American college football season

1939 Wake Forest Demon Deacons football
- Conference: Southern Conference
- Record: 7–3 (3–3 SoCon)
- Head coach: Peahead Walker (3rd season)
- Captain: Rupert Pate
- Home stadium: Gore Field

1939 Southern Conference football standings
	Conf.					Overall
Team	W		L		T	W		L		T
No. 8 Duke $	5	–	0	–	0	8	–	1	–	0
No. 12 Clemson	4	–	0	–	0	9	–	1	–	0
William & Mary	2	–	0	–	1	6	–	2	–	1
North Carolina	5	–	1	–	0	8	–	1	–	1
VMI	3	–	1	–	1	6	–	3	–	1
Richmond	3	–	1	–	1	7	–	1	–	2
Furman	3	–	3	–	0	5	–	4	–	0
Wake Forest	3	–	3	–	0	7	–	3	–	0
NC State	2	–	4	–	0	2	–	8	–	0
Washington and Lee	1	–	2	–	0	3	–	4	–	1
South Carolina	1	–	3	–	0	3	–	6	–	1
VPI	1	–	4	–	1	4	–	5	–	1
Davidson	1	–	7	–	0	2	–	7	–	0
Maryland	0	–	1	–	0	2	–	7	–	0
The Citadel	0	–	4	–	0	3	–	8	–	0
$ – Conference champion; Rankings from AP Poll

The 1939 Wake Forest Demon Deacons football team was an American football team that represented Wake Forest University during the 1939 college football season. In its third season under head coach Peahead Walker, the team compiled a 7–3 record and finished in a tie for sixth place in the Southern Conference.

Wake Forest tackle Ruppert Pate was selected by the Associated Press as a first-team player on the 1939 All-Southern Conference football team.

Wake Forest was not ranked in the final AP poll, but it was ranked at No. 47 in the 1939 Williamson System ratings. and at No. 28 in the Litkenhous Ratings.

== Schedule ==
Date	Time	Opponent	Site	Result	Attendance	Source
September 16	8:00 p.m.	vs. Elon*	World War Memorial Stadium; Greensboro, NC	W 34–0	8,000	
September 23		South Carolina	Gore Field; Wake Forest, NC	W 19–7	10,000	
September 30		at North Carolina	Kenan Memorial Stadium; Chapel Hill, NC (rivalry)	L 6–36	18,000	
October 6		at Miami (FL)*	Burdine Stadium; Miami, FL	W 33–0	20,100	
October 14		at NC State	Riddick Stadium; Raleigh, NC (rivalry)	W 32–0	15,000	
October 21		Western Maryland*	Gore Field; Wake Forest, NC	W 66–0	7,000	
October 28		at No. 12 Duke	Duke Stadium; Durham, NC (rivalry)	L 0–6	16,000	
November 4		at Marshall*	Fairfield Stadium; Huntington, WV	W 14–13	8,000	
November 11		at Clemson	Riggs Field; Clemson, SC	L 7–20	12,000	
November 30		vs. Davidson	American Legion Memorial Stadium; Charlotte, NC	W 46–7	10,000	
*Non-conference game; Rankings from Coaches' Poll released prior to the game
