= 1939 VMI Keydets football team =

American college football season

1939 VMI Keydets football
- Conference: Southern Conference
- Record: 6–3–1 (3–1–1 SoCon)
- Head coach: Pooley Hubert (3rd season)
- Home stadium: Alumni Field

1939 Southern Conference football standings
	Conf.					Overall
Team	W		L		T	W		L		T
No. 8 Duke $	5	–	0	–	0	8	–	1	–	0
No. 12 Clemson	4	–	0	–	0	9	–	1	–	0
William & Mary	2	–	0	–	1	6	–	2	–	1
North Carolina	5	–	1	–	0	8	–	1	–	1
VMI	3	–	1	–	1	6	–	3	–	1
Richmond	3	–	1	–	1	7	–	1	–	2
Furman	3	–	3	–	0	5	–	4	–	0
Wake Forest	3	–	3	–	0	7	–	3	–	0
NC State	2	–	4	–	0	2	–	8	–	0
Washington and Lee	1	–	2	–	0	3	–	4	–	1
South Carolina	1	–	3	–	0	3	–	6	–	1
VPI	1	–	4	–	1	4	–	5	–	1
Davidson	1	–	7	–	0	2	–	7	–	0
Maryland	0	–	1	–	0	2	–	7	–	0
The Citadel	0	–	4	–	0	3	–	8	–	0
$ – Conference champion; Rankings from AP Poll

The 1939 VMI Keydets football team was an American football team that represented the Virginia Military Institute (VMI) during the 1939 college football season as a member of the Southern Conference. In their third year under head coach Pooley Hubert, the team compiled an overall record of 6–3–1.

VMI was ranked at No. 68 (out of 609 teams) in the final Litkenhous Ratings for 1939.

== Schedule ==
Date	Opponent	Site	Result	Attendance	Source
September 23	Roanoke*	Alumni Field; Lexington, VA	W 41–0	2,000	
September 30	at Kentucky*	McLean Stadium; Lexington, KY	L 0–21	5,000	
October 7	vs. Davidson	Mitchell Stadium; Bluefield, WV	W 2–0	2,500	
October 14	at Vanderbilt*	Dudley Field; Nashville, TN	W 20–13	5,000	
October 21	Virginia*	Alumni Field; Lexington, VA	W 16–13	9,000	
October 28	at Columbia*	Baker Field; New York, NY	L 7–26	12,000	
November 4	at Richmond	City Stadium; Richmond, VA (rivalry)	T 0–0	15,000	
November 11	No. 15 Duke	Wilson Field; Lexington, VA	L 7–20	12,000	
November 18	vs. Maryland	Foreman Field; Norfolk, VA	W 13–0		
November 23	vs. VPI	Maher Field; Roanoke, VA (rivalry)	W 19–7	20,000	
*Non-conference game; Rankings from AP Poll released prior to the game
