= 1939 Virginia Cavaliers football team =

American college football season

1939 Virginia Cavaliers football
- Conference: Independent
- Record: 5–4
- Head coach: Frank Murray (3rd season)
- Captains: James Gillette Jr.; Harry McClaugherty
- Home stadium: Scott Stadium

1939 Southern college football independents records
	Conf.			Overall
Team	W	L	T	W		L		T
Georgetown		–		7	–	0	–	1
Catholic University		–		8	–	1	–	1
Hardin–Simmons		–		7	–	1	–	1
George Washington		–		5	–	3	–	0
Virginia		–		5	–	4	–	0
Georgia Teachers		–		5	–	5	–	0
Oklahoma City		–		4	–	4	–	2
Roanoke		–		4	–	4	–	0
Delaware State		–		2	–	2	–	0
William & Mary Norfolk		–		4	–	5	–	0
Navy		–		3	–	5	–	1
West Virginia		–		2	–	6	–	1
Western Maryland		–		1	–	6	–	0
Delaware		–		1	–	7	–	0
East Carolina		–		0	–	8	–	0

The 1939 Virginia Cavaliers football team represented the University of Virginia during the 1939 college football season. The Cavaliers were led by third-year head coach Frank Murray and played their home games at Scott Stadium in Charlottesville, Virginia. They competed as independents, finishing with a record of 5–4.

Virginia was ranked at No. 77 (out of 609 teams) in the final Litkenhous Ratings for 1939.

== Schedule ==
Date	Opponent	Site	Result	Attendance	Source
September 23	Hampden–Sydney	Scott Stadium; Charlottesville, VA	W 26–0	7,000	
October 7	at Navy	Thompson Stadium; Annapolis, MD	L 12–14	22,000	
October 14	Maryland^{†}	Scott Stadium; Charlottesville, VA (rivalry)	W 12–7	9,000	
October 21	at VMI	Alumni Field; Lexington, VA	L 13–16	9,000	
October 28	vs. William & Mary	Foreman Field; Norfolk, VA	W 26–6	7,500	
November 4	Chicago	Scott Stadium; Charlottesville, VA	W 47–0	6,500	
November 10	at Washington and Lee	Wilson Field; Lexington, VA	W 7–0		
November 18	VPI	Scott Stadium; Charlottesville, VA (rivalry)	L 0–13	8,000	
November 30	at No. 16 North Carolina	Kenan Memorial Stadium; Chapel Hill, NC (rivalry)	L 0–19		
^{†}Homecoming; Rankings from AP Poll released prior to the game
