= 1939 Navy Midshipmen football team =

American college football season

1939 Navy Midshipmen football
- Conference: Independent
- Record: 3–5–1
- Head coach: Swede Larson (1st season)
- Captain: Allen Bergner
- Home stadium: Thompson Stadium

1939 Southern college football independents records
| | Conf. | | | Overall |
| Team | W | L | T | W | | L | | T |
|---|---|---|---|---|---|---|---|---|
| Georgetown | | – | | 7 | – | 0 | – | 1 |
| Catholic University | | – | | 8 | – | 1 | – | 1 |
| Hardin–Simmons | | – | | 7 | – | 1 | – | 1 |
| George Washington | | – | | 5 | – | 3 | – | 0 |
| Virginia | | – | | 5 | – | 4 | – | 0 |
| Georgia Teachers | | – | | 5 | – | 5 | – | 0 |
| Oklahoma City | | – | | 4 | – | 4 | – | 2 |
| Roanoke | | – | | 4 | – | 4 | – | 0 |
| Delaware State | | – | | 2 | – | 2 | – | 0 |
| William & Mary Norfolk | | – | | 4 | – | 5 | – | 0 |
| Navy | | – | | 3 | – | 5 | – | 1 |
| West Virginia | | – | | 2 | – | 6 | – | 1 |
| Western Maryland | | – | | 1 | – | 6 | – | 0 |
| Delaware | | – | | 1 | – | 7 | – | 0 |
| East Carolina | | – | | 0 | – | 8 | – | 0 |

The 1939 Navy Midshipmen football team represented the United States Naval Academy during the 1939 college football season. In their first season under head coach Swede Larson, the Midshipmen compiled a 3–5–1 record and were outscored by their opponents by a combined score of 107 to 88.

Navy was ranked at No. 56 (out of 609 teams) in the final Litkenhous Ratings for 1939.

== Schedule ==
| Date | Opponent | Site | Result | Attendance | Source |
|---|---|---|---|---|---|
| September 30 | William & Mary | Thompson Stadium; Annapolis, MD | W 31–6 | 20,000 | |
| October 7 | Virginia | Thompson Stadium; Annapolis, MD | W 14–12 | 22,000 | |
| October 14 | Dartmouth | Municipal Stadium; Baltimore, MD | T 0–0 | | |
| October 21 | vs. No. 2 Notre Dame | Municipal Stadium; Cleveland, OH (rivalry) | L 7–14 | 78,257 | |
| October 28 | Clemson | Thompson Stadium; Annapolis, MD | L 7–15 | 18,000 | |
| November 4 | at Penn | Franklin Field; Philadelphia, PA | L 6–13 | 70,000 | |
| November 11 | Columbia | Thompson Stadium; Annapolis, MD | L 13–19 | 17,300 | |
| November 25 | at Princeton | Palmer Stadium; Princeton, NJ | L 0–28 | 35,000 | |
| December 2 | vs. Army | Philadelphia Municipal Stadium; Philadelphia, PA (Army–Navy Game) | W 10–0 | 102,000 | |
Rankings from AP Poll released prior to the game
