= 1939 Appalachian State Mountaineers football team =

American college football season

1939 Appalachian State Mountaineers football

NSC co-champion
- Conference: North State Conference
- Record: 7–1–2 (3–0–1 NSC)
- Head coach: Flucie Stewart (1st season)
- Home stadium: College Field

1939 North State Conference football standings
| | Conf. | | | | | Overall |
| Team | W | | L | | T | W | | L | | T |
|---|---|---|---|---|---|---|---|---|---|---|
| Appalachian State + | 3 | – | 0 | – | 1 | 7 | – | 1 | – | 2 |
| Lenoir Rhyne + | 4 | – | 0 | – | 2 | 6 | – | 1 | – | 3 |
| Elon | 4 | – | 2 | – | 0 | 5 | – | 5 | – | 0 |
| Catawba | 2 | – | 1 | – | 1 | 6 | – | 2 | – | 2 |
| High Point | 2 | – | 4 | – | 0 | 4 | – | 6 | – | 0 |
| Western Carolina | 0 | – | 4 | – | 1 | 1 | – | 6 | – | 1 |
| Guilford | 0 | – | 4 | – | 1 | 1 | – | 7 | – | 1 |
+ – Conference co-champions

The 1939 Appalachian State Mountaineers football team was an American football team that represented Appalachian State Teachers College (now known as Appalachian State University) as a member of the North State Conference during the 1939 college football season. In their first year under head coach Flucie Stewart, the Mountaineers compiled an overall record of 7–1–2, with a mark of 3–0–1 in conference play, and finished as NSC co-champion.

== Schedule ==
| Date | Opponent | Site | Result | Source |
|---|---|---|---|---|
| September 23 | vs. Rollins* | Memorial Stadium; Asheville, NC | L 7–14 | |
| September 30 | Carson–Newman* | College Field; Boone, NC | W 21–0 | |
| October 6 | at Newberry* | Setzler Field; Newberry, SC | T 0–0 | |
| October 13 | Western Carolina | College Field; Boone, NC (rivalry) | W 54–7 | |
| October 20 | at High Point | High Point, NC | W 39–0 | |
| October 28 | King* | College Field; Boone, NC | W 12–0 | |
| November 4 | vs. Elon | World War Memorial Stadium; Greensboro, NC | W 7–6 | |
| November 10 | at Lenoir Rhyne | Moretz Stadium; Hickory, NC | T 6–6 | |
| November 17 | Georgia Teachers* | College Field; Boone, NC (rivalry) | W 59–0 | |
| November 25 | vs. East Carolina* | Morganton, NC | W 64–0 | |
*Non-conference game
