= 1939 South Carolina Gamecocks football team =

American college football season

1939 South Carolina Gamecocks football
- Conference: Southern Conference
- Record: 3–6–1 (1–3 SoCon)
- Head coach: Rex Enright (2nd season)
- Captains: J. B. Henson; Heber Stroud
- Home stadium: Carolina Municipal Stadium

1939 Southern Conference football standings
	Conf.					Overall
Team	W		L		T	W		L		T
No. 8 Duke $	5	–	0	–	0	8	–	1	–	0
No. 12 Clemson	4	–	0	–	0	9	–	1	–	0
William & Mary	2	–	0	–	1	6	–	2	–	1
North Carolina	5	–	1	–	0	8	–	1	–	1
VMI	3	–	1	–	1	6	–	3	–	1
Richmond	3	–	1	–	1	7	–	1	–	2
Furman	3	–	3	–	0	5	–	4	–	0
Wake Forest	3	–	3	–	0	7	–	3	–	0
NC State	2	–	4	–	0	2	–	8	–	0
Washington and Lee	1	–	2	–	0	3	–	4	–	1
South Carolina	1	–	3	–	0	3	–	6	–	1
VPI	1	–	4	–	1	4	–	5	–	1
Davidson	1	–	7	–	0	2	–	7	–	0
Maryland	0	–	1	–	0	2	–	7	–	0
The Citadel	0	–	4	–	0	3	–	8	–	0
$ – Conference champion; Rankings from AP Poll

The 1939 South Carolina Gamecocks football team was an American football team that represented the University of South Carolina as a member of the Southern Conference (SoCon) during the 1939 college football season. In their second season under head coach Rex Enright, the Gamecocks compiled an overall record of 3–6–1 with a mark of 1–3 in conference play, tying for 11th place in the SoCon.

South Carolina was ranked at No. 148 (out of 609 teams) in the final Litkenhous Ratings for 1939.

== Schedule ==
Date	Opponent	Site	Result	Attendance	Source
September 23	at Wake Forest	Gore Field; Wake Forest, NC	L 7–19	10,000	
September 29	Catholic University*	Carolina Municipal Stadium; Columbia, SC	L 0–12	7,000	
October 6	at Villanova*	Shibe Park; Philadelphia, PA	L 0–40	25,000	
October 13	Davidson	Sumter County Fair Grounds; Sumter, SC	W 7–0	3,000	
October 19	Clemson	Carolina Municipal Stadium; Columbia, SC (rivalry)	L 0–27	20,000	
October 27	West Virginia*	County Fairgrounds; Orangeburg, SC	T 6–6		
November 4	Florida*	Carolina Municipal Stadium; Columbia, SC	W 6–0	5,000	
November 11	Furman	Carolina Municipal Stadium; Columbia, SC	L 0–20	8,000	
November 18	at Georgia*	Sanford Stadium; Athens, GA (rivalry)	L 7–33	7,000	
November 25	Miami (FL)*	Carolina Municipal Stadium; Columbia, SC	W 7–6	5,000	
*Non-conference game
