= 1939 Clemson Tigers football team =

American college football season

1939 Clemson Tigers football
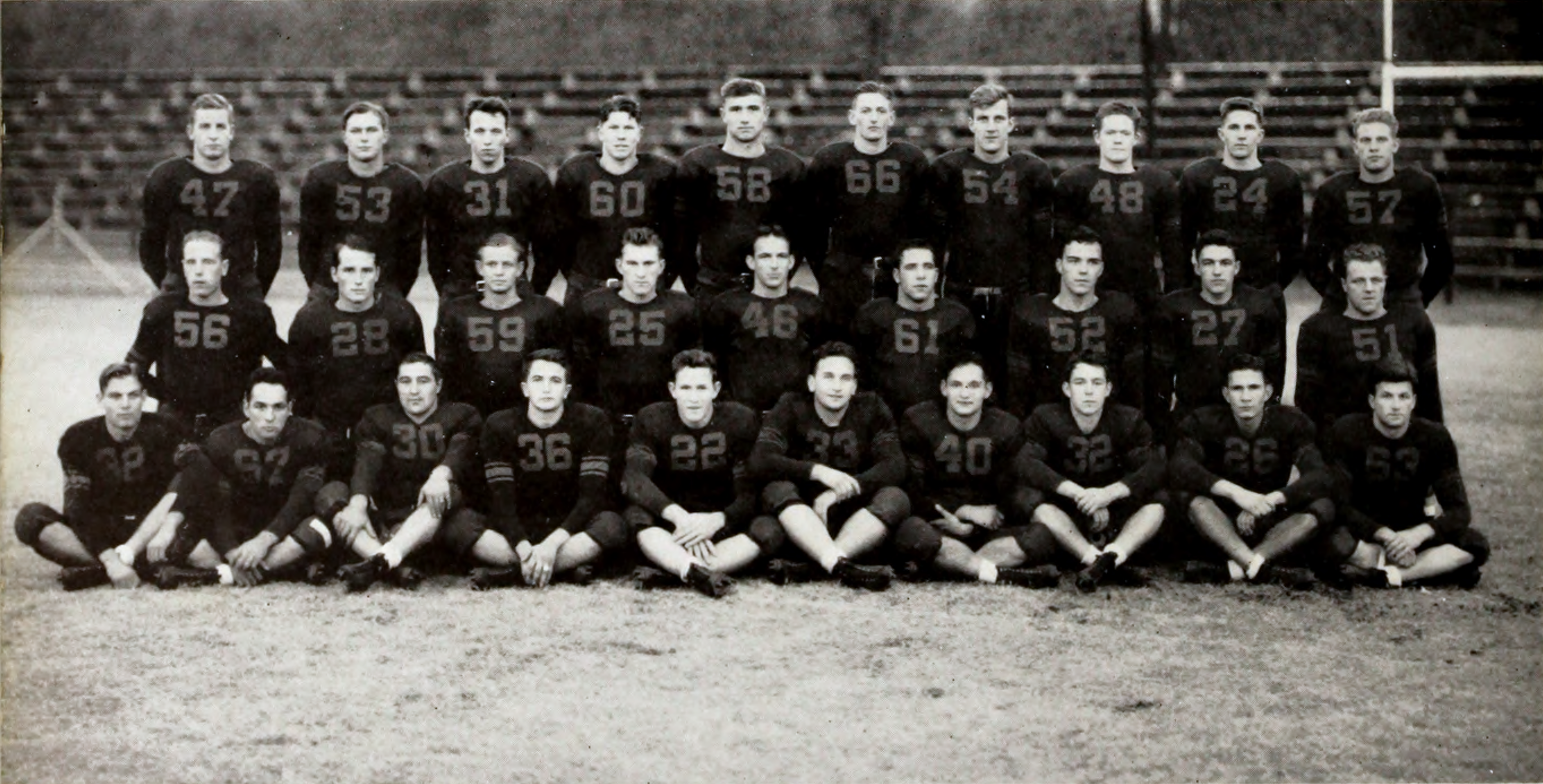

Cotton Bowl Classic champion

Cotton Bowl Classic, W 6–3 vs. Boston College
- Conference: Southern Conference

Ranking
- AP: No. 12
- Record: 9–1 (4–0 SoCon)
- Head coach: Jess Neely (9th season)
- Captain: Joe Payne
- Home stadium: Riggs Field

1939 Southern Conference football standings
	Conf.					Overall
Team	W		L		T	W		L		T
No. 8 Duke $	5	–	0	–	0	8	–	1	–	0
No. 12 Clemson	4	–	0	–	0	9	–	1	–	0
William & Mary	2	–	0	–	1	6	–	2	–	1
North Carolina	5	–	1	–	0	8	–	1	–	1
VMI	3	–	1	–	1	6	–	3	–	1
Richmond	3	–	1	–	1	7	–	1	–	2
Furman	3	–	3	–	0	5	–	4	–	0
Wake Forest	3	–	3	–	0	7	–	3	–	0
NC State	2	–	4	–	0	2	–	8	–	0
Washington and Lee	1	–	2	–	0	3	–	4	–	1
South Carolina	1	–	3	–	0	3	–	6	–	1
VPI	1	–	4	–	1	4	–	5	–	1
Davidson	1	–	7	–	0	2	–	7	–	0
Maryland	0	–	1	–	0	2	–	7	–	0
The Citadel	0	–	4	–	0	3	–	8	–	0
$ – Conference champion; Rankings from AP Poll

The 1939 Clemson Tigers football team was an American football team that represented Clemson College in the Southern Conference during the 1939 college football season. In their ninth and final season under head coach Jess Neely, the Tigers compiled a 9–1 record, outscored opponents by a total of 165 to 40, and defeated Boston College in the 1940 Cotton Bowl Classic. The 1940 Cotton Bowl was Clemson's first bowl game.

Joe Payne was the team captain. The team's statistical leaders included tailback Banks McFadden with 581 passing yards, fullback Charlie Timmons with 556 rushing yards, and wingback Shad Bryant with 32 points scored (4 touchdowns, 8 extra points). McFadden remained with Clemson for more than 40 years as a coach and administrator and was inducted into the College Football Hall of Fame in 1959.

Five Clemson players were named to the All-Southern team: tailback Banks McFadden; wingback Shad Bryant; center Bob Sharpe; end Joe Blalock; and tackle George Fritts.

== Schedule ==
Date	Opponent	Rank	Site	Result	Attendance	Source
September 23	Presbyterian*		Riggs Field; Clemson, SC	W 18–0	6,000	
September 30	at Tulane*		Tulane Stadium; New Orleans, LA	L 6–7	25,000	
October 7	vs. NC State		American Legion Memorial Stadium; Charlotte, NC (rivalry)	W 25–6	15,000	
October 19	at South Carolina		Carolina Municipal Stadium; Columbia, SC (rivalry)	W 27–0	20,000	
October 28	at Navy*		Thompson Stadium; Annapolis, MD	W 15–7	18,000	
November 3	at George Washington*		Griffith Stadium; Washington, DC	W 13–6		
November 11	Wake Forest		Riggs Field; Clemson, SC	W 20–7	12,000	
November 18	at Southwestern (TN)*	No. 16	Crump Stadium; Memphis, TN	W 21–6	4,500	
November 25	at Furman	No. 15	Sirrine Stadium; Greenville, SC	W 10–7	16,000	
January 1, 1940	vs. No. 11 Boston College*	No. 12	Cotton Bowl; Dallas, TX (Cotton Bowl)	W 6–3	15,000	
*Non-conference game; Rankings from AP Poll released prior to the game
