= 1939 Furman Purple Hurricane football team =

American college football season

1939 Furman Purple Hurricane football
- Conference: Southern Conference
- Record: 5–4 (3–3 SoCon)
- Head coach: Dizzy McLeod (8th season)
- Captains: Roten Shetley; Lloyd Coley
- Home stadium: Sirrine Stadium

1939 Southern Conference football standings
| | Conf. | | | | | Overall |
| Team | W | | L | | T | W | | L | | T |
|---|---|---|---|---|---|---|---|---|---|---|
| No. 8 Duke $ | 5 | – | 0 | – | 0 | 8 | – | 1 | – | 0 |
| No. 12 Clemson | 4 | – | 0 | – | 0 | 9 | – | 1 | – | 0 |
| William & Mary | 2 | – | 0 | – | 1 | 6 | – | 2 | – | 1 |
| North Carolina | 5 | – | 1 | – | 0 | 8 | – | 1 | – | 1 |
| VMI | 3 | – | 1 | – | 1 | 6 | – | 3 | – | 1 |
| Richmond | 3 | – | 1 | – | 1 | 7 | – | 1 | – | 2 |
| Furman | 3 | – | 3 | – | 0 | 5 | – | 4 | – | 0 |
| Wake Forest | 3 | – | 3 | – | 0 | 7 | – | 3 | – | 0 |
| NC State | 2 | – | 4 | – | 0 | 2 | – | 8 | – | 0 |
| Washington and Lee | 1 | – | 2 | – | 0 | 3 | – | 4 | – | 1 |
| South Carolina | 1 | – | 3 | – | 0 | 3 | – | 6 | – | 1 |
| VPI | 1 | – | 4 | – | 1 | 4 | – | 5 | – | 1 |
| Davidson | 1 | – | 7 | – | 0 | 2 | – | 7 | – | 0 |
| Maryland | 0 | – | 1 | – | 0 | 2 | – | 7 | – | 0 |
| The Citadel | 0 | – | 4 | – | 0 | 3 | – | 8 | – | 0 |
$ – Conference champion; Rankings from AP Poll

The 1939 Furman Purple Hurricane football team was an American football team that represented Furman University as a member of the Southern Conference (SoCon) during the 1939 college football season. In their eighth year under head coach Dizzy McLeod, the Purple Hurricane compiled an overall record of 5–4 with a conference mark of 3–3, and finished seventh in the SoCon.

Furman was ranked at No. 89 (out of 609 teams) in the final Litkenhous Ratings for 1939.

== Schedule ==
| Date | Opponent | Site | Result | Attendance | Source |
|---|---|---|---|---|---|
| September 22 | Erskine* | Sirrine Stadium; Greenville, SC | W 38–7 | 7,500 | |
| September 30 | at Army* | Michie Stadium; West Point, NY | L 7–16 | 7,000 | |
| October 6 | Georgia* | Sirrine Stadium; Greenville, SC | W 20–0 | 12,000 | |
| October 14 | at The Citadel | Johnson Hagood Stadium; Charleston, SC (rivalry) | W 7–0 | | |
| October 28 | at Davidson | Richardson Field; Davidson, NC | W 15–0 | | |
| November 4 | at VPI | Miles Stadium; Blacksburg, VA | L 7–20 | 2,500 | |
| November 11 | at South Carolina | Carolina Municipal Stadium; Columbia, SC | W 20–0 | 8,000 | |
| November 18 | NC State | Sirrine Stadium; Greenville, SC | L 7–12 | 7,500 | |
| November 25 | No. 15 Clemson | Sirrine Stadium; Greenville, SC | L 3–14 | 16,000 | |
*Non-conference game; Rankings from AP Poll released prior to the game
