= 1939 Duke Blue Devils football team =

American college football season

1939 Duke Blue Devils football
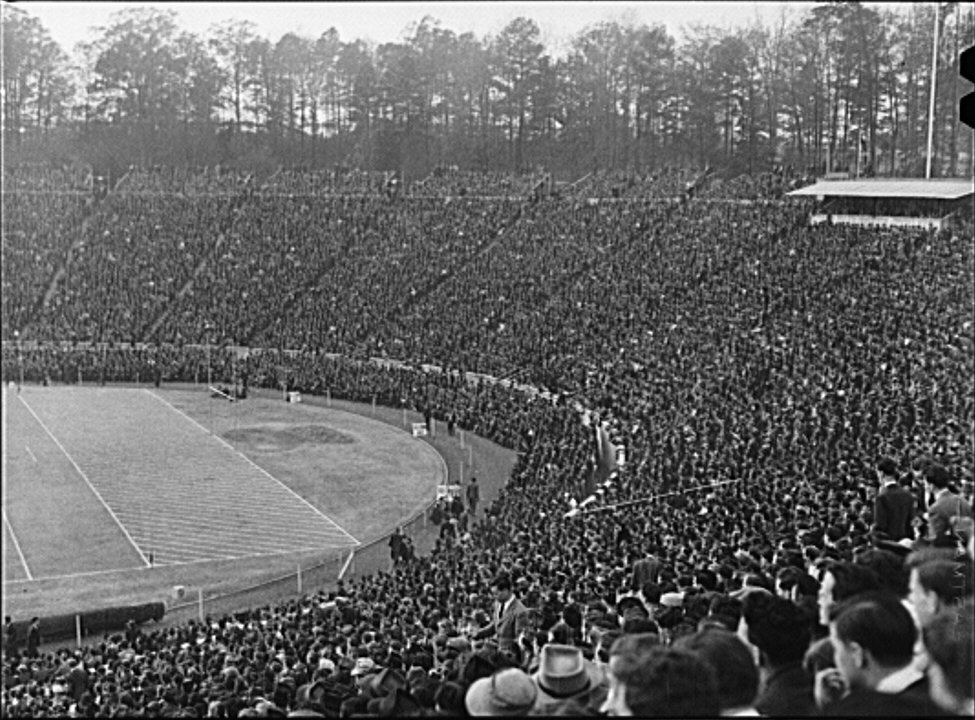
- A Wallace Wade Stadium attendance record was set on November 18, 1939, in a game against North Carolina. The 13–3 Duke win was seen by over 52,000 fans.

SoCon champion
- Conference: Southern Conference

Ranking
- AP: No. 8
- Record: 8–1 (5–0 SoCon)
- Head coach: Wallace Wade (9th season)
- Offensive scheme: Single-wing
- MVP: George McAfee
- Captain: Allen Johnson
- Home stadium: Duke Stadium

1939 Southern Conference football standings
| | Conf. | | | | | Overall |
| Team | W | | L | | T | W | | L | | T |
|---|---|---|---|---|---|---|---|---|---|---|
| No. 8 Duke $ | 5 | – | 0 | – | 0 | 8 | – | 1 | – | 0 |
| No. 12 Clemson | 4 | – | 0 | – | 0 | 9 | – | 1 | – | 0 |
| William & Mary | 2 | – | 0 | – | 1 | 6 | – | 2 | – | 1 |
| North Carolina | 5 | – | 1 | – | 0 | 8 | – | 1 | – | 1 |
| VMI | 3 | – | 1 | – | 1 | 6 | – | 3 | – | 1 |
| Richmond | 3 | – | 1 | – | 1 | 7 | – | 1 | – | 2 |
| Furman | 3 | – | 3 | – | 0 | 5 | – | 4 | – | 0 |
| Wake Forest | 3 | – | 3 | – | 0 | 7 | – | 3 | – | 0 |
| NC State | 2 | – | 4 | – | 0 | 2 | – | 8 | – | 0 |
| Washington and Lee | 1 | – | 2 | – | 0 | 3 | – | 4 | – | 1 |
| South Carolina | 1 | – | 3 | – | 0 | 3 | – | 6 | – | 1 |
| VPI | 1 | – | 4 | – | 1 | 4 | – | 5 | – | 1 |
| Davidson | 1 | – | 7 | – | 0 | 2 | – | 7 | – | 0 |
| Maryland | 0 | – | 1 | – | 0 | 2 | – | 7 | – | 0 |
| The Citadel | 0 | – | 4 | – | 0 | 3 | – | 8 | – | 0 |
$ – Conference champion; Rankings from AP Poll

The 1939 Duke Blue Devils football team represented the Duke Blue Devils of Duke University during the 1939 college football season. Dutch Stanley succeeded Carl Voyles as end coach of the "Iron Dukes". Halfback George McAfee led the team in rushing, receiving, scoring, kickoff returns, punt returns, interceptions, and punting.

== Schedule ==
| Date | Opponent | Rank | Site | Result | Attendance | Source |
|---|---|---|---|---|---|---|
| September 30 | at Davidson | | Richardson Field; Davidson, NC | W 26–6 | 7,000 | |
| October 7 | at Colgate* | | Duke Stadium; Durham, NC | W 37–0 | 20,000 | |
| October 14 | at Pittsburgh* | | Pitt Stadium; Pittsburgh, PA | L 13–14 | 49,000–50,000 | |
| October 21 | Syracuse*^{†} | No. 13 | Duke Stadium; Durham, NC | W 33–6 | 20,000–25,000 | |
| October 28 | Wake Forest | No. 12 | Duke Stadium; Durham, NC (rivalry) | W 6–0 | 16,000 | |
| November 4 | at Georgia Tech* | No. 12 | Grant Field; Atlanta, GA | W 7–6 | 30,000 | |
| November 11 | at VMI | No. 15 | Wilson Field; Lexington, VA | W 20–7 | 12,000 | |
| November 18 | No. 7 North Carolina | No. 13 | Duke Stadium; Durham, NC (rivalry) | W 13–3 | 52,000 | |
| November 25 | at NC State | No. 8 | Riddick Stadium; Raleigh, NC (rivalry) | W 28–0 | 12,000 | |
*Non-conference game; ^{†}Homecoming; Rankings from AP Poll released prior to the game
