= 1939 Catholic University Cardinals football team =

American college football season

1939 Catholic University Cardinals football

Sun Bowl, T 0–0 vs. Arizona State
- Conference: Independent
- Record: 8–1–1
- Head coach: Dutch Bergman (10th season)
- Home stadium: Brookland Stadium

1939 Southern college football independents records
	Conf.			Overall
Team	W	L	T	W		L		T
Georgetown		–		7	–	0	–	1
Catholic University		–		8	–	1	–	1
Hardin–Simmons		–		7	–	1	–	1
George Washington		–		5	–	3	–	0
Virginia		–		5	–	4	–	0
Georgia Teachers		–		5	–	5	–	0
Oklahoma City		–		4	–	4	–	2
Roanoke		–		4	–	4	–	0
Delaware State		–		2	–	2	–	0
William & Mary Norfolk		–		4	–	5	–	0
Navy		–		3	–	5	–	1
West Virginia		–		2	–	6	–	1
Western Maryland		–		1	–	6	–	0
Delaware		–		1	–	7	–	0
East Carolina		–		0	–	8	–	0

The 1939 Catholic University Cardinals football team was an American football team that represented the Catholic University of America as an independent during the 1939 college football season. Led by 10th-year head coach Dutch Bergman, the Cardinals compiled an 8–1–1 record, shut out five opponents (including four in their first five contests), and outscored all opponents by a total of 229 to 73.

The team's victories included games against the Detroit Titans, Miami Hurricanes, and Tulsa Golden Hurricane. Its only loss was to Saint Anselm in a game played at Fenway Park.

The Cardinals were invited to play in the 1940 Sun Bowl in El Paso, Texas, on New Year's Day 1940. In the first and only meeting between the two programs, Catholic University played Arizona State to a scoreless tie.

Catholic University was not ranked in the final AP poll, but it was ranked at No. 39 in the 1939 Williamson System ratings, and at No. 54 in the Litkenhous Ratings.

Key players included brothers Rocco Pirro, a fullback, and Carmen Pirro, a tackle.

== Schedule ==
Date	Opponent	Site	Result	Attendance	Source
September 29	at South Carolina	Carolina Municipal Stadium; Columbia, SC	W 12–0	7,000	
October 7	Elon	Brookland Stadium; Washington, DC	W 34–0		
October 14	Detroit	Brookland Stadium; Washington, DC	W 14–13	10,000	
October 21	West Virginia Wesleyan	Brookland Stadium; Washington, DC	W 60–0		
October 27	at Miami (FL)	Roddey Burdine Stadium; Miami, FL	W 14–0	17,046	
November 4	Tulsa	Brookland Stadium; Washington, DC	W 13–7		
November 11	vs. Saint Anselm	Fenway Park; Boston, MA	L 13–39		
November 18	Loyola (LA)	Brookland Stadium; Washington, DC	W 34–0		
November 23	at Long Island	Ebbets Field; Brooklyn, NY	W 35–14		
January 1, 1940	vs. Arizona State	Kidd Field; El Paso, TX (Sun Bowl)	T 0–0	12,000–13,000	
