= 1939 William & Mary Indians football team =

American college football season

1939 William & Mary Indians football
- Conference: Southern Conference
- Record: 6–2–1 (2–0–1 SoCon)
- Head coach: Carl M. Voyles (1st season)
- Captains: John Dillard; Loyd Phillips
- Home stadium: Cary Field

1939 Southern Conference football standings
	Conf.					Overall
Team	W		L		T	W		L		T
No. 8 Duke $	5	–	0	–	0	8	–	1	–	0
No. 12 Clemson	4	–	0	–	0	9	–	1	–	0
William & Mary	2	–	0	–	1	6	–	2	–	1
North Carolina	5	–	1	–	0	8	–	1	–	1
VMI	3	–	1	–	1	6	–	3	–	1
Richmond	3	–	1	–	1	7	–	1	–	2
Furman	3	–	3	–	0	5	–	4	–	0
Wake Forest	3	–	3	–	0	7	–	3	–	0
NC State	2	–	4	–	0	2	–	8	–	0
Washington and Lee	1	–	2	–	0	3	–	4	–	1
South Carolina	1	–	3	–	0	3	–	6	–	1
VPI	1	–	4	–	1	4	–	5	–	1
Davidson	1	–	7	–	0	2	–	7	–	0
Maryland	0	–	1	–	0	2	–	7	–	0
The Citadel	0	–	4	–	0	3	–	8	–	0
$ – Conference champion; Rankings from AP Poll

The 1939 William & Mary Indians football team represented the College of William & Mary as a member of the Southern Conference (SoCon) during the 1939 college football season. Led by first-year head coach Carl M. Voyles, the Indians compiled an overall record of 6–2–1 with a mark of 2–0–1 in conference play, and finished third in the SoCon. William & Mary played home games at Cary Field in Williamsburg, Virginia.

== Schedule ==
Date	Opponent	Site	Result	Attendance	Source
September 23	Guilford*	Cary Field; Williamsburg, VA	W 31–6		
September 30	at Navy*	Thompson Stadium; Annapolis, MD	L 6–31	20,000	
October 7	at Apprentice*	Saunders Stadium; Newport News, VA	W 39–6		
October 14	vs. VPI	City Stadium; Richmond, VA	T 6–6	6,500	
October 21	Hapmden–Sydney*	Cary Field; Williamsburg, VA	W 26–0		
October 28	vs. Virginia*	Foreman Field; Norfolk, VA	L 6–26	7,500	
November 11	Randolph–Macon*	Cary Field; Williamsburg, VA	W 19–6	2,000	
November 18	Washington and Lee^{†}	Cary Field; Williamsburg, VA	W 18–14	9,000	
November 23	at Richmond	City Stadium; Richmond, VA (rivalry)	W 7–0	12,000	
*Non-conference game; ^{†}Homecoming
