= 1939 Richmond Spiders football team =

American college football season

1939 Richmond Spiders football
- Conference: Southern Conference
- Record: 7–1–2 (3–1–1 SoCon)
- Head coach: Glenn Thistlethwaite (6th season)
- Captain: Edwin J. Merrick
- Home stadium: City Stadium

1939 Southern Conference football standings
	Conf.					Overall
Team	W		L		T	W		L		T
No. 8 Duke $	5	–	0	–	0	8	–	1	–	0
No. 12 Clemson	4	–	0	–	0	9	–	1	–	0
William & Mary	2	–	0	–	1	6	–	2	–	1
North Carolina	5	–	1	–	0	8	–	1	–	1
VMI	3	–	1	–	1	6	–	3	–	1
Richmond	3	–	1	–	1	7	–	1	–	2
Furman	3	–	3	–	0	5	–	4	–	0
Wake Forest	3	–	3	–	0	7	–	3	–	0
NC State	2	–	4	–	0	2	–	8	–	0
Washington and Lee	1	–	2	–	0	3	–	4	–	1
South Carolina	1	–	3	–	0	3	–	6	–	1
VPI	1	–	4	–	1	4	–	5	–	1
Davidson	1	–	7	–	0	2	–	7	–	0
Maryland	0	–	1	–	0	2	–	7	–	0
The Citadel	0	–	4	–	0	3	–	8	–	0
$ – Conference champion; Rankings from AP Poll

The 1939 Richmond Spiders football team was an American football team that represented the University of Richmond as a member of the Southern Conference (SoCon) during the 1939 college football season. In their sixth season under head coach Glenn Thistlethwaite, Richmond compiled a 7–1–2 record, with a mark of 3–1–1 in conference play, finishing tied for fourth place in the SoCon.

Richmond was ranked at No. 76 (out of 609 teams) in the final Litkenhous Ratings for 1939.

== Schedule ==
Date	Opponent	Site	Result	Attendance	Source
September 22	at Apprentice*	Newport News, VA	W 37–0	3,500	
September 30	Randolph–Macon*	City Stadium; Richmond, VA	W 26–0	3,000	
October 7	at Washington and Lee	Wilson Field; Lexington, VA	W 7–0	2,500	
October 14	at Rutgers*	Rutgers Stadium; Piscataway, NJ	T 6–6	8,000	
October 21	Gettysburg*	City Stadium; Richmond, VA	W 21–0		
October 28	The Citadel	City Stadium; Richmond, VA	W 19–0	5,000	
November 4	VMI	City Stadium; Richmond, VA (rivalry)	T 0–0	15,000	
November 11	VPI	City Stadium; Richmond, VA	W 13–0	8,000	
November 18	Hampden–Sydney*	City Stadium; Richmond, VA	W 26–7		
November 23	William & Mary	City Stadium; Richmond, VA (rivalry)	L 0–7	12,000	
*Non-conference game
