= Andersonville, Virginia =

Unincorporated community in Virginia, United States

Coordinates: 37°28′3″N 78°34′8″W

Andersonville is an unincorporated community in Buckingham County, in the U.S. state of Virginia.
