= 1939 NC State Wolfpack football team =

American college football season

1939 NC State Wolfpack football
- Conference: Southern Conference
- Record: 2–8 (2–4 SoCon)
- Head coach: Williams Newton (3rd season)
- Home stadium: Riddick Stadium

1939 Southern Conference football standings
| | Conf. | | | | | Overall |
| Team | W | | L | | T | W | | L | | T |
|---|---|---|---|---|---|---|---|---|---|---|
| No. 8 Duke $ | 5 | – | 0 | – | 0 | 8 | – | 1 | – | 0 |
| No. 12 Clemson | 4 | – | 0 | – | 0 | 9 | – | 1 | – | 0 |
| William & Mary | 2 | – | 0 | – | 1 | 6 | – | 2 | – | 1 |
| North Carolina | 5 | – | 1 | – | 0 | 8 | – | 1 | – | 1 |
| VMI | 3 | – | 1 | – | 1 | 6 | – | 3 | – | 1 |
| Richmond | 3 | – | 1 | – | 1 | 7 | – | 1 | – | 2 |
| Furman | 3 | – | 3 | – | 0 | 5 | – | 4 | – | 0 |
| Wake Forest | 3 | – | 3 | – | 0 | 7 | – | 3 | – | 0 |
| NC State | 2 | – | 4 | – | 0 | 2 | – | 8 | – | 0 |
| Washington and Lee | 1 | – | 2 | – | 0 | 3 | – | 4 | – | 1 |
| South Carolina | 1 | – | 3 | – | 0 | 3 | – | 6 | – | 1 |
| VPI | 1 | – | 4 | – | 1 | 4 | – | 5 | – | 1 |
| Davidson | 1 | – | 7 | – | 0 | 2 | – | 7 | – | 0 |
| Maryland | 0 | – | 1 | – | 0 | 2 | – | 7 | – | 0 |
| The Citadel | 0 | – | 4 | – | 0 | 3 | – | 8 | – | 0 |
$ – Conference champion; Rankings from AP Poll

The 1939 NC State Wolfpack football team was an American football team that represented North Carolina State University as a member of the Southern Conference (SoCon) during the 1939 college football season. In its third season under head coach Williams Newton, the team compiled a 2–8 record (2–4 against SoCon opponents) and was outscored by a total of 191 to 49.

NC State was ranked at No. 119 (out of 609 teams) in the final Litkenhous Ratings for 1939.

== Schedule ==
| Date | Time | Opponent | Site | Result | Attendance | Source |
|---|---|---|---|---|---|---|
| September 23 | | vs. Davidson | World War Memorial Stadium; Greensboro, NC | W 18–14 | 11,000 | |
| September 29 | | Tennessee* | Riddick Stadium; Raleigh, NC | L 0–13 | 12,000 | |
| October 7 | | vs. Clemson | American Legion Memorial Stadium; Charlotte, NC (rivalry) | L 6–25 | 15,000 | |
| October 14 | | Wake Forest | Riddick Stadium; Raleigh, NC (rivalry) | L 0–32 | 15,000 | |
| October 21 | | at Detroit* | University of Detroit Stadium; Detroit, MI | L 6–21 | | |
| November 4 | | at No. 9 North Carolina | Kenan Memorial Stadium; Chapel Hill, NC (rivalry) | L 0–17 | 14,000 | |
| November 11 | | No. 12 Duquesne* | Riddick Stadium; Raleigh, NC | L 0–7 | 13,000 | |
| November 18 | | at Furman | Sirrine Stadium; Greenville, NC | W 12–7 | 7,500 | |
| November 25 | | No. 8 Duke | Riddick Stadium; Raleigh, NC (rivalry) | L 0–28 | 12,000 | |
| December 1 | 8:15 p.m. | at Miami (FL)* | Burdine Stadium; Miami, FL | L 7–27 | 11,420 | |
*Non-conference game; Rankings from AP Poll released prior to the game; All times are in Eastern time
