= Paul Severin =

American football player and coach (1918–2006)

Biographical details
- Born: August 14, 1918; Pennsylvania, U.S.
- Died: April 6, 2006 (aged 87); Ashland, Virginia, U.S.

Playing career
- 1939–1940: North Carolina
- Position: End

Coaching career (HC unless noted)
- 1950–1957: Randolph–Macon

Head coaching record
- Overall: 37–26–7

Accomplishments and honors

Championships
- 3 Mason-Dixon (1950, 1952, 1955); 1 Virginia Little Seven (1955)

Awards
- 2× First-team All-American (1939, 1940); 2× First-team All-SoCon (1939, 1940); North Carolina Tar Heels Jersey No. 87 honored

Paul Vincent Severin (August 14, 1918 – April 6, 2006) was an American football player and coach. He grew up in Natrona, Pennsylvania, attended the University of North Carolina at Chapel Hill, and played college football for the North Carolina Tar Heels football team. He played at the end position for the Tar Heels and was selected as a first-team All-American in both 1939 (Associated Press) and 1940 (Associated Press, Newspaper Enterprise Association, Football Digest, and Newsweek). Severin served as the head football coach at Randolph–Macon College in Ashland, Virginia from 1950 to 1957, compiling a record of 37–26–7.

Severin died in Ashland, on April 6, 2006, at age 87.

== Head coaching record ==
Year	Team	Overall	Conference	Standing	Bowl/playoffs
Randolph–Macon Yellow Jackets (Mason–Dixon Conference / Virginia Little Six/Seven/Eight Conference) (1950–1957)
1950	Randolph–Macon	5–4	4–0 / 2–1	1st / 2nd	
1951	Randolph–Macon	5–3–1	3–1–1 / 1–1–1	2nd / T–2nd	
1952	Randolph–Macon	5–3–1	3–0–1 / 1–1–1	1st / T–2nd	
1953	Randolph–Macon	3–4–2	2–2 / 1–2	3rd / 3rd	
1954	Randolph–Macon	6–3	3–1 / 1–2	2nd / 3rd	
1955	Randolph–Macon	6–2–1	4–0 / 2–1	1st / T–1st	
1956	Randolph–Macon	4–4	2–2 / 1–2	T–3rd / 3rd	
1957	Randolph–Macon	3–3–2	1–1–2 / 1–2	T–2nd / 3rd	
Randolph–Macon:		37–26–7	22–15–4		
Total:		37–26–7			
National championship Conference title Conference division title or championship game berth
