= 1939 Ohio Athletic Conference football season =

American college football season

- Sport: Football
- Teams: 19
- Champion: Muskingum

Football seasons
- 1938 1940

1939 Ohio Athletic Conference football standings
| | Conf. | | | | | Overall |
| Team | W | | L | | T | W | | L | | T |
|---|---|---|---|---|---|---|---|---|---|---|
| Muskingum $ | 7 | – | 0 | – | 0 | 8 | – | 1 | – | 0 |
| Toledo | 1 | – | 0 | – | 0 | 7 | – | 3 | – | 0 |
| Capital | 5 | – | 1 | – | 0 | 5 | – | 2 | – | 0 |
| Case | 3 | – | 1 | – | 0 | 6 | – | 2 | – | 0 |
| Bowling Green | 3 | – | 1 | – | 1 | 6 | – | 1 | – | 1 |
| Findlay | 3 | – | 1 | – | 1 | 4 | – | 2 | – | 1 |
| Denison | 5 | – | 2 | – | 0 | 6 | – | 2 | – | 0 |
| John Carroll | 2 | – | 1 | – | 0 | 7 | – | 1 | – | 0 |
| Wittenberg | 4 | – | 2 | – | 0 | 5 | – | 3 | – | 0 |
| Ohio Northern | 5 | – | 3 | – | 0 | 5 | – | 3 | – | 0 |
| Marietta | 2 | – | 3 | – | 0 | 4 | – | 3 | – | 0 |
| Mount Union | 2 | – | 3 | – | 1 | 3 | – | 5 | – | 1 |
| Wooster | 2 | – | 4 | – | 0 | 2 | – | 6 | – | 0 |
| Baldwin–Wallace | 1 | – | 2 | – | 0 | 6 | – | 2 | – | 0 |
| Heidelberg | 2 | – | 5 | – | 0 | 1 | – | 8 | – | 0 |
| Ashland | 1 | – | 3 | – | 0 | 2 | – | 4 | – | 0 |
| Kent State | 1 | – | 3 | – | 1 | 3 | – | 4 | – | 1 |
| Oberlin | 0 | – | 3 | – | 0 | 3 | – | 4 | – | 1 |
| Kenyon | 0 | – | 3 | – | 0 | 0 | – | 6 | – | 1 |
| Otterbein | 0 | – | 7 | – | 0 | 0 | – | 8 | – | 0 |
$ – Conference champion

The 1939 Ohio Athletic Conference football season was the season of college football played by the 20 member schools of the Ohio Athletic Conference (OAC), commonly referred to as the "Ohio Conference", as part of the 1939 college football season. It was the 18th season of intercollegiate football competition in the OAC.

At a meeting of OAC coaches and athletic directors in May 1939, the OAC adopted a new ruling that it would begin recognizing a conference champion in the fall of 1939. No official record of conference champions had been made previously. In order to be eligible for the championship, the OAC ruled that a team must have played at least five games against OAC opponents. George Daniel was named conference commissioner for the 1939-40 academic year.

In June 1939, the Buckeye Conference was disbanded, leaving the OAC as "the only major conference operating among Ohio colleges."

The Muskingum Fighting Muskies won the 1939 OAC championship with an 8–1 record (7–0 against OAC opponents). Three Muskies won first-team spots on the 1939 All-OAC football teams, as selected by both the Associated Press (AP) and United Press (UP).

The Baldwin-Wallace Yellow Jackets compiled a 6–2 record and featured two of the OAC's best players. Guard Bill Childress received the highest vote count in the AP ballots for the All-OAC team, and back George Morris led the OAC with 100 points scored. Quarterback George Keel of Ohio Northern received the highest vote count in the UP ballots.

== Teams ==
=== Muskingum ===
1939 Muskingum Fighting Muskies football

OAC champion
- Conference: Ohio Athletic Conference
- Record: 8–1 (7–0 OAC)
- Head coach: Stu Holcomb (4th season)

The 1939 Muskingum Fighting Muskies football team represented Muskingum University of New Concord, Ohio. In their fourth season under head coach Stu Holcomb, the Fighting Muskies compiled an 8–1 record (7–0 against OAC opponents) and won the OAC championship.

Muskingum was ranked at No. 172 (out of 609 teams) in the final Litkenhous Ratings for 1939.

| Date | Opponent | Site | Result | Attendance | Source |
|---|---|---|---|---|---|
| September 22 | Otterbein | New Concord, OH | W 32–0 | | |
| September 30 | at Washington & Jefferson* | Washington, PA | L 7–16 | | |
| October 7 | at Mount Union | Alliance, OH | W 14–0 | | |
| October 13 | Marietta | New Concord, OH | W 20–0 | | |
| October 21 | at Denison | Granville, OH | W 20–6 | 5,000 | |
| October 28 | Wooster | New Concord, OH | W 20–7 | 3,200 | |
| November 4 | at Ohio Northern | Ada, OH | W 19–0 | | |
| November 11 | Heidelberg | New Concord, OH | W 55–0 | | |
| November 17 | at Georgetown (KY)* | Georgetown, KY | W 26–0 | | |
*Non-conference game

=== Toledo ===
1939 Toledo Rockets football
- Conference: Ohio Athletic Conference
- Record: 7–3 (1–0 OAC)
- Head coach: Clarence Spears (4th season)
- Captain: Frank Maher
- Home stadium: University Stadium

The 1939 Toledo Rockets football team represented Toledo University (renamed the University of Toledo in 1967) of Toledo, Ohio. In their fourth season under head coach Clarence Spears, the Rockets compiled a 7–3 record, shut out four of ten opponents, and outscored opponents by a total of 180 to 59. The defense held opponents to 5.9 points per game and allowed only nine touchdowns, both of which remain program records. The team allowed zero passing touchdowns, which is tied for the program record.

Frank Maher, who later played in the NFL for the Philadelphia Eagles, was the team captain. He returned a kickoff 92 yards in a game against Long Island.

| Date | Opponent | Site | Result | Attendance | Source |
|---|---|---|---|---|---|
| September 23 | Valparaiso* | University Stadium; Toledo, OH | W 39–0 | | |
| September 30 | Detroit Tech* | University Stadium; Toledo, OH | W 19–6 | | |
| October 7 | St. Mary's (TX)* | University Stadium; Toledo, OH | W 20–12 | | |
| October 14 | North Dakota*^{†} | University Stadium; Toledo, OH | W 26–7 | 5,000 | |
| October 20 | at Scranton* | Scranton, PA | L 6–7 | 5,000 | |
| October 28 | Western State Teachers (MI)* | University Stadium; Toledo, OH | W 6–0 | | |
| November 4 | at John Carroll | Cleveland, OH | W 20–0 | 4,000 | |
| November 11 | at Marshall* | Huntington, WV | L 12–14 | | |
| November 18 | Long Island* | University Stadium; Toledo, OH | L 12–13 | | |
| November 23 | at Xavier* | Cincinnati, OH | W 20–0 | 5,000 | |
*Non-conference game; ^{†}Homecoming

==== After the season ====
===== NFL draft =====
The following Rocket was selected in the 1940 NFL draft following the season.

| Round | Pick | Player | Position | NFL club |
|---|---|---|---|---|
| 10 | 83 | Frank Maher | Back | Philadelphia Eagles |

=== Capital ===
1939 Capital Crusaders football
- Conference: Ohio Athletic Conference
- Record: 5–2 (5–1 OAC)
- Head coach: Paul Davidson (2nd season)

The 1939 Capital Crusaders football team represented Capital University of Columbus, Ohio. In their second year under head coach Paul Davidson, the Crusaders compiled a 5–2 record (5–1 against OAC opponents) and finished in third place in the OAC.

| Date | Opponent | Site | Result | Attendance | Source |
|---|---|---|---|---|---|
| September 30 | Kenyon | Columbus, OH | W 43–0 | | |
| October 7 | at Valparaiso** | Valparaiso, IN | L 8–12 | | |
| October 14 | at Bowling Green | University Stadium; Bowling Green, OH | W 7–6 | | |
| October 21 | Marietta | Columbus, OH | W 26–0 | | |
| October 28 | Ohio Northern | Columbus, OH | L 0–6 | | |
| November 4 | at Heidelberg | Armstrong Field; Tiffin, OH | W 20–0 | | |
| November 11 | at Otterbein | Westerville, OH | W 25–0 | | |
*Non-conference game

=== Case ===
1939 Case Scientists football
- Conference: Ohio Athletic Conference
- Record: 6–2 (3–1 OAC)
- Head coach: Ray A. Ride (10th season)
- Home stadium: Van Horn Field

The 1939 Case Rough Riders football team represented the Case School of Applied Science in Cleveland, Ohio, now a part of Case Western Reserve University. In their tenth year under head coach Ray A. Ride, the Rough Riders compiled a 6–2 record (3–1 against OAC opponents) and finished in a three-way tie for fourth place in the OAC.

Case was ranked at No. 192 (out of 609 teams) in the final Litkenhous Ratings for 1939.

| Date | Opponent | Site | Result | Attendance | Source |
|---|---|---|---|---|---|
| September 30 | Otterbein | Van Horn Field; Cleveland, OH | W 51–0 | 500 | |
| October 7 | at Lehigh* | Taylor Stadium; Bethlehem, PA | W 20–13 | | |
| October 14 | Carnegie Tech | Cleveland, OH | L 0–21 | 7,000 | |
| October 28 | John Carroll | Cleveland, OH | L 0–19 | 6,500 | |
| November 4 | at Baldwin-Wallace | Berea, OH | W 6–0 | 7,000 | |
| November 11 | at Wooster | Wooster, OH | W 15–6 | | |
| November 24 | Western Reserve* | Municipal Stadium; Cleveland, OH | L 0–18 | 16,500 | |
*Non-conference game

=== Bowling Green ===
1939 Bowling Green Falcons football
- Conference: Ohio Athletic Conference
- Record: 6–1–1 (3–1–1 OAC)
- Head coach: Harry Ockerman (5th season)
- Captain: Edward Siminski
- Home stadium: University Stadium

The 1939 Bowling Green Falcons football team represented Bowling Green State College (later renamed Bowling Green State University). In their fifth season under head coach Harry Ockerman, the Falcons compiled a 6–1–1 record (3–1–1 against OAC opponents), finished in a three-way tie for fourth place in the OAC, and outscored opponents by a total of 159 to 46. Edward Siminski was the team captain. The team played its home games at University Stadium in Bowling Green, Ohio.

| Date | Opponent | Site | Result | Attendance | Source |
|---|---|---|---|---|---|
| September 30 | Bluffton | University Stadium; Bowling Green, OH | W 35–0 | | |
| October 7 | Wayne* | University Stadium; Bowling Green, OH | W 9–0 | | |
| October 14 | Capital | University Stadium; Bowling Green, OH | L 6–7 | | |
| October 21 | Otterbein^{†} | University Stadium; Bowling Green, OH | W 26–6 | 5,000 | |
| October 28 | at Wittenberg | Springfield, OH | W 19–13 | | |
| November 4 | at Kent State | Rockwell Field; Kent, OH (rivalry) | W 34–0 | | |
| November 11 | at Findlay | Findlay, OH | T 7–7 | | |
| November 18 | at Michigan State Normal* | Ypsilanti, MI | W 23–13 | | |
*Non-conference game; ^{†}Homecoming

=== Findlay ===
1939 Findlay Oilers football
- Conference: Ohio Athletic Conference
- Record: 4–2–1 (3–1–1 OAC)
- Head coach: Howard Kissell (4th season)
- Home stadium: Donnell Stadium

The 1939 Findlay Oilers football team represented the University of Findlay of Findlay, Ohio. In their fourth year under head coach Howard Kissell, the Oilers compiled a 4–2–1 record (3–1–1 against OAC opponents) and finished in a three-way tie for fourth place in the OAC.

Findlay was ranked at No. 378 (out of 609 teams) in the final Litkenhous Ratings for 1939.

| Date | Opponent | Site | Result | Attendance | Source |
|---|---|---|---|---|---|
| September 22 | Ohio Northern | Donnell Stadium; Findlay, OH | L 9–14 | | |
| October 6 | Bluffton* | Donnell Stadium; Findlay, OH | W 39–0 | | |
| October 14 | Ashland | Donnell Stadium; Findlay, OH | W 21–0 | | |
| October 20 | at Kent State | Rockwell Field; Kent, OH | W 10–7 | 3,000 | |
| October 28 | at Assumption* | Windsor, Ontario | L 6–14 | | |
| November 4 | at Kenyon | Gambier, OH | W 26–0 | | |
| November 11 | Bowling Green | Donnell Stadium; Findlay, OH | T 7–7 | | |
*Non-conference game

=== Denison ===
1939 Denison Big Red football
- Conference: Ohio Athletic Conference
- Record: 6–2 (5–2 OAC)
- Head coach: Tom Rogers (4th season)
- Home stadium: Deeds Stadium

The 1939 Denison Big Red football team represented Denison University of Granville, Ohio. In their fourth year under head coach Tom Rogers, the Big Red compiled a 5–2 record against OAC opponents) and finished in seventh place in the OAC.

Denison was ranked at No. 284 (out of 609 teams) in the final Litkenhous Ratings for 1939.

| Date | Opponent | Site | Result | Attendance | Source |
|---|---|---|---|---|---|
| September 29 | Transylvania* | Deeds Stadium; Granville, OH | W 26–0 | 3,500 | |
| October 6 | Ohio Northern | Deeds Stadium; Granville, OH | W 21–12 | | |
| October 14 | at Kenyon | Gambier, OH | W 27–0 | | |
| October 21 | Muskingum^{†} | Deeds Stadium; Granville, OH | L 6–20 | 5,000 | |
| October 27 | at Marietta | Marietta, OH | L 6–7 | | |
| November 4 | at Wittenberg | Wittenberg Stadium; Springfield, OH | W 3–0 | | |
| November 11 | at Oberlin | Oberlin, OH | W 13–7 | | |
| November 18 | Wooster | Deeds Stadium; Granville, OH | W 40–6 | | |
*Non-conference game; ^{†}Homecoming

=== Wittenberg ===
1939 Wittenberg Tigers football
- Conference: Ohio Athletic Conference
- Record: 5–3 (4–2 OAC)
- Head coach: Bill Stobbs (11th season)
- Home stadium: Wittenberg Stadium

The 1939 Wittenberg Tigers football team represented the Wittenberg University of Springfield, Ohio. In their eleventh year under head coach Bill Stobbs, the Tigers compiled a 5–3 record (4–2 against OAC opponents) and finished in eighth place in the OAC.

Wittenberg was ranked at No. 242 (out of 609 teams) in the final Litkenhous Ratings for 1939.

| Date | Opponent | Site | Result | Attendance | Source |
|---|---|---|---|---|---|
| September 30 | at Carnegie Tech* | Pittsburgh, PA | L 0–35 | 6,000 | |
| October 7 | Otterbein | Wittenberg Stadium; Springfield, OH | W 51–0 | | |
| October 14 | Bluffton* | Wittenberg Stadium; Springfield, OH | W 32–0 | | |
| October 28 | Bowling Green | Springfield, OH | L 13–19 | | |
| November 4 | Denison^{†} | Wittenberg Stadium; Springfield, OH | L 0–3 | | |
| November 11 | at Marietta | Marietta, OH | W 13–0 | 3,500 | |
| November 18 | Mount Union | Wittenberg Stadium; Springfield, OH | W 46–7 | | |
| November 25 | at Oberlin | Oberlin, OH | W 14–0 | | |
*Non-conference game; ^{†}Homecoming

=== John Carroll ===
1939 John Carroll Blue Streaks football
- Conference: Ohio Athletic Conference
- Record: 7–1 (2–1 OAC)
- Head coach: Tom Conley (4th season)

The 1939 John Carroll Blue Streaks football team represented John Carroll University of University Heights, Ohio. In their fourth season under head coach Tom Conley, the Blue Streaks compiled a 7–1 record (2–1 against OAC opponents). John Carroll won its first Big Four conference title, going a perfect 3–0.

Five John Carroll players received honors from the United Press on its 1939 All-Ohio Conference football team. End Jack Dewan won first-team honors, and four others received second-team recognition: tackle Sulzer; guard Rancourt; halfback Carl Estenik; and fullback Young.

John Carroll was ranked at No. 137 (out of 609 teams) in the final Litkenhous Ratings for 1939.

| Date | Opponent | Site | Result | Attendance | Source |
|---|---|---|---|---|---|
| October 1 | at Saint Francis (PA)* | Johnstown, PA | W 13–2 | | |
| October 7 | Baldwin–Wallace | Municipal Stadium; Cleveland, OH | W 7–6 | | |
| October 22 | at Saint Joseph's* | Philadelphia, PA | W 6–0 | 5,000 | |
| October 28 | Case | Shaw Stadium; Cleveland, OH | W 19–0 | 6,500 | |
| November 4 | Toledo | Municipal Stadium; Cleveland, OH | L 0–20 | 4,000 | |
| November 11 | Arkansas A&M* | Municipal Stadium; Cleveland, OH | W 49–7 | 3,000 | |
| November 18 | Western Reserve* | Municipal Stadium; Cleveland, OH | W 6–0 | 17,000 | |
| November 23 | at Akron* | Buchtel Field; Akron, OH | W 25–6 | 7,500 | |
*Non-conference game

=== Ohio Northern ===
1939 Ohio Northern Polar Bears football
- Conference: Ohio Athletic Conference
- Record: 5–3 (5–3 OAC)
- Head coach: Harris Lamb (9th season)

The 1939 Ohio Northern Polar Bears football team represented Ohio Northern University of Ada, Ohio. In their ninth season under head coach Harris Lamb, the Polar Bears compiled a 5–3 record (5–3 against OAC opponents) and finished in tenth place in the OAC.

Ohio Northern was ranked at No. 361 (out of 609 teams) in the final Litkenhous Ratings for 1939.

| Date | Opponent | Site | Result | Attendance | Source |
|---|---|---|---|---|---|
| September 22 | at Findlay | Donnell Stadium; Findlay, OH | W 14–9 | | |
| September 30 | at Wooster | Wooster, OH | W 6–0 | | |
| October 6 | at Denison | Deeds Stadium; Granville, OH | L 12–21 | | |
| October 14 | at Heidelberg | Armstrong Field; Tiffin, OH | W 7–0 | 1,500 | |
| October 21 | Ashland | Ada, OH | W 34–0 | | |
| October 28 | at Capital | Columbus, OH | W 6–0 | | |
| November 4 | Muskingum | Ada, OH | L 0–19 | | |
| November 11 | at Mount Union | Alliance, OH | L 0–7 | | |

=== Marietta ===
1939 Marietta Pioneers football
- Conference: Ohio Athletic Conference
- Record: 4–3 (2–3 OAC)
- Head coach: Frank L. Hayes (13th season)

The 1939 Marietta Pioneers football team represented the Marietta College of Marietta, Ohio. In their 13th year under head coach Frank L. Hayes, the Pioneers compiled a 4–3 record (2–3 against OAC opponents) and finished in a tie for 11th place in the OAC.

| Date | Opponent | Site | Result | Attendance | Source |
|---|---|---|---|---|---|
| September 29 | Rio Grande* | Marietta, OH | W 25–0 | | |
| October 6 | Fairmont (WV)* | Marietta, OH | W 13–12 | | |
| October 13 | at Muskingum | New Concord, OH | L 0–20 | | |
| October 21 | at Capital | Columbus, OH | L 0–26 | | |
| October 27 | Denison | Marietta, OH | W 7–6 | | |
| November 4 | at Otterbein | Westerville, OH | W 16–0 | | |
| November 11 | Wittenberg | Marietta, OH | L 0–13 | 3,500 | |
*Non-conference game

=== Mount Union ===
1939 Mount Union Purple Raiders football
- Conference: Ohio Athletic Conference
- Record: 3–5–1 (2–3–1 OAC)
- Head coach: Harry Geltz (8th season)

The 1939 Mount Union Purple Raiders football team represented the University of Mount Union of Alliance, Ohio. In their eighth season under head coach Harry Geltz, the Purple Raiders compiled a 3–5–1 record (2–3–1 against OAC opponents) and finished in a tie for 11th place in the OAC.

Mount Union was ranked at No. 348 (out of 609 teams) in the final Litkenhous Ratings for 1939.

| Date | Opponent | Site | Result | Attendance | Source |
|---|---|---|---|---|---|
| September 22 | Albion* | Alliance, OH | W 13–0 | | |
| September 30 | at Miami (OH)* | Miami Field; Oxford, OH | L 0–7 | | |
| October 7 | Muskingum | Alliance, OH | L 0–14 | | |
| October 14 | Kent State | Alliance, OH | T 6–6 | 3,000 | |
| October 21 | at Wooster | Wooster, OH | L 0–20 | | |
| October 28 | at Heidelberg | Armstrong Field; Tiffin, OH | W 34–0 | | |
| November 4 | at Hiram* | Hiram, OH | L 13–25 | | |
| November 11 | Ohio Northern | Alliance, OH | W 7–0 | | |
| November 18 | at Wittenberg | Wittenberg Stadium; Springfield, OH | L 7–46 | | |
*Non-conference game

=== Wooster ===
1939 Wooster Fighting Scots football
- Conference: Ohio Athletic Conference
- Record: 2–6 (2–4 OAC)
- Head coach: Lawrence C. Boles (13th season)

The 1939 Wooster Fighting Scots football team represented the College of Wooster of Wooster, Ohio. In their 13th and final year under head coach Lawrence C. Boles, the Fighting Scots compiled a 2–6 record (2–4 against OAC opponents) and finished in a tie for 13th place in the OAC.

Wooster was ranked at No. 354 (out of 609 teams) in the final Litkenhous Ratings for 1939.

| Date | Opponent | Site | Result | Attendance | Source |
|---|---|---|---|---|---|
| September 30 | Ohio Northern | Wooster, OH | L 0–6 | | |
| October 7 | at Rutgers* | Rutgers Stadium; Piscataway, NJ | L 0–20 | | |
| October 14 | at Washington & Jefferson* | Washington, PA | L 0–7 | 3,500 | |
| October 21 | Mount Union | Wooster, OH | W 20–0 | | |
| October 28 | at Muskingum | New Concord, OH | L 7–20 | | |
| November 4 | Oberlin | Wooster, OH | W 19–15 | | |
| November 11 | Case | Wooster, OH | L 6–15 | | |
| November 18 | at Denison | Deeds Stadium; Granville, OH | L 6–40 | | |
*Non-conference game

=== Baldwin–Wallace ===
1939 Baldwin–Wallace Yellow Jackets football
- Conference: Ohio Athletic Conference
- Record: 6–2 (1–2 OAC)
- Head coach: Ray E. Watts (12th season)

The 1939 Baldwin–Wallace Yellow Jackets football team represented Baldwin Wallace University of Berea, Ohio. In their 12th season under head coach Ray E. Watts, the Yellow Jackets compiled 6–2 record (1–2 against OAC opponents), finished in a tie for 13th place in the OAC and finished in 12th place in the OAC.

Baldwin-Wallace back George Morris led Ohio with 100 points scored.

Baldwin-Wallace was ranked at No. 101 (out of 609 teams) in the final Litkenhous Ratings for 1939.

| Date | Opponent | Site | Result | Attendance | Source |
|---|---|---|---|---|---|
| September 30 | Hiram* | Berea, OH | W 19–0 | | |
| October 7 | at John Carroll | Municipal Stadium; Cleveland, OH | L 6–7 | | |
| October 14 | Grand Rapids* | Berea, OH | W 63–0 | | |
| October 20 | at Western Reserve* | Shaw Stadium; East Cleveland, OH | W 8–7 | 12,000 | |
| November 4 | Case | Berea, OH | L 0–6 | 7,000 | |
| November 11 | at Akron* | Buchtel Field; Akron, OH | W 39–7 | 6,200 | |
| November 18 | Kent State | Berea, OH | W 40–6 | 2,000 | |
| November 23 | Ohio Wesleyan* | | W 22–7 | | |
*Non-conference game

=== Heidelberg ===
1939 Heidelberg Student Princes football
- Conference: Ohio Athletic Conference
- Record: 2–7 (2–5 OAC)
- Head coach: Ted Turney (10th season)
- Home stadium: Armstrong Field

The 1939 Heidelberg Student Princes football team represented the Heidelberg University of Tiffin, Ohio. In their tenth season under head coach Ted Turney, the Student Princes compiled a 2–7 record (2–5 against OAC opponents) and finished in 15th place in the OAC.

Heidelberg as ranked at No. 568 in the final Litkenhous Ratings for 1939.

| Date | Opponent | Site | Result | Attendance | Source |
|---|---|---|---|---|---|
| September 30 | Ashland | Armstrong Field; Tiffin, OH | W 14–6 | | |
| October 7 | at Kent State | Rockwell Field; Kent, OH | L 0–19 | 3,000 | |
| October 14 | Ohio Northern^{†} | Armstrong Field; Tiffin, OH | L 0–7 | 1,500 | |
| October 21 | at Kenyon | Mount Vernon, OH | W 9–0 | | |
| October 28 | Mount Union | Armstrong Field; Tiffin, OH | L 0–34 | | |
| November 4 | Capital | Armstrong Field; Tiffin, OH | W 6–0 | | |
| November 11 | at Muskingum | New Concord, OH | L 0–55 | | |
| November 18 | at Detroit Tech* | Robinson Field; Detroit, MI | L 0–52 | | |
| November 25 | at Bethany* | Bethany, WV | L 0–13 | | |
*Non-conference game; ^{†}Homecoming

=== Ashland ===
1939 Ashland Eagles football
- Conference: Ohio Athletic Conference
- Record: 2–4 (1–3 OAC)
- Head coach: Tony Loreno (2nd season)

The 1939 Ashland Eagles football team represented Ashland University of Ashland, Ohio. In their second year under head coach Tony Loreno, the Tigers compiled a 2–4 record (1–3 against OAC opponents) and finished in a tie for 16th place in the OAC.

Ashland was ranked at No. 579 in the final Litkenhous Ratings for 1939.

| Date | Opponent | Site | Result | Attendance | Source |
|---|---|---|---|---|---|
| September 30 | at Heidelberg | Armstrong Field; Tiffin, OH | L 6–14 | | |
| October 7 | Defiance* | | W 33–7 | | |
| October 14 | at Findlay | Donnell Stadium; Findlay, OH | L 0–21 | | |
| October 21 | at Ohio Northern | Ada, OH | L 0–34 | | |
| October 28 | Otterbein | Ashland, OH | W 18–0 | | |
*Non-conference game

=== Kent State ===
1939 Kent State Golden Flashes football
- Conference: Ohio Athletic Conference
- Record: 3–4–1 (1–3–1 OAC)
- Head coach: Donald Starn (5th season)
- Home stadium: Rockwell Field

The 1939 Kent State Golden Flashes football team represented Kent State University of Kent, Ohio. In their fifth season under head coach Donald Starn, the Golden Flashes compiled a 3–4–1 record (1–3–1 against OAC opponents). The team compiled a 3–1–1 record through the end of October, but then lost all three November games, including back-to-back shutouts against rival Bowling Green (0–34) and Western Reserve (0–38).

Kent State was ranked at No. 424 in the final Litkenhous Ratings for 1939.

| Date | Opponent | Site | Result | Attendance | Source |
|---|---|---|---|---|---|
| September 30 | Lawrence Tech* | Rockwell Field; Kent, OH | W 20–6 | | |
| October 7 | Heidelberg | Rockwell Field; Kent, OH | W 19–0 | 3,000 | |
| October 14 | at Mount Union^{†} | Alliance, OH | T 6–6 | 3,000 | |
| October 20 | Findlay | Rockwell Field; Kent, OH | L 7–10 | 3,000 | |
| October 28 | at Hobart* | Boswell Field; Geneva, NY | W 8–6 | | |
| November 4 | Bowling Green | Rockwell Field; Kent, OH (rivalry) | L 0–34 | 5,000 | |
| November 11 | at Western Reserve* | League Park; Cleveland, OH | L 0–38 | 8,000 | |
| November 18 | at Baldwin–Wallace | Berea, OH | L 6–40 | 2,000 | |
*Non-conference game; ^{†}Homecoming

=== Kenyon ===
1939 Kenyon Lords football
- Conference: Ohio Athletic Conference
- Record: 0–6–1 (0–4 OAC)
- Head coach: Dwight Hafeli (3rd season)

The 1939 Kenyon Lords football team represented Kenyon College of Gambier, Ohio. In their third year under head coach Dwight Hafeli, the Lords compiled a 0–6–1 record (0–4 against OAC opponents) and finished in a three-way tie for last place in the OAC.

Kenyon was ranked at No. 585 in the final Litkenhous Ratings for 1939.

| Date | Opponent | Site | Result | Attendance | Source |
|---|---|---|---|---|---|
| September 23 | vs. Bluffton* | Lima Stadium; Lima, OH | L 0–3 | 1,700 | |
| September 30 | at Capital | Columbus, OH | L 0–43 | | |
| October 7 | at Hobart* | Geneva, NY | L 0–27 | | |
| October 14 | Denison | Gambier, OH | L 0–27 | | |
| October 21 | Heidelberg | Mount Vernon, OH | L 0–9 | | |
| October 28 | Alfred Holbrook* | Mount Vernon, OH | T 0–0 | | |
| November 4 | Findlay | Gambier, OH | L 0–26 | | |
*Non-conference game

=== Oberlin ===
1939 Oberlin Yeomen football
- Conference: Ohio Athletic Conference
- Record: 3–4–1 (0–3 OAC)
- Head coach: Lysle K. Butler (10th season)
- Captain: Robert T. Kretchmar

The 1939 Oberlin Yeomen football team represented Oberlin College of Oberlin, Ohio. In their 10th season under head coach Lysle K. Butler, the Cardinals compiled a 3–4–1 record (0–3 against OAC opponents) and finished in a three-way tie for last place in the OAC.

Senior quarterback Robert T. Kretchmar was the captain.

Oberlin was ranked at No. 432 in the final Litkenhous Ratings for 1939.

| Date | Opponent | Site | Result | Attendance | Source |
|---|---|---|---|---|---|
| October 7 | Rochester* | Oberlin, OH | W 12–0 | 5,000 | |
| October 14 | at Allegheny* | Meadville, PA | W 27–0 | 2,000 | |
| October 21 | at Hamilton* | Clinton, NY | W 6–0 | | |
| October 28 | Swarthmore* | Oberlin, OH | T 12–12 | 3,000 | |
| November 4 | at Wooster | Wooster, OH | L 14–19 | | |
| November 11 | Denison | Oberlin, OH | L 7–13 | | |
| November 18 | at Chicago* | Stagg Field; Chicago, IL | L 0–25 | 3,000 | |
| November 25 | Wittenberg | Oberlin, OH | L 0–14 | | |
*Non-conference game

=== Otterbein ===
1939 Otterbein Cardinals football
- Conference: Ohio Athletic Conference
- Record: 0–8 (0–7 OAC)
- Head coach: Sam T. Selby (1st season)

The 1939 Otterbein Cardinals football team represented Otterbein University of Westerville, Ohio. In their first season under head coach Sam T. Selby, the Cardinals compiled a 0–8 record (0–7 against OAC opponent) and finished in a three-way tie for last place in the OAC.

Otterbein was ranked at No. 590 in the final Litkenhous Ratings for 1939.

| Date | Opponent | Site | Result | Attendance | Source |
|---|---|---|---|---|---|
| September 22 | at Muskingum | New Concord, OH | L 0–32 | | |
| September 30 | at Case | Van Horn Field; Cleveland, OH | L 0–51 | 500 | |
| October 7 | at Wittenberg | Wittenberg Stadium; Springfield, OH | L 0–51 | | |
| October 14 | at Waynesburg* | Waynesburg, PA | L 0–32 | | |
| October 21 | at Bowling Green | University Stadium; Bowling Green, OH | L 6–26 | 5,000 | |
| October 28 | at Ashland | Ashland, OH | L 0–18 | | |
| November 4 | Marietta | Westerville, OH | L 0–16 | | |
| November 11 | Capital | Westerville, OH | L 0–25 | | |
*Non-conference game
