= 1939 Michigan State Spartans football team =

American college football season

1939 Michigan State Spartans football
- Conference: Independent
- Record: 4–4–1
- Head coach: Charlie Bachman (7th season)
- Offensive scheme: Notre Dame Box
- MVP: Lyle Rockenbach
- Captains: Michael Kinek; Lyle Rockenbach
- Home stadium: Macklin Field

1939 Midwestern college football independents records
	Conf.			Overall
Team	W	L	T	W		L		T
Central Michigan		–		8	–	1	–	0
No. 13 Notre Dame		–		7	–	2	–	0
Michigan Tech		–		3	–	1	–	1
Ohio		–		6	–	3	–	0
Detroit		–		5	–	3	–	1
Akron		–		5	–	4	–	0
Cincinnati		–		4	–	3	–	2
Ohio Wesleyan		–		5	–	4	–	1
Marquette		–		4	–	4	–	0
Michigan State		–		4	–	4	–	1
Dayton		–		4	–	4	–	1
Michigan State Normal		–		3	–	3	–	1
Wayne		–		4	–	5	–	0
Xavier		–		3	–	5	–	1
Western State Teachers		–		2	–	6	–	1
Miami (OH)		–		1	–	7	–	1
Rankings from AP Poll

The 1939 Michigan State Spartans football team represented Michigan State College as an independent during the 1939 college football season. In their seventh season under head coach Charlie Bachman, the Spartans compiled a 4–4–1 record and lost their annual rivalry game with Michigan by a 26 to 13 score. In inter-sectional play, the team defeated Syracuse (14–2) and Temple (18–7) and lost to Santa Clara (6–0).

Michigan State was ranked at No. 74 (out of 609 teams) in the final Litkenhous Ratings for 1939.

== Schedule ==
Date	Opponent	Site	Result	Attendance	Source
September 30	Wayne	Macklin Field; East Lansing, MI	W 16–0		
October 7	at Michigan	Michigan Stadium; Ann Arbor, MI (rivalry)	L 13–26	68,618	
October 14	Marquette	Macklin Field; East Lansing, MI	L 14–17	12,000	
October 21	at Purdue	Ross–Ade Stadium; West Lafayette, IN	L 7–20	21,000	
October 28	Illinois Wesleyan	Macklin Field; East Lansing, MI	W 13–6		
November 4	at Syracuse	Archbold Stadium; Syracuse, NY	W 14–3	16,000	
November 11	at Santa Clara	Kezar Stadium; San Francisco, CA	L 0–6	18,000	
November 18	Indiana^{†}	Macklin Field; East Lansing, MI (rivalry)	T 7–7		
November 25	Temple	Macklin Field; East Lansing, MI	W 18–7	8,500	
^{†}Homecoming

== Game summaries ==
=== Michigan ===
Week 1: Michigan State at Michigan

Team	1	2	3	4	Total
Michigan State	0	0	7	6	13
• Michigan	7	19	0	0	26

- Date: October 7, 1939
- Location: Michigan Stadium
  Ann Arbor, MI
- Game attendance: 68,618
- Referee: Lyle Clarno (Bradley)

On October 7, 1939, the Aggies opened their season with a 26 to 13 victory over Michigan. The game, the 34th played between the two programs, was played at Michigan Stadium before 68,618 spectators that The New York Times called "a howling throng."

Michigan took a 26 to 0 lead at halftime. The Wolverines' first points came on three-yard run around the right end by Paul Kromer, with blocking by Tom Harmon and Forest Evashevski, capping a 65-yard touchdown drive. On the opening play of the second quarter, Harmon scored on a two-yard run, capping a drive that started at Michigan State's 33-yard line. On the ensuing Michigan State drive, Archie Kodros intercepted a pass at the Spartans' 20-yard line, and after a 15-yard penalty was assessed, Michigan took over on the five-yard line. From there, Harmon threw a touchdown pass to Evashevski. Michigan's final score followed a second interception by Kodros, with Kodros catching the ball at the 45-yard line and returning it 17 yards to the 28-yard line. On fourth down from the four-yard line, Harmon threw his second touchdown pass to Evashevski. In the third quarter, Bill Batchelor of Michigan State intercepted a pass and returned it 25 yards for a touchdown. In the fourth quarter, the Spartans scored again on a 71-yard pass play from Bill Kennedy to Wyman Davis. Harmon and William Melzow each kicked one point after touchdown (PAT) in the game.
