= Rockenbach =

Rockenbach is a surname. Notable people with this surname include:

- Anneliese Rockenbach (born 1943), Venezuelan swimmer
- Lyle Rockenbach (1915–2005), American football player
- Samuel D. Rockenbach (1869–1952), United States Army officer and father of the Tank Corps
- Thiago Rockenbach (born 1985), Brazilian football player
