= 1939 Toledo Rockets football team =

American college football season

1939 Toledo Rockets football
- Conference: Ohio Athletic Conference
- Record: 7–3 (1–0 OAC)
- Head coach: Clarence Spears (4th season)
- Captain: Frank Maher
- Home stadium: University Stadium

1939 Ohio Athletic Conference football standings
	Conf.					Overall
Team	W		L		T	W		L		T
Muskingum $	7	–	0	–	0	8	–	1	–	0
Toledo	1	–	0	–	0	7	–	3	–	0
Capital	5	–	1	–	0	5	–	2	–	0
Case	3	–	1	–	0	6	–	2	–	0
Bowling Green	3	–	1	–	1	6	–	1	–	1
Findlay	3	–	1	–	1	4	–	2	–	1
Denison	5	–	2	–	0	6	–	2	–	0
John Carroll	2	–	1	–	0	7	–	1	–	0
Wittenberg	4	–	2	–	0	5	–	3	–	0
Ohio Northern	5	–	3	–	0	5	–	3	–	0
Marietta	2	–	3	–	0	4	–	3	–	0
Mount Union	2	–	3	–	1	3	–	5	–	1
Wooster	2	–	4	–	0	2	–	6	–	0
Baldwin–Wallace	1	–	2	–	0	6	–	2	–	0
Heidelberg	2	–	5	–	0	1	–	8	–	0
Ashland	1	–	3	–	0	2	–	4	–	0
Kent State	1	–	3	–	1	3	–	4	–	1
Oberlin	0	–	3	–	0	3	–	4	–	1
Kenyon	0	–	3	–	0	0	–	6	–	1
Otterbein	0	–	7	–	0	0	–	8	–	0
$ – Conference champion

The 1939 Toledo Rockets football team was an American football team that represented Toledo University (renamed the University of Toledo in 1967) in the Ohio Athletic Conference (OAC) during the 1939 college football season. In their fourth season under head coach Clarence Spears, the team compiled a 7–3 record, shut out four of ten opponents, and outscored opponents by a combined total of 180 to 59. The defense held opponents to 5.9 points per game and allowed only nine touchdowns, both of which remain program records. The team allowed zero passing touchdowns, which is tied for the program record.

Frank Maher, who later played in the NFL for the Philadelphia Eagles, was the team captain. He returned a kickoff 92 yards in a game against Long Island.

== Schedule ==
Date	Opponent	Site	Result	Attendance	Source
September 23	Valparaiso*	University Stadium; Toledo, OH	W 39–0		
September 30	Detroit Tech*	University Stadium; Toledo, OH	W 19–6		
October 7	St. Mary's (TX)*	University Stadium; Toledo, OH	W 20–12		
October 14	North Dakota*^{†}	University Stadium; Toledo, OH	W 26–7	5,000	
October 20	at Scranton*	Scranton, PA	L 6–7	5,000	
October 28	Western State Teachers (MI)*	University Stadium; Toledo, OH	W 6–0		
November 4	at John Carroll	Cleveland, OH	W 20–0	4,000	
November 11	at Marshall*	Huntington, WV	L 12–14		
November 18	Long Island*	University Stadium; Toledo, OH	L 12–13		
November 23	at Xavier	Cincinnati, OH	W 20–0	5,000	
*Non-conference game; ^{†}Homecoming
