= 1939 Akron Zippers football team =

American college football season

1939 Akron Zippers football
- Conference: Independent
- Record: 5–4
- Head coach: Thomas Dowler (1st season)
- Captain: Dominic Patella
- Home stadium: Buchtel Field

1939 Midwestern college football independents records
	Conf.			Overall
Team	W	L	T	W		L		T
Central Michigan		–		8	–	1	–	0
No. 13 Notre Dame		–		7	–	2	–	0
Michigan Tech		–		3	–	1	–	1
Ohio		–		6	–	3	–	0
Detroit		–		5	–	3	–	1
Akron		–		5	–	4	–	0
Cincinnati		–		4	–	3	–	2
Ohio Wesleyan		–		5	–	4	–	1
Marquette		–		4	–	4	–	0
Michigan State		–		4	–	4	–	1
Dayton		–		4	–	4	–	1
Michigan State Normal		–		3	–	3	–	1
Wayne		–		4	–	5	–	0
Xavier		–		3	–	5	–	1
Western State Teachers		–		2	–	6	–	1
Miami (OH)		–		1	–	7	–	1
Rankings from AP Poll

The 1939 Akron Zippers football team was an American football team that represented the University of Akron as an independent during the 1939 college football season. In its first season under head coach Thomas Dowler, the team compiled a 5–4 record and was outscored by a total of 132 to 122. Dominic Patella was the team captain.

Akron was ranked at No. 228 (out of 609 teams) in the final Litkenhous Ratings for 1939.

== Schedule ==
Date	Opponent	Site	Result	Attendance	Source
September 30	Wheaton (IL)	Buchtel Field; Akron, OH	W 33–6	3,000	
October 7	Illinois Wesleyan	Buchtel Field; Akron, OH	W 13–8	5,500	
October 14	at Western State Teachers (MI)	Waldo Stadium; Kalamazoo, MI	L 0–6		
October 21	at Miami (OH)	Miami Field; Oxford, OH	W 14–0	7,000	
October 28	Wayne^{†}	Buchtel Field; Akron, OH	L 12–18	5,402	
November 4	Washington & Jefferson	Buchtel Field; Akron, OH	W 24–22	6,000	
November 11	Baldwin–Wallace	Buchtel Field; Akron, OH	L 7–39	6,200	
November 18	West Liberty State	Buchtel Field; Akron, OH	W 13–7		
November 23	John Carroll	Buchtel Field; Akron, OH	L 6–25	7,500	
^{†}Homecoming
