= Tom Rogers (American football, born 1902) =

American football player and coach (1902–1976)

Biographical details
- Born: May 5, 1902; Washington Court House, Ohio, U.S.
- Died: May 25, 1976 (aged 74); Newark, Ohio, U.S.

Playing career

Football
- 1922–1924: Denison

Basketball
- 1922–1924: Denison
- Position: Halfback (football)

Coaching career (HC unless noted)

Football
- 1926–1934: Denison (backfield)
- 1935–1941: Denison

Basketball
- 1926–1935: Denison (freshmen)

Head coaching record
- Overall: 36–18–4

Thomas Arthur Rogers (May 5, 1902 – May 25, 1976) was an American college football player and coach. He served as the head coach at Denison University from 1935 to 1941, compiling a record of 36–18.

Rogers was born on May 5, 1902, in Washington Court House, Ohio. He died from congestive heart failure, on May 25, 1976, at Licking Memorial Hospital in Newark, Ohio.

== Head coaching record ==
Year	Team	Overall	Conference	Standing	Bowl/playoffs
Denison Big Red (Ohio Athletic Conference) (1935–1941)
1935	Denison	4–5	3–3	T–9th	
1936	Denison	2–4–1	2–3–1	14th	
1937	Denison	6–1–1	5–1–1	2nd	
1938	Denison	7–2	5–2	5th	
1939	Denison	6–2	5–2	7th	
1940	Denison	4–3–1	3–2–1	T–6th	
1941	Denison	7–1–1	5–1–1	T–5th	
Denison:		36–18–4	28–14–4		
Total:		36–18–4			
