= 1939 Dayton Flyers football team =

American college football season

1939 Dayton Flyers football
- Conference: Independent
- Record: 4–4–1
- Head coach: Harry Baujan (17th season)
- Home stadium: University of Dayton Stadium

1939 Midwestern college football independents records
	Conf.			Overall
Team	W	L	T	W		L		T
Central Michigan		–		8	–	1	–	0
No. 13 Notre Dame		–		7	–	2	–	0
Michigan Tech		–		3	–	1	–	1
Ohio		–		6	–	3	–	0
Detroit		–		5	–	3	–	1
Akron		–		5	–	4	–	0
Cincinnati		–		4	–	3	–	2
Ohio Wesleyan		–		5	–	4	–	1
Marquette		–		4	–	4	–	0
Michigan State		–		4	–	4	–	1
Dayton		–		4	–	4	–	1
Michigan State Normal		–		3	–	3	–	1
Wayne		–		4	–	5	–	0
Xavier		–		3	–	5	–	1
Western State Teachers		–		2	–	6	–	1
Miami (OH)		–		1	–	7	–	1
Rankings from AP Poll

The 1939 Dayton Flyers football team was an American football team that represented the University of Dayton as an independent during the 1939 college football season. In their 17th season under head coach Harry Baujan, the Flyers compiled a 4–4–1 record.

Dayton was ranked at No. 118 (out of 609 teams) in the final Litkenhous Ratings for 1939.

== Schedule ==
Date	Opponent	Site	Result	Attendance	Source
September 30	at Western Reserve	League Park; Cleveland, OH	L 0–7	7,000	
October 6	Cincinnati	University of Dayton Stadium; Dayton, OH	W 32–2	7,200	
October 13	Youngstown	University of Dayton Stadium; Dayton, OH	W 13–12	4,500	
October 21	Marshall	University of Dayton Stadium; Dayton, OH	L 13–19	7,000	
October 28	at Ohio	Ohio Stadium; Athens, OH	L 0–14	10,000	
November 5	at Saint Mary's	Kezar Stadium; San Francisco, CA	T 6–6	10,000	
November 12	at Xavier	Corcoran Field; Cincinnati, OH	L 7–12	8,000	
November 18	Miami (OH)^{†}	University of Dayton Stadium; Dayton, OH	W 20–0	5,500	
December 2	Ohio Wesleyan	University of Dayton Stadium; Dayton, OH	W 19–7		
^{†}Homecoming
