= 1939 Miami Redskins football team =

American college football season

1939 Miami Redskins football
- Conference: Independent
- Record: 1–7–1
- Head coach: Frank Wilton (8th season)
- Home stadium: Miami Field

1939 Midwestern college football independents records
	Conf.			Overall
Team	W	L	T	W		L		T
Central Michigan		–		8	–	1	–	0
No. 13 Notre Dame		–		7	–	2	–	0
Michigan Tech		–		3	–	1	–	1
Ohio		–		6	–	3	–	0
Detroit		–		5	–	3	–	1
Akron		–		5	–	4	–	0
Cincinnati		–		4	–	3	–	2
Ohio Wesleyan		–		5	–	4	–	1
Marquette		–		4	–	4	–	0
Michigan State		–		4	–	4	–	1
Dayton		–		4	–	4	–	1
Michigan State Normal		–		3	–	3	–	1
Wayne		–		4	–	5	–	0
Xavier		–		3	–	5	–	1
Western State Teachers		–		2	–	6	–	1
Miami (OH)		–		1	–	7	–	1
Rankings from AP Poll

The 1939 Miami Redskins football team was an American football team that represented Miami University as an independent during the 1939 college football season. In their eighth season under head coach Frank Wilton, the Redskins compiled a 1–7–1 record.

Miami was ranked at No. 258 (out of 609 teams) in the final Litkenhous Ratings for 1939.

== Schedule ==
Date	Opponent	Site	Result	Attendance	Source
September 30	Mount Union	Miami Field; Oxford, OH	W 7–0		
October 7	at Western State Teachers (MI)	Waldo Stadium; Kalamazoo, MI	L 0–6		
October 14	Marshall	Miami Field; Oxford, OH	L 0–21	6,000	
October 21	Akron	Miami Field; Oxford, OH	L 0–14	7,000	
October 28	Ohio Wesleyan^{†}	Miami Field; Oxford, OH	T 0–0		
November 4	Detroit Tech	Miami Field; Oxford, OH	L 7–19		
November 11	at Ohio	Peden Stadium; Athens, OH (rivalry)	L 7–20		
November 18	at Dayton	University of Dayton Stadium; Dayton, OH	L 0–20	5,500	
November 23	at Cincinnati	Nippert Stadium; Cincinnati, OH (Victory Bell)	L 0–13		
^{†}Homecoming
