= 1939 Ohio Bobcats football team =

American college football season

1939 Ohio Bobcats football
- Conference: Independent
- Record: 6–3
- Head coach: Don Peden (16th season)
- Home stadium: Ohio Stadium

1939 Midwestern college football independents records
	Conf.			Overall
Team	W	L	T	W		L		T
Central Michigan		–		8	–	1	–	0
No. 13 Notre Dame		–		7	–	2	–	0
Michigan Tech		–		3	–	1	–	1
Ohio		–		6	–	3	–	0
Detroit		–		5	–	3	–	1
Akron		–		5	–	4	–	0
Cincinnati		–		4	–	3	–	2
Ohio Wesleyan		–		5	–	4	–	1
Marquette		–		4	–	4	–	0
Michigan State		–		4	–	4	–	1
Dayton		–		4	–	4	–	1
Michigan State Normal		–		3	–	3	–	1
Wayne		–		4	–	5	–	0
Xavier		–		3	–	5	–	1
Western State Teachers		–		2	–	6	–	1
Miami (OH)		–		1	–	7	–	1
Rankings from AP Poll

The 1939 Ohio Bobcats football team was an American football team that represented Ohio University as an independent during the 1939 college football season. In their 16th season under head coach Don Peden, the Bobcats compiled a 6–3 record and outscored opponents by a total of 116 to 82.

Ohio was ranked at No. 124 (out of 609 teams) in the final Litkenhous Ratings for 1939.

== Schedule ==
Date	Opponent	Site	Result	Attendance	Source
September 23	Western Kentucky State Teachers	Ohio Stadium; Athens, OH	L 7–14		
September 29	at Butler	Fairview Bowl; Indianapolis, IN	L 7–12	8,000	
October 7	Western Reserve	Ohio Stadium; Athens, OH	W 14–12		
October 14	Ohio Wesleyan	Ohio Stadium; Athens, OH	L 7–12		
October 20	at Xavier	Corcoran Field; Cincinnati, OH	W 20–6	6,500	
October 28	Dayton	Ohio Stadium; Athens, OH	W 14–0	10,000	
November 4	Morris Harvey	Charleston, WV	W 14–13	6,000	
November 11	Miami (OH)	Ohio Stadium; Athens, OH (rivalry)	W 20–7		
November 18	Western State Teachers (MI)	Waldo Stadium; Kalamazoo, MI	W 13–6		
