= 1939 Notre Dame Fighting Irish football team =

American college football season

1939 Notre Dame Fighting Irish football
- Conference: Independent

Ranking
- AP: No. 13
- Record: 7–2
- Head coach: Elmer Layden (6th season)
- Captain: Johnny Kelly
- Home stadium: Notre Dame Stadium

1939 Midwestern college football independents records
	Conf.			Overall
Team	W	L	T	W		L		T
Central Michigan		–		8	–	1	–	0
No. 13 Notre Dame		–		7	–	2	–	0
Michigan Tech		–		3	–	1	–	1
Ohio		–		6	–	3	–	0
Detroit		–		5	–	3	–	1
Akron		–		5	–	4	–	0
Cincinnati		–		4	–	3	–	2
Ohio Wesleyan		–		5	–	4	–	1
Marquette		–		4	–	4	–	0
Michigan State		–		4	–	4	–	1
Dayton		–		4	–	4	–	1
Michigan State Normal		–		3	–	3	–	1
Wayne		–		4	–	5	–	0
Xavier		–		3	–	5	–	1
Western State Teachers		–		2	–	6	–	1
Miami (OH)		–		1	–	7	–	1
Rankings from AP Poll

The 1939 Notre Dame Fighting Irish football team was an American football team that represented the University of Notre Dame as an independent during the 1939 college football season. In their sixth and final year under head coach Elmer Layden, the Fighting Irish compiled a 7–2 record, outscored opponents by a total of 100 to 73, and were ranked No. 13 in the final AP poll. They won the first six games and were ranked as high as No. 2, but dropped in the rankings after losing two of the final three games to unranked Iowa and No. 4 USC.

End Bud Kerr received first-team honors from the All-America Board, Associated Press, Newspaper Enterprise Association, and Life magazine, among others. Kerr and ullback Milt Piepul received second-team honors from the United Press. Johnny Kelly was the team captain.

The team played its home games at Notre Dame Stadium in Notre Dame, Indiana.

== Schedule ==
Date	Opponent	Rank	Site	Result	Attendance	Source
September 30	Purdue		Notre Dame Stadium; Notre Dame, IN (rivalry)	W 3–0	40,000	
October 7	Georgia Tech		Notre Dame Stadium; Notre Dame, IN (rivalry)	W 17–14	17,322	
October 14	SMU		Notre Dame Stadium; Notre Dame, IN	W 20–19	29,730	
October 21	vs. Navy	No. 2	Municipal Stadium; Cleveland, OH (rivalry)	W 14–7	78,257	
October 28	at Carnegie Tech	No. 2	Pitt Stadium; Pittsburgh, PA	W 7–6	61,420	
November 4	vs. Army	No. 4	Yankee Stadium; Bronx, NY (rivalry)	W 14–0	75,632	
November 11	at Iowa	No. 3	Iowa Stadium; Iowa City, IA	L 6–7	46,000	
November 18	Northwestern	No. 9	Notre Dame Stadium; Notre Dame, IN (rivalry)	W 7–0	49,204	
November 25	No. 4 USC	No. 7	Notre Dame Stadium; Notre Dame, IN (rivalry)	L 12–20	54,799	
Rankings from AP Poll released prior to the game; Source:

== Rankings ==
Ranking movements Legend: ██ Increase in ranking ██ Decrease in ranking ( ) = First-place votes
	Week								
Poll	1	2	3	4	5	6	7	8	Final
AP	2 (16)	2 (12)	4 (12)	3 (11)	9	7	11	11	13
