= 1939 Detroit Titans football team =

American college football season

1939 Detroit Titans football
- Conference: Independent
- Record: 5–3–1
- Head coach: Gus Dorais (15th season)
- Home stadium: University of Detroit Stadium

1939 Midwestern college football independents records
	Conf.			Overall
Team	W	L	T	W		L		T
Central Michigan		–		8	–	1	–	0
No. 13 Notre Dame		–		7	–	2	–	0
Michigan Tech		–		3	–	1	–	1
Ohio		–		6	–	3	–	0
Detroit		–		5	–	3	–	1
Akron		–		5	–	4	–	0
Cincinnati		–		4	–	3	–	2
Ohio Wesleyan		–		5	–	4	–	1
Marquette		–		4	–	4	–	0
Michigan State		–		4	–	4	–	1
Dayton		–		4	–	4	–	1
Michigan State Normal		–		3	–	3	–	1
Wayne		–		4	–	5	–	0
Xavier		–		3	–	5	–	1
Western State Teachers		–		2	–	6	–	1
Miami (OH)		–		1	–	7	–	1
Rankings from AP Poll

The 1939 Detroit Titans football team represented the University of Detroit in the 1939 college football season. Detroit outscored its opponents by a combined total of 149 to 90 and finished with a 5–3–1 record in its 15th year under head coach and College Football Hall of Fame inductee, Gus Dorais.

Detroit was not ranked in the final AP poll, but it was ranked at No. 41 in the Williamson System ratings, and at No. 44 in the final Litkenhous Ratings.

== Schedule ==
Date	Opponent	Site	Result	Attendance	Source
September 22	Central Michigan	University of Detroit Stadium; Detroit, MI	W 20–7	21,500	
September 30	Western State Teachers (MI)	University of Detroit Stadium; Detroit, MI	W 14–0	13,650	
October 14	at Catholic University	Brookland Stadium; Washington, DC	L 13–14	10,000	
October 21	NC State	University of Detroit Stadium; Detroit, MI	W 21–6		
October 28	at Tulsa	Skelly Field; Tulsa, OK	W 16–7	8,400	
November 4	Villanova	University of Detroit Stadium; Detroit, MI	L 6–13		
November 11	Boston College	University of Detroit Stadium; Detroit, MI	L 13–20	10,342	
November 18	Manhattan	University of Detroit Stadium; Detroit, MI	W 36–13		
December 2	at No. 6 Duquesne	Forbes Field; Pittsburgh. PA	T 10–10	23,691	
Rankings from AP Poll released prior to the game
