= 1939 North Dakota Agricultural Bison football team =

American college football season

1939 North Dakota Agricultural Bison football
- Conference: North Central Conference
- Record: 1–6–1 (0–5 NCC)
- Head coach: Casey Finnegan (11th season)
- Captains: Harry Johnson; Cecil Scrank
- Home stadium: Dacotah Field

1939 North Central Conference football standings
	Conf.					Overall
Team	W		L		T	W		L		T
South Dakota State +	4	–	1	–	0	7	–	2	–	0
North Dakota +	4	–	1	–	0	5	–	3	–	0
South Dakota +	4	–	1	–	0	4	–	5	–	0
Iowa State Teachers	3	–	1	–	0	5	–	3	–	1
Omaha	1	–	3	–	0	3	–	5	–	0
Morningside	1	–	5	–	0	2	–	6	–	0
North Dakota Agricultural	0	–	5	–	0	1	–	6	–	1
+ – Conference co-champions

The 1939 North Dakota Agricultural Bison football team was an American football team that represented North Dakota Agricultural College (now known as North Dakota State University) in the North Central Conference (NCC) during the 1939 college football season. In its 11th season under head coach Casey Finnegan, the team compiled a 1–6–1 record (0–5 against NCC opponents) and finished in seventh place out of seven teams in the NCC.

North Dakota Agricultural was ranked at No. 387 in the final Litkenhous Ratings for 1939.

The team played its home games at Dacotah Field in Fargo, North Dakota.

== Schedule ==
Date	Opponent	Site	Result	Attendance	Source
September 22	St. Thomas (MN)*	Dacotah Field; Fargo, ND	L 0–15		
September 29	Morningside	Dacotah Field; Fargo, ND	L 0–15		
October 6	South Dakota	Dacotah Field; Fargo, ND	L 7–19		
October 14	South Dakota State	Dacotah Field; Fargo, ND (rivalry)	L 0–6		
October 21	at Moorhead State*	Moorhead, MN	T 14–14		
October 28	at North Dakota	Memorial Stadium; Grand Forks, ND (Nickel Trophy)	L 0–18	4,000	
November 11	at Montana State*	Gatton Field; Bozeman, MT	W 16–14		
November 18	at Iowa State Teachers	O. R. Latham Stadium; Cedar Falls, IA	L 0–19		
*Non-conference game
