= 1939 Michigan State Normal Hurons football team =

American college football season

1939 Michigan State Normal Hurons football
- Conference: Independent
- Record: 3–3–1
- Head coach: Elton Rynearson (18th season)
- Captain: Joseph V. Pokrywka
- Home stadium: Briggs Field

1939 Midwestern college football independents records
	Conf.			Overall
Team	W	L	T	W		L		T
Central Michigan		–		8	–	1	–	0
No. 13 Notre Dame		–		7	–	2	–	0
Michigan Tech		–		3	–	1	–	1
Ohio		–		6	–	3	–	0
Detroit		–		5	–	3	–	1
Akron		–		5	–	4	–	0
Cincinnati		–		4	–	3	–	2
Ohio Wesleyan		–		5	–	4	–	1
Marquette		–		4	–	4	–	0
Michigan State		–		4	–	4	–	1
Dayton		–		4	–	4	–	1
Michigan State Normal		–		3	–	3	–	1
Wayne		–		4	–	5	–	0
Xavier		–		3	–	5	–	1
Western State Teachers		–		2	–	6	–	1
Miami (OH)		–		1	–	7	–	1
Rankings from AP Poll

The 1939 Michigan State Normal Hurons football team represented Michigan State Normal College (later renamed Eastern Michigan University) as an independent during the 1939 college football season. In their 19th season under head coach Elton Rynearson, the Hurons compiled a record of 3–3–1 and outscored their opponents by a combined total of 68 to 64. Joseph V. Pokrywka was the team captain. The team played its home games at Briggs Field on the school's campus in Ypsilanti, Michigan.

Michigan State Normal was ranked at No. 261 (out of 609 teams) in the final Litkenhous Ratings for 1939.

== Schedule ==
Date	Opponent	Site	Result	Attendance	Source
October 7	at Illinois State	Normal, IL	T 0–0		
October 13	Wayne	Briggs Field; Ypsilanti, MI	L 7–9		
October 21	Central Michigan ^{†}	Briggs Field; Ypsilanti, MI (rivalry)	L 0–14	5,000	
October 27	Kalamazoo	Briggs Field; Ypsilanti, MI	W 19–6		
November 4	at Wayne	Detroit	W 13–6	5,000	
November 10	Alma	Briggs Field; Ypsilanti, MI	W 16–6		
November 18	Bowling Green	Briggs Field; Ypsilanti, MI	L 13–23		
^{†}Homecoming
