= 1939 Cincinnati Bearcats football team =

American college football season

1939 Cincinnati Bearcats football
- Conference: Independent
- Record: 4–3–2
- Head coach: Joseph A. Meyer (2nd season)
- Captain: Orville Kelchner
- Home stadium: Nippert Stadium

1939 Midwestern college football independents records
	Conf.			Overall
Team	W	L	T	W		L		T
Central Michigan		–		8	–	1	–	0
No. 13 Notre Dame		–		7	–	2	–	0
Michigan Tech		–		3	–	1	–	1
Ohio		–		6	–	3	–	0
Detroit		–		5	–	3	–	1
Akron		–		5	–	4	–	0
Cincinnati		–		4	–	3	–	2
Ohio Wesleyan		–		5	–	4	–	1
Marquette		–		4	–	4	–	0
Michigan State		–		4	–	4	–	1
Dayton		–		4	–	4	–	1
Michigan State Normal		–		3	–	3	–	1
Wayne		–		4	–	5	–	0
Xavier		–		3	–	5	–	1
Western State Teachers		–		2	–	6	–	1
Miami (OH)		–		1	–	7	–	1
Rankings from AP Poll

The 1939 Cincinnati Bearcats football team was an American football team that represented the University of Cincinnati as an independent during the 1939 college football season. The Bearcats were led by head coach Joseph A. Meyer and compiled a 4–3–2 record.

Cincinnati was ranked at No. 156 (out of 609 teams) in the final Litkenhous Ratings for 1939.

== Schedule ==
Date	Time	Opponent	Site	Result	Attendance	Source
September 30	8:30 p.m.	Tampa	Nippert Stadium; Cincinnati, OH	W 26–7		
October 6		at Dayton	Dayton Stadium; Dayton, OH	L 2–32	7,200	
October 14		West Virginia	Nippert Stadium; Cincinnati, OH (rivalry)	L 0–7	6,000	
October 21		at Wayne	Keyworth Stadium; Hamtramck, MI	W 21–0	3,500	
October 27		at Western Reserve	Shaw Stadium; East Cleveland, OH	T 0–0	3,500	
November 4		Centre^{†}	Nippert Stadium; Cincinnati, OH	T 6–6		
November 11		Boston University	Nippert Stadium; Cincinnati, OH	L 6–13	7,000	
November 18		South Dakota	Nippert Stadium; Cincinnati, OH	W 13–0		
November 23		Miami (OH)	Nippert Stadium; Cincinnati, OH (Victory Bell)	W 13–0		
^{†}Homecoming; All times are in Eastern time
