= 1939 South Dakota State Jackrabbits football team =

American college football season

1939 South Dakota State Jackrabbits football

NCC co-champion
- Conference: North Central Conference
- Record: 7–2 (4–1 NCC)
- Head coach: Jack V. Barnes (2nd season)
- Home stadium: State Field

1939 North Central Conference football standings
	Conf.					Overall
Team	W		L		T	W		L		T
South Dakota State +	4	–	1	–	0	7	–	2	–	0
North Dakota +	4	–	1	–	0	5	–	3	–	0
South Dakota +	4	–	1	–	0	4	–	5	–	0
Iowa State Teachers	3	–	1	–	0	5	–	3	–	1
Omaha	1	–	3	–	0	3	–	5	–	0
Morningside	1	–	5	–	0	2	–	6	–	0
North Dakota Agricultural	0	–	5	–	0	1	–	6	–	1
+ – Conference co-champions

The 1939 South Dakota State Jackrabbits football team was an American football team that represented South Dakota State University in the North Central Conference (NCC) during the 1939 college football season. In its second season under head coach Jack V. Barnes, the team compiled a 7–2 record, tied for the conference championship, and outscored opponents by a total of 141 to 95.

South Dakota State was ranked at No. 255 (out of 609 teams) in the final Litkenhous Ratings for 1939.

== Schedule ==
Date	Time	Opponent	Site	Result	Attendance	Source
September 23		South Dakota Mines*	State Field; Brookings, SD	W 40–0		
September 30		Moorhead State*	State Field; Brookings, SD	W 20–7	6,000	
October 7		Yankton*	State Field; Brookings, SD	W 6–0		
October 14		North Dakota Agricultural	Dacotah Field; Fargo, ND (rivalry)	W 6–0		
October 21		North Dakota^{†}	State Field; Brookings, SD (Hobo Day)	W 14–13		
October 28		South Dakota	Inman Field; Vermillion, SD (rivalry, Dakota Day)	L 7–21	5,000	
November 4		at Omaha	Benson Stadium; Omaha, NE	W 7–6		
November 11		Morningside	State Field; Brookings, SD	W 34–13		
November 25	2:30 p.m.	at West Texas State*	Buffalo Stadium; Canyon, TX	L 7–35		
*Non-conference game; ^{†}Homecoming; All times are in Central time
