= 1939 Central Michigan Bearcats football team =

American college football season

1939 Central Michigan Bearcats football
- Conference: Independent
- Record: 8–1
- Head coach: Ron Finch (3rd season)
- Home stadium: Alumni Field

1939 Midwestern college football independents records
	Conf.			Overall
Team	W	L	T	W		L		T
Central Michigan		–		8	–	1	–	0
No. 13 Notre Dame		–		7	–	2	–	0
Michigan Tech		–		3	–	1	–	1
Ohio		–		6	–	3	–	0
Detroit		–		5	–	3	–	1
Akron		–		5	–	4	–	0
Cincinnati		–		4	–	3	–	2
Ohio Wesleyan		–		5	–	4	–	1
Marquette		–		4	–	4	–	0
Michigan State		–		4	–	4	–	1
Dayton		–		4	–	4	–	1
Michigan State Normal		–		3	–	3	–	1
Wayne		–		4	–	5	–	0
Xavier		–		3	–	5	–	1
Western State Teachers		–		2	–	6	–	1
Miami (OH)		–		1	–	7	–	1
Rankings from AP Poll

The 1939 Central Michigan Bearcats football team represented Central Michigan College of Education, later renamed Central Michigan University, as an independent during the 1939 college football season. In their third season under head coach Ron Finch, the Bearcats compiled an 8–1 record, shut out six opponents, and outscored their opponents by a combined total of 167 to 40. The team's sole loss was by a 20–7 score to Gus Dorais' 1939 Detroit Titans football team.

Central Michigan was ranked at No. 159 (out of 609 teams) in the final Litkenhous Ratings for 1939.

== Schedule ==
Date	Opponent	Site	Result	Attendance	Source
September 22	at Detroit	University of Detroit Stadium; Detroit, MI	L 7–20	21,500	
September 29	at Ferris Institute	Big Rapids, MI	W 20–0		
September 30	Northern Illinois	Alumni Field; Mount Pleasant, MI	W 6–0		
October 6	Northern State Teachers (MI)	Alumni Field; Mount Pleasant, MI	W 37–0		
October 14	at Eastern Kentucky	Richmond, KY	W 18–14		
October 21	at Michigan State Normal	Briggs Field; Ypsilanti, MI (rivalry)	W 14–0	5,000	
October 27	Ball State	Alumni Field; Mount Pleasant, MI	W 7–0		
November 11	Wayne^{†}	Alumni Field; Mount Pleasant, MI	W 33–6	5,500	
	Grand Rapids	Alumni Field; Mount Pleasant, MI	W 25–0		
^{†}Homecoming
