= 1939 Marquette Golden Avalanche football team =

American college football season

1939 Marquette Golden Avalanche football
- Conference: Independent
- Record: 4–4
- Head coach: Paddy Driscoll (3rd season)
- Home stadium: Marquette Stadium

1939 Midwestern college football independents records
	Conf.			Overall
Team	W	L	T	W		L		T
Central Michigan		–		8	–	1	–	0
No. 13 Notre Dame		–		7	–	2	–	0
Michigan Tech		–		3	–	1	–	1
Ohio		–		6	–	3	–	0
Detroit		–		5	–	3	–	1
Akron		–		5	–	4	–	0
Cincinnati		–		4	–	3	–	2
Ohio Wesleyan		–		5	–	4	–	1
Marquette		–		4	–	4	–	0
Michigan State		–		4	–	4	–	1
Dayton		–		4	–	4	–	1
Michigan State Normal		–		3	–	3	–	1
Wayne		–		4	–	5	–	0
Xavier		–		3	–	5	–	1
Western State Teachers		–		2	–	6	–	1
Miami (OH)		–		1	–	7	–	1
Rankings from AP Poll

The 1939 Marquette Golden Avalanche football team was an American football team that represented Marquette University as an independent during the 1939 college football season. In its third season under head coach Paddy Driscoll, the team compiled a 4–4 record and outscored opponents by a total of 99 to 95.

Marquette was ranked at No. 66 (out of 609 teams) in the final Litkenhous Ratings for 1939.

The team played its home games at Marquette Stadium in Milwaukee.

== Schedule ==
Date	Opponent	Site	Result	Attendance	Source
September 30	at Wisconsin	Camp Randall Stadium; Madison, WI	L 13–14	29,000	
October 6	Kansas State	Marquette Stadium; Milwaukee, WI	L 0–3	15,000	
October 14	at Michigan State	Macklin Field; East Lansing, MI	W 17–14	12,000	
October 21	at No. 18 SMU	Cotton Bowl; Dallas, TX	L 0–16	8,500	
October 28	Arizona^{†}	Marquette Stadium; Milwaukee, WI	W 13–6	10,000	
November 4	at No. 13 Duquesne	Forbes Field; Pittsburgh, PA	L 13–21	12,000	
November 11	Iowa State	Marquette Stadium; Milwaukee, WI	W 21–2	15,000	
November 18	at Texas Tech	Tech Field; Lubbock, TX	W 22–19	8,000	
^{†}Homecoming; Rankings from AP Poll released prior to the game
