= 1939 South Dakota Coyotes football team =

American college football season

1939 South Dakota Coyotes football
- Conference: North Central Conference
- Record: 4–5 (4–1 NCC)
- Head coach: Harry Gamage (6th season)
- Home stadium: Inman Field

1939 North Central Conference football standings
	Conf.					Overall
Team	W		L		T	W		L		T
South Dakota State +	4	–	1	–	0	7	–	2	–	0
North Dakota +	4	–	1	–	0	5	–	3	–	0
South Dakota +	4	–	1	–	0	4	–	5	–	0
Iowa State Teachers	3	–	1	–	0	5	–	3	–	1
Omaha	1	–	3	–	0	3	–	5	–	0
Morningside	1	–	5	–	0	2	–	6	–	0
North Dakota Agricultural	0	–	5	–	0	1	–	6	–	1
+ – Conference co-champions

The 1939 South Dakota Coyotes football team was an American football team that represented the University of South Dakota in the North Central Conference (NCC) during the 1939 college football season. In its sixth season under head coach Harry Gamage, the team compiled a 4–5 record (4–1 against NCC opponents), finished in third place out of seven teams in the NCC, and outscored opponents by a total of 106 to 61.

South Dakota was ranked at No. 251 (out of 609 teams) in the final Litkenhous Ratings for 1939.

The team played its home games at Inman Field in Vermillion, South Dakota.

== Schedule ==
Date	Opponent	Site	Result	Attendance	Source
September 23	at Pacific (CA)	Charles C. Hughes Stadium; Sacramento, CA	L 0–6		
September 30	at Iowa	Iowa Stadium; Iowa City, IA	L 0–41	16,000	
October 6	at North Dakota Agricultural	Dacotah Field; Fargo, ND	W 19–7		
October 14	Omaha	Inman Field; Vermillion, SD	W 14–6		
October 21	at Morningside	Stockyards Park; Sioux City, IA	W 7–6	4,000	
October 28	South Dakota State	Inman Field; Vermillion, SD	W 21–7	5,000	
November 11	Iowa State Teachers	Inman Field; Vermillion, SD	L 0–14		
November 18	at Cincinnati	Nippert Stadium; Cincinnati, OH	L 0–13		
November 24	at Saint Louis	Walsh Memorial Stadium; St. Louis, MO	L 0–6		
