= 1939 Western Reserve Red Cats football team =

American college football season

1939 Western Reserve Red Cats football
- Conference: Big Four Conference
- Record: 5–3–1 (1–2 Big Four)
- Head coach: Bill Edwards (5th season)
- Home stadium: League Park; Shaw Stadium

The 1939 Western Reserve Red Cats football team represented the Western Reserve University, now known as Case Western Reserve University, during the 1939 college football season. The team was led by fifth-year head coach Bill Edwards, assisted by Gene Myslenski and Roy A. "Dugan" Miller.

Western Reserve was ranked at No. 134 (out of 609 teams) in the final Litkenhous Ratings for 1939.

Home games were played at League Park and Shaw Stadium.

== Schedule ==
Date	Opponent	Site	Result	Attendance	Source
September 30	Dayton*	League Park; Cleveland, OH	W 7–0	7,000	
October 7	at Ohio*	Ohio Complex; Athens, OH	L 12–14		
October 14	at Boston University*	Fenway Park; Boston, MA	W 19–14	7,000	
October 20	Baldwin–Wallace	Shaw Stadium; East Cleveland, OH	L 7–8	12,000	
October 27	Cincinnati*	Shaw Stadium; East Cleveland, OH	T 0–0	3,500	
November 4	Ohio Wesleyan*	League Park; Cleveland, OH	W 32–6		
November 11	Kent State*	League Park; Cleveland, OH	W 38–0	8,000	
November 18	at John Carroll	Municipal Stadium; Cleveland, OH	L 0–6	16,500	
November 23	Case	League Park; Cleveland, OH	W 18–0	12,000	
*Non-conference game
