= Lyle Rockenbach =

American football player (1915–2005)

- Rockenbach with Michigan State, 1939

No. 68
- Position: Guard

Personal information
- Born: March 1, 1915; Prairie View, Illinois, U.S.
- Died: November 8, 2005 (aged 90); Jacksonville, Florida, U.S.
- Listed height: 5 ft 9 in (1.75 m)
- Listed weight: 192 lb (87 kg)

Career information
- High school: Crystal Lake Central (Crystal Lake, Illinois)
- College: Michigan State

Career history
- Detroit Lions (1943)
- Stats at Pro Football Reference

Lyle James "Rocky" Rockenbach (March 1, 1915 – November 8, 2005) was an American football guard. He played college football for Michigan State from 1937 to 1939 and professional football for the Detroit Lions of the National Football League (NFL) in 1943.

== Early life ==
Rockenbach was born in 1915, at Prairie View, Illinois. He was part of a family with 14 children. He attended Crystal Lake Central High School in Crystal Lake, Illinois. He was a star basketball player at Crystal Lake.

== Michigan State ==
Rockenbach was recruited to Michigan State College (later known as Michigan State University) by basketball coach Benjamin Van Alstyne. He reported to the basketball team, but was dropped from the team after several weeks. He then tried out for the football team, having played at the guard position in high school. He began the 1937 season as a backup guard, but became a starter by the end of the season. He blocked three punts in a single game against Pop Warner's Temple team in 1937. As a junior, he was a blocker for All-American John Pingel. He was chosen as a co-captain of the 1939 Michigan State Spartans football team, and at the end of the 1939 season, he was selected as the team's most valuable player.

== Detroit Lions ==
After graduating from Michigan State, he became a high school coach in Howell, Michigan. In August 1943, he signed with the Detroit Lions of the National Football League (NFL). He appeared in eight or nine games for the Lions during the 1943 NFL season.

== Later life ==
In April 1944, Rockenbach enlisted in the United States Navy.

Rockenbach died on November 8, 2005, at Westminster Woods at Julington Creek Retirement Community in Jacksonville, Florida.
