= Michael Kinek =

American football player (1917–1991)

Profile
- Position: End

Personal information
- Born: August 11, 1917; Akron, Ohio, U.S.
- Died: October 6, 1991 (age 74)
- Listed height: 6 ft 1 in (1.85 m)
- Listed weight: 200 lb (91 kg)

Career information
- High school: Whiting
- College: Michigan State University

Career history
- Cleveland Rams (1940)
- Stats at Pro Football Reference

Michael Kenneth Kinek (August 11, 1917 – October 6, 1991) was an American football player.

Kinek was born in 1917 in Akron, Ohio. He attended Whiting High School in Whiting, Indiana.

He played college football for Michigan State College (later known as Michigan State University) from 1937 to 1939. He was also regarded as a reliable, long-distance placekicker. At the end of the 1939 season, he was elected by his teammates as an honorary co-captain. Michigan State coach Charley Bachman called Kinek the best defensive end in Michigan State history.

In February 1940, Kinek signed with the Cleveland Rams of the National Football League. He appeared in two games for the Rams.

Kinek died in 1991.
