= 1939 Marshall Thundering Herd football team =

American college football season

1939 Marshall Thundering Herd football
- Conference: West Virginia Intercollegiate Athletic Conference
- Record: 9–2 (3–0 WVIAC)
- Head coach: Cam Henderson (5th season)
- Captains: "Boot" Elkins; Zack Kush
- Home stadium: Fairfield Stadium

1939 West Virginia Intercollegiate Athletic Conference football standings
	Conf.					Overall
Team	W		L		T	W		L		T
West Liberty State $	5	–	0	–	0	8	–	2	–	0
Glenville State	6	–	2	–	1	6	–	2	–	1
Concord	3	–	1	–	1	4	–	4	–	1
Morris Harvey	2	–	2	–	1	5	–	3	–	1
New River State	2	–	3	–	0	0	–	3	–	4
Potomac State	1	–	3	–	0	2	–	5	–	1
West Virginia Wesleyan	1	–	3	–	0	1	–	8	–	0
Salem	1	–	5	–	2	1	–	6	–	2
Fairmont State	1	–	5	–	0	2	–	6	–	0
Shepherd	0	–	4	–	0	1	–	6	–	0
Marshall *	3	–	0	–	0	9	–	2	–	0
Davis & Elkins *	3	–	0	–	0	5	–	4	–	1
Bethany (WV) *	1	–	1	–	1	3	–	3	–	1
$ – Conference champion; * – Did not qualify for conference standings Ties did not count in conference standings.

The 1939 Marshall Thundering Herd football team was an American football team that represented Marshall University as a member of the West Virginia Intercollegiate Athletic Conference during the 1939 college football season. In its fifth season under head coach Cam Henderson, the team compiled a 9–2 record and outscored opponents by a total of 286 to 84. Marshall had a 3–0 record against WVIAC opponents, but did not play enough conference games to qualify for the WVAC standings. "Boot" Elkins and Zack Kush were the team captains.

Marshall was ranked at No. 64 (out of 609 teams) in the final Litkenhous Ratings for 1939.

== Schedule ==
Date	Opponent	Site	Result	Attendance	Source
September 23	Geneva*	Fairfield Stadium; Huntington, WV	W 41–13		
September 30	VPI*	Fairfield Stadium; Huntington, WV	W 20–0		
October 7	Salem	Fairfield Stadium; Huntington, WV	W 64–0		
October 14	at Miami (OH)*	Miami Field; Oxford, OH	W 21–0	6,000	
October 21	at Dayton*	University of Dayton Stadium; Dayton, OH	W 19–13	7,000	
October 28	at Scranton*	Scranton, PA	L 0–20	4,000	
November 4	Wake Forest*	Fairfield Stadium; Huntington, WV	L 13–14	8,000	
November 11	Toledo*	Fairfield Stadium; Huntington, WV	W 14–12		
November 18	at Xavier*	Cincinnati, OH	W 20–0	5,000	
November 23	West Virginia Wesleyan^{†}	Fairfield Stadium; Huntington, WV	W 47–13		
November 25	at Morris Harvey	Charleston, WV	W 27–0		
*Non-conference game; ^{†}Homecoming
