= 1939 North Dakota Fighting Sioux football team =

American college football season

1939 North Dakota Fighting Sioux football

NCC co-champion
- Conference: North Central Conference
- Record: 5–3 (4–1 NCC)
- Head coach: Charles A. West (11th season)
- Home stadium: Memorial Stadium

1939 North Central Conference football standings
	Conf.					Overall
Team	W		L		T	W		L		T
South Dakota State +	4	–	1	–	0	7	–	2	–	0
North Dakota +	4	–	1	–	0	5	–	3	–	0
South Dakota +	4	–	1	–	0	4	–	5	–	0
Iowa State Teachers	3	–	1	–	0	5	–	3	–	1
Omaha	1	–	3	–	0	3	–	5	–	0
Morningside	1	–	5	–	0	2	–	6	–	0
North Dakota Agricultural	0	–	5	–	0	1	–	6	–	1
+ – Conference co-champions

The 1939 North Dakota Fighting Sioux football team, also known as the Nodaks, was an American football team that represented the University of North Dakota in the North Central Conference (NCC) during the 1939 college football season. In its 11th year under head coach Charles A. West, the team compiled a 5–3 record (4–1 against NCC opponents), shared the conference championship with South Dakota and South Dakota State, and outscored opponents by a total of 124 to 78.

North Dakota was ranked at No. 207 (out of 609 teams) in the final Litkenhous Ratings for 1939.

== Schedule ==
Date	Opponent	Site	Result	Attendance	Source
September 22	Omaha	Memorial Stadium; Grand Forks, ND	W 13–0		
September 29	Luther*	Memorial Stadium; Grand Forks, ND	W 19–0		
October 6	Iowa State Teachers	Memorial Stadium; Grand Forks, ND	W 19–6		
October 14	at Toledo*	University Stadium; Toledo, OH	L 7–26	5,000	
October 21	at South Dakota State	State Field; Brookings, SD	L 13–14		
October 28	North Dakota Agricultural	Memorial Stadium; Grand Forks, ND (Nickel Trophy)	W 18–0	4,000	
November 10	at St. Thomas (MN)*	Saint Paul, MN	L 7–25	2,000	
November 18	Morningside	Memorial Stadium; Grand Forks, ND	W 28–7		
*Non-conference game
