= 1939 Xavier Musketeers football team =

American college football season

1939 Xavier Musketeers football
- Conference: Independent
- Record: 3–5–1
- Head coach: Clem Crowe (5th season)
- Home stadium: Corcoran Field

1939 Midwestern college football independents records
| | Conf. | | | Overall |
| Team | W | L | T | W | | L | | T |
|---|---|---|---|---|---|---|---|---|
| Central Michigan | | – | | 8 | – | 1 | – | 0 |
| No. 13 Notre Dame | | – | | 7 | – | 2 | – | 0 |
| Michigan Tech | | – | | 3 | – | 1 | – | 1 |
| Ohio | | – | | 6 | – | 3 | – | 0 |
| Detroit | | – | | 5 | – | 3 | – | 1 |
| Akron | | – | | 5 | – | 4 | – | 0 |
| Cincinnati | | – | | 4 | – | 3 | – | 2 |
| Ohio Wesleyan | | – | | 5 | – | 4 | – | 1 |
| Marquette | | – | | 4 | – | 4 | – | 0 |
| Michigan State | | – | | 4 | – | 4 | – | 1 |
| Dayton | | – | | 4 | – | 4 | – | 1 |
| Michigan State Normal | | – | | 3 | – | 3 | – | 1 |
| Wayne | | – | | 4 | – | 5 | – | 0 |
| Xavier | | – | | 3 | – | 5 | – | 1 |
| Western State Teachers | | – | | 2 | – | 6 | – | 1 |
| Miami (OH) | | – | | 1 | – | 7 | – | 1 |
Rankings from AP Poll

The 1939 Xavier Musketeers football team was an American football team that represented Xavier University as an independent during the 1939 college football season. In their fifth season under head coach Clem Crowe, the Musketeers compiled a 3–5–1 record and were outscored by a total of 94 to 43.

Xavier was ranked at No. 153 (out of 609 teams) in the final Litkenhous Ratings for 1939.

The team played its home games at Corcoran Field, also known as Xavier Stadium, in Cincinnati.

== Schedule ==
| Date | Opponent | Site | Result | Attendance | Source |
|---|---|---|---|---|---|
| September 29 | St. Mary's (TX) | Corcoran Field; Cincinnati, OH | L 0–6 | | |
| October 7 | Tennessee Tech | Corcoran Field; Cincinnati, OH | W 19–0 | 4,500 | |
| October 15 | at Saint Vincent | Bearcat Stadium; Latrobe, PA | T 0–0 | 6,500 | |
| October 20 | Ohio | Corcoran Field; Cincinnati, OH | L 6–20 | 6,500 | |
| October 28 | Kentucky | Corcoran Field; Cincinnati, OH | L 0–21 | 8,000 | |
| November 5 | at Saint Joseph's (IN) | Rensselaer, IN | W 6–0 | 2,500 | |
| November 12 | Dayton | Corcoran Field; Cincinnati, OH | W 12–7 | 8,000 | |
| November 18 | Marshall | Corcoran Field; Cincinnati, OH | L 0–20 | 5,000 | |
| November 23 | Toledo | Corcoran Field; Cincinnati, OH | L 0–20 | 5,000 | |
