= 1939 Western State Teachers Broncos football team =

American college football season

1939 Western State Teachers Broncos football
- Conference: Independent
- Record: 2–6–1
- Head coach: Mike Gary (11th season)
- MVP: Dave Kribs
- Captain: Art Guse
- Home stadium: Waldo Stadium

1939 Midwestern college football independents records
	Conf.			Overall
Team	W	L	T	W		L		T
Central Michigan		–		8	–	1	–	0
No. 13 Notre Dame		–		7	–	2	–	0
Michigan Tech		–		3	–	1	–	1
Ohio		–		6	–	3	–	0
Detroit		–		5	–	3	–	1
Akron		–		5	–	4	–	0
Cincinnati		–		4	–	3	–	2
Ohio Wesleyan		–		5	–	4	–	1
Marquette		–		4	–	4	–	0
Michigan State		–		4	–	4	–	1
Dayton		–		4	–	4	–	1
Michigan State Normal		–		3	–	3	–	1
Wayne		–		4	–	5	–	0
Xavier		–		3	–	5	–	1
Western State Teachers		–		2	–	6	–	1
Miami (OH)		–		1	–	7	–	1
Rankings from AP Poll

The 1939 Western State Teachers Broncos football team represented Western State Teachers College (later renamed Western Michigan University) as an independent during the 1939 college football season. In their 11th season under head coach Mike Gary, the Broncos compiled a 2–6–1 record and were outscored by their opponents, 85 to 51. The team played its home games at Waldo Stadium in Kalamazoo, Michigan. The stadium, built at a cost of $270,000, was dedicated on November 4, 1939, prior to the game against Western Kentucky.

Center Art Guse was the team captain. Halfback Dave Kribs received the team's most outstanding player award.

Western State was ranked at No. 179 (out of 609 teams) in the final Litkenhous Ratings for 1939.

== Schedule ==
Date	Opponent	Site	Result	Attendance	Source
September 30	at Detroit	University of Detroit Stadium; Detroit, MI	L 0–14	13,650	
October 7	Miami (OH)	Waldo Stadium; Kalamazoo, MI	W 6–0		
October 14	Akron	Waldo Stadium; Kalamazoo, MI	W 6–0		
October 21	at Iowa State Teachers	O. R. Latham Stadium; Cedar Falls, IA	T 13–13	4,500	
October 28	at Toledo	Glass Bowl; Toledo, OH	L 0–6		
November 4	Western Kentucky State Teachers	Waldo Stadium; Kalamazoo, MI	L 14–20		
November 11	Butler	Waldo Stadium; Kalamazoo, MI	L 0–12		
November 18	Ohio	Waldo Stadium; Kalamazoo, MI	L 6–13		
November 23	Wayne	Keyworth Stadium; Hamtramck, MI	L 6–7	6,000	
