= Dwight Hafeli =

American football and basketball player and coach (1912–1983)

Biographical details
- Born: September 1, 1912; Johnston City, Illinois, U.S.
- Died: July 17, 1983 (aged 70); St. Louis, Missouri, U.S.

Playing career

Football
- 1933–1934: Washington University
- Position: End

Coaching career (HC unless noted)

Football
- 1937–1940: Kenyon

Basketball
- 1937–1941: Kenyon
- 1942–1949: Missouri Mines

Head coaching record
- Overall: 5–19–3 (football); 40–94 (basketball)

Dwight Lovell Hafeli (September 1, 1912 – July 17, 1983) was an American football and basketball player and coach. He played college football for Washington University in St. Louis as End from 1933 to 1934. Hafeli was named AP honorable mention All-American end in 1936. He was selected by the Chicago Cardinals in the ninth round with the 83rd overall pick in the 1937 NFL draft. He served as the head football coach and basketball coach at Kenyon College in Ohio. Hafeli was also the head basketball coach at the Missouri School of Mines and Metallurgy—now known as Missouri University of Science and Technology—from 1942 to 1949.

== Head coaching record ==
=== Football ===
Year	Team	Overall	Conference	Standing	Bowl/playoffs
Kenyon Lords (Ohio Athletic Conference) (1937–1940)
1937	Kenyon	2–4–1	1–1–1	T–8th	
1938	Kenyon	1–5	1–3	T–13th	
1939	Kenyon	0–6–1	0–3	18th	
1940	Kenyon	2–4–1	1–2–1	T–12th	
Kenyon:		5–19–3	3–9–2		
Total:		5–19–3			
