= Frank Maher (American football) =

American football player (1918–1992)

No. 76, 9
- Position: Back

Personal information
- Born: May 8, 1918; Detroit, Michigan, U.S.
- Died: April 11, 1992 (aged 73); Toledo, Ohio, U.S.
- Listed height: 6 ft 1 in (1.85 m)
- Listed weight: 195 lb (88 kg)

Career information
- College: Toledo
- NFL draft: 1940: 10th round, 83rd overall pick

Career history
- Pittsburgh Steelers (1941); Cleveland Rams (1941)
- Stats at Pro Football Reference

Francis Xavier Maher Jr. (May 8, 1918 – April 11, 1992) was an American professional football player who was a running back for one season in the National Football League (NFL) with the Cleveland Rams and Pittsburgh Steelers. He was selected in the tenth round of the 1940 NFL draft. Prior, he served in World War II for the United States Army.
