= 1939 Southeastern Conference football season =

- Sport: Football
- Duration: September 20, 1939 – January 1, 1940
- Teams: 13
- Champion: Tennessee; Georgia Tech; Tulane

SEC seasons
- ← 1938 1940 →

1939 Southeastern Conference football standings
	Conf.					Overall
Team		W		L			W		L
No. 2 Tennessee +	6	–	0	–	0	10	–	1	–	0
No. 16 Georgia Tech +	6	–	0	–	0	8	–	2	–	0
No. 5 Tulane +	5	–	0	–	0	8	–	1	–	1
Mississippi State	3	–	2	–	0	8	–	2	–	0
Ole Miss	2	–	2	–	0	7	–	2	–	0
Kentucky	2	–	2	–	1	6	–	2	–	1
Auburn	3	–	3	–	1	5	–	5	–	1
Alabama	2	–	3	–	1	5	–	3	–	1
Georgia	1	–	3	–	0	5	–	6	–	0
LSU	1	–	5	–	0	4	–	5	–	0
Vanderbilt	1	–	6	–	0	2	–	7	–	1
Florida	0	–	3	–	1	5	–	5	–	1
Sewanee	0	–	3	–	0	3	–	5	–	0
+ – Conference co-champions; Rankings from AP Poll

The 1939 Southeastern Conference football season was the seventh season of college football played by the member schools of the Southeastern Conference (SEC) and was a part of the 1939 college football season. Tennessee compiled an 10–1 overall record, Georgia Tech compiled an 8–2 overall record, and Tulane compiled an 8–1–1 record, with Tennessee and Georgia Tech each having a conference record of 6–0 and Tulane having a conference record of 5–0. The three teams were SEC co-champions.

== Results and team statistics ==
Conf. rank	Team	Head coach	Overall record	Conf. record	AP final	PPG	PAG
T–1	Tennessee	Robert Neyland	10–1–0 (.909)	6–0–0 (1.000)	No. 2	19.3	1.3
T–1	Tulane	Red Dawson	8–1–1 (.850)	5–0–0 (1.000)	No. 5	19.4	6.0
T–1	Georgia Tech	William Alexander	8–2–0 (.800)	6–0–0 (1.000)	No. 16	15.0	5.6
4	Mississippi State	Allyn McKeen	8–2–0 (.800)	3–2–0 (.600)		21.6	3.2
5	Ole Miss	Harry Mehre	7–2–0 (.778)	2–2–0 (.500)		25.6	7.1
6	Kentucky	Albert D. Kirwan	6–2–1 (.722)	2–2–1 (.500)		17.9	7.1
7	Auburn	Jack Meagher	5–5–1 (.500)	3–3–1 (.500)		6.5	6.3
8	Alabama	Frank Thomas	5–3–1 (.611)	2–3–1 (.417)		11.2	5.9
9	Georgia	Wally Butts	5–6–0 (.455)	1–3–0 (.250)		10.3	8.9
10	LSU	Bernie Moore	4–5–0 (.444)	1–5–0 (.167)		12.3	12.9
11	Vanderbilt	Ray Morrison	2–7–1 (.250)	1–6–0 (.143)		9.6	16.5
12	Florida	Josh Cody	5–5–1 (.500)	0–3–1 (.125)		7.1	6.0
13	Sewanee	Harry E. Clark	3–5–0 (.375)	0–3–0 (.000)		5.4	18.8

Key
AP final = Rankings from AP sports writers. See 1939 college football rankings
PPG = Average of points scored per game
PAG = Average of points allowed per game

== Schedule ==
Index to colors and formatting
SEC member won
SEC member lost
SEC member tie
SEC teams in **bold**

=== Week Zero ===
Date	Visiting team	Home team	Site	Result	Attendance	Ref.
September 20	Tennessee Tech	**Vanderbilt**	Dudley Field • Nashville, TN	**T** 13–13	8,000	
September 23	Howard (AL)	**Mississippi State**	Scott Field • Starkville, MS	**W** 45–0		
September 23	Stetson	**Florida**	Florida Field • Gainesville, FL	**W** 21–0	5,000	

=== Week One ===
Date	Visiting team	Home team	Site	Result	Attendance	Ref.
September 29	**Tennessee**	NC State	Riddick Stadium • Raleigh, NC	**W** 13–0	12,000	
September 29	Birmingham–Southern	**Auburn**	Cramton Bowl • Montgomery, AL	**W** 6–0	10,000	
September 30	Clemson	**Tulane**	Tulane Stadium • New Orleans, LA	**W** 7–6	25,000	
September 30	Arkansas	**Mississippi State**	Crump Stadium • Memphis, TN	**W** 19–0	10,000	
September 30	VMI	**Kentucky**	McLean Stadium • Lexington, KY	**W** 21–0	5,000	
September 30	Howard (AL)	**Alabama**	Denny Stadium • Tuscaloosa, AL	**W** 21–0	6,000	
September 30	The Citadel	**Georgia**	Sanford Stadium • Athens, GA	**W** 26–0	15,000	
September 30	**Vanderbilt**	Rice	Rice Field • Houston, TX	**W** 13–12	20,000	
September 30	**Florida**	Texas	War Memorial Stadium • Austin, TX	**L** 0–12	17,000	
September 30	**Sewanee**	Washington and Lee	Wilson Field • Lexington, VA	**L** 0–9	1,500	
September 30	**Ole Miss**	**LSU**	Tiger Stadium • Baton Rouge, LA (rivalry)	**OM** 14–7		

=== Week Two ===
Date	Visiting team	Home team	Site	Result	Attendance	Ref.
October 6	Georgia	Furman	Sirrine Stadium • Greenville, SC	**L** 0–20	12,000	
October 7	Ole Miss	Southwestern (TN)	Crump Stadium • Memphis, TN	**W** 41–0	12,000	
October 7	Alabama	Fordham	Polo Grounds • New York, NY	**W** 7–6	41,454	
October 7	LSU	Holy Cross	Fitton Field • Worcester, MA	**W** 26–7	24,000	
October 7	Georgia Tech	Notre Dame	Notre Dame Stadium • Notre Dame, IN	**L** 14–17	30,000	
October 7	Sewanee	**Tennessee**	Shields–Watkins Field • Knoxville, TN	**TEN** 40–0	18,000	
October 7	Auburn	**Tulane**	Tulane Stadium • New Orleans, LA (rivalry)	**TUL** 12–0	28,000	
October 7	Mississippi State	**Florida**	Florida Field • Gainesville, FL	**MSS** 14–0		
October 7	Kentucky	**Vanderbilt**	Dudley Field • Nashville, TN (rivalry)	**KEN** 21–13	10,000	

=== Week Three ===
Date	Visiting team	Home team	Site	Result	Attendance	Ref.
October 12	**Florida**	Boston College	Fenway Park • Boston, MA	**W** 7–0	20,000	
October 14	Howard (AL)	**Georgia Tech**	Grant Field • Atlanta, GA	**W** 35–0	10,000	
October 14	Fordham	**Tulane**	Tulane Stadium • New Orleans, LA	**W** 7–0	43,000	
October 14	**Ole Miss**	Centenary	Centenary College Stadium • Shreveport, LA	**W** 34–0	7,500	
October 14	Oglethorpe	**Kentucky**	McLean Stadium • Lexington, KY	**W** 59–0		
October 14	Mercer	**Alabama**	Denny Stadium • Tuscaloosa, AL	**W** 20–0	5,000	
October 14	Rice	**LSU**	Tiger Stadium • Baton Rouge, LA	**W** 7–0	28,000	
October 14	Holy Cross	**Georgia**	Sanford Stadium • Athens, GA	**L** 0–13	15,000	
October 14	VMI	**Vanderbilt**	Dudley Field • Nashville, TN	**L** 13–20	5,000	
October 14	**Mississippi State**	**Auburn**	Legion Field • Birmingham, AL	**AUB** 7–0	10,000	
October 15	**Tennessee**	Chattanooga	Chamberlain Field • Chattanooga, TN	**W** 28–0	6,987	

=== Week Four ===
Date	Visiting team	Home team	Site	Result	Attendance	Ref.
October 20	Tennessee Tech	**Sewanee**	Hardee Field • Sewanee, TN	**W** 9–7		
October 21	Southwestern (TN)	**Mississippi State**	Scott Field • Starkville, MS	**W** 37–0	5,000	
October 21	Saint Louis	No. 17 **Ole Miss**	Hemingway Stadium • Oxford, MS	**W** 42–0		
October 21	Loyola (LA)	**LSU**	Tiger Stadium • Baton Rouge, LA	**W** 20–0	10,000	
October 21	Tampa	**Florida**	Florida Field • Gainesville, FL	**W** 7–0	6,000	
October 21	No. 14 North Carolina	No. 4 **Tulane**	Tulane Stadium • New Orleans, LA	**T** 14–14	34,000	
October 21	**Auburn**	Manhattan	Polo Grounds • New York, NY	**L** 0–7	7,500–8,000	
October 21	No. 8 **Alabama**	No. 5 **Tennessee**	Shields–Watkins Field • Knoxville, TN (rivalry)	**TEN** 21–0	40,000	
October 21	**Vanderbilt**	**Georgia Tech**	Grant Field • Atlanta, GA (rivalry)	**VAN** 14–6	19,000	
October 21	**Georgia**	**Kentucky**	Du Pont Manual Stadium • Louisville, KY	**KEN** 13–6	14,000	
^{#}Rankings from AP Poll released prior to game.

=== Week Five ===
Date	Visiting team	Home team	Site	Result	Attendance	Ref.
October 27	**Sewanee**	Southwestern (TN)	Crump Stadium • Memphis, TN (rivalry)	**W** 6–0		
October 28	Mercer	No. 1 **Tennessee**	Shields–Watkins Field • Knoxville, TN	**W** 17–0	6,000	
October 28	**Kentucky**	Xavier	Xavier Stadium • Cincinnati, OH	**W** 21–0	8,000	
October 28	**Florida**	Maryland	Byrd Stadium • College Park, MD	**W** 14–0	10,000	
October 28	**Georgia**	NYU	Yankee Stadium • Bronx, NY	**L** 13–14	15,000	
October 28	**Auburn**	**Georgia Tech**	Grant Field • Atlanta, GA (rivalry)	**GT** 7–6	18,000	
October 28	No. 14 **Ole Miss**	No. 2 **Tulane**	Tulane Stadium • New Orleans, LA (rivalry)	**TUL** 18–6	37,000	
October 28	**Mississippi State**	No. 20 **Alabama**	Denny Stadium • Tuscaloosa, AL (rivalry)	**ALA** 7–0	15,000	
October 28	**LSU**	**Vanderbilt**	Dudley Field • Nashville, TN	**LSU** 12–6	10,000	
^{#}Rankings from AP Poll released prior to game.

=== Week Six ===
Date	Visiting team	Home team	Site	Result	Attendance	Ref.
November 3	Mercer	**Georgia**	Sanford Stadium • Athens, GA	**W** 16–9	6,000	
November 4	Birmingham–Southern	**Mississippi State**	Scott Field • Starkville, MS	**W** 28–0	6,000	
November 4	No. 12 Duke	**Georgia Tech**	Grant Field • Atlanta, GA	**L** 6–7	30,000	
November 4	**Auburn**	Boston College	Fenway Park • Boston, MA	**L** 7–13	15,000	
November 4	**Florida**	South Carolina	Columbia Municipal Stadium • Columbia, SC	**L** 0–6	5,000	
November 4	**Sewanee**	Chattanooga	Chamberlain Field • Chattanooga, TN	**L** 7–10		
November 4	No. 1 **Tennessee**	No. 18 **LSU**	Tiger Stadium • Baton Rouge, LA	**TEN** 20–0	42,000	
November 4	**Vanderbilt**	**Ole Miss**	Crump Stadium • Memphis, TN (rivalry)	**OM** 14–7	12,000	
November 4	No. 15 **Kentucky**	No. 19 **Alabama**	Legion Field • Birmingham, AL	**T** 7–7	11,000	
^{#}Rankings from AP Poll released prior to game.

=== Week Seven ===
Date	Visiting team	Home team	Site	Result	Attendance	Ref.
November 11	The Citadel	No. 1 **Tennessee**	Shields–Watkins Field • Knoxville, TN	**W** 34–0	8,000	
November 11	No. 19 **Ole Miss**	Mississippi State Teachers	Faulkner Field • Hattiesburg, MS	**W** 27–7		
November 11	Villanova	**Auburn**	Legion Field • Birmingham, AL	**W** 10–9	15,000	
November 11	No. 18 **Kentucky**	**Georgia Tech**	Grant Field • Atlanta, GA	**GT** 13–6	25,000	
November 11	No. 20 **Alabama**	No. 7 **Tulane**	Tulane Stadium • New Orleans, LA	**TUL** 13–0	52,000	
November 11	**Mississippi State**	**LSU**	Tiger Stadium • Baton Rouge, LA (rivalry)	**MSS** 15–12	11,000	
November 11	**Georgia**	**Florida**	Fairfield Stadium • Jacksonville, FL (rivalry)	**UGA** 6–2	20,000	
November 11	**Sewanee**	**Vanderbilt**	Dudley Field • Nashville, TN (rivalry)	**VAN** 25–7	7,000	
^{#}Rankings from AP Poll released prior to game.

=== Week Eight ===
Date	Visiting team	Home team	Site	Result	Attendance	Ref.
November 18	No. 6 **Tulane**	Columbia	Baker Field • New York, NY	**W** 25–0	25,000	
November 18	Millsaps	**Mississippi State**	Scott Field • Starkville, MS	**W** 40–0	5,000	
November 18	West Tennessee State	**Ole Miss**	Hemingway Stadium • Oxford, MS (rivalry)	**W** 46–7	4,000	
November 18	West Virginia	**Kentucky**	McLean Stadium • Lexington, KY	**W** 13–6	8,000	
November 18	South Carolina	**Georgia**	Sanford Stadium • Athens, GA (rivalry)	**W** 33–7	7,000	
November 18	**Florida**	Miami (FL)	Burdine Stadium • Miami, FL (rivalry)	**W** 13–0	26,000–28,000	
November 18	**Sewanee**	The Citadel	Johnson Hagood Stadium • Charleston, SC	**W** 14–7		
November 18	**Vanderbilt**	No. 1 **Tennessee**	Shields–Watkins Field • Knoxville, TN (rivalry)	**TEN** 13–0	25,000	
November 18	**Georgia Tech**	**Alabama**	Legion Field • Birmingham, AL (rivalry)	**GT** 6–0	23,000	
November 18	**Auburn**	**LSU**	Tiger Stadium • Baton Rouge, LA (rivalry)	**AUB** 21–7		
^{#}Rankings from AP Poll released prior to game.

=== Week Eight ===
Date	Visiting team	Home team	Site	Result	Attendance	Ref.
November 25	No. 19 **Georgia Tech**	**Florida**	Florida Field • Gainesville, FL	**GT** 21–7	15,000	
November 25	**Sewanee**	No. 5 **Tulane**	Tulane Stadium • New Orleans, LA	**TUL** 52–0	15,000	
November 25	**Mississippi State**	**Ole Miss**	Hemingway Stadium • Oxford, MS (rivalry)	**MSS** 18–6	20,000	
November 25	**Auburn**	**Georgia**	Memorial Stadium • Columbus, GA (rivalry)	**AUB** 7–0	17,500	
^{#}Rankings from AP Poll released prior to game.

=== Week Nine ===
Date	Visiting team	Home team	Site	Result	Attendance	Ref.
November 30	No. 4 **Tennessee**	**Kentucky**	McLean Stadium • Lexington, KY	**TEN** 19–0	19,000	
November 30	**Alabama**	**Vanderbilt**	Dudley Field • Nashville, TN	**ALA** 39–0	18,000	
November 30	**Florida**	**Auburn**	Auburn Stadium • Auburn, AL (rivalry)	**T** 7–7	13,000	
December 2	**Georgia**	**Georgia Tech**	Grant Field • Atlanta, GA (rivalry)	**GT** 13–0	30,000	
December 2	**LSU**	**Tulane**	Tulane Stadium • New Orleans, LA (rivalry)	**TUL** 33–20	45,000	
^{#}Rankings from AP Poll released prior to game.

=== Week Ten ===
Date	Visiting team	Home team	Site	Result	Attendance	Ref.
December 8	**Georgia**	Miami (FL)	Burdine Stadium • Miami, FL	**W** 13–0	16,402	
December 9	**Auburn**	No. 2 **Tennessee**	Shields–Watkins Field • Knoxville, TN (rivalry)	**TEN** 7–0	25,000	
^{#}Rankings from AP Poll released prior to game.

=== Postseason ===
Date	Visiting team	Home team	Site	Result	Attendance	Ref.
January 1, 1940	No. 6 Missouri	No. 16 **Georgia Tech**	Burdine Stadium • Miami, FL (Orange Bowl)	**W** 21–7	35,000	
January 1, 1940	No. 3 USC	No. 2 **Tennessee**	Rose Bowl • Pasadena, CA (Rose Bowl)	**L** 0–14	92,200	
January 1, 1940	No. 5 **Tulane**	No. 1 Texas A&M	Tulane Stadium • New Orleans, LA (Sugar Bowl)	**L** 13–14	73,000	
^{#}Rankings from AP Poll released prior to game.

== All-conference players ==
The following players were recognized as consensus first-team honors from the Associated Press (AP) and United Press (UP) on the 1939 All-SEC football team:

- Ken Kavanaugh, End, LSU (AP-1, UP-1)
- Bob Ison, End, Georgia Tech (AP-1, UP-1)
- Harley McCollum, Tackle, Tulane (AP-1, UP-1)
- George Cafego, Quarterback, Tennessee (AP-1, UP-1)
- Bob "Jitterbug" Kellogg, Halfback, Tulane (AP-1, UP-1)

== All-Americans ==
Four SEC players were consensus first-team picks on the 1939 College Football All-America Team:

- Ken Kavanaugh, End, LSU (INS, LIB, NW, SN, UP)
- Ed Molinski, Guard, Tennessee (AAB, AP, CO, LIB, NEA)
- George Cafego, Quarterback, Tennessee (INS, NW, SN, UP)
- Harley McCollum, Tackle, Tulane (AP, LIB, NEA)

Other SEC players receiving All-American honors from at least one selector were:

- Ralph Wenzel, End, Tulane (UP-3; CP-1; CW-2; LIFE-2; NYS-1)
- Bob Ison, End, Georgia Tech (CP-3; NEA-3; NYS-2)
- Hal Newman, End, Alabama (NEA-2)
- Bob Suffridge, Guard, Tennessee (INS-1; NEA-3; NW-1; SN; UP-1; BL; CP-1; CW-1; LIFE-1; NYS-1)
- Tommy O'Boyle, Guard, Tulane (NEA-2)
- Cary Cox, Center, Alabama (CP-2; LIB)

== Head coaches ==
Records through the completion of the 1939 season

Team	Head coach	Years at school	Overall record	Record at school	SEC record
Alabama	Frank Thomas	9	95–20–6 (.810)	69–11–5 (.841)	33–6–4 (.814)
Auburn	Jack Meagher	6	58–50–2 (.536)	32–24–7 (.563)	20–16–5 (.549)
Florida	Josh Cody	4	56–54–3 (.509)	17–24–2 (.419)	6–14–2 (.318)
Georgia	Wally Butts	1	5–6–0 (.455)	5–6–0 (.455)	1–3–0 (.250)
Georgia Tech	William Alexander	20	103–74–15 (.576)	103–74–15 (.576)	19–21–5 (.478)
Kentucky	Albert D. Kirwan	2	8–9–1 (.472)	8–9–1 (.472)	2–6–1 (.278)
LSU	Bernie Moore	5	49–26–4 (.646)	37–14–1 (.721)	19–10–0 (.655)
Mississippi State	Allyn McKeen	1	21–8–0 (.724)	8–2–0 (.800)	3–2–0 (.600)
Ole Miss	Harry Mehre	2	75–38–6 (.655)	16–4–0 (.800)	17–16–2 (.514)
Sewanee	Harry E. Clark	9	21–56–3 (.281)	21–56–3 (.281)	0–36–0 (.000)
Tennessee	Robert Neyland	13	109–15–8 (.856)	109–15–8 (.856)	30–7–2 (.795)
Tulane	Red Dawson	4	26–10–4 (.700)	26–10–4 (.700)	13–7–3 (.630)
Vanderbilt	Ray Morrison	6	113–66–24 (.616)	29–22–2 (.566)	15–15–1 (.500)

== 1940 NFL draft ==
The following SEC players were selected in the 1940 NFL draft:

Round	Overall pick	Player name	School	Position	NFL team
1	1	George Cafego	Tennessee	Fullback	Chicago Cardinals
2	12	Ralph Wenzell	Tulane	End	Pittsburgh Steelers
3	22	Ken Kavanaugh	LSU	End	Chicago Bears
3	23	Buddy Banker	Tulane	Back	Washington Redskins
4	30	Bobby Wood	Alabama	Tackle	Cleveland Rams
5	33	Clark Goff	Florida	Tackle	Pittsburgh Steelers
5	34	Walt Merrill	Alabama	Tackle	Brooklyn Dodgers
5	38	Bill Kirchem	Tulane	Tackle	Washington Redskins
6	46	Jim Rike	Tennessee	Center	Detroit Lions
7	59	Millard White	Tulane	Tackle	Green Bay Packers
8	67	Jim Fordham	Georgia	Back	Chicago Bears
11	93	Cary Cox	Alabama	Center	Pittsburgh Steelers
11	95	Boyd Clay	Tennessee	Tackle	Cleveland Rams
12	105	Shag Goolsby	Mississippi State	Center	Cleveland Rams
12	107	Bill McCubbin	Kentucky	End	Chicago Bears
13	118	Sam Bartholomew	Tennessee	Back	Washington Redskins
14	124	Len Coffman	Tennessee	Back	Brooklyn Dodgers
15	138	Sandy Sanford	Alabama	End	Washington Redskins
16	149	Ray Andrus	Vanderbilt	Back	Green Bay Packers
17	155	Jack Nix	Mississippi State	Back	Cleveland Rams
19	172	Bill Schneller	Ole Miss	Back	Philadelphia Eagles
20	184	Milt Howell	Auburn	Offensive guard	Brooklyn Dodgers
20	185	Luke Lindon	Kentucky	Tackle	Cleveland Rams
20	187	Young Bussey	LSU	Back	Chicago Bears
20	188	F. W. "Buck" Murphy	Georgia Tech	Back	Washington Redskins
21	191	Malvern Morgan	Auburn	Center	Detroit Lions
