= 1939–40 NCAA football bowl games =

College football postseason game series

- Season: 1939
- Number of bowls: 5
- All-star games: Blue–Gray Football Classic; East–West Shrine Game
- Bowl games: January 1, 1940
- Champions: Texas A&M Aggies (AP, Dunkel); USC Trojans (Dickinson)
Bowl record by conference
| Conference | Bowls | Record | Number of teams in final AP poll |
| SEC | 3 | 1–2 (0.333) | 3 |
| Independents | 2 | 0–1–1 (0.250) | 6 |
| PCC | 1 | 1–0 (1.000) | 2 |
| Southern | 1 | 1–0 (1.000) | 2 |
| SWC | 1 | 1–0 (1.000) | 1 |
| Border | 1 | 0–0–1 (0.500) | 0 |
| Big Six | 1 | 0–1 (0.000) | 3 |
| Big Ten | 0 | 0–0 (–) | 3 |

The 1939–40 NCAA football bowl games were the final games of the National Collegiate Athletic Association (NCAA) 1939 college football season and featured five bowl games, each of which had been held the previous season. All five bowls were played on January 1, 1940. The national championship, according to recognized selectors, was split by Texas A&M and USC.

== Poll rankings ==
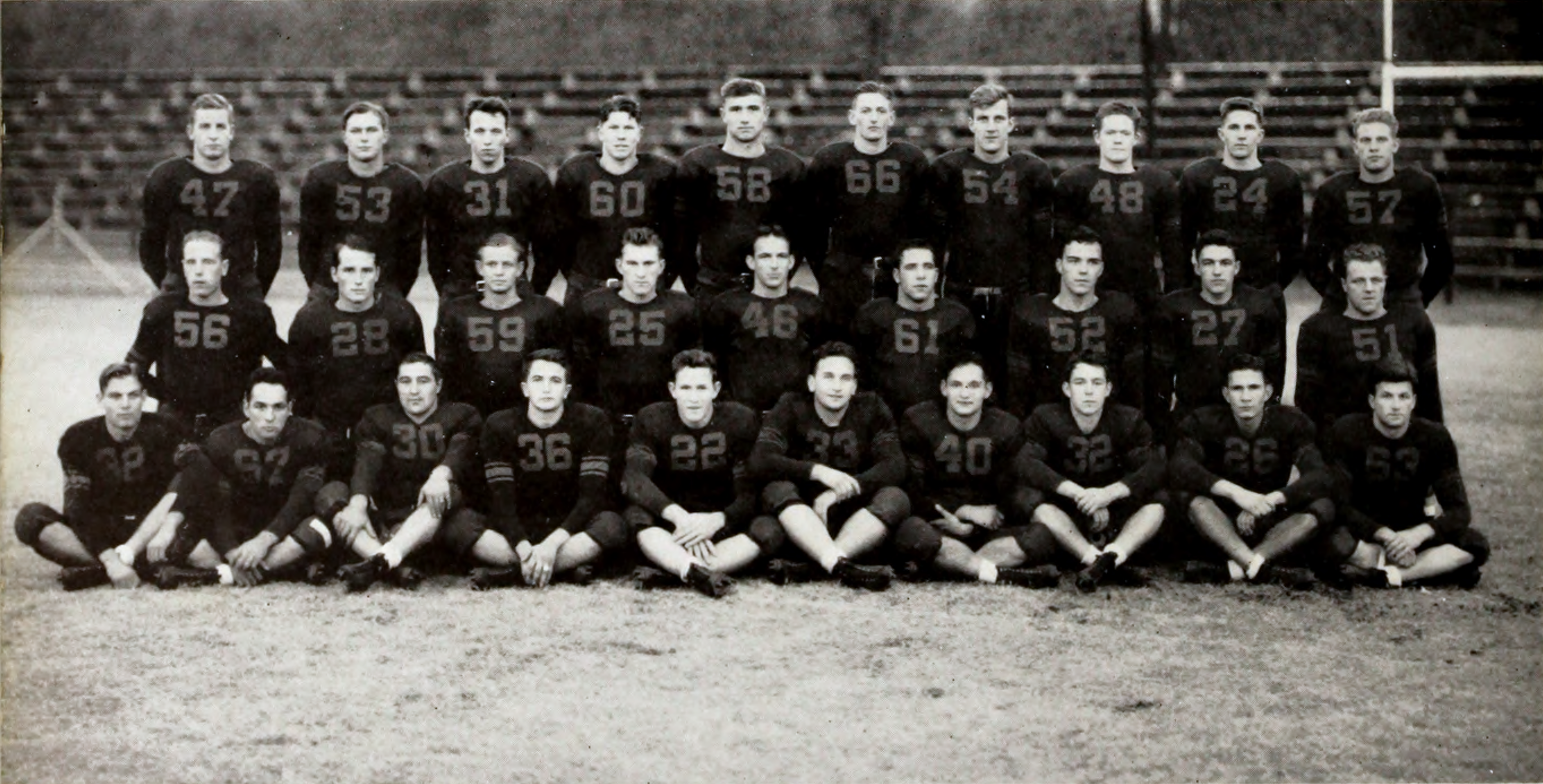
The 1939 Clemson Tigers played in the 1940 Cotton Bowl Classic.

The below table lists top teams (per the AP poll taken after the completion of the regular season), their win–loss records (prior to bowl games), and the bowls they later played in.

| AP | Team | W–L | Conf. | Bowl |
|---|---|---|---|---|
| 1 | Texas A&M Aggies | 10–0 | SWC | Sugar Bowl |
| 2 | Tennessee Volunteers | 10–0 | SEC | Rose Bowl |
| 3 | USC Trojans | 7–0–2 | PCC | Rose Bowl |
| 4 | Cornell Big Red | 8–0 | Ind. | — |
| 5 | Tulane Green Wave | 8–0–1 | SEC | Sugar Bowl |
| 6 | Missouri Tigers | 8–1 | Big Six | Orange Bowl |
| 7 | UCLA Bruins | 6–0–4 | PCC | — |
| 8 | Duke Blue Devils | 8–1 | Southern | — |
| 9 | Iowa Hawkeyes | 6–1–1 | Big Ten | — † |
| 10 | Duquesne Dukes | 8–0–1 | Ind. | — |
| 11 | Boston College Eagles | 9–1 | Ind. | Cotton Bowl Classic |
| 12 | Clemson Tigers | 8–1 | Southern | Cotton Bowl Classic |
| 13 | Notre Dame Fighting Irish | 7–2 | Ind. | — |
| 14 | Santa Clara Broncos | 5–1–3 | Ind. | — |
| 15 | Ohio State Buckeyes | 6–2 | Big Ten | — † |
| 16 | Georgia Tech Yellow Jackets | 8–2 | SEC | Orange Bowl |
| 17 | Fordham Rams | 6–2 | Ind. | — |
| 18 | Nebraska Cornhuskers | 7–1–1 | Big Six | — |
| 19 | Oklahoma Sooners | 6–2–1 | Big Six | — |
| 20 | Michigan Wolverines | 6–2 | Big Ten | — † |

† The Big Ten Conference did not allow its members to participate in bowl games until the 1947 Rose Bowl.

== Bowl schedule ==
| Date | Game | Site | Teams | Affiliations | Results |
|---|---|---|---|---|---|
| Jan. 1 | Rose Bowl | Rose Bowl; Pasadena, California | #3 USC Trojans (7–0–2) #2 Tennessee Volunteers (10–0) | PCC; SEC | USC 14; Tennessee 0 |
| Jan. 1 | Sugar Bowl | Tulane Stadium; New Orleans, Louisiana | #1 Texas A&M Aggies (10–0) #5 Tulane Green Wave (8–0–1) | SWC; SEC | Texas A&M 14; Tulane 13 |
| Jan. 1 | Orange Bowl | Burdine Stadium; Miami, Florida | #16 Georgia Tech Yellow Jackets (7–2) #6 Missouri Tigers (8–1) | SEC; Big Six | Georgia Tech 21; Missouri 7 |
| Jan. 1 | Sun Bowl | Kidd Field; El Paso, Texas | Catholic University (8–1); Arizona State Bulldogs (8–2) | Independent; Border | Catholic 0 Arizona State 0 |
| Jan. 1 | Cotton Bowl Classic | Cotton Bowl; Dallas, Texas | #12 Clemson Tigers (8–1) #11 Boston College Eagles (9–1) | Southern; Independent | Clemson 6 Boston College 3 |

=== Conference performance in bowl games ===
| Conference | Games | Record | | | | Bowls | | |
| Conference | Games | W | L | T | Pct. | Won | Lost | Tied |
|---|---|---|---|---|---|---|---|---|
| SEC | 3 | 1 | 2 | 0 | .333 | Orange | Rose, Sugar | — |
| Independents | 2 | 0 | 1 | 1 | .250 | — | Cotton | Sun |
| Pacific Coast | 1 | 1 | 0 | 0 | 1.000 | Rose | — | — |
| Southern | 1 | 1 | 0 | 0 | 1.000 | Cotton | — | — |
| SWC | 1 | 1 | 0 | 0 | 1.000 | Sugar | — | — |
| Border | 1 | 0 | 0 | 1 | .500 | — | — | Sun |
| Big Six | 1 | 0 | 1 | 0 | .000 | — | Orange | — |

== Game recaps ==
=== Rose Bowl ===
| | 1 | 2 | 3 | 4 | Total |
|---|---|---|---|---|---|
| #3 USC | 0 | 7 | 0 | 7 | 14 |
| #2 Tennessee | 0 | 0 | 0 | 0 | 0 |

| Qtr. | Team | Scoring play | Score |
|---|---|---|---|
| 2 | USC | Schindler 1 yard rush, Jones kick good | USC 7–0 |
| 4 | USC | Krueger 1 yard pass from Schindler, Gaspar kick good | USC 14–0 |

=== Sugar Bowl ===
| | 1 | 2 | 3 | 4 | Total |
|---|---|---|---|---|---|
| #1 Texas A&M | 7 | 0 | 0 | 7 | 14 |
| #5 Tulane | 0 | 0 | 7 | 6 | 13 |

| Qtr. | Team | Scoring play | Score |
|---|---|---|---|
| 1 | A&M | Kimbrough 1 yard rush, Price kick good | A&M 7–0 |
| 3 | TUL | Kellogg 75 yard punt return, Thibaut kick good | TIED 7–7 |
| 4 | TUL | Baker 2 yard rush, kick failed | TUL 13–7 |
| 4 | A&M | Kimbrough 18 yard pass from Smith, Price kick good | A&M 14–13 |

=== Orange Bowl ===
| | 1 | 2 | 3 | 4 | Total |
|---|---|---|---|---|---|
| #6 Missouri | 7 | 0 | 0 | 0 | 7 |
| #16 Georgia Tech | 7 | 7 | 7 | 0 | 21 |

| Qtr. | Team | Scoring play | Score |
|---|---|---|---|
| 1 | MO | Christman 1 yard rush, Cunningham kick good | MO 7–0 |
| 1 | GT | Ector 1 yard rush, Goree kick good | TIED 7–7 |
| 2 | GT | Ison 31 yard rush, Goree kick good | GT 14–7 |
| 3 | GT | Wheby 59 yard rush, Goree kick good | GT 21–7 |

=== Cotton Bowl Classic ===
| | 1 | 2 | 3 | 4 | Total |
|---|---|---|---|---|---|
| #12 Clemson | 0 | 6 | 0 | 0 | 6 |
| #11 Boston College | 0 | 3 | 0 | 0 | 3 |

| Qtr. | Team | Scoring play | Score |
|---|---|---|---|
| 2 | BC | Lukachik 36 yard FG | BC 3–0 |
| 2 | CLEM | Timmons 1 yard rush, kick failed | CLEM 6–3 |

=== Sun Bowl ===
| | 1 | 2 | 3 | 4 | Total |
|---|---|---|---|---|---|
| Catholic | 0 | 0 | 0 | 0 | 0 |
| Arizona State | 0 | 0 | 0 | 0 | 0 |

| Qtr. | Team | Scoring play | Score |
|---|---|---|---|
No scoring

== See also ==
- Prairie View Bowl
