= 1939 Alabama Crimson Tide football team =

American college football season

1939 Alabama Crimson Tide football
- Conference: Southeastern Conference
- Record: 5–3–1 (2–3–1 SEC)
- Head coach: Frank Thomas (9th season)
- Captain: Carey Cox
- Home stadium: Denny Stadium; Legion Field

1939 Southeastern Conference football standings
	Conf.					Overall
Team		W		L			W		L
No. 2 Tennessee +	6	–	0	–	0	10	–	1	–	0
No. 16 Georgia Tech +	6	–	0	–	0	8	–	2	–	0
No. 5 Tulane +	5	–	0	–	0	8	–	1	–	1
Mississippi State	3	–	2	–	0	8	–	2	–	0
Ole Miss	2	–	2	–	0	7	–	2	–	0
Kentucky	2	–	2	–	1	6	–	2	–	1
Auburn	3	–	3	–	1	5	–	5	–	1
Alabama	2	–	3	–	1	5	–	3	–	1
Georgia	1	–	3	–	0	5	–	6	–	0
LSU	1	–	5	–	0	4	–	5	–	0
Vanderbilt	1	–	6	–	0	2	–	7	–	1
Florida	0	–	3	–	1	5	–	5	–	1
Sewanee	0	–	3	–	0	3	–	5	–	0
+ – Conference co-champions; Rankings from AP Poll

The 1939 Alabama Crimson Tide football team (variously "Alabama", "UA" or "Bama") represented the University of Alabama in the 1939 college football season. It was the Crimson Tide's 46th overall and 7th season as a member of the Southeastern Conference (SEC). The team was led by head coach Frank Thomas, in his ninth year, and played their home games at Denny Stadium in Tuscaloosa and Legion Field in Birmingham, Alabama. They finished the season with a record of five wins, three losses and one tie (5–3–1 overall, 2–3–1 in the SEC).

The Crimson Tide opened the season with a victory over the Howard Bulldogs before they beat Fordham, 7–6, in an intersectional contest at the Polo Grounds in week two. After their victory over Mercer, Alabama was shut out 21–0 by Tennessee, their second consecutive shutout loss against the Volunteers. The Crimson Tide then rebounded with a homecoming victory over Mississippi State. Alabama then went winless over their next three conference games with a tie against Kentucky followed by shutout losses to both Tulane and Georgia Tech. The Crimson Tide rebounded in their final game of the season to defeat Vanderbilt.

Alabama was not ranked in the final AP poll, but it was ranked at No. 17 in the 1939 Williamson System ratings, and at No. 22 in the final Litkenhous Ratings for 1939.

== Schedule ==
Date	Opponent	Rank	Site	Result	Attendance	Source
September 30	Howard (AL)*		Denny Stadium; Tuscaloosa, AL	W 21–0	6,000	
October 7	at Fordham*		Polo Grounds; New York, NY	W 7–6	41,454	
October 14	Mercer*		Denny Stadium; Tuscaloosa, AL	W 20–0	5,000	
October 21	at No. 5 Tennessee	No. 8	Shields–Watkins Field; Knoxville, TN (Third Saturday in October)	L 0–21	40,000	
October 28	Mississippi State^{†}	No. 20	Denny Stadium; Tuscaloosa, AL (rivalry)	W 7–0	15,000	
November 4	No. 15 Kentucky	No. 19	Legion Field; Birmingham, AL	T 7–7	11,000	
November 11	at No. 7 Tulane	No. 20	Tulane Stadium; New Orleans, LA	L 0–13	52,000	
November 18	Georgia Tech		Legion Field; Birmingham, AL (rivalry)	L 0–6	23,000	
November 30	at Vanderbilt		Dudley Field; Nashville, TN	W 39–0	18,000	
*Non-conference game; ^{†}Homecoming; Rankings from AP Poll released prior to the game

== Rankings ==
Ranking movements Legend: ██ Increase in ranking ██ Decrease in ranking — = Not ranked т = Tied with team above or below ( ) = First-place votes
	Week								
Poll	1	2	3	4	5	6	7	8	Final
AP	8 (2.5)	20	19т	20	—	—	—	—	—

== Game summaries ==
=== Howard (AL) ===
Team	1	2	3	4	Total
Howard	0	0	0	0	0
• Alabama	0	0	7	14	21

- Date: September 30
- Location: Denny Stadium
  Tuscaloosa, AL
- Game attendance: 6,000

To open the 1939 season, Alabama defeated Howard (now Samford University) 21–0 at Denny Stadium. After a scoreless first half, the Crimson Tide scored their first touchdown on a one-yard Paul Spencer run in the third quarter. Alabama then closed the game with a pair of fourth-quarter touchdowns for the 21–0 win. The first came on a five-yard Herschel Mosley pass to Holt Rast and the second on a second, one-yard run by Spencer.

=== Fordham ===
Team	1	2	3	4	Total
• Alabama	7	0	0	0	7
Fordham	0	0	0	6	6

- Date: October 7
- Location: Polo Grounds
  New York, NY
- Game attendance: 41,454

On the road against a favored Fordham squad, the Crimson Tide defeated the Rams 7–6 at the Polo Grounds in an intersectional matchup. The Crimson Tide scored their only points of the game in the first quarter. Jimmy Nelson scored Alabama's only touchdown on an 18-yard run to cap a 40-yard drive, and then Hayward Sanford connected on the extra point to give the Crimson Tide a 7–0 lead. Sanford later missed a 33-yard field goal in the first, and the Rams turned the ball over on downs at the Alabama 19-yard line to keep the score 7–0 at the end of the quarter. Fordham then scored their only points of the game late in the fourth after Dom Principe scored on a short touchdown run; however, Alex Yudikaitis missed the extra point which proved to be the margin in their loss.

This game is noted as being the second televised college football game after the 1939 Waynesburg vs. Fordham football game played one week earlier. The game was televised exclusively in New York City as it was broadcast over W2XBS and only a few hundred televisions were thought to be in existence at the time.

=== Mercer ===
Team	1	2	3	4	Total
Mercer	0	0	0	0	0
• Alabama	7	0	13	0	20

- Date: October 14
- Location: Denny Stadium
  Tuscaloosa, AL
- Game attendance: 5,000

A week after the road win at Fordham, Alabama defeated the Mercer Bears 20–0 at Denny Stadium in the first all-time meeting between the schools. The Crimson Tide took a 7–0 first quarter lead after Paul Spencer scored on a one-yard touchdown run to cap a 42-yard drive. After a scoreless second quarter, Alabama scored a pair of third-quarter touchdowns for the 20–0 victory. Gene Blackwell scored first on an eight-yard run and Herschel Mosley scored on a four-yard run.

=== Tennessee ===
Third Saturday in October

Team	1	2	3	4	Total
#8 Alabama	0	0	0	0	0
• #5 Tennessee	0	7	0	14	21

- Date: October 21
- Location: Shields-Watkins Field
  Knoxville, TN
- Game attendance: 40,000

On the Monday prior to their annual game against the Volunteers, Alabama was selected to the No. 8 and Tennessee was selected to the No. 5 position in the first AP Poll of the 1939 season. In the game, Alabama was shut out by rival Tennessee 21–0 before an overflow crowd of 40,000 at Shields-Watkins Field. After a scoreless first quarter, Tennessee took a 7–0 lead in the second after Johnny Butler scored on a 56-yard run. Up by a touchdown at the end of the third, a pair of fourth-quarter touchdown runs gave the Volunteers the 21–0 win. The first was made by Bob Foxx on an 11-yard run and the second by Buss Warren on a 12-yard run.

Although Alabama was shut out and lost by three touchdowns, Tennessee head coach Robert Neyland said of the Crimson Tide's performance that "I don't think the score indicates the difference between the teams. It should have been about 7 to 0."

=== Mississippi State ===
Team	1	2	3	4	Total
Mississippi State	0	0	0	0	0
• #20 Alabama	7	0	0	0	7

- Date: October 28
- Location: Denny Stadium
  Tuscaloosa, AL
- Game attendance: 15,000

After their loss to Tennessee, Alabama dropped from No. 8 to No. 20 in the AP Poll as they entered their annual homecoming game. Against Mississippi State the Crimson Tide defeated the Maroons 7–0 before 15,000 fans at Denny Stadium. The only points of the game came in the first quarter when Charley Boswell threw a four-yard touchdown pass to Holt Rast. Alabama outgained the Maroons in rushing yardage 173 to 65 in the victory.

=== Kentucky ===
Team	1	2	3	4	Total
#15 Kentucky	0	0	0	7	7
#19 Alabama	0	7	0	0	7

- Date: November 4
- Location: Legion Field
  Birmingham, AL
- Game attendance: 11,000

As Alabama entered their contest against Kentucky, they gained one position the rankings to No. 19 and the Wildcats entered the rankings at No. 15 in the weekly AP Poll. In the game, the Crimson Tide battled the Wildcats to a 7–7 tie in the first game played at Legion Field of the season. After a scoreless first, Holt Rast blocked a Kentucky punt that was recovered by Alabama at the Wildcats' two-yard line. Two plays later, Paul Spencer scored on a short run and Bud Waites converted the extra point to give the Crimson Tide a 7–0 lead. Still down by a touchdown at the end of the third, Kentucky tied the game in the fourth on a short Noah Mullins run and Jim Hardin extra point.

=== Tulane ===
Team	1	2	3	4	Total
#20 Alabama	0	0	0	0	0
• #7 Tulane	0	6	7	0	13

- Date: November 11
- Location: Tulane Stadium
  New Orleans, LA
- Game attendance: 52,000

After their tie with Kentucky, the Crimson Tide dropped out of the weekly AP Poll, and Tulane took the No. 7 position after their victory over Ole Miss. In New Orleans, the Crimson Tide was shutout by the Green Wave 13–0 before a crowd of 52,000 at Tulane Stadium. After a scoreless first, Tulane took a 6–0 halftime lead when Harry Hays scored a touchdown on a 69-yard reverse. Robert Kellogg then scored the Green Wave's other touchdown in the third with his three-yard run.

=== Georgia Tech ===
Team	1	2	3	4	Total
• Georgia Tech	6	0	0	0	6
Alabama	0	0	0	0	0

- Date: November 18
- Location: Legion Field
  Birmingham, AL
- Game attendance: 23,000

In their final home game of the season game against Georgia Tech Alabama lost their second consecutive game by a shutout, 6–0 against the Yellow Jackets at Legion Field. The only score of the game was set up after R. W. Murphy recovered a John Hanson fumble at the Alabama 38-yard line. Three plays later the Yellow Jackets scored on a 24-yard E. M. Wheby touchdown reception from Johnny Bosch, and after Holt Rast blocked the extra point attempt, Georgia Tech led 6–0.

=== Vanderbilt ===
Team	1	2	3	4	Total
• Alabama	13	6	7	13	39
Vanderbilt	0	0	0	0	0

- Date: November 30
- Location: Dudley Field
  Nashville, TN

In their season finale against the Vanderbilt Commodores, Alabama won 39–0 at Dudley Field on Thanksgiving Day to end a two-game losing streak. In the first half touchdowns were scored on a Jimmy Nelson touchdown reception in the first and by a 77-yard Herschel Mosley run and a 67-yard Paul Spencer run in the second. Up by three touchdowns at halftime, the Crimson Tide scored three second half touchdowns in the 39–0 victory. Second half touchdowns were scored on a 20-yard Jimmy Nelson reception and by Spencer on an eight-yard run and by Hal Newman on an 18-yard reception from Billy Harrell as time expired.

== After the season ==
=== NFL draft ===
Several players that were varsity lettermen from the 1939 squad were drafted into the National Football League (NFL) between the 1940 and 1942 drafts. These players included the following:

Year	Round	Overall	Player name	Position	NFL team
1940	4	30	Bobby Wood	Tackle	Cleveland Rams
1940	5	34	Walt Merrill	Tackle	Brooklyn Dodgers
1940	11	93	Cary Cox	Center	Pittsburgh Steelers
1940	11	138	Hayward Sanford	End	Washington Redskins
1941	3	25	Fred Davis	Tackle	Washington Redskins
1941	7	58	Hal Newman	End	Brooklyn Dodgers
1941	10	90	Ed Hickerson	Guard	Washington Redskins
1942	14	123	John Wyhonic	Guard	Philadelphia Eagles
1942	18	170	Holt Rast	End	Chicago Bears
1942	19	174	Jimmy Nelson	Back	Chicago Cardinals

== Personnel ==
=== Varsity letter winners ===
Player	Hometown	Position
Warren Averitte	Greenville, Mississippi	Center
Gene Blackwell	Blytheville, Arkansas	End
Tom Borders	Birmingham, Alabama	Tackle
Charley Boswell	Birmingham, Alabama	Halfback
Carey Cox	Bainbridge, Georgia	Center
Fred Davis	Louisville, Kentucky	Tackle
John Hanson	Roanoke, Alabama	Fullback
Walter Merrill	Andalusia, Alabama	Tackle
Herschel Mosley	Blytheville, Arkansas	Halfback
Jimmy Nelson	Live Oak, Florida	Halfback
Hal Newman	Birmingham, Alabama	End
Holt Rast	Birmingham, Alabama	End
Perron Shoemaker	Birmingham, Alabama	End
Paul Spencer	Hampton, Virginia	Fullback
Joseph Sugg	Russellville, Alabama	Guard
W. L. Waites	Tuscaloosa, Alabama	Halfback
Erin Warren	Montgomery, Alabama	End
Dallas Wicke	Pensacola, Florida	Quarterback
John Wyhonic	Connorville, Ohio	Guard

=== Coaching staff ===
Name	Position	Seasons at Alabama	Alma mater
Frank Thomas	Head coach	9	Notre Dame (1923)
Bear Bryant	Assistant coach	4	Alabama (1935)
Paul Burnum	Assistant coach	10	Alabama (1922)
Tilden Campbell	Assistant coach	4	Alabama (1935)
Hank Crisp	Assistant coach	19	VPI (1920)
Harold Drew	Assistant coach	9	Bates (1916)
Joe Kilgrow	Assistant coach	2	Alabama (1937)
