= 1939 Tulane Green Wave football team =

American college football season

1939 Tulane Green Wave football

SEC co-champion

Sugar Bowl, L 13–14 vs. Texas A&M
- Conference: Southeastern Conference

Ranking
- AP: No. 5
- Record: 8–1–1 (5–0 SEC)
- Head coach: Red Dawson (4th season)
- Captain: Paul Krueger
- Home stadium: Tulane Stadium

1939 Southeastern Conference football standings
	Conf.					Overall
Team		W		L			W		L
No. 2 Tennessee +	6	–	0	–	0	10	–	1	–	0
No. 16 Georgia Tech +	6	–	0	–	0	8	–	2	–	0
No. 5 Tulane +	5	–	0	–	0	8	–	1	–	1
Mississippi State	3	–	2	–	0	8	–	2	–	0
Ole Miss	2	–	2	–	0	7	–	2	–	0
Kentucky	2	–	2	–	1	6	–	2	–	1
Auburn	3	–	3	–	1	5	–	5	–	1
Alabama	2	–	3	–	1	5	–	3	–	1
Georgia	1	–	3	–	0	5	–	6	–	0
LSU	1	–	5	–	0	4	–	5	–	0
Vanderbilt	1	–	6	–	0	2	–	7	–	1
Florida	0	–	3	–	1	5	–	5	–	1
Sewanee	0	–	3	–	0	3	–	5	–	0
+ – Conference co-champions; Rankings from AP Poll

The 1939 Tulane Green Wave football team was an American football team that represented Tulane University as a member of the Southeastern Conference (SEC) during the 1939 college football season. In its fourth year under head coach Red Dawson, Tulane compiled an 8–0–1 record in the regular season (5–0 in conference games), shut out five opponents, and outscored all opponents by a total of 211 to 53. They finished the season in a three-way tie with Tennessee and Georgia Tech for the SEC championship. Ranked No. 5 in the final AP poll, the Green Wave was invited to the Sugar Bowl, losing, 14–13, on a blocked extra point to No. 1 Texas A&M.

Tackle Harley McCollum was a consensus All-American. Halfback Bob "Jitterbug" Kellogg received first-team honors from both the Associated Press (AP) and United Press (UP) on the 1939 All-SEC football team. End Ralph Wenzel received second-team All-SEC honors from the AP and UP.

The Green Wave played its home games at Tulane Stadium in New Orleans.

== Schedule ==
Date	Opponent	Rank	Site	Result	Attendance	Source
September 30	Clemson*		Tulane Stadium; New Orleans, LA	W 7–6	25,000	
October 7	Auburn		Tulane Stadium; New Orleans, LA (rivalry)	W 12–0	28,000	
October 14	Fordham*		Tulane Stadium; New Orleans, LA	W 7–0	43,000	
October 21	No. 14 North Carolina*	No. 4	Tulane Stadium; New Orleans, LA	T 14–14	34,000	
October 28	No. 14 Ole Miss	No. 9	Tulane Stadium; New Orleans, LA (rivalry)	W 18–6	37,000	
November 11	No. 20 Alabama	No. 7	Tulane Stadium; New Orleans, LA	W 13–0	52,000	
November 18	at Columbia*	No. 6	Baker Field; New York, NY	W 25–0	25,000	
November 25	Sewanee	No. 5	Tulane Stadium; New Orleans, LA	W 52–0	15,000	
December 2	LSU	No. 5	Tulane Stadium; New Orleans, LA (Battle for the Rag)	W 33–20	45,000	
January 1, 1940	vs. No. 1 Texas A&M*	No. 5	Tulane Stadium; New Orleans, LA (Sugar Bowl)	L 13–14	73,000	
*Non-conference game; Rankings from AP Poll released prior to the game

== Rankings ==
Ranking movements Legend: ██ Increase in ranking ██ Decrease in ranking ( ) = First-place votes
	Week								
Poll	1	2	3	4	5	6	7	8	Final
AP	4 (14)	9 (1)	8 (1)	7	6 (2)	5 (3)	5 (4)	5 (5)	5
