= Jim Fordham =

American football player (1916–1969)

- Jim Fordham, 1939

No. 3
- Position: Fullback

Personal information
- Born: December 6, 1916; Candler County, Georgia, U.S.
- Died: April 5, 1969 (aged 52); Monterrey, Mexico
- Listed height: 5 ft 11 in (1.80 m)
- Listed weight: 215 lb (98 kg)

Career information
- High school: Swainsboro (Swainsboro, Georgia)
- College: Georgia
- NFL draft: 1940: 8th round, 67th overall pick

Career history
- Chicago Bears (1944–1945)

Career NFL statistics
- Rushing yards: 534
- Rushing average: 4.5
- Receptions: 5
- Receiving yards: 47
- Total touchdowns: 5
- Stats at Pro Football Reference

James Edward Fordham (December 6, 1916 – April 15, 1969) was an American professional football player.

Fordham was born in 1916 in Candler County, Georgia. He attended the University of Georgia where he played college football for the Georgia Bulldogs from 1937 to 1939. He played under three head coaches (Harry Mehre, Joel Hunt, and Wally Butts) in his three years at Georgia and started on the 1938 and 1939 Georgia teams that compiled records of 5–4–1 and 5–6. He was selected to play in the 1939 Blue–Gray Football Classic.

Fordham also played professional football in the National Football League (NFL) for the Chicago Bears from 1944 to 1945. He was drafted in the eighth round of the 1940 NFL draft. In 1944, he ranked among the NFL league leaders with 381 rushing yards (ninth), 5.2 rushing yards per attempt (fifth) and 38.1 rushing yards per game (tenth).

Fordham later lived in Venezuela where he worked for a tobacco company. He subsequently moved to Monterrey, Mexico, where he operated a cigarette factory. He died from a heart attack in Monterrey in April 1969 at age 52.
