= 1939 Ole Miss Rebels football team =

American college football season

1939 Ole Miss Rebels football
- Conference: Southeastern Conference
- Record: 7–2 (2–2 SEC)
- Head coach: Harry Mehre (2nd season)
- Captain: Bill Schneller
- Home stadium: Hemingway Stadium

1939 Southeastern Conference football standings
	Conf.					Overall
Team		W		L			W		L
No. 2 Tennessee +	6	–	0	–	0	10	–	1	–	0
No. 16 Georgia Tech +	6	–	0	–	0	8	–	2	–	0
No. 5 Tulane +	5	–	0	–	0	8	–	1	–	1
Mississippi State	3	–	2	–	0	8	–	2	–	0
Ole Miss	2	–	2	–	0	7	–	2	–	0
Kentucky	2	–	2	–	1	6	–	2	–	1
Auburn	3	–	3	–	1	5	–	5	–	1
Alabama	2	–	3	–	1	5	–	3	–	1
Georgia	1	–	3	–	0	5	–	6	–	0
LSU	1	–	5	–	0	4	–	5	–	0
Vanderbilt	1	–	6	–	0	2	–	7	–	1
Florida	0	–	3	–	1	5	–	5	–	1
Sewanee	0	–	3	–	0	3	–	5	–	0
+ – Conference co-champions; Rankings from AP Poll

The 1939 Ole Miss Rebels football team represented the University of Mississippi in the 1939 college football season. The Rebels were led by second-year head coach Harry Mehre and played their home games at Hemingway Stadium in Oxford, Mississippi. After winning their first three games of the season, Ole Miss made their first ever appearance in the AP Poll. Their victory over rival Vanderbilt was also their first ever; they had lost the first 19 match-ups in the series over a 45-year span. They would finish with a record of 7–2 (2–2 SEC), to finish fifth in the Southeastern Conference.

Ole Miss was not ranked in the final AP poll, but it was ranked at No. 35 in the 1939 Williamson System ratings, and at No. 17 in the Litkenhous Ratings.

== Schedule ==
Date	Opponent	Rank	Site	Result	Attendance	Source
September 30	at LSU		Tiger Stadium; Baton Rouge, LA (rivalry)	W 14–7		
October 7	at Southwestern (TN)*		Crump Stadium; Memphis, TN	W 41–0	12,000	
October 14	at Centenary*		Centenary College Stadium; Shreveport, LA	W 34–0	7,500	
October 21	Saint Louis*^{†}	No. 17	Hemingway Stadium; Oxford, MS	W 42–0		
October 28	at No. 9 Tulane	No. 14	Tulane Stadium; New Orleans, LA (rivalry)	L 6–18	37,000	
November 4	vs. Vanderbilt		Crump Stadium; Memphis, TN (rivalry)	W 14–7	12,000	
November 11	at Mississippi State Teachers*	No. 19	Faulkner Field; Hattiesburg, MS	W 27–7		
November 18	West Tennessee State*		Hemingway Stadium; Oxford, MS (rivalry)	W 46–7	4,000	
November 25	Mississippi State		Hemingway Stadium; Oxford, MS (Egg Bowl)	L 6–18	20,000	
*Non-conference game; ^{†}Homecoming; Rankings from AP Poll released prior to the game
