= 1939 Kentucky Wildcats football team =

American college football season

1939 Kentucky Wildcats football
- Conference: Southeastern Conference
- Record: 6–2–1 (2–2–1 SEC)
- Head coach: Albert D. Kirwan (2nd season)
- Captain: Joe Shepherd
- Home stadium: McLean Stadium

1939 Southeastern Conference football standings
	Conf.					Overall
Team		W		L			W		L
No. 2 Tennessee +	6	–	0	–	0	10	–	1	–	0
No. 16 Georgia Tech +	6	–	0	–	0	8	–	2	–	0
No. 5 Tulane +	5	–	0	–	0	8	–	1	–	1
Mississippi State	3	–	2	–	0	8	–	2	–	0
Ole Miss	2	–	2	–	0	7	–	2	–	0
Kentucky	2	–	2	–	1	6	–	2	–	1
Auburn	3	–	3	–	1	5	–	5	–	1
Alabama	2	–	3	–	1	5	–	3	–	1
Georgia	1	–	3	–	0	5	–	6	–	0
LSU	1	–	5	–	0	4	–	5	–	0
Vanderbilt	1	–	6	–	0	2	–	7	–	1
Florida	0	–	3	–	1	5	–	5	–	1
Sewanee	0	–	3	–	0	3	–	5	–	0
+ – Conference co-champions; Rankings from AP Poll

The 1939 Kentucky Wildcats football team was an American football team that represented the University of Kentucky as a member of the Southeastern Conference (SEC) during the 1939 college football season. In their second season under head coach Albert D. Kirwan, the Wildcats compiled an overall record of 6–2–1 with a mark of 2–2–1 against conference opponents, finished sixth in the SEC, and outscored opponents by a total of 161 to 64.

Kentucky was not ranked in the final AP poll, but it was ranked at No. 28 in the 1939 Williamson System ratings, and at No. 27 in the final Litkenhous Ratings for 1939.

The team played its home games at McLean Stadium in Lexington, Kentucky.

== Schedule ==
Date	Opponent	Rank	Site	Result	Attendance	Source
September 30	VMI*		McLean Stadium; Lexington, KY	W 21–0	5,000	
October 7	at Vanderbilt		Dudley Field; Nashville, TN (rivalry)	W 21–13	10,000	
October 14	Oglethorpe*		McLean Stadium; Lexington, KY	W 59–0		
October 21	Georgia		Du Pont Manual Stadium; Louisville, KY	W 13–6	14,000	
October 28	at Xavier*		Xavier Stadium; Cincinnati, OH	W 21–0	8,000	
November 4	at No. 19 Alabama	No. 15	Legion Field; Birmingham, AL	T 7–7	11,000	
November 11	at Georgia Tech	No. 18	Grant Field; Atlanta, GA	L 6–13	25,000	
November 18	West Virginia*		McLean Stadium; Lexington, KY	W 13–6	8,000	
November 30	No. 4 Tennessee		McLean Stadium; Lexington, KY (rivalry)	L 0–19	19,000	
*Non-conference game; Rankings from AP Poll released prior to the game
