= 1939 LSU Tigers football team =

American college football season

1939 LSU Tigers football
- Conference: Southeastern Conference
- Record: 4–5 (1–5 SEC)
- Head coach: Bernie Moore (5th season)
- Home stadium: Tiger Stadium

1939 Southeastern Conference football standings
	Conf.					Overall
Team		W		L			W		L
No. 2 Tennessee +	6	–	0	–	0	10	–	1	–	0
No. 16 Georgia Tech +	6	–	0	–	0	8	–	2	–	0
No. 5 Tulane +	5	–	0	–	0	8	–	1	–	1
Mississippi State	3	–	2	–	0	8	–	2	–	0
Ole Miss	2	–	2	–	0	7	–	2	–	0
Kentucky	2	–	2	–	1	6	–	2	–	1
Auburn	3	–	3	–	1	5	–	5	–	1
Alabama	2	–	3	–	1	5	–	3	–	1
Georgia	1	–	3	–	0	5	–	6	–	0
LSU	1	–	5	–	0	4	–	5	–	0
Vanderbilt	1	–	6	–	0	2	–	7	–	1
Florida	0	–	3	–	1	5	–	5	–	1
Sewanee	0	–	3	–	0	3	–	5	–	0
+ – Conference co-champions; Rankings from AP Poll

The 1939 LSU Tigers football team was an American football team that represented Louisiana State University (LSU) as a member of the Southeastern Conference (SEC) during the 1939 college football season. In their fifth year under head coach Bernie Moore, the Tigers compiled an overall record of 4–5, with a conference record of 1–5, and finished 10th in the SEC.

LSU was not ranked in the final AP poll, but it was ranked at No. 38 in the 1939 Williamson System ratings, and at No. 38 in the Litkenhous Ratings.

== Schedule ==
Date	Opponent	Rank	Site	Result	Attendance	Source
September 30	Ole Miss		Tiger Stadium; Baton Rouge, LA (rivalry)	L 7–14		
October 7	at Holy Cross*		Fitton Field; Worcester, MA	W 26–7	24,000	
October 14	Rice*		Tiger Stadium; Baton Rouge, LA	W 7–0	28,000	
October 21	Loyola (LA)*		Tiger Stadium; Baton Rouge, LA	W 20–0	10,000	
October 28	at Vanderbilt		Dudley Field; Nashville, TN	W 12–6	10,000	
November 4	No. 1 Tennessee^{†}	No. 18	Tiger Stadium; Baton Rouge, LA	L 0–20	42,000	
November 11	Mississippi State		Tiger Stadium; Baton Rouge, LA (rivalry)	L 12–15	11,000	
November 18	Auburn		Tiger Stadium; Baton Rouge, LA (rivalry)	L 7–21		
December 2	at No. 5 Tulane		Tulane Stadium; New Orleans, LA (Battle for the Rag)	L 20–33	45,000	
*Non-conference game; ^{†}Homecoming; Rankings from AP Poll released prior to the game

== Roster ==
No.	Player	Position	Height	Weight	Hometown	High School
–	Charles Anastasio	Halfback	6-0	178	White Castle, Louisiana	-
-	Roy Joe Anderson	Fullback	5-11	182	Shreveport, Louisiana	-
49	Dave Bartran	Guard	5-8	194	Laurel, Mississippi	-
–	F. Ogden Bauer	End	6-1	197	Cairo, Illinois	-
–	Dave Bernstein	Tackle	–	–	New Orleans, Louisiana	-
–	Leo Bird	Halfback	–	–	Shreveport, Louisiana	-
20	Simeon A. "Alex" Box	Wingback	–	–	Laurel, Mississippi	George S. Gardiner High School
16	Young Bussey	Halfback	5-9	184	Houston	-
–	Jimmy Cajoleas	Quarterback	5-8	186	New Orleans	-
–	Irving Campbell	Tackle	6-1	205	Fayette, Alabama	-
–	Dan Eastman	Tackle	–	–	New Orleans	-
–	Ken Kavanaugh	End	6-3	207	Little Rock, Arkansas	Little Rock Central High School
-	-	-	-	-	-	-
-	-	-	-	-	-	-
-	-	-	-	-	-	-
-	-	-	-	-	-	-
-	-	-	-	-	-	-
-	-	-	-	-	-	-
-	-	-	-	-	-	-
-	-	-	-	-	-	-
-	-	-	-	-	-	-
-	-	-	-	-	-	-
-	-	-	-	-	-	-
-	-	-	-	-	-	-
-	-	-	-	-	-	-
-	-	-	-	-	-	-
-	-	-	-	-	-	-
-	-	-	-	-	-	-
-	-	-	-	-	-	-
-	-	-	-	-	-	-
-	-	-	-	-	-	-
-	-	-	-	-	-	-

Roster from Fanbase.com
