= 1939 Auburn Tigers football team =

College football season

1939 Auburn Tigers football
- Conference: Southeastern Conference
- Record: 5–5–1 (3–3–1 SEC)
- Head coach: Jack Meagher (6th season)
- Home stadium: Auburn Stadium; Legion Field; Cramton Bowl

1939 Southeastern Conference football standings
| | Conf. | | | | | Overall |
| Team | | W | | L | | | W | | L |
|---|---|---|---|---|---|---|---|---|---|---|
| No. 2 Tennessee + | 6 | – | 0 | – | 0 | 10 | – | 1 | – | 0 |
| No. 16 Georgia Tech + | 6 | – | 0 | – | 0 | 8 | – | 2 | – | 0 |
| No. 5 Tulane + | 5 | – | 0 | – | 0 | 8 | – | 1 | – | 1 |
| Mississippi State | 3 | – | 2 | – | 0 | 8 | – | 2 | – | 0 |
| Ole Miss | 2 | – | 2 | – | 0 | 7 | – | 2 | – | 0 |
| Kentucky | 2 | – | 2 | – | 1 | 6 | – | 2 | – | 1 |
| Auburn | 3 | – | 3 | – | 1 | 5 | – | 5 | – | 1 |
| Alabama | 2 | – | 3 | – | 1 | 5 | – | 3 | – | 1 |
| Georgia | 1 | – | 3 | – | 0 | 5 | – | 6 | – | 0 |
| LSU | 1 | – | 5 | – | 0 | 4 | – | 5 | – | 0 |
| Vanderbilt | 1 | – | 6 | – | 0 | 2 | – | 7 | – | 1 |
| Florida | 0 | – | 3 | – | 1 | 5 | – | 5 | – | 1 |
| Sewanee | 0 | – | 3 | – | 0 | 3 | – | 5 | – | 0 |
+ – Conference co-champions; Rankings from AP Poll

The 1939 Auburn Tigers football team represented Auburn University in the 1939 college football season. The Tigers' were led by head coach Jack Meagher in his sixth season and finished the season with a record of five wins, five losses and one tie (5–5–1 overall, 3–3–1 in the SEC).

Auburn was not ranked in the final AP poll, but it was ranked at No. 30 in the 1939 Williamson System ratings, and at No. 39 in the final Litkenhous Ratings.

== Schedule ==
| Date | Opponent | Site | Result | Attendance | Source |
|---|---|---|---|---|---|
| September 29 | Birmingham–Southern* | Cramton Bowl; Montgomery, AL | W 6–0 | 10,000 | |
| October 7 | at Tulane | Tulane Stadium; New Orleans, LA (rivalry) | L 0–12 | 28,000 | |
| October 14 | Mississippi State | Legion Field; Birmingham, AL | W 7–0 | 10,000 | |
| October 21 | at Manhattan* | Polo Grounds; New York, NY | L 0–7 | 7,500–8,000 | |
| October 28 | at Georgia Tech | Grant Field; Atlanta, GA (rivalry) | L 6–7 | 18,000 | |
| November 4 | at Boston College* | Fenway Park; Boston, MA | L 7–13 | 15,000 | |
| November 11 | Villanova* | Legion Field; Birmingham, AL | W 10–9 | 15,000 | |
| November 18 | at LSU | Tiger Stadium; Baton Rouge, LA (rivalry) | W 21–7 | | |
| November 25 | vs. Georgia | Memorial Stadium; Columbus, GA (rivalry) | W 7–0 | 17,500 | |
| November 30 | Florida^{†} | Auburn Stadium; Auburn, AL (rivalry) | T 7–7 | 13,000 | |
| December 9 | at Tennessee | Shields–Watkins Field; Knoxville, TN (rivalry) | L 0–7 | 25,000 | |
*Non-conference game; ^{†}Homecoming
