= 1939 Mississippi State Maroons football team =

American college football season

1939 Mississippi State Maroons football
- Conference: Southeastern Conference
- Record: 8–2 (3–2 SEC)
- Head coach: Allyn McKeen (1st season)
- Home stadium: Scott Field

1939 Southeastern Conference football standings
	Conf.					Overall
Team		W		L			W		L
No. 2 Tennessee +	6	–	0	–	0	10	–	1	–	0
No. 16 Georgia Tech +	6	–	0	–	0	8	–	2	–	0
No. 5 Tulane +	5	–	0	–	0	8	–	1	–	1
Mississippi State	3	–	2	–	0	8	–	2	–	0
Ole Miss	2	–	2	–	0	7	–	2	–	0
Kentucky	2	–	2	–	1	6	–	2	–	1
Auburn	3	–	3	–	1	5	–	5	–	1
Alabama	2	–	3	–	1	5	–	3	–	1
Georgia	1	–	3	–	0	5	–	6	–	0
LSU	1	–	5	–	0	4	–	5	–	0
Vanderbilt	1	–	6	–	0	2	–	7	–	1
Florida	0	–	3	–	1	5	–	5	–	1
Sewanee	0	–	3	–	0	3	–	5	–	0
+ – Conference co-champions; Rankings from AP Poll

The 1939 Mississippi State Maroons football team was an American football team that represented Mississippi State College (now known as Mississippi State University) as a member of the Southeastern Conference (SEC) during the 1939 college football season. In their first year under head coach Allyn McKeen, the Maroons compiled an overall record of 8–2, with a conference record of 3–2, and finished fourth in the SEC.

Mississippi State was not ranked in the final AP poll, but it was ranked at No. 31 in the 1939 Williamson System ratings, and at No. 19 in the Litkenhous Ratings.

== Schedule ==
Date	Opponent	Site	Result	Attendance	Source
September 23	Howard (AL)*	Scott Field; Starkville, MS	W 45–0		
September 30	vs. Arkansas*	Crump Stadium; Memphis, TN	W 19–0	10,000	
October 7	at Florida	Florida Field; Gainesville, FL	W 14–0		
October 14	at Auburn	Legion Field; Birmingham, AL	L 0–7	10,000	
October 21	Southwestern (TN)*^{†}	Scott Field; Starkville, MS	W 37–0	5,000	
October 28	at No. 20 Alabama	Denny Stadium; Tuscaloosa, AL (rivalry)	L 0–7	15,000	
November 4	Birmingham–Southern*	Scott Field; Starkville, MS	W 28–0	6,000	
November 11	at LSU	Tiger Stadium; Baton Rouge, LA (rivalry)	W 15–12	11,000	
November 18	Millsaps*	Scott Field; Starkville, MS	W 40–0	5,000	
November 25	at Ole Miss	Hemingway Stadium; Oxford, MS (Egg Bowl)	W 18–6	20,000	
*Non-conference game; ^{†}Homecoming; Rankings from AP Poll released prior to the game
