= Ralph Wenzel =

Ralph Wenzel may refer to:

- Ralph Wenzel (end) (1918–2001), All-American football player for Tulane (1939), and for Pittsburgh Steelers (1942)
- Ralph Wenzel (guard) (1943–2012), professional American football player for Pittsburgh Steelers and San Diego Chargers
