= 1939 Sewanee Tigers football team =

American college football season

1939 Sewanee Tigers football
- Conference: Southeastern Conference
- Record: 3–5 (0–3 SEC)
- Head coach: Harry E. Clark (9th season)
- Home stadium: Hardee Field

1939 Southeastern Conference football standings
	Conf.					Overall
Team		W		L			W		L
No. 2 Tennessee +	6	–	0	–	0	10	–	1	–	0
No. 16 Georgia Tech +	6	–	0	–	0	8	–	2	–	0
No. 5 Tulane +	5	–	0	–	0	8	–	1	–	1
Mississippi State	3	–	2	–	0	8	–	2	–	0
Ole Miss	2	–	2	–	0	7	–	2	–	0
Kentucky	2	–	2	–	1	6	–	2	–	1
Auburn	3	–	3	–	1	5	–	5	–	1
Alabama	2	–	3	–	1	5	–	3	–	1
Georgia	1	–	3	–	0	5	–	6	–	0
LSU	1	–	5	–	0	4	–	5	–	0
Vanderbilt	1	–	6	–	0	2	–	7	–	1
Florida	0	–	3	–	1	5	–	5	–	1
Sewanee	0	–	3	–	0	3	–	5	–	0
+ – Conference co-champions; Rankings from AP Poll

The 1939 Sewanee Tigers football team was an American football team that represented Sewanee: The University of the South as a member of the Southeastern Conference during the 1939 college football season. In their ninth season under head coach Harry E. Clark, Sewanee compiled a 3–5 record.

== Schedule ==
Date	Opponent	Site	Result	Attendance	Source
September 30	at Washington and Lee*	Wilson Field; Lexington, VA	L 0–9	1,500	
October 7	at Tennessee	Shields–Watkins Field; Knoxville, TN	L 0–40	18,000	
October 20	Tennessee Tech*	Hardee Field; Sewanee, TN	W 9–7		
October 27	at Southwestern (TN)*	Crump Stadium; Memphis, TN (rivalry)	W 6–0		
November 4	at Chattanooga*	Chamberlain Field; Chattanooga, TN	L 7–10		
November 11	at Vanderbilt	Dudley Field; Nashville, TN (rivalry)	L 7–25		
November 18	at The Citadel*	Johnson Hagood Stadium; Charleston, SC	W 14–7		
November 25	at No. 5 Tulane	Tulane Stadium; New Orleans, LA	L 0–52	15,000	
*Non-conference game; Rankings from AP Poll released prior to the game
