= 1939 Florida Gators football team =

American college football season

1939 Florida Gators football
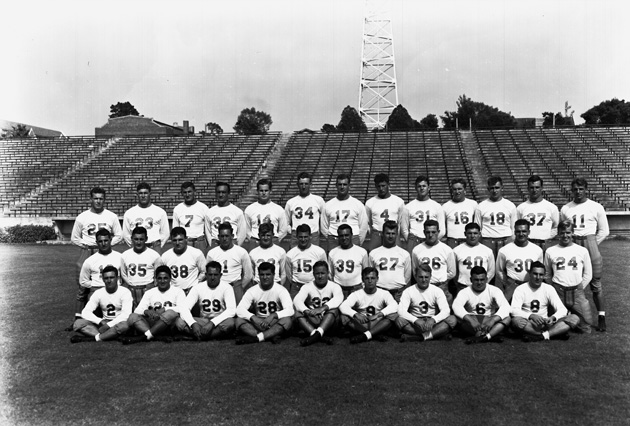
- Conference: Southeastern Conference
- Record: 5–5–1 (0–3–1 SEC)
- Head coach: Josh Cody (4th season)
- Captain: Clark Goff
- Home stadium: Florida Field

Uniform
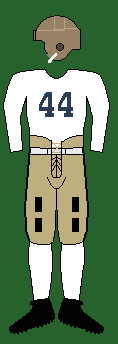

1939 Southeastern Conference football standings
	Conf.					Overall
Team		W		L			W		L
No. 2 Tennessee +	6	–	0	–	0	10	–	1	–	0
No. 16 Georgia Tech +	6	–	0	–	0	8	–	2	–	0
No. 5 Tulane +	5	–	0	–	0	8	–	1	–	1
Mississippi State	3	–	2	–	0	8	–	2	–	0
Ole Miss	2	–	2	–	0	7	–	2	–	0
Kentucky	2	–	2	–	1	6	–	2	–	1
Auburn	3	–	3	–	1	5	–	5	–	1
Alabama	2	–	3	–	1	5	–	3	–	1
Georgia	1	–	3	–	0	5	–	6	–	0
LSU	1	–	5	–	0	4	–	5	–	0
Vanderbilt	1	–	6	–	0	2	–	7	–	1
Florida	0	–	3	–	1	5	–	5	–	1
Sewanee	0	–	3	–	0	3	–	5	–	0
+ – Conference co-champions; Rankings from AP Poll

The 1939 Florida Gators football team represented the University of Florida during the 1939 college football season. The season was the fourth and final year for Josh Cody as the head coach of the Florida Gators football team. Cody's 1939 Florida Gators finished with a 5–5–1 overall record, but with a winless 0–3–1 record in the Southeastern Conference (SEC), placing twelfth of thirteen teams in the SEC.

Florida was ranked at No. 95 (out of 609 teams) in the final Litkenhous Ratings for 1939.

== Schedule ==
Date	Time	Opponent	Site	Result	Attendance	Source
September 23	8:00 p.m.	Stetson*	Florida Field; Gainesville, FL	W 21–0	5,000	
September 30		at Texas*	War Memorial Stadium; Austin, TX	L 0–12	17,000	
October 7		Mississippi State	Florida Field; Gainesville, FL	L 0–14		
October 12		at Boston College*	Fenway Park; Boston, MA	W 7–0	20,000	
October 21	8:00 p.m.	Tampa*	Florida Field; Gainesville, FL	W 7–0	6,000	
October 28		at Maryland*	Byrd Stadium; College Park, MD	W 14–0	10,000	
November 4		at South Carolina*	Columbia Municipal Stadium; Columbia, SC	L 0–6	5,000	
November 11		vs. Georgia	Fairfield Stadium; Jacksonville, FL (rivalry)	L 2–6	20,000	
November 18	8:15 p.m.	at Miami (FL)*	Burdine Stadium; Miami, FL (rivalry)	W 13–0	26,000–28,000	
November 25		No. 19 Georgia Tech^{†}	Florida Field; Gainesville, FL	L 7–21	15,000	
November 30		at Auburn	Auburn Stadium; Auburn, AL (rivalry)	T 7–7	13,000	
*Non-conference game; ^{†}Homecoming; Rankings from AP Poll released prior to the game; All times are in Eastern time

== Postseason ==
After leaving Florida, Josh Cody would later become the long-time head coach of the Temple Owls men's basketball team and the Temple University athletic director, and was inducted into the College Football Hall of Fame as a player in 1970.
