= Ted Arnold (American football) =

American college football player and official, hospital administrator (1894–1965)

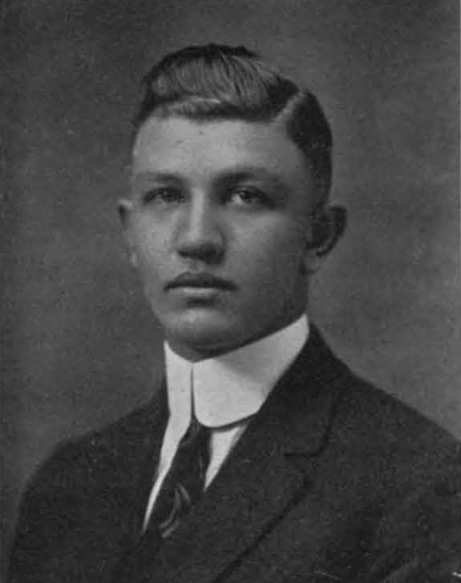
- Arnold pictured in The Glomerata (1914), Auburn yearbook

Profile
- Position: Quarterback

Personal information
- Born: May 16, 1894; Florida City, Florida, U.S.
- Died: July 6, 1965 (aged 71); Duval County, Florida, U.S.
- Listed weight: 156 lb (71 kg)

Career information
- College: Auburn (1911–1914)

Awards and highlights
- SIAA champion (1913)

William Edwin Arnold (May 16, 1894 – July 6, 1965) was an American college football player, referee, and hospital administrator.

He played as a quarterback for Mike Donahue's Auburn Tigers football team from 1911 to 1914. In 1913, he showed he could handle quarterback duties, allowing Kirk Newell to move to his more natural position at halfback. A native of Jacksonville, Florida, Arnold also played on the varsity basketball, baseball, and soccer teams as Auburn.

By the 1920s, Arnold had begun officiating high school football in Florida. He refereed the 1940 Sugar Bowl. In 1957, he was on the Gator Bowl executive committee.

Arnold served as executive vice president of St. Luke's Hospital in Jacksonville. He was also the president of the Florida Hospital Association and vice president of the American Hospital Association (AHA).

Arnold died on July 6, 1965.
