= Allyn McKeen =

American football player and coach (1905–1978)

Biographical details
- Born: January 26, 1905; Fulton, Kentucky, U.S.
- Died: September 13, 1978 (aged 73); Montgomery, Alabama, U.S.

Playing career
- 1925–1927: Tennessee
- Positions: Guard, end

Coaching career (HC unless noted)
- 1929–1934: West Tennessee State Teachers (assistant)
- 1937–1938: West Tennessee State Teachers
- 1939–1948: Mississippi State

Head coaching record
- Overall: 78–25–3
- Bowls: 1–0

Accomplishments and honors

Championships
- 1 SIAA (1938); 1 SEC (1941)

Awards
- SEC Coach of the Year (1940)
- College Football Hall of Fame; Inducted in 1991 (profile)

Allyn McKeen (January 26, 1905 – September 13, 1978) was an American college football player and coach. He served as the head football coach at West Tennessee State Normal School—now known as the University of Memphis—from 1937 to 1938 and Mississippi State College—now known as Mississippi State University—from 1939 to 1948, compiling a career head coaching record of 78–25–3. He was inducted into the College Football Hall of Fame as a coach in 1991.

== Playing career ==
McKeen played football as a guard and end at the University of Tennessee from 1925 to 1927, where he earned all-state honors. He was also the captain of the men's basketball and track teams. He helped preserve the tie with Vanderbilt by covering Bill Spears's receivers.

== Coaching career ==
From 1937 to 1938, McKeen coached at West Tennessee State Teachers College, now known as the University of Memphis, where he compiled a 13–6 record. His 1938 team went undefeated at 10–0. From 1939 to 1948, he coached at Mississippi State, where he compiled a 65–19–3 record. In 1940, he was named the SEC Coach of the Year after leading Mississippi State to its only undefeated season in school history. The following year, his squad captured the first and only Southeastern Conference championship in program history. He retired from coaching in 1948 after rendering his resignation to Mississippi State's athletic director, Dudy Noble. His .747 coaching record at Mississippi State rivals some of the winningest coaches in the SEC, such as Bear Bryant, Bob Neyland, Johnny Vaught, and Vince Dooley. However, McKeen only coached in Starkville for nine years, while the other leaders on the SEC's wins list coached for more than 15 years.

At the time of his departure from Starkville, McKeen was the winningest coach in Mississippi State history, a rank he would keep until Jackie Sherrill passed him during the 2000 season. McKeen is now third on the school's all-time wins list, behind Sherrill and Dan Mullen.

== Late life and honors ==
After retiring from coaching, McKeen served as the director of the Blue–Gray Football Classic. He was inducted into the Mississippi Sports Hall of Fame in 1977.

== Head coaching record ==
Year	Team	Overall	Conference	Standing	Bowl/playoffs	AP^{#}
West Tennessee State Teachers (Southern Intercollegiate Athletic Association) (1937–1938)
1937	West Tennessee State Teachers	3–6	1–5	T–27th		
1938	West Tennessee State Teachers	10–0	7–0	1st		
West Tennessee State Teachers:		13–6	8–5			
Mississippi State Maroons (Southeastern Conference) (1939–1948)
1939	Mississippi State	8–2	3–2	4th		
1940	Mississippi State	10–0–1	4–0–1	2nd	W Orange	9
1941	Mississippi State	8–1–1	4–0–1	1st		16
1942	Mississippi State	8–2	5–2	4th		18
1943	No team—World War II					
1944	Mississippi State	6–2	3–2	5th		
1945	Mississippi State	6–3	2–3	T–7th		
1946	Mississippi State	8–2	3–2	5th		
1947	Mississippi State	7–3	2–2	4th		
1948	Mississippi State	4–4–1	3–3	7th		
Mississippi State:		65–19–3	29–16–2			
Total:		78–25–3				
National championship Conference title Conference division title or championship game berth
^{#}Rankings from final AP Poll.

== See also ==
- List of college football career coaching winning percentage leaders
