= 1939 Vanderbilt Commodores football team =

American college football season

1939 Vanderbilt Commodores football
- Conference: Southeastern Conference
- Record: 2–7–1 (1–6 SEC)
- Head coach: Ray Morrison (6th season)
- Captain: Raymond Andrus
- Home stadium: Dudley Field

1939 Southeastern Conference football standings
	Conf.					Overall
Team		W		L			W		L
No. 2 Tennessee +	6	–	0	–	0	10	–	1	–	0
No. 16 Georgia Tech +	6	–	0	–	0	8	–	2	–	0
No. 5 Tulane +	5	–	0	–	0	8	–	1	–	1
Mississippi State	3	–	2	–	0	8	–	2	–	0
Ole Miss	2	–	2	–	0	7	–	2	–	0
Kentucky	2	–	2	–	1	6	–	2	–	1
Auburn	3	–	3	–	1	5	–	5	–	1
Alabama	2	–	3	–	1	5	–	3	–	1
Georgia	1	–	3	–	0	5	–	6	–	0
LSU	1	–	5	–	0	4	–	5	–	0
Vanderbilt	1	–	6	–	0	2	–	7	–	1
Florida	0	–	3	–	1	5	–	5	–	1
Sewanee	0	–	3	–	0	3	–	5	–	0
+ – Conference co-champions; Rankings from AP Poll

The 1939 Vanderbilt Commodores football team represented Vanderbilt University during the 1939 college football season. The Commodores were led by Ray Morrison, who served in the fifth season of his second stint, and sixth overall, as head coach. Members of the Southeastern Conference, Vanderbilt went 2–7–1 overall and 1–6 in conference play. The Commodores played their six home games at Dudley Field in Nashville, Tennessee. On October 7, Kentucky defeated Vanderbilt. 21–13, for the 100th loss in the schools football program.

Vanderbilt was ranked at No. 84 (out of 609 teams) in the final Litkenhous Ratings for 1939.

== Schedule ==
Date	Opponent	Site	Result	Attendance	Source
September 20	Tennessee Tech*	Dudley Field; Nashville, TN	T 13–13	8,000	
September 30	at Rice*	Rice Field; Houston, TX	W 13–12	20,000	
October 7	Kentucky	Dudley Field; Nashville, TN (rivalry)	L 13–21	10,000	
October 14	VMI*	Dudley Field; Nashville, TN	L 13–20	5,000	
October 21	Georgia Tech	Grant Field; Atlanta, GA (rivalry)	L 6–14	19,000	
October 28	at LSU	Dudley Field; Nashville, TN	L 6–12	10,000	
November 4	vs. Ole Miss	Crump Stadium; Memphis, TN (rivalry)	L 7–14	15,000	
November 11	vs. Sewanee	Dudley Field; Nashville, TN (rivalry)	W 25–7	7,000	
November 18	at No. 1 Tennessee	Shields–Watkins Field; Knoxville, TN (rivalry)	L 0–13	25,000	
November 30	Alabama	Dudley Field; Nashville, TN	L 0–39	18,000	
*Non-conference game; Rankings from AP Poll released prior to the game
