= List of Tennessee Volunteers head football coaches =

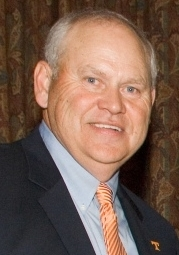
Phillip Fulmer was head coach of the program from 1992 to 2008.

The Tennessee Volunteers college football team represents the University of Tennessee in the Southeastern Conference (SEC). The Vols compete as part of the National Collegiate Athletic Association (NCAA) Division I Football Bowl Subdivision. The program has had 27 head coaches since its formation during the 1891 season. Josh Heupel started serving as the head coach in 2021.

The team has played 1,215 games over 118 seasons of Tennessee football. Prior to the 1899 season, the Volunteers did not have an official head coach while compiling a record of twelve wins and eleven losses (.522) between 1891 and 1898. Since 1899, 11 coaches have led the Volunteers in postseason bowl games: Robert Neyland, John Barnhill, Bowden Wyatt, Doug Dickey, Bill Battle, Johnny Majors, Phillip Fulmer, Lane Kiffin, Derek Dooley, Butch Jones, and Josh Heupel. Five of those coaches also won conference championships: Zora Clevenger captured one as a member of the Southern Intercollegiate Athletic Association, Neyland captured two as a member of the Southern Conference and Neyland, Wyatt, Majors, and Fulmer won a combined twelve as a member of the SEC. During their tenures, Neyland and Fulmer each won national championships with the Volunteers.

Neyland is the leader in total number of seasons coached and games won, with 173 victories during his 21 years with the program. Barnhill has the highest winning percentage with .846. Jeremy Pruitt has the lowest overall winning percentage with .263 due to vacated wins brought on by NCAA investigation into the impermissible payment scandal during his time as head coach. James DePree has the lowest winning percentage with .306 based on overall wins and losses. Of the 23 head coaches who have led the Volunteers, Neyland, Wyatt, Dickey, Majors, and Fulmer have been inducted into the College Football Hall of Fame in Atlanta, GA.

== Key ==
Key to symbols in coaches list
General		Overall		Conference		Postseason (Note: Although the first Rose Bowl Game was played in 1902, it has been continuously played since the 1916 game, and is recognized as the oldest bowl game by the NCAA. "—" indicates any season prior to 1916 when postseason games were not played.)	
No.	Order of coaches (Note: A running total of the number of head coaches, with coaches who served separate tenures being counted only once. Interim head coaches are represented with "Int" and are not counted in the running total. "—" indicates the team played but either without a coach or no coach is on record. "X" indicates an interim year without play.)	GC	Games coached	CW	Conference wins	PW	Postseason wins
DC	Division championships	OW	Overall wins	CL	Conference losses	PL	Postseason losses
CC	Conference championships	OL	Overall losses	CT	Conference ties	PT	Postseason ties
NC	National championships	OT	Overall ties (Note: Overtime rules in college football were introduced in 1996, making ties impossible in the period since.)	C%	Conference winning percentage		
†	Elected to the College Football Hall of Fame	O%	Overall winning percentage (Note: When computing the win–loss percentage, a tie counts as half a win and half a loss.)				

== Coaches ==
List of head football coaches showing season(s) coached, overall records, conference records, postseason records, championships, and selected awards (Note: Statistics correct as of the end of the 2025 NCAA Division I FBS football season.)
No.	Name	Year(s) (Note: Tennessee did not field teams for the 1917 and 1918 seasons due to World War I and again for the 1943 season due to World War II.)	Season(s)	GC	OW	OL	OT	O%	CW	CL	CT	C%	PW	PL	PT	DC (Note: Divisional champions advanced to the SEC Championship Game from the institution of divisional play beginning in the 1992 season through the 2023 season. During that time, Tennessee has competed as a member of the SEC East. In the 2024 season, conference championship berths were awarded to two teams with the best conference records, following the SEC's addition of Texas and Oklahoma.)	CC	NC	Awards
1	J. A. Pierce	1899–1900	2	14	9	4	1	0.679	2	3	1	0.417	—	—	—	—	—	0	—
2	Gilbert Kelly	1901	1	8	3	3	2	0.500	1	1	2	0.500	—	—	—	—	—	0	—
3	Hubert Fisher	1902–1903	2	17	10	7	0	0.588	4	6	0	0.400	—	—	—	—	—	0	—
4	Sax Crawford	1904	1	9	3	5	1	0.389	1	4	0	0.200	—	—	—	—	—	0	—
5	James DePree	1905–1906	2	18	4	11	3	0.306	0	8	2	0.100	—	—	—	—	—	0	—
6	George Levene	1907–1909	3	28	15	10	3	0.589	7	9	1	0.441	—	—	—	—	—	0	—
7	Lex Stone	1910	1	9	3	5	1	0.389	1	4	0	0.200	—	—	—	—	—	0	—
8	Zora Clevenger	1911–1915	5	43	26	15	2	0.628	8	12	0	0.400	—	—	—	—	—	0	—
9	John R. Bender	1916, 1919–1920	1, 2	27	18	5	4	0.741	10	5	3	0.639	0	0	0	—	—	0	—
10	M. B. Banks	1921–1925	5	45	27	15	3	0.633	14	11	2	0.556	0	0	0	—	—	0	—
11, 13, 15	Robert Neyland^{†}	1926–1934, 1936–1940, 1946–1952	9, 5, 7	216	173	31	12	0.829	103	17	10	0.831	2	5	0	—	8	4 – 1938, 1940, 1950, 1951	AP SEC Coach of the Year (1951); SEC Coach of the Year (1936, 1938, 1950)
12	W. H. Britton	1935	1	9	4	5	0	0.444	2	3	0	0.400	0	0	0	—	0	0	—
14	John Barnhill	1941–1942, 1944–1945	2, 2	39	32	5	2	0.846	15	3	1	0.816	1	1	0	—	0	0	SEC Coach of the Year (1944)
16	Harvey Robinson	1953–1954	2	21	10	10	1	0.500	4	7	1	0.375	0	0	0	—	0	0	—
17	Bowden Wyatt^{†}	1955–1962	8	82	49	29	4	0.622	29	23	4	0.554	1	1	0	—	1	0	AFCA Coach of the Year (1956); AP SEC Coach of the Year (1956); SEC Coach of the Year (1956)
18	Jim McDonald	1963	1	10	5	5	0	0.500	3	5	0	0.375	0	0	0	—	0	0	—
19	Doug Dickey^{†}	1964–1969	6	65	46	15	4	0.738	23	10	4	0.676	2	3	0	—	0	1 – 1967	AP SEC Coach of the Year (1967); UPI SEC Coach of the Year (1967); SEC Coach of the Year (1965, 1967)
20	Bill Battle	1970–1976	7	83	59	22	2	0.723	22	18	1	0.549	4	1	0	—	0	0	—
21	Johnny Majors^{†}	1977–1992 (Note: Johnny Majors finished the 1992 season with a record of five wins and three losses. While Majors was recovering from heart surgery, Phillip Fulmer served as interim head coach for the first three games of the season and for the 1993 Hall of Fame Bowl. Fulmer was then named head coach at the conclusion of the regular season following the resignation of Majors.)	16	186	116	82	8	0.645	57	40	3	0.585	7	4	0	0	3	0	AP SEC Coach of the Year (1985); UPI SEC Coach of the Year (1985); SEC Coach of the Year (1985)
22	Phillip Fulmer^{†}	1992–2008	17	204	151	52	1	0.743	91	35	1	0.720	8	7	0	6	2	1 – 1998	AFCA Coach of the Year (1998); Eddie Robinson Coach of the Year (1998); George Munger Award (1998); Sporting News College Football Coach of the Year (1998); AP SEC Coach of the Year (1998); SEC Coach of the Year (1998)
23	Lane Kiffin	2009	1	13	7	6	—	0.538	4	4	—	0.500	0	1	—	0	0	0	—
24	Derek Dooley	2010–2012	3	36	15	21	—	0.417	4	19	—	0.174	0	1	—	0	0	0	—
int	Jim Chaney	2012	1	1	1	0	—	1.000	1	0	—	1.000	—	—	—	—	—	0	—
25	Butch Jones	2013–2017	5	61	34	27	—	0.557	14	24	—	0.368	3	0	—	0	0	0	—
int	Brady Hoke	2017	1	2	0	2	—	0.000	0	2	—	0.000	—	—	—	—	—	0	—
26	Jeremy Pruitt	2018–2020	3	35	16	19	—	0.457	2	16	—	0.385	1	0	—	0	0	0	—
27	Josh Heupel	2021–present	5	72	51	21	—	0.708	27	17	—	0.614	2	3	—	0	0	0	—
