= 1939 Georgia Tech Yellow Jackets football team =

American college football season

1939 Georgia Tech Yellow Jackets football

SEC co-champion Orange Bowl champion

Orange Bowl, W 21–7 vs. Missouri
- Conference: Southeastern Conference

Ranking
- AP: No. 16
- Record: 8–2 (6–0 SEC)
- Head coach: William Alexander (20th season)
- Offensive scheme: Single-wing
- Captain: F. W. "Buck" Murphy
- Home stadium: Grant Field

1939 Southeastern Conference football standings
	Conf.					Overall
Team		W		L			W		L
No. 2 Tennessee +	6	–	0	–	0	10	–	1	–	0
No. 16 Georgia Tech +	6	–	0	–	0	8	–	2	–	0
No. 5 Tulane +	5	–	0	–	0	8	–	1	–	1
Mississippi State	3	–	2	–	0	8	–	2	–	0
Ole Miss	2	–	2	–	0	7	–	2	–	0
Kentucky	2	–	2	–	1	6	–	2	–	1
Auburn	3	–	3	–	1	5	–	5	–	1
Alabama	2	–	3	–	1	5	–	3	–	1
Georgia	1	–	3	–	0	5	–	6	–	0
LSU	1	–	5	–	0	4	–	5	–	0
Vanderbilt	1	–	6	–	0	2	–	7	–	1
Florida	0	–	3	–	1	5	–	5	–	1
Sewanee	0	–	3	–	0	3	–	5	–	0
+ – Conference co-champions; Rankings from AP Poll

The 1939 Georgia Tech Yellow Jackets football team represented the Georgia Institute of Technology during the 1939 college football season. The Yellow Jackets were led by 20th-year head coach William Alexander and played their home games at Grant Field in Atlanta, Georgia.

Georgia Tech finished undefeated in Southeastern Conference play, claiming a share of the conference title with Tennessee and Tulane. They suffered two close non-conference losses: the first, a season-opening road trip loss to Notre Dame; and the second, a one-point loss to Duke at home, in which Georgia Tech missed the would-be tying point-after attempt in the second quarter and missed the winning field goal in the final minute of the game. The Yellow Jackets finished ranked in the final AP Poll for the first time, and were invited to their second ever bowl game, the 1940 Orange Bowl, where they defeated Missouri.

== Schedule ==
Date	Opponent	Rank	Site	Result	Attendance	Source
October 7	at Notre Dame*		Notre Dame Stadium; Notre Dame, IN (rivalry)	L 14–17	30,000	
October 14	Howard (AL)*		Grant Field; Atlanta, GA	W 35–0	10,000	
October 21	Vanderbilt		Grant Field; Atlanta, GA (rivalry)	W 14–6	19,000	
October 28	Auburn		Grant Field; Atlanta, GA (rivalry)	W 7–6	18,000	
November 4	No. 12 Duke*		Grant Field; Atlanta, GA	L 6–7	30,000	
November 11	No. 18 Kentucky		Grant Field; Atlanta, GA	W 13–6	25,000	
November 18	at Alabama		Legion Field; Birmingham, AL (rivalry)	W 6–0	23,000	
November 25	at Florida	No. 19	Florida Field; Gainesville, FL	W 21–7	15,000	
December 2	at Georgia		Grant Field; Atlanta, GA (rivalry)	W 13–0	30,000	
January 1	vs. No. 6 Missouri*	No. 16	Burdine Stadium; Miami, FL (Orange Bowl)	W 21–7	35,000	
*Non-conference game; Rankings from AP Poll released prior to the game
