= Red Dawson =

American football player and coach (1906–1983)

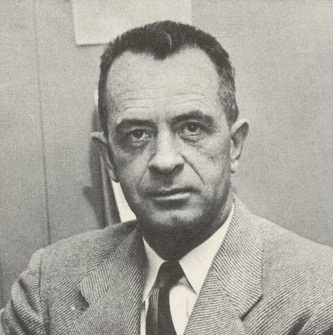
- Dawson pictured in The 1954 Owl, Pittsburgh yearbook

Biographical details
- Born: December 20, 1906; Minneapolis, Minnesota, U.S.
- Died: June 10, 1983 (aged 76); Ocala, Florida, U.S.

Playing career
- 1929–1931: Tulane
- Position: Quarterback

Coaching career (HC unless noted)
- 1932–1935: Minnesota (backfield)
- 1936–1941: Tulane
- 1942: Minnesota (assistant)
- 1946–1949: Buffalo Bills (AAFC)
- 1950–1951: Michigan State (assistant)
- 1952–1954: Pittsburgh

Head coaching record
- Overall: 45–30–5 (college); 19–25–4 (AAFC)
- Bowls: 0–1

Accomplishments and honors

Championships
- 1 SEC (1939)

Awards
- All-Southern (1931)

Lowell Potter "Red" Dawson (December 20, 1906 – June 10, 1983) was an American football coach for the University of Pittsburgh Panthers and the Tulane Green Wave at the collegiate level and the AAFC's Buffalo Bills at the professional level. He was a native of River Falls, Wisconsin.

He learned the craft of football coaching at the University of Minnesota under Bernie Bierman, his former coach at Tulane. At Pitt he coached future Pro Football Hall of Famer Joe Schmidt and won Pittsburgh's "Dapper Dan" sports award in 1952. Dawson's greatest successes as a coach, however, were with Tulane and Buffalo. His 1939 Tulane squad went through the season undefeated before a disappointing loss to Texas A&M in the Sugar Bowl. In 1948 his Buffalo Bills team captured the AAFC Eastern Division title in a playoff against the Baltimore Colts, though they ultimately lost the AAFC Championship Game to the Cleveland Browns. Dawson's final win–loss record was 36–19–4 at Tulane, 9–11–1 at Pittsburgh, and 19–25–4 at Buffalo.

== Head coaching record ==
=== College ===
Year	Team	Overall	Conference	Standing	Bowl/playoffs	AP^{#}
Tulane Green Wave (Southeastern Conference) (1936–1941)
1936	Tulane	6–3–1	2–3–1	8th		
1937	Tulane	5–4–1	2–3–1	9th		
1938	Tulane	7–2–1	4–1–1	T–2nd		19
1939	Tulane	8–1–1	6–0	T–1st	L Sugar	5
1940	Tulane	5–5	1–3	10th		
1941	Tulane	5–4	2–3	8th		
Tulane:		36–19–4	17–13–3			
Pittsburgh Panthers (Independent) (1952–1954)
1952	Pittsburgh	6–3				
1953	Pittsburgh	3–5–1				
1954	Pittsburgh	0–3				
Pittsburgh:		9–11–1				
Total:		45–30–5				
National championship Conference title Conference division title or championship game berth
^{#}Rankings from final AP Poll.

=== Professional ===
Team	Year	Regular season					Postseason			
Team	Year	Won	Lost	Ties	Win %	Finish	Won	Lost	Win %	Result
BUF	1946	3	10	1	.250	T-2nd in AAFC East	–	–	–	–
BUF	1947	8	4	2	.643	2nd in AAFC East	–	–	–	–
BUF	1948	7	7	0	.500	1st in AAFC East	1	1	.500	Lost to Cleveland Browns in AAFC Championship.
BUF	1949	1	4	1	.250	3rd in AAFC	–	–	–	–
BUF Total		19	25	4	.438		–	–	–	–
AAFC Total		19	25	4	.438		1	1	.500	–
Total		19	25	4	.438		1	1	.500	–
