= 1939 Georgia Bulldogs football team =

American college football season

1939 Georgia Bulldogs football
- Conference: Southeastern Conference
- Record: 5–6 (1–3 SEC)
- Head coach: Wally Butts (1st season)
- Home stadium: Sanford Stadium

1939 Southeastern Conference football standings
	Conf.					Overall
Team		W		L			W		L
No. 2 Tennessee +	6	–	0	–	0	10	–	1	–	0
No. 16 Georgia Tech +	6	–	0	–	0	8	–	2	–	0
No. 5 Tulane +	5	–	0	–	0	8	–	1	–	1
Mississippi State	3	–	2	–	0	8	–	2	–	0
Ole Miss	2	–	2	–	0	7	–	2	–	0
Kentucky	2	–	2	–	1	6	–	2	–	1
Auburn	3	–	3	–	1	5	–	5	–	1
Alabama	2	–	3	–	1	5	–	3	–	1
Georgia	1	–	3	–	0	5	–	6	–	0
LSU	1	–	5	–	0	4	–	5	–	0
Vanderbilt	1	–	6	–	0	2	–	7	–	1
Florida	0	–	3	–	1	5	–	5	–	1
Sewanee	0	–	3	–	0	3	–	5	–	0
+ – Conference co-champions; Rankings from AP Poll

The 1939 Georgia Bulldogs football team was an American football team that represented the University of Georgia as a member of the Southeastern Conference (SEC) during the 1939 college football season. In their first year under head coach Wally Butts, the Bulldogs compiled an overall record of 5–6, with a conference record of 1–3, and finished 9th in the SEC.

Georgia was ranked at No. 69 (out of 609 teams) in the final Litkenhous Ratings for 1939.

== Schedule ==
Date	Time	Opponent	Site	Result	Attendance	Source
September 30		The Citadel*	Sanford Stadium; Athens, GA	W 26–0	15,000	
October 6		at Furman*	Sirrine Stadium; Greenville, SC	L 0–20	12,000	
October 14		Holy Cross*^{†}	Sanford Stadium; Athens, GA	L 0–13	15,000	
October 21		at Kentucky	Du Pont Manual Stadium; Louisville, KY	L 6–13	14,000	
October 28		at NYU*	Yankee Stadium; Bronx, NY	L 13–14	15,000	
November 3		Mercer*	Sanford Stadium; Athens, GA	W 16–9	6,000	
November 11		vs. Florida	Fairfield Stadium; Jacksonville, FL (rivalry)	W 6–2	20,000	
November 18		South Carolina*	Sanford Stadium; Athens, GA (rivalry)	W 33–7	7,000	
November 25		vs. Auburn	Memorial Stadium; Columbus, GA (rivalry)	L 0–7	17,500	
December 2		at Georgia Tech	Grant Field; Atlanta, GA (rivalry)	L 0–13	30,000	
December 8	8:15 p.m.	at Miami (FL)*	Burdine Stadium; Miami, FL	W 13–0	16,402	
*Non-conference game; ^{†}Homecoming; All times are in Eastern time
