= 1939 Tennessee Volunteers football team =

American college football season

1939 Tennessee Volunteers football

SEC co-champion

Rose Bowl, L 14–0 vs. USC
- Conference: Southeastern Conference

Ranking
- AP: No. 2
- Record: 10–1 (6–0 SEC)
- Head coach: Robert Neyland (13th season)
- Offensive scheme: Single-wing
- Base defense: Multiple
- Home stadium: Shields–Watkins Field

1939 Southeastern Conference football standings
	Conf.					Overall
Team		W		L			W		L
No. 2 Tennessee +	6	–	0	–	0	10	–	1	–	0
No. 16 Georgia Tech +	6	–	0	–	0	8	–	2	–	0
No. 5 Tulane +	5	–	0	–	0	8	–	1	–	1
Mississippi State	3	–	2	–	0	8	–	2	–	0
Ole Miss	2	–	2	–	0	7	–	2	–	0
Kentucky	2	–	2	–	1	6	–	2	–	1
Auburn	3	–	3	–	1	5	–	5	–	1
Alabama	2	–	3	–	1	5	–	3	–	1
Georgia	1	–	3	–	0	5	–	6	–	0
LSU	1	–	5	–	0	4	–	5	–	0
Vanderbilt	1	–	6	–	0	2	–	7	–	1
Florida	0	–	3	–	1	5	–	5	–	1
Sewanee	0	–	3	–	0	3	–	5	–	0
+ – Conference co-champions; Rankings from AP Poll

The 1939 Tennessee Volunteers represented the University of Tennessee in the 1939 college football season. Playing as a member of the Southeastern Conference (SEC), the team was led by head coach Robert Neyland, in his 13th year, and played their home games at Shields–Watkins Field in Knoxville, Tennessee. They finished the season with a record of ten wins and one loss (10–1 overall, 6–0 in the SEC), as SEC Champions and with a loss against USC in the 1940 Rose Bowl.

Tennessee entered the season as defending national champions and coach Neyland led the team to their second of three consecutive undefeated regular seasons. The 1939 Vols were also the last team in NCAA history to go undefeated, untied, and unscored upon in the regular season. Tennessee had two All-American performers that year: George Cafego, a single-wing halfback, and Ed Molinski, a guard.

== Schedule ==
Date	Opponent	Rank	Site	Result	Attendance	Source
September 29	at NC State*		Riddick Stadium; Raleigh, NC	W 13–0	12,000	
October 7	Sewanee		Shields–Watkins Field; Knoxville, TN	W 40–0	18,000	
October 14	at Chattanooga*		Chamberlain Field; Chattanooga, TN	W 28–0	6,987	
October 21	No. 8 Alabama^{†}	No. 5	Shields–Watkins Field; Knoxville, TN (Third Saturday in October)	W 21–0	40,000	
October 28	Mercer*	No. 1	Shields–Watkins Field; Knoxville, TN	W 17–0	6,000	
November 4	at No. 18 LSU	No. 1	Tiger Stadium; Baton Rouge, LA	W 20–0	42,000	
November 11	The Citadel*	No. 1	Shields–Watkins Field; Knoxville, TN	W 34–0	8,000	
November 18	Vanderbilt	No. 1	Shields–Watkins Field; Knoxville, TN (rivalry)	W 13–0	25,000	
November 30	at Kentucky	No. 4	McLean Stadium; Lexington, KY (rivalry)	W 19–0	19,000	
December 9	Auburn	No. 2	Shields–Watkins Field; Knoxville, TN (rivalry)	W 7–0	25,000	
January 1, 1940	vs. No. 3 USC	No. 2	Rose Bowl; Pasadena, CA (Rose Bowl)	L 0–14	92,200	
*Non-conference game; ^{†}Homecoming; Rankings from AP Poll released prior to the game

== Rankings ==
Ranking movements Legend: ██ Increase in ranking ██ Decrease in ranking ( ) = First-place votes
	Week								
Poll	1	2	3	4	5	6	7	8	Final
AP	5 (26.5)	1 (83)	1 (67)	1 (81)	1 (66)	2 (33)	4 (18)	2 (19)	2 (26)
