= Harry Mehre =

American football and basketball player and coach (1901–1978)

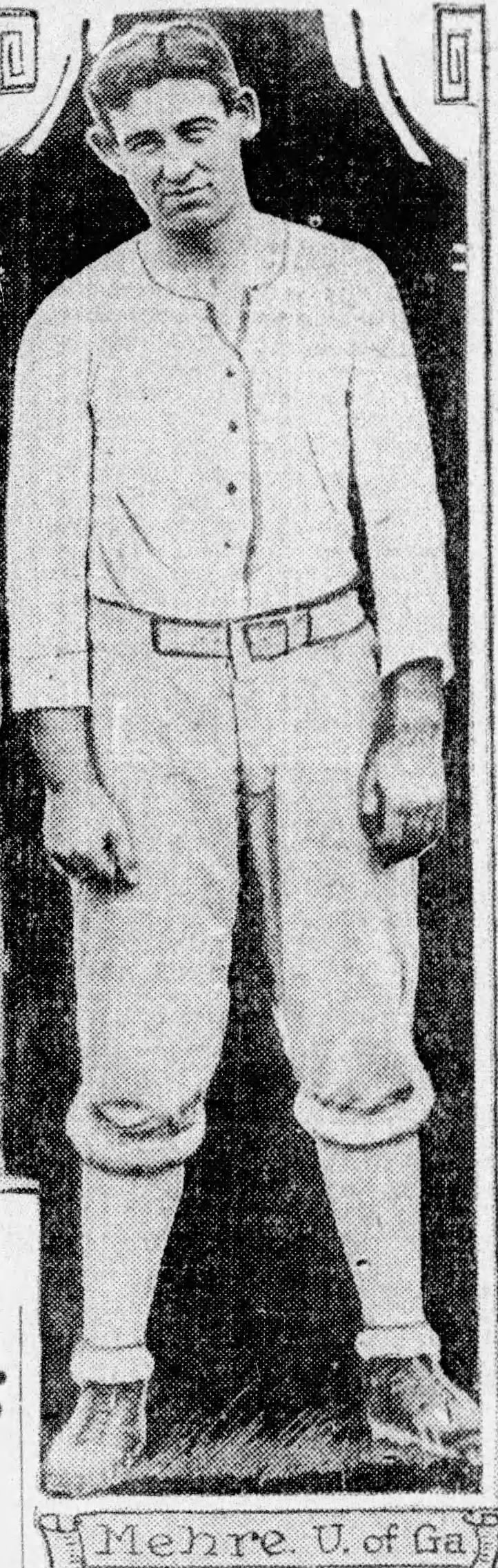
- Mehre in 1929

Biographical details
- Born: September 19, 1901; Huntington, Indiana, U.S.
- Died: September 27, 1978 (aged 77); Atlanta, Georgia, U.S.

Playing career

Football
- 1919–1921: Notre Dame
- 1922–1923: Minneapolis Marines

Basketball
- 1919–1922: Notre Dame
- Positions: Center (football); Center (basketball)

Coaching career (HC unless noted)

Football
- 1923: Minneapolis Marines
- 1923: St. Thomas (MN) (line)
- 1924–1927: Georgia (assistant)
- 1928–1937: Georgia
- 1938–1945: Ole Miss

Basketball
- 1923: St. Thomas (MN)

Head coaching record
- Overall: 98–60–7 (college); 4–5–2 (NFL)

Harry J. Mehre (September 18, 1901 – September 27, 1978) was an American football and basketball player and coach. He served as the head football coach at the University of Georgia (1928–1937) and the University of Mississippi (1938–1945), compiling a career college football record of 98–60–7. Mehre also served as the head coach of the Minneapolis Marines of the NFL in 1923, tallying a mark of 4–5–2.

== Early years and education ==
Harry Mehre was born in Huntington, Indiana on September 10, 1901. Mehre attended the University of Notre Dame and played center on both the football and basketball teams (serving as co-captain for the 1919–1920 basketball team and captain of the 1920–1921 team).

== Sports career ==
After Mehre graduated in 1922, he played in that year and in 1923 with the Minneapolis Marines, also serving as head coach in 1923. Mehre was also a football line coach and head basketball coach at the University of St. Thomas in St. Paul, Minnesota.

In 1924, Mehre came to the University of Georgia as an assistant coach under George Woodruff. Upon Woodruff's retirement, Mehre became head coach and compiled a 59–34–6 record over ten years. He also was Georgia's athletic director. After leaving Georgia, Mehre served as the head coach at the University of Mississippi from 1938 to 1945, compiling a 39–26–1 record there.

== Death and legacy ==
Mehre was inducted into the Georgia Sports Hall of Fame in 1971. He died in Atlanta, in 1978. In 1986, Butts–Mehre Heritage Hall was dedicated on the University of Georgia campus in honor of Mehre and fellow Bulldogs coach Wally Butts.

== Head coaching record ==
=== College ===
Year	Team	Overall	Conference	Standing	Bowl/playoffs	AP^{#}
Georgia Bulldogs (Southern Conference) (1928–1932)
1928	Georgia	4–5	2–4	17th		
1929	Georgia	6–4	4–2	T–7th		
1930	Georgia	7–2–1	3–2–1	10th		
1931	Georgia	8–2	6–1	4th		
1932	Georgia	2–5–2	2–4–2	15th		
Georgia Bulldogs (Southeastern Conference) (1933–1937)
1933	Georgia	8–2	3–1	3rd		
1934	Georgia	7–3	3–2	5th		
1935	Georgia	6–4	2–4	11th		
1936	Georgia	5–4–1	3–3	T–6th		
1937	Georgia	6–3–2	1–2–2	10th		
Georgia:		59–34–6	29–25–5			
Ole Miss Rebels (Southeastern Conference) (1938–1945)
1938	Ole Miss	9–2	3–2	4th		
1939	Ole Miss	7–2	2–2	T–5th		
1940	Ole Miss	9–2	3–1	3rd		
1941	Ole Miss	6–2–1	2–1–1	5th		17
1942	Ole Miss	2–7	0–5	T–11th		
1943	No team—World War II					
1944	Ole Miss	2–6	2–3	7th		
1945	Ole Miss	4–5	3–3	T–5th		
Ole Miss:		39–26–1	15–17–1			
Total:		98–60–7				
