= Bobby Wood (American football) =

American football player (1916–1973)

No. 29
- Positions: Offensive tackle, Defensive tackle

Personal information
- Born: January 14, 1916; McComb, Mississippi, U.S.
- Died: October 22, 1973 (aged 57); McComb, Mississippi, U.S.
- Listed height: 6 ft 2 in (1.88 m)
- Listed weight: 230 lb (104 kg)

Career information
- High school: McComb
- College: Alabama (1936-1939)
- NFL draft: 1940: 4th round, 30th overall pick

Career history
- Chicago Cardinals (1940); Green Bay Packers (1940)

Career NFL statistics
- Games played: 3
- Stats at Pro Football Reference

Robert Harry Wood (January 14, 1916 – October 22, 1973) was an American professional football offensive tackle/defensive tackle in the National Football League (NFL) who played for the Chicago Cardinals and the Green Bay Packers. Wood played collegiate ball for the University of Alabama before being drafted by the Cleveland Rams in the fourth round of the 1940 NFL draft. Selected to play in the Pro Bowl and First-team All-Pro. He played professionally for one season, in 1940. He left his professional football career to serve in WWII alongside his three brothers.
