= 1940 Sugar Bowl =

American college football game

- 6th Sugar Bowl
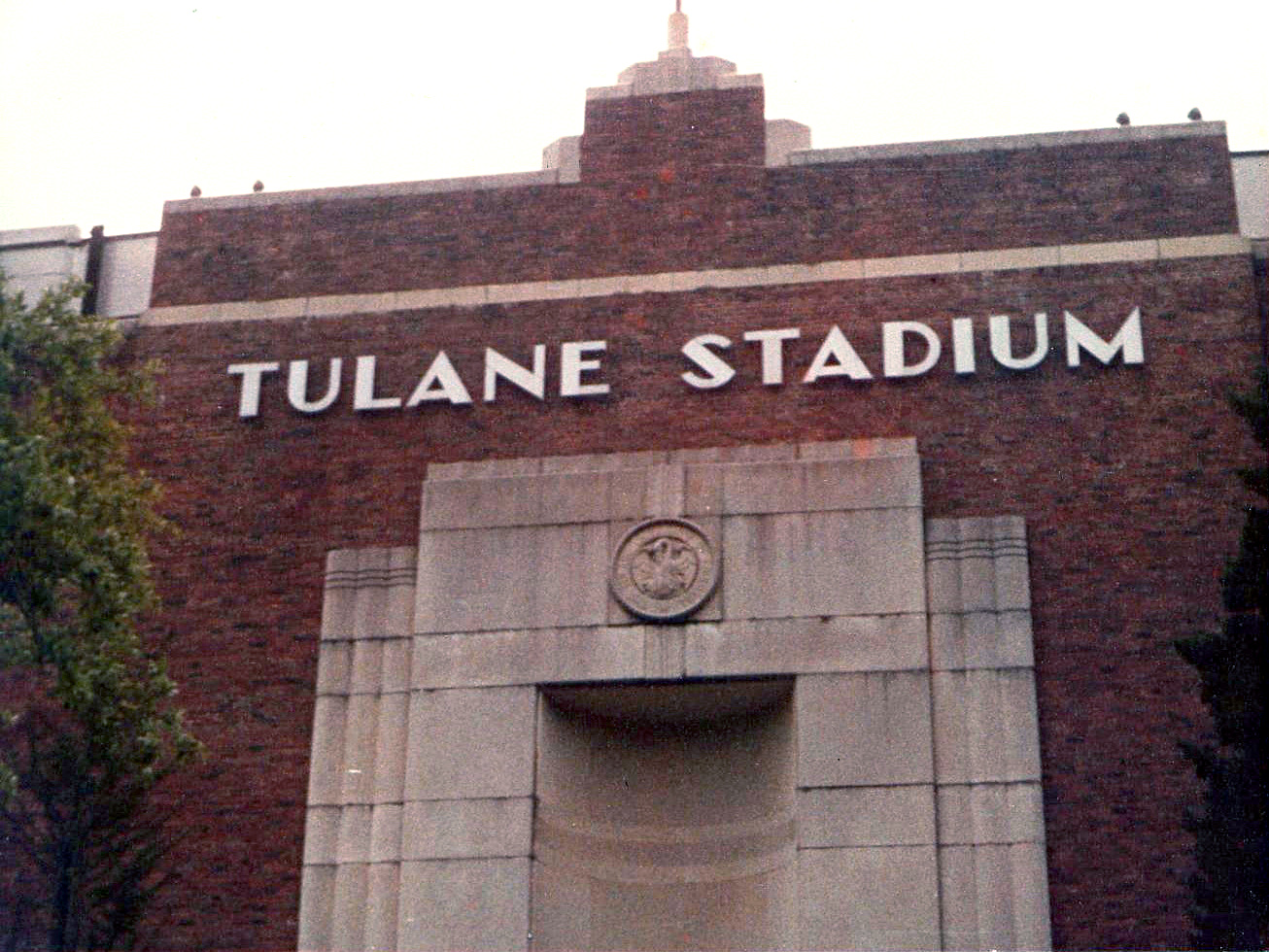
- Tulane Stadium in New Orleans, Louisiana, hosted the Sugar Bowl.
Texas A&M Aggies	Tulane Green Wave
(10–0)	(8–0–1)
SWC	SEC
14	13
Head coach: Homer Norton	Head coach: Red Dawson
AP 1	AP 5
	1	2	3	4	Total
Texas A&M	7	0	0	7	14
Tulane	0	0	7	6	13
- Date: January 1, 1940
- Season: 1939
- Stadium: Tulane Stadium
- Location: New Orleans, Louisiana
- Referee: Ted Arnold
- Attendance: 73,000

The 1940 Sugar Bowl featured the top-ranked Texas A&M Aggies, and the fifth-ranked Tulane Green Wave. The game was played at Tulane's home field, Tulane Stadium.

== Background ==
Texas A&M entered the game with an undefeated record and a ranking of #1 in the AP Poll, having six shutouts while allowing just 18 points the whole year. They entered the polls at #9 prior to their game against TCU on October 21, slowly rising up the ranks to #1 before their match-up against Texas on November 30, whom they shut out 20-0. They finished as champion of the Southwest Conference for the first time in 12 years. Tulane began the years with three wins before a tie to North Carolina that made them go from #4 in the polls to #9. However, they rose back up to #9 with five straight wins, including victories over #14 Ole Miss and #20 Alabama, finishing as co-champion of the Southeastern Conference with Tennessee and Georgia Tech, their first title in five years.

== Game summary ==
Texas A&M took lead in the a first quarter with a 1-yard touchdown run from running back John Kimbrough. He finished the game with 159 yards rushing on 25 carries. In the third quarter, Tulane's Kellogg returned a punt 75 yards for touchdown, tying the game at 7–7. In the third quarter, Tulane's Monnett Butler, former Oak Grove High School star, scored on a 2-yard touchdown run. The extra point attempt was blocked, giving Tulane a 13–7 lead. Kimbrough's second rushing touchdown of the game rallied the Aggies to a 14–13 win.
