= Harley McCollum =

American football player (1916–1984)

No. 46
- Position: Tackle

Personal information
- Born: February 28, 1916; Tulsa, Oklahoma, U.S.
- Died: June 7, 1984 (aged 68); Palm Springs, California, U.S.
- Listed height: 6 ft 4 in (1.93 m)
- Listed weight: 245 lb (111 kg)

Career information
- High school: Wagoner (Wagoner, Oklahoma); Stilwell (Stilwell, Oklahoma)
- College: Tulane (1937–1941)
- NFL draft: 1942: 6th round, 46th overall pick

Career history
- New York Yankees (1946); Chicago Rockets (1947)

Awards and highlights
- Consensus All-American (1939); First-team All-SEC (1939)

Career AAFC statistics
- Games played: 23
- Games started: 9
- Stats at Pro Football Reference

Harley Raymond McCollum (February 28, 1916 – June 7, 1984) was an American professional football tackle in the All-America Football Conference (AAFC) for the New York Yankees and Chicago Rockets. He played college football at Tulane University and was selected in the sixth round of the 1942 NFL draft by the Washington Redskins.
