= 1940 Orange Bowl =

American college football game

- 6th Orange Bowl
- Burdine Stadium in Miami, Florida, hosted the Orange Bowl.
Missouri Tigers	Georgia Tech Yellow Jackets
(8–1)	(7–2)
Big Six	SEC
7	21
Head coach: Don Faurot	Head coach: William Alexander
AP 6	AP 16
	1	2	3	4	Total
Missouri	7	0	0	0	7
Georgia Tech	7	7	7	0	21
- Date: January 1, 1940
- Season: 1939
- Stadium: Burdine Stadium
- Location: Miami, Florida
- Referee: T. G. Kain (SEC; split crew: SEC, Big Six)
- Attendance: 29,278

The 1940 Orange Bowl was a college football postseason bowl game between the Georgia Tech Yellow Jackets and the Missouri Tigers.

== Background ==
The Yellow Jackets tied for first in the Southeastern Conference, their first conference title since winning the Southern Conference in 1928, which was also their last bowl appearance. Missouri won the Missouri Valley Intercollegiate Athletic Association title for the first time since 1927. This was Missouri's first bowl game since 1924.

== Game summary ==
Paul Christman gave the Tigers a 7–0 lead on his touchdown plunge, but Howard Ector responded with a touchdown run of his own to culminate a 63-yard drive and tie the score at 7 at the end of one quarter. Rob Ison dashed for the second Jacket touchdown to make it 14–7. Earl Wheby made it 21–7 on his touchdown gallop of 34 yards as Georgia Tech won their first Orange Bowl.

== Aftermath ==
The Yellow Jackets have made six subsequent appearances in the over 70-year span since this game, including three in the next 12 years. The Tigers returned to the Orange Bowl 20 years later.

== Statistics ==
Statistics	Georgia Tech	Missouri
First downs	12	14
Rushing yards	210	151
Passing yards	91	60
Total offense	301	211
Interceptions	1	1
Punt average	35.0	33.0
Fumbles lost	3	1
Penalty yards	36	15
