= Ralph Wenzel (end) =

American football player (1918–2001)

No. 22
- Position: End

Personal information
- Born: July 22, 1918; Ferda, Arkansas, U.S.
- Died: November 6, 2001 (aged 83); Lexington, Kentucky, U.S.
- Listed height: 6 ft 0 in (1.83 m)
- Listed weight: 205 lb (93 kg)

Career information
- College: Tulane
- NFL draft: 1940: 2nd round, 12th overall pick

Career history
- Pittsburgh Steelers (1942)

Awards and highlights
- Third-team All-American (1939); 3× Second-team All-SEC (1937, 1938, 1939)
- Stats at Pro Football Reference

Ralph Milton Wenzel (July 22, 1918 – November 6, 2001) was an American football player and officer in the United States Marine Corps. He was a first-team All-American at Tulane University in 1939, playing at the end position. He later played for the Pittsburgh Steelers in the National Football League (NFL) during the 1942 season while awaiting assignment to active duty in the Marine Corps.

== Early life ==
Wenzel was born in the town of Ferda, Arkansas, located to the southeast of Little Rock, and grew up in Dudley Lake, Jefferson County, Arkansas. His father, Frank H. Wenzel, was a Georgia native who was employed as a bookkeeper at a department store.

== Tulane University ==
Wenzel attended Tulane University in New Orleans, Louisiana, and played college football at the end position for the Tulane Green Wave football team. He was selected by the Associated Press as a second-team all-SEC player in 1938. The following year, he was selected by the Central Press Association (CP) and the New York Sun as a first-team player on the 1939 College Football All-America Team. Wenzel also participated in Glee Club, A Capella Choir, and The Bardics while attending Tulane.

== Coaching and professional football ==
Wenzel was drafted by the Pittsburgh Steelers in the second round with the 12th overall pick in the 1940 NFL draft. He initially opted to pursue a career in coaching rather than playing professional football. In January 1940, he was appointed as the ends coach at Tulane. After spending the 1940 season as the ends coach at Tulane, Wenzel spent the 1941 season as the assistant football coach at Greenville High School in Greenville, Mississippi. In the summer of 1942, Wenzel resigned from his position at Greenville High School to enlist in the United States Marine Corps. After being told not to report until December 1942, Wenzel signed a contract to play professional football with the Steelers. He appeared in six games for the Steelers during the 1942 NFL season.

== Later life ==
Wenzel had served in the Marine Corps reserve since 1938 and began active duty in December 1942, reporting for officer training at the Marine Corps school at Quantico, Virginia. He served in the military for several years thereafter, attaining the rank of major in 1954.

Wenzel died in 2001 in Lexington, Kentucky, at age 83.
