= Robert Neyland =

American football player, coach, and US Army officer (1892–1962)

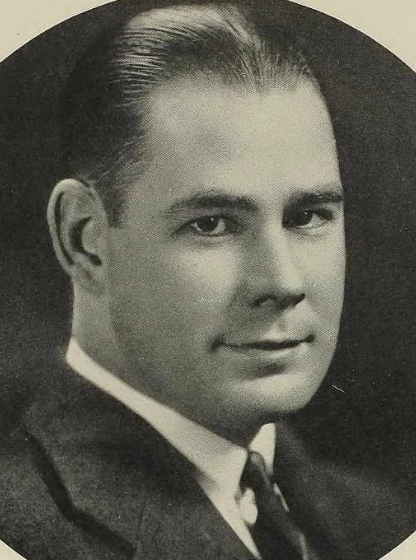
- Neyland from the 1940 Volunteer

Biographical details
- Born: February 17, 1892; Greenville, Texas, U.S.
- Died: March 28, 1962 (aged 70); New Orleans, Louisiana, U.S.

Playing career
- 1913–1916: Army
- Position: Lineman

Coaching career (HC unless noted)
- 1919–1924: Army (assistant)
- 1925: Tennessee (assistant)
- 1926–1934: Tennessee
- 1936–1940: Tennessee
- 1946–1952: Tennessee

Administrative career (AD unless noted)
- 1936–1941: Tennessee
- 1946–1962: Tennessee

Head coaching record
- Overall: 173–31–12
- Bowls: 2–5

Accomplishments and honors

Championships
- As coach: 4x National (1938, 1940, 1950, 1951); 2× SoCon (1927, 1932); 5× SEC (1938–1940, 1946, 1951); As player: National (1914)

Awards
- Amos Alonzo Stagg Award (1957); 4× SEC Coach of the Year (1936, 1938, 1950, 1951)
- College Football Hall of Fame; Inducted in 1956 (profile)

Robert Reese Neyland (KNEE-lənd; February 17, 1892 – March 28, 1962) was an American football player and coach and officer in the United States Army, reaching the rank of brigadier general. He served three stints as the head football coach at the University of Tennessee from 1926 to 1934, 1936 to 1940, and 1946 to 1952. He is one of two college football coaches to have won national titles in two non-consecutive tenures at the same school, along with Frank Leahy of the University of Notre Dame. Neyland holds the record for most wins in Tennessee Volunteers history with 173 wins in 216 games, six undefeated seasons, nine undefeated regular seasons, seven conference championships, and four claimed national championships. At UT, he reeled off undefeated streaks of 33, 28, 23, 19, and 14 games.

Neyland is often referred to as one of the best, if not the best, defensive football coaches ever. Sports Illustrated named Neyland as the defensive coordinator of its all-century college football team in its "Best of the 20th Century" edition. 112 of his victories came via shutout. In 1938 and 1939, Neyland's Vols set NCAA records when they shut out 17 straight regular season opponents for 71 consecutive shutout quarters. His 1939 squad is the last NCAA team in history to hold every regular season opponent scoreless.

Neyland was also an innovator. He is credited with being the first coach to utilize sideline telephones and game film to study opponents. His teams also were some of the first to wear lightweight pads and tearaway jerseys. Such measures increased his players' elusiveness and exemplify Neyland's "speed over strength" philosophy. Neyland is also famous for creating the seven "Game Maxims" of football that many coaches, on all levels, still use. Tennessee players recite the maxims before every game in the locker room as a team.

Neyland Stadium is not only named for The General, but its present form was designed by him. The plans he drew up for a major expansion shortly before his death formed the basis for all expansions that brought the stadium to its modern size with an over 100,000 seat capacity. Neyland was inducted into the College Football Hall of Fame as a coach in 1956.

On November 12, 2010, a 9-foot (2.7 m), nearly 1,500-pound (680 kg) bronze statue of General Neyland was unveiled between gates 15A and 17 at Neyland Stadium. The statue, which was commissioned by artist Blair Buswell, is twice life-size. Since Neyland is portrayed in the kneeling position rather than standing, the statue is 9 feet (2.7 m) tall (a standing statue would have stood 12 feet (3.7 m) tall). The base is 57 by 87 inches (140 by 220 cm) and features Neyland's well-known seven Game Maxims engraved into the precast.

== Early life, playing career, and education ==
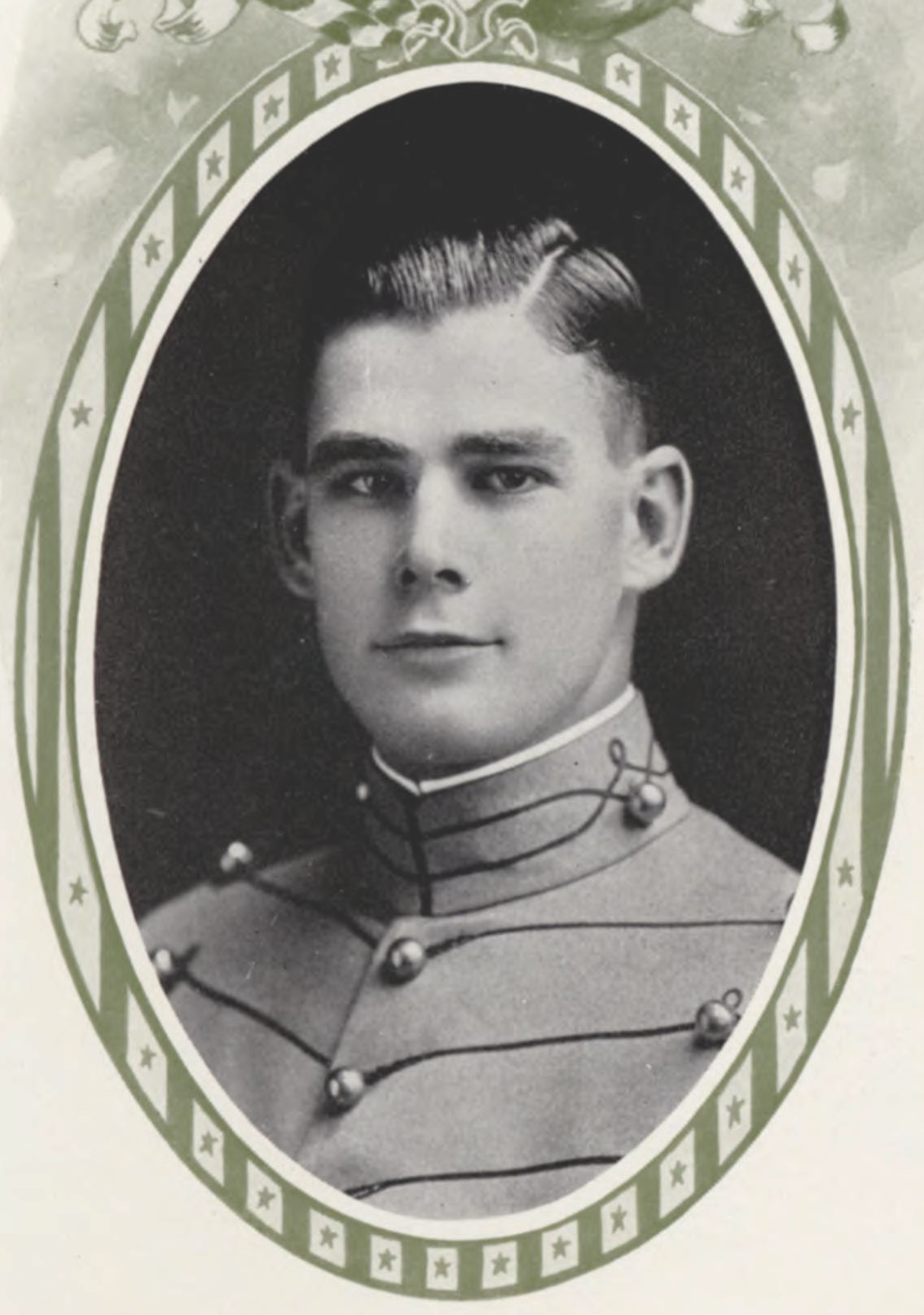
At West Point in 1916

Born in Greenville, Texas, Neyland attended Burleson Junior College in his home town for a year. He transferred to Texas A&M University for a year before receiving an appointment to the United States Military Academy at West Point, New York from Congressman Sam Rayburn. At West Point, Neyland starred as a lineman in football and a pitcher in baseball, throwing the program's first no-hitter and was the academy boxing champion three consecutive years. The National League baseball New York Giants offered him a $3,500 contract (equivalent to $100,000 in 2024), which he turned down.

Neyland graduated, 28th in a class of 125, from West Point in June 1916. He was commissioned as an officer in the United States Army Corps of Engineers and served in France during World War I. After the war, he attended Massachusetts Institute of Technology (MIT) for a graduate degree in engineering before returning to West Point as aide-de-camp to Superintendent Douglas MacArthur.

== Coaching career ==
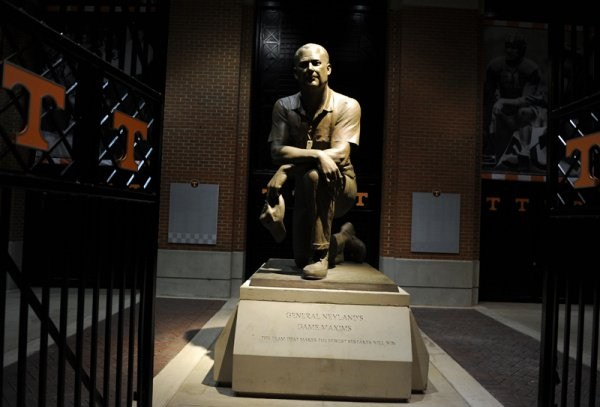
Statue of Robert Neyland on display at Neyland Stadium

Wanting to continue coaching, Captain Neyland was appointed Professor of Military Science at the University of Tennessee (UTK) in 1925. After one season as an assistant to head coach M. B. Banks, Neyland was named head coach and athletic director by chairman of the UTK Athletic Council Nathan W. Dougherty in 1926. He coached the team for nine years before the Army called him to active duty for one year in Panama. During that first nine-year stint with the Vols, Neyland had five undefeated seasons, all within a six-year period (1927, 1928, 1929, 1931, and 1932). The Vols reeled off undefeated streaks of 33 and 28 straight games. Upon returning stateside from the Panama Canal Zone, he returned to UTK as head coach.

Neyland's 1938 team went undefeated and was proclaimed national champion by several minor outlets. His 1939 squad is notable for being the last college football team to go an entire regular season unscored upon, shutting out every opponent; his team was then shut out by USC in the Rose Bowl. From November 5, 1938, to December 9, 1939, the Vols ran off 17 straight shutouts and 71 consecutive shutout quarters—records that have never been seriously threatened. Neyland completed another undefeated regular season in 1940 before falling in the Sugar Bowl to Boston College.

He was recalled to military service again in 1941. In fall 1942, Neyland was appointed as head coach of an Eastern All-Army team that took on National Football League clubs to raise money for the Army Emergency Relief fund. The Eastern All-Army played three games, defeating the New York Giants and Brooklyn Dodgers, but lost to the defending NFL champion Chicago Bears. Along with the Western All-Army team led by Duke University's Wallace Wade, the games raised $241,392.29 for the fund.

In World War II, Neyland served in the China-Burma-India Theater, supervising the transportation of materiel through monsoons and across the Himalayas to the troops commanded by General "Vinegar" Joe Stillwell. During his military career he was awarded the Distinguished Service Medal and the Legion of Merit and made a member of the Order of the British Empire.

He retired from military service a second time, in 1946, with the rank of brigadier general, and again returned to the Vols as coach through 1952. After producing mediocre teams in the late forties, many thought that the General had lost his touch, as more teams moved toward the "T formation" and Neyland continued running the single wing. Neyland was vindicated, however, as he ended his career with a flourish. His 1950 team was crowned national champion by several minor outlets, while his 1951 team won the school's first undisputed national championship, the first year the Volunteers ended a season ranked first in either the AP or UPI poll. He coached his final season in 1952, leading the Vols to a 8–2–1 record. He remained as athletic director at the university until his death in New Orleans on March 28, 1962.

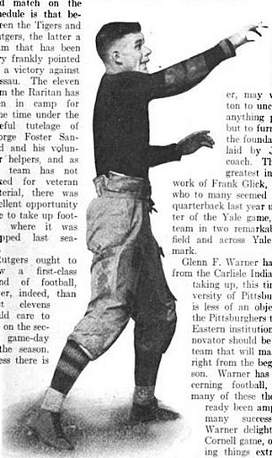
Neyland at Army tossing a pass

Shortly before his death, Neyland drew up plans for a major expansion and renovation to the Vols' home stadium, Shields–Watkins Field. When he had arrived in Knoxville in 1925, Shields–Watkins Field seated only 3,200 people—barely a fraction of the capacity of Vanderbilt's Dudley Field. Reflecting the Vols' rise to national prominence under his watch, the stadium's capacity had jumped to over 46,000 seats—an over 14-fold increase—in the 36 years since then. UT renamed the stadium Neyland Stadium in his honor prior to the 1962 season, and the plans he drew up were so far ahead of their time that they have been used as the basis for every major expansion since then.

== Family ==
Tombstone of General Neyland at Knoxville National Cemetery

On July 16, 1923, Neyland married Ada "Peggy" Fitch (September 1, 1897 – March 7, 1976) of Grand Rapids, Michigan. They had met while she was visiting friends at the academy. Ada was the daughter of Charles Lewis Fitch (July 24, 1845 – September 8, 1930) and Mary S. (June 1853 – ?). They had two sons, Robert Jr., born February 11, 1930, and Lewis, December 6, 1933 — 2013. General Neyland was the son of lawyer Robert Reece Neyland Sr. (October 1859 – 1935) and Pauline Lewis Neyland (January 1861 – December 1932). His siblings were sister Carroll M. Neyland (January 1890 – 1965) and brother Mayo W. Neyland (March 1896 – November 1969). Both General Neyland and Ada are buried in Knoxville National Cemetery.

== Neyland Scholarship ==
In late 1961, Neyland began working on a plan for supporters of UT athletic teams to show their interest in UT's academic programs by offering scholarships to attract outstanding student scholars to the university. General Neyland himself was an outstanding scholar, as well as an athlete during his college days at West Point. It was the General's dream that the university offer four-year academic merit scholarships to students who possessed outstanding academic and leadership qualities.

Following Neyland's death in early 1962, Dr. Andrew D. Holt, then UT president, announced that a nationwide campaign would be launched to raise a minimum of $100,000 to establish the Robert R. Neyland Scholarship Fund. In October 1962, at half-time of the UT vs. Alabama game, 165 women representing UT's sororities collected more than $10,000 in a 15-minute time period at Neyland Stadium to launch the effort. By the end of fall 1962, more than $65,000 had been committed to the Neyland Scholarship fund. In the spring of 1963, a decision was made that proceeds from the annual Orange and White spring football game would go to help build the Neyland Scholarship Fund.

The first Neyland Scholarships were awarded in 1963. The first two recipients were Melissa Ann Baker of Maryville, Tennessee (now Ann Baker Furrow, a former member of the UT Board of Trustees) and Robert English Allen of Columbia, Tennessee.

== Seven Maxims of Football ==
During the 1930s, Neyland began having his teams recite seven sentences that he felt summarized everything it took to win a game. These came to be known as "the Seven Maxims of Football", or "the Seven Game Maxims."

- The team that makes the fewest mistakes will win.
- Play for and make the breaks and when one comes your way – SCORE.
- If at first the game – or the breaks – go against you, don't let up... put on more steam.
- Protect our kickers, our QB, our lead and our ball game.
- Ball, oskie, cover, block, cut and slice, pursue and gang tackle... for this is the WINNING EDGE.
- Press the kicking game. Here is where the breaks are made.
- Carry the fight to our opponent and keep it there for 60 minutes.

== Head coaching record ==
Year	Team	Overall	Conference	Standing	Bowl/playoffs	Coaches^{#}	AP^{°}
Tennessee Volunteers (Southern Conference) (1926–1932)
1926	Tennessee	8–1	5–1	2nd			
1927	Tennessee	8–0–1	5–0–1	T–1st			
1928	Tennessee	9–0–1	6–0–1	2nd			
1929	Tennessee	9–0–1	6–0–1	2nd			
1930	Tennessee	9–1	6–1	3rd			
1931	Tennessee	9–0–1	6–0–1	2nd			
1932	Tennessee	9–0–1	7–0–1	T–1st			
Tennessee Volunteers (Southeastern Conference) (1933–1934)
1933	Tennessee	7–3	5–2	4th			
1934	Tennessee	8–2	5–1	3rd			
Tennessee Volunteers (Southeastern Conference) (1936–1940)
1936	Tennessee	6–2–2	3–1–2	4th			17
1937	Tennessee	6–3–1	4–3	7th			
1938	Tennessee	11–0	7–0	1st	W Orange		2
1939	Tennessee	10–1	6–0	T–1st	L Rose		2
1940	Tennessee	10–1	5–0	1st	L Sugar		4
Tennessee Volunteers (Southeastern Conference) (1946–1952)
1946	Tennessee	9–2	5–0	T–1st	L Orange		7
1947	Tennessee	5–5	2–3	T–9th			
1948	Tennessee	4–4–2	2–3–1	8th			
1949	Tennessee	7–2–1	4–1–1	3rd			17
1950	Tennessee	11–1	4–1	2nd	W Cotton	3	4
1951	Tennessee	10–1	5–0	T–1st	L Sugar	1	1
1952	Tennessee	8–2–1	5–0–1	2nd	L Cotton	8	8
Tennessee:		173–31–12	103–17–10				
Total:		173–31–12					
National championship Conference title Conference division title or championship game berth
^{#}Rankings from final Coaches Poll.; ^{°}Rankings from final AP Poll.

== See also ==
- List of college football career coaching winning percentage leaders
- List of college football head coaches with non-consecutive tenure
