= Williamson System =

The Williamson System was a mathematical system used to rank college football teams. The system was created by Paul B. Williamson, a geologist and member of the Sugar Bowl committee.

The NCAA college football records book includes the Williamson System as a "major selector" of national championships for the years 1932-1963.

Paul Williamson died in 1955. His son Mitch Williamson subsequently took up his father's syndicated column for the 1955–1963 seasons.

== National champions ==
The following teams were ranked No. 1 by the Williamson System for the 1932–1963 college football seasons.

The NCAA Football Bowl Subdivision Records book contains five apparent errors in its listing of Williamson System champions. The following table contains the contemporary champions syndicated by Paul Williamson. The NCAA record book's errors are documented in the Notes column.

Season	Champion	Record	Coach	Notes
1932	USC	10–0	Howard Jones	
1933	USC	10–1–1	Howard Jones	
1934	Alabama	10–0	Frank Thomas	
1935	TCU	12–1	Dutch Meyer	
1936	Minnesota	7–1	Bernie Bierman	
1937	California	10–0–1	Stub Allison	
1938	TCU	11–0	Dutch Meyer	
1938	Tennessee	11–0	Robert Neyland	
1939	Texas A&M	11–0	Homer Norton	
1940	Stanford	10–0	Clark Shaughnessy	
1941	Texas	8–1–1	Dana X. Bible	
1942	Georgia	10–1	Wally Butts	
1943	Notre Dame	9–1	Frank Leahy	
1944	Army	9–0	Earl Blaik	
1945	Army	9–0	Earl Blaik	
1946	Georgia	11–0	Wally Butts	
1947	Notre Dame	9–0	Frank Leahy	
1948	Michigan	9–0	Bennie Oosterbaan	
1949	Notre Dame	10–0	Frank Leahy	
1950	Oklahoma	10–1	Bud Wilkinson	
1951	Tennessee	10–1	Robert Neyland	
1952	Michigan State	9–0	Biggie Munn	
1953	Notre Dame	9–0–1	Frank Leahy	
1954	Ohio State	10–0	Woody Hayes	
1955	Oklahoma	11–0	Bud Wilkinson	
1956	Oklahoma	10–0	Bud Wilkinson	
1957	Auburn	10–0	Ralph Jordan	
1958	LSU	11–0	Paul Dietzel	
1959	Syracuse	11–0	Ben Schwartzwalder	
1960	Ole Miss	10–0–1	Johnny Vaught	
1961	Alabama	11–0	Bear Bryant	
1962	USC	11–0	John McKay	
1963	Texas	11–0	Darrell Royal	
