= List of Louisville Cardinals football seasons =

Annual results of the Louisville Cardinals football team.

== Year-by-year results ==
Year	Team	Overall	Conference	Standing	Bowl/playoffs	Coaches^{#}	AP^{°}
Lester Larson (Independent) (1912–1913)
1912	Louisville	3–1					
1913	Louisville	5–1					
Bruce Baker (Independent) (1914)
1914	Louisville	1–4					
Will Duffy (Independent) (1915–1916)
1915	Louisville	1–5–1					
1916	Louisville	2–3–1					
1917–20	No team						
Bill Duncan (Independent) (1921–1922)
1921	Louisville	2–2–1					
1922	Louisville	2–7					
Fred Enke (Independent) (1923–1924)
1923	Louisville	5–3					
1924	Louisville	3–5–1					
Tom King (Independent) (1925–1930)
1925	Louisville	8–0					
Tom King (Southern Intercollegiate Athletic Association) (1926–1930)
1926	Louisville	6–2	2–1	T–11th			
1927	Louisville	4–4	2–2	T–9th			
1928	Louisville	1–7	0–4	29th			
1929	Louisville	3–5	1–3	T–22nd			
1930	Louisville	5–3	2–2	T–13th			
Jack McGrath (Southern Intercollegiate Athletic Association) (1931)
1931	Louisville	0–8	0–5	32nd			
C. V. Money (Southern Intercollegiate Athletic Association) (1932)
1932	Louisville	0–9	0–5	27th			
Ben Cregor (Southern Intercollegiate Athletic Association) (1933–1935)
1933	Louisville	1–7	1–6	28th			
1934	Louisville	2–5	2–3	T–20th			
1935	Louisville	1–6–1	1–4	T–26th			
Laurie Apitz (Southern Intercollegiate Athletic Association) (1936–1941)
1936	Louisville	4–4	2–3	T–20th			
1937	Louisville	2–5–1	1–3–1	T–23rd			
1938	Louisville	2–6	0–3	T–29th			
1939	Louisville	5–2–1	1–1–1	T–14th			
1940	Louisville	3–5–1	0–2	T–28th			
1941	Louisville	4–4	1–1	T–14th			
Laurie Apitz (Independent) (1942)
1942	Louisville	2–3					
1943–45	No team						
Frank Camp (Kentucky Intercollegiate Athletic Conference) (1946–1947)
1946	Louisville	6–2	2–2	4th			
1947	Louisville	7–0–1	2–0	T–1st			
Frank Camp (Ohio Valley Conference) (1948)
1948	Louisville	5–5	1–1	T–3rd			
Frank Camp (Independent) (1949–1962)
1949	Louisville	8–3					
1950	Louisville	3–6–1					
1951	Louisville	5–4					
1952	Louisville	3–5					
1953	Louisville	1–7					
1954	Louisville	3–6					
1955	Louisville	7–2					
1956	Louisville	6–3					
1957	Louisville	9–1			W Sun		
1958	Louisville	4–4					
1959	Louisville	6–4					
1960	Louisville	7–2					
1961	Louisville	6–3					
1962	Louisville	6–4					
Frank Camp (Missouri Valley Conference) (1963–1968)
1963	Louisville	3–7	1–3	5th			
1964	Louisville	1–9	0–4	5th			
1965	Louisville	6–4	3–1	2nd			
1966	Louisville	6–4	1–3	T–4th			
1967	Louisville	5–5	1–3	4th			
1968	Louisville	5–5	2–3	T–4th			
Lee Corso (Missouri Valley Conference) (1969–1972)
1969	Louisville	5–4–1	2–3	T–3rd			
1970	Louisville	8–3–1	4–0	1st	T Pasadena		
1971	Louisville	6–3–1	3–2	T–2nd			
1972	Louisville	9–1	4–1	T–1st		16	18
T. W. Alley (Missouri Valley Conference) (1973–1974)
1973	Louisville	5–6	3–2	T–3rd			
1974	Louisville	3–7	3–2	2nd			
Vince Gibson (Independent) (1975–1979)
1975	Louisville	2–9					
1976	Louisville	5–6					
1977	Louisville	7–4–1			L Independence		
1978	Louisville	7–4					
1979	Louisville	4–6–1					
Bob Weber (Independent) (1980–1984)
1980	Louisville	5–6					
1981	Louisville	5–6					
1982	Louisville	5–6					
1983	Louisville	3–8					
1984	Louisville	2–9					
Howard Schnellenberger (Independent) (1985–1994)
1985	Louisville	2–9					
1986	Louisville	3–8					
1987	Louisville	3–7–1					
1988	Louisville	8–3					
1989	Louisville	6–5					
1990	Louisville	10–1–1			W Fiesta	12	14
1991	Louisville	2–9					
1992	Louisville	5–6					
1993	Louisville	9–3			W Liberty	23	24
1994	Louisville	6–5					
Ron Cooper (Independent) (1995)
1995	Louisville	7–4					
Ron Cooper (Conference USA) (1996–1997)
1996	Louisville	5–6	2–3	T–3rd			
1997	Louisville	1–10	0–6	7th			
John L. Smith (Conference USA) (1998–2002)
1998	Louisville	7–5	4–2	3rd	L Motor City		
1999	Louisville	7–5	4–2	T–2nd	L Humanitarian		
2000	Louisville	9–3	6–1	1st	L Liberty		
2001	Louisville	11–2	6–1	1st	W Liberty	16	17
2002	Louisville	7–6	5–3	3rd	L GMAC		
Bobby Petrino (Conference USA) (2003–2004)
2003	Louisville	9–4	5–3	T–3rd	L GMAC		
2004	Louisville	11–1	8–0	1st	W Liberty	7	6
Bobby Petrino (Big East Conference) (2005–2006)
2005	Louisville	9–3	5–2	2nd	L Gator	20	19
2006	Louisville	12–1	6–1	1st	W Orange^{†}	7	6
Steve Kragthorpe (Big East Conference) (2007–2009)
2007	Louisville	6–6	3–4	T–5th			
2008	Louisville	5–7	1–6	8th			
2009	Louisville	4–8	1–6	7th			
Charlie Strong (Big East Conference) (2010–2012)
2010	Louisville	7–6	3–4	T–5th	W Beef 'O' Brady's		
2011	Louisville	7–6	5–2	T–1st	L Belk		
2012	Louisville	11–2	5–2	T–1st	W Sugar^{†}	13	13
Charlie Strong (American Athletic Conference) (2013)
2013	Louisville	12–1	7–1	2nd	W Russell Athletic	15	15
Bobby Petrino (Atlantic Coast Conference) (2014–2018)
2014	Louisville	9–4	5–3	3rd (Atlantic)	L Belk	24	24
2015	Louisville	8–5	5–3	3rd (Atlantic)	W Music City		
2016	Louisville	9–4	7–1	T–1st (Atlantic)	L Citrus	20	21
2017	Louisville	8–5	4–4	T–3rd (Atlantic)	L TaxSlayer		
2018	Louisville (Note: The Cardinals were led by head coach Bobby Petrino until he was fired on November 11 after starting the season 2–8. Lorenzo Ward was the interim head coach for the remainder of the season.)	2–10	0–8	7th (Atlantic)			
Scott Satterfield (Atlantic Coast Conference) (2019–2022)
2019	Louisville	8–5	5–3	2nd (Atlantic)	W Music City		
2020	Louisville	4–7	3–7	12th			
2021	Louisville	6–7	4–4	T–4th (Atlantic)	L First Responder		
2022	Louisville (Note: Deion Branch served as interim head coach for Louisville's appearance in the 2022 Fenway Bowl, following the departure of Scott Satterfield at the end of the regular season to accept a different position.)	8–5	4–4	T–3rd (Atlantic)	W Fenway		
Jeff Brohm (Atlantic Coast Conference) (2023–present)
2023	Louisville	10–4	7–1	2nd	L Holiday	18	19
2024	Louisville	9–4	5–3	T–4th	W Sun		
2025	Louisville	9–4	4–4	T–8th	W Boca Raton		
Total:		568–505–17 (.529)					
National championship Conference title Conference division title or championship game berth
^{†}Indicates Bowl Coalition, Bowl Alliance, BCS, or CFP / New Years' Six bowl.; ^{#}Rankings from final Coaches Poll.
