= Apitz =

Apitz is a surname. Notable people with this surname include:

- Bruno Apitz (1900–1979), German writer and survivor of the Buchenwald concentration camp
- Laurie Apitz (1906–1980), American American football player and coach
- Willy Apitz, recipient of the Knight's Cross of the Iron Cross
