= Larry Mullins =

Larry Mullins may refer to:

- Larry Mullins (American football), American college football player, coach and athletic director
- Larry Mullins (musician), American musician, record producer, and composer

== See also ==
- Larry Mullen Jr., Irish musician
