= 1939 West Tennessee State Teachers Tigers football team =

American college football season

1939 West Tennessee State Teachers Tigers football
- Conference: Southern Intercollegiate Athletic Association
- Record: 3–8 (3–4 SIAA)
- Head coach: Cecil C. Humphreys (1st season)
- Home stadium: Crump Stadium

1939 Southern Intercollegiate Athletic Association football standings
	Conf.					Overall
Team	W		L		T	W		L		T
Louisiana Normal $	7	–	0	–	0	11	–	0	–	0
Tennessee Tech	4	–	0	–	0	6	–	3	–	1
Mississippi College	3	–	0	–	0	6	–	1	–	1
Miami (FL)	2	–	0	–	0	5	–	5	–	0
Rollins	5	–	1	–	0	10	–	1	–	0
Western Kentucky State Teachers	5	–	1	–	1	7	–	1	–	1
Mississippi State Teachers	4	–	1	–	0	4	–	2	–	3
Murray State	4	–	1	–	1	4	–	4	–	1
Newberry	3	–	1	–	1	4	–	1	–	4
Presbyterian	3	–	1	–	2	4	–	3	–	2
Georgetown (KY)	2	–	1	–	1	4	–	4	–	1
Eastern Kentucky	3	–	2	–	0	6	–	3	–	0
Union (TN)	3	–	2	–	0	7	–	2	–	0
Morehead State	2	–	2	–	0	6	–	2	–	0
Louisville	1	–	1	–	1	5	–	2	–	1
Union (KY)	1	–	1	–	1	3	–	3	–	1
Oglethorpe	3	–	3	–	1	3	–	4	–	1
Centre	1	–	1	–	1	1	–	5	–	2
Centenary	1	–	1	–	0	2	–	9	–	1
Louisiana Tech	3	–	4	–	0	5	–	6	–	0
West Tennessee State Teachers	3	–	4	–	0	3	–	8	–	0
Troy State	2	–	3	–	0	7	–	4	–	0
SW Louisiana	2	–	3	–	0	3	–	5	–	1
Stetson	2	–	4	–	2	3	–	5	–	2
Louisiana College	2	–	5	–	0	4	–	6	–	1
Middle Tennessee State Teachers	1	–	5	–	1	1	–	6	–	1
Erskine	1	–	5	–	0	1	–	9	–	0
Delta State	1	–	6	–	0	1	–	9	–	0
Wofford	0	–	2	–	3	1	–	5	–	3
Tampa	0	–	3	–	1	2	–	7	–	1
Jacksonville State	0	–	3	–	1	0	–	8	–	2
Transylvania	0	–	7	–	0	1	–	8	–	0
Emory and Henry	0	–	0	–	0	7	–	2	–	0
$ – Conference champion

The 1939 West Tennessee State Teachers Tigers football team was an American football team that represented the West Tennessee State Teachers College (now known as the University of Memphis) as a member of the Southern Intercollegiate Athletic Association during the 1939 college football season. In their first season under head coach Cecil C. Humphreys, West Tennessee State Teachers compiled a 3–8 record.

West Tennessee was ranked at No. 313 (out of 609 teams) in the final Litkenhous Ratings for 1939.

== Schedule ==
Date	Opponent	Site	Result	Attendance	Source
September 23	at Louisiana College	Alumni Field; Pineville, LA	L 15–19		
September 29	Arkansas State*	Crump Stadium; Memphis, TN (rivalry)	L 6–7		
October 6	at Union (TN)	Rothrock Field; Jackson, TN	L 12–13		
October 13	at Middle Tennessee State Teachers	Horace Jones Field; Murfreesboro, TN	W 25–6	2,500	
October 21	Western Kentucky State Teachers*	Crump Stadium; Memphis, TN	L 0–12		
October 28	Tennessee Tech	Crump Stadium; Memphis, TN	L 0–15		
November 3	at Troy State	Wiregrass Stadium; Dothan, AL	W 13–7	1,500	
November 11	Delta State	Crump Stadium; Memphis, TN	W 7–0		
October 18	at Ole Miss*	Hemingway Stadium; Oxford, MS (rivalry)	L 7–46	4,000	
November 25	Millsaps*	Crump Stadium; Memphis, TN	L 0–2	400	
December 2	vs. Southwestern (TN)*	Crump Stadium; Memphis, TN	L 0–32	3,000	
*Non-conference game
