= 1939 Mississippi State Teachers Yellow Jackets football team =

American college football season

1939 Mississippi State Teachers Yellow Jackets football
- Conference: Southern Intercollegiate Athletic Association
- Record: 4–2–3 (4–1 SIAA)
- Head coach: Reed Green (3rd season)
- Home stadium: Faulkner Field

1939 Southern Intercollegiate Athletic Association football standings
	Conf.					Overall
Team	W		L		T	W		L		T
Louisiana Normal $	7	–	0	–	0	11	–	0	–	0
Tennessee Tech	4	–	0	–	0	6	–	3	–	1
Mississippi College	3	–	0	–	0	6	–	1	–	1
Miami (FL)	2	–	0	–	0	5	–	5	–	0
Rollins	5	–	1	–	0	10	–	1	–	0
Western Kentucky State Teachers	5	–	1	–	1	7	–	1	–	1
Mississippi State Teachers	4	–	1	–	0	4	–	2	–	3
Murray State	4	–	1	–	1	4	–	4	–	1
Newberry	3	–	1	–	1	4	–	1	–	4
Presbyterian	3	–	1	–	2	4	–	3	–	2
Georgetown (KY)	2	–	1	–	1	4	–	4	–	1
Eastern Kentucky	3	–	2	–	0	6	–	3	–	0
Union (TN)	3	–	2	–	0	7	–	2	–	0
Morehead State	2	–	2	–	0	6	–	2	–	0
Louisville	1	–	1	–	1	5	–	2	–	1
Union (KY)	1	–	1	–	1	3	–	3	–	1
Oglethorpe	3	–	3	–	1	3	–	4	–	1
Centre	1	–	1	–	1	1	–	5	–	2
Centenary	1	–	1	–	0	2	–	9	–	1
Louisiana Tech	3	–	4	–	0	5	–	6	–	0
West Tennessee State Teachers	3	–	4	–	0	3	–	8	–	0
Troy State	2	–	3	–	0	7	–	4	–	0
SW Louisiana	2	–	3	–	0	3	–	5	–	1
Stetson	2	–	4	–	2	3	–	5	–	2
Louisiana College	2	–	5	–	0	4	–	6	–	1
Middle Tennessee State Teachers	1	–	5	–	1	1	–	6	–	1
Erskine	1	–	5	–	0	1	–	9	–	0
Delta State	1	–	6	–	0	1	–	9	–	0
Wofford	0	–	2	–	3	1	–	5	–	3
Tampa	0	–	3	–	1	2	–	7	–	1
Jacksonville State	0	–	3	–	1	0	–	8	–	2
Transylvania	0	–	7	–	0	1	–	8	–	0
Emory and Henry	0	–	0	–	0	7	–	2	–	0
$ – Conference champion

The 1939 Mississippi State Teachers Yellow Jackets football team was an American football team that represented the Mississippi State Teachers College (now known as the University of Southern Mississippi) as a member of the Southern Intercollegiate Athletic Association during the 1939 college football season. In their third year under head coach Reed Green, the team compiled a 4–2–3 record.

Mississippi State Teachers was ranked at No. 183 (out of 609 teams) in the final Litkenhous Ratings for 1939.

== Schedule ==
Date	Opponent	Site	Result	Attendance	Source
September 30	Troy State	Faulkner Field; Hattiesburg, MS	W 13–6		
October 7	at Sam Houston State*	Pritchett Field; Huntsville, TX	T 7–7		
October 14	at Millsaps*	Jackson, MS	T 0–0		
October 21	at Delta State	Delta Field; Cleveland, MS	W 21–0		
November 4	Louisiana College^{†}	Faulkner Field; Hattiesburg, MS	W 7–0	3,000	
November 11	No. 19 Ole Miss*	Faulkner Field; Hattiesburg, MS	L 7–27		
November 19	at Southwestern Louisiana	Campus Athletic Field; Lafayette, LA	W 9–7	5,000	
November 23	Louisiana Normal	Faulkner Field; Hattiesburg, MS	L 0–7		
December 1	St. Mary's (TX)*	Faulkner Field; Hattiesburg, MS	T 13–13		
*Non-conference game; ^{†}Homecoming; Rankings from AP Poll released prior to the game
