= 1939 Troy State Red Wave football team =

American college football season

1939 Troy State Red Wave football

AIC champion
- Conference: Alabama Intercollegiate Conference, Southern Intercollegiate Athletic Association
- Record: 7–4 (3–0 AIC, 2–3 SIAA)
- Head coach: Albert Choate (3rd season)
- Home stadium: Pace Field

1939 Alabama Intercollegiate Conference football standings
	Conf.					Overall
Team	W		L		T	W		L		T
Troy State $	3	–	0	–	0	7	–	4	–	0
Snead	2	–	0	–	1	2	–	3	–	2
Marion	3	–	2	–	0	4	–	4	–	0
Livingston State	2	–	2	–	0	4	–	5	–	0
St. Bernard	0	–	3	–	0	2	–	4	–	0
Jacksonville State	0	–	3	–	1	0	–	8	–	2
$ – Conference champion

1939 Southern Intercollegiate Athletic Association football standings
	Conf.					Overall
Team	W		L		T	W		L		T
Louisiana Normal $	7	–	0	–	0	11	–	0	–	0
Tennessee Tech	4	–	0	–	0	6	–	3	–	1
Mississippi College	3	–	0	–	0	6	–	1	–	1
Miami (FL)	2	–	0	–	0	5	–	5	–	0
Rollins	5	–	1	–	0	10	–	1	–	0
Western Kentucky State Teachers	5	–	1	–	1	7	–	1	–	1
Mississippi State Teachers	4	–	1	–	0	4	–	2	–	3
Murray State	4	–	1	–	1	4	–	4	–	1
Newberry	3	–	1	–	1	4	–	1	–	4
Presbyterian	3	–	1	–	2	4	–	3	–	2
Georgetown (KY)	2	–	1	–	1	4	–	4	–	1
Eastern Kentucky	3	–	2	–	0	6	–	3	–	0
Union (TN)	3	–	2	–	0	7	–	2	–	0
Morehead State	2	–	2	–	0	6	–	2	–	0
Louisville	1	–	1	–	1	5	–	2	–	1
Union (KY)	1	–	1	–	1	3	–	3	–	1
Oglethorpe	3	–	3	–	1	3	–	4	–	1
Centre	1	–	1	–	1	1	–	5	–	2
Centenary	1	–	1	–	0	2	–	9	–	1
Louisiana Tech	3	–	4	–	0	5	–	6	–	0
West Tennessee State Teachers	3	–	4	–	0	3	–	8	–	0
Troy State	2	–	3	–	0	7	–	4	–	0
SW Louisiana	2	–	3	–	0	3	–	5	–	1
Stetson	2	–	4	–	2	3	–	5	–	2
Louisiana College	2	–	5	–	0	4	–	6	–	1
Middle Tennessee State Teachers	1	–	5	–	1	1	–	6	–	1
Erskine	1	–	5	–	0	1	–	9	–	0
Delta State	1	–	6	–	0	1	–	9	–	0
Wofford	0	–	2	–	3	1	–	5	–	3
Tampa	0	–	3	–	1	2	–	7	–	1
Jacksonville State	0	–	3	–	1	0	–	8	–	2
Transylvania	0	–	7	–	0	1	–	8	–	0
Emory and Henry	0	–	0	–	0	7	–	2	–	0
$ – Conference champion

The 1939 Troy State Red Wave football team represented Troy State Teachers College (now known as Troy University) as a member of the Alabama Intercollegiate Conference (AIC) and the Southern Intercollegiate Athletic Association (SIAA) during the 1939 college football season. Led by third-year head coach Albert Choate, the Red Wave compiled an overall record of 7–4, with a mark of 3–0 in AIC play, winning the conference title. Troy State had a record of 2–3 against SIAA opponents, tying for 22nd place.

== Schedule ==
Date	Opponent	Site	Result	Attendance	Source
September 22	Livingston State	Pace Field; Troy, AL	W 13–0		
September 30	at Mississippi State Teachers	Faulkner Field; Hattiesburg, MS	L 6–13		
October 6	at Spring Hill*	Dorn Stadium; Mobile, AL	L 0–13		
October 14	at Delta State	Delta Field; Cleveland, MS	W 14–0		
October 19	Georgia Teachers*	Wiregrass Stadium; Dothan, AL	W 7–6		
October 26	at Marion	Johnson Field; Marion, AL	W 13–6		
November 3	West Tennessee State	Wiregrass Stadium; Dothan, AL	L 7–13	1,500	
November 11	Jacksonville State	Pace Field; Troy, AL (rivalry)	W 27–0		
November 17	at Middle Tennessee State	Horace Jones Field; Murfreesboro, TN (rivalry)	L 7–14	1,500	
November 30	Livingston State*	Wiregrass Stadium; Dothan, AL	W 7–0	1,200	
December 5	at Fort Benning*	Memorial Stadium; Columbus, GA	W 20–6	6,500	
*Non-conference game
