= 1939 Rollins Tars football team =

American college football season

1939 Rollins Tars football
- Conference: Southern Intercollegiate Athletic Association
- Record: 10–1 (5–1 SIAA)
- Head coach: Jack McDowall (11th season)
- Home stadium: Greater Orlando Stadium

1939 Southern Intercollegiate Athletic Association football standings
	Conf.					Overall
Team	W		L		T	W		L		T
Louisiana Normal $	7	–	0	–	0	11	–	0	–	0
Tennessee Tech	4	–	0	–	0	6	–	3	–	1
Mississippi College	3	–	0	–	0	6	–	1	–	1
Miami (FL)	2	–	0	–	0	5	–	5	–	0
Rollins	5	–	1	–	0	10	–	1	–	0
Western Kentucky State Teachers	5	–	1	–	1	7	–	1	–	1
Mississippi State Teachers	4	–	1	–	0	4	–	2	–	3
Murray State	4	–	1	–	1	4	–	4	–	1
Newberry	3	–	1	–	1	4	–	1	–	4
Presbyterian	3	–	1	–	2	4	–	3	–	2
Georgetown (KY)	2	–	1	–	1	4	–	4	–	1
Eastern Kentucky	3	–	2	–	0	6	–	3	–	0
Union (TN)	3	–	2	–	0	7	–	2	–	0
Morehead State	2	–	2	–	0	6	–	2	–	0
Louisville	1	–	1	–	1	5	–	2	–	1
Union (KY)	1	–	1	–	1	3	–	3	–	1
Oglethorpe	3	–	3	–	1	3	–	4	–	1
Centre	1	–	1	–	1	1	–	5	–	2
Centenary	1	–	1	–	0	2	–	9	–	1
Louisiana Tech	3	–	4	–	0	5	–	6	–	0
West Tennessee State Teachers	3	–	4	–	0	3	–	8	–	0
Troy State	2	–	3	–	0	7	–	4	–	0
SW Louisiana	2	–	3	–	0	3	–	5	–	1
Stetson	2	–	4	–	2	3	–	5	–	2
Louisiana College	2	–	5	–	0	4	–	6	–	1
Middle Tennessee State Teachers	1	–	5	–	1	1	–	6	–	1
Erskine	1	–	5	–	0	1	–	9	–	0
Delta State	1	–	6	–	0	1	–	9	–	0
Wofford	0	–	2	–	3	1	–	5	–	3
Tampa	0	–	3	–	1	2	–	7	–	1
Jacksonville State	0	–	3	–	1	0	–	8	–	2
Transylvania	0	–	7	–	0	1	–	8	–	0
Emory and Henry	0	–	0	–	0	7	–	2	–	0
$ – Conference champion

The 1939 Rollins Tars football team was an American football team that represented Rollins College as a member of the Southern Intercollegiate Athletic Association (SIAA) during the 1939 college football season. In their 11th years under head coach Jack McDowall, the Tars compiled an 10–1 record (5–1 against SIAA opponents) and outscored opponents by a total of 336 to 55. The team played home games at the Greater Orlando Stadium in Orlando, Florida.

Rollins was ranked at No. 98 (out of 609 teams) in the final Litkenhous Ratings for 1939.

== Schedule ==
Date	Time	Opponent	Site	Result	Attendance	Source
September 15		at Erskine	Anderson, SC	W 27–0	3,000	
September 23		vs. Appalachian State*	Memorial Stadium; Asheville, NC	W 14–7		
September 29		South Georgia*	Greater Orlando Stadium; Orlando, FL	W 54–7	2,000	
October 6	8:00 p.m.	at Stetson	Hulley Field; DeLand, FL	W 27–7	2,000	
October 20		at Miami (FL)	Burdine Stadium; Miami, FL	L 6–14	16,909	
October 27		Havana*	Greater Orlando Stadium; Orlando, FL	W 25–0		
November 17	8:00 p.m.	at Tampa	Phillips Field; Tampa, FL	W 46–0	3,000	
November 24		Presbyterian	Greater Orlando Stadium; Orlando, FL	W 13–0		
December 1	8:15 p.m.	Stetson^{†}	Greater Orlando Stadium; Orlando, FL	W 27–7	3,000	
December 23		at Havana*	Havana University stadium; Havana, Cuba	W 71–0		
December 27	9:00 p.m.	vs. Tampa*	Havana University stadium; Havana, Cuba	W 26–13	4,000	
*Non-conference game; ^{†}Homecoming; All times are in Eastern time
