= 1939 Chattanooga Moccasins football team =

American college football season

1939 Chattanooga Moccasins football
- Conference: Dixie Conference
- Record: 5–2–1 (2–1–1 Dixie)
- Head coach: Scrappy Moore (9th season)
- Captain: George Mathis
- Home stadium: Chamberlain Field

1939 Dixie Conference football standings
	Conf.					Overall
Team	W		L		T	W		L		T
Southwestern (TN)	2	–	0	–	0	3	–	5	–	1
Loyola (LA) $	3	–	1	–	0	5	–	5	–	0
Mississippi College	3	–	1	–	1	6	–	1	–	1
Chattanooga	2	–	1	–	1	5	–	2	–	1
Millsaps	2	–	1	–	1	4	–	3	–	2
Birmingham–Southern	2	–	3	–	1	3	–	5	–	1
Howard (AL)	2	–	3	–	1	3	–	6	–	1
Mercer	1	–	3	–	0	3	–	7	–	0
Spring Hill	0	–	4	–	1	1	–	7	–	1
$ – Conference champion

The 1939 Chattanooga Moccasins football team was an American football team that represented the University of Chattanooga (now known as the University of Tennessee at Chattanooga) in the Dixie Conference during the 1939 college football season. In its ninth year under head coach Scrappy Moore, the team compiled a 5–2–1 record.

Chattanooga was ranked at No. 154 (out of 609 teams) in the final Litkenhous Ratings for 1939.

== Schedule ==
Date	Opponent	Site	Result	Attendance	Source
September 29	Tennessee Tech*	Chamberlain Field; Chattanooga, TN	W 20–0	5,888	
October 6	at Mississippi College	Provine Field; Clinton, MS	T 0–0		
October 14	Tennessee*	Chamberlain Field; Chattanooga, TN	L 0–28	6,987	
October 21	at Howard (AL)	Legion Field; Birmingham, AL	L 14–33	4,000	
November 4	Sewanee*	Chamberlain Field; Chattanooga, TN	W 10–7		
November 11	Birmingham–Southern	Chamberlain Field; Chattanooga, TN	W 13–12	3,082	
November 17	at Centre*	Cheek Field; Danville, KY	W 12–2		
November 30	Mercer	Chamberlain Field; Chattanooga, TN	W 21–18	5,240	
*Non-conference game
