= 1939 Birmingham–Southern Panthers football team =

American college football season

1939 Birmingham–Southern Panthers football
- Conference: Dixie Conference
- Record: 3–5–1 (2–3–1 Dixie)
- Head coach: Jenks Gillem (12th season)
- Home stadium: Legion Field; Munger Bowl

1939 Dixie Conference football standings
	Conf.					Overall
Team	W		L		T	W		L		T
Southwestern (TN)	2	–	0	–	0	3	–	5	–	1
Loyola (LA) $	3	–	1	–	0	5	–	5	–	0
Mississippi College	3	–	1	–	1	6	–	1	–	1
Chattanooga	2	–	1	–	1	5	–	2	–	1
Millsaps	2	–	1	–	1	4	–	3	–	2
Birmingham–Southern	2	–	3	–	1	3	–	5	–	1
Howard (AL)	2	–	3	–	1	3	–	6	–	1
Mercer	1	–	3	–	0	3	–	7	–	0
Spring Hill	0	–	4	–	1	1	–	7	–	1
$ – Conference champion

The 1939 Birmingham–Southern Panthers football team was an American football team that represented Birmingham–Southern College as a member of the Dixie Conference during the 1939 college football season. In their twelfth season under head coach Jenks Gillem, the team compiled a 3–5–1 record. After the season, Birmingham–Southern discontinued their football program until its revival in 2007.

== Schedule ==
Date	Opponent	Site	Result	Attendance	Source
September 29	at Auburn*	Cramton Bowl; Montgomery, AL	L 0–6	10,000	
October 6	at Loyola (LA)	Loyola University Stadium; New Orleans, LA	L 6–7		
October 13	Louisiana Tech*	Legion Field; Birmingham, AL	W 7–6		
October 21	at Mercer	Centennial Stadium; Macon, GA	L 0–10	4,500	
October 27	at Millsaps	Fairgrounds Stadium; Jackson, MS	T 7–7	2,500	
November 4	at Mississippi State*	Scott Field; Starkville, MS	L 0–28	6,000	
November 11	at Chattanooga	Chamberlain Field; Chattanooga, TN	L 12–13	3,082	
November 17	Spring Hill	Munger Bowl; Birmingham, AL	W 13–6	4,000	
November 30	vs. Howard (AL)	Legion Field; Birmingham, AL	W 9–6	8,000	
*Non-conference game
