= Ray E. Davis =

American football player and sports coach (1907–1972)

Biographical details
- Born: September 14, 1907; Birmingham, Alabama, U.S.
- Died: August 26, 1972 (aged 64); Fort Walton Beach, Florida, U.S.

Playing career

Football
- c. 1930: Howard (AL)
- 1932–1933: Portsmouth Spartans
- Positions: Center, guard, tackle, end

Coaching career (HC unless noted)

Football
- 1934–1938: Howard (AL) (line)
- 1939: Louisiana Tech

Baseball
- 1939: Louisiana Tech

Head coaching record
- Overall: 5–6 (football)

Raymond Elswood Davis (September 14, 1907 – August 26, 1972) was an American football player and coach of football and baseball. He was the head football and baseball coach at Louisiana Polytechnic Institute—now known as Louisiana Tech University—in 1939. Davis played college football at Howard College—now known as Samford University—in Homewood, Alabama. He played professionally in the National Football League (NFL) with the Portsmouth Spartans—now known as the Detroit Tigers in 1932 and 1933. David returned to his alma mater, Howard, in 1934, where he served as line coach for the football team under head coaches Clyde Propst and Billy Bancroft.

== Head coaching record ==
=== Football ===
Year	Team	Overall	Conference	Standing	Bowl/playoffs
Louisiana Tech Bulldogs (Louisiana Intercollegiate Conference / Southern Intercollegiate Athletic Association) (1939)
1939	Louisiana Tech	5–6	1–3 / 3–4	/ T–20th	
Louisiana Tech:		5–6	3–4		
Total:		5–6			
