= 1939 Miami Hurricanes football team =

American college football season

1939 Miami Hurricanes football
- Conference: Southern Intercollegiate Athletic Association
- Record: 5–5 (2–0 SIAA)
- Head coach: Jack Harding (1st season)
- Home stadium: Burdine Stadium

1939 Southern Intercollegiate Athletic Association football standings
	Conf.					Overall
Team	W		L		T	W		L		T
Louisiana Normal $	7	–	0	–	0	11	–	0	–	0
Tennessee Tech	4	–	0	–	0	6	–	3	–	1
Mississippi College	3	–	0	–	0	6	–	1	–	1
Miami (FL)	2	–	0	–	0	5	–	5	–	0
Rollins	5	–	1	–	0	10	–	1	–	0
Western Kentucky State Teachers	5	–	1	–	1	7	–	1	–	1
Mississippi State Teachers	4	–	1	–	0	4	–	2	–	3
Murray State	4	–	1	–	1	4	–	4	–	1
Newberry	3	–	1	–	1	4	–	1	–	4
Presbyterian	3	–	1	–	2	4	–	3	–	2
Georgetown (KY)	2	–	1	–	1	4	–	4	–	1
Eastern Kentucky	3	–	2	–	0	6	–	3	–	0
Union (TN)	3	–	2	–	0	7	–	2	–	0
Morehead State	2	–	2	–	0	6	–	2	–	0
Louisville	1	–	1	–	1	5	–	2	–	1
Union (KY)	1	–	1	–	1	3	–	3	–	1
Oglethorpe	3	–	3	–	1	3	–	4	–	1
Centre	1	–	1	–	1	1	–	5	–	2
Centenary	1	–	1	–	0	2	–	9	–	1
Louisiana Tech	3	–	4	–	0	5	–	6	–	0
West Tennessee State Teachers	3	–	4	–	0	3	–	8	–	0
Troy State	2	–	3	–	0	7	–	4	–	0
SW Louisiana	2	–	3	–	0	3	–	5	–	1
Stetson	2	–	4	–	2	3	–	5	–	2
Louisiana College	2	–	5	–	0	4	–	6	–	1
Middle Tennessee State Teachers	1	–	5	–	1	1	–	6	–	1
Erskine	1	–	5	–	0	1	–	9	–	0
Delta State	1	–	6	–	0	1	–	9	–	0
Wofford	0	–	2	–	3	1	–	5	–	3
Tampa	0	–	3	–	1	2	–	7	–	1
Jacksonville State	0	–	3	–	1	0	–	8	–	2
Transylvania	0	–	7	–	0	1	–	8	–	0
Emory and Henry	0	–	0	–	0	7	–	2	–	0
$ – Conference champion

The 1939 Miami Hurricanes football team represented the University of Miami as a member of the Southern Intercollegiate Athletic Association (SIAA) in the 1939 college football season. The Hurricanes played their home games at Burdine Stadium in Miami, Florida. The team was coached by Jack Harding, in his third year as head coach for the Hurricanes.

Miami was ranked at No. 88 (out of 609 teams) in the final Litkenhous Ratings for 1939.

== Schedule ==
Date	Time	Opponent	Site	Result	Attendance	Source
October 6		Wake Forest*	Burdine Stadium; Miami, FL	L 0–33	20,100	
October 14	8:30 p.m.	at Tampa	Phillips Field; Tampa, FL	W 32–7	7,000–8,500	
October 20		Rollins	Burdine Stadium; Miami, FL	W 14–6	16,909	
October 27		Catholic University*	Burdine Stadium; Miami, FL	L 0–14	17,046	
November 3	8:15 p.m.	Texas Tech*	Burdine Stadium; Miami, FL	W 19–0	11,337	
November 10		Drake*	Burdine Stadium; Miami, FL	W 33–6	16,415	
November 18	8:15 p.m.	Florida*	Burdine Stadium; Miami, FL (rivalry)	L 0–13	26,000–28,000	
November 25		at South Carolina*	Columbia Municipal Stadium; Columbia, SC	L 6–7	5,000	
December 1	8:15 p.m.	NC State*	Burdine Stadium; Miami, FL	W 27–7	11,420	
December 8	8:15 p.m.	Georgia*	Burdine Stadium; Miami, FL	L 0–13	16,402	
*Non-conference game; All times are in Eastern time
