= 1939 Southwestern Lynx football team =

American college football season

1939 Southwestern Lynx football

Dixie champion
- Conference: Dixie Conference
- Record: 3–5–1 (2–0 Dixie)
- Head coach: Ed Kubale (2nd season)
- Home stadium: Crump Stadium

1939 Dixie Conference football standings
	Conf.					Overall
Team	W		L		T	W		L		T
Southwestern (TN)	2	–	0	–	0	3	–	5	–	1
Loyola (LA) $	3	–	1	–	0	5	–	5	–	0
Mississippi College	3	–	1	–	1	6	–	1	–	1
Chattanooga	2	–	1	–	1	5	–	2	–	1
Millsaps	2	–	1	–	1	4	–	3	–	2
Birmingham–Southern	2	–	3	–	1	3	–	5	–	1
Howard (AL)	2	–	3	–	1	3	–	6	–	1
Mercer	1	–	3	–	0	3	–	7	–	0
Spring Hill	0	–	4	–	1	1	–	7	–	1
$ – Conference champion

The 1939 Southwestern Lynx football team was an American football team that represented Southwestern, The College of the Mississippi Valley (now known as Rhodes College) as a member of the Dixie Conference in the 1939 college football season. Led by Ed Kubale in his second season as head coach, the team compiled an overall record of 3–5–1, with a mark of 2–0 in conference play, and finished as Dixie champion.

== Schedule ==
Date	Opponent	Site	Result	Attendance	Source
October 7	Ole Miss*	Crump Stadium; Memphis, TN	L 0–41	12,000	
October 14	Washington and Lee*	Crump Stadium; Memphis, TN	T 7–7	8,000	
October 21	at Mississippi State*	Scott Field; Starkville, MS	L 0–37	5,000	
October 27	Sewanee*	Crump Stadium; Memphis, TN (rivalry)	L 0–6		
November 3	at Loyola (LA)	Loyola University Stadium; New Orleans, LA	W 20–0		
November 11	at Howard (AL)	Crump Stadium; Memphis, TN	W 13–6		
November 18	No. 16 Clemson*	Crump Stadium; Memphis, TN	L 6–21	4,500	
November 25	at Centenary*	Centenary College Stadium; Shreveport, LA	L 7–13		
December 2	vs. West Tennessee State Teachers*	Crump Stadium; Memphis, TN	W 32–0	3,000	
*Non-conference game; Rankings from AP Poll released prior to the game
