= 1939 Louisiana Normal Demons football team =

American college football season

1939 Louisiana Normal Demons football

LIC champion SIAA champion
- Conference: Louisiana Intercollegiate Conference, Southern Intercollegiate Athletic Association
- Record: 11–0 (4–0 LIC, 7–0 SIAA)
- Head coach: Harry Turpin (6th season)

1939 Southern Intercollegiate Athletic Association football standings
	Conf.					Overall
Team	W		L		T	W		L		T
Louisiana Normal $	7	–	0	–	0	11	–	0	–	0
Tennessee Tech	4	–	0	–	0	6	–	3	–	1
Mississippi College	3	–	0	–	0	6	–	1	–	1
Miami (FL)	2	–	0	–	0	5	–	5	–	0
Rollins	5	–	1	–	0	10	–	1	–	0
Western Kentucky State Teachers	5	–	1	–	1	7	–	1	–	1
Mississippi State Teachers	4	–	1	–	0	4	–	2	–	3
Murray State	4	–	1	–	1	4	–	4	–	1
Newberry	3	–	1	–	1	4	–	1	–	4
Presbyterian	3	–	1	–	2	4	–	3	–	2
Georgetown (KY)	2	–	1	–	1	4	–	4	–	1
Eastern Kentucky	3	–	2	–	0	6	–	3	–	0
Union (TN)	3	–	2	–	0	7	–	2	–	0
Morehead State	2	–	2	–	0	6	–	2	–	0
Louisville	1	–	1	–	1	5	–	2	–	1
Union (KY)	1	–	1	–	1	3	–	3	–	1
Oglethorpe	3	–	3	–	1	3	–	4	–	1
Centre	1	–	1	–	1	1	–	5	–	2
Centenary	1	–	1	–	0	2	–	9	–	1
Louisiana Tech	3	–	4	–	0	5	–	6	–	0
West Tennessee State Teachers	3	–	4	–	0	3	–	8	–	0
Troy State	2	–	3	–	0	7	–	4	–	0
SW Louisiana	2	–	3	–	0	3	–	5	–	1
Stetson	2	–	4	–	2	3	–	5	–	2
Louisiana College	2	–	5	–	0	4	–	6	–	1
Middle Tennessee State Teachers	1	–	5	–	1	1	–	6	–	1
Erskine	1	–	5	–	0	1	–	9	–	0
Delta State	1	–	6	–	0	1	–	9	–	0
Wofford	0	–	2	–	3	1	–	5	–	3
Tampa	0	–	3	–	1	2	–	7	–	1
Jacksonville State	0	–	3	–	1	0	–	8	–	2
Transylvania	0	–	7	–	0	1	–	8	–	0
Emory and Henry	0	–	0	–	0	7	–	2	–	0
$ – Conference champion

The 1939 Louisiana Normal Demons football team represented the Louisiana State Normal School—now known as Northwestern State University—as a member of the Louisiana Intercollegiate Conference (LIC) and the Southern Intercollegiate Athletic Association (SIAA) during the 1939 college football season. Louisiana Normal finished with an 11–0 record and claimed the LIC championship.

Louisiana Normal was ranked at No. 105 (out of 609 teams) in the final Litkenhous Ratings for 1939.

== Schedule ==
Date	Opponent	Site	Result	Attendance	Source
September 16	at Centenary	Centenary College Stadium; Shreveport, LA	W 15–0		
September 29	at East Texas State*	East Texas Stadium; Commerce, TX	W 6–0		
October 6	at Southeastern Louisiana*	Strawberry Stadium; Hammond, LA (rivalry)	W 18–6		
October 14	Louisiana College^{†}	Demon Field; Natchitoches, LA	W 19–0	7,000	
October 21	vs. Louisiana Tech	State Fair Stadium; Shreveport, LA (rivalry)	W 26–0	7,500	
October 27	at Delta State	Delta Field; Cleveland, MS	W 40–6		
November 3	Stephen F. Austin*	Demon Field; Natchitoches, LA (rivalry)	W 20–6		
November 11	at Murray State	Cutchin Stadium; Murray, KY	W 19–0		
November 17	Ouachita Baptist*	Demon Field; Natchitoches, LA	W 19–0	3,500	
November 23	at Mississippi State Teachers	Faulkner Field; Hattiesburg, MS	W 7–0		
November 30	Southwestern Louisiana	Demon Field; Natchitoches, LA	W 6–0	5,000	
*Non-conference game; ^{†}Homecoming
