= 1939 Southwestern Louisiana Bulldogs football team =

American college football season

1939 Southwestern Louisiana Bulldogs football
- Conference: Louisiana Intercollegiate Conference, Southern Intercollegiate Athletic Association
- Record: 3–5–1 (1–2 LIC, 2–3 SIAA)
- Head coach: Johnny Cain (3rd season)
- Home stadium: Campus Athletic Field

1939 Southern Intercollegiate Athletic Association football standings
	Conf.					Overall
Team	W		L		T	W		L		T
Louisiana Normal $	7	–	0	–	0	11	–	0	–	0
Tennessee Tech	4	–	0	–	0	6	–	3	–	1
Mississippi College	3	–	0	–	0	6	–	1	–	1
Miami (FL)	2	–	0	–	0	5	–	5	–	0
Rollins	5	–	1	–	0	10	–	1	–	0
Western Kentucky State Teachers	5	–	1	–	1	7	–	1	–	1
Mississippi State Teachers	4	–	1	–	0	4	–	2	–	3
Murray State	4	–	1	–	1	4	–	4	–	1
Newberry	3	–	1	–	1	4	–	1	–	4
Presbyterian	3	–	1	–	2	4	–	3	–	2
Georgetown (KY)	2	–	1	–	1	4	–	4	–	1
Eastern Kentucky	3	–	2	–	0	6	–	3	–	0
Union (TN)	3	–	2	–	0	7	–	2	–	0
Morehead State	2	–	2	–	0	6	–	2	–	0
Louisville	1	–	1	–	1	5	–	2	–	1
Union (KY)	1	–	1	–	1	3	–	3	–	1
Oglethorpe	3	–	3	–	1	3	–	4	–	1
Centre	1	–	1	–	1	1	–	5	–	2
Centenary	1	–	1	–	0	2	–	9	–	1
Louisiana Tech	3	–	4	–	0	5	–	6	–	0
West Tennessee State Teachers	3	–	4	–	0	3	–	8	–	0
Troy State	2	–	3	–	0	7	–	4	–	0
SW Louisiana	2	–	3	–	0	3	–	5	–	1
Stetson	2	–	4	–	2	3	–	5	–	2
Louisiana College	2	–	5	–	0	4	–	6	–	1
Middle Tennessee State Teachers	1	–	5	–	1	1	–	6	–	1
Erskine	1	–	5	–	0	1	–	9	–	0
Delta State	1	–	6	–	0	1	–	9	–	0
Wofford	0	–	2	–	3	1	–	5	–	3
Tampa	0	–	3	–	1	2	–	7	–	1
Jacksonville State	0	–	3	–	1	0	–	8	–	2
Transylvania	0	–	7	–	0	1	–	8	–	0
Emory and Henry	0	–	0	–	0	7	–	2	–	0
$ – Conference champion

The 1939 Southwestern Louisiana Bulldogs football team was an American football team that represented the Southwestern Louisiana Institute of Liberal and Technical Learning (now known as the University of Louisiana at Lafayette) as a member of the Louisiana Intercollegiate Conference (LIC) and the Southern Intercollegiate Athletic Association (SIAA) during the 1939 college football season. In their third year under head coach Johnny Cain, the Bulldogs compiled an overall record of 3–5–1 record with a mark of 2–3 in SIAA play.

Southwestern Louisiana was ranked at No. 171 (out of 609 teams) in the final Litkenhous Ratings for 1939.

== Schedule ==
Date	Opponent	Site	Result	Attendance	Source
September 22	at Delta State	Delta Field; Cleveland, MS	W 19–6		
September 29	Stephen F. Austin*	Campus Athletic Field; Lafayette, LA	T 0–0		
October 6	at East Texas State*	Commerce, TX	L 0–6		
October 13	Spring Hill*	Campus Athletic Field; Lafayette, LA	W 20–0		
October 27	Louisiana College	Campus Athletic Field; Lafayette, LA	L 6–7		
November 4	at Louisiana Tech	Tech Stadium; Ruston, LA (rivalry)	W 12–6		
November 10	Loyola (LA)*	Campus Athletic Field; Lafayette, LA	L 18–20		
November 17	Mississippi State Teachers	McNaspy Stadium; Lafayette, LA	L 7–9	5,000	
November 30	at Louisiana Normal	Demon Stadium; Natchitoches, LA	L 0–6	5,000	
*Non-conference game
