= 1939 Jacksonville State Eagle Owls football team =

American college football season

1939 Jacksonville State Eagle Owls football
- Conference: Alabama Intercollegiate Conference, Southern Intercollegiate Athletic Association
- Record: 0–8–2 (0–3–1 AIC, 0–3–1 SIAA)
- Head coach: Chester C. Dillon (2nd season)
- Home stadium: College Field

1939 Alabama Intercollegiate Conference football standings
| | Conf. | | | | | Overall |
| Team | W | | L | | T | W | | L | | T |
|---|---|---|---|---|---|---|---|---|---|---|
| Troy State $ | 3 | – | 0 | – | 0 | 7 | – | 4 | – | 0 |
| Snead | 2 | – | 0 | – | 1 | 2 | – | 3 | – | 2 |
| Marion | 3 | – | 2 | – | 0 | 4 | – | 4 | – | 0 |
| Livingston State | 2 | – | 2 | – | 0 | 4 | – | 5 | – | 0 |
| St. Bernard | 0 | – | 3 | – | 0 | 2 | – | 4 | – | 0 |
| Jacksonville State | 0 | – | 3 | – | 1 | 0 | – | 8 | – | 2 |
$ – Conference champion

1939 Southern Intercollegiate Athletic Association football standings
| | Conf. | | | | | Overall |
| Team | W | | L | | T | W | | L | | T |
|---|---|---|---|---|---|---|---|---|---|---|
| Louisiana Normal $ | 7 | – | 0 | – | 0 | 11 | – | 0 | – | 0 |
| Tennessee Tech | 4 | – | 0 | – | 0 | 6 | – | 3 | – | 1 |
| Mississippi College | 3 | – | 0 | – | 0 | 6 | – | 1 | – | 1 |
| Miami (FL) | 2 | – | 0 | – | 0 | 5 | – | 5 | – | 0 |
| Rollins | 5 | – | 1 | – | 0 | 10 | – | 1 | – | 0 |
| Western Kentucky State Teachers | 5 | – | 1 | – | 1 | 7 | – | 1 | – | 1 |
| Mississippi State Teachers | 4 | – | 1 | – | 0 | 4 | – | 2 | – | 3 |
| Murray State | 4 | – | 1 | – | 1 | 4 | – | 4 | – | 1 |
| Newberry | 3 | – | 1 | – | 1 | 4 | – | 1 | – | 4 |
| Presbyterian | 3 | – | 1 | – | 2 | 4 | – | 3 | – | 2 |
| Georgetown (KY) | 2 | – | 1 | – | 1 | 4 | – | 4 | – | 1 |
| Eastern Kentucky | 3 | – | 2 | – | 0 | 6 | – | 3 | – | 0 |
| Union (TN) | 3 | – | 2 | – | 0 | 7 | – | 2 | – | 0 |
| Morehead State | 2 | – | 2 | – | 0 | 6 | – | 2 | – | 0 |
| Louisville | 1 | – | 1 | – | 1 | 5 | – | 2 | – | 1 |
| Union (KY) | 1 | – | 1 | – | 1 | 3 | – | 3 | – | 1 |
| Oglethorpe | 3 | – | 3 | – | 1 | 3 | – | 4 | – | 1 |
| Centre | 1 | – | 1 | – | 1 | 1 | – | 5 | – | 2 |
| Centenary | 1 | – | 1 | – | 0 | 2 | – | 9 | – | 1 |
| Louisiana Tech | 3 | – | 4 | – | 0 | 5 | – | 6 | – | 0 |
| West Tennessee State Teachers | 3 | – | 4 | – | 0 | 3 | – | 8 | – | 0 |
| Troy State | 2 | – | 3 | – | 0 | 7 | – | 4 | – | 0 |
| SW Louisiana | 2 | – | 3 | – | 0 | 3 | – | 5 | – | 1 |
| Stetson | 2 | – | 4 | – | 2 | 3 | – | 5 | – | 2 |
| Louisiana College | 2 | – | 5 | – | 0 | 4 | – | 6 | – | 1 |
| Middle Tennessee State Teachers | 1 | – | 5 | – | 1 | 1 | – | 6 | – | 1 |
| Erskine | 1 | – | 5 | – | 0 | 1 | – | 9 | – | 0 |
| Delta State | 1 | – | 6 | – | 0 | 1 | – | 9 | – | 0 |
| Wofford | 0 | – | 2 | – | 3 | 1 | – | 5 | – | 3 |
| Tampa | 0 | – | 3 | – | 1 | 2 | – | 7 | – | 1 |
| Jacksonville State | 0 | – | 3 | – | 1 | 0 | – | 8 | – | 2 |
| Transylvania | 0 | – | 7 | – | 0 | 1 | – | 8 | – | 0 |
| Emory and Henry | 0 | – | 0 | – | 0 | 7 | – | 2 | – | 0 |
$ – Conference champion

The 1939 Jacksonville State Eagle Owls football team represented Jacksonville State Teachers College (now known as Jacksonville State University) as a member of the Alabama Intercollegiate Conference (AIC) and the Southern Intercollegiate Athletic Association (SIAA) during the 1939 college football season. Led by second-year head coach Chester C. Dillon, the Eagle Owls compiled an overall record of 0–8–2 with a mark of 0–3–1 in both AIC and SIAA play.

== Schedule ==
| Date | Opponent | Site | Result | Attendance | Source |
|---|---|---|---|---|---|
| September 22 | at Middle Tennessee State | Horace Jones Field; Murfreesboro, TN | T 6–6 | 4,000 | |
| September 30 | at Louisiana Tech | Tech Stadium; Ruston, LA | L 0–39 | | |
| October 6 | at Middle Georgia* | Cochran, GA | L 0–8 | | |
| October 7 | at Georgia Teachers* | Statesboro, GA | L 0–13 | | |
| October 13 | at Marion | Johnson Field; Marion, AL | L 6–7 | | |
| October 20 | Oglethorpe | Memorial Stadium; Anniston, AL | L 0–40 | | |
| October 28 | Snead | College Field; Jacksonville, AL | T 0–0 | | |
| November 3 | Livingston State | College Field; Jacksonville, AL | L 7–13 | | |
| November 11 | at Troy State | Pace Field; Troy, AL (rivalry) | L 0–27 | | |
| November 17 | at Hiwassee* | Madisonville, TN | L 6–40 | | |
*Non-conference game
