= 1939 Oglethorpe Stormy Petrels football team =

American college football season

1939 Oglethorpe Stormy Petrels football
- Conference: Southern Intercollegiate Athletic Association
- Record: 3–4–1 (3–3–1 SIAA)
- Head coach: John W. Patrick (6th season)
- Home stadium: Hermance Stadium

1939 Southern Intercollegiate Athletic Association football standings
	Conf.					Overall
Team	W		L		T	W		L		T
Louisiana Normal $	7	–	0	–	0	11	–	0	–	0
Tennessee Tech	4	–	0	–	0	6	–	3	–	1
Mississippi College	3	–	0	–	0	6	–	1	–	1
Miami (FL)	2	–	0	–	0	5	–	5	–	0
Rollins	5	–	1	–	0	10	–	1	–	0
Western Kentucky State Teachers	5	–	1	–	1	7	–	1	–	1
Mississippi State Teachers	4	–	1	–	0	4	–	2	–	3
Murray State	4	–	1	–	1	4	–	4	–	1
Newberry	3	–	1	–	1	4	–	1	–	4
Presbyterian	3	–	1	–	2	4	–	3	–	2
Georgetown (KY)	2	–	1	–	1	4	–	4	–	1
Eastern Kentucky	3	–	2	–	0	6	–	3	–	0
Union (TN)	3	–	2	–	0	7	–	2	–	0
Morehead State	2	–	2	–	0	6	–	2	–	0
Louisville	1	–	1	–	1	5	–	2	–	1
Union (KY)	1	–	1	–	1	3	–	3	–	1
Oglethorpe	3	–	3	–	1	3	–	4	–	1
Centre	1	–	1	–	1	1	–	5	–	2
Centenary	1	–	1	–	0	2	–	9	–	1
Louisiana Tech	3	–	4	–	0	5	–	6	–	0
West Tennessee State Teachers	3	–	4	–	0	3	–	8	–	0
Troy State	2	–	3	–	0	7	–	4	–	0
SW Louisiana	2	–	3	–	0	3	–	5	–	1
Stetson	2	–	4	–	2	3	–	5	–	2
Louisiana College	2	–	5	–	0	4	–	6	–	1
Middle Tennessee State Teachers	1	–	5	–	1	1	–	6	–	1
Erskine	1	–	5	–	0	1	–	9	–	0
Delta State	1	–	6	–	0	1	–	9	–	0
Wofford	0	–	2	–	3	1	–	5	–	3
Tampa	0	–	3	–	1	2	–	7	–	1
Jacksonville State	0	–	3	–	1	0	–	8	–	2
Transylvania	0	–	7	–	0	1	–	8	–	0
Emory and Henry	0	–	0	–	0	7	–	2	–	0
$ – Conference champion

The 1939 Oglethorpe Stormy Petrels football team was an American football team that represented Oglethorpe University as a member of the Southern Intercollegiate Athletic Association (SIAA) during the 1939 college football season. In their sixth year under head coach John W. Patrick, the Stormy Petrels compiled an overall record of 3–4–1 with a mark of 3–3–1 in conference play, placing in a six-way for 14th in the SIAA. The team played home games at Hermance Stadium in North Atlanta, Georgia.

== Schedule ==
Date	Time	Opponent	Site	Result	Attendance	Source
September 30		Erskine	Hermance Stadium; North Atlanta, GA	W 26–0		
October 6		at Wofford	Snyder Field; Spartanburg, SC	T 0–0		
October 14		at Kentucky*	Stoll Field; Lexington, KY	L 0–59		
October 20		at Jacksonville State	Memorial Stadium; Anniston, AL	W 40–0		
October 27		at Presbyterian	Bailey Stadium; Clinton, SC	L 0–6	3,000	
November 3		at Newberry	Setzler Field; Newberry, SC	L 6–7	2,500	
November 18	2:15 p.m.	Stetson^{†}	Hermance Stadium; North Atlanta, GA	W 20–13	2,000	
November 25		Mississippi College	Hermance Stadium; North Atlanta, GA	L 6–14		
*Non-conference game; ^{†}Homecoming; All times are in Eastern time
