= 1939 Middle Tennessee State Teachers Blue Raiders football team =

American college football season

1939 Middle Tennessee State Teachers Blue Raiders football
- Conference: Southern Intercollegiate Athletic Association
- Record: 1–6–1 (1–5–1 SIAA)
- Head coach: Ernest Alley (1st season)
- Captain: Sam Smith
- Home stadium: Horace Jones Field

1939 Southern Intercollegiate Athletic Association football standings
| | Conf. | | | | | Overall |
| Team | W | | L | | T | W | | L | | T |
|---|---|---|---|---|---|---|---|---|---|---|
| Louisiana Normal $ | 7 | – | 0 | – | 0 | 11 | – | 0 | – | 0 |
| Tennessee Tech | 4 | – | 0 | – | 0 | 6 | – | 3 | – | 1 |
| Mississippi College | 3 | – | 0 | – | 0 | 6 | – | 1 | – | 1 |
| Miami (FL) | 2 | – | 0 | – | 0 | 5 | – | 5 | – | 0 |
| Rollins | 5 | – | 1 | – | 0 | 10 | – | 1 | – | 0 |
| Western Kentucky State Teachers | 5 | – | 1 | – | 1 | 7 | – | 1 | – | 1 |
| Mississippi State Teachers | 4 | – | 1 | – | 0 | 4 | – | 2 | – | 3 |
| Murray State | 4 | – | 1 | – | 1 | 4 | – | 4 | – | 1 |
| Newberry | 3 | – | 1 | – | 1 | 4 | – | 1 | – | 4 |
| Presbyterian | 3 | – | 1 | – | 2 | 4 | – | 3 | – | 2 |
| Georgetown (KY) | 2 | – | 1 | – | 1 | 4 | – | 4 | – | 1 |
| Eastern Kentucky | 3 | – | 2 | – | 0 | 6 | – | 3 | – | 0 |
| Union (TN) | 3 | – | 2 | – | 0 | 7 | – | 2 | – | 0 |
| Morehead State | 2 | – | 2 | – | 0 | 6 | – | 2 | – | 0 |
| Louisville | 1 | – | 1 | – | 1 | 5 | – | 2 | – | 1 |
| Union (KY) | 1 | – | 1 | – | 1 | 3 | – | 3 | – | 1 |
| Oglethorpe | 3 | – | 3 | – | 1 | 3 | – | 4 | – | 1 |
| Centre | 1 | – | 1 | – | 1 | 1 | – | 5 | – | 2 |
| Centenary | 1 | – | 1 | – | 0 | 2 | – | 9 | – | 1 |
| Louisiana Tech | 3 | – | 4 | – | 0 | 5 | – | 6 | – | 0 |
| West Tennessee State Teachers | 3 | – | 4 | – | 0 | 3 | – | 8 | – | 0 |
| Troy State | 2 | – | 3 | – | 0 | 7 | – | 4 | – | 0 |
| SW Louisiana | 2 | – | 3 | – | 0 | 3 | – | 5 | – | 1 |
| Stetson | 2 | – | 4 | – | 2 | 3 | – | 5 | – | 2 |
| Louisiana College | 2 | – | 5 | – | 0 | 4 | – | 6 | – | 1 |
| Middle Tennessee State Teachers | 1 | – | 5 | – | 1 | 1 | – | 6 | – | 1 |
| Erskine | 1 | – | 5 | – | 0 | 1 | – | 9 | – | 0 |
| Delta State | 1 | – | 6 | – | 0 | 1 | – | 9 | – | 0 |
| Wofford | 0 | – | 2 | – | 3 | 1 | – | 5 | – | 3 |
| Tampa | 0 | – | 3 | – | 1 | 2 | – | 7 | – | 1 |
| Jacksonville State | 0 | – | 3 | – | 1 | 0 | – | 8 | – | 2 |
| Transylvania | 0 | – | 7 | – | 0 | 1 | – | 8 | – | 0 |
| Emory and Henry | 0 | – | 0 | – | 0 | 7 | – | 2 | – | 0 |
$ – Conference champion

The 1939 Middle Tennessee State Teachers football team represented the Middle Tennessee State Teachers College (now known as Middle Tennessee State University) as a member of the Southern Intercollegiate Athletic Association (SIAA) during the 1939 college football season. Led by Ernest Alley in his first season as head coach, Middle Tennessee State Teachers compiled an overall record of 1–6–1 with a mark of 1–5–1 in conference play. The team's captain was Sam Smith.

== Schedule ==
| Date | Opponent | Site | Result | Attendance | Source |
|---|---|---|---|---|---|
| September 22 | Jacksonville State | Horace Jones Field; Murfreesboro, TN | T 6–6 | 4,000 | |
| September 29 | Murray State | Horace Jones Field; Murfreesboro, TN | L 2–14 | | |
| October 13 | West Tennessee State Teachers | Horace Jones Field; Murfreesboro, TN | L 6–25 | | |
| October 20 | at Cumberland (TN)* | Lebanon, TN | L 6–14 | | |
| October 28 | at Western Kentucky State Teachers | Western Stadium; Bowling Green, KY (rivalry) | L 2–26 | | |
| November 11 | Union (TN) | Horace Jones Field; Murfreesboro, TN | L 0–13 | | |
| November 17 | Troy State | Horace Jones Field; Murfreesboro, TN (rivalry) | W 14–7 | 1,500 | |
| November 25 | at Tennessee Tech | Overhill Field; Cookeville, TN | L 3–20 | | |
*Non-conference game
