= 1939 Millsaps Majors football team =

American college football season

1939 Millsaps Majors football
- Conference: Dixie Conference
- Record: 4–3–2 (2–1–1 Dixie)
- Head coach: Henry Louis Stone (1st season)
- Home stadium: Fairgrounds Stadium

1939 Dixie Conference football standings
	Conf.					Overall
Team	W		L		T	W		L		T
Southwestern (TN)	2	–	0	–	0	3	–	5	–	1
Loyola (LA) $	3	–	1	–	0	5	–	5	–	0
Mississippi College	3	–	1	–	1	6	–	1	–	1
Chattanooga	2	–	1	–	1	5	–	2	–	1
Millsaps	2	–	1	–	1	4	–	3	–	2
Birmingham–Southern	2	–	3	–	1	3	–	5	–	1
Howard (AL)	2	–	3	–	1	3	–	6	–	1
Mercer	1	–	3	–	0	3	–	7	–	0
Spring Hill	0	–	4	–	1	1	–	7	–	1
$ – Conference champion

The 1939 Millsaps Majors football team was an American football team that represented Millsaps College as a member of the Dixie Conference and the Southern Intercollegiate Athletic Association (SIAA) in the 1939 college football season. Led by Henry Louis Stone in his first season as head coach, the team compiled an overall record of 4–3–2, with a mark of 2–1–1 in conference play.

== Schedule ==
Date	Opponent	Site	Result	Attendance	Source
September 30	Delta State*	Fairgrounds Stadium; Jackson, MS	W 14–0		
October 7	at Howard (AL)	Legion Field; Birmingham, AL	W 7–6		
October 14	Mississippi State Teachers*	Fairgrounds Stadium; Jackson, MS	T 0–0		
October 19	at Union (TN)*	Rothrock Field; Jackson, TN	L 0–12		
October 27	Birmingham–Southern	Fairgrounds Stadium; Jackson, MS	T 7–7	2,500	
November 2	vs. Mississippi College	Municipal Stadium; Jackson, MS (rivalry)	L 0–29	3,000	
November 18	at Mississippi State*	Scott Field; Starkville, MS	L 0–40	5,000	
November 11	Spring Hill	Fairgrounds Stadium; Jackson, MS	W 6–0		
November 25	at West Tennessee State Teachers*	Crump Stadium; Memphis, TN	W 2–0	400	
*Non-conference game
