= 1939 Spring Hill Badgers football team =

American college football season

1939 Spring Hill Badgers football
- Conference: Dixie Conference
- Record: 1–7–1 (0–4–1 Dixie)
- Head coach: Earle Smith (2nd season)

1939 Dixie Conference football standings
	Conf.					Overall
Team	W		L		T	W		L		T
Southwestern (TN)	2	–	0	–	0	3	–	5	–	1
Loyola (LA) $	3	–	1	–	0	5	–	5	–	0
Mississippi College	3	–	1	–	1	6	–	1	–	1
Chattanooga	2	–	1	–	1	5	–	2	–	1
Millsaps	2	–	1	–	1	4	–	3	–	2
Birmingham–Southern	2	–	3	–	1	3	–	5	–	1
Howard (AL)	2	–	3	–	1	3	–	6	–	1
Mercer	1	–	3	–	0	3	–	7	–	0
Spring Hill	0	–	4	–	1	1	–	7	–	1
$ – Conference champion

The 1939 Spring Hill Badgers football team was an American football team that represented Spring Hill College as a member of the Dixie Conference during the 1939 college football season. In their second year under head coach Earle Smith, the team compiled a 1–7–1 record.

== Schedule ==
Date	Opponent	Site	Result	Attendance	Source
September 30	at Pensacola NAS*	Air Station Field; Pensacola, FL	L 0–41		
October 6	Troy State*	Dorn Stadium; Mobile, AL	W 13–0		
October 13	at Southwestern Louisiana*	Campus Athletic Field; Lafayette, LA	L 0–20		
October 20	at Mississippi College	Provine Field; Clinton, MS	L 7–25		
October 27	Howard (AL)	Dorn Stadium; Mobile, AL	T 0–0	3,500	
November 3	Southeastern Louisiana*	Dorn Stadium; Mobile, AL	L 0–6		
November 11	at Millsaps	Fairgrounds Stadium; Jackson, MS	L 0–6		
November 17	at Birmingham–Southern	Munger Bowl; Birmingham, AL	L 6–13	4,000	
November 23	at Loyola (LA)	Loyola University Stadium; New Orleans, LA	L 7–13		
*Non-conference game
