= 1939 Louisiana Tech Bulldogs football team =

American college football season

1939 Louisiana Tech Bulldogs football
- Conference: Louisiana Intercollegiate Conference, Southern Intercollegiate Athletic Association
- Record: 5–6 (1–3 LIC, 3–4 SIAA)
- Head coach: Ray E. Davis (1st season)
- Captain: Jack Jaggers
- Home stadium: Tech Stadium

1939 Southern Intercollegiate Athletic Association football standings
	Conf.					Overall
Team	W		L		T	W		L		T
Louisiana Normal $	7	–	0	–	0	11	–	0	–	0
Tennessee Tech	4	–	0	–	0	6	–	3	–	1
Mississippi College	3	–	0	–	0	6	–	1	–	1
Miami (FL)	2	–	0	–	0	5	–	5	–	0
Rollins	5	–	1	–	0	10	–	1	–	0
Western Kentucky State Teachers	5	–	1	–	1	7	–	1	–	1
Mississippi State Teachers	4	–	1	–	0	4	–	2	–	3
Murray State	4	–	1	–	1	4	–	4	–	1
Newberry	3	–	1	–	1	4	–	1	–	4
Presbyterian	3	–	1	–	2	4	–	3	–	2
Georgetown (KY)	2	–	1	–	1	4	–	4	–	1
Eastern Kentucky	3	–	2	–	0	6	–	3	–	0
Union (TN)	3	–	2	–	0	7	–	2	–	0
Morehead State	2	–	2	–	0	6	–	2	–	0
Louisville	1	–	1	–	1	5	–	2	–	1
Union (KY)	1	–	1	–	1	3	–	3	–	1
Oglethorpe	3	–	3	–	1	3	–	4	–	1
Centre	1	–	1	–	1	1	–	5	–	2
Centenary	1	–	1	–	0	2	–	9	–	1
Louisiana Tech	3	–	4	–	0	5	–	6	–	0
West Tennessee State Teachers	3	–	4	–	0	3	–	8	–	0
Troy State	2	–	3	–	0	7	–	4	–	0
SW Louisiana	2	–	3	–	0	3	–	5	–	1
Stetson	2	–	4	–	2	3	–	5	–	2
Louisiana College	2	–	5	–	0	4	–	6	–	1
Middle Tennessee State Teachers	1	–	5	–	1	1	–	6	–	1
Erskine	1	–	5	–	0	1	–	9	–	0
Delta State	1	–	6	–	0	1	–	9	–	0
Wofford	0	–	2	–	3	1	–	5	–	3
Tampa	0	–	3	–	1	2	–	7	–	1
Jacksonville State	0	–	3	–	1	0	–	8	–	2
Transylvania	0	–	7	–	0	1	–	8	–	0
Emory and Henry	0	–	0	–	0	7	–	2	–	0
$ – Conference champion

The 1939 Louisiana Tech Bulldogs football team was an American football team that represented the Louisiana Polytechnic Institute (now known as Louisiana Tech University) as a member of the Louisiana Intercollegiate Conference (LIC) and the Southern Intercollegiate Athletic Association (SIAA) during the 1939 college football season. In their first and only year under head coach Ray E. Davis, the Bulldogs compiled an overall record of 5–6 record. Louisiana Tech has a record of 3–4 against SIAA opponents.

Louisiana Tech was ranked at No. 246 (out of 609 teams) in the final Litkenhous Ratings for 1939.

== Schedule ==
Date	Time	Opponent	Site	Result	Attendance	Source
September 15		Arkansas A&M*	Tech Stadium; Ruston, LA	W 32–0	5,000	
September 23		Illinois Wesleyan*	Tech Stadium; Ruston, LA	W 12–7		
September 30		Jacksonville State	Tech Stadium; Ruston, LA	W 39–0		
October 7		at Western Kentucky State Teachers	Western Stadium; Bowling Green, KY	L 7–20	4,500	
October 13		at Birmingham–Southern*	Legion Field; Birmingham, AL	L 6–7		
October 21		vs. Louisiana Normal	State Fair Stadium; Shreveport, LA (rivalry)	L 0–26	7,500	
October 27	8:00 p.m.	Tampa	Tech Stadium; Ruston, LA	W 13–0	3,500	
November 4		Southwestern Louisiana	Tech Stadium; Ruston, LA (rivalry)	L 6–12	5,000	
November 11		at Louisiana College	Alumni Field; Pineville, LA	W 10–9		
November 18		at Texas Mines*	Kidd Field; El Paso, TX	L 0–27	5,500	
November 30		Centenary	Tech Stadium; Ruston, LA	L 0–19		
*Non-conference game; All times are in Central time
