= 1939 Mercer Bears football team =

American college football season

1939 Mercer Bears football
- Conference: Dixie Conference
- Record: 3–7 (1–3 Dixie)
- Head coach: Lake Russell (11th season)
- Home stadium: Centennial Stadium

1939 Dixie Conference football standings
	Conf.					Overall
Team	W		L		T	W		L		T
Southwestern (TN)	2	–	0	–	0	3	–	5	–	1
Loyola (LA) $	3	–	1	–	0	5	–	5	–	0
Mississippi College	3	–	1	–	1	6	–	1	–	1
Chattanooga	2	–	1	–	1	5	–	2	–	1
Millsaps	2	–	1	–	1	4	–	3	–	2
Birmingham–Southern	2	–	3	–	1	3	–	5	–	1
Howard (AL)	2	–	3	–	1	3	–	6	–	1
Mercer	1	–	3	–	0	3	–	7	–	0
Spring Hill	0	–	4	–	1	1	–	7	–	1
$ – Conference champion

The 1939 Mercer Bears football team was an American football team that represented Mercer University as a member of the Dixie Conference during the 1939 college football season. In their eleventh year under head coach Lake Russell, the team compiled a 3–7 record.

== Schedule ==
Date	Opponent	Site	Result	Attendance	Source
September 23	at Wofford*	Snyder Field; Spartanburg, SC	W 12–0	2,000	
September 29	Presbyterian*	Centennial Stadium; Macon, GA	L 0–7		
October 6	Carson–Newman*	Centennial Stadium; Macon, GA	W 7–0		
October 14	at Alabama*	Denny Stadium; Tuscaloosa, AL	L 0–20	5,000	
October 21	Birmingham–Southern	Centennial Stadium; Macon, GA	W 10–0	4,500	
October 28	at No. 1 Tennessee*	Shields–Watkins Field; Knoxville, TN	L 0–17	6,000	
November 3	at Georgia*	Sanford Stadium; Athens, GA	L 9–16	6,000	
November 10	at Mississippi College	Provine Field; Clinton, MS	L 0–15		
November 16	Howard (AL)	Albany, GA	L 3–7	3,500	
November 30	at Chattanooga	Chamberlain Field; Chattanooga, TN	L 18–21	5,240	
*Non-conference game; Rankings from AP Poll released prior to the game
