= 1939 Centenary Gentlemen football team =

American college football season

1939 Centenary Gentlemen football
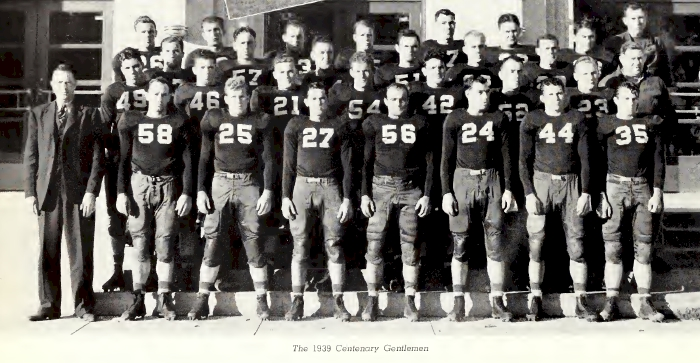
- Conference: Southern Intercollegiate Athletic Association
- Record: 2–9–1 (1–1 SIAA)
- Head coach: Curtis Parker (6th season)
- Home stadium: Centenary College Stadium

1939 Southern Intercollegiate Athletic Association football standings
	Conf.					Overall
Team	W		L		T	W		L		T
Louisiana Normal $	7	–	0	–	0	11	–	0	–	0
Tennessee Tech	4	–	0	–	0	6	–	3	–	1
Mississippi College	3	–	0	–	0	6	–	1	–	1
Miami (FL)	2	–	0	–	0	5	–	5	–	0
Rollins	5	–	1	–	0	10	–	1	–	0
Western Kentucky State Teachers	5	–	1	–	1	7	–	1	–	1
Mississippi State Teachers	4	–	1	–	0	4	–	2	–	3
Murray State	4	–	1	–	1	4	–	4	–	1
Newberry	3	–	1	–	1	4	–	1	–	4
Presbyterian	3	–	1	–	2	4	–	3	–	2
Georgetown (KY)	2	–	1	–	1	4	–	4	–	1
Eastern Kentucky	3	–	2	–	0	6	–	3	–	0
Union (TN)	3	–	2	–	0	7	–	2	–	0
Morehead State	2	–	2	–	0	6	–	2	–	0
Louisville	1	–	1	–	1	5	–	2	–	1
Union (KY)	1	–	1	–	1	3	–	3	–	1
Oglethorpe	3	–	3	–	1	3	–	4	–	1
Centre	1	–	1	–	1	1	–	5	–	2
Centenary	1	–	1	–	0	2	–	9	–	1
Louisiana Tech	3	–	4	–	0	5	–	6	–	0
West Tennessee State Teachers	3	–	4	–	0	3	–	8	–	0
Troy State	2	–	3	–	0	7	–	4	–	0
SW Louisiana	2	–	3	–	0	3	–	5	–	1
Stetson	2	–	4	–	2	3	–	5	–	2
Louisiana College	2	–	5	–	0	4	–	6	–	1
Middle Tennessee State Teachers	1	–	5	–	1	1	–	6	–	1
Erskine	1	–	5	–	0	1	–	9	–	0
Delta State	1	–	6	–	0	1	–	9	–	0
Wofford	0	–	2	–	3	1	–	5	–	3
Tampa	0	–	3	–	1	2	–	7	–	1
Jacksonville State	0	–	3	–	1	0	–	8	–	2
Transylvania	0	–	7	–	0	1	–	8	–	0
Emory and Henry	0	–	0	–	0	7	–	2	–	0
$ – Conference champion

The 1939 Centenary Gentlemen football team was an American football team that represented the Centenary College of Louisiana as a member of the Southern Intercollegiate Athletic Association during the 1939 college football season. In their sixth year under head coach Curtis Parker, the team compiled a 2–9–1 record.

Centenary was ranked at No. 116 (out of 609 teams) in the final Litkenhous Ratings for 1939.

== Schedule ==
Date	Opponent	Site	Result	Attendance	Source
September 16	Louisiana Normal	Centenary College Stadium; Shreveport, LA	L 0–15		
September 23	Hardin–Simmons*	Centenary College Stadium; Shreveport, LA	L 6–7		
September 30	at Texas A&M*	Kyle Field; College Station, TX	L 0–14	10,000	
October 7	at Rice*	Rice Field; Houston, TX	L 0–13		
October 14	Ole Miss*	Centenary College Stadium; Shreveport, LA	L 0–34	7,500	
October 21	at Tulsa*	Skelly Field; Tulsa, OK	L 7–15	9,500	
October 28	TCU*	Centenary College Stadium; Shreveport, LA	L 0–21		
November 4	at Arizona*	Arizona Stadium; Tucson, AZ	L 0–7		
November 11	Texas Tech*	Centenary College Stadium; Shreveport, LA	T 0–0		
November 18	Baylor*	Centenary College Stadium; Shreveport, LA	L 6–13		
November 25	Southwestern (TN)*	Centenary College Stadium; Shreveport, LA	W 13–7		
November 30	at Louisiana Tech	Tech Stadium; Ruston, LA	W 19–0		
*Non-conference game
