= 1939 Mississippi College Choctaws football team =

American college football season

1939 Mississippi College Choctaws football
- Conference: Dixie Conference, Southern Intercollegiate Athletic Association
- Record: 6–1–1 (3–1–1 Dixie, 3–0 SIAA)
- Head coach: Stanley L. Robinson (15th season)
- Home stadium: Provine Field

1939 Dixie Conference football standings
	Conf.					Overall
Team	W		L		T	W		L		T
Southwestern (TN)	2	–	0	–	0	3	–	5	–	1
Loyola (LA) $	3	–	1	–	0	5	–	5	–	0
Mississippi College	3	–	1	–	1	6	–	1	–	1
Chattanooga	2	–	1	–	1	5	–	2	–	1
Millsaps	2	–	1	–	1	4	–	3	–	2
Birmingham–Southern	2	–	3	–	1	3	–	5	–	1
Howard (AL)	2	–	3	–	1	3	–	6	–	1
Mercer	1	–	3	–	0	3	–	7	–	0
Spring Hill	0	–	4	–	1	1	–	7	–	1
$ – Conference champion

1939 Southern Intercollegiate Athletic Association football standings
	Conf.					Overall
Team	W		L		T	W		L		T
Louisiana Normal $	7	–	0	–	0	11	–	0	–	0
Tennessee Tech	4	–	0	–	0	6	–	3	–	1
Mississippi College	3	–	0	–	0	6	–	1	–	1
Miami (FL)	2	–	0	–	0	5	–	5	–	0
Rollins	5	–	1	–	0	10	–	1	–	0
Western Kentucky State Teachers	5	–	1	–	1	7	–	1	–	1
Mississippi State Teachers	4	–	1	–	0	4	–	2	–	3
Murray State	4	–	1	–	1	4	–	4	–	1
Newberry	3	–	1	–	1	4	–	1	–	4
Presbyterian	3	–	1	–	2	4	–	3	–	2
Georgetown (KY)	2	–	1	–	1	4	–	4	–	1
Eastern Kentucky	3	–	2	–	0	6	–	3	–	0
Union (TN)	3	–	2	–	0	7	–	2	–	0
Morehead State	2	–	2	–	0	6	–	2	–	0
Louisville	1	–	1	–	1	5	–	2	–	1
Union (KY)	1	–	1	–	1	3	–	3	–	1
Oglethorpe	3	–	3	–	1	3	–	4	–	1
Centre	1	–	1	–	1	1	–	5	–	2
Centenary	1	–	1	–	0	2	–	9	–	1
Louisiana Tech	3	–	4	–	0	5	–	6	–	0
West Tennessee State Teachers	3	–	4	–	0	3	–	8	–	0
Troy State	2	–	3	–	0	7	–	4	–	0
SW Louisiana	2	–	3	–	0	3	–	5	–	1
Stetson	2	–	4	–	2	3	–	5	–	2
Louisiana College	2	–	5	–	0	4	–	6	–	1
Middle Tennessee State Teachers	1	–	5	–	1	1	–	6	–	1
Erskine	1	–	5	–	0	1	–	9	–	0
Delta State	1	–	6	–	0	1	–	9	–	0
Wofford	0	–	2	–	3	1	–	5	–	3
Tampa	0	–	3	–	1	2	–	7	–	1
Jacksonville State	0	–	3	–	1	0	–	8	–	2
Transylvania	0	–	7	–	0	1	–	8	–	0
Emory and Henry	0	–	0	–	0	7	–	2	–	0
$ – Conference champion

The 1939 Mississippi College Choctaws football team was an American football team that represented Mississippi College as a member of the Dixie Conference and the Southern Intercollegiate Athletic Association (SIAA) in the 1939 college football season. Led by Stanley L. Robinson in his 15th season as head coach, the team compiled an overall record of 6–1–1 and with a mark of 3–1–1 in Dixie Conference play and 3–0 against SIAA competition.

== Schedule ==
Date	Opponent	Site	Result	Attendance	Source
September 30	at Centre	Farris Stadium; Danville, KY	W 7–0		
October 6	Chattanooga	Provine Field; Clinton, MS	T 0–0		
October 13	at Loyola (LA)	Loyola University Stadium; New Orleans, LA	L 0–32	5,000	
October 20	Spring Hill	Provine Field; Clinton, MS	W 25–7		
November 2	vs. Millsaps	Municipal Stadium; Jackson, MS (rivalry)	W 29–0	3,000	
November 10	Mercer	Provine Field; Clinton, MS	W 15–0		
November 18	at Louisiana College	Alumni Stadium; Pineville, LA	W 20–7		
November 25	at Oglethorpe*	Hermance Stadium; North Atlanta, GA	W 14–6		
*Non-conference game
