= 1939 Loyola Wolf Pack football team =

American college football season

1939 Loyola Wolf Pack football

Dixie Conference Champions
- Conference: Dixie Conference
- Record: 5–5 (3–1 Dixie)
- Head coach: Larry Mullins (3rd season)
- Home stadium: Loyola University Stadium

1939 Dixie Conference football standings
	Conf.					Overall
Team	W		L		T	W		L		T
Southwestern (TN)	2	–	0	–	0	3	–	5	–	1
Loyola (LA) $	3	–	1	–	0	5	–	5	–	0
Mississippi College	3	–	1	–	1	6	–	1	–	1
Chattanooga	2	–	1	–	1	5	–	2	–	1
Millsaps	2	–	1	–	1	4	–	3	–	2
Birmingham–Southern	2	–	3	–	1	3	–	5	–	1
Howard (AL)	2	–	3	–	1	3	–	6	–	1
Mercer	1	–	3	–	0	3	–	7	–	0
Spring Hill	0	–	4	–	1	1	–	7	–	1
$ – Conference champion

The 1939 Loyola Wolf Pack football team was an American football team that represented Loyola College of New Orleans (now known as Loyola University New Orleans) as a member of the Dixie Conference during the 1939 college football season. In their third season under head coach Larry Mullins, the team compiled a 5–5 record. Loyola was awarded the 1939 Dixie Conference Championship, as they completed the requisite number of games to become eligible for the award. At the conclusion of the season, Loyola discontinued the football program citing financial losses.

== Schedule ==
Date	Opponent	Site	Result	Attendance	Source
September 29	Louisiana College*	Loyola University Stadium; New Orleans, LA	W 7–0	6,000	
October 6	Birmingham–Southern	Loyola University Stadium; New Orleans, LA	W 7–6		
October 13	Mississippi College	Loyola University Stadium; New Orleans, LA	W 32–0	5,000	
October 21	at LSU*	Tiger Stadium; Baton Rouge, LA	L 0–20	10,000	
October 28	at Creighton*	Creighton Stadium; Omaha, NE	L 13–21		
November 3	Southwestern (TN)	Loyola University Stadium; New Orleans, LA	L 0–20		
November 10	at Southwestern Louisiana*	Campus Athletic Field; Lafayette, LA	W 20–18	5,000	
November 18	at Catholic University*	Brookland Stadium; Washington, DC	L 0–34	4,000	
November 23	Spring Hill	Loyola University Stadium; New Orleans, LA	W 13–7	5,000	
December 1	Texas Tech*	Loyola University Stadium; New Orleans, LA	L 0–13	3,500	
*Non-conference game
