= 1939 Western Kentucky State Teachers Hilltoppers football team =

American college football season

1939 Western Kentucky State Teachers Hilltoppers football

KIAC co-champion
- Conference: Kentucky Intercollegiate Athletic Conference, Southern Intercollegiate Athletic Association
- Record: 7–1–1 (2–0–1 KIAC, 5–1–1 SIAA)
- Head coach: Gander Terry (2nd season)
- Captain: Sam Panepinto
- Alternate captain: Waddell Murphy
- Home stadium: Western Stadium

1939 Kentucky Intercollegiate Athletic Conference football standings
	Conf.					Overall
Team	W		L		T	W		L		T
Western Kentucky State Teachers +	2	–	0	–	1	7	–	1	–	1
Murray State +	2	–	0	–	1	4	–	4	–	1
Centre	1	–	0	–	1	1	–	5	–	2
Georgetown (KY)	2	–	1	–	1	4	–	4	–	1
Eastern Kentucky	3	–	2	–	0	6	–	3	–	0
Morehead State	2	–	2	–	0	6	–	2	–	0
Louisville	1	–	1	–	1	5	–	2	–	1
Union (KY)	1	–	1	–	1	3	–	3	–	1
Transylvania	0	–	7	–	0	1	–	8	–	0
+ – Conference co-champions

1939 Southern Intercollegiate Athletic Association football standings
	Conf.					Overall
Team	W		L		T	W		L		T
Louisiana Normal $	7	–	0	–	0	11	–	0	–	0
Tennessee Tech	4	–	0	–	0	6	–	3	–	1
Mississippi College	3	–	0	–	0	6	–	1	–	1
Miami (FL)	2	–	0	–	0	5	–	5	–	0
Rollins	5	–	1	–	0	10	–	1	–	0
Western Kentucky State Teachers	5	–	1	–	1	7	–	1	–	1
Mississippi State Teachers	4	–	1	–	0	4	–	2	–	3
Murray State	4	–	1	–	1	4	–	4	–	1
Newberry	3	–	1	–	1	4	–	1	–	4
Presbyterian	3	–	1	–	2	4	–	3	–	2
Georgetown (KY)	2	–	1	–	1	4	–	4	–	1
Eastern Kentucky	3	–	2	–	0	6	–	3	–	0
Union (TN)	3	–	2	–	0	7	–	2	–	0
Morehead State	2	–	2	–	0	6	–	2	–	0
Louisville	1	–	1	–	1	5	–	2	–	1
Union (KY)	1	–	1	–	1	3	–	3	–	1
Oglethorpe	3	–	3	–	1	3	–	4	–	1
Centre	1	–	1	–	1	1	–	5	–	2
Centenary	1	–	1	–	0	2	–	9	–	1
Louisiana Tech	3	–	4	–	0	5	–	6	–	0
West Tennessee State Teachers	3	–	4	–	0	3	–	8	–	0
Troy State	2	–	3	–	0	7	–	4	–	0
SW Louisiana	2	–	3	–	0	3	–	5	–	1
Stetson	2	–	4	–	2	3	–	5	–	2
Louisiana College	2	–	5	–	0	4	–	6	–	1
Middle Tennessee State Teachers	1	–	5	–	1	1	–	6	–	1
Erskine	1	–	5	–	0	1	–	9	–	0
Delta State	1	–	6	–	0	1	–	9	–	0
Wofford	0	–	2	–	3	1	–	5	–	3
Tampa	0	–	3	–	1	2	–	7	–	1
Jacksonville State	0	–	3	–	1	0	–	8	–	2
Transylvania	0	–	7	–	0	1	–	8	–	0
Emory and Henry	0	–	0	–	0	7	–	2	–	0
$ – Conference champion

The 1939 Western Kentucky State Teachers Hilltoppers football team represented Western Kentucky State Teachers College—now known as Western Kentucky University—as a member of the Kentucky Intercollegiate Athletic Conference (KIAC) and the Southern Intercollegiate Athletic Association (SIAA) during the 1939 college football season. Led by second-year head coach Gander Terry, the Hilltoppers compiled an overall record of 7–1–1 with marks of 2–0–1 in KIAC play and of 5–1–1 against SIAA opponents. Western Kentucky State Teachers shared the KIAC title with Murray State, which the Hilltoppers played to a tie in the season finale.

Sam Panepinto was the team's captain and Waddell Murphy was the alternate captain. Western Kentucky was ranked at No. 150 (out of 609 teams) in the final Litkenhous Ratings for 1939.

== Schedule ==
Date	Opponent	Site	Result	Attendance	Source
September 23	at Ohio*	Ohio Stadium; Athens, OH	W 14–7		
September 30	at Morehead State	Western Stadium; Bowling Green, KY	W 2–0		
October 7	Louisiana Tech^{†}	Western Stadium; Bowling Green, KY	W 30–7	4,500	
October 13	at Tennessee Tech	Overhill Field; Cookeville, TN	L 0–10		
October 21	at West Tennessee State Teachers	Crump Stadium; Memphis, TN	W 12–0		
October 28	Middle Tennessee State Teachers	Western Stadium; Bowling Green, KY (rivalry)	W 26–2		
November 4	at Western State Teachers*	Waldo Stadium; Kalamazoo, MI	W 20–14		
November 11	Eastern Kentucky	Western Stadium; Bowling Green, KY (rivalry)	W 26–0		
November 25	Murray State	Western Stadium; Bowling Green, KY (rivalry)	T 12–12	5,000–6,900	
*Non-conference game; ^{†}Homecoming
