= 1939 Tampa Spartans football team =

American college football season

1939 Tampa Spartans football
- Conference: Southern Intercollegiate Athletic Association
- Record: 2–7–1 (0–3–1 SIAA)
- Head coach: Nash Higgins (7th season)
- Home stadium: Phillips Field

1939 Southern Intercollegiate Athletic Association football standings
	Conf.					Overall
Team	W		L		T	W		L		T
Louisiana Normal $	7	–	0	–	0	11	–	0	–	0
Tennessee Tech	4	–	0	–	0	6	–	3	–	1
Mississippi College	3	–	0	–	0	6	–	1	–	1
Miami (FL)	2	–	0	–	0	5	–	5	–	0
Rollins	5	–	1	–	0	10	–	1	–	0
Western Kentucky State Teachers	5	–	1	–	1	7	–	1	–	1
Mississippi State Teachers	4	–	1	–	0	4	–	2	–	3
Murray State	4	–	1	–	1	4	–	4	–	1
Newberry	3	–	1	–	1	4	–	1	–	4
Presbyterian	3	–	1	–	2	4	–	3	–	2
Georgetown (KY)	2	–	1	–	1	4	–	4	–	1
Eastern Kentucky	3	–	2	–	0	6	–	3	–	0
Union (TN)	3	–	2	–	0	7	–	2	–	0
Morehead State	2	–	2	–	0	6	–	2	–	0
Louisville	1	–	1	–	1	5	–	2	–	1
Union (KY)	1	–	1	–	1	3	–	3	–	1
Oglethorpe	3	–	3	–	1	3	–	4	–	1
Centre	1	–	1	–	1	1	–	5	–	2
Centenary	1	–	1	–	0	2	–	9	–	1
Louisiana Tech	3	–	4	–	0	5	–	6	–	0
West Tennessee State Teachers	3	–	4	–	0	3	–	8	–	0
Troy State	2	–	3	–	0	7	–	4	–	0
SW Louisiana	2	–	3	–	0	3	–	5	–	1
Stetson	2	–	4	–	2	3	–	5	–	2
Louisiana College	2	–	5	–	0	4	–	6	–	1
Middle Tennessee State Teachers	1	–	5	–	1	1	–	6	–	1
Erskine	1	–	5	–	0	1	–	9	–	0
Delta State	1	–	6	–	0	1	–	9	–	0
Wofford	0	–	2	–	3	1	–	5	–	3
Tampa	0	–	3	–	1	2	–	7	–	1
Jacksonville State	0	–	3	–	1	0	–	8	–	2
Transylvania	0	–	7	–	0	1	–	8	–	0
Emory and Henry	0	–	0	–	0	7	–	2	–	0
$ – Conference champion

The 1939 Tampa Spartans football team represented the University of Tampa as a member the Southern Intercollegiate Athletic Association (SIAA) during the 1939 college football season. Led by seventh-year head coach Nash Higgins, the Spartans compiled an overall record of 2–7–1 with a mark of 0–3–1 in conference play.

== Schedule ==
Date	Time	Opponent	Site	Result	Attendance	Source
September 22	8:00 p.m.	South Georgia*	Phillips Field; Tampa, FL	W 27–0	3,000	
September 30	8:30 p.m.	at Cincinnati*	Nippert Stadium; Cincinnati, OH	L 7–26		
October 14	8:30 p.m.	Miami (FL)^{†}	Phillips Field; Tampa, FL	L 7–32	7,000–8,500	
October 21	8:00 p.m.	at Florida*	Florida Field; Gainesville, FL	L 0–7	6,000	
October 27	9:00 p.m.	at Louisiana Tech	Tech Stadium; Ruston, LA	L 0–13	3,500	
November 3	8:00 p.m.	Stetson	Phillips Field; Tampa, FL	T 0–0	3,500	
November 17	8:00 p.m.	Rollins	Phillips Field; Tampa, FL	L 0–46	3,000	
December 1	8:00 p.m.	Boston University*	Phillips Field; Tampa, FL	L 0–12	4,000	
December 27	9:00 p.m.	vs. Rollins*	Havana University stadium; Havana, Cuba	L 13–26	4,000	
December 30		at University of Havana*	Havana University stadium; Havana, Cuba	W 28–6		
*Non-conference game; ^{†}Homecoming; All times are in Eastern time
