= 1939 Howard Bulldogs football team =

American college football season

1939 Howard Bulldogs football
- Conference: Dixie Conference
- Record: 3–6–1 (2–3–1 Dixie)
- Head coach: Billy Bancroft (5th season)
- Home stadium: Legion Field

1939 Dixie Conference football standings
	Conf.					Overall
Team	W		L		T	W		L		T
Southwestern (TN)	2	–	0	–	0	3	–	5	–	1
Loyola (LA) $	3	–	1	–	0	5	–	5	–	0
Mississippi College	3	–	1	–	1	6	–	1	–	1
Chattanooga	2	–	1	–	1	5	–	2	–	1
Millsaps	2	–	1	–	1	4	–	3	–	2
Birmingham–Southern	2	–	3	–	1	3	–	5	–	1
Howard (AL)	2	–	3	–	1	3	–	6	–	1
Mercer	1	–	3	–	0	3	–	7	–	0
Spring Hill	0	–	4	–	1	1	–	7	–	1
$ – Conference champion

The 1939 Howard Bulldogs football team was an American football team that represented Howard College (now known as the Samford University) as a member of the Dixie Conference during the 1939 college football season. In their fifth year under head coach Billy Bancroft, the team compiled a 3–6–1 record.

== Schedule ==
Date	Opponent	Site	Result	Attendance	Source
September 23	at Mississippi State*	Scott Field; Starkville, MS	L 0–45		
September 30	at Alabama*	Denny Stadium; Tuscaloosa, AL	L 0–21	6,000	
October 7	Millsaps	Legion Field; Birmingham, AL	L 6–7		
October 14	at Georgia Tech*	Grant Field; Atlanta, GA	L 0–35	10,000	
October 21	Chattanooga	Legion Field; Birmingham, AL	W 33–14	4,000	
October 27	at Spring Hill	Dorn Stadium; Mobile, AL	T 0–0	3,500	
November 4	at Murray State*	Cutchin Stadium; Murray, KY	W 7–0	4,000	
November 11	at Southwestern (TN)	Crump Stadium; Memphis, TN	L 6–13		
November 16	at Mercer	Albany, GA	W 7–3	3,500	
November 30	vs. Birmingham–Southern	Legion Field; Birmingham, AL	L 6–9	8,000	
*Non-conference game
