= Larry Mullins (American football) =

American football player, coach, and athletic director (1908–1968)

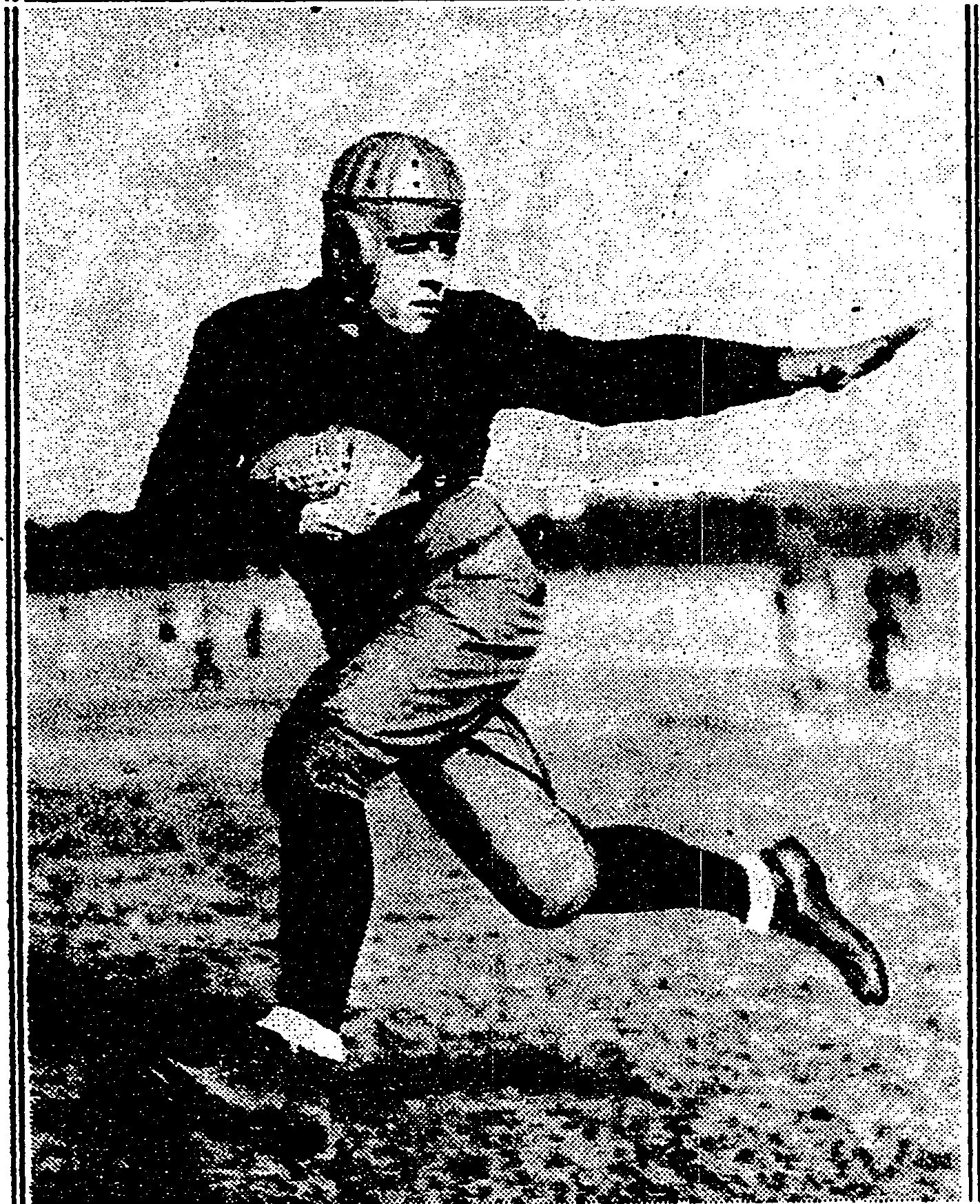
- Mullins in 1929

Biographical details
- Born: June 13, 1908; South Pasadena, California, U.S.
- Died: August 10, 1968 (aged 60); Chicago, Illinois, U.S.

Playing career
- 1927–1930: Notre Dame
- Position: Fullback

Coaching career (HC unless noted)
- 1931: Kansas (backs)
- 1932–1936: St. Benedict's
- 1937–1939: Loyola (LA)
- 1940: St. Ambrose
- 1941: Florida (backs)
- 1943: Iowa Pre-Flight (backs)
- 1945: Corpus Christi NAS
- 1947–1950: St. Ambrose

Administrative career (AD unless noted)
- 1931–1937: St. Benedict's
- 1944: Iowa Pre-Flight
- 1951–1956: Kansas State
- 1956–1962: Marquette

Head coaching record
- Overall: 96–29–3

Accomplishments and honors

Championships
- 2 Midlands (1948–1949); 1 Iowa Conference (1950); 1 Iowa Conference Southern Division (1950)

Laurence A. "Moon" Mullins (June 13, 1908 – August 10, 1968) was an American college football player, coach and athletic director. He played fullback under Knute Rockne at the University of Notre Dame. He served as the head coach at St. Benedict's College from 1932 to 1936, Loyola University of New Orleans from 1937 to 1939, and St. Ambrose University in 1940 and 1947 to 1950. Mullins was the athletic director at Kansas State University and Marquette University.

== Early life ==
Mullins was born in South Pasadena, California on June 13, 1908. He attended the University of Notre Dame, where he played on the football team under head coach Knute Rockne as a fullback from 1928 to 1930. The 1929 and 1930 teams won consecutive national championships, and those teams finished with perfect untied and undefeated records. He graduated from the school with a Bachelor of Arts degree in 1931. Mullins was one of 6 team members to carry Knute Rocknes' casket to the grave .(Ref Find Grave.com)

== Coaching career ==
After college, Mullins began his coaching career at the University of Kansas. His first position was as the backfield assistant under head coach Homer Woodson Hargiss in 1931 for a salary of $4,000. The following season, he became head football coach and athletic director at St. Benedict's, a small college in Atchison, Kansas with 600 students at the time, for a salary of about $3,500. While there, he led his teams to a 38–5–1 record. Kansas accounted for two of the five losses. His final season there in 1936, St. Benedict's finished undefeated and untied.

In January 1937, the Loyola University of New Orleans hired Mullins as its head coach. During his three-year tenure, he compiled an 11–16–1 record at Loyola. The Wolves finished the 1939 season with a 5–5 mark, which was sufficient to capture the Dixie Conference championship. In December 1939, he announced that he would not seek renewal of his expiring contract. Two weeks later, the school discontinued its football program. In 1940, he became head coach at St. Ambrose University in Davenport, Iowa, where he led the football team to an undefeated season.

After American entry into World War II, Mullins entered the United States Navy Reserve. He was sworn in as a lieutenant senior grade in Jacksonville, Florida on March 23, 1942, and then attended a month-long course in Annapolis, Maryland prior to service in the Navy's physical training program. The following year, he assisted Lieutenant Colonel Bernie Bierman, the athletic director and football coach at the Iowa Preflight School. During the 1943 season, he served as the Iowa Pre-Flight backfield coach. By December 1944, Mullins had attained the rank of lieutenant commander and was Iowa Pre-Flight athletic director. In August 1945, he was made a staff officer of the Naval Air Intermediate Training Command in Corpus Christi, Texas. While there, Mullins coached the Naval Air Station football team.

On November 5, 1945, Santa Clara University appointed him as its head coach of its football program, which had been temporarily suspended during the war. However, Mullins tendered his resignation on May 7, 1946, after his abortive five-month search for a residence for his wife and six children in the midst of housing shortage. Mullins returned to Corpus Christi to enter the sporting goods business, but soon reentered the coaching ranks. In 1947, he returned to St. Ambrose, where he served for four more seasons. Mullins led the Bees to another undefeated finish in 1949 with an 8–0 record, and was named the "Little All-American Coach of the Year". In 1950, St. Ambrose finished 12–1. The grueling 13-game schedule culminated in a victory over Loras to capture the Iowa Intercollegiate Athletic Conference championship. Mullins' career total at the school was 40–7–1.

== Administrative career and later life ==
In February 1951, Kansas State University appointed Mullins as its athletic director with a $9,000 salary. In 1956, Mullins took the same position at Marquette University with a substantial pay raise. The university, which discontinued football and track in 1960, dismissed Mullins on January 31, 1962.

Mullins died of cancer in Chicago on August 10, 1968, at the age of 60. His body was interred in South Bend, Indiana.

== See also ==
- List of college football head coaches with non-consecutive tenure

== Head coaching record ==
Year	Team	Overall	Conference	Standing	Bowl/playoffs
St. Benedict's Ravens (Independent) (1932–1936)
1932	St. Benedict's	6–2			
1933	St. Benedict's	9–1			
1934	St. Benedict's	7–1–1			
1935	St. Benedict's	8–1			
1936	St. Benedict's	8–0			
St. Benedict's:		38–5–1			
Loyola Wolf Pack (Dixie Conference) (1937–1939)
1937	Loyola	2–6–1	1–2	6th	
1938	Loyola	4–5	2–1	T–3rd	
1939	Loyola	5–5	3–1	2nd	
Loyola:		11–16–1	6–4		
St. Ambrose Fighting Bees (Iowa Conference) (1940)
1940	St. Ambrose	8–0–1	2–0–1	2nd	
Corpus Christi Naval Air Station Comets (Independent) (1945)
1945	Corpus Christi NAS	7–1			
Corpus Christi NAS:		7–1			
St. Ambrose Fighting Bees (Iowa Conference) (1947)
1947	St. Ambrose	5–3	0–1	10th	
St. Ambrose Fighting Bees (Midlands Conference) (1948–1949)
1948	St. Ambrose	7–3	2–1	T–1st	
1949	St. Ambrose	8–0	3–0	1st	
St. Ambrose Fighting Bees (Iowa Conference / Midlands Conference) (1950)
1950	St. Ambrose	12–1	5–0 / 3–1	1st (Southern) / 2nd	
St. Ambrose:		40–7–1	15–3–1		
Total:		96–29–3			
National championship Conference title Conference division title or championship game berth
