= 1942 Louisville Cardinals football team =

American college football season

1942 Louisville Cardinals football
- Conference: Kentucky Intercollegiate Athletic Conference
- Record: 2–3 ( KIAC)
- Head coach: Laurie Apitz (7th season)
- Home stadium: Maxwell Field

The 1942 Louisville Cardinals football team was an American football team that represented the University of Louisville as a member of the Kentucky Intercollegiate Athletic Conference (KIAC) during the 1942 college football season. In their seventh and final season under head coach Laurie Apitz, the Cardinals compiled a 2–3 record.

Louisville was ranked at No. 473 (out of 590 college and military teams) in the final rankings under the Litkenhous Difference by Score System for 1942.

Louisville did not field a football team in 1943 or 1944 during the height of World War II.

== Schedule ==
Date	Time	Opponent	Site	Result	Attendance	Source
September 17	8:15 p.m.	Rio Grande	Maxwell Field; Louisville, KY	W 25–0		
September 26	7:30 p.m.	at Cincinnati	Nippert Stadium; Cincinnati, OH (rivalry)	L 0–51	2,500–3,000	
October 10		at Evansville	Enlow Field; Evansville, IN	W 20–0		
October 17		DePauw	Maxwell Field; Louisville, KY	L 6–19		
October 24	8:15 p.m.	Indiana State	Maxwell Field; Louisville, KY	L 7–25		
All times are in Central time
