= 1939 Louisville Cardinals football team =

American college football season

1939 Louisville Cardinals football
- Conference: Kentucky Intercollegiate Athletic Conference, Southern Intercollegiate Athletic Association
- Record: 5–2–1 (1–1–1 KIAC, 1–1–1 SIAA)
- Head coach: Laurie Apitz (4th season)
- Home stadium: Maxwell Field

1939 Kentucky Intercollegiate Athletic Conference football standings
| | Conf. | | | | | Overall |
| Team | W | | L | | T | W | | L | | T |
|---|---|---|---|---|---|---|---|---|---|---|
| Western Kentucky State Teachers + | 2 | – | 0 | – | 1 | 7 | – | 1 | – | 1 |
| Murray State + | 2 | – | 0 | – | 1 | 4 | – | 4 | – | 1 |
| Centre | 1 | – | 0 | – | 1 | 1 | – | 5 | – | 2 |
| Georgetown (KY) | 2 | – | 1 | – | 1 | 4 | – | 4 | – | 1 |
| Eastern Kentucky | 3 | – | 2 | – | 0 | 6 | – | 3 | – | 0 |
| Morehead State | 2 | – | 2 | – | 0 | 6 | – | 2 | – | 0 |
| Louisville | 1 | – | 1 | – | 1 | 5 | – | 2 | – | 1 |
| Union (KY) | 1 | – | 1 | – | 1 | 3 | – | 3 | – | 1 |
| Transylvania | 0 | – | 7 | – | 0 | 1 | – | 8 | – | 0 |
+ – Conference co-champions

1939 Southern Intercollegiate Athletic Association football standings
| | Conf. | | | | | Overall |
| Team | W | | L | | T | W | | L | | T |
|---|---|---|---|---|---|---|---|---|---|---|
| Louisiana Normal $ | 7 | – | 0 | – | 0 | 11 | – | 0 | – | 0 |
| Tennessee Tech | 4 | – | 0 | – | 0 | 6 | – | 3 | – | 1 |
| Mississippi College | 3 | – | 0 | – | 0 | 6 | – | 1 | – | 1 |
| Miami (FL) | 2 | – | 0 | – | 0 | 5 | – | 5 | – | 0 |
| Rollins | 5 | – | 1 | – | 0 | 10 | – | 1 | – | 0 |
| Western Kentucky State Teachers | 5 | – | 1 | – | 1 | 7 | – | 1 | – | 1 |
| Mississippi State Teachers | 4 | – | 1 | – | 0 | 4 | – | 2 | – | 3 |
| Murray State | 4 | – | 1 | – | 1 | 4 | – | 4 | – | 1 |
| Newberry | 3 | – | 1 | – | 1 | 4 | – | 1 | – | 4 |
| Presbyterian | 3 | – | 1 | – | 2 | 4 | – | 3 | – | 2 |
| Georgetown (KY) | 2 | – | 1 | – | 1 | 4 | – | 4 | – | 1 |
| Eastern Kentucky | 3 | – | 2 | – | 0 | 6 | – | 3 | – | 0 |
| Union (TN) | 3 | – | 2 | – | 0 | 7 | – | 2 | – | 0 |
| Morehead State | 2 | – | 2 | – | 0 | 6 | – | 2 | – | 0 |
| Louisville | 1 | – | 1 | – | 1 | 5 | – | 2 | – | 1 |
| Union (KY) | 1 | – | 1 | – | 1 | 3 | – | 3 | – | 1 |
| Oglethorpe | 3 | – | 3 | – | 1 | 3 | – | 4 | – | 1 |
| Centre | 1 | – | 1 | – | 1 | 1 | – | 5 | – | 2 |
| Centenary | 1 | – | 1 | – | 0 | 2 | – | 9 | – | 1 |
| Louisiana Tech | 3 | – | 4 | – | 0 | 5 | – | 6 | – | 0 |
| West Tennessee State Teachers | 3 | – | 4 | – | 0 | 3 | – | 8 | – | 0 |
| Troy State | 2 | – | 3 | – | 0 | 7 | – | 4 | – | 0 |
| SW Louisiana | 2 | – | 3 | – | 0 | 3 | – | 5 | – | 1 |
| Stetson | 2 | – | 4 | – | 2 | 3 | – | 5 | – | 2 |
| Louisiana College | 2 | – | 5 | – | 0 | 4 | – | 6 | – | 1 |
| Middle Tennessee State Teachers | 1 | – | 5 | – | 1 | 1 | – | 6 | – | 1 |
| Erskine | 1 | – | 5 | – | 0 | 1 | – | 9 | – | 0 |
| Delta State | 1 | – | 6 | – | 0 | 1 | – | 9 | – | 0 |
| Wofford | 0 | – | 2 | – | 3 | 1 | – | 5 | – | 3 |
| Tampa | 0 | – | 3 | – | 1 | 2 | – | 7 | – | 1 |
| Jacksonville State | 0 | – | 3 | – | 1 | 0 | – | 8 | – | 2 |
| Transylvania | 0 | – | 7 | – | 0 | 1 | – | 8 | – | 0 |
| Emory and Henry | 0 | – | 0 | – | 0 | 7 | – | 2 | – | 0 |
$ – Conference champion

The 1939 Louisville Cardinals football team was an American football team that represented the University of Louisville as a member of the Kentucky Intercollegiate Athletic Conference (KIAC) and the Southern Intercollegiate Athletic Association (SIAA) during the 1939 college football season. In their fourth season under head coach Laurie Apitz, the Cardinals compiled an overall record of 5–2–1 with a mark of 1–1–1 in both KIAC and SIAA play.

Louisville was ranked at No. 356 (out of 609 teams) in the final Litkenhous Ratings for 1939.

== Schedule ==
| Date | Opponent | Site | Result | Attendance | Source |
|---|---|---|---|---|---|
| September 22 | at Transylvania | Thomas Field; Lexington, KY | W 25–0 | 2,000 | |
| September 30 | at Indiana State* | Memorial Stadium; Terre Haute, IN | L 0–7 | 3,500 | |
| October 6 | Evansville* | Louisville, KY | W 7–6 | 5,000 | |
| October 13 | Alfred Holbrook* | Maxwell Field; Louisville, KY | W 20–3 | 3,500 | |
| October 19 | Saint Joseph's (IN)* | Louisville, KY | W 13–0 | 3,800 | |
| October 28 | at Centre | Danville, KY | T 0–0 | | |
| November 4 | at Georgetown (KY) | Georgetown, KY | L 7–14 | | |
| November 18 | Hanover*^{†} | Louisville, KY | W 20–0 | 3,800 | |
*Non-conference game; ^{†}Homecoming
