= Laurie Apitz =

American football player and sports coach

Biographical details
- Born: May 22, 1906; Bessemer, Michigan, U.S.
- Died: June 6, 1980 (aged 74); Walworth, Wisconsin, U.S.

Playing career

Football
- 1926–1927: Chicago

Track
- 1927–1928: Chicago
- Position: End (football)

Coaching career (HC unless noted)

Football
- 1929–1932: Chicago (assistant)
- 1933–1935: Pacific (CA) (line)
- 1936–1942: Louisville

Basketball
- 1933–1936: Pacific (CA)
- 1936–1940: Louisville

Administrative career (AD unless noted)
- 1936–1943: Louisville

Head coaching record
- Overall: 22–29–3 (football); 39–77 (basketball)

Lawrence Edward Apitz (May 22, 1906 – June 6, 1980) was an American football player, coach of football and basketball, and college athletics administrator. He served as the head football coach at the University of Louisville from 1936 to 1942, compiling a record of 22–29–3. Apitz was also the head basketball coach at the University of the Pacific in Stockton, California from 1933 to 1936 and at Louisville from 1936 to 1940, amassing a career college basketball record of 39–77. He was athletic director at Louisville from 1936 until 1943, when he resigned due to poor health.

A native of Bessemer, Michigan, Apitz was valedictorian of his high school class of 1924. He attended the University of Chicago, where he played football as an end and ran track. He was a third-team selection to the 1926 All-Big Ten Conference football team. Apitz died at the age of 74, on June 6, 1980, in Wisconsin.

== Head coaching record ==
=== Football ===
Year	Team	Overall	Conference	Standing	Bowl/playoffs
Louisville Cardinals (Kentucky Intercollegiate Athletic Conference / Southern Intercollegiate Athletic Association) (1936–1941)
1936	Louisville	4–4	2–2 / 2–3	6th / T–20th	
1937	Louisville	2–5–1	0–3–1 / 1–3–1	9th / T–23rd	
1938	Louisville	2–6	0–3 / 0–3	9th / T–29th	
1939	Louisville	5–2–1	1–1–1 / 1–1–1	T–6th / T–14th	
1940	Louisville	3–5–1	0–2 / 0–2	9th / T–28th	
1941	Louisville	4–4	1–1 / 1–1	/ T–14th	
Louisville Cardinals (Kentucky Intercollegiate Athletic Conference) (1942)
1942	Louisville	2–3			
Louisville:		22–29–3			
Total:		22–29–3			
