= 1936 CCNY Beavers football team =

American college football season

1936 CCNY Beavers football
- Conference: Independent
- Record: 4–4
- Head coach: Benny Friedman (3rd season)
- Home stadium: Lewisohn Stadium

1936 Eastern college football independents records
	Conf.			Overall
Team	W	L	T	W		L		T
Middlebury		–		8	–	0	–	0
Saint Anselm		–		6	–	0	–	1
No. 3 Pittsburgh		–		8	–	1	–	1
No. 10 Penn		–		7	–	1	–	0
No. 12 Yale		–		7	–	1	–	0
No. 13 Dartmouth		–		7	–	1	–	1
Franklin & Marshall		–		7	–	1	–	1
No. 14 Duquesne		–		8	–	2	–	0
Boston College		–		6	–	1	–	2
Boston University		–		5	–	1	–	2
No. 15 Fordham		–		5	–	1	–	2
Holy Cross		–		7	–	2	–	1
Villanova		–		7	–	2	–	1
Army		–		6	–	3	–	0
Colgate		–		6	–	3	–	0
Drexel		–		6	–	3	–	0
Temple		–		6	–	3	–	2
La Salle		–		6	–	3	–	1
Buffalo		–		5	–	3	–	0
Columbia		–		5	–	3	–	0
Princeton		–		4	–	2	–	2
Saint Vincent		–		5	–	3	–	0
NYU		–		5	–	3	–	1
Manhattan		–		6	–	4	–	0
Northeastern		–		5	–	4	–	0
Bucknell		–		4	–	4	–	1
CCNY		–		4	–	4	–	0
Tufts		–		3	–	3	–	1
Harvard		–		3	–	4	–	1
Cornell		–		3	–	5	–	0
Penn State		–		3	–	5	–	0
Westminster (PA)		–		2	–	4	–	1
Brown		–		3	–	7	–	0
Carnegie Tech		–		2	–	6	–	0
Massachusetts State		–		2	–	6	–	0
Providence		–		1	–	7	–	0
Syracuse		–		1	–	7	–	0
Vermont		–		1	–	8	–	0
Rankings from AP Poll

The 1936 CCNY Beavers football team represented the City College of New York (CCNY) during the 1936 college football season. In its third season under head coach Benny Friedman, the team compiled a record of 4–4.

== Schedule ==
Date	Opponent	Site	Result	Attendance	Source
October 3	Brooklyn	Lewisohn Stadium; New York, NY	W 6–0	3,000	
October 10	at Albright	Reading, PA	L 0–31		
October 17	Susquehanna	Lewisohn Stadium; New York, NY	W 6–0	2,000	
October 24	at Drexel	Drexel Field; Philadelphia, PA	W 6–0	4,000	
October 31	at Manhattan	Ebbets Field; Brooklyn, NY	L 7–28	6,000	
November 7	Gallaudet	Lewisohn Stadium; New York, NY	W 34–0		
November 14	at Saint Joseph's	Finnesey Field; Philadelphia, PA	L 0–13	5,000	
November 22	at NYU	Yankee Stadium; Bronx, NY	L 7–25	5,000	
