= 1936 Brown Bears football team =

American college football season

1936 Brown Bears football
- Conference: Independent
- Record: 3–7
- Head coach: Tuss McLaughry (11th season)
- Home stadium: Brown Stadium

1936 Eastern college football independents records
	Conf.			Overall
Team	W	L	T	W		L		T
Middlebury		–		8	–	0	–	0
Saint Anselm		–		6	–	0	–	1
No. 3 Pittsburgh		–		8	–	1	–	1
No. 10 Penn		–		7	–	1	–	0
No. 12 Yale		–		7	–	1	–	0
No. 13 Dartmouth		–		7	–	1	–	1
Franklin & Marshall		–		7	–	1	–	1
No. 14 Duquesne		–		8	–	2	–	0
Boston College		–		6	–	1	–	2
Boston University		–		5	–	1	–	2
No. 15 Fordham		–		5	–	1	–	2
Holy Cross		–		7	–	2	–	1
Villanova		–		7	–	2	–	1
Army		–		6	–	3	–	0
Colgate		–		6	–	3	–	0
Drexel		–		6	–	3	–	0
Temple		–		6	–	3	–	2
La Salle		–		6	–	3	–	1
Buffalo		–		5	–	3	–	0
Columbia		–		5	–	3	–	0
Princeton		–		4	–	2	–	2
Saint Vincent		–		5	–	3	–	0
NYU		–		5	–	3	–	1
Manhattan		–		6	–	4	–	0
Northeastern		–		5	–	4	–	0
Bucknell		–		4	–	4	–	1
CCNY		–		4	–	4	–	0
Tufts		–		3	–	3	–	1
Harvard		–		3	–	4	–	1
Cornell		–		3	–	5	–	0
Penn State		–		3	–	5	–	0
Westminster (PA)		–		2	–	4	–	1
Brown		–		3	–	7	–	0
Carnegie Tech		–		2	–	6	–	0
Massachusetts State		–		2	–	6	–	0
Providence		–		1	–	7	–	0
Syracuse		–		1	–	7	–	0
Vermont		–		1	–	8	–	0
Rankings from AP Poll

The 1936 Brown Bears football team represented Brown University as an independent during the 1936 college football season. Led by 11th-year head coach Tuss McLaughry, the Bears compiled a record of 3–7.

== Schedule ==
Date	Opponent	Site	Result	Attendance	Source
September 26	Connecticut State	Brown Stadium; Providence, RI	L 0–27		
October 3	Rhode Island State	Brown Stadium; Providence, RI (rivalry)	W 7–6		
October 10	at Harvard	Harvard Stadium; Boston, MA	L 0–28	8,000	
October 17	at Dartmouth	Memorial Field; Hanover, NH	L 0–34		
October 24	at Penn	Franklin Field; Philadelphia, PA	L 6–48		
October 31	Tufts	Brown Stadium; Providence, RI	W 38–7		
November 7	at Yale	Yale Bowl; New Haven, CT	L 6–14		
November 14	No. 17 Holy Cross	Brown Stadium; Providence, RI	L 0–17		
November 21	Colby	Brown Stadium; Providence, RI	W 19–6		
November 28	Colgate	Brown Stadium; Providence, RI	L 0–32		
Rankings from AP Poll released prior to the game
