= 1936 Drexel Dragons football team =

American college football season

1936 Drexel Dragons football
- Conference: Independent
- Record: 6–3
- Head coach: Walter Halas (10th season)
- Captain: Albert Fitzgerald
- Home stadium: Drexel Field

1936 Eastern college football independents records
	Conf.			Overall
Team	W	L	T	W		L		T
Middlebury		–		8	–	0	–	0
Saint Anselm		–		6	–	0	–	1
No. 3 Pittsburgh		–		8	–	1	–	1
No. 10 Penn		–		7	–	1	–	0
No. 12 Yale		–		7	–	1	–	0
No. 13 Dartmouth		–		7	–	1	–	1
Franklin & Marshall		–		7	–	1	–	1
No. 14 Duquesne		–		8	–	2	–	0
Boston College		–		6	–	1	–	2
Boston University		–		5	–	1	–	2
No. 15 Fordham		–		5	–	1	–	2
Holy Cross		–		7	–	2	–	1
Villanova		–		7	–	2	–	1
Army		–		6	–	3	–	0
Colgate		–		6	–	3	–	0
Drexel		–		6	–	3	–	0
Temple		–		6	–	3	–	2
La Salle		–		6	–	3	–	1
Buffalo		–		5	–	3	–	0
Columbia		–		5	–	3	–	0
Princeton		–		4	–	2	–	2
Saint Vincent		–		5	–	3	–	0
NYU		–		5	–	3	–	1
Manhattan		–		6	–	4	–	0
Northeastern		–		5	–	4	–	0
Bucknell		–		4	–	4	–	1
CCNY		–		4	–	4	–	0
Tufts		–		3	–	3	–	1
Harvard		–		3	–	4	–	1
Cornell		–		3	–	5	–	0
Penn State		–		3	–	5	–	0
Westminster (PA)		–		2	–	4	–	1
Brown		–		3	–	7	–	0
Carnegie Tech		–		2	–	6	–	0
Massachusetts State		–		2	–	6	–	0
Providence		–		1	–	7	–	0
Syracuse		–		1	–	7	–	0
Vermont		–		1	–	8	–	0
Rankings from AP Poll

1936 Drexel Dragons football team was head coached by Walter Halas.

== Schedule ==
Date	Opponent	Site	Result	Attendance	Source
September 26	at Juniata	Huntingdon, PA	W 34–7		
October 3	St. John's (MD)	Drexel Field; Philadelphia, PA	L 0–7		
October 10	Susquehanna	Drexel Field; Philadelphia, PA	W 19–12		
October 17	Lebanon Valley	Drexel Field; Philadelphia, PA	W 9–0		
October 24	CCNY	Drexel Field; Philadelphia, PA	L 0–6	4,000	
October 31	at Gettysburg	Gettysburg, PA	L 6–21		
November 7	at Ursinus	Patterson Field; Collegeville, PA	W 7–6		
November 14	at Delaware	Frazer Field; Newark, DE	W 7–6		
November 21	Swarthmore^{†}	Drexel Field; Philadelphia, PA	W 32–0		
^{†}Homecoming

== Roster ==
1936 Drexel Dragons football team roster
Players
Coaches
Offense

Pos.	#	Name	Class
TE	39	Matthew Donaldson	Jr
OT	1	Albert Fitzgerald (C)	Sr
G	21	Clinton Smullen	Sr
C	19	Joseph Rhile	Sr
G	27	George Stevens	Sr
OT	14	Edwin Ott
TE	30	Elwood Conard
HB	47	Harry Fox	Sr
HB	18	Walter Ehmling
FB	44	David Curry	Sr
QB	55	Kenneth Rodgers
C	16	Jack Bader
FB		George Baker
G	35	Horace Brosius
G	46	Isadore Caplan
HB	65	Edmund Carplick
HB	45	Arthur DiLarso
HB	18	Walter Ehmling
C	50	Burton Fagan
TE	17	Frederick Merrill
FB	25	George Goller	Sr
TE	26	Edward Hale
TE	33	Robert Hanna
C	12	William Harwick
OT	31	Frank J Jones
FB	48	William Lignelli
HB	9	George Nannos
HB	4	Robert Parks
HB	36	John Quinn
OT	11	William C Schaffer
OT	7	Martin Smolak
OT	75	Carl Speidel
HB	10	Sidney Stephens
QB	51	Ross Tippin	Sr
HB	5	Harry Wolf

Defense

Pos.	#	Name	Class

Special teams

Pos.	#	Name	Class

Head coach

- Walter Halas (Illinois)

Coordinators/assistant coaches

- Maury McMains (McDaniel)
- Albert H. Repscha (Maine)

Legend

- (C) Team captain
- (S) Suspended
- (I) Ineligible
- Injured
- Redshirt
