= 1936 Buffalo Bulls football team =

American college football season

1936 Buffalo Bulls football
- Conference: Independent
- Record: 5–3
- Head coach: Jim Peele (1st season)
- Captain: Ray Garlapow
- Home stadium: Rotary Field

1936 Eastern college football independents records
	Conf.			Overall
Team	W	L	T	W		L		T
Middlebury		–		8	–	0	–	0
Saint Anselm		–		6	–	0	–	1
No. 3 Pittsburgh		–		8	–	1	–	1
No. 10 Penn		–		7	–	1	–	0
No. 12 Yale		–		7	–	1	–	0
No. 13 Dartmouth		–		7	–	1	–	1
Franklin & Marshall		–		7	–	1	–	1
No. 14 Duquesne		–		8	–	2	–	0
Boston College		–		6	–	1	–	2
Boston University		–		5	–	1	–	2
No. 15 Fordham		–		5	–	1	–	2
Holy Cross		–		7	–	2	–	1
Villanova		–		7	–	2	–	1
Army		–		6	–	3	–	0
Colgate		–		6	–	3	–	0
Drexel		–		6	–	3	–	0
Temple		–		6	–	3	–	2
La Salle		–		6	–	3	–	1
Buffalo		–		5	–	3	–	0
Columbia		–		5	–	3	–	0
Princeton		–		4	–	2	–	2
Saint Vincent		–		5	–	3	–	0
NYU		–		5	–	3	–	1
Manhattan		–		6	–	4	–	0
Northeastern		–		5	–	4	–	0
Bucknell		–		4	–	4	–	1
CCNY		–		4	–	4	–	0
Tufts		–		3	–	3	–	1
Harvard		–		3	–	4	–	1
Cornell		–		3	–	5	–	0
Penn State		–		3	–	5	–	0
Westminster (PA)		–		2	–	4	–	1
Brown		–		3	–	7	–	0
Carnegie Tech		–		2	–	6	–	0
Massachusetts State		–		2	–	6	–	0
Providence		–		1	–	7	–	0
Syracuse		–		1	–	7	–	0
Vermont		–		1	–	8	–	0
Rankings from AP Poll

The 1936 Buffalo Bulls football team was an American football team that represented the University of Buffalo as an independent during the 1936 college football season. In their first season under head coach Jim Peele, the Bulls compiled a 5–3 record and were outscored by a total of 127 to 121. The team played its home games at Rotary Field in Buffalo, New York.

== Schedule ==
Date	Opponent	Site	Result	Attendance	Source
October 3	Defiance	Rotary Field; Buffalo, NY	W 26–6		
October 10	at Rochester	Rochester, NY	W 29–2		
October 17	at Alfred	Alfred, NY	W 27–0		
October 24	Hiram	Rotary Field; Buffalo, NY	W 19–12		
October 31	at Clarkson	Potsdam, NY	L 0–41		
November 7	Hobart	Rotary Field; Buffalo, NY	L 2–52		
November 14	at Wayne	Detroit, MI	L 6–14	3,000	
November 21	RPI	Rotary Field; Buffalo, NY	W 12–0		
