= 1936 Saint Vincent Bearcats football team =

American college football season

1936 Saint Vincent Bearcats football
- Conference: Independent
- Record: 5–3
- Head coach: Red Edwards (5th season)

1936 Eastern college football independents records
	Conf.			Overall
Team	W	L	T	W		L		T
Middlebury		–		8	–	0	–	0
Saint Anselm		–		6	–	0	–	1
No. 3 Pittsburgh		–		8	–	1	–	1
No. 10 Penn		–		7	–	1	–	0
No. 12 Yale		–		7	–	1	–	0
No. 13 Dartmouth		–		7	–	1	–	1
Franklin & Marshall		–		7	–	1	–	1
No. 14 Duquesne		–		8	–	2	–	0
Boston College		–		6	–	1	–	2
Boston University		–		5	–	1	–	2
No. 15 Fordham		–		5	–	1	–	2
Holy Cross		–		7	–	2	–	1
Villanova		–		7	–	2	–	1
Army		–		6	–	3	–	0
Colgate		–		6	–	3	–	0
Drexel		–		6	–	3	–	0
Temple		–		6	–	3	–	2
La Salle		–		6	–	3	–	1
Buffalo		–		5	–	3	–	0
Columbia		–		5	–	3	–	0
Princeton		–		4	–	2	–	2
Saint Vincent		–		5	–	3	–	0
NYU		–		5	–	3	–	1
Manhattan		–		6	–	4	–	0
Northeastern		–		5	–	4	–	0
Bucknell		–		4	–	4	–	1
CCNY		–		4	–	4	–	0
Tufts		–		3	–	3	–	1
Harvard		–		3	–	4	–	1
Cornell		–		3	–	5	–	0
Penn State		–		3	–	5	–	0
Westminster (PA)		–		2	–	4	–	1
Brown		–		3	–	7	–	0
Carnegie Tech		–		2	–	6	–	0
Massachusetts State		–		2	–	6	–	0
Providence		–		1	–	7	–	0
Syracuse		–		1	–	7	–	0
Vermont		–		1	–	8	–	0
Rankings from AP Poll

The 1936 Saint Vincent Bearcats football team represented Saint Vincent College as an independent during the 1936 college football season. Led by fifth-year head coach Red Edwards, the Bearcats compiled a 5–3 record.

In a wire service column, an Associated Press sportswriter awarded the Bearcats the "undisputed title" of national champions by way of a string of transitive property victories. Saint Vincent beat West Virginia Wesleyan, who beat Duquesne, who beat Pittsburgh, who beat Notre Dame, who beat No. 1 Northwestern, who beat No. 1 Minnesota, who beat Washington, who won the western invitation to the 1937 Rose Bowl by beating Washington State.

== Schedule ==
Date	Time	Opponent	Site	Result	Attendance	Source
September 25		Morris Harvey	Bearcat Stadium; Latrobe, PA	W 26–0		
October 2		Waynesburg	Bearcat Stadium; Latrobe, PA	L 0–6	5,000	
October 9		West Virginia Wesleyan	Bearcat Stadium; Latrobe, PA	W 6–0		
October 18		at Canisius*	Buffalo, NY	L 0–19		
October 30	8:00 p.m.	Davis & Elkins	Bearcat Stadium; Latrobe, PA	W 27–0		
November 15		St. Thomas (PA)	Bearcat Stadium; Latrobe, PA	L 13–6	5,000	
November 8		at St. Bonaventure	Municipal Stadium; Olean, NY	W 14–0		
November 20		Salem	Bearcat Stadium; Latrobe, PA	W 21–6		
*Non-conference game; All times are in Eastern time
