= 1936 Northeastern Huskies football team =

American college football season

1936 Northeastern Huskies football
- Conference: Independent
- Record: 5–4
- Head coach: Alfred McCoy (4th season)
- Captain: Jacob Hart
- Home stadium: Kent Street Field

1936 Eastern college football independents records
	Conf.			Overall
Team	W	L	T	W		L		T
Middlebury		–		8	–	0	–	0
Saint Anselm		–		6	–	0	–	1
No. 3 Pittsburgh		–		8	–	1	–	1
No. 10 Penn		–		7	–	1	–	0
No. 12 Yale		–		7	–	1	–	0
No. 13 Dartmouth		–		7	–	1	–	1
Franklin & Marshall		–		7	–	1	–	1
No. 14 Duquesne		–		8	–	2	–	0
Boston College		–		6	–	1	–	2
Boston University		–		5	–	1	–	2
No. 15 Fordham		–		5	–	1	–	2
Holy Cross		–		7	–	2	–	1
Villanova		–		7	–	2	–	1
Army		–		6	–	3	–	0
Colgate		–		6	–	3	–	0
Drexel		–		6	–	3	–	0
Temple		–		6	–	3	–	2
La Salle		–		6	–	3	–	1
Buffalo		–		5	–	3	–	0
Columbia		–		5	–	3	–	0
Princeton		–		4	–	2	–	2
Saint Vincent		–		5	–	3	–	0
NYU		–		5	–	3	–	1
Manhattan		–		6	–	4	–	0
Northeastern		–		5	–	4	–	0
Bucknell		–		4	–	4	–	1
CCNY		–		4	–	4	–	0
Tufts		–		3	–	3	–	1
Harvard		–		3	–	4	–	1
Cornell		–		3	–	5	–	0
Penn State		–		3	–	5	–	0
Westminster (PA)		–		2	–	4	–	1
Brown		–		3	–	7	–	0
Carnegie Tech		–		2	–	6	–	0
Massachusetts State		–		2	–	6	–	0
Providence		–		1	–	7	–	0
Syracuse		–		1	–	7	–	0
Vermont		–		1	–	8	–	0
Rankings from AP Poll

The 1936 Northeastern Huskies football team represented Northeastern University during the 1936 college football season. It was the program's fourth season and they finished with a record of 5–4. Their head coach was Alfred McCoy serving in his fourth and final season, and their captain was Jacob Hart.

== Schedule ==
Date	Opponent	Site	Result	Attendance
September 26	American International	Kent Street Field; Brookline, MA	W 22–0	
October 3	at Boston College	Alumni Field; Chestnut Hill, MA	L 6–26	7,500
October 10	at Springfield	Springfield, MA	L 7–9	
October 17	St. Lawrence	Kent Street Field; Brookline, MA	W 13–7	
October 23	Rhode Island	Kent Street Field; Brookline, MA	W 15–12	
October 31	Arnold	Kent Street Field; Brookline, MA	W 12–6	
November 7	at Saint Anselm	Goffstown, NH	L 0–19	
November 14	Connecticut State	Kent Street Field; Brookline, MA	L 13–14	
November 21	Lowell Textile	Kent Street Field; Brookline, MA	W 45–0	
