= 1936 Vermont Catamounts football team =

American college football season

1936 Vermont Catamounts football
- Conference: Independent
- Record: 1–8
- Head coach: John P. Sabo (3rd season)
- Home stadium: Centennial Field

1936 Eastern college football independents records
| | Conf. | | | Overall |
| Team | W | L | T | W | | L | | T |
|---|---|---|---|---|---|---|---|---|
| Middlebury | | – | | 8 | – | 0 | – | 0 |
| Saint Anselm | | – | | 6 | – | 0 | – | 1 |
| No. 3 Pittsburgh | | – | | 8 | – | 1 | – | 1 |
| No. 10 Penn | | – | | 7 | – | 1 | – | 0 |
| No. 12 Yale | | – | | 7 | – | 1 | – | 0 |
| No. 13 Dartmouth | | – | | 7 | – | 1 | – | 1 |
| Franklin & Marshall | | – | | 7 | – | 1 | – | 1 |
| No. 14 Duquesne | | – | | 8 | – | 2 | – | 0 |
| Boston College | | – | | 6 | – | 1 | – | 2 |
| Boston University | | – | | 5 | – | 1 | – | 2 |
| No. 15 Fordham | | – | | 5 | – | 1 | – | 2 |
| Holy Cross | | – | | 7 | – | 2 | – | 1 |
| Villanova | | – | | 7 | – | 2 | – | 1 |
| Army | | – | | 6 | – | 3 | – | 0 |
| Colgate | | – | | 6 | – | 3 | – | 0 |
| Drexel | | – | | 6 | – | 3 | – | 0 |
| Temple | | – | | 6 | – | 3 | – | 2 |
| La Salle | | – | | 6 | – | 3 | – | 1 |
| Buffalo | | – | | 5 | – | 3 | – | 0 |
| Columbia | | – | | 5 | – | 3 | – | 0 |
| Princeton | | – | | 4 | – | 2 | – | 2 |
| Saint Vincent | | – | | 5 | – | 3 | – | 0 |
| NYU | | – | | 5 | – | 3 | – | 1 |
| Manhattan | | – | | 6 | – | 4 | – | 0 |
| Northeastern | | – | | 5 | – | 4 | – | 0 |
| Bucknell | | – | | 4 | – | 4 | – | 1 |
| CCNY | | – | | 4 | – | 4 | – | 0 |
| Tufts | | – | | 3 | – | 3 | – | 1 |
| Harvard | | – | | 3 | – | 4 | – | 1 |
| Cornell | | – | | 3 | – | 5 | – | 0 |
| Penn State | | – | | 3 | – | 5 | – | 0 |
| Westminster (PA) | | – | | 2 | – | 4 | – | 1 |
| Brown | | – | | 3 | – | 7 | – | 0 |
| Carnegie Tech | | – | | 2 | – | 6 | – | 0 |
| Massachusetts State | | – | | 2 | – | 6 | – | 0 |
| Providence | | – | | 1 | – | 7 | – | 0 |
| Syracuse | | – | | 1 | – | 7 | – | 0 |
| Vermont | | – | | 1 | – | 8 | – | 0 |
Rankings from AP Poll

The 1936 Vermont Catamounts football team was an American football team that represented the University of Vermont as an independent during the 1936 college football season. In their third year under head coach John P. Sabo, the team compiled a 1–8 record.

== Schedule ==
| Date | Opponent | Site | Result | Attendance | Source |
|---|---|---|---|---|---|
| September 26 | at Williams | Weston Field; Williamstown, MA | L 0–20 | | |
| October 3 | at Dartmouth | Memorial Field; Hanover, NH | L 0–56 | 6,000 | |
| October 10 | at Colby | Seaverns Field; Waterville, ME | L 0–13 | | |
| October 17 | at Union (NY) | Alexander Field; Schenectady, NY | L 0–8 | | |
| October 24 | New Hampshire | Centennial Field; Burlington, VT | L 0–54 | 2,000 | |
| October 31 | Norwich | Centennial Field; Burlington, VT | W 13–6 | | |
| November 7 | Amherst | Centennial Field; Burlington, VT | L 0–48 | | |
| November 14 | at Middlebury | Porter Field; Middlebury, VT | L 0–20 | | |
| November 21 | at Trinity (CT) | Trinity Field; Hartford, CT | L 0–33 | | |
