= 1936 Columbia Lions football team =

American college football season

1936 Columbia Lions football
- Conference: Independent
- Record: 5–3
- Head coach: Lou Little (7th season)
- Captains: Joseph Coviello; George Furey
- Home stadium: Baker Field, Polo Grounds

1936 Eastern college football independents records
	Conf.			Overall
Team	W	L	T	W		L		T
Middlebury		–		8	–	0	–	0
Saint Anselm		–		6	–	0	–	1
No. 3 Pittsburgh		–		8	–	1	–	1
No. 10 Penn		–		7	–	1	–	0
No. 12 Yale		–		7	–	1	–	0
No. 13 Dartmouth		–		7	–	1	–	1
Franklin & Marshall		–		7	–	1	–	1
No. 14 Duquesne		–		8	–	2	–	0
Boston College		–		6	–	1	–	2
Boston University		–		5	–	1	–	2
No. 15 Fordham		–		5	–	1	–	2
Holy Cross		–		7	–	2	–	1
Villanova		–		7	–	2	–	1
Army		–		6	–	3	–	0
Colgate		–		6	–	3	–	0
Drexel		–		6	–	3	–	0
Temple		–		6	–	3	–	2
La Salle		–		6	–	3	–	1
Buffalo		–		5	–	3	–	0
Columbia		–		5	–	3	–	0
Princeton		–		4	–	2	–	2
Saint Vincent		–		5	–	3	–	0
NYU		–		5	–	3	–	1
Manhattan		–		6	–	4	–	0
Northeastern		–		5	–	4	–	0
Bucknell		–		4	–	4	–	1
CCNY		–		4	–	4	–	0
Tufts		–		3	–	3	–	1
Harvard		–		3	–	4	–	1
Cornell		–		3	–	5	–	0
Penn State		–		3	–	5	–	0
Westminster (PA)		–		2	–	4	–	1
Brown		–		3	–	7	–	0
Carnegie Tech		–		2	–	6	–	0
Massachusetts State		–		2	–	6	–	0
Providence		–		1	–	7	–	0
Syracuse		–		1	–	7	–	0
Vermont		–		1	–	8	–	0
Rankings from AP Poll

The 1936 Columbia Lions football team was an American football team that represented Columbia University as an independent during the 1936 college football season. In his seventh season, head coach Lou Little led the team to a 5–3 record, and the Lions outscored opponents 145 to 73.

The team played most of its home games at Baker Field in Upper Manhattan.

== Schedule ==
Date	Opponent	Site	Result	Attendance	Source
October 3	Maine	Baker Field; New York, NY	W 34–0	7,000	
October 10	vs. Army	Yankee Stadium; Bronx, NY	L 16–27	38,000	
October 17	VMI	Baker Field; New York, NY	W 38–0	5,000	
October 24	at Michigan	Michigan Stadium; Ann Arbor, MI	L 0–13	25,000	
October 31	Cornell	Baker Field; New York, NY (rivalry)	W 20–13	28,000	
November 7	at No. 18 Dartmouth	Memorial Field; Hanover, NH	L 13–20	10,000	
November 14	Syracuse	Baker Field; New York, NY	W 17–0	20,000	
November 28	Stanford	Polo Grounds; New York, NY	W 7–0	28,000	
Rankings from AP Poll released prior to the game
