= 1936 Westminster Titans football team =

American college football season

1936 Westminster Titans football
- Conference: Independent
- Record: 2–4–1
- Head coach: George Roark (1st season)

1936 Eastern college football independents records
	Conf.			Overall
Team	W	L	T	W		L		T
Middlebury		–		8	–	0	–	0
Saint Anselm		–		6	–	0	–	1
No. 3 Pittsburgh		–		8	–	1	–	1
No. 10 Penn		–		7	–	1	–	0
No. 12 Yale		–		7	–	1	–	0
No. 13 Dartmouth		–		7	–	1	–	1
Franklin & Marshall		–		7	–	1	–	1
No. 14 Duquesne		–		8	–	2	–	0
Boston College		–		6	–	1	–	2
Boston University		–		5	–	1	–	2
No. 15 Fordham		–		5	–	1	–	2
Holy Cross		–		7	–	2	–	1
Villanova		–		7	–	2	–	1
Army		–		6	–	3	–	0
Colgate		–		6	–	3	–	0
Drexel		–		6	–	3	–	0
Temple		–		6	–	3	–	2
La Salle		–		6	–	3	–	1
Buffalo		–		5	–	3	–	0
Columbia		–		5	–	3	–	0
Princeton		–		4	–	2	–	2
Saint Vincent		–		5	–	3	–	0
NYU		–		5	–	3	–	1
Manhattan		–		6	–	4	–	0
Northeastern		–		5	–	4	–	0
Bucknell		–		4	–	4	–	1
CCNY		–		4	–	4	–	0
Tufts		–		3	–	3	–	1
Harvard		–		3	–	4	–	1
Cornell		–		3	–	5	–	0
Penn State		–		3	–	5	–	0
Westminster (PA)		–		2	–	4	–	1
Brown		–		3	–	7	–	0
Carnegie Tech		–		2	–	6	–	0
Massachusetts State		–		2	–	6	–	0
Providence		–		1	–	7	–	0
Syracuse		–		1	–	7	–	0
Vermont		–		1	–	8	–	0
Rankings from AP Poll

The 1936 Westminster Titans football team represented Westminster College as an independent during the 1936 college football season. In George Roark's first and only season as head coach, the Titans compiled a 2–4–1 record, scoring 59 points while allowing 131.

== Schedule ==
Date	Opponent	Site	Result	Source
October 3	Mount Union	New Wilmington, PA	L 0–27	
October 10	Bethany (WV)^{†}	New Wilmington, PA	L 6–13	
October 17	Slippery Rock	New Wilmington, PA	L 0–14	
October 24	at Geneva	Beaver Falls, PA	L 0–51	
October 31	Thiel	New Wilmington, PA	W 13–6	
November 7	at Edinboro	Edinboro, PA	W 33–13	
November 14	at Allegheny	Meadville, PA	T 7–7	
^{†}Homecoming
