= 1936 Massachusetts State Aggies football team =

American college football season

1936 Massachusetts State Aggies football
- Conference: Independent
- Record: 2–6
- Head coach: Elbert Carraway (1st season)
- Home stadium: Alumni Field

1936 Eastern college football independents records
	Conf.			Overall
Team	W	L	T	W		L		T
Middlebury		–		8	–	0	–	0
Saint Anselm		–		6	–	0	–	1
No. 3 Pittsburgh		–		8	–	1	–	1
No. 10 Penn		–		7	–	1	–	0
No. 12 Yale		–		7	–	1	–	0
No. 13 Dartmouth		–		7	–	1	–	1
Franklin & Marshall		–		7	–	1	–	1
No. 14 Duquesne		–		8	–	2	–	0
Boston College		–		6	–	1	–	2
Boston University		–		5	–	1	–	2
No. 15 Fordham		–		5	–	1	–	2
Holy Cross		–		7	–	2	–	1
Villanova		–		7	–	2	–	1
Army		–		6	–	3	–	0
Colgate		–		6	–	3	–	0
Drexel		–		6	–	3	–	0
Temple		–		6	–	3	–	2
La Salle		–		6	–	3	–	1
Buffalo		–		5	–	3	–	0
Columbia		–		5	–	3	–	0
Princeton		–		4	–	2	–	2
Saint Vincent		–		5	–	3	–	0
NYU		–		5	–	3	–	1
Manhattan		–		6	–	4	–	0
Northeastern		–		5	–	4	–	0
Bucknell		–		4	–	4	–	1
CCNY		–		4	–	4	–	0
Tufts		–		3	–	3	–	1
Harvard		–		3	–	4	–	1
Cornell		–		3	–	5	–	0
Penn State		–		3	–	5	–	0
Westminster (PA)		–		2	–	4	–	1
Brown		–		3	–	7	–	0
Carnegie Tech		–		2	–	6	–	0
Massachusetts State		–		2	–	6	–	0
Providence		–		1	–	7	–	0
Syracuse		–		1	–	7	–	0
Vermont		–		1	–	8	–	0
Rankings from AP Poll

The 1936 Massachusetts State Aggies football team represented Massachusetts State College in the 1936 college football season. The team played its home games at Alumni Field in Amherst, Massachusetts. Mass State finished the season with a record of 2–6. Elbert Carraway was the team's head coach, in the first of his five years leading the team.

== Schedule ==
Note: All scores/opponents sourced from Carlson 1998.

Date	Opponent	Site	Result
October 3	at Bowdoin	Whittier Field; Brunswick, ME	L 12–14
October 10	at Connecticut	Gardner Dow Athletic Fields; Storrs, CT (rivalry)	L 0–13
October 17	vs. Rhode Island	Cranston Stadium; Cranston, RI	W 13–8
October 24	Worcester Poly	Alumni Field; Amherst, MA	L 0–7
October 31	Amherst	Alumni Field; Amherst, MA	L 7–13
November 7	at Coast Guard	Cadet Memorial Field; New London, CT	L 20–26
November 14	at RPI	'86 Field; Troy, NY	W 40–0
November 21	at Tufts	Tufts Oval; Somerville, MA	L 0–13
