= 1936 Carnegie Tech Tartans football team =

American college football season

1936 Carnegie Tech Tartans football
- Conference: Independent
- Record: 2–6
- Head coach: Howard Harpster (4th season)
- Home stadium: Pitt Stadium

1936 Eastern college football independents records
	Conf.			Overall
Team	W	L	T	W		L		T
Middlebury		–		8	–	0	–	0
Saint Anselm		–		6	–	0	–	1
No. 3 Pittsburgh		–		8	–	1	–	1
No. 10 Penn		–		7	–	1	–	0
No. 12 Yale		–		7	–	1	–	0
No. 13 Dartmouth		–		7	–	1	–	1
Franklin & Marshall		–		7	–	1	–	1
No. 14 Duquesne		–		8	–	2	–	0
Boston College		–		6	–	1	–	2
Boston University		–		5	–	1	–	2
No. 15 Fordham		–		5	–	1	–	2
Holy Cross		–		7	–	2	–	1
Villanova		–		7	–	2	–	1
Army		–		6	–	3	–	0
Colgate		–		6	–	3	–	0
Drexel		–		6	–	3	–	0
Temple		–		6	–	3	–	2
La Salle		–		6	–	3	–	1
Buffalo		–		5	–	3	–	0
Columbia		–		5	–	3	–	0
Princeton		–		4	–	2	–	2
Saint Vincent		–		5	–	3	–	0
NYU		–		5	–	3	–	1
Manhattan		–		6	–	4	–	0
Northeastern		–		5	–	4	–	0
Bucknell		–		4	–	4	–	1
CCNY		–		4	–	4	–	0
Tufts		–		3	–	3	–	1
Harvard		–		3	–	4	–	1
Cornell		–		3	–	5	–	0
Penn State		–		3	–	5	–	0
Westminster (PA)		–		2	–	4	–	1
Brown		–		3	–	7	–	0
Carnegie Tech		–		2	–	6	–	0
Massachusetts State		–		2	–	6	–	0
Providence		–		1	–	7	–	0
Syracuse		–		1	–	7	–	0
Vermont		–		1	–	8	–	0
Rankings from AP Poll

The 1936 Carnegie Tech Tartans football team represented the Carnegie Institute of Technology—now known as Carnegie Mellon University—as an independent during the 1936 college football season. Led by Howard Harpster in his fourth and final season as head coach, the Tartans compiled a record of 2–6. Carnegie Tech played home games at Pitt Stadium in Pittsburgh.

== Schedule ==
Date	Opponent	Site	Result	Attendance	Source
October 3	at Notre Dame	Notre Dame Stadium; Notre Dame, IN	L 7–21	15,673–35,000	
October 10	Michigan State	Pittsburgh, PA	L 0–7	15,000	
October 16	at Temple	Temple Stadium; Philadelphia, PA	W 7–0	20,000	
October 24	at No. 17 Holy Cross	Fitton Field; Worcester, MA	L 0–7		
October 31	No. 17 Purdue	Pitt Stadium; Pittsburgh, PA	L 6–7	20,000	
November 7	at NYU	Yankee Stadium; Bronx, NY	W 14–6	10,000	
November 14	Duquesne	Pitt Stadium; Pittsburgh, PA	L 0–13		
November 26	No. 4 Pittsburgh	Pitt Stadium; Pittsburgh, PA	L 14–31	40,000	
Rankings from AP Poll released prior to the game
