= 1936 Harvard Crimson football team =

American college football season

1936 Harvard Crimson football
- Conference: Independent
- Record: 3–4–1
- Head coach: Dick Harlow (2nd season)
- Home stadium: Harvard Stadium

1936 Eastern college football independents records
	Conf.			Overall
Team	W	L	T	W		L		T
Middlebury		–		8	–	0	–	0
Saint Anselm		–		6	–	0	–	1
No. 3 Pittsburgh		–		8	–	1	–	1
No. 10 Penn		–		7	–	1	–	0
No. 12 Yale		–		7	–	1	–	0
No. 13 Dartmouth		–		7	–	1	–	1
Franklin & Marshall		–		7	–	1	–	1
No. 14 Duquesne		–		8	–	2	–	0
Boston College		–		6	–	1	–	2
Boston University		–		5	–	1	–	2
No. 15 Fordham		–		5	–	1	–	2
Holy Cross		–		7	–	2	–	1
Villanova		–		7	–	2	–	1
Army		–		6	–	3	–	0
Colgate		–		6	–	3	–	0
Drexel		–		6	–	3	–	0
Temple		–		6	–	3	–	2
La Salle		–		6	–	3	–	1
Buffalo		–		5	–	3	–	0
Columbia		–		5	–	3	–	0
Princeton		–		4	–	2	–	2
Saint Vincent		–		5	–	3	–	0
NYU		–		5	–	3	–	1
Manhattan		–		6	–	4	–	0
Northeastern		–		5	–	4	–	0
Bucknell		–		4	–	4	–	1
CCNY		–		4	–	4	–	0
Tufts		–		3	–	3	–	1
Harvard		–		3	–	4	–	1
Cornell		–		3	–	5	–	0
Penn State		–		3	–	5	–	0
Westminster (PA)		–		2	–	4	–	1
Brown		–		3	–	7	–	0
Carnegie Tech		–		2	–	6	–	0
Massachusetts State		–		2	–	6	–	0
Providence		–		1	–	7	–	0
Syracuse		–		1	–	7	–	0
Vermont		–		1	–	8	–	0
Rankings from AP Poll

The 1936 Harvard Crimson football team was an American football team that represented Harvard University as an independent during the 1936 college football season. In its second season under head coach Dick Harlow, the team compiled a 3–4–1 record and outscored opponents by a total of 178 to 112. The team played its home games at Harvard Stadium in Cambridge, Massachusetts.

== Schedule ==
Date	Opponent	Site	Result	Attendance	Source
October 3	Amherst	Harvard Stadium; Boston, MA	W 38–6	15,000	
October 10	Brown	Harvard Stadium; Boston, MA	W 28–0	8,000	
October 17	Army	Harvard Stadium; Boston, MA	L 0–32	20,000	
October 24	Dartmouth	Harvard Stadium; Boston, MA (rivalry)	L 7–26	> 35,000	
October 31	No. 17 Princeton	Harvard Stadium; Boston, MA (rivalry)	T 14–14	25,000	
November 7	Virginia	Harvard Stadium; Boston, MA	W 65–0	10,000	
November 14	Navy	Harvard Stadium; Boston, MA	L 13–20	42,000	
November 21	at Yale	Yale Bowl; New Haven, CT (rivalry)	L 13–14	58,000	
Rankings from AP Poll released prior to the game
