= 1936 Yale Bulldogs football team =

American college football season

1936 Yale Bulldogs football
- Conference: Independent

Ranking
- AP: No. 12
- Record: 7–1
- Head coach: Ducky Pond (3rd season)
- Captain: Larry Kelley
- Home stadium: Yale Bowl

1936 Eastern college football independents records
	Conf.			Overall
Team	W	L	T	W		L		T
Middlebury		–		8	–	0	–	0
Saint Anselm		–		6	–	0	–	1
No. 3 Pittsburgh		–		8	–	1	–	1
No. 10 Penn		–		7	–	1	–	0
No. 12 Yale		–		7	–	1	–	0
No. 13 Dartmouth		–		7	–	1	–	1
Franklin & Marshall		–		7	–	1	–	1
No. 14 Duquesne		–		8	–	2	–	0
Boston College		–		6	–	1	–	2
Boston University		–		5	–	1	–	2
No. 15 Fordham		–		5	–	1	–	2
Holy Cross		–		7	–	2	–	1
Villanova		–		7	–	2	–	1
Army		–		6	–	3	–	0
Colgate		–		6	–	3	–	0
Drexel		–		6	–	3	–	0
Temple		–		6	–	3	–	2
La Salle		–		6	–	3	–	1
Buffalo		–		5	–	3	–	0
Columbia		–		5	–	3	–	0
Princeton		–		4	–	2	–	2
Saint Vincent		–		5	–	3	–	0
NYU		–		5	–	3	–	1
Manhattan		–		6	–	4	–	0
Northeastern		–		5	–	4	–	0
Bucknell		–		4	–	4	–	1
CCNY		–		4	–	4	–	0
Tufts		–		3	–	3	–	1
Harvard		–		3	–	4	–	1
Cornell		–		3	–	5	–	0
Penn State		–		3	–	5	–	0
Westminster (PA)		–		2	–	4	–	1
Brown		–		3	–	7	–	0
Carnegie Tech		–		2	–	6	–	0
Massachusetts State		–		2	–	6	–	0
Providence		–		1	–	7	–	0
Syracuse		–		1	–	7	–	0
Vermont		–		1	–	8	–	0
Rankings from AP Poll

The 1936 Yale Bulldogs football team represented Yale University in the 1936 college football season. The Bulldogs were led by third-year head coach Ducky Pond, played their home games at the Yale Bowl and finished the season with a 7–1 record. Yale's captain Larry Kelley would be awarded the Heisman Trophy as the best player in college football following the season.

== Schedule ==
Date	Opponent	Rank	Site	Result	Attendance	Source
October 3	Cornell		Yale Bowl; New Haven, CT	W 23–0		
October 10	Penn		Yale Bowl; New Haven, CT	W 7–0		
October 17	at Navy		Municipal Stadium; Baltimore, MD	W 12–7		
October 24	Rutgers	No. 10	Yale Bowl; New Haven, CT	W 28–0		
November 1	Dartmouth	No. 12	Yale Bowl; New Haven, CT	L 7–11		
November 7	Brown		Yale Bowl; New Haven, CT	W 14–6		
November 14	at Princeton		Palmer Stadium; Princeton, NJ (rivalry)	W 26–23	57,000	
November 21	Harvard		Yale Bowl; New Haven, CT (rivalry)	W 14–13	58,000	
Rankings from AP Poll released prior to the game

== NFL draft ==
The following Bulldog was selected in the National Football League draft following the season.

Round	Pick	Player	Position	NFL team
9	87	Larry Kelley	E	Detroit Lions
