= 1936 Temple Owls football team =

American college football season

1936 Temple Owls football
- Conference: Independent
- Record: 6–3–2
- Head coach: Pop Warner (4th season)
- Captain: Bill Docherty
- Home stadium: Temple Stadium

1936 Eastern college football independents records
	Conf.			Overall
Team	W	L	T	W		L		T
Middlebury		–		8	–	0	–	0
Saint Anselm		–		6	–	0	–	1
No. 3 Pittsburgh		–		8	–	1	–	1
No. 10 Penn		–		7	–	1	–	0
No. 12 Yale		–		7	–	1	–	0
No. 13 Dartmouth		–		7	–	1	–	1
Franklin & Marshall		–		7	–	1	–	1
No. 14 Duquesne		–		8	–	2	–	0
Boston College		–		6	–	1	–	2
Boston University		–		5	–	1	–	2
No. 15 Fordham		–		5	–	1	–	2
Holy Cross		–		7	–	2	–	1
Villanova		–		7	–	2	–	1
Army		–		6	–	3	–	0
Colgate		–		6	–	3	–	0
Drexel		–		6	–	3	–	0
Temple		–		6	–	3	–	2
La Salle		–		6	–	3	–	1
Buffalo		–		5	–	3	–	0
Columbia		–		5	–	3	–	0
Princeton		–		4	–	2	–	2
Saint Vincent		–		5	–	3	–	0
NYU		–		5	–	3	–	1
Manhattan		–		6	–	4	–	0
Northeastern		–		5	–	4	–	0
Bucknell		–		4	–	4	–	1
CCNY		–		4	–	4	–	0
Tufts		–		3	–	3	–	1
Harvard		–		3	–	4	–	1
Cornell		–		3	–	5	–	0
Penn State		–		3	–	5	–	0
Westminster (PA)		–		2	–	4	–	1
Brown		–		3	–	7	–	0
Carnegie Tech		–		2	–	6	–	0
Massachusetts State		–		2	–	6	–	0
Providence		–		1	–	7	–	0
Syracuse		–		1	–	7	–	0
Vermont		–		1	–	8	–	0
Rankings from AP Poll

The 1936 Temple Owls football team was an American football team that represented Temple University as an independent during the 1936 college football season. In its fourth season under head coach Pop Warner, the team compiled a 6–3–2 record and outscored opponents by a total of 117 to 66. The team played its home games at Temple Stadium in Philadelphia.

== Schedule ==
Date	Time	Opponent	Rank	Site	Result	Attendance	Source
September 18		Saint Joseph's		Temple Stadium; Philadelphia, PA	W 18–0		
September 25	8:45 p.m.	Centre		Temple Stadium; Philadelphia, PA	W 50–7	15,000	
October 2		Ole Miss		Temple Stadium; Philadelphia, PA	W 12–7		
October 12	2:30 p.m.	at Boston College		Fenway Park; Boston, MA	W 14–0	24,000	
October 16	8:45 p.m.	Carnegie Tech		Temple Stadium; Philadelphia, PA	L 0–7	20,000	
October 31		No. 13 Holy Cross		Temple Stadium; Philadelphia, PA	W 3–0		
November 7		at Michigan State		Macklin Field; East Lansing, MI	T 7–7	20,000	
November 14		Villanova	No. 19	Temple Stadium; Philadelphia, PA	W 6–0		
November 21		Iowa	No. 20	Temple Stadium; Philadelphia, PA	L 0–25		
November 26		Bucknell		Temple Stadium; Philadelphia, PA	T 0–0	12,000	
December 5		at Saint Mary's		Kezar Stadium; San Francisco, CA	L 7–13	< 15,000	
Rankings from AP Poll released prior to the game; All times are in Eastern time
