= 1936 Bucknell Bison football team =

American college football season

1936 Bucknell Bison football
- Conference: Independent
- Record: 4–4–1
- Head coach: Edward Mylin (3rd season)
- Home stadium: Memorial Stadium

1936 Eastern college football independents records
	Conf.			Overall
Team	W	L	T	W		L		T
Middlebury		–		8	–	0	–	0
Saint Anselm		–		6	–	0	–	1
No. 3 Pittsburgh		–		8	–	1	–	1
No. 10 Penn		–		7	–	1	–	0
No. 12 Yale		–		7	–	1	–	0
No. 13 Dartmouth		–		7	–	1	–	1
Franklin & Marshall		–		7	–	1	–	1
No. 14 Duquesne		–		8	–	2	–	0
Boston College		–		6	–	1	–	2
Boston University		–		5	–	1	–	2
No. 15 Fordham		–		5	–	1	–	2
Holy Cross		–		7	–	2	–	1
Villanova		–		7	–	2	–	1
Army		–		6	–	3	–	0
Colgate		–		6	–	3	–	0
Drexel		–		6	–	3	–	0
Temple		–		6	–	3	–	2
La Salle		–		6	–	3	–	1
Buffalo		–		5	–	3	–	0
Columbia		–		5	–	3	–	0
Princeton		–		4	–	2	–	2
Saint Vincent		–		5	–	3	–	0
NYU		–		5	–	3	–	1
Manhattan		–		6	–	4	–	0
Northeastern		–		5	–	4	–	0
Bucknell		–		4	–	4	–	1
CCNY		–		4	–	4	–	0
Tufts		–		3	–	3	–	1
Harvard		–		3	–	4	–	1
Cornell		–		3	–	5	–	0
Penn State		–		3	–	5	–	0
Westminster (PA)		–		2	–	4	–	1
Brown		–		3	–	7	–	0
Carnegie Tech		–		2	–	6	–	0
Massachusetts State		–		2	–	6	–	0
Providence		–		1	–	7	–	0
Syracuse		–		1	–	7	–	0
Vermont		–		1	–	8	–	0
Rankings from AP Poll

The 1936 Bucknell Bison football team was an American football team that represented Bucknell University as an independent during the 1936 college football season. In its third season under head coach Edward Mylin, the team compiled a 4–4–1 record.

The team played its home games at Memorial Stadium in Lewisburg, Pennsylvania.

== Schedule ==
Date	Opponent	Site	Result	Attendance	Source
September 25	Ursinus	Memorial Stadium; Lewisburg, PA	W 6–0		
October 2	Lebanon Valley	Memorial Stadium; Lewisburg, PA	W 20–0		
October 9	Miami (FL)	Memorial Stadium; Lewisburg, PA	L 0–6		
October 17	at Georgetown	Griffith Stadium; Washington, DC	L 0–19	9,000	
October 24	at Washington & Jefferson	Washington, PA	W 26–6	4,000	
October 31	Villanova^{†}	Memorial Stadium; Lewisburg, PA	W 6–0	12,000	
November 7	at Detroit	University of Detroit Stadium; Detroit, MI	L 7–33	12,000	
November 21	at Penn State	New Beaver Field; State College, PA	L 0–14	12,000	
November 26	at Temple	Temple Stadium; Philadelphia, PA	T 0–0	12,000	
^{†}Homecoming
