= 1936 NYU Violets football team =

American college football season

1936 NYU Violets football
- Conference: Independent
- Record: 5–3–1
- Head coach: Mal Stevens (3rd season)
- Home stadium: Ohio Field; Yankee Stadium

1936 Eastern college football independents records
	Conf.			Overall
Team	W	L	T	W		L		T
Middlebury		–		8	–	0	–	0
Saint Anselm		–		6	–	0	–	1
No. 3 Pittsburgh		–		8	–	1	–	1
No. 10 Penn		–		7	–	1	–	0
No. 12 Yale		–		7	–	1	–	0
No. 13 Dartmouth		–		7	–	1	–	1
Franklin & Marshall		–		7	–	1	–	1
No. 14 Duquesne		–		8	–	2	–	0
Boston College		–		6	–	1	–	2
Boston University		–		5	–	1	–	2
No. 15 Fordham		–		5	–	1	–	2
Holy Cross		–		7	–	2	–	1
Villanova		–		7	–	2	–	1
Army		–		6	–	3	–	0
Colgate		–		6	–	3	–	0
Drexel		–		6	–	3	–	0
Temple		–		6	–	3	–	2
La Salle		–		6	–	3	–	1
Buffalo		–		5	–	3	–	0
Columbia		–		5	–	3	–	0
Princeton		–		4	–	2	–	2
Saint Vincent		–		5	–	3	–	0
NYU		–		5	–	3	–	1
Manhattan		–		6	–	4	–	0
Northeastern		–		5	–	4	–	0
Bucknell		–		4	–	4	–	1
CCNY		–		4	–	4	–	0
Tufts		–		3	–	3	–	1
Harvard		–		3	–	4	–	1
Cornell		–		3	–	5	–	0
Penn State		–		3	–	5	–	0
Westminster (PA)		–		2	–	4	–	1
Brown		–		3	–	7	–	0
Carnegie Tech		–		2	–	6	–	0
Massachusetts State		–		2	–	6	–	0
Providence		–		1	–	7	–	0
Syracuse		–		1	–	7	–	0
Vermont		–		1	–	8	–	0
Rankings from AP Poll

The 1936 NYU Violets football team was an American football team that represented New York University as an independent during the 1936 college football season. In their third year under head coach Mal Stevens, the team compiled a 5–3–1 record.

== Schedule ==
Date	Opponent	Site	Result	Attendance	Source
October 3	at Ohio State	Ohio Stadium; Columbus, OH	L 0–60	72,948	
October 10	Pennsylvania Military	Ohio Field; Bronx, NY	W 26–0		
October 17	North Carolina	Yankee Stadium; Bronx, NY	L 13–14	10,000	
October 24	Georgetown	Yankee Stadium; Bronx, NY	T 7–7	16,000	
October 31	Lafayette	Yankee Stadium; Bronx, NY	W 46–0	8,000	
November 7	Carnegie Tech	Yankee Stadium; Bronx, NY	L 6–14	10,000	
November 14	Rutgers	Polo Grounds; New York, NY	W 46–0	6,000	
November 21	CCNY	Yankee Stadium; Bronx, NY	W 25–7	5,000	
November 26	Fordham	Yankee Stadium; Bronx, NY	W 7–6	50,000	
