= 1936 Princeton Tigers football team =

American college football season

1936 Princeton Tigers football
- Conference: Independent
- Record: 4–2–2
- Head coach: Fritz Crisler (5th season)
- Captain: Bill Montgomery
- Home stadium: Palmer Stadium

1936 Eastern college football independents records
	Conf.			Overall
Team	W	L	T	W		L		T
Middlebury		–		8	–	0	–	0
Saint Anselm		–		6	–	0	–	1
No. 3 Pittsburgh		–		8	–	1	–	1
No. 10 Penn		–		7	–	1	–	0
No. 12 Yale		–		7	–	1	–	0
No. 13 Dartmouth		–		7	–	1	–	1
Franklin & Marshall		–		7	–	1	–	1
No. 14 Duquesne		–		8	–	2	–	0
Boston College		–		6	–	1	–	2
Boston University		–		5	–	1	–	2
No. 15 Fordham		–		5	–	1	–	2
Holy Cross		–		7	–	2	–	1
Villanova		–		7	–	2	–	1
Army		–		6	–	3	–	0
Colgate		–		6	–	3	–	0
Drexel		–		6	–	3	–	0
Temple		–		6	–	3	–	2
La Salle		–		6	–	3	–	1
Buffalo		–		5	–	3	–	0
Columbia		–		5	–	3	–	0
Princeton		–		4	–	2	–	2
Saint Vincent		–		5	–	3	–	0
NYU		–		5	–	3	–	1
Manhattan		–		6	–	4	–	0
Northeastern		–		5	–	4	–	0
Bucknell		–		4	–	4	–	1
CCNY		–		4	–	4	–	0
Tufts		–		3	–	3	–	1
Harvard		–		3	–	4	–	1
Cornell		–		3	–	5	–	0
Penn State		–		3	–	5	–	0
Westminster (PA)		–		2	–	4	–	1
Brown		–		3	–	7	–	0
Carnegie Tech		–		2	–	6	–	0
Massachusetts State		–		2	–	6	–	0
Providence		–		1	–	7	–	0
Syracuse		–		1	–	7	–	0
Vermont		–		1	–	8	–	0
Rankings from AP Poll

The 1936 Princeton Tigers football team was an American football team that represented Princeton University as an independent during the 1936 college football season. In its fifth season under head coach Fritz Crisler, the team compiled a 4–2–2 record and outscored opponents by a total of 145 to 80. The team played its home games at Palmer Stadium in Princeton, New Jersey.

Bill Montgomery was the team captain. Three Princeton players were selected by the Associated Press (AP) to the 1936 All-Eastern college football team: Charles Toll at tackle (AP-1); Ken Sandbach at quarterback (AP-2); and Bill Montgomery at guard (AP-2). Toll was also selected by the AP as a second-team player on the 1936 All-America college football team.

== Schedule ==
Date	Opponent	Rank	Site	Result	Attendance	Source
October 3	Williams		Palmer Stadium; Princeton, NJ	W 27–7	40,000	
October 10	Rutgers		Palmer Stadium; Princeton, NJ (rivalry)	W 20–0	16,000	
October 17	at Penn		Franklin Field; Philadelphia, PA (rivalry)	L 0–7	60,000	
October 24	Navy		Palmer Stadium; Princeton, NJ	W 7–0	45,000	
October 31	at Harvard	No. 17	Harvard Stadium; Boston, MA (rivalry)	T 14–14	25,000	
November 7	Cornell		Palmer Stadium; Princeton, NJ	W 41–13	25,000	
November 14	Yale		Palmer Stadium; Princeton, NJ (rivalry)	L 23–26	57,000	
November 21	No. 12 Dartmouth		Palmer Stadium; Princeton, NJ	T 13–13	45,000	
Rankings from AP Poll released prior to the game
