= 1936 Duquesne Dukes football team =

American college football season

1936 Duquesne Dukes football

Orange Bowl champion

Orange Bowl, W 13–12 vs. Mississippi State
- Conference: Independent

Ranking
- AP: No. 14
- Record: 8–2
- Head coach: Clipper Smith (1st season)
- Home stadium: Forbes Field

1936 Eastern college football independents records
	Conf.			Overall
Team	W	L	T	W		L		T
Middlebury		–		8	–	0	–	0
Saint Anselm		–		6	–	0	–	1
No. 3 Pittsburgh		–		8	–	1	–	1
No. 10 Penn		–		7	–	1	–	0
No. 12 Yale		–		7	–	1	–	0
No. 13 Dartmouth		–		7	–	1	–	1
Franklin & Marshall		–		7	–	1	–	1
No. 14 Duquesne		–		8	–	2	–	0
Boston College		–		6	–	1	–	2
Boston University		–		5	–	1	–	2
No. 15 Fordham		–		5	–	1	–	2
Holy Cross		–		7	–	2	–	1
Villanova		–		7	–	2	–	1
Army		–		6	–	3	–	0
Colgate		–		6	–	3	–	0
Drexel		–		6	–	3	–	0
Temple		–		6	–	3	–	2
La Salle		–		6	–	3	–	1
Buffalo		–		5	–	3	–	0
Columbia		–		5	–	3	–	0
Princeton		–		4	–	2	–	2
Saint Vincent		–		5	–	3	–	0
NYU		–		5	–	3	–	1
Manhattan		–		6	–	4	–	0
Northeastern		–		5	–	4	–	0
Bucknell		–		4	–	4	–	1
CCNY		–		4	–	4	–	0
Tufts		–		3	–	3	–	1
Harvard		–		3	–	4	–	1
Cornell		–		3	–	5	–	0
Penn State		–		3	–	5	–	0
Westminster (PA)		–		2	–	4	–	1
Brown		–		3	–	7	–	0
Carnegie Tech		–		2	–	6	–	0
Massachusetts State		–		2	–	6	–	0
Providence		–		1	–	7	–	0
Syracuse		–		1	–	7	–	0
Vermont		–		1	–	8	–	0
Rankings from AP Poll

The 1936 Duquesne Dukes football team, sometimes known as the Bluffites, was an American football team that represented Duquesne University as an independent during the 1936 college football season. In their first year under head coach Clipper Smith, the Dukes compiled an 8–2 record, shut out seven of ten opponents, and outscored all opponents by a total of 140 to 28. They defeated cross-town rival, Pittsburgh, the only loss of the season for a Pitt team that finished the season ranked No. 3 in the AP poll. After the victory over Pitt, Duquesne rose to No. 11 in the AP poll, but then lost the next two games to West Virginia Wesleyan and Detroit. They concluded the season with four consecutive victories, including a 13–0 victory over No. 7 Marquette and a 13–12 victory over Mississippi State in the 1937 Orange Bowl. They were ranked No. 14 in the final AP poll and No. 10 in the Litkenhous Ratings.

Key players included center Mike Basrak, right halfback Boyd Brumbaugh, guard George Kakasic, and fullback Jim McDonald. Basrak received first-team All-America honors from the Associated Press, International News Service, the All-America Board, and Liberty magazine.

The team played its home games at Forbes Field in Pittsburgh.

== Schedule ==
Date	Opponent	Rank	Site	Result	Attendance	Source
September 25	Waynesburg		Forbes Field; Pittsburgh, PA	W 14–0	10,000	
October 2	Rice		Forbes Field; Pittsburgh, PA	W 14–0	16,000	
October 9	Geneva		Forbes Field; Pittsburgh, PA	W 33–0		
October 17	at Pittsburgh		Pitt Stadium; Pittsburgh, PA	W 7–0	20,000	
October 23	West Virginia Wesleyan	No. 11	Forbes Field; Pittsburgh, PA	L 0–2		
October 30	at Detroit		University of Detroit Stadium; Detroit, MI	L 7–14	15,000	
November 6	at Washington University		Francis Field; St. Louis, MO	W 26–0	14,000	
November 14	at Carnegie Tech		Pitt Stadium; Pittsburgh, PA	W 13–0	35,000	
November 21	No. 7 Marquette	No. 20	Forbes Field; Pittsburgh, PA	W 13–0	27,871	
January 1	vs. Mississippi State	No. 14	Miami Field; Miami, FL (Orange Bowl)	W 13–12	9,210–12,000	
Rankings from AP Poll released prior to the game

== Roster ==
- Chet Airhart, end
- Tex Amann, guard
- Steve Barko, guard
- Mitchell Barron
- Mike Basrak, center
- Ken Bechtloff, fullback
- Boyd Brumbaugh, halfback
- Burns, tackle
- Campbell, fullback
- Jim Casillo, quarterback
- Chapaia, end
- William Critchfield
- William Dillon, halfback
- Disegi, end
- James Faziola
- Ferko, guard
- Fillingham, halfback
- Gates, quarterback
- Robert Goodman, tackle
- Ted Grabinski
- Ernie Hefferle, end
- James Horn, guard
- Johnson, tackle
- George Kakasic, guard
- John Karrs, center
- Larry Kirschling, end
- Joe Laputka, tackle
- Regis Lhoest
- Sam Mangone
- Marshall Manuel
- Joe Maras, tackle
- George Matsik, halfback
- Jim McDonald, fullback
- Vince McKeeta
- John Minnick
- Geno Onder
- John Perko, guard
- George Platukis, end
- Ray Serangelli
- Sullivan Sussano, center
- Alex Tannas
- Louis Terrone, quarterback
- Paul Urik
- Beto Vairo, halfback
- Zanieski, halfback
- Frank Zoppetti, quarterback
