= 1936 Fordham Rams football team =

American college football season

1936 Fordham Rams football
- Conference: Independent

Ranking
- AP: No. 15
- Record: 5–1–2
- Head coach: Jim Crowley (4th season)
- Home stadium: Polo Grounds

1936 Eastern college football independents records
| | Conf. | | | Overall |
| Team | W | L | T | W | | L | | T |
|---|---|---|---|---|---|---|---|---|
| Middlebury | | – | | 8 | – | 0 | – | 0 |
| Saint Anselm | | – | | 6 | – | 0 | – | 1 |
| No. 3 Pittsburgh | | – | | 8 | – | 1 | – | 1 |
| No. 10 Penn | | – | | 7 | – | 1 | – | 0 |
| No. 12 Yale | | – | | 7 | – | 1 | – | 0 |
| No. 13 Dartmouth | | – | | 7 | – | 1 | – | 1 |
| Franklin & Marshall | | – | | 7 | – | 1 | – | 1 |
| No. 14 Duquesne | | – | | 8 | – | 2 | – | 0 |
| Boston College | | – | | 6 | – | 1 | – | 2 |
| Boston University | | – | | 5 | – | 1 | – | 2 |
| No. 15 Fordham | | – | | 5 | – | 1 | – | 2 |
| Holy Cross | | – | | 7 | – | 2 | – | 1 |
| Villanova | | – | | 7 | – | 2 | – | 1 |
| Army | | – | | 6 | – | 3 | – | 0 |
| Colgate | | – | | 6 | – | 3 | – | 0 |
| Drexel | | – | | 6 | – | 3 | – | 0 |
| Temple | | – | | 6 | – | 3 | – | 2 |
| La Salle | | – | | 6 | – | 3 | – | 1 |
| Buffalo | | – | | 5 | – | 3 | – | 0 |
| Columbia | | – | | 5 | – | 3 | – | 0 |
| Princeton | | – | | 4 | – | 2 | – | 2 |
| Saint Vincent | | – | | 5 | – | 3 | – | 0 |
| NYU | | – | | 5 | – | 3 | – | 1 |
| Manhattan | | – | | 6 | – | 4 | – | 0 |
| Northeastern | | – | | 5 | – | 4 | – | 0 |
| Bucknell | | – | | 4 | – | 4 | – | 1 |
| CCNY | | – | | 4 | – | 4 | – | 0 |
| Tufts | | – | | 3 | – | 3 | – | 1 |
| Harvard | | – | | 3 | – | 4 | – | 1 |
| Cornell | | – | | 3 | – | 5 | – | 0 |
| Penn State | | – | | 3 | – | 5 | – | 0 |
| Westminster (PA) | | – | | 2 | – | 4 | – | 1 |
| Brown | | – | | 3 | – | 7 | – | 0 |
| Carnegie Tech | | – | | 2 | – | 6 | – | 0 |
| Massachusetts State | | – | | 2 | – | 6 | – | 0 |
| Providence | | – | | 1 | – | 7 | – | 0 |
| Syracuse | | – | | 1 | – | 7 | – | 0 |
| Vermont | | – | | 1 | – | 8 | – | 0 |
Rankings from AP Poll

The 1936 Fordham Rams football team was an American football team that represented Fordham University as an independent during the 1936 college football season. In their fourth year under head coach Jim Crowley, the Rams compiled a 5–1–2 record and were ranked 15th in the final AP rankings in the first year for the poll.

The offense scored 128 points over eight games, while the defense allowed no more than seven points in any game, and shut out three teams, including second-ranked Pittsburgh. The team is best remembered for its line, the Seven Blocks of Granite, which included future National Football League (NFL) head coach Vince Lombardi. The line coach was Frank Leahy.

By mid-November, the Rams were 5–0–1 and ranked third with two games to play, and the leading candidate for a Rose Bowl invitation, but a tie with Georgia at the Polo Grounds dropped them to eighth. Five days later at Yankee Stadium on Thanksgiving, the NYU Violets handed the Rams a 7–6 defeat. Right guard Lombardi called it "the most devastating loss of my life," dashing the hopes of a bowl game. (The previous year, Fordham had spoiled NYU's undefeated season and bowl hopes with a 21–0 shutout.)

== Schedule ==
| Date | Opponent | Rank | Site | Result | Attendance | Source |
|---|---|---|---|---|---|---|
| October 3 | Franklin & Marshall | | Randall's Island Stadium; New York, NY | W 66–7 | 12,000 | |
| October 10 | SMU | | Polo Grounds; New York, NY | W 7–0 | 30,000 | |
| October 17 | Waynesburg | | Randall's Island Stadium; New York, NY | W 20–6 | 3,000 | |
| October 24 | No. 12 Saint Mary's | No. 16 | Polo Grounds; New York, NY | W 7–6 | 50,000 | |
| October 31 | No. 2 Pittsburgh | No. 5 | Polo Grounds; New York, NY | T 0–0 | 57,000 | |
| November 7 | Purdue | No. 3 | Polo Grounds; New York, NY | W 15–0 | 40,000 | |
| November 21 | Georgia | No. 3 | Polo Grounds; New York, NY | T 7–7 | 35,000 | |
| November 26 | vs. NYU | No. 8 | Yankee Stadium; Bronx, NY | L 6–7 | 50,000 | |
Rankings from AP Poll released prior to the game

== Rankings ==
Ranking movements Legend: ██ Increase in ranking ██ Decrease in ranking ( ) = First-place votes
| | Week | | | | | | |
| Poll | 1 | 2 | 3 | 4 | 5 | 6 | Final |
|---|---|---|---|---|---|---|---|
| AP | 16 | 5 | 3 (2) | 3 (3) | 3 (4) | 8 | 15 |
