= 1936 Cornell Big Red football team =

American college football season

1936 Cornell Big Red football
- Conference: Independent
- Record: 3–5
- Head coach: Carl Snavely (1st season)
- Offensive scheme: Single-wing
- Captain: John Batten
- Home stadium: Schoellkopf Field

1936 Eastern college football independents records
	Conf.			Overall
Team	W	L	T	W		L		T
Middlebury		–		8	–	0	–	0
Saint Anselm		–		6	–	0	–	1
No. 3 Pittsburgh		–		8	–	1	–	1
No. 10 Penn		–		7	–	1	–	0
No. 12 Yale		–		7	–	1	–	0
No. 13 Dartmouth		–		7	–	1	–	1
Franklin & Marshall		–		7	–	1	–	1
No. 14 Duquesne		–		8	–	2	–	0
Boston College		–		6	–	1	–	2
Boston University		–		5	–	1	–	2
No. 15 Fordham		–		5	–	1	–	2
Holy Cross		–		7	–	2	–	1
Villanova		–		7	–	2	–	1
Army		–		6	–	3	–	0
Colgate		–		6	–	3	–	0
Drexel		–		6	–	3	–	0
Temple		–		6	–	3	–	2
La Salle		–		6	–	3	–	1
Buffalo		–		5	–	3	–	0
Columbia		–		5	–	3	–	0
Princeton		–		4	–	2	–	2
Saint Vincent		–		5	–	3	–	0
NYU		–		5	–	3	–	1
Manhattan		–		6	–	4	–	0
Northeastern		–		5	–	4	–	0
Bucknell		–		4	–	4	–	1
CCNY		–		4	–	4	–	0
Tufts		–		3	–	3	–	1
Harvard		–		3	–	4	–	1
Cornell		–		3	–	5	–	0
Penn State		–		3	–	5	–	0
Westminster (PA)		–		2	–	4	–	1
Brown		–		3	–	7	–	0
Carnegie Tech		–		2	–	6	–	0
Massachusetts State		–		2	–	6	–	0
Providence		–		1	–	7	–	0
Syracuse		–		1	–	7	–	0
Vermont		–		1	–	8	–	0
Rankings from AP Poll

The 1936 Cornell Big Red football team was an American football team that represented Cornell University during the 1936 college football season. In their first season under head coach Carl Snavely, the Big Red compiled a 3–5 record and outscored their opponents by a combined total of 145 to 132.

== Schedule ==
Date	Opponent	Site	Result	Attendance	Source
September 26	Alfred	Schoellkopf Field; Ithaca, NY	W 74–0		
October 3	at Yale	Yale Bowl; New Haven, CT	L 0–23		
October 17	Syracuse	Schoellkopf Field; Ithaca, NY	W 20–7	15,000	
October 24	Penn State	Schoellkopf Field; Ithaca, NY	W 13–7	6,000	
October 31	at Columbia	Baker Field; New York, NY (rivalry)	L 13–20	28,000	
November 7	at Princeton	Palmer Stadium; Princeton, NJ	L 13–41	25,000	
November 14	No. 12 Dartmouth	Schoellkopf Field; Ithaca, NY (rivalry)	L 6–20		
November 26	at Penn	Franklin Field; Philadelphia, PA (rivalry)	L 6–14		
Rankings from AP Poll released prior to the game
