= 1936 Colgate Red Raiders football team =

American college football season

1936 Colgate Red Raiders football
- Conference: Independent
- Record: 6–3
- Head coach: Andrew Kerr (8th season)
- Captain: George Vadas
- Home stadium: Whitnall Field

1936 Eastern college football independents records
	Conf.			Overall
Team	W	L	T	W		L		T
Middlebury		–		8	–	0	–	0
Saint Anselm		–		6	–	0	–	1
No. 3 Pittsburgh		–		8	–	1	–	1
No. 10 Penn		–		7	–	1	–	0
No. 12 Yale		–		7	–	1	–	0
No. 13 Dartmouth		–		7	–	1	–	1
Franklin & Marshall		–		7	–	1	–	1
No. 14 Duquesne		–		8	–	2	–	0
Boston College		–		6	–	1	–	2
Boston University		–		5	–	1	–	2
No. 15 Fordham		–		5	–	1	–	2
Holy Cross		–		7	–	2	–	1
Villanova		–		7	–	2	–	1
Army		–		6	–	3	–	0
Colgate		–		6	–	3	–	0
Drexel		–		6	–	3	–	0
Temple		–		6	–	3	–	2
La Salle		–		6	–	3	–	1
Buffalo		–		5	–	3	–	0
Columbia		–		5	–	3	–	0
Princeton		–		4	–	2	–	2
Saint Vincent		–		5	–	3	–	0
NYU		–		5	–	3	–	1
Manhattan		–		6	–	4	–	0
Northeastern		–		5	–	4	–	0
Bucknell		–		4	–	4	–	1
CCNY		–		4	–	4	–	0
Tufts		–		3	–	3	–	1
Harvard		–		3	–	4	–	1
Cornell		–		3	–	5	–	0
Penn State		–		3	–	5	–	0
Westminster (PA)		–		2	–	4	–	1
Brown		–		3	–	7	–	0
Carnegie Tech		–		2	–	6	–	0
Massachusetts State		–		2	–	6	–	0
Providence		–		1	–	7	–	0
Syracuse		–		1	–	7	–	0
Vermont		–		1	–	8	–	0
Rankings from AP Poll

The 1936 Colgate Red Raiders football team was an American football team that represented Colgate University as an independent during the 1936 college football season. In its eighth season under head coach Andrew Kerr, the team compiled a 6–3 record and outscored opponents by a total of 199 to 67. George Vadas was the team captain. The team played its home games on Whitnall Field in Hamilton, New York.

== Schedule ==
Date	Opponent	Site	Result	Attendance	Source
September 26	at Duke	Duke Stadium; Durham, NC	L 0–6	22,360	
October 3	Ursinus	Whitnall Field; Hamilton, NY	W 54–0		
October 10	St. Lawrence	Whitnall Field; Hamilton, NY	W 26–6		
October 17	vs. Tulane	Polo Grounds; New York, NY	L 6–28	18,000	
October 24	Lafayette	Whitnall Field; Hamilton, NY	W 41–0		
October 31	at No. 6 Army	Michie Stadium; West Point, NY	W 14–7		
November 7	at Holy Cross	Fitton Field; Worcester, MA	L 13–20		
November 21	at Syracuse	Archbold Stadium; Syracuse, NY (rivalry)	W 13–0	20,000	
November 28	at Brown	Andrews Field; Providence, RI	W 32–0		
Rankings from AP Poll released prior to the game
