= 1936 Boston College Eagles football team =

American college football season

1936 Boston College Eagles football
- Conference: Independent
- Record: 6–1–2
- Head coach: Gil Dobie (1st season)
- Offensive scheme: Single-wing
- Base defense: 6–3–2
- Captain: Alex Pszenny
- Home stadium: Alumni Field; Fenway Park

1936 Eastern college football independents records
	Conf.			Overall
Team	W	L	T	W		L		T
Middlebury		–		8	–	0	–	0
Saint Anselm		–		6	–	0	–	1
No. 3 Pittsburgh		–		8	–	1	–	1
No. 10 Penn		–		7	–	1	–	0
No. 12 Yale		–		7	–	1	–	0
No. 13 Dartmouth		–		7	–	1	–	1
Franklin & Marshall		–		7	–	1	–	1
No. 14 Duquesne		–		8	–	2	–	0
Boston College		–		6	–	1	–	2
Boston University		–		5	–	1	–	2
No. 15 Fordham		–		5	–	1	–	2
Holy Cross		–		7	–	2	–	1
Villanova		–		7	–	2	–	1
Army		–		6	–	3	–	0
Colgate		–		6	–	3	–	0
Drexel		–		6	–	3	–	0
Temple		–		6	–	3	–	2
La Salle		–		6	–	3	–	1
Buffalo		–		5	–	3	–	0
Columbia		–		5	–	3	–	0
Princeton		–		4	–	2	–	2
Saint Vincent		–		5	–	3	–	0
NYU		–		5	–	3	–	1
Manhattan		–		6	–	4	–	0
Northeastern		–		5	–	4	–	0
Bucknell		–		4	–	4	–	1
CCNY		–		4	–	4	–	0
Tufts		–		3	–	3	–	1
Harvard		–		3	–	4	–	1
Cornell		–		3	–	5	–	0
Penn State		–		3	–	5	–	0
Westminster (PA)		–		2	–	4	–	1
Brown		–		3	–	7	–	0
Carnegie Tech		–		2	–	6	–	0
Massachusetts State		–		2	–	6	–	0
Providence		–		1	–	7	–	0
Syracuse		–		1	–	7	–	0
Vermont		–		1	–	8	–	0
Rankings from AP Poll

The 1936 Boston College Eagles football team represented Boston College as an independent during the 1936 college football season. Led by first-year head coach Gil Dobie, the Eagles compiled a record of 6–1–2. Boston College played home games at Alumni Field in Chestnut Hill, Massachusetts, and Fenway Park in Boston.

== Schedule ==
Date	Time	Opponent	Site	Result	Attendance	Source
October 3		Northeastern	Alumni Field; Chestnut Hill, MA	W 26–6	7,500	
October 12	2:30 p.m.	Temple	Fenway Park; Boston, MA	L 0–14	24,000	
October 17		at New Hampshire	Lewis Field; Durham, NH	W 12–0	1,200	
October 24		Providence	Alumni Field; Chestnut Hill, MA	W 26–0	10,000	
October 31		Michigan State	Fenway Park; Boston, MA	T 13–13	11,000	
November 7		NC State	Fenway Park; Boston, MA	W 7–3	5,600–10,000	
November 14		Western Maryland	Alumni Field; Chestnut Hill, MA	W 12–7	15,000	
November 21	2:00 p.m.	Boston University	Fenway Park; Boston, MA (rivalry)	T 0–0	15,000	
November 28		Holy Cross	Fenway Park; Boston, MA (rivalry)	W 13–12	28,000	
All times are in Eastern time
