= 1936 Penn State Nittany Lions football team =

American college football season

1936 Penn State Nittany Lions football
- Conference: Independent
- Record: 3–5
- Head coach: Bob Higgins (7th season)
- Captain: Chuck Cherundolo
- Home stadium: New Beaver Field

1936 Eastern college football independents records
	Conf.			Overall
Team	W	L	T	W		L		T
Middlebury		–		8	–	0	–	0
Saint Anselm		–		6	–	0	–	1
No. 3 Pittsburgh		–		8	–	1	–	1
No. 10 Penn		–		7	–	1	–	0
No. 12 Yale		–		7	–	1	–	0
No. 13 Dartmouth		–		7	–	1	–	1
Franklin & Marshall		–		7	–	1	–	1
No. 14 Duquesne		–		8	–	2	–	0
Boston College		–		6	–	1	–	2
Boston University		–		5	–	1	–	2
No. 15 Fordham		–		5	–	1	–	2
Holy Cross		–		7	–	2	–	1
Villanova		–		7	–	2	–	1
Army		–		6	–	3	–	0
Colgate		–		6	–	3	–	0
Drexel		–		6	–	3	–	0
Temple		–		6	–	3	–	2
La Salle		–		6	–	3	–	1
Buffalo		–		5	–	3	–	0
Columbia		–		5	–	3	–	0
Princeton		–		4	–	2	–	2
Saint Vincent		–		5	–	3	–	0
NYU		–		5	–	3	–	1
Manhattan		–		6	–	4	–	0
Northeastern		–		5	–	4	–	0
Bucknell		–		4	–	4	–	1
CCNY		–		4	–	4	–	0
Tufts		–		3	–	3	–	1
Harvard		–		3	–	4	–	1
Cornell		–		3	–	5	–	0
Penn State		–		3	–	5	–	0
Westminster (PA)		–		2	–	4	–	1
Brown		–		3	–	7	–	0
Carnegie Tech		–		2	–	6	–	0
Massachusetts State		–		2	–	6	–	0
Providence		–		1	–	7	–	0
Syracuse		–		1	–	7	–	0
Vermont		–		1	–	8	–	0
Rankings from AP Poll

The 1936 Penn State Nittany Lions football team represented the Pennsylvania State University as an independent during the 1936 college football season.

== Schedule ==
Date	Opponent	Site	Result	Attendance	Source
October 3	Muhlenberg	New Beaver Field; State College, PA	W 45–0	7,535	
October 10	Villanova^{†}	New Beaver Field; State College, PA	L 0–13	9,593	
October 17	at Lehigh	Taylor Stadium; Bethlehem, PA	L 6–7		
October 24	at Cornell	Schoellkopf Field; Ithaca, NY	L 7–13	6,000	
October 31	Syracuse	New Beaver Field; State College, PA (rivalry)	W 18–0	7,137	
November 7	at No. 5 Pittsburgh	Pitt Stadium; Pittsburgh, PA (rivalry)	L 7–34	15,692	
November 14	at No. 11 Penn	Franklin Field; Philadelphia, PA	L 12–19	40,000	
November 21	Bucknell	New Beaver Field; State College, PA	W 14–0	9,227–12,000	
^{†}Homecoming; Rankings from AP Poll released prior to the game
