= 1936 Dartmouth Indians football team =

American college football season

1936 Dartmouth Indians football
- Conference: Independent

Ranking
- AP: No. 13
- Record: 7–1–1
- Head coach: Earl Blaik (3rd season)
- Home stadium: Memorial Field

1936 Eastern college football independents records
	Conf.			Overall
Team	W	L	T	W		L		T
Middlebury		–		8	–	0	–	0
Saint Anselm		–		6	–	0	–	1
No. 3 Pittsburgh		–		8	–	1	–	1
No. 10 Penn		–		7	–	1	–	0
No. 12 Yale		–		7	–	1	–	0
No. 13 Dartmouth		–		7	–	1	–	1
Franklin & Marshall		–		7	–	1	–	1
No. 14 Duquesne		–		8	–	2	–	0
Boston College		–		6	–	1	–	2
Boston University		–		5	–	1	–	2
No. 15 Fordham		–		5	–	1	–	2
Holy Cross		–		7	–	2	–	1
Villanova		–		7	–	2	–	1
Army		–		6	–	3	–	0
Colgate		–		6	–	3	–	0
Drexel		–		6	–	3	–	0
Temple		–		6	–	3	–	2
La Salle		–		6	–	3	–	1
Buffalo		–		5	–	3	–	0
Columbia		–		5	–	3	–	0
Princeton		–		4	–	2	–	2
Saint Vincent		–		5	–	3	–	0
NYU		–		5	–	3	–	1
Manhattan		–		6	–	4	–	0
Northeastern		–		5	–	4	–	0
Bucknell		–		4	–	4	–	1
CCNY		–		4	–	4	–	0
Tufts		–		3	–	3	–	1
Harvard		–		3	–	4	–	1
Cornell		–		3	–	5	–	0
Penn State		–		3	–	5	–	0
Westminster (PA)		–		2	–	4	–	1
Brown		–		3	–	7	–	0
Carnegie Tech		–		2	–	6	–	0
Massachusetts State		–		2	–	6	–	0
Providence		–		1	–	7	–	0
Syracuse		–		1	–	7	–	0
Vermont		–		1	–	8	–	0
Rankings from AP Poll

The 1936 Dartmouth Indians football team represented Dartmouth College in the 1936 college football season. The Indians were led by third-year head coach Earl Blaik and played their home games at Memorial Field in Hanover, New Hampshire. The Indians finished with a record of 7–1–1, and in the inaugural year of the AP Poll, finished in 13th in the final rankings.

== Schedule ==
Date	Opponent	Rank	Site	Result	Attendance	Source
September 26	Norwich		Memorial Field; Hanover, NH	W 58–0		
October 3	Vermont		Memorial Field; Hanover, NH	W 56–0		
October 10	Holy Cross		Memorial Field; Hanover, NH	L 0–7		
October 17	Brown		Memorial Field; Hanover, NH	W 34–0		
October 24	at Harvard		Harvard Stadium; Boston, MA (rivalry)	W 26–7	> 35,000	
October 31	at No. 12 Yale		Yale Bowl; New Haven, CT	W 11–7		
November 7	Columbia	No. 18	Memorial Field; Hanover, NH	W 20–13		
November 14	at Cornell	No. 12	Schoellkopf Field; Ithaca, NY (rivalry)	W 20–6		
November 21	at Princeton	No. 12	Palmer Stadium; Princeton, NJ	T 13–13	45,000	
Rankings from AP Poll released prior to the game; Source:
