= 1936 Saint Anselm Hawks football team =

American college football season

1925 Saint Anselm Hawks football
- Conference: Independent
- Record: 6–0–1
- Head coach: Cleo A. O'Donnell (2nd season)
- Home stadium: Textile Field

1936 Eastern college football independents records
	Conf.			Overall
Team	W	L	T	W		L		T
Middlebury		–		8	–	0	–	0
Saint Anselm		–		6	–	0	–	1
No. 3 Pittsburgh		–		8	–	1	–	1
No. 10 Penn		–		7	–	1	–	0
No. 12 Yale		–		7	–	1	–	0
No. 13 Dartmouth		–		7	–	1	–	1
Franklin & Marshall		–		7	–	1	–	1
No. 14 Duquesne		–		8	–	2	–	0
Boston College		–		6	–	1	–	2
Boston University		–		5	–	1	–	2
No. 15 Fordham		–		5	–	1	–	2
Holy Cross		–		7	–	2	–	1
Villanova		–		7	–	2	–	1
Army		–		6	–	3	–	0
Colgate		–		6	–	3	–	0
Drexel		–		6	–	3	–	0
Temple		–		6	–	3	–	2
La Salle		–		6	–	3	–	1
Buffalo		–		5	–	3	–	0
Columbia		–		5	–	3	–	0
Princeton		–		4	–	2	–	2
Saint Vincent		–		5	–	3	–	0
NYU		–		5	–	3	–	1
Manhattan		–		6	–	4	–	0
Northeastern		–		5	–	4	–	0
Bucknell		–		4	–	4	–	1
CCNY		–		4	–	4	–	0
Tufts		–		3	–	3	–	1
Harvard		–		3	–	4	–	1
Cornell		–		3	–	5	–	0
Penn State		–		3	–	5	–	0
Westminster (PA)		–		2	–	4	–	1
Brown		–		3	–	7	–	0
Carnegie Tech		–		2	–	6	–	0
Massachusetts State		–		2	–	6	–	0
Providence		–		1	–	7	–	0
Syracuse		–		1	–	7	–	0
Vermont		–		1	–	8	–	0
Rankings from AP Poll

The 1936 Saint Anselm Hawks football team was an American football team that represented Saint Anselm College as an independent during the 1936 college football season. Under second-year head coach Cleo A. O'Donnell, the team compiled a 6–0–1 record and outscored opponents by a total of 137 to 4. The team ended the season by shutting out a Holy Cross that had been under consideration for an invitation to play in the 1937 Rose Bowl.

The team shut out five of seven opponents and allowed zero points on defense, opponents' total tally of four points coming on two safeties. The United Press recognized Saint Anselm for having "the best defensive record of any college in the United States."

Quarterback Charles Pelonzi and center Mike Malio were late inducted into the Saint Anselm Athletics Hall of Fame.

The team played its home games at Textile Field, later renamed Gill Stadium, in Manchester, New Hampshire.

== Schedule ==
Date	Opponent	Site	Result	Attendance	Source
September 30	at Springfield	Springfield, MA	W 14–0		
October 10	Ithaca	Manchester, NH	W 20–0		
October 18	at Providence	Providence, RI	W 7–2	4,000	
October 31	at New Hampshire	Durham, NH	W 31–2		
November 7	Northeastern	Textile Field; Manchester, NH	W 19–0		
November 14	Arnold	Manchester, NH	W 46–0		
November 21	at Holy Cross	Fitton Field; Worcester, MA	T 0–0	15,000	
