= Manhattan Jaspers football, 1930–1939 =

American college football season

1930–1939 Manhattan Jaspers football
- Conference: Independent
- Head coach: John B. Law (1930–1931); Chick Meehan (1932–1937); Herb Kopf (1938–1942)
- Home stadium: Ebbets Field, Polo Grounds, Yankee Stadium, Manhattan Field, Innisfail Park, Randall's Island Stadium, Jasper Field

The Mahattan Jaspers football program, 1930–1939 represented Manhattan College during the 1930s as an independent in college football. The program was led by head coaches John B. Law (1930–1931), Chick Meehan (1932–1937), and Herb Kopf (1938–1942). They played home games at multiple venues, including Ebbets Field in Flatbush, the Polo Grounds in Upper Manhattan, Yankee Stadium in The Bronx, and Randall's Island Stadium on Randall's Island, Manhattan.

Highlights of the decade included:

- The 1932 team compiled a 6–2–2 record in the regular season before losing a close game to Miami (FL) in the Palm Festival.
- The 1934 team compiled a 3–5–1 as the Jaspers elevated their schedule to play tougher competition, including losses to Georgetown, Michigan State, and Holy Cross, and a tie with Kansas State.
- The 1936 team compiled a 6–4 record, largely against intersectional powers with losses to Holy Cross and Texas A&M and victories over NC State, Kentucky, and Georgetown.
- The 1937 team compiled a 6–3–1, again playing a schedule against multiple intersectional opponents, including losses to Texas A&M and Kentucky and victories over Michigan State, Georgetown, Detroit, and NC State.

== 1930 ==
1930 Manhattan Jaspers football
- Conference: Independent
- Record: 4–3–1
- Head coach: John B. Law (1st season)
- Captain: John Luddy Burke
- Home stadium: Innisfail Park, Polo Grounds

1930 Eastern college football independents records
	Conf.			Overall
Team	W	L	T	W		L		T
Colgate		–		9	–	1	–	0
Fordham		–		8	–	1	–	0
No. 9 Army		–		9	–	1	–	1
No. 8 Dartmouth		–		7	–	1	–	1
St. John's		–		7	–	1	–	0
NYU		–		7	–	3	–	0
Cornell		–		6	–	2	–	0
Pittsburgh		–		6	–	2	–	1
Washington & Jefferson		–		6	–	2	–	1
Tufts		–		5	–	2	–	0
Temple		–		7	–	3	–	0
Bucknell		–		6	–	3	–	0
Carnegie Tech		–		6	–	3	–	0
Duquesne		–		6	–	3	–	0
Syracuse		–		5	–	2	–	2
Yale		–		5	–	2	–	2
CCNY		–		5	–	2	–	1
Brown		–		6	–	3	–	1
Drexel		–		6	–	3	–	1
Franklin & Marshall		–		5	–	3	–	1
Manhattan		–		4	–	3	–	1
Columbia		–		5	–	4	–	0
Penn		–		5	–	4	–	0
Boston College		–		5	–	5	–	0
Villanova		–		5	–	5	–	0
Penn State		–		3	–	4	–	2
Harvard		–		3	–	4	–	1
Providence		–		3	–	4	–	1
Princeton		–		1	–	5	–	1
Boston University		–		1	–	7	–	1
Vermont		–		1	–	7	–	1
Massachusetts		–		1	–	8	–	0
Rankings from Dickinson System

The 1930 Manhattan Jaspers football team represented Manhattan College as an independent during the 1930 college football season. In their first year under head coach John B. Law, the Jaspers compiled a 4–3–1 record.

=== Schedule ===
Date	Opponent	Site	Result	Attendance	Source
September 27	Rider	Innisfail Park; Bronx, NY	L 7–14		
October 4	at Seton Hall	Newark Schools Stadium; Newark, NJ	W 21–0		
October 10	Oglethorpe	Polo Grounds; New York, NY	L 0–19	15,000	
October 18	RPI	Innisfail Park; Bronx, NY	W 13–7		
November 1	at CCNY	Lewisohn Stadium; New York, NY	T 6–6		
November 4	Baltimore	Innisfail Park; Bronx, NY	W 52–0	2,000	
November 14	Catholic University	Innisfail Park; Bronx, NY	W 7–6		
November 22	at St. John's	Dexter Park; Queens, NY	L 19–21	8,000	

== 1931 ==
1931 Manhattan Jaspers football
- Conference: Independent
- Record: 4–2–1
- Head coach: John B. Law (2nd season)
- Home stadium: Jasper Field, Polo Grounds

1931 Eastern college football independents records
	Conf.			Overall
Team	W	L	T	W		L		T
Bucknell		–		6	–	0	–	3
Colgate		–		8	–	1	–	0
No. 9 Pittsburgh		–		8	–	1	–	0
Cornell		–		7	–	1	–	0
Drexel		–		7	–	1	–	0
No. 7 Harvard		–		7	–	1	–	0
Temple		–		8	–	1	–	1
Columbia		–		7	–	1	–	1
Massachusetts State		–		7	–	1	–	1
Syracuse		–		7	–	1	–	1
Fordham		–		6	–	1	–	2
No. 8 Yale		–		5	–	1	–	2
Army		–		8	–	2	–	1
Franklin & Marshall		–		6	–	2	–	0
Manhattan		–		4	–	2	–	1
Brown		–		7	–	3	–	0
Providence		–		7	–	3	–	0
Penn		–		6	–	3	–	0
NYU		–		6	–	3	–	1
Boston College		–		6	–	4	–	0
Washington & Jefferson		–		6	–	4	–	0
Tufts		–		3	–	2	–	2
Villanova		–		4	–	3	–	2
La Salle		–		4	–	4	–	0
Duquesne		–		3	–	5	–	3
Carnegie Tech		–		3	–	5	–	1
St. John's		–		3	–	5	–	1
CCNY		–		2	–	5	–	1
Boston University		–		2	–	7	–	0
Penn State		–		2	–	8	–	0
Princeton		–		1	–	7	–	0
Vermont		–		1	–	8	–	0
Rankings from Dickinson System

The 1931 Manhattan Jaspers football team represented Manhattan College as an independent during the 1931 college football season. In their second year under head coach John B. Law, the Jaspers compiled a 4–2–1 record.

=== Schedule ===
Date	Opponent	Site	Result	Attendance	Source
October 3	Baltimore	Jasper Field; New York, NY	W 87–0		
October 9	Oglethorpe	Polo Grounds; New York, NY	W 13–0	15,000	
October 17	at Colgate	Whitnall Field; Hamilton, NY	L 0–33	4,000	
November 3	vs. CCNY	Polo Grounds; New York, NY	T 0–0	10,000	
November 7	at Catholic University	Brookland Stadium; Washington, DC	L 6–19		
November 14	at Boston University	Nickerson Field; Weston, MA	W 12–0		
November 21	St. John's	Jasper Field; New York, NY	W 8–7		

== 1932 ==
1932 Manhattan Jaspers football

Palm Festival, L 0–7 vs. Miami (FL)
- Conference: Independent
- Record: 6–3–2
- Head coach: Chick Meehan (1st season)
- Home stadium: Ebbets Field, Polo Grounds, Yankee Stadium, Manhattan Field

1932 Eastern college football independents records
	Conf.			Overall
Team	W	L	T	W		L		T
No. 5 Colgate		–		9	–	0	–	0
Brown		–		7	–	1	–	0
Columbia		–		7	–	1	–	1
Pittsburgh		–		8	–	1	–	2
No. 8 Army		–		8	–	2	–	0
Drexel		–		5	–	1	–	1
Massachusetts State		–		7	–	2	–	0
Villanova		–		7	–	2	–	0
Duquesne		–		7	–	2	–	1
Fordham		–		6	–	2	–	0
Penn		–		6	–	2	–	0
Temple		–		5	–	1	–	2
Tufts		–		5	–	1	–	2
Cornell		–		5	–	2	–	1
Franklin & Marshall		–		4	–	2	–	1
Boston College		–		4	–	2	–	2
La Salle		–		4	–	2	–	2
Harvard		–		5	–	3	–	0
NYU		–		5	–	3	–	0
Washington & Jefferson		–		5	–	3	–	1
Manhattan		–		6	–	3	–	2
Carnegie Tech		–		4	–	3	–	2
Bucknell		–		4	–	4	–	1
Syracuse		–		4	–	4	–	1
Princeton		–		2	–	2	–	3
Yale		–		2	–	2	–	3
Boston University		–		2	–	3	–	2
Vermont		–		2	–	4	–	1
CCNY		–		2	–	5	–	0
Penn State		–		2	–	5	–	0
Rankings from Dickinson System

The 1932 Manhattan Jaspers football team represented Manhattan College as an independent during the 1932 college football season. In their first season under head coach Chick Meehan, the Jaspers compiled a 6–3–2 record. On January 1, 1933, the team played in the first Palm Festival game, predecessor to the Orange Bowl, in Miami.

=== Schedule ===
Date	Opponent	Site	Result	Attendance	Source
September 24	St. Bonaventure	Manhattan Field; New York, NY	T 6–6		
October 1	Saint Joseph's	Ebbets Field; Brooklyn, NY	W 32–2	10,000	
October 8	Seton Hall	Ebbets Field; Brooklyn, NY	W 31–0	15,000	
October 15	St. Thomas	Ebbets Field; Brooklyn, NY	L 0–7		
October 22	Catholic University	Ebbets Field; Brooklyn, NY	L 7–12	20,000	
October 29	Oglethorpe	Polo Grounds; New York, NY	W 20–7	15,000	
November 8	CCNY	Polo Grounds; New York, NY	W 13–6	7,000	
November 12	Clarkson Tech	Ebbets Field; Brooklyn, NY	W 28–0		
November 19	Holy Cross	Yankee Stadium; Bronx, NY	T 0–0	8,000	
December 3	Rutgers	Ebbets Field; Brooklyn, NY	W 7–6	15,000	
January 2, 1933	at Miami (FL)	Moore Park; Miami, FL (Palm Festival)	L 0–7	7,500	

=

== 1933 ==
1933 Manhattan Jaspers football
- Conference: Independent
- Record: 5–3–1
- Head coach: Chick Meehan (2nd season)
- Home stadium: Ebbets Field, Manhattan Field

1933 Eastern college football independents records
	Conf.			Overall
Team	W	L	T	W		L		T
No. 7 Princeton		–		9	–	0	–	0
Duquesne		–		10	–	1	–	0
No. 9 Army		–		9	–	1	–	0
Boston College		–		8	–	1	–	0
Columbia		–		8	–	1	–	0
Pittsburgh		–		8	–	1	–	0
Colgate		–		6	–	1	–	1
Bucknell		–		7	–	2	–	0
Fordham		–		6	–	2	–	0
Tufts		–		6	–	2	–	0
Villanova		–		7	–	2	–	1
Harvard		–		5	–	2	–	1
Drexel		–		5	–	3	–	0
Massachusetts State		–		5	–	3	–	0
Temple		–		5	–	3	–	0
Manhattan		–		5	–	3	–	1
Cornell		–		4	–	3	–	0
Carnegie Tech		–		4	–	3	–	2
La Salle		–		3	–	3	–	2
Syracuse		–		4	–	4	–	0
Yale		–		4	–	4	–	0
Penn State		–		3	–	3	–	1
Brown		–		3	–	5	–	0
Vermont		–		3	–	5	–	0
Franklin & Marshall		–		4	–	5	–	0
NYU		–		2	–	4	–	1
Penn		–		2	–	4	–	1
Northeastern		–		1	–	3	–	1
Boston University		–		2	–	5	–	0
Washington & Jefferson		–		2	–	7	–	1
CCNY		–		1	–	5	–	1
Rankings from Dickinson System

The 1933 Manhattan Jaspers football team represented Manhattan College as an independent during the 1933 college football season. In their second season under head coach Chick Meehan, the Jaspers compiled a 5–3–1 record.

=== Schedule ===
Date	Opponent	Site	Result	Attendance	Source
September 23	St. Bonaventure	Ebbets Field; Brooklyn, NY	W 6–0		
September 30	Clarkson Tech	Manhattan Field; New York, NY	W 13–7	6,000	
October 7	Oglethorpe	Ebbets Field; Brooklyn, NY	L 0–6		
October 14	Georgetown	Ebbets Field; Brooklyn, NY	T 20–20	18,000	
October 21	Brooklyn	Ebbets Field; Brooklyn, NY	W 28–0		
October 28	Villanova	Ebbets Field; Brooklyn, NY	L 0–47		
November 4	CCNY	Ebbets Field; Brooklyn, NY	W 24–0	3,500	
November 11	Holy Cross	Ebbets Field; Brooklyn, NY	L 6–27		
November 18	Catholic University	Ebbets Field; Brooklyn, NY	W 7–0		

== 1934 ==
1934 Manhattan Jaspers football
- Conference: Independent
- Record: 3–5–1
- Head coach: Chick Meehan (3rd season)
- Home stadium: Ebbets Field

1934 Eastern college football independents records
	Conf.			Overall
Team	W	L	T	W		L		T
Tufts		–		8	–	0	–	0
Trinity (CT)		–		7	–	0	–	0
La Salle		–		7	–	0	–	1
Washington College		–		5	–	0	–	1
Franklin & Marshall		–		8	–	1	–	0
No. 4 Pittsburgh		–		8	–	1	–	0
No. 8 Colgate		–		7	–	1	–	0
Columbia		–		7	–	1	–	0
No. 5 Princeton		–		7	–	1	–	0
Duquesne		–		8	–	2	–	0
Holy Cross		–		8	–	2	–	0
No. 15 Temple		–		7	–	1	–	2
No. 10 Syracuse		–		6	–	2	–	0
Bucknell		–		7	–	2	–	2
No. 14 Army		–		7	–	3	–	0
Northeastern		–		6	–	1	–	1
Rochester		–		5	–	2	–	0
Dartmouth		–		6	–	3	–	0
Saint Anselm		–		6	–	3	–	0
Amherst		–		5	–	3	–	0
Fordham		–		5	–	3	–	0
Yale		–		5	–	3	–	0
Massachusetts State		–		5	–	3	–	1
CCNY		–		4	–	3	–	0
Providence		–		4	–	3	–	0
Drexel		–		4	–	3	–	1
Boston College		–		5	–	4	–	0
Bates		–		3	–	3	–	1
Middlebury		–		3	–	3	–	1
Penn		–		4	–	4	–	0
Penn State		–		4	–	4	–	0
Williams		–		4	–	4	–	0
Carnegie Tech		–		4	–	5	–	0
Washington & Jefferson		–		4	–	5	–	0
Villanova		–		3	–	4	–	2
NYU		–		3	–	4	–	1
Boston University		–		3	–	4	–	0
Colby		–		3	–	4	–	0
Springfield		–		2	–	3	–	3
Manhattan		–		3	–	5	–	1
Harvard		–		3	–	5	–	0
Vermont		–		2	–	4	–	2
Wesleyan		–		3	–	5	–	0
Brown		–		3	–	6	–	0
Geneva		–		2	–	5	–	2
Saint Joseph's		–		2	–	5	–	1
Cornell		–		2	–	5	–	0
Lafayette		–		2	–	6	–	0
Norwich		–		2	–	6	–	0
Bowdoin		–		0	–	6	–	1
Lowell Textile		–		0	–	7	–	1
Rankings from Associated Press

The 1934 Manhattan Jaspers football team represented Manhattan College as an independent during the 1934 college football season. In their third season under head coach Chick Meehan, the Jasper compiled a 3–5–1 record. In intersectional games, Manhattan tied with Kansas State and lost to Michigan State. The team played all of its games at Ebbets Field in Brooklyn.

=== Schedule ===
Date	Opponent	Site	Result	Attendance	Source
September 22	St. Bonaventure	Ebbets Field; Brooklyn, NY	W 6–0		
September 29	Clarkson Tech	Ebbets Field; Brooklyn, NY	W 19–7	5,000	
October 6	Kansas State	Ebbets Field; Brooklyn, NY	T 13–13	5,000	
October 13	Georgetown	Ebbets Field; Brooklyn, NY	L 0–9	15,000	
October 20	Michigan State	Ebbets Field; Brooklyn, NY	L 0–39	18,000	
October 27	Catholic University	Ebbets Field; Brooklyn, NY	L 0–31	7,500	
November 3	CCNY	Ebbets Field; Brooklyn, NY	W 21–0	15,000	
November 10	Holy Cross	Ebbets Field; Brooklyn, NY	L 6–12	15,000	
November 17	Villanova	Ebbets Field; Brooklyn, NY	L 0–39	15,000	

== 1935 ==
1935 Manhattan Jaspers football
- Conference: Independent
- Record: 5–3–1
- Head coach: Chick Meehan (4th season)
- Home stadium: Ebbets Field

1935 Eastern college football independents records
	Conf.			Overall
Team	W	L	T	W		L		T
No. 3 Princeton		–		9	–	0	–	0
No. 14 Holy Cross		–		9	–	0	–	1
NYU		–		7	–	1	–	0
Dartmouth		–		8	–	2	–	0
Northeastern		–		5	–	0	–	3
Syracuse		–		6	–	1	–	1
No. 10 Pittsburgh		–		7	–	1	–	2
No. 11 Fordham		–		6	–	1	–	2
Villanova		–		7	–	2	–	0
Franklin & Marshall		–		7	–	2	–	1
Providence		–		6	–	2	–	0
No. 18 Army		–		6	–	2	–	1
Colgate		–		7	–	3	–	0
Temple		–		7	–	3	–	0
Boston College		–		6	–	3	–	0
Bucknell		–		6	–	3	–	0
Duquesne		–		6	–	3	–	0
Yale		–		6	–	3	–	0
CCNY		–		4	–	3	–	0
Manhattan		–		5	–	3	–	1
Massachusetts State		–		5	–	4	–	0
La Salle		–		4	–	4	–	1
Penn		–		4	–	4	–	0
Penn State		–		4	–	4	–	0
Columbia		–		4	–	4	–	1
Vermont		–		4	–	5	–	0
Boston University		–		3	–	4	–	2
Harvard		–		3	–	5	–	0
Carnegie Tech		–		2	–	5	–	1
Buffalo		–		2	–	6	–	0
Tufts		–		1	–	5	–	2
Brown		–		1	–	8	–	0
Cornell		–		0	–	6	–	1
Rankings from United Press

The 1935 Manhattan Jaspers football team represented Manhattan College as an independent during the 1935 college football season. In their fourth season under head coach Chick Meehan, the Jaspers compiled a 5–3–1 record and outscored opponents by a total of 248 to 117. The team's starting backfield consisted of Jim Downey, John Zuck, Jim Whalen, and Red Welch.

=== Schedule ===
Date	Opponent	Site	Result	Attendance	Source
September 21	Niagara	Ebbets Field; Brooklyn, NY	W 25–6	12,000	
September 27	St. Bonaventure	Ebbets Field; Brooklyn, NY	W 32–13		
October 5	Brooklyn	Ebbets Field; Brooklyn, NY	W 59–7	6,000	
October 12	LSU	Ebbets Field; Brooklyn, NY	L 0–32	20,000	
October 19	Holy Cross	Ebbets Field; Brooklyn, NY	T 13–13	15,000	
October 26	NC State	Ebbets Field; Brooklyn, NY	L 0–20	17,000	
November 2	CCNY	Ebbets Field; Brooklyn, NY	W 65–0		
November 9	La Salle	Ebbets Field; Brooklyn, NY	W 54–13	7,500	
November 16	Georgetown	Ebbets Field; Brooklyn, NY	L 0–13	10,000	

== 1936 ==
1936 Manhattan Jaspers football
- Conference: Independent
- Record: 6–4
- Head coach: Chick Meehan (5th season)
- Home stadium: Ebbets Field, Randall's Island Stadium

1936 Eastern college football independents records
	Conf.			Overall
Team	W	L	T	W		L		T
Middlebury		–		8	–	0	–	0
Saint Anselm		–		6	–	0	–	1
No. 3 Pittsburgh		–		8	–	1	–	1
No. 10 Penn		–		7	–	1	–	0
No. 12 Yale		–		7	–	1	–	0
No. 13 Dartmouth		–		7	–	1	–	1
Franklin & Marshall		–		7	–	1	–	1
No. 14 Duquesne		–		8	–	2	–	0
Boston College		–		6	–	1	–	2
Boston University		–		5	–	1	–	2
No. 15 Fordham		–		5	–	1	–	2
Holy Cross		–		7	–	2	–	1
Villanova		–		7	–	2	–	1
Army		–		6	–	3	–	0
Colgate		–		6	–	3	–	0
Drexel		–		6	–	3	–	0
Temple		–		6	–	3	–	2
La Salle		–		6	–	3	–	1
Buffalo		–		5	–	3	–	0
Columbia		–		5	–	3	–	0
Princeton		–		4	–	2	–	2
Saint Vincent		–		5	–	3	–	0
NYU		–		5	–	3	–	1
Manhattan		–		6	–	4	–	0
Northeastern		–		5	–	4	–	0
Bucknell		–		4	–	4	–	1
CCNY		–		4	–	4	–	0
Tufts		–		3	–	3	–	1
Harvard		–		3	–	4	–	1
Cornell		–		3	–	5	–	0
Penn State		–		3	–	5	–	0
Westminster (PA)		–		2	–	4	–	1
Brown		–		3	–	7	–	0
Carnegie Tech		–		2	–	6	–	0
Massachusetts State		–		2	–	6	–	0
Providence		–		1	–	7	–	0
Syracuse		–		1	–	7	–	0
Vermont		–		1	–	8	–	0
Rankings from AP Poll

The 1936 Manhattan Jaspers football team represented Manhattan College as an independent during the 1936 college football season. In their fifth season under head coach Chick Meehan, the Jaspers compiled a 6–4 record and outscored opponents by a total of 145 to 92.

=== Schedule ===
Date	Opponent	Site	Result	Attendance	Source
September 26	St. Bonaventure	Randall's Island Stadium; New York, NY	W 32–7	10,000	
October 2	Niagara	Ebbets Field; Brooklyn, NY	W 33–7		
October 9	NC State	Ebbets Field; Brooklyn, NY	W 13–6	20,000	
October 17	at Holy Cross	Fitton Field; Worcester, MA	L 7–13	10,000	
October 24	Detroit	Ebbets Field; Brooklyn, NY	L 0–20	15,000	
October 31	vs. CCNY	Ebbets Field; Brooklyn, NY	W 28–7	6,000	
November 7	Kentucky	Ebbets Field; Brooklyn, NY	W 13–7		
November 14	Georgetown	Ebbets Field; Brooklyn, NY	W 13–0		
November 21	Villanova	Ebbets Field; Brooklyn, NY	L 0–12		
December 5	vs. Texas A&M	Lion Stadium; Tyler, TX	L 6–13	6,000	

== 1937 ==
1937 Manhattan Jaspers football
- Conference: Independent
- Record: 6–3–1
- Head coach: Chick Meehan (6th season)
- Home stadium: Ebbets Field, Polo Grounds

1937 Eastern college football independents records
	Conf.			Overall
Team	W	L	T	W		L		T
No. 1 Pittsburgh		–		9	–	0	–	1
No. 6 Villanova		–		8	–	0	–	1
No. 3 Fordham		–		7	–	0	–	1
No. 7 Dartmouth		–		7	–	0	–	2
No. T–14 Holy Cross		–		8	–	0	–	2
St. Thomas (PA)		–		6	–	1	–	1
No. 12 Yale		–		6	–	1	–	1
Army		–		7	–	2	–	0
Boston University		–		6	–	2	–	0
Cornell		–		5	–	2	–	1
Harvard		–		5	–	2	–	1
Syracuse		–		5	–	2	–	1
CCNY		–		5	–	2	–	0
No. 12 Manhattan		–		6	–	3	–	1
Penn State		–		5	–	3	–	0
Duquesne		–		6	–	4	–	0
Brown		–		5	–	4	–	0
NYU		–		5	–	4	–	0
Temple		–		3	–	2	–	4
Boston College		–		4	–	4	–	1
Bucknell		–		3	–	3	–	2
Buffalo		–		4	–	4	–	0
Princeton		–		4	–	4	–	0
Tufts		–		3	–	4	–	1
Colgate		–		3	–	5	–	0
Columbia		–		2	–	5	–	2
Hofstra		–		2	–	4	–	0
Carnegie Tech		–		2	–	5	–	1
Penn		–		2	–	5	–	1
Providence		–		2	–	6	–	0
Vermont		–		2	–	6	–	0
La Salle		–		2	–	7	–	0
Massachusetts State		–		1	–	7	–	1
Rankings from AP Poll

The 1937 Manhattan Jaspers football team represented Manhattan College as an independent during the 1937 college football season. In their sixth and final season under head coach Chick Meehan, the Jaspers compiled a 6–3–1 record and outscored opponents by a total of 86 to 84.

=== Schedule ===
Date	Opponent	Site	Result	Attendance	Source
September 25	St. Bonaventure	Ebbets Field; Brooklyn, NY	W 21–12	10,000	
October 2	Texas A&M	Polo Grounds; New York, NY	L 7–14	20,000	
October 9	Michigan State	Ebbets Field; Brooklyn, NY	W 3–0	8,000	
October 16	Villanova	Ebbets Field; Brooklyn, NY	L 0–20	18,000	
October 23	at Kentucky	McLean Stadium; Lexington, KY	L 0–19	8,000	
October 30	at Georgetown	Washington, DC	W 20–12		
November 6	Detroit	Ebbets Field; Brooklyn, NY	W 7–0	12,000	
November 13	NC State	Ebbets Field; Brooklyn, NY	W 15–0	3,500	
November 20	Niagara	Ebbets Field; Brooklyn, NY	W 13–7		
December 4	at No. 20 Tulsa	Skelly Field; Tulsa, OK	T 0–0	10,000	
Rankings from AP Poll released prior to the game

== 1938 ==
1938 Manhattan Jaspers football
- Conference: Independent
- Record: 5–4
- Head coach: Herb Kopf (1st season)
- Home stadium: Yankee Stadium, Ebbets Field, Polo Grounds

1938 Eastern college football independents records
	Conf.			Overall
Team	W	L	T	W		L		T
Worcester Tech		–		6	–	0	–	0
No. 18 Villanova		–		8	–	0	–	1
No. 9 Holy Cross		–		8	–	1	–	0
Boston College		–		6	–	1	–	2
No. 15 Fordham		–		6	–	1	–	2
No. 12 Cornell		–		5	–	1	–	1
Army		–		8	–	2	–	0
No. 8 Pittsburgh		–		8	–	2	–	0
No. 6 Carnegie Tech		–		7	–	2	–	0
No. 20 Dartmouth		–		7	–	2	–	0
Vermont		–		4	–	2	–	1
Brown		–		5	–	3	–	0
Bucknell		–		5	–	3	–	0
Syracuse		–		5	–	3	–	0
CCNY		–		4	–	3	–	0
Penn		–		3	–	2	–	3
Manhattan		–		5	–	4	–	0
Harvard		–		4	–	4	–	0
La Salle		–		4	–	4	–	0
NYU		–		4	–	4	–	0
Boston University		–		3	–	4	–	1
Penn State		–		3	–	4	–	1
Princeton		–		3	–	4	–	1
Hofstra		–		2	–	3	–	1
Duquesne		–		4	–	6	–	0
Temple		–		3	–	6	–	1
Providence		–		3	–	5	–	0
Columbia		–		3	–	6	–	0
Massachusetts State		–		3	–	6	–	0
Colgate		–		2	–	5	–	0
Buffalo		–		2	–	6	–	0
Yale		–		2	–	6	–	0
Tufts		–		1	–	6	–	1
Rankings from AP Poll

The 1938 Manhattan Jaspers football team represented Manhattan College as an independent during the 1938 college football season. In their first season under head coach Herb Kopf, the Jaspers compiled a 5–4 record and outscored opponents by a total of 93 to 70.

=== Schedule ===
Date	Opponent	Site	Result	Attendance	Source
September 24	St. Bonaventure	Ebbets Field; Brooklyn, NY	L 6–7		
September 30	Niagara	Polo Grounds; New York, NY	W 19–0		
October 8	at Holy Cross	Fitton Field; Worcester, MA	L 6–19		
October 15	at Providence	LaSalle Field; Providence, RI	W 20–7	3,000	
October 22	Georgetown	Yankee Stadium; Bronx, NY	L 13–14	15,000	
October 29	at Canisius	Buffalo, NY	W 13–3		
November 5	NC State	Yankee Stadium; Bronx, NY	W 3–0	8,000	
November 19	West Virginia	Yankee Stadium; Bronx, NY	W 13–0	6,000	
November 24	No. 16 Villanova	Polo Grounds; New York, NY	L 0–20		
Rankings from AP Poll released prior to the game

== 1939 ==
1939 Manhattan Jaspers football
- Conference: Independent
- Record: 4–4
- Head coach: Herb Kopf (2nd season)
- Home stadium: Polo Grounds, Randall's Island Stadium

1939 Eastern college football independents records
	Conf.			Overall
Team	W	L	T	W		L		T
No. 4 Cornell		–		8	–	0	–	0
No. 10 Duquesne		–		8	–	0	–	1
Swarthmore		–		6	–	0	–	1
Scranton		–		7	–	0	–	2
Princeton		–		7	–	1	–	0
La Salle		–		6	–	1	–	1
Penn State		–		5	–	1	–	2
No. 11 Boston College		–		9	–	2	–	0
No. 17 Fordham		–		6	–	2	–	0
Villanova		–		6	–	2	–	0
Boston University		–		5	–	3	–	0
Brown		–		5	–	3	–	1
Dartmouth		–		5	–	3	–	1
Hofstra		–		4	–	3	–	0
NYU		–		5	–	4	–	0
Pittsburgh		–		5	–	4	–	0
Harvard		–		4	–	4	–	0
Manhattan		–		4	–	4	–	0
Penn		–		4	–	4	–	0
Syracuse		–		3	–	3	–	2
Vermont		–		3	–	3	–	2
Tufts		–		3	–	4	–	1
Yale		–		3	–	4	–	1
Army		–		3	–	4	–	2
Bucknell		–		3	–	5	–	0
Carnegie Tech		–		3	–	5	–	0
Providence		–		3	–	5	–	0
Columbia		–		2	–	4	–	2
Massachusetts State		–		2	–	5	–	2
Colgate		–		2	–	5	–	1
Temple		–		2	–	7	–	0
CCNY		–		1	–	7	–	0
Buffalo		–		0	–	7	–	0
Rankings from AP Poll

The 1939 Manhattan Jaspers football team represented Manhattan College as an independent during the 1939 college football season. In their second season under head coach Herb Kopf, the Jaspers compiled a 4–4 record and outscored opponents by a total of 165 to 155.

Manhattan was not ranked in the final AP poll, but it was ranked at No. 45 in the 1939 Williamson System ratings. and at No. 83 in the final Litkenhous Ratings for 1939.

=== Schedule ===
Date	Opponent	Site	Result	Attendance	Source
September 30	at Holy Cross	Fitton Field; Worcester, MA	L 0–28	20,000	
October 7	St. Bonaventure	Randall's Island Stadium; New York, NY	W 6–0	7,000	
October 14	Duquesne	Polo Grounds; New York, NY	L 0–7		
October 21	Auburn	Polo Grounds; New York, NY	W 7–0	7,500–8,000	
November 4	at Boston University	Braves Field; Boston, MA	W 26–0	5,000	
November 11	at West Virginia	Mountaineer Field; Morgantown, WV	W 19–7	10,000	
November 18	at Detroit	University of Detroit Stadium; Detroit, MI	L 13–36		
November 25	Villanova	Polo Grounds; New York, NY	L 0–7	9,951	
