= 1936 Penn Quakers football team =

American college football season

1936 Penn Quakers football
- Conference: Independent

Ranking
- AP: No. 10
- Record: 7–1
- Head coach: Harvey Harman (6th season)
- Captain: Lew Elverson
- Home stadium: Franklin Field

1936 Eastern college football independents records
	Conf.			Overall
Team	W	L	T	W		L		T
Middlebury		–		8	–	0	–	0
Saint Anselm		–		6	–	0	–	1
No. 3 Pittsburgh		–		8	–	1	–	1
No. 10 Penn		–		7	–	1	–	0
No. 12 Yale		–		7	–	1	–	0
No. 13 Dartmouth		–		7	–	1	–	1
Franklin & Marshall		–		7	–	1	–	1
No. 14 Duquesne		–		8	–	2	–	0
Boston College		–		6	–	1	–	2
Boston University		–		5	–	1	–	2
No. 15 Fordham		–		5	–	1	–	2
Holy Cross		–		7	–	2	–	1
Villanova		–		7	–	2	–	1
Army		–		6	–	3	–	0
Colgate		–		6	–	3	–	0
Drexel		–		6	–	3	–	0
Temple		–		6	–	3	–	2
La Salle		–		6	–	3	–	1
Buffalo		–		5	–	3	–	0
Columbia		–		5	–	3	–	0
Princeton		–		4	–	2	–	2
Saint Vincent		–		5	–	3	–	0
NYU		–		5	–	3	–	1
Manhattan		–		6	–	4	–	0
Northeastern		–		5	–	4	–	0
Bucknell		–		4	–	4	–	1
CCNY		–		4	–	4	–	0
Tufts		–		3	–	3	–	1
Harvard		–		3	–	4	–	1
Cornell		–		3	–	5	–	0
Penn State		–		3	–	5	–	0
Westminster (PA)		–		2	–	4	–	1
Brown		–		3	–	7	–	0
Carnegie Tech		–		2	–	6	–	0
Massachusetts State		–		2	–	6	–	0
Providence		–		1	–	7	–	0
Syracuse		–		1	–	7	–	0
Vermont		–		1	–	8	–	0
Rankings from AP Poll

The 1936 Penn Quakers football team was an American football team that represented the University of Pennsylvania as an independent during the 1936 college football season. In its sixth season under head coach Harvey Harman, the team compiled a 7–1 record, was ranked No. 10 in the final AP Poll, and outscored opponents by a total of 166 to 44. The team played its home games at Franklin Field in Philadelphia.

== Schedule ==
Date	Opponent	Rank	Site	Result	Attendance	Source
October 3	Lafayette		Franklin Field; Philadelphia, PA	W 35–0		
October 10	at Yale		Yale Bowl; New Haven, CT	L 0–7		
October 17	Princeton		Franklin Field; Philadelphia, PA (rivalry)	W 7–0	60,000	
October 24	Brown		Franklin Field; Philadelphia, PA	W 48–6		
October 31	Navy	No. 20	Franklin Field; Philadelphia, PA	W 16–6		
November 7	Michigan	No. 15	Franklin Field; Philadelphia, PA	W 27–7	30,501	
November 14	Penn State	No. 11	Franklin Field; Philadelphia, PA	W 19–12	40,000	
November 26	Cornell	No. 13	Franklin Field; Philadelphia, PA (rivalry)	W 14–6		
Rankings from AP Poll released prior to the game
