= 1936 Boston University Terriers football team =

American college football season

1936 Boston University Terriers football
- Conference: Independent
- Record: 5–1–2
- Head coach: Pat Hanley (3rd season)
- Home stadium: Nickerson Field, Fenway Park

1936 Eastern college football independents records
	Conf.			Overall
Team	W	L	T	W		L		T
Middlebury		–		8	–	0	–	0
Saint Anselm		–		6	–	0	–	1
No. 3 Pittsburgh		–		8	–	1	–	1
No. 10 Penn		–		7	–	1	–	0
No. 12 Yale		–		7	–	1	–	0
No. 13 Dartmouth		–		7	–	1	–	1
Franklin & Marshall		–		7	–	1	–	1
No. 14 Duquesne		–		8	–	2	–	0
Boston College		–		6	–	1	–	2
Boston University		–		5	–	1	–	2
No. 15 Fordham		–		5	–	1	–	2
Holy Cross		–		7	–	2	–	1
Villanova		–		7	–	2	–	1
Army		–		6	–	3	–	0
Colgate		–		6	–	3	–	0
Drexel		–		6	–	3	–	0
Temple		–		6	–	3	–	2
La Salle		–		6	–	3	–	1
Buffalo		–		5	–	3	–	0
Columbia		–		5	–	3	–	0
Princeton		–		4	–	2	–	2
Saint Vincent		–		5	–	3	–	0
NYU		–		5	–	3	–	1
Manhattan		–		6	–	4	–	0
Northeastern		–		5	–	4	–	0
Bucknell		–		4	–	4	–	1
CCNY		–		4	–	4	–	0
Tufts		–		3	–	3	–	1
Harvard		–		3	–	4	–	1
Cornell		–		3	–	5	–	0
Penn State		–		3	–	5	–	0
Westminster (PA)		–		2	–	4	–	1
Brown		–		3	–	7	–	0
Carnegie Tech		–		2	–	6	–	0
Massachusetts State		–		2	–	6	–	0
Providence		–		1	–	7	–	0
Syracuse		–		1	–	7	–	0
Vermont		–		1	–	8	–	0
Rankings from AP Poll

The 1936 Boston University Terriers football team was an American football team that represented Boston University as an independent during the 1936 college football season. In its third season under head coach Pat Hanley, the team compiled a 5–1–2 record and outscored opponents by a total of 87 to 39.

== Schedule ==
Date	Opponent	Site	Result	Attendance	Source
October 3	American International	Nickerson Field; Weston, MA	W 40–0		
October 10	at Toledo	Libbey High School; Toledo, OH	W 6–0		
October 17	Washington University	Fenway Park; Boston, MA	W 6–0	2,000	
October 24	at Villanova	Shibe Park; Philadelphia, PA	L 7–25		
October 31	Miami (FL)	Nickerson Field; Weston, MA	T 7–7		
November 7	at Rutgers	Neilson Field; New Brunswick, NJ	W 7–0		
November 14	Clarkson	Nickerson Field; Weston, MA	W 14–7		
November 21	vs. Boston College	Fenway Park; Boston, MA (rivalry)	T 0–0	15,000	
