= 1936 Army Cadets football team =

American college football season

1936 Army Cadets football
- Conference: Independent
- Record: 6–3
- Head coach: Garrison H. Davidson (4th season)
- Captain: Woodrow W. Stromberg
- Home stadium: Michie Stadium

1936 Eastern college football independents records
| | Conf. | | | Overall |
| Team | W | L | T | W | | L | | T |
|---|---|---|---|---|---|---|---|---|
| Middlebury | | – | | 8 | – | 0 | – | 0 |
| Saint Anselm | | – | | 6 | – | 0 | – | 1 |
| No. 3 Pittsburgh | | – | | 8 | – | 1 | – | 1 |
| No. 10 Penn | | – | | 7 | – | 1 | – | 0 |
| No. 12 Yale | | – | | 7 | – | 1 | – | 0 |
| No. 13 Dartmouth | | – | | 7 | – | 1 | – | 1 |
| Franklin & Marshall | | – | | 7 | – | 1 | – | 1 |
| No. 14 Duquesne | | – | | 8 | – | 2 | – | 0 |
| Boston College | | – | | 6 | – | 1 | – | 2 |
| Boston University | | – | | 5 | – | 1 | – | 2 |
| No. 15 Fordham | | – | | 5 | – | 1 | – | 2 |
| Holy Cross | | – | | 7 | – | 2 | – | 1 |
| Villanova | | – | | 7 | – | 2 | – | 1 |
| Army | | – | | 6 | – | 3 | – | 0 |
| Colgate | | – | | 6 | – | 3 | – | 0 |
| Drexel | | – | | 6 | – | 3 | – | 0 |
| Temple | | – | | 6 | – | 3 | – | 2 |
| La Salle | | – | | 6 | – | 3 | – | 1 |
| Buffalo | | – | | 5 | – | 3 | – | 0 |
| Columbia | | – | | 5 | – | 3 | – | 0 |
| Princeton | | – | | 4 | – | 2 | – | 2 |
| Saint Vincent | | – | | 5 | – | 3 | – | 0 |
| NYU | | – | | 5 | – | 3 | – | 1 |
| Manhattan | | – | | 6 | – | 4 | – | 0 |
| Northeastern | | – | | 5 | – | 4 | – | 0 |
| Bucknell | | – | | 4 | – | 4 | – | 1 |
| CCNY | | – | | 4 | – | 4 | – | 0 |
| Tufts | | – | | 3 | – | 3 | – | 1 |
| Harvard | | – | | 3 | – | 4 | – | 1 |
| Cornell | | – | | 3 | – | 5 | – | 0 |
| Penn State | | – | | 3 | – | 5 | – | 0 |
| Westminster (PA) | | – | | 2 | – | 4 | – | 1 |
| Brown | | – | | 3 | – | 7 | – | 0 |
| Carnegie Tech | | – | | 2 | – | 6 | – | 0 |
| Massachusetts State | | – | | 2 | – | 6 | – | 0 |
| Providence | | – | | 1 | – | 7 | – | 0 |
| Syracuse | | – | | 1 | – | 7 | – | 0 |
| Vermont | | – | | 1 | – | 8 | – | 0 |
Rankings from AP Poll

The 1936 Army Cadets football team represented the United States Military Academy as an independent during the 1936 college football season. In their fourth year under head coach Garrison H. Davidson, the Cadets compiled a 6–3 record and outscored their opponents by a combined total of 238 to 71. In the annual Army–Navy Game, the Cadets lost to the Midshipmen by a 7 to 0 score. The Cadets' other two losses came against Colgate and Notre Dame.

No Army players were recognized on the 1936 College Football All-America Team.

== Schedule ==
| Date | Opponent | Rank | Site | Result | Attendance | Source |
|---|---|---|---|---|---|---|
| October 3 | Washington & Lee | | Michie Stadium; West Point, NY | W 28–0 | 12,000 | |
| October 10 | at Columbia | | Yankee Stadium; Bronx, NY | W 27–16 | 38,000 | |
| October 17 | at Harvard | | Harvard Stadium; Boston, MA | W 32–0 | 20,000 | |
| October 24 | Springfield | No. 3 | Michie Stadium; West Point, NY | W 33–0 | | |
| October 31 | Colgate | No. 6 | Michie Stadium; West Point, NY | L 7–14 | | |
| November 7 | Muhlenberg | | Michie Stadium; West Point, NY | W 54–7 | | |
| November 14 | vs. Notre Dame | | Yankee Stadium; Bronx, NY (rivalry) | L 6–20 | 74,423 | |
| November 21 | Hobart | | Michie Stadium; West Point, NY | W 51–7 | | |
| November 28 | vs. Navy | | Philadelphia Municipal Stadium; Philadelphia, PA (Army–Navy Game) | L 0–7 | | |
Rankings from AP Poll released prior to the game
