= 1936 Holy Cross Crusaders football team =

American college football season

1936 Holy Cross Crusaders football
- Conference: Independent
- Record: 7–2–1
- Head coach: Eddie Anderson (4th season)
- Home stadium: Fitton Field

1936 Eastern college football independents records
	Conf.			Overall
Team	W	L	T	W		L		T
Middlebury		–		8	–	0	–	0
Saint Anselm		–		6	–	0	–	1
No. 3 Pittsburgh		–		8	–	1	–	1
No. 10 Penn		–		7	–	1	–	0
No. 12 Yale		–		7	–	1	–	0
No. 13 Dartmouth		–		7	–	1	–	1
Franklin & Marshall		–		7	–	1	–	1
No. 14 Duquesne		–		8	–	2	–	0
Boston College		–		6	–	1	–	2
Boston University		–		5	–	1	–	2
No. 15 Fordham		–		5	–	1	–	2
Holy Cross		–		7	–	2	–	1
Villanova		–		7	–	2	–	1
Army		–		6	–	3	–	0
Colgate		–		6	–	3	–	0
Drexel		–		6	–	3	–	0
Temple		–		6	–	3	–	2
La Salle		–		6	–	3	–	1
Buffalo		–		5	–	3	–	0
Columbia		–		5	–	3	–	0
Princeton		–		4	–	2	–	2
Saint Vincent		–		5	–	3	–	0
NYU		–		5	–	3	–	1
Manhattan		–		6	–	4	–	0
Northeastern		–		5	–	4	–	0
Bucknell		–		4	–	4	–	1
CCNY		–		4	–	4	–	0
Tufts		–		3	–	3	–	1
Harvard		–		3	–	4	–	1
Cornell		–		3	–	5	–	0
Penn State		–		3	–	5	–	0
Westminster (PA)		–		2	–	4	–	1
Brown		–		3	–	7	–	0
Carnegie Tech		–		2	–	6	–	0
Massachusetts State		–		2	–	6	–	0
Providence		–		1	–	7	–	0
Syracuse		–		1	–	7	–	0
Vermont		–		1	–	8	–	0
Rankings from AP Poll

The 1936 Holy Cross Crusaders football team represented the College of the Holy Cross during the 1936 college football season. The Crusaders were led by fourth-year head coach Eddie Anderson and played their home games at Fitton Field on campus in Worcester, Massachusetts. The team competed as a football independent. Holy Cross started the year on a five game winning streak, which helped land them a spot in the first ever AP Poll, released on October 19, 1936, being ranked 17th in that poll. Losses to Temple and rival Boston College and a tie to Saint Anselm knocked the Crusaders out of the polls by the end of the year. The team finished with an overall record of 7–2–1.

== Schedule ==
Date	Opponent	Rank	Site	Result	Attendance	Source
September 26	Bates		Fitton Field; Worcester, MA	W 45–0		
October 3	Providence		Fitton Field; Worcester, MA	W 21–6	10,000	
October 10	at Dartmouth		Memorial Field; Hanover, NH	W 7–0		
October 17	Manhattan		Fitton Field; Worcester, MA	W 13–7	10,000	
October 24	Carnegie Tech	No. 17	Fitton Field; Worcester, MA	W 7–0		
October 31	at Temple	No. 13	Temple Stadium; Philadelphia, PA	L 0–3		
November 7	Colgate		Fitton Field; Worcester, MA	W 20–13		
November 14	at Brown	No. 17	Brown Stadium; Providence, RI	W 32–0		
November 21	Saint Anselm	No. 17	Fitton Field; Worcester, MA	T 0–0		
November 28	at Boston College		Fenway Park; Boston, MA (rivalry)	L 12–13	28,000	
Rankings from AP Poll released prior to the game

== Rankings ==
Ranking movements Legend: ██ Increase in ranking ██ Decrease in ranking — = Not ranked т = Tied with team above or below
	Week						
Poll	1	2	3	4	5	6	Final
AP	17	13T	—	17	17	—	—
