= 1936 Villanova Wildcats football team =

American college football season

1936 Villanova Wildcats football

Bacardi Bowl, T 7–7 vs. Auburn
- Conference: Independent
- Record: 7–2–1
- Head coach: Clipper Smith (1st season)
- Home stadium: Shibe Park, Villanova Stadium

1936 Eastern college football independents records
	Conf.			Overall
Team	W	L	T	W		L		T
Middlebury		–		8	–	0	–	0
Saint Anselm		–		6	–	0	–	1
No. 3 Pittsburgh		–		8	–	1	–	1
No. 10 Penn		–		7	–	1	–	0
No. 12 Yale		–		7	–	1	–	0
No. 13 Dartmouth		–		7	–	1	–	1
Franklin & Marshall		–		7	–	1	–	1
No. 14 Duquesne		–		8	–	2	–	0
Boston College		–		6	–	1	–	2
Boston University		–		5	–	1	–	2
No. 15 Fordham		–		5	–	1	–	2
Holy Cross		–		7	–	2	–	1
Villanova		–		7	–	2	–	1
Army		–		6	–	3	–	0
Colgate		–		6	–	3	–	0
Drexel		–		6	–	3	–	0
Temple		–		6	–	3	–	2
La Salle		–		6	–	3	–	1
Buffalo		–		5	–	3	–	0
Columbia		–		5	–	3	–	0
Princeton		–		4	–	2	–	2
Saint Vincent		–		5	–	3	–	0
NYU		–		5	–	3	–	1
Manhattan		–		6	–	4	–	0
Northeastern		–		5	–	4	–	0
Bucknell		–		4	–	4	–	1
CCNY		–		4	–	4	–	0
Tufts		–		3	–	3	–	1
Harvard		–		3	–	4	–	1
Cornell		–		3	–	5	–	0
Penn State		–		3	–	5	–	0
Westminster (PA)		–		2	–	4	–	1
Brown		–		3	–	7	–	0
Carnegie Tech		–		2	–	6	–	0
Massachusetts State		–		2	–	6	–	0
Providence		–		1	–	7	–	0
Syracuse		–		1	–	7	–	0
Vermont		–		1	–	8	–	0
Rankings from AP Poll

The 1936 Villanova Wildcats football team represented Villanova University as an independent during the 1936 college football season. Led by first-year head coach Clipper Smith, the Wildcats compiled a record of 7–2–1.

== Schedule ==
Date	Opponent	Site	Result	Attendance	Source
September 26	Pennsylvania Military	Villanova Stadium; Villanova, PA	W 32–6		
October 3	Detroit	Shibe Park; PhiladelphiaA	W 13–6	18,000	
October 10	at Penn State	New Beaver Field; State College, PA	W 13–0	9,593	
October 17	Western Maryland	Shibe Park; Philadelphia, PA	W 13–0		
October 24	Boston University	Shibe Park; Philadelphia, PA	W 25–7		
October 31	at Bucknell	Memorial Stadium; Lewisburg, PA	L 0–6	12,000	
November 7	at South Carolina	Columbia Municipal Stadium; Columbia, SC	W 14–0	4,000	
November 14	at No. 19 Temple	Temple Stadium; Philadelphia, PA	L 0–6		
November 21	at Manhattan	Ebbets Field; Brooklyn, NY	W 12–0		
January 1, 1937	vs. Auburn	La Tropical Stadium; Havana, Cuba (Bacardi Bowl)	T 7–7	6,000	
Rankings from AP Poll released prior to the game
