= 1936 La Salle Explorers football team =

American college football season

1936 La Salle Explorers football
- Conference: Independent
- Record: 6–3–1
- Head coach: Marty Brill (4th season)
- Home stadium: Philadelphia Ball Park; McCarthy Stadium

1936 Eastern college football independents records
	Conf.			Overall
Team	W	L	T	W		L		T
Middlebury		–		8	–	0	–	0
Saint Anselm		–		6	–	0	–	1
No. 3 Pittsburgh		–		8	–	1	–	1
No. 10 Penn		–		7	–	1	–	0
No. 12 Yale		–		7	–	1	–	0
No. 13 Dartmouth		–		7	–	1	–	1
Franklin & Marshall		–		7	–	1	–	1
No. 14 Duquesne		–		8	–	2	–	0
Boston College		–		6	–	1	–	2
Boston University		–		5	–	1	–	2
No. 15 Fordham		–		5	–	1	–	2
Holy Cross		–		7	–	2	–	1
Villanova		–		7	–	2	–	1
Army		–		6	–	3	–	0
Colgate		–		6	–	3	–	0
Drexel		–		6	–	3	–	0
Temple		–		6	–	3	–	2
La Salle		–		6	–	3	–	1
Buffalo		–		5	–	3	–	0
Columbia		–		5	–	3	–	0
Princeton		–		4	–	2	–	2
Saint Vincent		–		5	–	3	–	0
NYU		–		5	–	3	–	1
Manhattan		–		6	–	4	–	0
Northeastern		–		5	–	4	–	0
Bucknell		–		4	–	4	–	1
CCNY		–		4	–	4	–	0
Tufts		–		3	–	3	–	1
Harvard		–		3	–	4	–	1
Cornell		–		3	–	5	–	0
Penn State		–		3	–	5	–	0
Westminster (PA)		–		2	–	4	–	1
Brown		–		3	–	7	–	0
Carnegie Tech		–		2	–	6	–	0
Massachusetts State		–		2	–	6	–	0
Providence		–		1	–	7	–	0
Syracuse		–		1	–	7	–	0
Vermont		–		1	–	8	–	0
Rankings from AP Poll

The 1936 La Salle Explorers football team was an American football team that represented La Salle College (now known as La Salle University) as an independent during the 1936 college football season. In their fourth year under head coach Marty Brill, the Explorers compiled a 6–3–1 record.

== Schedule ==
Date	Opponent	Site	Result	Attendance	Source
September 20	at Niagara	Varsity Stadium; Lewiston, NY	W 27–6		
October 4	at Canisius	Buffalo, NY	W 19–14		
October 10	at Catholic University	Brookland Stadium; Washington, DC	L 10–14		
October 16	Elon	Philadelphia Ball Park; Philadelphia, PA	W 36–12		
October 24	at Mount St. Mary's	Frederick, MD	W 13–6	2,500	
November 1	Saint Mary's (MN)	McCarthy Stadium; Philadelphia, PA	W 47–12	6,000	
November 7	West Chester	McCarthy Stadium; Philadelphia, PA	W 19–14	5,000	
November 15	St. Bonaventure	McCarthy Stadium; Philadelphia, PA	L 7–14	5,000	
November 22	at Saint Joseph's	Philadelphia Ball Park; Philadelphia, PA	L 0–7	10,000	
November 26	at St. Thomas (PA)	Athletic Park; Scranton, PA	T 0–0	6,500	
