= 1936 Syracuse Orangemen football team =

American college football season

1936 Syracuse Orangemen football
- Conference: Independent
- Record: 1–7
- Head coach: Vic Hanson (7th season)
- Captain: Vannie Albanese
- Home stadium: Archbold Stadium

1936 Eastern college football independents records
	Conf.			Overall
Team	W	L	T	W		L		T
Middlebury		–		8	–	0	–	0
Saint Anselm		–		6	–	0	–	1
No. 3 Pittsburgh		–		8	–	1	–	1
No. 10 Penn		–		7	–	1	–	0
No. 12 Yale		–		7	–	1	–	0
No. 13 Dartmouth		–		7	–	1	–	1
Franklin & Marshall		–		7	–	1	–	1
No. 14 Duquesne		–		8	–	2	–	0
Boston College		–		6	–	1	–	2
Boston University		–		5	–	1	–	2
No. 15 Fordham		–		5	–	1	–	2
Holy Cross		–		7	–	2	–	1
Villanova		–		7	–	2	–	1
Army		–		6	–	3	–	0
Colgate		–		6	–	3	–	0
Drexel		–		6	–	3	–	0
Temple		–		6	–	3	–	2
La Salle		–		6	–	3	–	1
Buffalo		–		5	–	3	–	0
Columbia		–		5	–	3	–	0
Princeton		–		4	–	2	–	2
Saint Vincent		–		5	–	3	–	0
NYU		–		5	–	3	–	1
Manhattan		–		6	–	4	–	0
Northeastern		–		5	–	4	–	0
Bucknell		–		4	–	4	–	1
CCNY		–		4	–	4	–	0
Tufts		–		3	–	3	–	1
Harvard		–		3	–	4	–	1
Cornell		–		3	–	5	–	0
Penn State		–		3	–	5	–	0
Westminster (PA)		–		2	–	4	–	1
Brown		–		3	–	7	–	0
Carnegie Tech		–		2	–	6	–	0
Massachusetts State		–		2	–	6	–	0
Providence		–		1	–	7	–	0
Syracuse		–		1	–	7	–	0
Vermont		–		1	–	8	–	0
Rankings from AP Poll

The 1936 Syracuse Orangemen football team represented Syracuse University as an independent during the 1936 college football season. The Orangemen were led by seventh-year head coach Vic Hanson and played their home games at Archbold Stadium in Syracuse, New York. After losing the final seven games of the season, Hanson resigned as head coach.

== Schedule ==
Date	Opponent	Site	Result	Attendance	Source
October 3	Clarkson	Archbold Stadium; Syracuse, NY	W 31–0	7,500	
October 10	Baldwin–Wallace	Archbold Stadium; Syracuse, NY	L 0–19	12,000	
October 17	at Cornell	Schoellkopf Field; Ithaca, NY	L 7–20	15,000	
October 24	Maryland	Archbold Stadium; Syracuse, NY	L 0–20	16,000–20,000	
October 31	at Penn State	New Beaver Field; University Park, PA (rivalry)	L 0–18	10,000	
November 7	at Indiana	Memorial Stadium; Bloomington, IN	L 7–9	10,000	
November 14	at Columbia	Baker Field; New York, NY	L 0–17	20,000	
November 21	Colgate	Archbold Stadium; Syracuse, NY (rivalry)	L 0–13	20,000	
