= 1936 college football rankings =

- Season: 1936
- Bowl season: 1936–37 bowl games
- End of season champions: Minnesota (Note: per AP poll, Dunkel System, Dickinson System, Litkenhous Ratings, Poling System, Toledo Cup, Billingsley Report, Helms Athletic Foundation, National Championship Foundation); Pittsburgh (Note: per Boand System, Houlgate System, and College Football Researchers Association); LSU (Note: per Williamson System, Sagarin Ratings Elo chess method, and Sagarin Ratings Predictor method) (not claimed); Duke (Note: per Berryman QPRS) (not claimed)

The college football rankings for the 1936 college football season included the first AP Poll, the Toledo Cup rankings based on input from a judge's committee of 250 sports editors, and the Litkenhous Ratings. The 1936 Minnesota Golden Gophers football team was ranked as the national champion in all three rankings.

== Champions (by ranking) ==
Major rankings (both contemporary and retroactive) have varyingly identified either Minnesota, Pittsburgh, LSU or Duke as the 1936 national champion.

- AP poll: Minnesota
- Berryman QPRS: Duke
- Billingsley Report: Minnesota
- Boand System: Pittsburgh
- College Football Researchers Association: Pittsburgh
- Dickinson System: Minnesota
- Dunkel System: Minnesota
- Helms Athletic Foundation: Minnesota
- Houlgate System: Pittsburgh
- Litkenhous Ratings: Minnesota
- National Championship Foundation: Minnesota
- Poling System: Minnesota
- Sagarin Ratings Elo chess method: LSU
- Sagarin Ratings Predictor method: LSU
- Toledo Cup: Minnesota
- Williamson System: LSU

Note: AP poll, Boand System, Dickinson System, Dunkel System, Houlgate System, Litkenhous Ratings, Poling System, Toledo Cup, and Williamson System were given contemporarily. All other methods were given retroactively.

== AP Poll ==
=== Legend ===
	Increase in ranking
	Decrease in ranking
	Not ranked previous week
	National champion
(#–#)	Win–loss record
(Italics)	Number of first place votes
т	Tied with team above or below also with this symbol

The final AP Poll was released on November 30, at the end of the 1936 regular season, weeks before the major bowls. The AP would not release a post-bowl season final poll regularly until 1968.

	Week 1 Oct 19	Week 2 Oct 26	Week 3 Nov 2	Week 4 Nov 9	Week 5 Nov 16	Week 6 Nov 23	Week 7 (Final) Nov 30	
1.	Minnesota (3–0) (32)	Minnesota (4–0) (44)	Northwestern (5–0) (31)	Northwestern (6–0) (31)	Northwestern (7–0) (17)	Minnesota (7–1) (30)	Minnesota (7–1) (25)	1.
2.	Duke (5–0) (1)	Pittsburgh (4–1)	Minnesota (4–1) (10)	Minnesota (5–1) (12)	Minnesota (6–1) (12)	LSU (8–0–1) (10)	LSU (9–0–1) (9)	2.
3.	Army (3–0) (1)	Northwestern (4–0)	Fordham (4–0–1) (2)	Fordham (5–0–1) (3)	Fordham (5–0–1) (4)	Alabama (7–0–1)	Pittsburgh (7–1–1)	3.
4.	Northwestern (3–0)	Washington (4–1)	Marquette (5–0)	Alabama (6–0–1) (1)	Pittsburgh (6–1–1)	Pittsburgh (6–1–1)	Alabama (8–0–1)	4.
5.	Purdue (3–0)	Fordham (4–0)	Pittsburgh (4–1–1)	Pittsburgh (5–1–1)	LSU (7–0–1) (2)	Santa Clara (7–0) (1)	Washington (7–1–1)	5.
6.	USC (3–0–1) (1)	Army (4–0)	Washington (5–1)	Nebraska (5–1)	Washington (6–1–1) (2)	Washington (6–1–1)	Santa Clara (7–0) (1)	6.
7.	Notre Dame (3–0)	USC (4–0–1)	LSU (5–0–1)	LSU (6–0–1)	Marquette (7–0)	Northwestern (7–1)	Northwestern (7–1)	7.
8.	Washington (3–1)	LSU (4–0–1)	Nebraska (4–1)	Marquette (6–0)	Alabama (7–0–1)	Fordham (5–0–2)	Notre Dame (6–2)	8.
9.	Pittsburgh (3–1)	Tulane (4–0–1)	Santa Clara (5–0)	Santa Clara (5–0)	Santa Clara (6–0)	Notre Dame (6–2) (1)	Nebraska (7–2)	9.
10.	Yale (3–0)	Marquette (4–0)	Tulane (5–0–1)	Washington (5–1–1)	Penn (6–1)	Nebraska (6–2)	Penn (7–1)	10.
11.	Duquesne (4–0)	Nebraska (3–1)	USC (4–0–1)	Penn (5–1)	Notre Dame (5–2)	Duke (8–1)	Duke (9–1)	11.
12.	St. Mary's (3–0–1)	Yale (4–0)	SMU (4–1)	Dartmouth (6–1)	Dartmouth (7–1)	Duquesne (7–2)	Yale (7–1)	12.
13.	LSU (3–0–1)	Duke (5–1) т	Notre Dame (4–1)	Duke (7–1)	Nebraska (5–2)	Penn (6–1)	Dartmouth (7–1–1)	13.
14.	Texas A&M (4–0)	Holy Cross (5–0) т	Alabama (5–0–1)	Washington State (5–1–1)	Texas A&M (7–1–1)	Dartmouth (7–1–1)	Duquesne (7–2)	14.
15.	Nebraska (2–1)	SMU (3–1)	Duke (6–1) т	Texas A&M (6–1–1) т	Washington State (6–1–1)	Marquette (7–1)	Fordham (5–1–2)	15.
16.	Fordham (3–0)	Auburn (4–0–1)	Penn (4–1) т	USC (4–1–1) т	Duke (8–1)	Yale (7–1)	TCU (7–2–2)	16.
17.	Holy Cross (4–0)	Princeton (3–1) т	Washington State (5–0–1)	Holy Cross (6–1)	Holy Cross (7–1)	Tennessee (5–2–1)	Tennessee (6–2–1)	17.
18.	Tulane (3–0–1)	Purdue (3–1) т	Dartmouth (5–1) т	TCU (5–2–1)	Ohio State (4–3)	TCU (7–2–1)	Arkansas (6–3) т	18.
19.	SMU (3–1)	Santa Clara (4–0)	Tennessee (3–2–1) т	SMU (4–2) т	Tennessee (5–2–1)	Tulane (6–2–1)	Navy (6–3) т	19.
20.	Marquette (3–0)	Penn (3–1) т; St. Mary's (3–1–1) т	Auburn (4–1–1)	Temple (5–1–1) т	Duquesne (6–2) т; Temple (6–1–1) т	Washington State (6–1–1)	Marquette (7–1)	20.
	Week 1 Oct 19	Week 2 Oct 26	Week 3 Nov 2	Week 4 Nov 9	Week 5 Nov 16	Week 6 Nov 23	Week 7 (Final) Nov 30	
		Dropped: Duquesne; Notre Dame; Texas A&M	Dropped: Army; Holy Cross; Princeton; Purdue; St. Mary's; Yale	Dropped: Auburn; Notre Dame; Tennessee; Tulane	Dropped: SMU; TCU; USC	Dropped: Holy Cross; Ohio State; Temple; Texas A&M	Dropped: Tulane; Washington State	

== Boand System rankings ==
The final post-bowl Boand System rankings for 1936 were:

1. Pittsburgh (81.1 pts)
2. Minnesota (79.6 pts)
3. LSU (79.1 pts)
4. Santa Clara (76.8 pts)
5. Northwestern (75.4 pts)
6. Washington University (75.3 pts)
7. Nebraska (75.2 pts)
8. Alabama (75.1 pts)
9. TCU (74.9 pts)
10. Yale (74.1 pts)
11. Notre Dame (73.6 pts)
12. Marquette (72.9 pts)

== Toledo Cup ==
For the third consecutive year, Minnesota won the Toledo Cup as college football's national champion. The Toledo Cup award was based on input from a judge's committee of 250 sports editors of leading newspapers. By winning the cup for the third consecutive years, Minnesota received permanent possession of the cup. The results of preliminary balloting were as follows:

1. Minnesota – 582 points
2. Northwestern – 525 points
3. Fordham – 135 points
4. LSU – 95 points
5. Pittsburgh – 94 points
6. Alabama – 61 points
7. Santa Clara – 60 points
8. Marquette – 38 points
9. Washington – 29 points
10. (tie) Dartmouth – 5 points
10. (tie) Duke – 5 points
12. Penn – 3 points
13. Nebraska – 2 points

The vote tally in the final round was as follows:

1. Minnesota – 230 votes
2. LSU – 7 votes
3. Northwestern – 6 votes
4. Fordham – 2 votes

== Litkenhous Ratings ==
The post-bowl final Litkenhous Ratings for 1936 ranked 618 college football teams. The top 125 teams were as follows:

1. Minnesota
2. Pittsburgh
3. LSU
4. Ohio State
5. Duke
6. Notre Dame
7. Alabama
8. Nebraska
9. Washington
10. Duquesne
11. Mississippi State
12. Army
13. Northwestern
14. Georgia Tech
15. Auburn
16. Tennessee
17. Arkansas
18. Baldwin–Wallace
19. Santa Clara
20. Marquette
21. Dartmouth
22. Purdue
23. Indiana
24. Penn
25. TCU
26. Michigan State
27. Detroit
28. USC
29. Colgate
30. North Carolina
31. Harvard
32. Holy Cross
33. Princeton
34. Hardin–Simmons
35. Temple
36. Yale
37. Ole Miss
38. Carnegie Tech
39. Tulane
40. Villanova
41. Texas A&M
42. Kentucky
43. SMU
44. Navy
45. George Washington
46. California
47. Vanderbilt
48. Manhattan
49. Tulsa
50. Western Reserve
51. Rice
52. Iowa
53. Georgetown
54. Clemson
55. Michigan
56. Illinois
57. UCLA
58. Baylor
59. Georgia
60. West Virginia
61. Washington State
62. Stanford
63. NYU
64. Boston College
65. Missouri
66. Penn State
67. Canisius
68. Wake Forest
69. Kansas State
70. Oregon State
71. Wisconsin
72. Catholic University
73. DePaul
74. Kearney State
75. Texas
76. Saint Anselm
77. Oklahoma
78. Arkansas Tech
79. West Virginia Wesleyan
80. Davidson
81. NC State
82. Arizona
83. Louisiana Tech
84. Connecticut State
85. Saint Mary's
86. Waynesburg
87. Butler
88. Creighton
89. Marshall
90. Miami (FL)
91. Washington University
92. Cornell
93. Humboldt State
94. Maryland
95. Bucknell
96. Centenary
97. Albright
98. Drake
99. Florida
100. La Salle
101. Loyola (Los Angeles)
102. Colorado
103. Syracuse
104. Chattanooga
105. St. Benedict
106. Utah State
107. Franklin & Marshall
108. North Dakota
109. Saint Louis
110. St. Bonaventure
111. Western Maryland
112. South Carolina
113. Texas Tech
114. Utah
115. Gonzaga
116. St. Thomas (PA)
117. Boston University
118. Howard
119. Denver
120. Augustana (SD)
121. Connecticut State
122. Furman
123. Iowa State
124. Hobart
125. Oregon

== See also ==
- 1936 College Football All-America Team
