= 1936 Big Ten Conference football season =

- Sport: Football
- Number of teams: 10
- Top draft pick: Ed Widseth
- Champion: Northwestern
- Runners-up: Minnesota, Ohio State
- Season MVP: Vern Huffman

Football seasons
- ← 1935 1937 →

1936 Big Ten Conference football standings
	Conf.					Overall
Team	W		L		T	W		L		T
No. 7 Northwestern $	6	–	0	–	0	7	–	1	–	0
No. 1 Minnesota	4	–	1	–	0	7	–	1	–	0
Ohio State	4	–	1	–	0	5	–	3	–	0
Indiana	3	–	1	–	1	5	–	2	–	1
Purdue	3	–	1	–	1	5	–	2	–	1
Illinois	2	–	2	–	1	4	–	3	–	1
Chicago	1	–	4	–	0	2	–	5	–	1
Iowa	0	–	4	–	1	3	–	4	–	1
Wisconsin	0	–	4	–	0	2	–	6	–	0
Michigan	0	–	5	–	0	1	–	7	–	0
$ – Conference champion; Rankings from AP Poll

The 1936 Big Ten Conference football season was the 41st season of college football played by the member schools of the Big Ten Conference (also known as the Western Conference) and was a part of the 1936 college football season.

The 1936 Minnesota Golden Gophers football team, under head coach Bernie Bierman, compiled a 7–1 record and was ranked No. 1 in the final AP Poll, giving Minnesota its third consecutive national championship. Tackle Ed Widseth was a consensus first-team All-American and was the first Big Ten player taken in the 1937 NFL draft with the fourth overall pick.

The 1936 Northwestern Wildcats football team, under head coach Pappy Waldorf, compiled a 7–1 record, won the Big Ten championship, and was ranked No. 7 in the final AP Poll. The team's only loss came on the last day of the season against Notre Dame. Guard Steve Reid was a consensus first-team All-American.

The 1936 Ohio State Buckeyes football team, under head coach Francis Schmidt, compiled a 5–3 record, led the Big Ten in scoring defense (3.4 points allowed per game), and outscored opponents 160 to 27. End Merle Wendt, tackle Charley Hamrick, and guard Inwood Smith were first-team All-Big Ten players.

== Season overview ==
=== Results and team statistics ===
Conf. Rank	Team	Head coach	AP final	AP high	Overall record	Conf. record	PPG	PAG	MVP
1	Northwestern	Pappy Waldorf	#7	#1	7–1	6–0	16.5	9.1	Steve Reid
2 (tie)	Minnesota	Bernie Bierman	#1	#1	7-1	4-1	25.4	4.0	Ed Widseth
2 (tie)	Ohio State	Francis Schmidt	NR	#18	5–3	4–1	20.0	3.4	Ralph Wolfe
4 (tie)	Indiana	Bo McMillin	NR	NR	5–2–1	3–1–1	5.4	7.9	Vern Huffman
4 (tie)	Purdue	Noble Kizer	NR	#5	5–2–1	3–1–1	19.6	11.9	John Drake
6	Illinois	Robert Zuppke	NR	NR	4–3–1	2–2–1	7.1	9.5	Cliff Kuhn
7	Chicago	Clark Shaughnessy	NR	NR	2–5–1	1–4	8.5	20.8	Sam Whiteside
8	Iowa	Ossie Solem	NR	NR	3–4–1	0–4–1	10.6	12.9	Homer Harris
9	Wisconsin	Harry Stuhldreher	NR	#16	2–6	0–4	11.9	18.0	Eddie Jankowski
10	Michigan	Harry Kipke	NR	NR	1–7	0–5	4.5	15.9	Matt Patanelli

Key
PPG = Average of points scored per game
PAG = Average of points allowed per game
MVP = Most valuable player as voted by players on each team as part of the voting process to determine the winner of the Chicago Tribune Silver Football trophy

=== Bowl games ===
No Big Ten teams participated in any bowl games during the 1936 season.

== All-Big Ten players ==
The following players were picked by the Associated Press (AP) and/or the United Press (UP) as first-team players on the 1936 All-Big Ten Conference football team.

Position	Name	Team	Selectors
End	Merle Wendt	Ohio State	AP, UP
End	Johnny Kovatch	Northwestern	AP, UP
Tackle	Ed Widseth	Minnesota	AP, UP
Tackle	Charley Hamrick	Ohio State	AP, UP
Guard	Steve Reid	Northwestern	AP, UP
Guard	Inwood Smith	Ohio State	AP
Guard	Lester G. Schreiber	Northwestern	UP
Center	Ed Sayre	Illinois	AP, UP
Quarterback	Fred Vanzo	Northwestern	AP, UP
Halfback	Andy Uram	Minnesota	AP, UP
Halfback	Don Heap	Northwestern	AP
Halfback	Vern Huffman	Indiana	UP
Fullback	Cecil Isbell	Purdue	AP
Fullback	Johnny Drake	Purdue	UP

== All-Americans ==
Two Big Ten players were selected as consensus first-team players on the 1936 College Football All-America Team. They were:

Position	Name	Team	Selectors
Tackle	Ed Widseth	Minnesota	AAB, AP, COL, INS, LIB, NANA, NEA, TSN, UP, CP, WCFF
Guard	Steve Reid	Northwestern	AAB, COL, LIB, NANA, NEA, TSN, WCFF

Other Big Ten players received first-team honors from at least one selector. They were:

Position	Name	Team	Selectors
Halfback	Don Heap	Northwestern	CP
Halfback	Andy Uram	Minnesota	TSN

== 1937 NFL draft ==
The following Big Ten players were among the first 100 players selected in the 1937 NFL draft:

Name	Position	Team	Round	Overall pick
Ed Widseth	Back	Minnesota	1	4
Eddie Jankowski	Back	Wisconsin	1	9
Johnny Drake	Tackle	Purdue	1	10
Charley Hamrick	Tackle	Ohio State	2	17
Jules Alfonse	Tackle	Minnesota	2	20
Vern Huffman	End	Indiana	3	27
Bud Wilkinson	End	Minnesota	3	29
Bud Svendsen	End	Minnesota	4	39
Dewitt Gibson	Guard	Northwestern	5	49
Inwood Smith	Tackle	Ohio State	5	50
John Golemgeske	Tackle	Wisconsin	6	53
George Bell	Tackle	Purdue	6	57
Merle Wendt	Tackle	Ohio State	6	59
Chris Del Sasso	Tackle	Indiana	6	60
Steve Reid	Tackle	Northwestern	8	71
Elvin Sayre	Back	Illinois	8	77
Steve Toth	Center	Northwestern	8	78
Matt Patanelli	Tackle	Michigan	9	85
Ray Antil	Back	Minnesota	10	91
