= 1936 Marquette Golden Avalanche football team =

American college football season

1936 Marquette Golden Avalanche football

Cotton Bowl Classic, L 6–16 vs. TCU
- Conference: Independent

Ranking
- AP: No. 20
- Record: 7–2
- Head coach: Frank Murray (15th season)
- Captain: Ray "Buzz" Buivid
- Home stadium: Marquette Stadium

1936 Midwestern college football independents records
	Conf.			Overall
Team	W	L	T	W		L		T
DePaul		–		7	–	2	–	0
No. 20 Marquette		–		7	–	2	–	0
Michigan State		–		6	–	1	–	2
Michigan State Normal		–		6	–	2	–	0
No. 8 Notre Dame		–		6	–	2	–	1
Wayne		–		5	–	2	–	1
Detroit		–		7	–	3	–	0
Xavier		–		6	–	4	–	0
Saint Louis		–		5	–	4	–	1
Central Michigan		–		3	–	4	–	1
Michigan Tech		–		2	–	3	–	0
Western State Teachers		–		2	–	5	–	0
Haskell		–		1	–	6	–	1
Rankings from AP Poll

The 1936 Marquette Golden Avalanche football team was an American football team that represented Marquette University as an independent during the 1936 college football season. In its 15th season under head coach Frank Murray, the Avalanche compiled a 7–2 record and outscored opponents by a total of 136 to 60. They won their first seven games, including victories over Wisconsin, Michigan State, No. 20 Saint Mary's, and Ole Miss, but lost their final two games against No. 20 Duquesne and against No. 16 TCU in the inaugural Cotton Bowl. The Avalanche was ranked as high as No. 4 in the AP poll, but dropped to No. 20 in the final poll.

Left halfback and team captain Ray "Buzz" Buivid was a two-way player who averaged 58 minutes per game and earned a reputation as one of the country's top passers. He was a consensus first-team pick on the 1936 All-America college football team; he also finished third in the voting for the 1936 Heisman Trophy. Quarterback Art Guepe received all-Catholic honors and had a game-winning 60-yard touchdown run in the fourth quarter against Creighton and returned a punt 60 yards for the first touchdown in Cotton Bowl history.

The team played its home games at Marquette Stadium in Milwaukee.

== Schedule ==
Date	Opponent	Rank	Site	Result	Attendance	Source
October 3	at Wisconsin		Camp Randall Stadium; Madison, WI	W 12–6	32,000–34,000	
October 10	vs. Saint Louis		Soldier Field; Chicago, IL	W 32–6	10,000–30,000	
October 17	Kansas State		Marquette Stadium; Milwaukee, WI	W 13–0	8,000–9,000	
October 24	Michigan State^{†}	No. 20	Marquette Stadium; Milwaukee, WI	W 13–7	20,000	
October 30	vs. No. 20 Saint Mary's	No. 10	Soldier Field; Chicago, IL	W 20–6	50,000–60,000	
November 7	at Creighton	No. 4	Creighton Stadium; Omaha, NE	W 7–6	8,000–11,000	
November 14	Ole Miss	No. 8	Marquette Stadium; Milwaukee, WI	W 33–0	17,000	
November 21	at No. 20 Duquesne	No. 7	Forbes Field; Pittsburgh, PA	L 13–0	27,871	
January 1, 1937	vs. No. 16 TCU	No. 20	Cotton Bowl; Dallas, TX (Cotton Bowl Classic)	L 16–6	15,000	
^{†}Homecoming; Rankings from AP Poll released prior to the game

== Rankings ==
Ranking movements Legend: ██ Increase in ranking ██ Decrease in ranking
	Week						
Poll	1	2	3	4	5	6	Final
AP	20	10	4	8	7	15	20

== Game summaries ==
=== Wisconsin ===
Team	1	2	3	4	Total
• Marquette	6	0	6	0	12
Wisconsin	0	0	0	6	6

- Location: Madison, Wisconsin
- Game attendance: 34,000

On October 3, Marquette opened its season with a 12–6 victory over Wisconsin on the road at Camp Randall Stadium. Art Guepe scored on touchdown passes from Ray Buivid in the first and third quarters. The Badgers responded with their lone touchdown in the fourth quarter when Irv Windward threw a three-yard touchdown pass to Roy Bellin. Although the Badgers outgained the Golden Avalanche in total offense 201 yards to 177, they lost the game, 12–6.

=== Saint Louis ===
Team	1	2	3	4	Total
Saint Louis	0	0	0	6	6
• Marquette	6	7	7	12	32

- Location: Chicago, Illinois
- Game attendance: 30,000

On October 10, Marquette defeated Saint Louis, 32–6, at Soldier Field in Chicago. The Golden Avalanche took a 6–0 lead on their first possession after driving 65-yards with Ray Buivid making the touchdown score after he recovered his own fumble from six-yards out. They extended the lead to 13–0 on the second play of the second quarter when Art Guepe scored on a 72-yard touchdown run. Guepe scored again in the third quarter, and Raymond Sonnenberg had two touchdown receptions in the fourth quarter, the first from Guepe and the second from Buivid. The Billikens scored a late touchdown as Ralph Hemp connected with Carl Totsch for a 35-yard touchdown. Marquette outgained Saint Louis in total offense 318 yards to 91.

=== Kansas State ===
Team	1	2	3	4	Total
Kansas State	0	0	0	0	0
• Marquette	0	0	0	13	13

- Location: Milwaukee, Wisconsin
- Game attendance: 9,000

On October 17, Marquette played its first home game, defeating Kansas State, 13–0. After a scoreless tie through three quarters, Marquette scored on the second play of the fourth quarter when Al Guepe ran three yards for a touchdown. Art Guepe also scored later in the quarter. The Wildcats outgained Marquette in total offense by 164 yards to 127 yards.

=== Michigan State ===
Team	1	2	3	4	Total
Michigan State	0	0	7	0	7
• Marquette	0	6	0	7	13

- Location: Milwaukee, Wisconsin
- Game attendance: 19,000

On homecoming at Marquette, the Golden Avalanche defeated the previously unbeaten Michigan State Spartans 13–7. After a scoreless first quarter, Marquette scored first after Ray Buivid threw a 40-yard touchdown pass to Art Guepe to give the Golden Avalanche a 6–0 halftime lead. In the third quarter, the Spartans took a 7–6 lead after John Pingel threw a seven-yard touchdown strike to Ernest Bremer. Trailing for the first time all season, Marquette secured the 13–7 victory with a fourth-quarter touchdown. The score came on a Ray Buivid touchdown pass to Herbert Anderson.

=== Saint Mary's ===
Team	1	2	3	4	Total
Saint Mary's	6	0	0	0	6
• Marquette	13	0	0	7	20

- Location: Chicago, Illinois
- Game attendance: 50,000–60,000

Before the largest crowd to ever witness a Marquette football game at Chicago's Soldier Field, the Golden Avalanche defeated the Saint Mary's Gaels, 20–6. Ray Buivid scored the first touchdown of the game on a 13-yard run to give Marquette a 7–0 lead. On the ensuing Gaels drive, Saint Mary's quarterback Edward O'Laughlin threw an interception that was returned by Buivid 75-yards for a touchdown and a 13–0 Golden Avalanche lead. O'Laughlin responded on the ensuing 65-yard drive with a rushing touchdown to cut the Marquette lead to 13–6. The final points of the game came late in the fourth quarter when Red Higgins caught a deflected Buivid pass for a touchdown. The 20–6 loss by the Gaels was their worst intersectional defeat since Slip Madigan took over as their head coach in 1921.

=== Creighton ===
Team	1	2	3	4	Total
• Marquette	0	0	0	7	7
Creighton	0	6	0	0	6

- Location: Omaha, Nebraska
- Game attendance: 8,000

On November 7, Marquette defeated Creighton, 7–6, before a homecoming crowd of 8,000 at Creighton Stadium in Omaha, Nebraska. Creighton scored the first points of the game in the second quarter. Frank Wilcox intercepted a Ray Buivid pass and returned it for a touchdown. Frank Jones then missed the extra point, and the Bluejays held a 6–0 lead into the fourth quarter. In the fourth, Art Guepe returned a Creighton punt 80 yards for an apparent touchdown only to be called back due to a Marquette offsides penalty. After failing to score on the ensuing drive and holding the Bluejays scoreless on their next possession, Guepe returned the next Creighton punt 75 yards for a game-tying touchdown. Ward Cuff then successfully converted the extra point, and the Golden Avalanche won the game, 7–6, to remain undefeated.

=== Ole Miss ===
Team	1	2	3	4	Total
Ole Miss	0	0	0	0	0
• Marquette	0	13	7	13	33

- Location: Milwaukee, Wisconsin
- Game attendance: 17,000

In its final home game, Marquette shutout Ole Miss, 33–0. After a scoreless first, Art Guepe scored the first of his three touchdowns on a 14-yard run in the second quarter to give Marquette a 7–0 lead after a successful extra point. Later in the period, Ray Buivid threw a five-yard touchdown strike to Raymond Sonnenberg to cap an 11-play, 80-yard drive. The Golden Avalanche lead was then extended to 20–0 after a one-yard Guepe touchdown run in the third quarter. In the fourth quarter, Guepe scored his final touchdown of the game on a 40-yard punt return and Buivid connected with LeRoy McMahon on a 27-yard touchdown pass to make the final score 33–0.

=== Duquesne ===
Team	1	2	3	4	Total
Marquette	0	0	0	0	0
• Duquesne	6	0	0	7	13

- Location: Pittsburgh, Pennsylvania
- Game attendance: 27,871

On November 21, Marquette lost to No. 20 Duquesne by a 13–0 score before a crowd of 27,871 at Forbes Field in Pittsburgh. It was Marquette's first loss of the season and only the second loss in the combined 1935 and 1936 seasons. Duquesne's Boyd Brumbaugh was responsible for both of the game's touchdowns. The first came on a Brumbaugh pass to Ernie Hefferle on a faked reverse in the first quarter, and the second on a three-yard run in the fourth quarter..

=== TCU ===
Team	1	2	3	4	Total
#20 Marquette	6	0	0	0	6
• #16 TCU	10	6	0	0	16

- Location: Dallas, Texas
- Game attendance: 17,000

On January 1, 1937, Marquette faced TCU in the inaugural Cotton Bowl Classic in Dallas. Billed as a battle between college football's two most prolific passers of the previous two seasons, TCU's Sammy Baugh and Marquette's Ray Buivid, the Horned Frogs prevailed 16–6. L. D. Meyer opened the scoring with a 33-yard field goal to give TCU an early 3–0 lead. The Avalanche responded with its only points of the game later in the quarter when Art Guepe returned a punt 60-yards to give Marquette its only lead of the game at 6–3. The Horned Frogs retook the lead at the end of the first quarter when Baugh threw a 55-yard touchdown pass to Meyer to give TCU a 10–6 lead which they would not relinquish. The final points of the game came in the second quarter on an 18-yard Vic Montgomery touchdown strike again to Meyer.

== Personnel ==
=== Coaching staff ===
The Golden Avalanche was led by head coach Frank Murray who entered his 15th season in that role at Marquette. He resigned his position in February 1937 to assume the role of head coach at Virginia.

Name	Position	Seasons at Marquette	Alma mater
Frank Murray	Head coach	15	Tufts (1908)
Red Dunn	Backfield coach		Marquette (1923)
Tarzan Taylor	Line coach	8	Ohio State

=== Players ===
- Herbert Anderson
- Robert Boylan
- Ray "Buzz" Buivid, left halfback
- Morgan Busch
- Oliver Butler
- James Fenimore Cooper
- Joseph Cuchetti
- Ward Cuff
- Walter Eichenberger
- Al Guepe
- Art Guepe, quarterback
- Robert Hanel
- Howard Hansen
- Norman Helding
- Vincent Hotton
- Roy Hovel
- William Jennings
- Harold Kieffer
- George Knipp
- Ralph Kuhn
- Joseph Lauterbach
- Wallace Lauterbach
- Roger Lumb
- Joseph Matt
- Earl McEssy
- LeRoy McMahon
- Elroy Mieritz
- Joseph Mosovsky
- Edwin Niemi
- John O'Melia
- John Puestow
- Myles Reif
- Delbert Rider
- Edward St. Eve
- Roy Schoemann
- Carl Siefert
- Raymond Sonnenberg
- Lloyd Tappa
- Patrick Toal
- Anthony Weiler
- Brendan Williams
