= 1936 Wisconsin Badgers football team =

American college football season

1936 Wisconsin Badgers football
- Conference: Big Ten Conference
- Record: 2–6 (0–4 Big Ten)
- Head coach: Harry Stuhldreher (1st season)
- MVP: Eddie Jankowski
- Captain: John Golemgeske
- Home stadium: Camp Randall Stadium

1936 Big Ten Conference football standings
| | Conf. | | | | | Overall |
| Team | W | | L | | T | W | | L | | T |
|---|---|---|---|---|---|---|---|---|---|---|
| No. 7 Northwestern $ | 6 | – | 0 | – | 0 | 7 | – | 1 | – | 0 |
| No. 1 Minnesota | 4 | – | 1 | – | 0 | 7 | – | 1 | – | 0 |
| Ohio State | 4 | – | 1 | – | 0 | 5 | – | 3 | – | 0 |
| Indiana | 3 | – | 1 | – | 1 | 5 | – | 2 | – | 1 |
| Purdue | 3 | – | 1 | – | 1 | 5 | – | 2 | – | 1 |
| Illinois | 2 | – | 2 | – | 1 | 4 | – | 3 | – | 1 |
| Chicago | 1 | – | 4 | – | 0 | 2 | – | 5 | – | 1 |
| Iowa | 0 | – | 4 | – | 1 | 3 | – | 4 | – | 1 |
| Wisconsin | 0 | – | 4 | – | 0 | 2 | – | 6 | – | 0 |
| Michigan | 0 | – | 5 | – | 0 | 1 | – | 7 | – | 0 |
$ – Conference champion; Rankings from AP Poll

The 1936 Wisconsin Badgers football team was an American football team that represented the University of Wisconsin in the 1936 Big Ten Conference football season. The team compiled a 2–6 record (0–4 against conference opponents) and finished in ninth place in the Big Ten Conference. Harry Stuhldreher was in his first year as Wisconsin's head coach.

Fullback Eddie Jankowski was selected as the team's most valuable player. John Golemgeske was the team captain.

The team played its home games at Camp Randall Stadium, which had a capacity of 32,700. During the 1936 season, the average attendance at home games was 19,117.

== Schedule ==
| Date | Opponent | Site | Result | Attendance | Source |
|---|---|---|---|---|---|
| September 26 | South Dakota State* | Camp Randall Stadium; Madison, WI | W 24–7 | | |
| October 3 | Marquette* | Camp Randall Stadium; Madison, WI | L 6–12 | 32,000 | |
| October 10 | at Purdue | Ross–Ade Stadium; West Lafayette, IN | L 14–35 | 18,000 | |
| October 17 | at Notre Dame* | Notre Dame Stadium; Notre Dame, IN | L 0–27 | 16,423–25,000 | |
| October 31 | Chicago^{†} | Camp Randall Stadium; Madison, WI | L 6–7 | 18,712 | |
| November 7 | at No. 1 Northwestern | Dyche Stadium; Evanston, IL | L 18–26 | | |
| November 14 | Cincinnati* | Camp Randall Stadium; Madison, WI | W 27–6 | | |
| November 21 | No. 2 Minnesota | Camp Randall Stadium; Madison, WI (rivalry) | L 0–24 | 33,000 | |
*Non-conference game; ^{†}Homecoming; Rankings from AP Poll released prior to the game
