= John Kulbitski =

American football player and coach (1917–2000)

Biographical details
- Born: January 11, 1917
- Died: June 20, 2000 (aged 83)

Playing career
- 1936–1938: Minnesota

Coaching career (HC unless noted)
- 1952–1953: Minnesota (freshmen)
- 1956–1959: Western Washington
- 1961: Bemidji State

Head coaching record
- Overall: 18–22

Accomplishments and honors

Championships
- As coach: Evergreen (1958); As player: National (1936)

John Adam Kulbitski (November 11, 1917 – June 20, 2000) was an American football player and coach. He served as the head football coach at Western Washington University from 1956 to 1959 and at Bemidji State University in 1961, compiling a career college football coaching record of 18–22. Kulbitski played college football at the University of Minnesota from 1936 to 1938. He was the brother of National Football League (NFL) player Vic Kulbitski.

== Head coaching record ==
Year	Team	Overall	Conference	Standing	Bowl/playoffs
Western Washington Vikings (Evergreen Conference) (1956–1959)
1956	Western Washington	2–6	2–4	6th	
1957	Western Washington	4–3	4–2	3rd	
1958	Western Washington	6–2	4–1	T–1st	
1959	Western Washington	3–5	2–3	4th	
Western Washington:		15–16	12–10		
Bemidji State Beavers (Northern State College Conference) (1961)
1961	Bemidji State	3–6	3–2	T–2nd	
Bemidji State:		3–6	3–2		
Total:		18–22			
National championship Conference title Conference division title or championship game berth
