= 1936 Michigan Wolverines football team =

American college football season

1936 Michigan Wolverines football
- Conference: Big Ten Conference
- Record: 1–7 (0–5 Big Ten)
- Head coach: Harry Kipke (8th season)
- MVP: Matt Patanelli
- Captain: Matt Patanelli
- Home stadium: Michigan Stadium

1936 Big Ten Conference football standings
	Conf.					Overall
Team	W		L		T	W		L		T
No. 7 Northwestern $	6	–	0	–	0	7	–	1	–	0
No. 1 Minnesota	4	–	1	–	0	7	–	1	–	0
Ohio State	4	–	1	–	0	5	–	3	–	0
Indiana	3	–	1	–	1	5	–	2	–	1
Purdue	3	–	1	–	1	5	–	2	–	1
Illinois	2	–	2	–	1	4	–	3	–	1
Chicago	1	–	4	–	0	2	–	5	–	1
Iowa	0	–	4	–	1	3	–	4	–	1
Wisconsin	0	–	4	–	0	2	–	6	–	0
Michigan	0	–	5	–	0	1	–	7	–	0
$ – Conference champion; Rankings from AP Poll

The 1936 Michigan Wolverines football team was an American football team that represented the University of Michigan in the 1936 Big Ten Conference football season. In their eighth season under head coach Harry Kipke, the Wolverines compiled a 1–7 record (0–5 against Big Ten opponents), finished last in the Big Ten, and were outscored by opponents by a total of 127 to 36. They ranked 127th of 131 teams in major college football with an average of 4.5 points scored per game.

Prior to 1936, the Wolverines had lost three consecutive games to the same team only once – to Ohio State from 1919 to 1921. However, in 1936, they lost their third consecutive games against four opponents – Michigan State, Minnesota, Illinois, and Ohio State. Three of Michigan's losses were to teams ranked in the top 10 in the season's final AP Poll: No. 1 Minnesota, No. 7 Northwestern, and No. 10 Penn. Michigan's only victory in 1936 was a 13–0 shutout against Columbia on October 24.

Senior end Matt Patanelli was the team captain. He was also selected as the team's most valuable player and was recognized on both the 1936 All-Big Ten Conference football team (second-team honors from the United Press) and the 1936 College Football All-America Team (second-team honors from the Central Press Association and third-team honors from the Associated Press). Fullback Cedric Sweet was the team's leading scorer with four touchdowns for 24 of Michigan's 36 points scored.

== Schedule ==
Date	Opponent	Site	Result	Attendance
October 3	Michigan State*	Michigan Stadium; Ann Arbor, MI (rivalry)	L 7–21	45,656
October 10	Indiana	Michigan Stadium; Ann Arbor, MI	L 3–14	19,110
October 17	at Minnesota	Memorial Stadium; Minneapolis, MN (Little Brown Jug)	L 0–26	41,209
October 24	Columbia*	Michigan Stadium; Ann Arbor, MI	W 13–0	23,835
October 31	Illinois^{†}	Michigan Stadium; Ann Arbor, MI (rivalry)	L 6–9	29,901
November 7	at No. 15 Penn*	Franklin Field; Philadelphia, PA	L 7–27	30,501
November 14	No. 1 Northwestern	Michigan Stadium; Ann Arbor, MI (rivalry)	L 0–9	28,295
November 21	at No. 18 Ohio State	Ohio Stadium; Columbus, OH (rivalry)	L 0–21	56,277
*Non-conference game; ^{†}Homecoming; Rankings from AP Poll released prior to the game

== Season summary ==
=== Week 1: Michigan State ===
Week 1: Michigan State at Michigan

Team	1	2	3	4	Total
• Michigan State	7	0	7	7	21
Michigan	0	7	0	0	7

- Date: October 3
- Location: Michigan Stadium
- Game attendance: 45,656

On October 3, 1936, Michigan opened its season with a 21–7 loss to Michigan State at Michigan Stadium. The crowd was reported in the press to be 55,000 spectators, "[t]he largest crowd that ever witnessed a State-Michigan contest." The defeat was the third in a row for Michigan against Charlie Bachman's Spartans. Michigan State scored first on a 26-yard end-around by Frank Gaines. Fullback Cedric Sweet evened the score a short time later with Michigan's touchdown; Chris Everhardus kicked the extra point. The first half ended in a 7–7 tie, but in the second half, Michigan State coach Charlie Bachman substituted sophomore halfback, John Pingel, into the game. The Free Press described Pingel as "the best football player on the field." He scored on a 12-yard run in the third quarter. Al Agett added a third Spartan touchdown on a 26-yard end-around in the fourth quarter.

=== Week 2: Indiana ===
Week 2: Indiana at Michigan

Team	1	2	3	4	Total
• Indiana	0	14	0	0	14
Michigan	3	0	0	0	3

- Date: October 10
- Location: Michigan Stadium
- Game attendance: 19,110

On October 10, 1936, Michigan lost to Indiana by a 14–3 score before a crowd of approximately 15,000 at Michigan Stadium. Michigan took a 3–0 lead halfway through the first quarter when Chris Everhardus kicked a field goal from the ball's placement on the 16-yard line. On the first play of the second quarter, Indiana tackle Dal Sasso hit Michigan ball carrier Edward Stanton, the ball popped loose, and Sasso ran 36 yards for a touchdown. Sasso's score was only the second touchdown ever scored by the Hoosiers since Indiana and Michigan first met in 1900. Later in the second quarter, Indiana partially blocked a punt and then scored a second touchdown on a pass from Huffman to Kenderdine. Neither team scored in the second half. The game was close statistically with Indiana tallying 129 rushing yards and 26 passing yards to Michigan's 116 rushing yards and 21 passing yards.

=== Week 3: at Minnesota ===
Week 3: Michigan at Minnesota

Team	1	2	3	4	Total
Michigan	0	0	0	0	0
• Minnesota	6	7	0	13	26

- Date: October 17
- Location: Memorial Stadium, Minneapolis
- Game attendance: 48,000

On October 17, 1936, Michigan lost at Minneapolis by a 26–0 score in a contest with Bernie Bierman's Minnesota Golden Gophers. Minnesota's ground attack led by backs Andy Uram, Vic Spadaccini, Wilbur Moore, and Bud Wilkinson (supported by All-American tackle Ed Widseth) tallied 286 rushing yards to 43 rushing yards for Michigan. Moore also scored on a 60-yard interception return. The victory was the 20th consecutive victory for the Golden Gophers and their third consecutive victory over the Wolverines. The attendance at the game was 48,000. The Minneapolis Tribune praised the efforts of Michigan end Matt Patanelli: "Patanelli was a heroic figure in Michigan's defeat. The Wolverines' captain turned in one of the greatest exhibitions of end play ever witnessed at Memorial stadium . . . Patanelli seemed to be everywhere on defense, plugging up holes here and there and contributing the deadliest tackling imaginable."

Minnesota finished the season ranked No. 1 in the final AP Poll.

=== Week 4: Columbia ===
Week 4: Columbia at Michigan

Team	1	2	3	4	Total
Columbia	0	0	0	0	0
• Michigan	0	7	0	6	13

- Date: October 24
- Location: Michigan Stadium
- Game attendance: 23,835

On October 24, 1936, Michigan won its first and only game of the season, defeating Lou Little's Columbia Lions by a 13–0 score before a crowd of approximately 20,000 at Michigan Stadium. Fullback Cedric Sweet scored Michigan's first touchdown on an 11-yard run in the second quarter, and Wally Hook kicked the extra point. Stark Ritchie intercepted a Columbia pass in the fourth quarter and returned it 32 yards for Michigan's second touchdown. The Detroit Free Press credited Michigan's line, including center Joe Rinaldi, with the victory and with stopping Columbia's halfback, Sid Luckman, who was later inducted into both the College and Pro Football Halls of Fame. The Wolverines out-gained the Lions with 283 total yards to 163 yards.

=== Week 5: Illinois ===
Week 5: Illinois at Michigan

Team	1	2	3	4	Total
• Illinois	0	9	0	0	9
Michigan	0	0	0	6	6

- Date: October 31
- Location: Michigan Stadium
- Game attendance: 29,901

On October 31, 1936, Michigan lost to Illinois by a 9–6 score before a homecoming crowd estimated at 35,000 at Michigan Stadium. It was the third consecutive victory for the Fighting Illini over the Wolverines. Michigan dominated the game statistically with 237 total yards to 66 for Illinois and 13 first downs to two for Illinois. However, Illinois capitalized on Michigan turnovers in the second quarter—kicking a field goal following a Cedric Sweet fumble at Michigan's 10-yard line, then scoring a touchdown after blocking a Cedric Sweet punt at Michigan's 15-yard line and recovering the loose ball in Michigan's end zone. Illinois played a conservative defensive game as Illinois coach Robert Zuppke utilized an old-fashioned defensive formation consisting of a seven-man line with four backs in a diamond formation. Michigan was unable to score until Cedric Sweet ran eight yards for a touchdown in the fourth quarter.

=== Week 6: at Penn ===
Week 6: Michigan at Penn

Team	1	2	3	4	Total
Michigan	0	0	7	0	7
• Penn	7	7	6	7	27

- Date: November 7
- Location: Franklin Field, Philadelphia
- Game attendance: 30,501

On November 7, 1936, Michigan lost to Penn by a 27–7 score before an estimated crowd of 40,000 at Franklin Field in Philadelphia. The defeat snapped a 10-year streak during which Michigan had not lost an intersectional football game. Cedric Sweet scored Michigan's only touchdown on a one-yard run, and George Marzonie kicked the extra point. Penn out-gained Michigan by 212 rushing yards to 98 and 34 passing yards to 0. Harvey Harman's 1936 Penn Quakers finished the season ranked No. 10 in the final AP Poll.

=== Week 7: Northwestern ===
Week 7: Northwestern at Michigan

Team	1	2	3	4	Total
• Northwestern	0	3	0	6	9
Michigan	0	0	0	0	0

- Date: November 14
- Location: Michigan Stadium
- Game attendance: 28,295

On November 14, 1936, Michigan lost by a 9–0 score to an undefeated Northwestern team that was ranked No. 1 in that week's AP Poll. The game was played at Michigan Stadium before a crowd estimated in the press at 40,000. Northwestern out-gained Michigan by 299 yards to 61. Northwestern's Steve Toth kicked a field goal in the second period and scored a touchdown in the fourth. A field goal attempt by Michigan guard George Marzonie in the third quarter fell short by less than a yard. Despite the loss, Tod Rockwell wrote in the Detroit Free Press: "[T]he Wolverines were a vastly improved team today. Michigan showed unexpected power, great tackling and had it pounced on breaks as of old, it might have won the game with plenty to spare."

=== Week 8: at Ohio State ===
Week 8: Michigan at Ohio State

Team	1	2	3	4	Total
Michigan	0	0	0	0	0
• Ohio State	0	6	9	6	21

- Date: November 21
- Location: Ohio Stadium, Columbus, OH
- Game attendance: 56,277

On November 21, 1936, Michigan lost its annual rivalry game to Ohio State by a 21–0 score before a homecoming crowd of 56,202 at Ohio Stadium in Columbus. Led by Cedric Sweet and Stark Ritchie, Michigan opened the game with a 63-yard drive to the four-yard line but were unable to score. Tod Rockwell in the Detroit Free Press wrote that, after the opening drive, "the Wolverine attack seemed to fold as quickly as it developed." In the second quarter, the Buckeyes scored on a touchdown pass from Tippy Dye to Frank Cumiskey to take a 6–0 lead at halftime. In the third quarter, the Buckeyes scored again on a shovel pass from Dye to Robb. The Buckeyes added a field goal and a final touchdown on a 10-yard run by Wasylik. Ohio State out-gained Michigan by 341 yards to 117 yards.

=== Post-season ===
After the season, senior end Matt Patanelli was selected as the team's most valuable player. He was also selected by the United Press as a second-team player on the 1936 All-Big Ten Conference football team. He was also honored on the 1936 College Football All-America Team, receiving second-team honors from the Central Press Association and third-team honors from the Associated Press).

In December 1936, unhappiness with the team's performance was widespread, and the press reported that the school was intent on making sweeping changes and that chances were remote for the return of head coach Harry Kipke. In January 1937, in what was described in the press as "a compromise shakeup", the university fired Franklin Cappon as the team's line coach and assistant athletic director but retained Kipke as head coach for the 1937 season. The press reported that Kipke's retention was in part due to the failure to find a suitable replacement following a careful search. Cappon's dismissal was viewed as a victory for Kipke who had broken relations during the 1936 season. Bennie Oosterbaan and Wally Weber also retained their positions as assistant coaches responsible for the team's ends and backfield players.

== Personnel ==
=== Varsity letter winners ===
The following 27 players won varsity letters for their participation in the 1936 football team. Players who started at least half of Michigan's games are shown in bold.

- **Bill Barclay**, '38, Flint, Michigan - started 7 games at quarterback
- John C. Brennan, '39, Racine, Wisconsin - started 2 games at left guard
- **Robert E. Cooper**, '38, Detroit, Michigan - started 4 games at left halfback
- **Jesse G. Garber**, '37, Brookline, Mass. - started 6 games at left guard
- Elmer Gedeon, '39, Cleveland, Ohio - end
- R. Wallace Hook, Jr., '39, Grand Rapids, Michigan - started 1 game at left halfback
- Fred Janke, '39, Jackson, Michigan - started 3 games at left tackle
- John D. Jordan, '39, Evanston, Illinois - center
- Melvin Kramer - 1 game at right tackle
- Louis Levine, '39, Muskegon, Michigan - started 1 game at quarterback
- James H. Lincoln, '38, Harbor Beach, Michigan - started 3 games at right tackle
- Alex Loiko - started 1 game a right end
- Earle B. Luby, '38, Chicago, Illinois - started 2 games at right tackle
- **George A. Marzonie**, '38, Flint, Michigan - started 5 games at right guard
- **Matt Patanelli**, '37, Elkhart, Indiana - started 8 games at left end
- Edward J. Phillips, '39, Bradford, Pennsylvania - started 1 game at right halfback
- **Joseph M. Rinaldi**, '38, Elkhart, Indiana - started 8 games at center
- Stark Ritchie, '38, Battle Creek, Michigan - started 2 games at left halfback, started 1 game at right halfback
- **Don J. Siegal**, '39, Royal Oak, Michigan - started 5 games at left tackle
- **Danny Smick**, '39, Hazel Park, Michigan - started 5 games at right end
- **John A. Smithers**, '38, Elkhart, Indiana - started 6 games at right halfback, 1 game at left halfback
- Chester C. Stabovitz, '37, Chicago, Illinois - end
- Edward C. Stanton, '39, Charleston, West Virginia - started 1 game at fullback
- Cedric C. Sweet, '37, Fremont, Michigan - started 7 games at fullback
- Arthur Valpey, '38, Detroit, Michigan - started 2 games at right end
- Clarence H. Vandewater, guard, sophomore, Holland, Michigan - starter in 1 game at right guard
- Fred C. Ziem, '38, Pontiac, Michigan - started 1 game at right guard

=== Reserves ===
The following players received "minor awards" for their participation as varsity reserves on the 1936 football team.

- Frank S. Bissell, guard, senior, Hyannisport, Massachusetts - starter in 1 game at right guard
- Robert Campbell, halfback, junior, Ionia, Michigan
- Robert Curren, fullback, sophomore, Warren, Pennsylvania
- Douglas Farmer, fullback, junior, Hinsdale, Illinois
- Harold J. Floersch, end, sophomore, Wyandotte, Michigan
- Edward Greenwald, tackle, junior, Whiting, Indiana
- Ralph Heikkinen, guard, sophomore, Ramsay, Michigan
- Forrest Jordan, guard, sophomore, Clare, Michigan - starter in 2 games at right tackle
- Melvin G. Kramer, tackle, junior, Toledo, Ohio
- Alex Loiko, halfback, sophomore, Hamtramck, Michigan
- Norman J. Nickerson, fullback, sophomore, Detroit, Michigan
- Donald M. Paquette, halfback, sophomore, Superior, Wisconsin
- Ernest A. Pederson, Jr., guard, junior, Grand Blanc, Michigan
- Robert P. Piotrowski, halfback, sophomore, Manistee, Michigan
- Norm Purucker, halfback, sophomore, Poland, Ohio

=== Awards and honors ===
- Captain: Matt Patanelli
- Most Valuable Player: Matt Patanelli
- Meyer Morton Award: John Jordan

=== Coaching staff ===
- Head coach: Harry Kipke
- Assistant coaches:

- Backfield coach: Wally Weber
- Line coach: Franklin Cappon, assisted by Whitey Wistert
- Ends coach: Bennie Oosterbaan
- Others: Ray Courtright (head golf coach, assistant football coach), Ray Fisher (head baseball coach, assistant football coach), Cliff Keen (head wrestling coach, assistant football coach)

- Trainer: Ray Roberts
- Manager: William Bates, Fred Colombo (assistant), Ned A. Kilmer (assistant), Lee Moore (assistant), Edward M. Watson (assistant)

=== Scoring leaders ===
Player	Touchdowns	Extra points	Field goals	Total
Cedric Sweet	4	0	0	24
Stark Ritchie	1	0	0	6
Chris Everhardus	0	1	1	4
Wally Hook	0	1	0	1
George Marzonie	0	1	0	1
Total	5	3	1	36
