= 1936 Oklahoma A&M Cowboys football team =

American college football season

1936 Oklahoma A&M Cowboys football
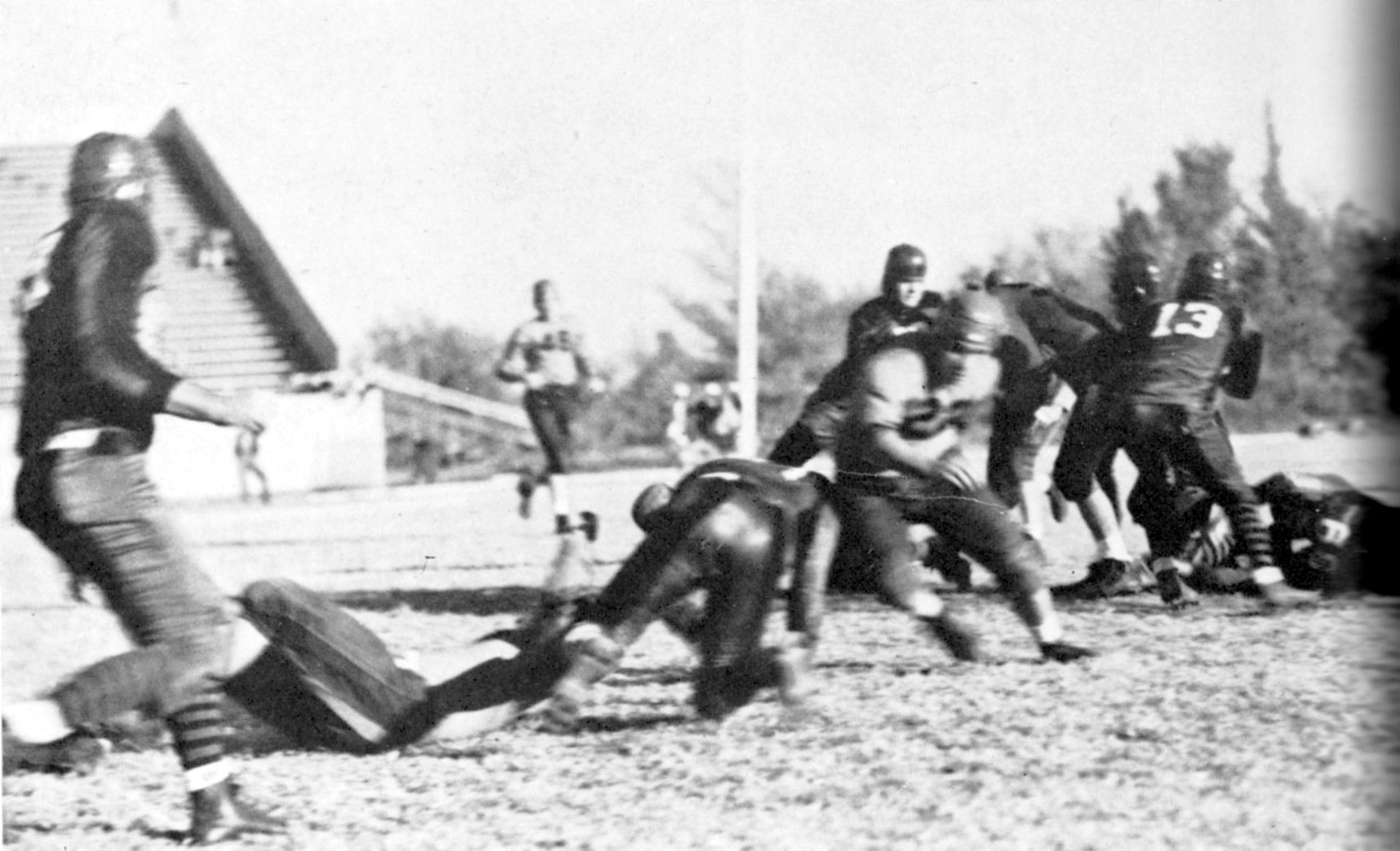
- Conference: Missouri Valley Conference
- Record: 1–9 (1–2 MVC)
- Head coach: Ted Cox (1st season)
- Home stadium: Lewis Field

1936 Missouri Valley Conference football standings
	Conf.					Overall
Team	W		L		T	W		L		T
Creighton +	3	–	0	–	0	4	–	4	–	0
Tulsa +	3	–	0	–	0	5	–	2	–	2
Drake	3	–	2	–	0	4	–	4	–	2
Washington University	1	–	1	–	0	3	–	7	–	0
Oklahoma A&M	1	–	2	–	0	1	–	9	–	0
Washburn	1	–	4	–	0	2	–	6	–	1
Grinnell	0	–	3	–	0	2	–	7	–	0
+ – Conference co-champions; Rankings from AP Poll

The 1936 Oklahoma A&M Cowboys football team represented Oklahoma A&M College in the 1936 college football season. This was the 36th year of football at A&M and the first under Ted Cox who formerly coached at Tulane. The Cowboys played their home games at Lewis Field in Stillwater, Oklahoma. They finished the season 1–9, 1–2 in the Missouri Valley Conference.

== Schedule ==
Date	Opponent	Site	Result	Attendance	Source
September 26	at Oklahoma City*	Goldbug Field; Oklahoma City, OK	L 6–9		
October 3	Kansas State*	Lewis Field; Stillwater, OK	L 0–31		
October 10	at Detroit*	University of Detroit Stadium; Detroit, MI	L 12–46		
October 17	Washburn^{†}	Lewis Field; Stillwater, OK	W 6–0		
October 24	at Tulsa	Skelly Field; Tulsa, OK (rivalry)	L 0–13	10,000	
October 31	at Washington University	Francis Field; St. Louis, MO	L 6–39		
November 6	at Texas Tech*	Tech Field; Lubbock, TX	L 0–12	7,000	
November 14	Baylor*	Lewis Field; Stillwater, OK	L 0–13		
November 21	Oklahoma*	Lewis Field; Stillwater, OK (Bedlam Series)	L 13–35		
November 26	at Centenary*	Centenary Field; Shreveport, LA	L 0–7	5,000	
*Non-conference game; ^{†}Homecoming
