= 1936 Missouri Tigers football team =

American college football season

1936 Missouri Tigers football
- Conference: Big Six Conference
- Record: 6–2–1 (3–1–1 Big 6)
- Head coach: Don Faurot (2nd season)
- Home stadium: Memorial Stadium

1936 Big Six Conference football standings
	Conf.					Overall
Team	W		L		T	W		L		T
No. 9 Nebraska $	5	–	0	–	0	7	–	2	–	0
Missouri	3	–	1	–	1	6	–	2	–	1
Kansas State	2	–	1	–	2	4	–	3	–	2
Oklahoma	1	–	2	–	2	3	–	3	–	3
Iowa State	1	–	3	–	1	3	–	3	–	2
Kansas	0	–	5	–	0	1	–	6	–	1
$ – Conference champion; Rankings from AP Poll

The 1936 Missouri Tigers football team was an American football team that represented the University of Missouri in the Big Six Conference (Big 6) during the 1936 college football season. The team compiled a 6–2–1 record (3–1–1 against Big 6 opponents), finished in second place in the Big 6, and outscored all opponents by a combined total of 107 to 74. Don Faurot was the head coach for the second of 19 seasons. The team played its home games at Memorial Stadium in Columbia, Missouri.

The team's leading scorer was Jack Frye with 36 points.

== Schedule ==
Date	Opponent	Site	Result	Attendance	Source
October 3	Southeast Missouri State Teachers*	Memorial Stadium; Columbia, MO	W 20–0		
October 10	at Kansas State	Memorial Stadium; Manhattan, KS	T 7–7		
October 17	at Michigan State*	Macklin Field; East Lansing, MI	L 0–13	15,000	
October 24	Iowa State	Memorial Stadium; Columbia, MO (rivalry)	W 10–0	8,642	
October 31	at No. 11 Nebraska	Memorial Stadium; Lincoln, NE (rivalry)	L 0–20		
November 7	at Saint Louis*	Walsh Memorial Stadium; St. Louis, MO	W 13–7		
November 14	at Oklahoma	Memorial Stadium; Norman, OK (rivalry)	W 21–14		
November 21	Washington University*	Memorial Stadium; Columbia, MO	W 17–10		
November 26	Kansas	Memorial Stadium; Columbia, MO (rivalry)	W 19–3		
*Non-conference game; Rankings from AP Poll released prior to the game
