= 1936 Dayton Flyers football team =

American college football season

1936 Dayton Flyers football
- Conference: Buckeye Athletic Association
- Record: 4–5 (2–3 BAA)
- Head coach: Harry Baujan (14th season)
- Home stadium: University of Dayton Stadium

1936 Buckeye Athletic Association football standings
	Conf.					Overall
Team	W		L		T	W		L		T
Miami (OH) +	3	–	1	–	1	7	–	1	–	1
Ohio +	3	–	1	–	1	5	–	2	–	1
Marshall	2	–	2	–	1	6	–	3	–	1
Dayton	2	–	3	–	0	4	–	5	–	0
Cincinnati	1	–	2	–	2	1	–	5	–	3
Ohio Wesleyan	1	–	3	–	1	1	–	6	–	2
+ – Conference co-champions

The 1936 Dayton Flyers football team was an American football team that represented the University of Dayton as a member of the Buckeye Athletic Association during the 1936 college football season. In its 14th season under head coach Harry Baujan, the team compiled a 4–5 record.

== Schedule ==
Date	Opponent	Site	Result	Attendance	Source
September 26	at Marshall	Fairfield Stadium; Huntington, WV	L 0–14		
October 3	at Ohio Wesleyan	Delaware, OH	W 21–7		
October 9	DePaul*	University of Dayton Stadium; Dayton, OH	L 0–7		
October 17	at Miami (OH)	Miami Field; Oxford, OH	L 7–14		
October 24	at Cincinnati	Nippert Stadium; Cincinnati, OH	W 21–13		
October 31	Western Reserve*	University of Dayton Stadium; Dayton, OH	L 7–19		
November 7	Ohio^{†}	University of Dayton Stadium; Dayton, OH	L 6–10		
November 14	John Carroll*	University of Dayton Stadium; Dayton, OH	W 6–0		
November 26	Wittenberg*	University of Dayton Stadium; Dayton, OH	W 40–12	4,000	
*Non-conference game; ^{†}Homecoming
