= 1936 Iowa State Cyclones football team =

American college football season

1936 Iowa State Cyclones football
- Conference: Big Six Conference
- Record: 3–3–2 (1–3–1 Big 6)
- Head coach: George F. Veenker (6th season)
- Captain: Clarence Gustine
- Home stadium: State Field

1936 Big Six Conference football standings
	Conf.					Overall
Team	W		L		T	W		L		T
No. 9 Nebraska $	5	–	0	–	0	7	–	2	–	0
Missouri	3	–	1	–	1	6	–	2	–	1
Kansas State	2	–	1	–	2	4	–	3	–	2
Oklahoma	1	–	2	–	2	3	–	3	–	3
Iowa State	1	–	3	–	1	3	–	3	–	2
Kansas	0	–	5	–	0	1	–	6	–	1
$ – Conference champion; Rankings from AP Poll

The 1936 Iowa State Cyclones football team represented Iowa State College of Agricultural and Mechanic Arts (later renamed Iowa State University) in the Big Six Conference during the 1936 college football season. In their sixth and final season under head coach George F. Veenker, the Cyclones compiled a 3–3–2 record (1–3–1 against conference opponents), finished in fifth place in the conference, and were outscored by opponents by a combined total of 112 to 94. They played their home games at State Field in Ames, Iowa.

End Clarence Gustine was the team captain. Gustine was also selected as a first-team all-conference player.

== Schedule ==
Date	Time	Opponent	Site	Result	Attendance	Source
September 26	2:30 pm	Iowa State Teachers*	State Field; Ames, IA	T 0–0	2,973	
October 3	2:00 pm	at Nebraska	Memorial Stadium; Lincoln, NE (rivalry)	L 0–34	27,172	
October 10	2:00 pm	Kansas	State Field; Ames, IA	W 21–7	5,087	
October 17	2:00 pm	Cornell (IA)*	State Field; Ames, IA	W 38–0	4,090	
October 24	2:00 pm	at Missouri	Memorial Stadium; Columbia, MO (rivalry)	L 0–10	8,642	
October 31	2:00 pm	Oklahoma^{†}	State Field; Ames, IA	T 7–7	7,512	
November 14	2:00 pm	at Kansas State	Memorial Stadium; Manhattan, KS (rivalry)	L 7–47	8,727	
November 21	2:00 pm	Drake*	State Field; Ames, IA	W 21–7	7,500	
*Non-conference game; ^{†}Homecoming; All times are in Central time
