= 1936 Nebraska Cornhuskers football team =

American college football season

1936 Nebraska Cornhuskers football

Big 6 champion
- Conference: Big Six Conference

Ranking
- AP: No. 9
- Record: 7–2 (5–0 Big 6)
- Head coach: Dana X. Bible (8th season)
- Home stadium: Memorial Stadium

1936 Big Six Conference football standings
	Conf.					Overall
Team	W		L		T	W		L		T
No. 9 Nebraska $	5	–	0	–	0	7	–	2	–	0
Missouri	3	–	1	–	1	6	–	2	–	1
Kansas State	2	–	1	–	2	4	–	3	–	2
Oklahoma	1	–	2	–	2	3	–	3	–	3
Iowa State	1	–	3	–	1	3	–	3	–	2
Kansas	0	–	5	–	0	1	–	6	–	1
$ – Conference champion; Rankings from AP Poll

The 1936 Nebraska Cornhuskers football team was an American football team that represented the University of Nebraska in the Big Six Conference during the 1936 college football season. In its eighth and final season under head coach Dana X. Bible, the team compiled a 7–2 record (5–0 against conference opponents), won the Big Six championship, was ranked No. 9 in the final AP Poll, and outscored opponents by a total of 185 to 49. The team played its home games at Memorial Stadium in Lincoln, Nebraska.

== Before the season ==
Coach Bible extended the longest head coach tenure in Lincoln to eight years when he brought another well-seasoned football team out to bid for still another league championship, as Nebraska had dominated the Big 6 since its inception.

== Schedule ==
Date	Time	Opponent	Rank	Site	Result	Attendance	Source
October 3	2:00 p.m.	Iowa State		Memorial Stadium; Lincoln, NE (rivalry)	W 34–0	27,172	
October 10	2:00 p.m.	at Minnesota*		Memorial Stadium; Minneapolis, MN (rivalry)	L 0–7	53,000	
October 17	2:00 p.m.	Indiana*		Memorial Stadium; Lincoln, NE	W 13–9		
October 24	2:00 p.m.	at Oklahoma	No. 15	Memorial Stadium; Norman, OK (rivalry)	W 14–0	25,000	
October 31	2:00 p.m.	Missouri^{†}	No. 11	Memorial Stadium; Lincoln, NE (rivalry)	W 20–0	27,000	
November 7	2:00 p.m.	at Kansas	No. 8	Memorial Stadium; Lawrence, KS (rivalry)	W 26–0		
November 14	2:00 p.m.	No. 5 Pittsburgh*	No. 6	Memorial Stadium; Lincoln, NE	L 6–19		
November 21	2:00 p.m.	Kansas State	No. 13	Memorial Stadium; Lincoln, NE (rivalry)	W 40–0	26,000	
November 28	4:00 p.m.	at Oregon State*	No. 10	Multnomah Stadium; Portland, OR	W 32–14		
*Non-conference game; ^{†}Homecoming; Rankings from AP Poll released prior to the game; All times are in Central time

== Rankings ==
Ranking movements Legend: ██ Increase in ranking ██ Decrease in ranking
	Week						
Poll	1	2	3	4	5	6	Final
AP	15	11	8	6	13	10	9

== Roster ==
Amen, Paul #33 E Andreson, William #32 QB; Andrews, Harris #21 HB; Ball, Arthur #20 HB; Baumann, Paul #39 G Belders, George #41 T Boschult, Rolyne #48 T Brock, Charles #47 C Callihan, William #34 FB; Cardwell, Lloyd #24 HB; Dohrmann, Elmer #36 E Douglas, Ronald #25 FB; Doyle, Theodore #43 T Ellis, John #49 T English, Lowell #30 G Fischer, Richard #60 HB; Francis, Sam #38 FB; Franks, Perry #28 G Grimm, Lloyd #44 E Herrmann, William #29 G Hoffman, Hugo #22 HB	Howell, John #13 QB; Hutcherson, James #40 T McDonald, Lester #35 E McGinnis, Kenneth #37 G Mehring, Robert #11 C Mercier, John #26 E Mills, Robert #46 T Peters, Gus #42 G Phelps, Thurston #17 QB; Płock, Marvin #15 HB; Ramey, Robert #16 C Ray, Robert #10 C Richardson, John #31 E Sauer, Ed #23 G Seeman, George #14 G Shindo, Kenneth #39 E Shirey, Fred #45 T Smith, Bernard #18 E White, Ernest #19 QB; Yelkin, Virgil #12 E

== Coaching staff ==
Name	Title	First year in this position	Years at Nebraska	Alma mater
Dana X. Bible	Head Coach	1929	1929–1936	Carson-Newman
Henry Schulte	Lineman Coach	1931	1919–1924, 1931–1937	Michigan
Ed Weir	Freshmen Coach	1929	1926, 1929–1937, 1943	Nebraska
W. Harold Browne	Assistant Coach	1930	1930–1940	
Roy Lyman		1936	1936–1941	
Harold Petz		1936	1936, 1938–1940	
John Williams		1936	1936	
Cornell	Trainer	1936	1936	

== Game summaries ==
=== Iowa State ===
Iowa State at Nebraska

Team	1	2	Total
Iowa State			0
• Nebraska			34

- Date: October 3
- Location: Memorial Stadium • Lincoln, Nebraska
- Game attendance: 27,172

Nebraska began 1936 in fine form, easily running all over the field and taking apart Iowa State in Lincoln. Many big plays marked the game, including a 97-yard kickoff return as Nebraska ran off 34 unanswered points in the shutout victory. The final score was punched in by the reserves, and Nebraska extended their longest ever winning streak over any team to 14 straight, advancing the series to 26–4–1 against the Cyclones all time.

=== Minnesota ===
Nebraska at Minnesota

Team	1	2	Total
Nebraska			0
• Minnesota			7

- Date: October 10
- Location: Memorial Stadium • Minneapolis
- Game attendance: 53,000

Nebraska traveled to Minneapolis for the latest installment of their bitter series with Minnesota, and gave the Golden Gophers all they could handle. The Huskers at one point advanced as close as Minnesota's 14-yard line before being turned away scoreless. Nebraska also held strong in two goal line stands that each ended in interceptions. With just a minute to play and a scoreless tie still on the board, Nebraska was forced to punt. The returner tossed an unexpected lateral to another Gopher player, a move that caused just enough confusion to allow the carrier to run untouched 75 yards for the game-winning touchdown. Nebraska was forced to go home in disappointment yet again, with four straight losses to Minnesota and just a 2–14–2 record against them to date. Minnesota went on to finish 7–1–0, with a #1 national ranking in the first season that teams were ranked by the AP Poll.

=== Indiana ===
Indiana at Nebraska

Team	1	2	3	4	Total
Indiana	3	6	0	0	9
• Nebraska	0	0	13	0	13

- Date: October 17
- Location: Memorial Stadium • Lincoln, Nebraska

This was the first meeting of Indiana and Nebraska, bringing an element of the unknown to the contest. The Hoosiers struck first and managed to shut out the Huskers for the first half, leading 9–0. Following the break, Bible's squad figured out the attack and the defense to turn the tide, running off 13 third quarter points to take the lead, and then held fast for the win. When the AP Poll was released, Nebraska appeared at #15.

=== Oklahoma ===
#15 Nebraska at Oklahoma

Team	1	2	Total
• #15 Nebraska			14
Oklahoma			0

- Date: October 24
- Location: Oklahoma Memorial Stadium • Norman, Oklahoma
- Game attendance: 25,000

Nebraska met Oklahoma in Norman, in front of the largest ever Owen Field audience to date, as Oklahoma was considered one of the main obstacles between the Cornhuskers and another league championship. Nebraska stopped the only serious Sooner threat with an interception while also going up 14–0 before the half. The teams then fought to a standstill for the rest of the game, earning the Cornhuskers their second shutout victory of the season. Nebraska enjoyed their 6th straight win over Oklahoma while advancing the series to 12–2–2. Victory moved the Cornhuskers up to #11 in the AP Poll.

=== Missouri ===
Missouri at #11 Nebraska

Team	1	2	Total
Missouri			0
• #11 Nebraska			20

- Date: October 31
- Location: Memorial Stadium • Lincoln, Nebraska
- Game attendance: 27,000

The most-discussed play of this game took place when a Nebraska lineman broke through Missouri's front to intercept a shovel pass. Quickly tackled, the ball ended up in the hands of a Nebraska end who scampered 40 yards for a touchdown. Nebraska contended that their man fumbled the ball while being tackled, while Missouri claimed that the ball had been intentionally passed to the scoring player. In the end, the call didn't matter, as the Tigers were never able to get on the scoreboard while the Cornhuskers made two other uncontested touchdowns that would have resulted in the same outcome. The Missouri-Nebraska Bell remained in Lincoln as the Tigers failed to win in their last nine tries, falling to 6–21–3 against the Cornhuskers. Nebraska's third win in a row moved them up to #8 in the AP Poll.

=== Kansas ===
#8 Nebraska at Kansas

Team	1	2	Total
• #8 Nebraska			26
Kansas			0

- Date: November 7
- Location: Memorial Stadium • Lawrence, Kansas

With eyes on the continuation of their bitter rivalry with Pittsburgh, coach Bible pulled his starters after just one quarter in Lawrence. The entire Cornhusker roster found playing time in this contest as Kansas rolled over with almost no resistance in front of the smallest crowd Nebraska would play in front of all season. By the time the clock expired on the punishment, Kansas remained scoreless to become Nebraska's third shutout victim of the year. Nebraska's all-time longest winning streak against any single team was extended to 13 games, and their record over Kansas was improved to 32–9–2. Again, the Cornhuskers went up in the AP Poll, to #6.

=== Pittsburgh ===
#5 Pittsburgh at #6 Nebraska

Team	1	2	Total
• #5 Pittsburgh			19
#6 Nebraska			6

- Date: November 14
- Location: Memorial Stadium • Lincoln, Nebraska

Nebraska had rested its starters with eyes on this game, and gave the visiting Panthers a hard battle. With the game tied at 6–6, hopes were high that the Huskers might yet pull off their first victory since 1921, but the momentum turned against Nebraska when Pittsburgh managed to punch one in. The collapse was complete when Pitt recovered a fumble and converted it into another score in short order. Nebraska had so far dropped four straight games to Pitt, and also remained winless in the last ten attempts, falling to 1–7–3 all time as they tumbled to #13 in the AP Poll. Pittsburgh went on to finish 7–1–1, with a #3 national ranking in the first season that teams were ranked by the AP Poll.

=== Kansas State ===
Kansas State at #13 Nebraska

Team	1	2	Total
Kansas State			0
• #13 Nebraska			40

- Date: November 21
- Location: Memorial Stadium • Lincoln, Nebraska
- Game attendance: 26,000

Stinging over yet another loss to Pittsburgh the week before, the Cornhuskers came out with a vengeance against the Kansas State squad. The Wildcats had been viable opponents in recent years and kept the Nebraska squad winless in the last two meetings, but found themselves with no points and two touchdowns behind at the half. The Huskers went on to roll over Kansas State in the second half, tallying 40 points in the fifth shutout win of the season, locking up another Big 6 title. Kansas State fell to 2–17–2 against the Cornhuskers. Nebraska recovered three spots in the Poll by moving up to #10.

=== Oregon State ===
#10 Nebraska at Oregon State

Team	1	2	Total
• #10 Nebraska			32
Oregon State			14

- Date: November 28
- Location: Multnomah Stadium • Portland, Oregon

The Cornhuskers set the tone for how they intended to end the season very early, by scoring inside the first three minutes. Both teams traded possessions and collected points to set up a 32–14 Husker advantage by halftime. After the break, both teams were successful in stopping each other from making progress, which resulted in the halftime score carrying through to the finish, Nebraska head coach Bible's 50th win with the Cornhuskers. The Cornhusker domination of the Beavers was extended to 5–0–0. The end of season Nebraska win was good enough to move the team up to #9 in the final AP Poll.

== After the season ==
Coach Bible easily pulled in his sixth league title, the program's seventh in the last nine seasons, and led Nebraska to appear in the AP poll's first ever postseason rankings at #9. However, Bible would announce shortly thereafter his departure from Nebraska to take the head coaching position at Texas, where he would spend his final ten seasons as a head coach and bring Texas three conference titles. Coach Bible's time at Nebraska was among the most successful in program history up to that point, as his Cornhusker record stood at 50–15–7 (.743). The program's overall record after 1936 was 270–89–27 (.743) and the league performance was now 87–11–9 (.855). Coach Bible assisted in the coaching search for his replacement, and in short order Lawrence Mcceney "Biff" Jones was named as his successor, taking the reins of the program before the 1937 spring training got underway.

=== Awards ===
Award	Name(s)
All American	Sam Francis
All Big 6 team	Charles Brock, Lloyd Cardwell, Ronals Douglas, Sam Francis, Lester McDonald, Kenneth McGinnis, Fred Shirey
