= 1936 Kansas Jayhawks football team =

American college football season

1936 Kansas Jayhawks football
- Conference: Big Six Conference
- Record: 1–6–1 (0–5 Big 6)
- Head coach: Adrian Lindsey (5th season)
- Captain: Wade Green
- Home stadium: Memorial Stadium

1936 Big Six Conference football standings
	Conf.					Overall
Team	W		L		T	W		L		T
No. 9 Nebraska $	5	–	0	–	0	7	–	2	–	0
Missouri	3	–	1	–	1	6	–	2	–	1
Kansas State	2	–	1	–	2	4	–	3	–	2
Oklahoma	1	–	2	–	2	3	–	3	–	3
Iowa State	1	–	3	–	1	3	–	3	–	2
Kansas	0	–	5	–	0	1	–	6	–	1
$ – Conference champion; Rankings from AP Poll

The 1936 Kansas Jayhawks football team represented the University of Kansas in the Big Six Conference during the 1936 college football season. In their fifth season under head coach Adrian Lindsey, the Jayhawks compiled a 1–6–1 record (0–5 against conference opponents), finished in last place in the conference, and were outscored by opponents by a combined total of 153 to 35. They played their home games at Memorial Stadium in Lawrence, Kansas. Wade Green was the team captain.

== Schedule ==
Date	Opponent	Site	Result	Attendance	Source
October 3	Washburn*	Memorial Stadium; Lawrence, KS	W 19–6		
October 10	at Iowa State	State Field; Ames, IA	L 7–21		
October 17	Oklahoma	Memorial Stadium; Lawrence, KS	L 0–14		
October 24	at Kansas State	Memorial Stadium; Manhattan, KS (rivalry)	L 6–26	12,000	
October 31	Arizona*	Memorial Stadium; Lawrence, KS	T 0–0		
November 7	No. 8 Nebraska^{†}	Memorial Stadium; Lawrence, KS (rivalry)	L 0–26		
November 14	Michigan State*	Memorial Stadium; Lawrence, KS	L 0–41		
November 26	at Missouri	Memorial Stadium; Columbia, MO (rivalry)	L 3–19		
*Non-conference game; ^{†}Homecoming; Rankings from Coaches' Poll released prior to the game
