= 1936 Notre Dame Fighting Irish football team =

American college football season

1936 Notre Dame Fighting Irish football
- Layden's challenges in assemblng his 1936 team
- Conference: Independent

Ranking
- AP: No. 8
- Record: 6–2–1
- Head coach: Elmer Layden (3rd season)
- Captains: Bill Smith; John Lautar
- Home stadium: Notre Dame Stadium

1936 Midwestern college football independents records
	Conf.			Overall
Team	W	L	T	W		L		T
DePaul		–		7	–	2	–	0
No. 20 Marquette		–		7	–	2	–	0
Michigan State		–		6	–	1	–	2
Michigan State Normal		–		6	–	2	–	0
No. 8 Notre Dame		–		6	–	2	–	1
Wayne		–		5	–	2	–	1
Detroit		–		7	–	3	–	0
Xavier		–		6	–	4	–	0
Saint Louis		–		5	–	4	–	1
Central Michigan		–		3	–	4	–	1
Michigan Tech		–		2	–	3	–	0
Western State Teachers		–		2	–	5	–	0
Haskell		–		1	–	6	–	1
Rankings from AP Poll

The 1936 Notre Dame Fighting Irish football team was an American football team that represented the University of Notre Dame as an independent during the 1936 college football season. In their third year under head coach Elmer Layden, the Irish compiled a 6–2–1 record, outscored opponents by a total of 128 to 69, and were ranked No. 8 in the final AP poll. Against No. 9 Pittsburgh, the Irish suffered their worst defeat (26–0) in 11 years. They also lost to Navy, but defeated Army, Ohio State, and No. 1 Northwestern.

Notre Dame guard John Lautar received first-team honors from the United Press on the 1936 All-America college football team. End Joe O'Neill received second-team honors from the Central Press. Lautar and guard Bill Smith were the team co-captains.

The team played its home games at Notre Dame Stadium in Notre Dame, Indiana.

== Schedule ==
Date	Opponent	Rank	Site	Result	Attendance	Source
October 3	Carnegie Tech		Notre Dame Stadium; Notre Dame, IN	W 21–7	15,673–35,000	
October 10	Washington University		Notre Dame Stadium; Notre Dame, IN	W 14–6	9,879–22,000	
October 17	Wisconsin		Notre Dame Stadium; Notre Dame, IN	W 27–0	16,423–25,000	
October 24	at No. 9 Pittsburgh	No. 7	Pitt Stadium; Pittsburgh, PA (rivalry)	L 0–26	66,622–70,244	
October 31	Ohio State		Notre Dame Stadium; Notre Dame, IN	W 7–2	50,017	
November 7	vs. Navy	No. 13	Municipal Stadium; Baltimore, MD (rivalry)	L 0–3	51,126–57,500	
November 14	vs. Army		Yankee Stadium; Bronx, NY (rivalry)	W 20–6	74,423	
November 21	No. 1 Northwestern	No. 11	Notre Dame Stadium; Notre Dame, IN (rivalry)	W 26–6	52,131–55,000	
December 5	at USC	No. 9	Memorial Coliseum; Los Angeles, CA (rivalry)	T 13–13	71,201	
Rankings from AP Poll released prior to the game; Source:

== Personnel ==
=== Players ===
Regular players and starters on the 1936 team were:

- Art Dennis Cronin, left and right tackle, Detroit
- Larry Danbom, fullback, right halfback, Calumet, MI
- Frank Kopczak, right tackle, Chicago
- Joe Kuharich, right guard, South Bend, IN
- John Lautar, captain and left guard, Moundsville, WV
- James Martin, left guard, Concord, NH
- Stephen Miller, fullback, Rock Island, IL
- Fred Mundee, center, Youngstown, OH
- Joe O'Neill, left end, Phoenixville, PA
- Andy Puplis, quarterback
- Bill Smith, right guard, Hacketstown, NY
- Bill Steinkemper, left tackle
- Chuck Sweeney, right end, Chicago
- Bob Wilke, left halfback, Hamilton, OH
- Victor Wojcihovski, right halfback, fullback, Weston, WV
- Joe Zwers, right end, Grand Rapids, MI

A full roster can be found at the cited source.

=== Coaching staff ===
- Head coach: Elmer Layden
- Athletic director: Elmer Layden
- Line coach: Joe Boland
- "B" team coach: Bill Cerney
- Freshman coach: Jake Kline
