= 1936 West Virginia Wesleyan Bobcats football team =

American college football season

1936 West Virginia Wesleyan Bobcats football
- Conference: West Virginia Athletic Conference
- Record: 8–2 (4–0 WVAC)
- Head coach: Cebe Ross (12th season)

1936 West Virginia Athletic Conference football standings
	Conf.					Overall
Team	W		L		T	W		L		T
West Liberty State $	6	–	0	–	1	6	–	1	–	1
West Virginia Wesleyan	4	–	0	–	0	8	–	2	–	0
Concord	5	–	2	–	0	6	–	2	–	0
Glenville State	4	–	2	–	0	5	–	2	–	0
Salem	3	–	3	–	1	3	–	4	–	1
Potomac State	1	–	2	–	1	1	–	3	–	1
Fairmont State	2	–	6	–	0	2	–	6	–	1
Shepherd	0	–	3	–	1	1	–	5	–	1
Morris Harvey	0	–	8	–	0	0	–	11	–	0
Bethany (WV) *	2	–	0	–	0	6	–	2	–	0
Marshall *	1	–	1	–	0	6	–	3	–	1
Davis & Elkins *	1	–	1	–	0	3	–	6	–	1
New River State	1	–	2	–	0	4	–	2	–	0
$ – Conference champion; * – Did not qualify for conference standings Ties did not count in conference standings.

The 1936 West Virginia Wesleyan Bobcats football team represented West Virginia Wesleyan College as a member of the West Virginia Athletic Conference (WVAC) during the 1936 college football season. Led by 12th-year head coach Cebe Ross, the Bobcats compiled an overall record of 8–2 with a mark of 4–0 in conference play, placing second in the WVAC.

== Schedule ==
Date	Opponent	Site	Result	Attendance	Source
September 26	Geneva*	Buckhannon, WV	W 7–6		
October 3	at Davis & Elkins	Elkins, WV	W 26–0	3,000	
October 9	at Saint Vincent*	Latrobe, PA	L 0–6		
October 17	at West Virginia*	Mountaineer Field; Morgantown, WV	L 0–15	7,500	
October 23	at Duquesne*	Forbes Field; Pittsburgh, PA	W 2–0		
October 31	Waynesburg*	Buckhannon, WV	W 14–7		
November 7	at Catholic University*	Brookland Stadium; Washington, DC	W 24–19	5,000	
November 13	Salem	Buckhannon, WV	W 28–0		
November 20	Glenville State	Buckhannon, WV	W 28–6		
November 26	at Marshall	Fairfield Stadium; Huntington, WV	W 6–0		
*Non-conference game
