= 1936 Washington University Bears football team =

American college football season

1936 Washington University Bears football
- Conference: Missouri Valley Conference
- Record: 3–7 (1–1 MVC)
- Head coach: Jimmy Conzelman (5th season)
- Home stadium: Francis Field

1936 Missouri Valley Conference football standings
	Conf.					Overall
Team	W		L		T	W		L		T
Creighton +	3	–	0	–	0	4	–	4	–	0
Tulsa +	3	–	0	–	0	5	–	2	–	2
Drake	3	–	2	–	0	4	–	4	–	2
Washington University	1	–	1	–	0	3	–	7	–	0
Oklahoma A&M	1	–	2	–	0	1	–	9	–	0
Washburn	1	–	4	–	0	2	–	6	–	1
Grinnell	0	–	3	–	0	2	–	7	–	0
+ – Conference co-champions; Rankings from AP Poll

The 1936 Washington University Bears football team represented Washington University in St. Louis as a member of the Missouri Valley Conference (MVC) during the 1936 college football season. In its fifth season under head coach Jimmy Conzelman, the team compiled a 3–7 record (1–1 against MVC opponents), and outscored opponents by a total of 151 to 123. The team played its home games at Francis Field in St. Louis.

== Schedule ==
Date	Opponent	Site	Result	Attendance	Source
September 26	Bradley*	Francis Field; St. Louis, MO	W 32–0		
October 3	at Illinois*	Memorial Stadium; Champaign, IL	L 7–13	20,568	
October 10	at Notre Dame*	Notre Dame Stadium; Notre Dame IN	L 6–14	9,879–22,000	
October 17	at Boston University*	Fenway Park; Boston, MA	L 0–6	2,000	
October 24	Drake	Francis Field; St. Louis, MO	L 18–20	6,000	
October 31	Oklahoma A&M^{†}	Francis Field; St. Louis, MO	W 39–6		
November 6	Duquesne*	Francis Field; St. Louis, MO	L 0–26	14,000	
November 14	at McKendree*	Lebanon, IL	W 33–0		
November 21	Missouri*	Memorial Stadium; Columbia, MO	L 10–17		
November 26	at Saint Louis*	Walsh Stadium; St. Louis, MO	L 6–21	14,000	
*Non-conference game; ^{†}Homecoming
