= 1936 Michigan State Normal Hurons football team =

American college football season

1936 Michigan State Normal Hurons football
- Conference: Independent
- Record: 6–2
- Head coach: Elton Rynearson (15th season)
- Captain: W. Christopher Wilson
- Home stadium: Normal Field

1936 Midwestern college football independents records
	Conf.			Overall
Team	W	L	T	W		L		T
DePaul		–		7	–	2	–	0
No. 20 Marquette		–		7	–	2	–	0
Michigan State		–		6	–	1	–	2
Michigan State Normal		–		6	–	2	–	0
No. 8 Notre Dame		–		6	–	2	–	1
Wayne		–		5	–	2	–	1
Detroit		–		7	–	3	–	0
Xavier		–		6	–	4	–	0
Saint Louis		–		5	–	4	–	1
Central Michigan		–		3	–	4	–	1
Michigan Tech		–		2	–	3	–	0
Western State Teachers		–		2	–	5	–	0
Haskell		–		1	–	6	–	1
Rankings from AP Poll

The 1936 Michigan State Normal Hurons football team represented Michigan State Normal College (later renamed Eastern Michigan University) as an independent during the 1936 college football season. In their 15th season under head coach Elton Rynearson, the Hurons compiled a record of 6–2 and outscored their opponents by a combined total of 76 to 53. W. Christopher Wilson was the team captain. The team played its home games at Normal Field on the school's campus in Ypsilanti, Michigan.

== Schedule ==
Date	Opponent	Site	Result	Source
September 26	Ball State	Normal Field; Ypsilanti, MI	W 6–0	
October 2	Northern Michigan	Normal Field; Ypsilanti, MI	W 12–0	
October 10	at Bowling Green	Bowling Green, OH	L 0–6	
October 17	Wayne^{†}	Normal Field; Ypsilanti, MI	L 0–8	
October 24	at Central State (MI)	Mount Pleasant, MI (rivalry)	W 13–7	
October 31	at Valparaiso	Valparaiso, IN	W 7–6	
November 7	Illinois State Normal	Normal Field; Ypsilanti, MI	W 19–13	
November 14	at Indiana State	Terre Haute, IN	W 19–13	
^{†}Homecoming
