= 1936 Detroit Titans football team =

American college football season

1936 Detroit Titans football
- Conference: Independent
- Record: 7–3
- Head coach: Gus Dorais (12th season)
- Home stadium: University of Detroit Stadium

1936 Midwestern college football independents records
	Conf.			Overall
Team	W	L	T	W		L		T
DePaul		–		7	–	2	–	0
No. 20 Marquette		–		7	–	2	–	0
Michigan State		–		6	–	1	–	2
Michigan State Normal		–		6	–	2	–	0
No. 8 Notre Dame		–		6	–	2	–	1
Wayne		–		5	–	2	–	1
Detroit		–		7	–	3	–	0
Xavier		–		6	–	4	–	0
Saint Louis		–		5	–	4	–	1
Central Michigan		–		3	–	4	–	1
Michigan Tech		–		2	–	3	–	0
Western State Teachers		–		2	–	5	–	0
Haskell		–		1	–	6	–	1
Rankings from AP Poll

The 1936 Detroit Titans football team represented the University of Detroit in the 1936 college football season. Detroit outscored its opponents by a combined total of 194 to 59 and finished with a 7–3 record in its 12th year under head coach and College Football Hall of Fame inductee, Gus Dorais.

== Schedule ==
Date	Opponent	Site	Result	Attendance	Source
September 25	Western State Teachers (MI)	University of Detroit Stadium; Detroit, MI	W 40–0	18,300	
October 4	at Villanova	Shibe Park; Philadelphia, PA	L 6–13	18,000	
October 9	Oklahoma A&M	University of Detroit Stadium; Detroit, MI	W 46–12		
October 17	Auburn	University of Detroit Stadium; Detroit, MI	L 0–6	10,000	
October 24	at Manhattan	Ebbets Field; Brooklyn, NY	W 20–0	15,000	
October 30	Duquesne	University of Detroit Stadium; Detroit, MI	W 14–7	15,000	
November 7	Bucknell	University of Detroit Stadium; Detroit, MI	W 33–7	12,000	
November 14	at Xavier	Corcoran Stadium; Cincinnati, OH	W 16–0	8,000	
November 21	North Dakota	University of Detroit Stadium; Detroit, MI	L 13–14		
November 26	at Creighton	Creighton Stadium; Omaha, NE	W 6–0	10,000	
