= 1936 Kansas State Wildcats football team =

American college football season

1936 Kansas State Wildcats football
- Conference: Big Six Conference
- Record: 4–3–2 (2–1–2 Big 6)
- Head coach: Wesley Fry (2nd season)
- Home stadium: Memorial Stadium

1936 Big Six Conference football standings
	Conf.					Overall
Team	W		L		T	W		L		T
No. 9 Nebraska $	5	–	0	–	0	7	–	2	–	0
Missouri	3	–	1	–	1	6	–	2	–	1
Kansas State	2	–	1	–	2	4	–	3	–	2
Oklahoma	1	–	2	–	2	3	–	3	–	3
Iowa State	1	–	3	–	1	3	–	3	–	2
Kansas	0	–	5	–	0	1	–	6	–	1
$ – Conference champion; Rankings from AP Poll

The 1936 Kansas State Wildcats football team represented Kansas State University in the 1936 college football season. The team's head football coach was Wesley Fry, in his second year at the helm of the Wildcats. The Wildcats played their home games in Memorial Stadium. The Wildcats finished the season with a 4–3–2 record with a 2–1–2 record in conference play. They finished in third place in the Big Six Conference. The Wildcats scored 143 points and gave up 89 points.

== Schedule ==
Date	Opponent	Site	Result	Attendance	Source
September 26	Fort Hays*	Memorial Stadium; Manhattan, KS	W 13–0	4,000	
October 3	at Oklahoma A&M*	Lewis Field; Stillwater, OK	W 31–0	4,000	
October 10	Missouri	Memorial Stadium; Manhattan, KS	T 7–7	8,000	
October 17	at Marquette*	Marquette Stadium; Milwaukee, WI	L 0–13	8,000	
October 24	Kansas^{†}	Memorial Stadium; Manhattan, KS (rivalry)	W 26–6	14,000	
October 31	at Tulsa*	Skelly Field; Tulsa, OK	L 7–10	12,000	
November 7	at Oklahoma	Oklahoma Memorial Stadium; Norman, OK	T 6–6	4,000	
November 14	Iowa State	Memorial Stadium; Manhattan, KS (rivalry)	W 47–7	10,000	
November 21	at No. 13 Nebraska	Memorial Stadium; Lincoln, NE (rivalry)	L 0–40	26,000	
*Non-conference game; ^{†}Homecoming; Rankings from AP Poll released prior to the game

== After the season ==
=== NFL draft ===
The following Wildcats were selected in the National Football League draft following the season.

Round	Pick	Player	Position	NFL club
3	26	Maurice Elder	Back	Boston Redskins
7	66	Rolla Holland	Guard	Boston Redskins
9	81	Paul Fanning	Tackle	Philadelphia Eagles
