= 1936 Oklahoma Sooners football team =

American college football season

1936 Oklahoma Sooners football
- Conference: Big Six Conference
- Record: 3–3–3 (1–2–2 Big 6)
- Head coach: Biff Jones (2nd season)
- Offensive scheme: Single-wing
- Captain: Connie Ahrens
- Home stadium: Memorial Stadium

1936 Big Six Conference football standings
	Conf.					Overall
Team	W		L		T	W		L		T
No. 9 Nebraska $	5	–	0	–	0	7	–	2	–	0
Missouri	3	–	1	–	1	6	–	2	–	1
Kansas State	2	–	1	–	2	4	–	3	–	2
Oklahoma	1	–	2	–	2	3	–	3	–	3
Iowa State	1	–	3	–	1	3	–	3	–	2
Kansas	0	–	5	–	0	1	–	6	–	1
$ – Conference champion; Rankings from AP Poll

The 1936 Oklahoma Sooners football team represented the University of Oklahoma in the 1936 college football season. In their second year under head coach Biff Jones, the Sooners compiled a 3–3–3 record (1–2–2 against conference opponents), finished in fourth place in the Big Six Conference, and outscored their opponents by a combined total of 84 to 67.

No Sooners received All-America honors in 1936, but two Sooners received all-conference honors: tackle Ralph Brown and center Red Conkright.

== Schedule ==
Date	Opponent	Site	Result	Attendance	Source
September 26	Tulsa*	Memorial Stadium; Norman, OK	T 0–0	8,000	
October 3	at Colorado*	Folsom Field; Boulder, CO	W 8–0		
October 10	vs. Texas*	Fair Park Stadium; Dallas, TX (rivalry)	L 0–6	25,000	
October 17	at Kansas	Memorial Stadium; Lawrence, KS	W 14–0		
October 24	No. 15 Nebraska	Memorial Stadium; Norman, OK (rivalry)	L 0–14	25,000	
October 31	at Iowa State	State Field; Ames, IA	T 7–7	7,512	
November 7	Kansas State	Memorial Stadium; Norman, OK	T 6–6		
November 14	Missouri	Memorial Stadium; Norman, OK (rivalry)	L 14–21		
November 26	at Oklahoma A&M*	Lewis Field; Stillwater, OK (Bedlam)	W 35–13		
*Non-conference game; Rankings from AP Poll released prior to the game

== NFL draft ==
The following Sooners were selected in the 1937 NFL draft following the season.

Round	Pick	Player	Position	NFL team
3	35	Bill Breeden	End	Pittsburgh Pirates
4	35	Bo Hewes	Guard	Pittsburgh Pirates
5	48	Red Conkright	Center	Chicago Bears
