= 1936 Cincinnati Bearcats football team =

American college football season

1936 Cincinnati Bearcats football
- Conference: Buckeye Athletic Association
- Record: 1–5–3 (1–2–2 BAA)
- Head coach: Russ Cohen (2nd season)
- Captain: Linus Haby
- Home stadium: Nippert Stadium

1936 Buckeye Athletic Association football standings
	Conf.					Overall
Team	W		L		T	W		L		T
Miami (OH) +	3	–	1	–	1	7	–	1	–	1
Ohio +	3	–	1	–	1	5	–	2	–	1
Marshall	2	–	2	–	1	6	–	3	–	1
Dayton	2	–	3	–	0	4	–	5	–	0
Cincinnati	1	–	2	–	2	1	–	5	–	3
Ohio Wesleyan	1	–	3	–	1	1	–	6	–	2
+ – Conference co-champions

The 1936 Cincinnati Bearcats football team was an American football team that represented the University of Cincinnati as a member of the Buckeye Athletic Association during the 1936 college football season. In their second season under head coach Russ Cohen, the Bearcats compiled a 1–5–3 record.

== Schedule ==
Date	Opponent	Site	Result	Attendance	Source
September 26	West Virginia*	Nippert Stadium; Cincinnati, OH	L 6–40		
October 3	Butler*	Nippert Stadium; Cincinnati, OH	T 12–12		
October 10	Georgetown*	Nippert Stadium; Cincinnati, OH	L 0–7		
October 17	Marshall	Nippert Stadium; Cincinnati, OH	W 13–7	11,000	
October 24	Dayton	Nippert Stadium; Cincinnati, OH	L 13–21		
October 31	at Ohio	Ohio Stadium; Athens, OH	L 7–10		
November 7	Ohio Wesleyan	Nippert Stadium; Cincinnati, OH	T 0–0		
November 14	at Wisconsin*	Camp Randall Stadium; Madison, WI	L 6–27		
November 26	Miami (OH)	Nippert Stadium; Cincinnati, OH (Victory Bell)	T 0–0		
*Non-conference game
