= 1936 DePaul Blue Demons football team =

American college football season

1936 DePaul Blue Demons football
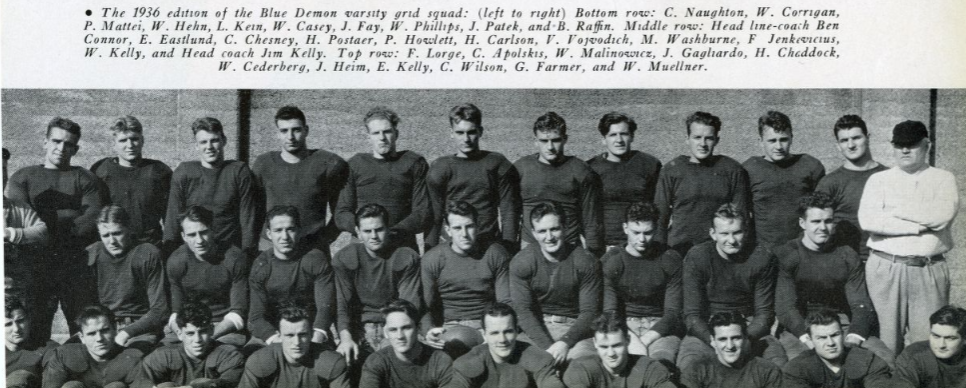
- Conference: Independent
- Record: 7–2
- Head coach: Jim Kelly (5th season)
- Home stadium: Wrigley Field

1936 Midwestern college football independents records
	Conf.			Overall
Team	W	L	T	W		L		T
DePaul		–		7	–	2	–	0
No. 20 Marquette		–		7	–	2	–	0
Michigan State		–		6	–	1	–	2
Michigan State Normal		–		6	–	2	–	0
No. 8 Notre Dame		–		6	–	2	–	1
Wayne		–		5	–	2	–	1
Detroit		–		7	–	3	–	0
Xavier		–		6	–	4	–	0
Saint Louis		–		5	–	4	–	1
Central Michigan		–		3	–	4	–	1
Michigan Tech		–		2	–	3	–	0
Western State Teachers		–		2	–	5	–	0
Haskell		–		1	–	6	–	1
Rankings from AP Poll

The 1936 DePaul Blue Demons football team was an American football team that represented DePaul University as an independent during the 1936 college football season. The team compiled a 7–2 record and outscored all opponents by a total of 149 to 59. The team played its home games at Wrigley Field in Chicago. Jim Kelly was the head coach.

== Schedule ==
Date	Opponent	Site	Result	Attendance	Source
September 26	at Illinois	Memorial Stadium; Champaign, IL	L 6–9	16,589	
October 2	at Saint Louis	Walsh Memorial Stadium; St. Louis, MO	W 6–0		
October 9	at Dayton	UD Stadium; Dayton, OH	W 7–0		
October 17	at Catholic University	Brookland Stadium; Washington, DC	L 7–12	6,000	
October 24	Omaha	Wrigley Field; Chicago, IL	W 46–0	7,500	
October 31	Western State Teachers	Wrigley Field; Chicago, IL	W 19–7		
November 7	North Dakota	Wrigley Field; Chicago, IL	W 19–6	2,000	
November 16	at Arkansas Tech	Buerkle Field; Russellville, AR	W 26–19	3,500	
November 20	at Texas Tech	Tech Field; Lubbock, TX	W 13–6	5,000	
