= 1936 Minnesota Golden Gophers football team =

American college football season

1936 Minnesota Golden Gophers football

AP Poll national champion
- Conference: Big Ten Conference

Ranking
- AP: No. 1
- Record: 7–1 (4–1 Big Ten)
- Head coach: Bernie Bierman (5th season)
- Offensive scheme: Single-wing
- MVP: Ed Widseth
- Captain: Julius Alfonse; Ed Widseth
- Home stadium: Memorial Stadium

1936 Big Ten Conference football standings
	Conf.					Overall
Team	W		L		T	W		L		T
No. 7 Northwestern $	6	–	0	–	0	7	–	1	–	0
No. 1 Minnesota	4	–	1	–	0	7	–	1	–	0
Ohio State	4	–	1	–	0	5	–	3	–	0
Indiana	3	–	1	–	1	5	–	2	–	1
Purdue	3	–	1	–	1	5	–	2	–	1
Illinois	2	–	2	–	1	4	–	3	–	1
Chicago	1	–	4	–	0	2	–	5	–	1
Iowa	0	–	4	–	1	3	–	4	–	1
Wisconsin	0	–	4	–	0	2	–	6	–	0
Michigan	0	–	5	–	0	1	–	7	–	0
$ – Conference champion; Rankings from AP Poll

The 1936 Minnesota Golden Gophers football team represented the University of Minnesota in the 1936 college football season. In their fifth year under head coach Bernie Bierman, the Golden Gophers compiled a 7–1 record and outscored their opponents by a combined total of 203 to 32. The team was named national champion by nine NCAA-designated major selectors, then and in the decades since: Associated Press, Billingsley Report, Dickinson System, Dunkel System, Helms Athletic Foundation, Litkenhous, National Championship Foundation, Poling System, and Williamson. This marked the third consecutive year the team was selected contemporaneously as national champion by at least three math systems. However, the Big Ten Conference did not allow its members to play postseason bowl games at the time, a conference bylaw that would not be changed until 1946.

Tackle Ed Widseth was named an All-American by Collier's/Grantland Rice, Associated Press, INS, NEA, New York Sun, Look Magazine, New York Morning Telegram, Hearst, United Press International and Paramount News. Widseth and halfback Andy Uram were named All-Big Ten first team.

Ed Widseth was awarded the Team MVP award.

Total attendance for the season was 247,653, which averaged to 49,531. The season high for attendance was against Iowa.

== Schedule ==
Date	Opponent	Rank	Site	Result	Attendance	Source
September 26	at Washington*		Husky Stadium; Seattle, WA	W 14–7	36,864–40,000	
October 10	Nebraska*		Memorial Stadium; Minneapolis, MN (rivalry)	W 7–0	53,000	
October 17	Michigan		Memorial Stadium; Minneapolis, MN (Little Brown Jug)	W 26–0	48,000	
October 24	No. 5 Purdue	No. 1	Memorial Stadium; Minneapolis, MN	W 33–0	47,780	
October 31	at No. 3 Northwestern	No. 1	Dyche Stadium; Evanston, IL	L 0–6	48,347	
November 7	Iowa^{†}	No. 2	Memorial Stadium; Minneapolis, MN (rivalry)	W 52–0	63,200	
November 14	Texas*	No. 2	Memorial Stadium; Minneapolis, MN	W 47–19	47,400	
November 21	at Wisconsin	No. 2	Camp Randall Stadium; Madison, WI (rivalry)	W 24–0	33,000	
*Non-conference game; ^{†}Homecoming; Rankings from AP Poll released prior to the game

== Roster ==
- Jules Alfonse
- Raymond J. Antil
- Frank J. Barle
- Raymond Bates
- Phil Belfiori
- Horace D. Bell
- Bruce H. Berryman
- Larry Buhler
- Bob Carlson
- Dan Elmer
- George Faust
- Rudolph Gmitro
- V. Stanley Hanson
- J. Robert Hoel
- Sam E. Hunt, Jr.
- Robert Wesley Johnson
- Edward Kafka
- Warren Kilbourne
- Ray Wallace King
- Florian Klick
- Dominic Krezowski
- John Kulbitski
- Marvin A. LeVoir
- William Matheny
- Lou Midler
- Wilbur Moore
- Dwight T. Reed
- Samuel A. Riley
- Harvey Ring
- Allen W. Rork
- Whitman H. Rork
- Charles Schultz
- Clark L. Snyder
- Vic Spadaccini
- Bud Svendsen
- Tuffy Thompson
- Frank Twedell
- Andy Uram
- Frank J. Warner
- Bob Weld
- Ed Widseth
- Bud Wilkinson
- Harold L. Wrightson
