= 1936 Iowa Hawkeyes football team =

American college football season

1936 Iowa Hawkeyes football
- Conference: Big Ten Conference
- Record: 3–4–1 (0–4–1 Big Ten)
- Head coach: Ossie Solem (5th season)
- MVP: Homer Harris
- Captains: John Hild; Ted Osmaloski
- Home stadium: Iowa Stadium

1936 Big Ten Conference football standings
	Conf.					Overall
Team	W		L		T	W		L		T
No. 7 Northwestern $	6	–	0	–	0	7	–	1	–	0
No. 1 Minnesota	4	–	1	–	0	7	–	1	–	0
Ohio State	4	–	1	–	0	5	–	3	–	0
Indiana	3	–	1	–	1	5	–	2	–	1
Purdue	3	–	1	–	1	5	–	2	–	1
Illinois	2	–	2	–	1	4	–	3	–	1
Chicago	1	–	4	–	0	2	–	5	–	1
Iowa	0	–	4	–	1	3	–	4	–	1
Wisconsin	0	–	4	–	0	2	–	6	–	0
Michigan	0	–	5	–	0	1	–	7	–	0
$ – Conference champion; Rankings from AP Poll

The 1936 Iowa Hawkeyes football team was an American football team that represented the University of Iowa as a member of the Big Ten Conference during the 1936 Big Ten football season. In their fifth and final season under head coach Ossie Solem, the Hawkeyes compiled a 3–4–1 record (0–4–1 in conference games), finished in eighth place in the Big Ten, and was outscored by a total of 103 to 85.

The team played its home games at Iowa Stadium (later renamed Kinnick Stadium) in Iowa City, Iowa.

== Schedule ==
Date	Opponent	Site	Result	Attendance	Source
September 26	Carleton*	Iowa Stadium; Iowa City, IA	W 14–0		
October 3	at Northwestern	Dyche Stadium; Evanston, IL	L 7–18		
October 10	South Dakota*	Iowa Stadium; Iowa City, IA	W 33–7	> 10,000	
October 17	Illinois^{†}	Iowa Stadium; Iowa City, IA	T 0–0	39,000	
October 31	at Indiana	Memorial Stadium; Bloomington, IN	L 6–13		
November 7	at No. 2 Minnesota	Memorial Stadium; Minneapolis, MN (rivalry)	L 0–52	63,200	
November 14	Purdue	Iowa Stadium; Iowa City, IA	L 0–13	15,000	
November 21	at No. 20 Temple*	Temple Stadium; Philadelphia, PA	W 25–0		
*Non-conference game; ^{†}Homecoming; Rankings from AP Poll released prior to the game
