= 1936 Tulsa Golden Hurricane football team =

American college football season

1936 Tulsa Golden Hurricane football

MVC co-champion
- Conference: Missouri Valley Conference
- Record: 5–2–2 (3–0 MVC)
- Head coach: Vic Hurt (1st season)
- Home stadium: Skelly Field

1936 Missouri Valley Conference football standings
| | Conf. | | | | | Overall |
| Team | W | | L | | T | W | | L | | T |
|---|---|---|---|---|---|---|---|---|---|---|
| Creighton + | 3 | – | 0 | – | 0 | 4 | – | 4 | – | 0 |
| Tulsa + | 3 | – | 0 | – | 0 | 5 | – | 2 | – | 2 |
| Drake | 3 | – | 2 | – | 0 | 4 | – | 4 | – | 2 |
| Washington University | 1 | – | 1 | – | 0 | 3 | – | 7 | – | 0 |
| Oklahoma A&M | 1 | – | 2 | – | 0 | 1 | – | 9 | – | 0 |
| Washburn | 1 | – | 4 | – | 0 | 2 | – | 6 | – | 1 |
| Grinnell | 0 | – | 3 | – | 0 | 2 | – | 7 | – | 0 |
+ – Conference co-champions; Rankings from AP Poll

The 1936 Tulsa Golden Hurricane football team represented the University of Tulsa during the 1936 college football season. In their first year under head coach Vic Hurt, the Golden Hurricane compiled a 5–2–2 record and won the Missouri Valley Conference co-championship with a 3–0 record against conference opponents. The team defeated Oklahoma A&M (13–0), and Kansas State (10–7), tied Oklahoma (0–0) and Centenary (3–3), and lost to TCU (10–7) and Arkansas (23–13).

== Schedule ==
| Date | Opponent | Site | Result | Attendance | Source |
|---|---|---|---|---|---|
| September 26 | at Oklahoma* | Memorial Stadium; Norman, OK | T 0–0 | 8,000 | |
| October 3 | Central State Teachers* | Skelly Field; Tulsa, OK | W 40–7 | 10,000 | |
| October 10 | TCU* | Skelly Field; Tulsa, OK | L 7–10 | 14,000 | |
| October 24 | Oklahoma A&M^{†} | Skelly Field; Tulsa, OK (rivalry) | W 13–0 | 10,000 | |
| October 31 | Kansas State* | Skelly Field; Tulsa, OK | W 10–7 | 12,500 | |
| November 7 | Centenary* | Skelly Field; Tulsa, OK | T 3–3 | 8,000 | |
| November 14 | at Drake | Drake Stadium; Des Moines, IA | W 21–6 | 4,500 | |
| November 21 | Washburn | Skelly Field; Tulsa, OK | W 47–0 | 5,000 | |
| November 26 | Arkansas* | Skelly Field; Tulsa, OK | L 13–23 | 16,000 | |
*Non-conference game; ^{†}Homecoming

== 1937 NFL draft ==
The following Golden Hurricane players were selected in the 1937 NFL draft following the season.

| Round | Pick | Player | Position | NFL team |
|---|---|---|---|---|
| 5 | 43 | Ham Harmon | Center | Chicago Cardinals |
| 8 | 79 | Les Chapman | Tackle | Green Bay Packers |
