= 1936 Drake Bulldogs football team =

American college football season

1936 Drake Bulldogs football
- Conference: Missouri Valley Conference
- Record: 6–4 (3–2 MVC)
- Head coach: Vee Green (4th season)
- Home stadium: Drake Stadium

1936 Missouri Valley Conference football standings
	Conf.					Overall
Team	W		L		T	W		L		T
Creighton +	3	–	0	–	0	4	–	4	–	0
Tulsa +	3	–	0	–	0	5	–	2	–	2
Drake	3	–	2	–	0	4	–	4	–	2
Washington University	1	–	1	–	0	3	–	7	–	0
Oklahoma A&M	1	–	2	–	0	1	–	9	–	0
Washburn	1	–	4	–	0	2	–	6	–	1
Grinnell	0	–	3	–	0	2	–	7	–	0
+ – Conference co-champions; Rankings from AP Poll

The 1936 Drake Bulldogs football team was an American football team that represented Drake University in the Missouri Valley Conference (MVC) during the 1936 college football season. In its fourth season under head coach Vee Green, the team compiled a 6–4 record (3–2 against MVC opponents), finished third in the conference, and outscored its opponents by a total of 238 to 132.

== Schedule ==
Date	Opponent	Site	Result	Attendance	Source
September 25	Simpson*	Drake Stadium; Des Moines, IA	W 52–6		
October 2	Coe*	Drake Stadium; Des Moines, IA	W 53–6		
October 9	Central (IA)*	Drake Stadium; Des Moines, IA	W 44–14	4,500	
October 16	Creighton	Drake Stadium; Des Moines, IA	L 6–13	7,500	
October 24	at Washington University	Francis Field; St. Louis, MO	W 20–18	6,000	
October 31	Grinnell	Drake Stadium; Des Moines, IA	W 19–6		
November 7	Denver*	Drake Stadium; Des Moines, IA	L 13–27	4,000	
November 14	Tulsa	Drake Stadium; Des Moines, IA	L 6–21	4,500	
November 21	at Iowa State*	State Field; Ames, IA	L 7–21	7,500	
November 28	at Washburn	Moore Bowl; Topeka, KS	W 18–0		
*Non-conference game
