= 1936 Ohio Bobcats football team =

American college football season

1936 Ohio Bobcats football

BAA co-champion
- Conference: Buckeye Athletic Association
- Record: 5–2–1 (3–1–1 BAA)
- Head coach: Don Peden (13th season)
- Home stadium: Ohio Stadium

1936 Buckeye Athletic Association football standings
	Conf.					Overall
Team	W		L		T	W		L		T
Miami (OH) +	3	–	1	–	1	7	–	1	–	1
Ohio +	3	–	1	–	1	5	–	2	–	1
Marshall	2	–	2	–	1	6	–	3	–	1
Dayton	2	–	3	–	0	4	–	5	–	0
Cincinnati	1	–	2	–	2	1	–	5	–	3
Ohio Wesleyan	1	–	3	–	1	1	–	6	–	2
+ – Conference co-champions

The 1936 Ohio Bobcats football team was an American football team that represented Ohio University as a member of the Buckeye Athletic Association (BAA) during the 1936 college football season. In their 13th season under head coach Don Peden, the Bobcats compiled a 5–2–1 record (3–1–1 against conference opponents), tied for the conference championship, and outscored opponents by a total of 102 to 70.

== Schedule ==
Date	Opponent	Site	Result	Attendance	Source
September 26	at Purdue*	Ross–Ade Stadium; West Lafayette, IN	L 0–47	17,000	
October 10	Marshall	Ohio Stadium; Athens, OH (rivalry)	T 13–13		
October 17	Kent State*	Athens, OH	W 6–0		
October 24	at Miami (OH)	Oxford, OH (rivalry)	L 0–3	10,000	
October 31	Cincinnati	Ohio Stadium; Athens, OH	W 10–7		
November 7	at Dayton*	Dayton, OH	W 10–6		
November 14	at Ohio Wesleyan	Delaware, OH	W 20–0		
November 21	John Carroll*	Ohio Stadium; Athens, OH	W 21–0		
*Non-conference game
