= 1936 Miami Redskins football team =

American college football season

1936 Miami Redskins football

BAA co-champion
- Conference: Buckeye Athletic Association
- Record: 7–1–1 (3–1–1 BAA)
- Head coach: Frank Wilton (5th season)
- Home stadium: Miami Field

1936 Buckeye Athletic Association football standings
| | Conf. | | | | | Overall |
| Team | W | | L | | T | W | | L | | T |
|---|---|---|---|---|---|---|---|---|---|---|
| Miami (OH) + | 3 | – | 1 | – | 1 | 7 | – | 1 | – | 1 |
| Ohio + | 3 | – | 1 | – | 1 | 5 | – | 2 | – | 1 |
| Marshall | 2 | – | 2 | – | 1 | 6 | – | 3 | – | 1 |
| Dayton | 2 | – | 3 | – | 0 | 4 | – | 5 | – | 0 |
| Cincinnati | 1 | – | 2 | – | 2 | 1 | – | 5 | – | 3 |
| Ohio Wesleyan | 1 | – | 3 | – | 1 | 1 | – | 6 | – | 2 |
+ – Conference co-champions

The 1936 Miami Redskins football team was an American football team that represented Miami University as a member of the Buckeye Athletic Association (BAA) during the 1936 college football season. In their fifth season under head coach Frank Wilton, the Redskins compiled a 7–1–1 record (3–1–1 in conference games), tied with Ohio for the BAA championship, shut out four opponents, and outscored all opponents by a total of 84 to 40.

== Schedule ==
| Date | Opponent | Site | Result | Attendance | Source |
|---|---|---|---|---|---|
| September 26 | DePauw* | Miami Field; Oxford, OH | W 14–6 | | |
| October 3 | at Case* | Cleveland, OH | W 20–7 | | |
| October 10 | Western State Teachers (MI) | Miami Field; Oxford, OH | W 6–0 | | |
| October 17 | Dayton | Miami Field; Oxford, OH | W 14–7 | | |
| October 24 | Ohio^{†} | Miami Field; Oxford, OH (rivalry) | W 3–0 | 10,000 | |
| October 31 | at Ohio Wesleyan | Delaware, OH | L 0–13 | | |
| November 7 | Toledo* | Miami Field; Oxford, OH | W 13–0 | | |
| November 14 | at Marshall | Huntington, WV | W 14–7 | 10,000 | |
| November 26 | at Cincinnati | Nippert Stadium; Cincinnati, OH (Victory Bell) | T 0–0 | | |
*Non-conference game; ^{†}Homecoming
