= 1936 Xavier Musketeers football team =

American college football season

1936 Xavier Musketeers football
- Conference: Independent
- Record: 6–4
- Head coach: Clem Crowe (2nd season)
- Home stadium: Corcoran Field

1936 Midwestern college football independents records
	Conf.			Overall
Team	W	L	T	W		L		T
DePaul		–		7	–	2	–	0
No. 20 Marquette		–		7	–	2	–	0
Michigan State		–		6	–	1	–	2
Michigan State Normal		–		6	–	2	–	0
No. 8 Notre Dame		–		6	–	2	–	1
Wayne		–		5	–	2	–	1
Detroit		–		7	–	3	–	0
Xavier		–		6	–	4	–	0
Saint Louis		–		5	–	4	–	1
Central Michigan		–		3	–	4	–	1
Michigan Tech		–		2	–	3	–	0
Western State Teachers		–		2	–	5	–	0
Haskell		–		1	–	6	–	1
Rankings from AP Poll

The 1936 Xavier Musketeers football team was an American football team that represented Xavier University as an independent during the 1936 college football season. In its second season under head coach Clem Crowe, the team compiled a 6–4 record and outscored all opponents by a total of 166 to 102. The team played its home games at Corcoran Field, also known as Xavier Stadium, in Cincinnati.

== Schedule ==
Date	Time	Opponent	Site	Result	Attendance	Source
September 19		Transylvania	Corcoran Field; Cincinnati, OH	W 20–0	4,000	
September 25		Kentucky	Corcoran Field; Cincinnati, OH	L 0–21	12,000	
October 2		Adrian	Corcoran Field; Cincinnati, OH	W 46–0	3,500	
October 9		Western Kentucky State Teachers	Corcoran Field; Cincinnati, OH	W 12–7	2,500	
October 17		at Ohio Wesleyan	Delaware, OH	W 13–6	3,500	
October 23		Davis & Elkins	Corcoran Field; Cincinnati, OH	L 12–13	3,500	
October 31	2:30 p.m.	Centre	Corcoran Field; Cincinnati, OH	L 12–26	3,000	
November 7		Wittenberg^{†}	Corcoran Field; Cincinnati, OH	W 30–0	2,500	
November 14		Detroit	Corcoran Field; Cincinnati, OH	L 0–16	8,000	
November 26		South Carolina	Corcoran Field; Cincinnati, OH	W 21–13	6,500	
^{†}Homecoming; All times are in Eastern time
