= 1936 Michigan State Spartans football team =

American college football season

1936 Michigan State Spartans football
- Conference: Independent
- Record: 6–1–2
- Head coach: Charlie Bachman (4th season)
- Offensive scheme: Notre Dame Box
- MVP: Sam Ketchman
- Captains: Gordon A. Dahlgren; Henry S. Kutchins
- Home stadium: Macklin Field

1936 Midwestern college football independents records
	Conf.			Overall
Team	W	L	T	W		L		T
DePaul		–		7	–	2	–	0
No. 20 Marquette		–		7	–	2	–	0
Michigan State		–		6	–	1	–	2
Michigan State Normal		–		6	–	2	–	0
No. 8 Notre Dame		–		6	–	2	–	1
Wayne		–		5	–	2	–	1
Detroit		–		7	–	3	–	0
Xavier		–		6	–	4	–	0
Saint Louis		–		5	–	4	–	1
Central Michigan		–		3	–	4	–	1
Michigan Tech		–		2	–	3	–	0
Western State Teachers		–		2	–	5	–	0
Haskell		–		1	–	6	–	1
Rankings from AP Poll

The 1936 Michigan State Spartans football team represented Michigan State College as an independent during the 1936 college football season. In their fourth season under head coach Charlie Bachman, the Spartans compiled a 6–1–2 record, outscored their opponents by a total of 143 to 40, and won their annual rivalry game with Michigan by a 21 to 7 score. In inter-sectional play, the team defeated Carnegie Tech (7–0), Kansas (41–0), and Arizona (7–0) and tied Boston College (13–13). The team's only loss was to Marquette by a 13 to 7 score.

Key players included halfbacks John Pingel, Al Agett, and Steve Sebo, fullbacks Art Brandstatter Sr. and George Kovacich, quarterback Charley Halbert, end Milton Lenhardt, and guard Norman Olman.

== Schedule ==
Date	Opponent	Site	Result	Attendance	Source
September 26	Wayne	Macklin Field; East Lansing, MI	W 27–0	17,000	
October 3	at Michigan	Michigan Stadium; Ann Arbor, MI (rivalry)	W 21–7	45,656	
October 10	at Carnegie Tech	Pitt Stadium; Pittsburgh, PA	W 7–0	15,000	
October 17	Missouri^{†}	Macklin Field; East Lansing, MI	W 13–0	15,000	
October 24	Marquette	Macklin Field; East Lansing, MI	L 7–13	20,000	
October 31	at Boston College	Fenway Park; Boston, MA	T 13–13	11,000	
November 7	Temple	Temple Stadium; Philadelphia, PA	T 7–7	20,000	
November 14	at Kansas	Memorial Stadium; Lawrence, KS	W 41–0		
November 21	Arizona	Macklin Field; East Lansing, MI	W 7–0		
^{†}Homecoming
