= 1936 Marshall Thundering Herd football team =

American college football season

1936 Marshall Thundering Herd football
- Conference: Buckeye Athletic Association, West Virginia Athletic Conference
- Record: 6–3–1 (2–2–1 BAA, 1–1 WVAC)
- Head coach: Cam Henderson (2nd season)
- Captain: Herb Royer
- Home stadium: Fairfield Stadium

1936 Buckeye Athletic Association football standings
	Conf.					Overall
Team	W		L		T	W		L		T
Miami (OH) +	3	–	1	–	1	7	–	1	–	1
Ohio +	3	–	1	–	1	5	–	2	–	1
Marshall	2	–	2	–	1	6	–	3	–	1
Dayton	2	–	3	–	0	4	–	5	–	0
Cincinnati	1	–	2	–	2	1	–	5	–	3
Ohio Wesleyan	1	–	3	–	1	1	–	6	–	2
+ – Conference co-champions

1936 West Virginia Athletic Conference football standings
	Conf.					Overall
Team	W		L		T	W		L		T
West Liberty State $	6	–	0	–	1	6	–	1	–	1
West Virginia Wesleyan	4	–	0	–	0	8	–	2	–	0
Concord	5	–	2	–	0	6	–	2	–	0
Glenville State	4	–	2	–	0	5	–	2	–	0
Salem	3	–	3	–	1	3	–	4	–	1
Potomac State	1	–	2	–	1	1	–	3	–	1
Fairmont State	2	–	6	–	0	2	–	6	–	1
Shepherd	0	–	3	–	1	1	–	5	–	1
Morris Harvey	0	–	8	–	0	0	–	11	–	0
Bethany (WV) *	2	–	0	–	0	6	–	2	–	0
Marshall *	1	–	1	–	0	6	–	3	–	1
Davis & Elkins *	1	–	1	–	0	3	–	6	–	1
New River State	1	–	2	–	0	4	–	2	–	0
$ – Conference champion; * – Did not qualify for conference standings Ties did not count in conference standings.

The 1936 Marshall Thundering Herd football team was an American football team that represented Marshall College (now Marshall University) as a member of the Buckeye Athletic Association (BAA) and the West Virginia Athletic Conference (WVAC) during the 1936 college football season. In its first season under head coach Cam Henderson, the Thundering Herd compiled an overall record of 6–3–1 record and outscored opponents by a total of 314 to 78. Marshall had a record of 2–2–1 in BAA play, placing third, and a record of 1–1 against WVAC opponents, but did not play enough conference games to qualify for the WVAC standings. Herb Royer was the team captain.

== Schedule ==
Date	Opponent	Site	Result	Attendance	Source
September 18	at Morris Harvey	Charleston, WV	W 58–0		
September 26	Dayton	Fairfield Stadium; Huntington, WV	W 14–0		
October 2	Valparaiso*	Fairfield Stadium; Huntington, WV	W 81–0		
October 10	at Ohio	Ohio Stadium; Athens, OH	T 13–13		
October 17	at Cincinnati	Nippert Stadium; Cincinnati, OH	L 7–13	11,000	
October 24	Ohio Wesleyan	Fairfield Stadium; Huntington, WV	W 41–14		
October 31	vs. Emory and Henry*	Municipal Stadium; Bluefield, WV	W 52–12	3,000	
November 6	Cumberland*	Fairfield Stadium; Huntington, WV	W 41–6		
November 14	Miami (OH)^{†}	Fairfield Stadium; Huntington, WV	L 7–14	10,000	
November 26	West Virginia Wesleyan	Fairfield Stadium; Huntington, WV	L 0–6	7,000	
*Non-conference game; ^{†}Homecoming
