= 1936 Central State Bearcats football team =

American college football season

1936 Central State Bearcats football
- Conference: Independent
- Record: 3–4–1
- Head coach: Alex Yunevich (3rd season)
- Home stadium: Alumni Field

1936 Midwestern college football independents records
	Conf.			Overall
Team	W	L	T	W		L		T
DePaul		–		7	–	2	–	0
No. 20 Marquette		–		7	–	2	–	0
Michigan State		–		6	–	1	–	2
Michigan State Normal		–		6	–	2	–	0
No. 8 Notre Dame		–		6	–	2	–	1
Wayne		–		5	–	2	–	1
Detroit		–		7	–	3	–	0
Xavier		–		6	–	4	–	0
Saint Louis		–		5	–	4	–	1
Central Michigan		–		3	–	4	–	1
Michigan Tech		–		2	–	3	–	0
Western State Teachers		–		2	–	5	–	0
Haskell		–		1	–	6	–	1
Rankings from AP Poll

The 1936 Central State Bearcats football team represented Central State Teachers College, later renamed Central Michigan University, as an independent during the 1936 college football season. In their third and final season under head coach Alex Yunevich, the Bearcats compiled a 3–4–1 record and were outscored by their opponents by a combined total of 129 to 89.

== Schedule ==
Date	Opponent	Site	Result	Source
September 26	at Baldwin–Wallace	Berea, OH	L 2–65	
October 3	Ferris Institute	Alumni Field; Mount Pleasant, MI	W 22–0	
October 10	at Wayne	Kelsey Field; Detroit, MI	T 0–0	
October 17	at Northern State Teachers	Marquette, MI	W 7–6	
October 24	Michigan State Normal^{†}	Alumni Field; Mount Pleasant, MI (rivalry)	L 7–13	
October 31	St. Mary's (MI)	Alumni Field; Mount Pleasant, MI	W 44–8	
November 7	at Western State Teachers (MI)	Western State Teachers College Field; Kalamazoo, MI (rivalry)	L 0–33	
November 14	Detroit Tech	Alumni Field; Mount Pleasant, MI	L 7–10	
^{†}Homecoming
