= 1936 Washburn Ichabods football team =

American college football season

1936 Washburn Ichabods football
- Conference: Missouri Valley Conference
- Record: 2–6–1 (1–4 MVC)
- Head coach: Elmer Holm (1st season)
- Home stadium: Moore Bowl

1936 Missouri Valley Conference football standings
	Conf.					Overall
Team	W		L		T	W		L		T
Creighton +	3	–	0	–	0	4	–	4	–	0
Tulsa +	3	–	0	–	0	5	–	2	–	2
Drake	3	–	2	–	0	4	–	4	–	2
Washington University	1	–	1	–	0	3	–	7	–	0
Oklahoma A&M	1	–	2	–	0	1	–	9	–	0
Washburn	1	–	4	–	0	2	–	6	–	1
Grinnell	0	–	3	–	0	2	–	7	–	0
+ – Conference co-champions; Rankings from AP Poll

The 1936 Washburn Ichabods football team represented Washburn University during the 1936 college football season. Washburn played their home games at the Moore Bowl in Topeka, Kansas. In their first year under head coach Elmer Holm, the Ichabods compiled a 2–6–1 record and were 1–4 in the Missouri Valley Conference.

== Schedule ==
Date	Opponent	Site	Result
September 25	Wichita*	Moore Bowl; Topeka, Kansas	W 13–6
October 3	Kansas*	Memorial Stadium; Lawrence, KS	L 6–19
October 9	at Kansas State Teachers*	Emporia, KS (rivalry)	L 7–14
October 17	at Oklahoma A&M	Lewis Field; Stillwater, OK	L 0–6
October 23	Grinnell	Moore Bowl; Topeka, KS	W 7–6
October 30	Creighton	Moore Bowl; Topeka, KS	L 20–32
November 7	at Colorado College*	Washburn Field; Colorado Springs, CO	T 0–0
November 21	at Tulsa	Skelly Field; Tulsa, OK	L 0–47
November 28	Drake	Moore Bowl; Topeka, KS	L 0–13
*Non-conference game
