= 1936 Saint Louis Billikens football team =

American college football season

1936 Saint Louis Billikens football
- Conference: Independent
- Record: 5–4–1
- Head coach: Cecil Muellerleile (3rd season)
- Home stadium: Walsh Stadium

1936 Midwestern college football independents records
	Conf.			Overall
Team	W	L	T	W		L		T
DePaul		–		7	–	2	–	0
No. 20 Marquette		–		7	–	2	–	0
Michigan State		–		6	–	1	–	2
Michigan State Normal		–		6	–	2	–	0
No. 8 Notre Dame		–		6	–	2	–	1
Wayne		–		5	–	2	–	1
Detroit		–		7	–	3	–	0
Xavier		–		6	–	4	–	0
Saint Louis		–		5	–	4	–	1
Central Michigan		–		3	–	4	–	1
Michigan Tech		–		2	–	3	–	0
Western State Teachers		–		2	–	5	–	0
Haskell		–		1	–	6	–	1
Rankings from AP Poll

The 1936 Saint Louis Billikens football team was an American football team that represented Saint Louis University as an independent during the 1936 college football season. In its third season under head coach Cecil Muellerleile, the team compiled a 5–4–1 record and outscored opponents by a total of 155 to 114. The team played its home games at Edward J. Walsh Memorial Stadium in St. Louis.

== Schedule ==
Date	Opponent	Site	Result	Attendance	Source
September 25	Missouri Mines	Walsh Stadium; St. Louis, MO	W 31–18		
October 2	DePaul	Walsh Stadium; St. Louis, MO	L 0–6		
October 10	vs. Marquette	Soldier Field; Chicago, IL	L 6–32	10,000	
October 17	at North Dakota	Memorial Stadium; Grand Forks, ND	L 6–13		
October 23	South Dakota	Walsh Stadium; St. Louis, MO	T 6–6	4,765	
October 31	at Wichita	Wichita, KS	W 25–7		
November 7	Missouri	Walsh Stadium; St. Louis, MO	L 7–13		
November 13	Creighton	Walsh Stadium; St. Louis, MO	W 20–7		
November 20	Grinnell	Walsh Stadium; St. Louis, MO	W 33–6		
November 26	Washington University	Walsh Stadium; St. Louis, MO	W 21–6	14,000	
