= 1936 Haskell Indians football team =

American college football season

1936 Haskell Indians football
- Conference: Independent
- Record: 1–6–1
- Head coach: Jack Carmody (1st season)
- Captain: Robert Summers

1936 Midwestern college football independents records
	Conf.			Overall
Team	W	L	T	W		L		T
DePaul		–		7	–	2	–	0
No. 20 Marquette		–		7	–	2	–	0
Michigan State		–		6	–	1	–	2
Michigan State Normal		–		6	–	2	–	0
No. 8 Notre Dame		–		6	–	2	–	1
Wayne		–		5	–	2	–	1
Detroit		–		7	–	3	–	0
Xavier		–		6	–	4	–	0
Saint Louis		–		5	–	4	–	1
Central Michigan		–		3	–	4	–	1
Michigan Tech		–		2	–	3	–	0
Western State Teachers		–		2	–	5	–	0
Haskell		–		1	–	6	–	1
Rankings from AP Poll

The 1936 Haskell Indians football team was an American football that represented the Haskell Institute—now known as Haskell Indian Nations University—as an independent during the 1936 college football season. Led by first-year head coach Jack Carmody, Haskell compiled a record of 1–6–1. Robert Summers, who played at end, was the team's captain.

Carmody was appointed coach of all sports and physical education director at Haskell in the summer of 1936, succeeding John Levi.

== Schedule ==
Date	Time	Opponent	Site	Result	Attendance	Source
September 25		Ottawa (KS)	Lawrence, KS	W 3–0		
October 9		Bethany (KS)	Lawrence, KS	T 6–6		
October 16		at St. Benedict's	Atchison, KS	L 0–25		
October 23		at Emporia Teachers	Emporia, KS	L 0–41		
October 31		at Iowa State Teachers	O. R. Latham Stadium; Cedar Falls, IA	L 0–20		
November 7		at Fort Hays State	Hays, KS	L 0–13		
November 11		at St. Ambrose	Municipal Stadium; Davenport, IA	L 6–21	3,000	
November 26	2:30 p.m.	at Oklahoma City	Goldbug Field; Oklahoma City, OK	L 0–18	3,500	
All times are in Central time
