= 1936 Western State Teachers Hilltoppers football team =

American college football season

1936 Western State Teachers Hilltoppers football
- Conference: Independent
- Record: 2–5
- Head coach: Mike Gary (8th season)
- Captain: George Ockstadt

1936 Midwestern college football independents records
	Conf.			Overall
Team	W	L	T	W		L		T
DePaul		–		7	–	2	–	0
No. 20 Marquette		–		7	–	2	–	0
Michigan State		–		6	–	1	–	2
Michigan State Normal		–		6	–	2	–	0
No. 8 Notre Dame		–		6	–	2	–	1
Wayne		–		5	–	2	–	1
Detroit		–		7	–	3	–	0
Xavier		–		6	–	4	–	0
Saint Louis		–		5	–	4	–	1
Central Michigan		–		3	–	4	–	1
Michigan Tech		–		2	–	3	–	0
Western State Teachers		–		2	–	5	–	0
Haskell		–		1	–	6	–	1
Rankings from AP Poll

The 1936 Western State Teachers Hilltoppers football team represented Western State Teachers College (later renamed Western Michigan University) as an independent during the 1936 college football season. In their eighth season under head coach Mike Gary, the Hilltoppers compiled a 2–5 record and were outscored by their opponents, 80 to 60. Halfback George Ockstadt was the team captain.

== Schedule ==
Date	Opponent	Site	Result	Source
September 25	at Detroit	University of Detroit Stadium; Detroit, MI	L 0–40	
October 10	at Miami (OH)	Miami Field; Oxford, OH	L 0–6	
October 17	Valparaiso	Western State Teachers College Field; Kalamazoo, MI	W 7–0	
October 24	Iowa State Teachers	Western State Teachers College Field; Kalamazoo, MI	L 6–12	
October 31	at DePaul	Wrigley Field; Chicago, IL	L 7–19	
November 7	Central State (MI)	Western State Teachers College Field; Kalamazoo, MI (rivalry)	W 33–0	
November 14	at Butler	Butler Bowl; Indianapolis, IN	L 7–13	
