= Stark Ritchie =

American football player and lawyer (1916–2001)

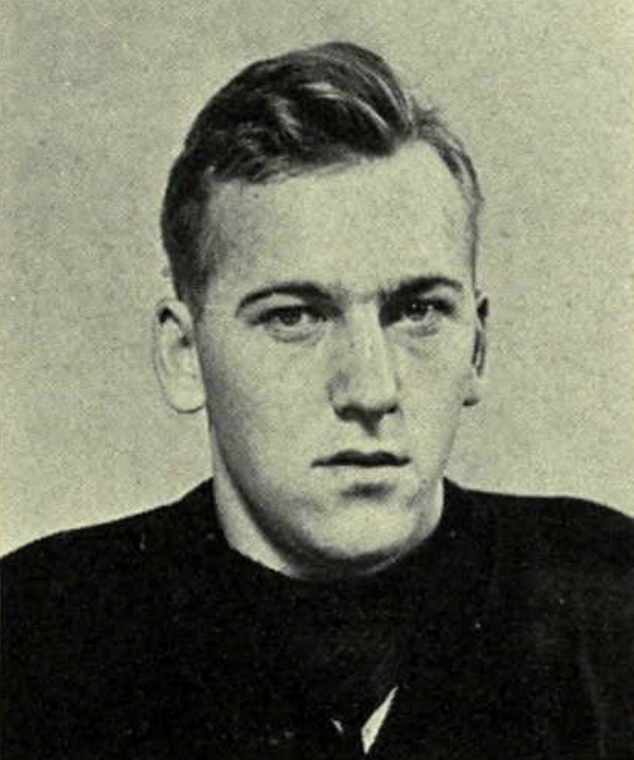

No. 33 – Michigan Wolverines
- Position: Halfback

Personal information
- Born: August 16, 1916
- Died: April 4, 2001 (aged 84)
- Listed height: 5 ft 11 in (1.80 m)
- Listed weight: 180 lb (82 kg)

Career information
- College: Michigan

Career history
- 1935–1937: Michigan

Cary Stark Ritchie (August 16, 1916 – April 4, 2001) was an American football player, attorney and lobbyist. Raised in Battle Creek, Michigan, Ritchie played at the halfback position for the Michigan Wolverines football team from 1935 to 1937. He later became the general counsel of Halcon International in the 1960s and the American Petroleum Institute in the 1970s and 1980s.

== Early life ==
Ritchie was raised in Battle Creek, Michigan. At the time of the 1920 Census, he lived with his grandparents, Gavin Ritchie, who was an immigrant from Scotland, and Kate, who was an immigrant from Ireland. In 1930, he lived with an aunt in Battle Creek. He attended Battle Creek High School where he was an all-around athlete and senior class president.

== University of Michigan ==
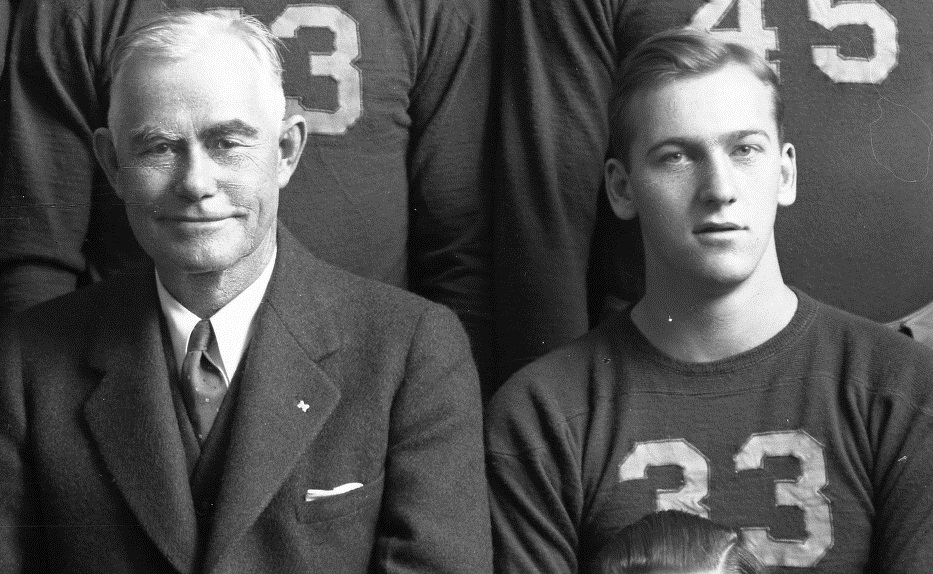
Fielding H. Yost and Ritchie, 1936

Ritchie enrolled at the University of Michigan and played on the freshman football team in 1934. He played halfback for the Michigan Wolverines football team from 1935 to 1937. He suffered a leg injury at the start of the 1935 season that limited his playing time.

Ritchie took over as the Wolverines' number one halfback during the 1936 season. He was one of nine players who appeared in every game for the 1936 Michigan Wolverines football team. Michigan's only victory in the 1936 season was a 13–0 win over Columbia on October 24, 1936. Ritchie played an instrumental role in the win over Columbia, intercepting a pass in the fourth quarter and returning it for Michigan's second touchdown.

As a senior, he scored both of Michigan's touchdowns, including a 41-yard run, in the final four minutes of a 13–12 victory over the University of Chicago on November 6, 1937. The following week, Ritchie led Michigan to a 7–0 victory over Penn with a touchdown pass to Norm Purucker. The New York Times wrote: "Ritchie easily qualified as the individual star. He broke loose for a 54-yard sprint off tackle to the 9 in the first period and crossed the goal line on the next play, but instead of the touchdown the Wolverines drew a 15-yard penalty for holding."

Ritchie received an A.B. degree from Michigan in 1938 and a J.D. degree from the University of Michigan Law School in 1941. He was also the sophomore class president and a member of the Sphinx, the Druids, and the Psi Upsilon fraternity at Michigan.

== Family and later years ==
Ritchie was married to Eleanor Anibal in June 1939 at a ceremony held at her father's home in Bloomfield Hills, Michigan. His wife was also part of the University of Michigan's Class of 1938 and a member of the Kappa Kappa Gamma sorority.

Ritchie became a partner in the Chicago law firm of Norville, Walsh, Cass & Ritchie. He later became affiliated with Standard Oil Company [Indiana]. In 1966, he was hired as the general counsel, vice-president and secretary of Halcon International, a company engaged in research and development in the organic and petrochemical field.

From the early 1970s through the mid-1980s, Ritchie served as the general counsel of the American Petroleum Institute, the largest U.S. trade association for the oil and natural gas industry. He had met Gerald R. Ford while playing football at Michigan and was identified in the press as being part of the President's "inner circle" of friends. Ritchie retired from the American Petroleum Institute position in 1986.

Stark Ritchie married Arvella Wilson on August 10, 1961, and they lived in Washington DC for 30 years.
