= 1936 Creighton Bluejays football team =

American college football season

1936 Creighton Bluejays football

MVC co-champion
- Conference: Missouri Valley Conference
- Record: 4–4 (3–0 MVC)
- Head coach: Marchmont Schwartz (2nd season)
- Home stadium: Creighton Stadium

1936 Missouri Valley Conference football standings
	Conf.					Overall
Team	W		L		T	W		L		T
Creighton +	3	–	0	–	0	4	–	4	–	0
Tulsa +	3	–	0	–	0	5	–	2	–	2
Drake	3	–	2	–	0	4	–	4	–	2
Washington University	1	–	1	–	0	3	–	7	–	0
Oklahoma A&M	1	–	2	–	0	1	–	9	–	0
Washburn	1	–	4	–	0	2	–	6	–	1
Grinnell	0	–	3	–	0	2	–	7	–	0
+ – Conference co-champions; Rankings from AP Poll

The 1936 Creighton Bluejays football team was an American football team that represented Creighton University as a member of the Missouri Valley Conference (MVC) during the 1936 college football season. In its second season under head coach Marchmont Schwartz, the team compiled a 4–4 record (3–0 against MVC opponents), tied for the conference championship, and outscored opponents by a total of 102 to 72. The team played its home games at Creighton Stadium in Omaha, Nebraska.

== Schedule ==
Date	Opponent	Site	Result	Attendance	Source
September 25	South Dakota*	Creighton Stadium; Omaha, NE	W 25–0		
October 10	Grinnell	Creighton Stadium; Omaha, NE	W 12–0		
October 16	at Drake	Drake Stadium; Des Moines, IA	W 13–6	7,500	
October 24	Hardin–Simmons*	Creighton Stadium; Omaha, NE	L 7–13		
October 30	at Washburn	Moore Bowl; Topeka, KS	W 32–20		
November 7	No. 4 Marquette*	Creighton Stadium; Omaha, NE	L 6–7	8,000	
November 13	at Saint Louis*	St. Louis, MO	L 7–20		
November 26	Detroit*	Creighton Stadium; Omaha, NE	L 0–6	10,000	
*Non-conference game; Rankings from Coaches' Poll released prior to the game
