= 1936 Northwestern Wildcats football team =

American college football season

1936 Northwestern Wildcats football

Big Ten champion
- Conference: Big Ten Conference

Ranking
- AP: No. 7
- Record: 7–1 (6–0 Big Ten)
- Head coach: Pappy Waldorf (2nd season)
- Offensive scheme: Single-wing
- Captain: Steve Reid
- Home stadium: Dyche Stadium

1936 Big Ten Conference football standings
	Conf.					Overall
Team	W		L		T	W		L		T
No. 7 Northwestern $	6	–	0	–	0	7	–	1	–	0
No. 1 Minnesota	4	–	1	–	0	7	–	1	–	0
Ohio State	4	–	1	–	0	5	–	3	–	0
Indiana	3	–	1	–	1	5	–	2	–	1
Purdue	3	–	1	–	1	5	–	2	–	1
Illinois	2	–	2	–	1	4	–	3	–	1
Chicago	1	–	4	–	0	2	–	5	–	1
Iowa	0	–	4	–	1	3	–	4	–	1
Wisconsin	0	–	4	–	0	2	–	6	–	0
Michigan	0	–	5	–	0	1	–	7	–	0
$ – Conference champion; Rankings from AP Poll

The 1936 Northwestern Wildcats football team represented Northwestern University during the 1936 college football season. In their second year under head coach Pappy Waldorf, the Wildcats compiled a 7–1 record (6–0 against Big Ten Conference opponents), won the Big Ten championship, outscored their opponents by a combined total of 132 to 73, and were ranked No. 7 in the final AP Poll. Their only loss came on the last day of the season against Notre Dame.

== Schedule ==
Date	Opponent	Rank	Site	Result	Attendance	Source
October 3	Iowa		Dyche Stadium; Evanston, IL	W 18–7		
October 10	North Dakota Agricultural*		Dyche Stadium; Evanston, IL	W 40–7	25,000	
October 17	Ohio State		Dyche Stadium; Evanston, IL	W 14–13	35,000	
October 24	at Illinois	No. 4	Memorial Stadium; Champaign, IL (rivalry)	W 13–2	30,579	
October 31	No. 1 Minnesota	No. 3	Dyche Stadium; Evanston, IL	W 6–0	48,347	
November 7	Wisconsin	No. 1	Dyche Stadium; Evanston, IL	W 26–18		
November 14	at Michigan	No. 1	Michigan Stadium; Ann Arbor, MI (rivalry)	W 9–0	28,295	
November 21	at No. 11 Notre Dame*	No. 1	Notre Dame Stadium; South Bend, IN (rivalry)	L 6–26	52,131–55,000	
*Non-conference game; Rankings from AP Poll released prior to the game
