= 1936 Purdue Boilermakers football team =

American college football season

1936 Purdue Boilermakers football
- Conference: Big Ten Conference
- Record: 5–2–1 (3–1–1 Big Ten)
- Head coach: Noble Kizer (7th season)
- Captain: George O. Bell
- Home stadium: Ross–Ade Stadium

1936 Big Ten Conference football standings
| | Conf. | | | | | Overall |
| Team | W | | L | | T | W | | L | | T |
|---|---|---|---|---|---|---|---|---|---|---|
| No. 7 Northwestern $ | 6 | – | 0 | – | 0 | 7 | – | 1 | – | 0 |
| No. 1 Minnesota | 4 | – | 1 | – | 0 | 7 | – | 1 | – | 0 |
| Ohio State | 4 | – | 1 | – | 0 | 5 | – | 3 | – | 0 |
| Indiana | 3 | – | 1 | – | 1 | 5 | – | 2 | – | 1 |
| Purdue | 3 | – | 1 | – | 1 | 5 | – | 2 | – | 1 |
| Illinois | 2 | – | 2 | – | 1 | 4 | – | 3 | – | 1 |
| Chicago | 1 | – | 4 | – | 0 | 2 | – | 5 | – | 1 |
| Iowa | 0 | – | 4 | – | 1 | 3 | – | 4 | – | 1 |
| Wisconsin | 0 | – | 4 | – | 0 | 2 | – | 6 | – | 0 |
| Michigan | 0 | – | 5 | – | 0 | 1 | – | 7 | – | 0 |
$ – Conference champion; Rankings from AP Poll

The 1936 Purdue Boilermakers football team was an American football team that represented Purdue University during the 1936 college football season. In their seventh season under head coach Noble Kizer, the Boilermakers compiled a 5–2–1 record, finished in a tie for fourth place in the Big Ten Conference with a 3–1–1 record against conference opponents, and outscored opponents by a total of 157 to 95.

== Schedule ==
| Date | Opponent | Rank | Site | Result | Attendance | Source |
|---|---|---|---|---|---|---|
| September 26 | Ohio* | | Ross–Ade Stadium; West Lafayette, IN | W 47–0 | 17,000 | |
| October 10 | Wisconsin^{†} | | Ross–Ade Stadium; West Lafayette, IN | W 35–14 | 18,000 | |
| October 17 | at Chicago | | Stagg Field; Chicago, IL (rivalry) | W 35–7 | 15,000 | |
| October 24 | at No. 1 Minnesota | No. 5 | Memorial Stadium; Minneapolis, MN | L 0–33 | 47,780 | |
| October 31 | at Carnegie Tech* | No. 17 | Pitt Stadium; Pittsburgh, PA | W 7–6 | 20,000 | |
| November 7 | at No. 3 Fordham* | | Polo Grounds; New York, NY | L 0–15 | 40,000 | |
| November 14 | at Iowa | | Iowa Stadium; Iowa City, IA | W 13–0 | 15,000 | |
| November 21 | Indiana | | Ross–Ade Stadium; West Lafayette, IN (Old Oaken Bucket) | T 20–20 | 30,000 | |
*Non-conference game; ^{†}Homecoming; Rankings from AP Poll released prior to the game

== Roster ==
- George Bell, C
- Andy Botney, QB-E-HB
- Forrest Burmeister, G-T
- Johnny Drake, FB
- J. P. Fitzgerald, T-E
- Wayne Gift, QB
- Andy Grant, G
- Lee Graves, G
- Paul Humphrey, C
- Tony Ippolito, FB-QB
- Cecil Isbell, HB
- Cody Isbell, E-C-HB
- Tony Juska, FB
- Woodrow Knorr, G
- Jim Maloney, G
- Ben Medley, HB-QB
- Joe Mihal, T
- Basil Petry, C
- Donald Powell, E
- Bob Purdy, QB-HB
- Martin Schreyer, C-T
- Robert Selby, HB
- George Spehn, E
- Fred Stalcup, QB-HB
- Bill Upton, C
- Bill Vergane, E-T
- Frederick Wahl
- Clem Woltman, T
- Jim Zachary, E
