= 1936 Chicago Maroons football team =

American college football season

1936 Chicago Maroons football
- Conference: Big Ten Conference
- Record: 2–5–1 (1–4 Big Ten)
- Head coach: Clark Shaughnessy (4th season)
- Home stadium: Stagg Field

1936 Big Ten Conference football standings
	Conf.					Overall
Team	W		L		T	W		L		T
No. 7 Northwestern $	6	–	0	–	0	7	–	1	–	0
No. 1 Minnesota	4	–	1	–	0	7	–	1	–	0
Ohio State	4	–	1	–	0	5	–	3	–	0
Indiana	3	–	1	–	1	5	–	2	–	1
Purdue	3	–	1	–	1	5	–	2	–	1
Illinois	2	–	2	–	1	4	–	3	–	1
Chicago	1	–	4	–	0	2	–	5	–	1
Iowa	0	–	4	–	1	3	–	4	–	1
Wisconsin	0	–	4	–	0	2	–	6	–	0
Michigan	0	–	5	–	0	1	–	7	–	0
$ – Conference champion; Rankings from AP Poll

The 1936 Chicago Maroons football team was an American football team that represented the University of Chicago during the 1936 college football season. In their fourth season under head coach Clark Shaughnessy, the Maroons compiled a 2–5–1 record, finished in seventh place in the Big Ten Conference, and were outscored by their opponents by a combined total of 166 to 68.

== Schedule ==
Date	Opponent	Site	Result	Attendance	Source
September 26	Lawrence*	Stagg Field; Chicago, IL	W 34–0	20,000	
October 3	Vanderbilt*	Stagg Field; Chicago, IL	L 0–37	12,000	
October 10	Butler*	Stagg Field; Chicago, IL	T 6–6		
October 17	Purdue	Stagg Field; Chicago, IL (rivalry)	L 7–35		
October 31	at Wisconsin	Camp Randall Stadium; Madison, WI	W 7–6	18,712	
November 7	at Ohio State	Ohio Stadium; Columbus, OH	L 0–44	37,226	
November 14	Indiana	Stagg Field; Chicago, IL	L 7–20	18,000	
November 21	Illinois	Stagg Field; Chicago, IL	L 7–18	15,000	
*Non-conference game
