= 1936 Ohio State Buckeyes football team =

American college football season

1936 Ohio State Buckeyes football
- Program for game against Chicago
- Conference: Big Ten Conference
- Record: 5–3 (4–1 Big Ten)
- Head coach: Francis Schmidt (3rd season)
- Home stadium: Ohio Stadium

1936 Big Ten Conference football standings
	Conf.					Overall
Team	W		L		T	W		L		T
No. 7 Northwestern $	6	–	0	–	0	7	–	1	–	0
No. 1 Minnesota	4	–	1	–	0	7	–	1	–	0
Ohio State	4	–	1	–	0	5	–	3	–	0
Indiana	3	–	1	–	1	5	–	2	–	1
Purdue	3	–	1	–	1	5	–	2	–	1
Illinois	2	–	2	–	1	4	–	3	–	1
Chicago	1	–	4	–	0	2	–	5	–	1
Iowa	0	–	4	–	1	3	–	4	–	1
Wisconsin	0	–	4	–	0	2	–	6	–	0
Michigan	0	–	5	–	0	1	–	7	–	0
$ – Conference champion; Rankings from AP Poll

The 1936 Ohio State Buckeyes football team represented Ohio State University as a member the Big Ten Conference during the 1936 college football season. Led by third-year head coach Francis Schmidt, the Buckeyes compiled an overall record of 5–3 with a mark of 4–1 in conference play, tying for second place in the Big Ten.

The 1936 Buckeyes posted all five of their victories in shutouts but lost each of the three games in which their opponents managed to score.

== Schedule ==
Date	Opponent	Rank	Site	Result	Attendance	Source
October 3	NYU*		Ohio Stadium; Columbus, OH	W 60–0	72,948	
October 10	Pittsburgh*		Ohio Stadium; Columbus, OH	L 0–6	71,714	
October 17	at Northwestern		Dyche Stadium; Evanston, IL	L 13–14	35,000	
October 24	Indiana		Ohio Stadium; Columbus, OH	W 7–0	44,410	
October 31	at Notre Dame*		Notre Dame Stadium; Notre Dame, IN	L 2–7	55,000	
November 7	Chicago		Ohio Stadium; Columbus, OH	W 44–0	37,226	
November 14	at Illinois		Memorial Stadium; Champaign, IL (Illibuck)	W 13–0	19,465	
November 21	Michigan	No. 18	Ohio Stadium; Columbus, OH (rivalry)	W 21–0	56,277	
*Non-conference game; Rankings from AP Poll released prior to the game

== 1937 NFL draftees ==
Player	Round	Pick	Position	NFL club
Charley Hamrick	2	17	Tackle	Detroit Lions
Inwood Smith	5	50	Guard	Cleveland Rams
Merle Wendt	6	59	End	Green Bay Packers
