= 1936 Illinois Fighting Illini football team =

American college football season

1936 Illinois Fighting Illini football
- Conference: Big Ten Conference
- Record: 4–3–1 (2–2–1 Big Ten)
- Head coach: Robert Zuppke (24th season)
- MVP: Cliff Kuhn
- Captain: Elvin Sayre
- Home stadium: Memorial Stadium

1936 Big Ten Conference football standings
	Conf.					Overall
Team	W		L		T	W		L		T
No. 7 Northwestern $	6	–	0	–	0	7	–	1	–	0
No. 1 Minnesota	4	–	1	–	0	7	–	1	–	0
Ohio State	4	–	1	–	0	5	–	3	–	0
Indiana	3	–	1	–	1	5	–	2	–	1
Purdue	3	–	1	–	1	5	–	2	–	1
Illinois	2	–	2	–	1	4	–	3	–	1
Chicago	1	–	4	–	0	2	–	5	–	1
Iowa	0	–	4	–	1	3	–	4	–	1
Wisconsin	0	–	4	–	0	2	–	6	–	0
Michigan	0	–	5	–	0	1	–	7	–	0
$ – Conference champion; Rankings from AP Poll

The 1936 Illinois Fighting Illini football team was an American football team that represented the University of Illinois during the 1936 college football season. In their 24th season under head coach Robert Zuppke, the Illini compiled a 4–3–1 record and finished in sixth place in the Big Ten Conference. Guard Cliff Kuhn was selected as the team's most valuable player.

== Schedule ==
Date	Opponent	Site	Result	Attendance	Source
September 26	DePaul*	Memorial Stadium; Champaign, IL	W 9–6	16,589	
October 3	Washington University*	Memorial Stadium; Champaign, IL	W 13–7	20,568	
October 10	USC*	Memorial Stadium; Champaign, IL	L 6–24	33,325	
October 17	at Iowa	Iowa Stadium; Iowa City, IA	T 0–0	39,000	
October 24	No. 4 Northwestern	Memorial Stadium; Champaign, IL (rivalry)	L 2–13	30,579	
October 31	at Michigan	Michigan Stadium; Ann Arbor, MI (rivalry)	W 9–6	29,901	
November 14	Ohio State	Memorial Stadium; Champaign, IL (Illibuck)	L 0–13	19,465	
November 21	at Chicago	Stagg Field; Chicago, IL	W 18–7	15,000	
*Non-conference game; Rankings from AP Poll released prior to the game
