= 1936 Indiana Hoosiers football team =

American college football season

1936 Indiana Hoosiers football
- Conference: Big Ten Conference
- Record: 5–2–1 (3–1–1 Big Ten)
- Head coach: Bo McMillin (3rd season)
- MVP: Vern Huffman
- Captain: Chris Dal Sasso
- Home stadium: Memorial Stadium

1936 Big Ten Conference football standings
	Conf.					Overall
Team	W		L		T	W		L		T
No. 7 Northwestern $	6	–	0	–	0	7	–	1	–	0
No. 1 Minnesota	4	–	1	–	0	7	–	1	–	0
Ohio State	4	–	1	–	0	5	–	3	–	0
Indiana	3	–	1	–	1	5	–	2	–	1
Purdue	3	–	1	–	1	5	–	2	–	1
Illinois	2	–	2	–	1	4	–	3	–	1
Chicago	1	–	4	–	0	2	–	5	–	1
Iowa	0	–	4	–	1	3	–	4	–	1
Wisconsin	0	–	4	–	0	2	–	6	–	0
Michigan	0	–	5	–	0	1	–	7	–	0
$ – Conference champion; Rankings from AP Poll

The 1936 Indiana Hoosiers football team represented the Indiana Hoosiers in the 1936 college football season. The participated as members of the Big Ten Conference. The Hoosiers played their home games at Memorial Stadium in Bloomington, Indiana. The team was coached by Bo McMillin, in his third year as head coach of the Hoosiers.

== Schedule ==
Date	Opponent	Site	Result	Attendance	Source
October 3	Centre*	Memorial Stadium; Bloomington, IN	W 38–0	14,000	
October 10	at Michigan	Michigan Stadium; Ann Arbor, MI	W 14–3	19,110	
October 17	at Nebraska*	Memorial Stadium; Lincoln, NE	L 9–13		
October 24	at Ohio State	Ohio Stadium; Columbus, OH	L 0–7	44,410	
October 31	Iowa	Memorial Stadium; Bloomington, IN	W 13–6		
November 7	Syracuse*	Memorial Stadium; Bloomington, IN	W 9–7		
November 14	at Chicago	Stagg Field; Chicago, IL	W 20–7	18,000	
November 21	at Purdue	Ross–Ade Stadium; West Lafayette, IN (Old Oaken Bucket)	T 20–20	30,000	
*Non-conference game

== 1937 NFL draftees ==
Player	Position	Round	Pick	NFL club
Vern Huffman	End	3	27	Detroit Lions
Chris Del Sasso	Tackle	2	14	Cleveland Rams
