= Roy Schoemann =

American football player (1914–1972)

Profile
- Position: Center

Personal information
- Born: August 30, 1914; Milwaukee, Wisconsin
- Died: May 10, 1972 (aged 57); Milwaukee, Wisconsin
- Listed height: 6 ft 1 in (1.85 m)
- Listed weight: 192 lb (87 kg)

Career information
- College: Marquette

Career history
- Green Bay Packers (1938)

Career statistics
- Games played: 3
- Stats at Pro Football Reference

Leroy Herbert Schoemann (August 30, 1914 – May 10, 1972), sometimes known by the nickname "Bunny", was a center in the National Football League. He played with the Green Bay Packers during the 1938 NFL season.
