= John Golemgeske =

American football player (1915–1958)

No. 17
- Positions: Tackle, guard

Personal information
- Born: November 14, 1915; Waukesha, Wisconsin, U.S.
- Died: December 22, 1958 (aged 43); Milwaukee, Wisconsin, U.S.
- Listed height: 6 ft 2 in (1.88 m)
- Listed weight: 225 lb (102 kg)

Career information
- High school: Waukesha High School
- College: Wisconsin
- NFL draft: 1937: 6th round, 53rd overall pick

Career history
- Brooklyn Dodgers (1937–1940)

Career NFL statistics
- Games played: 42
- Games started: 26
- Stats at Pro Football Reference

John William Golemgeske (November 14, 1915 – December 22, 1958) was an American professional football offensive lineman in the National Football League. He was drafted in the sixth round of the 1937 NFL Draft. He played four seasons for the Brooklyn Dodgers (1937 to 1940) as a tackle and guard. He played at the collegiate level at the University of Wisconsin–Madison. Golemgeske died at age 43 on December 22, 1958, in Milwaukee, Wisconsin, of a heart attack suffered the day before.
