= William T. Daly =

Playing career
- c. 1919: Holy Cross

Coaching career (HC unless noted)

Football
- 1921: St. Charles College
- 1922: Jesuit HS (LA)
- 1923–1925: Loyola (LA) (assistant)
- 1925–1930: Spring Hill
- 1935–1936: Spring Hill

William T. "Barb" Daly was an American football and baseball player and coach.

== Head coaching record ==
=== College ===
Year	Team	Overall	Conference	Standing	Bowl/playoffs
Spring Hill Badgers (Independent) (1925–1927)
1925	Spring Hill	4–4			
1926	Spring Hill	3–2–1			
1927	Spring Hill	6–1			
Spring Hill Badgers (Southern Intercollegiate Athletic Association) (1928–1930)
1928	Spring Hill	2–5–1	2–3–1	21st	
1929	Spring Hill	7–1	4–0	2nd	
1930	Spring Hill	6–2	4–0	3rd	
Spring Hill Badgers (Dixie Conference) (1935–1936)
1935	Spring Hill	7–2–2	2–1–2	3rd	
1936	Spring Hill	3–6	0–5	9th	
Spring Hill:		38–23–4			
Total:		38–23–4			
