= 1936 Western Kentucky State Teachers Hilltoppers football team =

American college football season

1936 Western Kentucky State Teachers Hilltoppers football

KIAC co-champion
- Conference: Kentucky Intercollegiate Athletic Conference, Southern Intercollegiate Athletic Association
- Record: 6–3 (2–0 KIAC, 3–2 SIAA)
- Head coach: Carl Anderson (4th season)

1936 Kentucky Intercollegiate Athletic Conference football standings
	Conf.					Overall
Team	W		L		T	W		L		T
Western Kentucky State Teachers +	2	–	0	–	0	7	–	2	–	0
Centre +	2	–	0	–	0	5	–	4	–	0
Morehead State	3	–	1	–	2	4	–	1	–	2
Eastern Kentucky	4	–	2	–	0	7	–	2	–	0
Murray State	2	–	1	–	0	5	–	4	–	0
Louisville	2	–	2	–	0	4	–	4	–	0
Georgetown (KY)	1	–	3	–	1	2	–	5	–	1
Transylvania	0	–	3	–	1	3	–	4	–	1
Union (KY)	0	–	3	–	2	2	–	4	–	2
+ – Conference co-champions

1936 Southern Intercollegiate Athletic Association football standings
	Conf.					Overall
Team	W		L		T	W		L		T
Middle Tennessee State Teachers +	4	–	0	–	0	7	–	1	–	0
The Citadel +	4	–	0	–	0	4	–	6	–	0
Miami (FL)	3	–	0	–	0	6	–	2	–	2
Centenary	2	–	0	–	0	6	–	4	–	2
Centre	2	–	0	–	0	5	–	4	–	0
Howard (AL)	2	–	0	–	1	5	–	3	–	1
Union (TN)	5	–	1	–	1	6	–	4	–	1
Rollins	4	–	1	–	0	7	–	1	–	0
Louisiana Tech	4	–	1	–	1	6	–	2	–	1
Morehead State	4	–	1	–	2	4	–	1	–	2
Eastern Kentucky	4	–	2	–	0	7	–	2	–	0
Mississippi State Teachers	4	–	2	–	1	7	–	2	–	1
Mississippi College	2	–	1	–	1	5	–	3	–	1
Western Kentucky State Teachers	3	–	2	–	0	6	–	3	–	0
Erskine	3	–	2	–	0	4	–	5	–	0
Presbyterian	3	–	2	–	0	3	–	6	–	0
Louisiana Normal	3	–	2	–	1	5	–	4	–	1
Murray State	4	–	4	–	0	5	–	4	–	0
Mercer	1	–	1	–	1	3	–	6	–	1
Louisiana College	2	–	3	–	1	3	–	4	–	1
Louisville	2	–	3	–	0	4	–	4	–	0
Millsaps	1	–	2	–	2	3	–	5	–	2
Transylvania	1	–	3	–	1	3	–	4	–	1
Tennessee Tech	1	–	5	–	0	2	–	5	–	1
Georgetown (KY)	1	–	5	–	1	2	–	5	–	1
Loyola (LA)	0	–	1	–	0	4	–	6	–	0
Stetson	0	–	3	–	1	2	–	5	–	1
Union (KY)	0	–	3	–	2	2	–	4	–	2
SW Louisiana	0	–	4	–	1	2	–	7	–	1
Wofford	0	–	4	–	1	1	–	7	–	1
Newberry	0	–	4	–	1	1	–	10	–	1
West Tennessee State Teachers	0	–	7	–	0	0	–	9	–	0
+ – Conference co-champions

The 1936 Western Kentucky State Teachers Hilltoppers football team represented Western Kentucky State Teachers College—now known as Western Kentucky University—as a member of the Kentucky Intercollegiate Athletic Conference (KIAC) and the Southern Intercollegiate Athletic Association (SIAA) during the 1936 college football season. Led by fourth-year head coach Carl Anderson, the Hilltoppers compiled an overall record of 6–3 with mark of 2–0 in KIAC play, sharing the conference title with Centre. Western Kentucky State Teachers went 3–2 against SIAA opponents.

== Schedule ==
Date	Opponent	Site	Result	Attendance	Source
September 26	West Liberty*	Bowling Green, KY	W 33–0		
October 3	Tennessee Tech	Bowling Green, KY	W 27–0		
October 9	at Xavier*	Cincinnati, OH	L 7–12	2,500	
October 17	Middle Tennessee State Teachers	Bowling Green, KY (rivalry)	L 0–9		
October 31	Oglethorpe*^{†}	Bowling Green, KY	W 6–0		
November 7	Howard (AL)	Bowling Green, KY	L 6–14		
November 14	at Eastern Kentucky	Richmond, KY (rivalry)	W 7–0		
November 21	at Murray State	Cutchin Stadium; Murray, KY (rivalry)	W 14–0		
December 5	Tampa*	Plant Field; Tampa, FL	W 23–20		
*Non-conference game; ^{†}Homecoming
