= 1936 Kent State Golden Flashes football team =

American college football season

1936 Kent State Golden Flashes football
- Conference: Ohio Athletic Conference
- Record: 4–4 (4–3 OAC)
- Head coach: Donald Starn (2nd season)
- Home stadium: Rockwell Field

1936 Ohio Athletic Conference football standings
	Conf.					Overall
Team	W		L		T	W		L		T
Marietta $	4	–	0	–	0	5	–	2	–	0
Baldwin–Wallace	3	–	0	–	0	7	–	1	–	0
Akron	5	–	1	–	1	6	–	2	–	1
Mount Union	4	–	1	–	1	7	–	1	–	1
Case	4	–	1	–	0	5	–	4	–	0
Muskingum	6	–	2	–	0	6	–	3	–	0
Ohio Northern	4	–	2	–	2	4	–	2	–	2
Bowling Green	2	–	1	–	3	4	–	2	–	3
Wittenberg	4	–	2	–	0	4	–	5	–	0
Capital	3	–	2	–	1	4	–	2	–	1
Kent State	4	–	3	–	0	5	–	4	–	0
Toledo	2	–	2	–	0	2	–	6	–	0
Heidelberg	3	–	4	–	1	3	–	4	–	1
Denison	2	–	3	–	1	2	–	4	–	1
Wooster	3	–	5	–	0	3	–	6	–	0
Kenyon	1	–	3	–	0	3	–	4	–	0
Ashland	2	–	6	–	0	2	–	6	–	0
Oberlin	1	–	4	–	0	3	–	5	–	0
John Carroll	1	–	4	–	0	2	–	7	–	0
Findlay	0	–	5	–	0	0	–	7	–	0
Otterbein	0	–	7	–	0	1	–	7	–	0
$ – Conference champion

The 1936 Kent State Golden Flashes football team was an American football team that represented Kent State University in the Ohio Athletic Conference (OAC) during the 1936 college football season. In its second season under head coach Donald Starn, Kent State compiled a 4–4 record.

== Schedule ==
Date	Opponent	Site	Result	Attendance	Source
September 25	at John Carroll	Cleveland, OH	W 34–7		
October 3	Heidelberg	Rockwell Field; Kent, OH	L 0–19		
October 9	at Akron	Buchtel Field; Akron, OH (rivalry)	L 0–6	6,000	
October 17	at Ohio*	Ohio Stadium; Athens, OH	L 0–6		
October 24	at Bowling Green	Bowling Green, OH (rivalry)	W 6–0		
October 30	at Findlay	Findlay, OH	W 19–0		
November 7	Marietta	Rockwell Field; Kent, OH	L 12–14		
November 14	Ashland	Rockwell Field; Kent, OH	W 14–7		
*Non-conference game
