= 1936 Southwestern Lynx football team =

American college football season

1936 Southwestern Lynx football
- Conference: Dixie Conference
- Record: 7–2–1 (3–1–1 Dixie)
- Head coach: Clyde Propst (2nd season)
- Home stadium: Crump Stadium

1936 Dixie Conference football standings
	Conf.					Overall
Team	W		L		T	W		L		T
Howard (AL) $	4	–	1	–	1	5	–	3	–	1
Southwestern (TN)	3	–	1	–	1	7	–	2	–	1
Chattanooga	3	–	1	–	1	5	–	2	–	1
Birmingham–Southern	4	–	3	–	0	4	–	5	–	0
Mississippi College	2	–	2	–	0	5	–	3	–	1
Loyola (LA)	2	–	2	–	0	4	–	6	–	0
Millsaps	2	–	3	–	0	3	–	5	–	2
Mercer	0	–	2	–	1	3	–	6	–	1
Spring Hill	0	–	5	–	0	3	–	6	–	0
$ – Conference champion

The 1936 Southwestern Lynx football team was an American football team that represented Southwestern, The College of the Mississippi Valley (now known as Rhodes College) as a member of the Dixie Conference in the 1936 college football season. Led by Clyde Propst in his second season as head coach, the team compiled an overall record of 7–2–1, with a mark of 3–1–1 in conference play, and finished tied for second in the Dixie.

== Schedule ==
Date	Time	Opponent	Site	Result	Attendance	Source
September 19		at Arkansas State*	Kays Field; Jonesboro, AR	W 44–0		
September 25		Union (TN)*	Crump Stadium; Memphis, TN	W 32–3	5,500	
October 3		Millsaps	Crump Stadium; Memphis, TN	W 26–0		
October 10		at Vanderbilt*	Dudley Field; Nashville, TN	W 12–0	5,000	
October 16		at Chattanooga	Chamberlain Field; Chattanooga, TN	T 0–0		
October 24		Hendrix*	Crump Stadium; Memphis, TN	W 14–0	5,000	
October 31		at Howard (AL)	Legion Field; Birmingham, AL	L 0–6	3,000	
November 7		Birmingham–Southern	Crump Stadium; Memphis, TN	W 44–7	5,000	
November 13		Loyola (LA)	Crump Stadium; Memphis, TN	W 28–0		
November 21	1:45 p.m.	at Centre*	Farris Stadium; Danville, KY	L 6–20	1,000	
*Non-conference game; All times are in Central time
