= 1936 West Tennessee State Teachers football team =

American college football season

1936 West Tennessee State Teachers football
- Conference: Southern Intercollegiate Athletic Association
- Record: 0–9 (0–7 SIAA)
- Head coach: Zach Curlin (13th season)
- Captain: Christian Pontius
- Home stadium: Memorial Field

1936 Southern Intercollegiate Athletic Association football standings
	Conf.					Overall
Team	W		L		T	W		L		T
Middle Tennessee State Teachers +	4	–	0	–	0	7	–	1	–	0
The Citadel +	4	–	0	–	0	4	–	6	–	0
Miami (FL)	3	–	0	–	0	6	–	2	–	2
Centenary	2	–	0	–	0	6	–	4	–	2
Centre	2	–	0	–	0	5	–	4	–	0
Howard (AL)	2	–	0	–	1	5	–	3	–	1
Union (TN)	5	–	1	–	1	6	–	4	–	1
Rollins	4	–	1	–	0	7	–	1	–	0
Louisiana Tech	4	–	1	–	1	6	–	2	–	1
Morehead State	4	–	1	–	2	4	–	1	–	2
Eastern Kentucky	4	–	2	–	0	7	–	2	–	0
Mississippi State Teachers	4	–	2	–	1	7	–	2	–	1
Mississippi College	2	–	1	–	1	5	–	3	–	1
Western Kentucky State Teachers	3	–	2	–	0	6	–	3	–	0
Erskine	3	–	2	–	0	4	–	5	–	0
Presbyterian	3	–	2	–	0	3	–	6	–	0
Louisiana Normal	3	–	2	–	1	5	–	4	–	1
Murray State	4	–	4	–	0	5	–	4	–	0
Mercer	1	–	1	–	1	3	–	6	–	1
Louisiana College	2	–	3	–	1	3	–	4	–	1
Louisville	2	–	3	–	0	4	–	4	–	0
Millsaps	1	–	2	–	2	3	–	5	–	2
Transylvania	1	–	3	–	1	3	–	4	–	1
Tennessee Tech	1	–	5	–	0	2	–	5	–	1
Georgetown (KY)	1	–	5	–	1	2	–	5	–	1
Loyola (LA)	0	–	1	–	0	4	–	6	–	0
Stetson	0	–	3	–	1	2	–	5	–	1
Union (KY)	0	–	3	–	2	2	–	4	–	2
SW Louisiana	0	–	4	–	1	2	–	7	–	1
Wofford	0	–	4	–	1	1	–	7	–	1
Newberry	0	–	4	–	1	1	–	10	–	1
West Tennessee State Teachers	0	–	7	–	0	0	–	9	–	0
+ – Conference co-champions

The 1936 West Tennessee State Teachers football team was an American football team that represented the West Tennessee State Teachers College (now known as the University of Memphis) as a member of the Southern Intercollegiate Athletic Association during the 1936 college football season. In their thirteenth season under head coach Zach Curlin, West Tennessee State Teachers compiled an 0–9 record.

== Schedule ==
Date	Time	Opponent	Site	Result	Attendance	Source
September 26		at Delta State*	Delta Field; Cleveland, MS	L 7–33		
October 2		at Louisiana Tech	Tech Stadium; Ruston, LA	L 0–44	3,500	
October 9		at Tennessee Tech	Overhill Field; Cookeville, TN	L 0–25		
October 17	2:00 p.m.	Louisiana College^{†}	Memorial Field; Memphis, TN	L 0–12		
October 23		at Mississippi State Teachers	Faulkner Field; Hattiesburg, MS (rivalry)	L 0–25		
October 31		Middle Tennessee State Teachers	Memorial Field; Memphis, TN	L 0–19		
November 7		Murray State	Memorial Field; Memphis, TN	L 6–20		
November 14		at Arkansas State Teachers*	Conway, AR	L 0–54		
November 21		Union (TN)	Memorial Field; Memphis, TN	L 0–50		
*Non-conference game; ^{†}Homecoming; All times are in Central time
