= 1936 Louisville Cardinals football team =

American college football season

1936 Louisville Cardinals football
- Conference: Kentucky Intercollegiate Athletic Conference, Southern Intercollegiate Athletic Association
- Record: 4–4 (2–2 KIAC, 2–3 SIAA)
- Head coach: Laurie Apitz (1st season)
- Home stadium: Parkway Field

1936 Kentucky Intercollegiate Athletic Conference football standings
	Conf.					Overall
Team	W		L		T	W		L		T
Western Kentucky State Teachers +	2	–	0	–	0	7	–	2	–	0
Centre +	2	–	0	–	0	5	–	4	–	0
Morehead State	3	–	1	–	2	4	–	1	–	2
Eastern Kentucky	4	–	2	–	0	7	–	2	–	0
Murray State	2	–	1	–	0	5	–	4	–	0
Louisville	2	–	2	–	0	4	–	4	–	0
Georgetown (KY)	1	–	3	–	1	2	–	5	–	1
Transylvania	0	–	3	–	1	3	–	4	–	1
Union (KY)	0	–	3	–	2	2	–	4	–	2
+ – Conference co-champions

1936 Southern Intercollegiate Athletic Association football standings
	Conf.					Overall
Team	W		L		T	W		L		T
Middle Tennessee State Teachers +	4	–	0	–	0	7	–	1	–	0
The Citadel +	4	–	0	–	0	4	–	6	–	0
Miami (FL)	3	–	0	–	0	6	–	2	–	2
Centenary	2	–	0	–	0	6	–	4	–	2
Centre	2	–	0	–	0	5	–	4	–	0
Howard (AL)	2	–	0	–	1	5	–	3	–	1
Union (TN)	5	–	1	–	1	6	–	4	–	1
Rollins	4	–	1	–	0	7	–	1	–	0
Louisiana Tech	4	–	1	–	1	6	–	2	–	1
Morehead State	4	–	1	–	2	4	–	1	–	2
Eastern Kentucky	4	–	2	–	0	7	–	2	–	0
Mississippi State Teachers	4	–	2	–	1	7	–	2	–	1
Mississippi College	2	–	1	–	1	5	–	3	–	1
Western Kentucky State Teachers	3	–	2	–	0	6	–	3	–	0
Erskine	3	–	2	–	0	4	–	5	–	0
Presbyterian	3	–	2	–	0	3	–	6	–	0
Louisiana Normal	3	–	2	–	1	5	–	4	–	1
Murray State	4	–	4	–	0	5	–	4	–	0
Mercer	1	–	1	–	1	3	–	6	–	1
Louisiana College	2	–	3	–	1	3	–	4	–	1
Louisville	2	–	3	–	0	4	–	4	–	0
Millsaps	1	–	2	–	2	3	–	5	–	2
Transylvania	1	–	3	–	1	3	–	4	–	1
Tennessee Tech	1	–	5	–	0	2	–	5	–	1
Georgetown (KY)	1	–	5	–	1	2	–	5	–	1
Loyola (LA)	0	–	1	–	0	4	–	6	–	0
Stetson	0	–	3	–	1	2	–	5	–	1
Union (KY)	0	–	3	–	2	2	–	4	–	2
SW Louisiana	0	–	4	–	1	2	–	7	–	1
Wofford	0	–	4	–	1	1	–	7	–	1
Newberry	0	–	4	–	1	1	–	10	–	1
West Tennessee State Teachers	0	–	7	–	0	0	–	9	–	0
+ – Conference co-champions

The 1936 Louisville Cardinals football team was an American football team that represented the University of Louisville s a member of the Kentucky Intercollegiate Athletic Conference (KIAC) and the Southern Intercollegiate Athletic Association (SIAA) during the 1936 college football season. In their first season under head coach Laurie Apitz, the Cardinals compiled an overall record of 4–4 with mark of 2–2 in KIAC and play and 2–3 against SIAA opponents.

== Schedule ==
Date	Opponent	Site	Result	Attendance	Source
October 3	Union (KY)	Louisville, KY	W 13–0		
October 10	at Hanover*	Hanover, IN	W 12–2		
October 17	at Eastern Kentucky	Richmond, KY	L 6–9		
October 24	at Union (TN)	Jackson, TN	L 7–27		
October 30	Georgetown (KY)	Louisville, KY	W 12–8		
November 7	Alfred Holbrook*	Louisville, KY	W 31–7		
November 14	at Morehead State	Morehead, KY	L 7–14		
November 21	Baldwin–Wallace*	Parkway Field; Louisville, KY	L 0–67	2,900	
*Non-conference game
