= 1936 Spring Hill Badgers football team =

American college football season

1936 Spring Hill Badgers football
- Conference: Dixie Conference
- Record: 3–6 (0–5 Dixie)
- Head coach: William T. Daly (8th season)

1936 Dixie Conference football standings
| | Conf. | | | | | Overall |
| Team | W | | L | | T | W | | L | | T |
|---|---|---|---|---|---|---|---|---|---|---|
| Howard (AL) $ | 4 | – | 1 | – | 1 | 5 | – | 3 | – | 1 |
| Southwestern (TN) | 3 | – | 1 | – | 1 | 7 | – | 2 | – | 1 |
| Chattanooga | 3 | – | 1 | – | 1 | 5 | – | 2 | – | 1 |
| Birmingham–Southern | 4 | – | 3 | – | 0 | 4 | – | 5 | – | 0 |
| Mississippi College | 2 | – | 2 | – | 0 | 5 | – | 3 | – | 1 |
| Loyola (LA) | 2 | – | 2 | – | 0 | 4 | – | 6 | – | 0 |
| Millsaps | 2 | – | 3 | – | 0 | 3 | – | 5 | – | 2 |
| Mercer | 0 | – | 2 | – | 1 | 3 | – | 6 | – | 1 |
| Spring Hill | 0 | – | 5 | – | 0 | 3 | – | 6 | – | 0 |
$ – Conference champion

The 1936 Spring Hill Badgers football team was an American football team that represented Spring Hill College as a member of the Dixie Conference during the 1936 college football season. In their eighth year under head coach William T. Daly, the team compiled a 3–6 record.

== Schedule ==
| Date | Opponent | Site | Result | Attendance | Source |
|---|---|---|---|---|---|
| September 18 | Troy State* | Dorn Stadium; Mobile, AL | W 13–0 | | |
| September 25 | at Loyola (LA) | Loyola University Stadium; New Orleans, LA | L 0–33 | 8,000 | |
| October 10 | at Mississippi College | Municipal Stadium; Jackson, MS | L 7–28 | | |
| October 16 | Southwestern Louisiana* | Dorn Stadium; Mobile, AL | W 6–0 | | |
| October 23 | Howard (AL) | Dorn Stadium; Mobile, AL | L 0–20 | | |
| October 29 | at Mississippi State Teachers* | Faulkner Field; Hattiesburg, MS | L 7–12 | | |
| November 5 | Millsaps | Dorn Stadium; Mobile, AL | L 0–3 | | |
| November 13 | Birmingham–Southern | Dorn Stadium; Mobile, AL | L 0–13 | | |
| November 26 | Union (TN)* | Dorn Stadium; Mobile, AL | W 7–0 | | |
*Non-conference game
