= 1936 Bowling Green Falcons football team =

American college football season

1936 Bowling Green Falcons football
- Conference: Ohio Athletic Conference
- Record: 4–2–3 (2–1–3 OAC)
- Head coach: Harry Ockerman (2nd season)
- Captain: James Inman

1936 Ohio Athletic Conference football standings
	Conf.					Overall
Team	W		L		T	W		L		T
Marietta $	4	–	0	–	0	5	–	2	–	0
Baldwin–Wallace	3	–	0	–	0	7	–	1	–	0
Akron	5	–	1	–	1	6	–	2	–	1
Mount Union	4	–	1	–	1	7	–	1	–	1
Case	4	–	1	–	0	5	–	4	–	0
Muskingum	6	–	2	–	0	6	–	3	–	0
Ohio Northern	4	–	2	–	2	4	–	2	–	2
Bowling Green	2	–	1	–	3	4	–	2	–	3
Wittenberg	4	–	2	–	0	4	–	5	–	0
Capital	3	–	2	–	1	4	–	2	–	1
Kent State	4	–	3	–	0	5	–	4	–	0
Toledo	2	–	2	–	0	2	–	6	–	0
Heidelberg	3	–	4	–	1	3	–	4	–	1
Denison	2	–	3	–	1	2	–	4	–	1
Wooster	3	–	5	–	0	3	–	6	–	0
Kenyon	1	–	3	–	0	3	–	4	–	0
Ashland	2	–	6	–	0	2	–	6	–	0
Oberlin	1	–	4	–	0	3	–	5	–	0
John Carroll	1	–	4	–	0	2	–	7	–	0
Findlay	0	–	5	–	0	0	–	7	–	0
Otterbein	0	–	7	–	0	1	–	7	–	0
$ – Conference champion

The 1936 Bowling Green Falcons football team was an American football team that represented Bowling Green State College (later renamed Bowling Green State University) in the Ohio Athletic Conference (OAC) during the 1936 college football season. In their second season under head coach Harry Ockerman, the Falcons compiled a 4–2–3 record (2–1–3 against OAC opponents), finished in 11th place out of 19 teams in the OAC, and outscored opponents by a total of 66 to 60. James Inman was the team captain.

== Schedule ==
Date	Opponent	Site	Result	Attendance	Source
September 26	vs. Western Reserve*	Massillon Field; Massillon, OH	L 0–40	3,000	
October 3	at Capital	Columbus, OH	T 7–7		
October 10	Michigan State Normal*	Bowling Green, OH	W 6–0		
October 17	at Wittenberg	Wittenberg Stadium; Springfield, OH	W 13–0		
October 24	Kent State	Bowling Green, OH (rivalry)	L 0–6	1,500	
October 31	at Hiram*	Hiram College Field; Hiram, OH	W 13–0		
November 7	at Ashland	Ashland, OH	W 20–0		
November 14	Ohio Northern	Bowling Green, OH	T 7–7		
November 20	Heidelberg	Bowling Green, OH	T 0–0		
*Non-conference game
