= 1936 Centre Colonels football team =

American college football season

1936 Centre Colonels football

KIAC champion
- Conference: Kentucky Intercollegiate Athletic Conference, Southern Intercollegiate Athletic Association
- Record: 5–4 (2–0 KIAC, 2–0 SIAA)
- Head coach: Ed Kubale (8th season)
- Home stadium: Farris Stadium

1936 Kentucky Intercollegiate Athletic Conference football standings
	Conf.					Overall
Team	W		L		T	W		L		T
Western Kentucky State Teachers +	2	–	0	–	0	7	–	2	–	0
Centre +	2	–	0	–	0	5	–	4	–	0
Morehead State	3	–	1	–	2	4	–	1	–	2
Eastern Kentucky	4	–	2	–	0	7	–	2	–	0
Murray State	2	–	1	–	0	5	–	4	–	0
Louisville	2	–	2	–	0	4	–	4	–	0
Georgetown (KY)	1	–	3	–	1	2	–	5	–	1
Transylvania	0	–	3	–	1	3	–	4	–	1
Union (KY)	0	–	3	–	2	2	–	4	–	2
+ – Conference co-champions

1936 Southern Intercollegiate Athletic Association football standings
	Conf.					Overall
Team	W		L		T	W		L		T
Middle Tennessee State Teachers +	4	–	0	–	0	7	–	1	–	0
The Citadel +	4	–	0	–	0	4	–	6	–	0
Miami (FL)	3	–	0	–	0	6	–	2	–	2
Centenary	2	–	0	–	0	6	–	4	–	2
Centre	2	–	0	–	0	5	–	4	–	0
Howard (AL)	2	–	0	–	1	5	–	3	–	1
Union (TN)	5	–	1	–	1	6	–	4	–	1
Rollins	4	–	1	–	0	7	–	1	–	0
Louisiana Tech	4	–	1	–	1	6	–	2	–	1
Morehead State	4	–	1	–	2	4	–	1	–	2
Eastern Kentucky	4	–	2	–	0	7	–	2	–	0
Mississippi State Teachers	4	–	2	–	1	7	–	2	–	1
Mississippi College	2	–	1	–	1	5	–	3	–	1
Western Kentucky State Teachers	3	–	2	–	0	6	–	3	–	0
Erskine	3	–	2	–	0	4	–	5	–	0
Presbyterian	3	–	2	–	0	3	–	6	–	0
Louisiana Normal	3	–	2	–	1	5	–	4	–	1
Murray State	4	–	4	–	0	5	–	4	–	0
Mercer	1	–	1	–	1	3	–	6	–	1
Louisiana College	2	–	3	–	1	3	–	4	–	1
Louisville	2	–	3	–	0	4	–	4	–	0
Millsaps	1	–	2	–	2	3	–	5	–	2
Transylvania	1	–	3	–	1	3	–	4	–	1
Tennessee Tech	1	–	5	–	0	2	–	5	–	1
Georgetown (KY)	1	–	5	–	1	2	–	5	–	1
Loyola (LA)	0	–	1	–	0	4	–	6	–	0
Stetson	0	–	3	–	1	2	–	5	–	1
Union (KY)	0	–	3	–	2	2	–	4	–	2
SW Louisiana	0	–	4	–	1	2	–	7	–	1
Wofford	0	–	4	–	1	1	–	7	–	1
Newberry	0	–	4	–	1	1	–	10	–	1
West Tennessee State Teachers	0	–	7	–	0	0	–	9	–	0
+ – Conference co-champions

The 1936 Centre Colonels football team represented Centre College as a member of the Kentucky Intercollegiate Athletic Conference (KIAC) and the Southern Intercollegiate Athletic Association (SIAA) during the 1936 college football season. Led by eighth-year head coach Ed Kubale, the Colonels compiled an overall record of 5–4 with a mark of 2–0 in KIAC play, sharing the conference title with Western Kentucky State Teachers. Centre had a record of 2–0 in SIAA play. The team played home games at Farris Stadium in Danville, Kentucky.

== Schedule ==
Date	Time	Opponent	Site	Result	Attendance	Source
September 25	7:45 p.m.	at Temple*	Temple Stadium; Philadelphia, PA	L 7–50	15,000	
October 3		at Indiana*	Memorial Stadium; Bloomington, IN	L 0–38	14,000	
October 10	2:00 p.m.	Transylvania	Farris Stadium; Danville, KY	W 12–0		
October 17	2:00 p.m.	Birmingham–Southern*^{†}	Farris Stadium; Danville, KY	W 13–0	2,000	
October 24	2:00 p.m.	vs. West Virginia*	duPont Stadium; Louisville, KY	L 13–26	6,000	
October 31	1:30 p.m.	at Xavier*	Corcoran Field; Cincinnati, OH	W 26–12	3,000	
November 7		at Georgetown (KY)	Hinton Field; Georgetown, KY	W 18–0	2,000	
November 14	1:30 p.m.	vs. Davidson*	American Legion Memorial Stadium; Charlotte, NC	L 0–27	5,000	
November 21	1:45 p.m.	Southwestern (TN)*	Farris Stadium; Danville, KY	W 20–6	1,000	
*Non-conference game; ^{†}Homecoming; All times are in Central time
