= 1936 Akron Zippers football team =

American college football season

1936 Akron Zippers football
- Conference: Ohio Athletic Conference
- Record: 6–2–1 (5–1–1 OAC)
- Head coach: Jim Aiken (1st season)
- Captains: Mike Krino; Bob Bauer; Ernie Kaufman
- Home stadium: Buchtel Field

1936 Ohio Athletic Conference football standings
	Conf.					Overall
Team	W		L		T	W		L		T
Marietta $	4	–	0	–	0	5	–	2	–	0
Baldwin–Wallace	3	–	0	–	0	7	–	1	–	0
Akron	5	–	1	–	1	6	–	2	–	1
Mount Union	4	–	1	–	1	7	–	1	–	1
Case	4	–	1	–	0	5	–	4	–	0
Muskingum	6	–	2	–	0	6	–	3	–	0
Ohio Northern	4	–	2	–	2	4	–	2	–	2
Bowling Green	2	–	1	–	3	4	–	2	–	3
Wittenberg	4	–	2	–	0	4	–	5	–	0
Capital	3	–	2	–	1	4	–	2	–	1
Kent State	4	–	3	–	0	5	–	4	–	0
Toledo	2	–	2	–	0	2	–	6	–	0
Heidelberg	3	–	4	–	1	3	–	4	–	1
Denison	2	–	3	–	1	2	–	4	–	1
Wooster	3	–	5	–	0	3	–	6	–	0
Kenyon	1	–	3	–	0	3	–	4	–	0
Ashland	2	–	6	–	0	2	–	6	–	0
Oberlin	1	–	4	–	0	3	–	5	–	0
John Carroll	1	–	4	–	0	2	–	7	–	0
Findlay	0	–	5	–	0	0	–	7	–	0
Otterbein	0	–	7	–	0	1	–	7	–	0
$ – Conference champion

The 1936 Akron Zippers football team was an American football team that represented the University of Akron as a member of the Ohio Athletic Conference (OAC) during the 1936 college football season. In their first season under head coach Jim Aiken, the Zippers compiled an overall record of 6–2–1 with a mark of 5–1–1 in conference play, placing third in the OAC, and outscored opponents by a total of 150 to 87. Mike Krino, Bob Bauer, and Ernie Kaufman were the team captains.

== Schedule ==
Date	Opponent	Site	Result	Attendance	Source
September 26	Detroit Tech*	Buchtel Field; Akron, OH	W 33–0	10,000	
October 3	Western Reserve*	Buchtel Field; Akron, OH	L 0–14	9,600	
October 9	Kent State	Buchtel Field; Akron, OH (rivalry)	W 6–0	6,000	
October 17	at Wooster	Wooster, OH	W 14–0		
October 23	at Muskingum	McConagha Stadium; New Concord, OH	W 18–6	5,000	
October 31	John Carroll	Buchtel Field; Akron, OH	W 33–7		
November 7	Heidelberg	Buchtel Field; Akron, OH	W 25–0		
November 14	at Baldwin–Wallace	Berea, OH	L 7–46	6,000	
November 21	Mount Union	Buchtel Field; Akron, OH	T 14–14		
*Non-conference game
