= 1936 Loyola Wolf Pack football team =

American college football season

1936 Loyola Wolf Pack football
- Conference: Dixie Conference, Southern Intercollegiate Athletic Association
- Record: 4–6 (2–2 Dixie, 0–1 SIAA)
- Head coach: Eddie Reed (3rd season)
- Home stadium: Loyola University Stadium

1936 Dixie Conference football standings
	Conf.					Overall
Team	W		L		T	W		L		T
Howard (AL) $	4	–	1	–	1	5	–	3	–	1
Southwestern (TN)	3	–	1	–	1	7	–	2	–	1
Chattanooga	3	–	1	–	1	5	–	2	–	1
Birmingham–Southern	4	–	3	–	0	4	–	5	–	0
Mississippi College	2	–	2	–	0	5	–	3	–	1
Loyola (LA)	2	–	2	–	0	4	–	6	–	0
Millsaps	2	–	3	–	0	3	–	5	–	2
Mercer	0	–	2	–	1	3	–	6	–	1
Spring Hill	0	–	5	–	0	3	–	6	–	0
$ – Conference champion

1936 Southern Intercollegiate Athletic Association football standings
	Conf.					Overall
Team	W		L		T	W		L		T
Middle Tennessee State Teachers +	4	–	0	–	0	7	–	1	–	0
The Citadel +	4	–	0	–	0	4	–	6	–	0
Miami (FL)	3	–	0	–	0	6	–	2	–	2
Centenary	2	–	0	–	0	6	–	4	–	2
Centre	2	–	0	–	0	5	–	4	–	0
Howard (AL)	2	–	0	–	1	5	–	3	–	1
Union (TN)	5	–	1	–	1	6	–	4	–	1
Rollins	4	–	1	–	0	7	–	1	–	0
Louisiana Tech	4	–	1	–	1	6	–	2	–	1
Morehead State	4	–	1	–	2	4	–	1	–	2
Eastern Kentucky	4	–	2	–	0	7	–	2	–	0
Mississippi State Teachers	4	–	2	–	1	7	–	2	–	1
Mississippi College	2	–	1	–	1	5	–	3	–	1
Western Kentucky State Teachers	3	–	2	–	0	6	–	3	–	0
Erskine	3	–	2	–	0	4	–	5	–	0
Presbyterian	3	–	2	–	0	3	–	6	–	0
Louisiana Normal	3	–	2	–	1	5	–	4	–	1
Murray State	4	–	4	–	0	5	–	4	–	0
Mercer	1	–	1	–	1	3	–	6	–	1
Louisiana College	2	–	3	–	1	3	–	4	–	1
Louisville	2	–	3	–	0	4	–	4	–	0
Millsaps	1	–	2	–	2	3	–	5	–	2
Transylvania	1	–	3	–	1	3	–	4	–	1
Tennessee Tech	1	–	5	–	0	2	–	5	–	1
Georgetown (KY)	1	–	5	–	1	2	–	5	–	1
Loyola (LA)	0	–	1	–	0	4	–	6	–	0
Stetson	0	–	3	–	1	2	–	5	–	1
Union (KY)	0	–	3	–	2	2	–	4	–	2
SW Louisiana	0	–	4	–	1	2	–	7	–	1
Wofford	0	–	4	–	1	1	–	7	–	1
Newberry	0	–	4	–	1	1	–	10	–	1
West Tennessee State Teachers	0	–	7	–	0	0	–	9	–	0
+ – Conference co-champions

The 1936 Loyola Wolf Pack football team was an American football team that represented Loyola College of New Orleans (now known as Loyola University New Orleans) as a member of the Dixie Conference and the Southern Intercollegiate Athletic Association (SIAA) during the 1936 college football season. In its third season under head coach Eddie Reed, the team compiled a 4–6 record and was outscored by a total of 171 to 78. The team played its home games at Loyola University Stadium in New Orleans.

== Schedule ==
Date	Opponent	Site	Result	Attendance	Source
September 25	Spring Hill	Loyola University Stadium; New Orleans, LA	W 33–0	8,000	
October 2	Birmingham–Southern	Loyola University Stadium; New Orleans, LA	W 13–6	5,000	
October 9	Howard (AL)	Loyola University Stadium; New Orleans, LA	L 6–14		
October 17	at Mississippi State*	Ray Stadium; Meridian, MS	L 0–32	6,000	
October 24	Alabama*	Loyola University Stadium; New Orleans, LA	L 6–13	7,000	
October 30	Catholic University*	Loyola University Stadium; New Orleans, LA	W 6–0		
November 7	at Ole Miss*	Hemingway Stadium; Oxford, MS	L 0–34		
November 13	at Southwestern (TN)	Crump Stadium; Memphis, TN	L 0–28		
November 21	at Auburn*	Drake Field; Auburn, AL	L 0–44	5,000	
November 26	Texas Tech*	Loyola University Stadium; New Orleans, LA	W 13–0	5,000	
*Non-conference game
