= 1936 Baldwin–Wallace Yellow Jackets football team =

American college football season

1936 Baldwin–Wallace Yellow Jackets football
- Conference: Ohio Athletic Conference
- Record: 7–1 (3–0 OAC)
- Head coach: Ray E. Watts (9th season)

1936 Ohio Athletic Conference football standings
	Conf.					Overall
Team	W		L		T	W		L		T
Marietta $	4	–	0	–	0	5	–	2	–	0
Baldwin–Wallace	3	–	0	–	0	7	–	1	–	0
Akron	5	–	1	–	1	6	–	2	–	1
Mount Union	4	–	1	–	1	7	–	1	–	1
Case	4	–	1	–	0	5	–	4	–	0
Muskingum	6	–	2	–	0	6	–	3	–	0
Ohio Northern	4	–	2	–	2	4	–	2	–	2
Bowling Green	2	–	1	–	3	4	–	2	–	3
Wittenberg	4	–	2	–	0	4	–	5	–	0
Capital	3	–	2	–	1	4	–	2	–	1
Kent State	4	–	3	–	0	5	–	4	–	0
Toledo	2	–	2	–	0	2	–	6	–	0
Heidelberg	3	–	4	–	1	3	–	4	–	1
Denison	2	–	3	–	1	2	–	4	–	1
Wooster	3	–	5	–	0	3	–	6	–	0
Kenyon	1	–	3	–	0	3	–	4	–	0
Ashland	2	–	6	–	0	2	–	6	–	0
Oberlin	1	–	4	–	0	3	–	5	–	0
John Carroll	1	–	4	–	0	2	–	7	–	0
Findlay	0	–	5	–	0	0	–	7	–	0
Otterbein	0	–	7	–	0	1	–	7	–	0
$ – Conference champion

The 1936 Baldwin–Wallace Yellow Jackets football team was an American football team that represented Baldwin–Wallace University as a member of the Ohio Athletic Conference (OAC) during the 1936 college football season. In their ninth year under head coach Ray E. Watts, the Yellow Jackets compiled a 7–1 record (3–0 against conference opponents), finished in second place in the OAC, and outscored opponents by a total of 330 to 70. Baldwin–Wallace was ranked No. 18 in the final 1936 Litkenhous Ratings released in early January 1937.

Baldwin–Wallace's triple-threat halfback Norm Schoen led the nation with 117 points scored, including 31 points against Louisville. Four Baldwin–Wallace players earned first-team honors on the 1936 All-Ohio Conference football teams selected by the United Press (UP) or Associated Press (AP). The first-team honorees were: Norm Shoen at back (AP-1, UP-1); Kenneth Noble at back (AP-1, UP-1); William Krause at tackle (AP-1, UP-1); and end Bill Davidson (AP-1, UP-2). Schoen was named the honorary captain of the UP's All-Ohio Conference team.

== Schedule ==
Date	Opponent	Site	Result	Attendance	Source
September 26	Central Michigan*	Berea, OH	W 65–2		
October 2	John Carroll	Berea, OH	W 48–7		
October 10	at Syracuse*	Archbold Stadium; Syracuse, NY	W 19–0	12,000	
October 17	at Western Reserve*	League Park; Cleveland, OH	L 6–20	18,000	
October 31	at Case	Cleveland, OH	W 13–12		
November 7	Wayne*	Berea, OH	W 66–20	4,000	
November 14	Akron	Berea, OH	W 46–7	6,000	
November 21	at Louisville*	Parkway Field; Louisville, KY	W 67–0	2,900	
*Non-conference game
