= 1936 Rutgers Queensmen football team =

American college football season

1936 Rutgers Queensmen football
- Conference: Middle Three Conference
- Record: 1–6–1 (0–1 Middle Three)
- Head coach: J. Wilder Tasker (6th season)
- Captain: George Van Der Noot
- Home stadium: Neilson Field

1936 Middle Three Conference football standings
	Conf.					Overall
Team	W		L		T	W		L		T
Lehigh $	2	–	0	–	0	6	–	2	–	0
Rutgers	0	–	1	–	0	1	–	6	–	1
Lafayette	0	–	1	–	0	1	–	8	–	0
$ – Conference champion

The 1936 Rutgers Queensmen football team represented Rutgers University in the 1936 college football season. In their sixth season under head coach J. Wilder Tasker, the Queensmen compiled a 1–6–1 record and were outscored by their opponents 133 to 20.

== Schedule ==
Date	Opponent	Site	Result	Attendance	Source
October 3	Marietta	Neilson Field; New Brunswick, NJ	W 13–0		
October 10	at Princeton	Palmer Stadium; Princeton, NJ (rivalry)	L 0–20	16,000	
October 17	Springfield	Neilson Field; New Brunswick, NJ	L 0–6		
October 24	at No. 10 Yale	Yale Bowl; New Haven, CT	L 0–28		
October 31	Lehigh	Neilson Field; New Brunswick, NJ	L 0–19	7,000	
November 7	Boston University	Neilson Field; New Brunswick, NJ	L 0–7		
November 14	at NYU	Polo Grounds; New York, NY	L 0–46	6,000	
November 21	at Wesleyan	Andrus Field; Middletown, CT	T 7–7		
Rankings from Coaches' Poll released prior to the game
