= 1936 Birmingham–Southern Panthers football team =

American college football season

1936 Birmingham–Southern Panthers football
- Conference: Dixie Conference
- Record: 4–5 (4–3 Dixie)
- Head coach: Jenks Gillem (9th season)
- Home stadium: Legion Field

1936 Dixie Conference football standings
	Conf.					Overall
Team	W		L		T	W		L		T
Howard (AL) $	4	–	1	–	1	5	–	3	–	1
Southwestern (TN)	3	–	1	–	1	7	–	2	–	1
Chattanooga	3	–	1	–	1	5	–	2	–	1
Birmingham–Southern	4	–	3	–	0	4	–	5	–	0
Mississippi College	2	–	2	–	0	5	–	3	–	1
Loyola (LA)	2	–	2	–	0	4	–	6	–	0
Millsaps	2	–	3	–	0	3	–	5	–	2
Mercer	0	–	2	–	1	3	–	6	–	1
Spring Hill	0	–	5	–	0	3	–	6	–	0
$ – Conference champion

The 1936 Birmingham–Southern Panthers football team was an American football team that represented Birmingham–Southern College as a member of the Dixie Conference during the 1936 college football season. In their ninth season under head coach Jenks Gillem, the team compiled a 4–5 record.

== Schedule ==
Date	Time	Opponent	Site	Result	Attendance	Source
September 25		at Auburn*	Cramton Bowl; Montgomery, AL	L 0–45	12,000	
October 2		at Loyola (LA)	Loyola University Stadium; New Orleans, LA	L 6–13	5,000	
October 10		Mercer	Legion Field; Birmingham, AL	W 6–0	2,000	
October 17	2:00 p.m.	at Centre*	Farris Stadium; Danville, KY	L 0–13	2,000	
October 24		Chattanooga	Legion Field; Birmingham, AL	W 14–7		
October 30		Millsaps	Legion Field; Birmingham, AL	W 20–0		
November 7		at Southwestern (TN)	Crump Stadium; Memphis, TN	L 7–44	5,000	
November 13		at Spring Hill	Dorn Stadium; Mobile, AL	W 13–0		
November 21		vs. Howard (AL)	Legion Field; Birmingham, AL	L 0–13		
*Non-conference game; All times are in Central time
