= 1936 Lafayette Leopards football team =

American football club

1936 Lafayette Leopards football
- Conference: Middle Three Conference
- Record: 1–8 (0–1 Middle Three)
- Head coach: Ernie Nevers (1st season)
- Captain: Benjamin Snyder
- Home stadium: Fisher Field

1936 Middle Three Conference football standings
| | Conf. | | | | | Overall |
| Team | W | | L | | T | W | | L | | T |
|---|---|---|---|---|---|---|---|---|---|---|
| Lehigh $ | 2 | – | 0 | – | 0 | 6 | – | 2 | – | 0 |
| Rutgers | 0 | – | 1 | – | 0 | 1 | – | 6 | – | 1 |
| Lafayette | 0 | – | 1 | – | 0 | 1 | – | 8 | – | 0 |
$ – Conference champion

The 1936 Lafayette Leopards football team was an American football team that represented Lafayette College in the Middle Three Conference during the 1936 college football season. In its first and only season under head coach Ernie Nevers, the team compiled a 1–8 record. Benjamin Snyder was the team captain.

== Schedule ==
| Date | Opponent | Site | Result | Source |
|---|---|---|---|---|
| September 26 | at Muhlenberg* | Allentown, PA | L 6–19 | |
| October 3 | at Penn* | Franklin Field; Philadelphia, PA | L 0–35 | |
| October 10 | Gettysburg* | Fisher Stadium; Easton, PA | L 0–2 | |
| October 17 | Dickinson* | Fisher Stadium; Easton, PA | W 7–0 | |
| October 24 | at Colgate* | Whitnall Field; Hamilton, NY | L 0–41 | |
| October 31 | at NYU* | Yankee Stadium; Bronx, NY | L 0–46 | |
| November 7 | Washington & Jefferson* | Fisher Stadium; Easton, PA | L 6–31 | |
| November 14 | Moravian* | Fisher Stadium; Easton, PA | L 7–28 | |
| November 21 | Lehigh | Fisher Stadium; Easton, PA (rivalry) | L 0–18 | |
*Non-conference game
