= 1936 Howard Bulldogs football team =

American college football season

1936 Howard Bulldogs football

Dixie champion
- Conference: Dixie Conference, Southern Intercollegiate Athletic Association
- Record: 5–3–1 (4–1–1 Dixie, 2–0–1 SIAA)
- Head coach: Billy Bancroft (2nd season)
- Home stadium: Legion Field

1936 Dixie Conference football standings
	Conf.					Overall
Team	W		L		T	W		L		T
Howard (AL) $	4	–	1	–	1	5	–	3	–	1
Southwestern (TN)	3	–	1	–	1	7	–	2	–	1
Chattanooga	3	–	1	–	1	5	–	2	–	1
Birmingham–Southern	4	–	3	–	0	4	–	5	–	0
Mississippi College	2	–	2	–	0	5	–	3	–	1
Loyola (LA)	2	–	2	–	0	4	–	6	–	0
Millsaps	2	–	3	–	0	3	–	5	–	2
Mercer	0	–	2	–	1	3	–	6	–	1
Spring Hill	0	–	5	–	0	3	–	6	–	0
$ – Conference champion

1936 Southern Intercollegiate Athletic Association football standings
	Conf.					Overall
Team	W		L		T	W		L		T
Middle Tennessee State Teachers +	4	–	0	–	0	7	–	1	–	0
The Citadel +	4	–	0	–	0	4	–	6	–	0
Miami (FL)	3	–	0	–	0	6	–	2	–	2
Centenary	2	–	0	–	0	6	–	4	–	2
Centre	2	–	0	–	0	5	–	4	–	0
Howard (AL)	2	–	0	–	1	5	–	3	–	1
Union (TN)	5	–	1	–	1	6	–	4	–	1
Rollins	4	–	1	–	0	7	–	1	–	0
Louisiana Tech	4	–	1	–	1	6	–	2	–	1
Morehead State	4	–	1	–	2	4	–	1	–	2
Eastern Kentucky	4	–	2	–	0	7	–	2	–	0
Mississippi State Teachers	4	–	2	–	1	7	–	2	–	1
Mississippi College	2	–	1	–	1	5	–	3	–	1
Western Kentucky State Teachers	3	–	2	–	0	6	–	3	–	0
Erskine	3	–	2	–	0	4	–	5	–	0
Presbyterian	3	–	2	–	0	3	–	6	–	0
Louisiana Normal	3	–	2	–	1	5	–	4	–	1
Murray State	4	–	4	–	0	5	–	4	–	0
Mercer	1	–	1	–	1	3	–	6	–	1
Louisiana College	2	–	3	–	1	3	–	4	–	1
Louisville	2	–	3	–	0	4	–	4	–	0
Millsaps	1	–	2	–	2	3	–	5	–	2
Transylvania	1	–	3	–	1	3	–	4	–	1
Tennessee Tech	1	–	5	–	0	2	–	5	–	1
Georgetown (KY)	1	–	5	–	1	2	–	5	–	1
Loyola (LA)	0	–	1	–	0	4	–	6	–	0
Stetson	0	–	3	–	1	2	–	5	–	1
Union (KY)	0	–	3	–	2	2	–	4	–	2
SW Louisiana	0	–	4	–	1	2	–	7	–	1
Wofford	0	–	4	–	1	1	–	7	–	1
Newberry	0	–	4	–	1	1	–	10	–	1
West Tennessee State Teachers	0	–	7	–	0	0	–	9	–	0
+ – Conference co-champions

The 1936 Howard Bulldogs football team was an American football team that represented Howard College—now known as the Samford University—as a member of the Dixie Conference and the Southern Intercollegiate Athletic Association (SIAA) during the 1936 college football season. In their second year under head coach Billy Bancroft, the Bulldogs compiled an overall record of 5–3–1 with mark of 4–1–1 in Dixie Conference play, winning the conference title. Howard was 2–0–1 against SIAA opponents.

== Schedule ==
Date	Opponent	Site	Result	Attendance	Source
September 26	at Alabama*	Denny Stadium; Tuscaloosa, AL	L 0–34	8,000	
October 3	at Mississippi State*	Scott Field; Starkville, Mississippi	L 0–35		
October 9	at Loyola (LA)	Loyola University Stadium; New Orleans, LA	W 14–6		
October 17	at Mercer	Centennial Stadium; Macon, GA	T 0–0		
October 23	at Spring Hill	Dorn Stadium; Mobile, AL	W 20–0		
October 31	Southwestern (TN)	Legion Field; Birmingham, AL	W 6–0	3,000	
November 7	at Western Kentucky State Teachers	Western Stadium; Bowling Green, KY	W 14–6	4,000	
November 21	vs. Birmingham–Southern	Legion Field; Birmingham, AL	W 13–0	10,000	
November 26	at Chattanooga	Chamberlain Field; Chattanooga, TN	L 0–6	3,521	
*Non-conference game
