= 1936 Toledo Rockets football team =

American college football season

1936 Toledo Rockets football
- Conference: Ohio Athletic Conference
- Record: 2–6 (2–2 OAC)
- Head coach: Clarence Spears (1st season)
- Captains: Louis DiSalle; Clarence Palm
- Home stadium: Libbey High School

1936 Ohio Athletic Conference football standings
	Conf.					Overall
Team	W		L		T	W		L		T
Marietta $	4	–	0	–	0	5	–	2	–	0
Baldwin–Wallace	3	–	0	–	0	7	–	1	–	0
Akron	5	–	1	–	1	6	–	2	–	1
Mount Union	4	–	1	–	1	7	–	1	–	1
Case	4	–	1	–	0	5	–	4	–	0
Muskingum	6	–	2	–	0	6	–	3	–	0
Ohio Northern	4	–	2	–	2	4	–	2	–	2
Bowling Green	2	–	1	–	3	4	–	2	–	3
Wittenberg	4	–	2	–	0	4	–	5	–	0
Capital	3	–	2	–	1	4	–	2	–	1
Kent State	4	–	3	–	0	5	–	4	–	0
Toledo	2	–	2	–	0	2	–	6	–	0
Heidelberg	3	–	4	–	1	3	–	4	–	1
Denison	2	–	3	–	1	2	–	4	–	1
Wooster	3	–	5	–	0	3	–	6	–	0
Kenyon	1	–	3	–	0	3	–	4	–	0
Ashland	2	–	6	–	0	2	–	6	–	0
Oberlin	1	–	4	–	0	3	–	5	–	0
John Carroll	1	–	4	–	0	2	–	7	–	0
Findlay	0	–	5	–	0	0	–	7	–	0
Otterbein	0	–	7	–	0	1	–	7	–	0
$ – Conference champion

The 1936 Toledo Rockets football team was an American football team that represented Toledo University in the Ohio Athletic Conference (OAC) during the 1936 college football season. In their first season under head coach Clarence Spears, the Rockets compiled a 2–6 record. While the university new football stadium was under construction, the team played its 1936 home games at Libbey High School.

== Schedule ==
Date	Opponent	Site	Result	Attendance	Source
October 3	Findlay	Libbey High School; Toledo, OH	W 32–0		
October 10	Boston University*	Libbey High School; Toledo, OH	L 0–6		
October 17	at Denison	Granville, OH	L 6–9		
October 24	Western Reserve*	Libbey High School; Toledo, OH	L 0–14		
October 31	Wayne*	Libbey High School; Toledo, OH	L 6–9		
November 7	at Miami (OH)*	Oxford, OH	L 0–13		
November 14	at Heidelberg	Tiffin, OH	L 0–7		
November 21	Otterbein	Libbey High School; Toledo, OH	W 50–0		
*Non-conference game
