= 1936 Louisiana Normal Demons football team =

American college football season

1936 Louisiana Normal Demons football
- Conference: Southern Intercollegiate Athletic Association
- Record: 5–4–1 (3–2–1 SIAA)
- Head coach: Harry Turpin (3rd season)
- Home stadium: Normal Field

1936 Southern Intercollegiate Athletic Association football standings
	Conf.					Overall
Team	W		L		T	W		L		T
Middle Tennessee State Teachers +	4	–	0	–	0	7	–	1	–	0
The Citadel +	4	–	0	–	0	4	–	6	–	0
Miami (FL)	3	–	0	–	0	6	–	2	–	2
Centenary	2	–	0	–	0	6	–	4	–	2
Centre	2	–	0	–	0	5	–	4	–	0
Howard (AL)	2	–	0	–	1	5	–	3	–	1
Union (TN)	5	–	1	–	1	6	–	4	–	1
Rollins	4	–	1	–	0	7	–	1	–	0
Louisiana Tech	4	–	1	–	1	6	–	2	–	1
Morehead State	4	–	1	–	2	4	–	1	–	2
Eastern Kentucky	4	–	2	–	0	7	–	2	–	0
Mississippi State Teachers	4	–	2	–	1	7	–	2	–	1
Mississippi College	2	–	1	–	1	5	–	3	–	1
Western Kentucky State Teachers	3	–	2	–	0	6	–	3	–	0
Erskine	3	–	2	–	0	4	–	5	–	0
Presbyterian	3	–	2	–	0	3	–	6	–	0
Louisiana Normal	3	–	2	–	1	5	–	4	–	1
Murray State	4	–	4	–	0	5	–	4	–	0
Mercer	1	–	1	–	1	3	–	6	–	1
Louisiana College	2	–	3	–	1	3	–	4	–	1
Louisville	2	–	3	–	0	4	–	4	–	0
Millsaps	1	–	2	–	2	3	–	5	–	2
Transylvania	1	–	3	–	1	3	–	4	–	1
Tennessee Tech	1	–	5	–	0	2	–	5	–	1
Georgetown (KY)	1	–	5	–	1	2	–	5	–	1
Loyola (LA)	0	–	1	–	0	4	–	6	–	0
Stetson	0	–	3	–	1	2	–	5	–	1
Union (KY)	0	–	3	–	2	2	–	4	–	2
SW Louisiana	0	–	4	–	1	2	–	7	–	1
Wofford	0	–	4	–	1	1	–	7	–	1
Newberry	0	–	4	–	1	1	–	10	–	1
West Tennessee State Teachers	0	–	7	–	0	0	–	9	–	0
+ – Conference co-champions

The 1936 Louisiana Normal Demons football team represented the Louisiana State Normal College (now known as Northwestern State University) as a member the Southern Intercollegiate Athletic Association (SIAA) during the 1936 college football season. Led by third-year head coach Harry Turpin, the Demons compiled an overall record of 5–4–1 with a mark of 3–2–1 in conference play.

== Schedule ==
Date	Opponent	Site	Result	Attendance	Source
September 19	at Centenary	Centenary Field; Shreveport, LA	L 0–20	4,000	
September 25	Southeastern Louisiana*	Normal Field; Natchitoches, LA (rivalry)	L 6–34		
October 2	at Magnolia A&M*	Columbia Stadium; Magnolia, AR	W 6–0		
October 9	at Louisiana College	Alumni Field; Pineville, LA	W 13–0		
October 16	at Millsaps	Alumni Field; Jackson, MS	T 0–0		
October 23	Louisiana Tech	Normal Field; Natchitoches, LA (rivalry)	L 0–32	4,000	
October 31	East Texas State*^{†}	Normal Field; Natchitoches, LA	L 0–20		
November 6	at Stephen F. Austin*	Birdwell Field; Nacogdoches, TX (rivalry)	W 20–7		
November 20	Mississippi State Teachers	Normal Field; Natchitoches, LA	W 13–0		
November 26	at Southwestern Louisiana	Campus Athletic Field; Lafayette, LA	W 6–0		
*Non-conference game; ^{†}Homecoming
