= 1936 Louisiana Tech Bulldogs football team =

American college football season

1936 Louisiana Tech Bulldogs football
- Conference: Southern Intercollegiate Athletic Association
- Record: 6–2–1 (4–1–1 SIAA)
- Head coach: Eddie McLane (3rd season)
- Captain: Bennie L. Phillip
- Home stadium: Tech Stadium

1936 Southern Intercollegiate Athletic Association football standings
	Conf.					Overall
Team	W		L		T	W		L		T
Middle Tennessee State Teachers +	4	–	0	–	0	7	–	1	–	0
The Citadel +	4	–	0	–	0	4	–	6	–	0
Miami (FL)	3	–	0	–	0	6	–	2	–	2
Centenary	2	–	0	–	0	6	–	4	–	2
Centre	2	–	0	–	0	5	–	4	–	0
Howard (AL)	2	–	0	–	1	5	–	3	–	1
Union (TN)	5	–	1	–	1	6	–	4	–	1
Rollins	4	–	1	–	0	7	–	1	–	0
Louisiana Tech	4	–	1	–	1	6	–	2	–	1
Morehead State	4	–	1	–	2	4	–	1	–	2
Eastern Kentucky	4	–	2	–	0	7	–	2	–	0
Mississippi State Teachers	4	–	2	–	1	7	–	2	–	1
Mississippi College	2	–	1	–	1	5	–	3	–	1
Western Kentucky State Teachers	3	–	2	–	0	6	–	3	–	0
Erskine	3	–	2	–	0	4	–	5	–	0
Presbyterian	3	–	2	–	0	3	–	6	–	0
Louisiana Normal	3	–	2	–	1	5	–	4	–	1
Murray State	4	–	4	–	0	5	–	4	–	0
Mercer	1	–	1	–	1	3	–	6	–	1
Louisiana College	2	–	3	–	1	3	–	4	–	1
Louisville	2	–	3	–	0	4	–	4	–	0
Millsaps	1	–	2	–	2	3	–	5	–	2
Transylvania	1	–	3	–	1	3	–	4	–	1
Tennessee Tech	1	–	5	–	0	2	–	5	–	1
Georgetown (KY)	1	–	5	–	1	2	–	5	–	1
Loyola (LA)	0	–	1	–	0	4	–	6	–	0
Stetson	0	–	3	–	1	2	–	5	–	1
Union (KY)	0	–	3	–	2	2	–	4	–	2
SW Louisiana	0	–	4	–	1	2	–	7	–	1
Wofford	0	–	4	–	1	1	–	7	–	1
Newberry	0	–	4	–	1	1	–	10	–	1
West Tennessee State Teachers	0	–	7	–	0	0	–	9	–	0
+ – Conference co-champions

The 1936 Louisiana Tech Bulldogs football team was an American football team that represented the Louisiana Polytechnic Institute (now known as Louisiana Tech University) as a member of the Southern Intercollegiate Athletic Association during the 1936 college football season. In their third year under head coach Eddie McLane, the team compiled a 6–2–1 record.

== Schedule ==
Date	Opponent	Site	Result	Attendance	Source
October 2	West Tennessee State	Tech Stadium; Ruston, LA	W 44–0	3,500	
October 8	at Southwestern Louisiana	Campus Athletic Field; Lafayette, LA (rivalry)	W 20–7		
October 16	Mississippi State Teachers	Tech Stadium; Ruston, LA (rivalry)	L 7–12		
October 23	at Louisiana Normal	Demon Field; Natchitoches, LA (rivalry)	W 32–0	4,000	
October 31	at No. 9 Tulane*	Tulane Stadium; New Orleans, LA	L 13–22	12,000	
November 6	Tampa*	Tech Stadium; Ruston, LA	W 6–0		
November 14	Millsaps^{†}	Tech Stadium; Ruston, LA	W 13–0	5,000	
November 20	Louisiana College	Tech Stadium; Ruston, LA	T 6–6	3,000	
November 26	Illinois Wesleyan*	Tech Stadium; Ruston, LA	W 12–0	3,000	
*Non-conference game; ^{†}Homecoming; Rankings from AP Poll released prior to the game
