= 1936 Miami Hurricanes football team =

American college football season

1936 Miami Hurricanes football
- Conference: Southern Intercollegiate Athletic Association
- Record: 6–2–2 (3–0 SIAA)
- Head coach: Irl Tubbs (2nd season)
- Home stadium: Miami Stadium

1936 Southern Intercollegiate Athletic Association football standings
	Conf.					Overall
Team	W		L		T	W		L		T
Middle Tennessee State Teachers +	4	–	0	–	0	7	–	1	–	0
The Citadel +	4	–	0	–	0	4	–	6	–	0
Miami (FL)	3	–	0	–	0	6	–	2	–	2
Centenary	2	–	0	–	0	6	–	4	–	2
Centre	2	–	0	–	0	5	–	4	–	0
Howard (AL)	2	–	0	–	1	5	–	3	–	1
Union (TN)	5	–	1	–	1	6	–	4	–	1
Rollins	4	–	1	–	0	7	–	1	–	0
Louisiana Tech	4	–	1	–	1	6	–	2	–	1
Morehead State	4	–	1	–	2	4	–	1	–	2
Eastern Kentucky	4	–	2	–	0	7	–	2	–	0
Mississippi State Teachers	4	–	2	–	1	7	–	2	–	1
Mississippi College	2	–	1	–	1	5	–	3	–	1
Western Kentucky State Teachers	3	–	2	–	0	6	–	3	–	0
Erskine	3	–	2	–	0	4	–	5	–	0
Presbyterian	3	–	2	–	0	3	–	6	–	0
Louisiana Normal	3	–	2	–	1	5	–	4	–	1
Murray State	4	–	4	–	0	5	–	4	–	0
Mercer	1	–	1	–	1	3	–	6	–	1
Louisiana College	2	–	3	–	1	3	–	4	–	1
Louisville	2	–	3	–	0	4	–	4	–	0
Millsaps	1	–	2	–	2	3	–	5	–	2
Transylvania	1	–	3	–	1	3	–	4	–	1
Tennessee Tech	1	–	5	–	0	2	–	5	–	1
Georgetown (KY)	1	–	5	–	1	2	–	5	–	1
Loyola (LA)	0	–	1	–	0	4	–	6	–	0
Stetson	0	–	3	–	1	2	–	5	–	1
Union (KY)	0	–	3	–	2	2	–	4	–	2
SW Louisiana	0	–	4	–	1	2	–	7	–	1
Wofford	0	–	4	–	1	1	–	7	–	1
Newberry	0	–	4	–	1	1	–	10	–	1
West Tennessee State Teachers	0	–	7	–	0	0	–	9	–	0
+ – Conference co-champions

The 1936 Miami Hurricanes football team represented the University of Miami as a member of the Southern Intercollegiate Athletic Association (SIAA) in the 1936 college football season. The Hurricanes played their home games at Miami Stadium in Miami, Florida. The team was coached by Irl Tubbs, in his second and final year as head coach for the Hurricanes.

== Schedule ==
Date	Time	Opponent	Site	Result	Attendance	Source
September 25	8:00 p.m.	South Georgia Teachers*	Miami Stadium; Miami, FL	W 44–0	4,000	
October 2		Tampa*	Miami Stadium; Miami, FL	T 0–0	200–300	
October 9		Bucknell*	Memorial Stadium; Lewisburg, PA	W 6–0		
October 17		at Rollins	Tinker Field; Orlando, FL	W 26–0	3,500	
October 31		at Boston University*	Nickerson Field; Weston, MA	T 7–7		
November 6	8:00 p.m.	Stetson	Miami Stadium; Miami, FL	W 20–6	5,000	
November 20		Mercer	Miami Stadium; Miami, FL	W 13–0		
November 27		Ole Miss*	Miami Stadium; Miami, FL	L 0–14	8,000	
December 4		Georgetown*	Miami Stadium; Miami, FL	W 10–6		
December 11		South Carolina*	Miami Stadium; Miami, FL	L 3–6		
*Non-conference game; All times are in Eastern time
