= 1936 Mississippi State Teachers Yellow Jackets football team =

American college football season

1936 Mississippi State Teachers Yellow Jackets football
- Conference: Southern Intercollegiate Athletic Association
- Record: 7–2–1 (4–4–1 SIAA)
- Head coach: Pooley Hubert (6th season)
- Home stadium: Faulkner Field

1936 Southern Intercollegiate Athletic Association football standings
	Conf.					Overall
Team	W		L		T	W		L		T
Middle Tennessee State Teachers +	4	–	0	–	0	7	–	1	–	0
The Citadel +	4	–	0	–	0	4	–	6	–	0
Miami (FL)	3	–	0	–	0	6	–	2	–	2
Centenary	2	–	0	–	0	6	–	4	–	2
Centre	2	–	0	–	0	5	–	4	–	0
Howard (AL)	2	–	0	–	1	5	–	3	–	1
Union (TN)	5	–	1	–	1	6	–	4	–	1
Rollins	4	–	1	–	0	7	–	1	–	0
Louisiana Tech	4	–	1	–	1	6	–	2	–	1
Morehead State	4	–	1	–	2	4	–	1	–	2
Eastern Kentucky	4	–	2	–	0	7	–	2	–	0
Mississippi State Teachers	4	–	2	–	1	7	–	2	–	1
Mississippi College	2	–	1	–	1	5	–	3	–	1
Western Kentucky State Teachers	3	–	2	–	0	6	–	3	–	0
Erskine	3	–	2	–	0	4	–	5	–	0
Presbyterian	3	–	2	–	0	3	–	6	–	0
Louisiana Normal	3	–	2	–	1	5	–	4	–	1
Murray State	4	–	4	–	0	5	–	4	–	0
Mercer	1	–	1	–	1	3	–	6	–	1
Louisiana College	2	–	3	–	1	3	–	4	–	1
Louisville	2	–	3	–	0	4	–	4	–	0
Millsaps	1	–	2	–	2	3	–	5	–	2
Transylvania	1	–	3	–	1	3	–	4	–	1
Tennessee Tech	1	–	5	–	0	2	–	5	–	1
Georgetown (KY)	1	–	5	–	1	2	–	5	–	1
Loyola (LA)	0	–	1	–	0	4	–	6	–	0
Stetson	0	–	3	–	1	2	–	5	–	1
Union (KY)	0	–	3	–	2	2	–	4	–	2
SW Louisiana	0	–	4	–	1	2	–	7	–	1
Wofford	0	–	4	–	1	1	–	7	–	1
Newberry	0	–	4	–	1	1	–	10	–	1
West Tennessee State Teachers	0	–	7	–	0	0	–	9	–	0
+ – Conference co-champions

The 1936 Mississippi State Teachers Yellow Jackets football team was an American football team that represented the Mississippi State Teachers College (now known as the University of Southern Mississippi) as a member of the Southern Intercollegiate Athletic Association during the 1936 college football season. In their sixth year under head coach Pooley Hubert, the team compiled a 7–2–1 record.

== Schedule ==
Date	Opponent	Site	Result	Source
September 26	at Louisiana College	Alumni Field; Pineville, LA	W 7–0	
October 3	at Union (TN)	Jackson, TN	L 0–7	
October 9	Millsaps	Faulkner Field; Hattiesburg, MS	T 0–0	
October 16	at Louisiana Tech	Tech Stadium; Ruston, LA (rivalry)	W 12–7	
October 23	West Tennessee State	Faulkner Field; Hattiesburg, MS (rivalry)	W 25–0	
October 29	Spring Hill*	Faulkner Field; Hattiesburg, MS	W 12–7	
November 6	Troy State*	Faulkner Field; Hattiesburg, MS	W 24–0	
November 13	Southwestern Louisiana^{†}	Faulkner Field; Hattiesburg, MS	W 44–14	
November 20	at Louisiana Normal	Demon Field; Natchitoches, LA	L 0–13	
November 26	East Texas State*	Faulkner Field; Hattiesburg, MS	W 13–6	
*Non-conference game; ^{†}Homecoming
