= 1936 Southwestern Louisiana Bulldogs football team =

American college football season

1936 Southwestern Louisiana Bulldogs football
- Conference: Southern Intercollegiate Athletic Association
- Record: 2–7–1 (0–4–1 SIAA)
- Head coach: Truman F. Wilbanks (6th season)
- Home stadium: Campus Athletic Field

1936 Southern Intercollegiate Athletic Association football standings
	Conf.					Overall
Team	W		L		T	W		L		T
Middle Tennessee State Teachers +	4	–	0	–	0	7	–	1	–	0
The Citadel +	4	–	0	–	0	4	–	6	–	0
Miami (FL)	3	–	0	–	0	6	–	2	–	2
Centenary	2	–	0	–	0	6	–	4	–	2
Centre	2	–	0	–	0	5	–	4	–	0
Howard (AL)	2	–	0	–	1	5	–	3	–	1
Union (TN)	5	–	1	–	1	6	–	4	–	1
Rollins	4	–	1	–	0	7	–	1	–	0
Louisiana Tech	4	–	1	–	1	6	–	2	–	1
Morehead State	4	–	1	–	2	4	–	1	–	2
Eastern Kentucky	4	–	2	–	0	7	–	2	–	0
Mississippi State Teachers	4	–	2	–	1	7	–	2	–	1
Mississippi College	2	–	1	–	1	5	–	3	–	1
Western Kentucky State Teachers	3	–	2	–	0	6	–	3	–	0
Erskine	3	–	2	–	0	4	–	5	–	0
Presbyterian	3	–	2	–	0	3	–	6	–	0
Louisiana Normal	3	–	2	–	1	5	–	4	–	1
Murray State	4	–	4	–	0	5	–	4	–	0
Mercer	1	–	1	–	1	3	–	6	–	1
Louisiana College	2	–	3	–	1	3	–	4	–	1
Louisville	2	–	3	–	0	4	–	4	–	0
Millsaps	1	–	2	–	2	3	–	5	–	2
Transylvania	1	–	3	–	1	3	–	4	–	1
Tennessee Tech	1	–	5	–	0	2	–	5	–	1
Georgetown (KY)	1	–	5	–	1	2	–	5	–	1
Loyola (LA)	0	–	1	–	0	4	–	6	–	0
Stetson	0	–	3	–	1	2	–	5	–	1
Union (KY)	0	–	3	–	2	2	–	4	–	2
SW Louisiana	0	–	4	–	1	2	–	7	–	1
Wofford	0	–	4	–	1	1	–	7	–	1
Newberry	0	–	4	–	1	1	–	10	–	1
West Tennessee State Teachers	0	–	7	–	0	0	–	9	–	0
+ – Conference co-champions

The 1936 Southwestern Louisiana Bulldogs football team was an American football team that represented the Southwestern Louisiana Institute of Liberal and Technical Learning (now known as the University of Louisiana at Lafayette) in the Southern Intercollegiate Athletic Association during the 1936 college football season. In their sixth year under head coach Truman F. Wilbanks, the team compiled a 2–7–1 record.

== Schedule ==
Date	Opponent	Site	Result	Source
September 25	Mississippi College	Campus Athletic Field; Lafayette, LA	T 13–13	
October 3	vs. Lamar*	Lake Charles, LA (rivalry)	W 13–6	
October 8	Louisiana Tech	Campus Athletic Field; Lafayette, LA (rivalry)	L 7–20	
October 16	at Spring Hill*	Dorn Stadium; Mobile, AL	L 0–6	
October 23	Sam Houston State*	Campus Athletic Field; Lafayette, LA	W 7–6	
October 31	at Louisiana College	Alumni Field; Pineville, LA	L 0–12	
November 6	Southeastern Louisiana*	Campus Athletic Field; Lafayette, LA (rivalry)	L 0–19	
November 13	at Mississippi State Teachers	Faulkner Field; Hattiesburg, MS	L 14–44	
November 21	at No. 5 LSU*	Tiger Stadium; Baton Rouge, LA	L 0–93	
November 26	Louisiana Normal	Campus Athletic Field; Lafayette, LA	L 0–6	
*Non-conference game; Rankings from Coaches' Poll released prior to the game
