= 1936 Lehigh Engineers football team =

American college football season

1936 Lehigh Engineers football

Middle Three champion
- Conference: Middle Three Conference
- Record: 6–2 (2–0 Middle Three)
- Head coach: Glen Harmeson (3rd season)
- Captain: Joseph Walton
- Home stadium: Taylor Stadium

1936 Middle Three Conference football standings
	Conf.					Overall
Team	W		L		T	W		L		T
Lehigh $	2	–	0	–	0	6	–	2	–	0
Rutgers	0	–	1	–	0	1	–	6	–	1
Lafayette	0	–	1	–	0	1	–	8	–	0
$ – Conference champion

The 1936 Lehigh Engineers football team was an American football team that represented Lehigh University during the 1936 college football season. In its second season under head coach Glen Harmeson, the team compiled a 6–2 record, and swept its Middle Three Conference rivals to earn the championship. Lehigh played home games at Taylor Stadium in Bethlehem, Pennsylvania.

== Schedule ==
Date	Opponent	Site	Result	Attendance	Source
September 26	at Case*	Van Horn Field; Cleveland, OH	W 16–7		
October 3	Dickinson*	Taylor Stadium; Bethlehem, PA	L 6–20	5,000	
October 10	Johns Hopkins*	Taylor Stadium; Bethlehem, PA	W 20–0	4,000	
October 17	Penn State*	Taylor Stadium; Bethlehem, PA	W 7–6		
October 24	at Gettysburg*	Memorial Stadium; Gettysburg, PA	L 7–10	4,000	
October 31	at Rutgers	Neilson Field; New Brunswick, NJ	W 19–0	7,000	
November 14	Muhlenberg*	Taylor Stadium; Bethlehem, PA	W 26–6	9,000	
November 21	at Lafayette	Fisher Field; Easton, PA (rivalry)	W 18–0	12,000	
*Non-conference game
