= 1936 Centenary Gentlemen football team =

American college football season

1936 Centenary Gentlemen football
- Conference: Southern Intercollegiate Athletic Association
- Record: 6–4–2 (2–0 SIAA)
- Head coach: Curtis Parker (3rd season)
- Home stadium: Centenary Field

1936 Southern Intercollegiate Athletic Association football standings
	Conf.					Overall
Team	W		L		T	W		L		T
Middle Tennessee State Teachers +	4	–	0	–	0	7	–	1	–	0
The Citadel +	4	–	0	–	0	4	–	6	–	0
Miami (FL)	3	–	0	–	0	6	–	2	–	2
Centenary	2	–	0	–	0	6	–	4	–	2
Centre	2	–	0	–	0	5	–	4	–	0
Howard (AL)	2	–	0	–	1	5	–	3	–	1
Union (TN)	5	–	1	–	1	6	–	4	–	1
Rollins	4	–	1	–	0	7	–	1	–	0
Louisiana Tech	4	–	1	–	1	6	–	2	–	1
Morehead State	4	–	1	–	2	4	–	1	–	2
Eastern Kentucky	4	–	2	–	0	7	–	2	–	0
Mississippi State Teachers	4	–	2	–	1	7	–	2	–	1
Mississippi College	2	–	1	–	1	5	–	3	–	1
Western Kentucky State Teachers	3	–	2	–	0	6	–	3	–	0
Erskine	3	–	2	–	0	4	–	5	–	0
Presbyterian	3	–	2	–	0	3	–	6	–	0
Louisiana Normal	3	–	2	–	1	5	–	4	–	1
Murray State	4	–	4	–	0	5	–	4	–	0
Mercer	1	–	1	–	1	3	–	6	–	1
Louisiana College	2	–	3	–	1	3	–	4	–	1
Louisville	2	–	3	–	0	4	–	4	–	0
Millsaps	1	–	2	–	2	3	–	5	–	2
Transylvania	1	–	3	–	1	3	–	4	–	1
Tennessee Tech	1	–	5	–	0	2	–	5	–	1
Georgetown (KY)	1	–	5	–	1	2	–	5	–	1
Loyola (LA)	0	–	1	–	0	4	–	6	–	0
Stetson	0	–	3	–	1	2	–	5	–	1
Union (KY)	0	–	3	–	2	2	–	4	–	2
SW Louisiana	0	–	4	–	1	2	–	7	–	1
Wofford	0	–	4	–	1	1	–	7	–	1
Newberry	0	–	4	–	1	1	–	10	–	1
West Tennessee State Teachers	0	–	7	–	0	0	–	9	–	0
+ – Conference co-champions

The 1936 Centenary Gentlemen football team was an American football team that represented the Centenary College of Louisiana as a member of the Southern Intercollegiate Athletic Association during the 1936 college football season. In their third year under head coach Curtis Parker, the team compiled a 6–4–2 record.

== Schedule ==
Date	Opponent	Site	Result	Attendance	Source
September 17	at Louisiana College	LC Stadium; Pineville, LA	W 21–0	4,000	
September 19	Louisiana Normal	Centenary Field; Shreveport, LA	W 20–0	4,000	
September 26	Illinois Wesleyan*	Centenary Field; Shreveport, LA	W 21–7	4,500	
October 3	vs. Baylor*	Rose Festival Stadium; Tyler, TX	W 10–0	12,000	
October 10	at Tulane*	Tulane Stadium; New Orleans, LA	L 0–19		
October 17	at Arizona*	Arizona Stadium; Tucson, AZ	T 13–13	8,000	
October 24	at Texas Tech*	Tech Field; Lubbock, TX	L 12–6	8,000	
October 31	Ole Miss*	State Fair Stadium; Shreveport, LA	L 7–24	10,000	
November 7	at Tulsa*	Skelly Field; Tulsa, OK	T 3–3	8,000	
November 14	at No. 18 TCU*	Amon G. Carter Stadium; Fort Worth, TX	L 0–26		
November 21	No. 14 Texas A&M*	Centenary Field; Shreveport, LA	W 3–0		
November 26	Oklahoma A&M*^{†}	Centenary Field; Shreveport, LA	W 7–0	5,000	
*Non-conference game; ^{†}Homecoming; Rankings from AP Poll released prior to the game
