= 1936 Chattanooga Moccasins football team =

American college football season

1936 Chattanooga Moccasins football
- Conference: Dixie Conference
- Record: 5–2–1 (3–1–1 Dixie)
- Head coach: Scrappy Moore (6th season)
- Captain: Arnold Watland
- Home stadium: Chamberlain Field

1936 Dixie Conference football standings
	Conf.					Overall
Team	W		L		T	W		L		T
Howard (AL) $	4	–	1	–	1	5	–	3	–	1
Southwestern (TN)	3	–	1	–	1	7	–	2	–	1
Chattanooga	3	–	1	–	1	5	–	2	–	1
Birmingham–Southern	4	–	3	–	0	4	–	5	–	0
Mississippi College	2	–	2	–	0	5	–	3	–	1
Loyola (LA)	2	–	2	–	0	4	–	6	–	0
Millsaps	2	–	3	–	0	3	–	5	–	2
Mercer	0	–	2	–	1	3	–	6	–	1
Spring Hill	0	–	5	–	0	3	–	6	–	0
$ – Conference champion

The 1936 Chattanooga Moccasins football team was an American football team that represented the University of Chattanooga (now known as the University of Tennessee at Chattanooga) in the Dixie Conference during the 1936 college football season. In its sixth year under head coach Scrappy Moore, the team compiled a 5–2–1 record.

== Schedule ==
Date	Opponent	Site	Result	Attendance	Source
September 26	at Tennessee*	Shields–Watkins Field; Knoxville, TN	L 0–13	7,000	
October 2	Mississippi College	Chamberlain Field; Chattanooga, TN	W 7–6		
October 10	Oglethorpe*	Chamberlain Field; Chattanooga, TN	W 20–6		
October 16	Southwestern (TN)	Chamberlain Field; Chattanooga, TN	T 0–0		
October 24	at Birmingham–Southern	Legion Field; Birmingham, AL	L 7–14		
November 7	Mercer	Chamberlain Field; Chattanooga, TN	W 6–0		
November 14	at The Citadel*	Johnson Hagood Stadium; Charleston, SC	W 13–0		
November 26	Howard (AL)	Chamberlain Field; Chattanooga, TN	W 6–0	3,521	
*Non-conference game
