= 1936 Middle Tennessee State Teachers Blue Raiders football team =

American college football season

1936 Middle Tennessee State Teachers Blue Raiders football

SIAA co-champion
- Conference: Southern Intercollegiate Athletic Association
- Record: 7–1 (4–0 SIAA)
- Head coach: Johnny Floyd (3rd season)
- Captain: Miles Baskins
- Home stadium: Horace Jones Field

1936 Southern Intercollegiate Athletic Association football standings
	Conf.					Overall
Team	W		L		T	W		L		T
Middle Tennessee State Teachers +	4	–	0	–	0	7	–	1	–	0
The Citadel +	4	–	0	–	0	4	–	6	–	0
Miami (FL)	3	–	0	–	0	6	–	2	–	2
Centenary	2	–	0	–	0	6	–	4	–	2
Centre	2	–	0	–	0	5	–	4	–	0
Howard (AL)	2	–	0	–	1	5	–	3	–	1
Union (TN)	5	–	1	–	1	6	–	4	–	1
Rollins	4	–	1	–	0	7	–	1	–	0
Louisiana Tech	4	–	1	–	1	6	–	2	–	1
Morehead State	4	–	1	–	2	4	–	1	–	2
Eastern Kentucky	4	–	2	–	0	7	–	2	–	0
Mississippi State Teachers	4	–	2	–	1	7	–	2	–	1
Mississippi College	2	–	1	–	1	5	–	3	–	1
Western Kentucky State Teachers	3	–	2	–	0	6	–	3	–	0
Erskine	3	–	2	–	0	4	–	5	–	0
Presbyterian	3	–	2	–	0	3	–	6	–	0
Louisiana Normal	3	–	2	–	1	5	–	4	–	1
Murray State	4	–	4	–	0	5	–	4	–	0
Mercer	1	–	1	–	1	3	–	6	–	1
Louisiana College	2	–	3	–	1	3	–	4	–	1
Louisville	2	–	3	–	0	4	–	4	–	0
Millsaps	1	–	2	–	2	3	–	5	–	2
Transylvania	1	–	3	–	1	3	–	4	–	1
Tennessee Tech	1	–	5	–	0	2	–	5	–	1
Georgetown (KY)	1	–	5	–	1	2	–	5	–	1
Loyola (LA)	0	–	1	–	0	4	–	6	–	0
Stetson	0	–	3	–	1	2	–	5	–	1
Union (KY)	0	–	3	–	2	2	–	4	–	2
SW Louisiana	0	–	4	–	1	2	–	7	–	1
Wofford	0	–	4	–	1	1	–	7	–	1
Newberry	0	–	4	–	1	1	–	10	–	1
West Tennessee State Teachers	0	–	7	–	0	0	–	9	–	0
+ – Conference co-champions

The 1936 Middle Tennessee State Teachers Blue Raiders football team was an American football team that represented Middle Tennessee State Teachers College (now known as Middle Tennessee State University) as a member of the Southern Intercollegiate Athletic Association during the 1936 college football season. In their third season under head coach Johnny Floyd, Middle Tennessee compiled a 7–1 record and finished as SIAA co-champion. The team's captain was Miles Baskins.

== Schedule ==
Date	Opponent	Site	Result	Source
September 26	at Vanderbilt*	Dudley Field; Nashville, TN	L 0–45	
October 2	Jacksonville State*	Horace Jones Field; Murfreesboro, TN	W 12–0	
October 9	Troy State*	Horace Jones Field; Murfreesboro, TN (rivalry)	W 19–0	
October 17	at Western Kentucky State Teachers	Bowling Green, KY (rivalry)	W 9–0	
October 23	Murray State	Horace Jones Field; Murfreesboro, TN	W 19–14	
October 31	at West Tennessee State Teachers	Memorial Field; Memphis, TN	W 19–0	
November 7	Austin Peay*	Horace Jones Field; Murfreesboro, TN	W 27–0	
November 26	Tennessee Tech	Horace Jones Field; Murfreesboro, TN	W 7–6	
*Non-conference game
