= 1936 college football season =

American college football season

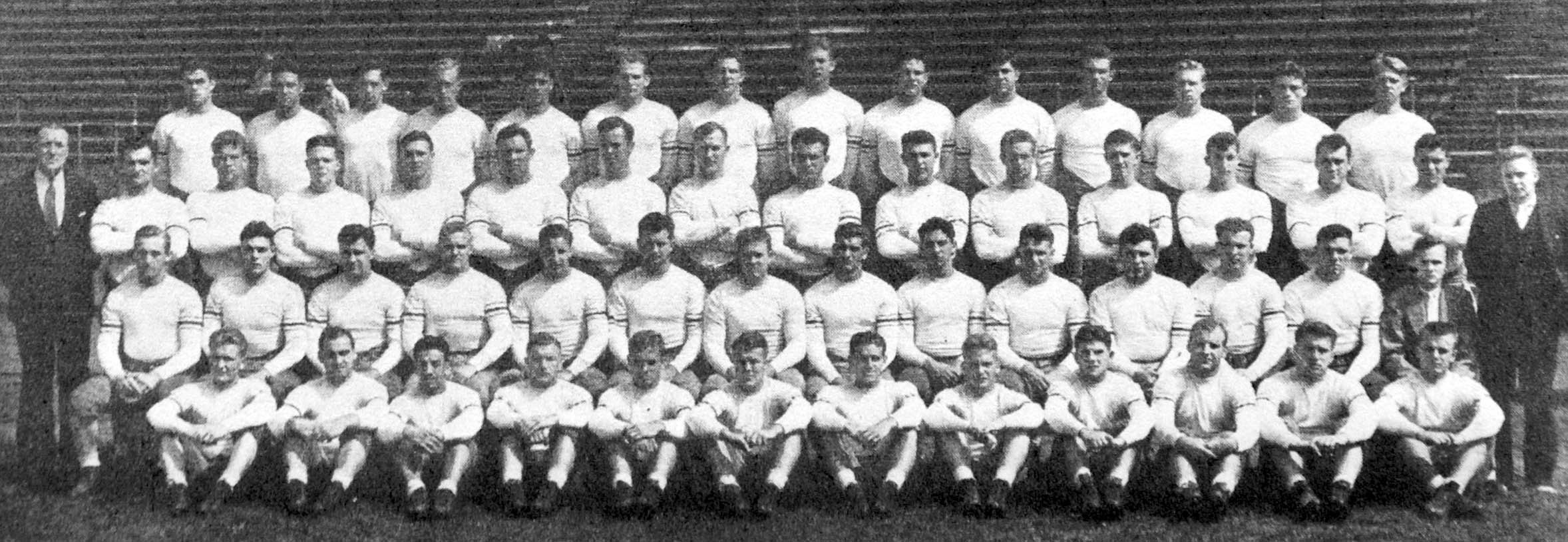
- Pitt, co-champions
- First AP No. 1 of season: Minnesota
- Number of bowls: 6
- Champion(s): Minnesota (Note: per AP poll, Dunkel System, Dickinson System, Litkenhous Ratings, Poling System, Toledo Cup committee vote, Billingsley Report, Helms Athletic Foundation, National Championship Foundation); Pittsburgh (Note: per Boand System, Houlgate System, and College Football Researchers Association); LSU (Note: per Williamson System, Sagarin Ratings Elo chess method, and Sagarin Ratings Predictor method) (not claimed); Duke (Note: per Berryman QPRS) (not claimed)
- Heisman: Larry Kelley (end, Yale)

The 1936 college football season was the first in which the Associated Press writers' poll selected a national champion. The first AP poll, taken of 35 writers, was released on October 20, 1936. Each writer listed his choice for the top ten teams, and points were tallied based on 10 for first place, 9 for second, etc., and the AP then ranked the twenty teams with the highest number of points. In the first poll, Minnesota received 32 first place votes, and 3 votes for an additional 25 points, for a total of 345 altogether. Of the seven contemporary math system selectors, two chose Pittsburgh as the top team.

The 1936 season also saw the addition of another major New Year's Day bowl game, as Dallas hosted the first Cotton Bowl Classic.

== Conference and program changes ==
=== Conference changes ===
- One conference began play in 1936:
  - Alamo Conference – conference active through the 1940 season
- One conference played its final season in 1936:
  - Chesapeake Conference – conference active since the 1933 season

=== Membership changes ===
School	1935 Conference	1936 Conference
The Citadel Bulldogs	SIAA	Southern
Davidson Wildcats	Independent	Southern
Furman Paladins	SIAA	Southern
George Washington Colonials	Independent	Southern
Richmond Spiders	Virginia	Southern
St. Francis (NY) Terriers	Independent	Dropped Program
Virginia Cavaliers	Southern	Independent
Wake Forest Demon Deacons	Independent	Southern
William & Mary Indians	Virginia	Southern

== September ==
September 19 TCU opened with a 6–0 win at Howard Payne College at Brownwood, Texas.

September 26 In Seattle, Minnesota opened its season with a 14–7 win over Washington.

Defending champ (under the Dickinson ratings) SMU had a tough time in beating North Texas, 6–0, and Rose Bowl winner Stanford lost its opener to visiting Santa Clara 13–0. Sugar Bowl winner TCU lost at Texas Tech 7–0. LSU beat visiting Rice 20–7. Alabama beat Samford 34–0 and Pittsburgh beat Ohio Wesleyan 53–0.

== October ==
October 3 Santa Clara beat Loyola Marymount 13–6. LSU and Texas played to a 6–6 tie. Alabama defeated Clemson 32–0. Northwestern opened with an 18–7 win over Iowa. Pittsburgh beat West Virginia 34–0.

October 10 Minnesota beat visiting Nebraska 7–0. Pittsburgh won at Ohio State 6–0. Washington won at UCLA 14–0. Santa Clara beat San Francisco 15–7. Alabama beat Mississippi State 7–0. Northwestern beat North Dakota State 40–7.

October 17 Minnesota defeated Michigan 26–0. Santa Clara won at San Jose State 20–0. In Birmingham, Alabama and Tennessee played to a 0–0 tie. Northwestern edged Ohio State 14–13. In a meeting between Pittsburgh's two unbeaten (3–0–0) and untied schools, Pittsburgh was beaten by Duquesne, 7–0. Washington beat Oregon State 19–7.

The first AP Poll was released on October 20, with Minnesota being the majority favorite, with 32 of 35 first place votes, and 345 out of 350 points. The Gophers were followed by No. 2 Duke, No. 3 Army, No. 4 Northwestern, and No. 5 Purdue. USC, ranked No. 6, received one first place vote.

October 24 No. 1 Minnesota hosted No. 5 Purdue in a meeting of unbeaten (3–0–0) schools. Minnesota proved the AP voters right by winning 33–0. No. 2 Duke (5–0–0) lost to (1–2–1) Tennessee, 15–13. No. 3 Army beat Springfield College 33–0. No. 4 Northwestern won at Illinois 13–2. No. 8 Washington beat California 13–0. No. 9 Pittsburgh beat visiting, and previously unbeaten, No. 7 Notre Dame 26–0. No. 16 Fordham edged visiting No. 12 St. Mary's 7–6. The next top five was No. 1 Minnesota, No. 2 Pitt, No. 3 Northwestern, No. 4 Washington, and No. 5 Fordham.

October 31 In a Friday night game, No. 1 Minnesota and No. 3 Northwestern, both unbeaten (4–0–0), met in a Big Ten conference game at Evanston. The Gophers had not lost a game in more than three years, and the game was scoreless after three quarters, until Northwestern's line "ripped a gaping hole in the Gophers' forward wall" and Steve Toth drove across the goal line. With five minutes left, Minnesota's Rudy Gmitro was in the clear for a touchdown before being brought down by Fred Vanzon, and Northwestern held on for the 6–0 win.

At the Polo Grounds in New York, No. 2 Pittsburgh and No. 5 Fordham played to a 0–0 tie. In Portland, No. 4 Washington beat Oregon 7–0, but dropped to 6th. No. 10 Marquette beat visiting No. 20 St. Mary's 20–6 and rose to 4th place. The next top five was No. 1 Northwestern, No. 2 Minnesota, No. 3 Fordham, No. 4 Marquette, and No. 5 Pitt.

== November ==
November 7 No. 1 Northwestern beat Wisconsin 26–18. No. 2 Minnesota beat Iowa 52–0. No. 3 Fordham defeated visiting Purdue 15–0. No. 4 Marquette narrowly won in Omaha against Creighton, 7–6. No. 5 Pittsburgh beat Penn State 34–7. No. 14 Alabama and No. 10 Tulane, both 5–0–1, met at Tuscaloosa. Alabama's 34–7 win was followed by its rise to 4th place in the poll, with Marquette dropping to 8th.

November 14 No. 1 Northwestern won 9–0 at Michigan to clinch the Big Ten title, while No. 2 Minnesota beat Texas 47–19. No. 3 Fordham was idle. No. 4 Alabama beat Georgia Tech in Atlanta, 20–16. No. 5 Pittsburgh won at No. 6 Nebraska 19–6. In Birmingham, No. 7 LSU beat Auburn 19–6 to extend its record to 7–0–1 and move to 5th place in the poll, with Alabama falling to 8th.

November 21 No. 1 Northwestern lost at No. 11 Notre Dame, 26–6, while No. 2 Minnesota won at Wisconsin 24–0 in their season finale. No. 3 Fordham and visiting Georgia played to a 7–7 tie. No. 4 Pittsburgh was idle. No. 5 LSU beat Lafayette College of Louisiana 93–0. No. 9 Santa Clara won in San Francisco at St. Mary's, 19–0. In the poll that followed, Northwestern—which had been one game away from a perfect season—fell to seventh place and Minnesota regained the top spot, ahead of LSU, Alabama, Pitt, and Santa Clara.

On November 26, Thanksgiving Day, No. 3 Alabama beat Vanderbilt 14–6 in Birmingham. No. 4 Pittsburgh beat its other crosstown rival, Carnegie Tech, 31–14. No. 6 Washington beat No. 20 Washington State 40–0. At Yankee Stadium Fordham, which had fallen to 8th, (5–0–2) lost to NYU, 7–6.

November 28 No. 2 LSU clinched the SEC title with a 33–0 win over No. 19 Tulane. No. 5 Santa Clara lost to No. 18 TCU, 9–0. The final AP Poll ranked Minnesota, LSU, Pitt, Alabama, and Washington as the top five.

== Conference standings ==
=== Major conference standings ===
1936 Big Six Conference football standings
	Conf.					Overall
Team	W		L		T	W		L		T
No. 9 Nebraska $	5	–	0	–	0	7	–	2	–	0
Missouri	3	–	1	–	1	6	–	2	–	1
Kansas State	2	–	1	–	2	4	–	3	–	2
Oklahoma	1	–	2	–	2	3	–	3	–	3
Iowa State	1	–	3	–	1	3	–	3	–	2
Kansas	0	–	5	–	0	1	–	6	–	1
$ – Conference champion; Rankings from AP Poll

1936 Big Ten Conference football standings
	Conf.					Overall
Team	W		L		T	W		L		T
No. 7 Northwestern $	6	–	0	–	0	7	–	1	–	0
No. 1 Minnesota	4	–	1	–	0	7	–	1	–	0
Ohio State	4	–	1	–	0	5	–	3	–	0
Indiana	3	–	1	–	1	5	–	2	–	1
Purdue	3	–	1	–	1	5	–	2	–	1
Illinois	2	–	2	–	1	4	–	3	–	1
Chicago	1	–	4	–	0	2	–	5	–	1
Iowa	0	–	4	–	1	3	–	4	–	1
Wisconsin	0	–	4	–	0	2	–	6	–	0
Michigan	0	–	5	–	0	1	–	7	–	0
$ – Conference champion; Rankings from AP Poll

1936 Border Conference football standings
	Conf.					Overall
Team	W		L		T	W		L		T
Arizona $	3	–	0	–	0	5	–	2	–	3
Texas Mines	2	–	1	–	1	5	–	3	–	1
New Mexico A&M	3	–	2	–	0	6	–	4	–	1
Arizona State	2	–	3	–	0	4	–	5	–	0
Arizona State–Flagstaff	1	–	2	–	1	3	–	4	–	1
New Mexico	1	–	4	–	0	2	–	7	–	0
Texas Tech	0	–	0	–	0	5	–	4	–	1
$ – Conference champion; Arizona State and Arizona State–Flagstaff played twice, but only the first meeting counted in the conference standings. The game between Arizona and Texas Tech also did not count in the conference standings.

1936 Pacific Coast Conference football standings
	Conf.					Overall
Team	W		L		T	W		L		T
No. 5 Washington $	7	–	0	–	1	7	–	2	–	1
Washington State	6	–	2	–	1	6	–	3	–	1
USC	3	–	2	–	2	4	–	2	–	3
California	4	–	3	–	0	6	–	5	–	0
UCLA	4	–	3	–	1	6	–	3	–	1
Stanford	2	–	3	–	2	2	–	5	–	2
Oregon State	3	–	5	–	0	4	–	6	–	0
Montana	1	–	3	–	0	6	–	3	–	0
Oregon	1	–	6	–	1	2	–	6	–	1
Idaho	0	–	4	–	0	3	–	7	–	0
$ – Conference champion; Rankings from AP Poll

1936 Rocky Mountain Conference football standings
	Conf.					Overall
Team	W		L		T	W		L		T
Utah State $	6	–	0	–	1	7	–	0	–	1
Denver	6	–	1	–	1	7	–	1	–	1
Utah	5	–	2	–	0	6	–	3	–	0
Colorado	4	–	2	–	0	4	–	3	–	0
Colorado State–Greeley	4	–	3	–	0	5	–	4	–	0
BYU	4	–	4	–	0	4	–	5	–	0
Colorado A&M	3	–	4	–	1	4	–	4	–	1
Colorado College	3	–	4	–	0	3	–	4	–	1
Wyoming	2	–	4	–	1	2	–	5	–	1
Montana State	1	–	4	–	0	3	–	5	–	0
Western State (CO)	1	–	5	–	0	1	–	6	–	0
Colorado Mines	0	–	6	–	0	2	–	6	–	0
$ – Conference champion

1936 Southeastern Conference football standings
	Conf.					Overall
Team	W		L		T	W		L		T
No. 2 LSU $	6	–	0	–	0	9	–	1	–	1
No. 4 Alabama	5	–	0	–	1	8	–	0	–	1
Auburn	4	–	1	–	1	7	–	2	–	2
No. 17 Tennessee	3	–	1	–	2	6	–	2	–	2
Mississippi State	3	–	2	–	0	7	–	3	–	1
Georgia	3	–	3	–	0	5	–	4	–	1
Georgia Tech	3	–	3	–	1	5	–	5	–	1
Tulane	2	–	3	–	1	6	–	3	–	1
Vanderbilt	1	–	3	–	1	3	–	5	–	1
Kentucky	1	–	3	–	0	6	–	4	–	0
Florida	1	–	5	–	0	4	–	6	–	0
Ole Miss	0	–	3	–	1	5	–	5	–	2
Sewanee	0	–	5	–	0	0	–	6	–	1
$ – Conference champion

1936 Southern Conference football standings
	Conf.					Overall
Team	W		L		T	W		L		T
No. 11 Duke $	7	–	0	–	0	9	–	1	–	0
North Carolina	6	–	1	–	0	8	–	2	–	0
Furman	4	–	1	–	0	7	–	2	–	0
VMI	4	–	2	–	0	6	–	4	–	0
Maryland	3	–	2	–	0	5	–	5	–	0
Clemson	3	–	3	–	0	5	–	5	–	0
Davidson	4	–	3	–	0	5	–	4	–	0
Washington and Lee	2	–	2	–	0	4	–	5	–	0
Wake Forest	2	–	2	–	0	5	–	4	–	0
NC State	2	–	4	–	0	3	–	7	–	0
VPI	4	–	5	–	0	5	–	5	–	0
South Carolina	2	–	5	–	0	5	–	7	–	0
Richmond	1	–	3	–	0	4	–	4	–	2
Virginia	1	–	5	–	0	2	–	7	–	0
The Citadel	0	–	4	–	0	4	–	6	–	0
William & Mary	0	–	5	–	0	1	–	8	–	0
$ – Conference champion; Rankings from AP Poll

1936 Southwest Conference football standings
	Conf.					Overall
Team	W		L		T	W		L		T
No. 18 Arkansas $	5	–	1	–	0	7	–	3	–	0
No. 16 TCU	4	–	1	–	1	9	–	2	–	2
Texas A&M	3	–	2	–	1	8	–	3	–	1
Baylor	3	–	2	–	1	6	–	3	–	1
SMU	2	–	3	–	1	5	–	4	–	1
Rice	1	–	5	–	0	5	–	7	–	0
Texas	1	–	5	–	0	2	–	6	–	1
$ – Conference champion; Rankings from AP Poll

=== Independents ===
1936 Eastern college football independents records
	Conf.			Overall
Team	W	L	T	W		L		T
Middlebury		–		8	–	0	–	0
Saint Anselm		–		6	–	0	–	1
No. 3 Pittsburgh		–		8	–	1	–	1
No. 10 Penn		–		7	–	1	–	0
No. 12 Yale		–		7	–	1	–	0
No. 13 Dartmouth		–		7	–	1	–	1
Franklin & Marshall		–		7	–	1	–	1
No. 14 Duquesne		–		8	–	2	–	0
Boston College		–		6	–	1	–	2
Boston University		–		5	–	1	–	2
No. 15 Fordham		–		5	–	1	–	2
Holy Cross		–		7	–	2	–	1
Villanova		–		7	–	2	–	1
Army		–		6	–	3	–	0
Colgate		–		6	–	3	–	0
Drexel		–		6	–	3	–	0
Temple		–		6	–	3	–	2
La Salle		–		6	–	3	–	1
Buffalo		–		5	–	3	–	0
Columbia		–		5	–	3	–	0
Princeton		–		4	–	2	–	2
Saint Vincent		–		5	–	3	–	0
NYU		–		5	–	3	–	1
Manhattan		–		6	–	4	–	0
Northeastern		–		5	–	4	–	0
Bucknell		–		4	–	4	–	1
CCNY		–		4	–	4	–	0
Tufts		–		3	–	3	–	1
Harvard		–		3	–	4	–	1
Cornell		–		3	–	5	–	0
Penn State		–		3	–	5	–	0
Westminster (PA)		–		2	–	4	–	1
Brown		–		3	–	7	–	0
Carnegie Tech		–		2	–	6	–	0
Massachusetts State		–		2	–	6	–	0
Providence		–		1	–	7	–	0
Syracuse		–		1	–	7	–	0
Vermont		–		1	–	8	–	0
Rankings from AP Poll

1936 Midwestern college football independents records
	Conf.			Overall
Team	W	L	T	W		L		T
DePaul		–		7	–	2	–	0
No. 20 Marquette		–		7	–	2	–	0
Michigan State		–		6	–	1	–	2
Michigan State Normal		–		6	–	2	–	0
No. 8 Notre Dame		–		6	–	2	–	1
Wayne		–		5	–	2	–	1
Detroit		–		7	–	3	–	0
Xavier		–		6	–	4	–	0
Saint Louis		–		5	–	4	–	1
Central Michigan		–		3	–	4	–	1
Michigan Tech		–		2	–	3	–	0
Western State Teachers		–		2	–	5	–	0
Haskell		–		1	–	6	–	1
Rankings from AP Poll

1936 Southern college football independents records
	Conf.			Overall
Team	W	L	T	W		L		T
George Washington		–		7	–	1	–	1
Hardin–Simmons		–		9	–	2	–	0
Georgetown		–		6	–	2	–	1
Roanoke		–		6	–	2	–	1
Western Maryland		–		7	–	3	–	1
No. 18 Navy		–		6	–	3	–	0
Tampa		–		5	–	3	–	2
West Virginia		–		6	–	4	–	0
East Carolina		–		3	–	2	–	0
Catholic University		–		4	–	4	–	0
Jacksonville State		–		2	–	2	–	1
Oklahoma City		–		4	–	4	–	0
William & Mary Norfolk		–		4	–	4	–	0
Tennessee State		–		3	–	3	–	2
Oglethorpe		–		4	–	5	–	0
Texas Wesleyan		–		3	–	6	–	1
Troy State		–		3	–	6	–	0
Delaware		–		2	–	6	–	0
South Georgia Teachers		–		2	–	8	–	0
Rankings from AP Poll

1936 Western college football independents records
	Conf.			Overall
Team	W	L	T	W		L		T
No. 6 Santa Clara		–		8	–	1	–	0
Humboldt State		–		6	–	3	–	0
Loyola (CA)		–		6	–	3	–	0
Saint Mary's		–		6	–	3	–	1
Gonzaga		–		5	–	3	–	0
Pomona		–		6	–	4	–	0
Cal Poly		–		5	–	4	–	0
San Jose State		–		5	–	4	–	0
Idaho Southern Branch		–		4	–	4	–	0
San Francisco		–		4	–	4	–	2
Portland		–		3	–	4	–	0
San Francisco State		–		2	–	3	–	1
Hawaii		–		3	–	5	–	0
Rankings from AP Poll

=== Minor conferences ===
Conference	Champion(s)	Record
Alamo Conference	Texas A&I	1–1
Central Intercollegiate Athletics Association	Virginia State College	6–0–2
Central Intercollegiate Athletic Conference	Kansas State Teachers–Hays	4–0
Far Western Conference	Pacific	6–0
Indiana Intercollegiate Conference	Wabash	7–0
Iowa Intercollegiate Athletic Conference	Parsons	6–0
Kansas Collegiate Athletic Conference	Kansas Wesleyan	4–0–1
Lone Star Conference	North Texas State Teachers	4–0
Michigan Intercollegiate Athletic Association	Kalamazoo	7–0–1
Michigan-Ontario Collegiate Conference	Adrian	–
Midwest Collegiate Athletic Conference	Carleton; Coe	3–0; 4–0
Minnesota Intercollegiate Athletic Conference	Gustavus Adolphus; Saint John's (MN)	5–0; 4–0
Missouri Intercollegiate Athletic Association	Northeast Missouri State Teachers	5–0
Nebraska College Athletic Conference	Hastings	4–0
Nebraska Intercollegiate Athletic Association	Nebraska State Teachers	3–0
North Central Intercollegiate Athletic Conference	North Dakota	4–0
North Dakota College Athletic Conference	North Dakota Science	6–0
Northern Teachers Athletic Conference	St. Cloud State Teachers	4–0
Ohio Athletic Conference	Marietta	8–0
Oklahoma Collegiate Athletic Conference	Central State Teachers (OK)	6–0
Pacific Northwest Conference	Willamette	6–0
Pennsylvania State Athletic Conference	Lock Haven State Teachers	6–0–2
South Dakota Intercollegiate Conference	Augustana (SD)	4–0
Southern California Intercollegiate Athletic Conference	San Diego State	5–0
Southern Intercollegiate Athletic Conference	Tuskegee	—
Southwestern Athletic Conference	Langston; Texas College	4–1–1
Texas Collegiate Athletic Conference	Howard Payne	5–0–1
Tri-Normal League	State Normal–Cheney	2–0
Wisconsin State Teachers College Conference	North: Superior State Teachers; South: Stevens Point State Teachers	4–0; 2–1–1

=== Minor conference standings ===
1936 Alamo Conference football standings
	Conf.					Overall
Team	W		L		T	W		L		T
St. Mary's (TX) +	1	–	1	–	0	7	–	3	–	2
Texas A&I +	1	–	1	–	0	6	–	4	–	0
Sul Ross +	1	–	1	–	0	4	–	3	–	1
+ – Conference co-champions

1936 Central Intercollegiate Conference football standings
	Conf.					Overall
Team	W		L		T	W		L		T
Fort Hays State $	4	–	0	–	0	6	–	3	–	0
Pittsburg State	3	–	1	–	0	3	–	5	–	0
Emporia Teachers	2	–	2	–	0	6	–	4	–	0
Wichita	1	–	3	–	0	4	–	5	–	0
Southwestern (KS)	0	–	4	–	0	1	–	7	–	0
$ – Conference champion

1936 Colored Intercollegiate Athletic Association football standings
	Conf.					Overall
Team	W		L		T	W		L		T
Virginia State $	6	–	0	–	2	7	–	0	–	2
Morgan	5	–	0	–	2	6	–	0	–	2
Bluefield State	3	–	0	–	3	3	–	2	–	4
Hampton	5	–	2	–	1	5	–	2	–	1
Shaw	3	–	2	–	0	5	–	3	–	1
North Carolina A&T	4	–	4	–	0	5	–	4	–	0
North Carolina College	3	–	3	–	1	4	–	3	–	1
Johnson C. Smith	1	–	2	–	1	2	–	3	–	3
Saint Paul (VA)	2	–	5	–	1	2	–	5	–	1
Virginia Union	2	–	5	–	1	2	–	5	–	1
Lincoln (PA)	1	–	4	–	0	1	–	4	–	0
St. Augustine's	0	–	4	–	0	0	–	4	–	0
Howard	0	–	4	–	0	0	–	5	–	0
$ – Conference champion; Conference standings were based on the Dickinson System.

1936 Dixie Conference football standings
	Conf.					Overall
Team	W		L		T	W		L		T
Howard (AL) $	4	–	1	–	1	5	–	3	–	1
Southwestern (TN)	3	–	1	–	1	7	–	2	–	1
Chattanooga	3	–	1	–	1	5	–	2	–	1
Birmingham–Southern	4	–	3	–	0	4	–	5	–	0
Mississippi College	2	–	2	–	0	5	–	3	–	1
Loyola (LA)	2	–	2	–	0	4	–	6	–	0
Millsaps	2	–	3	–	0	3	–	5	–	2
Mercer	0	–	2	–	1	3	–	6	–	1
Spring Hill	0	–	5	–	0	3	–	6	–	0
$ – Conference champion

1936 Eastern Pennsylvania Collegiate Conference football standings
	Conf.					Overall
Team	W		L		T	W		L		T
Franklin & Marshall $	3	–	0	–	1	7	–	1	–	1
Ursinus	2	–	0	–	2	3	–	4	–	2
Dickinson	1	–	2	–	1	4	–	4	–	1
Muhlenberg	1	–	2	–	1	2	–	6	–	1
Gettysburg	0	–	3	–	1	3	–	4	–	1
$ – Conference champion

1936 Far Western Conference football standings
	Conf.					Overall
Team	W		L		T	W		L		T
Pacific (CA) $	4	–	0	–	0	5	–	4	–	1
Fresno State	2	–	1	–	0	5	–	3	–	1
Nevada	2	–	2	–	0	4	–	4	–	0
Cal Aggies	1	–	2	–	0	3	–	4	–	0
Chico State	0	–	4	–	0	1	–	6	–	1
$ – Conference champion

1936 Illinois Intercollegiate Athletic Conference football standings
	Conf.					Overall
Team	W		L		T	W		L		T
Illinois Wesleyan +	5	–	0	–	1	5	–	3	–	1
St. Viator +	3	–	0	–	0	5	–	2	–	0
Bradley	6	–	2	–	0	6	–	3	–	0
North Central	3	–	1	–	1	4	–	2	–	1
Lake Forest	2	–	1	–	0	4	–	2	–	1
Wheaton (IL)	2	–	1	–	2	3	–	2	–	2
Southern Illinois	3	–	2	–	1	2	–	7	–	0
Western Illinois	3	–	2	–	1	3	–	2	–	2
Northern Illinois State	3	–	2	–	1	4	–	3	–	1
Illinois College	2	–	2	–	1	4	–	3	–	1
Monmouth (IL)	2	–	2	–	0	4	–	4	–	0
Augustana (IL)	3	–	3	–	0	3	–	5	–	0
Illinois State Normal	2	–	3	–	1	3	–	4	–	2
Millikin	2	–	4	–	0	3	–	5	–	0
Eastern Illinois	2	–	4	–	0	4	–	4	–	0
Knox (IL)	1	–	2	–	0	3	–	5	–	0
Eureka	2	–	5	–	1	2	–	5	–	1
Elmhurst	1	–	3	–	1	3	–	3	–	1
Carthage	1	–	4	–	1	2	–	5	–	1
Shurtleff	0	–	1	–	0	0	–	4	–	0
McKendree	0	–	4	–	0	2	–	6	–	0
+ – Conference co-champions

1936 Indiana Intercollegiate Conference football standings
	Conf.					Overall
Team	W		L		T	W		L		T
Butler $	5	–	0	–	0	6	–	0	–	2
Indiana State	2	–	0	–	1	2	–	3	–	2
Wabash	6	–	1	–	0	7	–	1	–	0
Saint Joseph's (IN)	3	–	1	–	1	3	–	1	–	1
Central Normal	4	–	2	–	0	4	–	3	–	0
DePauw	3	–	2	–	2	3	–	3	–	2
Manchester	5	–	3	–	0	5	–	3	–	0
Ball State	3	–	3	–	1	3	–	4	–	1
Franklin (IN)	3	–	4	–	0	3	–	5	–	0
Evansville	2	–	3	–	2	3	–	3	–	2
Valparaiso	1	–	3	–	1	1	–	6	–	1
Hanover	1	–	3	–	0	1	–	6	–	0
Earlham	1	–	4	–	0	2	–	4	–	1
Rose Poly	1	–	5	–	0	2	–	5	–	0
Oakland City	0	–	6	–	0	0	–	8	–	0
$ – Conference champion

1936 Iowa Conference football standings
	Conf.					Overall
Team	W		L		T	W		L		T
Parsons $	6	–	0	–	0	6	–	1	–	2
St. Ambrose	4	–	0	–	1	8	–	0	–	1
Buena Vista	4	–	1	–	0	7	–	2	–	0
Luther	4	–	1	–	0	5	–	4	–	0
Upper Iowa	4	–	2	–	0	4	–	3	–	0
Central (IA)	4	–	3	–	0	4	–	5	–	0
Iowa Wesleyan	3	–	3	–	1	5	–	3	–	1
Simpson (IA)	2	–	4	–	0	3	–	6	–	0
Columbia (IA)	1	–	4	–	0	3	–	4	–	0
Western Union	0	–	2	–	0	2	–	6	–	0
Dubuque	0	–	6	–	0	1	–	6	–	1
Penn (IA)	0	–	6	–	0	0	–	7	–	0
$ – Conference champion

1936 Kansas Collegiate Athletic Conference football standings
	Conf.					Overall
Team	W		L		T	W		L		T
Kansas Wesleyan $	4	–	0	–	1	7	–	1	–	1
McPherson	3	–	1	–	1	5	–	3	–	1
Bethany (KS)	3	–	1	–	1	4	–	2	–	2
Ottawa	1	–	2	–	2	3	–	4	–	2
Baker	1	–	4	–	0	2	–	6	–	0
College of Emporia	0	–	4	–	1	5	–	4	–	1
$ – Conference champion

1936 Kentucky Intercollegiate Athletic Conference football standings
	Conf.					Overall
Team	W		L		T	W		L		T
Western Kentucky State Teachers +	2	–	0	–	0	7	–	2	–	0
Centre +	2	–	0	–	0	5	–	4	–	0
Morehead State	3	–	1	–	2	4	–	1	–	2
Eastern Kentucky	4	–	2	–	0	7	–	2	–	0
Murray State	2	–	1	–	0	5	–	4	–	0
Louisville	2	–	2	–	0	4	–	4	–	0
Georgetown (KY)	1	–	3	–	1	2	–	5	–	1
Transylvania	0	–	3	–	1	3	–	4	–	1
Union (KY)	0	–	3	–	2	2	–	4	–	2
+ – Conference co-champions

1936 Lone Star Conference football standings
	Conf.					Overall
Team	W		L		T	W		L		T
North Texas State $	4	–	0	–	0	6	–	2	–	1
East Texas State	3	–	1	–	0	8	–	2	–	0
Stephen F. Austin	2	–	2	–	0	4	–	3	–	1
Southwest Texas State	1	–	3	–	0	3	–	5	–	1
Sam Houston State	0	–	4	–	0	2	–	7	–	0
$ – Conference champion

1936 Michigan Intercollegiate Athletic Association football standings
	Conf.					Overall
Team	W		L		T	W		L		T
Kalamazoo $	7	–	0	–	1	7	–	0	–	1
Alma	5	–	2	–	1	5	–	2	–	1
Hope	5	–	2	–	1	5	–	2	–	1
Albion	2	–	4	–	2	2	–	5	–	2
Hillsdale	2	–	5	–	1	4	–	5	–	1
Olivet	0	–	8	–	0	0	–	8	–	0
$ – Conference champion

1936 Middle Atlantic Athletic Association football standings
	Conf.					Overall
Team	W		L		T	W		L		T
Cheyney $	3	–	0	–	1	4	–	1	–	1
Bordentown	3	–	1	–	0	?	–	?	–	?
Storer	2	–	1	–	0	?	–	?	–	?
Downingtown	2	–	2	–	0	?	–	?	–	?
Delaware State	2	–	3	–	0	2	–	5	–	0
Princess Anne	0	–	2	–	0	?	–	?	–	?
Bowie	0	–	3	–	0	?	–	?	–	?
$ – Conference champion

1936 Middle Three Conference football standings
	Conf.					Overall
Team	W		L		T	W		L		T
Lehigh $	2	–	0	–	0	6	–	2	–	0
Rutgers	0	–	1	–	0	1	–	6	–	1
Lafayette	0	–	1	–	0	1	–	8	–	0
$ – Conference champion

1936 Midwest Athletic Association football standings
	Conf.					Overall
Team	W		L		T	W		L		T
West Virginia State +	3	–	0	–	1	7	–	0	–	1
Wilberforce +	3	–	0	–	1	6	–	1	–	1
Kentucky State	1	–	2	–	1	3	–	2	–	3
Lincoln (MO)	0	–	2	–	1	1	–	6	–	1
Louisville Municipal	0	–	3	–	0	4	–	3	–	0
+ – Conference co-champions

1936 Midwest Conference football standings
	Conf.					Overall
Team	W		L		T	W		L		T
Coe +	4	–	0	–	0	6	–	2	–	0
Carleton +	3	–	0	–	0	6	–	1	–	0
Lawrence	3	–	2	–	0	3	–	4	–	0
Cornell (IA)	3	–	3	–	0	3	–	4	–	2
Ripon	2	–	2	–	0	3	–	3	–	1
Knox	2	–	3	–	0	3	–	5	–	0
Monmouth (IL)	1	–	3	–	0	4	–	4	–	0
Beloit	0	–	5	–	0	0	–	6	–	1
+ – Conference co-champions

1936 Minnesota Intercollegiate Athletic Conference football standings
	Conf.					Overall
Team	W		L		T	W		L		T
Gustavus Adolphus +	5	–	0	–	0	5	–	1	–	0
Saint John's (MN) +	4	–	0	–	0	5	–	2	–	0
Concordia (MN)	3	–	2	–	0	3	–	5	–	0
St. Olaf	2	–	2	–	0	3	–	3	–	1
Hamline	1	–	3	–	0	1	–	6	–	0
Saint Mary's (MN)	1	–	3	–	0	1	–	8	–	0
Macalester	1	–	4	–	0	1	–	6	–	0
St. Thomas (MN)	1	–	4	–	0	1	–	7	–	0
+ – Conference co-champions

1936 Missouri College Athletic Union football standings
	Conf.					Overall
Team	W		L		T	W		L		T
Missouri Valley +	3	–	1	–	0	5	–	3	–	0
William Jewell +	3	–	1	–	0	4	–	3	–	0
Tarkio	2	–	1	–	0	4	–	3	–	1
Culver–Stockton	1	–	2	–	0	5	–	4	–	0
Central (MO)	0	–	4	–	0	0	–	9	–	0
+ – Conference co-champions

1936 Missouri Intercollegiate Athletic Association football standings
	Conf.					Overall
Team	W		L		T	W		L		T
Kirksville $	5	–	0	–	0	7	–	0	–	0
Warrensburg	4	–	1	–	0	6	–	2	–	0
Cape Girardeau	3	–	2	–	0	4	–	5	–	0
Maryville (MO)	1	–	3	–	1	4	–	4	–	1
Rolla	0	–	3	–	2	1	–	4	–	2
Springfield (MO)	0	–	4	–	1	1	–	5	–	2
$ – Conference champion

1936 Missouri Valley Conference football standings
	Conf.					Overall
Team	W		L		T	W		L		T
Creighton +	3	–	0	–	0	4	–	4	–	0
Tulsa +	3	–	0	–	0	5	–	2	–	2
Drake	3	–	2	–	0	4	–	4	–	2
Washington University	1	–	1	–	0	3	–	7	–	0
Oklahoma A&M	1	–	2	–	0	1	–	9	–	0
Washburn	1	–	4	–	0	2	–	6	–	1
Grinnell	0	–	3	–	0	2	–	7	–	0
+ – Conference co-champions; Rankings from AP Poll

1936 Nebraska College Athletic Conference football standings
	Conf.					Overall
Team	W		L		T	W		L		T
Hastings $	4	–	0	–	0	8	–	1	–	0
Nebraska Wesleyan	3	–	1	–	0	5	–	3	–	0
Midland	2	–	2	–	0	5	–	3	–	0
York (NE)	1	–	3	–	0	6	–	3	–	0
Doane	0	–	4	–	0	0	–	5	–	2
$ – Conference champion

1936 Nebraska Intercollegiate Athletic Association football standings
	Conf.					Overall
Team	W		L		T	W		L		T
Kearney State $	3	–	0	–	0	7	–	2	–	0
Chadron State	2	–	1	–	0	4	–	3	–	0
Peru State	1	–	2	–	0	2	–	5	–	1
Wayne State (NE)	0	–	3	–	0	3	–	8	–	0
$ – Conference champion

1936 New England Conference football standings
	Conf.					Overall
Team	W		L		T	W		L		T
Connecticut State $	2	–	0	–	0	7	–	2	–	0
Maine	1	–	1	–	0	4	–	3	–	0
Rhode Island State	1	–	2	–	0	5	–	4	–	0
New Hampshire	0	–	1	–	0	3	–	3	–	2
$ – Conference champion

1936 North Central Conference football standings
	Conf.					Overall
Team	W		L		T	W		L		T
North Dakota $	4	–	0	–	0	9	–	2	–	0
South Dakota	3	–	1	–	0	4	–	3	–	2
North Dakota Agricultural	2	–	2	–	0	4	–	5	–	0
Morningside	2	–	3	–	0	3	–	4	–	0
Omaha	1	–	2	–	2	2	–	3	–	2
Iowa State Teachers	1	–	2	–	1	5	–	2	–	2
South Dakota State	1	–	4	–	1	3	–	6	–	1
$ – Conference champion

1936 North Dakota Intercollegiate Conference football standings
	Conf.					Overall
Team	W		L		T	W		L		T
Wahpeton $	6	–	0	–	0	6	–	1	–	0
Minot State	5	–	1	–	0	5	–	3	–	0
Jamestown	2	–	1	–	1	4	–	3	–	1
Dickinson State	2	–	3	–	0	2	–	3	–	1
Valley City State	2	–	5	–	0	2	–	6	–	0
Bottineau	1	–	3	–	1	?	–	?	–	?
Ellendale	1	–	3	–	1	2	–	4	–	1
Mayville State	0	–	3	–	1	1	–	4	–	1
$ – Conference champion

1936 North State Conference football standings
	Conf.					Overall
Team	W		L		T	W		L		T
Elon $	3	–	0	–	0	6	–	5	–	0
Appalachian State	3	–	1	–	0	5	–	2	–	2
Catawba	3	–	2	–	0	5	–	5	–	0
Lenoir Rhyne	2	–	3	–	0	3	–	6	–	1
Western Carolina	1	–	2	–	0	2	–	7	–	0
Guilford	0	–	4	–	0	2	–	7	–	0
$ – Conference champion

1936 Northern Teachers College Conference football standings
	Conf.					Overall
Team	W		L		T	W		L		T
St. Cloud State $	4	–	0	–	0	6	–	0	–	1
Duluth State	2	–	1	–	0	4	–	1	–	0
Mankato State	2	–	1	–	0	5	–	2	–	0
Moorhead State	2	–	1	–	0	4	–	3	–	0
Bemidji State	1	–	4	–	0	3	–	4	–	0
Winona State	0	–	4	–	0	2	–	5	–	1
$ – Conference champion

1936 Northwest Conference football standings
	Conf.					Overall
Team	W		L		T	W		L		T
Willamette $	6	–	0	–	0	7	–	2	–	1
Puget Sound	3	–	1	–	1	4	–	3	–	1
Whitman	3	–	2	–	1	4	–	3	–	1
Linfield	3	–	2	–	1	3	–	3	–	2
College of Idaho	1	–	2	–	1	4	–	4	–	1
Pacific (OR)	1	–	5	–	0	2	–	7	–	0
Albany (OR)	0	–	5	–	0	1	–	7	–	0
$ – Conference champion

1936 Ohio Athletic Conference football standings
	Conf.					Overall
Team	W		L		T	W		L		T
Marietta $	4	–	0	–	0	5	–	2	–	0
Baldwin–Wallace	3	–	0	–	0	7	–	1	–	0
Akron	5	–	1	–	1	6	–	2	–	1
Mount Union	4	–	1	–	1	7	–	1	–	1
Case	4	–	1	–	0	5	–	4	–	0
Muskingum	6	–	2	–	0	6	–	3	–	0
Ohio Northern	4	–	2	–	2	4	–	2	–	2
Bowling Green	2	–	1	–	3	4	–	2	–	3
Wittenberg	4	–	2	–	0	4	–	5	–	0
Capital	3	–	2	–	1	4	–	2	–	1
Kent State	4	–	3	–	0	5	–	4	–	0
Toledo	2	–	2	–	0	2	–	6	–	0
Heidelberg	3	–	4	–	1	3	–	4	–	1
Denison	2	–	3	–	1	2	–	4	–	1
Wooster	3	–	5	–	0	3	–	6	–	0
Kenyon	1	–	3	–	0	3	–	4	–	0
Ashland	2	–	6	–	0	2	–	6	–	0
Oberlin	1	–	4	–	0	3	–	5	–	0
John Carroll	1	–	4	–	0	2	–	7	–	0
Findlay	0	–	5	–	0	0	–	7	–	0
Otterbein	0	–	7	–	0	1	–	7	–	0
$ – Conference champion

1936 Oklahoma Collegiate Conference football standings
	Conf.					Overall
Team	W		L		T	W		L		T
Central State Teachers $	6	–	0	–	0	8	–	1	–	0
Northeastern State	4	–	1	–	1	6	–	2	–	1
SE Oklahoma State	3	–	3	–	0	4	–	7	–	0
East Central	2	–	3	–	0	5	–	4	–	0
Oklahoma Baptist	1	–	2	–	1	4	–	4	–	2
NW Oklahoma State	1	–	4	–	0	1	–	7	–	0
SW Oklahoma State	0	–	4	–	2	1	–	7	–	3
$ – Conference champion

1936 Pennsylvania State Teachers Conference football standings
	Conf.					Overall
Team	W		L		T	W		L		T
Lock Haven $	6	–	0	–	2	6	–	0	–	2
Shippensburg	6	–	1	–	0	7	–	1	–	0
Mansfield	4	–	1	–	0	4	–	3	–	0
Slippery Rock	3	–	1	–	0	6	–	3	–	0
Indiana (PA)	4	–	2	–	1	4	–	2	–	1
West Chester	1	–	1	–	0	4	–	4	–	1
Kutztown	1	–	1	–	1	5	–	2	–	1
California (PA)	3	–	4	–	0	3	–	4	–	1
Edinboro	1	–	3	–	0	1	–	4	–	0
Millersville	1	–	4	–	0	3	–	4	–	0
Bloomsburg	1	–	6	–	0	1	–	7	–	0
East Stroudsburg	0	–	3	–	0	2	–	6	–	0
Clarion	0	–	4	–	0	0	–	6	–	0
$ – Conference champion

1936 Smoky Mountain Conference football standings
	Conf.					Overall
Team	W		L		T	W		L		T
Carson–Newman $	7	–	0	–	0	10	–	0	–	0
Appalachian State $	4	–	0	–	0	8	–	1	–	0
Maryville (TN)	4	–	2	–	0	5	–	5	–	0
East Tennessee State Teachers	4	–	3	–	0	5	–	3	–	0
Milligan	3	–	3	–	0	5	–	4	–	0
King	3	–	3	–	0	5	–	5	–	0
Cumberland (TN)	1	–	3	–	0	3	–	6	–	1
Tusculum	0	–	6	–	0	2	–	7	–	0
Western Carolina	0	–	6	–	0	2	–	7	–	0
$ – Conference champion

1936 South Dakota Intercollegiate Conference football standings
	Conf.					Overall
Team	W		L		T	W		L		T
Augustana (SD) +	4	–	0	–	0	8	–	1	–	0
Dakota Wesleyan +	5	–	0	–	1	5	–	2	–	1
Northern Normal	4	–	2	–	0	6	–	2	–	0
Spearfish	2	–	1	–	1	5	–	1	–	1
Yankton	3	–	2	–	1	4	–	3	–	1
Southern Normal	2	–	2	–	0	5	–	2	–	0
Huron	2	–	4	–	0	3	–	5	–	0
South Dakota Mines	1	–	3	–	0	1	–	6	–	1
Eastern Normal	0	–	4	–	0	0	–	5	–	0
Sioux Falls	0	–	5	–	1	0	–	7	–	1
+ – Conference co-champions

1936 Southern California Conference football standings
	Conf.					Overall
Team	W		L		T	W		L		T
San Diego State $	5	–	0	–	0	6	–	1	–	1
Santa Barbara State	4	–	1	–	0	9	–	1	–	0
Whittier	3	–	2	–	0	5	–	5	–	0
Redlands	2	–	3	–	0	2	–	6	–	0
Occidental	1	–	4	–	0	3	–	5	–	1
La Verne	0	–	5	–	0	1	–	7	–	0
$ – Conference champion

1936 Southern Intercollegiate Athletic Association football standings
	Conf.					Overall
Team	W		L		T	W		L		T
Middle Tennessee State Teachers +	4	–	0	–	0	7	–	1	–	0
The Citadel +	4	–	0	–	0	4	–	6	–	0
Miami (FL)	3	–	0	–	0	6	–	2	–	2
Centenary	2	–	0	–	0	6	–	4	–	2
Centre	2	–	0	–	0	5	–	4	–	0
Howard (AL)	2	–	0	–	1	5	–	3	–	1
Union (TN)	5	–	1	–	1	6	–	4	–	1
Rollins	4	–	1	–	0	7	–	1	–	0
Louisiana Tech	4	–	1	–	1	6	–	2	–	1
Morehead State	4	–	1	–	2	4	–	1	–	2
Eastern Kentucky	4	–	2	–	0	7	–	2	–	0
Mississippi State Teachers	4	–	2	–	1	7	–	2	–	1
Mississippi College	2	–	1	–	1	5	–	3	–	1
Western Kentucky State Teachers	3	–	2	–	0	6	–	3	–	0
Erskine	3	–	2	–	0	4	–	5	–	0
Presbyterian	3	–	2	–	0	3	–	6	–	0
Louisiana Normal	3	–	2	–	1	5	–	4	–	1
Murray State	4	–	4	–	0	5	–	4	–	0
Mercer	1	–	1	–	1	3	–	6	–	1
Louisiana College	2	–	3	–	1	3	–	4	–	1
Louisville	2	–	3	–	0	4	–	4	–	0
Millsaps	1	–	2	–	2	3	–	5	–	2
Transylvania	1	–	3	–	1	3	–	4	–	1
Tennessee Tech	1	–	5	–	0	2	–	5	–	1
Georgetown (KY)	1	–	5	–	1	2	–	5	–	1
Loyola (LA)	0	–	1	–	0	4	–	6	–	0
Stetson	0	–	3	–	1	2	–	5	–	1
Union (KY)	0	–	3	–	2	2	–	4	–	2
SW Louisiana	0	–	4	–	1	2	–	7	–	1
Wofford	0	–	4	–	1	1	–	7	–	1
Newberry	0	–	4	–	1	1	–	10	–	1
West Tennessee State Teachers	0	–	7	–	0	0	–	9	–	0
+ – Conference co-champions

1936 Southern Intercollegiate Athletic Conference football standings
	Conf.					Overall
Team	W		L		T	W		L		T
Tuskegee $	4	–	2	–	0	7	–	5	–	0
Alabama State	3	–	2	–	2	5	–	2	–	3
Morehouse	4	–	1	–	2	4	–	2	–	2
Florida A&M	2	–	2	–	1	2	–	4	–	1
Morris Brown	2	–	1	–	2	5	–	1	–	2
LeMoyne	4	–	2	–	0	5	–	2	–	0
Lane	2	–	1	–	1	6	–	1	–	2
Xavier (LA)	2	–	1	–	0	6	–	5	–	0
Knoxville	2	–	2	–	0	4	–	3	–	0
Talladega	1	–	2	–	0	2	–	2	–	1
Clark (GA)	2	–	5	–	0	2	–	6	–	0
South Carolina State	0	–	2	–	1	3	–	3	–	2
Fisk	0	–	5	–	1	0	–	6	–	1
$ – Conference champion; Standings were based on Dickinson System ratings. Tuskegee and Alabama both had a rating of 24.00. Tuskegee was awarded the conference championship based on a head-to-head win over Alabama State.

1936 Southwestern Athletic Conference football standings
	Conf.					Overall
Team	W		L		T	W		L		T
Texas College +	4	–	1	–	1	5	–	2	–	2
Langston +	4	–	1	–	1	7	–	1	–	1
Wiley	3	–	2	–	1	6	–	3	–	1
Bishop	2	–	2	–	2	2	–	3	–	2
Arkansas AM&N	2	–	3	–	1	5	–	4	–	1
Prairie View	1	–	3	–	2	4	–	4	–	2
Southern	1	–	5	–	0	3	–	5	–	1
+ – Conference co-champions

1936 Texas Conference football standings
	Conf.					Overall
Team	W		L		T	W		L		T
Howard Payne $	5	–	0	–	1	7	–	2	–	1
Daniel Baker	5	–	1	–	0	7	–	2	–	2
McMurry	5	–	1	–	1	8	–	1	–	1
Austin	3	–	3	–	0	4	–	4	–	2
Southwestern (TX)	1	–	4	–	1	4	–	6	–	1
Abilene Christian	1	–	4	–	1	1	–	7	–	1
St. Edward's	1	–	4	–	0	1	–	5	–	1
Trinity (TX)	0	–	4	–	2	0	–	6	–	3
$ – Conference champion

1936 Tri-State Intercollegiate Conference football standings
	Conf.					Overall
Team	W		L		T	W		L		T
Wisconsin Mines $	4	–	0	–	1	4	–	0	–	1
Aurora	3	–	1	–	0	4	–	3	–	0
Wartburg	2	–	1	–	0	3	–	4	–	0
Northwestern (WI)	2	–	3	–	0	3	–	3	–	0
Milton	1	–	3	–	1	2	–	3	–	1
Mission House	0	–	4	–	0	0	–	4	–	0
$ – Conference champion

1936 West Virginia Athletic Conference football standings
	Conf.					Overall
Team	W		L		T	W		L		T
West Liberty State $	6	–	0	–	1	6	–	1	–	1
West Virginia Wesleyan	4	–	0	–	0	8	–	2	–	0
Concord	5	–	2	–	0	6	–	2	–	0
Glenville State	4	–	2	–	0	5	–	2	–	0
Salem	3	–	3	–	1	3	–	4	–	1
Potomac State	1	–	2	–	1	1	–	3	–	1
Fairmont State	2	–	6	–	0	2	–	6	–	1
Shepherd	0	–	3	–	1	1	–	5	–	1
Morris Harvey	0	–	8	–	0	0	–	11	–	0
Bethany (WV) *	2	–	0	–	0	6	–	2	–	0
Marshall *	1	–	1	–	0	6	–	3	–	1
Davis & Elkins *	1	–	1	–	0	3	–	6	–	1
New River State	1	–	2	–	0	4	–	2	–	0
$ – Conference champion; * – Did not qualify for conference standings Ties did not count in conference standings.

1936 Wisconsin State Teachers College Conference football standings
	Conf.					Overall
Team	W		L		T	W		L		T
Northern Division
Superior State x	4	–	0	–	0	6	–	2	–	0
Eau Claire State	2	–	1	–	1	3	–	2	–	2
La Crosse State	1	–	1	–	2	2	–	2	–	4
River Falls State	1	–	3	–	0	4	–	3	–	0
Stout Institute	0	–	3	–	1	0	–	5	–	1
Southern Division
Stevens Point State x	2	–	1	–	1	3	–	3	–	1
Whitewater State	2	–	2	–	0	4	–	2	–	0
Oshkosh State	1	–	1	–	2	3	–	3	–	2
Milwaukee State	2	–	2	–	0	3	–	6	–	0
Platteville State	1	–	2	–	1	3	–	2	–	1
x – Division champion/co-champions

== Bowl games ==
Bowl game	Winning team		Losing team	
Rose Bowl	No. 3 Pittsburgh	21	No. 5 Washington	0
Sugar Bowl	No. 6 Santa Clara	21	No. 2 LSU	14
Orange Bowl	No. 14 Duquesne	13	Mississippi State	12
Cotton Bowl Classic	No. 16 TCU	16	No. 20 Marquette	6
Sun Bowl	Hardin–Simmons	34	Texas Mines	6
Bacardi Bowl	Auburn	7	Villanova	7

"There is no longer any blot left on Pittsburgh's Rose Bowl escutcheon," wrote Grantland Rice. "Here was a Panther who belonged to the jungle and not to the zoo-- a fast, hard driving slashing Panther who put both fang and claw to work in beating Washington's Huskies 21 to 0 before 87,200 chilly witnesses."

Pittsburgh had been ranked No. 3 by the AP, behind No. 2 LSU, which met Santa Clara in the Sugar Bowl. No. 1 ranked Minnesota, like other Big Ten Conference teams, was not allowed to play postseason. LSU had lost the previous Sugar Bowl to TCU, by a 3–2 score. A crowd of 41,000 turned out in New Orleans to see the Tigers lose again. The Santa Clara Broncos took a 14–0 lead in the first quarter and won 21–14.

A crowd of 17,000 turned out in Dallas to watch the first Cotton Bowl. Sammy Baugh of TCU completed only 5 of 13 pass attempts, but had 110 yards and a touchdown as TCU beat Marquette, 16–6.

In the first annual Orange Bowl, 12,000 filled the stands in Miami to see the Duquesne Dukes beat the Mississippi State Maroons, 13–12. Boyd Brumbaugh scored Duquesne's first touchdown and made the only extra point by either side.

Villanova tied Auburn, 7–7, in the Bacardi Bowl, played before 6,000 spectators in Havana, Cuba, Tuskegee beat Prairie View State, 6–0, in Houston before 3,000, and Hardin–Simmons beat Texas Mines, 34–6, at the Sun Bowl in El Paso, Texas.

== Heisman Trophy ==
1935 had been the first year that the Heisman Trophy was ever awarded, although it was named differently in the first year. It was known simply as the "DAC Trophy" for its inaugural year. In 1936, John Heisman died and the trophy that is awarded to the best college football player in the US was renamed in his honor. Larry Kelley, the second winner of the award was the first man to win it officially named as the "Heisman Trophy."

Voting

Player	School	Position	Total
Larry Kelley	Yale	E	213
Sam Francis	Nebraska	HB	47
Ray Buivid	Marquette	HB	46
Sammy Baugh	TCU	QB	40
Clint Frank	Yale	HB/QB	33
Ace Parker	Duke	HB	28
Ed Widseth	Minnesota	OT	25

== The Slippery Rock National Championship ==
There was significant debate over who would be recognized as the national champion in 1936. Thus, a number of sportswriters across the country began to nominate several small colleges based on wins over the national championship contenders via the transitive property. Essentially, the small college of choice would have beaten a team which had defeated another team which in turn defeated one or several of the legitimate national championship contenders. These were Minnesota (consensus), Pitt (BS, CFRA, HS), Duke (SR, WS), and LSU (BQPRS).

The most prominent claim for the national championship via transitive property was Slippery Rock College, which was given a claim because they had beaten Westminster College of Pennsylvania, which defeated West Virginia Wesleyan, which beat No. 14 Duquesne, which upset No. 3 Pitt, which beat former No. 1 Notre Dame, which upset former No. 1 Northwestern, which defeated AP national champion Minnesota. The claim gave Slippery Rock wide notoriety throughout the country, and is why certain football teams, most notably Michigan and Texas, have occasionally broadcast the score of a Slippery Rock game during halftime.

Other claims to the 1936 national championship by this method were also made by Saint Vincent College of Latrobe, Pennsylvania, which followed the majority of Slippery Rock's line of successive wins, beating West Virginia Wesleyan 6 to 0 earlier in the 1936 season. A case was made for Indiana State Teachers College as well, as they tied Lock Haven, who beat West Chester, which defeated Waynesburg, which connected to the Slippery Rock and St. Vincent's claims by defeating West Virginia Wesleyan 14 to 7. A week before Thanksgiving, St. Thomas College of Pennsylvania was given national championship recognition after defeating Saint Vincent, 13 to 6.

== See also ==
- 1936 College Football All-America Team
