= 1936 Iowa State Teachers Panthers football team =

American college football season

1936 Iowa State Teachers Panthers football
- Conference: North Central Conference
- Record: 5–2–2 (1–2–1 NCC)
- Head coach: Clyde Starbeck (1st season)
- Home stadium: O. R. Latham Stadium

1936 North Central Conference football standings
	Conf.					Overall
Team	W		L		T	W		L		T
North Dakota $	4	–	0	–	0	9	–	2	–	0
South Dakota	3	–	1	–	0	4	–	3	–	2
North Dakota Agricultural	2	–	2	–	0	4	–	5	–	0
Morningside	2	–	3	–	0	3	–	4	–	0
Omaha	1	–	2	–	2	2	–	3	–	2
Iowa State Teachers	1	–	2	–	1	5	–	2	–	2
South Dakota State	1	–	4	–	1	3	–	6	–	1
$ – Conference champion

The 1936 Iowa State Teachers Panthers football team was an American football team that represented Iowa State Teachers College (now known as the University of Northern Iowa) as a member of the North Central Conference during the 1936 college football season. In its first season under head coach Clyde Starbeck, the team compiled a 5–2–2 record (1–2–1 against NCC opponents) and finished in sixth place out of seven teams in the NCC.

Three players won all-conference honors: end Paul Jones; center Melvin Nelson; and tackle Bernard Schmidt.

The team played its home games at O. R. Latham Stadium in Cedar Falls, Iowa.

== Schedule ==
Date	Opponent	Site	Result	Attendance	Source
September 26	at Iowa State*	State Field; Ames, IA	T 0–0	2,973	
October 1	vs. Grinnell*	Sloane Wallace Field; Waterloo, IA	W 24–0	2,500	
October 9	at North Dakota	Memorial Stadium; Grand Forks, ND	L 0–19		
October 17	Coe*	O. R. Latham Stadium; Cedar Falls, IA	W 21–0	2,500	
October 24	at Western State*	Western State Teachers College Field; Kalamazoo, MI	W 12–6		
October 31	Haskell*	O. R. Latham Stadium; Cedar Falls, IA	W 21–0	2,500	
November 7	at South Dakota State	State Field; Brookings, SD	L 0–13		
November 14	Morningside	O. R. Latham Stadium; Cedar Falls, IA	W 6–0	3,500	
November 20	at Omaha	Omaha, NE	T 7–7		
*Non-conference game
