= 1936 Cal Poly Mustangs football team =

American college football season

1936 Cal Poly Mustangs football
- Conference: Independent
- Record: 5–4
- Head coach: Howie O'Daniels (4th season)
- Home stadium: Mustang Stadium

1936 Western college football independents records
	Conf.			Overall
Team	W	L	T	W		L		T
No. 6 Santa Clara		–		8	–	1	–	0
Humboldt State		–		6	–	3	–	0
Loyola (CA)		–		6	–	3	–	0
Saint Mary's		–		6	–	3	–	1
Gonzaga		–		5	–	3	–	0
Pomona		–		6	–	4	–	0
Cal Poly		–		5	–	4	–	0
San Jose State		–		5	–	4	–	0
Idaho Southern Branch		–		4	–	4	–	0
San Francisco		–		4	–	4	–	2
Portland		–		3	–	4	–	0
San Francisco State		–		2	–	3	–	1
Hawaii		–		3	–	5	–	0
Rankings from AP Poll

The 1936 Cal Poly Mustangs football team represented California Polytechnic School—now known as California Polytechnic State University, San Luis Obispo—as an independent during the 1936 college football season. Led by fourth-year head coach Howie O'Daniels, Cal Poly compiled a record of 5–4. The team outscored its opponents 96 to 76 for the season. The Mustangs played home games at Mustang Stadium in San Luis Obispo, California.

Cal Poly was a two-year school until 1941 and competed as an independent from 1929 to 1945.

== Schedule ==
Date	Opponent	Site	Result	Source
September 26	at Arizona State–Flagstaff	Skidmore Field; Flagstaff, AZ	L 0–7	
October 3	Miramonte Junior College (Note: Miramonte School and Junior College was a private school in Atascadero, California, founded in 1933 and folded in the late 1930s.)	Mustang Stadium; San Luis Obispo, CA	W 13–12	
October 17	Santa Barbara State freshmen	Mustang Stadium; San Luis Obispo, CA	W 25–0	
October 24	at Santa Clara freshmen	Santa Clara, CA	L 0–12	
October 31	Loyola (CA) freshmen	Mustang Stadium; San Luis Obispo, CA	L 6–19	
November 6	Santa Maria	Santa Maria, CA	W 14–6	
November 11	San Francisco freshmen	Mustang Stadium; San Luis Obispo, CA	L 0–14	
November 21	Salinas	Mustang Stadium; San Luis Obispo, CA	W 20–6	
November 26	Modesto	Mustang Stadium; San Luis Obispo, CA	W 18–0	
