= 1936 Hawaii Rainbows football team =

American college football season

1936 Hawaii Rainbows football
- Conference: Independent
- Record: 3–5
- Head coach: Otto Klum (16th season)
- Home stadium: Honolulu Stadium

1936 Western college football independents records
	Conf.			Overall
Team	W	L	T	W		L		T
No. 6 Santa Clara		–		8	–	1	–	0
Humboldt State		–		6	–	3	–	0
Loyola (CA)		–		6	–	3	–	0
Saint Mary's		–		6	–	3	–	1
Gonzaga		–		5	–	3	–	0
Pomona		–		6	–	4	–	0
Cal Poly		–		5	–	4	–	0
San Jose State		–		5	–	4	–	0
Idaho Southern Branch		–		4	–	4	–	0
San Francisco		–		4	–	4	–	2
Portland		–		3	–	4	–	0
San Francisco State		–		2	–	3	–	1
Hawaii		–		3	–	5	–	0
Rankings from AP Poll

The 1936 Hawaii Rainbows football team represented the University of Hawaiʻi (now known as the University of Hawaiʻi at Mānoa) as an independent during the 1936 college football season. Led by 16th-year head coach Otto Klum, the Rainbows compiled an overall record of 3–5.

== Schedule ==
Date	Opponent	Site	Result	Attendance	Source
October 2	McKinley High School alumni	Honolulu Stadium; Honolulu, Territory of Hawaii	L 0–26	10,000	
October 9	Honolulu Town Team	Honolulu Stadium; Honolulu, Territory of Hawaii	L 6–13	8,500	
October 16	Kamehameha alumni	Honolulu Stadium; Honolulu, Territory of Hawaii	L 13–20	5,000	
October 23	McKinley High School alumni	Honolulu Stadium; Honolulu, Territory of Hawaii	W 13–0	3,500	
October 30	Kamehameha alumni	Honolulu Stadium; Honolulu, Territory of Hawaii	L 12–18	5,000	
December 2	Honolulu Town Team	Honolulu Stadium; Honolulu, Territory of Hawaii	W 12–7	6,000	
December 11	San Jose State	Honolulu Stadium; Honolulu, Territory of Hawaii (rivalry)	L 8–13	17,000	
January 2, 1937	Honolulu All-Stars	Honolulu Stadium; Honolulu, Territory of Hawaii (Poi Bowl)	W 18–12	3,000	
