= 1936 Fresno State Bulldogs football team =

American college football season

1936 Fresno State Bulldogs football
- Conference: Far Western Conference
- Record: 5–3–1 (2–1 FWC)
- Head coach: James Bradshaw (1st season)
- Home stadium: Fresno State College Stadium

1936 Far Western Conference football standings
	Conf.					Overall
Team	W		L		T	W		L		T
Pacific (CA) $	4	–	0	–	0	5	–	4	–	1
Fresno State	2	–	1	–	0	5	–	3	–	1
Nevada	2	–	2	–	0	4	–	4	–	0
Cal Aggies	1	–	2	–	0	3	–	4	–	0
Chico State	0	–	4	–	0	1	–	6	–	1
$ – Conference champion

The 1936 Fresno State Bulldogs football team represented Fresno State Normal School—now known as California State University, Fresno—during the 1936 college football season.

Fresno State competed in the Far Western Conference (FWC). (Note: The Northern California Athletic Conference (NCAC) was known as the Far Western Conference (FWC) from its founding in 1925 to 1982.) The 1936 team was led by first-year head coach James Bradshaw and played home games at Fresno State College Stadium (Note: Ratcliffe Stadium was known as Fresno State College Stadium from 1926 to 1940.) on the campus of Fresno City College in Fresno, California. They finished the season with a record of five wins, three losses and one tie (5–3–1, 2–1 FWC). The Bulldogs outscored their opponents 152–91 for the season.

== Schedule ==
Date	Opponent	Site	Result	Attendance	Source
September 26	San Francisco*	Fresno State College Stadium; Fresno, CA	L 0–14	6,169	
October 10	Whittier*	Fresno State College Stadium; Fresno, CA	W 18–0	4,533	
October 17	Arizona State–Flagstaff*	Fresno State College Stadium; Fresno, CA	W 31–6	826	
October 24	California JV*	Fresno State College Stadium; Fresno, CA	W 32–6	4,952	
October 31	Chico State	Fresno State College Stadium; Fresno, CA	W 38–0	2,558	
November 7	Willamette*	Fresno State College Stadium; Fresno, CA	T 14–14	4,132	
November 13	at Pacific (CA)	Baxter Stadium; Stockton, CA	L 0–17	7,000	
November 26	Nevada	Fresno State College Stadium; Fresno, CA	W 13–6	6,521	
December 5	vs. Hardin–Simmons*	Coyote Stadium; Wichita Falls, TX	L 6–28	2,000	
*Non-conference game
