= 1936 San Jose State Spartans football team =

American college football season

1936 San Jose State Spartans football
- Conference: Independent
- Record: 5–4
- Head coach: Dudley DeGroot (5th season)
- Home stadium: Spartan Stadium

1936 Western college football independents records
	Conf.			Overall
Team	W	L	T	W		L		T
No. 6 Santa Clara		–		8	–	1	–	0
Humboldt State		–		6	–	3	–	0
Loyola (CA)		–		6	–	3	–	0
Saint Mary's		–		6	–	3	–	1
Gonzaga		–		5	–	3	–	0
Pomona		–		6	–	4	–	0
Cal Poly		–		5	–	4	–	0
San Jose State		–		5	–	4	–	0
Idaho Southern Branch		–		4	–	4	–	0
San Francisco		–		4	–	4	–	2
Portland		–		3	–	4	–	0
San Francisco State		–		2	–	3	–	1
Hawaii		–		3	–	5	–	0
Rankings from AP Poll

The 1936 San Jose State Spartans football team represented San Jose State College. (Note: San Jose State University was known as San Jose State College from 1935 to 1971.) The Spartans were led by fifth-year head coach Dudley DeGroot and played home games at Spartan Stadium. The team played as an independent and finished with a record of five wins and four losses (5–4).

== Schedule ==
Date	Opponent	Site	Result	Attendance	Source
October 3	San Francisco	Spartan Stadium; San Jose, CA	L 0–13	5,000	
October 10	Pacific (CA)	Spartan Stadium; San Jose, CA (rivalry)	W 8–0		
October 17	Santa Clara	Spartan Stadium; San Jose, CA	L 0–20		
October 24	at San Diego State	Aztec Bowl; San Diego, CA	L 6–14	10,000	
November 7	at Humboldt State	Albee Stadium; Eureka, CA	L 0–20	2,000	
November 11	Redlands	Spartan Stadium; San Jose, CA	W 40–6		
November 26	Arizona State	Spartan Stadium; San Jose, CA	W 33–6	5,000	
December 11	at Hawaii	Honolulu Stadium; Honolulu, Territory of Hawaii (rivalry)	W 13–8	17,000–17,500	
December 11	at Kamehameha High School	Kunuiakea Stadium; Honolulu, Territory of Hawaii	W 36–6		
