= 1936 USC Trojans football team =

American college football season

1936 USC Trojans football
- Conference: Pacific Coast Conference
- Record: 4–2–3 (3–2–2 PCC)
- Head coach: Howard Jones (12th season)
- Captain: Gil Kuhn
- Home stadium: Los Angeles Memorial Coliseum

1936 Pacific Coast Conference football standings
	Conf.					Overall
Team	W		L		T	W		L		T
No. 5 Washington $	7	–	0	–	1	7	–	2	–	1
Washington State	6	–	2	–	1	6	–	3	–	1
USC	3	–	2	–	2	4	–	2	–	3
California	4	–	3	–	0	6	–	5	–	0
UCLA	4	–	3	–	1	6	–	3	–	1
Stanford	2	–	3	–	2	2	–	5	–	2
Oregon State	3	–	5	–	0	4	–	6	–	0
Montana	1	–	3	–	0	6	–	3	–	0
Oregon	1	–	6	–	1	2	–	6	–	1
Idaho	0	–	4	–	0	3	–	7	–	0
$ – Conference champion; Rankings from AP Poll

The 1936 USC Trojans football team represented the University of Southern California (USC) in the 1936 college football season. In their 12th year under head coach Howard Jones, the Trojans compiled a 4–2–3 record (3–2–2 against conference opponents), finished in third place in the Pacific Coast Conference, and outscored their opponents by a combined total of 129 to 65.

== Schedule ==
Date	Opponent	Rank	Site	Result	Attendance	Source
September 26	Oregon State		Los Angeles Memorial Coliseum; Los Angeles, CA	W 38–7	45,000	
October 3	Oregon		Los Angeles Memorial Coliseum; Los Angeles, CA	W 26–0	35,000	
October 10	at Illinois*		Memorial Stadium; Champaign, IL	W 24–6	33,325	
October 17	Washington State		Los Angeles Memorial Coliseum; Los Angeles, CA	T 0–0	25,000	
October 24	at Stanford	No. 6	Stanford Stadium; Stanford, CA (rivalry)	W 14–7	35,000	
November 7	California	No. 11	Los Angeles Memorial Coliseum; Los Angeles, CA	L 7–13	65,000	
November 14	at No. 10 Washington	No. 15	Husky Stadium; Seattle, WA	L 0–12	32,000	
November 26	UCLA		Los Angeles Memorial Coliseum; Los Angeles, CA (Victory Bell)	T 7–7	85,000	
December 5	No. 8 Notre Dame*^{†}		Los Angeles Memorial Coliseum; Los Angeles, CA (rivalry)	T 13–13	71,201	
*Non-conference game; ^{†}Homecoming; Rankings from AP Poll released prior to the game; Source:
