= 1936 Saint Mary's Gaels football team =

American college football season

1936 Saint Mary's Gaels football
- Conference: Independent
- Record: 6–3–1
- Head coach: Slip Madigan (16th season)
- Home stadium: Kezar Stadium

1936 Western college football independents records
	Conf.			Overall
Team	W	L	T	W		L		T
No. 6 Santa Clara		–		8	–	1	–	0
Humboldt State		–		6	–	3	–	0
Loyola (CA)		–		6	–	3	–	0
Saint Mary's		–		6	–	3	–	1
Gonzaga		–		5	–	3	–	0
Pomona		–		6	–	4	–	0
Cal Poly		–		5	–	4	–	0
San Jose State		–		5	–	4	–	0
Idaho Southern Branch		–		4	–	4	–	0
San Francisco		–		4	–	4	–	2
Portland		–		3	–	4	–	0
San Francisco State		–		2	–	3	–	1
Hawaii		–		3	–	5	–	0
Rankings from AP Poll

The 1936 Saint Mary's Gaels football team was an American football team that represented Saint Mary's College of California during the 1936 college football season. In their 16th season under head coach Slip Madigan, the Gaels compiled a 6–3–1 record and outscored their opponents by a combined total of 140 to 80.

Jerry Dennerlein starred at left tackle for the team. He later played in the National Football League.

== Schedule ==
Date	Opponent	Rank	Site	Result	Attendance	Source
September 27	Gonzaga		Kezar Stadium; San Francisco, CA	W 26–13	30,000	
October 3	at California		California Memorial Stadium; Berkeley, CA	W 10–0	60,000	
October 11	at Loyola (CA)		Los Angeles Memorial Coliseum; Los Angeles, CA	W 19–7	60,000	
October 18	San Francisco		Kezar Stadium; San Francisco, CA	T 0–0	35,000	
October 24	at No. 16 Fordham	No. 12	Polo Grounds; New York, NY	L 6–7	50,000	
October 30	vs. No. 10 Marquette	No. 20	Soldier Field; Chicago, IL	L 6–20	50,000–60,000	
November 7	at Idaho		Kezar Stadium; San Francisco, CA	W 26–7		
November 15	No. 9 Santa Clara		Kezar Stadium; San Francisco, CA	L 0–19	60,000	
November 26	at Pacific (CA)		Kezar Stadium; San Francisco, CA	W 34–0	12,000	
December 5	Temple		Kezar Stadium; San Francisco, CA	W 13–7	< 15,000	
Rankings from AP Poll released prior to the game
