= 1936 Texas Mines Miners football team =

American college football season

1936 Texas Mines Miners football

Sun Bowl, L 6–14 vs. Hardin–Simmons
- Conference: Border Conference
- Record: 5–3–1 (2–1–1 Border)
- Head coach: Mack Saxon (8th season)

1936 Border Conference football standings
	Conf.					Overall
Team	W		L		T	W		L		T
Arizona $	3	–	0	–	0	5	–	2	–	3
Texas Mines	2	–	1	–	1	5	–	3	–	1
New Mexico A&M	3	–	2	–	0	6	–	4	–	1
Arizona State	2	–	3	–	0	4	–	5	–	0
Arizona State–Flagstaff	1	–	2	–	1	3	–	4	–	1
New Mexico	1	–	4	–	0	2	–	7	–	0
Texas Tech	0	–	0	–	0	5	–	4	–	1
$ – Conference champion; Arizona State and Arizona State–Flagstaff played twice, but only the first meeting counted in the conference standings. The game between Arizona and Texas Tech also did not count in the conference standings.

The 1936 Texas Mines Miners football team was an American football team that represented Texas School of Mines (now known as University of Texas at El Paso) as a member of the Border Conference during the 1936 college football season. In its eighth season under head coach Mack Saxon, the team compiled a 5–3–1 record (2–1–1 against Border Conference opponents), finished second in the conference, lost to Hardin–Simmons in the first Sun Bowl game, and outscored all opponents by a total of 92 to 86.

== Schedule ==
Date	Opponent	Site	Result	Attendance	Source
September 25	at West Texas State*	Buffalo Stadium; Canyon, TX	L 7–13		
October 3	New Mexico Military*	Kidd Field; El Paso, TX	W 13–6	3,000	
October 17	New Mexico	Kidd Field; El Paso, TX	W 12–7		
October 24	at Sul Ross*	Jackson Field; Alpine, TX	W 6–0		
October 31	at Silver City Teachers*	Silver City, NM	W 21–0	1,500	
November 7	at Arizona State–Flagstaff	Skidmore Field; Flagstaff, AZ	T 0–0		
November 14	Arizona State^{†}	Kidd Field; El Paso, TX	L 0–19	4,000	
November 26	New Mexico A&M	Kidd Field; El Paso, TX (rivalry)	W 27–7	5,500	
January 1, 1937	vs. Hardin–Simmons	Jones Stadium; El Paso, TX (Sun Bowl)	L 6–34	9,000	
*Non-conference game; ^{†}Homecoming
