= 1936 UCLA Bruins football team =

American college football season

1936 UCLA Bruins football
- Conference: Pacific Coast Conference
- Record: 6–3–1 (4–3–1 PCC)
- Head coach: William H. Spaulding (12th season)
- Captain: George W. Dickerson
- Home stadium: Los Angeles Memorial Coliseum

1936 Pacific Coast Conference football standings
	Conf.					Overall
Team	W		L		T	W		L		T
No. 5 Washington $	7	–	0	–	1	7	–	2	–	1
Washington State	6	–	2	–	1	6	–	3	–	1
USC	3	–	2	–	2	4	–	2	–	3
California	4	–	3	–	0	6	–	5	–	0
UCLA	4	–	3	–	1	6	–	3	–	1
Stanford	2	–	3	–	2	2	–	5	–	2
Oregon State	3	–	5	–	0	4	–	6	–	0
Montana	1	–	3	–	0	6	–	3	–	0
Oregon	1	–	6	–	1	2	–	6	–	1
Idaho	0	–	4	–	0	3	–	7	–	0
$ – Conference champion; Rankings from AP Poll

The 1936 UCLA Bruins football team was an American football team that represented the University of California, Los Angeles during the 1936 college football season. In their 12th year under head coach William H. Spaulding, the Bruins compiled a 6–3–1 record (4–3–1 conference) and finished in fifth place in the Pacific Coast Conference, compared to a three-way tie for the first place in the previous season.

== Schedule ==
Date	Opponent	Site	Result	Attendance	Source
September 26	Occidental*	Los Angeles Memorial Coliseum; Los Angeles, CA	W 21–0	5,000	
September 26	Pomona*	Los Angeles Memorial Coliseum; Los Angeles, CA	W 26–0	5,000	
October 2	Montana	Los Angeles Memorial Coliseum; Los Angeles, CA	W 30–0	25,000	
October 10	Washington	Los Angeles Memorial Coliseum; Los Angeles, CA	L 0–14	50,000	
October 17	at California	California Memorial Stadium; Berkeley, CA (rivalry)	W 17–6	30,000	
October 24	Oregon State	Los Angeles Memorial Coliseum; Los Angeles, CA	W 22–13	26,563	
October 31	Stanford	Los Angeles Memorial Coliseum; Los Angeles, CA	L 6–19	30,000	
November 7	at Oregon	Multnomah Stadium; Portland, OR	W 7–0	10,000	
November 14	Washington State	Los Angeles Memorial Coliseum; Los Angeles, CA	L 7–32	35,000	
November 26	at USC	Los Angeles Memorial Coliseum; Los Angeles, CA (Victory Bell)	T 7–7	85,000	
*Non-conference game
