= 1936 Loyola Lions football team =

American college football season

1936 Loyola Lions football
- Conference: Independent
- Record: 6–3
- Head coach: Tom Lieb (7th season)
- Home stadium: Gilmore Stadium; Los Angeles Memorial Coliseum

1936 Western college football independents records
	Conf.			Overall
Team	W	L	T	W		L		T
No. 6 Santa Clara		–		8	–	1	–	0
Humboldt State		–		6	–	3	–	0
Loyola (CA)		–		6	–	3	–	0
Saint Mary's		–		6	–	3	–	1
Gonzaga		–		5	–	3	–	0
Pomona		–		6	–	4	–	0
Cal Poly		–		5	–	4	–	0
San Jose State		–		5	–	4	–	0
Idaho Southern Branch		–		4	–	4	–	0
San Francisco		–		4	–	4	–	2
Portland		–		3	–	4	–	0
San Francisco State		–		2	–	3	–	1
Hawaii		–		3	–	5	–	0
Rankings from AP Poll

The 1936 Loyola Lions football team was an American football team that represented Loyola University of Los Angeles (now known as Loyola Marymount University) as an independent during the 1936 college football season. In their seventh season under head coach Tom Lieb, the Lions compiled a 6–3 record.

== Schedule ==
Date	Opponent	Site	Result	Attendance	Source
September 18	Caltech	Gilmore Stadium; Los Angeles, CA	W 27–6	14,000	
September 25	Redlands	Gilmore Stadium; Los Angeles, CA	W 20–7	17,000	
October 2	Whittier	Gilmore Stadium; Los Angeles, CA	W 14–6	11,000	
October 11	Saint Mary's	Los Angeles Memorial Coliseum; Los Angeles, CA	L 7–19	60,000	
October 23	Pacific (CA)	Gilmore Stadium; Los Angeles, CA	W 7–6	> 16,000	
November 1	San Diego Marines	Gilmore Stadium; Los Angeles, CA	W 7–0	10,000	
November 11	Texas Tech	Los Angeles Memorial Coliseum; Los Angeles, CA	W 26–7	35,000	
November 22	No. 9 Santa Clara	Los Angeles Memorial Coliseum; Los Angeles, CA	L 6–13	30,000	
November 29	San Francisco	Gilmore Stadium; Los Angeles, CA	L 14–17	10,000	
Rankings from AP Poll released prior to the game
