= 1936 Arizona Wildcats football team =

American college football season

1936 Arizona Wildcats football

Border champion
- Conference: Border Conference
- Record: 5–2–3 (3–0 Border)
- Head coach: Tex Oliver (4th season)
- Home stadium: Arizona Stadium]

1936 Border Conference football standings
	Conf.					Overall
Team	W		L		T	W		L		T
Arizona $	3	–	0	–	0	5	–	2	–	3
Texas Mines	2	–	1	–	1	5	–	3	–	1
New Mexico A&M	3	–	2	–	0	6	–	4	–	1
Arizona State	2	–	3	–	0	4	–	5	–	0
Arizona State–Flagstaff	1	–	2	–	1	3	–	4	–	1
New Mexico	1	–	4	–	0	2	–	7	–	0
Texas Tech	0	–	0	–	0	5	–	4	–	1
$ – Conference champion; Arizona State and Arizona State–Flagstaff played twice, but only the first meeting counted in the conference standings. The game between Arizona and Texas Tech also did not count in the conference standings.

The 1936 Arizona Wildcats football team represented the University of Arizona in the Border Conference during the 1936 college football season. In their fourth season under head coach Tex Oliver, the Wildcats compiled an overall record of 5–2–3 record with a mark of 3–0 in conference play, winning the Border Conference title, and outscored opponents 190 to 54. The team its home games at Arizona Stadium in Tucson, Arizona.

== Schedule ==
Date	Opponent	Site	Result	Attendance	Source
September 25	BYU*	Arizona Stadium; Tucson, AZ	W 32–6	8,000	
October 3	at Utah*	Ute Stadium; Salt Lake City, UT	L 6–14		
October 10	at Arizona State	Goodwin Stadium; Tempe, AZ (rivalry)	W 18–0		
October 17	Centenary*	Arizona Stadium; Tucson, AZ	T 13–13	8,000	
October 24	New Mexico A&M^{†}	Arizona Stadium; Tucson, AZ	W 28–7		
October 31	at Kansas*	Memorial Stadium; Lawrence, KS	T 0–0		
November 7	New Mexico^{†}	Arizona Stadium; Tucson, AZ (rivalry)	W 28–0		
November 21	at Michigan State*	Macklin Field; East Lansing, MI	L 0–7		
November 28	vs. Wyoming*	Montgomery Stadium; Phoenix, AZ	W 58–0		
December 5	Texas Tech* (Note: The game between Arizona and Texas Tech did not count in the Border Conference standings.)	Arizona Stadium; Tucson, AZ	T 7–7	7,500	
*Non-conference game; ^{†}Homecoming
