= 1936 Washington State Cougars football team =

American college football season

1936 Washington State Cougars football
- Conference: Pacific Coast Conference
- Record: 6–3–1 (6–2–1 PCC)
- Head coach: Babe Hollingbery (11th season)
- Captain: Stan Smith
- Home stadium: Rogers Field

1936 Pacific Coast Conference football standings
| | Conf. | | | | | Overall |
| Team | W | | L | | T | W | | L | | T |
|---|---|---|---|---|---|---|---|---|---|---|
| No. 5 Washington $ | 7 | – | 0 | – | 1 | 7 | – | 2 | – | 1 |
| Washington State | 6 | – | 2 | – | 1 | 6 | – | 3 | – | 1 |
| USC | 3 | – | 2 | – | 2 | 4 | – | 2 | – | 3 |
| California | 4 | – | 3 | – | 0 | 6 | – | 5 | – | 0 |
| UCLA | 4 | – | 3 | – | 1 | 6 | – | 3 | – | 1 |
| Stanford | 2 | – | 3 | – | 2 | 2 | – | 5 | – | 2 |
| Oregon State | 3 | – | 5 | – | 0 | 4 | – | 6 | – | 0 |
| Montana | 1 | – | 3 | – | 0 | 6 | – | 3 | – | 0 |
| Oregon | 1 | – | 6 | – | 1 | 2 | – | 6 | – | 1 |
| Idaho | 0 | – | 4 | – | 0 | 3 | – | 7 | – | 0 |
$ – Conference champion; Rankings from AP Poll

The 1936 Washington State Cougars football team was an American football team that represented Washington State College during the 1936 college football season. Head coach Babe Hollingbery led the team to a 6–2–1 mark in the PCC and 6–3–1 overall.

== Schedule ==
| Date | Opponent | Rank | Site | Result | Attendance | Source |
|---|---|---|---|---|---|---|
| September 26 | Montana | | Rogers Field; Pullman, WA | W 19–0 | 6,500 | |
| October 3 | Stanford | | Rogers Field; Pullman, WA | W 14–13 | 21,000 | |
| October 10 | at Idaho | | MacLean Field; Moscow, ID (rivalry) | W 14–0 | 12,500 | |
| October 17 | at USC | | Los Angeles Memorial Coliseum; Los Angeles, CA | T 0–0 | 25,000 | |
| October 24 | at Oregon | | Hayward Field; Eugene, OR | W 3–0 | 12,000 | |
| October 31 | at California | | California Memorial Stadium; Berkeley, CA | W 14–13 | 35,000 | |
| November 7 | Oregon State | No. 17 | Rogers Field; Pullman, WA | L 6–16 | 13,000 | |
| November 14 | at UCLA | No. 14 | Los Angeles Memorial Coliseum; Los Angeles, CA | W 32–7 | 35,000 | |
| November 26 | at No. 6 Washington | No. 20 | Husky Stadium; Seattle, WA (rivalry) | L 0–40 | 41,000 | |
| December 5 | at Gonzaga* | | Gonzaga Stadium; Spokane, WA | L 6–13 | 6,000 | |
*Non-conference game; Rankings from AP Poll released prior to the game; Source:
