= Doug Dashiell =

American football player and coach (1905–1975)

Biographical details
- Born: July 14, 1905
- Died: April 21, 1975 (aged 69); Irvine, California, U.S.

Playing career
- 1920s: Southwestern (TX)
- Position: Halfback

Coaching career (HC unless noted)
- 1936–1938: Nevada
- 1939–1940: Stockton

Head coaching record
- Overall: 8–13–1 (college)

Douglas Dashiell (July 14, 1905 – April 21, 1975) was an American college football coach and United States Army Air Forces and Air Force officer. He served as the head coach at the University of Nevada, Reno from 1936 to 1938. He amassed an 8–13–1 record during his tenure.

== Early life and playing career ==
Dashiell was born on July 14, 1905, and attended Las Vegas High School. He attended college at Southwestern University in Georgetown, Texas, where he played on the football team.

== Coaching career ==
In December 1935, the University of Nevada, Reno hired Dashiell as the head coach of its football team. He held that post from 1936 through 1938 and amassed an 8–13–1 record.

Through his first two seasons, Nevada recorded a 6–10 mark. During the 1938 season, the Wolf Pack amassed a 2–2–1 record with one game remaining against the College of the Pacific. Dashiell resigned on the eve of that game, October 27, 1938, bowing to pressure from an "open rebellion" amongst the student body. Forty football players, the team manager, and student president had signed a petition for the ouster of Dashiell, line coach Duane Keller, and athletic director J. E. Martie. The group stated:

"Our complaint against Martie is that he has refused to provide us with the proper equipment, that he is disrupting the whole athletic setup and that no football coach can hope to succeed so long as Martie is director of athletics ... So far as Doug Dashiell and Duane Keller are concerned, we have nothing against them personally. We believe them to be fine men, but we do not believe they know how to coach football. Their stuff will not work for a college team."

The basketball team, however, requested the retention of Martie as its coach. The final game against Pacific was "coachless", but led through pre-game practices by veteran tackle Harry Bradley and injured tackle Ray Garamendi. Nevada lost, 51–0. Dashiell remained on the physical education department faculty through the remainder of the school year. In April, Dashiell stated he would not apply "for any position in the newly established Department of Athletics at the University of Nevada."

In 1939, Dashiell took over as the head football coach at Stockton Junior College—now known as San Joaquin Delta College—in Stockton, California. He left Stockton in the spring of 1941 when he was hired by the United States Army Air Corps as director of physical training for the West Coast Training Center at Moffett Field in Santa Clara County, California.

== After football ==
During the Second World War, he served as an officer in the United States Army Air Forces. On January 1, 1943, he was promoted to the rank of captain while serving as the physical training director for the USAAF West Coast Training Center. After the war, he remained in the reserves, and as of 1955 was the commander of the 9342nd Air Reserve Squadron at the rank of lieutenant colonel. He worked on the staff of the Veterans Administration Center at Sawtelle, California, from 1946 through 1959.

On October 25, 1968, Dashiell suffered a fractured left knee when his wife lost control of a motorized golf cart and crashed into a parked truck on the Keauhou-Kona Golf Course in Kona, Hawaii. Dashiell died on April 21, 1975, in Irvine, California, at the age of 69.

== Head coaching record ==
=== College ===
Year	Team	Overall	Conference	Standing	Bowl/playoffs
Nevada Wolf Pack (Far Western Conference) (1936–1938)
1936	Nevada	4–4	2–2	3rd	
1937	Nevada	2–6	1–3	4th	
1938	Nevada	2–3–1	1–2	3rd	
Nevada:		8–13–1	4–7		
Total:		8–13–1			
