= 1936 Idaho Vandals football team =

American college football season

1936 Idaho Vandals football
- Conference: Pacific Coast Conference
- Record: 3–7 (0–4 PCC)
- Head coach: Ted Bank (2nd season)
- Captains: John Cooper; Leon Green
- Home stadium: MacLean Field

1936 Pacific Coast Conference football standings
	Conf.					Overall
Team	W		L		T	W		L		T
No. 5 Washington $	7	–	0	–	1	7	–	2	–	1
Washington State	6	–	2	–	1	6	–	3	–	1
USC	3	–	2	–	2	4	–	2	–	3
California	4	–	3	–	0	6	–	5	–	0
UCLA	4	–	3	–	1	6	–	3	–	1
Stanford	2	–	3	–	2	2	–	5	–	2
Oregon State	3	–	5	–	0	4	–	6	–	0
Montana	1	–	3	–	0	6	–	3	–	0
Oregon	1	–	6	–	1	2	–	6	–	1
Idaho	0	–	4	–	0	3	–	7	–	0
$ – Conference champion; Rankings from AP Poll

The 1936 Idaho Vandals football team represented the University of Idaho in the 1936 college football season. The Vandals were led by second-year head coach Ted Bank, and were members of the Pacific Coast Conference. Home games were played on campus in Moscow at MacLean Field, with none in Boise.

Idaho compiled a 3–7 overall record and lost all four games in the PCC.

In the Battle of the Palouse with neighbor Washington State, the Vandals suffered a ninth straight loss, falling 0–14 at homecoming in Moscow on October 10. Idaho's most recent win in the series was eleven years earlier in 1925 and the next was eighteen years away in 1954.

Future coaches among the Vandal players included sophomores Tony Knap, Lyle Smith, and Steve Belko. Future athletic director Leon Green, grandfather of UI president Scott Green, played right end and was a team captain.

This was the final season for varsity football at MacLean Field and its final game on November 21 was a Vandal win; grading began on the new stadium site to the west in late summer 1936, and it opened the following season as Neale Stadium.

== Schedule ==
Date	Opponent	Site	Result	Attendance	Source
September 26	Whitman*	MacLean Field; Moscow, ID	W 25–6	5,000	
October 3	at Washington	Husky Stadium; Seattle, WA	L 0–22	10,481	
October 10	Washington State^{†}	MacLean Field; Moscow, ID (Battle of the Palouse)	L 0–14	12,500	
October 17	at Oregon	Multnomah Stadium; Portland, OR	L 0–13	8,000	
October 24	at Nevada*	old Mackay Stadium; Reno, NV	L 6–7	6,000	
October 31	at Gonzaga*	Gonzaga Stadium; Spokane, WA (rivalry)	W 18–7	8,500	
November 7	vs. Saint Mary's*	Kezar Stadium; San Francisco, CA	L 7–26		
November 14	at Montana	Dornblaser Field; Missoula, MT (rivalry)	L 0–16	6,000	
November 21	North Dakota Agricultural*	MacLean Field; Moscow, ID	W 13–12	3,200	
November 26	vs. Utah State*	Ogden Stadium; Ogden, UT	L 0–10	11,000	
*Non-conference game; ^{†}Homecoming; Source:

== All-conference ==
No Vandals were named to the All-Coast team; honorable mention were tackle Stonko Pavkov, guard John Cooper, halfback Clarence Devlin, and fullback Ross Sundberg.
