= 1936 Oregon Webfoots football team =

American college football season

1936 Oregon Webfoots football
- Conference: Pacific Coast Conference
- Record: 2–6–1 (1–6–1 PCC)
- Head coach: Prink Callison (5th season)
- Captain: Del Bjork
- Home stadium: Hayward Field

1936 Pacific Coast Conference football standings
	Conf.					Overall
Team	W		L		T	W		L		T
No. 5 Washington $	7	–	0	–	1	7	–	2	–	1
Washington State	6	–	2	–	1	6	–	3	–	1
USC	3	–	2	–	2	4	–	2	–	3
California	4	–	3	–	0	6	–	5	–	0
UCLA	4	–	3	–	1	6	–	3	–	1
Stanford	2	–	3	–	2	2	–	5	–	2
Oregon State	3	–	5	–	0	4	–	6	–	0
Montana	1	–	3	–	0	6	–	3	–	0
Oregon	1	–	6	–	1	2	–	6	–	1
Idaho	0	–	4	–	0	3	–	7	–	0
$ – Conference champion; Rankings from AP Poll

The 1936 Oregon Webfoots football team represented the University of Oregon in the Pacific Coast Conference (PCC) during the 1936 college football season. In their fifth season under head coach Prink Callison, the Webfoots compiled a 2–6–1 record (1–6–1 against PCC opponents), finished in ninth place in the PCC, and were outscored by their opponents, 96 to 34. The team played its home games at Hayward Field in Eugene, Oregon.

== Schedule ==
Date	Opponent	Site	Result	Attendance	Source
September 25	Portland*	Hayward Field; Eugene, OR	W 14–0		
October 3	at USC	Los Angeles Memorial Coliseum; Los Angeles, CA	L 0–26	35,000	
October 10	at Stanford	Stanford Stadium; Stanford, CA	T 7–7	18,000	
October 17	Idaho	Multnomah Stadium; Portland, OR	W 13–0	8,000	
October 24	Washington State	Hayward Field; Eugene, OR	L 0–3	12,000	
October 31	No. 4 Washington	Multnomah Stadium; Portland, OR (rivalry)	L 0–7	17,681	
November 7	UCLA	Multnomah Stadium; Portland, OR	L 0–7	10,000	
November 14	at California	California Memorial Stadium; Berkeley, CA	L 0–28		
November 21	at Oregon State	Bell Field; Corvallis, OR (rivalry)	L 0–18	18,000	
*Non-conference game; Rankings from AP Poll released prior to the game; Source:
