= 1936 Oregon State Beavers football team =

American college football season

1936 Oregon State Beavers football
- Conference: Pacific Coast Conference
- Record: 4–6 (3–5 PCC)
- Head coach: Lon Stiner (4th season)
- Home stadium: Bell Field

1936 Pacific Coast Conference football standings
	Conf.					Overall
Team	W		L		T	W		L		T
No. 5 Washington $	7	–	0	–	1	7	–	2	–	1
Washington State	6	–	2	–	1	6	–	3	–	1
USC	3	–	2	–	2	4	–	2	–	3
California	4	–	3	–	0	6	–	5	–	0
UCLA	4	–	3	–	1	6	–	3	–	1
Stanford	2	–	3	–	2	2	–	5	–	2
Oregon State	3	–	5	–	0	4	–	6	–	0
Montana	1	–	3	–	0	6	–	3	–	0
Oregon	1	–	6	–	1	2	–	6	–	1
Idaho	0	–	4	–	0	3	–	7	–	0
$ – Conference champion; Rankings from AP Poll

The 1936 Oregon State Beavers football team represented Oregon State College in the Pacific Coast Conference (PCC) during the 1936 college football season. In their fourth season under head coach Lon Stiner, the Beavers compiled a 4–6 record (3–5 against PCC opponents), finished in seventh place in the PCC, and outscored their opponents, 151 to 116.

The Beavers tallied 1,254 yards from scrimmage and held opponents to 862 yards from scrimmage. Joe Gray, dubbed the "Gray Ghost", was described as "the chief cog in Oregon State's backfield and "one of the outstanding performers in recent Orange history."

For the 1936 season, Hal Moe replaced Laurie Walquist as the team's backfield coach. Howard Maple took over as the freshmen coach.

The team played its home games at Bell Field in Corvallis, Oregon and Multnomah Stadium in Portland.

The 1936 OSC squad finished the season ranked #69 nationally.

== Schedule ==
Date	Opponent	Site	Result	Attendance	Source
September 26	at USC	Los Angeles Memorial Coliseum; Los Angeles, CA	L 7–38	45,000	
October 3	Willamette*	Bell Field; Corvallis, OR	W 13–0		
October 10	California	Multnomah Stadium; Portland, OR	L 0–7	15,000	
October 17	at Washington	Husky Stadium; Seattle, WA	L 7–19	12,000	
October 24	at UCLA	Los Angeles Memorial Coliseum; Los Angeles, CA	L 13–22	26,563	
October 31	Montana	Bell Field; Corvallis, OR	W 11–7	4,000	
November 7	at No. 17 Washington State	Rogers Field; Pullman, WA	W 16–6	13,000	
November 14	Stanford	Multnomah Stadium; Portland, OR	L 14–20	14,000	
November 21	Oregon	Bell Field; Corvallis, OR (rivalry)	W 18–0	18,000	
November 28	No. 10 Nebraska*	Multnomah Stadium; Portland, OR	L 14–32	12,000	
*Non-conference game; Rankings from AP Poll released prior to the game

== Roster ==
- HB Joe Gray, Jr.
