= 1936 New Mexico A&M Aggies football team =

American college football season

1936 New Mexico A&M Aggies football
- Conference: Border Conference
- Record: 6–4–1 (3–2 Border)
- Head coach: Jerry Hines (8th season)
- Home stadium: Quesenberry Field

1936 Border Conference football standings
	Conf.					Overall
Team	W		L		T	W		L		T
Arizona $	3	–	0	–	0	5	–	2	–	3
Texas Mines	2	–	1	–	1	5	–	3	–	1
New Mexico A&M	3	–	2	–	0	6	–	4	–	1
Arizona State	2	–	3	–	0	4	–	5	–	0
Arizona State–Flagstaff	1	–	2	–	1	3	–	4	–	1
New Mexico	1	–	4	–	0	2	–	7	–	0
Texas Tech	0	–	0	–	0	5	–	4	–	1
$ – Conference champion; Arizona State and Arizona State–Flagstaff played twice, but only the first meeting counted in the conference standings. The game between Arizona and Texas Tech also did not count in the conference standings.

The 1936 New Mexico A&M Aggies football team was an American football team that represented New Mexico College of Agriculture and Mechanical Arts (now known as New Mexico State University) as a member of the Border Conference during the 1936 college football season. In its eighth year under head coach Jerry Hines, the team compiled a 6–4–1 record (3–2 against conference opponents), finished third in the conference, and outscored opponents by a total of 261 to 118.

== Schedule ==
Date	Opponent	Site	Result	Attendance	Source
September 25	Panhandle A&M*	Quesenberry Field; Las Cruces, NM	W 58–6		
October 2	Adams State*	Quesenberry Field; Las Cruces, NM	W 67–0		
October 9	Arizona State–Flagstaff	Quesenberry Field; Las Cruces, NM	W 41–0		
October 17	at New Mexico Military*	Roswell, NM	L 6–13		
October 24	at Arizona	Arizona Stadium; Tucson, AZ	L 7–28		
October 31	San Diego State*^{†}	Quesenberry Field; Las Cruces, NM	T 7–7	4,000	
November 7	at Arizona State	Goodwin Stadium; Tempe, AZ	W 20–6		
November 14	at New Mexico	University Field; Albuquerque, NM (rivalry)	W 7–6	5,000	
November 20	Silver City Teachers*	Quesenberry Field; Las Cruces, NM	W 27–0		
November 26	at Texas Mines	Kidd Field; El Paso, TX (rivalry)	L 7–27	5,500	
December 25	at Santa Barbara State*	Peabody Stadium; Santa Barbara, CA	L 14–25	6,000	
*Non-conference game; ^{†}Homecoming
