= 1936 Pacific Tigers football team =

Football team

1936 Pacific Tigers football

FWC champion
- Conference: Far Western Conference
- Record: 5–4–1 (4–0 FWC)
- Head coach: Amos Alonzo Stagg (4th season)
- Home stadium: Baxter Stadium

1936 Far Western Conference football standings
	Conf.					Overall
Team	W		L		T	W		L		T
Pacific (CA) $	4	–	0	–	0	5	–	4	–	1
Fresno State	2	–	1	–	0	5	–	3	–	1
Nevada	2	–	2	–	0	4	–	4	–	0
Cal Aggies	1	–	2	–	0	3	–	4	–	0
Chico State	0	–	4	–	0	1	–	6	–	1
$ – Conference champion

The 1936 Pacific Tigers football team represented the College of the Pacific—now known as the University of the Pacific—in Stockton, California as a member of the Far Western Conference (FWC) during the 1936 college football season. Led by fourth-year head coach Amos Alonzo Stagg, Pacific compiled an overall record of 5–4–1 with a mark of 4–0 in conference play, winning the FWC title. The team outscored its opponents 107 to 63 for the season. The Tigers played home games at Baxter Stadium in Stockton.

== Schedule ==
Date	Opponent	Site	Result	Attendance	Source
September 26	at California*	California Memorial Stadium; Berkeley, CA	L 0–14		
October 2	California JV*	Baxter Stadium; Stockton, CA	W 26–0		
October 10	at San Jose State*	Spartan Stadium; San Jose, CA (rivalry)	L 0–8		
October 17	at Chico State	College Field; Chico, CA	W 20–0		
October 23	at Loyola (CA)*	Gilmore Stadium; Los Angeles, CA	L 6–7	> 16,000	
October 31	Cal Aggies^{†}	Baxter Stadium; Stockton, CA	W 13–0		
November 6	Nevada	Baxter Stadium; Stockton, CA	W 25–0		
November 13	Fresno State	Baxter Stadium; Stockton, CA	W 17–0	7,000	
November 26	Saint Mary's*	Kezar Stadium; San Francisco, CA	L 0–34	12,000	
December 5	at San Diego Marines (Note: The Marine Corps Recruit Depot (MCRD) in San Diego fielded a team that played against colleges and other military teams from 1922 to 1964.)*	Balboa Stadium?; San Diego, CA	T 0–0		
*Non-conference game; ^{†}Homecoming
