= 1936 Montana Grizzlies football team =

American college football season

1936 Montana Grizzlies football
- Conference: Pacific Coast Conference
- Record: 6–3 (1–3 PCC)
- Head coach: Doug Fessenden (2nd season)
- Home stadium: Dornblaser Field

1936 Pacific Coast Conference football standings
	Conf.					Overall
Team	W		L		T	W		L		T
No. 5 Washington $	7	–	0	–	1	7	–	2	–	1
Washington State	6	–	2	–	1	6	–	3	–	1
USC	3	–	2	–	2	4	–	2	–	3
California	4	–	3	–	0	6	–	5	–	0
UCLA	4	–	3	–	1	6	–	3	–	1
Stanford	2	–	3	–	2	2	–	5	–	2
Oregon State	3	–	5	–	0	4	–	6	–	0
Montana	1	–	3	–	0	6	–	3	–	0
Oregon	1	–	6	–	1	2	–	6	–	1
Idaho	0	–	4	–	0	3	–	7	–	0
$ – Conference champion; Rankings from AP Poll

The 1936 Montana Grizzlies football team represented the University of Montana in the 1936 college football season as a member of the Pacific Coast Conference (PCC). The Grizzlies were led by second-year head coach Doug Fessenden, played their home games at Dornblaser Field and finished the season with a record of six wins and three losses (6–3, 1–3 PCC).

== Schedule ==
Date	Opponent	Site	Result	Attendance	Source
September 26	at Washington State	Rogers Field; Pullman, WA	L 0–19	6,500	
October 2	at UCLA	Los Angeles Memorial Coliseum; Los Angeles, CA	L 0–30	25,000	
October 10	Idaho Southern Branch*	Dornblaser Field; Missoula, MT	W 45–13		
October 17	Gonzaga*	Dornblaser Field; Missoula, MT	W 6–0	6,000	
October 24	vs. Montana State*	Clark Park; Butte, MT (rivalry)	W 27–0		
October 31	at Oregon State	Bell Field; Corvallis, OR	L 7–14		
November 14	Idaho	Dornblaser Field; Missoula, MT (rivalry)	W 16–0	6,000	
November 21	San Francisco*	Clark Park; Butte, MT	W 24–7		
November 26	North Dakota*	Dornblaser Field; Missoula, MT	W 13–6	5,000	
*Non-conference game; Source:
