= 1936 Humboldt State Lumberjacks football team =

American college football season

1936 Humboldt State Lumberjacks football
- Conference: Independent
- Record: 6–3
- Head coach: Charles F. Erb (2nd season)
- Home stadium: Albee Stadium

1936 Western college football independents records
	Conf.			Overall
Team	W	L	T	W		L		T
No. 6 Santa Clara		–		8	–	1	–	0
Humboldt State		–		6	–	3	–	0
Loyola (CA)		–		6	–	3	–	0
Saint Mary's		–		6	–	3	–	1
Gonzaga		–		5	–	3	–	0
Pomona		–		6	–	4	–	0
Cal Poly		–		5	–	4	–	0
San Jose State		–		5	–	4	–	0
Idaho Southern Branch		–		4	–	4	–	0
San Francisco		–		4	–	4	–	2
Portland		–		3	–	4	–	0
San Francisco State		–		2	–	3	–	1
Hawaii		–		3	–	5	–	0
Rankings from AP Poll

The 1936 Humboldt State Lumberjacks football team represented Humboldt State College—now known as California State Polytechnic University, Humboldt—as an independent during the 1936 college football season. Led by second-year head coach Charles F. Erb, the Lumberjacks compiled a record of 6–3 and outscored their opponents 139 to 66 for the season. The team played home games at Albee Stadium in Eureka, California.

== Schedule ==
Date	Opponent	Site	Result	Attendance	Source
September 20	San Francisco freshmen	Albee Stadium; Eureka, CA	W 7–6		
October 2	at Cal Aggies	A Street Field; Davis, CA	L 0–18		
October 11	Santa Clara freshmen	Albee Stadium; Eureka, CA	L 0–7		
October 17	Cardinal Athletic Club (Oakland, CA)	Albee Stadium; Eureka, CA	W 24–0		
October 25	Saint Mary's freshmen	Albee Stadium; Eureka, CA	L 7–20		
October 30	Southern Oregon Normal	Albee Stadium; Eureka, CA	W 40–3		
November 7	San Jose State	Albee Stadium; Eureka, CA	W 20–0	2,000	
November 15	Salinas	Albee Stadium; Eureka, CA	W 27–6		
November 26	at Chico State	Chico High School Stadium; Chico, CA	W 14–6		
