= 1936 San Diego State Aztecs football team =

American college football season

1936 San Diego State Aztecs football

SCC champion
- Conference: Southern California Conference
- Record: 6–1–1 (5–0 SCC)
- Head coach: Leo Calland (2nd season)
- Home stadium: Aztec Bowl

1936 Southern California Conference football standings
	Conf.					Overall
Team	W		L		T	W		L		T
San Diego State $	5	–	0	–	0	6	–	1	–	1
Santa Barbara State	4	–	1	–	0	9	–	1	–	0
Whittier	3	–	2	–	0	5	–	5	–	0
Redlands	2	–	3	–	0	2	–	6	–	0
Occidental	1	–	4	–	0	3	–	5	–	1
La Verne	0	–	5	–	0	1	–	7	–	0
$ – Conference champion

The 1936 San Diego State Aztecs football team represented San Diego State College (Note: San Diego State University was known as San Diego State College from 1935 to 1971.) during the 1936 college football season.

San Diego State competed in the Southern California Intercollegiate Athletic Conference (SCIAC). The 1936 San Diego State team was led by head coach Leo B. Calland in his second season with the Aztecs. They played home games at the new Aztec Bowl in San Diego, California. Aztec Bowl was constructed as one of nine different Works Progress Administration (WPA) projects on the San Diego State campus. The Aztecs finished the season as champion of the SCIAC, with six wins, one loss and one tie (6–1–1, 5–0 SCIAC). Overall, the team scored 118 points for the season while giving up 62.

== Schedule ==
Date	Opponent	Site	Result	Attendance	Source
October 3	Occidental	Aztec Bowl; San Diego, CA	W 7–0	7,500	
October 10	La Verne	Aztec Bowl; San Diego, CA	W 35–6	4,500	
October 17	at Redlands	Redlands Stadium (Note: This stadium is the predecessor to the current Ted Runner Stadium on the University of Redlands campus, which was opened for the 1968 season); Redlands, CA	W 27–7		
October 24	San Jose State*	Aztec Bowl; San Diego, CA	W 14–6	10,000	
October 31	at New Mexico A&M*	Quesenberry Field; Las Cruces, NM	T 7–7	4,000	
November 11	San Diego Marines (Note: The Marine Corps Recruit Depot (MCRD) in San Diego fielded a team that played against colleges and other military teams from 1922 to 1964.)*	Balboa Stadium; San Diego, CA	L 0–14	10,000	
November 21	Santa Barbara State	Aztec Bowl; San Diego, CA	W 9–8	8,000	
November 28	at Whittier	Hadley Field; Whittier, CA	W 19–14	7,000	
*Non-conference game
