= 1936 New Mexico Lobos football team =

American college football season

1936 New Mexico Lobos football
- Conference: Border Conference
- Record: 2–7 (1–4 Border)
- Head coach: Gwinn Henry (3rd season)
- Home stadium: University Field

1936 Border Conference football standings
	Conf.					Overall
Team	W		L		T	W		L		T
Arizona $	3	–	0	–	0	5	–	2	–	3
Texas Mines	2	–	1	–	1	5	–	3	–	1
New Mexico A&M	3	–	2	–	0	6	–	4	–	1
Arizona State	2	–	3	–	0	4	–	5	–	0
Arizona State–Flagstaff	1	–	2	–	1	3	–	4	–	1
New Mexico	1	–	4	–	0	2	–	7	–	0
Texas Tech	0	–	0	–	0	5	–	4	–	1
$ – Conference champion; Arizona State and Arizona State–Flagstaff played twice, but only the first meeting counted in the conference standings. The game between Arizona and Texas Tech also did not count in the conference standings.

The 1936 New Mexico Lobos football team represented the University of New Mexico as a member of the Border Conference during the 1936 college football season. In their third and final season under head coach Gwinn Henry, the Lobos compiled an overall record of 2–7 record with a mark of 1–4 against conference opponents, finished last out of seven teams in the Border Conference, and were outscored by opponents by a total of 95 to 71.

== Schedule ==
Date	Opponent	Site	Result	Attendance	Source
September 26	Silver City Teachers*	University Stadium; Albuquerque, NM	L 0–6		
October 3	at Colorado A&M*	Colorado Field; Fort Collins, CO	L 7–9		
October 10	West Texas State*	University Stadium; Albuquerque, NM	L 7–13		
October 17	at Texas Mines	Kidd Field; El Paso, TX	L 7–12		
October 24	New Mexico Military*	University Stadium; Albuquerque, NM	W 13–7		
October 31	at Arizona State	Goodwin Stadium; Tempe, AZ	L 6–7		
November 7	at Arizona	Arizona Stadium; Tucson, AZ (rivalry)	L 0–28		
November 14	New Mexico A&M^{†}	University Stadium; Albuquerque, NM (rivalry)	L 6–7	5,000	
November 26	Arizona State–Flagstaff	University Stadium; Albuquerque, NM	W 25–6	5,000	
*Non-conference game; ^{†}Homecoming
