= 1936 San Francisco State Staters football team =

American college football season

1936 San Francisco State Staters football
- Conference: Independent
- Record: 2–3–1
- Head coach: Dan Farmer & Hal Hardin (2nd season)
- Home stadium: Roberts Field

1936 Western college football independents records
	Conf.			Overall
Team	W	L	T	W		L		T
No. 6 Santa Clara		–		8	–	1	–	0
Humboldt State		–		6	–	3	–	0
Loyola (CA)		–		6	–	3	–	0
Saint Mary's		–		6	–	3	–	1
Gonzaga		–		5	–	3	–	0
Pomona		–		6	–	4	–	0
Cal Poly		–		5	–	4	–	0
San Jose State		–		5	–	4	–	0
Idaho Southern Branch		–		4	–	4	–	0
San Francisco		–		4	–	4	–	2
Portland		–		3	–	4	–	0
San Francisco State		–		2	–	3	–	1
Hawaii		–		3	–	5	–	0
Rankings from AP Poll

The 1936 San Francisco State States football team represented San Francisco State College—now known as San Francisco State University—as an independent during the 1936 college football season. Led by second-year co-head coaches Dan Farmer and Hal Hardin, San Francisco State compiled a record of 2–3–1 and was outscored by its opponents 106 to 41. The team played home games at a new stadium in 1936, Roberts Field in San Francisco, which was actually the old ballpark Recreation Park, converted for football. Although the "Gator" was voted to be the mascot for the team in 1931, local newspaper articles called the team the "Staters" from 1935 through 1940.

== Schedule ==
Date	Opponent	Site	Result	Attendance	Source
September 25	Mare Island Marines	Roberts Field; San Francisco, CA	W 26–0	5,000	
October 2	Marin	Roberts Field; San Francisco, CA	L 0–32	5,000	
October 9	San Francisco Junior College	Roberts Field; San Francisco, CA	W 2–0	7,500	
October 16	Miramonte Junior College (Note: Miramonte School and Junior College was a private school in Atascadero, California, founded in 1933 and folded sometime in the late 1930s.)	Roberts Field; San Francisco, CA	L 0–31		
October 23	at Chico State	Oroville High School; Oroville, CA	T 6–6	2,000	
October 30	at San Francisco Boys Club	San Francisco, CA	Cancelled (rain)		
November 7	at Santa Barbara State	Peabody Stadium; Santa Barbara, CA	L 7–37		
