= 1936 Washington Huskies football team =

American college football season

1936 Washington Huskies football

PCC champion

Rose Bowl, L 0–21 vs. Pittsburgh
- Conference: Pacific Coast Conference

Ranking
- AP: No. 5
- Record: 7–2–1 (7–0–1 PCC)
- Head coach: Jimmy Phelan (7th season)
- Captain: Chuck Bond
- Home stadium: University of Washington Stadium

1936 Pacific Coast Conference football standings
	Conf.					Overall
Team	W		L		T	W		L		T
No. 5 Washington $	7	–	0	–	1	7	–	2	–	1
Washington State	6	–	2	–	1	6	–	3	–	1
USC	3	–	2	–	2	4	–	2	–	3
California	4	–	3	–	0	6	–	5	–	0
UCLA	4	–	3	–	1	6	–	3	–	1
Stanford	2	–	3	–	2	2	–	5	–	2
Oregon State	3	–	5	–	0	4	–	6	–	0
Montana	1	–	3	–	0	6	–	3	–	0
Oregon	1	–	6	–	1	2	–	6	–	1
Idaho	0	–	4	–	0	3	–	7	–	0
$ – Conference champion; Rankings from AP Poll

The 1936 Washington Huskies football team was an American football team that represented the University of Washington during the 1936 college football season. In its seventh season under head coach Jimmy Phelan, the team compiled a 7–2–1 record, finished in first place in the Pacific Coast Conference, was ranked No. 5 in the final AP Poll, lost to Pittsburgh in the 1937 Rose Bowl, and outscored all opponents by a combined total of 148 to 56. Chuck Bond was the team captain.

== Schedule ==
Date	Opponent	Rank	Site	Result	Attendance	Source
September 26	Minnesota*		University of Washington Stadium; Seattle, WA	L 7–14	37,000	
October 3	Idaho		University of Washington Stadium; Seattle, WA	W 22–0	10,481	
October 10	at UCLA		Los Angeles Memorial Coliseum; Los Angeles, CA	W 14–0	50,000	
October 17	Oregon State		University of Washington Stadium; Seattle, WA	W 19–7	12,000	
October 24	California	No. 8	University of Washington Stadium; Seattle, WA	W 13–0	18,315	
October 31	at Oregon	No. 4	Multnomah Stadium; Portland, OR (rivalry)	W 7–0	17,681	
November 7	at Stanford	No. 6	Stanford Stadium; Stanford, CA	T 14–14	42,500	
November 14	No. 15 USC^{†}	No. 10	University of Washington Stadium; Seattle, WA	W 12–0	32,000	
November 26	No. 20 Washington State	No. 6	University of Washington Stadium; Seattle, WA (rivalry)	W 40–0	41,000	
January 1, 1937	vs. Pittsburgh*	No. 5	Rose Bowl; Pasadena, CA (Rose Bowl)	L 0–21	87,196	
*Non-conference game; ^{†}Homecoming; Rankings from AP Poll released prior to the game; Source:

== NFL draft selections ==
Six University of Washington Huskies were selected in the 1937 NFL draft, which lasted ten rounds with 100 selections.

= Husky Hall of Fame

Player	Position	Round	Pick	NFL club
Max Starcevich	Guard	3	22	Brooklyn Dodgers
John Wiatrak	Center	4	40	Cleveland Rams
Chuck Bond	Tackle	5	46	Boston Redskins
Jim Cain	Back	6	56	Boston Redskins
Byron Haines	End	7	65	Pittsburgh Pirates
Ed Nowogroski	Back	9	82	Brooklyn Dodgers
