= 1936 Idaho Southern Branch Bengals football team =

American college football season

1936 Idaho Southern Branch Bengals football
- Conference: Independent
- Record: 4–4
- Head coach: Guy Wicks (2nd season)
- Captain: Les Hopkins
- Home stadium: Hutchinson Field; Spud Bowl

1936 Western college football independents records
	Conf.			Overall
Team	W	L	T	W		L		T
No. 6 Santa Clara		–		8	–	1	–	0
Humboldt State		–		6	–	3	–	0
Loyola (CA)		–		6	–	3	–	0
Saint Mary's		–		6	–	3	–	1
Gonzaga		–		5	–	3	–	0
Pomona		–		6	–	4	–	0
Cal Poly		–		5	–	4	–	0
San Jose State		–		5	–	4	–	0
Idaho Southern Branch		–		4	–	4	–	0
San Francisco		–		4	–	4	–	2
Portland		–		3	–	4	–	0
San Francisco State		–		2	–	3	–	1
Hawaii		–		3	–	5	–	0
Rankings from AP Poll

The 1936 Idaho Southern Branch Bengals football team was an American football team that represented the University of Idaho, Southern Branch (later renamed Idaho State University) as an independent during the 1936 college football season. In their second season under head coach Guy Wicks, the team compiled a 4–4 record and outscored opponents by a total of 138 to 111.

Future Idaho State head football coach Babe Caccia played on the team. Various members of the team returned to campus for a 25th year reunion in October 1961.

== Schedule ==
Date	Opponent	Site	Result	Attendance	Source
October 2	at Nevada	Mackay Stadium; Reno, NV	L 12–21	~5,000	
October 10 (Note: Idaho State's media guide lists an October 9 date for this game.)	at Montana	Dornblaser Field; Missoula, MT	L 13–45		
October 17	Western State (CO)	Hutchinson Field; Pocatello, ID	W 12–0		
October 23 (Note: Idaho State's media guide lists an October 25 date for this game.)	at Ricks	Rexburg, ID	W 34–0		
October 31 (Note: The October 31 game was played during a snowstorm.)	at Montana Mines	Butte, MT	L 0–6		
November 6	Albion Normal (Note: Albion Normal is listed in some sources as Southern Idaho, a name adopted in 1947.)	Hutchinson Field; Pocatello, ID	W 18–7		
November 11 (Note: November 11 was the first game contested at Idaho State's "Spud Bowl", now Davis Field.)	Montana State	Spud Bowl; Pocatello, ID	L 19–32		
November 21	College of Idaho^{†}	Spud Bowl; Pocatello, ID	W 30–0		
^{†}Homecoming
