= 1936 South Dakota State Jackrabbits football team =

American college football season

1936 South Dakota State Jackrabbits football
- Conference: North Central Conference
- Record: 3–6–1 (1–4–1 NCC)
- Head coach: Red Threlfall (3rd season)
- Home stadium: State Field

1936 North Central Conference football standings
	Conf.					Overall
Team	W		L		T	W		L		T
North Dakota $	4	–	0	–	0	9	–	2	–	0
South Dakota	3	–	1	–	0	4	–	3	–	2
North Dakota Agricultural	2	–	2	–	0	4	–	5	–	0
Morningside	2	–	3	–	0	3	–	4	–	0
Omaha	1	–	2	–	2	2	–	3	–	2
Iowa State Teachers	1	–	2	–	1	5	–	2	–	2
South Dakota State	1	–	4	–	1	3	–	6	–	1
$ – Conference champion

The 1936 South Dakota State Jackrabbits football team was an American football team that represented South Dakota State University in the North Central Conference (NCC) during the 1936 college football season. In its third season under head coach Red Threlfall, the team compiled a 3–6–1 record and was outscored by a total of 116 to 51.

== Schedule ==
Date	Opponent	Site	Result	Attendance	Source
September 19	Gustavus Adolphus*	State Field; Brookings, SD	W 12–7		
September 26	at Wisconsin*	Camp Randall Stadium; Madison, WI	L 7–24		
October 3	at Morningside	Stock Yards Park; Sioux City, IA	L 0–13		
October 10	Luther*	State Field; Brookings, SD	W 13–6		
October 17	at Omaha	Omaha, NE	T 0–0		
October 23	at North Dakota	Memorial Stadium; Grand Forks, ND	L 6–33		
October 31	South Dakota^{†}	State Field; Brookings, SD (Hobo Day, rivalry)	L 0–6		
November 7	Iowa State Teachers	State Field; Brookings, SD	W 13–0		
November 14	vs. North Dakota Agricultural	East Side Field; Sioux Falls, SD (rivalry, Atokad Day)	L 0–7		
November 26	Wichita*	Wichita, KS	L 0–20	5,000	
*Non-conference game; ^{†}Homecoming
