= 1936 Stanford Indians football team =

American college football season

1936 Stanford Indians football
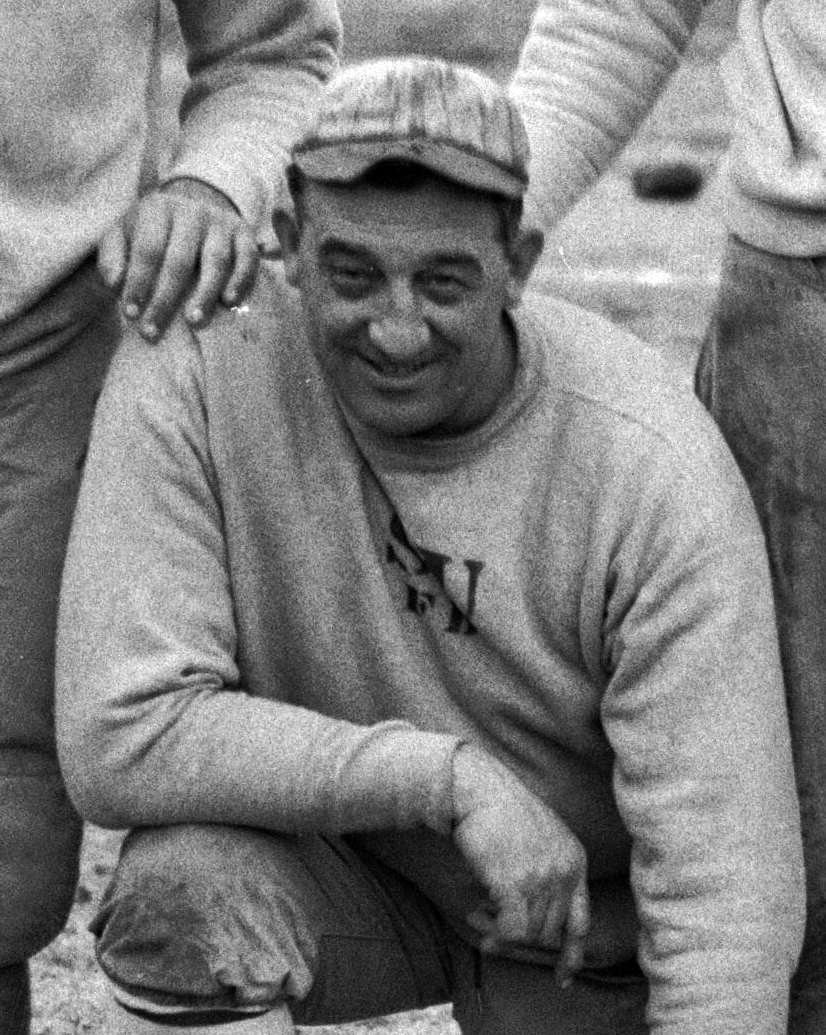
- Head coach Tiny Thornhill
- Conference: Pacific Coast Conference
- Record: 2–5–2 (2–3–2 PCC)
- Head coach: Tiny Thornhill (4th season)
- Home stadium: Stanford Stadium

1936 Pacific Coast Conference football standings
	Conf.					Overall
Team	W		L		T	W		L		T
No. 5 Washington $	7	–	0	–	1	7	–	2	–	1
Washington State	6	–	2	–	1	6	–	3	–	1
USC	3	–	2	–	2	4	–	2	–	3
California	4	–	3	–	0	6	–	5	–	0
UCLA	4	–	3	–	1	6	–	3	–	1
Stanford	2	–	3	–	2	2	–	5	–	2
Oregon State	3	–	5	–	0	4	–	6	–	0
Montana	1	–	3	–	0	6	–	3	–	0
Oregon	1	–	6	–	1	2	–	6	–	1
Idaho	0	–	4	–	0	3	–	7	–	0
$ – Conference champion; Rankings from AP Poll

The 1936 Stanford Indians football team represented Stanford University as a member of the Pacific Coast Conference (PCC) during the 1936 college football season. After winning three consecutive PCC championships the three prior seasons and the 1936 Rose Bowl on January 1, the Indians won only two games in head coach Tiny Thornhill's fourth season at Stanford. With a 2–5–2 record, Stanford lost more games in the 1936 season than in the prior three seasons combined and produced the school's worst season since the 1899 season when the Indians finished with an identical 2–5–2 record. The team played home games at Stanford Stadium in Stanford, California.

== Schedule ==
Date	Opponent	Site	Result	Attendance	Source
September 26	Santa Clara*	Stanford Stadium; Stanford, CA	L 0–13	25,000	
October 3	at Washington State	Rogers Field; Pullman, WA	L 13–14	21,000	
October 10	Oregon	Stanford Stadium; Stanford, CA	T 7–7	18,000	
October 24	No. 6 USC	Stanford Stadium; Stanford, CA (rivalry)	L 7–14	35,000	
October 31	at UCLA	Los Angeles Memorial Coliseum; Los Angeles, CA	W 19–6	30,000	
November 7	No. 6 Washington	Stanford Stadium; Stanford, CA	T 14–14	42,500	
November 14	vs. Oregon State	Multnomah Stadium; Portland, OR	W 20–14		
November 21	at California	California Memorial Stadium; Berkeley, CA (Big Game)	L 0–20	82,000	
November 28	at Columbia*	Polo Grounds; New York, NY	L 0–7	28,000	
*Non-conference game; Rankings from AP Poll released prior to the game; Source:
