= 1936 Texas Tech Matadors football team =

American college football season

1936 Texas Tech Matadors football
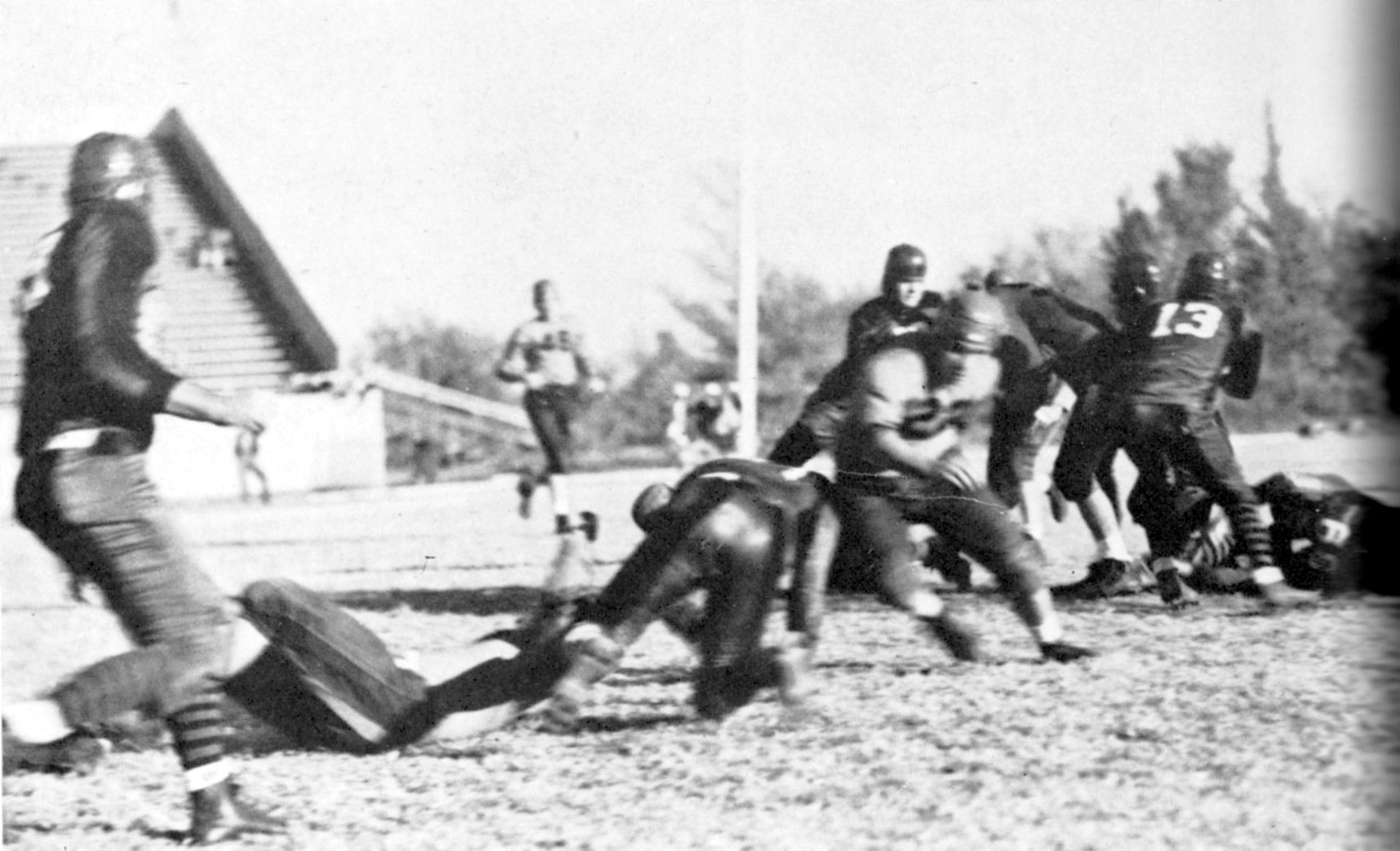
- 1936 Texas Tech football team in action against Oklahoma A&M
- Conference: Border Conference
- Record: 5–4–1 (0–0 Border)
- Head coach: Pete Cawthon (7th season)
- Offensive scheme: Single-wing
- Base defense: 6–2
- Captain: Demp Cannon
- Home stadium: Tech Field

1936 Border Conference football standings
| | Conf. | | | | | Overall |
| Team | W | | L | | T | W | | L | | T |
|---|---|---|---|---|---|---|---|---|---|---|
| Arizona $ | 3 | – | 0 | – | 0 | 5 | – | 2 | – | 3 |
| Texas Mines | 2 | – | 1 | – | 1 | 5 | – | 3 | – | 1 |
| New Mexico A&M | 3 | – | 2 | – | 0 | 6 | – | 4 | – | 1 |
| Arizona State | 2 | – | 3 | – | 0 | 4 | – | 5 | – | 0 |
| Arizona State–Flagstaff | 1 | – | 2 | – | 1 | 3 | – | 4 | – | 1 |
| New Mexico | 1 | – | 4 | – | 0 | 2 | – | 7 | – | 0 |
| Texas Tech | 0 | – | 0 | – | 0 | 5 | – | 4 | – | 1 |
$ – Conference champion; Arizona State and Arizona State–Flagstaff played twice, but only the first meeting counted in the conference standings. The game between Arizona and Texas Tech also did not count in the conference standings.

The 1936 Texas Tech Matadors football team represented Texas Technological College—now known as Texas Tech University—as a member of the Border Conference during the 1936 college football season. Led by seventh-year head coach, the Matadors compiled an overall record of 5–4–1 with a mark of 0–0 in conference play, placing last out of seven teams in the Border Conference. The team played home games at Tech Field in Lubbock, Texas.

== Schedule ==
| Date | Opponent | Site | Result | Attendance | Source |
|---|---|---|---|---|---|
| September 19 | Texas Wesleyan* | Tech Field; Lubbock, TX | W 26–7 | 4,500 | |
| September 26 | TCU* | Tech Field; Lubbock, TX (rivalry) | W 7–0 | 12,000 | |
| October 3 | Oklahoma City* | Tech Field; Lubbock, TX | W 34–6 | 7,000 | |
| October 9 | at Wichita* | Shocker Field; Wichita, KS | L 0–6 | | |
| October 24 | Centenary*^{†} | Tech Field; Lubbock, TX | W 12–6 | 8,000 | |
| November 6 | Oklahoma A&M* | Tech Field; Lubbock, TX | W 12–0 | 7,000 | |
| November 11 | at Loyola (CA)* | Gilmore Stadium; Los Angeles, CA | L 7–26 | 35,000 | |
| November 20 | DePaul* | Tech Field; Lubbock, TX | L 6–13 | 5,000 | |
| November 26 | at Loyola (LA)* | Loyola University Stadium; New Orleans, LA | L 0–13 | 5,000 | |
| December 5 | at Arizona (Note: The game between Arizona and Texas Tech did not count in the Border Conference standings.)* | Arizona Stadium; Tucson, AZ | T 7–7 | 7,500 | |
*Non-conference game; ^{†}Homecoming
