= 1936 Nevada Wolf Pack football team =

American college football season

1936 Nevada Wolf Pack football
- Conference: Far Western Conference
- Record: 4–4 (2–2 FWC)
- Head coach: Doug Dashiell (1st season)
- Home stadium: Mackay Field

1936 Far Western Conference football standings
| | Conf. | | | | | Overall |
| Team | W | | L | | T | W | | L | | T |
|---|---|---|---|---|---|---|---|---|---|---|
| Pacific (CA) $ | 4 | – | 0 | – | 0 | 5 | – | 4 | – | 1 |
| Fresno State | 2 | – | 1 | – | 0 | 5 | – | 3 | – | 1 |
| Nevada | 2 | – | 2 | – | 0 | 4 | – | 4 | – | 0 |
| Cal Aggies | 1 | – | 2 | – | 0 | 3 | – | 4 | – | 0 |
| Chico State | 0 | – | 4 | – | 0 | 1 | – | 6 | – | 1 |
$ – Conference champion

The 1936 Nevada Wolf Pack football team was an American football team that represented the University of Nevada in the Far Western Conference (FWC) during the 1936 college football season. In their first season under head coach Doug Dashiell, the team compiled a 4–4 record (2–2 FWC) and finished third in the conference.

== Schedule ==
| Date | Opponent | Site | Result | Attendance | Source |
|---|---|---|---|---|---|
| October 2 | Idaho Southern Branch* | Mackay Field; Reno, NV | W 21–12 | ~5,000 | |
| October 9 | at Willamette* | Salem, OR | L 9–21 | | |
| October 16 | at Cal Aggies | A Street Field; Davis, CA | W 24–6 | | |
| October 24 | Idaho* | Mackay Field; Reno, NV | W 7–6 | 6,000 | |
| October 31 | Santa Barbara State* | Mackay Field; Reno, NV | L 0–13 | 3,500 | |
| November 6 | at Pacific (CA) | Baxter Stadium; Stockton, CA | L 0–25 | | |
| November 14 | Chico State | Mackay Field; Reno, NV | W 24–7 | 4,000 | |
| November 26 | at Fresno State | Fresno State College Stadium; Fresno, CA | L 6–13 | 6,521 | |
*Non-conference game
