= 1937 Sun Bowl =

American college football game

| Hardin–Simmons Cowboys | Texas Mines Miners |
| (8–2) | (5–3–2) |
| Independent | Border Conference |
| 34 | 6 |
| Head coach: Frank Kimbrough | Head coach: Mack Saxon |
| | 1 | 2 | 3 | 4 | Total |
|---|---|---|---|---|---|
| Hardin–Simmons | 7 | 6 | 14 | 7 | 34 |
| Texas Mines | 0 | 6 | 0 | 0 | 6 |
- Date: January 1, 1937
- Season: 1936
- Stadium: Jones Stadium
- Location: El Paso, Texas
- Referee: Bud Price
- Attendance: 9,000

The 1937 Sun Bowl was a college football postseason bowl game between the Texas Mines Miners and the Hardin–Simmons Cowboys.

== Background ==
This was the first bowl appearance for the Miners; head coach Mack Saxon had been one of the coaches of the El Paso All-Stars, winning team of the inaugural 1935 Sun Bowl, contested between high school teams. This was the second bowl appearance for the Cowboys, who had tied New Mexico A&M in the 1936 Sun Bowl.

== Game summary ==
Si Addington gave the Cowboys a 7–0 lead on his 13-yard touchdown run. O. P. May hit Boyde Arnold for a 40-yard touchdown to respond, but the Miners extra point fell short, keeping the lead 7–6 for Hardin–Simmons. From there on, the Cowboys dominated, scoring 27 straight points and rushing for 421 yards on 71 carries. Pete Tyler scored on a 1-yard touchdown run to make it 13–6 at halftime. Ed Cherry and Tyler added in rushing touchdowns, both from one yard out, to make it 27–6 at the end of three quarters, and White's touchdown made the final score 34–6. Addington rushed for 142 yards on 16 carries. Cherry ran for 83 yards on 19 carries.

== Aftermath ==
This was the final Sun Bowl played at Jones Stadium. The following year, the game was moved to Kidd Field. The Miners are the only team to have made appearances at all three venues of the Sun Bowl.

== Statistics ==
| Statistics | Hardin-Simmons | Texas Western |
|---|---|---|
| First downs | 21 | 8 |
| Yards rushing | 421 | 49 |
| Yards passing | 90 | 97 |
| Total yards | 511 | 146 |
| Punts-Average | 5-41.0 | 8-30.1 |
| Fumbles-Lost | 1-1 | 4-1 |
| Interceptions | 2 | 3 |
| Penalties-Yards | 7-95 | 3-52 |
