= Clyde Starbeck =

American football coach

Biographical details
- Born: January 7, 1900; Montevideo, Minnesota, U.S.
- Died: December 21, 1957 (aged 57); Cedar Falls, Iowa, U.S.

Playing career

Football
- 1923–1926: South Dakota State
- Position: Center

Coaching career (HC unless noted)

Football
- 1927: Eau Claire HS (WI)
- 1928–1935: North Dakota (line)
- 1936–1957: Iowa State Teachers

Basketball
- 1927–1928: Eau Claire HS (WI)

Head coaching record
- Overall: 95–58–10 (college football)

Accomplishments and honors

Championships
- 8 NCC (1940–1942, 1946–1949, 1952)

Clyde L. "Buck" Starbeck (January 7, 1900 – December 21, 1957) was an American football coach. He served as the head football coach at Iowa State Teachers College—now known as the University of Northern Iowa–from 1936 to 1957, compiling a record of 95–58–10. He died on December 21, 1957, in Cedar Falls, Iowa, after suffering a heart attack.

== Head coaching record ==
=== College football ===
Year	Team	Overall	Conference	Standing	Bowl/playoffs
Iowa State Teachers Panthers (North Central Conference) (1936–1957)
1936	Iowa State Teachers	5–2–2	1–2–1	6th	
1937	Iowa State Teachers	2–4–3	2–2–1	T–3rd	
1938	Iowa State Teachers	3–5	0–4	7th	
1939	Iowa State Teachers	5–3–1	3–1	4th	
1940	Iowa State Teachers	8–1	5–0	1st	
1941	Iowa State Teachers	5–3	5–0	1st	
1942	Iowa State Teachers	6–1	5–0	1st	
1943	No team—World War II				
1944	No team—World War II				
1945	Iowa State Teachers	3–3			
1946	Iowa State Teachers	4–1–2	2–0–1	1st	
1947	Iowa State Teachers	5–3–1	4–0	T–1st	
1948	Iowa State Teachers	7–3	5–0	1st	
1949	Iowa State Teachers	5–2	5–1	T–1st	
1950	Iowa State Teachers	4–4	4–2	2nd	
1951	Iowa State Teachers	3–4	3–3	3rd	
1952	Iowa State Teachers	6–2	5–1	1st	
1953	Iowa State Teachers	6–3	5–1	2nd	
1954	Iowa State Teachers	3–5	3–3	T–3rd	
1955	Iowa State Teachers	8–1	5–1	2nd	
1956	Iowa State Teachers	2–5–1	0–5–1	7th	
1957	Iowa State Teachers	5–3	4–2	3rd	
Iowa State Teachers:		95–58–10	56–28–4		
Total:		95–58–10			
National championship Conference title Conference division title or championship game berth
