= 1936 North Dakota Fighting Sioux football team =

American college football season

1936 North Dakota Fighting Sioux football

NCC champion
- Conference: North Central Conference
- Record: 9–2 (4–0 NCC)
- Head coach: Charles A. West (9th season)
- Home stadium: Memorial Stadium

1936 North Central Conference football standings
	Conf.					Overall
Team	W		L		T	W		L		T
North Dakota $	4	–	0	–	0	9	–	2	–	0
South Dakota	3	–	1	–	0	4	–	3	–	2
North Dakota Agricultural	2	–	2	–	0	4	–	5	–	0
Morningside	2	–	3	–	0	3	–	4	–	0
Omaha	1	–	2	–	2	2	–	3	–	2
Iowa State Teachers	1	–	2	–	1	5	–	2	–	2
South Dakota State	1	–	4	–	1	3	–	6	–	1
$ – Conference champion

The 1936 North Dakota Fighting Sioux football team, also known as the Nodaks, was an American football team that represented the University of North Dakota in the North Central Conference (NCC) during the 1936 college football season. In its ninth year under head coach Charles A. West, the team compiled a 9–2 record (4–0 against NCC opponents), won the conference championship, and outscored opponents by a total of 184 to 69.

== Schedule ==
Date	Opponent	Site	Result	Attendance	Source
September 18	St. Thomas (MN)*	Memorial Stadium; Grand Forks, ND	W 21–0		
September 25	Luther*	Memorial Stadium; Grand Forks, ND	W 19–6		
October 2	Moorhead State*	Memorial Stadium; Grand Forks, ND	W 33–6		
October 9	Iowa State Teachers	Memorial Stadium; Grand Forks, ND	W 19–0		
October 17	Saint Louis*	Memorial Stadium; Grand Forks, ND	W 13–6		
October 23	South Dakota State	Memorial Stadium; Grand Forks, ND	W 33–6		
October 31	at North Dakota Agricultural	Dacotah Field; Fargo, ND (rivalry)	W 14–0		
November 7	at DePaul*	Wrigley Field; Chicago, IL	L 6–19	2,000	
November 13	at South Dakota	Vermillion, SD (rivalry)	W 6–0		
November 21	at Detroit*	University of Detroit Stadium; Detroit, MI	W 14–13		
November 26	at Montana*	Dornblaser Field; Missoula, MT	L 6–13	5,000	
*Non-conference game
