= 1936 Arizona State–Flagstaff Lumberjacks football team =

American college football season

1936 Arizona State–Flagstaff Lumberjacks football
- Conference: Border Conference
- Record: 3–4–1 (1–2–1 Border)
- Head coach: Garrett Arbelbide (1st season)
- Home stadium: Skidmore Field

1936 Border Conference football standings
	Conf.					Overall
Team	W		L		T	W		L		T
Arizona $	3	–	0	–	0	5	–	2	–	3
Texas Mines	2	–	1	–	1	5	–	3	–	1
New Mexico A&M	3	–	2	–	0	6	–	4	–	1
Arizona State	2	–	3	–	0	4	–	5	–	0
Arizona State–Flagstaff	1	–	2	–	1	3	–	4	–	1
New Mexico	1	–	4	–	0	2	–	7	–	0
Texas Tech	0	–	0	–	0	5	–	4	–	1
$ – Conference champion; Arizona State and Arizona State–Flagstaff played twice, but only the first meeting counted in the conference standings. The game between Arizona and Texas Tech also did not count in the conference standings.

The 1936 Arizona State–Flagstaff Lumberjacks football team represented the Arizona State Teachers College at Flagstaff (now known as Northern Arizona University) as a member of the Border Conference during the 1936 college football season. Led by first-year head coach Garrett Arbelbide, the Lumberjacks compiled an overall record of 3–4–1, with a mark of 1–2–1 in conference play, placing fifth in the Border Conference.

== Schedule ==
Date	Time	Opponent	Site	Result	Attendance	Source
September 26		Cal Poly*	Skidmore Field; Flagstaff, AZ	W 7–0		
October 3		Santa Barbara State*	Skidmore Field; Flagstaff, AZ	L 6–13		
October 9		at New Mexico A&M	Quesenberry Field; Las Cruces, NM	L 0–41		
October 17		at Fresno State*	Fresno State College Stadium; Fresno, CA	L 6–31	826	
October 24		Arizona State^{†}	Skidmore Field; Flagstaff, AZ	W 19–0	3,500	
November 7		Texas Mines	Skidmore Field; Flagstaff, AZ	T 0–0		
November 21	2:30 p.m.	at Arizona State (Note: The second game between Arizona State–Flagstaff and Arizona State did not count in the Border Conference standings.)*	Goodwin Stadium; Tempe, AZ	W 13–7		
November 26		at New Mexico	University Field; Albuquerque, NM	L 6–25	5,000	
*Non-conference game; ^{†}Homecoming; All times are in Mountain time
