= Mack Saxon =

American sports player and coach (1901–1949)

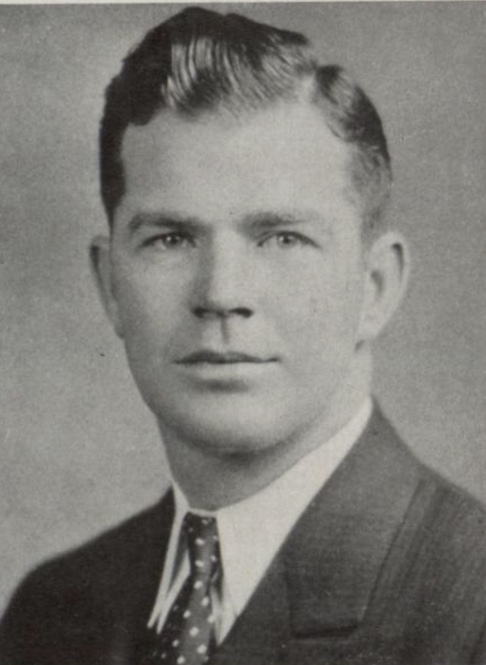

Biographical details
- Born: November 21, 1901; Palestine, Texas, U.S.
- Died: May 8, 1949 (aged 47); Arlington, Virginia, U.S.

Playing career
- 1925–1926: Texas
- Position: Quarterback

Coaching career (HC unless noted)

Football
- 1927–1928: Texas Mines (assistant)
- 1929–1941: Texas Mines

Basketball
- 1928–1934: Texas Mines

Baseball
- 1928, 1930: Texas Mines

Administrative career (AD unless noted)
- 1929–1941: Texas Mines

Head coaching record
- Overall: 66–43–9 (football); 34–61 (basketball); 17–4 (baseball)
- Bowls: 0–1

Accomplishments and honors

Awards
- First-team All-SWC (1925, 1926)

Mack Saxon Sr. (November 21, 1901 – May 8, 1949) was an American football and baseball player, coach of football, basketball, baseball, and track, and athletic administrator.

A Texas native, Saxon was the quarterback of the 1925 and 1926 Texas Longhorns football teams and was selected as an all-conference player in both seasons.

From 1927 to 1941, he served as athletic director and coach at Texas School of Mines (now known as the University of Texas El Paso). He coached the school's football, baseball, basketball, and track teams at various times. In 13 years as the head football coach, he turned the program into a regional power, oversaw the construction of Kidd Field, led the team to its first bowl game, and compiled a 66–43–9 record.

Saxon served in the United States Navy during World War II, supervising an athletic training program for naval flyers. He continued that work as a civilian employee of the Navy after the war before dying of a heart attack at age 47.

== Early life ==
Saxon was born in 1901 in Palestine, Texas, and attended Temple High School in Temple, Texas. He initially attended Austin College in Sherman, Texas, before transferring to the University of Texas. At Texas, he was quarterback of the school's football team during the 1925 and 1926 seasons. He was selected as both the team captain and the most valuable player on the 1926 Texas Longhorns football team. At the end of the 1926 season, he was also selected as the most valuable player, best blocker, best defensive player, and best strategist in the Southwest Conference.

Saxon also played professional baseball as a catcher for two years. He played for the Tyler Trojans in 1927 and for the Palestine Pals in 1927 and 1928.

== Coaching career ==
In 1927, the Texas School of Mines hired E. J. Stewart, who had coached Saxon at Texas, as the school's new head football coach. Saxon joined Stewart in September 1927 as an assistant coach at Texas Mines. In December 1927, Saxon (at age 26) was named Texas Mines' new athletic director, retained his role as assistant football coach, and was also given responsibility to coach the track and baseball teams. He also coached the basketball team beginning in 1928.

Stewart retired as the head football coach after the 1928 season, and Saxon was chosen to replace him. Prior to Saxon taking over as head coach, Texas Mines had only four winning seasons in program history and only one season with a record more than one game above .500. Saxon immediately turned the program around, leading his teams to records of 6–1–2 in 1929, 7–1–1 in 1930, 7–1 in 1931, and 7–3 in 1932.

The popularity of the football program grew under Saxon's leadership, leading to the construction of Kidd Field. In 1935, he served as co-coach of the El Paso All-Stars in the first Sun Bowl game. In 1936, Saxon led his team to a 5–2–1 record in the regular season and a berth in the Sun Bowl game. He followed in 1937 with a 7–1–2 season.

After the 1941 season, Saxon resigned his positions at Texas Mines. In 13 seasons as head coach, Saxon's football teams compiled a 66–43–9 record. As coach of the basketball team from 1928 to 1934, he tallied a mark of 34–61. He also coached the school's baseball team in 1928 and 1930, compiling a 17–4 record.

== Military service, family and later years ==
In May 1941, with the United States on the brink of war, Saxon was commissioned as a lieutenant in the United States Navy. In September 1942, he was placed in charge of the physical fitness program at the Banana River Naval Air Station in Florida. He left active duty in 1945 with the rank of commander. After the war, Saxon remained affiliated with the Navy as a civilian employee in charge of the athletics training program.

On June 1, 1934, Saxon was married to Mary Hilton, the former wife of hotel magnate Conrad Hilton, soon after she and Conrad divorced earlier the same year.

In May 1949, Saxon died at age 47 of a heart attack at his home in Arlington, Virginia. He was buried at Arlington National Cemetery.

== Head coaching record ==
=== Football ===
Year	Team	Overall	Conference	Standing	Bowl/playoffs
Texas Mines Miners (Independent) (1929–1934)
1929	Texas Mines	6–1–2			
1930	Texas Mines	7–1–1			
1931	Texas Mines	7–1			
1932	Texas Mines	7–3			
1933	Texas Mines	3–5–1			
1934	Texas Mines	4–4			
Texas Mines Miners (Border Conference) (1935–1941)
1935	Texas Mines	1–8	0–3	7th	
1936	Texas Mines	5–3–1	2–1–1	2nd	L Sun
1937	Texas Mines	7–1–2	2–1–1	4th	
1938	Texas Mines	6–3	3–2	4th	
1939	Texas Mines	5–4	3–2	4th	
1940	Texas Mines	4–4–1	3–1–1	3rd	
1941	Texas Mines	5–4–1	3–4	6th	
Texas Mines:		66–43–9	16–14–3		
Total:		66–43–9			
