= 1936 Santa Clara Broncos football team =

American college football season

1936 Santa Clara Broncos football

Sugar Bowl champion

Sugar Bowl, W 21–14 vs. LSU
- Conference: Independent

Ranking
- AP: No. 6
- Record: 8–1
- Head coach: Buck Shaw (1st season)
- Home stadium: Kezar Stadium

1936 Western college football independents records
	Conf.			Overall
Team	W	L	T	W		L		T
No. 6 Santa Clara		–		8	–	1	–	0
Humboldt State		–		6	–	3	–	0
Loyola (CA)		–		6	–	3	–	0
Saint Mary's		–		6	–	3	–	1
Gonzaga		–		5	–	3	–	0
Pomona		–		6	–	4	–	0
Cal Poly		–		5	–	4	–	0
San Jose State		–		5	–	4	–	0
Idaho Southern Branch		–		4	–	4	–	0
San Francisco		–		4	–	4	–	2
Portland		–		3	–	4	–	0
San Francisco State		–		2	–	3	–	1
Hawaii		–		3	–	5	–	0
Rankings from AP Poll

The 1936 Santa Clara Broncos football team represented Santa Clara University as an independent during the 1936 college football season. In their first season under head coach Buck Shaw, the Broncos compiled an 8–1 record with five shutouts, and outscored all opponents by a combined total of 139 to 36. In the final AP poll released in late November, Santa Clara was sixth.

The Broncos' victories included a 13–0 besting of Stanford, a 19–0 victory over Saint Mary's and a 21–14 victory over undefeated and second-ranked LSU in the third Sugar Bowl on New Year's Day. The team's lone setback was a 9–0 shutout loss to #16 TCU (with Sammy Baugh) at Kezar Stadium on December 12.

Two Broncos received honors on the 1936 All-Pacific Coast football team: fullback Nello Falaschi (INS-1, UP-1); and guard Dick Bassi (AP-1, INS-1, UP-1).

== Schedule ==
Date	Opponent	Rank	Site	Result	Attendance	Source
September 26	at Stanford		Stanford Stadium; Stanford, CA	W 13–0	25,000	
October 4	Portland		Santa Clara, CA	W 26–0	8,000	
October 11	vs. San Francisco		Kezar Stadium; San Francisco, CA	W 15–7	35,000	
October 17	at San Jose State		Spartan Stadium; San Jose, CA	W 20–0		
October 31	No. 16 Auburn	No. 19	Kezar Stadium; San Francisco, CA	W 12–0	25,000	
November 15	vs. Saint Mary's	No. 9	Kezar Stadium; San Francisco, CA	W 19–0	60,000	
November 22	at Loyola (CA)	No. 9	Los Angeles Memorial Coliseum; Los Angeles, CA	W 13–6	30,000	
December 12	No. 16 TCU	No. 6	Kezar Stadium; San Francisco, CA	L 0–9	45,000	
January 1, 1937	vs. No. 2 LSU	No. 6	Tulane Stadium; New Orleans, LA (Sugar Bowl)	W 21–14	38,483	
Rankings from AP Poll released prior to the game

== After the season ==
=== NFL draft ===
The following Broncos were selected in the 1937 NFL draft following the season.

Round	Pick	Player	Position	NFL team
2	16	Nello Falaschi	Back	Washington Redskins
4	36	Dick Bassi	Guard	Washington Redskins
