= 1936 Portland Pilots football team =

American college football season

1936 Portland Pilots football
- Conference: Independent
- Record: 3–4
- Head coach: Gene Murphy (10th season)
- Home stadium: Multnomah Stadium

1936 Western college football independents records
	Conf.			Overall
Team	W	L	T	W		L		T
No. 6 Santa Clara		–		8	–	1	–	0
Humboldt State		–		6	–	3	–	0
Loyola (CA)		–		6	–	3	–	0
Saint Mary's		–		6	–	3	–	1
Gonzaga		–		5	–	3	–	0
Pomona		–		6	–	4	–	0
Cal Poly		–		5	–	4	–	0
San Jose State		–		5	–	4	–	0
Idaho Southern Branch		–		4	–	4	–	0
San Francisco		–		4	–	4	–	2
Portland		–		3	–	4	–	0
San Francisco State		–		2	–	3	–	1
Hawaii		–		3	–	5	–	0
Rankings from AP Poll

The 1936 Portland Pilots football team was an American football team that represented the University of Portland as an independent during the 1936 college football season. In its tenth and final year under head coach Gene Murphy, the team compiled a 3–4 record. Murphy resigned as Portland's football and baseball coach in December 1936. The team played its home games at Multnomah Stadium in Portland, Oregon.

== Schedule ==
Date	Opponent	Site	Result	Attendance	Source
September 19	Pacific (OR)	Portland, OR	W 15–0		
September 25	at Oregon	Hayward Field; Eugene, OR	L 0–14		
October 4	at Santa Clara	Santa Clara, CA	L 0–26	8,000	
October 10	at Puget Sound	Tacoma, WA	W 13–0		
October 17	at Linfield	McMinnville, OR	W 33–0		
November 1	at San Francisco	Kezar Stadium; San Francisco, CA	L 0–18		
November 15	Gonzaga	Portland, OR	L 3–14		
