= 1936 Chico State Wildcats football team =

American college football season

1936 Chico State Wildcats football
- Conference: Far Western Conference
- Record: 1–6–1 (0–4 FWC)
- Head coach: Art Acker (14th season)
- Home stadium: College Field

1936 Far Western Conference football standings
	Conf.					Overall
Team	W		L		T	W		L		T
Pacific (CA) $	4	–	0	–	0	5	–	4	–	1
Fresno State	2	–	1	–	0	5	–	3	–	1
Nevada	2	–	2	–	0	4	–	4	–	0
Cal Aggies	1	–	2	–	0	3	–	4	–	0
Chico State	0	–	4	–	0	1	–	6	–	1
$ – Conference champion

The 1936 Chico State Wildcats football team represented Chico State College—now known as California State University, Chico—as a member of the Far Western Conference (FWC) during the 1936 college football season. Led by 14th-year head coach Art Acker, Chico State compiled an overall record of 1–6–1 with a mark of 0–4 in conference play, placing last out of five teams in the FWC. The team was outscored by its opponents 137 to 44 for the season. The Wildcats played home games at College Field in Chico, California.

== Schedule ==
Date	Time	Opponent	Site	Result	Attendance	Source
September 26		Menlo*	College Field; Chico, CA	W 13–0	1,200	
October 2	8:00 p.m.	at Sacramento*	Sacramento Stadium; Sacramento, CA	L 0–19		
October 17		Pacific (CA)	College Field; Chico, CA	L 0–20		
October 24		San Francisco State*	Oroville High School; Oroville, CA	T 6–6	2,000	
October 31		at Fresno State	Fresno State College Stadium; Fresno, CA	L 0–38		
November 7		Cal Aggies	College Field; Chico, CA	L 12–16		
November 14		at Nevada	Mackay Stadium (Note: This stadium is the predecessor to the current Mackay Stadium, which was opened for the 1966 season.); Reno, NV	L 7–24	4,000	
November 26		Humboldt State*	College Field; Chico, CA	L 6–14		
*Non-conference game; All times are in Pacific time
