= 1936 San Francisco Dons football team =

American college football season

1936 San Francisco Dons football
- Conference: Independent
- Record: 4–4–2
- Head coach: Spud Lewis (5th season)
- Home stadium: Kezar Stadium

1936 Western college football independents records
	Conf.			Overall
Team	W	L	T	W		L		T
No. 6 Santa Clara		–		8	–	1	–	0
Humboldt State		–		6	–	3	–	0
Loyola (CA)		–		6	–	3	–	0
Saint Mary's		–		6	–	3	–	1
Gonzaga		–		5	–	3	–	0
Pomona		–		6	–	4	–	0
Cal Poly		–		5	–	4	–	0
San Jose State		–		5	–	4	–	0
Idaho Southern Branch		–		4	–	4	–	0
San Francisco		–		4	–	4	–	2
Portland		–		3	–	4	–	0
San Francisco State		–		2	–	3	–	1
Hawaii		–		3	–	5	–	0
Rankings from AP Poll

The 1936 San Francisco Dons football team was an American football team that represented the University of San Francisco as an independent during the 1936 college football season. In their fifth and final season under head coach Spud Lewis, the Dons compiled a 4–4–2 record and were outscored by their opponents by a combined total of 114 to 103.

== Schedule ==
Date	Opponent	Site	Result	Attendance	Source
September 20	St. Mary's (TX)	Kezar Stadium; San Francisco, CA	T 6–6	15,000	
September 26	at Fresno State	Fresno State College Stadium; Fresno, CA	W 14–0	6,169	
October 3	at San Jose State	Spartan Stadium; San Jose, CA	W 13–0	5,000	
October 11	Santa Clara	Kezar Stadium; San Francisco, CA	L 7–15	35,000	
October 18	Saint Mary's	Kezar Stadium; San Francisco, CA	T 0–0	35,000	
October 25	at Gonzaga	Gonzaga Stadium; Spokane, WA	L 7–17		
November 1	Portland	Kezar Stadium; San Francisco, CA	W 18–0		
November 11	No. 15 Texas A&M	Kezar Stadium; San Francisco, CA	L 14–38	20,000	
November 21	at Montana	Clark Field; Butte, MT	L 7–24		
November 29	at Loyola (CA)	Gilmore Stadium; Los Angeles, CA	W 17–14	10,000	
Rankings from AP Poll released prior to the game
