= 1936 Arizona State Bulldogs football team =

American college football season

1936 Arizona State Bulldogs football
- Conference: Border Conference
- Record: 4–5 (2–3 Border)
- Head coach: Rudy Lavik (4th season)
- Captain: John Rouse
- Home stadium: Goodwin Stadium

1936 Border Conference football standings
	Conf.					Overall
Team	W		L		T	W		L		T
Arizona $	3	–	0	–	0	5	–	2	–	3
Texas Mines	2	–	1	–	1	5	–	3	–	1
New Mexico A&M	3	–	2	–	0	6	–	4	–	1
Arizona State	2	–	3	–	0	4	–	5	–	0
Arizona State–Flagstaff	1	–	2	–	1	3	–	4	–	1
New Mexico	1	–	4	–	0	2	–	7	–	0
Texas Tech	0	–	0	–	0	5	–	4	–	1
$ – Conference champion; Arizona State and Arizona State–Flagstaff played twice, but only the first meeting counted in the conference standings. The game between Arizona and Texas Tech also did not count in the conference standings.

The 1936 Arizona State Bulldogs football team was an American football team that represented Arizona State Teachers College (later renamed Arizona State University) in the Border Conference during the 1936 college football season. In their fourth season under head coach Rudy Lavik, the Bulldogs compiled an overall record of 4–5 record with a mark of 2–3 in conference play, placing fourth in the Border Conference, and were outscored 109 to 83. The team captain was right end John Rouse. This was the first season during which all home games were played at Goodwin Stadium in Tempe, Arizona.

== Schedule ==
Date	Time	Opponent	Site	Result	Attendance	Source
September 25		at Whittier*	Hadley Field; Whittier, CA	W 12–0		
October 3		Caltech*	Goodwin Stadium; Tempe, AZ	W 26–0		
October 10		Arizona	Goodwin Stadium; Tempe, AZ (rivalry)	L 0–18		
October 24		at Arizona State–Flagstaff	Skidmore Field; Flagstaff, AZ	L 0–19	3,500	
October 31		New Mexico	Goodwin Stadium; Tempe, AZ	W 7–6		
November 7		New Mexico A&M	Goodwin Stadium; Tempe, AZ	L 6–20		
November 14		at Texas Mines	Kidd Field; El Paso, TX	W 19–0	4,000	
November 21	2:30 p.m.	Arizona State–Flagstaff (Note: The second game between Arizona State and Arizona State–Flagstaff did not count in the Border Conference standings.)*^{†}	Goodwin Stadium; Tempe, AZ	L 7–13		
November 26		at San Jose State*	Spartan Stadium; San Jose, CA	L 6–33	5,000	
*Non-conference game; ^{†}Homecoming; All times are in Mountain time

.

== Game summaries ==
In the season opener, Arizona State delivered a 12-0 road shutout victory over Whittier. The Bulldogs produced a 26-0 shutout win against California Tech in their first ever home game at Goodwin Stadium. Arizona State suffered an 18-0 shutout loss to Arizona in Tempe. The Bulldogs were shutout for a second consecutive game, as they dropped a 19-0 road contest at Arizona State Teachers College at Flagstaff (ASTCF, later renamed Northern Arizona University). Arizona State rebounded with a 7-6 home win over New Mexico. The Bulldogs fell to New Mexico State 20-6 at Goodwin Stadium. Arizona State was dealt a 33-6 road loss at San Jose State. In the home finale, the Bulldogs dropped a 13-7 home game to ASTCF. Arizona State closed the season with a 19-0 shutout victory against Texas-El Paso on the road.

== Roster ==
The usual Arizona State lineup included left end Paul Guthrie, left tackle Al Dalmolin, left guard Buss Watts, center Bob Buntz, right guard Howard Wynn, right tackle Steve Setka, right end John Rouse, quarterback Bill Parry, halfbacks Howard Hooton and Glenn Shafer, and fullback Everett Jenkens.

Guy Acuff, Al Arivizu, Stanford Brimhall, Francis Clevenger, Jim Curtis, and Bennet Davis were also on the roster.

== Awards ==
Left tackle Al Dalmolin earned All-Border Conference honors for the 1936 football season.
