= 1936 Gonzaga Bulldogs football team =

American college football season

1936 Gonzaga Bulldogs football
- Conference: Independent
- Record: 5–3
- Head coach: Mike Pecarovich (6th season)
- Home stadium: Gonzaga Stadium

1936 Western college football independents records
	Conf.			Overall
Team	W	L	T	W		L		T
No. 6 Santa Clara		–		8	–	1	–	0
Humboldt State		–		6	–	3	–	0
Loyola (CA)		–		6	–	3	–	0
Saint Mary's		–		6	–	3	–	1
Gonzaga		–		5	–	3	–	0
Pomona		–		6	–	4	–	0
Cal Poly		–		5	–	4	–	0
San Jose State		–		5	–	4	–	0
Idaho Southern Branch		–		4	–	4	–	0
San Francisco		–		4	–	4	–	2
Portland		–		3	–	4	–	0
San Francisco State		–		2	–	3	–	1
Hawaii		–		3	–	5	–	0
Rankings from AP Poll

The 1936 Gonzaga Bulldogs football team was an American football team that represented Gonzaga University during the 1936 college football season. In their sixth year under head coach Mike Pecarovich, the Bulldogs compiled a 5–3 record and outscored all opponents by a total of 98 to 73.

Fullback George Karamatic led the team's offense and received first-team honors from the Associated Press and United Press on the 1936 All-Pacific Coast football team. Karamatic later played in the National Football League for the Washington Redskins.

== Schedule ==
Date	Opponent	Site	Result	Attendance	Source
September 27	at Saint Mary's	Kezar Stadium; San Francisco CA	L 13–26	25,000	
October 2	Cheney Normal	Gonzaga Stadium; Spokane, WA	W 27–7	3,000	
October 17	at Montana	Dornblaser Field; Missoula, MT	L 0–6	6,000	
October 25	San Francisco	Gonzaga Stadium; Spokane, WA	W 17–7		
October 31	Idaho	Gonzaga Stadium; Spokane, WA (rivalry)	L 6–18	8,500	
November 15	at Portland	Portland, OR	W 14–3		
November 21	at Puget Sound	Tacoma, WA	W 8–0		
December 5	No. 20 Washington State	Gonzaga Stadium; Spokane, WA	W 13–6	6,000	
Rankings from Coaches' Poll released prior to the game
