= 1936 Cal Aggies football team =

American college football season

1936 Cal Aggies football
- Conference: Far Western Conference
- Record: 3–4 (1–2 FWC)
- Head coach: Crip Toomey (9th season)
- Captain: Chris Graves
- Home stadium: A Street field

1936 Far Western Conference football standings
	Conf.					Overall
Team	W		L		T	W		L		T
Pacific (CA) $	4	–	0	–	0	5	–	4	–	1
Fresno State	2	–	1	–	0	5	–	3	–	1
Nevada	2	–	2	–	0	4	–	4	–	0
Cal Aggies	1	–	2	–	0	3	–	4	–	0
Chico State	0	–	4	–	0	1	–	6	–	1
$ – Conference champion

The 1936 Cal Aggies football team represented the Northern Branch of the College of Agriculture—now known as the University of California, Davis—as a member of the Far Western Conference (FWC) during the 1936 college football season. Led by Crip Toomey in his ninth and final season as head coach, the Aggies compiled an overall record of 3–4 with a mark of 1–2 in conference play, placing fourth in the FWC. The team was outscored by its opponents 115 to 86 for the season. The Cal Aggies played home games at A Street field on campus in Davis, California.

In nine years under Toomey, the Aggies compiled a record of 24–42–8, for a winning percentage of .378. Toomey also served as the head coach of the Aggies basketball team for eight seasons during the same time period. In addition, he was the athletic director for the school from 1928 until his death in 1961. To honor his contributions to the UC Davis, Aggie Field, which opened the school's new football stadium in 1949, was renamed Toomey Field in 1962.

== Schedule ==
Date	Time	Opponent	Site	Result	Attendance	Source
September 26		at California*	California Memorial Stadium; Berkeley, CA	L 0–39		
October 2		Humboldt State*	A Street field; Davis, CA	W 18–0		
October 16		Nevada	A Street field; Davis, CA	L 6–24		
October 23	8:00 p.m.	at Sacramento*	Sacramento Stadium; Sacramento, CA	L 0–20	6,020	
October 31		at Pacific (CA)	Baxter Stadium; Stockton, CA	L 0–13		
November 7		at Chico State	Chico High School Stadium; Chico, CA	W 16–12		
November 14		La Verne*	A Street field; Davis, CA	W 46–7		
*Non-conference game; All times are in Pacific time
