= 1936 Santa Barbara State Gauchos football team =

American college football season

1936 Santa Barbara State Gauchos football
- Conference: Southern California Conference
- Record: 9–1 (4–1 SCC)
- Head coach: Spud Harder (3rd season)
- Home stadium: Peabody Stadium

1936 Southern California Conference football standings
	Conf.					Overall
Team	W		L		T	W		L		T
San Diego State $	5	–	0	–	0	6	–	1	–	1
Santa Barbara State	4	–	1	–	0	9	–	1	–	0
Whittier	3	–	2	–	0	5	–	5	–	0
Redlands	2	–	3	–	0	2	–	6	–	0
Occidental	1	–	4	–	0	3	–	5	–	1
La Verne	0	–	5	–	0	1	–	7	–	0
$ – Conference champion

The 1936 Santa Barbara State Gauchos football team represented Santa Barbara State (Note: University of California, Santa Barbara was known as Santa Barbara State College from 1921 to 1943.) during the 1936 college football season.

Santa Barbara State competed in the Southern California Intercollegiate Athletic Conference (SCIAC). The Gauchos were led by third-year head coach Theodore "Spud" Harder and played home games in Santa Barbara, California, some at Peabody Stadium and others at Pershing Field. They finished the season with a record of nine wins and one loss (9–1, 4–1 SCIAC), with the only blemish a one-point loss to San Diego State. Overall, the team outscored its opponents 223–43 for the season. The Gauchos had five shutouts, and held the other team to a touchdown or less in 8 of 10 games.

Four Santa Barbara players were selected as first-team players on the All-Southern Conference football team for 1936: guard Doug Oldershaw, tackle Claire Busby, end Al Young, and halfback Howard Yeager. Center D. Hart and halfback Bob Morelli received second-team honors. Yeager averaged 10.7 yards per carry in 1936.

== Schedule ==
Date	Opponent	Site	Result	Attendance	Source
September 25	Caltech*	Pershing Field; Santa Barbara, CA	W 37–6		
October 3	at Arizona State–Flagstaff*	Skidmore Field; Flagstaff, AZ	W 13–6		
October 9	Redlands	Peabody Stadium; Santa Barbara, CA	W 13–0		
October 18	La Verne	Pershing Field; Santa Barbara, CA	W 24–0		
October 23	Whittier	Pershing Park; Santa Barbara, CA	W 26–0	6,000	
October 31	at Nevada*	Mackay Field (Note: This stadium is the predecessor to the current Mackay Stadium, which was opened for the 1966 season."University of Nevada, Reno; Mackay Stadium".); Reno, NV	W 13–0	3,500	
November 7	San Francisco State*	Peabody Stadium; Santa Barbara, CA	W 37–7		
November 13	Occidental	Peabody Stadium; Santa Barbara, CA	W 27–0		
November 21	at San Diego State	Aztec Bowl; San Diego, CA	L 8–9	9,000	
December 25	New Mexico A&M*	Peabody Stadium; Santa Barbara, CA	W 25–14	6,000	
*Non-conference game
