= 1936 North Dakota Agricultural Bison football team =

American college football season

1936 North Dakota Agricultural Bison football
- Conference: North Central Conference
- Record: 4–5 (2–2 NCC)
- Head coach: Casey Finnegan (8th season)
- Captain: Bob Erickson
- Home stadium: Dacotah Field

1936 North Central Conference football standings
	Conf.					Overall
Team	W		L		T	W		L		T
North Dakota $	4	–	0	–	0	9	–	2	–	0
South Dakota	3	–	1	–	0	4	–	3	–	2
North Dakota Agricultural	2	–	2	–	0	4	–	5	–	0
Morningside	2	–	3	–	0	3	–	4	–	0
Omaha	1	–	2	–	2	2	–	3	–	2
Iowa State Teachers	1	–	2	–	1	5	–	2	–	2
South Dakota State	1	–	4	–	1	3	–	6	–	1
$ – Conference champion

The 1936 North Dakota Agricultural Bison football team was an American football team that represented North Dakota Agricultural College (now known as North Dakota State University) in the North Central Conference (NCC) during the 1936 college football season. In its eighth season under head coach Casey Finnegan, the team compiled a 4–5 record (2–2 against NCC opponents) and finished in third place out of seven teams in the NCC. The team played its home games at Dacotah Field in Fargo, North Dakota.

== Schedule ==
Date	Opponent	Site	Result	Attendance	Source
September 18	Omaha	Dacotah Field; Fargo, ND	W 18–13		
September 26	at Winnipeg Blue Bombers*	Osborne Stadium; Winnipeg, MB	L 13–33		
October 2	Concordia (MN)*	Dacotah Field; Fargo, ND	W 15–0		
October 10	at Northwestern*	Dyche Stadium; Evanston, IL	L 7–40	25,000	
October 16	Moorhead State*	Dacotah Field; Fargo, ND	W 14–7		
October 24	at Morningside	Stock Yards Park; Sioux City, IA	L 0–7		
October 31	North Dakota^{†}	Dacotah Field; Fargo, ND (rivalry)	L 0–14		
November 14	vs. South Dakota State	East Side Field; Sioux Falls, SD (rivalry)	W 7–0		
November 21	at Idaho*	MacLean Field; Moscow, ID	L 12–13	3,200	
*Non-conference game; ^{†}Homecoming
