= 1936 South Dakota Coyotes football team =

American college football season

1936 South Dakota Coyotes football
- Conference: North Central Conference
- Record: 4–3–2 (3–1 NCC)
- Head coach: Harry Gamage (3rd season)
- Home stadium: Inman Field

1936 North Central Conference football standings
	Conf.					Overall
Team	W		L		T	W		L		T
North Dakota $	4	–	0	–	0	9	–	2	–	0
South Dakota	3	–	1	–	0	4	–	3	–	2
North Dakota Agricultural	2	–	2	–	0	4	–	5	–	0
Morningside	2	–	3	–	0	3	–	4	–	0
Omaha	1	–	2	–	2	2	–	3	–	2
Iowa State Teachers	1	–	2	–	1	5	–	2	–	2
South Dakota State	1	–	4	–	1	3	–	6	–	1
$ – Conference champion

The 1936 South Dakota Coyotes football team was an American football team that represented the University of South Dakota in the North Central Conference (NCC) during the 1936 college football season. In their third season under head coach Harry Gamage, the Coyotes compiled a 4–3–2 record (3–1 against NCC opponents), finished in second place out of seven teams in the NCC, and outscored opponents by a total of 105 to 94. The team played its home games at Inman Field in Vermillion, South Dakota.

== Schedule ==
Date	Opponent	Site	Result	Attendance	Source
September 19	Sioux Falls*	Inman Field; Vermillion, SD	W 25–6		
September 25	at Creighton*	Creighton Stadium; Omaha, NE	L 0–24		
October 3	Parsons*	Inman Field; Vermillion, SD	T 7–7		
October 10	at Iowa*	Iowa Stadium; Iowa City, IA	L 7–33	> 10,000	
October 17	Morningside^{†}	Inman Field; Vermillion, SD (Dakota Day)	W 25–12		
October 23	at Saint Louis*	Walsh Memorial Stadium; St. Louis, MO	T 6–6	4,765	
October 31	at South Dakota State	Brookings, SD (Hobo Day, rivalry)	W 6–0		
November 7	at Omaha	Omaha, NE	W 29–0		
November 14	North Dakota	Inman Field; Vermillion, SD (rivalry)	L 0–6		
*Non-conference game; ^{†}Homecoming
