= 1936 California Golden Bears football team =

American college football season

1936 California Golden Bears football
- Conference: Pacific Coast Conference
- Record: 6–5 (4–3 PCC)
- Head coach: Stub Allison (2nd season)
- Home stadium: California Memorial Stadium

1936 Pacific Coast Conference football standings
	Conf.					Overall
Team	W		L		T	W		L		T
No. 5 Washington $	7	–	0	–	1	7	–	2	–	1
Washington State	6	–	2	–	1	6	–	3	–	1
USC	3	–	2	–	2	4	–	2	–	3
California	4	–	3	–	0	6	–	5	–	0
UCLA	4	–	3	–	1	6	–	3	–	1
Stanford	2	–	3	–	2	2	–	5	–	2
Oregon State	3	–	5	–	0	4	–	6	–	0
Montana	1	–	3	–	0	6	–	3	–	0
Oregon	1	–	6	–	1	2	–	6	–	1
Idaho	0	–	4	–	0	3	–	7	–	0
$ – Conference champion; Rankings from AP Poll

The 1936 California Golden Bears football team was an American football team that represented the University of California, Berkeley during the 1936 college football season. Under head coach Stub Allison, the team compiled an overall record of 6–5 and 4–3 in conference.

== Schedule ==
Date	Opponent	Site	Result	Attendance	Source
September 26	Pacific (CA)*	California Memorial Stadium; Berkeley, CA	W 14–0	34,000	
September 26	Cal Aggies*	California Memorial Stadium; Berkeley, CA	W 39–0	34,000	
October 3	Saint Mary's*	California Memorial Stadium; Berkeley, CA	L 0–10	60,000	
October 10	at Oregon State	Multnomah Stadium; Portland, OR	W 7–0	15,000	
October 17	UCLA	California Memorial Stadium; Berkeley, CA (rivalry)	L 6–17	30,000	
October 24	at No. 8 Washington	Husky Stadium; Seattle, WA	L 0–13	18,315	
October 31	Washington State	California Memorial Stadium; Berkeley, CA	L 13–14	35,000	
November 7	at No. 11 USC	Los Angeles Memorial Coliseum; Los Angeles, CA	W 13–7	65,000	
November 14	Oregon	California Memorial Stadium; Berkeley, CA	W 28–0		
November 21	Stanford	California Memorial Stadium; Berkeley, CA (Big Game)	W 20–0	82,000	
December 26	at Georgia Tech*	Grant Field; Atlanta, GA	L 7–13	15,000	
*Non-conference game; Rankings from AP Poll released prior to the game; Source:
