= Dick Tomey Legacy Game =

American college football rivalry

- San Jose State Spartans Hawaii Rainbow Warriors
- Sport: American football
- Type: Collegiate
- First meeting: December 11, 1936; San Jose State, 13–8
- Latest meeting: October 3, 2026; San Jose State, 20–16
- Stadiums: CEFCU and Clarence T. C. Ching
- Trophy: Dick Tomey Legacy Trophy

Statistics
- Total meetings: 48
- All-time series: San Jose State leads, 25–22–1
- Trophy series: San Jose State leads, 6–1
- Largest victory: San Jose State, 48–6 (1960)
- Longest win streak: Hawaii, 7 (2001–2007)
- Current win streak: San Jose State, 6 (2020–Present)

Locations of University of Hawaiʻi at Mānoa and San José State University

The Dick Tomey Legacy Game is the name given to the Hawaii–San Jose State football rivalry. It is a college football rivalry between the Hawaiʻi Rainbow Warriors football team of the University of Hawaiʻi at Mānoa and the San José State Spartans football team of San José State University. Since 1936, the two teams have played each other 47 times. Beginning in 2019 the winner of the game receives the Dick Tomey Legacy Trophy. As of 2026, San Jose State leads, 25–22–1.

== Historical overview ==
The series between San Jose State and Hawaii began in 1936 with a game in Honolulu, which San Jose State won 13–8. Two years later in 1938, Hawaiʻi won their first game of the series, a 13–12 victory in Honolulu.

In 1941, the San Jose State Spartans football team served unexpectedly with the Honolulu Police Department during World War II. The team had just arrived in Hawaii to play a series of postseason bowl games, known as the Shrine Bowl, against the Hawaii Rainbow Warriors and the Willamette University Bearcats when the U.S. Navy base at Pearl Harbor was attacked on December 7, 1941. The team was stranded on the islands for a number of weeks following the attack, and players were employed by the local police department to help improve island defenses against a possible Japanese amphibious assault and as guards for military bases on the island. They were rescued on December 19 aboard the SS President Coolidge.

In 1996, San José State joined the Western Athletic Conference, making the pair conference rivals. In 2007, Hawaiʻi had their seventh consecutive win, the longest win-streak of the series. In 2012, Hawaiʻi moved their football team to the Mountain West Conference, they were followed by San José State the following year, allowing the teams to continue to be conference rivals.

Beginning in 2019, after the death of former Hawaii and San Jose State head coach Dick Tomey, the Dick Tomey Legacy Trophy was introduced for the winner of the game.

== Statistics ==
Source:	San José State	Hawaiʻi
Games played	48	
Wins	25	22
Ties	1	
Home wins	8	13
Road wins	17	9
Consecutive wins	6	7
Most total points in a game	105 (2000)	
Most points in a win	57 (2000)	62 (1999)
Most points in a loss	41 (1999, 2018)	48 (2000)
Fewest total points in a game	12 (1957)	
Largest margin of victory	42 (1960)	37 (2006)
Smallest margin of victory	1 (1937, 2011)	1 (1938)
Total points scored in series	1,262	1,124
Shut-outs of opposing team	4 (1955, 1957, 1962, 2023)	2 (1956, 2014)

== Game results ==
San Jose State victories	Hawaii victories	Tie games

No.	Date	Location	Winner	Score
1	December 11, 1936	Honolulu, HI	San Jose State	13–8
2	December 4, 1937	Honolulu, HI	San Jose State	7–6
3	December 3, 1938	Honolulu, HI	Hawaii	13–12
4	September 9, 1955	San Jose, CA	San Jose State	34–0
5	November 30, 1956	Honolulu, HI	Hawaii	20–0
6	November 30, 1957	Honolulu, HI	San Jose State	12–0
7	September 27, 1958	San Jose, CA	Hawaii	8–6
8	October 3, 1959	San Jose, CA	San Jose State	44–14
9	December 2, 1960	Honolulu, HI	San Jose State	48–6
10	November 30, 1962	Honolulu, HI	San Jose State	19–0
11	November 25, 1972	Honolulu, HI	Hawaii	28–14
12	November 24, 1973	Honolulu, HI	San Jose State	23–3
13	November 9, 1974	Honolulu, HI	San Jose State	32–11
14	November 29, 1975	Honolulu, HI	Hawaii	30–20
15	September 11, 1976	San Jose, CA	San Jose State	48–7
16	November 5, 1977	San Jose, CA	San Jose State	24–14
17	October 7, 1978	Honolulu, HI	Hawaii	25–11
18	September 17, 1988	Honolulu, HI	Hawaii	36–27
19	November 16, 1991	San Jose, CA	Tie	35–35
20	November 9, 1996	Honolulu, HI	San Jose State	38–17
21	November 15, 1997	San Jose, CA	San Jose State	38–14
22	November 7, 1998	Honolulu, HI	San Jose State	45–17
23	November 6, 1999	San Jose, CA	Hawaii	62–41
24	October 28, 2000	Honolulu, HI	San Jose State	57–48
25	November 3, 2001	Honolulu, HI	Hawaii	34–10

No.	Date	Location	Winner	Score
26	November 2, 2002	Honolulu, HI	Hawaii	40–31
27	November 1, 2003	San Jose, CA	Hawaii	13–10
28	October 23, 2004	Honolulu, HI	Hawaii	46–28
29	October 22, 2005	San Jose, CA	Hawaii	45–38
30	November 18, 2006	Honolulu, HI	Hawaii	54–17
31	October 12, 2007	San Jose, CA	#16 Hawaii	42–35^{OT}
32	September 27, 2008	Honolulu, HI	San Jose State	20–17
33	November 21, 2009	San Jose, CA	Hawaii	17–10^{OT}
34	November 20, 2010	Honolulu, HI	Hawaii	41–7
35	October 14, 2011	San Jose, CA	San Jose State	28–27
36	October 6, 2013	Honolulu, HI	San Jose State	37–27
37	November 15, 2014	San Jose, CA	Hawaii	13–0
38	November 21, 2015	Honolulu, HI	San Jose State	42–23
39	October 8, 2016	San Jose, CA	Hawaii	34–17
40	October 14, 2017	Honolulu, HI	Hawaii	37–26
41	September 29, 2018	San Jose, CA	Hawaii	44–41^{5OT}
42	November 9, 2019	Honolulu, HI	Hawaii	42–40
43	December 5, 2020	Honolulu, HI	San Jose State	35–24
44	September 19, 2021	Honolulu, HI	San Jose State	17–13
45	November 26, 2022	San Jose, CA	San Jose State	27–14
46	October 28, 2023	Honolulu, HI	San Jose State	35–0
47	November 1, 2025	San Jose, CA	San Jose State	45–38
48	October 3, 2026	Honolulu, HI	San Jose State	20–16
Series: San Jose State leads 25–22–1

== See also ==
- List of NCAA college football rivalry games
