= 1936 Pittsburgh Panthers football team =

American college football season

1936 Pittsburgh Panthers football
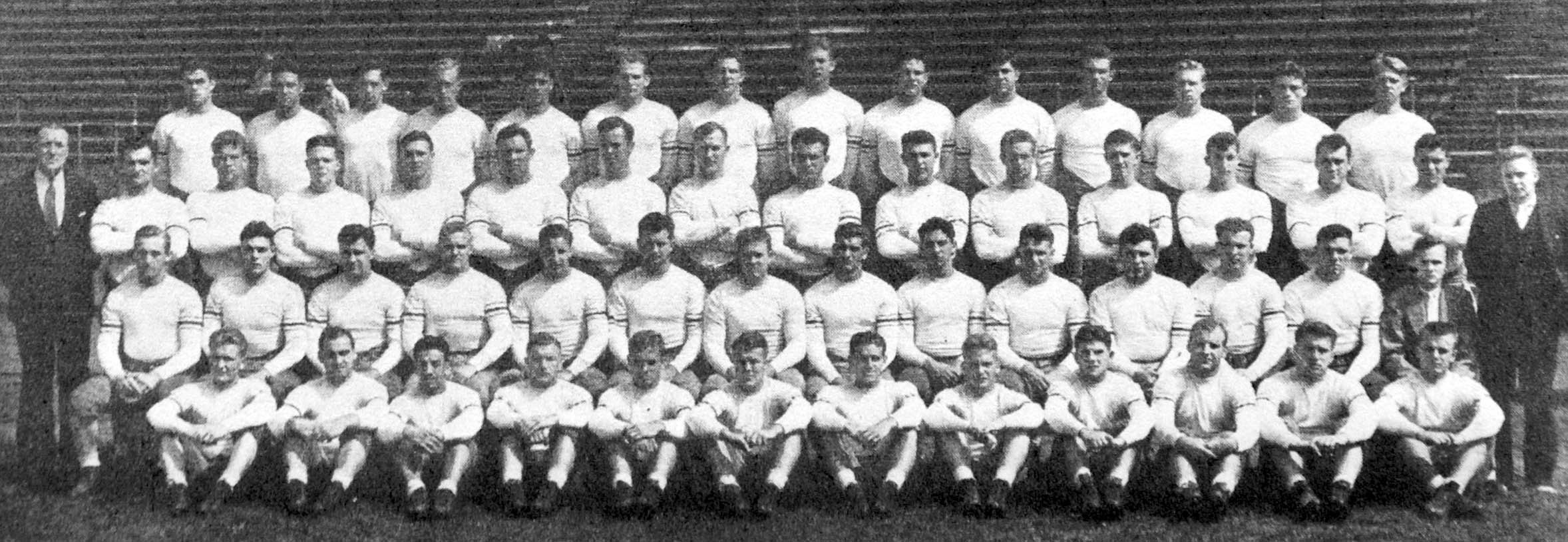

National champion (Boand, FR, Houlgate) Eastern champion Rose Bowl champion

Rose Bowl, W 21–0 vs. Washington
- Conference: Independent

Ranking
- AP: No. 3
- Record: 8–1–1
- Head coach: Jock Sutherland (13th season)
- Offensive scheme: Single wing
- Home stadium: Pitt Stadium

1936 Eastern college football independents records
	Conf.			Overall
Team	W	L	T	W		L		T
Middlebury		–		8	–	0	–	0
Saint Anselm		–		6	–	0	–	1
No. 3 Pittsburgh		–		8	–	1	–	1
No. 10 Penn		–		7	–	1	–	0
No. 12 Yale		–		7	–	1	–	0
No. 13 Dartmouth		–		7	–	1	–	1
Franklin & Marshall		–		7	–	1	–	1
No. 14 Duquesne		–		8	–	2	–	0
Boston College		–		6	–	1	–	2
Boston University		–		5	–	1	–	2
No. 15 Fordham		–		5	–	1	–	2
Holy Cross		–		7	–	2	–	1
Villanova		–		7	–	2	–	1
Army		–		6	–	3	–	0
Colgate		–		6	–	3	–	0
Drexel		–		6	–	3	–	0
Temple		–		6	–	3	–	2
La Salle		–		6	–	3	–	1
Buffalo		–		5	–	3	–	0
Columbia		–		5	–	3	–	0
Princeton		–		4	–	2	–	2
Saint Vincent		–		5	–	3	–	0
NYU		–		5	–	3	–	1
Manhattan		–		6	–	4	–	0
Northeastern		–		5	–	4	–	0
Bucknell		–		4	–	4	–	1
CCNY		–		4	–	4	–	0
Tufts		–		3	–	3	–	1
Harvard		–		3	–	4	–	1
Cornell		–		3	–	5	–	0
Penn State		–		3	–	5	–	0
Westminster (PA)		–		2	–	4	–	1
Brown		–		3	–	7	–	0
Carnegie Tech		–		2	–	6	–	0
Massachusetts State		–		2	–	6	–	0
Providence		–		1	–	7	–	0
Syracuse		–		1	–	7	–	0
Vermont		–		1	–	8	–	0
Rankings from AP Poll

The 1936 Pittsburgh Panthers football team represented the University of Pittsburgh as an independent during the 1936 college football season. In its 13th season under head coach Jock Sutherland, the team compiled a 8–1–1 record, shut out five of its ten opponents, and outscored all opponents by a total of 214 to 34. The team played its home games at Pitt Stadium in Pittsburgh. The Panthers won the Rose Bowl and were selected national champion by the contemporary Boand and Houlgate math systems and retroactively years later by the Football Researchers poll.

== Schedule ==
Date	Opponent	Rank	Site	Result	Attendance	Source
September 26	Ohio Wesleyan		Pitt Stadium; Pittsburgh, PA	W 53–0	19,000	
October 3	West Virginia		Pitt Stadium; Pittsburgh, PA (rivalry)	W 34–0	21,000	
October 10	at Ohio State		Ohio Stadium; Columbus, OH	W 6–0	71,714	
October 17	Duquesne		Pitt Stadium; Pittsburgh, PA	L 0–7	20,000	
October 24	No. 7 Notre Dame	No. 9	Pitt Stadium; Pittsburgh, PA	W 26–0	70,244	
October 31	at No. 5 Fordham	No. 2	Polo Grounds; New York, NY	T 0–0	55,000–57,000	
November 7	Penn State	No. 5	Pitt Stadium; Pittsburgh, PA (rivalry)	W 34–7	15,692	
November 14	at No. 6 Nebraska	No. 5	Memorial Stadium; Lincoln, NE	W 19–6	35,000	
November 26	Carnegie Tech	No. 4	Pitt Stadium; Pittsburgh, PA	W 31–14	40,000	
January 1, 1937	vs. No. 5 Washington	No. 3	Rose Bowl; Pasadena, CA (Rose Bowl)	W 21–0	87,935	
Rankings from AP Poll released prior to the game

== Preseason ==
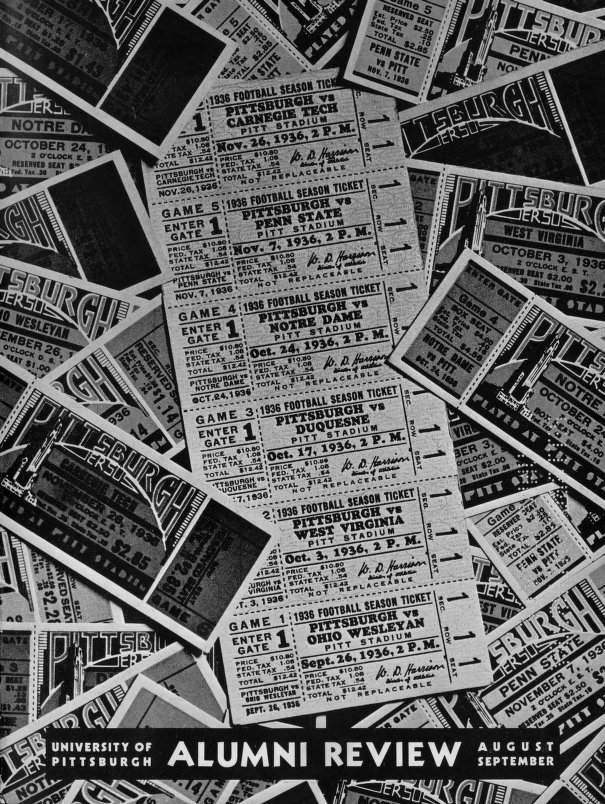
1936 University of Pittsburgh football ticket collage

On March 10, the athletic committee named John Bailey (Dentistry 1937), William Blair (Business Administration 1937) and William Housel (College 1937) varsity football managers for the 1936 season. Unfortunately, Mr. Housel, who was voted Outstanding Junior on Campus, died from peritonitis while attending ROTC summer camp at Point Marion, Virginia. The Panther nation was also saddened when Peter Aviziensis, a junior substitute tackle, died after being operated on for a brain tumor.

With the early arrival of suitable weather, Coach Sutherland decided to start his spring training on March 16. He encouraged anyone who wanted to play to try out: "Not only do we want those boys who have played football in high school, but we also welcome those who have never played football. There are suits for everyone." Fifty prospective varsity Panthers attended the drills. Coach Sutherland spent two weeks in the hospital with a sore back, but he was ably replaced by assistant coach Bill Kern. After two weeks of individual instruction, scrimmages were held on Saturdays pitting the first team versus the second team. The first team won four games and the fifth was a scoreless tie. On May 9 the session came to end with an Alumni versus Varsity game at the Stadium in conjunction with the Pitt – Penn State track meet. The Varsity had no trouble with the Alumni, cruising to a 47–6 victory. The Alumni scored first, but the Varsity went ahead 7–6 before halftime. The second half was all Varsity, as they totaled 6 touchdowns over the last two periods. The Panther varsity track team earlier beat Penn State 70–65. The freshman team lost 76–59, but John Woodruff, Pitt freshman, won both the 880-yard dash and the mile. He then went on to win the Olympic gold medal on August 4, 1936 in Berlin with a time of 1:52.9.

Coach Sutherland held his Fifth Annual Football Clinic on May 23 at Pitt Stadium. Jock Sutherland, Fritz Crisler (Princeton) and Wallace Wade (Duke) explained the intricacies of playing football with lectures and on-field demonstrations to 1,000 eager coaches and players.

On September 7, Coach Sutherland welcomed more than fifty Panthers for his thirteenth preseason training camp at Pitt. Since Camp Hamilton was damaged by floods in March, the Panthers trained at Trees Field on the Pitt campus. The team was housed in the Webster Hall Hotel. Coach Sutherland had to replace three starters, but he had five senior lettermen, nineteen juniors (10 of whom earned letters) and more than twenty sophomores vying for positions. His outlook for the season was cautious: "The schedule is tougher than anything we've ever attempted...Then again, the fact that we won't have camp this fall is going to hurt us. That camp has meant a great deal to us in the past. The boys ate, slept, played and thought football all day long at Camp Hamilton.This fall we won't have them together as much as we like. But don't forget, we'll show up for all the games."

== Coaching staff ==
1936 Pittsburgh Panthers football staff
Coaching staff: John B. "Jock" Sutherland – head coach; Bill Kern – assistant coach; Charley Bowser – assistant coach; Edward Baker – backfield coach; Ralph Daugherty – center coach; Mike Nicksick – backfield coach; Edward Hirshberg – end coach; Walter Milligan– freshman coach	Support staff: Dr. H. A. Ralph Shanor – team physician; Dr. George (Bud) Moore – team trainer; Percy S. Browne – custodian of equipment; W. D. Harrison - director of athletics; James Hagan – graduate manager of athletics; Frank Carver – publicity director; William Blair – co-varsity student manager; John Bailey– co-varsity student manager

== Roster ==
1936 Pittsburgh Panthers football roster
Player	Position	Games	Height	Weight	Class	Prep School	Hometown
Bill Glassford*	guard	8	5' 9"	192	1937	Lancaster H. S.	Lancaster, Ohio
Tony Matisi*	tackle	10	6'	210	1938	Endicott H. S.	Endicott, NY
Dante Dalle Tezze*	guard	10	5' 11"	188	1938	Jeannette H. S.	Jeannette, PA
George Delich*	tackle	7	6'	195	1938	Froebel H.S.	Gary, IN
Henry Adams*	center	10	6'1"	185	1938	California H. S.	California, PA
Ave Daniell*	tackle	10	6'1"	198	1937	Mt. Lebanon H. S.	Mt. Lebanon, PA
Walter Raskowski*	guard	9	5' 11"	190	1939	New Castle H. S.	New Castle, PA
Albin Lezouski*	guard	9	6'	185	1939	Mahanoy City H. S.	Mahanoy City, PA
Robert LaRue*	halfback	9	5' 9"	163	1937	Wyoming Seminary	Greensburg, PA
Donald Hensley*	center	9	6' 1"	194	1938	Huntington H. S.	Huntington, WV
Frank Souchak*	end	9	6'	192	1938	Berwick H. S.	Berwick., PA
Frank Patrick*	fullback	10	6'	193	1938	Roosevelt H. S.	East Chicago, IN
Marshall Goldberg*	halfback	10	6'	175	1939	Elkins H. S.	Elkins, WVA
John Urban	halfback	7	5' 11"	160	1938	Larksville H. S.	Larksville, PA
Leo Malarkey*	halfback	5	5' 10"	160	1937	McDonald H. S.	McDonald, PA
Arnold Greene*	quarterback	9	6' 1"	210	1937	Huntingdon H. S.	Huntingdon, PA
John Michelosen*	quarterback	9	6'	187	1938	Ambridge H. S.	Ambridge, PA
William Stapulis*	halfback	7	5' 10"	175	1938	California H. S.	California, PA
Fabian Hoffman*	end	9	6'	170	1939	Central Catholic H. S.	Pittsburgh, PA
Robert Dannies	center	5	5' 11"	190	1939	Westmont H. S.	Wauwatosa, WI
Robert McClure*	quarterback	6	5' 8"	180	1937	Greenville H. S.	Greenville, PA
John Chickerneo*	quarterback	9	6'	195	1939	Warren H. S.	Warren, OH
Bill Daddio*	end	10	5' 11"	175	1939	Meadville H. S.	Meadville, PA
John Dougert*	fullback	5	5' 8"	170	1937	Shenandoah H. S.	Shenandoah, PA
John Wood*	halfback	9	5' 10"	165	1937	Magrotta H. S.	New Martinsville, WV
Charles Fleming*	end	6	5' 8"	160	1939	New Castle H. S.	New Castle, PA
Elmer Merkovsky*	tackle	9	6' 1"	205	1939	Scott H. S.	North Braddock. PA
Harold Stebbins*	halfback	9	6' 1"	185	1939	Williamsport H. S.	Williamsport, PA
Steve Petro*	guard	7	5' 10"	185	1939	Johnstown H. S.	Johnstown, PA
Luther Richards	guard	4	5' 10"	185	1938	Kingston H. S.	Kingston, PA
Cleon Linderman	center	4	6'	175	1937	Allegheny H. S.	Allegheny, NY
George Yocos	guard	2	5' 9"	175	1938	Monessen H. S.	Monessen, PA
Ben Asavitch	tackle	3	6' 2"	185	1939	Wilkes-Barre Memorial H. S.	Wilkes-Barre, PA
Walter Miller	end	3	6'	187	1938	Phillipsburg H. S.	Phillipsburg, NJ
Charles Shea	halfback	3	5' 10"	155	1939		Pittsburgh, PA
Clement Cambal	fullback	1	5' 10"	175	1939	Springdale H. S.	Springdale, PA
Howard Jackman	quarterback	3		150	1939	Peabody H. S.	Pittsburgh, PA
Joseph Morrow	end	2	5' 10"	170	1938	Mars H. S.	Mars, PA
George Musulin	tackle	3	5' 11"	220	1938	Mt. Lebanon H.S.	Mt. Lebanon, PA
Albert Walton	guard	3	6'	180	1937	Beaver Falls H. S.	Beaver Falls, PA
Willard Curry	center	2	5' 11"	170	1939		East McKeesport, PA
Ted Schmitt	tackle	4	6'	205	1938	Carrick H. S.	Carrick, PA
Robert Daufenbach	tackle	2	6' 1"	175	1938		Pittsburgh, PA
Alfred Berger	tackle	3	6'	185	1939	Allegheny H. S.	Pittsburgh, PA
Peter Mensky	halfback	1		165	1939		Jermyn, PA
James Kosinski	quarterback	1	5' 9"	155	1939	Sheffield H. S.	Pittsburgh, PA
Benjamin Kopec	end	3		165	1939	Academy H. S.	Erie, PA
Frank Hovanec	end	1	5' 11"	170	1938	Ambridge H. S.	Ambridge, PA
Joseph Troglione	halfback	4	5' 9"	160	1937	Wilkinsburg H. S.	Wilkinsburg, PA
Bernard McNish	end	3	5' 11"	180	1937	Elizabeth H. S.	Elizabeth, PA
Paul Shaw	end	0	5' 11"	184	1938	Bradford H. S.	Bradford, PA
Ira Paul	fullback	0		185	1939	Johnstown H. S.	Johnstown, PA
Edward Spotovich	end	4		185	1938	South H. S.	Pittsburgh, PA
James Scarfpin	guard	1	5' 10"	195	1937	Altoona H. S.	Martins Ferry, OH
John Bailey*	co-varsity student manager				1937	Ford City, H. S.	Ford City, PA
William Blair*	co-varsity student manager				1937	Mt. Lebanon H. S.	Mt. Lebanon, PA
* Letterman

== Game summaries ==
=== Ohio Wesleyan ===
Week 1: Ohio Wesleyan at Pitt

Team	1	2	3	4	Total
Ohio Wesleyan	0	0	0	0	0
• Pitt	14	20	6	13	53

- Date: September 26, 1936
- Location: Pitt Stadium
  Pittsburgh, PA
- Game start: 2:00 p.m.
- Game attendance: 19,000
- Game weather: warm sunshine
- Referee: H. W. Emswiler (Dennison)

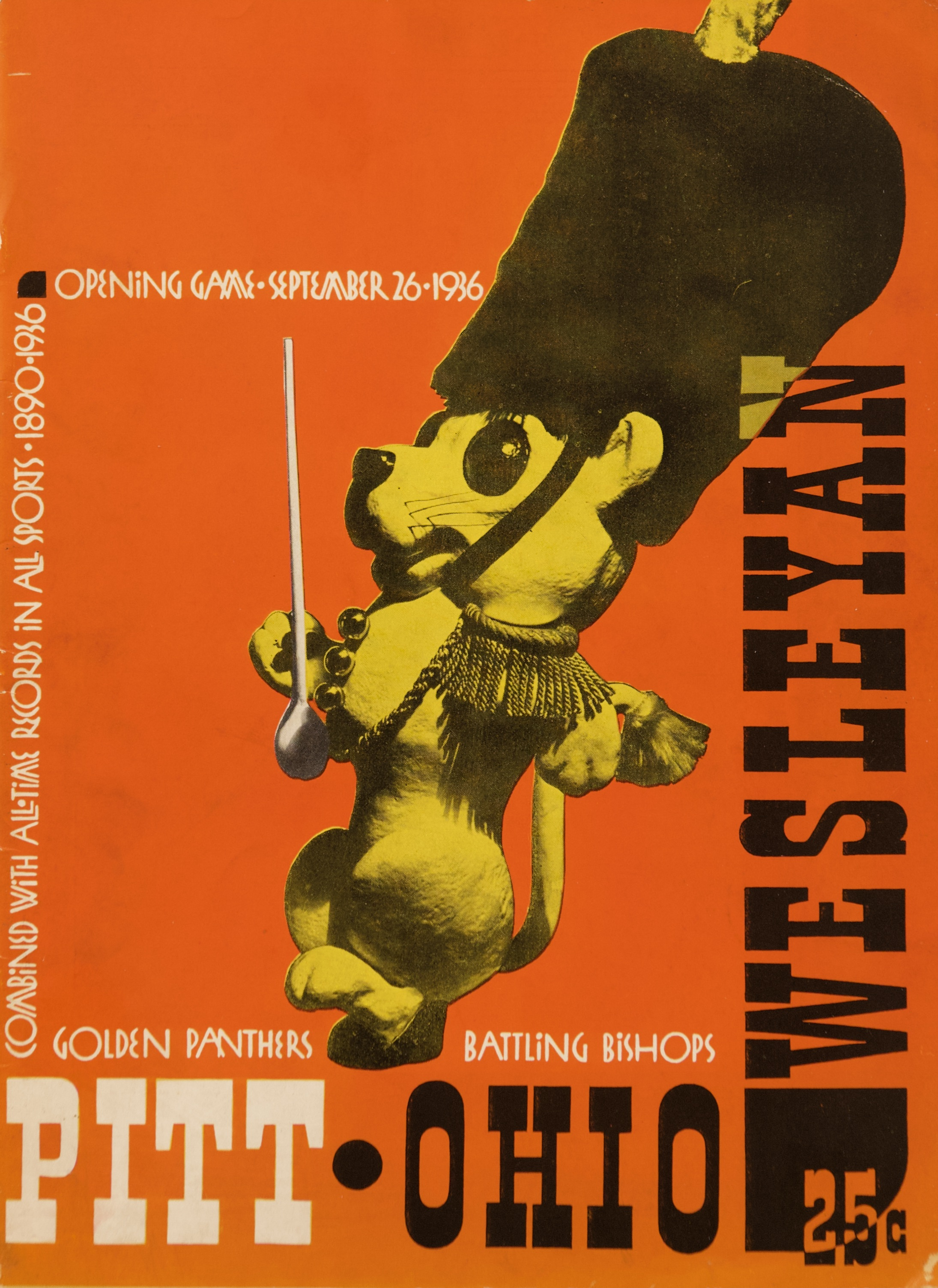
Program for September 26 game versus Ohio Wesleyan

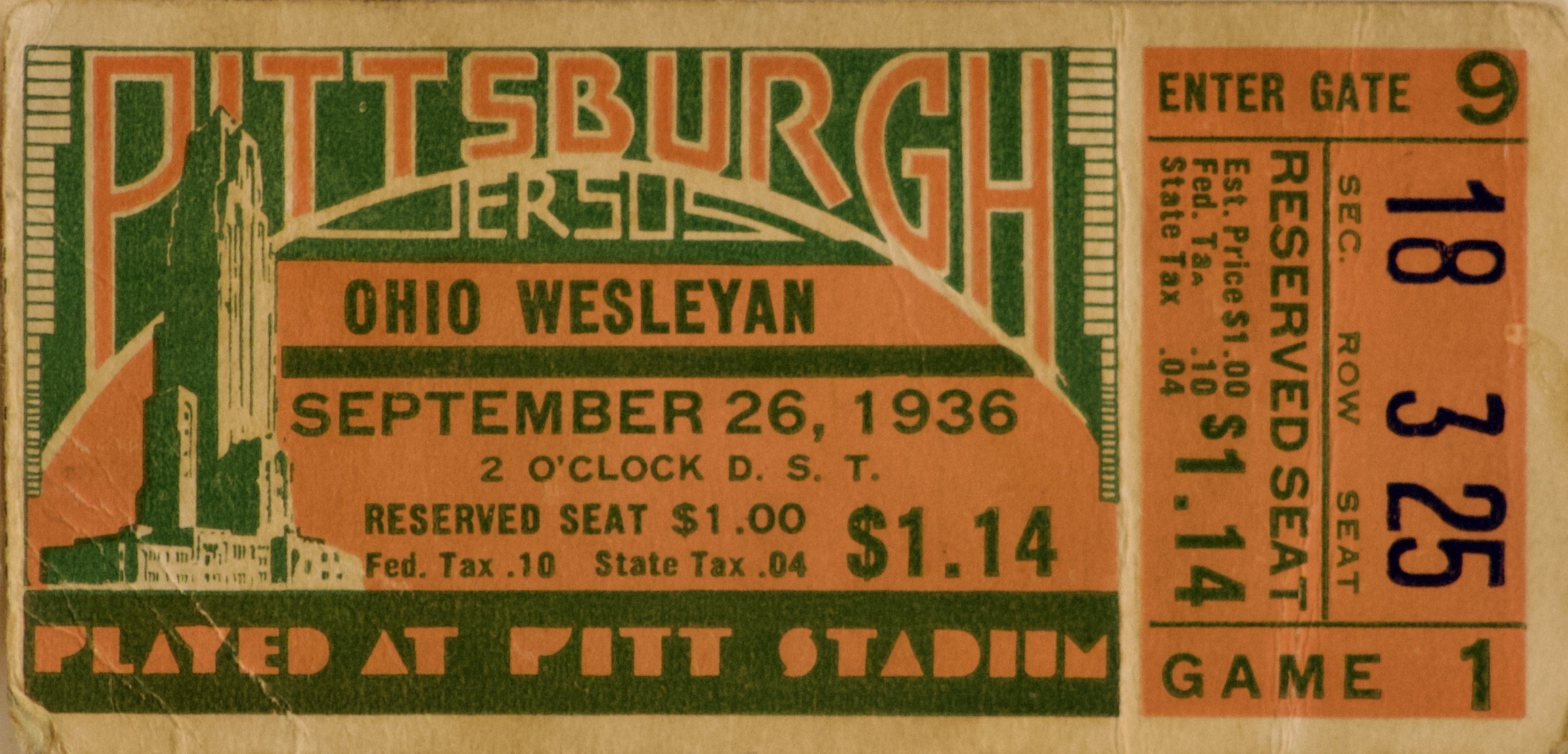
Ticket stub for September 26 game versus Ohio Wesleyan

Pitt and the Ohio Wesleyan Battling Bishops from Delaware, Ohio met on the gridiron for the first time on September 26. Ohio Wesleyan was coached by George E. Gauthier, former Michigan Agricultural College quarterback, who was in his fifteenth year at the helm of the Bishops. The Bishops were coming off a 5–3–1 season and a second place finish in the Buckeye Athletic Association. The Pitt News reported: "Ohio Wesleyan will send to Pittsburgh an ideal team for an opening day game as the Battling Bishops are just rugged enough to test the Pitt strength and put the Panther machine into gear for the journey ahead."

After 18 days of practice, the veteran-laden Panther squad was healthy and still competing for starting positions. For the opener Sutherland started two sophomores – halfback, Marshall Goldberg and end, Bill Daddio; seven juniors – tackles, Tony Matisi and George Delich, center, Don Hensley, guard, Dante Dalle Tezze, end, Frank Souchak, quarterback, John Michelosen and fullback, Bill Stapulis; and two seniors – guard, Bill Glassford and halfback Bobby LaRue.

On game day, the Pittsburgh Post-Gazette reported: "Children under 12 years of age will be admitted to the Pitt-Ohio Wesleyan game today at Pitt Stadium for 25 ents[sic]. They will use Gate 14 and tickets will be sold from the booth directly opposite this entrance."

A large opening day crowd of 19,000 saw the Panthers score 8 touchdowns and rout the Bishops 53 to 0. Forty-eight Panthers received some playing time. The Panther assault was led by halfbacks Marshall Goldberg and John Wood. Sophomore halfback Goldberg tallied two touchdowns in the first period and gained 208 yards on 15 carries in one half of play. Wood, a senior, scored two touchdowns in the second quarter. Harold Stebbins, Bobby LaRue, Frank Patrick and Leo Malarkey each added one touchdown in the second half. The Panther offense gained 601 yards and earned 18 first downs, while the defense gave up 44 yards and 2 first downs to the Bishops. After 14 straight winning seasons, Ohio Wesleyan finished their schedule with a 1–6–2 record.

Substitutes appearing in the game for the Panthers were Charles Fleming, Frank Hovanec, Ben Kopec, Elmer Merkovsky, Ben Asavitch, Alfred Berger, Walter Raskowski, Robert Dannies, Henry Adams, Cleon Linderman, Albin Lezouski, Luther Richards, Averill Daniell, Ted Schmidt, Fabian Hoffman, Walter Miller, Arnold Greene, John Chickerneo, Howard Jackman, Leo Malarkey, John Urban, Joseph Troglione, Charles Shea, Harold Stebbins, John Wood, Frank Patrick, John Dougert, Robert McClure, Edward Spotovich, Steve Petro, George Yocos, James Scarfpin, Peter Mensky, Clement Cambal, George Musulin, Joe Morrow and Bernard McNish.

Scoring summary

Quarter	Time	Drive			Team	Scoring information	Score	
Quarter	Time	Plays	Yards	TOP	Team	Scoring information	Ohio Wesleyan	Pittsburgh
1		4	66		Pittsburgh	Marshall Goldberg 2-yard touchdown run, Frank Souchak kick good	0	7
1		1	76		Pittsburgh	Goldberg 76-yard touchdown run, Souchak kick good	0	14
2		4	58		Pittsburgh	Harold Stebbins 46-yard touchdown run, Frank Patrick kick good	0	21
2		1	53		Pittsburgh	John Wood 53-yard touchdown run, Charles Fleming kick good	0	28
2		4	36		Pittsburgh	Wood 36-yard touchdown reception from Joseph Troglione, Averell Daniell kick no good	0	34
3		7	66		Pittsburgh	Bobby LaRue 6-yard touchdown run, Souchak kick no good	0	40
4		7	42		Pittsburgh	Patrick 3-yard touchdown run, Patrick kick no good	0	46
4		4	53		Pittsburgh	Leo Malarkey 1-yard touchdown run, Fleming kick good	0	53
"TOP" = time of possession. For other American football terms, see Glossary of American football.							0	53

=== West Virginia ===
Week 2: West Virginia at Pitt

Team	1	2	3	4	Total
West Virginia	0	0	0	0	0
• Pitt	0	14	20	0	34

- Date: October 3, 1936
- Location: Pitt Stadium
  Pittsburgh, PA
- Game start: 2:00 p.m.
- Game attendance: 21,000
- Game weather: cloudy and warm
- Referee: Russell Goodwin (Washington & Jefferson)

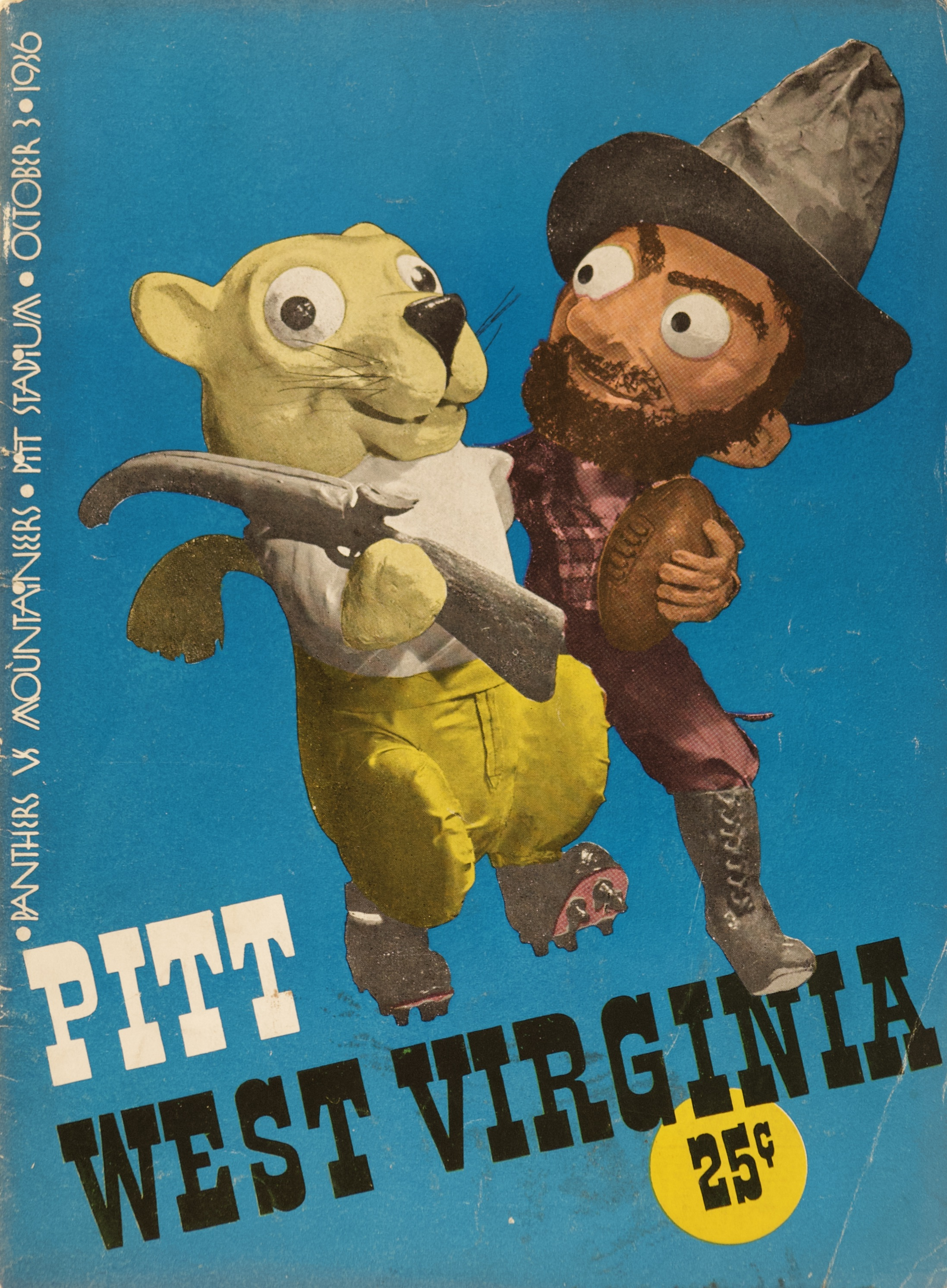
Program for October 3 game versus West Virginia

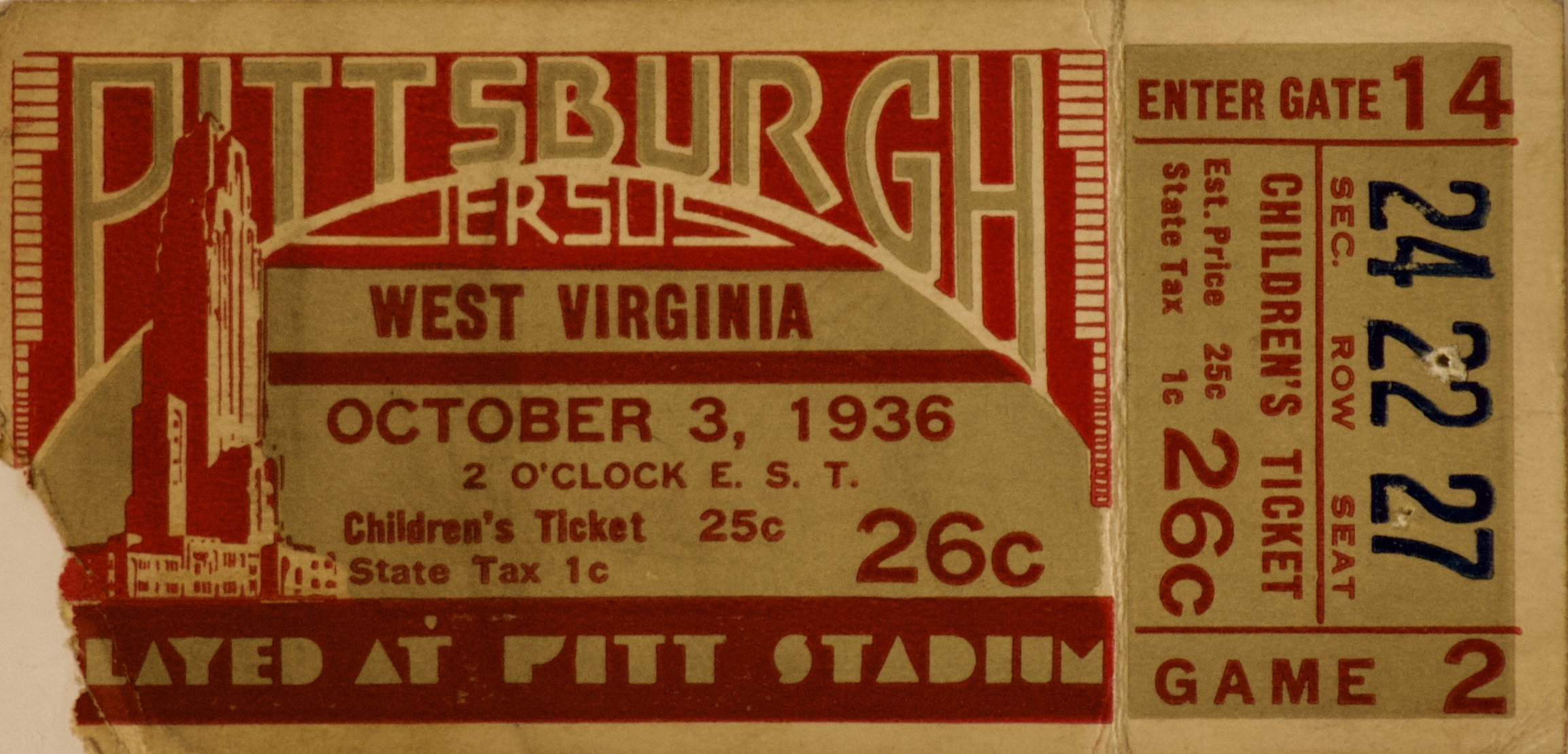
Ticket stub for October 3 game versus West Virginia

On October 3, Charles "Trusty" Talman brought his West Virginia Mountaineers to Pitt Stadium for the annual gridiron duel with the Panthers. West Virginia was 2–0 on the season, besting both Waynesburg (7–0) at home and Cincinnati(40–0) on the road. Coach Talman was in his third year and had an 11–8–2 record. After last year's Pitt victory, the all-time series, dating back to 1895, stood at 22–8–1 in favor of Pittsburgh.

Coach Talman's squad hoped their passing game would give Pitt trouble. Mountaineer halfback Kelly Moran and end Babe Barna connected for three touchdown passes in the Cincinnati game. However, West Virginia was inexperienced, with five sophomores in the starting lineup.

Coach Sutherland was happy since four veteran starters from 1935 regained their positions with a good week of practice – Henry Adams at center, Arnold Greene at quarterback, Averell Daniell at tackle and Frank Patrick at fullback. Jock wrote in his weekly article for The Pittsburgh Press: "West Virginia comes to Pittsburgh, and we expect the usual game with the Mountaineers. Trusty Tallman's outfit battles every inch of the way and, should his passing attack click, is likely to cause us several headaches. We should prevail by a comfortable margin, however."

The Panthers extended their winning streak to eight straight games against the Mountaineers with a 34–0 victory. Third-string running back Leo Malarkey scored three touchdowns to lead the offense. The first and fourth quarters were scoreless. Early in the second period the Panther offense gained possession on their 41-yard line. Seven plays later Malarkey bulled into the end zone from the one. Frank Patrick converted the point after and Pitt led 7–0. The Panthers regained possession and halfback Bobby LaRue threw a 46-yard touchdown pass to Fabian Hoffman. Patrick's placement was good and Pitt led 14–0 at halftime. On Pitt's first possession of the third quarter, Malarkey took a handoff and raced 80 yards for his second touchdown. The extra point was missed. Four plays later Pitt tackle, Averell Daniell, blocked a Mountaineer pass attempt into the arms of teammate Tony Matisi, who rambled unmolested 33 yards to the end zone. Daniell kicked the point after and Pitt led 27–0. The Panther defense held and forced a punt. On first down "Malarkey pulled his 46-yard gallop for the fifth and last tally." Charles Fleming added the placement to make the final 34 to 0.

The Mountaineers finished the season with a 6–4 record. Coach Tallman resigned on June 24, 1937 and became the superintendent of the West Virginia State Police.

The Pitt starting lineup for the game against West Virginia was Bill Daddio (left end), Tony Matisi (left tackle), Bill Glassford (left guard), Henry Adams (center), Dante Dalle Tezze (right guard), Averell Daniell (right tackle), Fabian Hoffman (right end), Arnold Greene (quarterback), Marshall Goldberg (left halfback), Bobby LaRue (right halfback) and Frank Patrick (fullback). Substitutes appearing in the game for Pitt were George Delich, Walter Raskowski, Albin Lezouski, Don Hensley, Leo Malarkey, John Michelosen, William Stapulis, Robert McClure, John Chickerneo, John Dougert, Charles Fleming, Elmer Merkovsky, Luther Richards, Ben Asavitch, Walter Miller, Clement Cambal, Howard Jackman, Willard Curry, Ted Schmidt, Harold Stebbins, Robert Daufenbach, Ben Kopec, Joseph Troglione, Bernard McNish, Joe Morrow, George Musulin, Al Berger, Steve Petro, Albert Walton, Robert Dannies, Cleon Linderman, James Kosinski and Charles Shea.

Scoring summary

Quarter	Time	Drive			Team	Scoring information	Score	
Quarter	Time	Plays	Yards	TOP	Team	Scoring information	West Virginia	Pittsburgh
2		7	59		Pittsburgh	Leo Malarkey 1-yard touchdown run, Frank Patrick kick good	0	7
2		6	69		Pittsburgh	Fabian Hoffman 48-yard touchdown reception from Bobby LaRue, Frank Patrick kick good	0	14
3		1	80		Pittsburgh	Malarkey 80-yard touchdown run, Frank Patrick kick no good	0	20
3		1	33		Pittsburgh	Interception returned 33 yards for touchdown by Tony Matisi, Averell Daniell kick good	0	27
3		1	46		Pittsburgh	Leo Malarkey 46-yard touchdown run, Charles Fleming kick good	0	34
"TOP" = time of possession. For other American football terms, see Glossary of American football.							0	34

=== At Ohio State ===
Week 3: Pitt at Ohio State

Team	1	2	3	4	Total
• Pitt	0	0	0	6	6
Ohio State	0	0	0	0	0

- Date: October 10, 1936
- Location: Ohio Stadium
  Columbus, OH
- Game start: 2:00 p.m.
- Game attendance: 71,714
- Game weather: muddy and overcast
- Referee: Frank Lane (Detroit)

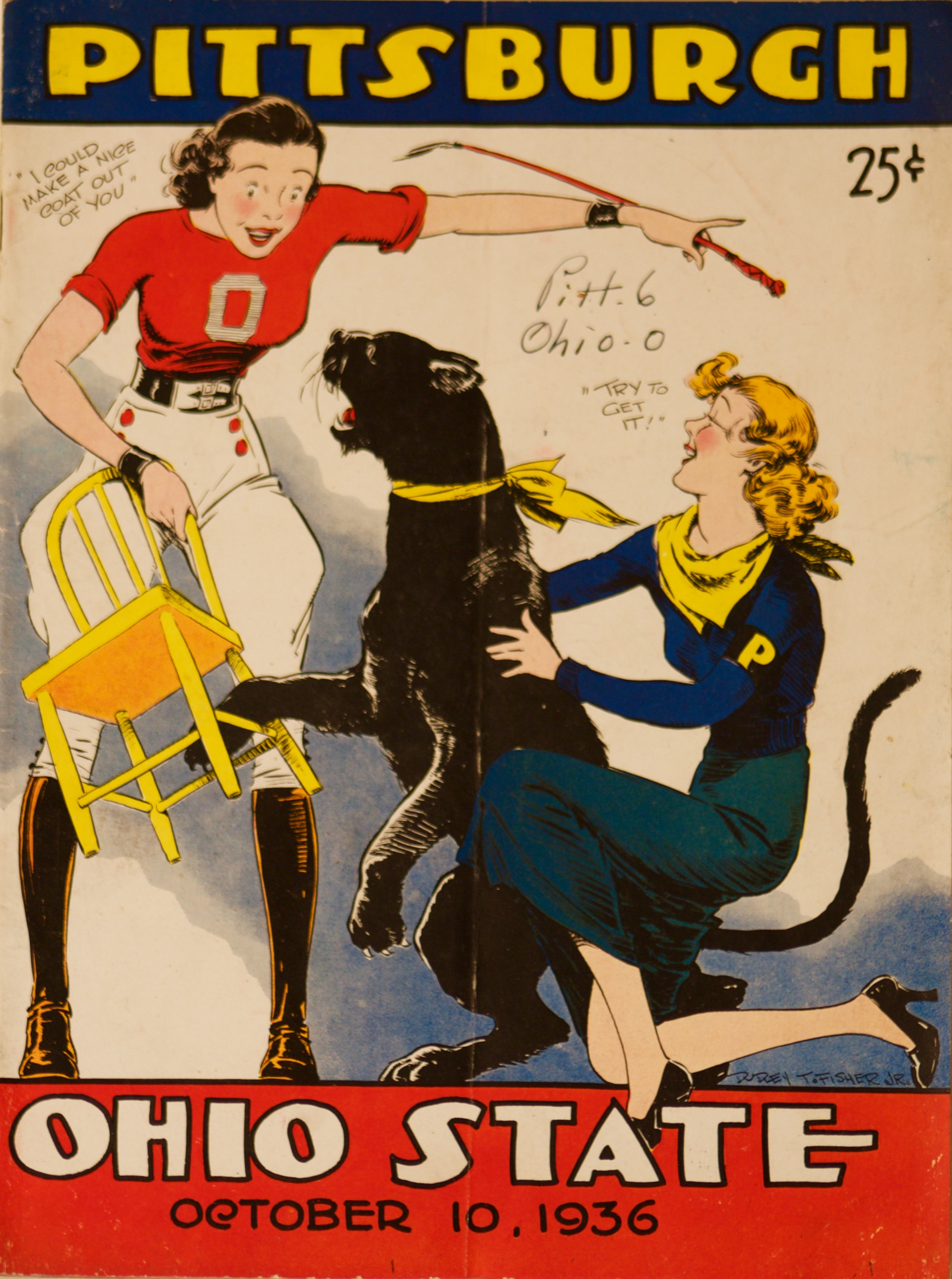
Program for October 10 game versus Ohio State

The first road trip was to Columbus, Ohio to play third-year coach Francis Schmidt's Ohio State Buckeyes. This was the fourth meeting between the schools and the series record stood at 1–1–1. Coach Schmidt's Buckeyes earned a 14–2 record in his first two years, only losing to Illinois (14–13) in 1934 and Notre Dame (18–13) in 1935. The Buckeyes crushed NYU (60–0) in their season opener. The left side of the Buckeye line was anchored by Associated Press second team All-Americans - tackle Charley Hamrick and end Merle Wendt. The right tackle, Peter Gales, was injured in the NYU game and his replacement, Alex Schoenbaum, had a severe cold so Charles Ream started the game.

The Panthers boarded the train to Columbus on Friday morning and ate lunch en route. Upon arrival, they proceeded to Ohio Stadium for practice, where they found a flooded field. Coach Sutherland said: "his team had but one set of uniforms and shoes along, and that he could not risk getting them wet." Sutherland reported in Saturday's Pittsburgh Press: "We have a team of considerable strength. I have never seen better spirit on a squad. ..The fact that Ohio is one of the leading elevens in the country furnishes us with an incentive to win. We will give our best. If that isn't good enough, we will be more than glad to salute the winner."

The unbeaten and unscored upon Pitt Panthers kept their record intact with a 6–0 victory over the Ohio State Buckeyes that was not as close as the score would indicate. The Panther offense netted 243 total yards and 11 first downs to 75 yards and 5 first downs for the Buckeyes. The 71,714 fans, including Republican presidential nominee Alf M. Landon, were treated to a defensive battle that was waged for more than three scoreless quarters. On their opening possession the Panthers drove the ball to the State 4-yard line, and lost the ball on downs. The Buckeyes' offense was never able to penetrate closer than the Pitt 43-yard line. With six minutes left on the clock, Panther halfback Harold Stebbins broke loose between right guard and tackle, picked up some interference and raced 35 yards for the only points of the game. The game ended with Pitt in possession on the State 4-yard line.

Coach Schmidt told The Cincinnati Enquirer: "There were two good teams playing for a break, and Pitt got it. But, aside from that, Pitt is the most powerful team I have ever seen."

The Cincinnati Enquirer noted that the 130-member Pitt band "took the play" away from the Ohio State band. The Panthers brought the largest visiting band ever to attend a game in Columbus and did themselves proud.

The Pitt starting lineup for the Ohio State game was Bill Daddio (left end), Tony Matisi (left tackle), Bill Glassford (left guard), Henry Adams (center), Dante Dalle Tezze (right guard), Averell Daniell (right tackle), Frank Souchak (right tackle), John Michelosen (quarterback), Marshall Goldberg (left halfback), Bobby LaRue (right halfback) and Frank Patrick (fullback). Substitutes appearing in the game for Pitt were Fabian Hoffman, George Delich, Elmer Merkovsky, Walter Raskowski, Albin Lezouski, Don Hensley, Arnold Greene, Harold Stebbins, Leo Malarkey, John Chickerneo, and William Stapulis.

Scoring summary

Quarter	Time	Drive			Team	Scoring information	Score	
Quarter	Time	Plays	Yards	TOP	Team	Scoring information	Pittsburgh	Ohio State
4		2	37		Pittsburgh	Harold Stebbins 35-yard touchdown run, Frank Patrick kick no good	6	0
"TOP" = time of possession. For other American football terms, see Glossary of American football.							6	0

=== Duquesne ===
Week 4: Duquesne at Pitt

Team	1	2	3	4	Total
• Duquesne	0	7	0	0	7
Pitt	0	0	0	0	0

- Date: October 17, 1936
- Location: Pitt Stadium
  Pittsburgh, PA
- Game start: 2:00 p.m.
- Game attendance: 20,000
- Game weather: rain
- Referee: E. A. Geiges (Temple)

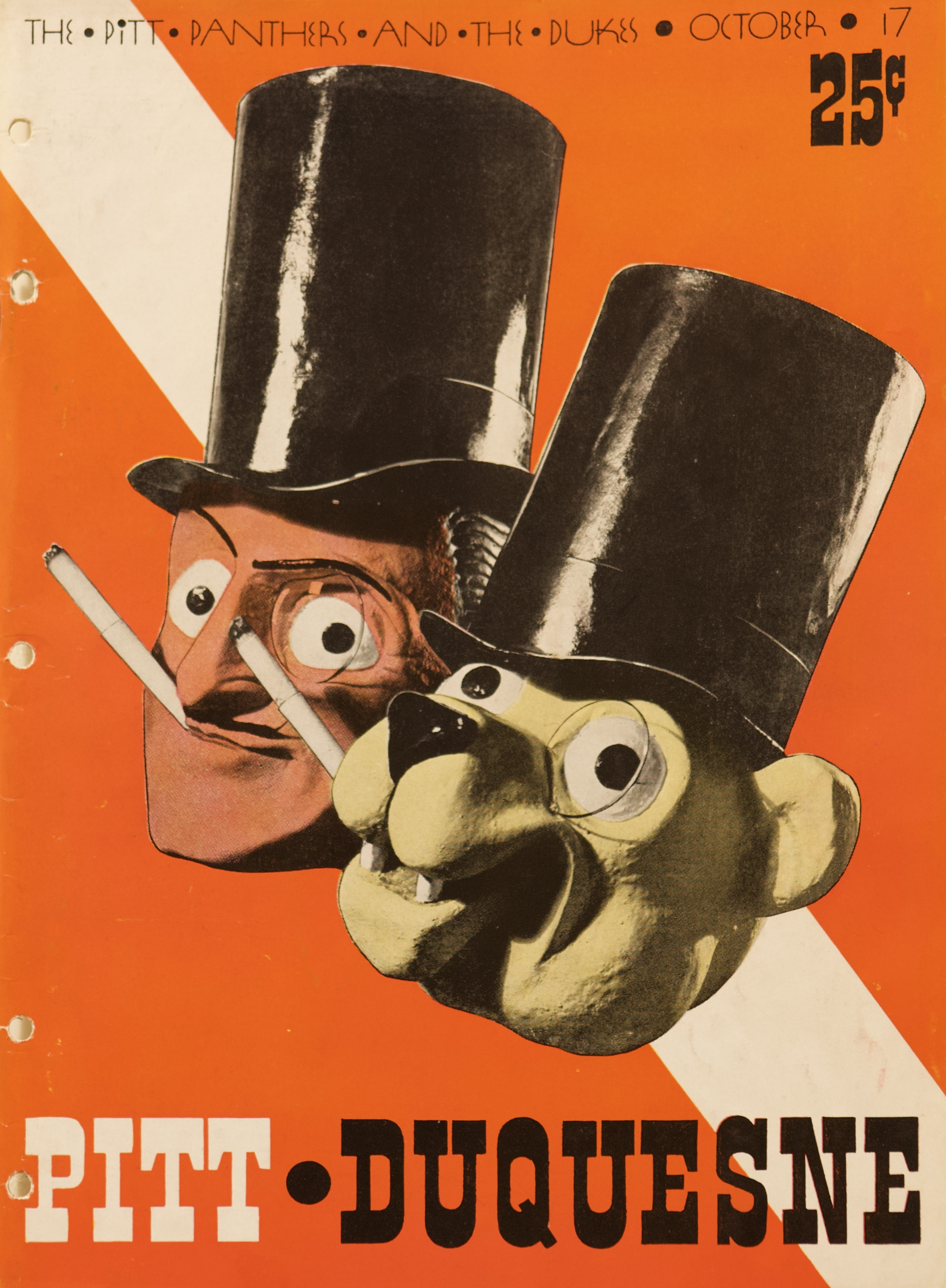
Program for October 17 game versus Duquesne

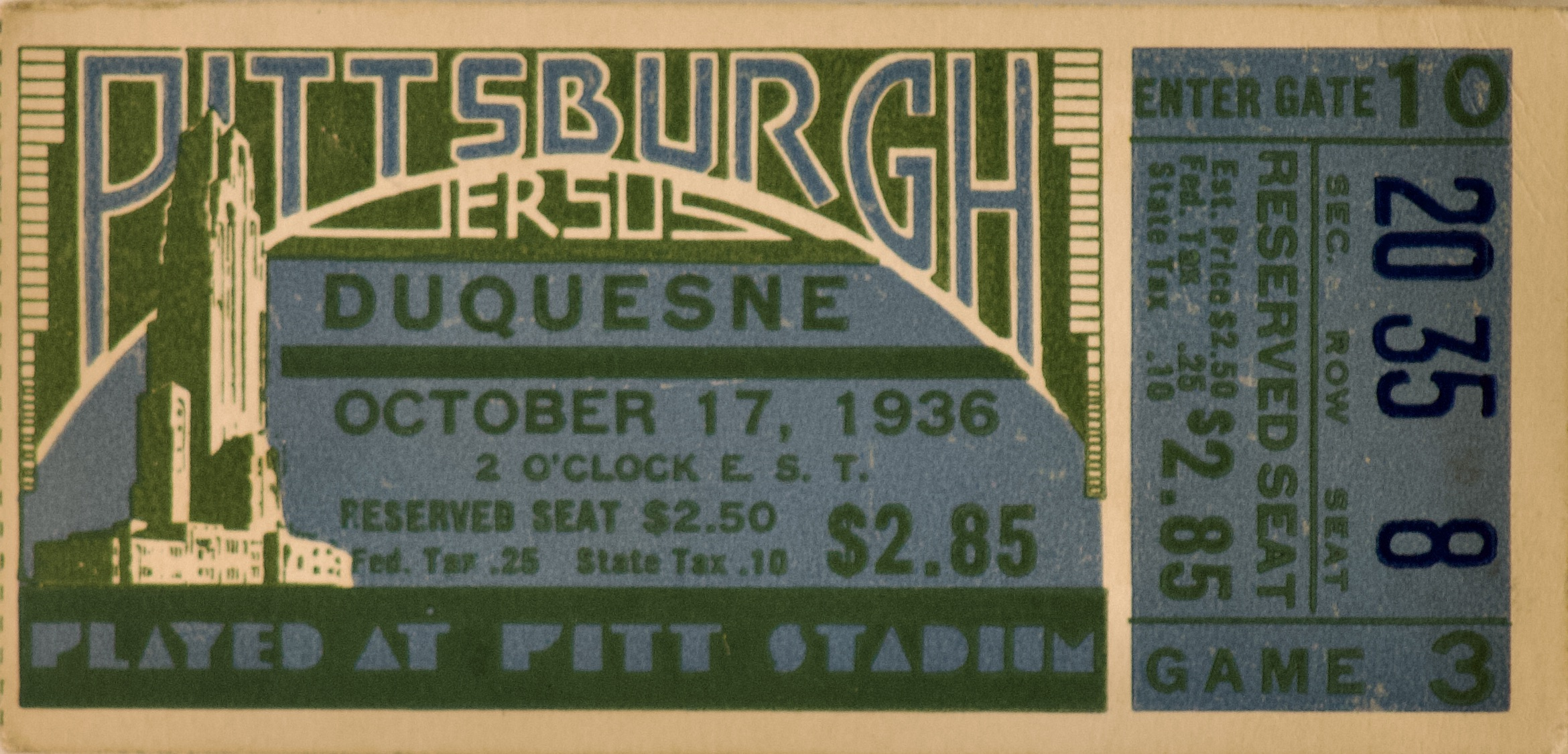
Ticket stub for October 17 game versus Duquesne

On October 17, the Panthers returned home to face city rival Duquesne University. Pitt led the series 3–0 and had not surrendered a point to the Dukes in the three victories. The Dukes were led by first-year coach John "Clipper" Smith, who was an All-American guard at Notre Dame in 1927. The Dukes came into the game with a 3–0 record, having beaten Waynesburg (14–0), Rice (14–0) and Geneva (33–0). All-American center, Mike Basrak, anchored the Dukes line.

The Panthers were healthy, but Sutherland replaced fullback Frank Patrick with William Stapulis in the starting lineup. Sutherland was worried: "Pittsburgh has come back after a grueling battle with Ohio State and bump into a local rival, Duquesne. The Dukes had an easy game last week – just the right sort of tune-up. They will be shooting for this one. It is the game on their schedule with capital letters."

For the first time in 8 seasons, the Panthers lost to an eastern team, as the Duquesne Dukes pulled off the major upset 7 to 0. This was the first score against Pitt in the 1936 season and the first score given up to Duquesne in the series. 20,000 fans braved the rainy weather and sat through a defensive struggle and punting duel. The Panthers gained 247 net yards and earned 11 first downs. The Pitt defense held Duquesne to 192 net yards and 3 first downs, but in the second quarter, Duquesne halfback George Matsik replaced injured Beto Vairo and raced 72 yards unimpeded for a touchdown. Boyd Brumbaugh converted the extra point to complete the scoring. In the opening quarter, the Panthers advanced the ball to the Dukes 13-yard line but lost the ball on downs. After the Dukes went ahead, Pitt end Fabian Hoffman recovered a fumbled punt on the Duquesne 28-yard line. The Panthers rushed the ball to the 6-yard line, but Leo Malarkey fumbled and Duquesne recovered on their 2-yard line. In the second half, the Panthers had one decent drive, as they advanced the ball to the Dukes 29-yard line. On the next play, Bobby LaRue's pass was intercepted by Frank Zoppetti at the 21-yard line and Pitt's National Championship hopes faded.

Coach Sutherland mused: "I tried to tell those boys what to expect. They wouldn't take me seriously though. Duquesne looked better than I've seen them play before. They deserved to win, no doubt about that."

Duquesne lost their next 2 games to West Virginia Wesleyan (2–0) and Detroit Mercy (14–7), but rebounded with three straight victories to finish the regular season 8–2. They were invited to the Orange Bowl and beat Mississippi State 13–12.

The Pitt starting lineup for the game against Duquesne was Bill Daddio (left end), Tony Matisi (left tackle), Bill Glassford (left guard), Henry Adams (center), Dante Dalle Tezze (right guard), Averell Daniell (right tackle), Frank Souchak (right end), John Michelosen (quarterback), Marshall Goldberg (left halfback), Bobby LaRue (right halfback) and William Stapulis (fullback). Substitutes appearing in the game for Pitt were Bernard McNish, Elmer Merchovsky, Walter Raskowski, Don Hensley, Albin Lezouski, Fabian Hoffman, Arnold Greene, John Chickerneo, Robert McClure, Harold Stebbins, John Wood, John Urban, Leo Malarkey and Frank Patrick.

Scoring summary

Quarter	Time	Drive			Team	Scoring information	Score	
Quarter	Time	Plays	Yards	TOP	Team	Scoring information	Duquesne	Pittsburgh
2		3	78		Duquesne	George Matsik 72-yard touchdown run, Boyd Brumbaugh kick good	7	0
"TOP" = time of possession. For other American football terms, see Glossary of American football.							7	0

=== Notre Dame ===
Week 5: Notre Dame at Pitt

Team	1	2	3	4	Total
Notre Dame	0	0	0	0	0
• Pitt	0	7	6	13	26

- Date: October 24, 1936
- Location: Pitt Stadium
  Pittsburgh, PA
- Game start: 2:00 p.m.
- Game attendance: 70,244
- Game weather: clear
- Referee: W. H. Friesell (Princeton)

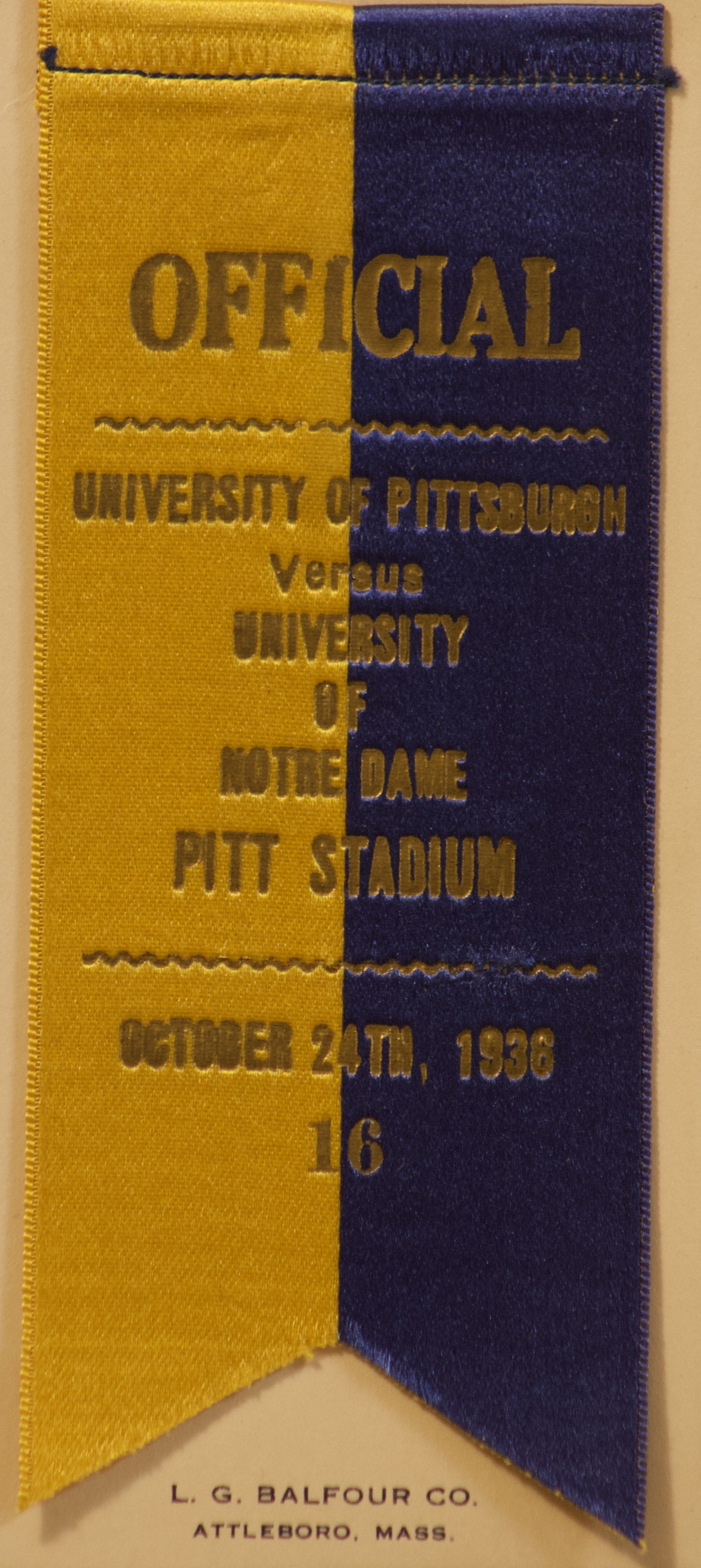
Official's Badge for Notre Dame game

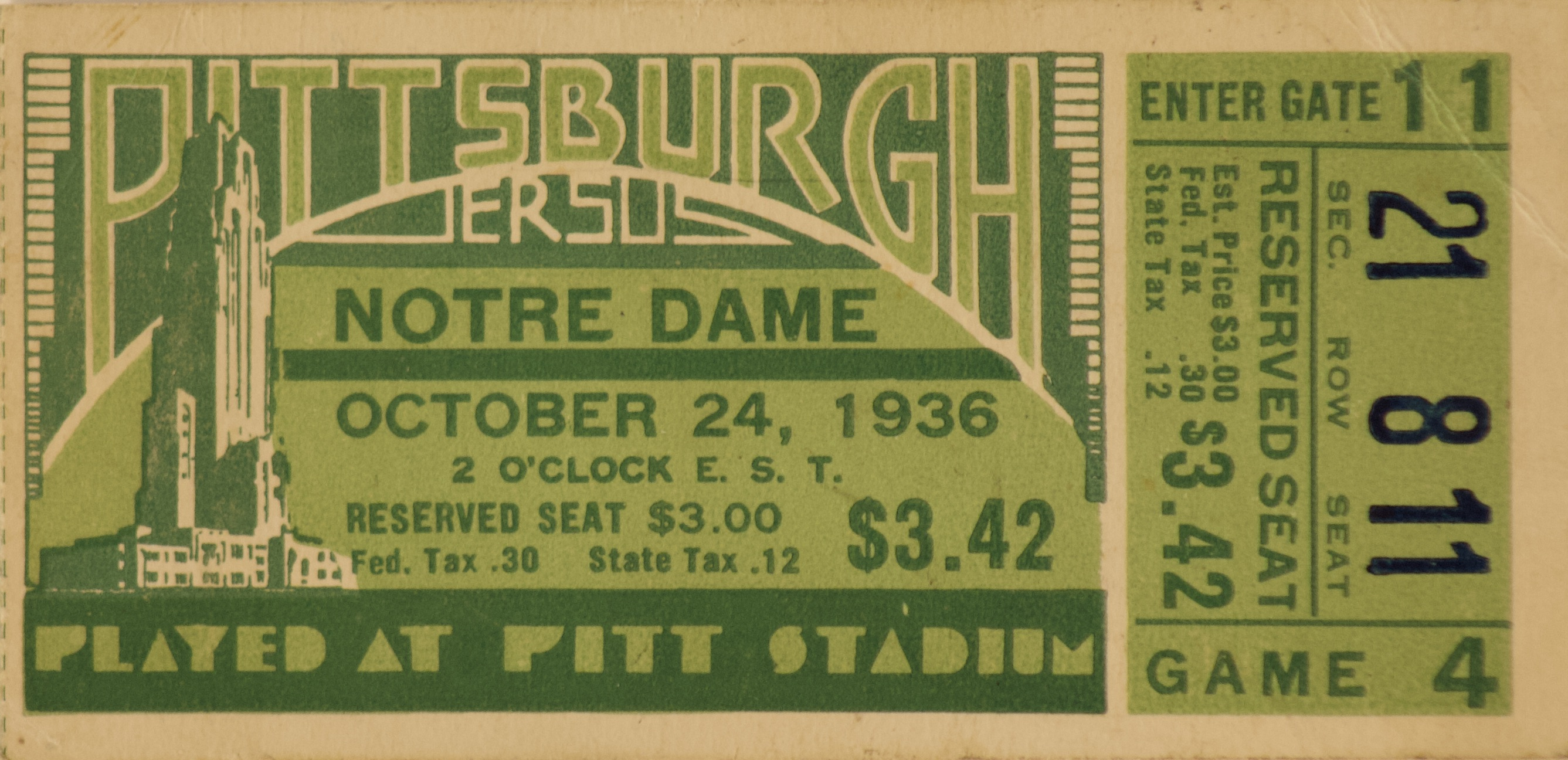
Ticket stub for October 24 game versus Notre Dame

On October 24, the Panthers hosted the undefeated Fighting Irish of Notre Dame. Third-year coach Elmer Layden had his team at 3–0 having beaten Carnegie Tech (21–7), Washington University in St. Louis (14–6) and Wisconsin (27–0). The Irish line was anchored by two All-Americans – guard John Lauter was a first-team UPI choice, and end Joe O'Neill was a second team Central Press Association pick. The Irish led the all-time series with Pitt 5–3–1.

Coach Layden was cautious: "We've been lucky so far this season. Our boys, lacking experience, have made many mistakes. Fortunately, none has cost us heavily and we have been able to win in spite of the errors. Physically, the squad is in good shape."

Sutherland never lost two games in a row as coach of Pitt. His assessment in his weekly column for The Pittsburgh Press was succinct: "I am not sure about just what sort of strength Pittsburgh can muster against Notre Dame. The Irish know our offense pretty well, and we expect to find the going tough."

Enormous ticket requests caused the Pitt officials to add bleacher seating to increase the capacity of the stadium. 70,244 tickets were sold. Fans were warned to beware of bogus tickets being sold by scalpers.

The Panthers atoned for their loss to Duquesne by thrashing Notre Dame 26 to 0. Pitt earned 15 first downs and gained 399 yards, while the Irish were held to 4 first downs and 90 yards. This was Notre Dame's worst defeat since 1925 when they lost to Army 27–0. Notre Dame finished the season with a 6–2-1 record.

After a scoreless opening period, Sutherland made a few substitutions and the Panther offense sustained a 14-play drive that ended with Bill Stapulis scoring on a 2-yard plunge. Frank Souchak added the point after for a 7–0 Pitt lead at halftime. Pitt added a touchdown in the third quarter on a Stapulis to Fabian Hoffman 45-yard touchdown pass. Bill Daddio missed the extra point, but Pitt led 13 to 0 entering the fourth stanza. Notre Dame then penetrated to the Panther 13-yard line, but turned the ball over on downs and the Panthers gained possession on their 20-yard line. The Panther offense covered the 80 yards in nine plays. The highlights of the drive were Bobby LaRue gaining 40 yards on a reverse, and Notre Dame drawing a 25-yard penalty. Marshall Goldberg scored the touchdown and Souchak added the conversion. The Pitt defense was credited with the final tally as John Wood intercepted an errant Irish pass and dashed 45 yards for the touchdown. Souchak missed the placement and Pitt claimed a 26 to 0 victory.

Sutherland praised his team: "That's the best Pitt has been this season. Our fellows played bang-up, heads-up football all the way. I guess we could have licked almost any club out there this afternoon. Personally I am glad of the way the boys acquitted themselves. But Notre Dame is a coming team. They gave us a battle, but Pitt was on for this game."

The Pitt starting lineup for the Notre Dame game was Bill Daddio (left end), Tony Matisis (left tackle), William Glassford (left guard), Henry Adams (center), Dante Dalle Tezze (right guard), Averell Daniell (right tackle), Fabian Hoffman (right end), John Chickerneo (quarterback), Marshall Goldberg (left halfback), Bobby LaRue (right halfback) and Frank Patrick (fullback). Substitutes appearing in the game for Pitt were Charles Fleming, Edward Spotovich, George Delich, Elmer Merkovsky, Walter Raskowski, Steve Petro, Albert Walton, Don Hensley, Robert Dannies, Albin Lezouski, George Musulin, Ted Schmidt, Frank Souchak, John Michelosen, Arnold Greene, Robert McClure, Leo Malarkey, John Urban, Joseph Troglione, Harold Stebbins, John Wood, Bill Stapulis and John Dougert.

Scoring summary

Quarter	Time	Drive			Team	Scoring information	Score	
Quarter	Time	Plays	Yards	TOP	Team	Scoring information	Notre Dame	Pittsburgh
2		14	66		Pittsburgh	Bill Stapulis 2-yard touchdown run, Frank Souchak kick good	0	7
3		4	40		Pittsburgh	Fabian Hoffman 45-yard touchdown reception from Bill Stapulis, Bill Daddio kick no good	0	13
4		9	80		Pittsburgh	Marshall Goldberg 1-yard touchdown run, Frank Souchak kick good	0	20
4		1	45		Pittsburgh	Interception returned 45 yards for touchdown by John Wood, Frank Souchak kick no good	0	26
"TOP" = time of possession. For other American football terms, see Glossary of American football.							0	26

=== At Fordham ===
Week 6: Pitt at Fordham

Team	1	2	3	4	Total
Pitt	0	0	0	0	0
Fordham	0	0	0	0	0

- Date: October 31, 1936
- Location: Polo Grounds
  New York, NY
- Game start: 2:00 p.m.
- Game attendance: 57,000
- Game weather: sunny and warm
- Referee: W. T. Halloran (Providence)

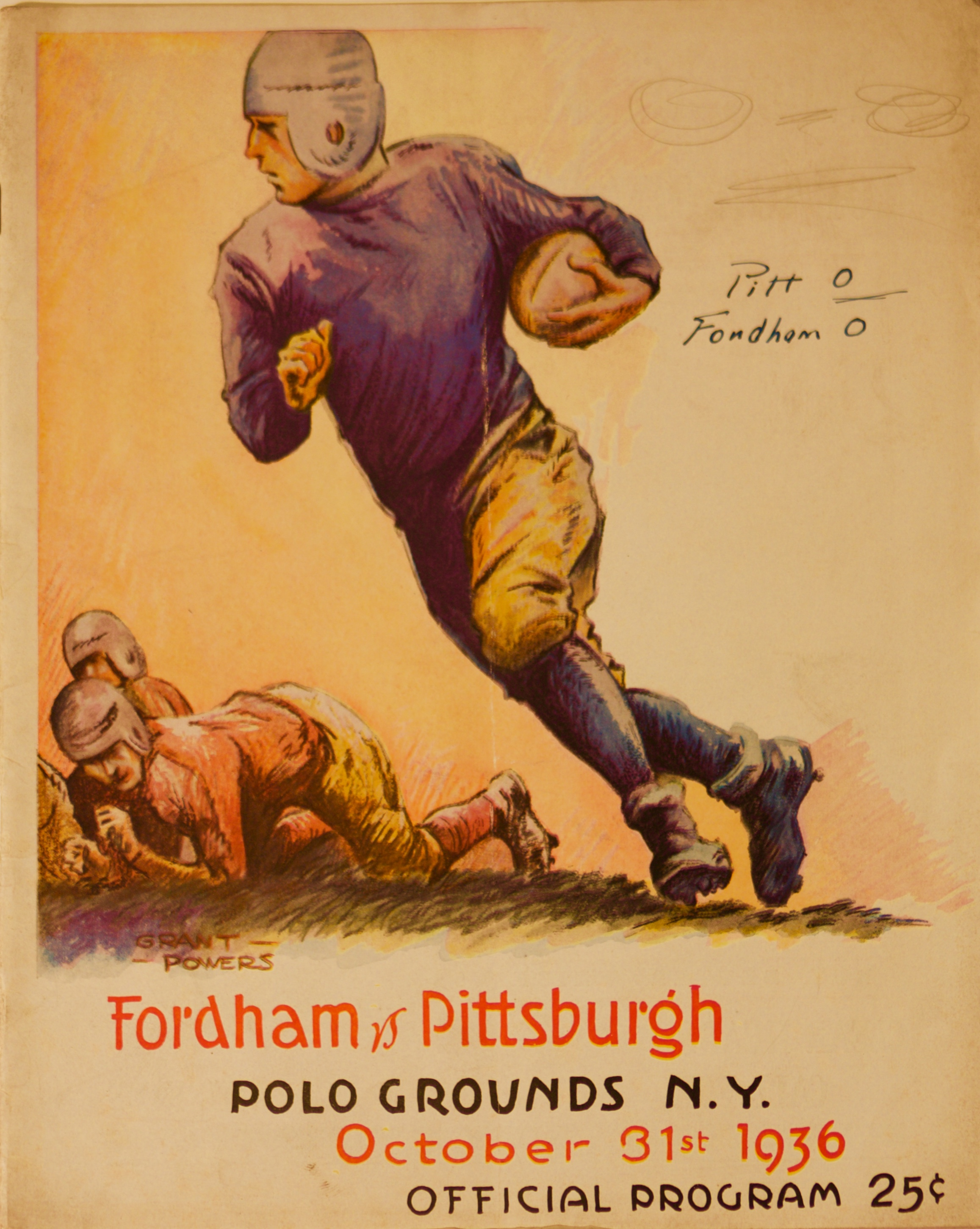
Program for October 31 game versus Fordham

For the second week in a row the Panthers faced a head coach who was a member of the Four Horsemen of Notre Dame. Fourth-year coach Jim Crowley's Rams were undefeated (4–0) in preparation for the Panthers. They walloped Franklin & Marshall 66–7 to open the season. Then they beat SMU (7–0), Waynesburg (20–6) and St. Mary's of Calif. (7–6). Four Rams received All-American mention – center Alex Wojciechowicz, tackle Ed Franco, guard Nathaniel Pierce and halfback Frank Mautte. And their line was labeled the Seven Blocks of Granite by Fordham publicist Timothy Cohane.

Coach Crowley told The Daily News: "I don't know who will win. We have to worry about two things, stopping Pitt and making ourselves go. I know we have a strong line. It is one of the best I have ever seen. My scouts tell me Pitt has a terrific attack, but don't sell us short. We have a good chance to win and we won't throw it away until the game is over. We expect trouble from Goldberg, but we are not overlooking LaRue, Stapulis, Stebbins and the others." Jock Sutherland countered: "We will be meeting the strongest team we have faced this season. Fordham must have a great defense, but I don't think it can be as good as they say. No team is. We are in good condition for the game and will have no alibi if we lose. I think you New Yorkers have over-publicized Marshall Goldberg. He is a great football player, but not superhuman. We have a good offense, but Duquesne stopped us. I am not optimistic."

For the second year in a row, the Panthers and Rams played to a 0–0 tie. The Daily News reported: "Fordham's famed line held, Marshall Goldberg, shifty Pitt sophomore, was stopped cold, and 55,000 fans looked in vain for a touchdown at the Polo Grounds yesterday...It was an exciting contest featured by fast tackling and great kicking."

The first half was a punting duel with Marshall Goldberg's 26-yard gain the only highlight. Early in the third quarter, the Pitt offense gained possession at their 45-yard line. Bobby LaRue gained 4 yards on first down. A Goldberg to Bill Daddio pass play gained a first down. Goldberg gained 5 yards around left end and followed that with a 7-yard gain for a first down on the Fordham 33-yard line. Frank Patrick made 8 yards over center. LaRue made a first down on the 23-yard line. LaRue gained 7 yards to the 16-yard line. Goldberg only mustered 1 yard on two tries. On fourth down Patrick busted through center for a first down on the Fordham 12-yard line. LaRue got three yards over right guard. Goldberg gained a yard on second down. LaRue picked up 4 yards over right tackle. On fourth down LaRue was stopped short by inches and Fordham took over on downs. The Pitt defense held and regained possession on the Fordham 43-yard line. On third down John Urban's pass to John Wood was intercepted by Fordham halfback Joe Woitkoski and the Panthers went home with a 4–1–1 record. Fordham finished their season with a 5–1–2 record.

The Pitt starting lineup for the game against Fordham was Bill Daddio (left end), Tony Matisi (left tackle), William Glassford (left guard), Henry Adams (center), Dante Dalle Tezze (right guard), Averell Daniell (right tackle), Fabian Hoffman (right end), John Michelosen (quarterback), Marshall Goldberg (left halfback), Bobby LaRue (right halfback) and Bill Stapulis (fullback). Substitutes appearing in the game for Pitt were Elmer Merkovsky, Albin Lezouski, Don Hensley, Walter Raskowski, George Delich, Frank Souchak, John Chickerneo, Arnold Greene, John Urban, Harold Stebbins, John Wood and Frank Patrick.

=== Penn State ===
Week 7: Penn State at Pitt

Team	1	2	3	4	Total
Penn State	0	0	7	0	7
• Pitt	7	0	7	20	34

- Date: November 7, 1936
- Location: Pitt Stadium
  Pittsburgh, PA
- Game start: 2:00 p.m.
- Game attendance: 15,692
- Game weather: clear and chilly
- Referee: Russell Goodwin (W. & J.)

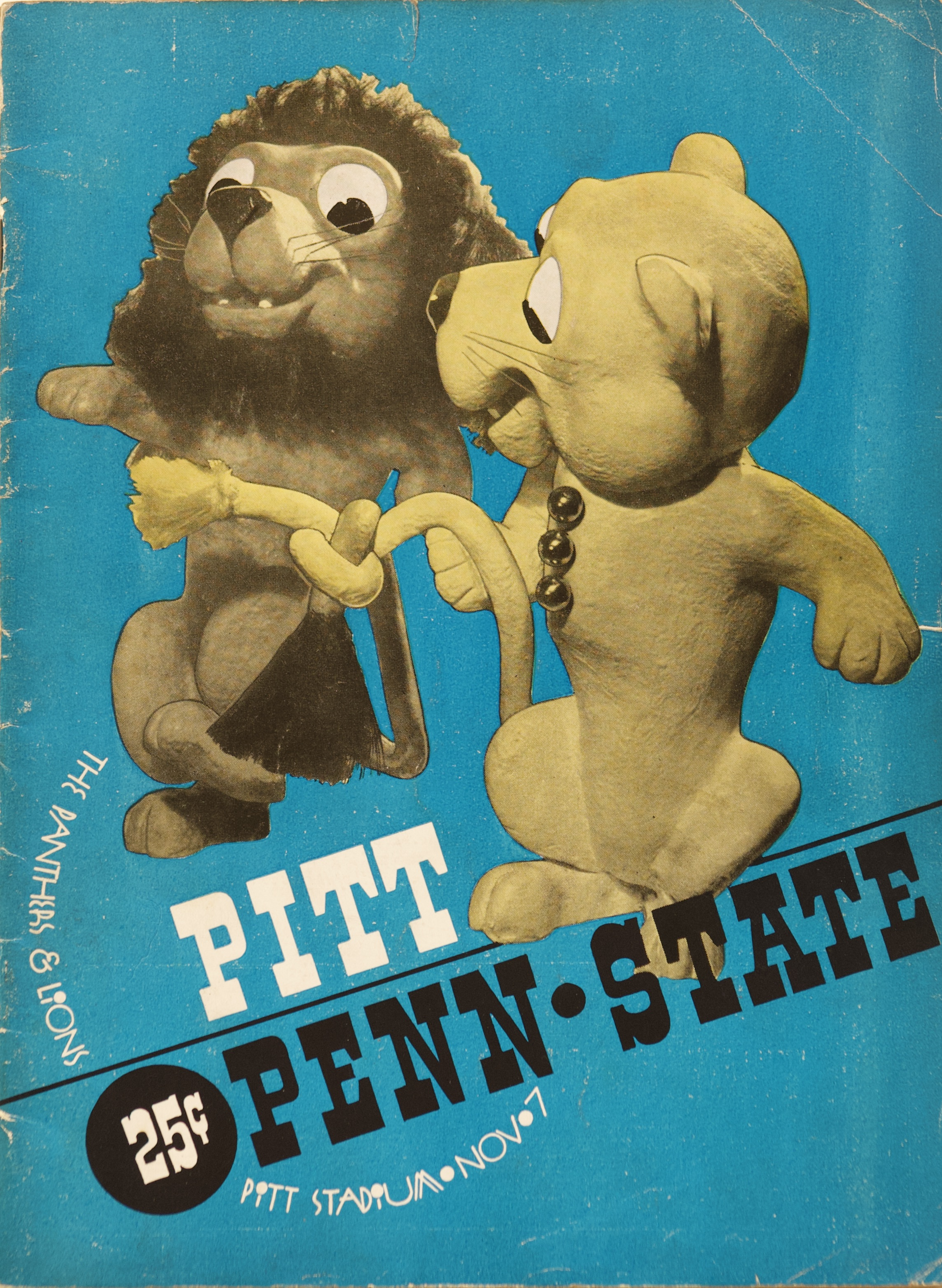
Program for November 7 game versus Penn State

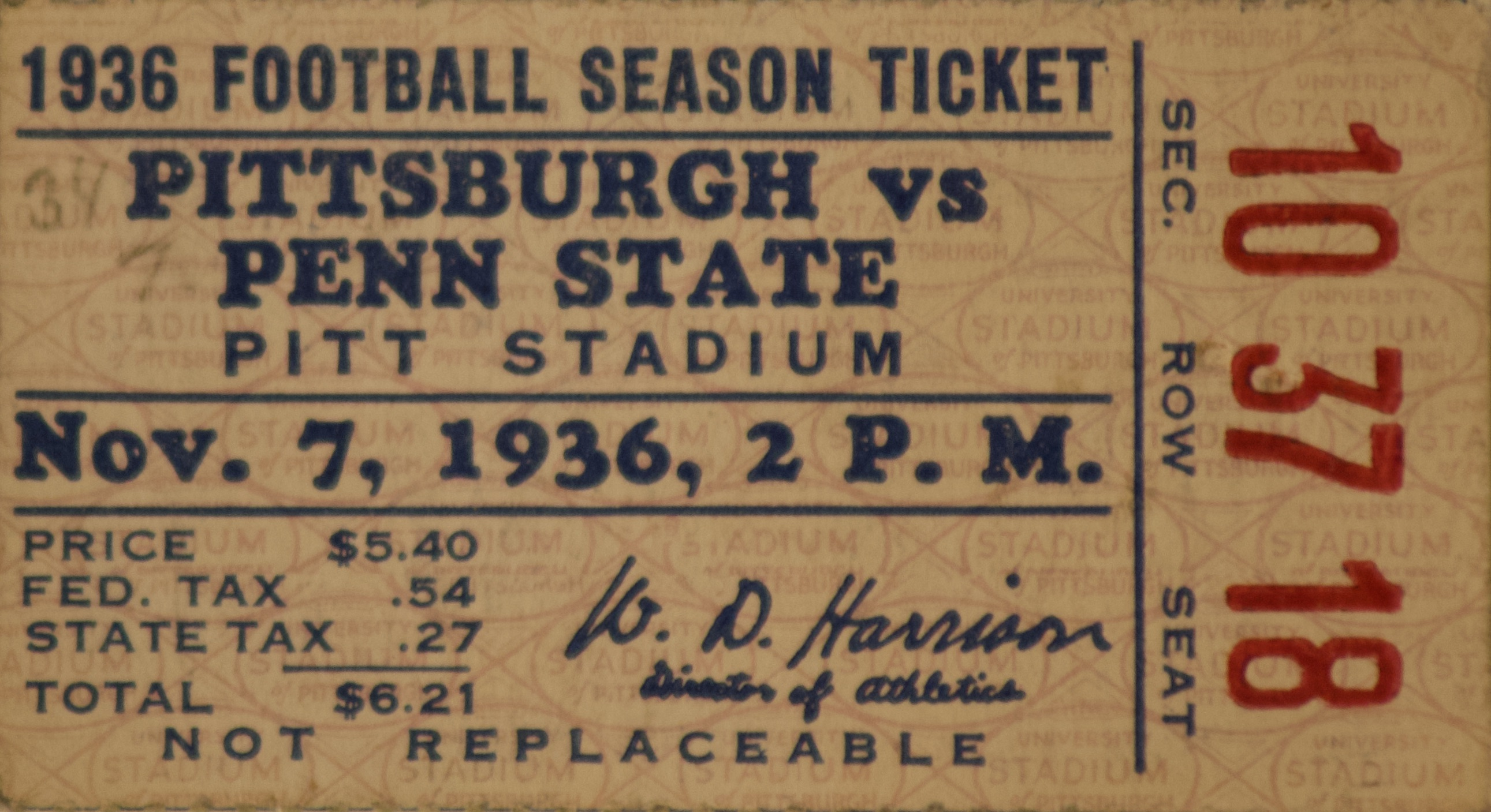
Ticket stub for November 7 game versus Penn State

On November 7, Penn State coach Bob Higgins brought his Nittany Lions to Pitt Stadium to try to end their 13-game winless streak against the Panthers. The all-time series stood at 21–12–2 in Pitt's favor. The Lions were 2–3 on the season. They beat Muhlenberg (45–0) in their opener, but then lost 3 straight games to Villanova (13–0), Lehigh (7–6) and Cornell (13–7), before beating Syracuse (18–0).

Coach Sutherland wrote in The Pittsburgh Press: "I'm afraid Penn State doesn't look as dangerous to Pitt as it did a month ago. Still, this is the game for the Lions, and we have to guard against the situation that prevailed in the game with Duquesne."

The Pitt Panthers and coach Sutherland extended their mastery over the Nittany Lions by a score of 34–7. Pitt scored the second time it gained possession in the first period. Bill Daddio recovered a fumble on the Penn State 25-yard line. On third down Marshall Goldberg completed a 26-yard touchdown pass to Harold Stebbins. Daddio converted the extra point and Pitt led 7–0. In the second quarter the Panthers fumbled away two scoring opportunities. The State pass defense then thwarted two more Pitt drives before halftime. In the second half Penn State punted and Pitt had possession on their own 20-yard line. A 10-play drive ended with Frank Patrick scoring from the one. Daddio added the point and Pitt led 14–0. Sutherland then made many substitutions and the State offense took advantage. They returned the kick-off to their 35-yard line. Eight rushing plays advanced the ball to the Pitt 46-yard line. A double lateral from Harry Harrison to Wendell Wear gained 33 yards to the Pitt 13-yard line. Harrison fooled the Pitt defense by loitering near the sideline as his team hurriedly lined up. Wear threw him a quick pass and Penn State had a touchdown. Joe Metro added the point and the lead was cut in half. The miffed Pitt Panthers proceeded to score 3 touchdowns in the final quarter. Stebbins scored from the 3-yard line, Johnny Wood raced 48 yards for his score and John Urban finished the onslaught with a 44-yard gallop. Forty-four Panthers saw playing time.

The Panthers gained 457 yards and earned 15 first downs. Penn State garnered 208 yards and 8 first downs. Penn State finished the season with a 3–5 record.

The Pitt starting lineup for the game against Penn State was Bill Daddio (left end), Elmer Merkovsky (left tackle), Walter Raskowski (left guard), Don Hensley (center), Albin Lezouski (right guard), George Delich (right tackle), Fabian Hoffman (right end), John Chickerneo (quarterback), Marshall Goldberg (left halfback), Harold Stebbins (right halfback) and Frank Patrick (fullback). Substitutes appearing in the game for Pittsburgh were Charles Fleming, Frank Souchak, Edward Spotovich, Joe Morrow, Walter Miller, Ben Kopec, Averell Daniell, Tony Matisi, Ben Asavitch, Robert Daufenbach, George Musulin, Alfred Berger, Steve Petro, Dante Dalle Tezze, Luther Richards, Albert Walton, George Yocos, Henry Adams, Robert Dannies, Willard Curry, Cleon Linderman, John Michelosen, Arnold Greene, James Kosinski, Bob McClure, Howard Jackman, John Urban, Leo Malarkey, John Wood, Joseph Troglione, Charles Shea, Bill Stapulis, and John Dougert.

Scoring summary

Quarter	Time	Drive			Team	Scoring information	Score	
Quarter	Time	Plays	Yards	TOP	Team	Scoring information	Penn State	Pittsburgh
1		3	25		Pittsburgh	Harold Stebbins 26-yard touchdown reception from Marshall Goldberg, Bill Daddio kick good	0	7
3		12	80		Pittsburgh	Frank Patrick 1-yard touchdown run, Bill Daddio kick good	0	14
3		10	65		Penn State	Harry Harrison 13-yard touchdown reception from Wendell Wear, Joe Metro kick good	7	14
4		8	71		Pittsburgh	Harold Stebbins 3-yard touchdown run, Bill Daddio kick good	7	21
4					Pittsburgh	John Wood 48-yard touchdown run, Bill Daddio kick good	7	28
4					Pittsburgh	John Urban 44-yard touchdown run, Arnold Greene kick no good	7	34
"TOP" = time of possession. For other American football terms, see Glossary of American football.							7	34

=== At Nebraska ===
Week 8: Pitt at Nebraska

Team	1	2	3	4	Total
• Pitt	0	12	0	7	19
Nebraska	0	6	0	0	6

- Date: November 14, 1936
- Location: Memorial Stadium
  Lincoln, NE
- Game start: 2:00 p.m.
- Game attendance: 36,000
- Game weather: clear and dry
- Referee: H. G. Hedges (Dartmouth)

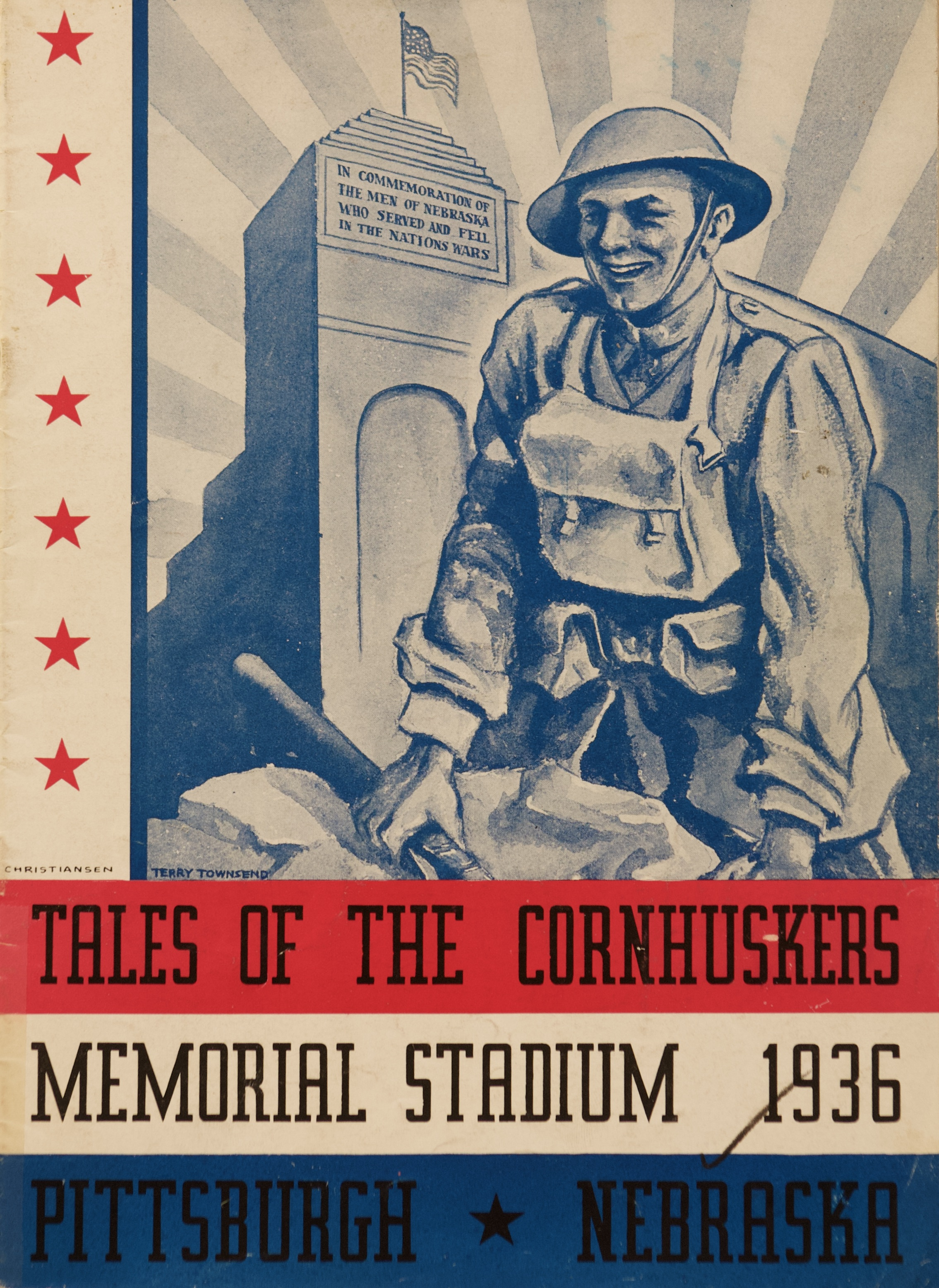
Program for November 14 game versus Nebraska

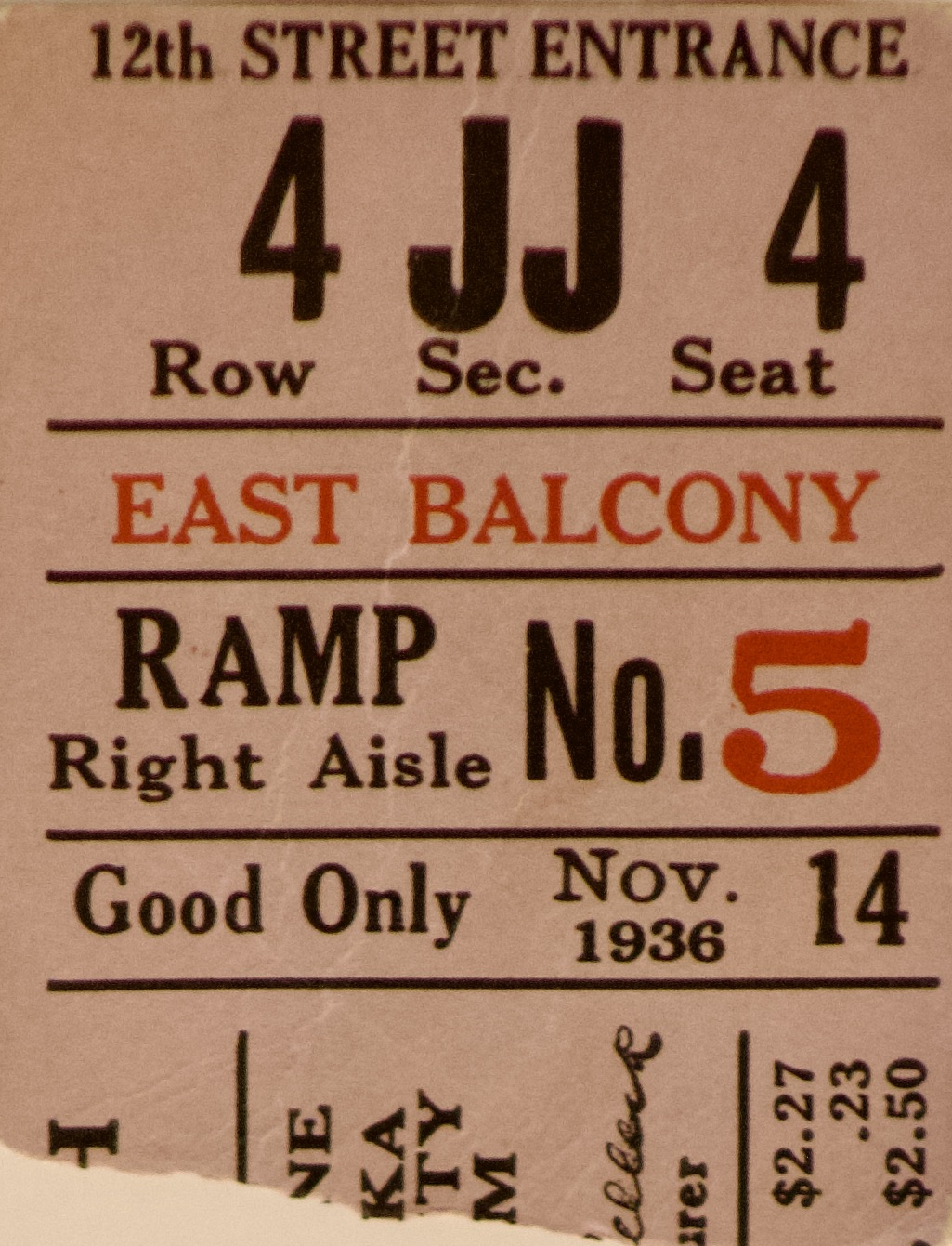
Ticket stub for November 14 game versus Nebraska

The final road game of the season matched the Panthers against Dana X. Bible's Cornhuskers in Lincoln, Nebraska. The Huskers were 5–1 and already assured of at least a tie for the Big 6 Conference title. Their only blemish was a 7–0 loss to Minnesota. Fullback Sam Francis was a consensus All-American and the first player taken in the 1937 NFL draft. Coach Bible decided to practice behind closed gates and stated: "It's our big chance and we want to leave no stone unturned getting ready for the Panthers. We have been saving a few things for Pitt and Monday will add another play or two."

Pitt led the series 6–1–3. Nebraska won the initial contest in 1921. Pitt had not lost to the Huskers since, but the three ties, all scoreless, (1928, 1930 and 1932) were played in Lincoln. John Bentley of The Nebraska State Journal wrote that the Cornhuskers were the betting favorite because "(1) Pitt is playing on the Husker's home playground. (2) Nebraska is in better shape physically than the Panthers, Bill Stapulis, fullback, being left at home and Bill Glassford, regular guard, limping badly. (3) Nebraska is improved more than Pitt since they met the last time in Pittsburgh when the Panthers pulled out a 6 to 0 decision. (4) There is a feeling of general confidence in the Husker team."

Wednesday night (November 11) the Panthers boarded the train and headed west for Chicago. They arrived on Thursday morning and worked out on Stagg Field at the University of Chicago before boarding the train for Nebraska. The Panthers housed at the Blackstone Hotel in Omaha. On Friday, they held practice on the parade ground at Fort Crook, a U. S. Army post. On Saturday morning the squad rode the Chicago, Burlington & Quincy train into Lincoln.

Sutherland "said his squad was in good condition and ready for a terrific battle." He added: "We know we will be in a great battle, for we consider Nebraska to be the greatest team in the country."

The Panthers vaulted back into Rose Bowl contention with a dominating 19 to 6 victory. Pitt's offensive power earned 22 first downs to Nebraska's 6, and gained 267 yards rushing to 113 for the Huskers. Pitt completed 5 of 7 passes for an additional 77 yards.

After a scoreless first quarter, the Panthers' Bill Daddio missed a field goal attempt on the first play of the second period. An exchange of punts allowed Nebraska to gain possession on the Panther 35-yard line. Sam Francis and Lloyd Cardwell rushed the ball to the 23-yard line for a first down. On second down, from the 21-yard line, Francis completed a touchdown pass to Cardwell over three Pitt defenders. The conversion attempt was low and the Huskers led 6 to 0. The Panthers offense awakened with less than four minutes to play in the half. A poor punt gave Pitt possession on the Husker 44-yard line. Arnold Greene found John Urban over the middle for a completion of 30 yards to the 14-yard line. Three plays later Greene, converted from quarterback to fullback for this game, bulled into the end zone from the 1-yard line to tie the score. Bill Daddio missed the extra point. Daddio kicked off, raced downfield and tackled Husker quarterback John Howell. Howell fumbled and Tony Matisi recovered for Pitt on the Husker 30-yard line. On first down Johnny Wood completed a 19 yard pass to Daddio on the Nebraska 11. A pass from Greene to John Michelosen put the ball on the 7-yard line. Urban raced around left end into the end zone as time expired in the first half. Daddio missed the placement and Pitt led 12 to 6. In the final period Nebraska blocked a 10-yard field goal attempt by Frank Souchak. Nebraska, with first down on their own 20-yard line, fumbled, and Leo Markovsky recovered for the Panthers on the 14-yard line. Four plays later Greene scored the second touchdown of his Pitt career and Souchak kicked the ball between the uprights to make the final score 19 to 6.

The Pitt starting lineup for the game against Nebraska was Bill Daddio (left end), Tony Matisi (left tackle), Walter Raskowski (left guard), Henry Adams (center), Dante Dalle Tezze (right guard), Averell Daniell (right tackle), Fabian Hoffman (right end), John Michelosen (quarterback), Marshall Goldberg (left halfback), Bobby LaRue (right halfback) and Frank Patrick (fullback). Substitutes appearing in the game for Pitt were Charles Fleming, Elmer Merkovsky, Steve Petro, Don Hensley, Albin Lezouski, Frank Souchak, John Chickerneo, Harold Stebbins, John Wood, John Urban and Arnold Greene.

Scoring summary

Quarter	Time	Drive			Team	Scoring information	Score	
Quarter	Time	Plays	Yards	TOP	Team	Scoring information	Pittsburgh	Nebraska
2		4	35		Nebraska	Lloyd Cardwell 21-yard touchdown reception from Sam Francis, Sam Francis kick no good	0	6
2		5	44		Pittsburgh	Arnold Greene 1-yard touchdown run, Bill Daddio kick no good	6	6
2		3	30		Pittsburgh	John Urban 7-yard touchdown run, Bill Daddio kick no good	12	6
4		4	12		Pittsburgh	Arnold Greene 3-yard touchdown run, Frank Souchak kick good	19	6
"TOP" = time of possession. For other American football terms, see Glossary of American football.							19	6

=== Carnegie Tech ===
Week 9: Carnegie Tech at Pitt

Team	1	2	3	4	Total
Carnegie Tech	0	7	7	0	14
• Pitt	3	14	7	7	31

- Date: November 26, 1936
- Location: Pitt Stadium
  Pittsburgh, PA
- Game start: 2:00 p.m.
- Game attendance: 40,000
- Game weather: windy and snow flurries
- Referee: C. M. Waters (Williams)

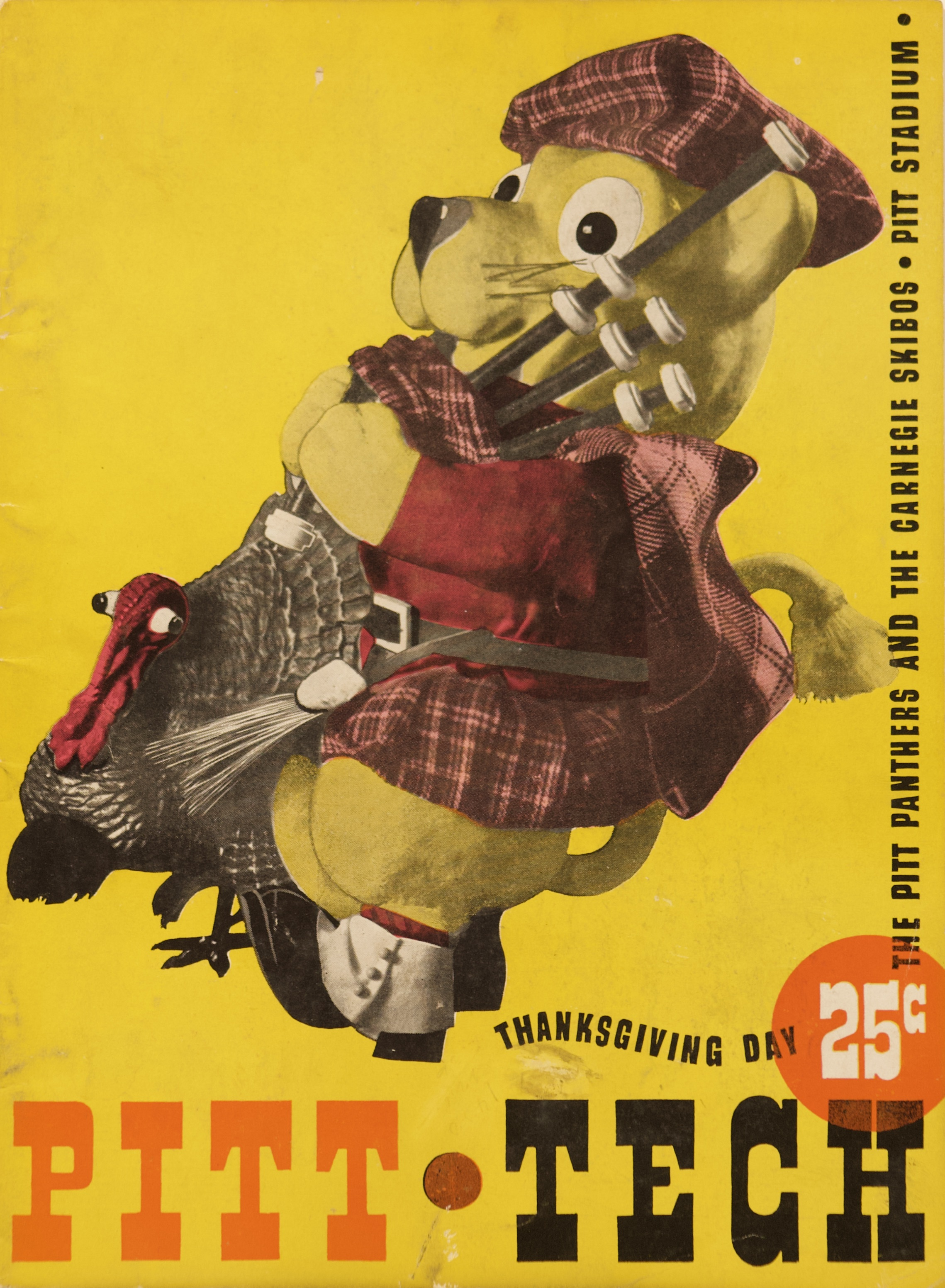
Program for November 26 game versus Carnegie Tech

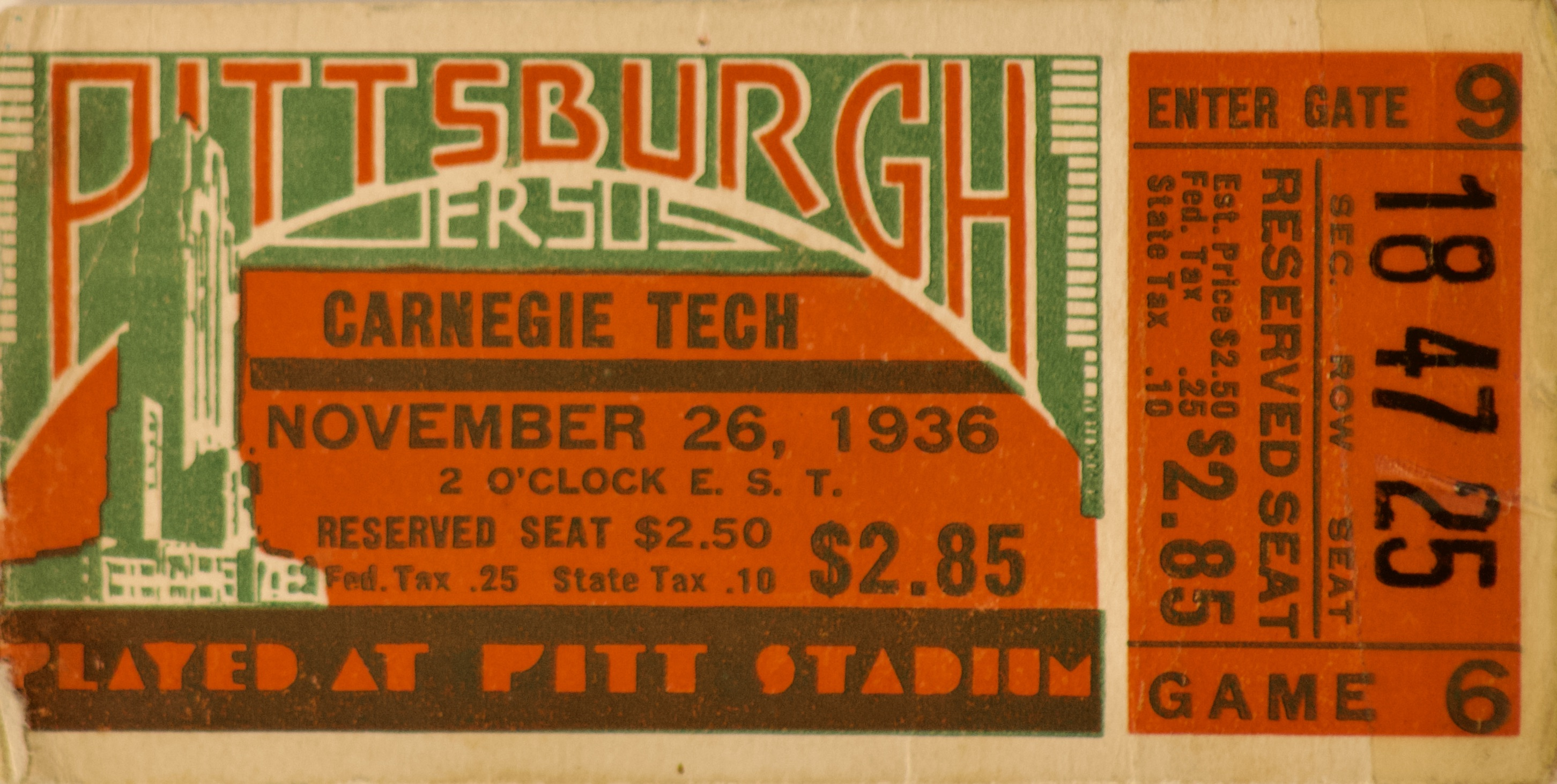
Ticket stub for November 26 game versus Carnegie Tech

The final game of the regular season with Carnegie Tech was the last time that Pitt and Tech met on Thanksgiving Day. Howard Harpster's Tartans were 2–5 on the season. The game had no bearing on the City Championship, since both teams lost to Duquesne. Pitt led the series 17–4–1.

This was Howard Harpster's last game as Tech coach and he left with a 4 year record of 12–19–3. Tech tackle Joe Slaminko injured his leg in the previous game and was replaced by Wayne Yeknich, otherwise, the Tartans were at full strength for the Panthers.

Ten Panthers suited up for their final home game – starters Bobby LaRue, Averill Daniell and Bill Glassford, along with able substitutes – Leo Malarkey, John Wood, Arnold Greene, John Dougert, Bob McClure, Joe Troglione and Cleon Linderman. Since the Panthers were held to a scoreless tie in the 1935 game by a 2–5 Tartan squad, and the Panthers still held hope for a Rose Bowl invitation, Sutherland started his strongest eleven. Bill Glassford was back at left guard and John Michelosen started at quarterback.

The Panthers beat Carnegie Tech 31–14. Pitt built a 17–0 cushion in the first quarter and a half, but the Tartans countered with two touchdowns of their own to cut the lead to 17–14 in the third period. Then two touchdowns by Marshall Goldberg iced the game for the Panthers. Tech received the opening kick-off and their offense advanced the ball to the Panther 17-yard line where they missed a field goal. The Panther offense then drove deep into Tartan territory and Bill Daddio converted a 23-yard field goal for a 3–0 lead. Early in the second period Goldberg raced around right end for a 42-yard touchdown run. Daddio converted the extra point. Later in the first half Pitt recovered a fumble on their own 38-yard line. On second down Arnold Greene carried the ball 53-yards to the Tartan 9-yard line. Bobby LaRue scored three plays later. Daddio's extra point was good and Pitt led 17–0. Just before halftime, Ray Carnelly, Tech quarterback, recovered a Frank Patrick fumble on the Panther 26-yard line. Halfback Jerry Matelan needed two rushing plays to score. Nestor Henrion added the point after to cut the lead to 17–7 at the break. Tech added a second touchdown on their first possession of the second half. They covered 56-yards in 5 plays. A 43-yard touchdown pass from Matelan to John Keller and conversion by Coleman Kopcsak made the score 17–14. Bobby LaRue fielded the ensuing kick-off and lateraled to Goldberg, who raced 87-yards for his second touchdown of the afternoon. Daddio added the extra point and Pitt led 24–14. In the last quarter Matelan fumbled a punt and Pitt substitute tackle George Delich recovered on the Tartan 17-yard line. Four rushing plays earned a first down on the 6-yard line. Then Goldberg went through left tackle for his third touchdown. Daddio converted and Pitt won 31–14.

Coach Sutherland told the Post-Gazette: "We worked very hard for this game and we managed to get 'up' very high. The boys realized they were in for a battle. You know, when Tech meets Pitt you have to be set for anything......What helped us yesterday, I think was the chance that Pitt might end up at the bottom of the pile in the city championship situation. It enabled them to be keyed up properly for the strong offense that the Tech men threw against them."

The Pitt starting lineup for the game against Carnegie Tech was Bill Daddio (left end), Tony Matisi (left tackle), Bill Glassford (left guard), Henry Adams (center), Dante Dalle Tezze (right guard), Averell Daniell (right tackle), Fabian Hoffman (right end), John Michelosen (quarterback), Marshall Goldberg (left halfback), Bobby LaRue (right halfback) and Frank Patrick (fullback). Substitutes appearing in the game for Pitt were Charles Fleming, Elmer Markovsky, Walter Raskowski, Steve Petro, Don Hensley, Cleon Linderman, Albin Lezouski, George Delich, Ted Schmidt, Frank Souchak, John Chickerneo, Robert McClure, John Urban, Joseph Troglione, Harold Stebbins, John Wood, Arnold Greene and John Dougert.

Scoring summary

Quarter	Time	Drive			Team	Scoring information	Score	
Quarter	Time	Plays	Yards	TOP	Team	Scoring information	Carnegie Tech	Pittsburgh
1			55		Pittsburgh	23-yard field goal by Bill Daddio	0	3
2		6	65		Pittsburgh	Marshall Goldberg 42-yard touchdown run, Bill Daddio kick good	0	10
2		5	63		Pittsburgh	Bobby LaRue 3-yard touchdown run, Bill Daddio kick good	0	17
2		2	26		Carnegie Tech	Jerry Matelan 7-yard touchdown run, Nestor Henrion kick good	7	17
3		5	56		Carnegie Tech	John Keller 46-yard touchdown reception from Jerry Matelan, Coleman Kopcsak kick good	14	17
4		1	87		Pittsburgh	Kickoff returned 87 yards for touchdown by Marshall Goldberg, Bill Daddio kick good	14	24
4		5	17		Pittsburgh	Marshall Goldberg 6-yard touchdown run, Bill Daddio kick good	14	31
"TOP" = time of possession. For other American football terms, see Glossary of American football.							14	31

=== Vs. Washington (Rose Bowl) ===
Week 10: Pitt versus Washington

Team	1	2	3	4	Total
• Pitt	7	0	7	7	21
Washington	0	0	0	0	0

- Date: January 1, 1937
- Location: Rose Bowl
  Pasadena, CA
- Game start: 2:15 p.m.
- Game attendance: 87,935
- Game weather: sunny and cool
- Referee: Bob Morris (Seattle)

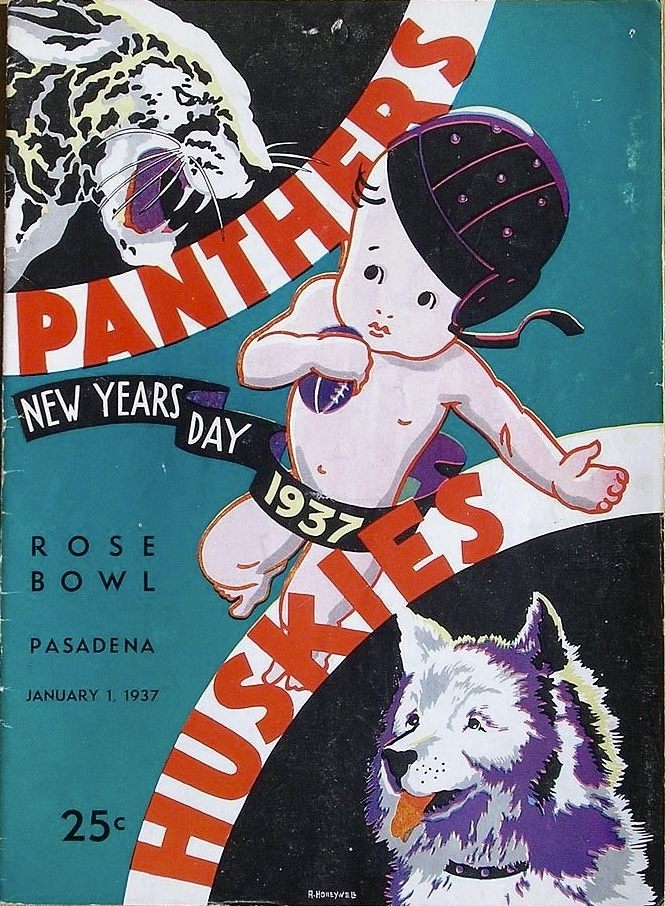
1937 Rose Bowl football program

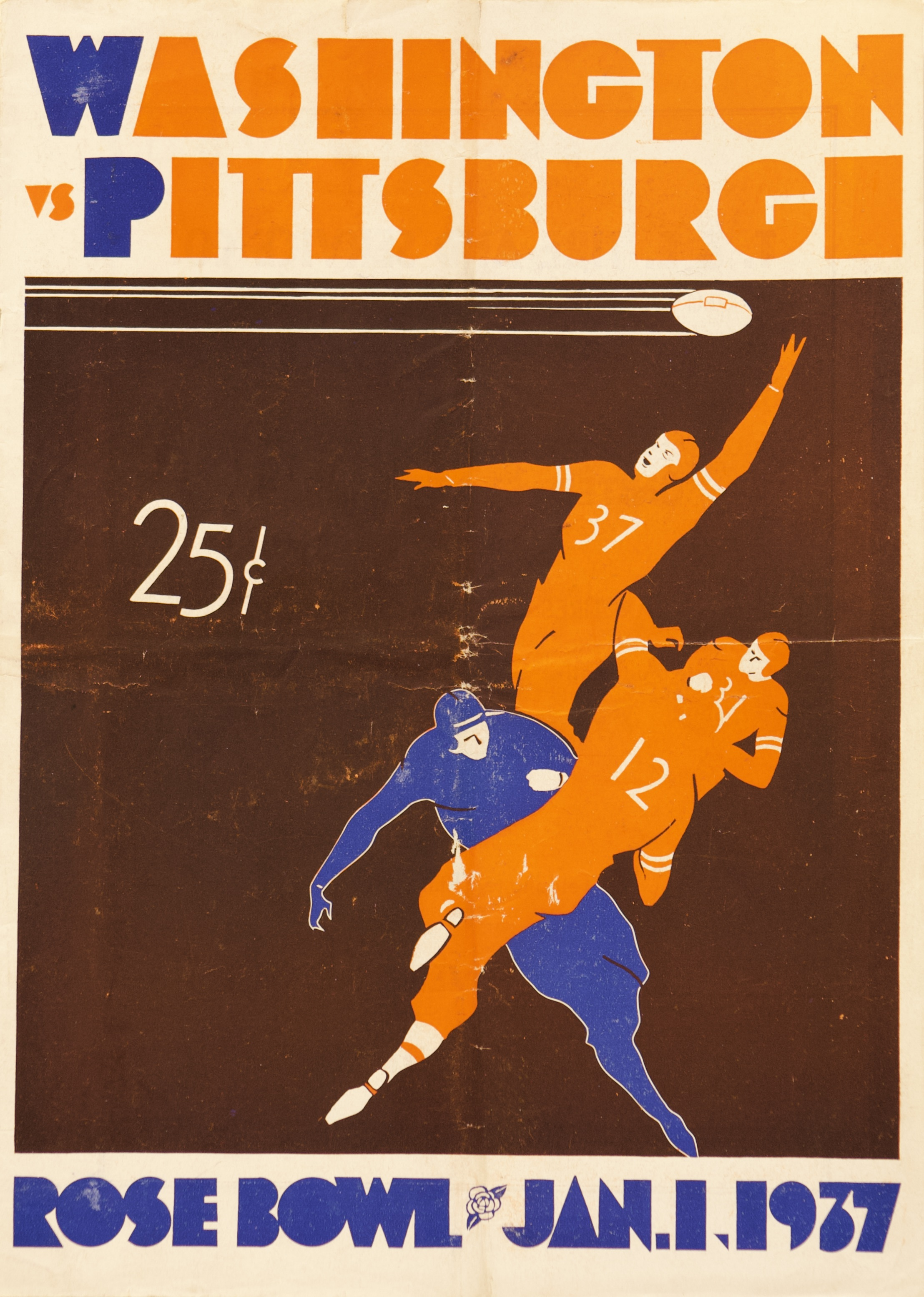
1937 "Outlaw" Rose Bowl program

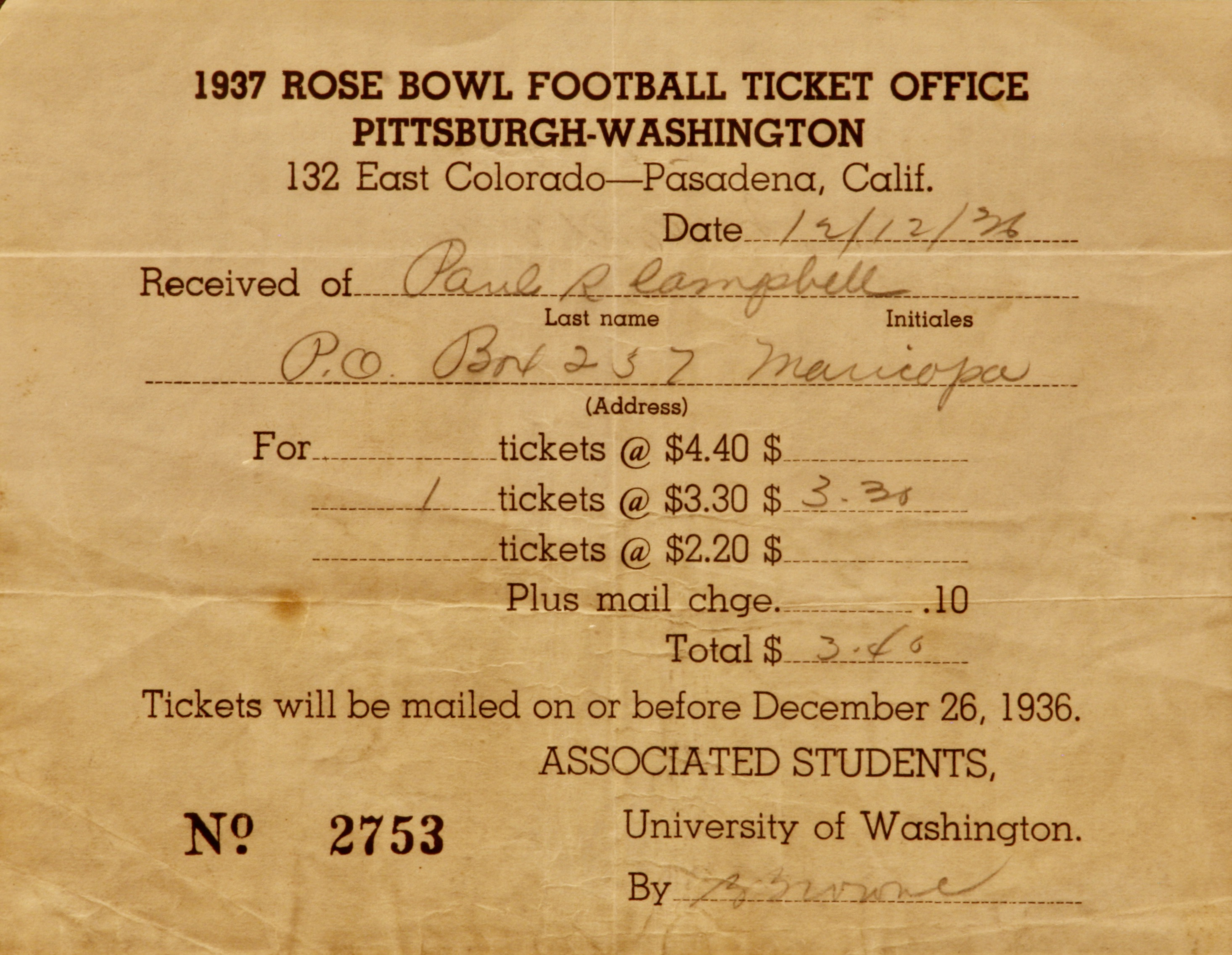
1937 Rose Bowl football ticket order form

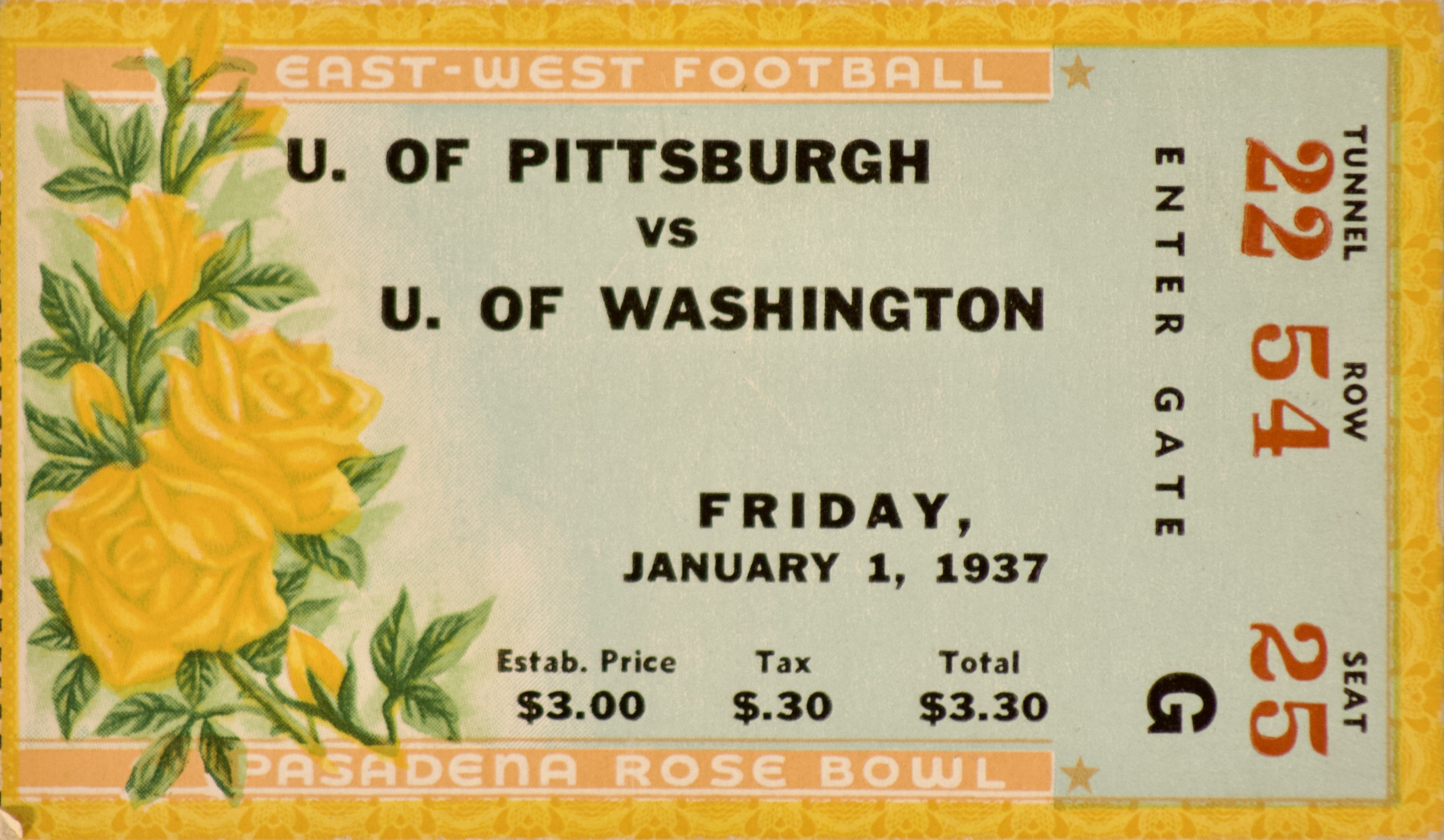
1937 Rose Bowl ticket stub

While the Panthers were defeating the Tartans on Thanksgiving Day, the Washington Huskies trounced the Washington State Cougars to secure the top spot in the Pacific Coast Conference. The Huskies, led by coach Jim Phelan, were 7–1–1 on the season. They lost to Minnesota in their home opener and were later tied by Stanford. By virtue of their victory over the Cougars, Washington was designated the west representative for the 1937 Rose Bowl, and they were allowed to choose their opponent. Alabama, Dartmouth, Pitt and LSU were under consideration. Ray Eckmann, Washington athletic director, told The Seattle Star: "We want the best team we can get. Jim Phelan and the boys say they want to meet the best one we can get and that goes. We are going to give careful consideration and then issue our invitation."

On December 4 the Washington Huskies Athletic Department invited the Pitt Panthers to be their New Year's Day opponent in Pasadena for the 1937 Tournament of Roses football game. Ray Eckmann told The Star: "Our intent has been to choose the team which is representative of the best in eastern football. Many sections have turned out splendid teams this year, any one of which might have made an acceptable opponent. Yet the unusually strong schedule which confronted Pittsburgh and the outstanding record it made, ending the season with a definite display of superiority, makes it the logical opponent to represent the east in this game. The further fact, that this week 10 of New York City's sports writers chose Pittsburgh as the winner of the Lambert Memorial Trophy...has confirmed our judgement." The choice of Pitt was not received with universal acclaim. The Post-Gazette reported that Sid Ziff of the Los Angeles Evening Herald-Express wrote: "My regards to the University of Washington. Also my sympathies. How did they ever forget about Louisiana State and Alabama? Washington can have the game. We don't want it." Maxwell Stiles of the Los Angeles Examiner agreed: "And so we'll have to put up with Pittsburgh again in the Rose Bowl? And when we could have had Louisiana State or Alabama. Of all the teams that ever played at Pasadena, Pitt has consistently done the greatest el foldo." Bob Foote of the Pasadena Star-News was more subdued "So it is Pittsburgh – a very strong team – some days. If it lives up to its best, we will have a real football game."

On December 14, The Pittsburgh Press reported: "Southern California football fans are so peeved at the selection of the University of Pittsburgh as Washington's opponent in the Rose Bowl game on New Year's Day that they have bought every ticket in the huge stadium. The 'SRO' sign was hung out on the Tournament of Roses ticket office this morning." The Rose Bowl seats 85,511 fans. Those tickets were sold out one week after they went on sale. 1,685 seats were added to insure a new attendance record.

The Panthers earned a ten-day break after their Thanksgiving Day victory. On December 7, coach Sutherland started preparing the team for the Washington Huskies. On Wednesday evening, December 16 (more than a week earlier than their previous Rose Bowl trips), the Pitt entourage (sixty-strong) departed for the west. The special train transporting the Panthers had "two club and lounge cars, a car which is equipped as a gymnasium with punching bags, rowing machines and a ping pong table, diner and regular Pullmans." In Chicago, the train switched to the Santa Fe line and made short stops in Kansas City, Missouri, where more than 1,000 fans greeted them at the station, and Marceline, Missouri, where the high school football coach and his squad hopped aboard the train for some quick handshakes. On Friday morning the Panthers arrived in Albuquerque, New Mexico. After a short sight-seeing tour and lunch, they worked out on the University of New Mexico football field. Lobo Coach Gwinn Henry and hundreds of New Mexicans observed the practice that ended with a 20-minute touchball game. On Friday evening the team was back on the train and on Saturday afternoon they arrived in San Bernardino, California. The team was taken to the Arrowhead Springs Hotel and immediately suited up for two hours of practice on the Perris Hill Park (Pittsburgh Pirates spring baseball camp site). Coach Sutherland stated: "We're going to work our heads off for a week, then we will begin to taper off....I have never brought a team to the Coast that seemed to be in such excellent spirits and as fit as this one." On December 30, after another 2-hour workout, the Panthers entourage bused to the Huntington Hotel in Pasadena. An afternoon workout on the Rose Bowl field was scheduled for the following day. The only snafu was regarding which team would wear the white jerseys in the Bowl game. Since the Panthers only brought their blue jerseys, both teams sported their colors, so the fans were treated to the blue team against the purple team.

Grantland Rice spoke to both coaches: "Jock Sutherland told me: "Our last two showings out here have been terrible. I'll admit this. But I think I have a team that is ready to go. I have one of the best teams I have ever coached – but many of them are sophomores....It is the youngest team I have ever had for a big game. They can be great – or just fair. I don't know what they will be." Phelen countered: "We are out to win this game. Pitt has never won in the Rose Bowl, but neither have we. I haven't the reserve power Pittsburgh has, but I think I have a better first team...I know Pittsburgh is keyed up, but so are we. That means a rough, hard game played to the limit. That suits us."

Bill Henry of The Los Angeles Times reported: "When Pittsburgh's peevish Panthers, stung to a burning fury by uncomplimentary local comments, trounced Washington, 21 to 0, before 87,196 Rose Bowl occupants yesterday they challenged the time-honored axiom which tells us that hell hath no fury like a woman scorned. The Pitts were plenty furious."

The Panthers second possession started on their own 45-yard line. An 18-yard dash by Goldberg followed by a 25-yard LaRue run through center advanced the ball to the 10-yard line. The eight-play drive ended with a Frank Patrick 1-yard dive into the end zone. Bill Daddio converted the extra point and Pitt led 7 to 0. In the second quarter, the Panther offense advanced the ball to the Husky 34-yard line, but turned the ball over on an interception. The Huskies engineered a drive to the Panther 19-yard line, where the Panther defense took the ball on downs. At the start of the third period Marshall Goldberg fumbled and Washington recovered on the Pitt 29-yard line. Pitt regained possession on the next play when Don Hensley intercepted a pass on the 25-yard line . The Panther offense needed seven plays to score. Frank Patrick went over guard from the 3-yard line and Bill Daddio added the placement. The Washington offense tried to pass their way into the scoring column but to no avail. In the final stanza Bill Daddio picked off an errant lateral from Husky halfback Byron Haines and scampered 71 yards for the final touchdown. He then converted his third extra point and Pitt won their first and final Rose Bowl 21 to 0.

Coach Sutherland told The Pasadena Post: "The team was right and I had no worry about the game after the second time we had the ball. It takes more than ability to win a ball game at times and the boys never forgot the remarks made by Los Angeles sports writers after Pittsburgh was selected."

Washington coach Phelan agreed with Sutherland: "The newspapers that ridiculed the Panthers when they were picked for the game made the Pitt team mad. They made Jock Sutherland mad. But all they did for me was to stop my boys from pointing toward a tough football contest. Pittsburgh was hot, smart, and had too many reverses."

The Pitt starting lineup for the Rose Bowl game was Bill Daddio (left end), Tony Matisis (left tackle), Bill Glassford (left guard), Don Hensley (center), Steve Petro (right guard), Averell Daniell (right tackle), Fabian Hoffman (right end), John Micholsen (quarterback), Marshall Goldberg (left halfback), Bobby LaRue (right halfback) and Frank Patrick (fullback). Substitutes appearing in the game for Pitt were Frank Souchak, Edward Spotovich, George Delich, Albin Lezouski, Elmer Merkovski, Walter Raskowski, Dante Dalle Tezze, Henry Adams, Robert Dannies, John Chickerneo, Harold Stebbins, John Urban, Leo Malarkey, John Wood, Bill Stapulis and Arnold Greene.

Scoring summary

Quarter	Time	Drive			Team	Scoring information	Score	
Quarter	Time	Plays	Yards	TOP	Team	Scoring information	Pittsburgh	Washington
1		8	55		Pittsburgh	Frank Patrick 1-yard touchdown run, Bill Daddio kick good	7	0
3		7	75		Pittsburgh	Frank Patrick 3-yard touchdown run, Bill Daddio kick good	14	0
4		1	65		Pittsburgh	Interception returned 65 yards for touchdown by Bill Daddio, Bill Daddio kick good	21	0
"TOP" = time of possession. For other American football terms, see Glossary of American football.							21	0

== Individual scoring summary ==
1936 Pittsburgh Panthers scoring summary
Player	Touchdowns	Extra points	Field goals	Safety	Points
Marshall Goldberg	6	0	0	0	36
Frank Patrick	4	3	0	0	27
John Wood	4	0	0	0	24
Harold Stebbins	4	0	0	0	24
Leo Malarkey	4	0	0	0	24
William Daddio	1	10	1	0	19
Robert LaRue	2	0	0	0	12
Fabian Hoffmann	2	0	0	0	12
Arnold Greene	2	0	0	0	12
John Urban	2	0	0	0	12
William Stapulis	1	0	0	0	6
Tony Matisi	1	0	0	0	6
Frank Souchak	0	6	0	0	6
Charles Fleming	0	3	0	0	3
Averell Daniell	0	1	0	0	1
Totals	33	23	1	0	224

== Postseason ==
On December 1, the Panthers were awarded the initial August V. Lambert Memorial Trophy for having the best football team in the east. The trophy, awarded by a committee of New York sportswriters, was a gold football mounted on a base surrounded by smaller footballs. The award was presented by Henry L. and Victor A. Lambert in memory of their father.

Pitt was ranked third in the final week of the first Associated Press football poll.

On February 22, Joe Williams of the New York World Telegram broke a story that started the downfall of the Pitt football dynasty of the 30's. At the Rose Bowl, Coach Sutherland asked the athletic director, Don Harrison, for extra spending money for his squad. The players were upset that the Washington Huskies received $100 for expenses and new suits to wear to the bowl reception. Harrison refused to comply and words were exchanged. Mr. Harrison's final retort was: "I made you, and now I'm going to break you." Coach Sutherland ended up giving the players money from his own pocket. The feud continued, but was not made public until Mr. Williams' article. One month later Mr. Harrison's resignation was accepted at a special meeting of the athletic council.

== All-Americans ==
- **Averell Daniell** (tackle) – First team United Press; First team Collier's Weekly; First team Associated Press; First team Newspaper Enterprise Association; First team Central Press
- William Glassford (guard) – First team International News Service; Second team Central Press; Third team Associated Press
- William Daddio (end) – Third team Associated Press; Third team United Press

*Bold - Consensus All-American

== National championship ==
The 1936 team was selected or recognized as a national champion by multiple selectors which are recognized as "major" (i.e. national in scope) in the official NCAA football records book, by College Football Data Warehouse, and according to a Sports Illustrated study that has served as the historical basis of the university's historical national championship claims since its original publication.

The following selectors named Pitt the 1936 National Champion:

- 1st-N-Goal
- Angelo Louisa
- Boand System*
- Bob Kirlin
- College Football Researchers Association*
- Earl Jessen
- Esso Gas
- Houlgate System*
- Jim Koger
- Loren Maxwell
- Patrick Premo

* A "major" selector that was "national scope" according to the official NCAA football records book.

== Team players drafted into the NFL ==
Player	Position	Round	Pick	NFL club
Averell Daniell	Tackle	2	19	Green Bay Packers
Bobby LaRue	Back	3	30	Cleveland Rams
Bill Glassford	Guard	4	37	Detroit Lions
