= Ted Schmitt =

American football player (1916–2001)

No. 41
- Position: Guard

Personal information
- Born: October 2, 1916; Pittsburgh, Pennsylvania, U.S.
- Died: March 11, 2001 (aged 84); Port Orange, Florida, U.S.
- Listed height: 5 ft 11 in (1.80 m)
- Listed weight: 219 lb (99 kg)

Career information
- High school: Carrick (Pittsburgh)
- College: Pittsburgh (1934–1937)
- NFL draft: 1938: undrafted

Career history
- Philadelphia Eagles (1938–1940)

Awards and highlights
- National champion (1937)

Career NFL statistics
- Games played: 33
- Games started: 12
- Stats at Pro Football Reference

Theodore Alfred Schmitt (October 2, 1916 – March 11, 2001) was an American professional football guard who played three seasons with the Philadelphia Eagles of the National Football League (NFL). He played college football at the University of Pittsburgh.

== Early life and college ==
Theodore Alfred Schmitt was born on October 2, 1916, in Pittsburgh, Pennsylvania. He attended Carrick High School in Pittsburgh.

Schmitt was a member of the Pittsburgh Panthers of the University of Pittsburgh from 1934 to 1937 and a three-year letterman from 1935 to 1937. The 1936 Panthers were named national champions by the contemporary Boand math system and retroactively years later by the Football Researchers poll and Houlgate math system. The Panthers were consensus national champions in 1937. He later returned to Pittsburgh and graduated with a master's degree in 1947.

== Professional career ==
Schmitt signed with the Philadelphia Eagles in 1938 after going undrafted in the 1938 NFL draft. He played in all 11 games, starting two, for the Eagles during the 1938 season. He appeared in all 11 games for the second consecutive season, starting eight, in 1939 and scored a fumble recovery touchdown. Schmitt played in all 11 games for the third straight year, starting two, in 1940 and rushed once for six yards while also catching one pass for eight yards. He became a free agent after the season.

== Coaching career and personal life ==
Schmitt was an assistant football coach at St. Joseph's Preparatory School in Philadelphia during his NFL career. He became the head coach at Sharon Hill High School in Sharon Hill, Pennsylvania in 1941. He then served four years in the United States Navy during World War II, and returned to Sharon Hill after the war. Schmitt became an assistant coach for the Pittsburgh Panthers in 1948. He was then an assistant coach for the Harvard Crimson from 1950 to 1960. He joined the UMass Redmen as an assistant coach in 1961.

Schmitt died on March 11, 2001, in Port Orange, Florida.
