= Jack Johnson (defensive back) =

American football player (1933–2015)

No. 49, 42, 32
- Position: Defensive back

Personal information
- Born: December 11, 1933; Pittsburgh, Pennsylvania, U.S.
- Died: October 18, 2015 (aged 81); Evanston, Illinois, U.S.
- Listed height: 6 ft 3 in (1.91 m)
- Listed weight: 198 lb (90 kg)

Career information
- High school: Carrick (PA)
- College: Miami (FL)
- NFL draft: 1957: 4th round, 49th overall pick

Career history
- Chicago Bears (1957–1959); Dallas Cowboys (1960)*; Buffalo Bills (1960–1961); Dallas Texans (1961); New York Titans (1962)*
- * Offseason or practice squad member only

Career NFL/AFL statistics
- Interceptions: 8
- Fumble recoveries: 1
- Punts: 30
- Punting yards: 1,057
- Longest punt: 50
- Stats at Pro Football Reference

John Connell Johnson (December 11, 1933 – October 18, 2015) was an American professional football defensive back in the National Football League (NFL) for the Chicago Bears. He also was a member of the Buffalo Bills and Dallas Texans in the American Football League (AFL). He played college football at the University of Miami.

== Early life ==
Johnson attended Carrick High School, where he played as a running back. He accepted a football scholarship from the University of Miami. During his first years, he was tried at different positions, including halfback. In his last two seasons he also was the team's punter.

As a senior, he settled as a two-way player at offensive end and defensive back, becoming a starter for the first time in his college career. He was second on the team with 8 receptions for 98 yards (12.3-yard avg.), 2 receiving touchdowns, while also registering 34 tackles (fourth on the team), and 35 punts for a 38.2-yard average.

In 2004, he was inducted into the University of Miami Sports Hall of Fame.

== Professional career ==
Johnson was selected by the Chicago Bears in the fourth round (49th overall) of the 1957 NFL draft. As a rookie, he had 4 interceptions and 11 punts for 398 yards (36.2-yard average).

In 1958, he tallied one interception and 18 punts for 627 yards (34.8-yard average). In 1959, he only appeared in 6 games (all starts), registering one interception and one punt for 32 yards.

He was selected by the Dallas Cowboys in the 1960 NFL expansion draft. On September 13, he was released before the start of the season.

On September 20, 1960, he was signed by the Buffalo Bills of the American Football League and became a part of the franchise's inaugural season. He appeared in 12 games (2 starts) and posted 2 interceptions.

On April 10, 1962, he was traded along with Paul Miller from the Dallas Texans to the New York Titans, in exchange for the rights to defensive end Curt Merz. He was released before the start of the season.

== Personal life ==
On October 18, 2015, he died from dementia and early-stage Alzheimer's disease.
