= Carrick High School =

Public school in Pittsburgh, Pennsylvania, US

Coordinates: 40.39083°N 79.98917°W

- 125 Parkfield Street; Pittsburgh, Pennsylvania, 15210; United States

Information
- Type: Public
- School district: Pittsburgh Public Schools
- Principal: Dawn Fitchell
- Staff: 48.94 (FTE)
- Grades: 9–12
- Enrollment: 515 (2024-2025)
- Student to teacher ratio: 10.52
- Colors: Blue and gold
- Athletics: Cross Country, Football, girls' soccer, boys' soccer, boys' tennis, girls' tennis, golf, boys' basketball, girls' basketball, wrestling, co-ed swimming, baseball, softball, boys' volleyball, girls' volleyball, boys' and girls' rugby, and hockey
- Athletics conference: City League (PIAA District 8)
- Mascot: Raider
- Representative: Cindy falls
- Website: www.pghschools.org/schools/9-12/carrick

Carrick High School is a public school in the Carrick neighborhood of Pittsburgh.

Carrick is one of ten high schools in the Pittsburgh Public Schools, and one of the few to offer Business Technology and Health Technology programs.

== Feeder district ==
The City of Pittsburgh neighborhoods which are served by Carrick High School are Allentown, Arlington, Arlington Heights, Beltzhoover, Bon Air, Brookline, Carrick, Knoxville, Overbrook, Mt. Oliver (Pittsburgh Section), Southside Slopes and St. Clair. It also includes the Borough of Mount Oliver.

== Business Technology program ==
The Business Technology program has three levels, the first being an Introduction to Entrepreneurship which lasts one year. Students explore business careers and success strategies while learning computer programs such as Microsoft Word, Powerpoint and Publisher. Level Two consists of a year of accounting, followed by half a year of Excel Spreadsheets and half a year of Access Database. The third level provides two options; students can either choose to take a year of Accounting II, or half a year of Web Design and half a year of Business Law.

== Health Technology program ==
The program was established in 1988, and prepares students for a career in the medical field. The program is divided into three levels, the first being Health Technology I. During this time, students become aware of medical terms and definitions and take part in community service projects and field trips. Health Technology II involves a youth internship program with UPMC hospitals, as well as the exploration of areas such as anesthesiology, emergency medicine, gerontology, nursing and occupational therapy. The final stage, Health Technology III, links together the high school and the Community College of Allegheny County, offering students the opportunity to enroll and gain credits in at least one college-level course.

== Theater ==
Carrick is one of the few city schools to have a theater program, It was a contestant in the 2007 Gene Kelly Awards for a production of Crazy For You.

== Notable alumni ==
- Tom Atkins (class of 1956) — actor
- Jimmy Beaumont (class of 1957) — vocalist for The Skyliners
- Janet Vogel — vocalist for The Skyliners
- Michael Dawida (class of 1967) — American politician
- Phyllis Hyman (class of 1968) — American singer-songwriter and actress
- Jack Johnson (class of 1952) — NFL player
- Tom Modrak (class of 1960) — American football executive
- Ted Schmitt, NFL player
- Joe Verscharen (class of 1957) — vocalist for The Skyliners
- Milan Vooletich (class of 1960) — American football player and coach
- John Wehner (class of 1986) — MLB player and broadcaster
