= Edward Spotovich =

American basketball player (1916–2002)

Personal information
- Born: May 6, 1916 Pittsburgh, Pennsylvania, U.S.
- Died: September 7, 2002 (aged 86) Uniontown, Pennsylvania, U.S.
- Listed height: 6 ft 2 in (1.88 m)
- Listed weight: 190 lb (86 kg)

Career information
- High school: South (Pittsburgh, Pennsylvania)
- College: Pittsburgh (1935–1938)
- Position: Forward / center

Career history
- 1938: Pittsburgh Pirates

Career highlights
- National champion (1937)

Edward S. Spotovich (May 6, 1916 – September 7, 2002) was an American professional basketball player. He played college basketball and football for the University of Pittsburgh. In football, the 1937 team went undefeated and were named national champions in the AP Poll. Spotovich then played in the National Basketball League for the Pittsburgh Pirates during the 1938–39 season and averaged 4.3 points per game in three games played.

Spotovich then played semi-professional basketball in Connecticut and Massachusetts. He served in World War II, then worked as a schoolteacher for 42 years at Connellsville High School.
