= 1936 Tampa Spartans football team =

American college football season

1936 Tampa Spartans football
- Conference: Independent
- Record: 5–3–2
- Head coach: Nash Higgins (4th season)
- Home stadium: Plant Field

1936 Southern college football independents records
	Conf.			Overall
Team	W	L	T	W		L		T
George Washington		–		7	–	1	–	1
Hardin–Simmons		–		9	–	2	–	0
Georgetown		–		6	–	2	–	1
Roanoke		–		6	–	2	–	1
Western Maryland		–		7	–	3	–	1
No. 18 Navy		–		6	–	3	–	0
Tampa		–		5	–	3	–	2
West Virginia		–		6	–	4	–	0
East Carolina		–		3	–	2	–	0
Catholic University		–		4	–	4	–	0
Jacksonville State		–		2	–	2	–	1
Oklahoma City		–		4	–	4	–	0
William & Mary Norfolk		–		4	–	4	–	0
Tennessee State		–		3	–	3	–	2
Oglethorpe		–		4	–	5	–	0
Texas Wesleyan		–		3	–	6	–	1
Troy State		–		3	–	6	–	0
Delaware		–		2	–	6	–	0
South Georgia Teachers		–		2	–	8	–	0
Rankings from AP Poll

The 1936 Tampa Spartans football team represented the University of Tampa as an independent during the 1936 college football season. Led by Nash Higgins in his fourth season as head coach, the Spartans compiled an overall record of 5–3–2. The team played home games at Plant Field in Tampa, Florida.

== Schedule ==
Date	Time	Opponent	Site	Result	Attendance	Source
September 26		Newberry	Plant Field; Tampa, FL	W 57–0	4,500	
October 2		at Miami (FL)	Miami Stadium; Miami, FL	T 0–0	200–300	
October 9		Georgia Tech JV	Plant Field; Tampa, FL	W 7–0		
October 17		at South Georgia Teachers	Statesboro, GA	W 27–0		
October 23	8:15 p.m.	Stetson	Plant Field; Tampa, FL	W 6–0	8,000	
October 30		South Georgia	Plant Field; Tampa, FL	W 27–0		
November 6		at Louisiana Tech	Tech Stadium; Ruston, LA	L 0–6		
November 13		Cumberland (TN)	Plant Field; Tampa, FL	T 0–0	5,000	
November 20		Rollins	Plant Field; Tampa, FL	L 7–0	6,000	
December 5		Western Kentucky State Teachers	Plant Field; Tampa, FL	L 20–23		
All times are in Eastern time
