= 1936 Tennessee State Tigers football team =

American college football season

1936 Tennessee State Tigers football
- Conference: Independent
- Record: 3–3–2
- Head coach: Walter S. Davis (4th season)
- Home stadium: State College field

1936 Southern college football independents records
	Conf.			Overall
Team	W	L	T	W		L		T
George Washington		–		7	–	1	–	1
Hardin–Simmons		–		9	–	2	–	0
Georgetown		–		6	–	2	–	1
Roanoke		–		6	–	2	–	1
Western Maryland		–		7	–	3	–	1
No. 18 Navy		–		6	–	3	–	0
West Virginia		–		6	–	4	–	0
East Carolina		–		3	–	2	–	0
Catholic University		–		4	–	4	–	0
Jacksonville State		–		2	–	2	–	1
Oklahoma City		–		4	–	4	–	0
William & Mary Norfolk		–		4	–	4	–	0
Tennessee State		–		3	–	3	–	2
Oglethorpe		–		4	–	5	–	0
Texas Wesleyan		–		3	–	6	–	1
Troy State		–		3	–	6	–	0
Delaware		–		2	–	6	–	0
South Georgia Teachers		–		2	–	8	–	0
Rankings from AP Poll

The 1936 Tennessee State Tigers football team represented Tennessee Agricultural & Industrial State College—now known as Tennessee State University—as an independent during the 1936 college football season. Led by Walter S. Davis in his fourth and final season as head coach, the Tigers compiled a record of 3–3–2.

== Schedule ==
Date	Time	Opponent	Site	Result	Attendance	Source
October 10		Alabama A&M	Nashville, TN	W 12–0	1,500	
October 17		Mississippi Industrial	State College field; Nashville, TN	W 56–6		
October 24		Clark (GA)^{†}	State College field; Nashville, TN	W 13–6	2,000	
October 31		Wilberforce	State College field; Nashville, TN	L 6–13	3,000	
November 7		at Louisville Municipal	Central High School stadium; Louisville, KY	L 0–6	2,000	
November 14		West Virginia State	Nashville, TN	L 0–7		
November 21		at Lane	Jackson, TN	T 0–0	2,900	
November 26	1:00 p.m.	vs. Kentucky State	Withrow Stadium; Cincinnati, OH	T 13–13		
^{†}Homecoming; All times are in Central time
