= Oklahoma City Stars =

- University: Oklahoma City University
- Nickname: Stars
- Association: NAIA
- Conference: Sooner Athletic Conference
- Athletic director: Corey Bray
- Location: Oklahoma City, Oklahoma
- Varsity teams: 16 (8 men's, 8 women's)
- Basketball arena: Abe Lemons Arena
- Baseball stadium: Jim Wade Stadium
- Softball stadium: Ann Lacy Stadium
- Soccer stadium: Brian Harvey Field
- Colors: Blue and white
- Website: www.ocusports.com
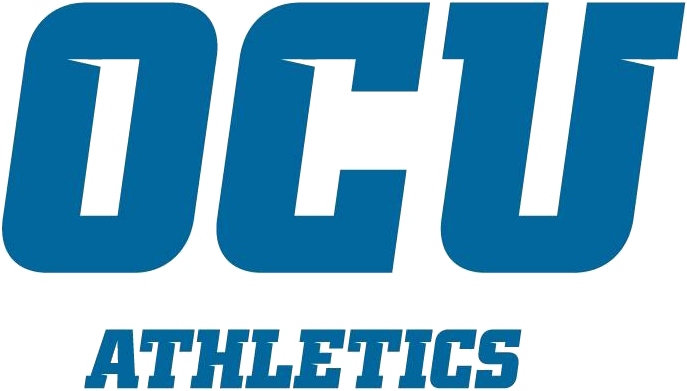

The Oklahoma City Stars are the athletic teams that represent Oklahoma City University, located in Oklahoma City, in the U.S. state of Oklahoma, in intercollegiate sports as a member of the National Association of Intercollegiate Athletics (NAIA), primarily competing in the Sooner Athletic Conference (SAC) for most of its sports since the 1985–86 academic year. The Stars previously competed at the NCAA Division I ranks, primarily competing in the Midwestern City Conference (MCC; now known as the Horizon League) from 1979–80 to 1984–85; in the D-I Trans America Athletic Conference (TAAC; now known as the Atlantic Sun Conference) during the 1978–79 school year, and as a Division I independent prior to that. Its women's wrestling team competed in the Women's College Wrestling Association (WCWA).

== Conference affiliations ==
NCAA

- Trans America Athletic Conference (Note: Now known as the Atlantic Sun Conference in 2001, and again since 2023.) – 1978–79
- Midwestern City Conference (Note: Later became the Midwestern Collegiate Conference until 2001; now known as the Horizon League since 2001.) – 1979–80 to 1984–85

NAIA

- Sooner Athletic Conference – 1985–86 to Present

== Varsity teams ==
OCU competes in 16 intercollegiate varsity sports:

Men's sports	Women's sports
Baseball	Basketball
Basketball	Cross country
Cross country	Golf
Golf	Rowing
Rowing	Soccer
Soccer	Softball
Track and field	Track and field
Wrestling	Volleyball

=== Men's basketball ===
Oklahoma City University has won 6 NAIA National Championships: 1991, 1992, 1994, 1996, 2007, 2008

Oklahoma City University has made 18 NAIA tournament appearances: 1987, 1991, 1992, 1993, 1994, 1995, 1996, 1998, 1999, 2000, 2001, 2002, 2003, 2004, 2005, 2006, 2007, 2008, 2010.

As a member of the NCAA, Oklahoma City University went to the NCAA tournament 11 times, the most of any school no longer a member of the NCAA (1952, 1953, 1954, 1955, 1956, 1957, 1963, 1964, 1965, 1966, 1973)

Oklahoma City University appeared in the NIT twice, in 1959 and 1968.

=== Baseball ===
The Stars won the 2005 NAIA National Championship.

Oklahoma City has had 71 Major League Baseball draft selections since the draft began in 1965.

Stars in the Major League Baseball Draft
Year	Player	Round	Team
1978	Bob Fiala	18	Royals
1979	William Ray	8	Astros
1982	Bob Gergen	10	Rangers
1983	John Cortez	32	Pirates
1983	Kerry Burns	13	Rangers
1984	Rodney Rush	3	Giants
1986	John Barfield	11	Rangers
1989	John Graves	39	Rangers
1989	Steve Avent	15	Phillies
1990	Joseph Frias	41	Indians
1990	Tony Scharff	36	Athletics
1990	Shawn Bryant	8	Indians
1991	Joseph Frias	40	Padres
1991	James Wynne	27	Expos
1991	John Coletti	18	Reds
1991	Chance Gledhill	18	Angels
1992	Clinton Whitworth	32	Phillies
1993	Adam Rodriguez	41	Tigers
1993	Pete Hartmann	9	Rangers
1993	Clinton Whitworth	9	Yankees
1994	Jeff Twist	23	Rockies
1994	Jon Valenti	15	Athletics
1995	Darren Loudermilk	15	Indians
1995	Rick Garcia	15	Marlins
1996	Jason Bohannon	55	Mets
1996	David Bleazard	22	Blue Jays
1999	Chris Baker	29	Blue Jays
1999	Matt Dehner	18	Reds
1999	Curt Gay	5	Indians
2000	Chris Schroder	46	Reds
2000	Freddy Sanchez	11	Red Sox
2001	Chris Schroder	19	Expos
2001	Mario Delgado	14	Phillies
2002	David Parker	43	Dodgers
2002	Keith Bohanan	23	Brewers
2002	Kennard Bibbs	14	Brewers
2003	Brandon Kaye	22	Padres
2003	Blake Hendley	11	Reds
2003	Matt Houston	11	Orioles
2003	Ben Himes	9	Reds
2004	E.J. Shanks	29	Padres
2004	Ted Ledbetter	23	Marlins
2004	Joey McLaughlin	18	Blue Jays
2004	Denver Kitch	13	Orioles
2004	Joe Bisenius	12	Phillies
2004	Grant Hansen	3	White Sox
2005	Tag Horner	41	Orioles
2005	Michael Mlotkowski	33	Yankees
2005	Colby Overstreet	27	Angels
2007	Brian Joynt	29	Padres
2007	Brandon Harrigan	23	Tigers
2007	Bobby Spain	19	Pirates
2007	Patrick Norris	16	Royals
2007	Kody Kaiser	15	Tigers
2008	Mike Lee	8	Red Sox
2009	Brent Weaver	26	Marlins
2009	Justin Harper	17	Astros
2009	Ashur Tolliver	5	Orioles
2010	Terrence Jackson	45	Mets
2011	Kirk Walker	26	Braves
2011	Ruben Sosa	23	Astros
2011	Ryan O'Sullivan	4	Dodgers
2012	Chad Carman	24	Phillies
2012	Miguel Beltran	19	Rays
2012	Blake Schwartz	17	Nationals
2012	Dane Phillips	2	Padres
2013	Cody Crabaugh	32	Marlins
2013	Chase Jensen	22	Padres
2014	Michael Nolan	18	Athletics
2014	Chris Pike	9	Rays
2014	Brad Wieck	7	Mets

=== Spirit squads ===
OCU fields a pom squad, a cheerleading squad, and a stunt team

OCU has won the NCA/NAIA National Invitational/Championships in the following years:

NCA: All-Girl NAIA: 2012, 2013 Small Coed NAIA: 2014, 2015, 2016 Large Coed NAIA: 2011, 2012, 2013, 2014

NAIA: Competitive Cheer Invitational: 2014 NAIA Competitive Cheer National Championship: 2017, 2021

OCU has won the National Dance Alliance Championships in the following divisions:

NDA NAIA Large: 2011, 2013

NDA NAIA Small: 2016

NDA Division III Hip Hop: 2016

OCU Dance won the NAIA Invitational in 2014

== Former sports ==
=== Football ===
Oklahoma City's football program and head coach Os Doenges made multiple innovative attempts to improving the game.

The first and most successful innovation was credited to opposing coach Dike Beede when the football team played in the 1941 Oklahoma City vs. Youngstown football game. This game marks the first American football game to use a penalty flag.

The second innovation was an unsuccessful venture to allow a coach to be on the field with the offense to help call plays and provide additional coaching as time allows.

== National championships ==
In 2012, Kevin Patrick Hardy (class of 2013) became OCU's first national champion in wrestling, taking the national title at 165 pounds. Hardy was a Division 1 three time state champion at Solon High School in Ohio.

Through the Spring 2012 sports season, Oklahoma City has won 49 national championships. Of these, 45 are NAIA championships, and four are WCWA championships.

Oklahoma City won the NACDA Director's Cup for the NAIA in 2002 and 2017, awarded annually to the college or university with the most success in collegiate athletics.

OCU has won national championships in the following sports (number of championships in parentheses, NAIA titles unless otherwise specified):

- Men's
  - Baseball (1) – 2005
  - Basketball (6) – 1991, 1992, 1994, 1996, 2007, 2008
  - Golf (10) – 2001, 2002, 2003, 2004, 2006, 2007, 2010, 2012, 2013, 2016, 2018, 2026
  - Tennis (4) – 1998, 1999, 2000, 2001

Total men's Championships: 21 (in 4 different men's team sports)

- Women's
  - Basketball (8) – 1988, 1999, 2000, 2001, 2002, 2012, 2014, 2015
  - Golf (8) – 2005, 2006, 2007, 2008, 2009, 2013, 2014, 2017
  - Softball (11) – 1994, 1995, 1996, 1997, 2000, 2001, 2002, 2007, 2016, 2017, 2022
  - Wrestling (4-WCWA) – 2009, 2010, 2011, 2012

Total women's championships: 31 (in 4 different women's team sports)

- Co-ed
  - Cheerleading (2) – 2017, 2021

Total coed championships: 2 (in 1 coed team sport)

== Nickname and mascot history ==
The school is currently known as the Stars, but was known as the Goldbugs or Gold Bugs in the 1920s, 30s and early 40s. From 1944, the university was known as the Chiefs a nickname changed in 1998 in reaction to the mounting pressure on schools to adopt names more sensitive to and respectful of Native American culture.
