= 1936 Navy Midshipmen football team =

American college football season

1936 Navy Midshipmen football
- Conference: Independent

Ranking
- AP: No. 18
- Record: 6–3
- Head coach: Tom Hamilton (3rd season)
- Captain: Rivers Morrell
- Home stadium: Thompson Stadium

1936 Southern college football independents records
	Conf.			Overall
Team	W	L	T	W		L		T
George Washington		–		7	–	1	–	1
Hardin–Simmons		–		9	–	2	–	0
Georgetown		–		6	–	2	–	1
Roanoke		–		6	–	2	–	1
Western Maryland		–		7	–	3	–	1
No. 18 Navy		–		6	–	3	–	0
Tampa		–		5	–	3	–	2
West Virginia		–		6	–	4	–	0
East Carolina		–		3	–	2	–	0
Catholic University		–		4	–	4	–	0
Jacksonville State		–		2	–	2	–	1
Oklahoma City		–		4	–	4	–	0
William & Mary Norfolk		–		4	–	4	–	0
Tennessee State		–		3	–	3	–	2
Oglethorpe		–		4	–	5	–	0
Texas Wesleyan		–		3	–	6	–	1
Troy State		–		3	–	6	–	0
Delaware		–		2	–	6	–	0
South Georgia Teachers		–		2	–	8	–	0
Rankings from AP Poll

The 1936 Navy Midshipmen football team represented the United States Naval Academy during the 1936 college football season. In their third season under head coach Tom Hamilton, the Midshipmen compiled a 6–3 record and outscored their opponents by a combined score of 115 to 74. They finished the season ranked 18th in the first year of the AP poll.

== Schedule ==
Date	Opponent	Site	Result	Attendance	Source
September 26	William & Mary	Thompson Stadium; Annapolis, MD	W 18–6	13,563	
October 3	Davidson	Thompson Stadium; Annapolis, MD	W 19–6		
October 10	Virginia	Thompson Stadium; Annapolis, MD	W 35–14	16,000	
October 17	Yale	Municipal Stadium; Baltimore, MD	L 7–12		
October 24	at Princeton	Palmer Stadium; Princeton, NJ	L 0–7	45,000	
October 31	at No. 20 Penn	Franklin Field; Philadelphia, PA	L 6–16		
November 7	No. 13 Notre Dame	Municipal Stadium; Baltimore, MD (rivalry)	W 3–0	51,126–57,500	
November 14	at Harvard	Harvard Stadium; Boston, MA	W 20–13	42,000	
November 28	vs. Army	Philadelphia Municipal Stadium; Philadelphia, PA (Army–Navy Game)	W 7–0		
Rankings from AP Poll released prior to the game
