= 1936 South Georgia Teachers Blue Tide football team =

American college football season

1936 South Georgia Teachers Blue Tide football
- Conference: Independent
- Record: 2–8
- Head coach: Crook Smith (8th season)

1936 Southern college football independents records
	Conf.			Overall
Team	W	L	T	W		L		T
George Washington		–		7	–	1	–	1
Hardin–Simmons		–		9	–	2	–	0
Georgetown		–		6	–	2	–	1
Roanoke		–		6	–	2	–	1
Western Maryland		–		7	–	3	–	1
No. 18 Navy		–		6	–	3	–	0
Tampa		–		5	–	3	–	2
West Virginia		–		6	–	4	–	0
East Carolina		–		3	–	2	–	0
Catholic University		–		4	–	4	–	0
Jacksonville State		–		2	–	2	–	1
Oklahoma City		–		4	–	4	–	0
William & Mary Norfolk		–		4	–	4	–	0
Tennessee State		–		3	–	3	–	2
Oglethorpe		–		4	–	5	–	0
Texas Wesleyan		–		3	–	6	–	1
Troy State		–		3	–	6	–	0
Delaware		–		2	–	6	–	0
South Georgia Teachers		–		2	–	8	–	0
Rankings from AP Poll

The 1936 South Georgia Teachers Blue Tide football team represented the South Georgia Teachers College—now known as Georgia Southern University—during the 1936 college football season. The team was led by Crook Smith in his eighth year as head coach.

== Schedule ==
Date	Time	Opponent	Site	Result	Attendance	Source
September 18	8:15 p.m.	at Mercer	Centennial Stadium; Macon, GA	L 0–40	2,000	
September 25	8:00 p.m.	at Miami (FL)	Miami Stadium; Miami, FL	L 0–44	4,000	
October 2	9:00 p.m.	at Troy State	Pace Field; Troy, AL	L 0–14		
October 9	8:00 p.m.	at Stetson	Hulley Field; DeLand, FL	L 0–12		
October 17		Tampa	Statesboro, GA	L 0–27		
October 24		at Appalachian State	College Field; Boone, NC (rivalry)	L 0–27		
October 31		Middle Georgia	Statesboro, GA	W 14–7		
November 7		Gordon (GA)	Statesboro, GA	L 7–13		
November 14		Brewton–Parker	Statesboro, GA	W 12–7		
November 26		Newberry	Statesboro, GA	L 9–13		
All times are in Eastern time
