= 1936 George Washington Colonials football team =

American college football season

1936 George Washington Colonials football
- Conference: Independent
- Record: 7–1–1
- Head coach: Jim Pixlee (8th season)
- Home stadium: Griffith Stadium

1936 Southern college football independents records
	Conf.			Overall
Team	W	L	T	W		L		T
George Washington		–		7	–	1	–	1
Hardin–Simmons		–		9	–	2	–	0
Georgetown		–		6	–	2	–	1
Roanoke		–		6	–	2	–	1
Western Maryland		–		7	–	3	–	1
No. 18 Navy		–		6	–	3	–	0
Tampa		–		5	–	3	–	2
West Virginia		–		6	–	4	–	0
East Carolina		–		3	–	2	–	0
Catholic University		–		4	–	4	–	0
Jacksonville State		–		2	–	2	–	1
Oklahoma City		–		4	–	4	–	0
William & Mary Norfolk		–		4	–	4	–	0
Tennessee State		–		3	–	3	–	2
Oglethorpe		–		4	–	5	–	0
Texas Wesleyan		–		3	–	6	–	1
Troy State		–		3	–	6	–	0
Delaware		–		2	–	6	–	0
South Georgia Teachers		–		2	–	8	–	0
Rankings from AP Poll

The 1936 George Washington Colonials football team was an American football team that represented George Washington University as an independent during the 1936 college football season. In its eighth season under head coach Jim Pixlee, the team compiled a 7–1–1 record and outscored opponents by a total of 175 to 38. The team defeated Arkansas, Wake Forest, and West Virginia, tied with Ole Miss, and lost to Rice.

== Schedule ==
Date	Opponent	Site	Result	Attendance	Source
September 25	Emory & Henry	Griffith Stadium; Washington, DC	W 27–0		
October 2	Elon	Griffith Stadium; Washington, DC	W 39–0	8,000	
October 9	Ole Miss	Griffith Stadium; Washington, DC	T 0–0		
October 16	Arkansas	Griffith Stadium; Washington, DC	W 13–6	16,000	
October 23	Wake Forest	Griffith Stadium; Washington, DC	W 13–12	18,000–22,000	
October 31	at Rice	Rice Field; Houston, TX	L 6–12		
November 7	Davis & Elkins	Griffith Stadium; Washington, DC	W 20–6		
November 14	Catawba	Griffith Stadium; Washington, DC	W 50–0		
November 26	West Virginia	Griffith Stadium; Washington, DC	W 7–2	20,000	

== Players ==
- Lou Carroll, back
- Bob Faris, end
- George Jenkins
- Joey Kaufman, triple-threat halfback, Salisbury, NC
- Frank Kavalier, captain and center
- Jay Kenslow
- Dale Prather, tackle, 210 pounds
- Herb Reeves, back, senior
- Vic Sampson, halfback, sophomore, 150 pounds
- Howard "Nig" Tihila, back and punter, 200 pounds
- Jay Turner, fullback
