= Penalty marker =

A penalty marker may refer to:

- Penalty flag, a yellow cloth used by game officials in American football, lacrosse, and several other field sports to identify and sometimes mark the location of penalties that occur during regular play.
- Penalty mark or marker, the spot inside the penalty area of an association football pitch where a penalty kick is taken from.
