= 1936 The Citadel Bulldogs football team =

American college football season

1936 The Citadel Bulldogs football
- Conference: Southern Conference
- Record: 4–6 (0–4 SoCon)
- Head coach: Tatum Gressette (5th season)
- Home stadium: Johnson Hagood Stadium

1936 Southern Conference football standings
	Conf.					Overall
Team	W		L		T	W		L		T
No. 11 Duke $	7	–	0	–	0	9	–	1	–	0
North Carolina	6	–	1	–	0	8	–	2	–	0
Furman	4	–	1	–	0	7	–	2	–	0
VMI	4	–	2	–	0	6	–	4	–	0
Maryland	3	–	2	–	0	5	–	5	–	0
Clemson	3	–	3	–	0	5	–	5	–	0
Davidson	4	–	3	–	0	5	–	4	–	0
Washington and Lee	2	–	2	–	0	4	–	5	–	0
Wake Forest	2	–	2	–	0	5	–	4	–	0
NC State	2	–	4	–	0	3	–	7	–	0
VPI	4	–	5	–	0	5	–	5	–	0
South Carolina	2	–	5	–	0	5	–	7	–	0
Richmond	1	–	3	–	0	4	–	4	–	2
Virginia	1	–	5	–	0	2	–	7	–	0
The Citadel	0	–	4	–	0	4	–	6	–	0
William & Mary	0	–	5	–	0	1	–	8	–	0
$ – Conference champion; Rankings from AP Poll

1936 Southern Intercollegiate Athletic Association football standings
	Conf.					Overall
Team	W		L		T	W		L		T
Middle Tennessee State Teachers +	4	–	0	–	0	7	–	1	–	0
The Citadel +	4	–	0	–	0	4	–	6	–	0
Miami (FL)	3	–	0	–	0	6	–	2	–	2
Centenary	2	–	0	–	0	6	–	4	–	2
Centre	2	–	0	–	0	5	–	4	–	0
Howard (AL)	2	–	0	–	1	5	–	3	–	1
Union (TN)	5	–	1	–	1	6	–	4	–	1
Rollins	4	–	1	–	0	7	–	1	–	0
Louisiana Tech	4	–	1	–	1	6	–	2	–	1
Morehead State	4	–	1	–	2	4	–	1	–	2
Eastern Kentucky	4	–	2	–	0	7	–	2	–	0
Mississippi State Teachers	4	–	2	–	1	7	–	2	–	1
Mississippi College	2	–	1	–	1	5	–	3	–	1
Western Kentucky State Teachers	3	–	2	–	0	6	–	3	–	0
Erskine	3	–	2	–	0	4	–	5	–	0
Presbyterian	3	–	2	–	0	3	–	6	–	0
Louisiana Normal	3	–	2	–	1	5	–	4	–	1
Murray State	4	–	4	–	0	5	–	4	–	0
Mercer	1	–	1	–	1	3	–	6	–	1
Louisiana College	2	–	3	–	1	3	–	4	–	1
Louisville	2	–	3	–	0	4	–	4	–	0
Millsaps	1	–	2	–	2	3	–	5	–	2
Transylvania	1	–	3	–	1	3	–	4	–	1
Tennessee Tech	1	–	5	–	0	2	–	5	–	1
Georgetown (KY)	1	–	5	–	1	2	–	5	–	1
Loyola (LA)	0	–	1	–	0	4	–	6	–	0
Stetson	0	–	3	–	1	2	–	5	–	1
Union (KY)	0	–	3	–	2	2	–	4	–	2
SW Louisiana	0	–	4	–	1	2	–	7	–	1
Wofford	0	–	4	–	1	1	–	7	–	1
Newberry	0	–	4	–	1	1	–	10	–	1
West Tennessee State Teachers	0	–	7	–	0	0	–	9	–	0
+ – Conference co-champions

The 1936 The Citadel Bulldogs football team represented The Citadel, The Military College of South Carolina in the 1936 college football season. Tatum Gressette served as head coach for the fifth season. The Bulldogs played home games at Johnson Hagood Stadium. The 1936 season marked the Bulldogs' first year as members of the Southern Conference.

== Schedule ==
Date	Opponent	Site	Result	Attendance	Source
September 19	Newberry	Johnson Hagood Stadium; Charleston, SC	W 33–0		
September 26	Erskine	Johnson Hagood Stadium; Charleston, SC	W 13–6		
October 3	at Florida*	Florida Field; Gainesville, FL	L 14–20	5,000	
October 10	at Furman	Sirrine Stadium; Greenville, SC (rivalry)	L 7–13	6,000	
October 17	at Presbyterian	Bailey Stadium; Clinton, SC	W 25–0		
October 24	at Davidson	Richardson Field; Davidson, NC	L 0–21	6,000	
October 30	vs. South Carolina	County Fairgrounds; Orangeburg, SC	L 0–9	6,000	
November 7	Clemson	Johnson Hagood Stadium; Charleston, SC	L 0–20	5,000	
November 14	Chattanooga*	Johnson Hagood Stadium; Charleston, SC	L 0–13		
November 26	vs. Wofford	Augusta, GA (rivalry)	W 41–0	4,000	
*Non-conference game
