= 1936 South Carolina Gamecocks football team =

American college football season

1936 South Carolina Gamecocks football
- Conference: Southern Conference
- Record: 5–7 (2–5 SoCon)
- Head coach: Don McCallister (2nd season)
- Captain: Bob Johnson
- Home stadium: Carolina Municipal Stadium

1936 Southern Conference football standings
	Conf.					Overall
Team	W		L		T	W		L		T
No. 11 Duke $	7	–	0	–	0	9	–	1	–	0
North Carolina	6	–	1	–	0	8	–	2	–	0
Furman	4	–	1	–	0	7	–	2	–	0
VMI	4	–	2	–	0	6	–	4	–	0
Maryland	3	–	2	–	0	5	–	5	–	0
Clemson	3	–	3	–	0	5	–	5	–	0
Davidson	4	–	3	–	0	5	–	4	–	0
Washington and Lee	2	–	2	–	0	4	–	5	–	0
Wake Forest	2	–	2	–	0	5	–	4	–	0
NC State	2	–	4	–	0	3	–	7	–	0
VPI	4	–	5	–	0	5	–	5	–	0
South Carolina	2	–	5	–	0	5	–	7	–	0
Richmond	1	–	3	–	0	4	–	4	–	2
Virginia	1	–	5	–	0	2	–	7	–	0
The Citadel	0	–	4	–	0	4	–	6	–	0
William & Mary	0	–	5	–	0	1	–	8	–	0
$ – Conference champion; Rankings from AP Poll

The 1936 South Carolina Gamecocks football team was an American football team that represented the University of South Carolina as a member of the Southern Conference (SoCon) during the 1936 college football season. In their second season under head coach Don McCallister, the Gamecocks compiled an overall record of 5–7 with a mark of 2–5 in conference play, placing 12th in the SoCon.

== Schedule ==
Date	Opponent	Site	Result	Attendance	Source
September 19	Erskine*	Carolina Municipal Stadium; Columbia, SC	W 38–0	8,000	
September 26	at VMI	Alumni Field; Lexington, VA	L 7–24	3,000	
October 3	Duke	Carolina Municipal Stadium; Columbia, SC	L 0–21	10,000	
October 10	Florida*	Carolina Municipal Stadium; Columbia, SC	W 7–0	4,000	
October 17	VPI	Carolina Municipal Stadium; Columbia, SC	W 14–0	6,000	
October 22	Clemson	Carolina Municipal Stadium; Columbia, SC (rivalry)	L 0–19	19,000	
October 30	vs. The Citadel	County Fairgrounds; Orangeburg, SC	W 9–0	6,000	
November 7	Villanova*	Carolina Municipal Stadium; Columbia, SC	L 0–14	4,000	
November 14	at Furman	Sirrine Stadium; Greenville, SC	L 6–23		
November 21	North Carolina	Carolina Municipal Stadium; Columbia, SC (rivalry)	L 0–14	18,000	
November 26	at Xavier*	Corcoran Stadium; Cincinnati, OH	L 13–21	6,500	
December 11	at Miami (FL)*	Miami Stadium; Miami, FL	W 6–3		
*Non-conference game
