= 1936 William & Mary Norfolk Division Braves football team =

American college football season

1936 William & Mary Norfolk Division Braves football
- Conference: Independent
- Record: 4–4
- Head coach: Tommy Scott (7th season)

1936 Southern college football independents records
	Conf.			Overall
Team	W	L	T	W		L		T
George Washington		–		7	–	1	–	1
Hardin–Simmons		–		9	–	2	–	0
Georgetown		–		6	–	2	–	1
Roanoke		–		6	–	2	–	1
Western Maryland		–		7	–	3	–	1
No. 18 Navy		–		6	–	3	–	0
West Virginia		–		6	–	4	–	0
East Carolina		–		3	–	2	–	0
Jacksonville State		–		2	–	2	–	1
Catholic University		–		4	–	4	–	0
Oklahoma City		–		4	–	4	–	0
William & Mary Norfolk		–		4	–	4	–	0
Oglethorpe		–		4	–	5	–	0
Texas Wesleyan		–		3	–	6	–	1
Troy State		–		3	–	6	–	0
Delaware		–		2	–	6	–	0
South Georgia Teachers		–		2	–	8	–	0
Rankings from AP Poll

The 1936 William & Mary Norfolk Division Braves football team represented the Norfolk Division of the College of William & Mary, now referred to as Old Dominion University, during the 1936 college football season. They finished with a 4–4 record.

== Schedule ==
Date	Opponent	Site	Result	Source
October 2	South Norfolk High School (VA)	Norfolk, VA	W 21–0	
October 10	Louisburg	Norfolk, VA	W 13–8	
October 17	Shenandoah	Norfolk, VA	L 0-8	
October 24	Gallaudet	Washington, DC	W 16–15	
October 31	East Carolina	Greenville, NC	L 0–25	
November 7	Apprentice	Norfolk, VA	L 0–25	
November 13	Norfolk NAS	Norfolk, VA	W 7–6	
November 20	William & Mary freshmen	Norfolk, VA	L 0–15	
