= 1936 NC State Wolfpack football team =

American college football season

1936 NC State Wolfpack football
- Conference: Southern Conference
- Record: 3–7 (2–4 SoCon)
- Head coach: Hunk Anderson (3rd season)
- Home stadium: Riddick Stadium

1936 Southern Conference football standings
	Conf.					Overall
Team	W		L		T	W		L		T
No. 11 Duke $	7	–	0	–	0	9	–	1	–	0
North Carolina	6	–	1	–	0	8	–	2	–	0
Furman	4	–	1	–	0	7	–	2	–	0
VMI	4	–	2	–	0	6	–	4	–	0
Maryland	3	–	2	–	0	5	–	5	–	0
Clemson	3	–	3	–	0	5	–	5	–	0
Davidson	4	–	3	–	0	5	–	4	–	0
Washington and Lee	2	–	2	–	0	4	–	5	–	0
Wake Forest	2	–	2	–	0	5	–	4	–	0
NC State	2	–	4	–	0	3	–	7	–	0
VPI	4	–	5	–	0	5	–	5	–	0
South Carolina	2	–	5	–	0	5	–	7	–	0
Richmond	1	–	3	–	0	4	–	4	–	2
Virginia	1	–	5	–	0	2	–	7	–	0
The Citadel	0	–	4	–	0	4	–	6	–	0
William & Mary	0	–	5	–	0	1	–	8	–	0
$ – Conference champion; Rankings from AP Poll

The 1936 NC State Wolfpack football team was an American football team that represented North Carolina State University as a member of the Southern Conference (SoCon) during the 1936 college football season. In its third and final season under head coach Hunk Anderson, the team compiled a 5–3–1 record (4–2–1 against SoCon opponents) and was outscored by a total of 84 to 79.

== Schedule ==
Date	Time	Opponent	Site	Result	Attendance	Source
September 19		Elon*	Riddick Stadium; Raleigh, NC	W 12–0	5,000	
September 26		Davidson	Riddick Stadium; Raleigh, NC	L 2–6	10,000	
October 3		Wake Forest	Riddick Stadium; Raleigh, NC (rivalry)	L 0–9	10,000	
October 9		at Manhattan*	Ebbets Field; Brooklyn, NY	L 6–13	20,000	
October 17		Furman	Riddick Stadium; Raleigh, NC	W 27–0	7,500	
October 24	2:30 p.m.	VPI	Riddick Stadium; Raleigh, NC	W 13–0	7,500	
October 31		at North Carolina	Kenan Memorial Stadium; Chapel Hill, NC (rivalry)	L 6–21	18,000	
November 7		at Boston College*	Fenway Park; Boston, MA	L 3–7	10,000	
November 14		at Catholic University*	Brookland Stadium; Washington, DC	L 6–7	8,500	
November 26		at No. 11 Duke	Duke Stadium; Durham, NC (rivalry)	L 0–13	17,320	
*Non-conference game; Rankings from AP Poll released prior to the game
