= Os Doenges =

American football player and coach (1905–1987)

Biographical details
- Born: October 18, 1905; Whiteside County, Illinois, U.S.
- Died: March 1987 (aged 81); Guthrie, Oklahoma, U.S.

Playing career
- 1927: Oklahoma City
- Position: Tackle

Coaching career (HC unless noted)
- 1938–1941: Oklahoma City
- 1942: Northwestern State (OK)
- 1949–1952: Sterling

Administrative career (AD unless noted)
- 1949–1953: Sterling

Head coaching record
- Overall: 19–59–8

H. Oswald "Os" Doenges (October 18, 1905 – March 1987) was an American football player and coach. He served as the head football coach at Oklahoma City University from 1938 to 1941, Northwestern State College—now known as Northwestern Oklahoma State University—in Alva, Oklahoma in 1942, and Sterling College in Sterling, Kansas from 1949 to 1952. Doenges was known for his creativity in the sport with several attempts to improve the game by making it faster and more enjoyable to watch.

== Playing career ==
Doenges played at Oklahoma City University.

== Coaching career ==
=== Oklahoma City ===
After playing at Oklahoma City, Doenges was named head coach at his alma mater. While at Oklahoma City, he was involved in several creative steps toward growth in college football. The first was a success—as he worked with Dike Beede to test the use of the penalty flag by officials in the 1941 Oklahoma City vs. Youngstown football game.

His second innovation was an unsuccessful venture to allow a coach to be on the field with the offense to help call plays and provide additional coaching as time allows. Doenges proposed tests with opposing coaches and at least two agreed to test the idea. However, the concept itself was considered a success and rules changes eventually allowed coaches on the sidelines to call plays and send plays in with a substitute.

Doenges is credited with inventing the offensive V formation, nicknamed "Three dots and a dash" (Morse code for the letter "v"). His Oklahoma City program presented the new offensive formation to great fanfare before losing to the Southwestern Moundbuilders by a score of 7–0.

Doenges was able to achieve a national ranking for his football team at Oklahoma City.

=== Sterling ===
Doenges was the head football coach at Sterling College in Sterling, Kansas for four seasons, from 1949 until 1952. His coaching record at Sterling was 5–30–2. While at Sterling, he helped organize a charity basketball game for a former athlete who had polio.

== Politics ==
While a high school civics teacher and football coach at Hugo High School in 1935, Doenges taught his classes that then-United States President Franklin D. Roosevelt and his New Deal were just an introduction to Communism. After finishing his coaching work, Doenges ran for the United States Senate.

== Head coaching record ==
Year	Team	Overall	Conference	Standing	Bowl/playoffs
Oklahoma City Goldbugs (Independent) (1938–1940)
1938	Oklahoma City	2–8			
1939	Oklahoma City	4–4–2			
1940	Oklahoma City	1–7–3			
Oklahoma City Goldbugs (Oklahoma Collegiate Conference) (1941)
1941	Oklahoma City	5–7	2–3	T–4th	
Oklahoma City:		12–27–5	2–3		
Northwestern State Rangers (Oklahoma Collegiate Conference) (1942)
1942	Northwestern State	2–2–1			
Northwestern State:		2–2–1			
Sterling Warriors (Independent) (1949–1952)
1949	Sterling	1–8			
1950	Sterling	2–8			
1951	Sterling	1–8–1			
1952	Sterling	1–6–1			
Sterling:		5–30–2			
Total:		19–59–8			
