= 1936 VPI Gobblers football team =

American college football season

1936 VPI Gobblers football
- Conference: Southern Conference
- Record: 5–5 (3–5 SoCon)
- Head coach: Henry Redd (5th season)
- Captain: Dave Jones
- Home stadium: Miles Stadium

1936 Southern Conference football standings
	Conf.					Overall
Team	W		L		T	W		L		T
No. 11 Duke $	7	–	0	–	0	9	–	1	–	0
North Carolina	6	–	1	–	0	8	–	2	–	0
Furman	4	–	1	–	0	7	–	2	–	0
VMI	4	–	2	–	0	6	–	4	–	0
Maryland	3	–	2	–	0	5	–	5	–	0
Clemson	3	–	3	–	0	5	–	5	–	0
Davidson	4	–	3	–	0	5	–	4	–	0
Washington and Lee	2	–	2	–	0	4	–	5	–	0
Wake Forest	2	–	2	–	0	5	–	4	–	0
NC State	2	–	4	–	0	3	–	7	–	0
VPI	4	–	5	–	0	5	–	5	–	0
South Carolina	2	–	5	–	0	5	–	7	–	0
Richmond	1	–	3	–	0	4	–	4	–	2
Virginia	1	–	5	–	0	2	–	7	–	0
The Citadel	0	–	4	–	0	4	–	6	–	0
William & Mary	0	–	5	–	0	1	–	8	–	0
$ – Conference champion; Rankings from AP Poll

The 1936 VPI Gobblers football team represented Virginia Agricultural and Mechanical College and Polytechnic Institute, now known as Virginia Tech, in the 1936 college football season. The team was led by their head coach Henry Redd and finished with a record of five wins and five losses (5–5). It finished with a 3–5 record in the Southern Conference. The Gobblers were shut out in all five of the games they lost. The team was 3-0 on its home field, Miles Stadium. It won three of its last four games, finishing the year beating arch-rival Virginia 7–6 at home, and winning the annual Thanksgiving Day contest against VMI at Maher Field in Roanoke.

== Schedule ==
Date	Time	Opponent	Site	Result	Attendance	Source
September 19		Roanoke*	Miles Stadium; Blacksburg, VA	W 16–7	3,500	
September 26	3:00 p.m.	at Clemson	Riggs Field; Calhoun, SC	L 0–20	5,000–6,000	
October 3		vs. Maryland	Maher Field; Roanoke, VA	L 0–6	2,500	
October 10		vs. William & Mary	City Stadium; Richmond, VA	W 14–0	8,000	
October 17		at South Carolina	Columbia Municipal Stadium; Columbia, SC	L 0–14	6,000	
October 24	2:30 p.m.	at NC State	Riddick Stadium; Raleigh, NC	L 0–13	7,000–7,500	
October 31		Richmond	Miles Stadium; Blacksburg, VA	W 20–7		
November 7		at Washington and Lee	Wilson Field; Lexington, VA	L 0–27	5,000	
November 14		Virginia*^{†}	Miles Stadium; Blacksburg, VA (rivalry)	W 7–6		
November 26	2:15 p.m.	vs. VMI	Maher Field; Roanoke, VA (rivalry)	W 6–0	17,000	
*Non-conference game; ^{†}Homecoming; All times are in Eastern time

== Before the season ==
The 1935 VPI Gobblers football team compiled a 4–3–2 record and were led by Henry Redd in his fourth season as head coach.

== Game summaries ==
=== Roanoke ===
Roanoke at VPI

Team	1	2	3	4	Total
Roanoke	0	0	0	7	7
• VPI	10	6	0	0	16

- Date: September 19, 1936
- Location: Miles Stadium
  Blacksburg, VA
- Game attendance: 3,500
- Game weather: "boiling Mid-September sun"
- Referee: Henry Gerard (Illinois)

VPI's first game of the season was a victory over Roanoke at Miles Stadium.

The starting lineup for VPI was: Shockey (left end), Vecellio (left tackle), Ingles (left guard), Murray (center), Piland (right guard), A. Robison (right tackle), Doxey (right end), Jones (quarterback), Henry (left halfback), Sodaro (right halfback), A. Miller (fullback). The substitutes were: Cregger and Dickerson.

The starting lineup for Roanoke was: Paul Miller (left end), George Pitzer (left tackle), Vic Cotter (left guard), Alex Schwartz (center), Larry Larson (right guard), Carey Brewbaker (right tackle), Conley Snidow (right end), John Pitzer (quarterback), Charles Myrtle (left halfback), Gregory Wroniewicz (right halfback), Bernard Pedneau (fullback). The substitutes were: Curry, Kenneth Moore and Stanley Snidow.

=== Clemson ===
VPI at Clemson

Team	1	2	3	4	Total
VPI	0	0	0	0	0
• Clemson	0	0	13	7	20

- Date: September 26, 1936
- Location: Riggs Field
  Calhoun, SC
- Game start: 3:00 p.m.
- Game attendance: 5,000–6,000
- Referee: Richard Carrington (UVA)

After their victory over Roanoke, VPI played Clemson College at Riggs Field in Calhoun, South Carolina.

The starting lineup for VPI was: Shockey (left end), A. Robison (left tackle), Ingles (left guard), Murray (center), Piland (right guard), Vecellio (right tackle), Doxey (right end), Jones (quarterback), Brown (left halfback), Henry (right halfback), Miller (fullback). The substitutes were: Cregger and Dickerson.

The starting lineup for Clemson was: Donald Shufford (left end), Manuel Black (left tackle), William Bryant (left guard), Harold Lewis (center), Lawrence Buscher (right guard), Wyser (right tackle), Samuel McConnell (right end), Joseph Berry (quarterback), Al Sanders (left halfback), Rudy Orban (right halfback), Mac Folger (fullback). The substitutes were: Boland and Winston Lawton.

=== Maryland ===
Maryland vs. VPI

Team	1	2	3	4	Total
• Maryland	0	0	6	0	6
VPI	0	0	0	0	0

- Date: October 3, 1936
- Location: Maher Field
  Roanoke, VA
- Game attendance: 2,500
- Referee: Dixon Foster

The starting lineup for VPI was: Shockey (left end), Vecellio (left tackle), Worthington (left guard), Jones (center), Piland (right guard), A. Robison (right tackle), Pierce (right end), Brown (quarterback), Henry (left halfback), Cregger (right halfback), Dickerson (fullback). The substitutes were: Banks, Devlin and Ingles.

The starting lineup for Maryland was: Victor G. Willis (left end), Edward Fletcher (left tackle), Michael Surgent (left guard), John DeArmey (center), William Wolfe (right guard), John Birkland (right tackle), Blair Smith (right end), Charles F. Ellinger (quarterback), Jim Meade (left halfback), Coleman Headley (right halfback), John Gormley (fullback). The substitutes were: Nick Budkoff, Edmond Daly, John Page, Robert Walton, Charles Weidinger and Waverly Wheeler.

=== William & Mary ===
William & Mary vs. VPI

Team	1	2	3	4	Total
W&M	0	0	0	0	0
• VPI	0	0	14	0	14

- Date: October 10, 1936
- Location: City Stadium
  Richmond, VA
- Game attendance: 8,000
- Referee: Richard Carrington (UVA)

The starting lineup for VPI was: Shockey (left end), Banks (left tackle), Piland (left guard), Jones (center), Worthington (right guard), A. Robison (right tackle), Doxey (right end), Brown (quarterback), Henry (left halfback), Cregger (right halfback), Dickerson (fullback). The substitutes were: Gaugler, Gee, Hearn, Ingles, Pierce and Sodaro.

The starting lineup for VPI was: Walter J. Zable (left end), Michael Hook (left tackle), Bill Davies (left guard), Hugh McGowan (center), Joe Marino (right guard), Samuel Walker (right tackle), John Coiner (right end), John Truehart (quarterback), Otis Bunch (left halfback), Arthur Woodward (right halfback), Herbert Krueger (fullback). The substitutes were: G. Bunch, Tommy Della Torre, Dick Dozier, Joe Flickenger, Walter Hadtke, Oscar Harper, Stan Kamen, Koss, Frank Livesay, Leo Mitkievicz, O'Hare, Smeltzer, Arthur Tanner, Alfred Tirelis and Joseph Zanghi.

=== South Carolina ===
VPI at South Carolina

Team	1	2	3	4	Total
VPI	0	0	0	0	0
• South Carolina	0	0	7	7	14

- Date: October 17, 1936
- Location: Columbia Municipal Stadium
  Columbia, SC
- Game attendance: 6,000
- Referee: Black (Davidson)

The starting lineup for VPI was: Doxey (left end), Banks (left tackle), Ingles (left guard), Jones (center), Piland (right guard), A. Robison (right tackle), Shockey (right end), Brown (quarterback), Henry (left halfback), Sodaro (right halfback), Dickerson (fullback).

The starting lineup for South Carolina was: Glen Myers (left end), Osgood Bramlet (left tackle), Ashley "Pat" Tobias (left guard), Frank Kiss (center), George Mackovic (right guard), Paul Robelot (right tackle), Larry Craig (right end), Burl Durham (quarterback), Jerry Hughes (left halfback), Jack Lyons (right halfback), Arthur Urbanyi (fullback). The substitutes were: Ed Clary, Ralph Dearth, Bob Johnson and Frank Urban.

=== NC State ===
VPI at NC State

Team	1	2	3	4	Total
VPI	0	0	0	0	0
• NC State	0	6	7	0	13

- Date: October 24, 1936
- Location: Riddick Stadium
  Raleigh, NC
- Game start: 2:30 p.m.
- Game attendance: 7,000–7,500
- Referee: Paul Magoffin

The starting lineup for VPI was: Pierce (left end), Vecellio (left tackle), Piland (left guard), Jones (center), Worthington (right guard), A. Robison (right tackle), Doxey (right end), Brown (quarterback), Henry (left halfback), Sodaro (right halfback), Dickerson (fullback).

The starting lineup for NC State was: Dom Cara (left end), Mason Bugg (left tackle), Alex Regdon (left guard), Lou Mark (center), Daniel Piloseno (right guard), George Fry (right tackle), Jess Tatum (right end), Charles Gadd (quarterback), Everett Robinson (left halfback), Edward Entwistle (right halfback), Joseph Ryneska (fullback). The substitutes were: Howard Bardes, Davis and Nick Hayden.

=== Richmond ===
Richmond at VPI

Team	1	2	3	4	Total
Richmond	0	7	0	0	7
• VPI	0	7	6	7	20

- Date: October 31, 1936
- Location: Miles Stadium
  Blacksburg, VA
- Referee: Paul Magoffin

The starting lineup for VPI was: Shockey (left end), A. Robison (left tackle), Piland (left guard), Jones (center), Worthington (right guard), Vecellio (right tackle), Doxey (right end), Henry (quarterback), Sodaro (left halfback), Brown (right halfback), J. Robison (fullback). The substitutes were: Cregger.

The starting lineup for Richmond was: Arthur Gore (left end), Charles Siddall (left tackle), Mike West (left guard), Ed Schaaf (center), J. Cornelius Godsey (right guard), Ames Harrington (right tackle), W. P. Lawless (right end), Leonard Kielpinski (quarterback), George Spears (left halfback), William Robertson (right halfback), Clyde Pendleton (fullback). The substitutes were: Avalon Marchant and Chalmers Walton.

=== Washington and Lee ===
VPI at Washington and Lee

Team	1	2	3	4	Total
VPI	0	0	0	0	0
• W&L	6	14	7	0	27

- Date: November 7, 1936
- Location: Wilson Field
  Lexington, VA
- Game attendance: 5,000
- Game weather: "a warm sun"
- Referee: O'Meara (Gonzaga)

The starting lineup for VPI was: Shockey (left end), A. Robison (left tackle), Piland (left guard), Murray (center), Worthington (right guard), Davis (right tackle), Doxey (right end), Sodaro (quarterback), Henry (left halfback), Cregger (right halfback), Brown (fullback). The substitutes were: Banks, Cameron, Devlin, Dickerson, Gee, Ingles, Jones, Mast, Pierce and Vecellio.

The starting lineup for Washington and Lee was: Frank Jones (left end), Alphonse Syzmanski (left tackle), William Brown (left guard), William Rogers (center), Duane Berry (right guard), Joseph Ochsie (right tackle), Bob Spessard (right end), Don Dunlap (quarterback), L. E. Long (left halfback), Preston Moore (right halfback), Wilton Sample (fullback). The substitutes were: S. R. Allen, Bill Borries, R. E. Craft, H. T. Dickinson, S. B. Harper, Howard, J. E. Lindsey, Charles Lykes, Howard Owings, S. R. Parrish and R. M. White.

=== Virginia ===
Virginia at VPI

Team	1	2	3	4	Total
Virginia	0	0	0	6	6
• VPI	0	0	7	0	7

- Date: November 14, 1936
- Location: Miles Stadium
  Blacksburg, VA
- Referee: Paul Magoffin

VPI's 1936 homecoming game was a victory over rival Virginia.

The starting lineup for VPI was: Pierce (left end), A. Robison (left tackle), Piland (left guard), Jones (center), Ingles (right guard), Banks (right tackle), Doxey (right end), Sodaro (quarterback), Henry (left halfback), Brown (right halfback), Dickerson (fullback). The substitutes were: Cregger, Gaugler, Murray and Vecellio.

The starting lineup for Virginia was: James Sargeant (left end), William Weeks (left tackle), Albert Reutlinger (left guard), Alfred Berkeley (center), Leonard Trell (right guard), Sanford Haskell (right tackle), Knox Turnbill (right end), Evan Male (quarterback), A. B. Connor (left halfback), John Acree (right halfback), Peter Nistad (fullback). The substitutes were: Harry Dinwiddie, Woody George, John Kegler, Thomas McCartin and Conway Moncure.

=== VMI ===
VMI vs. VPI

Team	1	2	3	4	Total
VMI	0	0	0	0	0
• VPI	6	0	0	0	6

- Date: November 26, 1936
- Location: Maher Field
  Roanoke, VA
- Game start: 2:15 p.m.
- Game attendance: 17,000
- Game weather: Cold
- Referee: Lane (Detroit)

The starting lineup for VPI was: Shockey (left end), Banks (left tackle), Ingles (left guard), Jones (center), Piland (right guard), A. Robison (right tackle), Doxey (right end), Sodaro (quarterback), Henry (left halfback), Cregger (right halfback), Miller (fullback).

The starting lineup for VMI was: Kane (left end), Gray (left tackle), William Echols (left guard), Richard Irby (center), Jim Farley (right guard), Richard Strickler (right tackle), Raymond Brittingham (right end), Andrew Trzeciak (quarterback), Billy Roberson (left halfback), Wayt Clark (right halfback), Joseph Ross (fullback). The substitutes were: Saunders and Taylor.

== After the season ==
In December 1936, the VPI players chose Carol Leo Shockey as captain of the 1937 VPI Gobblers football team.

=== NFL draft selections ===
Year	Round	Pick	Overall	Name	Team	Position
1937	7	3	63	Herman E. "Foots" Dickerson	Chicago Cardinals	End

== Players ==
=== Roster ===
VPI 1936 roster
Mac Banks; J. Wilson Brown; Pete Cregger; Junior Davis; Herman "Foots" Dickerson; Lloyd Doxey; Jim Gaugler; Everett W. Gee; Mel Henry; Bud Ingles; Dave Jones (Capt.)	Ruffner Murray; Malcolm O'Neale; Frank Pierce; Oscar "Flinky" Piland; Arthur Robison; Joseph O. Robison; Carol Shockey; George Sodaro; Leo Vecellio; George Worthington

=== Varsity letter winners ===
Nineteen players received varsity letters for their participation on the 1936 VPI team.

Player	Hometown	Notes
F. MacRae "Mac" Banks	Beckley, West Virginia	
J. Wilson Brown	Mount Ulla, North Carolina	
Marvin Andrew "Pete" Cregger	Cripple Creek, Virginia	World War II veteran (Lieutenant Colonel, Army).
James Blackwell "Junior" Davis	Fauquier County, Virginia	
Herman Edward "Foots" Dickerson	Reidsville, North Carolina	World War II veteran (Major, Army). First Virginia Tech player to chosen in the NFL draft.
Lloyd Gibbs Doxey	Halifax, North Carolina	World War II veteran (Army). Awarded the Bronze Star Medal and Purple Heart.
James Anthony Gaugler	Pittsburgh, Pennsylvania	
Melvin Henry	Cumberland, Maryland	
James Lewis "Bud" Ingles	Roanoke, Virginia	World War II veteran (Lieutenant Colonel, Army).
David R. Jones	Cambria, Virginia	
Ruffner Page Murray	Memphis, Tennessee	
Malcolm L. O'Neale	Charleston, West Virginia	
Frank Marion Pierce	Suffolk, Virginia	World War II veteran (Lieutenant Colonel, Army).
Oscar Glazier "Flinky" Piland	Suffolk, Virginia	World War II veteran (Lieutenant Colonel, Army).
Arthur Stephen Robison	Richmond, Virginia	World War II veteran (Army).
Carol Leo Shockey	Shockeysville, Virginia	
George Edward Sodaro	Charleston, West Virginia	World War II veteran (Tec 4, Army). Awarded the Bronze Star Medal.
Leo Arthur Vecellio	Beckley, West Virginia	World War II veteran (Army). Awarded the Legion of Merit.
George Yellott Worthington	Washington, DC	

== Coaching and training staff ==
- Head coach: Henry Redd
- Assistant coaches
  - Backfield coach: Herbert McEver
  - Line coach: Sumner D. Tilson
- Manager: Campbell
- Freshman coaches
  - Freshman head coach: C. E. Tilson
  - Assistant freshman coach: P. S. Hotchkiss
  - Assistant freshman coach: W. B. Porterfield
