= 1936 Washington and Lee Generals football team =

American college football season

1936 Washington and Lee Generals football
- Conference: Southern Conference
- Record: 4–5 (2–2 SoCon)
- Head coach: Warren E. Tilson (4th season)
- Home stadium: Wilson Field

1936 Southern Conference football standings
	Conf.					Overall
Team	W		L		T	W		L		T
No. 11 Duke $	7	–	0	–	0	9	–	1	–	0
North Carolina	6	–	1	–	0	8	–	2	–	0
Furman	4	–	1	–	0	7	–	2	–	0
VMI	4	–	2	–	0	6	–	4	–	0
Maryland	3	–	2	–	0	5	–	5	–	0
Clemson	3	–	3	–	0	5	–	5	–	0
Davidson	4	–	3	–	0	5	–	4	–	0
Washington and Lee	2	–	2	–	0	4	–	5	–	0
Wake Forest	2	–	2	–	0	5	–	4	–	0
NC State	2	–	4	–	0	3	–	7	–	0
VPI	4	–	5	–	0	5	–	5	–	0
South Carolina	2	–	5	–	0	5	–	7	–	0
Richmond	1	–	3	–	0	4	–	4	–	2
Virginia	1	–	5	–	0	2	–	7	–	0
The Citadel	0	–	4	–	0	4	–	6	–	0
William & Mary	0	–	5	–	0	1	–	8	–	0
$ – Conference champion; Rankings from AP Poll

The 1936 Washington and Lee Generals football team was an American football team that represented Washington and Lee University during the 1936 college football season as a member of the Southern Conference. In their fourth year under head coach Warren E. Tilson, the team compiled an overall record of 4–5 with a mark of 2–2 in conference play, and tying for eighth place in the SoCon.

== Schedule ==
Date	Opponent	Site	Result	Attendance	Source
September 26	Elon*	Wilson Field; Lexington, VA	W 27–0		
October 3	at Army*	Michie Stadium; West Point, NY	L 0–28	12,000	
October 10	vs. West Virginia*	Laidley Field; Charleston, WV	L 7–28	8,000	
October 17	Kentucky*	Wilson Field; Lexington, VA	L 7–39		
October 24	at Virginia	Scott Stadium; Charlottesville, VA	W 13–0	7,000	
October 31	vs. No. 13 Duke	City Stadium; Richmond, VA	L 0–51	6,691	
November 7	VPI	Wilson Field; Lexington, VA	W 27–0	5,000	
November 14	vs. William & Mary	Foreman Field; Norfolk, VA	W 13–7		
November 26	at Maryland	Municipal Stadium; Baltimore, MD	L 6–19	7,500	
*Non-conference game; Rankings from AP Poll released prior to the game
