= 1936 Wake Forest Demon Deacons football team =

American college football season

1936 Wake Forest Demon Deacons football
- Conference: Southern Conference
- Record: 5–4 (2–2 SoCon)
- Head coach: Jim Weaver (4th season)
- Captain: Ed Rogers
- Home stadium: Gore Field

1936 Southern Conference football standings
	Conf.					Overall
Team	W		L		T	W		L		T
No. 11 Duke $	7	–	0	–	0	9	–	1	–	0
North Carolina	6	–	1	–	0	8	–	2	–	0
Furman	4	–	1	–	0	7	–	2	–	0
VMI	4	–	2	–	0	6	–	4	–	0
Maryland	3	–	2	–	0	5	–	5	–	0
Clemson	3	–	3	–	0	5	–	5	–	0
Davidson	4	–	3	–	0	5	–	4	–	0
Washington and Lee	2	–	2	–	0	4	–	5	–	0
Wake Forest	2	–	2	–	0	5	–	4	–	0
NC State	2	–	4	–	0	3	–	7	–	0
VPI	4	–	5	–	0	5	–	5	–	0
South Carolina	2	–	5	–	0	5	–	7	–	0
Richmond	1	–	3	–	0	4	–	4	–	2
Virginia	1	–	5	–	0	2	–	7	–	0
The Citadel	0	–	4	–	0	4	–	6	–	0
William & Mary	0	–	5	–	0	1	–	8	–	0
$ – Conference champion; Rankings from AP Poll

The 1936 Wake Forest Demon Deacons football team was an American football team that represented Wake Forest University during the 1936 college football season. In its fourth season under head coach Jim Weaver, the team compiled a 5–4 record and finished in ninth place in the Southern Conference with a 2–2 record against conference opponents.

== Schedule ==
Date	Opponent	Site	Result	Attendance	Source
September 26	vs. North Carolina	American Legion Memorial Stadium; Charlotte, NC (rivalry)	L 7–14	11,000	
October 3	at NC State	Riddick Stadium; Raleigh, NC (rivalry)	W 9–0	10,000	
October 10	Wofford*	Gore Field; Wake Forest, NC	W 32–0	2,000	
October 16	Clemson	Gore Field; Wake Forest, NC	W 6–0	2,000	
October 23	at George Washington*	Griffith Stadium; Washington DC	L 12–13	18,000–22,000	
October 31	Presbyterian*	Gore Field; Wake Forest, NC	W 19–0	3,000	
November 7	No. 15 Duke	Gore Field; Wake Forest, NC (rivalry)	L 0–20	10,000	
November 13	Erskine*	Gore Field; Wake Forest, NC	W 19–6	2,000	
November 26	at Davidson	Richardson Field; Davidson, NC	L 6–19	11,000	
*Non-conference game; Rankings from AP Poll released prior to the game
