= 1936 North Carolina Tar Heels football team =

American college football season

1936 North Carolina Tar Heels football
- Conference: Southern Conference
- Record: 8–2 (6–1 SoCon)
- Head coach: Raymond Wolf (1st season)
- Captain: Dick Buck
- Home stadium: Kenan Memorial Stadium

1936 Southern Conference football standings
	Conf.					Overall
Team	W		L		T	W		L		T
No. 11 Duke $	7	–	0	–	0	9	–	1	–	0
North Carolina	6	–	1	–	0	8	–	2	–	0
Furman	4	–	1	–	0	7	–	2	–	0
VMI	4	–	2	–	0	6	–	4	–	0
Maryland	3	–	2	–	0	5	–	5	–	0
Clemson	3	–	3	–	0	5	–	5	–	0
Davidson	4	–	3	–	0	5	–	4	–	0
Washington and Lee	2	–	2	–	0	4	–	5	–	0
Wake Forest	2	–	2	–	0	5	–	4	–	0
NC State	2	–	4	–	0	3	–	7	–	0
VPI	4	–	5	–	0	5	–	5	–	0
South Carolina	2	–	5	–	0	5	–	7	–	0
Richmond	1	–	3	–	0	4	–	4	–	2
Virginia	1	–	5	–	0	2	–	7	–	0
The Citadel	0	–	4	–	0	4	–	6	–	0
William & Mary	0	–	5	–	0	1	–	8	–	0
$ – Conference champion; Rankings from AP Poll

The 1936 North Carolina Tar Heels football team represented the University of North Carolina at Chapel Hill during the 1936 college football season. The Tar Heels were led by first-year head coach Raymond Wolf and played their home games at Kenan Memorial Stadium. They competed as a member of the Southern Conference.

== Schedule ==
Date	Time	Opponent	Site	Result	Attendance	Source
September 26	2:30 p.m.	vs. Wake Forest	American Legion Memorial Stadium; Charlotte, NC (rivalry)	W 14–7	12,000	
October 3	2:30 p.m.	Tennessee*	Kenan Memorial Stadium; Chapel Hill, NC	W 14–6	15,000	
October 10	2:30 p.m.	Maryland	Kenan Memorial Stadium; Chapel Hill, NC	W 14–0	8,000	
October 17	2:30 p.m.	at NYU*	Yankee Stadium; Bronx, NY	W 14–13	10,000	
October 24	3:30 p.m.	at No. 18 Tulane*	Tulane Stadium; New Orleans, LA	L 7–21	18,000	
October 31	2:00 p.m.	NC State	Kenan Memorial Stadium; Chapel Hill, NC (rivalry)	W 21–6	18,000	
November 7	2:30 p.m.	at Davidson	Richardson Stadium; Davidson, NC	W 26–6	11,000	
November 14	2:00 p.m.	No. 13 Duke	Kenan Memorial Stadium; Chapel Hill, NC (rivalry)	L 7–27	35,000	
November 21	2:30 p.m.	at South Carolina	Columbia Municipal Stadium; Columbia, SC (rivalry)	W 14–0	18,000	
November 26	2:00 p.m.	at Virginia*	Scott Stadium; Charlottesville, VA (rivalry)	W 59–14	5,000	
*Non-conference game; Rankings from AP Poll released prior to the game; All times are in Eastern time
