= Spinner play =

American football play

A spinner play is a rushing trick play in American football, involving a spin move and a fake hand-off. Dike Beede and Pop Warner used it, as well as Hugo Bezdek. It is best run from the single wing formation.
