= 1936 Furman Purple Hurricane football team =

American college football season

1936 Furman Purple Hurricane football
- Conference: Southern Conference
- Record: 7–2 (4–1 SoCon)
- Head coach: Dizzy McLeod (5th season)
- Captain: Bob King
- Home stadium: Manly Field; Sirrine Stadium

1936 Southern Conference football standings
	Conf.					Overall
Team	W		L		T	W		L		T
No. 11 Duke $	7	–	0	–	0	9	–	1	–	0
North Carolina	6	–	1	–	0	8	–	2	–	0
Furman	4	–	1	–	0	7	–	2	–	0
VMI	4	–	2	–	0	6	–	4	–	0
Maryland	3	–	2	–	0	5	–	5	–	0
Clemson	3	–	3	–	0	5	–	5	–	0
Davidson	4	–	3	–	0	5	–	4	–	0
Washington and Lee	2	–	2	–	0	4	–	5	–	0
Wake Forest	2	–	2	–	0	5	–	4	–	0
NC State	2	–	4	–	0	3	–	7	–	0
VPI	4	–	5	–	0	5	–	5	–	0
South Carolina	2	–	5	–	0	5	–	7	–	0
Richmond	1	–	3	–	0	4	–	4	–	2
Virginia	1	–	5	–	0	2	–	7	–	0
The Citadel	0	–	4	–	0	4	–	6	–	0
William & Mary	0	–	5	–	0	1	–	8	–	0
$ – Conference champion; Rankings from AP Poll

The 1936 Furman Purple Hurricane football team was an American football team that represented Furman University as a member of the Southern Conference (SoCon) during the 1936 college football season . In their fifth year under head coach Dizzy McLeod, the team compiled an overall record of 7–2 with a mark of 4–1 in conference play, finishing in third place in the SoCon. Furman defeated Davidson, 14–13, on October 31, in the first game played at Sirrine Stadium.

== Schedule ==
Date	Opponent	Site	Result	Attendance	Source
September 26	at Wofford*	Snyder Field; Spartanburg, SC (rivalry)	W 31–0	4,000	
October 3	at Georgia*	Sanford Stadium; Athens, GA	L 0–13	4,001	
October 10	The Citadel	Manly Field; Greenville, SC (rivalry)	W 13–7	6,000	
October 17	at NC State	Riddick Stadium; Raleigh, NC	L 0–27	7,500	
October 23	Mercer*	Manly Field; Greenville, SC	W 20–9	6,000	
October 31	Davidson	Sirrine Stadium; Greenville, SC	W 14–13	9,000	
November 6	at Presbyterian*	Bailey Stadium; Clinton, SC	W 14–0	3,000	
November 14	South Carolina	Sirrine Stadium; Greenville, SC	W 23–6		
November 26	at Clemson	Riggs Field; Clemson, SC	W 12–0	12,000	
*Non-conference game
