= 1936 Richmond Spiders football team =

American college football season

1936 Richmond Spiders football
- Conference: Southern Conference
- Record: 4–4–2 (1–3 SoCon)
- Head coach: Glenn Thistlethwaite (3rd season)
- Captain: Micheal W. West
- Home stadium: City Stadium

1936 Southern Conference football standings
	Conf.					Overall
Team	W		L		T	W		L		T
No. 11 Duke $	7	–	0	–	0	9	–	1	–	0
North Carolina	6	–	1	–	0	8	–	2	–	0
Furman	4	–	1	–	0	7	–	2	–	0
VMI	4	–	2	–	0	6	–	4	–	0
Maryland	3	–	2	–	0	5	–	5	–	0
Clemson	3	–	3	–	0	5	–	5	–	0
Davidson	4	–	3	–	0	5	–	4	–	0
Washington and Lee	2	–	2	–	0	4	–	5	–	0
Wake Forest	2	–	2	–	0	5	–	4	–	0
NC State	2	–	4	–	0	3	–	7	–	0
VPI	4	–	5	–	0	5	–	5	–	0
South Carolina	2	–	5	–	0	5	–	7	–	0
Richmond	1	–	3	–	0	4	–	4	–	2
Virginia	1	–	5	–	0	2	–	7	–	0
The Citadel	0	–	4	–	0	4	–	6	–	0
William & Mary	0	–	5	–	0	1	–	8	–	0
$ – Conference champion; Rankings from AP Poll

The 1936 Richmond Spiders football team was an American football team that represented the University of Richmond as a member of the Southern Conference (SoCon) during the 1936 college football season. In their third season under head coach Glenn Thistlethwaite, Richmond compiled a 4–4–2 record, with a mark of 1–3 in conference play, finishing in 13th place in the SoCon.

== Schedule ==
Date	Opponent	Site	Result	Attendance	Source
September 21	at Apprentice*	Newport News, VA	W 6–0	4,000	
September 26	Randolph–Macon*	City Stadium; Richmond, VA	T 7–7		
October 3	Roanoke*	City Stadium; Richmond, VA	T 0–0		
October 10	at Franklin & Marshall*	Williamson Field; Lancaster, PA	L 0–13		
October 17	Emory and Henry*	City Stadium; Richmond, VA	W 20–6		
October 24	VMI	City Stadium; Richmond, VA (rivalry)	L 0–20		
October 31	at VPI	Miles Stadium; Blacksburg, VA	L 7–20		
November 7	Maryland	City Stadium; Richmond, VA	L 0–12	4,000	
November 14	Hampden–Sydney*	City Stadium; Richmond, VA	W 14–3		
November 26	William & Mary	City Stadium; Richmond, VA (rivalry)	W 7–0		
*Non-conference game
