= 1936 Clemson Tigers football team =

American college football season

1936 Clemson Tigers football
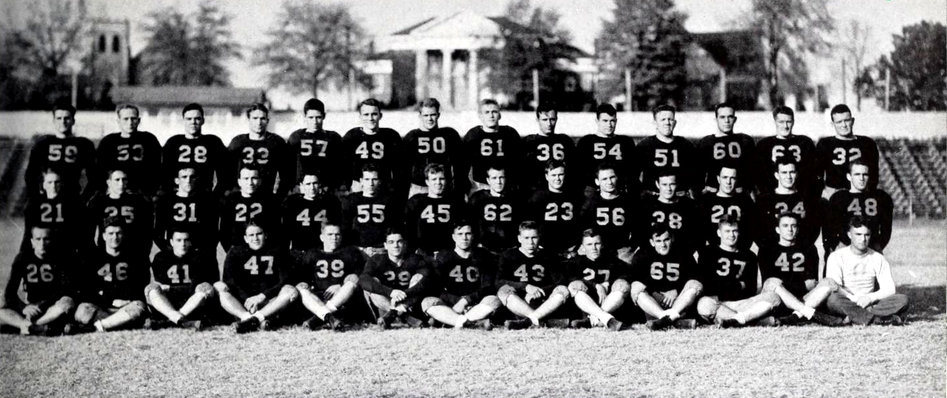
- Conference: Southern Conference
- Record: 5–5 (3–3 SoCon)
- Head coach: Jess Neely (6th season)
- Captain: Net Berry
- Home stadium: Riggs Field

1936 Southern Conference football standings
| | Conf. | | | | | Overall |
| Team | W | | L | | T | W | | L | | T |
|---|---|---|---|---|---|---|---|---|---|---|
| No. 11 Duke $ | 7 | – | 0 | – | 0 | 9 | – | 1 | – | 0 |
| North Carolina | 6 | – | 1 | – | 0 | 8 | – | 2 | – | 0 |
| Furman | 4 | – | 1 | – | 0 | 7 | – | 2 | – | 0 |
| VMI | 4 | – | 2 | – | 0 | 6 | – | 4 | – | 0 |
| Maryland | 3 | – | 2 | – | 0 | 5 | – | 5 | – | 0 |
| Clemson | 3 | – | 3 | – | 0 | 5 | – | 5 | – | 0 |
| Davidson | 4 | – | 3 | – | 0 | 5 | – | 4 | – | 0 |
| Washington and Lee | 2 | – | 2 | – | 0 | 4 | – | 5 | – | 0 |
| Wake Forest | 2 | – | 2 | – | 0 | 5 | – | 4 | – | 0 |
| NC State | 2 | – | 4 | – | 0 | 3 | – | 7 | – | 0 |
| VPI | 4 | – | 5 | – | 0 | 5 | – | 5 | – | 0 |
| South Carolina | 2 | – | 5 | – | 0 | 5 | – | 7 | – | 0 |
| Richmond | 1 | – | 3 | – | 0 | 4 | – | 4 | – | 2 |
| Virginia | 1 | – | 5 | – | 0 | 2 | – | 7 | – | 0 |
| The Citadel | 0 | – | 4 | – | 0 | 4 | – | 6 | – | 0 |
| William & Mary | 0 | – | 5 | – | 0 | 1 | – | 8 | – | 0 |
$ – Conference champion; Rankings from AP Poll

The 1936 Clemson Tigers football team was an American football team that represented Clemson College in the Southern Conference during the 1936 college football season. In their sixth season under head coach Jess Neely, the Tigers compiled a 5–5 record (3–3 against conference opponents), finished sixth in the conference, and outscored opponents by a total of 98 to 95.

Net Berry was the team captain. The team's statistical leaders included tailback Joe Berry with 434 passing yards and fullback Mac Folger with 522 rushing yards and 48 points scored (8 touchdowns).

Five Clemson players were selected as first-team players on the 1937 All-South Carolina football team: backs Joe Berry and Mac Folger; tackle Manuel Black; guard Bill Bryant; and center Harold Lewis.

== Schedule ==
| Date | Opponent | Site | Result | Attendance | Source |
|---|---|---|---|---|---|
| September 19 | Presbyterian* | Riggs Field; Clemson, SC | W 19–0 | 5,000 | |
| September 26 | VPI | Riggs Field; Clemson, SC | W 20–0 | 5,000 | |
| October 3 | at No. 4 Alabama | Denny Stadium; Tuscaloosa, AL (rivalry) | L 0–32 | 6,000 | |
| October 10 | at No. 11 Duke | Duke Stadium; Durham, NC | L 0–25 | 4,127 | |
| October 16 | at Wake Forest | Gore Field; Wake Forest, NC | L 0–6 | 2,000 | |
| October 22 | at South Carolina | Carolina Stadium; Columbia, SC (rivalry) | W 19–0 | 19,000 | |
| October 31 | at Georgia Tech* | Grant Field; Atlanta, GA (rivalry) | W 14–13 | 11,000 | |
| November 7 | at The Citadel | Johnson Hagood Stadium; Charleston, SC | W 20–0 | 5,000 | |
| November 14 | at Kentucky* | McLean Stadium; Lexington, KY | L 6–7 | | |
| November 26 | Furman | Riggs Field; Clemson, SC | L 0–12 | 12,000 | |
*Non-conference game; Rankings from AP Poll released prior to the game
