= Lyal Clark =

American football player and coach (1904–1971)

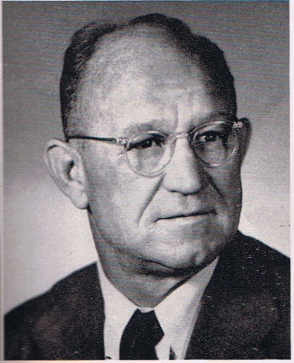
- Clark, c. 1958

Biographical details
- Born: July 4, 1904
- Died: January 30, 1971 (aged 66)

Playing career
- 1925–1928: Western Maryland
- Position(s): End

Coaching career (HC unless noted)
- 1935–1937: Delaware

Head coaching record
- Overall: 5–18–1

Lyal W. Clark (July 4, 1904 – January 30, 1971) was an American college football head coach who was Delaware football program's eighteenth head coach. He led them to a 5–18–1 overall record in three seasons.

Born in Nebraska, Clark was a multi-sport star athlete for the Western Maryland College Green Terror, playing as an end in football and coached by Dick Harlow. In 1927 he was invited to play in the East-West Shrine Game. Clark graduated in 1929 with a bachelor of arts degree and took his first coaching job that same year as football line coach at the University of Baltimore. By 1935, when he became head coach at Delaware, he had been an assistant football coach at Virginia Polytechnic Institute, Western Maryland, and Delaware.

Following his term as Blue Hen head coach, Clark returned to assistant coaching in 1938, joining the staff of The Harvard Crimson, coached by Harlow. Clark coached at Harvard until 1946, and was a factor in three Harvard victories over Yale University. From March 1943 to November 1945, when Harvard suspended its football program during World War II, Clark served as a lieutenant commander in the United States Navy, as an athletic instructor at the Naval Pre-Flight Training Center in Chapel Hill, North Carolina; at Lakehurst, New Jersey, and at Corpus Christi, Texas. He returned to Harvard at the end of the 1945 season as Harlow's general assistant.

In March 1946 Clark left Harvard to take a position on the staff of a former Harvard assistant, Wes Fesler, the new head football coach of the University of Pittsburgh. Clark followed Fesler to the Ohio State University when Fesler became the Buckeyes head coach the next year. Fesler resigned after the 1950 season, and Clark again accompanied him to another program, this time to the University of Minnesota in 1951.

When Fesler's successor, Woody Hayes, came under fire for not meeting program expectations in his first three years as Ohio State's head coach, OSU Athletic Director Dick Larkins hired Clark away from Minnesota and back to Columbus to coach the Buckeye defense. Hayes delegated Clark complete control of the defense, an uncharacteristic move at the time, and Clark's defense responded in 1954 by not allowing more than 14 points during any game in the season (and that only twice), surrendering only 75 points overall. This included a goal line stand inside the Buckeye one-yard line in the 4th quarter against Michigan on November 20 to preserve the victory and a perfect season. Ohio State went on to win the National Championship that season.

Clark served as defensive line coach at OSU for 16 years under Fesler and Hayes, the fourth longest tenure for an Ohio State assistant coach, which included championship teams in 1955, 1957, and 1961. He developed emphysema during this period and retired from Ohio State and coaching before the 1966 season. He died in 1971 after an extended two-year struggle with the disease. Clark was inducted in 1982 into the McDaniel College Sports Hall of Fame.

== Head coaching record ==
=== Football ===
Year	Team	Overall	Conference	Standing	Bowl/playoffs
Delaware Fightin' Blue Hens (Independent) (1935–1937)
1935	Delaware	2–5–1			
1936	Delaware	2–6			
1937	Delaware	1–7			
Delaware:		5–18–1			
Total:		5–18–1			
