= 1936 Maryland Terrapins football team =

American college football season

1936 Maryland Terrapins football
- Conference: Southern Conference
- Record: 6–5 (4–2 SoCon)
- Head coach: Frank Dobson (1st season)
- Home stadium: Byrd Stadium (original)

1936 Southern Conference football standings
| | Conf. | | | | | Overall |
| Team | W | | L | | T | W | | L | | T |
|---|---|---|---|---|---|---|---|---|---|---|
| No. 11 Duke $ | 7 | – | 0 | – | 0 | 9 | – | 1 | – | 0 |
| North Carolina | 6 | – | 1 | – | 0 | 8 | – | 2 | – | 0 |
| Furman | 4 | – | 1 | – | 0 | 7 | – | 2 | – | 0 |
| VMI | 4 | – | 2 | – | 0 | 6 | – | 4 | – | 0 |
| Maryland | 3 | – | 2 | – | 0 | 5 | – | 5 | – | 0 |
| Clemson | 3 | – | 3 | – | 0 | 5 | – | 5 | – | 0 |
| Davidson | 4 | – | 3 | – | 0 | 5 | – | 4 | – | 0 |
| Washington and Lee | 2 | – | 2 | – | 0 | 4 | – | 5 | – | 0 |
| Wake Forest | 2 | – | 2 | – | 0 | 5 | – | 4 | – | 0 |
| NC State | 2 | – | 4 | – | 0 | 3 | – | 7 | – | 0 |
| VPI | 4 | – | 5 | – | 0 | 5 | – | 5 | – | 0 |
| South Carolina | 2 | – | 5 | – | 0 | 5 | – | 7 | – | 0 |
| Richmond | 1 | – | 3 | – | 0 | 4 | – | 4 | – | 2 |
| Virginia | 1 | – | 5 | – | 0 | 2 | – | 7 | – | 0 |
| The Citadel | 0 | – | 4 | – | 0 | 4 | – | 6 | – | 0 |
| William & Mary | 0 | – | 5 | – | 0 | 1 | – | 8 | – | 0 |
$ – Conference champion; Rankings from AP Poll

The 1936 Maryland Terrapins football team was an American football team that represented the University of Maryland in the Southern Conference (SoCon) during the 1936 college football season. In their first season under head coach Frank Dobson, the Terrapins compiled a 6–5 record (4–2 against SoCon opponents), finished in a tie for fifth place in the SoCon, and outscored their opponents by a total of 117 to 59.

== Schedule ==
| Date | Opponent | Site | Result | Attendance | Source |
|---|---|---|---|---|---|
| September 26 | St. John's (MD)* | Byrd Stadium; College Park, MD | W 20–0 | 6,000 | |
| October 3 | vs. VPI | Mahar Field; Roanoke, VA | W 6–0 | 2,500 | |
| October 10 | at North Carolina | Kenan Memorial Stadium; Chapel Hill, NC | L 0–14 | 8,000 | |
| October 17 | at Virginia | Scott Stadium; Charlottesville, VA (rivalry) | W 21–0 | 6,000 | |
| October 24 | at Syracuse* | Archbold Stadium; Syracuse, NY | W 20–0 | 20,000 | |
| October 31 | at Florida* | Florida Field; Gainesville, FL | L 6–7 | 14,000 | |
| November 7 | at Richmond | City Stadium; Richmond, VA | W 12–0 | 4,000 | |
| November 14 | VMI | Byrd Stadium; College Park, MD | L 7–13 | 9,000 | |
| November 21 | Georgetown* | Byrd Stadium; College Park, MD | L 6–7 | 12,000 | |
| November 26 | vs. Washington and Lee | Municipal Stadium; Baltimore, MD | W 19–6 | 7,500 | |
| December 5 | Western Maryland* | Municipal Stadium; Baltimore, MD | L 0–12 | 15,000 | |
*Non-conference game
