= Bo Farley =

American football, basketball, and baseball coach

- Farley pictured in The Tecoan 1937, ECU yearbook

Biographical details
- Born: March 25, 1907; Danville, Virginia, U.S.
- Died: April 1, 1999 (aged 92); Greenville, North Carolina, U.S.

Coaching career (HC unless noted)

Football
- 1936: East Carolina

Basketball
- 1936–1937: East Carolina
- 1939–1940: East Carolina

Baseball
- 1935–1938: East Carolina
- 1940: East Carolina

Head coaching record
- Overall: 3–2 (football); 24–18 (basketball); 39–17–4 (baseball)

Roland "Bo" Farley (March 25, 1907 – April 1, 1999) was an American football, basketball, and baseball coach. He was the head football, basketball and baseball coach of the East Carolina Pirates at the East Carolina Teachers College, now known as East Carolina University. Farley was the head football coach from 1936, as well as the head basketball coach at East Carolina for two seasons, 1936–37 and 1939–40, and the school's head baseball coach for five seasons, from 1935 to 1938 and again in 1940.

== Head coaching record ==
=== Football ===
Year	Team	Overall	Conference	Standing	Bowl/playoffs
East Carolina Pirates (Independent) (1936)
1936	East Carolina	3–2			
East Carolina:		3–2			
Total:		3–2			
