= 1936 Virginia Cavaliers football team =

American college football season

1936 Virginia Cavaliers football
- Conference: Southern Conference
- Record: 2–7 (1–5 SoCon)
- Head coach: Gus Tebell (3rd season)
- Captains: Leonard Trell; Harry Martin
- Home stadium: Scott Stadium

1936 Southern Conference football standings
	Conf.					Overall
Team	W		L		T	W		L		T
No. 11 Duke $	7	–	0	–	0	9	–	1	–	0
North Carolina	6	–	1	–	0	8	–	2	–	0
Furman	4	–	1	–	0	7	–	2	–	0
VMI	4	–	2	–	0	6	–	4	–	0
Maryland	3	–	2	–	0	5	–	5	–	0
Clemson	3	–	3	–	0	5	–	5	–	0
Davidson	4	–	3	–	0	5	–	4	–	0
Washington and Lee	2	–	2	–	0	4	–	5	–	0
Wake Forest	2	–	2	–	0	5	–	4	–	0
NC State	2	–	4	–	0	3	–	7	–	0
VPI	4	–	5	–	0	5	–	5	–	0
South Carolina	2	–	5	–	0	5	–	7	–	0
Richmond	1	–	3	–	0	4	–	4	–	2
Virginia	1	–	5	–	0	2	–	7	–	0
The Citadel	0	–	4	–	0	4	–	6	–	0
William & Mary	0	–	5	–	0	1	–	8	–	0
$ – Conference champion; Rankings from AP Poll

The 1936 Virginia Cavaliers football team represented the University of Virginia during the 1936 college football season. The Cavaliers were led by third-year head coach Gus Tebell and played their home games at Scott Stadium in Charlottesville, Virginia. They competed as members of the Southern Conference, finishing with a conference record of 1–5 and a 2–7 record overall. Shortly after the season ended, Virginia decided to leave the Southern Conference in response to the conference's "Graham Plan" that prohibited sports scholarships. In February 1937, head coach Gus Tebell was replaced by former Marquette head coach Frank Murray. Tebell failed to produce a winning season in his three years at Virginia and had an overall record of 6–18–4. He remained at the school to coach the basketball and baseball teams.

== Schedule ==
Date	Time	Opponent	Site	Result	Attendance	Source
September 26		Hampden–Sydney*	Scott Stadium; Charlottesville, VA	W 26–10	5,000	
October 3	3:00 p.m.	vs. William & Mary	Foreman Field; Norfolk, VA	W 7–0	15,000	
October 10		at Navy*	Thompson Stadium; Annapolis, MD	L 14–35	16,000	
October 17		Maryland	Scott Stadium; Charlottesville, VA (rivalry)	L 0–21	6,000	
October 24		Washington and Lee^{†}	Scott Stadium; Charlottesville, VA	L 0–13	7,000	
October 31		at VMI	Alumni Field; Lexington, VA	L 6–12	4,000	
November 7		at Harvard*	Harvard Stadium; Boston, MA	L 0–65	10,000	
November 14		at VPI	Miles Stadium; Blacksburg, VA (rivalry)	L 6–7		
November 26		North Carolina	Scott Stadium; Charlottesville, VA (rivalry)	L 14–59	5,000	
*Non-conference game; ^{†}Homecoming
