= 1936 Davidson Wildcats football team =

American college football season

1936 Davidson Wildcats football
- Conference: Southern Conference
- Record: 5–4 (4–3 SoCon)
- Head coach: Gene McEver (1st season)
- Home stadium: Richardson Field

1936 Southern Conference football standings
	Conf.					Overall
Team	W		L		T	W		L		T
No. 11 Duke $	7	–	0	–	0	9	–	1	–	0
North Carolina	6	–	1	–	0	8	–	2	–	0
Furman	4	–	1	–	0	7	–	2	–	0
VMI	4	–	2	–	0	6	–	4	–	0
Maryland	3	–	2	–	0	5	–	5	–	0
Clemson	3	–	3	–	0	5	–	5	–	0
Davidson	4	–	3	–	0	5	–	4	–	0
Washington and Lee	2	–	2	–	0	4	–	5	–	0
Wake Forest	2	–	2	–	0	5	–	4	–	0
NC State	2	–	4	–	0	3	–	7	–	0
VPI	4	–	5	–	0	5	–	5	–	0
South Carolina	2	–	5	–	0	5	–	7	–	0
Richmond	1	–	3	–	0	4	–	4	–	2
Virginia	1	–	5	–	0	2	–	7	–	0
The Citadel	0	–	4	–	0	4	–	6	–	0
William & Mary	0	–	5	–	0	1	–	8	–	0
$ – Conference champion; Rankings from AP Poll

The 1936 Davidson Wildcats football team was an American football team that represented Davidson College during the 1936 college football season as a member of the Southern Conference. In their first year under head coach Gene McEver, the team compiled an overall record of 5–4, with a mark of 4–3 in conference play, and finished in seventh place in the SoCon.

== Schedule ==
Date	Time	Opponent	Site	Result	Attendance	Source
September 19		vs. Duke	World War Memorial Stadium; Greensboro, NC	L 0–13	15,000	
September 26		at NC State	Riddick Stadium; Raleigh, NC	W 6–2	10,000	
October 3		at Navy*	Thompson Stadium; Annapolis, MD	L 6–19		
October 10		VMI	Richardson Field; Davidson, NC	W 38–13		
October 24		The Citadel	Richardson Field; Davidson, NC	W 21–0	6,000	
October 31		at Furman	Sirrine Stadium; Greenville, SC	L 13–14	9,000	
November 7		North Carolina^{†}	Richardson Field; Davidson, NC	L 6–26	11,000	
November 14	2:30 p.m.	vs. Centre*	American Legion Memorial Stadium; Charlotte, NC	W 27–0	5,000	
November 26		Wake Forest	Richardson Field; Davidson, NC	W 19–6	11,000	
*Non-conference game; ^{†}Homecoming; All times are in Eastern time
