= 1936 East Carolina Pirates football team =

American college football season

1936 East Carolina Pirates football
- Conference: Independent
- Record: 3–2
- Head coach: Bo Farley (1st season)

1936 Southern college football independents records
	Conf.			Overall
Team	W	L	T	W		L		T
George Washington		–		7	–	1	–	1
Hardin–Simmons		–		9	–	2	–	0
Georgetown		–		6	–	2	–	1
Roanoke		–		6	–	2	–	1
Western Maryland		–		7	–	3	–	1
No. 18 Navy		–		6	–	3	–	0
West Virginia		–		6	–	4	–	0
East Carolina		–		3	–	2	–	0
Jacksonville State		–		2	–	2	–	1
Catholic University		–		4	–	4	–	0
Oklahoma City		–		4	–	4	–	0
William & Mary Norfolk		–		4	–	4	–	0
Oglethorpe		–		4	–	5	–	0
Texas Wesleyan		–		3	–	6	–	1
Troy State		–		3	–	6	–	0
Delaware		–		2	–	6	–	0
South Georgia Teachers		–		2	–	8	–	0
Rankings from AP Poll

The 1936 East Carolina Pirates football team was an American football team that represented East Carolina Teachers College (now known as East Carolina University) as an independent during the 1936 college football season. In their only season under head coach Bo Farley, the team compiled a 3–2 record.

== Schedule ==
Date	Opponent	Site	Result	Source
October 24	at Western Carolina	Cullowhee, NC	L 6–7	
October 31	William & Mary Norfolk Division	Greenville, NC	W 25–0	
November 6	Duke JV	Greenville, NC	W 14–6	
November 14	at Guilford	Greensboro, NC	L 0–6	
November 21	Louisburg	Greenville, NC	W 19–0	
