= Jeff Triplette =

American football official (born 1951)

- Born: March 12, 1951 (age 75); Charlotte, North Carolina, U.S.
- Occupation: NFL official (1996–2017)

Jeff Triplette (born March 12, 1951) is a former American football official in the National Football League (NFL) from the 1996 season through the 2017 season. He wore uniform number 42.

== Personal life ==
Triplette is a native of Granite Falls, North Carolina, and a graduate of Wake Forest University. He is also a retired Army Reserve colonel. Triplette was awarded the Bronze Star for actions in the Persian Gulf War while serving in the North Carolina Army National Guard.

In January 2007, Triplette was named president and chief operating officer of FNC, Inc., a provider of collateral management technology to the nation's largest mortgage lenders. Before joining FNC, he was vice president for risk management at Duke Energy, a large energy company headquartered in Charlotte, North Carolina.

From March 2013 to June 2019, Triplette served as president and CEO of ArbiterSports, creator of athletic event management software designed to assist in assigning officials to athletic events.

== Officiating career ==
Triplette joined the NFL as a field judge in 1996, then switched to back judge in 1998 after the NFL swapped position titles that season, and became a referee in 1999 after four-time Super Bowl referee Jerry Markbreit announced his retirement. He was the alternate referee of Super Bowl XLI, which was held on February 4, 2007, in Miami.

On December 19, 1999, Triplette accidentally hit the Cleveland Browns' Orlando Brown in the eye with a penalty flag weighed with ball bearings. Video shows that Triplette immediately apologized to Brown, who was then tended to by the medical staff. Brown attempted to rejoin the team on the field a few minutes later, but Triplette prevented him from entering for the next play per NFL rules which stipulate that if a player incurs an injury timeout he must sit out the next play. Brown shoved Triplette to the ground and was ejected. Initially the NFL suspended Brown indefinitely, but lifted the suspension when it was learned that the flag had temporarily blinded him. As a result of the incident, the practice of officials using flags weighted with ball bearings was discontinued in favor of other material. In addition, officials are now only instructed to throw a flag at the spot of the foul if they need to mark it as a possible spot for penalty enforcement; otherwise, they only need to throw it up in the air.

On December 8, 2013, Triplette's crew initially ruled that a fourth-down run by Cincinnati Bengals running back BenJarvus Green-Ellis against the Indianapolis Colts was down by contact just short of the goal line. Because it was less than two minutes before halftime, it automatically went to replay. After reviewing the play, Triplette reversed the call and awarded the touchdown to Green-Ellis. His reversal was based on footage of Green-Ellis near the goal line where he was clearly not touched, but he did not look at footage earlier in the play where there was contact. This miscall helped revive discussions around centralizing all replay review functions to the league office, similar to the National Hockey League's system. Centralized replay was then approved at the owners' meeting on March 26, 2014, although NFL referees will still make the final decisions instead of the command center.

Triplette privately began discussing retirement from the NFL during the 2017 season. Triplette's work during his last assignment of the 2017 regular season (the Week 17 game between the Buffalo Bills and Miami Dolphins) was marred by confusion over players (at one point ejecting a player from the wrong team who was not on the field and another player who did not exist after an on-field fight, eventually correcting his mistake after a ten-minute instant replay review). In the following week's wild card game between the Kansas City Chiefs and Tennessee Titans, he was also criticized for prematurely calling the ball dead before the play would have otherwise ended on several plays; one such incident, on a sack that appeared to be a forced fumble had Triplette not blown the whistle, potentially altered the outcome of that game. (Triplette defended his decision by noting that the rules for a sack do not require the quarterback be brought down, only that he be wrapped up and/or that his progress be stopped, which Triplette argued was the case.) In both games, Triplette was criticized for losing control of the game. After the wild card game, reports surfaced that Triplette was planning to retire, and speculation also emerged that his officiating the playoff game was a farewell gesture from the league. On March 6, 2018, the league confirmed that Triplette would be leaving his position after a 22-year career. As he had notified the league well in advance, they were able to prepare for Alex Kemp to step into Triplette's position.

== Monday Night Football ==
Triplette was added to the ESPN Monday Night Football broadcast team as a rules analyst in June 2018, replacing Gerald Austin. He served for one season in the role before ESPN replaced him with John Parry.
