= 1936 VMI Keydets football team =

American college football season

1936 VMI Keydets football
- Conference: Southern Conference
- Record: 6–4 (4–2 SoCon)
- Head coach: W. C. Raftery (10th season)
- Home stadium: Alumni Field

1936 Southern Conference football standings
	Conf.					Overall
Team	W		L		T	W		L		T
No. 11 Duke $	7	–	0	–	0	9	–	1	–	0
North Carolina	6	–	1	–	0	8	–	2	–	0
Furman	4	–	1	–	0	7	–	2	–	0
VMI	4	–	2	–	0	6	–	4	–	0
Maryland	3	–	2	–	0	5	–	5	–	0
Clemson	3	–	3	–	0	5	–	5	–	0
Davidson	4	–	3	–	0	5	–	4	–	0
Washington and Lee	2	–	2	–	0	4	–	5	–	0
Wake Forest	2	–	2	–	0	5	–	4	–	0
NC State	2	–	4	–	0	3	–	7	–	0
VPI	4	–	5	–	0	5	–	5	–	0
South Carolina	2	–	5	–	0	5	–	7	–	0
Richmond	1	–	3	–	0	4	–	4	–	2
Virginia	1	–	5	–	0	2	–	7	–	0
The Citadel	0	–	4	–	0	4	–	6	–	0
William & Mary	0	–	5	–	0	1	–	8	–	0
$ – Conference champion; Rankings from AP Poll

The 1936 VMI Keydets football team was an American football team that represented the Virginia Military Institute (VMI) during the 1936 college football season as a member of the Southern Conference. In their tenth year under head coach W. C. Raftery, the team compiled an overall record of 6–4.

== Schedule ==
Date	Opponent	Site	Result	Attendance	Source
September 19	Wofford*	Alumni Field; Lexington, VA	W 19–0		
September 26	South Carolina	Alumni Field; Lexington, VA	W 24–7	3,000	
October 3	at Kentucky*	McLean Stadium; Lexington, KY	L 0–38		
October 10	at Davidson	Richardson Field; Davidson, NC	L 13–38		
October 17	at Columbia*	Baker Field; New York, NY	L 0–38	5,000	
October 24	at Richmond	City Stadium; Richmond, VA (rivalry)	W 20–0		
October 31	Virginia	Alumni Field; Lexington, VA	W 12–6	4,000	
November 7	at William & Mary	Cary Field; Williamsburg, VA (rivalry)	W 21–0	3,000	
November 14	at Maryland	Byrd Stadium; College Park, MD	W 13–7	9,000	
November 26	vs. VPI	Maher Field; Roanoke, VA (rivalry)	L 0–6	17,000	
*Non-conference game
