= 1936 Hardin–Simmons Cowboys football team =

American college football season

1936 Hardin–Simmons Cowboys football

Sun Bowl, W 14–6 vs. Texas Mines
- Conference: Independent
- Record: 9–2
- Head coach: Frank Kimbrough (2nd season)

1936 Southern college football independents records
| | Conf. | | | Overall |
| Team | W | L | T | W | | L | | T |
|---|---|---|---|---|---|---|---|---|
| George Washington | | – | | 7 | – | 1 | – | 1 |
| Hardin–Simmons | | – | | 9 | – | 2 | – | 0 |
| Georgetown | | – | | 6 | – | 2 | – | 1 |
| Roanoke | | – | | 6 | – | 2 | – | 1 |
| Western Maryland | | – | | 7 | – | 3 | – | 1 |
| No. 18 Navy | | – | | 6 | – | 3 | – | 0 |
| West Virginia | | – | | 6 | – | 4 | – | 0 |
| East Carolina | | – | | 3 | – | 2 | – | 0 |
| Jacksonville State | | – | | 2 | – | 2 | – | 1 |
| Catholic University | | – | | 4 | – | 4 | – | 0 |
| Oklahoma City | | – | | 4 | – | 4 | – | 0 |
| William & Mary Norfolk | | – | | 4 | – | 4 | – | 0 |
| Oglethorpe | | – | | 4 | – | 5 | – | 0 |
| Texas Wesleyan | | – | | 3 | – | 6 | – | 1 |
| Troy State | | – | | 3 | – | 6 | – | 0 |
| Delaware | | – | | 2 | – | 6 | – | 0 |
| South Georgia Teachers | | – | | 2 | – | 8 | – | 0 |
Rankings from AP Poll

The 1936 Hardin–Simmons Cowboys football team was an American football team that represented Hardin–Simmons University as an independent during the 1936 college football season. In its second season under head coach Frank Kimbrough, the team compiled a 9–2 record, defeated Texas Mines in the 1936 Sun Bowl, and outscored all opponents by a total of 302 to 41.

== Schedule ==
| Date | Opponent | Site | Result | Attendance | Source |
|---|---|---|---|---|---|
| September 18 | Daniel Baker | Parramore Field; Abilene, TX | W 20–0 | 3,000 | |
| September 24 | at Baylor | Waco Stadium; Waco, TX | L 0–13 | | |
| October 3 | vs. Texas A&M | Coyote Stadium; Wichita Falls, TX | L 0–3 | 6,000 | |
| October 10 | Oklahoma Baptist | Parramore Field; Abilene, TX | W 52–0 | | |
| October 24 | at Creighton | Creighton Stadium; Omaha, NE | W 13–7 | | |
| November 7 | Kansas Wesleyan | Parramore Field; Abilene, TX | W 26–0 | | |
| November 14 | Howard Payne | Parramore Field; Abilene, TX | W 31–0 | 6,000 | |
| November 21 | vs. Texas A&I | Buckaroo Field; Breckenridge, TX | W 39–6 | | |
| November 27 | Morningside | Parramore Field; Abilene, TX | W 59–0 | | |
| December 5 | vs. Fresno State | Coyote Stadium; Wichita Falls, TX | W 28–6 | 2,000 | |
| January 1, 1937 | at Texas Mines | Jones Stadium; El Paso, TX (Sun Bowl) | W 34–6 | 9,000 | |
