= 1936 Troy State Red Wave football team =

American college football season

1936 Troy State Red Wave football
- Conference: Independent
- Record: 3–5
- Head coach: Albert Elmore (6th season)
- Home stadium: Pace Field

1936 Southern college football independents records
| | Conf. | | | Overall |
| Team | W | L | T | W | | L | | T |
|---|---|---|---|---|---|---|---|---|
| George Washington | | – | | 7 | – | 1 | – | 1 |
| Hardin–Simmons | | – | | 9 | – | 2 | – | 0 |
| Georgetown | | – | | 6 | – | 2 | – | 1 |
| Roanoke | | – | | 6 | – | 2 | – | 1 |
| Western Maryland | | – | | 7 | – | 3 | – | 1 |
| No. 18 Navy | | – | | 6 | – | 3 | – | 0 |
| West Virginia | | – | | 6 | – | 4 | – | 0 |
| East Carolina | | – | | 3 | – | 2 | – | 0 |
| Jacksonville State | | – | | 2 | – | 2 | – | 1 |
| Catholic University | | – | | 4 | – | 4 | – | 0 |
| Oklahoma City | | – | | 4 | – | 4 | – | 0 |
| William & Mary Norfolk | | – | | 4 | – | 4 | – | 0 |
| Oglethorpe | | – | | 4 | – | 5 | – | 0 |
| Texas Wesleyan | | – | | 3 | – | 6 | – | 1 |
| Troy State | | – | | 3 | – | 6 | – | 0 |
| Delaware | | – | | 2 | – | 6 | – | 0 |
| South Georgia Teachers | | – | | 2 | – | 8 | – | 0 |
Rankings from AP Poll

The 1936 Troy State Red Wave football team represented Troy State Teachers College (now known as Troy University) as an independent during the 1936 college football season. Led by sixth-year head coach Albert Elmore, the Red Wave compiled an overall record of 3–5. In May 1937, Albert Choate was hired to succeed Elmore as both athletic director and head football coach.

== Schedule ==
| Date | Time | Opponent | Site | Result | Source |
|---|---|---|---|---|---|
| September 18 | | at Spring Hill | Dorn Stadium; Mobile, AL | L 0–13 | |
| September 25 | | at Tennessee Tech | Cookeville, TN | L 0–32 | |
| October 2 | 8:00 p.m. | South Georgia Teachers | Pace Field; Troy, AL | W 14–0 | |
| October 9 | | at Middle Tennessee State | Horace Jones Field; Murfreesboro, TN (rivalry) | L 0–13 | |
| October 17 | | at Oglethorpe | Hermance Stadium; North Atlanta, GA | L 6–30 | |
| October 23 | | at Pensacola NAS | Legion Field; Pensacola, FL | W 12–0 | |
| October 30 | | Newberry | Pace Field; Troy, AL | W 7–6 | |
| November 6 | | at Mississippi State Teachers | Faulkner Field; Hattiesburg, MS | L 0–24 | |
All times are in Central time
