= 1936 Jacksonville State Eagle Owls football team =

American college football season

1936 Jacksonville State Eagle Owls football
- Conference: Independent
- Record: 2–2–1
- Head coach: T. B. Shotts (6th season)
- Home stadium: College Field

1936 Southern college football independents records
	Conf.			Overall
Team	W	L	T	W		L		T
George Washington		–		7	–	1	–	1
Hardin–Simmons		–		9	–	2	–	0
Georgetown		–		6	–	2	–	1
Roanoke		–		6	–	2	–	1
Western Maryland		–		7	–	3	–	1
No. 18 Navy		–		6	–	3	–	0
West Virginia		–		6	–	4	–	0
East Carolina		–		3	–	2	–	0
Jacksonville State		–		2	–	2	–	1
Catholic University		–		4	–	4	–	0
Oklahoma City		–		4	–	4	–	0
William & Mary Norfolk		–		4	–	4	–	0
Oglethorpe		–		4	–	5	–	0
Texas Wesleyan		–		3	–	6	–	1
Troy State		–		3	–	6	–	0
Delaware		–		2	–	6	–	0
South Georgia Teachers		–		2	–	8	–	0
Rankings from AP Poll

The 1936 Jacksonville State Eagle Owls football team represented Jacksonville State Teachers College (now known as Jacksonville State University) as an independent during the 1936 college football season. Led by sixth-year head coach T. B. Shotts, the Eagle Owls compiled an overall record of 2–2–1.

== Schedule ==
Date	Opponent	Site	Result	Source
September 25	at Tennessee Tech	Overhill Field; Cookeville, TN	L 0–13	
October 2	at Middle Tennessee State	Horace Jones Field; Murfreesboro, TN	L 0–12	
October 17	at Marion	Johnson Field; Marion, AL	T 20–20	
October 31	at Piedmont	Demorest, GA	W 14–7	
November 8	at Pensacola NAS	Legion Field; Pensacola, FL	W 33–13	
