= 1936 Roanoke Maroons football team =

American college football season

1936 Roanoke Maroons football
- Conference: Independent
- Record: 6–2–1
- Head coach: Gordon C. White (7th season)
- Home stadium: College Field

1936 Southern college football independents records
	Conf.			Overall
Team	W	L	T	W		L		T
George Washington		–		7	–	1	–	1
Hardin–Simmons		–		9	–	2	–	0
Georgetown		–		6	–	2	–	1
Roanoke		–		6	–	2	–	1
Western Maryland		–		7	–	3	–	1
No. 18 Navy		–		6	–	3	–	0
West Virginia		–		6	–	4	–	0
East Carolina		–		3	–	2	–	0
Jacksonville State		–		2	–	2	–	1
Catholic University		–		4	–	4	–	0
Oklahoma City		–		4	–	4	–	0
William & Mary Norfolk		–		4	–	4	–	0
Oglethorpe		–		4	–	5	–	0
Texas Wesleyan		–		3	–	6	–	1
Troy State		–		3	–	6	–	0
Delaware		–		2	–	6	–	0
South Georgia Teachers		–		2	–	8	–	0
Rankings from AP Poll

The 1936 Roanoke Maroons football team represented Roanoke College as an independent during the 1936 college football season. Led by seventh-year head coach Gordon C. White, the Maroons compiled an overall record of 6–2–1.

== Schedule ==
Date	Opponent	Site	Result	Attendance	Source
September 19	at VPI	Miles Stadium; Blacksburg, VA	L 7–16	3,500	
September 25	Guilford	College Field; Salem, VA	W 33–0		
October 3	at Richmond	City Stadium; Richmond, VA	T 0–0		
October 9	Newberry	College Field; Salem, VA	W 25–7	2,000	
October 17	Catawba	College Field; Salem, VA	W 12–6		
October 24	at William & Mary	Cary Field; Williamsburg, VA	W 13–0		
October 31	King^{†}	College Field; Salem, VA	W 20–7	2,500	
November 7	at Emory and Henry	Fullerton Field; Emory, VA	L 12–19		
November 14	Susquehanna	College Field; Salem, VA	W 13–0		
^{†}Homecoming
