= 1941 Oklahoma City vs. Youngstown football game =

American college football game

Oklahoma City vs. Youngstown First use of penalty flag
Oklahoma City Goldbugs	Youngstown Penguins
(2–3)	(3–0–1)
7	48
Head coach: Os Doenges	Head coach: Dike Beede
	1	2	3	4	Total
Oklahoma City	0	0	7	0	7
Youngstown	14	0	13	21	48
- Date: October 16, 1941
- Season: 1941
- Stadium: Rayen Stadium
- Location: Youngstown, Ohio
- Attendance: 8,500

The 1941 Oklahoma City vs. Youngstown football game was a college football game between the Oklahoma City University Goldbugs and the Youngstown College Penguins (now called Youngstown State University) played on October 16, 1941. The game was played in Rayen Stadium in Youngstown, Ohio. The game marks the first use of the penalty flag in American football.

Youngstown was highly favored against Oklahoma City in the press, based on their undefeated record up to that point.

Youngstown defeated Oklahoma City by a score of 48 to 7.

== Game play ==
=== First quarter ===
Youngstown scored twice in the first quarter, both on connections between quarterback Jim Heber to end Pete Lanzi. The first, a 23-yard pass was the result of a fumble by Oklahoma City's fullback Bill Harris on their first possession within the first minute. The second was a 55-yard pass for a touchdown.

=== Second quarter ===
Neither team scored in the game's second quarter.

=== Third quarter ===
Youngstown scored two more touchdowns in the third quarter. First when Jim Heber threw an 18-yard pass once again to Pete Lanzi. Later in the period, substitutes Alfred Bucci caught a 21-yard pass from Glenn Dickson. The next score saw Oklahoma City complete a three-yard run for a touchdown.

=== Fourth quarter ===
Youngstown scored three more touchdowns in the fourth quarter as Glenn Dickson made it to the end zone again, this time on a 39-yard run. Youngstown defender Edward Lindsey made good with a 50-yard interception to score, and Youngstown's Cestary completed a four-yard carry. With extra points, Youngstown earned 21 points in the final quarter. Both teams managed to earn nine first downs from scrimmage. The final score was Youngstown 48, Oklahoma City 7.

== Aftermath ==
Game official Jack McPhee said, "Through the use of the signal flag, everyone in the stadium knows that something is wrong. It's been a big help." Officials generally agreed that the game play was better with the use of the penalty flag instead of the previous methods of blowing a whistle to mark a penalty. McPhee went on to use the penalty flag in other games including the Rose Bowl.

It would be the only matchup between the two schools, as Oklahoma City later de-emphasized athletics and dropped its football program after the Second World War. Coincidentally, former Oklahoma Sooners head coach Bob Stoops is a Youngstown native.

The American Football Coaches Association officially introduced the penalty flag at the 1948 rules session. The penalty flag is now standard officiating equipment and is used in every competitive football game throughout the world.

In 1969, the original penalty flag was turned over to the College Football Hall of Fame.
