= 1936 William & Mary Indians football team =

American college football season

1936 William & Mary Indians football
- Conference: Southern Conference
- Record: 1–8 (0–5 SoCon)
- Head coach: Branch Bocock (4th season)
- Captain: Joe Marino
- Home stadium: Cary Field

1936 Southern Conference football standings
	Conf.					Overall
Team	W		L		T	W		L		T
No. 11 Duke $	7	–	0	–	0	9	–	1	–	0
North Carolina	6	–	1	–	0	8	–	2	–	0
Furman	4	–	1	–	0	7	–	2	–	0
VMI	4	–	2	–	0	6	–	4	–	0
Maryland	3	–	2	–	0	5	–	5	–	0
Clemson	3	–	3	–	0	5	–	5	–	0
Davidson	4	–	3	–	0	5	–	4	–	0
Washington and Lee	2	–	2	–	0	4	–	5	–	0
Wake Forest	2	–	2	–	0	5	–	4	–	0
NC State	2	–	4	–	0	3	–	7	–	0
VPI	4	–	5	–	0	5	–	5	–	0
South Carolina	2	–	5	–	0	5	–	7	–	0
Richmond	1	–	3	–	0	4	–	4	–	2
Virginia	1	–	5	–	0	2	–	7	–	0
The Citadel	0	–	4	–	0	4	–	6	–	0
William & Mary	0	–	5	–	0	1	–	8	–	0
$ – Conference champion; Rankings from AP Poll

The 1936 William & Mary Indians football team represented the College of William & Mary during the 1936 college football season as a member of the Southern Conference. The Indians were led by head coach Branch Bocock in his fourth season and finished with a record of one win and eight losses (1–8 overall, 0–5 in the SoCon).

== Schedule ==
Date	Opponent	Site	Result	Attendance	Source
September 26	at Navy*	Thompson Stadium; Annapolis, MD	L 6–18	13,563	
October 3	vs. Virginia	Foreman Field; Norfolk, VA	L 0–7	15,000	
October 10	vs. VPI	City Stadium; Richmond, VA	L 0–14	8,000	
October 17	Guilford*	Cary Field; Williamsburg, VA	W 38–0		
October 24	Roanoke*	Cary Field; Williamsburg, VA	L 0–13		
October 31	Hampden–Sydney*	Cary Field; Williamsburg, VA	L 0–19		
November 7	VMI^{†}	Cary Field; Williamsburg, VA (rivalry)	L 0–21	3,000	
November 14	vs. Washington and Lee	Foreman Field; Norfolk, VA	L 7–13		
November 26	at Richmond	City Stadium; Richmond, VA (rivalry)	L 0–7		
*Non-conference game; ^{†}Homecoming
