= 1936 Catholic University Cardinals football team =

American college football season

1936 Catholic University Cardinals football
- Conference: Independent
- Record: 4–4
- Head coach: Dutch Bergman (7th season)
- Home stadium: Brookland Stadium

1936 Southern college football independents records
	Conf.			Overall
Team	W	L	T	W		L		T
George Washington		–		7	–	1	–	1
Hardin–Simmons		–		9	–	2	–	0
Georgetown		–		6	–	2	–	1
Roanoke		–		6	–	2	–	1
Western Maryland		–		7	–	3	–	1
No. 18 Navy		–		6	–	3	–	0
West Virginia		–		6	–	4	–	0
East Carolina		–		3	–	2	–	0
Jacksonville State		–		2	–	2	–	1
Catholic University		–		4	–	4	–	0
Oklahoma City		–		4	–	4	–	0
William & Mary Norfolk		–		4	–	4	–	0
Oglethorpe		–		4	–	5	–	0
Texas Wesleyan		–		3	–	6	–	1
Troy State		–		3	–	6	–	0
Delaware		–		2	–	6	–	0
South Georgia Teachers		–		2	–	8	–	0
Rankings from AP Poll

The 1936 Catholic University Cardinals football team was an American football team that represented the Catholic University of America as an independent during the 1936 college football season. In its seventh year under head coach Dutch Bergman, the team compiled a 4–4 record and outscored opponents by a total of 133 to 73.

== Schedule ==
Date	Opponent	Site	Result	Attendance	Source
October 2	Shenandoah	Brookland Stadium; Washington, DC	W 81–0		
October 10	La Salle	Brookland Stadium; Washington, DC	W 14–10		
October 17	DePaul	Brookland Stadium; Washington, DC	W 12–7	6,000	
October 24	at Ole Miss	Hemingway Stadium; Oxford, MS	L 0–14	6,000	
October 30	at Loyola (LA)	Loyola University Stadium; New Orleans, LA	L 0–6		
November 7	West Virginia Wesleyan	Brookland Stadium; Washington, DC	L 19–24	5,000	
November 14	NC State	Brookland Stadium; Washington, DC	W 7–6	8,500	
November 21	Western Maryland	Brookland Stadium; Washington, DC	L 0–6		
