= 1936 Delaware Fightin' Blue Hens football team =

American college football season

1936 Delaware Fightin' Blue Hens football
- Conference: Independent
- Record: 2–6
- Head coach: Lyal Clark (2nd season)
- Home stadium: Frazer Field

1936 Southern college football independents records
| | Conf. | | | Overall |
| Team | W | L | T | W | | L | | T |
|---|---|---|---|---|---|---|---|---|
| George Washington | | – | | 7 | – | 1 | – | 1 |
| Hardin–Simmons | | – | | 9 | – | 2 | – | 0 |
| Georgetown | | – | | 6 | – | 2 | – | 1 |
| Roanoke | | – | | 6 | – | 2 | – | 1 |
| Western Maryland | | – | | 7 | – | 3 | – | 1 |
| No. 18 Navy | | – | | 6 | – | 3 | – | 0 |
| West Virginia | | – | | 6 | – | 4 | – | 0 |
| East Carolina | | – | | 3 | – | 2 | – | 0 |
| Jacksonville State | | – | | 2 | – | 2 | – | 1 |
| Catholic University | | – | | 4 | – | 4 | – | 0 |
| Oklahoma City | | – | | 4 | – | 4 | – | 0 |
| William & Mary Norfolk | | – | | 4 | – | 4 | – | 0 |
| Oglethorpe | | – | | 4 | – | 5 | – | 0 |
| Texas Wesleyan | | – | | 3 | – | 6 | – | 1 |
| Troy State | | – | | 3 | – | 6 | – | 0 |
| Delaware | | – | | 2 | – | 6 | – | 0 |
| South Georgia Teachers | | – | | 2 | – | 8 | – | 0 |
Rankings from AP Poll

The 1936 Delaware Fightin' Blue Hens football team was an American football team that represented the University of Delaware in the 1936 college football season. In their second season under head coach Lyal Clark, the Blue Hens compiled a 2–6 record and were outscored by a total of 125 to 51. The team played its home games at Frazer Field in Newark, Delaware.

== Schedule ==
| Date | Opponent | Site | Result | Attendance | Source |
|---|---|---|---|---|---|
| October 3 | at Georgetown | Griffith Stadium; Washington, DC | L 0–39 | | |
| October 10 | Mount St. Mary's | Frazer Field; Newark, DE | L 0–14 | 3,500 | |
| October 17 | Saint Joseph's | Frazer Field; Newark, DE | L 8–25 | | |
| October 24 | Randolph-Macon | Frazer Field; Newark, DE | W 19–6 | 3,000 | |
| October 31 | at St. John's (MD) | Annapolis, MD | L 6–13 | 800 | |
| November 7 | vs. Pennsylvania Military | Municipal Auditorium; Atlantic City, NJ | W 6–0 | | |
| November 14 | Drexel^{†} | Frazer Field; Newark, DE | L 6–7 | | |
| November 21 | at Washington College | Chestertown, MD | L 6–21 | | |
^{†}Homecoming
