= 1936 Oglethorpe Stormy Petrels football team =

American college football season

1936 Oglethorpe Stormy Petrels football
- Conference: Independent
- Record: 4–5
- Head coach: John W. Patrick (3rd season)
- Home stadium: Hermance Stadium; Ponce de Leon Park

1936 Southern college football independents records
	Conf.			Overall
Team	W	L	T	W		L		T
George Washington		–		7	–	1	–	1
Hardin–Simmons		–		9	–	2	–	0
Georgetown		–		6	–	2	–	1
Roanoke		–		6	–	2	–	1
Western Maryland		–		7	–	3	–	1
No. 18 Navy		–		6	–	3	–	0
West Virginia		–		6	–	4	–	0
East Carolina		–		3	–	2	–	0
Jacksonville State		–		2	–	2	–	1
Catholic University		–		4	–	4	–	0
Oklahoma City		–		4	–	4	–	0
William & Mary Norfolk		–		4	–	4	–	0
Oglethorpe		–		4	–	5	–	0
Texas Wesleyan		–		3	–	6	–	1
Troy State		–		3	–	6	–	0
Delaware		–		2	–	6	–	0
South Georgia Teachers		–		2	–	8	–	0
Rankings from AP Poll

The 1936 Oglethorpe Stormy Petrels football team was an American football team that represented Oglethorpe University as an independent during the 1936 college football season. In their third year under head coach John W. Patrick, the Stormy Petrels compiled a 4–5 record.

== Schedule ==
Date	Time	Opponent	Site	Result	Attendance	Source
September 23		Newberry	Ponce de Leon Park; Atlanta, GA	W 13–2		
October 2		vs. Mercer	Municipal Stadium; Albany, GA	L 6–20	6,000	
October 10		at Chattanooga	Chamberlain Field; Chattanooga, TN	L 6–20		
October 17		Troy State	Hermance Stadium; North Atlanta, GA	W 30–6		
October 24		Emory and Henry	Hermance Stadium; North Atlanta, GA	W 20–0		
October 31		at Western Kentucky State Teachers	Western Stadium; Bowling Green, KY	L 0–6		
November 6		Erskine	Ponce de Leon Park; Atlanta, GA	W 18–0		
November 14		at Mississippi College	Municipal Stadium; Jackson, MS	L 0–26		
November 26	2:30 p.m.	at Stetson	DeLand, FL	L 7–13		
All times are in Eastern time
