= 1936 West Virginia Mountaineers football team =

American college football season

1936 West Virginia Mountaineers football
- Conference: Independent
- Record: 6–4
- Head coach: Charles Tallman (3rd season)
- Captain: Babe Barna
- Home stadium: Mountaineer Field

1936 Southern college football independents records
	Conf.			Overall
Team	W	L	T	W		L		T
George Washington		–		7	–	1	–	1
Hardin–Simmons		–		9	–	2	–	0
Georgetown		–		6	–	2	–	1
Roanoke		–		6	–	2	–	1
Western Maryland		–		7	–	3	–	1
No. 18 Navy		–		6	–	3	–	0
West Virginia		–		6	–	4	–	0
East Carolina		–		3	–	2	–	0
Jacksonville State		–		2	–	2	–	1
Catholic University		–		4	–	4	–	0
Oklahoma City		–		4	–	4	–	0
William & Mary Norfolk		–		4	–	4	–	0
Oglethorpe		–		4	–	5	–	0
Texas Wesleyan		–		3	–	6	–	1
Troy State		–		3	–	6	–	0
Delaware		–		2	–	6	–	0
South Georgia Teachers		–		2	–	8	–	0
Rankings from AP Poll

The 1936 West Virginia Mountaineers football team was an American football team that represented West Virginia University as an independent during the 1936 college football season. In its third season under head coach Charles Tallman, the team compiled a 6–4 record and outscored opponents by a total of 151 to 122. The team played its home games at Mountaineer Field in Morgantown, West Virginia. Babe Barna was the team captain.

== Schedule ==
Date	Time	Opponent	Site	Result	Attendance	Source
September 19		Waynesburg	Mountaineer Field; Morgantown, WV	W 7–0		
September 26		at Cincinnati	Nippert Stadium; Cincinnati, OH	W 40–6		
October 3		at Pittsburgh	Pitt Stadium; Pittsburgh, PA (rivalry)	L 0–34	21,000	
October 10		vs. Washington and Lee	Laidley Field; Charleston, WV	W 28–7		
October 17		West Virginia Wesleyan	Mountaineer Field; Morgantown, WV	W 15–0	7,500	
October 24	3:00 p.m.	vs. Centre	duPont Stadium; Louisville, KY	W 26–13	6,000	
October 31		Western Maryland	Mountaineer Field; Morgantown, WV	W 33–20	10,000	
November 7		Georgetown	Mountaineer Field; Morgantown, WV	L 0–28		
November 14		at Western Reserve	League Park; Cleveland, OH	L 0–7	8,000	
November 26		at George Washington	Griffith Stadium; Washington, DC	L 2–7	20,000	
All times are in Eastern time
