= 1936 Georgetown Hoyas football team =

American college football season

1936 Georgetown Hoyas football
- Conference: Independent
- Record: 6–2–1
- Head coach: Jack Hagerty (5th season)
- Captain: Al Vaccaro
- Home stadium: Griffith Stadium

1936 Southern college football independents records
	Conf.			Overall
Team	W	L	T	W		L		T
George Washington		–		7	–	1	–	1
Hardin–Simmons		–		9	–	2	–	0
Georgetown		–		6	–	2	–	1
Roanoke		–		6	–	2	–	1
Western Maryland		–		7	–	3	–	1
No. 18 Navy		–		6	–	3	–	0
West Virginia		–		6	–	4	–	0
East Carolina		–		3	–	2	–	0
Jacksonville State		–		2	–	2	–	1
Catholic University		–		4	–	4	–	0
Oklahoma City		–		4	–	4	–	0
William & Mary Norfolk		–		4	–	4	–	0
Oglethorpe		–		4	–	5	–	0
Texas Wesleyan		–		3	–	6	–	1
Troy State		–		3	–	6	–	0
Delaware		–		2	–	6	–	0
South Georgia Teachers		–		2	–	8	–	0
Rankings from AP Poll

The 1936 Georgetown Hoyas football team was an American football team that represented Georgetown University as an independent during the 1936 college football season. In their fifth season under head coach Jack Hagerty, the Hoyas compiled a 6–2–1 record and outscored opponents by a total of 160 to 36. The team played its home games at Griffith Stadium in Washington, D.C.

== Schedule ==
Date	Opponent	Site	Result	Attendance	Source
October 3	Delaware	Griffith Stadium; Washington, DC	W 39–0		
October 10	at Cincinnati	Nippert Stadium; Cincinnati, OH	W 7–0	4,500	
October 17	Bucknell	Griffith Stadium; Washington, DC	W 19–0	9,000	
October 24	at NYU	Yankee Stadium; Bronx, NY	T 7–7		
October 31	Shenandoah	Griffith Stadium; Washington, DC	W 47–0	2,500	
November 7	at West Virginia	Mountaineer Field; Morgantown, WV	W 28–0		
November 14	at Manhattan	Ebbets Field; Brooklyn, NY	L 0–13	20,000	
November 21	at Maryland	Byrd Stadium; College Park, MD	W 7–6	12,000	
December 4	at Miami (FL)	Miami Stadium; Miami, FL	L 6–10	7,500	
