= 1936 Duke Blue Devils football team =

American college football season

1936 Duke Blue Devils football

National champion (QPRS) SoCon champion
- Conference: Southern Conference

Ranking
- AP: No. 11
- Record: 9–1 (7–0 SoCon)
- Head coach: Wallace Wade (6th season)
- Offensive scheme: Single-wing
- MVP: Ace Parker
- Captain: Ace Parker
- Home stadium: Duke Stadium

1936 Southern Conference football standings
	Conf.					Overall
Team	W		L		T	W		L		T
No. 11 Duke $	7	–	0	–	0	9	–	1	–	0
North Carolina	6	–	1	–	0	8	–	2	–	0
Furman	4	–	1	–	0	7	–	2	–	0
VMI	4	–	2	–	0	6	–	4	–	0
Maryland	3	–	2	–	0	5	–	5	–	0
Clemson	3	–	3	–	0	5	–	5	–	0
Davidson	4	–	3	–	0	5	–	4	–	0
Washington and Lee	2	–	2	–	0	4	–	5	–	0
Wake Forest	2	–	2	–	0	5	–	4	–	0
NC State	2	–	4	–	0	3	–	7	–	0
VPI	4	–	5	–	0	5	–	5	–	0
South Carolina	2	–	5	–	0	5	–	7	–	0
Richmond	1	–	3	–	0	4	–	4	–	2
Virginia	1	–	5	–	0	2	–	7	–	0
The Citadel	0	–	4	–	0	4	–	6	–	0
William & Mary	0	–	5	–	0	1	–	8	–	0
$ – Conference champion; Rankings from AP Poll

The 1936 Duke Blue Devils football team was an American football team that represented Duke University as a member of the Southern Conference during the 1936 college football season. In its sixth season under head coach Wallace Wade, the team compiled a 9–1 record (7–0 against conference opponents), won the conference championship, and outscored opponents by a total of 208 to 28. Ace Parker was the team captain. The team played its home games at Duke Stadium in Durham, North Carolina.

Both Clyde Berryman and James Howell named Duke as a retroactive national champion for 1936.

== Schedule ==
Date	Opponent	Rank	Site	Result	Attendance	Source
September 19	vs. Davidson		World War Memorial Stadium; Greensboro, NC	W 13–0	15,000	
September 26	Colgate*^{†}		Duke Stadium; Durham, NC	W 6–0	22,360	
October 3	at South Carolina		Carolina Municipal Stadium; Columbia, SC	W 21–0	10,000	
October 10	Clemson		Duke Stadium; Durham, NC	W 25–0	4,127	
October 17	Georgia Tech*		Duke Stadium; Durham, NC	W 19–6	29,953	
October 24	at Tennessee*	No. 2	Shields–Watkins Field; Knoxville, TN	L 13–15	13,263	
October 31	vs. Washington and Lee	No. 13	City Stadium; Richmond, VA	W 51–0	6,691	
November 7	at Wake Forest	No. 15	Gore Field; Wake Forest, NC (rivalry)	W 20–0	10,000	
November 14	at North Carolina	No. 13	Chapel Hill, NC (Victory Bell)	W 27–7	34,000	
November 26	NC State	No. 11	Duke Stadium; Durham, NC (rivalry)	W 13–0	17,320	
*Non-conference game; ^{†}Homecoming; Rankings from AP Poll released prior to the game
