= Sirrine Stadium =

Football stadium in Greenville, South Carolina

- Interactive map of Sirrine Stadium
- Location: Greenville, South Carolina
- Coordinates: 34.8382°N 82.3976°W
- Capacity: 15,000

Tenants
- Furman Paladins football (1936–1980); Greenville High School

Sirrine Stadium is a stadium in Greenville, South Carolina, United States. It was used by Furman University's American football team from 1936 to 1980. The stadium opened on October 31, 1936, with a Furman victory over Davidson. It has a seating capacity of 15,000. It is currently used by the Greenville High School Red Raiders and has hosted the HBCU Classic since 2005.
