= Dike Beede =

American football player and coach (1903–1972)

Biographical details
- Born: January 23, 1903; Youngstown, Ohio, U.S.
- Died: December 10, 1972 (aged 69); Elkton, Ohio, U.S.

Playing career
- 1924–1925: Carnegie Tech
- Position: Fullback

Coaching career (HC unless noted)
- 1926–1930: Westminster (PA)
- 1934–1936: Geneva
- 1938–1972: Youngstown / Youngstown State

Head coaching record
- Overall: 175–149–20

Accomplishments and honors

Championships
- 1 Tri-State (1928)

Dwight Vincent "Dike" Beede (January 23, 1903 – December 10, 1972) was an American college football player and coach. He served as the first head football coach at Westminster College in New Wilmington, Pennsylvania in 1926, Geneva College in Beaver Falls, Pennsylvania from 1934 to 1936, and Youngstown State University in Youngstown, Ohio from 1938 to 1972, compiling a career coaching record of 175–149–20. In 1941, he invented and introduced the penalty flag, now a common fixture of American football.

Some sources spell his name "Dyke" Beede.

== Early life and playing career ==
Beede was born in Youngstown, Ohio, a steel-manufacturing center located near the Pennsylvania border. He attended the city's South High School, where he was class president and played football. In his senior year, Beede received a football scholarship to Newberry College, in South Carolina. He later transferred to Pittsburgh's Carnegie Institute of Technology—now known as Carnegie Mellon University—where he studied structural engineering and played football. While in college, Beede joined Kappa Sigma fraternity.

As a standout player with Walter Steffen's Carnegie squad in the 1920s, Beede made football history when he introduced the famous "spinner play." He served as captain of the 1925 Carnegie Tech Tartans football team and also played basketball.

== Coaching career ==
Upon graduation, Beede turned down an offer to teach mathematics Carnegie Tech and, in 1926 accepted the position of head football coach at Westminster College in New Wilmington, Pennsylvania. He held this position for five years, coaching an outstanding team that tied Duquesne University for the tri-state championship.

Beede was the 17th head football coach at Geneva College in Beaver Falls, Pennsylvania, serving for three seasons, from 1934 to 1936, and compiling a record of 14–10–3. After completing his seasons at Geneva, he went to Youngstown College, where he enjoyed several successful decades as football coach.

In 1957, Beede was honored as Coach of the Year by the Football Writers Association of American Small Colleges. In 1966, Beede was named to the Helms Football Foundation Hall of Fame. Beede was an avid tree farmer and served on Ohio's Forestry Advisory Council. In addition to his coaching duties, Beede was an associate professor of biology at Youngstown State University.

Beede retired from Youngstown State University on November 18, 1972.

=== Father of penalty flag ===
See 1941 Oklahoma City vs. Youngstown football game

Beede was an important influence on football not only regionally, but nationally. His most celebrated innovation was the penalty flag, which he created and introduced on October 17, 1941. The flag was first used in a game against Oklahoma City University at Youngstown's Rayen Stadium. Prior to the introduction of the penalty flag, officials used horns and whistles to signal a penalty. This made it difficult for the players, since they would hear the whistle and sometimes stop, even though the infraction was caused by the other team. This would deprive the non-guilty team of the yardage they might rightfully have gained. Also, the fans and media sometimes could not recognize an infraction on the field because they had failed to hear the signal.

At the 1941 contest at Rayen Stadium, Oklahoma City Coach Os Doenges and four game officials–Hugh McFee, Jack McFee, Bill Renner, and Carl Rebele–--agreed to use the flag as an experiment. Jack McFee later employed the penalty flag at the Ohio State-Iowa game, during which league commissioner Major John Griffith was present.

Beede's first wife, Irma, was often jokingly referred to as the "Betsy Ross of Football," because she sewed the first penalty flag. Beede asked her to fashion a flag that was brightly colored with white stripes. Irma Beede reportedly used pieces of their daughter's Halloween costume and an old bed sheet for the flag, and curtain weights to add weight and heft. The original flag was 16" square with weight all at one end. The penalty flag has been modified over the years, and today, it is a yellow cloth that is filled with sand at one end.

== Family and death ==
Beede and his wife, Irma, had two daughters, Gretchen and Susan, and a son, Rudd. Rudd drowned in 1957.

On December 10, 1972, just a month after having retired from Youngstown State University, Beede died in a drowning accident at Little Beaver Creek near his farm in Elkton, Ohio, located in Columbiana County.

== Head coaching record ==
Year	Team	Overall	Conference	Standing	Bowl/playoffs
Westminster Titans (Tri-State Conference) (1926–1930)
1926	Westminster	1–4–1	0–3–1	6th	
1927	Westminster	2–3–2	1–1–1	T–2nd	
1928	Westminster	4–5	4–1	T–1st	
1929	Westminster	3–4	2–2	T–3rd	
1930	Westminster	4–5	1–2	4th	
Westminster:		14–21–3	8–9–2		
Geneva Covenanters (Independent) (1934–1936)
1934	Geneva	2–5–2			
1935	Geneva	8–1			
1936	Geneva	4–4–1			
Geneva:		14–10–3			
Youngstown / Youngstown State Penguins (NCAA College Division independent) (1938–1972)
1938	Youngstown	4–5			
1939	Youngstown	4–5			
1940	Youngstown	7–1–1			
1941	Youngstown	7–0–1			
1942	Youngstown	6–3			
1943	No team—World War II				
1944	No team—World War II				
1945	No team—World War II				
1946	Youngstown	7–1			
1947	Youngstown	8–2			
1948	Youngstown	4–3–2			
1949	Youngstown	4–3–1			
1950	Youngstown	3–5			
1951	Youngstown	2–6–1			
1952	Youngstown	4–3–1			
1953	Youngstown	7–1			
1954	Youngstown	7–2			
1955	Youngstown	4–5			
1956	Youngstown	4–4			
1957	Youngstown	3–6			
1958	Youngstown	4–4			
1959	Youngstown	5–4–1			
1960	Youngstown	6–2			
1961	Youngstown	4–4–1			
1962	Youngstown	6–3			
1963	Youngstown	5–4–1			
1964	Youngstown	6–1–2			
1965	Youngstown	6–2			
1966	Youngstown	5–3–1			
1967	Youngstown State	4–5			
1968	Youngstown State	3–6			
1969	Youngstown State	2–6			
1970	Youngstown State	0–9			
1971	Youngstown State	2–6			
1972	Youngstown State	4–4–1			
Youngstown State:		147–118–14			
Total:		175–149–20			
National championship Conference title Conference division title or championship game berth
