= Penalty flag =

Piece of equipment used in sports officiating

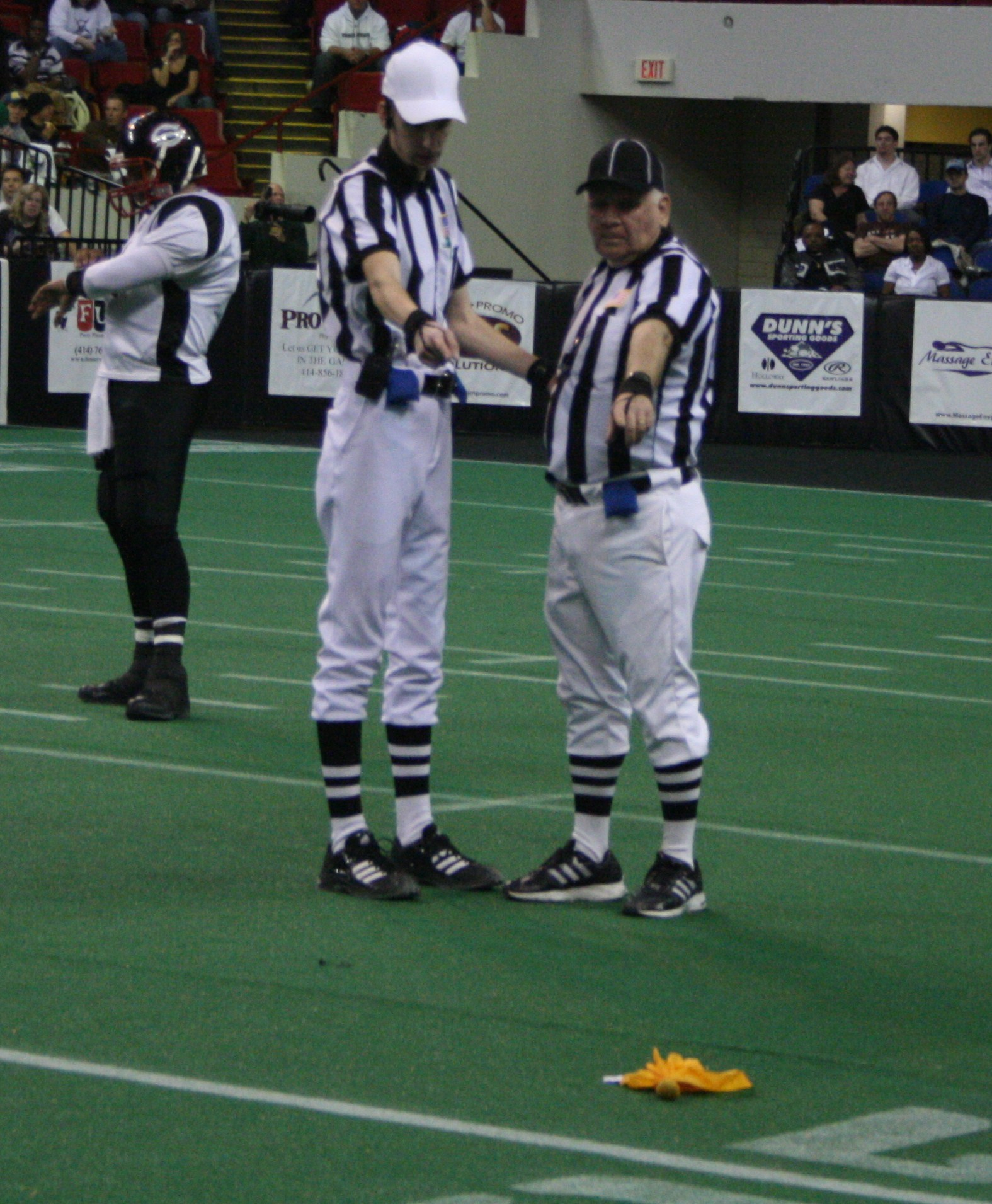
Officials point at a penalty flag lying on the field.

The penalty flag (or just "flag"), often called a penalty marker (or just "marker"), is a yellow cloth used in several field sports including American football, Canadian football, and lacrosse by game officials to identify and sometimes mark the location of penalties or infractions that occur during regular play. It is usually wrapped around a weight, such as sand or beans so it can be thrown accurately over greater distances and cannot easily be blown away. Many officials previously weighted flags with ball bearings, but the practice was largely discontinued after a flag thrown by NFL referee Jeff Triplette struck Cleveland Browns offensive tackle Orlando Brown Sr. in the eye during a 1999 game, causing a serious injury to Brown. Brown was forced to sit out three seasons because of the eye injury and settled with the NFL for a reported amount of $25 million.

NFL penalty flags were colored white until 1965, when the color was changed to yellow. Penalty flags in college football were red until the 1970s, before also being changed to yellow. To mark field position after a change in possession, such as after an interception or punt, a small bean bag is used to mark where the change of possession took place. These bean bags are typically black, blue, or white; other colors such as orange have occasionally been used. In 2022, the Canadian Football League changed its flag from orange to yellow.

The idea for the penalty flag came from Youngstown State coach Dwight Beede and was first used in a game against Oklahoma City University on October 17, 1941. Prior to the use of flags, officials used horns and whistles to signal a penalty. Official adoption of the use of the flag occurred at the 1948 American Football Coaches rules session. The National Football League first used flags on September 17, 1948 when the Green Bay Packers played the Boston Yanks.

In October 2013, the NFL planned to use pink penalty flags throughout the month as part of the league's breast cancer awareness initiative. This was changed after two weeks, due to confusion with other pink apparel on players and game officials. Some high schools still use the pink flags during October games today.

In some football leagues, coaches are given a challenge flag of similar construction to a penalty flag. The flag is red in American football and yellow in Canadian football, so it contrasts with the officials' penalty flags. It is thrown onto the field by a coach when he wishes to contest (challenge) a referee's decision.

== See also ==
- Penalty card, used in soccer and several other sports to signal certain penalties.
- Vanishing spray, used in soccer to provide a temporary marker for the spot of a foul.
