= Oklahoma City Chiefs football =

- First season: 1905
- Last season: 1949; 77 years ago
- Stadium: Goldbug Field; Taft Stadium
- Location: Oklahoma City, Oklahoma
- All-time record: 114–114–14 (.500)
- Bowl record: 0–1 (.000)

Conference championships
- 2
- Colors: Blue and white

The Oklahoma City Chiefs football program represented Oklahoma City University and its predecessor institutions in college football. The team began play in 1905 representing Epworth University as the "Epworth Methodists". Epworth closed in 1911 was replaced by Oklahoma Methodist University located in Guthrie, Oklahoma, which the football team represented from 1911 to 1916 as "Oklahoma Methodist".

After a hiatus during the World War I years, the team returned to play in 1921 as the "Oklahoma City Goldbugs". Oklahoma Methodist University had relocated to Oklahoma City in 1919 as was renamed as Oklahoma City College. The school adopted its current name in 1924. The football team was known as the Goldbugs through 1941. After another hiatus during World War II, the football team returned to competition in 1946 as the Chiefs. Financial pressures forced the dissolution of the football program following the 1949 season.

== Innovations ==
Oklahoma City's football program and head coach Os Doenges made multiple innovative attempts to improving the game.

The first and most successful innovation was credited to opposing coach Dike Beede when the football team played in the 1941 Oklahoma City vs. Youngstown football game. This game marks the first American football game to use a penalty flag.

The second innovation was an unsuccessful venture to allow a coach to be on the field with the offense to help call plays and provide additional coaching as time allows. Doenges proposed tests with opposing coaches and at least two agreed to test the idea. However, the concept itself was considered a success and rules changes eventually allowed coaches on the sidelines to call plays and send plays in with a substitute.

Also, Doenges is credited with inventing the offensive V formation while at Oklahoma City. Nicknamed "Three dots and a dash" (Morse code for the letter "v"), the program presented the new offensive formation to great fanfare before losing to the Southwestern Moundbuilders by a score of 7–0.

The team played Toledo in the 1948 Glass Bowl, losing 27–14.

== Championships ==
Oklahoma City won two conference championships during their program's existence.

Year	Conference	Coach	Overall record	Conference record
1927†	Oklahoma Intercollegiate Conference	Pappy Waldorf	8–1–2	5–1–2
1931	Big Four Conference	Vee Green	12–0	3–0
Total conference championships:			2 (1 OIC, 1 Big Four)	
† Denotes co-champions

== Bowl game ==
Oklahoma City participated in the 1948 Glass Bowl.

#	Bowl	Score	Date	Season	Opponent	Stadium	Location	Attendance	Head coach
1	Glass Bowl	L 14–27	December 4, 1948	1948	Toledo	Glass Bowl	Toledo, Ohio	8,500	Orville Tuttle

== NFL draftees ==
Oklahoma City had six players selected in National Football League Draft between 1947 and 1950.

Year	Rnd	Pick	Player	Position	NFL team	Notes
1947	9	74	John Novitsky	T	New York Giants	—
1947	15	135	Wayne Goodall	E	Chicago Bears	—
1947	17	147	Marion Shirley	T	Boston Yanks	—
1948	27	250	Jim Wade	HB	Los Angeles Rams	—
1949	23	231	Hank Kalver	T	Philadelphia Eagles	—
1950	6	77	Orville Langrell	T	Los Angeles Rams	—
