= 1936–37 NCAA football bowl games =

College football postseason game series

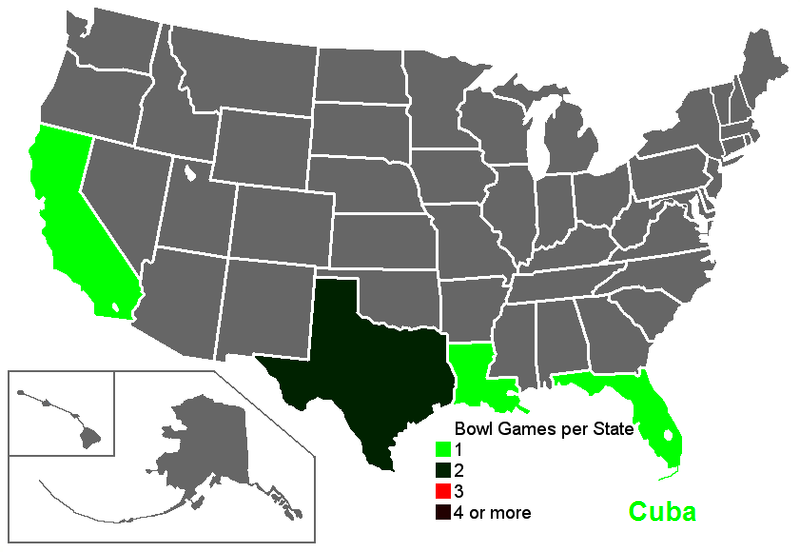
- Number of bowl games per state. Note that the Bacardi Bowl was held in Havana, Cuba.
- Season: 1936
- Number of bowls: 6
- All-star games: East–West Shrine Game
- Bowl games: January 1, 1937
- Champions: Minnesota Golden Gophers (AP, Dickinson, Dunkel)
Bowl record by conference
Conference	Bowls	Record	Final AP poll
Independents	6	4–1–1 (0.750)	10
SEC	3	0–2–1 (0.167)	3
SWC	1	1–0 (1.000)	2
Border	1	0–1 (0.000)	0
Pacific Coast	1	0–1 (0.000)	1
Big Six	0	0–0 (–)	1
Big Ten	0	0–0 (–)	2
Rocky Mountain	0	0–0 (–)	0
Southern	0	0–0 (–)	1

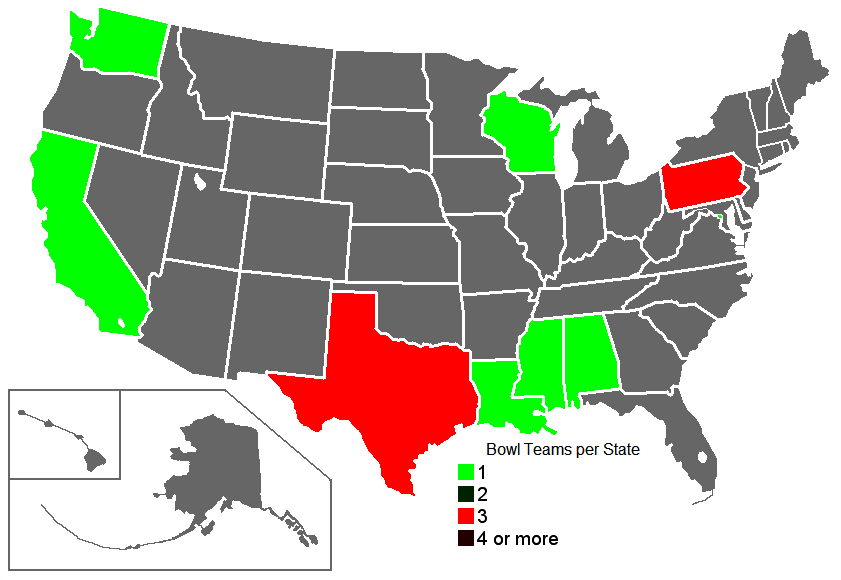
Number of bowl teams per state

The 1936–37 NCAA football bowl games were the final games of the National Collegiate Athletic Association (NCAA) 1936 college football season and featured six bowl games, an increase of two from the prior season. In addition to the prior season's four bowls, the Cotton Bowl Classic was played for the first time, and this was the only season that the Bacardi Bowl was recognized by the NCAA. All six games were played on January 1, 1937. The national championship, according to recognized selectors, was won by Minnesota.

== Poll rankings ==
The below table lists top teams (per the AP poll taken after the completion of the regular season), their win–loss records (prior to bowl games), and the bowls they later played in.

AP	Team	W–L	Conf.	Bowl
1	Minnesota Golden Gophers	7–1	Big Ten	— †
2	LSU Tigers	9–0–1	SEC	Sugar Bowl
3	Pittsburgh Panthers	7–1–1	Ind.	Rose Bowl
4	Alabama Crimson Tide	8–0–1	SEC	—
5	Washington Huskies	7–1–1	PCC	Rose Bowl
6	Santa Clara Broncos	7–0	Ind.	Sugar Bowl
7	Northwestern Wildcats	7–1	Big Ten	— †
8	Notre Dame Fighting Irish	6–2	Ind.	—
9	Nebraska Cornhuskers	7–2	Big Six	—
10	Penn Quakers	7–1	Ind.	—
11	Duke Blue Devils	9–1	Southern	—
12	Yale Bulldogs	7–1	Ind.	—
13	Dartmouth Indians	7–1–1	Ind.	—
14	Duquesne Dukes	7–2	Ind.	Orange Bowl
15	Fordham Rams	5–1–2	Ind.	—
16	TCU Horned Frogs	7–2–2	SWC	Cotton Bowl Classic
17	Tennessee Volunteers	6–2–1	SEC	—
T18	Arkansas Razorbacks	6–3	SWC	—
T18	Navy Midshipmen	6–3	Ind.	—
20	Marquette Golden Avalanche	7–1	Ind.	Cotton Bowl Classic

† The Big Ten Conference did not allow its members to participate in bowl games until the 1947 Rose Bowl.

== Bowl schedule ==
Rankings are from the final regular season AP Poll.

Date	Game	Site	Teams	Affiliations	Results
Jan. 1	Rose Bowl	Rose Bowl; Pasadena, California	No. 3 Pittsburgh Panthers (7–1–1); No. 5 Washington Huskies (7–1–1)	Independent; PCC	Pittsburgh 21; Washington 0
Jan. 1	Sugar Bowl	Tulane Stadium; New Orleans, Louisiana	No. 6 Santa Clara Broncos (7–1); No. 2 LSU Tigers (9–0–1)	Independent; SEC	Santa Clara 21; LSU 14
Jan. 1	Orange Bowl	Miami Field; Miami, Florida	No. 14 Duquesne Dukes (7–2); Mississippi State Maroons (7–2–1)	Independent; SEC	Duquesne 13; Mississippi State 12
Jan. 1	Sun Bowl	Jones Stadium; El Paso, Texas	Hardin–Simmons Cowboys (8–2); Texas Mines Miners (5–3–2)	Independent; Border	Hardin–Simmons 34; Texas Mines 6
Jan. 1	Cotton Bowl Classic	Cotton Bowl; Dallas, Texas	No. 16 TCU Horned Frogs (8–2–2); No. 20 Marquette Golden Avalanche (7–1)	SWC; Independent	TCU 16; Marquette 6
Jan. 1	Bacardi Bowl	La Tropical Stadium; Havana, Cuba	Auburn Tigers (7–2–1); Villanova Wildcats (7–2)	SEC; Independent	Auburn 7 Villanova 7

=== Conference performance in bowl games ===
Conference	Games	Record				Bowls		
Conference	Games	W	L	T	Pct.	Won	Lost	Tied
Independents	6	4	1	1	.750	Orange, Rose, Sugar, Sun	Cotton	Bacardi
SEC	3	0	2	1	.167	—	Orange, Sugar	Bacardi
SWC	1	1	0	0	1.000	Cotton	—	—
Border	1	0	1	0	.000	—	Sun	—
Pacific Coast	1	0	1	0	.000	—	Rose	—

== See also ==
- Prairie View Bowl
