= 1936 Southeastern Conference football season =

- Sport: Football
- Duration: September 19, 1936 – January 1, 1937
- Teams: 13
- Champion: LSU

SEC seasons
- ← 1935 1937 →

1936 Southeastern Conference football standings
	Conf.					Overall
Team	W		L		T	W		L		T
No. 2 LSU $	6	–	0	–	0	9	–	1	–	1
No. 4 Alabama	5	–	0	–	1	8	–	0	–	1
Auburn	4	–	1	–	1	7	–	2	–	2
No. 17 Tennessee	3	–	1	–	2	6	–	2	–	2
Mississippi State	3	–	2	–	0	7	–	3	–	1
Georgia	3	–	3	–	0	5	–	4	–	1
Georgia Tech	3	–	3	–	1	5	–	5	–	1
Tulane	2	–	3	–	1	6	–	3	–	1
Vanderbilt	1	–	3	–	1	3	–	5	–	1
Kentucky	1	–	3	–	0	6	–	4	–	0
Florida	1	–	5	–	0	4	–	6	–	0
Ole Miss	0	–	3	–	1	5	–	5	–	2
Sewanee	0	–	5	–	0	0	–	6	–	1
$ – Conference champion

The 1936 Southeastern Conference football season was the fourth season of college football played by the member schools of the Southeastern Conference (SEC) and was a part of the 1936 college football season. LSU compiled a 9–1–1 overall record, with a conference record of 6–0, and was the SEC champion.

== Results and team statistics ==
Conf. rank	Team	Head coach	Overall record	Conf. record	AP final	PPG	PAG
1	LSU	Bernie Moore	9–1–1 (.864)	6–0–0 (1.000)	No. 2	26.8	4.9
2	Alabama	Frank Thomas	8–0–1 (.944)	5–0–1 (.917)	No. 4	18.7	3.9
3	Auburn	Jack Meagher	7–2–2 (.727)	4–1–1 (.750)		14.5	5.7
4	Tennessee	Robert Neyland	6–2–2 (.700)	3–1–2 (.667)	No. 17	14.7	5.2
5	Mississippi State	Ralph Sasse	7–3–1 (.682)	3–2–0 (.600)		21.1	3.5
6	Georgia	Harry Mehre	5–4–1 (.550)	3–3–0 (.500)		11.5	15.9
7	Georgia Tech	William Alexander	5–5–1 (.500)	3–3–1 (.500)		22.8	9.4
8	Tulane	Red Dawson	6–3–1 (.650)	2–3–1 (.417)		16.3	11.7
9	Vanderbilt	Ray Morrison	3–5–1 (.389)	1–3–1 (.300)		12.8	9.7
10	Kentucky	Chet A. Wynne	6–4–0 (.600)	1–3–0 (.250)		17.9	8.4
11	Florida	Josh Cody	4–6–0 (.400)	1–5–0 (.167)		9.9	12.5
12	Ole Miss	Ed Walker	5–5–2 (.500)	0–3–1 (.125)		12.5	8.2
13	Sewanee	Harry E. Clark	0–6–1 (.071)	0–5–0 (.000)		2.9	32.9

Key
AP final = Rankings from AP sports writers. See 1936 college football rankings
PPG = Average of points scored per game
PAG = Average of points allowed per game

== Schedule ==
Index to colors and formatting
SEC member won
SEC member lost
SEC member tie
SEC teams in **bold**

=== Week Zero ===
Date	Visiting team	Home team	Site	Result	Attendance	Ref.
September 19	Maryville (TN)	**Kentucky**	McLean Stadium • Lexington, KY	**W** 54–3		
September 19	Union (TN)	**Ole Miss**	Hemingway Stadium • Oxford, MS	**W** 45–0		

=== Week One ===
Date	Visiting team	Home team	Site	Result	Attendance	Ref.
September 25	Birmingham–Southern	**Auburn**	Cramton Bowl • Montgomery, AL	**W** 45–0	12,000	
September 25	**Kentucky**	Xavier	Corcoran Field • Cincinnati, OH	**W** 21–0	12,000	
September 26	Rice	**LSU**	Tiger Stadium • Baton Rouge, LA	**W** 20–7	25,000	
September 26	Howard (AL)	**Alabama**	Denny Stadium • Tuscaloosa, AL	**W** 34–0	8,000	
September 26	Chattanooga	**Tennessee**	Shields–Watkins Field • Knoxville, TN	**W** 13–0	7,000	
September 26	Millsaps	**Mississippi State**	Scott Field • Starkville, MS	**W** 20–0	4,000	
September 26	Mercer	**Georgia**	Sanford Stadium • Athens, GA	**W** 15–6	7,000	
September 26	Presbyterian	**Georgia Tech**	Grant Field • Atlanta, GA	**W** 55–0		
September 26	Middle Tennessee State Teachers	**Vanderbilt**	Dudley Field • Nashville, TN	**W** 45–0	7,000	
September 26	**Ole Miss**	**Tulane**	Tulane Stadium • New Orleans, LA	**TUL** 7–6	18,000	

=== Week Two ===
Date	Visiting team	Home team	Site	Result	Attendance	Ref.
October 2	**Ole Miss**	Temple	Temple Stadium • Philadelphia, PA	**L** 7–12		
October 3	Clemson	**Alabama**	Denny Stadium • Tuscaloosa, AL (rivalry)	**W** 32–0	6,000	
October 3	Howard (AL)	**Mississippi State**	Scott Field • Starkville, MS	**W** 35–0		
October 3	Furman	**Georgia**	Sanford Stadium • Athens, GA	**W** 13–0	4,001	
October 3	**Vanderbilt**	Chicago	Stagg Field • Chicago, IL	**W** 37–0	12,000	
October 3	VMI	**Kentucky**	McLean Stadium • Lexington, KY	**W** 38–0		
October 3	The Citadel	**Florida**	Florida Field • Gainesville, FL	**W** 20–14	5,000	
October 3	**LSU**	Texas	War Memorial Stadium • Austin, TX	**T** 6–6	15,000	
October 3	**Tennessee**	North Carolina	Kenan Memorial Stadium • Chapel Hill, NC	**L** 6–14	15,000	
October 3	**Sewanee**	**Georgia Tech**	Grant Field • Atlanta, GA	**GT** 58–0	8,000	
October 3	**Auburn**	**Tulane**	Tulane Stadium • New Orleans, LA (rivalry)	0–0	18,000	

=== Week Three ===
Date	Visiting team	Home team	Site	Result	Attendance	Ref.
October 9	**Ole Miss**	George Washington	Griffith Stadium • Washington DC	**T** 0–0		
October 10	Centenary	**Tulane**	Tulane Stadium • New Orleans, LA	**W** 19–0	17,000	
October 10	Southwestern (TN)	**Vanderbilt**	Dudley Field • Nashville, TN	**L** 0–12	5,000	
October 10	**Florida**	South Carolina	Columbia Municipal Stadium • Columbia, SC	**L** 0–7	4,000	
October 10	**Georgia**	**LSU**	Tiger Stadium • Baton Rouge, LA	**LSU** 47–7	18,000	
October 10	**Mississippi State**	**Alabama**	Denny Stadium • Tuscaloosa, AL (rivalry)	**ALA** 7–0	17,000	
October 10	**Auburn**	**Tennessee**	Shields–Watkins Field • Knoxville, TN (rivalry)	**AUB** 6–0	15,000	
October 10	**Kentucky**	**Georgia Tech**	Grant Field • Atlanta, GA	**GT** 34–0	30,000	

=== Week Four ===
Date	Visiting team	Home team	Site	Result	Attendance	Ref.
October 16	Tennessee Wesleyan	**Sewanee**	Hardee Field • Sewanee, TN	**L** 7–19		
October 17	**Auburn**	Detroit	University of Detroit Stadium • Detroit, MI	**W** 6–0	10,000	
October 17	Loyola (LA)	**Mississippi State**	Ray Stadium • Meridian, MS	**W** 32–0		
October 17	Stetson	**Florida**	Florida Field • Gainesville, FL	**W** 32–0		
October 17	**Tulane**	Colgate	Polo Grounds • New York, NY	**W** 28–6	18,000	
October 17	**Kentucky**	Washington & Lee	Wilson Field • Lexington, VA	**W** 39–7		
October 17	Rice	**Georgia**	Sanford Stadium • Athens, GA	**L** 6–13		
October 17	**Georgia Tech**	Duke	Duke Stadium • Durham, NC	**L** 6–19	32,000	
October 17	**Vanderbilt**	SMU	Cotton Bowl • Dallas, TX	**L** 0–16	20,000	
October 17	**Ole Miss**	**LSU**	Tiger Stadium • Baton Rouge, LA (rivalry)	**LSU** 13–0		
October 17	**Tennessee**	**Alabama**	Legion Field • Birmingham, AL (rivalry)	0–0	15,000	

=== Week Five ===
Date	Visiting team	Home team	Site	Result	Attendance	Ref.
October 23	**Alabama**	Loyola (LA)	Loyola University Stadium • New Orleans, LA	**W** 13–6	6,000	
October 24	Arkansas	**LSU**	State Fair Stadium • Shreveport, LA (rivalry)	**W** 19–7	15,000	
October 24	Duke	**Tennessee**	Shields–Watkins Field • Knoxville, TN	**W** 15–13	13,263	
October 24	North Carolina	**Tulane**	Tulane Stadium • New Orleans, LA	**W** 21–7	18,000	
October 24	Catholic University	**Ole Miss**	Hemingway Stadium • Oxford, MS	**W** 14–0	6,000	
October 24	Tennessee Tech	**Sewanee**	Hardee Field • Sewanee, TN	**T** 0–0		
October 24	**Mississippi State**	TCU	Cotton Bowl • Dallas, TX	**T** 0–0	6,000	
October 24	**Auburn**	**Georgia**	Memorial Stadium • Columbus, GA (rivalry)	**AUB** 20–13		
October 24	**Florida**	**Kentucky**	McLean Stadium • Lexington, KY (rivalry)	**KEN** 7–0		
October 24	**Georgia Tech**	**Vanderbilt**	Dudley Field • Nashville, TN (rivalry)	0–0	10,000	

=== Week Six ===
Date	Visiting team	Home team	Site	Result	Attendance	Ref.
October 31	Louisiana Tech	**Tulane**	Tulane Stadium • New Orleans, LA	**W** 22–13	12,000	
October 31	Maryland	**Florida**	Florida Field • Gainesville, FL	**W** 7–6	14,000	
October 31	**Ole Miss**	Centenary	State Fair Stadium • Shreveport, LA	**W** 24–7	10,000	
October 31	**Auburn**	Santa Clara	Kezar Stadium • San Francisco, CA	**L** 0–12	25,000	
October 31	Clemson	**Georgia Tech**	Grant Field • Atlanta, GA (rivalry)	**L** 13–14	10,000	
October 31	**LSU**	**Vanderbilt**	Dudley Field • Nashville, TN	**LSU** 19–0	10,000	
October 31	**Alabama**	**Kentucky**	McLean Stadium • Lexington, KY	**ALA** 14–0	18,000	
October 31	**Tennessee**	**Georgia**	Sanford Stadium • Athens, GA	**TEN** 46–0		
October 31	**Sewanee**	**Mississippi State**	Municipal Stadium • Jackson, MS	**MSS** 68–0	4,000	

=== Week Seven ===
Date	Visiting team	Home team	Site	Result	Attendance	Ref.
November 7	Maryville (TN)	**Tennessee**	Shields–Watkins Field • Knoxville, TN	**W** 34–0	5,000	
November 7	Loyola (LA)	**Ole Miss**	Hemingway Stadium • Oxford, MS	**W** 34–0		
November 7	**Kentucky**	Manhattan	Ebbets Field • Brooklyn, NY	**L** 7–13		
November 7	**Mississippi State**	**LSU**	Tiger Stadium • Baton Rouge, LA (rivalry)	**LSU** 12–0	25,000	
November 7	**Tulane**	**Alabama**	Legion Field • Birmingham, AL	**ALA** 34–7	18,000	
November 7	**Auburn**	**Georgia Tech**	Grant Field • Atlanta, GA (rivalry)	**AUB** 12–13	18,000	
November 7	**Georgia**	**Florida**	Fairfield Stadium • Jacksonville, FL (rivalry)	**UGA** 26–8	17,000	
November 7	**Sewanee**	**Vanderbilt**	Dudley Field • Nashville, TN (rivalry)	**VAN** 14–0		

=== Week Eight ===
Date	Visiting team	Home team	Site	Result	Attendance	Ref.
November 14	Clemson	**Kentucky**	McLean Stadium • Lexington, KY	**W** 7–6		
November 14	**Ole Miss**	Marquette	Marquette Stadium • Milwaukee, WI	**L** 0–33	17,000	
November 14	**LSU**	**Auburn**	Legion Field • Birmingham, AL (rivalry)	**LSU** 19–6	24,000	
November 14	**Alabama**	**Georgia Tech**	Grant Field • Atlanta, GA (rivalry)	**ALA** 20–16	20,000	
November 14	**Tennessee**	**Vanderbilt**	Dudley Field • Nashville, TN (rivalry)	**TEN** 26–13	20,000	
November 14	**Georgia**	**Tulane**	Tulane Stadium • New Orleans, LA	**UGA** 12–6	18,000	
November 14	**Sewanee**	**Florida**	Florida Field • Gainesville, FL	**FLA** 18–7	4,000	

=== Week Nine ===
Date	Visiting team	Home team	Site	Result	Attendance	Ref.
November 21	Southwestern Louisiana	**LSU**	Tiger Stadium • Baton Rouge, LA	**W** 93–0	20,000	
November 21	Loyola (LA)	**Auburn**	Drake Field • Auburn, AL	**W** 44–0	5,000	
November 21	**Georgia**	Fordham	Polo Grounds • New York, NY	**T** 7–7	35,000	
November 21	**Ole Miss**	**Mississippi State**	Scott Field • Starkville, MS	**MSS** 26–6	20,000	
November 21	**Georgia Tech**	**Florida**	Grant Field • Atlanta, GA	**GT** 38–14	10,000	
November 21	**Sewanee**	**Tulane**	Tulane Stadium • New Orleans, LA	**TUL** 53–6	10,000	

=== Week Ten ===
Date	Visiting team	Home team	Site	Result	Attendance	Ref.
November 26	**Vanderbilt**	**Alabama**	Legion Field • Birmingham, AL	**ALA** 14–6	25,000	
November 26	**Kentucky**	**Tennessee**	Shields–Watkins Field • Knoxville, TN (rivalry)	**TEN** 7–6	20,000	
November 27	**Ole Miss**	Miami (FL)	Miami Stadium • Miami, FL	**W** 14–0	8,000	
November 28	Mercer	**Mississippi State**	Scott Field • Starkville, MS	**W** 32–0	3,500	
November 28	**Tulane**	**LSU**	Tiger Stadium • Baton Rouge, LA (rivalry)	**LSU** 33–0		
November 28	**Florida**	**Auburn**	Cramton Bowl • Montgomery, AL (rivalry)	**AUB** 13–0	6,000	
November 28	**Georgia Tech**	**Georgia**	Sanford Stadium • Athens, GA (rivalry)	**UGA** 16–6	23,000	

=== Week Eleven ===
Date	Visiting team	Home team	Site	Result	Attendance	Ref.
December 5	**Tennessee**	**Ole Miss**	Crump Stadium • Memphis, TN	0–0	17,000	
December 5	**Mississippi State**	**Florida**	Florida Field • Gainesville, FL	**MSS** 7–0	7,000	

=== Postseason ===
Date	Visiting team	Home team	Site	Result	Attendance	Ref.
December 26	California	**Georgia Tech**	Grant Field • Atlanta, GA	**W** 13–7	15,000	
January 1, 1937	Villanova	**Auburn**	La Tropical Stadium • Havana, Cuba (Bacardi Bowl)	**T** 7–7	6,000	
January 1, 1937	Santa Clara	**LSU**	Tulane Stadium • New Orleans, LA (Sugar Bowl)	**L** 14–21	38,483	
January 1, 1937	Duquesne	**Mississippi State**	Miami Stadium • Miami, FL (Orange Bowl)	**L** 12–13	9,210	

== All-conference players ==
The following players were recognized as consensus first-team honors from the Associated Press (AP) and United Press (UP) on the 1936 All-SEC football team:

- Gaynell Tinsley, End, LSU (AP-1, UP-1)
- Frank Kinard, Tackle, Ole Miss (AP-1, UP-1)
- Art White, Guard, Alabama (AP-1, UP-1)
- Walter Gilbert, Center, Auburn (AP-1, UP-1)
- Joe Riley, Quarterback, Alabama (AP-1, UP-1)
- Phil Dickens, Halfback, Tennessee (AP-1, UP-1)
- Howard Bryan, Halfback, Tulane (AP-1, UP-1)
- Marlon "Dutch" Konemann, Fullback, Georgia Tech (AP-1, UP-1)

== All-Americans ==
One SEC player was a consensus first-team pick on the 1936 College Football All-America Team:

- Gaynell Tinsley, End, LSU (AAB, AP, COL, INS, LIB, NANA, NEA, SN, UP)

Other SEC players receiving All-American honors from at least one selector were:

- Frank Kinard, Tackle, Mississippi (AAB; AP-3; INS-1; WC-1)
- Bill Moss, Tackle, Tulane (CP-2)
- Clarence Strange, Tackle, LSU (INS-2)
- Art White, Guard, Alabama (AP-2; CP-1; SN; INS-3)
- Walter Gilbert, Center, Auburn (AP-3; INS-3)
- Joe Riley, Halfback, Alabama (CP-1; INS-2)
- Phil Dickens, Halfback, Tennessee (AP-3)

== Head coaches ==
Records through the completion of the 1936 season

Team	Head coach	Years at school	Overall record	Record at school	SEC record
Alabama	Frank Thomas	6	74–15–4 (.817)	48–6–3 (.868)	21–2–2 (.880)
Auburn	Jack Meagher	3	43–38–2 (.530)	17–12–2 (.581)	10–9–1 (.525)
Florida	Josh Cody	1	43–36–1 (.544)	4–6–0 (.400)	1–5–0 (.167)
Georgia	Harry Mehre	9	53–31–4 (.625)	53–31–4 (.625)	11–10–0 (.524)
Georgia Tech	William Alexander	17	86–65–11 (.565)	86–65–11 (.565)	8–18–1 (.315)
Kentucky	Chet A. Wynne	3	77–54–9 (.582)	16–13–0 (.552)	5–9–0 (.357)
LSU	Bernie Moore	2	30–15–4 (.653)	18–3–1 (.841)	11–0–0 (1.000)
Mississippi State	Ralph Sasse	2	40–11–3 (.769)	15–6–1 (.705)	5–5–0 (.500)
Ole Miss	Ed Walker	7	34–33–7 (.507)	34–33–7 (.507)	7–9–3 (.447)
Sewanee	Harry E. Clark	6	15–36–3 (.306)	15–36–3 (.306)	0–21–0 (.000)
Tennessee	Robert Neyland	10	82–11–7 (.855)	82–11–7 (.855)	13–4–2 (.737)
Tulane	Red Dawson	1	6–3–1 (.650)	6–3–1 (.650)	2–3–1 (.417)
Vanderbilt	Ray Morrison	3	98–54–23 (.626)	14–10–1 (.580)	6–4–1 (.591)

== 1937 NFL draft ==
The following SEC players were selected in the 1937 NFL draft:

Round	Overall pick	Player name	School	Position	NFL team
2	12	Gaynell Tinsley	LSU	End	Chicago Cardinals
2	14	Art White	Alabama	Back	New York Giants
2	18	Marvin Stewart	LSU	Back	Chicago Bears
3	28	Dick Plasman	Vanderbilt	Back	Chicago Bears
4	31	Walter Gilbert	Auburn	Back	Philadelphia Eagles
4	32	Bucky Bryan	Tulane	Offensive guard	Chicago Cardinals
5	42	Bert Johnson	Kentucky	Tackle	Brooklyn Dodgers
6	52	Phil Dickens	Tennessee	Tackle	Chicago Cardinals
7	64	Buster Poole	Ole Miss	End	New York Giants
8	74	Gene Meyers	Kentucky	Back	New York Giants
8	76	Joel Eaves	Auburn	End	Washington Redskins
10	92	Middleton Fitzsimmons	Georgia Tech	Offensive Guard	Chicago Cardinals
10	94	Chuck Gelatka	Mississippi State	End	New York Giants
10	95	Stan Nevers	Kentucky	Tackle	Pittsburgh Pirates
