= 1936 Alabama Crimson Tide football team =

American college football season

1936 Alabama Crimson Tide football
- Conference: Southeastern Conference

Ranking
- AP: No. 4
- Record: 8–0–1 (5–0–1 SEC)
- Head coach: Frank Thomas (6th season)
- Captain: James Nesbit
- Home stadium: Denny Stadium; Legion Field

1936 Southeastern Conference football standings
	Conf.					Overall
Team	W		L		T	W		L		T
No. 2 LSU $	6	–	0	–	0	9	–	1	–	1
No. 4 Alabama	5	–	0	–	1	8	–	0	–	1
Auburn	4	–	1	–	1	7	–	2	–	2
No. 17 Tennessee	3	–	1	–	2	6	–	2	–	2
Mississippi State	3	–	2	–	0	7	–	3	–	1
Georgia	3	–	3	–	0	5	–	4	–	1
Georgia Tech	3	–	3	–	1	5	–	5	–	1
Tulane	2	–	3	–	1	6	–	3	–	1
Vanderbilt	1	–	3	–	1	3	–	5	–	1
Kentucky	1	–	3	–	0	6	–	4	–	0
Florida	1	–	5	–	0	4	–	6	–	0
Ole Miss	0	–	3	–	1	5	–	5	–	2
Sewanee	0	–	5	–	0	0	–	6	–	1
$ – Conference champion

The 1936 Alabama Crimson Tide football team (variously "Alabama", "UA" or "Bama") represented the University of Alabama in the 1936 college football season. It was the Crimson Tide's 43rd overall and 4th season as a member of the Southeastern Conference (SEC). The team was led by head coach Frank Thomas, in his sixth year, and played their home games at Denny Stadium in Tuscaloosa and Legion Field in Birmingham, Alabama. They finished the season with a record of eight wins, zero losses, and one tie (8–0–1 overall, 5–0–1 in the SEC).

After Alabama opened the season with three consecutive shutouts against Howard, Clemson and Mississippi State, they suffered their only blemish of the season, a scoreless tie against Tennessee. The Crimson Tide rebounded to win their final five games against Loyola, Kentucky, Tulane, Georgia Tech, and Vanderbilt. Although they finished undefeated and ranked No. 4 in the final AP Poll, Alabama did not receive an invitation to participate in a postseason bowl game.

== Schedule ==
Date	Opponent	Rank	Site	Result	Attendance	Source
September 26	Howard (AL)*		Denny Stadium; Tuscaloosa, AL	W 34–0	8,000	
October 3	Clemson*		Denny Stadium; Tuscaloosa, AL (rivalry)	W 32–0	6,000	
October 10	Mississippi State^{†}		Denny Stadium; Tuscaloosa, AL (rivalry)	W 7–0	17,000	
October 17	Tennessee		Legion Field; Birmingham, AL (rivalry)	T 0–0	15,000	
October 23	at Loyola (LA)*		Loyola University Stadium; New Orleans, LA	W 13–6	6,000	
October 31	at Kentucky		McLean Stadium; Lexington, KY	W 14–0	18,000	
November 7	No. 10 Tulane	No. 14	Legion Field; Birmingham, AL	W 34–7	18,000	
November 14	at Georgia Tech	No. 4	Grant Field; Atlanta, GA (rivalry)	W 20–16	20,000	
November 26	Vanderbilt	No. 3	Legion Field; Birmingham, AL	W 14–6	25,000	
*Non-conference game; ^{†}Homecoming; Rankings from AP Poll released prior to the game

== Game summaries ==
=== Howard (AL) ===
Team	1	2	3	4	Total
Howard	0	0	0	0	0
• Alabama	0	6	14	14	34

- Date: September 26
- Location: Denny Stadium
  Tuscaloosa, AL
- Game attendance: 8,000

To open the 1936 season, Alabama outgained Howard (now Samford University) in total yards, 294 to 12, and defeated the Bulldogs 34–0 at Denny Stadium. After a scoreless first, Joe Kilgrow scored on a four-yard touchdown run to give the Crimson Tide a 6–0 lead. Alabama then scored two touchdowns in each of the final two quarters to secure the 34–0 victory. Joe Riley scored both third-quarter touchdowns, the first on a 27-yard run and the second on a 26-yard run. Kilgrow then scored both of the fourth-quarter touchdowns on a pair of one-yard runs.

=== Clemson ===
Team	1	2	3	4	Total
Clemson	0	0	0	0	0
• Alabama	12	7	7	6	32

- Date: October 3
- Location: Denny Stadium
  Tuscaloosa, AL
- Game attendance: 6,000

For the second week in a row Alabama shutout their opponent, and this time it was the Clemson Tigers of the Southern Conference 32–0 in Tuscaloosa. The Crimson Tide took a 12–0 lead in the first quarter on touchdown runs of 15 yards by Gene Blackwell and of five-yards by Herman Caldwell. They would then score a touchdown in each of the three remaining quarters for the 32–0 margin. The touchdown runs were scored by Charlie Holm in the second on a three-yard run, by Young Boozer in the third on a 39-yard run and finally by Joe Kilgrow in the fourth on a five-yard run.

=== Mississippi State ===
Team	1	2	3	4	Total
Mississippi State	0	0	0	0	0
• Alabama	0	7	0	0	7

- Date: October 10
- Location: Denny Stadium
  Tuscaloosa, AL
- Game attendance: 17,000

The Crimson Tide entered their annual game against their long-time rival, Mississippi State as a slight underdog that sought redemption against the Maroons after their 20–7 loss the previous year. In what was Alabama's annual homecoming game, they defeated the Maroons 7–0 at Denny Stadium. In a game dominated by both defenses, the only points of the game came in the second quarter. The touchdown was scored by Joe Kilgrow after he received a lateral pass from Joe Riley on a fake punt and returned it 83-yards for the score. The Alabama defense also starred and made eight interceptions of State passes in the game.

=== Tennessee ===
Third Saturday in October

Team	1	2	3	4	Total
Tennessee	0	0	0	0	0
Alabama	0	0	0	0	0

- Date: October 17
- Location: Legion Field
  Birmingham, AL
- Game attendance: 15,000

Against rival Tennessee, Alabama battled the Volunteers to a 0–0 tie at Legion Field. In a game once again dominated by both defenses, the closest either team came to a score was at the end of the second quarter when Alabama was in position for a touchdown at the Tennessee one-yard line. However, the official call time for the end of the period before Alabama could get another play off.

=== Loyola ===
Team	1	2	3	4	Total
• Alabama	6	0	7	0	13
Loyola	6	0	0	0	6

- Date: October 23
- Location: Loyola Stadium
  New Orleans, LA
- Game attendance: 6,000

In what was the first road game of the season, Alabama made their first trip to New Orleans since the 1921 season and defeated the Loyola Wolfpack of the Dixie Conference 13–6 on a Friday evening. After each team traded punts to start the game, Loyola scored first on a one-yard touchdown run by Clay Calhoun to take a 6–0 lead. Alabama responded on the third play of the drive that ensued when Joe Kilgrow threw a 20-yard pass to Erin Warren that was run an additional 42-yards for a 62-yard touchdown and tied the game at 6–6. After a scoreless second, Alabama scored the game-winning touchdown in the third after they received the ball at the Wolfpack 36-yard line due to a short punt. On this drive, Joe Riley threw an 18-yard touchdown pass to James Nesbit to secure the win in what was Alabama's only all-time game against Loyola.

=== Kentucky ===
Team	1	2	3	4	Total
• Alabama	0	0	7	7	14
Kentucky	0	0	0	0	0

- Date: October 31
- Location: McLean Stadium
  Lexington, KY
- Game attendance: 18,000

On what was their homecoming game, Alabama defeated the Kentucky Wildcats 14–0 at McLean Stadium. After a scoreless first half that saw the Kentucky defense hold Alabama out of the endzone on four occasions from within their own ten-yard line, the Crimson Tide scored two second half touchdowns to win the game. Joe Riley scored both Alabama touchdowns on a 27-yard run in the third and on a 21-yard reverse in the fourth.

=== Tulane ===
Team	1	2	3	4	Total
#10 Tulane	7	0	0	0	7
• #14 Alabama	14	7	7	6	34

- Date: November 7
- Location: Legion Field
  Birmingham, AL
- Game attendance: 18,000

In what was the first game Alabama was ranked and played against a ranked opponent, the Crimson Tide defeated the Tulane Green Wave 34–7 at Legion Field. The Greenies scored first on a 42-yard, Bill Mathis touchdown run in the first quarter to take an early 7–0 lead. However, Alabama responded with five unanswered touchdowns to win the game 34–7. In the first quarter, the Crimson Tide scored on a 54-yard Joe Riley touchdown run and followed that with a 17-yard Joe Kilgrow touchdown pass to Perron Shoemaker to give Alabama a 14–7 lead after one. After Kilgrow threw his second touchdown pass of the game to Erin Warren in the second, James Nesbit scored on a two-yard run to give the Crimson Tide a 28–7 lead as they entered the fourth quarter. In the fourth, Alabama's final points were scored when Leroy Monsky intercepted a Tulane pass and returned it 25-yards for a touchdown.

This game was noted for being the first regular season Alabama game that was broadcast nationally on two major radio networks. It was broadcast by CBS with Ted Husing as the announcer and by NBC with Bill Slater as the announcer. The national broadcasts were made due to both teams being undefeated and ranked in the AP Poll as they entered the game. The game was also the first in which the Crimson Tide defeated a ranked opponent.

=== Georgia Tech ===
Team	1	2	3	4	Total
• #4 Alabama	7	13	0	0	20
Georgia Tech	0	0	9	7	16

- Date: November 14
- Location: Grant Field
  Atlanta, GA

Although outgained in total yardage against Georgia Tech, Alabama defeated the Yellow Jackets 20–16 at Grant Field. After the Crimson Tide scored on a Joe Kilgrow touchdown pass to Herman Caldwell in the first, Alabama scored two second-quarter touchdowns to take a 20–0 halftime lead. In the second, James Nesbit scored on a two-yard run and Kilgrow threw a 13-yard touchdown pass to Perron Shoemaker. The Yellow Jackets scored their first points early in the third after Hal Hughes was tackled for a safety on a punt attempt. On the possession that ensued, T. F. Sims threw a 45-yard touchdown pass to M. J. Konemann to cut the Crimson Tide lead to 20–9. H. H. Appleby then scored the final points of the game with his short touchdown run in the fourth on a drive that featured a 71-yard run by Konemann.

=== Vanderbilt ===
Team	1	2	3	4	Total
Vanderbilt	6	0	0	0	6
• #3 Alabama	0	0	7	7	14

- Date: November 26
- Location: Legion Field
  Birmingham, AL
- Game attendance: 25,000

In the season finale on Thanksgiving Day, Alabama defeated the Vanderbilt Commodores 14–6 defeat at Legion Field. Vanderbilt scored first after the received the opening kickoff when Herbert Plasman scored on a ten-yard touchdown on their opening drive. With the score still 6–0 in favor of the Commodores after halftime, the Crimson Tide scored a pair of second half touchdowns to win the game 14–6. In the third, Joe Kilgrow threw a 26-yard touchdown pass to Ben McLeod, and in the fourth a 12-yard Joe Riley touchdown pass to Kilgrow.

== After the season ==
Following their victory over Vanderbilt in the season finale, Alabama was in contention (along with Pittsburgh and LSU) for a place in the 1937 Rose Bowl opposite Washington. In addition to the Rose, Alabama was also under consideration to compete in the 1937 Sugar Bowl along with the aforementioned Pittsburgh, LSU and Santa Clara. However, on December 3, Rose Bowl officials announced the selection of Pittsburgh and Sugar Bowl officials announced their matchup of LSU and Santa Clara. This resulted in Alabama not playing in a bowl game despite an undefeated record of 8–0–1 and a final poll ranking of No. 4.

=== Awards ===
After the season, James Nesbit and Arthur "Tarzan" White selected to various 1936 College Football All-America Teams.

=== NFL draft ===
Several players who were varsity lettermen from the 1936 squad were drafted into the National Football League (NFL) between the 1937 and 1939 drafts. These players included the following:

Year	Round	Overall	Player name	Position	NFL team
1937	2	14	Arthur White	Back	New York Giants
1938	2	13	Joe Kilgrow	Back	Brooklyn Dodgers
1938	7	53	Leroy Monsky	Guard	Brooklyn Dodgers
1939	9	73	Lew Bostick	Guard	Cleveland Rams

== Personnel ==
The 1936 coaching staff included former player Bear Bryant in his first year in a coaching position. Bryant came back to Alabama after serving as an assistant coach at Union for their spring practices in early 1936. He later went on to serve as head coach at Maryland, Kentucky, Texas A&M and at Alabama. During his career Bryant won 323 games, appeared in 29 bowl games, won 15 conference championships and six national championships.

=== Varsity letter winners ===
Player	Hometown	Position
Young Boozer	Dothan, Alabama	Halfback
Lewis Bostick	Birmingham, Alabama	Guard
Vic Bradford	Memphis, Tennessee	Quarterback
Herman Caldwell	Tallassee, Alabama	Back
Joe Kilgrow	Montgomery, Alabama	Halfback
Ben McLeod	Leeksville, Mississippi	Halfback
Leroy Monsky	Montgomery, Alabama	Guard
Lamar Moyle	Decatur, Alabama	Center
James Nisbet	Bainbridge, Georgia	Fullback
William Peters	Hammond, Indiana	Guard
James Radford	Hartford, Alabama	Tackle
Joe Riley	Dothan, Alabama	Halfback
Hayward Sanford	Plainview, Arkansas	End
Joe Shepherd	Tuscaloosa, Alabama	Guard
Jim Tipton	Blytheville, Arkansas	Tackle
Hilmon Walker	Hattiesburg, Mississippi	End
Arthur "Tarzan" White	Atmore, Alabama	Guard
Bill Young	Pine Bluff, Arkansas	Tackle

=== Coaching staff ===
Name	Position	Seasons at Alabama	Alma mater
Frank Thomas	Head coach	6	Notre Dame (1923)
Bear Bryant	Assistant coach	1	Alabama (1935)
Paul Burnum	Assistant coach	7	Alabama (1922)
Hank Crisp	Assistant coach	16	VPI (1920)
Tilden Campbell	Assistant coach	1	Alabama (1935)
Jim Dildy	Assistant coach	2	Alabama (1934)
Harold Drew	Assistant coach	6	Bates (1916)
