= Boyd Brumbaugh =

American football player (1915–1988)

- Brumbaugh in 1936

No. 8, 10
- Position: Halfback

Personal information
- Born: August 24, 1915; Springdale, Pennsylvania, U.S.
- Died: April 5, 1988 (aged 72); Pittsburgh, Pennsylvania, U.S.
- Listed height: 5 ft 11 in (1.80 m)
- Listed weight: 195 lb (88 kg)

Career information
- High school: Munhall (PA) Steel Valley
- College: Duquesne
- NFL draft: 1938: 1st round, 3rd overall pick

Career history
- Brooklyn Dodgers (1938–1939); Pittsburgh Pirates / Steelers (1939–1941)

Awards and highlights
- NEA All-America honorable mention (1936); Second-team All-Eastern (1936)

Career NFL statistics
- Rushing yards: 727
- Rushing average: 2.8
- Receptions: 8
- Receiving yards: 101
- Touchdowns: 6
- Passing yards: 427
- TD–INT: 4-10
- Stats at Pro Football Reference

Urban Boyd Brumbaugh, Jr. (August 24, 1915 – April 5, 1988) was an American professional football player in the National Football League (NFL) for the Brooklyn Dodgers and Art Rooney's Pittsburgh franchise, renamed from the Pirates to the Steelers during Brumbaugh's time with the team.

== College career ==
Prior to his professional career, Brumbaugh played college football at Duquesne University from 1935 to 1937, where he received post-season honors including being named an honorable mention to the All-America team selected by the writers of the Newspaper Enterprise Association in 1936. In that year, Brumbaugh had led the Dukes to a 7–0 victory over the Pittsburgh Panthers, Pitt's only loss of the season in a National Championship campaign.

The 7–2 Dukes were tapped for the 1937 Orange Bowl following the 1936 season, where the defeated Mississippi State by a score of 13–12. In that game Brumbaugh played the hero's role, launching a pass with just three minutes left in the game that traveled 68 yards in the air for what would prove to be the winning touchdown.

== Professional career ==
Brumbaugh plows through the Philadelphia Eagles line to score a touchdown for the Steelers, September 21, 1941.

Deemed a top professional prospect, Brumbaugh was taken third overall in the first round of the 1938 NFL draft. He was drafted by the Dodgers from 1938 to 1939. During the 1939 season, he was traded to the Pirates-Steelers, where he played from 1939 to 1941.

Brumbaugh was regarded as the leading offensive threat of the Steelers during his tenure with that team, characterized as a multiple-threat athlete that could run, pass, and punt very well while possessing above average blocking skills. In this era of limited substitution and the one-platoon system, he was also judged to be a more than capable in the defensive halfback position, a player whose "favorite trick is intercepting enemy tosses."

While playing professionally Brumbaugh worked in the off-season as a boilermaker.

== Life after football ==
Brumbaugh retired from football in 1942 and worked as a wastewater engineer, retiring from that career in 1979.

Brumbaugh died April 5, 1988, at Allegheny General Hospital in Pittsburgh of emphysema. He was 72 years old at the time of his death and was survived by his wife, Margaret Regina, a daughter and son, and seven grandchildren.

During his lifetime, Brumbaugh was inducted into the Duquesne Sports Hall of Fame, the Curbstone Coaches Hall of Fame, the Western Pennsylvania Hall of Fame, and the Pennsylvania Sports Hall of Fame.
