= Kevin Daft =

American football player and coach (born 1975)

Dartmouth Big Green
- Title: Tight ends coach

Personal information
- Born: November 19, 1975 (age 50); Tustin, California, U.S.
- Listed height: 6 ft 1 in (1.85 m)
- Listed weight: 207 lb (94 kg)

Career information
- High school: Foothill (North Tustin, California)
- College: UC Davis
- NFL draft: 1999: 5th round, 151st overall pick

Career history

Playing
- Tennessee Titans (1999); Scottish Claymores (2000); Tennessee Titans (2000)*; San Diego Chargers (2000); Atlanta Falcons (2000)*; San Francisco 49ers (2001); Amsterdam Admirals (2002); Tennessee Titans (2002)*; San Jose SaberCats (2003); Indiana Firebirds (2004)
- * Offseason or practice squad member only

Coaching
- UC Davis (2003) Volunteer assistant; California (2004–2006) Graduate assistant; California (2007) Quarterbacks coach; California (2008–2010) Wide receivers coach; Omaha Nighthawks (2011) Wide receivers coach; UC Davis (2012) Co-offensive coordinator & wide receivers coach; UC Davis (2013–2016) Offensive coordinator & quarterbacks coach; Dartmouth (2017–2024) Offensive coordinator & quarterbacks coach; Dartmouth (2025–present) Quarterbacks coach

Awards and highlights
- NFLE records: Career passing touchdowns: 34

Career AFL statistics
- TD–INT: 3–1
- Passing yards: 135
- Completion percentage: 63.6
- Passer rating: 95.83
- Stats at ArenaFan.com

Kevin Daft (born November 19, 1975) is an American college football coach and former quarterback. He is the tight ends coach for Dartmouth College. He was selected by the Tennessee Titans in the fifth round of the 1999 NFL draft. He played college football at UC Davis.

Daft was also a member of the Scottish Claymores, San Diego Chargers, Atlanta Falcons, San Francisco 49ers, Amsterdam Admirals, San Jose SaberCats and Indiana Firebirds.

== College career ==
=== UC Davis ===
A two-time captain and All-American quarterback at UC Davis, Daft set five NCAA Division II records while throwing for 7,601 yards and 68 touchdowns in his collegiate career. He was a finalist for the Harlon Hill Trophy, the Division II version of the Heisman Trophy, and was inducted into the Cal Aggie Athletics Hall of Fame in 2005. He graduated from UC Davis with a degree in biology in 1999.

== Professional career ==
=== Tennessee Titans ===
Daft was drafted by the Tennessee Titans in the fifth round of the 1999 NFL Draft, and was the third quarterback with the team behind Steve McNair, and Neil O'Donnell, during its run to the 1999 AFC Championship and Super Bowl XXXIV.

=== San Diego Chargers ===
On November 28, 2000, Daft was released by the Chargers. He was re-signed to the San Diego Chargers practice squad along with Armon Hatcher on November 29, 2000.

=== Atlanta Falcons ===
On December 13, 2000, the Atlanta Falcons added Daft to their practice squad after placing Jammi German on injured reserve and releasing Marc Bulger. He was re-signed to a future contract on December 27, 2000. Daft was waived on April 25, 2001.

=== San Francisco 49ers ===
Daft was signed by the San Francisco 49ers on September 4, 2001, after the team released Rick Mirer. He was waived on September 12, 2001, to make room for Ricky Ray.

=== Second stint with Titans ===
After having workouts with the Houston Texans, Daft re-signed with the Tennessee Titans on February 6, 2002, and was immediately allocated to the Amsterdam Admirals. With the Admirals, Daft set an NFL Europe record by throwing for 30 career touchdown passes. Daft also set a league record for highest passer rating with a rating of 107.3. Even after setting the records, Daft was still released by the Titans on August 14, 2002.

=== Washington Redskins ===
Daft was invited to tryout with the Washington Redskins because rookie quarterbacks Gibran Hamdan and Brad Banks were ineligible to participate in the mini-camp. After the camp he was not signed by the Redskins.

=== Indiana Firebirds ===
After his stint with the San Jose SaberCats, Daft joined the Indiana Firebirds. He was named the starter beating out Tony Zimmerman and Adrian McPherson. On February 7, 2004, he suffered a head and arm injury and was placed on injured reserve on February 12, 2004, John Turman was signed to take his place on the roster.

== Coaching career ==
Daft joined the California football program as a graduate assistant in 2004 and worked with the offensive line in 2006. He became the quarterbacks coach in 2007, then moved to coaching wide receivers in 2008, a position he held until he was fired on December 17, 2010.

Daft was named wide receivers coach of the Omaha Nighthawks on March 8, 2011.
