= Duquesne Dukes football =

American football team of Duquesne University

2026 Duquesne Dukes football team
- First season: 1891; 135 years ago
- Athletic director: Dave Harper
- Head coach: Jerry Schmitt; 21st season, 135–92 (.595)
- Location: Pittsburgh, Pennsylvania
- Stadium: Arthur J. Rooney Athletic Field (capacity: 2,200)
- NCAA division: Division I FCS
- Conference: NEC
- Colors: Red and blue
- All-time record: 420–317–18 (.568)
- Bowl record: 5–4 (.556)

National championships
- Claimed: 1941

Conference championships
- MAAC: 1995, 1996, 1999, 2000, 2001, 2002, 2003, 2004, 2005, 2006, 2007 NEC: 2011, 2013, 2015, 2016, 2018, 2023, 2024, 2026
- Fight song: "The Victory Song (Red and Blue)"
- Mascot: Duquesne
- Website: goduquesne.com

The Duquesne Dukes football program is the intercollegiate American football team for Duquesne University located in the U.S. state of Pennsylvania. The team competes in the NCAA Division I Football Championship Subdivision (FCS) and is a member of the Northeast Conference (NEC). Duquesne has played as a club team from 1891 to 1894, 1896 to 1903, 1913 to 1914, and 1920 to 1928, as a National Collegiate Athletic Association (NCAA) member from 1929 to 1942 and 1947 to 1950, again as a club team from 1969 to 1978, in NCAA Division III from 1979 to 1992, and in the NCAA Division I FCS from 1993 to present.

Duquesne has won or shared 18 conference championships, all since 1995. The Dukes have qualified for the NCAA Division I Football Championship playoffs three times, earning automatic bids as NEC champion in 2015, 2018, and 2023.

The team plays its home games at the 2,200-seat Arthur J. Rooney Athletic Field in Pittsburgh, the smallest stadium for football in Division I. Jerry Schmitt has served as head coach for the Dukes since 2005.

== History ==
The Dukes started play in 1891 and have had a continuous program since 1969. They were Northeast Conference co-champions in 2011, 2013, 2016, 2018 and 2024 and outright champions in 2015 and 2023. Previously, Duquesne football was a member of the Metro Atlantic Athletic Conference, winning or sharing 11 conference titles.

Duquesne was the ECAC Bowl champions in both 1995 and 2003 and NCAA Division I FCS Mid-Major national champions in 2003. Duquesne was rated #1 in NCAA Division I by the Massey Ratings for the 1941 season and won a NCFA Club National Championship in 1973 after the program was revived in 1969 by then student-athlete Sam Costanzo in cooperation with university administration.

Duquesne is noted for establishing numerous firsts in collegiate football. Former head coach Elmer Layden is credited with devising the system of hand signals that officials use today. The signal system was put to use for the first time on November 11, 1928, when Duquesne hosted Thiel College at Pitt Stadium. Layden was also the first coach to use two sets of uniform jerseys for home and away contests. In 1929, graduate student manager John Holohan conceived the idea of the first night game at Pittsburgh's Forbes Field. On the evening of November 1 that year, the Dukes made history by defeating Geneva College, 27–7, in front of more than 27,000 spectators. This led to the Duquesne Football team's nickname "the Night Riders."

At the club level, Duquesne won the 1973 National Club Football Association national championship at Three Rivers Stadium and was runner-up in 1977.

The Dukes football team also boasts the greatest all-time intraconference winning streak (Note: tied with the University of San Diego) in NCAA Division I FCS history with 39 straight wins in the MAAC. The 39-game streak also ties for the second-longest intraconference winning streak in NCAA Division I football history, five games shy of the all-time record.

Duquesne defeated Ohio University in the fall of 2021 for the program's first victory over a Football Bowl Subdivision opponent since the divisions were created in 1978.

Duquesne defenders converge on an Air Force ball-carrier during a game in 2026

== Conference championships ==
Year	Conference	Coach	Overall record	Conference record
1995	MAAC	Greg Gattuso	10–1	7–0
1996	MAAC	Greg Gattuso	10–1	8–0
1999	MAAC	Greg Gattuso	8–3	7–1
2000	MAAC	Greg Gattuso	10–1	7–0
2001	MAAC	Greg Gattuso	8–3	6–0
2002	MAAC	Greg Gattuso	11–1	8–0
2003	MAAC	Greg Gattuso	8–3	5–0
2004	MAAC	Greg Gattuso	7–3	4–0
2005	MAAC	Jerry Schmitt	7–3	4–0
2006†	MAAC	Jerry Schmitt	7–3	3–1
2007†	MAAC	Jerry Schmitt	6–4	2–1
2011†	NEC	Jerry Schmitt	9–2	7–1
2013†	NEC	Jerry Schmitt	7–4	4–2
2015	NEC	Jerry Schmitt	8–4	5–1
2016†	NEC	Jerry Schmitt	8–3	5–1
2018†	NEC	Jerry Schmitt	9–4	5–1
2023	NEC	Jerry Schmitt	7–5	6–1
2024†	NEC	Jerry Schmitt	8–3	5–1
2026†	NEC	Jerry Schmitt	6–5	5–2

† Co-champions

== Postseason record ==
=== Major bowl games ===
The Dukes had some success before NCAA college football was aligned into divisions. Duquesne won the 1934 Festival of Palms Bowl and 1937 Orange Bowl. The Dukes turned down invitations from the Cotton Bowl, Sun Bowl, and Olympic Bowl in 1939.

Season	Date	Head coach	Bowl	Opponent	Result
1933	January 1, 1934	Elmer Layden	Festival of Palms Bowl	Miami (FL)	W 33–7
1936	January 1, 1937	Clipper Smith	Orange Bowl	Mississippi State	W 13–12

=== AP Poll appearances ===
From 1933 to 1942, Duquesne was among the elite college football teams in the United States, garnering the sixth-highest winning percentage (71–22–2, .762) in the nation behind Alabama, Tennessee, Duke, Fordham and Notre Dame. In 1941, Duquesne finished the season undefeated and untied, earning a No. 8 Associated Press ranking while leading the nation in scoring defense, rushing defense and total defense. (Note: Duquesne also led all of NCAA Division I football in scoring defense and total defense in 2002 and rushing defense, passing defense and total defense in 2005. The Dukes led the FCS in scoring defense in 1996.)

- October 19, 1936 #11
- November 16, 1936 #20
- November 23, 1936 #12
- November 30, 1936 #14 FINAL
- November 1, 1937 #16
- October 23, 1939 #11
- October 30, 1939 #13
- November 6, 1939 #12
- November 13, 1939 #10
- November 20, 1939 #20
- November 27, 1939 #6
- December 4, 1939 #10
- December 11, 1939 #10 FINAL
- October 27, 1941 #16
- November 3, 1941 #12
- November 10, 1941 #10
- November 17, 1941 #6
- November 24, 1941 #5
- December 1, 1941 #8 FINAL
- October 12, 1942 #13

=== FCS playoff results ===
The Dukes have made three appearances in the FCS Playoffs. Their combined record is 1–3.

Year	Round	Opponent	Result
2015	First Round	William & Mary	L, 49–52
2018	First Round; Second Round	Towson; South Dakota State	W, 31–10; L, 6–51
2023	First Round	Youngstown State	L, 7–40

== Notable players ==
- Leigh Bodden
- Art Rooney
- Dan Rooney
- Aldo Donelli
- Mike Basrak
- Boyd Brumbaugh
- Ernie Hefferle
- Ayden Garnes
- Christian Kuntz
- Armand Niccolai
- Nick DeCarbo
- Al DeMao
- Ray Kemp
- Vic Vidoni
- Tony Zimmerman

== Future non-conference opponents ==
Future non-conference opponents announced as of May 7, 2026.

2026	2027
at Air Force	at James Madison
at Youngstown State	at Michigan State
at Washington State	
Rio Grande (OH)	
