= 1936 Tulane Green Wave football team =

American college football season

1936 Tulane Green Wave football
- Conference: Southeastern Conference
- Record: 6–3–1 (2–3–1 SEC)
- Head coach: Red Dawson (1st season)
- Captain: William Moss
- Home stadium: Tulane Stadium

1936 Southeastern Conference football standings
	Conf.					Overall
Team	W		L		T	W		L		T
No. 2 LSU $	6	–	0	–	0	9	–	1	–	1
No. 4 Alabama	5	–	0	–	1	8	–	0	–	1
Auburn	4	–	1	–	1	7	–	2	–	2
No. 17 Tennessee	3	–	1	–	2	6	–	2	–	2
Mississippi State	3	–	2	–	0	7	–	3	–	1
Georgia	3	–	3	–	0	5	–	4	–	1
Georgia Tech	3	–	3	–	1	5	–	5	–	1
Tulane	2	–	3	–	1	6	–	3	–	1
Vanderbilt	1	–	3	–	1	3	–	5	–	1
Kentucky	1	–	3	–	0	6	–	4	–	0
Florida	1	–	5	–	0	4	–	6	–	0
Ole Miss	0	–	3	–	1	5	–	5	–	2
Sewanee	0	–	5	–	0	0	–	6	–	1
$ – Conference champion

The 1936 Tulane Green Wave football team was an American football team that represented Tulane University as a member of the Southeastern Conference (SEC) during the 1936 college football season. In its first year head coach Red Dawson, Tulane compiled a 6–3–1 record (2–3–1 in conference games), and outscored opponents by a total of 163 to 117.

The Green Wave played its home games at Tulane Stadium in New Orleans.

== Schedule ==
Date	Opponent	Rank	Site	Result	Attendance	Source
September 26	Ole Miss		Tulane Stadium; New Orleans, LA	W 7–6	18,000	
October 3	Auburn		Tulane Stadium; New Orleans, LA (rivalry)	T 0–0	18,000	
October 10	Centenary*		Tulane Stadium; New Orleans, LA	W 19–0	17,000	
October 17	vs. Colgate*		Polo Grounds; New York, NY	W 28–6	18,000	
October 24	North Carolina*	No. 18	Tulane Stadium; New Orleans, LA	W 21–7	18,000	
October 31	Louisiana Tech*	No. 9	Tulane Stadium; New Orleans, LA	W 22–13	12,000	
November 7	at No. 14 Alabama	No. 10	Legion Field; Birmingham, AL	L 7–34	18,000	
November 14	Georgia		Tulane Stadium; New Orleans, LA	L 6–12	18,000	
November 21	Sewanee		Tulane Stadium; New Orleans, LA	W 53–6	10,000	
November 28	at No. 2 LSU	No. 19	Tiger Stadium; Baton Rouge, LA (Battle for the Rag)	L 0–33	48,000	
*Non-conference game; Rankings from AP Poll released prior to the game

== Rankings ==
Ranking movements Legend: ██ Increase in ranking ██ Decrease in ranking — = Not ranked
	Week						
Poll	1	2	3	4	5	6	Final
AP	18	9	10	—	—	19	—
