= 1936 Kentucky Wildcats football team =

American college football season

1936 Kentucky Wildcats football
- Conference: Southeastern Conference
- Record: 6–4 (1–3 SEC)
- Head coach: Chet A. Wynne (3rd season)
- Captain: Stan Nevers
- Home stadium: McLean Stadium

1936 Southeastern Conference football standings
	Conf.					Overall
Team	W		L		T	W		L		T
No. 2 LSU $	6	–	0	–	0	9	–	1	–	1
No. 4 Alabama	5	–	0	–	1	8	–	0	–	1
Auburn	4	–	1	–	1	7	–	2	–	2
No. 17 Tennessee	3	–	1	–	2	6	–	2	–	2
Mississippi State	3	–	2	–	0	7	–	3	–	1
Georgia	3	–	3	–	0	5	–	4	–	1
Georgia Tech	3	–	3	–	1	5	–	5	–	1
Tulane	2	–	3	–	1	6	–	3	–	1
Vanderbilt	1	–	3	–	1	3	–	5	–	1
Kentucky	1	–	3	–	0	6	–	4	–	0
Florida	1	–	5	–	0	4	–	6	–	0
Ole Miss	0	–	3	–	1	5	–	5	–	2
Sewanee	0	–	5	–	0	0	–	6	–	1
$ – Conference champion

The 1936 Kentucky Wildcats football team was an American football team that represented the University of Kentucky as a member of the Southeastern Conference (SEC) during the 1936 college football season. In their third season under head coach Chet A. Wynne, the Wildcats compiled an overall record of 6–4 record with a mark of 1–3 against conference opponents, tied for ninth place in the SEC, and outscored opponents by a total of 179 to 84. The team played its home games at McLean Stadium in Lexington, Kentucky.

== Schedule ==
Date	Opponent	Site	Result	Attendance	Source
September 19	Maryville*	McLean Stadium; Lexington, KY	W 54–3		
September 25	at Xavier*	Corcoran Field; Cincinnati, OH	W 21–0	12,000	
October 3	VMI	McLean Stadium; Lexington, KY	W 38–0		
October 10	at Georgia Tech	Grant Field; Atlanta, GA	L 0–34	30,000	
October 17	at Washington & Lee*	Wilson Field; Lexington, VA	W 39–7		
October 24	Florida	McLean Stadium; Lexington, KY (rivalry)	W 7–0		
October 31	Alabama	McLean Stadium; Lexington, KY	L 0–14	18,000	
November 7	at Manhattan*	Ebbets Field; Brooklyn, NY	L 7–13		
November 14	Clemson*	McLean Stadium; Lexington, KY	W 7–6		
November 26	at No. 17 Tennessee	Shields–Watkins Field; Knoxville, TN (rivalry)	L 6–7	20,000	
*Non-conference game; Rankings from Coaches' Poll released prior to the game
