= 1936 Vanderbilt Commodores football team =

American college football season

1936 Vanderbilt Commodores football
- Conference: Southeastern Conference
- Record: 3–5–1 (1–3–1 SEC)
- Head coach: Ray Morrison (3rd season)
- Captain: Dick Plasman
- Home stadium: Dudley Field

1936 Southeastern Conference football standings
	Conf.					Overall
Team	W		L		T	W		L		T
No. 2 LSU $	6	–	0	–	0	9	–	1	–	1
No. 4 Alabama	5	–	0	–	1	8	–	0	–	1
Auburn	4	–	1	–	1	7	–	2	–	2
No. 17 Tennessee	3	–	1	–	2	6	–	2	–	2
Mississippi State	3	–	2	–	0	7	–	3	–	1
Georgia	3	–	3	–	0	5	–	4	–	1
Georgia Tech	3	–	3	–	1	5	–	5	–	1
Tulane	2	–	3	–	1	6	–	3	–	1
Vanderbilt	1	–	3	–	1	3	–	5	–	1
Kentucky	1	–	3	–	0	6	–	4	–	0
Florida	1	–	5	–	0	4	–	6	–	0
Ole Miss	0	–	3	–	1	5	–	5	–	2
Sewanee	0	–	5	–	0	0	–	6	–	1
$ – Conference champion

The 1936 Vanderbilt Commodores football team represented Vanderbilt University as a member of the Southeastern Conference (SEC) during the 1936 college football season. Led by third-year head coach Ray Morrison, the Commodores compiled an overall record of 3–5–1 with a mark of 1–3–1 in conference play, finishing ninth in the SEC. They played their six home games at Dudley Field in Nashville, Tennessee. Vanderbilt began the season by shutting out Middle Tennessee and Chicago, but did not score a point over the next four games before shutting Sewanee for their third win of the season. On October 17, the Commodores lost, 16–0, to the SMU Mustangs. Morrison had served as head coach for the Mustangs from 1922 to 1934.

== Schedule ==
Date	Opponent	Site	Result	Attendance	Source
September 26	Middle Tennessee State Teachers*	Dudley Field; Nashville, TN	W 45–0	7,000	
October 3	at Chicago*	Stagg Field; Chicago, IL	W 37–0	12,000	
October 10	Southwestern (TN)*	Dudley Field; Nashville, TN	L 0–12	5,000	
October 17	at SMU*	Cotton Bowl; Dallas, TX	L 0–16	20,000	
October 24	Georgia Tech	Dudley Field; Nashville, TN (rivalry)	T 0–0	10,000	
October 31	No. 8 LSU	Dudley Field; Nashville, TN	L 0–19	10,000	
November 7	Sewanee^{†}	Dudley Field; Nashville, TN (rivalry)	W 14–0		
November 14	Tennessee	Dudley Field; Nashville, TN (rivalry)	L 13–26	20,000	
November 25	at No. 3 Alabama	Legion Field; Birmingham, AL	L 6–14	25,000	
*Non-conference game; ^{†}Homecoming; Rankings from AP Poll released prior to the game
