= 1936 Sewanee Tigers football team =

American college football season

1936 Sewanee Tigers football
- Conference: Southeastern Conference
- Record: 0–6–1 (0–5 SEC)
- Head coach: Harry E. Clark (6th season)
- Home stadium: Hardee Field

1936 Southeastern Conference football standings
	Conf.					Overall
Team	W		L		T	W		L		T
No. 2 LSU $	6	–	0	–	0	9	–	1	–	1
No. 4 Alabama	5	–	0	–	1	8	–	0	–	1
Auburn	4	–	1	–	1	7	–	2	–	2
No. 17 Tennessee	3	–	1	–	2	6	–	2	–	2
Mississippi State	3	–	2	–	0	7	–	3	–	1
Georgia	3	–	3	–	0	5	–	4	–	1
Georgia Tech	3	–	3	–	1	5	–	5	–	1
Tulane	2	–	3	–	1	6	–	3	–	1
Vanderbilt	1	–	3	–	1	3	–	5	–	1
Kentucky	1	–	3	–	0	6	–	4	–	0
Florida	1	–	5	–	0	4	–	6	–	0
Ole Miss	0	–	3	–	1	5	–	5	–	2
Sewanee	0	–	5	–	0	0	–	6	–	1
$ – Conference champion

The 1936 Sewanee Tigers football team was an American football team that represented Sewanee: The University of the South as a member of the Southeastern Conference during the 1936 college football season. In their sixth season under head coach Harry E. Clark, Sewanee compiled a 0–6–1 record.

== Schedule ==
Date	Opponent	Site	Result	Attendance	Source
October 3	at Georgia Tech	Grant Field; Atlanta, GA	L 0–58	8,000	
October 16	Tennessee Wesleyan*	Hardee Field; Sewanee, TN	L 7–19		
October 24	Tennessee Tech*	Hardee Field; Sewanee, TN	T 0–0		
October 31	at Mississippi State	Municipal Stadium; Jackson, MS	L 0–68	4,000	
November 7	at Vanderbilt	Dudley Field; Nashville, TN (rivalry)	L 0–14		
November 14	at Florida	Florida Field; Gainesville, FL	L 7–18	4,000	
November 21	at Tulane	Tulane Stadium; New Orleans, LA	L 6–53	10,000	
*Non-conference game
