= 1936 Georgia Tech Yellow Jackets football team =

American college football season

1936 Georgia Tech Yellow Jackets football
- Conference: Southeastern Conference
- Record: 5–5–1 (3–3–1 SEC)
- Head coach: William Alexander (17th season)
- Offensive scheme: Single-wing
- Captain: Middleton Fitzsimmons
- Home stadium: Grant Field

1936 Southeastern Conference football standings
	Conf.					Overall
Team	W		L		T	W		L		T
No. 2 LSU $	6	–	0	–	0	9	–	1	–	1
No. 4 Alabama	5	–	0	–	1	8	–	0	–	1
Auburn	4	–	1	–	1	7	–	2	–	2
No. 17 Tennessee	3	–	1	–	2	6	–	2	–	2
Mississippi State	3	–	2	–	0	7	–	3	–	1
Georgia	3	–	3	–	0	5	–	4	–	1
Georgia Tech	3	–	3	–	1	5	–	5	–	1
Tulane	2	–	3	–	1	6	–	3	–	1
Vanderbilt	1	–	3	–	1	3	–	5	–	1
Kentucky	1	–	3	–	0	6	–	4	–	0
Florida	1	–	5	–	0	4	–	6	–	0
Ole Miss	0	–	3	–	1	5	–	5	–	2
Sewanee	0	–	5	–	0	0	–	6	–	1
$ – Conference champion

The 1936 Georgia Tech Yellow Jackets football team was an American football team that represented Georgia Tech as a member of the Southeastern Conference (SEC) during the 1936 college football season. In their 17th year under head coach William Alexander, the Yellow Jackets compiled an overall record of 5–5–1, with a conference record of 3–3–1, and finished seventh in the SEC.

== Schedule ==
Date	Opponent	Site	Result	Attendance	Source
September 25	Presbyterian*	Grant Field; Atlanta, GA	W 55–0		
October 3	Sewanee	Grant Field; Atlanta, GA	W 58–0	8,000	
October 10	Kentucky	Grant Field; Atlanta, GA	W 34–0	30,000	
October 17	at Duke*	Duke Stadium; Durham, NC	L 6–19	32,000	
October 24	at Vanderbilt	Dudley Field; Nashville, TN (rivalry)	T 0–0	10,000	
October 31	Clemson*	Grant Field; Atlanta, GA (rivalry)	L 13–14	11,000	
November 7	No. 20 Auburn	Grant Field; Atlanta, GA (rivalry)	L 12–13	18,000	
November 14	No. 4 Alabama	Grant Field; Atlanta, GA (rivalry)	L 16–20	20,000	
November 21	Florida	Grant Field; Atlanta, GA	W 38–14	10,000	
November 28	at Georgia	Sanford Stadium; Athens, GA (rivalry)	L 6–16	23,000	
December 26	California*	Grant Field; Atlanta, GA	W 13–7	15,000	
*Non-conference game; Rankings from AP Poll released prior to the game
