= 1936 Ole Miss Rebels football team =

American college football season

1936 Ole Miss Rebels football
- Conference: Southeastern Conference
- Record: 5–5–2 (0–3–1 SEC)
- Head coach: Ed Walker (7th season)
- Home stadium: Hemingway Stadium

1936 Southeastern Conference football standings
	Conf.					Overall
Team	W		L		T	W		L		T
No. 2 LSU $	6	–	0	–	0	9	–	1	–	1
No. 4 Alabama	5	–	0	–	1	8	–	0	–	1
Auburn	4	–	1	–	1	7	–	2	–	2
No. 17 Tennessee	3	–	1	–	2	6	–	2	–	2
Mississippi State	3	–	2	–	0	7	–	3	–	1
Georgia	3	–	3	–	0	5	–	4	–	1
Georgia Tech	3	–	3	–	1	5	–	5	–	1
Tulane	2	–	3	–	1	6	–	3	–	1
Vanderbilt	1	–	3	–	1	3	–	5	–	1
Kentucky	1	–	3	–	0	6	–	4	–	0
Florida	1	–	5	–	0	4	–	6	–	0
Ole Miss	0	–	3	–	1	5	–	5	–	2
Sewanee	0	–	5	–	0	0	–	6	–	1
$ – Conference champion

The 1936 Ole Miss Rebels football team was an American football team that represented the University of Mississippi in the Southeastern Conference during the 1936 college football season. In its seventh season under head coach Ed Walker, the team compiled a 5–5–2 record (0–3–1 against conference opponents). The team played home games at Hemingway Stadium in Oxford, Mississippi.

The team beat the Miami Hurricanes and tied Tennessee.

== Schedule ==
Date	Opponent	Site	Result	Attendance	Source
September 19	Union (TN)*	Hemingway Stadium; Oxford, MS	W 45–0		
September 26	at Tulane	Tulane Stadium; New Orleans, LA (rivalry)	L 6–7	18,000	
October 2	at Temple*	Temple Stadium; Philadelphia, PA	L 7–12		
October 9	at George Washington*	Griffith Stadium; Washington DC	T 0–0		
October 17	at LSU	Tiger Stadium; Baton Rouge, LA (rivalry)	L 0–13		
October 24	Catholic University*	Hemingway Stadium; Oxford, MS	W 14–0	6,000	
October 31	at Centenary*	State Fair Stadium; Shreveport, LA	W 24–7	10,000	
November 7	Loyola (LA)*	Hemingway Stadium; Oxford, MS	W 34–0		
November 14	at No. 8 Marquette*	Marquette Stadium; Milwaukee, WI	L 0–33	17,000	
November 21	at Mississippi State	Scott Field; Starkville, MS (Egg Bowl)	L 6–26	20,000	
November 27	at Miami (FL)*	Miami Stadium; Miami, FL	W 14–0	8,000	
December 5	vs. No. 17 Tennessee	Crump Stadium; Memphis, TN (rivalry)	T 0–0	17,000	
*Non-conference game; Rankings from AP Poll released prior to the game

== Roster ==
- E Buster Poole, Sr. Dave Bernard Halfback
