= 1936 Florida Gators football team =

American college football season

1936 Florida Gators football
- Conference: Southeastern Conference
- Record: 4–6 (1–5 SEC)
- Head coach: Josh Cody (1st season)
- Captain: Julian Lane
- Home stadium: Florida Field

1936 Southeastern Conference football standings
	Conf.					Overall
Team	W		L		T	W		L		T
No. 2 LSU $	6	–	0	–	0	9	–	1	–	1
No. 4 Alabama	5	–	0	–	1	8	–	0	–	1
Auburn	4	–	1	–	1	7	–	2	–	2
No. 17 Tennessee	3	–	1	–	2	6	–	2	–	2
Mississippi State	3	–	2	–	0	7	–	3	–	1
Georgia	3	–	3	–	0	5	–	4	–	1
Georgia Tech	3	–	3	–	1	5	–	5	–	1
Tulane	2	–	3	–	1	6	–	3	–	1
Vanderbilt	1	–	3	–	1	3	–	5	–	1
Kentucky	1	–	3	–	0	6	–	4	–	0
Florida	1	–	5	–	0	4	–	6	–	0
Ole Miss	0	–	3	–	1	5	–	5	–	2
Sewanee	0	–	5	–	0	0	–	6	–	1
$ – Conference champion

The 1936 Florida Gators football team represented the University of Florida during the 1936 college football season. The season was Josh Cody's first as the new head coach of the Florida Gators football team. The highlights of the season included a 32–0 shutout of Stetson, a homecoming game win over the Maryland (7–6), and the Gators' only conference victory, over Sewanee (18–7). But the season was also remembered for the Gators' three 7–0 shutout losses to South Carolina, Kentucky, and Mississippi State. Cody's 1936 Florida Gators finished 4–6 overall and 1–5 in the Southeastern Conference (SEC), placing tenth of thirteen SEC teams in the conference standings—Cody's worst SEC finish in four seasons as the Gators football coach.

== Schedule ==
Date	Opponent	Site	Result	Attendance	Source
October 3	The Citadel*	Florida Field; Gainesville, FL	W 20–14	5,000	
October 10	at South Carolina*	Columbia Municipal Stadium; Columbia, SC	L 0–7	4,000	
October 17	Stetson*	Florida Field; Gainesville, FL	W 32–0		
October 24	at Kentucky	McLean Stadium; Lexington, KY (rivalry)	L 0–7		
October 31	Maryland*^{†}	Florida Field; Gainesville, FL	W 7–6	14,000	
November 7	vs. Georgia	Fairfield Stadium; Jacksonville, FL (rivalry)	L 8–26	17,000	
November 14	Sewanee	Florida Field; Gainesville, FL	W 18–7	4,000	
November 21	at Georgia Tech	Grant Field; Atlanta, GA	L 14–38	10,000	
November 28	at Auburn	Cramton Bowl; Montgomery, AL (rivalry)	L 0–13	6,000	
December 5	Mississippi State	Florida Field; Gainesville, FL	L 0–7	7,000	
*Non-conference game; ^{†}Homecoming

== Postseason ==
Mayberry earned second-team All-Southeastern Conference honors at the conclusion of the season.
