= 1936 Georgia Bulldogs football team =

American college football season

1936 Georgia Bulldogs football
- Conference: Southeastern Conference
- Record: 5–4–1 (3–3 SEC)
- Head coach: Harry Mehre (9th season)
- Home stadium: Sanford Stadium

1936 Southeastern Conference football standings
	Conf.					Overall
Team	W		L		T	W		L		T
No. 2 LSU $	6	–	0	–	0	9	–	1	–	1
No. 4 Alabama	5	–	0	–	1	8	–	0	–	1
Auburn	4	–	1	–	1	7	–	2	–	2
No. 17 Tennessee	3	–	1	–	2	6	–	2	–	2
Mississippi State	3	–	2	–	0	7	–	3	–	1
Georgia	3	–	3	–	0	5	–	4	–	1
Georgia Tech	3	–	3	–	1	5	–	5	–	1
Tulane	2	–	3	–	1	6	–	3	–	1
Vanderbilt	1	–	3	–	1	3	–	5	–	1
Kentucky	1	–	3	–	0	6	–	4	–	0
Florida	1	–	5	–	0	4	–	6	–	0
Ole Miss	0	–	3	–	1	5	–	5	–	2
Sewanee	0	–	5	–	0	0	–	6	–	1
$ – Conference champion

The 1936 Georgia Bulldogs football team was an American football team that represented the University of Georgia as a member of the Southeastern Conference (SEC) during the 1936 college football season. In their ninth year under head coach Harry Mehre, the Bulldogs compiled an overall record of 5–4–1, with a conference record of 3–3, and finished sixth in the SEC.

== Schedule ==
Date	Opponent	Site	Result	Attendance	Source
September 26	Mercer*	Sanford Stadium; Athens, GA	W 15–6	7,000	
October 3	Furman*	Sanford Stadium; Athens, GA	W 13–0	4,001	
October 10	at LSU	Tiger Stadium; Baton Rouge, LA	L 7–37	25,000	
October 17	Rice*	Sanford Stadium; Athens, GA	L 6–13		
October 24	vs. Auburn	Memorial Stadium; Columbus, GA (rivalry)	L 13–20		
October 31	Tennessee^{†}	Sanford Stadium; Athens, GA (rivalry)	L 0–46		
November 7	vs. Florida	Fairfield Stadium; Jacksonville, FL (rivalry)	W 26–8	17,000	
November 14	at Tulane	Tulane Stadium; New Orleans, LA	W 12–6	18,000	
November 21	at Fordham*	Polo Grounds; New York, NY	T 7–7	35,000	
November 28	Georgia Tech	Sanford Stadium; Athens, GA (rivalry)	W 16–6	23,000	
*Non-conference game; ^{†}Homecoming
