= Tony Zimmerman =

American football player and coach

Profile
- Position: Quarterback

Personal information
- Born: April 22, 1977 (age 49); Trafford, Pennsylvania, U.S.
- Listed height: 6 ft 3 in (1.91 m)
- Listed weight: 225 lb (102 kg)

Career information
- High school: Penn-Trafford (Harrison City, Pennsylvania)
- College: Duquesne

Career history
- Quad City Steamwheelers (2002–2003); Indiana Firebirds (2004); Nashville Kats (2005); Johnstown Riverhawks (2005)

Awards and highlights
- af2 Offensive Player of the Year (2002)
- Stats at ArenaFan.com

Tony Zimmerman (born April 22, 1977) is an American former professional football quarterback who played in the Arena Football League (AFL). He played college football at Duquesne University.

== High school ==
Tony attended Penn-Trafford High School and was the Pittsburgh Post-Gazette's 1995 Player of the Year.

== College ==
Zimmerman originally attended University of Pittsburgh but transferred after his freshman year to Duquesene. He was a record-setting quarterback for the Dukes from the 1998–2000 season. He set 14 school records leading the Dukes to back to back MAAC titles in 1999 and 2000. He finished his career with 7,313 yards passing and 73 touchdown passes. He still holds the NCAA I-AA career record for highest percentage of passes for touchdowns. He was named Duquesne's male Student-Athlete of the Year in 2000–01.

== Professional career ==
In 2002, Zimmerman was a member of the Quad City Steamwheelers and was named af2's Offensive Player of the Year. He was re-signed by the team in 2003. In 2004, he was a member of the Indiana Firebirds. He played for the Nashville Kats in 2005. He was released by the Kats on March 31, 2005, after Leon Murray returned from injury. After being released he was signed in April by the Johnstown Riverhawks of the American Indoor Football Association.

== Coaching career ==
After his pro-career Zimmerman returned to Duquesne in 2005 and became the school's receivers coach even though he was still playing for the Johnstown Riverhawks. Zimmerman also coached at West Virginia Tech.
