= 1936 Tennessee Volunteers football team =

American college football season

1936 Tennessee Volunteers football
- Conference: Southeastern Conference

Ranking
- AP: No. 17
- Record: 6–2–2 (3–1–2 SEC)
- Head coach: Robert Neyland (10th season)
- Offensive scheme: Single-wing
- Home stadium: Shields–Watkins Field

1936 Southeastern Conference football standings
	Conf.					Overall
Team	W		L		T	W		L		T
No. 2 LSU $	6	–	0	–	0	9	–	1	–	1
No. 4 Alabama	5	–	0	–	1	8	–	0	–	1
Auburn	4	–	1	–	1	7	–	2	–	2
No. 17 Tennessee	3	–	1	–	2	6	–	2	–	2
Mississippi State	3	–	2	–	0	7	–	3	–	1
Georgia	3	–	3	–	0	5	–	4	–	1
Georgia Tech	3	–	3	–	1	5	–	5	–	1
Tulane	2	–	3	–	1	6	–	3	–	1
Vanderbilt	1	–	3	–	1	3	–	5	–	1
Kentucky	1	–	3	–	0	6	–	4	–	0
Florida	1	–	5	–	0	4	–	6	–	0
Ole Miss	0	–	3	–	1	5	–	5	–	2
Sewanee	0	–	5	–	0	0	–	6	–	1
$ – Conference champion

The 1936 Tennessee Volunteers (variously Tennessee, UT, or the Vols) represented the University of Tennessee in the 1936 college football season. Playing as a member of the Southeastern Conference (SEC), the team was led by head coach Robert Neyland, in his tenth year, and played their home games at Shields–Watkins Field in Knoxville, Tennessee. They finished the season with a record of six wins, two losses and two ties (6–2–2 overall, 3–1–2 in the SEC).

== Schedule ==
Date	Opponent	Rank	Site	Result	Attendance	Source
September 26	Chattanooga*		Shields–Watkins Field; Knoxville, TN	W 13–0	7,000	
October 3	at North Carolina*		Kenan Memorial Stadium; Chapel Hill, NC	L 6–14	15,000	
October 10	Auburn		Shields–Watkins Field; Knoxville, TN (rivalry)	L 0–6	15,000	
October 17	at Alabama		Legion Field; Birmingham, AL (rivalry)	T 0–0	15,000	
October 24	No. 2 Duke*^{†}		Shields–Watkins Field; Knoxville, TN	W 15–13	13,263	
October 31	at Georgia		Sanford Stadium; Athens, GA (rivalry)	W 46–0		
November 7	Maryville (TN)*		Shields–Watkins Field; Knoxville, TN	W 34–0	5,000	
November 14	at Vanderbilt		Dudley Field; Nashville, TN (rivalry)	W 26–13	20,000	
November 26	Kentucky	No. 17	Shields–Watkins Field; Knoxville, TN (rivalry)	W 7–6	20,000	
December 5	vs. Ole Miss	No. 17	Crump Stadium; Memphis, TN (rivalry)	T 0–0	17,000	
*Non-conference game; ^{†}Homecoming; Rankings from AP Poll released prior to the game

== Team players drafted into the NFL ==
Player	Position	Round	Pick	NFL club
Phil Dickens	Back	6	52	Chicago Cardinals
