= 1936 Auburn Tigers football team =

American college football season

1936 Auburn Tigers football

Bacardi Bowl, T 7–7 vs. Villanova
- Conference: Southeastern Conference
- Record: 7–2–2 (4–1–1 SEC)
- Head coach: Jack Meagher (3rd season)
- Captain: Walter Gilbert
- Home stadium: Drake Field; Legion Field; Cramton Bowl

1936 Southeastern Conference football standings
	Conf.					Overall
Team	W		L		T	W		L		T
No. 2 LSU $	6	–	0	–	0	9	–	1	–	1
No. 4 Alabama	5	–	0	–	1	8	–	0	–	1
Auburn	4	–	1	–	1	7	–	2	–	2
No. 17 Tennessee	3	–	1	–	2	6	–	2	–	2
Mississippi State	3	–	2	–	0	7	–	3	–	1
Georgia	3	–	3	–	0	5	–	4	–	1
Georgia Tech	3	–	3	–	1	5	–	5	–	1
Tulane	2	–	3	–	1	6	–	3	–	1
Vanderbilt	1	–	3	–	1	3	–	5	–	1
Kentucky	1	–	3	–	0	6	–	4	–	0
Florida	1	–	5	–	0	4	–	6	–	0
Ole Miss	0	–	3	–	1	5	–	5	–	2
Sewanee	0	–	5	–	0	0	–	6	–	1
$ – Conference champion

The 1936 Auburn Tigers football team represented Auburn University in the 1936 college football season. The Tigers' were led by head coach Jack Meagher in his third season and finished the season with a record of seven wins, two losses and two ties (7–2–2 overall, 4–1–1 in the SEC). Auburn also tied Villanova in the Bacardi Bowl, the first bowl game in the history of the Tigers' program. Walter Gilbert was the team captain.

== Schedule ==
Date	Opponent	Rank	Site	Result	Attendance	Source
September 25	Birmingham–Southern*		Cramton Bowl; Montgomery, AL	W 45–0	12,000	
October 3	at Tulane		Tulane Stadium; New Orleans, LA (rivalry)	T 0–0	18,000	
October 10	at Tennessee		Shields–Watkins Field; Knoxville, TN (rivalry)	W 6–0	15,000	
October 17	at Detroit*		University of Detroit Stadium; Detroit, MI	W 6–0	10,000	
October 24	vs. Georgia		Memorial Stadium; Columbus, GA (rivalry)	W 20–13		
October 31	at No. 19 Santa Clara*	No. 16	Kezar Stadium; San Francisco, CA	L 0–12	25,000	
November 7	at Georgia Tech	No. 20	Grant Field; Atlanta, GA (rivalry)	W 13–12	18,000	
November 14	No. 7 LSU		Legion Field; Birmingham, AL (rivalry)	L 6–19	24,000	
November 21	Loyola (LA)*^{†}		Drake Field; Auburn, AL	W 44–0	5,000	
November 28	Florida		Cramton Bowl; Montgomery, AL (rivalry)	W 13–0	6,000	
January 1, 1937	vs. Villanova*		La Tropical Stadium; Havana, Cuba (Bacardi Bowl)	T 7–7	6,000	
*Non-conference game; ^{†}Homecoming; Rankings from AP Poll released prior to the game
