= 1936 LSU Tigers football team =

American college football season

1936 LSU Tigers football

National champion (Sagarin) SEC champion

Sugar Bowl, L 14–21 vs. Santa Clara
- Conference: Southeastern Conference

Ranking
- AP: No. 2
- Record: 9–1–1 (6–0 SEC)
- Head coach: Bernie Moore (2nd season)
- Home stadium: Tiger Stadium

1936 Southeastern Conference football standings
	Conf.					Overall
Team	W		L		T	W		L		T
No. 2 LSU $	6	–	0	–	0	9	–	1	–	1
No. 4 Alabama	5	–	0	–	1	8	–	0	–	1
Auburn	4	–	1	–	1	7	–	2	–	2
No. 17 Tennessee	3	–	1	–	2	6	–	2	–	2
Mississippi State	3	–	2	–	0	7	–	3	–	1
Georgia	3	–	3	–	0	5	–	4	–	1
Georgia Tech	3	–	3	–	1	5	–	5	–	1
Tulane	2	–	3	–	1	6	–	3	–	1
Vanderbilt	1	–	3	–	1	3	–	5	–	1
Kentucky	1	–	3	–	0	6	–	4	–	0
Florida	1	–	5	–	0	4	–	6	–	0
Ole Miss	0	–	3	–	1	5	–	5	–	2
Sewanee	0	–	5	–	0	0	–	6	–	1
$ – Conference champion

The 1936 LSU Tigers football team was an American football team that represented Louisiana State University (LSU) as a member of the Southeastern Conference (SEC) during the 1936 college football season. In their second year under head coach Bernie Moore, the Tigers compiled an overall record of 9–1–1, with a conference record of 6–0, and finished as SEC champion. LSU won their second consecutive Southeastern Conference championship and earned their second straight trip to the Sugar Bowl in New Orleans. The defense allowed only 33 points the entire season, which still ranks fourth in school history for the fewest points allowed by a Tiger defense.

The team was rated No. 1 by the contemporary Houlgate System and presented with the Foreman & Clark national championship trophy.

== Schedule ==
Date	Opponent	Rank	Site	Result	Attendance	Source
September 26	Rice*		Tiger Stadium; Baton Rouge, LA	W 20–7	25,000	
October 3	at Texas*		War Memorial Stadium; Austin, TX	T 6–6	15,000	
October 10	Georgia		Tiger Stadium; Baton Rouge, LA	W 47–7	25,000	
October 17	Ole Miss		Tiger Stadium; Baton Rouge, LA (rivalry)	W 13–0		
October 24	vs. Arkansas*	No. 13	State Fair Stadium; Shreveport, LA (rivalry)	W 19–7	15,000	
October 31	at Vanderbilt	No. 8	Dudley Field; Nashville, TN	W 19–0	10,000	
November 7	Mississippi State^{†}	No. 7	Tiger Stadium; Baton Rouge, LA (rivalry)	W 12–0	25,000	
November 14	at Auburn	No. 7	Legion Field; Birmingham, AL (rivalry)	W 19–6	24,000	
November 21	Southwestern Louisiana*	No. 5	Tiger Stadium; Baton Rouge, LA	W 93–0	20,000	
November 28	No. 19 Tulane	No. 2	Tiger Stadium; Baton Rouge, LA (Battle for the Rag)	W 33–0		
January 1, 1937	No. 6 Santa Clara	No. 2	Tulane Stadium; New Orleans, LA (Sugar Bowl)	L 14–21	38,483	
*Non-conference game; ^{†}Homecoming; Rankings from AP Poll released prior to the game; Source:

== Game summaries ==
=== Auburn ===
The Tigers made their way to Birmingham's Legion Field to battle rival Auburn. One of the highlights of the game constituted LSU RB Cotton Milner's 90-yard touchdown run in the Tigers 19–7 victory over Auburn. The run ranks fourth on LSU's list of longest rushing touchdowns in school history.

=== Southwestern Louisiana ===
The Tigers' game at home against Southwestern Louisiana saw the Tigers score 52 points in a half, which ranks second in school history, and 93 points in a single game, which is the most points scored by LSU in a game.
