= Harry E. Clark =

American football player and coach (1894–1970)

Biographical details
- Born: 1894
- Died: December 21, 1970 (aged 76); Chattanooga, Tennessee, U.S.

Playing career
- 1914–1916: Sewanee
- 1919: Sewanee
- Positions: End, fullback, guard, quarterback, tackle

Coaching career (HC unless noted)
- 1922–1923: Sewanee (freshmen)
- 1925–1930: Sewanee (freshmen)
- 1931–1939: Sewanee

Head coaching record
- Overall: 21–56–3

Accomplishments and honors

Awards
- All-Southern (1916)

Harry Everenden "Hek" Clark (1894 – December 21, 1970) was an American college football player and coach. He served as the head football coach at his alma mater, Sewanee: The University of the South in Sewanee, Tennessee, from 1931 to 1939.

Clark played football at Sewanee from 1914 to 1916 and again 1919. He played at fullback, guard, and tackle in 1914, fullback in 1915, end and quarterback in 1916, and quarterback in 1919. Clark was the freshman football coach at Sewanee from 1922 to 1930, aside from 1924, when served in the United States Army.

Clark was later president of the Banks of Sewanee. He died on December 21, 1970, at a hospital in Chattanooga, Tennessee, at the age of 76.

== Head coaching record ==
Year	Team	Overall	Conference	Standing	Bowl/playoffs
Sewanee Tigers (Southern Conference) (1931–1932)
1931	Sewanee	6–3–1	3–3	T–8th	
1932	Sewanee	2–7–1	0–6	23rd	
Sewanee Tigers (Southeastern Conference) (1931–1932)
1933	Sewanee	3–6	0–6	13th	
1934	Sewanee	2–7	0–4	11th	
1935	Sewanee	2–7	0–6	13th	
1936	Sewanee	0–6–1	0–5	13th	
1937	Sewanee	2–7	0–6	13th	
1938	Sewanee	1–8	0–6	13th	
1939	Sewanee	3–5	0–3	13th	
Sewanee:		21–56–3	3–45		
Total:		21–56–3			
