= 1937 Orange Bowl =

American college football game

- 3rd Orange Bowl
| Duquesne Dukes | Mississippi State Maroons |
| (7–2) | (7–2–1) |
| Independent | SEC |
| 13 | 12 |
| Head coach: John "Clipper" Smith | Head coach: Ralph Sasse |
| AP 14 |
| | 1 | 2 | 3 | 4 | Total |
|---|---|---|---|---|---|
| Duquesne | 0 | 7 | 0 | 6 | 13 |
| Mississippi State | 6 | 6 | 0 | 0 | 12 |
- Date: January 1, 1937
- Season: 1936
- Stadium: Miami Field
- Location: Miami, Florida
- Referee: Tom Thorp
- Attendance: 9,210

United States TV coverage
- Network: CBS Radio
- Announcers: Ted Husing

The 1937 Orange Bowl was a college football postseason bowl game between the Mississippi State Maroons and Duquesne Dukes.

== Background ==
A 5th-place finish in the Southeastern Conference was an upturn from 9th for the Maroons, in their first official bowl game (not counting the 1912 Bacardi Bowl). This was technically Duquesne's first bowl game, as their previous "postseason" bowl game was the 1933 Festival of Palms Bowl, also held in Miami.

== Game summary ==
Ike Pickle scored first on a touchdown run to give the Maroons a 6-0 lead in the first quarter. Boyd Brumbaugh gave the Dukes a lead in the second quarter on his touchdown run, but Pee Wee Armstrong's pass to Fred Walters for a 40-yard touchdown made it 12-7 at halftime. Brumbaugh threw a 72-yard touchdown pass in the fourth quarter to Ernest Hefferle that proved to be the margin of victory as the Maroons' two missed extra points doomed the team.

== Aftermath ==
The Maroons returned to the Orange Bowl four years later. Duquesne has not played in a bowl game since.

== Statistics ==
| Statistics | Duquesne | Mississippi State |
|---|---|---|
| First downs | 14 | 12 |
| Rushing yards | 199 | 111 |
| Passing yards | 110 | 159 |
| Total yards | 309 | 270 |
| Interceptions | 4 | 0 |
| Punts–average | 9–24.7 | 6–43.0 |
| Fumbles | 0 | 0 |
| Penalties–yards | 1–5 | 1–5 |
