= Ralph Sasse =

American soldier, football player and coach (1889–1954)

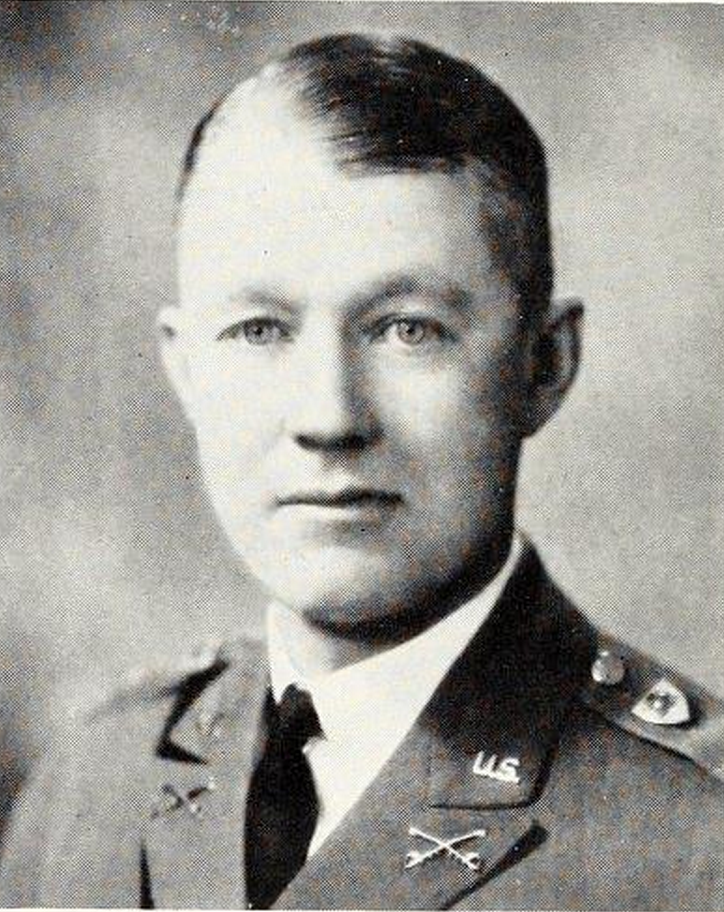
- Sasse pictured in Reveille 1936, Mississippi State yearbook

Biographical details
- Born: July 19, 1889; Wilmington, Delaware, U.S.
- Died: October 16, 1954 (aged 65); Rehoboth Beach, Delaware, U.S.

Playing career
- c. 1910: Army

Coaching career (HC unless noted)
- 1926–1929: Army (line)
- 1930–1932: Army
- 1935–1937: Mississippi State

Administrative career (AD unless noted)
- 1935–1936: Mississippi State

Head coaching record
- Overall: 45–15–4
- Bowls: 0–1

Ralph Irvine Sasse (July 19, 1889 – October 16, 1954) was an American college football player and coach, athletics administrator, and United States Army officer. He served as the head football coach at the United States Military Academy from 1930 to 1932 and at Mississippi State College, now Mississippi State University, from 1935 to 1937, compiling a career college football record of 45–15–4.

== Biography ==
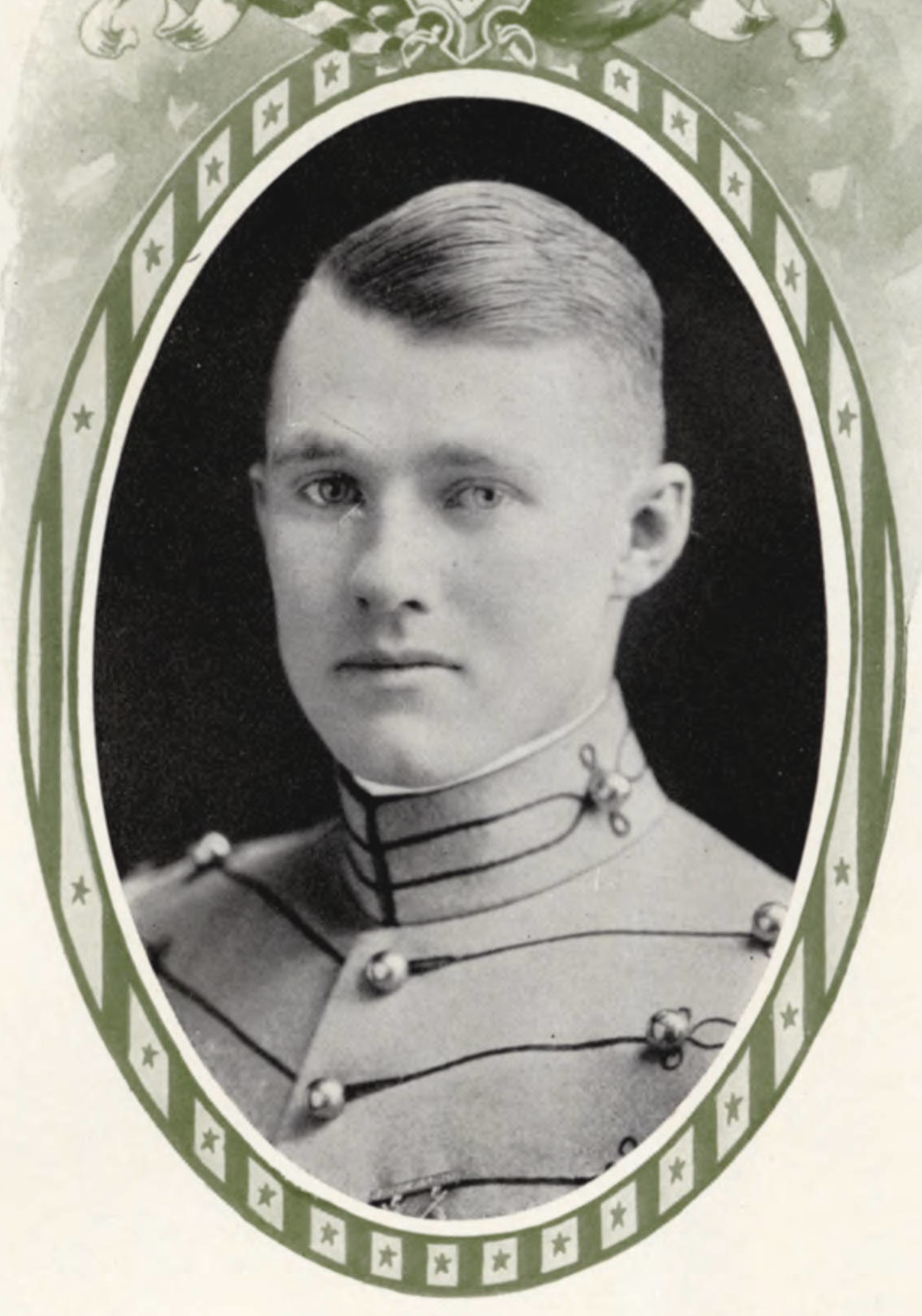
At West Point in 1916

Born near Wilmington, Delaware, in 1889, Sasse attended the United States Military Academy, graduating in 1916. After graduating from West Point, Sasse was assigned to the cavalry, and while serving the United States in World War I, he rose to the rank of Major and commanded the 301st Battalion. Tank Corps.

After World War I, he returned to his alma mater in 1924 as a mathematics instructor and was appointed head coach in 1929. Later, in 1935, Sasse joined the Mississippi State College staff as a science instructor and head football coach of the State College Maroons. After leading Mississippi State College to a 20–10–2 record in three years and an appearance in the 1937 Orange Bowl, Sasse stunned the students and players by resigning from his head coach's duties, following a doctor's orders after a sudden nervous breakdown. Upon leaving the coaching ranks, Sasse become the athletic director at Pennsylvania Military College, Chester in 1941.

Sasse died October 16, 1954, in Rehoboth Beach, Delaware. He was buried at Arlington National Cemetery.

He was inducted into the Delaware Sports Hall of Fame in 1981.

== Head coaching record ==
Year	Team	Overall	Conference	Standing	Bowl/playoffs
Army Cadets (Independent) (1930–1932)
1930	Army	9–1–1			
1931	Army	8–2–1			
1932	Army	8–2			
Army:		25–5–2			
Mississippi State Maroons (Southeastern Conference) (1935–1937)
1935	Mississippi State	8–3	2–3	T–9th	
1936	Mississippi State	7–3–1	3–2	5th	L Orange
1937	Mississippi State	5–4–1	3–2	5th	
Mississippi State:		20–10–2	8–7		
Total:		45–15–4			
