= 1937 Sugar Bowl =

American college football game

- 3rd Sugar Bowl
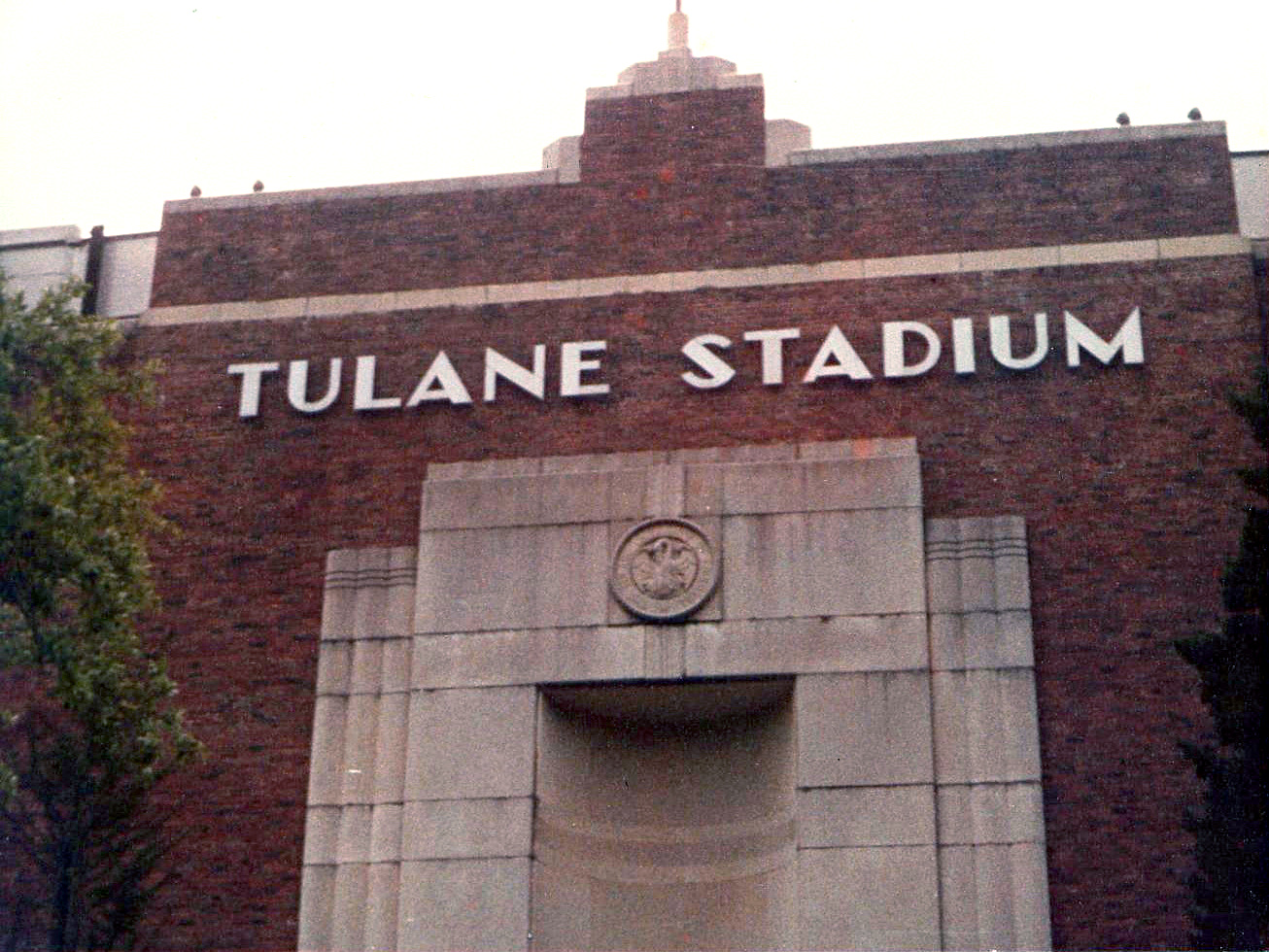
- Tulane Stadium in New Orleans, Louisiana, hosted the Sugar Bowl.
Santa Clara Broncos	LSU Tigers
(7–1)	(9–0–1)
Independent	SEC
21	14
Head coach: Buck Shaw	Head coach: Bernie Moore
AP 6	AP 2
	1	2	3	4	Total
Santa Clara	14	0	7	0	21
LSU	0	7	0	7	14
- Date: January 1, 1937
- Season: 1936
- Stadium: Tulane Stadium
- Location: New Orleans, Louisiana
- Favorite: LSU
- Referee: Alvin Bell (SWC; split crew: SWC, Pacific Coast, SEC)
- Attendance: 38,483

The 1937 Sugar Bowl was the third edition of the Sugar Bowl and matched the LSU Tigers and the Santa Clara Broncos. It was played on Friday, January 1, 1937, at Tulane Stadium in New Orleans, Louisiana.

== Background ==
LSU had allowed only 33 points during the regular season while cruising to a second straight Southeastern Conference championship with an undefeated regular season, with a non-conference tie at Texas early in the season. Santa Clara was an independent, which cost them an invite to the Rose Bowl due to not being a Pacific Coast Conference member; Washington won the PCC.

The Broncos were 7–0 when the Sugar invitation was made, but then were shut out 9–0 by Sammy Baugh and TCU on December 12 in San Francisco. LSU was spurned by the Rose Bowl committee as well, paving the way for Santa Clara's first bowl game and LSU's second straight Sugar Bowl.

In the final AP poll released in late November, LSU was second and Santa Clara was sixth.

== Game summary ==
Rain that had started the previous day continued throughout the game, which contributed to sixteen turnovers and 25 punts. LSU could not overcome a sloppy first quarter in which they had no first downs and allowed the Broncos to score twice. Manny Gomez caught a touchdown pass from Nello Falaschi and Norman Finley caught a touchdown pass from Bruno Pellegrini, both in a span of seven minutes. LSU narrowed the lead in the second quarter on Gus Tinsley's touchdown catch from Bill Crass, and Santa Clara led 14–7 at halftime.

Falaschi scored on a touchdown run in the third quarter to give the Broncos a 21–7 lead. Rocky Reed caught a touchdown pass late in the game to close the margin to 21–14, but the game was already sealed as neither team threatened again, affected by the wet weather. Notably, Shaw loaned shoes from nearby Loyola University to give his team an advantage on the wet field in the second half.

== Aftermath ==
LSU reached their third consecutive Sugar Bowl the following year, in a rematch with Santa Clara, and the Broncos won again in the rain.

== Statistics ==
Statistics	Santa Clara	LSU
First downs	10	7
Yards rushing	108	44
Yards passing	74	125
Total yards	182	169
Punts-Average	12–42.0	13–36.0
Fumbles lost	4	6
Interceptions	4	2
Penalty yards	42	0
