= Art White =

American football player (1915–1996)

No. 66, 35, 12
- Positions: End, guard

Personal information
- Born: December 6, 1915; Lockhart, Alabama, U.S.
- Died: January 23, 1996 (aged 80); Gaylesville, Alabama, U.S.
- Listed height: 5 ft 9 in (1.75 m)
- Listed weight: 217 lb (98 kg)

Career information
- High school: Atmore (Atmore, Alabama)
- College: Alabama
- NFL draft: 1937: 2nd round, 14th overall pick

Career history

Playing
- New York Giants (1937–1939); Chicago Cardinals (1940–1941); New York Giants (1945)

Coaching
- Chatham Field (1944) Head coach; First Air Force (1945) Ends coach

Awards and highlights
- NFL champion (1938); NFL All-Star Game (1938); First-team All-American (1936); First-team All-SEC (1936)

Career NFL statistics
- Games played: 50
- Games started: 19
- Stats at Pro Football Reference

Arthur Pershing "Tarzan" White (December 6, 1915 – January 23, 1996) was an American professional football end and guard who played professionally in the National Football League (NFL) for the New York Giants and Chicago Cardinals. He was also a professional wrestler.

White's football career began at Atmore High School in Atmore, Alabama, where he was named an all-state player in 1929. He played college football at the University of Alabama, where he was All-American in 1936. While at Alabama, he was a member of Phi Beta Kappa and earned both a bachelor's and a master's degree in mathematics.

White was selected by Giants in the second round of the 1937 NFL draft with the 14th overall pick. He was a Pro Bowl player in 1938. He played two seasons with the Chicago Cardinals from 1940 to 1941.

When the United States entered the Second World War, White joined the Army Air Corps. He continued to play football for the Army all-star team and attained the rank of lieutenant. After the war, he returned to civilian athletics as a professional wrestler. As a wrestler, he won multiple world heavyweight championships.

White was inducted into the Alabama Sports Hall of Fame in 1981.

== Head coaching record ==
Year	Team	Overall	Conference	Standing	Bowl/playoffs
Chatham Field Blockbusters (Independent) (1944)
1944	Chatham Field	2–8–1			
Chatham Field:		2–8–1			
Total:		2–8–1			

== See also ==
- List of gridiron football players who became professional wrestlers
