= 1937 Rose Bowl =

American college football game

- 23rd Rose Bowl Game
Pittsburgh Panthers	Washington Huskies
(7–1–1)	(7–1–1)
Independent	PCC
21	0
Head coach: Jock Sutherland	Head coach: James Phelan
AP 3	AP 5
	1	2	3	4	Total
Pittsburgh	7	0	7	7	21
Washington	0	0	0	0	0
- Date: January 1, 1937
- Season: 1936
- Stadium: Rose Bowl
- Location: Pasadena, California
- Player of the Game: Bill Daddio (E) – Pittsburgh
- Favorite: even
- Referee: Bob Morris
- Attendance: 87,196

The 1937 Rose Bowl, was the 23rd edition of the bowl game, between the independent Pittsburgh Panthers of western Pennsylvania and the Washington Huskies of Seattle, the champions of the Pacific Coast Conference. The game was played at the Rose Bowl in Pasadena, California, on Friday, January 1, 1937.

Ahead of the game, seating in the Rose Bowl was expanded to 87,677. This was Pittsburgh's fourth Rose Bowl in nine years, with losses in the 1928, 1930, and 1933 editions. Washington had previously tied in 1924 and lost in 1926.

In the final AP poll released in late November, Pittsburgh was third and Washington was fifth.

Pittsburgh led 7–0 at the half and scored two more touchdowns for a 21–0 shutout and their first Rose Bowl title.

== Scoring ==
=== First quarter ===
Pittsburgh – Frank Patrick, 1-yard run (Bill Daddio kick)

=== Third quarter ===
Pittsburgh – Frank Patrick, 3-yard run (Bill Daddio kick)

=== Fourth quarter ===
Pittsburgh – Bill Daddio, 71-yard interception (Bill Daddio kick)

== Game notes ==
- The game program was 25 cents.
