= Bacardi Bowl =

Former college football bowl game in Havana, Cuba

Bacardi Bowl (defunct)
- Rhumba Bowl
- Stadium: Almandares Park and La Tropical Stadium
- Location: Havana, Cuba
- Operated: 1907, 1910, 1912, 1921, 1937, 1946

The Bacardi Bowl was a college football bowl game played seven times in Havana, Cuba, at Almandares Park and La Tropical Stadium. The games were also referred to as the Rhumba Bowl and were the foremost event of Cuba’s annual National Sports Festival. The first five occurrences matched an American college team (all from the Deep South) against Cuban universities or athletic clubs. The 1937 game featured two American universities. The 1946 game—sometimes considered the first of the Cigar Bowl games—also matched an American college team (from the Deep South) against a Cuban university.

== Game results ==
Season	Date	Winner		Loser		Venue	Ref.
1907	December 25, 1907	LSU	56	University of Havana	0	Almandares Park • Havana, Cuba	
1909	January 1, 1910	Cuban Athletic Club	11	Tulane	0	Almandares Park • Havana, Cuba	
1911	January 1, 1912	Mississippi A&M	12	Cuban Athletic Club	0	Almandares Park • Havana, Cuba	
1912	December 25, 1912	Florida	28	Vedado Tennis Club	0	Almandares Park • Havana, Cuba	
1912	December 28, 1912	Florida vs. Cuban Athletic Club †				Almandares Park • Havana, Cuba	
1921	December 31, 1921	Cuban Athletic Club	13	Ole Miss	0	Almandares Park • Havana, Cuba	
1936	January 1, 1937	Auburn 7, Villanova 7				La Tropical Stadium • Havana, Cuba	
1946	December 7, 1946	Mississippi Southern	55	University of Havana	0	La Tropical Stadium • Havana, Cuba	

† game was not completed

=== Notable Bacardi Bowl games ===
==== 1907: LSU vs. University of Havana ====
The first Bacardi Bowl in 1907 matched Louisiana State University against the University of Havana.

==== 1912: Florida vs. Cuban Athletic Club ====
The 1912 Bacardi Bowl was scheduled as a two-game series in Havana featuring the Florida Gators against squads from two different Cuban athletic clubs. It was Florida's first experience with postseason football.

The first game was held on Christmas Day, and the Gators defeated the Vedado Athletic Club 28–0. The second game, which pitted the Gators against the Cuban Athletic Club of Havana a few days later, was never finished. Florida head coach George E. Pyle realized during the first quarter that the game was being officiated using college football's pre-1906 rules, and while discussing this issue with the officials, he discovered that the head referee was the former coach of his opponent. Feeling that playing under those conditions was neither fair nor safe, Pyle pulled his team off the field and was promptly arrested for violating a Cuban law prohibiting a game's suspension after spectators' money had been collected. A trial was scheduled and Pyle was released on bail that evening, at which point he and the Gators quickly boarded a steamship for Tampa, an escape which caused the coach to be branded a "fugitive from justice" by Cuban authorities.

Bacardi Bowl officials declared that Florida had forfeited the game and listed it as a 1–0 win for the Cuban Athletic Club, while the University of Florida declared the contest a 1–0 forfeit win for the Gators. In later years, both the complete and incomplete games were dropped from the university's official football record, and the Gators' trip to the Bacardi Bowl is not listed among the program's official bowl game appearances.

==== 1937: Auburn vs. Villanova ====
Auburn’s bowl history began with the 1937 game before 15,000 to 18,000 spectators when the Tigers and Villanova tied, 7–7. This game marked the first time that two American universities played a game on foreign soil. An Auburn drive in the first quarter stalled on the 10-yard line where the Wildcats took over on downs. After a Villanova punt, Auburn running back Billy Hitchcock broke loose around left end and rambled 40 yards for the Tigers' only score. The score at the half was Auburn 7, Villanova 0.

Auburn stopped a Villanova drive on its own 12-yard line during the third quarter but couldn’t get field position. Villanova was able to tie the score when they blocked an Auburn quick kick and the ball bounced into the endzone where Wildcat lineman Matthews Kuber fell on it for the score. The extra point tied the game. Auburn’s return to the US marked an end to more than 11,000 miles (18,000 km) of travel for the 7–2–2 Tigers that finished the season ranked 13th in the country under coach Jack Meagher.

The game was played in a revolutionary atmosphere. Fulgencio Batista, the dictator who would be overthrown by Fidel Castro 22 years later, had just assumed power. The game was almost canceled because Batista’s picture was not in the game program. A quick trip to the printer saved the Bacardi Bowl. The December 22, 1963, issue of the Florence Times-Tri-Cities Daily has a detailed account of former Auburn player Frank Hamm's recollections of this game.

== Other college football games against Cuban teams ==
Additional college football games were played in Cuba, or in the United States against Cuban teams, from 1906 to 1956.

Date Played	Winning Team		Losing Team		Location
November 24, 1906	U.S. Navy (USS Columbia)	15	University of Havana	0	Havana, Cuba
December 25, 1908	Rollins College	6	University of Havana	0	Havana, Cuba
December 25, 1915	Cuban Athletic Club	7	Southern College (Florida Southern College)	6	Havana, Cuba
January 1, 1916	Southern College (Florida Southern College)	47	Cuban Athletic Club	0	Tampa, Florida
January 1, 1920	Cuban Athletic Club	6	Stetson University	0	Havana, Cuba
January 1, 1923	Rollins College	80	University of Havana	0	Orlando, Florida
January 10, 1923	Cuban Athletic Club	13	American Legion (Tampa)	0	Havana, Cuba
December 23, 1923	Rollins College	59	Havana Police	0	Havana, Cuba
December 25, 1923	Rollins College	45	University of Havana	0	Havana, Cuba
December 30, 1923	Rollins College	31	Cuban Athletic Club	0	Havana, Cuba
November 29, 1924	Southern College (Florida Southern College)	32	University of Havana	7	Lakeland, Florida
December 6, 1924	Southern College (Florida Southern College)	0	University of Havana	0	Tampa, Florida
January 1, 1925	Tampa AC	13	University of Havana	6	Havana, Cuba
1926	U.S. Marines (Key West Leathernecks)	13	University of Havana	12	Key West, Florida
November 25, 1926	Miami (FL)	23	University of Havana	0	Coral Gables, Florida
December 24, 1926	Miami (FL)	23	University of Havana	0	Havana, Cuba
November 28, 1927	Howard College (Samford University)	20	University of Havana	6	Havana, Cuba
1928	University of Havana	6	Hollywood	0	unknown
1928	University of Havana	12	U.S. Marines (Key West Leathernecks)	0	unknown
October 27, 1928	Miami (FL)	62	Vedado Tennis Club	0	Coral Gables, Florida
November 29, 1929	University of Florida	9	University of Havana	0	St. Petersburg, Florida
December 6, 1929	Georgia Military Academy	31	Cuban Athletic Club	6	Atlanta, Georgia
December 15, 1934	University of Tampa	38	Cuban Athletic Club	13	Tampa, Florida
December 30, 1934	University of Tampa	25	Cuban Athletic Club	0	Havana, Cuba
November 11, 1938	Rollins College	7	University of Havana	6	Orlando, Florida
November 18, 1938	University of Tampa	33	University of Havana	0	Tampa, Florida
October 11, 1939	Georgia Teachers College (Georgia Southern University)	14	University of Havana	0	Statesboro, Georgia
October 27, 1939	Rollins College	25	University of Havana	0	Orlando, Florida
November 17, 1939	Rollins College	27	University of Havana	13	Havana, Cuba
December 9, 1939	Georgia Teachers College (Georgia Southern University)	27	University of Havana	7	Havana, Cuba
December 23, 1939	Rollins College	71	University of Havana	0	Havana, Cuba
December 30, 1939	University of Tampa	28	University of Havana	6	Havana, Cuba
November 21, 1944	Miami Naval Station Center (Tars)	30	University of Havana	13	Havana, Cuba
November 26, 1944	Chatham Field (Flyers)	25	University of Havana	7	Havana, Cuba
November 1944	U.S. Airforce (Flying Yanks)	7	University of Havana	7	Havana, Cuba
December 2, 1944	Presbyterian College	34	University of Havana	0	Spartanburg, South Carolina
December 1945	University of Havana	55	Fort Pierce Amphibious Station (Commandos)	20	Havana, Cuba
October 26, 1946	Norman Junior College (GA)	24	University of Havana	0	Norman Park, Georgia
November 9, 1946	Alabama "B" Team	53	University of Havana	18	Dothan, Alabama
December 7, 1946	Mississippi Southern College (University of Mississippi Southern)	55	University of Havana	0	Havana, Cuba
November 11, 1950	Jacksonville Naval Station (Fliers)	32	University of Havana	6	Havana, Cuba
November 30, 1956	Stetson University	64	University of Havana	0	Key West, Florida

Italics denote a tie game

== Other American football games in Cuba ==
The last organized American football game in Cuba was in 1958, when a semipro league featuring teams of Cubans and Americans played.

It would be another 45 years until Cuba would host a football game, this time featuring two American teams: in 2003, Bonita Vista High School and La Jolla High School from San Diego played at Pan-American Stadium. Due to the presence of metal boxes beyond the end lines, which was deemed a safety hazard, both coaches and the referee agreed to reduce the length of the field to 90 yards. In what was billed as the "Havana Classic", Bonita Vista defeated La Jolla, 31–22, in front of 400 people.

== See also ==
- List of college bowl games
- List of college football games played outside the United States
