= 1936 Mississippi State Maroons football team =

American college football season

1936 Mississippi State Maroons football

Orange Bowl, L 12–13 vs. Duquesne
- Conference: Southeastern Conference
- Record: 7–3–1 (3–2 SEC)
- Head coach: Ralph Sasse (2nd season)
- Home stadium: Scott Field

1936 Southeastern Conference football standings
	Conf.					Overall
Team	W		L		T	W		L		T
No. 2 LSU $	6	–	0	–	0	9	–	1	–	1
No. 4 Alabama	5	–	0	–	1	8	–	0	–	1
Auburn	4	–	1	–	1	7	–	2	–	2
No. 17 Tennessee	3	–	1	–	2	6	–	2	–	2
Mississippi State	3	–	2	–	0	7	–	3	–	1
Georgia	3	–	3	–	0	5	–	4	–	1
Georgia Tech	3	–	3	–	1	5	–	5	–	1
Tulane	2	–	3	–	1	6	–	3	–	1
Vanderbilt	1	–	3	–	1	3	–	5	–	1
Kentucky	1	–	3	–	0	6	–	4	–	0
Florida	1	–	5	–	0	4	–	6	–	0
Ole Miss	0	–	3	–	1	5	–	5	–	2
Sewanee	0	–	5	–	0	0	–	6	–	1
$ – Conference champion

The 1936 Mississippi State Maroons football team was an American football team that represented Mississippi State College (now known as Mississippi State University) as a member of the Southeastern Conference (SEC) during the 1936 college football season. Led by second-year coach Ralph Sasse, the Maroons finished 7–3–1 and played in the Orange Bowl.

== Schedule ==
Date	Opponent	Site	Result	Attendance	Source
September 26	Millsaps*	Scott Field; Starkville, MS	W 20–0	4,000	
October 3	Howard (AL)*	Scott Field; Starkville, MS	W 35–0		
October 10	at Alabama	Denny Stadium; Tuscaloosa, AL (rivalry)	L 0–7	17,000	
October 17	Loyola (LA)*	Ray Stadium; Meridian, MS	W 32–0		
October 24	at TCU*	Cotton Bowl; Dallas, TX	T 0–0	6,000	
October 31	Sewanee	Municipal Stadium; Jackson, MS	W 68–0	4,000	
November 7	at No. 7 LSU	Tiger Stadium; Baton Rouge, LA (rivalry)	L 0–12	25,000	
November 21	Ole Miss	Scott Field; Starkville, MS (Egg Bowl)	W 26–6	20,000	
November 28	Mercer*	Scott Field; Starkville, MS	W 32–0	3,500	
December 5	at Florida	Florida Field; Gainesville, FL	W 7–0	7,000	
January 1	vs. No. 12 Duquesne*	Miami Field; Miami, FL (Orange Bowl)	L 12–13	9,210	
*Non-conference game; Rankings from AP Poll released prior to the game
