= 1938 VPI Gobblers football team =

American college football season

1938 VPI Gobblers football
- Conference: Southern Conference
- Record: 3–5–2 (2–3–2 SoCon)
- Head coach: Henry Redd (7th season)
- Captain: Frank Marion Pierce
- Home stadium: Miles Stadium

1938 Southern Conference football standings
	Conf.					Overall
Team	W		L		T	W		L		T
No. 3 Duke $	5	–	0	–	0	9	–	1	–	0
Clemson	3	–	0	–	1	7	–	1	–	1
VMI	4	–	0	–	3	6	–	1	–	4
North Carolina	4	–	1	–	0	6	–	2	–	1
Richmond	3	–	2	–	1	6	–	3	–	1
Washington and Lee	2	–	2	–	0	4	–	4	–	1
NC State	3	–	3	–	1	3	–	7	–	1
South Carolina	2	–	2	–	0	6	–	4	–	1
Wake Forest	3	–	4	–	1	4	–	5	–	1
VPI	2	–	3	–	2	3	–	5	–	2
The Citadel	2	–	3	–	0	6	–	5	–	0
Maryland	1	–	2	–	0	2	–	7	–	0
Davidson	2	–	6	–	0	4	–	6	–	0
Furman	0	–	4	–	1	2	–	7	–	1
William & Mary	0	–	4	–	0	3	–	7	–	0
$ – Conference champion; Rankings from AP Poll

The 1938 VPI Gobblers football team represented Virginia Agricultural and Mechanical College and Polytechnic Institute in the 1938 college football season. The team was led by their head coach Henry Redd and finished with a record of three wins, five losses and two ties (3–5–2).

== Schedule ==
Date	Time	Opponent	Site	Result	Attendance	Source
September 17		Emory and Henry*	Miles Stadium; Blacksburg, VA	W 33–0		
September 24	8:00 p.m.	vs. Duke	World War Memorial Stadium; Greensboro, NC	L 0–18	13,000	
October 1		at Army*	Michie Stadium; West Point, NY	L 0–39		
October 8		vs. William & Mary	City Stadium; Richmond, VA	W 27–0	4,500	
October 15		Virginia*^{†}	Miles Stadium; Blacksburg, VA (rivalry)	L 6–14	7,000	
October 22	2:30 p.m.	at Washington and Lee	Wilson Field; Lexington, VA	L 0–6	9,000	
October 29		NC State	Miles Stadium; Blacksburg, VA	W 7–0	3,500	
November 5	2:00 p.m.	at North Carolina	Kenan Memorial Stadium; Chapel Hill, NC	L 0–7	18,000	
November 11		at Richmond	City Stadium; Richmond, VA	T 0–0	9,000	
November 24	2:15 p.m.	vs. VMI	Maher Field; Roanoke, VA (rivalry)	T 2–2	15,000-17,000	
*Non-conference game; ^{†}Homecoming

== Before the season ==
The 1937 VPI Gobblers football team compiled a 5–5 record and were led by Henry Redd in his sixth season as head coach.

== Game summaries ==
=== Emory and Henry ===
Emory and Henry at VPI

Team	1	2	3	4	Total
E&H	0	0	0	0	0
• VPI	20	0	6	7	33

- Date: September 17, 1938
- Location: Miles Stadium
  Blacksburg, VA
- Referee: Buck Cuddy (UVA)

VPI's first game of the season was a victory over Emory and Henry at Miles Stadium.

The starting lineup for VPI was: Pierce (left end), Pitts (left tackle), Worthington (left guard), Dunn (center), Devlin (right guard), Gaugler (right tackle), Cameron (right end), Fixx (quarterback), Miller (left halfback), Belcher (right halfback), Warriner (fullback). The substitutes were: Boswell, Buchanan, Coleman, DeMuro, Gosney, Graves, King, Markle, McMillan, Oliver, Powers, Rose, Shawhan, Smith, Taylor, Thomas, Traynham, Wood and Woolwine.

The starting lineup for Emory and Henry was: Frank Eaton (left end), Love (left tackle), Mullens (left guard), Louis Kovacs (center), G. Kovach (right guard), Brockman (right tackle), Bob Adams (right end), W. Gothard Bays (quarterback), Alfred Mann (left halfback), Johnson (right halfback), Tuffy Hymes (fullback). The substitutes were: Carl Brittain, Burchett, Hedrick, Less Holyfield, Mellons, Monger, Orr, Pierce, Jim Sessoms and Spraker.

=== Duke ===
Duke vs. VPI

Team	1	2	3	4	Total
• Duke	6	0	6	6	18
VPI	0	0	0	0	0

- Date: September 24, 1938
- Location: World War Memorial Stadium
  Greensboro, NC
- Game start: 8:00 p.m.
- Game attendance: 13,000
- Game weather: Balmy
- Referee: Arnold (Auburn)

After their victory over Emory and Henry, VPI played Duke University at World War Memorial Stadium in Greensboro, North Carolina.

The starting lineup for VPI was: Pierce (left end), Pitts (left tackle), Worthington (left guard), Wood (center), Devlin (right guard), Coleman (right tackle), Cameron (right end), Fixx (quarterback), DeMuro (left halfback), Belcher (right halfback), Warriner (fullback). The substitutes were: Oliver.

The starting lineup for Duke was: Bolo Perdue (left end), Tom Maloney (left tackle), Robert Baskerville (left guard), Dan Hill (center), Yorke (right guard), Robert Haas (right tackle), Bill Bailey (right end), Robert Spangler (quarterback), Jasper Davis (left halfback), Frank Killian (right halfback), Robert O'Mara (fullback). The substitutes were: Cecil Hennis, George McAfee, Wes McAfee, Anthony Ruffa and Eric Tipton.

=== Army ===
VPI at Army

Team	1	2	3	4	Total
VPI	0	0	0	0	0
• Army	26	0	7	6	39

- Date: October 1, 1938
- Location: Michie Stadium
  West Point, NY
- Referee: E. A. Geiges (Temple)

The starting lineup for VPI was: Cameron (left end), Pitts (left tackle), Worthington (left guard), Wood (center), Devlin (right guard), Gaugler (right tackle), Pierce (right end), DeMuro (quarterback), Belcher (left halfback), Miller (right halfback), Warriner (fullback). The substitutes were: Boswell, Buchanan, Coleman, Dunn, Ellison, Fixx, Gosney, Henderson, Hudson, King, Markle, Oliver, Powers, Shawhan, Traynham, Waugh and Woolwine.

The starting lineup for Army was: F. J. Yeager (left end), Harry Stella (left tackle), Melvin Engstrom (left guard), J. Maxwell (center), Robert Little (right guard), J. Lotozo (right tackle), Henry Sullivan (right end), Ken O. Due (quarterback), Woodrow Wilson (left halfback), W. H. H. Mullin (right halfback), W. P. Kelleher (fullback). The substitutes were: Benjamin Bailey, Coontz, John "Jack" Dobson, J. G. Dubuisson, William Gillis, Harris, C. S. Jobes, G. T. Larkin, W. M. Lauterbach, E. DeW. Light, Mansfield, Sidney Martin, James Mather, John McDavid, Maurice Miller, J. W. Milner, Muzyk, John Samuel, John Schrader and Thompson.

=== William & Mary ===
William & Mary vs. VPI

Team	1	2	3	4	Total
W&M	0	0	0	0	0
• VPI	7	0	14	6	27

- Date: October 8, 1938
- Location: City Stadium
  Richmond, VA
- Game attendance: 4,500
- Referee: Causey (South Carolina)

The starting lineup for VPI was: Pierce (left end), Pitts (left tackle), Worthington (left guard), Wood (center), Devlin (right guard), Coleman (right tackle), Cameron (right end), DeMuro (quarterback), Belcher (left halfback), Powers (right halfback), Ellison (fullback). The substitutes were: Boswell, Fixx and Miller.

The starting lineup for William & Mary was: Charles Gondak (left end), Walker (left tackle), Michael Hook (left guard), Herbert Krueger (center), John Davidson (right guard), John Dillard (right tackle), Stan Kamen (right end), William Seamans (quarterback), Lloyd Phillips (left halfback), Tommy Della Torre (right halfback), William Byrne (fullback). The substitutes were: Gordon Hanna.

=== Virginia ===
Virginia at VPI

Team	1	2	3	4	Total
• UVA	0	7	7	0	14
VPI	0	0	0	6	6

- Date: October 15, 1938
- Location: Miles Stadium
  Blacksburg, VA
- Game attendance: 7,000
- Game weather: "Indian summer weather"
- Referee: Dixon Foster

VPI's 1938 homecoming game was a loss to rival Virginia.

The starting lineup for VPI was: Pierce (left end), Pitts (left tackle), Worthington (left guard), Wood (center), Devlin (right guard), Coleman (right tackle), Henderson (right end), DeMuro (quarterback), Belcher (left halfback), Powers (right halfback), Ellison (fullback). The substitutes were: Boswell, Fixx, Gaugler, Gosney, Gray, King, Miller, Oliver and Shawhan.

The starting lineup for Virginia was: James Sargeant (left end), Lee McLaughlin (left tackle), Herbert Winokur (left guard), W. Oscar Willett (center), John Acree (right guard), Arthur Bryant (right tackle), Woodruff George (right end), James Beveridge (quarterback), Jim Gillette (left halfback), Mosby Cardozo (right halfback), Harry McClaugherty (fullback). The substitutes were: Dickey, Harry Dinwiddie, C. Tabb George, Nick Gianakos, Luther Gosney, Gravatt, L. Peyton Harris, Lewis, H. Cabell Maddux, Maines, Morse, Peter Nistad, Sylvester O'Grince, Rinehart, Phillip Rothar, Walter Smith and John Swank.

=== Washington and Lee ===
VPI at Washington & Lee

Team	1	2	3	4	Total
VPI	0	0	0	0	0
• W&L	0	0	6	0	6

- Date: October 22, 1938
- Location: Wilson Field
  Lexington, VA
- Game start: 2:30 p.m.
- Game attendance: 9,000
- Game weather: "Perfect"
- Referee: Henry Gerard (Illinois)

The starting lineup for VPI was: Pierce (left end), Pitts (left tackle), Worthington (left guard), Wood (center), Devlin (right guard), Coleman (right tackle), Henderson (right end), DeMuro (quarterback), Miller (left halfback), Belcher (right halfback), Ellison (fullback). The substitutes were: Gaugler, Gosney, King, Oliver, Powers and Thomas.

The starting lineup for Washington and Lee was: Taylor Simmons Truehart (left end), Richard Winfield "Dick" Boisseau (left tackle), William W. Brown (left guard), John Joseph "Jack" Mangan (center), James Edward Lindsey (right guard), Joseph H. Ochsie (right tackle), S. Bernard Harper (right end), Dan Ray Justice (quarterback), Ray Craft (left halfback), Courtney Young Wadlington (right halfback), Alfred Thomas "Junie" Bishop (fullback). The substitutes were: Robert Blanding, Howard Wesley Dobbins, Stephen Edward Hanasik, C. Harrison Hogan, W. Roy Hogan, William Keland, Kelley Litteral, Charles P. Lykes, R. Shack Parrish, Richard Pinck, Francis Joseph Sugrue, Ronnie Thompson, Walker and J. Dorsey Wilson.

=== NC State ===
NC State at VPI

Team	1	2	3	4	Total
NC State	0	0	0	0	0
• VPI	0	0	7	0	7

- Date: October 29, 1938
- Location: Miles Stadium
  Blacksburg, VA
- Game attendance: 3,500
- Referee: Dixon Foster

The starting lineup for VPI was: Pierce (left end), Pitts (left tackle), Worthington (left guard), Wood (center), Devlin (right guard), Coleman (right tackle), Henderson (right end), Fixx (quarterback), Thomas (left halfback), Belcher (right halfback), Hudson (fullback). The substitutes were: Boswell, Ellison, Gaugler, Gosney, Miller, Oliver, Powers and Warriner.

The starting lineup for NC State was: William Retter (left end), Ty Coon (left tackle), Steve Acai (left guard), Howell Stroup (center), Warren Wooden (right guard), George Fry (right tackle), Mickey Sullivan (right end), Arthur Rooney (quarterback), Andrew Pavlovsky (left halfback), Robert Sabolyk (right halfback), Kenneth Sands (fullback). The substitutes were: Ralph Burt, Tony DiYeso, Pat Fehley, Paul Lozier, William Matheney, Walt Novick, John Savini, J. Tatum, Thompson and Don Traylor.

=== North Carolina ===
North Carolina vs. VPI

Team	1	2	3	4	Total
VPI	0	0	0	0	0
• UNC	0	0	7	0	7

- Date: November 5, 1938
- Location: Kenan Memorial Stadium
  Chapel Hill, NC
- Game start: 2:00 p.m.
- Game attendance: 18,000
- Game weather: Rainy
- Referee: Richard Carrington (UVA)

The starting lineup for VPI was: Pierce (left end), Gosney (left tackle), Worthington (left guard), Wood (center), Devlin (right guard), Coleman (right tackle), Oliver (right end), Fixx (quarterback), Thomas (left halfback), Ellison (right halfback), Hudson (fullback). The substitutes were: Belcher, Gaugler, Graves, Henderson, King, Markle, Miller, Pitts, Powers, Rose, Warriner and Woolwine.

The starting lineup for North Carolina was: Horace Palmer (left end), Steve Maronic (left tackle), James Woodson (left guard), Robert Adam (center), Dan Desich (right guard), Claud Kimball (right tackle), James Mallory (right end), Snuffy Stirnweiss (quarterback), George Radman (left halfback), George Watson (right halfback), Jack Kraynick (fullback). The substitutes were: Don Baker, Mike Bobbitt, Julian Brantley, Tony Cernugle, Ellis Fields, Charles Kline, Jim Lalanne, Ed Megson, Walt Palanske, Pieffer, Sydney Sadoff, Paul Severin, Christian Siewers, Leo Slotnick, Smith and Winborne.

=== Richmond ===
VPI at Richmond

Team	1	2	3	4	Total
VPI	0	0	0	0	0
Richmond	0	0	0	0	0

- Date: November 11, 1938
- Location: City Stadium
  Richmond, VA
- Game attendance: 9,000
- Referee: Richard Carrington (UVA)

The starting lineup for VPI was: Henderson (left end), Pitts (left tackle), Worthington (left guard), Wood (center), Declin (right guard), Coleman (right tackle), Oliver (right end), Fixx (quarterback), Ellison (left halfback), Thomas (right halfback), Hudson (fullback). The substitutes were: Belcher, DeMuro, Gaugler, Graves, King, Pierce, Rose, Shawman, Traynham and Warriner.

The starting lineup for Richmond was: Bill Burge (left end), Andy Fronczek (left tackle), William Fitzhugh (left guard), Ed Merrick (center), Forrest Norvell (right guard), Harold McVay (right tackle), Avalon Marchant (right end), Bruce Van Buskirk (quarterback), Art Jones (left halfback), Stuart Hoskins (right halfback), George Spears (fullback). The substitutes were: William Cash, Edners Dickinson, Wilson Faris, Dick Humbert, John Kennedy, Wilfred Lawless, William Morrison and Edward Sinar.

=== VMI ===
VMI vs. VPI

Team	1	2	3	4	Total
VMI	2	0	0	0	2
VPI	2	0	0	0	2

- Date: November 24, 1938
- Location: Maher Field
  Roanoke, VA
- Game attendance: 15,000-17,000
- Game weather: Snowstorm
- Referee: Richard Carrington (UVA)

The starting lineup for VPI was: Pierce (left end), Pitts (left tackle), Worthington (left guard), Wood (center), Devlin (right guard), Coleman (right tackle), Oliver (right end), Fixx (quarterback), Ellison (left halfback), Rose (right halfback), Hudson (fullback). The substitutes were: Belcher, DeMuro, Gaugler, Gosney, Henderson, King and Thomas.

The starting lineup for VMI was: Ray Brittingham (left end), Rip Walker (left tackle), Ray Reutt (left guard), Richard Irby (center), Thomas Thrasher (right guard), Richard Strickler (right tackle), E. Ray Taylor (right end), James "Son" Shelby (quarterback), Vendel "Bud" Kovar (left halfback), Paul Shu (right halfback), Andy Trzeciak (fullback). The substitutes were: G. V. Atkinson, Brown, Carney, Phil Chapman, William "Red" Echols, Thomas Gray, Luther Huyett, Marshall, Langhorne Meem, Nelson, Luther Sexton and Tipton.

== After the season ==
In December 1938, the VPI players chose lineman Dave Pitts as captain of the 1939 VPI Gobblers football team.

== Players ==
=== Roster ===
VPI 1938 roster
Quarterback: Phil DeMuro; Guards: Bill Chisholm; Bill Devlin; Robert Preston Graves; Irving Gray; Ernie King; Joseph Franklin Smith; Buddy Waugh; George Worthington; Tackles: Robson Coiner; Jim Coleman; Jim Gaugler; Edward Gisburne; Woodrow Gosney; Dave Pitts; Frank Remorenko; Claude Simpson; Andrew Wellington Todd	Centers: Samuel Bascom Dunn; Herbert Andrews Markle; Neil Wood; Ends: Archie Cameron; John Henderson; Ernest Luke; Frank Oliver; Frank Pierce (Capt.); Sonny Powers; Bascom Pribble; Daniel Green Shawhan	Halfbacks: Bill Barnes; Graham Buchanan; Sonny Ellison; Jimmy Fixx; Rankin Hudson; Billy McMillan; Al Miller; Samuel B. Rose, Jr.; Garrett Taylor; Herbert Joseph Thomas; Albert Traynham; James Walter Woolwine; Fullbacks: Jim Belcher; Irving Ward Boswell; Sidney Gordon Campbell; George Warriner

=== Varsity letter winners ===
Twenty-one players received varsity letters for their participation on the 1938 VPI team.

Player	Hometown	Notes
James Raymond Belcher	Petersburg, Virginia	
Archibald Branks Cameron	Cranford, New Jersey	World War II veteran (Army). Awarded the Silver Star Medal and Purple Heart.
James Emory Coleman	Fayetteville, West Virginia	
Philip Galliano DeMuro	Passaic, New Jersey	
William Harper Devlin	Pittsburgh, Pennsylvania	
Matthew Leslie "Sonny" Ellison	Beckley, West Virginia	
James Stuart Fixx	Arlington, Virginia	
James Anthony Gaugler	Pittsburgh, Pennsylvania	
H. Woodrow Gosney	Clarksburg, West Virginia	
John L. Henderson	Sevierville, Tennessee	
Rankin McGuire Hudson	Sweetwater, Tennessee	
Ernest Stuart King	Disputanta, Virginia	
Albert Sanford Miller	Hampton, Virginia	
Frank Lovitt Oliver	Lynnhaven, Virginia	World War II veteran (Lieutenant Colonel, Army).
Frank Marion Pierce (Capt.)	Suffolk, Virginia	World War II veteran (Lieutenant Colonel, Army).
David Marion Pitts	Manassas, Virginia	
Stanley Covington "Sonny" Powers	Kingston, West Virginia	World War II veteran
Herbert Joseph Thomas	South Charleston, West Virginia	World War II veteran (Sergeant, Marines). Awarded the Medal of Honor.
George Daniel Warriner	Montgomery County, Virginia	World War II veteran (Captain, Army). Awarded the Bronze Star Medal and Purple Heart.
Neil Saunders Wood	Hampton, Virginia	
George Yellott Worthington	Washington, DC	

== Coaching and training staff ==
- Head coach: Henry Redd
- Assistant coaches
  - Backfield coach: Herbert McEver
  - Line coach: Sumner D. Tilson
- Manager: Marvin E. Inge, Jr.
- Freshman coaches
  - Freshman head coach: C. E. Tilson
  - Assistant freshman coach and trainer: Thomas A. Slusser
