= 1938 Duke Blue Devils football team =

American college football season

1938 Duke Blue Devils football

SoCon champion

Rose Bowl, L 3–7 vs. USC
- Conference: Southern Conference

Ranking
- AP: No. 3
- Record: 9–1 (5–0 SoCon)
- Head coach: Wallace Wade (8th season)
- Offensive scheme: Single-wing
- MVP: Eric Tipton
- Captains: Dan Hill; Eric Tipton
- Home stadium: Duke Stadium

1938 Southern Conference football standings
	Conf.					Overall
Team	W		L		T	W		L		T
No. 3 Duke $	5	–	0	–	0	9	–	1	–	0
Clemson	3	–	0	–	1	7	–	1	–	1
VMI	4	–	0	–	3	6	–	1	–	4
North Carolina	4	–	1	–	0	6	–	2	–	1
Richmond	3	–	2	–	1	6	–	3	–	1
Washington and Lee	2	–	2	–	0	4	–	4	–	1
NC State	3	–	3	–	1	3	–	7	–	1
South Carolina	2	–	2	–	0	6	–	4	–	1
Wake Forest	3	–	4	–	1	4	–	5	–	1
VPI	2	–	3	–	2	3	–	5	–	2
The Citadel	2	–	3	–	0	6	–	5	–	0
Maryland	1	–	2	–	0	2	–	7	–	0
Davidson	2	–	6	–	0	4	–	6	–	0
Furman	0	–	4	–	1	2	–	7	–	1
William & Mary	0	–	4	–	0	3	–	7	–	0
$ – Conference champion; Rankings from AP Poll

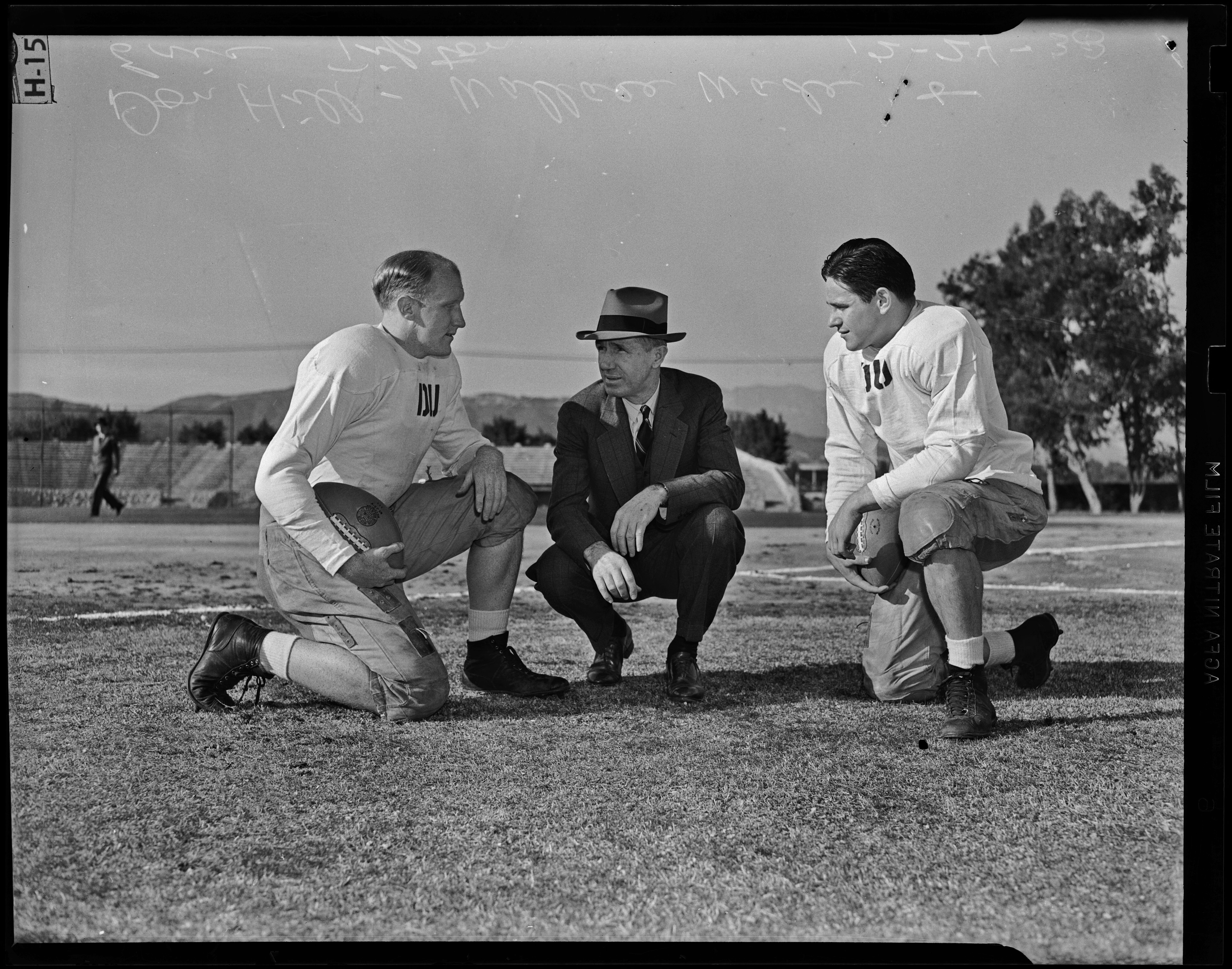
Captain Dan Hill, coach Wallace Wade, and captain Eric Tipton practicing in a Pasadena park ahead of the Rose Bowl

The 1938 Duke Blue Devils football team represented Duke University during the 1938 college football season. The Blue Devils were led by head coach Wallace Wade, who was in his eighth season at the school. Known as the "Iron Dukes", the 1938 Blue Devils went undefeated and unscored upon during the entire regular season, earning them the Southern Conference championship.

Duke was invited to the Rose Bowl against the USC Trojans. In what was the Blue Devils' first bowl game appearance, the contest was a scoreless defensive battle until early in the fourth quarter, when Duke kicked a field goal to take a 3–0 lead. However, USC threw a touchdown pass with one minute left to score the first and only points allowed by Duke during the season and win the game.

== Schedule ==
Date	Time	Opponent	Rank	Site	Result	Attendance	Source
September 24	8:00 p.m.	VPI		World War Memorial Stadium; Greensboro, NC	W 18–0	13,000	
October 1		Davidson		Duke Stadium; Durham, NC	W 27–0	6,000	
October 8		vs. Colgate*		Civic Stadium; Buffalo, NY	W 7–0	23,950	
October 15		Georgia Tech*^{†}		Duke Stadium; Durham, NC	W 6–0	28,000	
October 22		vs. Wake Forest	No. 9	Bowman Gray Stadium; Winston-Salem, NC (rivalry)	W 7–0	10,000	
October 29		at North Carolina	No. 11	Kenan Memorial Stadium; Chapel Hill, NC	W 14–0	35,000	
November 12		at Syracuse*	No. 7	Archbold Stadium; Syracuse, NY	W 21–0	27,500	
November 19		NC State	No. 4	Duke Stadium; Durham, NC (rivalry)	W 7–0	11,000	
November 26		No. 4 Pittsburgh*	No. 3	Duke Stadium; Durham, NC	W 7–0	49,138	
January 2		at No. 8 USC*	No. 3	Rose Bowl; Pasadena, CA (Rose Bowl)	L 3–7	93,000	
*Non-conference game; ^{†}Homecoming; Rankings from AP Poll released prior to the game
