= 1938 William & Mary Norfolk Division Braves football team =

American college football season

1938 William & Mary Norfolk Division Braves football
- Conference: Independent
- Record: 3–5–1
- Head coach: Tommy Scott (9th season)

1938 Southern college football independents records
	Conf.			Overall
Team	W	L	T	W		L		T
Georgetown		–		8	–	0	–	0
Hardin–Simmons		–		8	–	2	–	0
Roanoke		–		5	–	2	–	3
Western Maryland		–		5	–	2	–	1
Catholic University		–		5	–	3	–	0
George Washington		–		5	–	4	–	0
Navy		–		4	–	3	–	2
Virginia		–		4	–	4	–	1
West Virginia		–		4	–	5	–	1
Loyola (LA)		–		4	–	5	–	0
South Georgia Teachers		–		3	–	5	–	1
William & Mary Norfolk		–		3	–	5	–	1
Delaware		–		3	–	5	–	0
Delaware State		–		1	–	2	–	0
Oklahoma City		–		2	–	8	–	0
East Carolina		–		1	–	6	–	1

The 1938 William & Mary Norfolk Division Braves football team represented the Norfolk Division of the College of William & Mary, now referred to as Old Dominion University, during the 1938 college football season. They finished with a 3–5–1 record.

== Schedule ==
Date	Opponent	Site	Result	Source
	Wingate		W 7–0	
September 24	Norfolk NAS	Norfolk, VA	L 6–9	
September 30	at Richmond freshmen	Richmond, VA	L 2–6	
October 7	Hampden–Sydney freshmen	Norfolk, VA	W 22–6	
October 15	VMI freshmen	Norfolk, VA	L 0–14	
October 21	High Point	Norfolk, VA	L 0–7	
October 29	Georgetown freshmen	Norfolk, VA	L 0–6	
November 4	William & Mary freshmen	Norfolk, VA	T 6–6	
November 11	East Carolina	Norfolk, VA	W 6–0	
