= 1938 South Carolina Gamecocks football team =

American college football season

1938 South Carolina Gamecocks football
- Conference: Southern Conference
- Record: 6–4–1 (2–2 SoCon)
- Head coach: Rex Enright (1st season)
- Captains: W. R. Howell; Larry Craig
- Home stadium: Carolina Municipal Stadium

1938 Southern Conference football standings
	Conf.					Overall
Team	W		L		T	W		L		T
No. 3 Duke $	5	–	0	–	0	9	–	1	–	0
Clemson	3	–	0	–	1	7	–	1	–	1
VMI	4	–	0	–	3	6	–	1	–	4
North Carolina	4	–	1	–	0	6	–	2	–	1
Richmond	3	–	2	–	1	6	–	3	–	1
Washington and Lee	2	–	2	–	0	4	–	4	–	1
NC State	3	–	3	–	1	3	–	7	–	1
South Carolina	2	–	2	–	0	6	–	4	–	1
Wake Forest	3	–	4	–	1	4	–	5	–	1
VPI	2	–	3	–	2	3	–	5	–	2
The Citadel	2	–	3	–	0	6	–	5	–	0
Maryland	1	–	2	–	0	2	–	7	–	0
Davidson	2	–	6	–	0	4	–	6	–	0
Furman	0	–	4	–	1	2	–	7	–	1
William & Mary	0	–	4	–	0	3	–	7	–	0
$ – Conference champion; Rankings from AP Poll

The 1938 South Carolina Gamecocks football team was an American football team that represented the University of South Carolina as a member of the Southern Conference (SoCon) during the 1938 college football season. In their first season under head coach Rex Enright, the Gamecocks compiled an overall record of 6–4–1 with a mark of 2–2 in conference play, tying for sixth place in the SoCon.

== Schedule ==
Date	Opponent	Site	Result	Attendance	Source
September 19	Erskine*	Carolina Municipal Stadium; Columbia, SC	W 53–0	6,000	
September 24	at Xavier*	Xavier Stadium; Cincinnati, OH	W 6–0		
October 1	Georgia*	Carolina Municipal Stadium; Columbia, SC (rivalry)	L 6–7	13,000	
October 8	Wake Forest	Carolina Municipal Stadium; Columbia, SC	L 19–20	6,500	
October 14	vs. Davidson	Sumter County Fair Grounds; Sumter, SC	W 25–0		
October 20	Clemson	Carolina Municipal Stadium; Columbia, SC (rivalry)	L 12–34	22,500	
October 28	No. 15 Villanova*	County Fairgrounds; Orangeburg, SC	T 6–6		
November 5	Duquesne	Carolina Municipal Stadium; Columbia, SC	W 7–0	7,000	
November 12	at Furman	Sirrine Stadium; Greenville, SC	W 27–6	12,500	
November 19	at No. 18 Fordham*	Polo Grounds; New York, NY	L 0–13	15,000	
November 28	at Catholic University	Griffith Stadium; Washington, DC	W 7–0		
*Non-conference game; Rankings from AP Poll released prior to the game
