= 1938 All-Southern Conference football team =

The 1938 All-Southern Conference football team consists of American football players chosen by the Associated Press (AP) and United Press (UP) for the All-Southern Conference football team for the 1938 college football season.

== All-Southern Conference selections ==
=== Backs ===
- Eric Tipton, Duke (AP-1; UP-1)
- Bob O'Mara, Duke (AP-1; UP-1)
- Paul Shu, VMI (AP-1; UP-1)
- Snuffy Stirnweiss, North Carolina (AP-1)
- Don Willis, Clemson (AP-2; UP-1)
- Loyell Bryant, Clemson (AP-2)
- Art Rooney, NC State (AP-2)
- Marshall Edwards, Wake Forest (AP-2)

=== Ends ===
- Gus Goins, Clemson (AP-1; UP-1)
- Bolo Perdue, Duke (AP-1)
- Larry Craig, South Carolina (AP-2; UP-1)
- Chuck Kline, North Carolina (AP-2)

=== Tackles ===
- Ty Coon, North Carolina State (AP-1; UP-1)
- Steve Maronic, North Carolina (AP-1; UP-1)
- Curtis Pennington, Clemson (AP-2)
- Joe Ochsie, Washington & Lee (AP-2)

=== Guards ===
- Fred Yorke, Duke (AP-1; UP-1)
- Louis Trunzo, Wake Forest (AP-1; UP-1)
- Joe Payne, Clemson (AP-2)
- Red Echols, VMI (AP-2)

=== Centers ===
- Dan Hill Duke (AP-1; UP-1)
- Charlie Woods, Clemson (AP-2)

== Key ==
AP = Associated Press

UP = United Press

== See also ==
- 1938 College Football All-America Team
