= 1938 Wake Forest Demon Deacons football team =

American college football season

1938 Wake Forest Demon Deacons football
- Conference: Southern Conference
- Record: 4–5–1 (3–4–1 SoCon)
- Head coach: Peahead Walker (2nd season)
- Captain: George Wirtz
- Home stadium: Gore Field

1938 Southern Conference football standings
	Conf.					Overall
Team	W		L		T	W		L		T
No. 3 Duke $	5	–	0	–	0	9	–	1	–	0
Clemson	3	–	0	–	1	7	–	1	–	1
VMI	4	–	0	–	3	6	–	1	–	4
North Carolina	4	–	1	–	0	6	–	2	–	1
Richmond	3	–	2	–	1	6	–	3	–	1
Washington and Lee	2	–	2	–	0	4	–	4	–	1
NC State	3	–	3	–	1	3	–	7	–	1
South Carolina	2	–	2	–	0	6	–	4	–	1
Wake Forest	3	–	4	–	1	4	–	5	–	1
VPI	2	–	3	–	2	3	–	5	–	2
The Citadel	2	–	3	–	0	6	–	5	–	0
Maryland	1	–	2	–	0	2	–	7	–	0
Davidson	2	–	6	–	0	4	–	6	–	0
Furman	0	–	4	–	1	2	–	7	–	1
William & Mary	0	–	4	–	0	3	–	7	–	0
$ – Conference champion; Rankings from AP Poll

The 1938 Wake Forest Demon Deacons football team was an American football team that represented Wake Forest University during the 1938 college football season. In its second season under head coach Peahead Walker, the team compiled a 4–5–1 record and finished in ninth place in the Southern Conference.

Wake Forest guard Louis Trunzo was selected by the Associated Press as a first-team player on the 1938 All-Southern Conference football team.

== Schedule ==
Date	Opponent	Site	Result	Attendance	Source
September 17	Randolph–Macon*	Gore Field; Wake Forest, NC	W 57–6	5,000	
September 24	at North Carolina	Kenan Memorial Stadium; Chapel Hill, NC (rivalry)	L 6–14	14,000	
September 30	vs. The Citadel	American Legion Memorial Stadium; Charlotte, NC	W 31–0	5,000	
October 8	at South Carolina	Columbia Municipal Stadium; Columbia, SC	W 20–19	6,500	
October 15	at NC State	Riddick Stadium; Raleigh, NC (rivalry)	L 7–19	17,000	
October 22	vs. No. 9 Duke	Bowman Gray Stadium; Winston-Salem, NC (rivalry)	L 0–7	10,000	
October 28	Clemson	Gore Field; Wake Forest, NC	L 0–7	7,500	
November 5	at VMI	Alumni Field; Lexington, VA	T 6–6	4,000	
November 12	vs. Western Maryland*	Municipal Stadium; Baltimore, MD	L 13–20		
November 24	vs. Davidson	American Legion Memorial Stadium; Charlotte, NC	W 21–0	7,000	
*Non-conference game; Rankings from AP Poll released prior to the game
