= 1938 Washington and Lee Generals football team =

American college football season

1938 Washington and Lee Generals football
- Conference: Southern Conference
- Record: 4–4–1 (2–2 SoCon)
- Head coach: Warren E. Tilson (6th season)
- Home stadium: Wilson Field

1938 Southern Conference football standings
	Conf.					Overall
Team	W		L		T	W		L		T
No. 3 Duke $	5	–	0	–	0	9	–	1	–	0
Clemson	3	–	0	–	1	7	–	1	–	1
VMI	4	–	0	–	3	6	–	1	–	4
North Carolina	4	–	1	–	0	6	–	2	–	1
Richmond	3	–	2	–	1	6	–	3	–	1
Washington and Lee	2	–	2	–	0	4	–	4	–	1
NC State	3	–	3	–	1	3	–	7	–	1
South Carolina	2	–	2	–	0	6	–	4	–	1
Wake Forest	3	–	4	–	1	4	–	5	–	1
VPI	2	–	3	–	2	3	–	5	–	2
The Citadel	2	–	3	–	0	6	–	5	–	0
Maryland	1	–	2	–	0	2	–	7	–	0
Davidson	2	–	6	–	0	4	–	6	–	0
Furman	0	–	4	–	1	2	–	7	–	1
William & Mary	0	–	4	–	0	3	–	7	–	0
$ – Conference champion; Rankings from AP Poll

The 1938 Washington and Lee Generals football team was an American football team that represented Washington and Lee University during the 1938 college football season as a member of the Southern Conference. In their sixth year under head coach Warren E. Tilson, the team compiled an overall record of 4–4–1, with a mark of 2–2 in conference play.

== Schedule ==
Date	Opponent	Site	Result	Attendance	Source
September 23	Hampden–Sydney*	Wilson Field; Lexington, VA	W 7–6	2,500	
October 1	at Virginia*	Scott Stadium; Charlottesville, VA	L 0–13	9,000	
October 8	vs. West Virginia*	Laidley Field; Charleston, WV	T 6–6	8,000	
October 15	at Kentucky*	Stoll Field; Lexington, KY	W 8–0	10,000	
October 22	VPI	Wilson Field; Lexington, VA	W 6–0	8,000	
October 29	at Richmond	City Stadium; Richmond, VA	L 0–6	4,000	
November 5	at Centre*	duPont Manual Stadium; Louisville, KY	L 0–7	7,500	
November 12	William & Mary	Wilson Field; Lexington, VA	W 27–0		
November 24	at Maryland	Municipal Stadium; Baltimore, MD	L 13–19		
*Non-conference game
