= 1938 Richmond Spiders football team =

American college football season

1938 Richmond Spiders football
- Conference: Southern Conference
- Record: 6–3–1 (3–2–1 SoCon)
- Head coach: Glenn Thistlethwaite (5th season)
- Captain: Avalon B. Marchant
- Home stadium: City Stadium

1938 Southern Conference football standings
	Conf.					Overall
Team	W		L		T	W		L		T
No. 3 Duke $	5	–	0	–	0	9	–	1	–	0
Clemson	3	–	0	–	1	7	–	1	–	1
VMI	4	–	0	–	3	6	–	1	–	4
North Carolina	4	–	1	–	0	6	–	2	–	1
Richmond	3	–	2	–	1	6	–	3	–	1
Washington and Lee	2	–	2	–	0	4	–	4	–	1
NC State	3	–	3	–	1	3	–	7	–	1
South Carolina	2	–	2	–	0	6	–	4	–	1
Wake Forest	3	–	4	–	1	4	–	5	–	1
VPI	2	–	3	–	2	3	–	5	–	2
The Citadel	2	–	3	–	0	6	–	5	–	0
Maryland	1	–	2	–	0	2	–	7	–	0
Davidson	2	–	6	–	0	4	–	6	–	0
Furman	0	–	4	–	1	2	–	7	–	1
William & Mary	0	–	4	–	0	3	–	7	–	0
$ – Conference champion; Rankings from AP Poll

The 1938 Richmond Spiders football team was an American football team that represented the University of Richmond as a member of the Southern Conference (SoCon) during the 1938 college football season. In their fifth season under head coach Glenn Thistlethwaite, Richmond compiled a 6–3–1 record, with a mark of 3–2–1 in conference play, finishing in fifth place in the SoCon.

== Schedule ==
Date	Opponent	Site	Result	Attendance	Source
September 16	at Apprentice*	Newport News, VA	W 6–0	3,500	
September 24	at Maryland	Byrd Stadium; College Park, MD	W 19–6	6,000	
October 1	Randolph–Macon*	City Stadium; Richmond, VA	W 12–7	5,000	
October 8	at Hampden–Sydney*	Hampden Sydney, VA	W 26–7	3,500	
October 15	VMI	City Stadium; Richmond, VA (rivalry)	L 6–13	12,000	
October 22	Roanoke*	City Stadium; Richmond, VA	L 6–13		
October 29	Washington and Lee	City Stadium; Richmond, VA	W 6–0	4,000	
November 5	at The Citadel	Johnson Hagood Stadium; Charleston, SC	L 0–6	5,000	
November 11	VPI	City Stadium; Richmond, VA	T 0–0	9,000	
November 24	William & Mary	City Stadium; Richmond, VA (rivalry)	W 10–7	5,500	
*Non-conference game
