= 1938 East Carolina Pirates football team =

American college football season

1938 East Carolina Pirates football
- Conference: Independent
- Record: 1–6–1
- Head coach: J. D. Alexander (2nd season)

1938 Southern college football independents records
	Conf.			Overall
Team	W	L	T	W		L		T
Georgetown		–		8	–	0	–	0
Hardin–Simmons		–		8	–	2	–	0
Roanoke		–		5	–	2	–	3
Western Maryland		–		5	–	2	–	1
Catholic University		–		5	–	3	–	0
George Washington		–		5	–	4	–	0
Navy		–		4	–	3	–	2
Virginia		–		4	–	4	–	1
West Virginia		–		4	–	5	–	1
Loyola (LA)		–		4	–	5	–	0
South Georgia Teachers		–		3	–	5	–	1
William & Mary Norfolk		–		3	–	5	–	1
Delaware		–		3	–	5	–	0
Delaware State		–		1	–	2	–	0
Oklahoma City		–		2	–	8	–	0
East Carolina		–		1	–	6	–	1

The 1938 East Carolina Pirates football team was an American football team that represented East Carolina Teachers College (now known as East Carolina University) as an independent during the 1938 college football season. In their second season under head coach J. D. Alexander, the team compiled a 1–6–1 record.

== Schedule ==
Date	Opponent	Site	Result	Source
October 1	Belmont Abbey	Greenville, NC	L 0–19	
October 8	Campbell	Greenville, NC	L 6–19	
October 22	at Western Carolina	Cullowhee, NC	W 7–6	
October 28	at High Point	High Point, NC	L 7–20	
November 5	at Guilford	Greensboro, NC	T 7–7	
November 11	at William & Mary Norfolk Division	Norfolk, VA	L 0–6	
November 19	Appalachian State	Greenville, NC	L 6–18	
November 26	Naval Station Norfolk	Greenville, NC	L 7–32	
