= 1938 Navy Midshipmen football team =

American college football season

1938 Navy Midshipmen football
- Conference: Independent
- Record: 4–3–2
- Head coach: Hank Hardwick (2nd season)
- Captain: Lucien Powell
- Home stadium: Thompson Stadium

1938 Southern college football independents records
	Conf.			Overall
Team	W	L	T	W		L		T
Georgetown		–		8	–	0	–	0
Hardin–Simmons		–		8	–	2	–	0
Roanoke		–		5	–	2	–	3
Western Maryland		–		5	–	2	–	1
Catholic University		–		5	–	3	–	0
George Washington		–		5	–	4	–	0
Navy		–		4	–	3	–	2
Virginia		–		4	–	4	–	1
West Virginia		–		4	–	5	–	1
Loyola (LA)		–		4	–	5	–	0
South Georgia Teachers		–		3	–	5	–	1
William & Mary Norfolk		–		3	–	5	–	1
Delaware		–		3	–	5	–	0
Delaware State		–		1	–	2	–	0
Oklahoma City		–		2	–	8	–	0
East Carolina		–		1	–	6	–	1

The 1938 Navy Midshipmen football team represented the United States Naval Academy during the 1938 college football season. In their second season under head coach Hank Hardwick, the Midshipmen compiled a 4–3–2 record and outscored their opponents by a combined score of 126 to 60.

== Schedule ==
Date	Opponent	Site	Result	Attendance	Source
September 24	William & Mary	Thompson Stadium; Annapolis, MD	W 26–0	16,000	
October 1	VMI	Thompson Stadium; Annapolis, MD	W 26–0	20,000	
October 8	Virginia	Thompson Stadium; Annapolis, MD	W 33–0	22,251	
October 15	at Yale	Yale Bowl; New Haven, CT	L 7–9		
October 22	Princeton	Municipal Stadium; Baltimore, MD	T 13–13		
October 29	at Penn	Franklin Field; Philadelphia, PA	T 0–0		
November 5	No. 4 Notre Dame	Municipal Stadium; Baltimore, MD (rivalry)	L 0–15	58,271	
November 12	at Columbia	Baker Field; New York, NY	W 14–9	33,000	
November 26	vs. Army	Philadelphia Municipal Stadium; Philadelphia, PA (Army–Navy Game)	L 7–14		
Rankings from AP Poll released prior to the game
