= 1938 Delaware State Hornets football team =

American college football season

1938 Delaware State Hornets football
- Conference: Independent
- Record: 1–2
- Head coach: Turner (1st season)
- Home stadium: Soldier's Field

1938 Southern college football independents records
	Conf.			Overall
Team	W	L	T	W		L		T
Georgetown		–		8	–	0	–	0
Hardin–Simmons		–		8	–	2	–	0
Roanoke		–		5	–	2	–	3
Western Maryland		–		5	–	2	–	1
Catholic University		–		5	–	3	–	0
George Washington		–		5	–	4	–	0
Navy		–		4	–	3	–	2
Virginia		–		4	–	4	–	1
West Virginia		–		4	–	5	–	1
Loyola (LA)		–		4	–	5	–	0
South Georgia Teachers		–		3	–	5	–	1
William & Mary Norfolk		–		3	–	5	–	1
Delaware		–		3	–	5	–	0
Delaware State		–		1	–	2	–	0
Oklahoma City		–		2	–	8	–	0
East Carolina		–		1	–	6	–	1

The 1938 Delaware State Hornets football team represented the State College for Colored Students—now known as Delaware State University—in the 1938 college football season as an independent.

== Schedule ==
Date	Opponent	Site	Result	Source
October 15	Princess Anne		W 9–0	
October 21	Bordentown	Soldier's Field; Dover, DE	L 12–19	
October 29	at Storer	Harper's Ferry, VA	?	
November 12	Cheyney	Soldier's Field; Dover, DE	L 7–20	
