= 1938 Virginia Cavaliers football team =

American college football season

1938 Virginia Cavaliers football
- Conference: Independent
- Record: 4–4–1
- Head coach: Frank Murray (2nd season)
- Captain: John Acree
- Home stadium: Scott Stadium

1938 Southern college football independents records
	Conf.			Overall
Team	W	L	T	W		L		T
Georgetown		–		8	–	0	–	0
Hardin–Simmons		–		8	–	2	–	0
Roanoke		–		5	–	2	–	3
Western Maryland		–		5	–	2	–	1
Catholic University		–		5	–	3	–	0
George Washington		–		5	–	4	–	0
Navy		–		4	–	3	–	2
Virginia		–		4	–	4	–	1
West Virginia		–		4	–	5	–	1
Loyola (LA)		–		4	–	5	–	0
South Georgia Teachers		–		3	–	5	–	1
William & Mary Norfolk		–		3	–	5	–	1
Delaware		–		3	–	5	–	0
Delaware State		–		1	–	2	–	0
Oklahoma City		–		2	–	8	–	0
East Carolina		–		1	–	6	–	1

The 1938 Virginia Cavaliers football team represented the University of Virginia during the 1938 college football season. The Cavaliers were led by second-year head coach Frank Murray and played their home games at Scott Stadium in Charlottesville, Virginia. They competed as independents, finishing with a record of 4–4–1.

== Schedule ==
Date	Opponent	Site	Result	Attendance	Source
September 24	VMI	Scott Stadium; Charlottesville, VA	T 12–12	12,000	
October 1	Washington and Lee^{†}	Scott Stadium; Charlottesville, VA	W 13–0	9,000	
October 8	at Navy	Thompson Stadium; Annapolis, MD	L 0–33	22,251	
October 15	at VPI	Miles Stadium; Blacksburg, VA (rivalry)	W 14–6	7,000	
October 22	at Maryland	Byrd Stadium; College Park, MD (rivalry)	W 27–19	5,000	
October 29	William & Mary	Scott Stadium; Charlottesville, VA	W 34–0	7,000	
November 5	at Columbia	Baker Field; New York, NY	L 0–39	15,000	
November 12	at Harvard	Harvard Stadium; Boston, MA	L 13–40	15,000	
November 24	North Carolina	Scott Stadium; Charlottesville, VA (South's Oldest Rivalry)	L 0–20	7,500	
^{†}Homecoming
