= 1938 Roanoke Maroons football team =

American college football season

1938 Roanoke Maroons football
- Conference: Independent
- Record: 5–2–3
- Head coach: Gordon C. White (9th season)
- Home stadium: College Field

1938 Southern college football independents records
	Conf.			Overall
Team	W	L	T	W		L		T
Georgetown		–		8	–	0	–	0
Hardin–Simmons		–		8	–	2	–	0
Roanoke		–		5	–	2	–	3
Western Maryland		–		5	–	2	–	1
Catholic University		–		5	–	3	–	0
George Washington		–		5	–	4	–	0
Navy		–		4	–	3	–	2
Virginia		–		4	–	4	–	1
West Virginia		–		4	–	5	–	1
Loyola (LA)		–		4	–	5	–	0
South Georgia Teachers		–		3	–	5	–	1
William & Mary Norfolk		–		3	–	5	–	1
Delaware		–		3	–	5	–	0
Delaware State		–		1	–	2	–	0
Oklahoma City		–		2	–	8	–	0
East Carolina		–		1	–	6	–	1

The 1938 Roanoke Maroons football team represented Roanoke College as an independent during the 1938 college football season. Led by ninth-year head coach Gordon C. White, the Maroons compiled an overall record of 5–2–3.

== Schedule ==
Date	Opponent	Site	Result	Attendance	Source
September 17	Newberry	College Field; Salem, VA	W 13–7		
September 24	Lenoir–Rhyne	College Field; Salem, VA	T 12–12		
October 1	Catawba	College Field; Salem, VA	T 6–6		
October 8	at Georgetown	Griffith Stadium; Washington, DC	L 6–33	5,000	
October 14	Concord State	College Field; Salem, VA	W 26–7		
October 22	at Richmond	City Stadium; Richmond, VA	W 13–6		
October 29	Randolph–Macon	College Field; Salem, VA	W 28–0	3,500	
November 11	at Apprentice	Saunders Stadium; Newport News, VA	W 13–0	5,000	
November 19	at VMI	Alumni Field; Lexington, VA	L 0–6	3,000	
November 24	at King	Bristol Municipal Stadium; Bristol, TN	T 0–0		
