= 1938 West Virginia Mountaineers football team =

American college football season

1938 West Virginia Mountaineers football
- Conference: Independent
- Record: 4–5–1
- Head coach: Marshall Glenn (2nd season)
- Captains: Alex Atty; Sam Audia
- Home stadium: Mountaineer Field

1938 Southern college football independents records
	Conf.			Overall
Team	W	L	T	W		L		T
Georgetown		–		8	–	0	–	0
Hardin–Simmons		–		8	–	2	–	0
Roanoke		–		5	–	2	–	3
Western Maryland		–		5	–	2	–	1
Catholic University		–		5	–	3	–	0
George Washington		–		5	–	4	–	0
Navy		–		4	–	3	–	2
Virginia		–		4	–	4	–	1
West Virginia		–		4	–	5	–	1
Loyola (LA)		–		4	–	5	–	0
South Georgia Teachers		–		3	–	5	–	1
William & Mary Norfolk		–		3	–	5	–	1
Delaware		–		3	–	5	–	0
Delaware State		–		1	–	2	–	0
Oklahoma City		–		2	–	8	–	0
East Carolina		–		1	–	6	–	1

The 1938 West Virginia Mountaineers football team was an American football team that represented West Virginia University as an independent during the 1938 college football season. In its second season under head coach Marshall Glenn, the team compiled a 4–5–1 record and was outscored by a total of 117 to 98. The team played its home games at Mountaineer Field in Morgantown, West Virginia. Alex Atty and Sam Audia were the team captains.

== Schedule ==
Date	Opponent	Site	Result	Attendance	Source
September 24	at Pittsburgh	Pitt Stadium; Pittsburgh, PA (rivalry)	L 0–19	34,500	
October 1	West Virginia Wesleyan	Mountaineer Field; Morgantown, WV	W 38–6	5,000	
October 8	vs. Washington and Lee	Laidley Field; Charleston, WV	T 6–6	8,000	
October 15	Michigan State	Mountaineer Field; Morgantown, WV	L 0–26	9,000	
October 22	at Creighton	Creighton Stadium; Omaha, NE	W 20–13	11,000	
October 29	Youngstown	Mountaineer Field; Morgantown, WV	W 27–7		
November 5	at Western Reserve	League Park; Cleveland, OH	L 0–7	15,000	
November 12	Georgetown^{†}	Mountaineer Field; Morgantown, WV	L 0–14	14,000	
November 19	at Manhattan	Yankee Stadium; Bronx, NY	L 0–13	6,000	
November 24	at George Washington	Griffith Stadium; Washington, D.C.	W 7–6		
^{†}Homecoming
