= 1938 Furman Purple Hurricane football team =

American college football season

1938 Furman Purple Hurricane football
- Conference: Southern Conference
- Record: 2–7–1 (0–4–1 SoCon)
- Head coach: Dizzy McLeod (7th season)
- Captain: George Patrick
- Home stadium: Sirrine Stadium

1938 Southern Conference football standings
| | Conf. | | | | | Overall |
| Team | W | | L | | T | W | | L | | T |
|---|---|---|---|---|---|---|---|---|---|---|
| No. 3 Duke $ | 5 | – | 0 | – | 0 | 9 | – | 1 | – | 0 |
| Clemson | 3 | – | 0 | – | 1 | 7 | – | 1 | – | 1 |
| VMI | 4 | – | 0 | – | 3 | 6 | – | 1 | – | 4 |
| North Carolina | 4 | – | 1 | – | 0 | 6 | – | 2 | – | 1 |
| Richmond | 3 | – | 2 | – | 1 | 6 | – | 3 | – | 1 |
| Washington and Lee | 2 | – | 2 | – | 0 | 4 | – | 4 | – | 1 |
| NC State | 3 | – | 3 | – | 1 | 3 | – | 7 | – | 1 |
| South Carolina | 2 | – | 2 | – | 0 | 6 | – | 4 | – | 1 |
| Wake Forest | 3 | – | 4 | – | 1 | 4 | – | 5 | – | 1 |
| VPI | 2 | – | 3 | – | 2 | 3 | – | 5 | – | 2 |
| The Citadel | 2 | – | 3 | – | 0 | 6 | – | 5 | – | 0 |
| Maryland | 1 | – | 2 | – | 0 | 2 | – | 7 | – | 0 |
| Davidson | 2 | – | 6 | – | 0 | 4 | – | 6 | – | 0 |
| Furman | 0 | – | 4 | – | 1 | 2 | – | 7 | – | 1 |
| William & Mary | 0 | – | 4 | – | 0 | 3 | – | 7 | – | 0 |
$ – Conference champion; Rankings from AP Poll

The 1938 Furman Purple Hurricane football team was an American football team that represented Furman University as a member of the Southern Conference (SoCon) during the 1938 college football season. In their seventh year under head coach Dizzy McLeod, the Purple Hurricane compiled an overall record of 2–7–1 with a conference mark of 0–4–1, and finished 14th in the SoCon.

== Schedule ==
| Date | Opponent | Site | Result | Attendance | Source |
|---|---|---|---|---|---|
| September 16 | Oglethorpe* | Sirrine Stadium; Greenville, SC | W 13–6 | 7,500 | |
| September 23 | at Bucknell* | Memorial Stadium; Lewisburg, PA | L 6–28 | 7,000 | |
| September 30 | at George Washington* | Griffith Stadium; Washington, DC | L 0–7 | 8,000 | |
| October 7 | at Georgia* | Sanford Stadium; Athens, GA | L 7–38 | | |
| October 15 | The Citadel | Sirrine Stadium; Greenville, SC (rivalry) | L 6–9 | 10,000 | |
| October 22 | at NC State | Riddick Stadium; Raleigh, NC | T 7–7 | 7,500 | |
| October 29 | Davidson | Sirrine Stadium; Greenville, SC | L 12–13 | | |
| November 5 | at Marshall* | Fairfield Stadium; Huntington, WV | W 18–13 | 8,000 | |
| November 12 | South Carolina | Sirrine Stadium; Greenville, SC | L 6–27 | 12,500 | |
| November 24 | at Clemson | Riggs Field; Clemson, SC | L 7–10 | 12,500 | |
*Non-conference game
