= 1938 NC State Wolfpack football team =

American college football season

1938 NC State Wolfpack football
- Conference: Southern Conference
- Record: 3–7–1 (3–3–1 SoCon)
- Head coach: Williams Newton (2nd season)
- Home stadium: Riddick Stadium

1938 Southern Conference football standings
	Conf.					Overall
Team	W		L		T	W		L		T
No. 3 Duke $	5	–	0	–	0	9	–	1	–	0
Clemson	3	–	0	–	1	7	–	1	–	1
VMI	4	–	0	–	3	6	–	1	–	4
North Carolina	4	–	1	–	0	6	–	2	–	1
Richmond	3	–	2	–	1	6	–	3	–	1
Washington and Lee	2	–	2	–	0	4	–	4	–	1
NC State	3	–	3	–	1	3	–	7	–	1
South Carolina	2	–	2	–	0	6	–	4	–	1
Wake Forest	3	–	4	–	1	4	–	5	–	1
VPI	2	–	3	–	2	3	–	5	–	2
The Citadel	2	–	3	–	0	6	–	5	–	0
Maryland	1	–	2	–	0	2	–	7	–	0
Davidson	2	–	6	–	0	4	–	6	–	0
Furman	0	–	4	–	1	2	–	7	–	1
William & Mary	0	–	4	–	0	3	–	7	–	0
$ – Conference champion; Rankings from AP Poll

The 1938 NC State Wolfpack football team was an American football team that represented North Carolina State University as a member of the Southern Conference (SoCon) during the 1938 college football season. In its second season under head coach Williams Newton, the team compiled a 3–7–1 record (3–3–1 against SoCon opponents) and was outscored by a total of 100 to 59.

== Schedule ==
Date	Opponent	Site	Result	Attendance	Source
September 24	vs. Davidson	American Legion Memorial Stadium; Charlotte, NC	W 19–7	10,000	
October 1	North Carolina	Riddick Stadium; Raleigh, NC (rivalry)	L 0–21	19,000	
October 8	at Alabama*	Denny Stadium; Tuscaloosa, AL	L 0–14	10,000	
October 15	Wake Forest	Riddick Stadium; Raleigh, NC (rivalry)	W 19–7	17,000	
October 22	Furman	Riddick Stadium; Raleigh, NC	T 7–7	7,500	
October 29	at VPI	Miles Stadium; Blacksburg, VA	L 0–7	8,500	
November 5	at Manhattan*	Yankee Stadium; Bronx, NY	L 0–3	8,000	
November 12	Detroit*	Riddick Stadium; Raleigh, NC	L 0–7	8,000	
November 19	at No. 4 Duke	Duke Stadium; Durham, NC (rivalry)	L 0–7	11,000	
November 24	No. 7 Carnegie Tech	Riddick Stadium; Raleigh, NC	L 0–14	12,000	
December 3	vs. The Citadel	Legion Stadium; Wilmington, NC	W 14–6	9,000	
*Non-conference game; Rankings from AP Poll released prior to the game
