= 1938 Hardin–Simmons Cowboys football team =

American college football season

1938 Hardin–Simmons Cowboys football
- Conference: Independent
- Record: 8–2
- Head coach: Frank Kimbrough (4th season)

1938 Southern college football independents records
	Conf.			Overall
Team	W	L	T	W		L		T
Georgetown		–		8	–	0	–	0
Hardin–Simmons		–		8	–	2	–	0
Roanoke		–		5	–	2	–	3
Western Maryland		–		5	–	2	–	1
Catholic University		–		5	–	3	–	0
George Washington		–		5	–	4	–	0
Navy		–		4	–	3	–	2
Virginia		–		4	–	4	–	1
West Virginia		–		4	–	5	–	1
Loyola (LA)		–		4	–	5	–	0
South Georgia Teachers		–		3	–	5	–	1
William & Mary Norfolk		–		3	–	5	–	1
Delaware		–		3	–	5	–	0
Delaware State		–		1	–	2	–	0
Oklahoma City		–		2	–	8	–	0
East Carolina		–		1	–	6	–	1

The 1938 Hardin–Simmons Cowboys football team was an American football team that represented Hardin–Simmons University as an independent during the 1938 college football season. In its fourth season under head coach Frank Kimbrough, the team compiled an 8–2 record.

== Schedule ==
Date	Opponent	Site	Result	Attendance	Source
September 17	Daniel Baker	Parramore Field; Abilene, TX	W 27–0		
September 23	at San Francisco	Seals Stadium; San Francisco, CA	L 0–20	6,500	
October 1	Centenary	Parramore Field; Abilene, TX	L 13–26	4,500	
October 14	West Texas State	Parramore Field; Abilene, TX	W 39–0		
October 22	vs. Murray State	Keiler Field; Paducah, KY	W 20–14		
October 29	East Texas State	Parramore Field; Abilene, TX	W 27–6		
November 5	at Arizona State	Phoenix Union High School; Phoenix, AZ	W 12–7		
November 19	at Loyola (CA)	Gilmore Stadium; Los Angeles, CA	W 19–0	6,000	
November 24	at Oklahoma City	Goldbug Field; Oklahoma City, OK	W 37–6	1,000	
December 3	at Howard Payne	Howard Payne Stadium; Brownwood, TX	W 7–6	5,000	
