= J. D. Alexander (coach) =

American football coach

- Alexander pictured in The Tecoan 1938, ECU yearbook

Biographical details
- Born: May 15, 1899; Jacoby, Hunt County, Texas, U.S.
- Died: June 16, 1962 (aged 63); Clarksville City, Texas, U.S.

Coaching career (HC unless noted)

Football
- 1930–1931: Lincoln Memorial
- 1937–1938: East Carolina

Head coaching record
- Overall: 11–24–2 (football)

Joseph Dalry "Swede" Alexander (May 15, 1899 – June 16, 1962) was the head coach of the Lincoln Memorial University (1930–1931) and East Carolina University (1937–1938) college football programs.

== Head coaching record ==
=== Football ===
Year	Team	Overall	Conference	Standing	Bowl/playoffs
Lincoln Memorial Railsplitters (Smoky Mountain Conference) (1930–1931)
1930	Lincoln Memorial	4–6	2–0	2nd	
1931	Lincoln Memorial	4–7–1	1–3–1	5th	
Lincoln Memorial:		8–13–1	3–3–1		
East Carolina Pirates (Independent) (1937–1938)
1937	East Carolina	2–5			
1938	East Carolina	1–6–1			
East Carolina:		3–11–1			
Total:		11–24–2			
