= Hank Hardwick =

American football player and coach

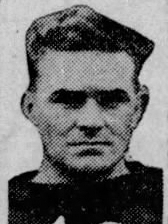
- Hardwick, circa 1926

Profile
- Positions: center (1919–20) and defensive end (1921–26)

Personal information
- Born: October 20, 1903
- Died: October 27, 1961 (aged 58)
- Listed weight: 180 lb (82 kg)

Career information
- High school: Blacksburg High School
- College: Virginia Tech (1919-22); Navy (1924–26)

Other information
- Coaching career

Coaching career (HC unless noted)
- 1928–1929: Navy (ends)
- 1931: Navy (plebe ends)
- 1933: Navy (plebe assistant)
- 1934: Navy (plebes)
- 1937–1938: Navy

Head coaching record
- Overall: 8–7–3

Harry Judson Hardwick (October 20, 1903–October 27, 1961) was an American college football player and coach. He was the 22nd head football coach at the United States Naval Academy in Annapolis, Maryland, serving for two seasons, from 1937 to 1938, and compiling a record of 8–7–3. Before this, he played college football for eight seasons. He first played for the VPI (Virginia Tech) Gobblers, as center for his first two seasons and defensive end for other two seasons. He was team captain during his final season at VPI. He then played four seasons as a defensive end for the Navy Midshipmen.

== Early life ==
Hardwick grew up in Virginia Hardwick's family was well known in the sport of American football. He was the younger brother of James "Jim" Hardwick, who was captain of the VPI Gobblers football team and a member of the 1921 Vanderbilt Commodores football team. Hardwick and his older brother both played football at Blacksburg High School, which Hardwick graduate from. A 1923 story published in The Roanoke Times opined that the two brothers were "probably the greatest football stars ever turned out by the local high school."

== Collegiate football playing career ==
Hardwick played collegiate American football for eight seasons, playing as a center for his first two college seasons, and as an end thereafter.

=== VPI Gobblers (1919–1922) ===
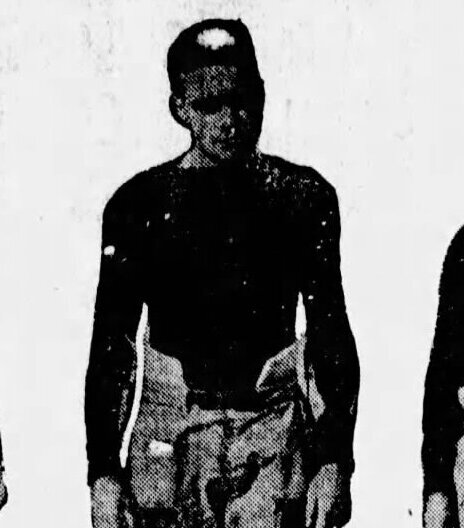
Hardwick, circa 1921

While attending Virginia Polytechnic Institute (Virginia Tech), Hardwick played four seasons on the VPI Gobblers football collegiate team (today known as the "Virginia Tech Hokies"). He had been referred to the team by Curly Byrd (coach of the Maryland State football).

In Hardwick first two seasons on the team (1919 and 1920), he played center. During his first season, his older brother was team captain. The Roanoke Times described him as having been light in weight during his early collegiate career, describing him as being, "the lightest center in South Atlantic history."

For the entirety the 1921 season (his third), Hardwick was moved from center and instead played left defensive end. Hardwick was regarded to have been a star player in the 1921 season. A 1921 article published in The Roanoke Times described, "Hardwick is a fast and aggressive end, and lives up to all the traditions that gave made the name 'Hardwick' famous in the football annals." During the team's 1922 season (his senior year), he was its captain, having been voted the team's 1922 captain on November 20, 1921 soon after the close of the previous season.

=== Navy Midshipmen (1923–26) ===
Navy Midshipmen player portrait of Hardwick

In 1923, Hardwick enrolled in the United States Naval Academy and joined the Navy Midshipmen football team. Hardwick played for the team during its 1923, 1924, 1925 and 1926 seasons.

In his plebe (freshman) year at Navy, Hardwick played left end.

During the team's highly successful 1926 season, Hardwick played right end, while Rusell Lloyd played left end. That season, sports writer Irving Vaughan wrote, "Hardwick is considered the most experienced performer on the Navy [team]...He's a rugged fellow of 180 pounds, powerful on defense and especially foxy at rushing kickers and passing." He credited Hardwick's rushing (aided by teammate Daniel Thomas Eddy's efforts) as the primary factor during Navy's victory over the Michigan Wolverines in achieving Navy's success at thwarting attempted passes by Benny Friedman (Michigan's quarterback). Hardwick also played as the team's right end for the entirety of the 1926 Army–Navy Game.

== Coaching career at Navy ==
Hardwick joined Navy's coaching staff. From 1928 and 1929, he was the coach for ends. In 1931 he coached the plebe (freshman) class ends. 1933 he was assistant coach for plebe (freshman) players, and in 1934 he was the coach for plebes players.

Hardwick served as coach of Navy Midshipmen football for two seasons (1937 and 1938. As head coach, he compiled a record of 8–7–3.

== Personal life ==
As the time of the 1926 football season, Hardwick's personal residence was located in Lexinburg, Virginia.

== Head coaching record ==
Year	Team	Overall	Conference	Standing	Bowl/playoffs
Navy Midshipmen (Independent) (1937–1938)
1937	Navy	4–4–1			
1938	Navy	4–3–2			
Navy:		8–7–3			
Total:		8–7–3			
