= 1938 North Carolina Tar Heels football team =

American college football season

1938 North Carolina Tar Heels football
- Conference: Southern Conference
- Record: 6–2–1 (4–1 SoCon)
- Head coach: Raymond Wolf (3rd season)
- Captains: Steve Maronic; George Watson
- Home stadium: Kenan Memorial Stadium

1938 Southern Conference football standings
	Conf.					Overall
Team	W		L		T	W		L		T
No. 3 Duke $	5	–	0	–	0	9	–	1	–	0
Clemson	3	–	0	–	1	7	–	1	–	1
VMI	4	–	0	–	3	6	–	1	–	4
North Carolina	4	–	1	–	0	6	–	2	–	1
Richmond	3	–	2	–	1	6	–	3	–	1
Washington and Lee	2	–	2	–	0	4	–	4	–	1
NC State	3	–	3	–	1	3	–	7	–	1
South Carolina	2	–	2	–	0	6	–	4	–	1
Wake Forest	3	–	4	–	1	4	–	5	–	1
VPI	2	–	3	–	2	3	–	5	–	2
The Citadel	2	–	3	–	0	6	–	5	–	0
Maryland	1	–	2	–	0	2	–	7	–	0
Davidson	2	–	6	–	0	4	–	6	–	0
Furman	0	–	4	–	1	2	–	7	–	1
William & Mary	0	–	4	–	0	3	–	7	–	0
$ – Conference champion; Rankings from AP Poll

The 1938 North Carolina Tar Heels football team represented the University of North Carolina at Chapel Hill during the 1938 college football season. The Tar Heels were led by third-year head coach Raymond Wolf and played their home games at Kenan Memorial Stadium. They competed as a member of the Southern Conference.

Team co-captain and tackle Steve Maronic was selected as a first-team All-American by the Central Press Association, and a second-team All-American by Newsweek, NEA, and United Press.

== Schedule ==
Date	Time	Opponent	Rank	Site	Result	Attendance	Source
September 24	2:30 p.m.	Wake Forest		Kenan Memorial Stadium; Chapel Hill, NC (rivalry)	W 14–6	15,000	
October 1	2:30 p.m.	at NC State		Riddick Stadium; Raleigh, NC (rivalry)	W 21–0	19,000	
October 8	2:00 p.m.	Tulane*		Kenan Memorial Stadium; Chapel Hill, NC	L 14–17	22,000	
October 15	2:00 p.m.	at NYU*		Yankee Stadium (I); Bronx, NY	W 7–0	15,000	
October 22	2:00 p.m.	at Davidson	No. 19	Richardson Stadium; Davidson, NC	W 34–0	6,500	
October 29	2:00 p.m.	No. 11 Duke		Kenan Memorial Stadium; Chapel Hill, NC (rivalry)	L 0–14	35,000	
November 5	2:00 p.m	VPI		Kenan Memorial Stadium; Chapel Hill, NC	W 7–0	18,000	
November 12	2:00 p.m.	at No. 13 Fordham*		Polo Grounds (IV); New York, NY	T 0–0	21,416	
November 24	2:00 p.m.	at Virginia*		Scott Stadium; Charlottesville, VA (South's Oldest Rivalry)	W 20–0	7,500	
*Non-conference game; Rankings from AP Poll released prior to the game; All times are in Eastern time
