= 1938 Maryland Terrapins football team =

American college football season

1938 Maryland Terrapins football
- Conference: Southern Conference
- Record: 2–7 (1–2 SoCon)
- Head coach: Frank Dobson (3rd season)
- Home stadium: Byrd Stadium (original)

1938 Southern Conference football standings
	Conf.					Overall
Team	W		L		T	W		L		T
No. 3 Duke $	5	–	0	–	0	9	–	1	–	0
Clemson	3	–	0	–	1	7	–	1	–	1
VMI	4	–	0	–	3	6	–	1	–	4
North Carolina	4	–	1	–	0	6	–	2	–	1
Richmond	3	–	2	–	1	6	–	3	–	1
Washington and Lee	2	–	2	–	0	4	–	4	–	1
NC State	3	–	3	–	1	3	–	7	–	1
South Carolina	2	–	2	–	0	6	–	4	–	1
Wake Forest	3	–	4	–	1	4	–	5	–	1
VPI	2	–	3	–	2	3	–	5	–	2
The Citadel	2	–	3	–	0	6	–	5	–	0
Maryland	1	–	2	–	0	2	–	7	–	0
Davidson	2	–	6	–	0	4	–	6	–	0
Furman	0	–	4	–	1	2	–	7	–	1
William & Mary	0	–	4	–	0	3	–	7	–	0
$ – Conference champion; Rankings from AP Poll

The 1938 Maryland Terrapins football team represented the University of Maryland in the 1938 college football season. In their third season under head coach Frank Dobson, the Terrapins compiled a 2–7 record (1–2 in conference), finished in 12th place in the Southern Conference, and were outscored by their opponents 235 to 86.

== Schedule ==
Date	Opponent	Site	Result	Attendance	Source
September 24	Richmond	Byrd Stadium; College Park, MD	L 6–19	6,000	
October 1	at Penn State*	New Beaver Field; State College, PA (rivalry)	L 0–33	12,000	
October 8	at Syracuse*	Archbold Stadium; Syracuse, NY	L 0–53	12,000	
October 15	vs. Western Maryland*	Municipal Stadium; Baltimore, MD	W 14–8	8,000	
October 22	Virginia*	Byrd Stadium; College Park, MD (rivalry)	L 19–27	5,000	
October 29	VMI	Byrd Stadium; College Park, MD	L 14–47		
November 12	at Florida*	Florida Field; Gainesville, FL	L 7–21	10,000	
November 19	Georgetown*	Byrd Stadium; College Park, MD	L 7–14	10,000	
November 24	vs. Washington and Lee	Municipal Stadium; Baltimore, MD	W 19–13		
*Non-conference game
