= 1938 George Washington Colonials football team =

American college football season

1938 George Washington Colonials football
- Conference: Independent
- Record: 5–4
- Head coach: Bill Reinhart (1st season)
- Home stadium: Griffith Stadium

1938 Southern college football independents records
| | Conf. | | | Overall |
| Team | W | L | T | W | | L | | T |
|---|---|---|---|---|---|---|---|---|
| Georgetown | | – | | 8 | – | 0 | – | 0 |
| Hardin–Simmons | | – | | 8 | – | 2 | – | 0 |
| Roanoke | | – | | 5 | – | 2 | – | 3 |
| Western Maryland | | – | | 5 | – | 2 | – | 1 |
| Catholic University | | – | | 5 | – | 3 | – | 0 |
| George Washington | | – | | 5 | – | 4 | – | 0 |
| Navy | | – | | 4 | – | 3 | – | 2 |
| Virginia | | – | | 4 | – | 4 | – | 1 |
| West Virginia | | – | | 4 | – | 5 | – | 1 |
| Loyola (LA) | | – | | 4 | – | 5 | – | 0 |
| South Georgia Teachers | | – | | 3 | – | 5 | – | 1 |
| William & Mary Norfolk | | – | | 3 | – | 5 | – | 1 |
| Delaware | | – | | 3 | – | 5 | – | 0 |
| Delaware State | | – | | 1 | – | 2 | – | 0 |
| Oklahoma City | | – | | 2 | – | 8 | – | 0 |
| East Carolina | | – | | 1 | – | 6 | – | 1 |

The 1938 George Washington Colonials football team was an American football team that represented George Washington University as an independent during the 1938 college football season. In its first season under head coach Bill Reinhart, the team compiled a 5–4 record, scored 82 points, and allowed opponents to score 82 points.

Reinhart was hired as the team's head coach in January 1938. Key players included triple-threat man and halfback Vic Sampson.

== Schedule ==
| Date | Time | Opponent | Site | Result | Attendance | Source |
|---|---|---|---|---|---|---|
| September 30 | | Furman | Griffith Stadium; Washington, DC | W 7–0 | 8,000-10,000 | |
| October 7 | | Butler | Griffith Stadium; Washington, DC | W 26–0 | 10,000 | |
| October 15 | | at Colorado | Colorado Stadium; Boulder, CO | W 13–0 | 8,000 | |
| October 21 | | Davis & Elkins | Griffith Stadium; Washington, DC | W 27–0 | | |
| October 29 | | Ole Miss | Griffith Stadium; Washington, DC | L 0–25 | | |
| November 5 | 2:30 p.m. | vs. Clemson | Sirrine Stadium; Greenville, SC | L 0–27 | 10,000 | |
| November 12 | | Kansas | Griffith Stadium; Washington, DC | W 9–7 | 10,000 | |
| November 19 | | at Bucknell | Memorial Stadium; Lewisburg, PA | L 0–16 | 2,000 | |
| November 24 | | West Virginia | Griffith Stadium; Washington, DC | L 6–7 | 5,000 | |

== Players ==
- Sam Babich, end
- Bob Faris, lineman
- Sunny Jones, center
- Frank Merka, quarterback
- Bob Nowaskey, end
- John Rebholz, tackle and captain
- Guy Renzaglia, guard
- Billy Richardson, halfback, junior
- Wilbur Saeger, tackle
- Vic Sampson, halfback
- Hal Schiering, lineman
- Johnny Tonkavitch, fullback, sophomore
- Izzy Weinberg, guard
