= 1938 Catholic University Cardinals football team =

American college football season

1938 Catholic University Cardinals football
- Conference: Independent
- Record: 5–3
- Head coach: Dutch Bergman (9th season)
- Home stadium: Brookland Stadium, Griffith Stadium

1938 Southern college football independents records
	Conf.			Overall
Team	W	L	T	W		L		T
Georgetown		–		8	–	0	–	0
Hardin–Simmons		–		8	–	2	–	0
Roanoke		–		5	–	2	–	3
Western Maryland		–		5	–	2	–	1
Catholic University		–		5	–	3	–	0
George Washington		–		5	–	4	–	0
Navy		–		4	–	3	–	2
Virginia		–		4	–	4	–	1
West Virginia		–		4	–	5	–	1
Loyola (LA)		–		4	–	5	–	0
South Georgia Teachers		–		3	–	5	–	1
William & Mary Norfolk		–		3	–	5	–	1
Delaware		–		3	–	5	–	0
Delaware State		–		1	–	2	–	0
Oklahoma City		–		2	–	8	–	0
East Carolina		–		1	–	6	–	1

The 1938 Catholic University Cardinals football team was an American football team that represented the Catholic University of America as an independent during the 1938 college football season. In its ninth year under head coach Dutch Bergman, the team compiled a 5–3 record and outscored opponents by a total of 69 to 60.

== Schedule ==
Date	Opponent	Site	Result	Attendance	Source
October 2	at St. Bonaventure	Olean, NY	W 13–0	6,000	
October 7	at Detroit	University of Detroit Stadium; Detroit, MI	L 0–27		
October 22	West Virginia Wesleyan	Brookland Stadium; Washington, DC	W 21–0	3,100	
October 29	Saint Louis	Brookland Stadium; Washington, DC	L 0–13	1,500	
November 5	at DePaul	Wrigley Field; Chicago, IL	W 14–13		
November 11	Miami (FL)	Brookland Stadium; Washington, DC	W 7–0		
November 20	at Loyola (LA)	Loyola University Stadium; New Orleans, LA	W 14–0	4,000	
November 28	South Carolina	Griffith Stadium; Washington, DC	L 0–7		
