= 1938 Davidson Wildcats football team =

American college football season

1938 Davidson Wildcats football
- Conference: Southern Conference
- Record: 4–6 (2–6 SoCon)
- Head coach: Gene McEver (3rd season)
- Home stadium: Richardson Field

1938 Southern Conference football standings
	Conf.					Overall
Team	W		L		T	W		L		T
No. 3 Duke $	5	–	0	–	0	9	–	1	–	0
Clemson	3	–	0	–	1	7	–	1	–	1
VMI	4	–	0	–	3	6	–	1	–	4
North Carolina	4	–	1	–	0	6	–	2	–	1
Richmond	3	–	2	–	1	6	–	3	–	1
Washington and Lee	2	–	2	–	0	4	–	4	–	1
NC State	3	–	3	–	1	3	–	7	–	1
South Carolina	2	–	2	–	0	6	–	4	–	1
Wake Forest	3	–	4	–	1	4	–	5	–	1
VPI	2	–	3	–	2	3	–	5	–	2
The Citadel	2	–	3	–	0	6	–	5	–	0
Maryland	1	–	2	–	0	2	–	7	–	0
Davidson	2	–	6	–	0	4	–	6	–	0
Furman	0	–	4	–	1	2	–	7	–	1
William & Mary	0	–	4	–	0	3	–	7	–	0
$ – Conference champion; Rankings from AP Poll

The 1938 Davidson Wildcats football team was an American football team that represented Davidson College during the 1938 college football season as a member of the Southern Conference. In their third year under head coach Gene McEver, the team compiled an overall record of 4–6, with a mark of 2–6 in conference play, and finished in 13th place in the SoCon.

== Schedule ==
Date	Opponent	Site	Result	Attendance	Source
September 17	at The Citadel	Johnson Hagood Stadium; Charleston, SC	W 12–6		
September 24	vs. NC State	American Legion Memorial Stadium; Charlotte, NC	L 7–19	10,000	
October 1	at Duke	Duke Stadium; Durham, NC	L 0–27	6,000	
October 7	Erskine*	Richardson Field; Davidson, NC	W 33–0		
October 14	vs. South Carolina	Sumter County Fair Grounds; Sumter, SC	L 0–25		
October 22	No. 19 North Carolina	Richardson Field; Davidson, NC	L 0–34	6,500	
October 29	at Furman	Sirrine Stadium; Greenville, SC	W 13–12		
November 5	Wofford*	Richardson Field; Davidson, NC	W 29–0		
November 12	VMI	Richardson Field; Davidson, NC	L 6–19	4,000	
November 24	vs. Wake Forest	American Legion Memorial Stadium; Charlotte, NC	L 0–21	7,000	
*Non-conference game; Rankings from AP Poll released prior to the game
