= 1938 Clemson Tigers football team =

American college football season

1938 Clemson Tigers football
- Conference: Southern Conference
- Record: 7–1–1 (3–0–1 SoCon)
- Head coach: Jess Neely (8th season)
- Captain: Charlie Woods
- Home stadium: Riggs Field

1938 Southern Conference football standings
	Conf.					Overall
Team	W		L		T	W		L		T
No. 3 Duke $	5	–	0	–	0	9	–	1	–	0
Clemson	3	–	0	–	1	7	–	1	–	1
VMI	4	–	0	–	3	6	–	1	–	4
North Carolina	4	–	1	–	0	6	–	2	–	1
Richmond	3	–	2	–	1	6	–	3	–	1
Washington and Lee	2	–	2	–	0	4	–	4	–	1
NC State	3	–	3	–	1	3	–	7	–	1
South Carolina	2	–	2	–	0	6	–	4	–	1
Wake Forest	3	–	4	–	1	4	–	5	–	1
VPI	2	–	3	–	2	3	–	5	–	2
The Citadel	2	–	3	–	0	6	–	5	–	0
Maryland	1	–	2	–	0	2	–	7	–	0
Davidson	2	–	6	–	0	4	–	6	–	0
Furman	0	–	4	–	1	2	–	7	–	1
William & Mary	0	–	4	–	0	3	–	7	–	0
$ – Conference champion; Rankings from AP Poll

The 1938 Clemson Tigers football team was an American football team that represented Clemson College in the Southern Conference during the 1938 college football season. In their eighth season under head coach Jess Neely, the Tigers compiled a 7–1–1 record (3–0–1 against conference opponents), finished second in the conference, and outscored opponents by a total of 145 to 56.

Center Charlie Woods was the team captain. The team's statistical leaders included tailback Bob Bailey with 272 passing yards, fullback Don Willis with 483 rushing yards, and tailback Banks McFadden and wingback Shad Bryant with 30 points scored (each with five touchdowns). McFadden remained with Clemson for more than 40 years as a coach and administrator and was inducted into the College Football Hall of Fame in 1959.

Two Clemson players were named to the All-Southern team: end Gus Goins and back Don Willis.

== Schedule ==
Date	Time	Opponent	Site	Result	Attendance	Source
September 17		Presbyterian*	Riggs Field; Clemson, SC	W 26–0		
September 24		at Tulane*	Tulane Stadium; New Orleans, LA	W 13–10	12,000	
October 1		at Tennessee*	Shields–Watkins Field; Knoxville, TN	L 7–20	16,000	
October 8		vs. VMI	American Legion Memorial Stadium; Charlotte, NC	T 7–7		
October 20		at South Carolina	Municipal Stadium; Columbia, SC (rivalry)	W 34–12	22,500	
October 28		at Wake Forest	Gore Field; Wake Forest, NC	W 7–0	7,500	
November 5	2:30 p.m.	vs. George Washington	Sirrine Stadium; Greenville, SC	W 27–0	10,000	
November 12		at Kentucky*	McLean Stadium; Lexington, KY	W 14–0	6,000	
November 24		Furman	Riggs Field; Clemson, SC	W 10–7	12,500	
*Non-conference game
