= 1938 South Georgia Teachers Blue Tide football team =

American college football season

1938 South Georgia Teachers Blue Tide football
- Conference: Independent
- Record: 3–5–1
- Head coach: Crook Smith (10th season)

1938 Southern college football independents records
	Conf.			Overall
Team	W	L	T	W		L		T
Georgetown		–		8	–	0	–	0
Hardin–Simmons		–		8	–	2	–	0
Roanoke		–		5	–	2	–	3
Western Maryland		–		5	–	2	–	1
Catholic University		–		5	–	3	–	0
George Washington		–		5	–	4	–	0
Navy		–		4	–	3	–	2
Virginia		–		4	–	4	–	1
West Virginia		–		4	–	5	–	1
Loyola (LA)		–		4	–	5	–	0
South Georgia Teachers		–		3	–	5	–	1
William & Mary Norfolk		–		3	–	5	–	1
Delaware		–		3	–	5	–	0
Delaware State		–		1	–	2	–	0
Oklahoma City		–		2	–	8	–	0
East Carolina		–		1	–	6	–	1

The 1938 South Georgia Teachers Blue Tide football team represented the South Georgia Teachers College—now known as Georgia Southern University—during the 1938 college football season. The team was led by Crook Smith in his tenth year as head coach.

== Schedule ==
Date	Time	Opponent	Site	Result	Attendance	Source
September 23	8:15 p.m.	at Tampa	Phillips Field; Tampa, FL	L 0–40	5,000	
September 30		Wingate	Statesboro, GA	W 6–0		
October 7	8:00 p.m.	at Stetson	Hulley Field; Deland, FL	L 0–28		
October 14		Troy State	Statesboro, GA	L 0–7		
October 21		at Armstrong	Savannah, GA	L 7–12		
October 28		South Georgia	Statesboro, GA	L 6–7		
November 5		at Snead	Boaz, AL	W 7–0		
November 11		Middle Georgia	Statesboro, GA	W 3–0		
November 24		Erskine^{†}	Statesboro, GA	T 6–6		
^{†}Homecoming; All times are in Eastern time
