= 1938 Georgetown Hoyas football team =

American college football season

1938 Georgetown Hoyas football
- Conference: Independent
- Record: 8–0
- Head coach: Jack Hagerty (7th season)
- Captain: Game captains
- Home stadium: Griffith Stadium

1938 Southern college football independents records
	Conf.			Overall
Team	W	L	T	W		L		T
Georgetown		–		8	–	0	–	0
Hardin–Simmons		–		8	–	2	–	0
Roanoke		–		5	–	2	–	3
Western Maryland		–		5	–	2	–	1
Catholic University		–		5	–	3	–	0
George Washington		–		5	–	4	–	0
Navy		–		4	–	3	–	2
Virginia		–		4	–	4	–	1
West Virginia		–		4	–	5	–	1
Loyola (LA)		–		4	–	5	–	0
South Georgia Teachers		–		3	–	5	–	1
William & Mary Norfolk		–		3	–	5	–	1
Delaware		–		3	–	5	–	0
Delaware State		–		1	–	2	–	0
Oklahoma City		–		2	–	8	–	0
East Carolina		–		1	–	6	–	1

The 1938 Georgetown Hoyas football team, also known as the New Deal team, was an American football team that represented Georgetown University as an independent team during the 1938 college football season. In their seventh season under head coach Jack Hagerty, the Hoyas compiled a perfect 8–0 record, shut out five of eight opponents, and outscored all opponents by a total of 185 to 26. The team was ranked No. 20 in the AP Poll of November 21 but dropped out of the final poll.

The team played its home games at Griffith Stadium in Washington, D.C.

Halfback Joe Mellendeck led the team with his running, kicking, and defensive play.

== Schedule ==
Date	Opponent	Site	Result	Attendance	Source
October 1	Hampden–Sydney	Griffith Stadium; Washington, DC	W 51–0	4,000	
October 8	Roanoke	Griffith Stadium; Washington, DC	W 33–6	5,000	
October 15	Randolph–Macon	Griffith Stadium; Washington, DC	W 33–0		
October 22	at Manhattan	Yankee Stadium; Bronx, NY	W 14–13	15,000	
October 28	at Temple	Temple Stadium; Philadelphia, PA	W 13–0	10,000	
November 4	Bucknell	Griffith Stadium; Washington, DC	W 13–0	15,000	
November 12	at West Virginia	Mountaineer Field; Morgantown, WV	W 14–0	14,000	
November 19	at Maryland	Byrd Stadium; College Park, MD	W 14–7	8,000	
