= 1938 The Citadel Bulldogs football team =

American college football season

1938 The Citadel Bulldogs football

State champion
- Conference: Southern Conference
- Record: 6–5 (2–3 SoCon)
- Head coach: Tatum Gressette (7th season)
- Home stadium: Johnson Hagood Stadium

1938 Southern Conference football standings
	Conf.					Overall
Team	W		L		T	W		L		T
No. 3 Duke $	5	–	0	–	0	9	–	1	–	0
Clemson	3	–	0	–	1	7	–	1	–	1
VMI	4	–	0	–	3	6	–	1	–	4
North Carolina	4	–	1	–	0	6	–	2	–	1
Richmond	3	–	2	–	1	6	–	3	–	1
Washington and Lee	2	–	2	–	0	4	–	4	–	1
NC State	3	–	3	–	1	3	–	7	–	1
South Carolina	2	–	2	–	0	6	–	4	–	1
Wake Forest	3	–	4	–	1	4	–	5	–	1
VPI	2	–	3	–	2	3	–	5	–	2
The Citadel	2	–	3	–	0	6	–	5	–	0
Maryland	1	–	2	–	0	2	–	7	–	0
Davidson	2	–	6	–	0	4	–	6	–	0
Furman	0	–	4	–	1	2	–	7	–	1
William & Mary	0	–	4	–	0	3	–	7	–	0
$ – Conference champion; Rankings from AP Poll

The 1938 The Citadel Bulldogs football team represented The Citadel, The Military College of South Carolina in the 1938 college football season. Tatum Gressette served as head coach for the seventh season. The Bulldogs played as members of the Southern Conference and played home games at Johnson Hagood Stadium.

== Schedule ==
Date	Opponent	Site	Result	Attendance	Source
September 17	Davidson	Johnson Hagood Stadium; Charleston, SC	L 6–12		
September 24	at Georgia*	Sanford Stadium; Athens, GA	L 12–20	7,000	
September 30	vs. Wake Forest	American Legion Memorial Stadium; Charlotte, NC	L 0–31	5,000	
October 7	at Presbyterian*	Bailey Stadium; Clinton, SC	W 12–0		
October 15	at Furman	Sirrine Stadium; Greenville, SC (rivalry)	W 9–6	10,000	
October 22	at No. 8 Tennessee*	Shields–Watkins Field; Knoxville, TN	L 0–44	8,000	
October 29	Wofford*	Johnson Hagood Stadium; Charleston, SC (rivalry)	W 27–0		
November 5	Richmond	Johnson Hagood Stadium; Charleston, SC	W 6–0	5,000	
November 11	Oglethorpe*	Johnson Hagood Stadium; Charleston, SC	W 26–8	4,000	
November 18	vs. Erskine*	Anderson, SC	W 33–13	2,500	
December 3	vs. NC State	Legion Stadium; Wilmington, NC	L 6–14	9,000	
*Non-conference game; Rankings from AP Poll released prior to the game
