= 1938 Delaware Fightin' Blue Hens football team =

American college football season

1938 Delaware Fightin' Blue Hens football
- Conference: Independent
- Record: 3–5
- Head coach: Stephen Grenda (1st season)
- Home stadium: Frazer Field

1938 Southern college football independents records
	Conf.			Overall
Team	W	L	T	W		L		T
Georgetown		–		8	–	0	–	0
Hardin–Simmons		–		8	–	2	–	0
Roanoke		–		5	–	2	–	3
Western Maryland		–		5	–	2	–	1
Catholic University		–		5	–	3	–	0
George Washington		–		5	–	4	–	0
Navy		–		4	–	3	–	2
Virginia		–		4	–	4	–	1
West Virginia		–		4	–	5	–	1
Loyola (LA)		–		4	–	5	–	0
South Georgia Teachers		–		3	–	5	–	1
William & Mary Norfolk		–		3	–	5	–	1
Delaware		–		3	–	5	–	0
Delaware State		–		1	–	2	–	0
Oklahoma City		–		2	–	8	–	0
East Carolina		–		1	–	6	–	1

The 1938 Delaware Fightin' Blue Hens football team was an American football team that represented the University of Delaware in the 1938 college football season. In their first season under head coach Stephen Grenda, the Blue Hens compiled a 3–5 record and were outscored by a total of 164 to 70. The team played its home games at Frazer Field in Newark, Delaware.

== Schedule ==
Date	Opponent	Site	Result	Attendance	Source
October 1	Ursinus	Frazer Field; Newark, DE	W 12–9		
October 8	Randolph–Macon	Frazer Field; Newark, DE	L 0–27		
October 15	at Dickinson	Biddle Field; Carlisle, PA	L 0–26		
October 22	Lehigh	Frazer Field; Newark, DE (rivalry)	L 0–32		
October 29	St. John's (MD)	Frazer Field; Newark, DE	W 41–0		
November 5	vs. Pennsylvania Military	Municipal Auditorium; Atlantic City, NJ	L 2–32	12,000	
November 12	Drexel	Frazer Field; Newark, DE	L 13–38		
November 19	at Washington College	Chestertown, MD	W 2–0		
