= Steve Maronic =

American football player (1917–1980)

No. 64, 44
- Position: Offensive tackle

Personal information
- Born: May 30, 1917; Harrisburg, Pennsylvania, U.S.
- Died: May 7, 1980 (aged 62); Durham, North Carolina, U.S.
- Listed height: 6 ft 0 in (1.83 m)
- Listed weight: 225 lb (102 kg)

Career information
- High school: Steelton (Steelton, Pennsylvania)
- College: North Carolina
- NFL draft: 1939: 5th round, 37th overall pick

Career history
- Detroit Lions (1939–1940)

Awards and highlights
- Second-team All-American (1938); First-team All-SoCon (1938)

Career NFL statistics
- Games played: 15
- Games started: 3
- Stats at Pro Football Reference

Steven Jesse Maronic (May 13, 1917 – May 7, 1980) was an American professional football player. He played college football at the University of North Carolina at Chapel Hill and professionally for two season in the National Football League (NFL) with the Detroit Lions. He was drafted in the fifth round of the 1939 NFL Draft.

Maronic played as a tackle and placekicker for the North Carolina Tar Heels. In 1938, he earned All-American and All-Southern Conference honors while helping the Tar Heels to a 6–2–1 record. He played almost 60 minutes of every game in the 1938 season. Two of his strongest performances came in front of the New York media, against NYU at Yankee Stadium and Fordham at the Polo Grounds, solidifying his All-American candidacy. Maronic was successful on 13 straight points after touchdown that season.
