= 1938 William & Mary Indians football team =

American college football season

1938 William & Mary Indians football
- Conference: Southern Conference
- Record: 2–7 (0–4 SoCon)
- Head coach: Branch Bocock (6th season)
- Captain: Herb Krueger
- Home stadium: Cary Field

1938 Southern Conference football standings
	Conf.					Overall
Team	W		L		T	W		L		T
No. 3 Duke $	5	–	0	–	0	9	–	1	–	0
Clemson	3	–	0	–	1	7	–	1	–	1
VMI	4	–	0	–	3	6	–	1	–	4
North Carolina	4	–	1	–	0	6	–	2	–	1
Richmond	3	–	2	–	1	6	–	3	–	1
Washington and Lee	2	–	2	–	0	4	–	4	–	1
NC State	3	–	3	–	1	3	–	7	–	1
South Carolina	2	–	2	–	0	6	–	4	–	1
Wake Forest	3	–	4	–	1	4	–	5	–	1
VPI	2	–	3	–	2	3	–	5	–	2
The Citadel	2	–	3	–	0	6	–	5	–	0
Maryland	1	–	2	–	0	2	–	7	–	0
Davidson	2	–	6	–	0	4	–	6	–	0
Furman	0	–	4	–	1	2	–	7	–	1
William & Mary	0	–	4	–	0	3	–	7	–	0
$ – Conference champion; Rankings from AP Poll

The 1938 William & Mary Indians football team represented the College of William & Mary as a member of the Southern Conference (SoCon) during the 1938 college football season. Led by sixth-year head coach Branch Bocock, the Indians compiled an overall record of 2–7 with a mark of 0–4 in conference play, and finished 15th in the SoCon. William & Mary played home games at Cary Field in Williamsburg, Virginia.

== Schedule ==
Date	Opponent	Site	Result	Attendance	Source
September 24	at Navy*	Thompson Stadium; Annapolis, MD	L 0–26	16,000	
October 1	Apprentice*	Cary Field; Williamsburg, VA	L 8–9		
October 8	at VPI	Miles Stadium; Blacksburg, VA	L 0–27	4,000	
October 14	Guilford*	Cary Field; Williamsburg, VA	W 45–0		
October 22	VMI^{†}	Cary Field; Williamsburg, VA (rivalry)	L 0–14	5,000	
October 29	at Virginia*	Scott Stadium; Charlottesville, VA	L 0–34	7,000	
November 5	Hapmden–Sydney*	Cary Field; Williamsburg, VA	W 18–7	2,000	
November 12	at Washington and Lee	Wilson Field; Lexington, VA	L 0–27		
November 24	at Richmond	City Stadium; Richmond, VA (rivalry)	L 7–10	5,500	
*Non-conference game; ^{†}Homecoming
