= Larry Craig (American football) =

American football player (1916–1992)

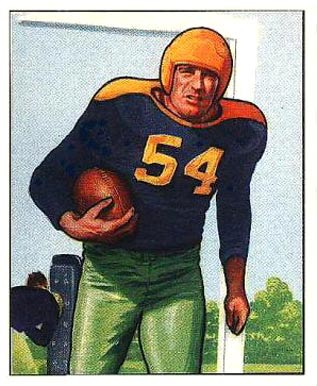
- Craig on a 1950 Bowman football card

No. 54
- Positions: End, Back

Personal information
- Born: June 27, 1916; Six Mile, South Carolina, U.S.
- Died: May 30, 1992 (aged 75); Ninety Six, South Carolina, U.S.
- Listed height: 6 ft 1 in (1.85 m)
- Listed weight: 211 lb (96 kg)

Career information
- High school: D.W. Daniel (Central, South Carolina)
- College: South Carolina (1935-1938)
- NFL draft: 1939: 6th round, 49th overall pick

Career history
- Green Bay Packers (1939–1949)

Awards and highlights
- 2× NFL champion (1939, 1944); Second-team All-Pro (1947); 3× Pro Bowl (1939, 1941-1942); Green Bay Packers Hall of Fame; First-team All-SoCon (1938)

Career NFL statistics
- Rushing yards: 16
- Rushing average: 1.6
- Receptions: 14
- Receiving yards: 155
- Stats at Pro Football Reference

Lawrence Gantt Craig (June 27, 1916 – May 30, 1992) was an American professional football player who played end, running back, defensive back, and quarterback for the Green Bay Packers in the National Football League (NFL) from 1939 to 1949. He was selected in the sixth round of the 1939 NFL draft.

== Early life and college ==
Craig was born in Six Mile, South Carolina, on June 27, 1916. He attended D. W. Daniel High School and played football for the University of South Carolina (USC). At USC, he also participated in track and basketball, captaining the football and track teams in 1938.

== Professional career ==
He made his debut in professional football for the Packers, when they chose him in the sixth round of the 1939 draft on recommendation from Rex Enright. In August 1941, Craig became one of the first two players ever to be fined by the NFL's league office, when commissioner Elmer Layden gave $25 fines to Craig and New York Giants halfback Hank Soar for fighting.

== Later life and death ==
In 1973, he was inducted into the Green Bay Packers Hall of Fame. After his retirement in 1949, he owned the Ninety Six Canning Company and a cattle farm. Craig died on May 31, 1992.
