= Marshall Edwards (American football) =

American football player (1915–2000)

No. 8, 18
- Position: Fullback

Personal information
- Born: October 19, 1915; Spray, North Carolina, U.S.
- Died: November 28, 2000 (aged 85); Charlotte, North Carolina, U.S.
- Listed height: 6 ft 1 in (1.85 m)
- Listed weight: 190 lb (86 kg)

Career information
- College: Wake Forrest

Career history
- Charlotte Clippers (1941); Brooklyn Dodgers (1943); Charlotte Clippers (1946)

Career statistics
- Games played: 1
- Receptions: 1
- Receiving yards: -4
- Rush attempts: 1
- Rushing yards: 5
- Stats at Pro Football Reference

Marshall Thomas Edwards (October 19, 1915 - November 28, 2000) was an American football fullback for the Brooklyn Dodgers for one game in 1943. He also played for the Charlotte Clippers in 1941 and in 1946.
