= 1938 VMI Keydets football team =

American college football season

1938 VMI Keydets football
- Conference: Southern Conference
- Record: 6–1–4 (4–0–3 SoCon)
- Head coach: Pooley Hubert (2nd season)
- Home stadium: Alumni Field

1938 Southern Conference football standings
	Conf.					Overall
Team	W		L		T	W		L		T
No. 3 Duke $	5	–	0	–	0	9	–	1	–	0
Clemson	3	–	0	–	1	7	–	1	–	1
VMI	4	–	0	–	3	6	–	1	–	4
North Carolina	4	–	1	–	0	6	–	2	–	1
Richmond	3	–	2	–	1	6	–	3	–	1
Washington and Lee	2	–	2	–	0	4	–	4	–	1
NC State	3	–	3	–	1	3	–	7	–	1
South Carolina	2	–	2	–	0	6	–	4	–	1
Wake Forest	3	–	4	–	1	4	–	5	–	1
VPI	2	–	3	–	2	3	–	5	–	2
The Citadel	2	–	3	–	0	6	–	5	–	0
Maryland	1	–	2	–	0	2	–	7	–	0
Davidson	2	–	6	–	0	4	–	6	–	0
Furman	0	–	4	–	1	2	–	7	–	1
William & Mary	0	–	4	–	0	3	–	7	–	0
$ – Conference champion; Rankings from AP Poll

The 1938 VMI Keydets football team was an American football team that represented the Virginia Military Institute (VMI) during the 1938 college football season as a member of the Southern Conference. In their second year under head coach Pooley Hubert, the team compiled an overall record of 6–1–4.

== Schedule ==
Date	Opponent	Site	Result	Attendance	Source
September 17	Elon*	Alumni Field; Lexington, VA	W 33–7		
September 24	at Virginia*	Scott Stadium; Charlottesville, VA	T 12–12	12,000	
October 1	at Navy*	Thompson Stadium; Annapolis, MD	L 0–26	20,000	
October 8	vs. Clemson	American Legion Memorial Stadium; Charlotte, NC	T 7–7		
October 15	at Richmond	City Stadium; Richmond, VA (rivalry)	W 13–6	12,000	
October 22	at William & Mary	Cary Field; Williamsburg, VA (rivalry)	W 14–0	5,000	
October 29	at Maryland	Byrd Stadium; College Park, MD	W 47–14		
November 5	Wake Forest	Alumni Field; Lexington, VA	T 6–6	4,000	
November 12	at Davidson	Richardson Field; Davidson, NC	W 19–6	4,000	
November 19	Roanoke*	Alumni Field; Lexington, VA	W 6–0	3,000	
November 24	vs. VPI	Maher Field; Roanoke, VA (rivalry)	T 2–2	15,000	
*Non-conference game
