= Dan Hill (American football) =

American football player (1917–1989)

Profile
- Positions: Center, linebacker

Personal information
- Born: March 8, 1917; Asheville, North Carolina, U.S.
- Died: August 24, 1989 (aged 72); Durham, North Carolina, U.S.

Career information
- College: Duke (1936–1938)

Awards and highlights
- First-team All-American (1938); 2× First-team All-SoCon (1936, 1938); Second-team All-SoCon (1937)
- College Football Hall of Fame (Class of 1962)

Dan "Tiger" Hill (March 8, 1917 – August 24, 1989) was an American football player. Born in Asheville, North Carolina, he played center and linebacker for the Duke Blue Devils football teams from 1936 to 1938. He was All-Southern Conference in 1936 and 1938, and All-American in 1938. He was co-captain of the 1938 "Iron Dukes", which did not allow a point during the regular season and lost the 1939 Rose Bowl, 7–3. That season, he finished tenth in the Heisman Trophy voting and was drafted by the Brooklyn Dodgers. He was inducted into the College Football Hall of Fame in 1962, and into the North Carolina Sports Hall of Fame in 1972. In 2014, ESPN named Hill's 1938 season the best individual season by a Duke football player.

After playing, he served as assistant athletic director at Duke until 1953. The school awards a "Dan 'Tiger' Hill Award" to the school's top offensive lineman.
