= Eric Tipton =

American baseball and football player (1915–2001)

- Left fielder
- Born: April 20, 1915; Petersburg, Virginia, U.S.
- Died: August 29, 2001 (aged 86); Newport News, Virginia, U.S.
- Batted: Right Threw: Right

MLB debut
- June 9, 1939, for the Philadelphia Athletics

Last MLB appearance
- September 29, 1945, for the Cincinnati Reds

MLB statistics
- Batting average: .270
- Home runs: 22
- Runs batted in: 151
- Stats at Baseball Reference

Teams
- Philadelphia Athletics (1939–1941); Cincinnati Reds (1942–1945)

Eric Gordon Tipton (April 20, 1915 – August 29, 2001) was an American professional baseball left fielder. He played in Major League Baseball (MLB) for the Philadelphia Athletics and Cincinnati Reds. Also known as a college football player, Tipton was inducted into the College Football Hall of Fame in 1965.

== Early life ==
Tipton was born in Petersburg, Virginia and attended Petersburg High School.

== College football career ==
Tipton played college football at Duke University as a running back and punter. While there, the Blue Devils won 25 games and lost only four, and won the Southern Conference championship in 1936 and 1938. For his college career, he rushed for 1,633 yards and scored 17 touchdowns. One of his most notable games came against Pittsburgh in 1938. During the game, Tipton had seven punts that stayed within Pitts' own 10-yard line, and another seven stopped inside the 20-yard line, as Duke won 7–0.

== Professional baseball career ==
Tipton was drafted by Washington in the thirteenth round of the 1939 NFL draft, but chose to play professional baseball instead. He played outfield for the Philadelphia Athletics (1939–1941) and the Cincinnati Reds (1942–1945). His best seasons in the majors were in 1943 and 1944, when he had 142 hits and batted .288 in '43, and had 144 hits and batted .301 in '44. Tipton then played in the American Association of Independent Professional Baseball with the St. Paul Saints, 1946–1951, and the Portland Beavers, 1952, of the Pacific Coast League.

In 501 games in seven seasons, Tipton posted a .270 batting average (439-for-1626) with 212 runs, 22 home runs, 151 RBI and 223 bases on balls. He finished his career with a .977 fielding percentage as an outfielder.

== Coaching career ==
During his off-season from baseball, Tipton was initially freshman football coach beginning in 1939 and in 1946 became an assistant football coach at The College of William & Mary. From 1953–57 he served as W&M's baseball coach prior to moving to West Point in 1957, where he was the lightweight football coach and baseball team head coach at the United States Military Academy. In 20 seasons at West Point, his baseball teams were 234–201–5 and won three league titles. His lightweight football teams were 104–14–1 for a .878 winning percentage with 13 league titles.

== Honors ==
For his athletic ability as a student Tipton was named to the Duke University Athletic Hall of Fame in 1976 in the second induction year. He joined the William & Mary Athletic Hall of Fame in 1989 after serving as a coach from 1939–1957 and, at the time, was one of few non-William & Mary graduation coaches inducted. Tipton was named to the Army Sports Hall of Fame (at the United States Military Academy) in 2005 in the second induction year; he was the first two-sport head coach honored at West Point. Tipton was inducted into the Virginia Sports Hall of Fame in 1978.
